= 2013 UCI Europe Tour =

Road bicycle race series

- Ninth edition of the UCI Europe Tour

Details
- Dates: 27 January 2013 – 20 October 2013
- Location: Europe
- Races: About 300+

Champions
- Individual champion: Riccardo Zoidl (AUT) (Gourmetfein–Simplon)
- Teams' champion: Team Europcar
- Nations' champion: France

The 2013 UCI Europe Tour was the ninth season of the UCI Europe Tour. The 2013 season began on 27 January 2013 with the Grand Prix Cycliste la Marseillaise and ended on 20 October 2013 with the Chrono des Nations.

The points leader, based on the cumulative results of previous races, wears the UCI Europe Tour cycling jersey. John Degenkolb of Germany was the defending champion of the 2012 UCI Europe Tour. Riccardo Zoidl of Austria was crowned as the 2013 UCI Europe Tour.

Throughout the season, points are awarded to the top finishers of stages within stage races and the final general classification standings of each of the stages races and one-day events. The quality and complexity of a race also determines how many points are awarded to the top finishers, the higher the UCI rating of a race, the more points are awarded.

The UCI ratings from highest to lowest are as follows:

- Multi-day events: 2.HC, 2.1 and 2.2
- One-day events: 1.HC, 1.1 and 1.2

== Events ==
Date	Race name	Location	UCI Rating	Winner	Team	Ref
27 January	Grand Prix Cycliste la Marseillaise	France	1.1	Justin Jules (FRA)	La Pomme Marseille	
30 Jan–3 Feb	Étoile de Bessèges	France	2.1	Jonathan Hivert (FRA)	Sojasun	
3 February	Trofeo Palma	Spain	1.1	Kenny Dehaes (BEL)	Lotto–Belisol	
4 February	Trofeo Campos–Santanyí–Ses Salines	Spain	1.1	Leigh Howard (AUS)	Orica–GreenEDGE	
5 February	Trofeo Serra de Tramuntana	Spain	1.1	Alejandro Valverde (ESP)	Movistar Team	
6 February	Trofeo Platja de Muro	Spain	1.1	Leigh Howard (AUS)	Orica–GreenEDGE	
6–10 February	Tour Méditerranéen	France	2.1	Thomas Löfkvist (SWE)	IAM Cycling	
14–17 February	Volta ao Algarve	Portugal	2.1	Tony Martin (GER)	Omega Pharma–Quick-Step	
16 February	Trofeo Laigueglia	Italy	1.1	Filippo Pozzato (ITA)	Lampre–Merida	
16–17 February	Tour du Haut Var	France	2.1	Arthur Vichot (FRA)	FDJ	
17–20 February	Vuelta a Andalucía	Spain	2.1	Alejandro Valverde (ESP)	Movistar Team	
23 February	Vuelta a Murcia	Spain	1.1	Daniel Navarro (ESP)	Cofidis	
23 February	Beverbeek Classic	Belgium	1.2	Nick van der Lijke (NED)	Rabobank Development Team	
23 February	Omloop Het Nieuwsblad	Belgium	1.HC	Luca Paolini (ITA)	Team Katusha	
24 February	Les Boucles du Sud Ardèche	France	1.1	Mathieu Drujon (FRA)	BigMat–Auber 93	
24 February	Clásica de Almería	Spain	1.HC	Mark Renshaw (AUS)	Blanco Pro Cycling	
27 February	Le Samyn	Belgium	1.1	Alexey Tsatevich (RUS)	Team Katusha	
28 February	Gran Premio Città di Camaiore	Italy	1.1	Peter Sagan (SVK)	Cannondale	
1–3 March	Driedaagse van West-Vlaanderen	Belgium	2.1	Kristof Vandewalle (BEL)	Omega Pharma–Quick-Step	
2 March	Strade Bianche	Italy	1.1	Moreno Moser (ITA)	Cannondale	
2 March	Ster van Zwolle	Netherlands	1.2	Dylan van Baarle (NED)	Rabobank Development Team	
3 March	Roma Maxima	Italy	1.1	Blel Kadri (FRA)	Ag2r–La Mondiale	
3 March	Grand Prix de la Ville de Lillers	France	1.2	Benoît Daeninck (FRA)	CC Nogent-sur-Oise	
6 March	Trofej Umag	Croatia	1.2	Aljaž Hočevar (SLO)	Adria Mobil	
9 March	Ronde van Drenthe	Netherlands	1.1	Alexander Wetterhall (SWE)	NetApp–Endura	
10 March	Paris–Troyes	France	1.2	Jean-Marc Bideau (FRA)	Bretagne–Séché Environnement	
10 March	Kattekoers	Belgium	1.2	Jérôme Baugnies (BEL)	To Win–Josan	
10 March	Trofej Poreč	Croatia	1.2	Matej Mugerli (SLO)	Adria Mobil	
10 March	Dorpenomloop Rucphen	Netherlands	1.2	Dylan van Baarle (NED)	Rabobank Development Team	
10 March	Omloop van het Waasland	Belgium	1.2	Pieter Jacobs (BEL)	Topsport Vlaanderen–Baloise	
14 March	Gran Premio Nobili Rubinetterie	Italy	1.1	Bob Jungels (LUX)	RadioShack–Leopard	
14–17 March	Istrian Spring Trophy	Croatia	2.2	Matej Mugerli (SLO)	Adria Mobil	
15 March	Handzame Classic	Belgium	1.1	Kenny Dehaes (BEL)	Lotto–Belisol	
16 March	Classic Loire Atlantique	France	1.1	Edwig Cammaerts (BEL)	Cofidis	
17 March	Cholet-Pays de Loire	France	1.1	Damien Gaudin (FRA)	Team Europcar	
17 March	Grand Prix de la ville de Nogent-sur-Oise	France	1.2	Alexander Kamp (DEN)	Team Cult Energy	
17 March	Gran Premio San Giuseppe	Italy	1.2	Luca Chirico (ITA)	U.C. Trevigiani–Dynamon–Bottoli	
18–24 March	Tour de Normandie	France	2.2	Silvan Dillier (SUI)	BMC Development Team	
20 March	Dwars door Vlaanderen	Belgium	1.HC	Oscar Gatto (ITA)	Vini Fantini–Selle Italia	
20–24 March	Settimana Coppi & Bartali	Italy	2.1	Diego Ulissi (ITA)	Lampre–Merida	
20–24 March	Volta ao Alentejo	Portugal	2.2	Jasper Stuyven (BEL)	Bontrager Cycling Team	
23 March	Košice–Miskolc	Hungary	1.2	Michal Kolář (SVK)	Dukla Trenčín-Trek	
23–24 March	Critérium International	France	2.HC	Chris Froome (GBR)	Team Sky	
26–28 March	Three Days of De Panne	Belgium	2.HC	Sylvain Chavanel (FRA)	Omega Pharma–Quick-Step	
29 March	Route Adélie	France	1.1	Alessandro Malaguti (ITA)	Androni Giocattoli–Venezuela	
29–31 March	Le Triptyque des Monts et Châteaux	Belgium	2.2	Fábio Silvestre (POR)	Leopard–Trek Continental Team	
30 March	Volta Limburg Classic	Netherlands	1.1	Rüdiger Selig (GER)	Team Katusha	
30 March	GP Miguel Induráin	Spain	1.1	Simon Špilak (SLO)	Team Katusha	
30–31 March	Boucle de l'Artois	France	2.2	Fredrik Ludvigsson (SWE)	Team People4you–fvlUnaas Cycling	
31 March	Vuelta a La Rioja	Spain	1.1	Francesco Lasca (ITA)	Caja Rural–Seguros RGA	
31 March	Val d'Ille Classic	France	1.1	Nacer Bouhanni (FRA)	FDJ	
1 April	Giro del Belvedere	Italy	1.2U	Stefan Küng (SUI)	BMC Development Team	
2 April	Gran Premio Palio del Recioto	Italy	1.2U	Caleb Ewan (AUS)	Australia (national team)	
2–5 April	Circuit de la Sarthe	France	2.1	Pierre Rolland (FRA)	Team Europcar	
3 April	Scheldeprijs	Belgium	1.HC	Marcel Kittel (GER)	Argos–Shimano	
3–7 April	Grand Prix of Sochi	Russia	2.2	Vitaliy Buts (UKR)	Kolss Cycling Team	
4 April	Grand Prix Pino Cerami	Belgium	1.1	Jonas Vangenechten (BEL)	Lotto–Belisol	
5–7 April	Circuit des Ardennes	France	2.2	Riccardo Zoidl (AUT)	Gourmetfein–Simplon	
6 April	Ronde Van Vlaanderen Beloften	Belgium	1.Ncup	Rick Zabel (GER)	Germany (national team)	
7 April	Klasika Primavera	Spain	1.1	Rui Costa (POR)	Movistar Team	
7 April	GP Sencur	Slovenia	1.2	Radoslav Rogina (CRO)	Adria Mobil	
7 April	Trofeo Banca Popolare di Vicenza	Italy	1.2U	Michele Scartezzini (ITA)	U.C. Trevigiani–Dynamon–Bottoli	
9 April	Paris–Camembert	France	1.1	Pierrick Fédrigo (FRA)	FDJ	
10 April	Brabantse Pijl	Belgium	1.HC	Peter Sagan (SVK)	Cannondale	
10 April	Côte picarde	France	1.Ncup	Caleb Ewan (AUS)	Australia (national team)	
10–14 April	Tour du Loir-et-Cher	France	2.2	Tino Thömel (GER)	Team NSP–Ghost	
11 April	Grand Prix de Denain	France	1.1	Arnaud Démare (FRA)	FDJ	
12–14 April	Vuelta a Castilla y León	Spain	2.1	Rubén Plaza (ESP)	Movistar Team	
13 April	Tour du Finistère	France	1.1	Cyril Gautier (FRA)	Team Europcar	
13 April	Trofeo Edil C	Italy	1.2	Andrea Zordan (ITA)	Zalf–Euromobil–Désirée–Fior	
13 April	Liège–Bastogne–Liège Espoirs	Belgium	1.2U	Michael Valgren (DEN)	Team Cult Energy	
13 April	ZLM Tour	Netherlands	1.Ncup	Yoeri Havik (NED)	Netherlands (national team)	
14 April	Tro-Bro Léon	France	1.1	Francis Mourey (FRA)	FDJ	
14 April	GP of Donetsk	Ukraine	1.2	Anatoliy Pakhtusov (UKR)	ISD Continental Team	
16–19 April	Giro del Trentino	Italy	2.HC	Vincenzo Nibali (ITA)	Astana	
17–21 April	GP of Adygeya	Russia	2.2	Andriy Khripta (UKR)	Kolss Cycling Team	
20 April	Banja Luka–Belgrad I	Bosnia and Herzegovina	1.2	Michal Kolář (SVK)	Dukla Trenčín-Trek	
20 April	GP Herning	Denmark	1.2	Lasse Norman Hansen (DEN)	Blue Water Cycling	
20 April	Arno Wallaard Memorial	Netherlands	1.2	Coen Vermeltfoort (NED)	Cycling Team De Rijke–Shanks	
21 April	La Roue Tourangelle	France	1.1	Mickaël Delage (FRA)	FDJ	
21 April	Ronde van Noord-Holland	Netherlands	1.2	Dylan Groenewegen (NED)	Cycling Team De Rijke–Shanks	
21 April	Banja Luka–Belgrad II	Serbia	1.2	Matej Mugerli (SLO)	Adria Mobil	
21 April	Paris–Mantes-en-Yvelines	France	1.2	Nicolas Baldo (FRA)	Atlas Personal–Jakroo	
21 April	Rutland–Melton Classic	United Kingdom	1.2	Ian Wilkinson (GBR)	Team UK Youth	
21–28 April	Presidential Cycling Tour of Turkey	Turkey	2.HC	Natnael Berhane (ERI)	Team Europcar	
25 April	Gran Premio della Liberazione	Italy	1.2U	Ilia Koshevoy (BLR)	Big Hunter Seanese	
25 April–1 May	Tour de Bretagne	France	2.2	Riccardo Zoidl (AUT)	Gourmetfein–Simplon	
26 April	Skive–Løbet	Denmark	1.2	Patrick Clausen (DEN)	Team Cult Energy	
27 April	GP Industria & Artigianato di Larciano	Italy	1.1	Mauro Santambrogio (ITA)	Vini Fantini–Selle Italia	
27 April	Zuid Oost Drenthe Classic I	Netherlands	1.2	Jeff Vermeulen (NED)	Metec–TKH	
27 April	Himmerland Rundt	Denmark	1.2	Yoeri Havik (NED)	Cycling Team De Rijke–Shanks	
28 April	Giro della Toscana	Italy	1.1	Mattia Gavazzi (ITA)	Androni Giocattoli–Venezuela	
28 April	Zuid Oost Drenthe Classic II	Netherlands	1.2	Brian Van Goethem (NED)	Metec–TKH	
28 April	GP Industrie del Marmo	Italy	1.2	Luca Benedetti (ITA)	Bedogni-Natalini-Anico	
28 April	Destination Thy	Denmark	1.2	Constantino Zaballa (ESP)	Christina Watches–Onfone	
1 May	Mayor Cup	Russia	1.2	Vitaliy Buts (UKR)	Kolss Cycling Team	
1 May	Memoriał Andrzeja Trochanowskiego	Poland	1.2	Konrad Dąbkowski (POL)	BDC-Marcpol Team	
1 May	Grote 1-MeiPrijs	Belgium	1.2	Coen Vermeltfoort (NED)	Cycling Team De Rijke–Shanks	
1 May	Rund um den Finanzplatz U23	Germany	1.2U	Lasse Norman Hansen (DEN)	Blue Water Cycling	
1 May	Rund um den Finanzplatz	Germany	1.HC	Simon Špilak (SLO)	Team Katusha	
1–5 May	Tour d'Azerbaïdjan	Azerbaijan	2.2	Sergiy Grechyn (UKR)	Torku Şekerspor	
1–5 May	Coupe des Carpathes	Poland	2.2U	Stefan Poutsma (NED)	Cycling Team Jo Piels	
1–5 May	Four Days of Dunkirk	France	2.HC	Arnaud Démare (FRA)	FDJ	
2 May	Memorial Oleg Dyachenko	Russia	1.2	Alexander Rybakov (RUS)	RusVelo	
3 May	Grand Prix of Moscow	Russia	1.2	Ivan Kovalev (RUS)	RusVelo	
3–5 May	Szlakiem Grodów Piastowskich	Poland	2.1	Jan Bárta (CZE)	NetApp–Endura	
4 May	Vuelta a la Comunidad de Madrid	Spain	1.1	Javier Moreno (ESP)	Movistar Team	
4 May	Ronde van Overijssel	Netherlands	1.2	Tom Vermeer (NED)	Cycling Team Jo Piels	
4 May	Hadeland GP	Norway	1.2	Fredrik Galta (NOR)	Team Øster Hus-Ridley	
4 May	Tour de Berne	Switzerland	1.2	Marcel Wyss (SUI)	IAM Cycling	
5 May	Ringerike GP	Norway	1.2	Reidar Borgersen (NOR)	Joker–Merida	
5 May	Circuit de Wallonie	Belgium	1.2	Sébastien Delfosse (BEL)	Crelan–Euphony	
5 May	Circuito del Porto-Trofeo Arvedi	Italy	1.2	Paolo Simion (ITA)	Zalf–Euromobil–Désirée–Fior	
5–9 May	Five Rings of Moscow	Russia	2.2	Maksim Razumov (RUS)	Itera–Katusha	
8–12 May	Flèche du Sud	Luxembourg	2.2	Michael Valgren (DEN)	Team Cult Energy	
8–12 May	Giro del Friuli-Venezia Giulia	Italy	2.2	Jan Polanc (SLO)	Radenska	
9 May	Ronde van Limburg	Belgium	1.2	Olivier Chevalier (BEL)	Wallonie-Bruxelles	
9–12 May	Rhône-Alpes Isère Tour	France	2.2	Nico Sijmens (BEL)	Cofidis	
9–12 May	Tour de Berlin	Germany	2.2U	Mathias Møller (DEN)	Blue Water Cycling	
10–12 May	Tour de Picardie	France	2.1	Marcel Kittel (GER)	Argos–Shimano	
10–12 May	Vuelta a Asturias	Spain	2.1	Amets Txurruka (ESP)	Caja Rural–Seguros RGA	
11 May	Scandinavian Race	Sweden	1.2	Alexander Gingsjö (SWE)	Team People4you-Unaas Cycling	
11 May	Classic Beograd–Čačak	Serbia	1.2	Matej Mugerli (SLO)	Adria Mobil	
12 May	Rund um Köln	Germany	1.1	Sébastien Delfosse (BEL)	Crelan–Euphony	
13–18 May	Olympia's Tour	Netherlands	2.2	Dylan van Baarle (NED)	Rabobank Development Team	
15–19 May	Tour of Norway	Norway	2.1	Edvald Boasson Hagen (NOR)	Team Sky	
16–19 May	Ronde de l'Isard	France	2.2U	Juan Ernesto Chamorro (COL)	4-72 Colombia	
18 May	Grand Prix Criquielion	Belgium	1.2	Boris Vallée (BEL)	Color Code–Biowanze	
18–19 May	Paris–Arras Tour	France	2.2	Joey Rosskopf (USA)	Hincapie Sportswear Development Team	
19 May	Omloop der Kempen	Netherlands	1.2	Eugenio Alafaci (ITA)	Leopard–Trek Continental Team	
19–26 May	An Post Rás	Ireland	2.2	Marcin Białobłocki (POL)	Team UK Youth	
22–26 May	Tour of Belgium	Belgium	2.HC	Tony Martin (GER)	Omega Pharma–Quick-Step	
22–26 May	Bayern-Rundfahrt	Germany	2.HC	Adriano Malori (ITA)	Lampre–Merida	
23–26 May	Tour de Gironde	France	2.2	Jon Larrinaga (ESP)	Euskadi Continental Team	
24 May	Race Horizon Park 1	Ukraine	1.2	Denys Kostyuk (UKR)	Kolss Cycling Team	
24–26 May	Course de la Paix U23	Czech Republic	2.2U	Toms Skujiņš (LAT)	Latvia (national team)	
25 May	GP de Plumelec-Morbihan	France	1.1	Samuel Dumoulin (FRA)	Ag2r–La Mondiale	
26 May	Boucles de l'Aulne	France	1.1	Mathieu Ladagnous (FRA)	FDJ	
26 May	Race Horizon Park 2	Ukraine	1.2	Mykhaylo Kononenko (UKR)	Kolss Cycling Team	
26 May	Trofeo Città di San Vendemiano	Italy	1.2U	Mark Džamastagič (SLO)	Sava	
30 May–1 June	Tour of Estonia	Estonia	2.1	Gert Jõeäär (EST)	Estonia (national team)	
2 June	Ronde van Zeeland Seaports	Netherlands	1.1	André Greipel (GER)	Lotto–Belisol	
2 June	GP Südkärnten	Austria	1.2	Julian Alaphilippe (FRA)	Etixx–IHNed	
2 June	Memorial Van Coningsloo	Belgium	1.2	Michael Vink (NZL)	New Zealand (national team)	
2 June	Trofeo Alcide Degasperi	Italy	1.2	Damien Howson (AUS)	Australia (national team)	
2 June	Coppa della Pace	Italy	1.2	Alessio Taliani (ITA)	Futura Team Matricardi	
4–7 June	Tour de Slovaquie	Slovakia	2.2	Petr Vakoč (CZE)	Etixx–IHNed	
6 June	GP du canton d'Argovie	Switzerland	1.1	Michael Albasini (SUI)	Orica–GreenEDGE	
6–9 June	Ronde de l'Oise	France	2.2	Vegard Breen (NOR)	Joker–Merida	
8 June	Riga–Jūrmala GP	Latvia	1.1	Francesco Chicchi (ITA)	Vini Fantini–Selle Italia	
8–15 June	Thüringen Rundfahrt der U23	Germany	2.2U	Dylan van Baarle (NED)	Rabobank Development Team	
9 June	Jūrmala GP	Latvia	1.1	Francesco Chicchi (ITA)	Vini Fantini–Selle Italia	
9 June	ProRace Berlin	Germany	1.1	Marcel Kittel (GER)	Argos–Shimano	
9 June	GP Judendorf-Strassengel	Austria	1.2	Riccardo Zoidl (AUT)	Gourmetfein–Simplon	
11–16 June	Tour de Serbie	Serbia	2.2	Ivan Stević (SRB)	Tușnad Cycling Team	
12–16 June	Ster ZLM Toer	Netherlands	2.1	Lars Boom (NED)	Blanco Pro Cycling	
12–16 June	Tour de Luxembourg	Luxembourg	2.HC	Paul Martens (GER)	Blanco Pro Cycling	
13–15 June	Tour of Małopolska	Poland	2.2	Łukasz Bodnar (POL)	Bank BGŻ	
13–16 June	Route du Sud	France	2.1	Thomas Voeckler (FRA)	Team Europcar	
13–16 June	Tour of Slovenia	Slovenia	2.1	Radoslav Rogina (CRO)	Adria Mobil	
13–16 June	Boucles de la Mayenne	France	2.2	David Veilleux (CAN)	Team Europcar	
13–16 June	Tour des Pays de Savoie	France	2.2	Yoann Barbas (FRA)	Armée de Terre	
14–16 June	Oberösterreichrundfahrt	Austria	2.2	Riccardo Zoidl (AUT)	Gourmetfein–Simplon	
16 June	Flèche Ardennaise	Belgium	1.2	Silvan Dillier (SUI)	BMC Development Team	
19 June	Halle–Ingooigem	Belgium	1.1	Kenny Dehaes (BEL)	Lotto–Belisol	
22 June	Trofeo Melinda	Italy	1.1	Ivan Santaromita (ITA)	BMC Racing Team	
26 June	I.W.T. Jong Maar Moedig	Belgium	1.2	Tim Declercq (BEL)	Topsport Vlaanderen–Baloise	
26–29 June	Course de la Solidarité Olympique	Poland	2.1	Vitaliy Popkov (UKR)	ISD Continental Team	
29 June	Omloop Het Nieuwsblad U23	Belgium	1.2	Dimitri Claeys (BEL)	VL Technics–Abutriek	
30 June–6 July	Tour of Romania	Romania	2.2	Vitaliy Buts (UKR)	Kolss Cycling Team	
30 June–7 July	Österreich Rundfahrt	Austria	2.HC	Riccardo Zoidl (AUT)	Gourmetfein–Simplon	
5–7 July	Vuelta a la Comunidad de Madrid Sub 23	Spain	2.2U	Petr Vakoč (CZE)	Etixx–IHNed	
7 July	Giro del Medio Brenta	Italy	1.2	Federico Rocchetti (ITA)	Utensilnord Ora24.eu	
7 July	La Ronde Pévèloise	France	1.2	Benoît Daeninck (FRA)	CC Nogent-sur-Oise	
9–14 July	Giro della Valle d'Aosta	Italy	2.2U	Davide Villella (ITA)	Team Colpack	
11 July	GP Stad Geel	Belgium	1.2	Yves Lampaert (BEL)	Topsport Vlaanderen–Baloise	
11–14 July	Cycling Tour of Sibiu	Romania	2.1	Davide Rebellin (ITA)	CCC–Polsat–Polkowice	
11–14 July	Czech Cycling Tour	Czech Republic	2.2	Leopold König (CZE)	Czech Republic (national team)	
14 July	Giro dell'Appennino	Italy	1.1	Davide Mucelli (ITA)	Ceramica Flaminia–Fondriest	
18 July	European Road Championships – Time Trial	Czech Republic	CC	Victor Campenaerts (BEL)	Belgium (national team)	
19–21 July	Troféu Joaquim Agostinho	Portugal	2.2	Eduard Prades (ESP)	OFM–Quinta da Lixa	
20 July	Miskolc GP	Hungary	1.2	Siarhei Papok (BLR)	Belarus (national team)	
20–24 July	Tour de Wallonie	Belgium	2.HC	Greg Van Avermaet (BEL)	BMC Racing Team	
21 July	Budapest GP	Hungary	1.2	Krisztián Lovassy (HUN)	Utensilnord Ora24.eu	
21 July	European Road Championships – Road race	Czech Republic	CC	Sean De Bie (BEL)	Belgium (national team)	
23–27 July	Dookoła Mazowsza	Poland	2.2	Marcin Sapa (POL)	BDC-Marcpol Team	
23–28 July	Tour Alsace	France	2.2	Silvio Herklotz (GER)	Team Stölting	
25 July	Prueba Villafranca de Ordizia	Spain	1.1	Daniel Teklehaymanot (ERI)	Orica–GreenEDGE	
27–29 July	Kreiz Breizh Elites	France	2.2	Nick van der Lijke (NED)	Rabobank Development Team	
27 July	GP Kranj	Slovenia	1.2	Lukas Pöstlberger (AUT)	Gourmetfein–Simplon	
28 July	Trofeo Matteotti	Italy	1.1	Sébastien Reichenbach (SUI)	IAM Cycling	
28 July	Polynormande	France	1.1	José Gonçalves (POR)	La Pomme Marseille	
28 July	GP Ville de Pérenchies	France	1.2	Melvin Rullière (FRA)	SCO Dijon–Team Matériel-Velo.com	
31 July	Circuito de Getxo	Spain	1.1	Juan José Lobato (ESP)	Euskaltel–Euskadi	
31 July–4 August	Danmark Rundt	Denmark	2.HC	Wilco Kelderman (NED)	Belkin Pro Cycling	
2–4 August	Vuelta a León	Spain	2.2	Jordi Simón (ESP)	Coluer Bikes	
2–11 August	Tour de Guadeloupe	France	2.2	Pierre Lebreton (FRA)	Team Peltrax CSD	
4 August	RideLondon–Surrey Classic	United Kingdom	1.1	Arnaud Démare (FRA)	FDJ.fr	
4 August	Trofeo Bastianelli	Italy	1.2	Maxat Ayazbayev (KAZ)	Continental Team Astana	
4 August	Antwerpse Havenpijl	Belgium	1.2	Preben Van Hecke (BEL)	Topsport Vlaanderen–Baloise	
7–11 August	Vuelta a Burgos	Spain	2.HC	Nairo Quintana (COL)	Movistar Team	
7–18 August	Volta a Portugal	Portugal	2.1	Alejandro Marque (ESP)	OFM–Quinta da Lixa	
8–10 August	Tour of Szeklerland	Romania	2.2	Georgi Georgiev (BUL)	Brisaspor	
8–11 August	Arctic Race of Norway	Norway	2.1	Thor Hushovd (NOR)	BMC Racing Team	
9–13 August	Tour de l'Ain	France	2.1	Romain Bardet (FRA)	Ag2r–La Mondiale	
10 August	Memoriał Henryka Łasaka	Poland	1.2	Florian Sénéchal (FRA)	Etixx–IHNed	
11 August	Puchar Uzdrowisk Karpackich	Poland	1.2	Adrian Honkisz (POL)	CCC–Polsat–Polkowice	
11 August	GP di Poggiana	Italy	1.2U	Andrea Zordan (ITA)	Zalf–Euromobil–Désirée–Fior	
16 August	GP Capodarco	Italy	1.2	Matteo Busato (ITA)	U.C. Trevigiani–Dynamon–Bottoli	
16–18 August	Tour de Fjords	Norway	2.1	Sergey Chernetskiy (RUS)	Team Katusha	
17 August	GP Královehradeckého Kraje	Czech Republic	1.2	Petr Vakoč (CZE)	Etixx–IHNed	
17 August	Puchar Ministra Obrony Narodowej	Poland	1.2	Bartłomiej Matysiak (POL)	CCC–Polsat–Polkowice	
19–25 August	Baltic Chain Tour	Finland; Estonia; Latvia; Lithuania	2.2	Philipp Walsleben (GER)	BKCP–Powerplus	
20 August	Grote Prijs Stad Zottegem	Belgium	1.1	Blaž Jarc (SLO)	NetApp–Endura	
20 August	GP des Marbriers	France	1.2	Benoît Daeninck (FRA)	CC Nogent-sur-Oise	
20–23 August	Tour du Limousin	France	2.1	Martin Elmiger (SUI)	IAM Cycling	
21 August	Druivenkoers Overijse	Belgium	1.1	Björn Leukemans (BEL)	Vacansoleil–DCM	
21 August	Coppa Ugo Agostoni	Italy	1.1	Filippo Pozzato (ITA)	Lampre–Merida	
22 August	Coppa Bernocchi	Italy	1.1	Sacha Modolo (ITA)	Bardiani Valvole–CSF Inox	
23 August	Tre Valli Varesine	Italy	1.HC	Kristijan Đurasek (CRO)	Lampre–Merida	
23 August	Dutch Food Valley Classic	Netherlands	1.1	Elia Viviani (ITA)	Cannondale	
24–31 August	Tour de l'Avenir	France	2.Ncup	Rubén Fernández (ESP)	Spain (national team)	
25 August	Châteauroux Classic	France	1.1	Bryan Coquard (FRA)	Team Europcar	
27–30 August	Tour du Poitou-Charentes	France	2.1	Thomas Voeckler (FRA)	Team Europcar	
30–31 August	World Ports Classic	Belgium; Netherlands	2.1	Nikolas Maes (BEL)	Omega Pharma–Quick-Step	
31 August	Memorial Marco Pantani	Italy	1.1	Sacha Modolo (ITA)	Bardiani Valvole–CSF Inox	
1 September	Schaal Sels-Merksem	Belgium	1.1	Pieter Jacobs (BEL)	Topsport Vlaanderen–Baloise	
1 September	Ronde van Midden-Nederland	Netherlands	1.2	Sebastian Forke (GER)	Team NSP–Ghost	
1 September	Croatia–Slovenia	Slovenia	1.2	Riccardo Zoidl (AUT)	Gourmetfein–Simplon	
1–5 September	Tour of Bulgaria	Bulgaria	2.2	Rémy Di Gregorio (FRA)	Team Martigues SC-Vivelo	
5–7 September	Settimana Ciclistica Lombarda	Italy	2.1	Patrik Sinkewitz (GER)	Meridiana–Kamen	
5–8 September	Okolo Jižních Čech	Czech Republic	2.2	Florian Sénéchal (FRA)	Etixx–IHNed	
7 September	Brussels Cycling Classic	Belgium	1.HC	André Greipel (GER)	Lotto–Belisol	
8 September	Kernen Omloop Echt-Susteren	Netherlands	1.2	Dylan Groenewegen (NED)	Cycling Team De Rijke–Shanks	
8 September	GP de Fourmies	France	1.HC	Nacer Bouhanni (FRA)	FDJ.fr	
14 September	Tour du Jura	Switzerland	1.2	Matthias Brändle (AUT)	IAM Cycling	
14 September	Kustpijl Knokke-Heist	Belgium	1.2	Egidijus Juodvalkis (LTU)	Crelan–Euphony	
15 September	Tour du Doubs	France	1.1	Aleksejs Saramotins (LAT)	IAM Cycling	
15 September	GP Jef Scherens	Belgium	1.1	Bert De Backer (BEL)	Argos–Shimano	
15 September	Baronie Breda Classic	Netherlands	1.2	Mike Teunissen (NED)	Rabobank Development Team	
15 September	Chrono Champenois	France	1.2	Campbell Flakemore (AUS)	Australia (national team)	
15–22 September	Tour of Britain	United Kingdom	2.1	Bradley Wiggins (GBR)	Team Sky	
18 September	GP de Wallonie	Belgium	1.1	Jan Bakelants (BEL)	Belgium (national team)	
20 September	Kampioenschap van Vlaanderen	Belgium	1.1	Jens Debusschere (BEL)	Lotto–Belisol	
20 September	GP de la Somme	France	1.1	Preben Van Hecke (BEL)	Topsport Vlaanderen–Baloise	
21 September	GP Impanis-Van Petegem	Belgium	1.1	Sep Vanmarcke (BEL)	Belkin Pro Cycling	
21 September	GP Costa degli Etruschi	Italy	1.1	Michele Scarponi (ITA)	Lampre–Merida	
21 September	Tour Bohemia	Czech Republic	1.2	Josef Benetseder (AUT)	WSA Viperbike	
22 September	GP d'Isbergues	France	1.1	Arnaud Démare (FRA)	FDJ.fr	
22 September	GP Industria & Commercio di Prato	Italy	1.1	Gianfranco Zilioli (ITA)	Androni Giocattoli–Venezuela	
24 September	Ruota d'Oro	Italy	1.2	Andrea Toniatti (ITA)	Zalf–Euromobil–Désirée–Fior	
25 September	Omloop van het Houtland	Belgium	1.1	Marcel Kittel (GER)	Argos–Shimano	
28–29 September	Tour du Gévaudan	France	2.2	Yoann Bagot (FRA)	Cofidis	
29 September	Duo Normand	France	1.1	Luke Durbridge (AUS); Svein Tuft (CAN)	Orica–GreenEDGE	
29 September	Gooikse Pijl	Belgium	1.2	Vegard Bugge (NOR)	Joker–Merida	
2 October	Milano–Torino	Italy	1.HC	Diego Ulissi (ITA)	Lampre–Merida	
3 October	Sparkassen Münsterland Giro	Germany	1.1	Jos van Emden (NED)	Belkin Pro Cycling	
3–6 October	Tour de l'Eurometropole	Belgium	2.1	Jens Debusschere (BEL)	Lotto–Belisol	
5 October	Piccolo Giro di Lombardia	Italy	1.2	Davide Villella (ITA)	Team Colpack	
6 October	Tour de Vendée	France	1.HC	Nacer Bouhanni (FRA)	FDJ.fr	
8 October	Binche–Tournai–Binche	Belgium	1.1	Reinardt Janse van Rensburg (RSA)	Argos–Shimano	
10 October	Paris–Bourges	France	1.1	John Degenkolb (GER)	Argos–Shimano	
10 October	Coppa Sabatini	Italy	1.1	Diego Ulissi (ITA)	Lampre–Merida	
12 October	Giro dell'Emilia	Italy	1.HC	Diego Ulissi (ITA)	Lampre–Merida	
13 October	GP Bruno Beghelli	Italy	1.1	Leonardo Duque (COL)	Colombia	
13 October	Paris–Tours Espoirs	France	1.2U	Flavien Dassonville (FRA)	Comité d'Ile de France	
13 October	Paris–Tours	France	1.HC	John Degenkolb (GER)	Argos–Shimano	
15 October	Nationale Sluitingsprijs	Belgium	1.1	Jens Debusschere (BEL)	Lotto–Belisol	
20 October	Chrono des Nations	France	1.1	Tony Martin (GER)	Omega Pharma–Quick-Step	

== Final standings ==
There was a competition for the rider, team and country with the most points gained from winning or achieving a high place in the above races.

=== Individual classification ===
Rank	Name	Team	Points
1	Riccardo Zoidl (AUT)	Gourmetfein–Simplon	531.5
2	Bryan Coquard (FRA)	Team Europcar	484
3	Davide Rebellin (ITA)	CCC–Polsat–Polkowice	430
4	Matej Mugerli (SLO)	Adria Mobil	387
5	Thomas Voeckler (FRA)	Team Europcar	369
6	Michael Van Staeyen (BEL)	Topsport Vlaanderen–Baloise	367
7	Radoslav Rogina (CRO)	Adria Mobil	354
8	Jonathan Hivert (FRA)	Sojasun	334
9	Vitaliy Buts (UKR)	Kolss Cycling Team	320.67
10	Gerald Ciolek (GER)	MTN–Qhubeka	315

=== Team classification ===
Rank	Team	Points
1	Team Europcar	1502.6
2	IAM Cycling	1334.34
3	Topsport Vlaanderen–Baloise	1168.5
4	Androni Giocattoli–Venezuela	1149.2
5	Gourmetfein–Simplon	1028
6	Adria Mobil	1000
7	Vini Fantini–Selle Italia	927.4
8	CCC–Polsat–Polkowice	907.34
9	Sojasun	891.5
10	Rabobank Development Team	877

=== Nation classification ===
Rank	Nation	Points
1	France	2753.25
2	Italy	2742.2
3	Belgium	1772.17
4	Germany	1570
5	Spain	1494
6	Netherlands	1441.25
7	Czech Republic	1433.22
8	Ukraine	1365.69
9	Slovenia	1276
10	Austria	1227

=== Nation under-23 classification ===
Rank	Nation	Points
1	Netherlands	1264
2	France	1253.5
3	Italy	866
4	Denmark	757.5
5	Belgium	734.92
6	Germany	646
7	Slovenia	600
8	Czech Republic	455.92
9	Norway	373.75
10	Spain	251
