= 2014 UCI Europe Tour =

Road bicycle race series

- Tenth edition of the UCI Europe Tour

Details
- Dates: 2 February 2014 – 19 October 2014
- Location: Europe
- Races: About 300+

Champions
- Individual champion: Tom Van Asbroeck (BEL) (Topsport Vlaanderen–Baloise)
- Teams' champion: Topsport Vlaanderen–Baloise
- Nations' champion: Italy

The 2014 UCI Europe Tour was the tenth season of the UCI Europe Tour. The 2014 season began on 2 February 2014 with the Grand Prix Cycliste la Marseillaise and ended on 19 October 2014 with the Chrono des Nations.

The points leader, based on the cumulative results of previous races, wears the UCI Europe Tour cycling jersey. Riccardo Zoidl of Austria was the defending champion of the 2013 UCI Europe Tour. The 2014 Europe Tour was won by Tom Van Asbroeck.

Throughout the season, points are awarded to the top finishers of stages within stage races and the final general classification standings of each of the stages races and one-day events. The quality and complexity of a race also determines how many points are awarded to the top finishers, the higher the UCI rating of a race, the more points are awarded.

The UCI ratings from highest to lowest are as follows:

- Multi-day events: 2.HC, 2.1 and 2.2
- One-day events: 1.HC, 1.1 and 1.2

== Events ==
=== February ===
Date	Race name	Location	UCI Rating	Winner	Team	Ref
2 February	Grand Prix Cycliste la Marseillaise	France	1.1	Kenneth Vanbilsen (BEL)	Topsport Vlaanderen–Baloise	
2 February	GP Costa degli Etruschi	Italy	1.1	Simone Ponzi (ITA)	Yellow Fluo	
5–9 February	Étoile de Bessèges	France	2.1	Tobias Ludvigsson (SWE)	Giant–Shimano	
9 February	Trofeo Palma	Spain	1.1	Sacha Modolo (ITA)	Lampre–Merida	
10 February	Trofeo Ses Salines	Spain	1.1	Sacha Modolo (ITA)	Lampre–Merida	
11 February	Trofeo Serra de Tramuntana	Spain	1.1	Michał Kwiatkowski (POL)	Omega Pharma–Quick-Step	
12 February	Trofeo Muro-Port d'Alcúdia	Spain	1.1	Gianni Meersman (BEL)	Omega Pharma–Quick-Step	
13–16 February	Tour Méditerranéen	France	2.1	Steve Cummings (GBR)	BMC Racing Team	
19–23 February	Vuelta a Andalucía	Spain	2.1	Alejandro Valverde (ESP)	Movistar Team	
19–23 February	Volta ao Algarve	Portugal	2.1	Michał Kwiatkowski (POL)	Omega Pharma–Quick-Step	
21 February	Trofeo Laigueglia	Italy	1.1	José Serpa (COL)	Lampre–Merida	
22–23 February	Tour du Haut Var	France	2.1	Carlos Betancur (COL)	Ag2r–La Mondiale	
23 February	GP Izola	Slovenia	1.2	Cristian Delle Stelle (ITA)	Team Idea	

=== March ===
Date	Race name	Location	UCI Rating	Winner	Team	Ref
1 March	Omloop Het Nieuwsblad	Belgium	1.HC	Ian Stannard (GBR)	Team Sky	
1 March	Vuelta a Murcia	Spain	1.1	Alejandro Valverde (ESP)	Movistar Team	
1 March	Classic Sud-Ardèche	France	1.1	Florian Vachon (FRA)	Bretagne–Séché Environnement	
2 March	Clásica de Almería	Spain	1.HC	Sam Bennett (IRL)	NetApp–Endura	
2 March	Kuurne–Brussels–Kuurne	Belgium	1.1	Tom Boonen (BEL)	Omega Pharma–Quick-Step	
2 March	Gran Premio di Lugano	Switzerland	1.1	Mauro Finetto (ITA)	Yellow Fluo	
2 March	La Drôme Classic	France	1.1	Romain Bardet (FRA)	Ag2r–La Mondiale	
5 March	Le Samyn	Belgium	1.1	Maxime Vantomme (BEL)	Roubaix–Lille Métropole	
5 March	Trofej Umag	Croatia	1.2	Matej Mugerli (SLO)	Adria Mobil	
6 March	Gran Premio Città di Camaiore	Italy	1.1	Diego Ulissi (ITA)	Lampre–Merida	
7–9 March	Driedaagse van West-Vlaanderen	Belgium	2.1	Gert Jõeäär (EST)	Cofidis	
8 March	Strade Bianche	Italy	1.1	Michał Kwiatkowski (POL)	Omega Pharma–Quick-Step	
8 March	Ster van Zwolle	Netherlands	1.2	Bert-Jan Lindeman (NED)	Rabobank Development Team	
9 March	Roma Maxima	Italy	1.1	Alejandro Valverde (ESP)	Movistar Team	
9 March	Grand Prix de la Ville de Lillers	France	1.2	Steven Tronet (FRA)	BigMat–Auber 93	
9 March	Trofej Poreč	Croatia	1.2	Maksym Averin (UKR)	Synergy Baku	
9 March	Dorpenomloop Rucphen	Netherlands	1.2	Michael Carbel (DEN)	Cult Energy–Vital Water	
13–16 March	Istrian Spring Trophy	Croatia	2.2	Magnus Cort (DEN)	Cult Energy–Vital Water	
15 March	Ronde van Drenthe	Netherlands	1.1	Kenny Dehaes (BEL)	Lotto–Belisol	
16 March	Dwars door Drenthe	Netherlands	1.1	Simone Ponzi (ITA)	Neri Sottoli	
16 March	Omloop van het Waasland	Belgium	1.2	Danilo Napolitano (ITA)	Wanty–Groupe Gobert	
16 March	Kattekoers	Belgium	1.2	Łukasz Wiśniowski (POL)	Etixx	
16 March	Paris–Troyes	France	1.2	Steven Tronet (FRA)	BigMat–Auber 93	
19 March	Nokere Koerse	Belgium	1.1	Kenny Dehaes (BEL)	Lotto–Belisol	
20 March	Gran Premio Nobili Rubinetterie	Italy	1.1	Simone Ponzi (ITA)	Neri Sottoli	
21 March	Handzame Classic	Belgium	1.1	Luka Mezgec (SLO)	Giant–Shimano	
22 March	Classic Loire Atlantique	France	1.1	Alexis Gougeard (FRA)	Ag2r–La Mondiale	
23 March	Cholet-Pays de Loire	France	1.1	Tom Van Asbroeck (BEL)	Topsport Vlaanderen–Baloise	
24–30 March	Tour de Normandie	France	2.2	Stefan Küng (SUI)	BMC Development Team	
26 March	Dwars door Vlaanderen	Belgium	1.HC	Niki Terpstra (NED)	Omega Pharma–Quick-Step	
26–30 March	Volta ao Alentejo	Portugal	2.2	Carlos Barbero (ESP)	Euskadi	
27–30 March	Settimana Coppi & Bartali	Italy	2.1	Peter Kennaugh (GBR)	Team Sky	
29–30 March	Critérium International	France	2.HC	Jean-Christophe Péraud (FRA)	Ag2r–La Mondiale	

=== April ===
Date	Race name	Location	UCI Rating	Winner	Team	Ref
1–3 April	Three Days of De Panne	Belgium	2.HC	Guillaume Van Keirsbulck (BEL)	Omega Pharma–Quick-Step	
1–6 April	Grand Prix of Sochi	Russia	2.2	Ilnur Zakarin (RUS)	RusVelo	
4 April	Route Adélie	France	1.1	Bryan Coquard (FRA)	Team Europcar	
4–6 April	Triptyque des Monts et Châteaux	Belgium	2.2	Owain Doull (GBR)	Great Britain (national team)	
5 April	Volta Limburg Classic	Netherlands	1.1	Moreno Hofland (NED)	Belkin Pro Cycling	
5 April	GP Miguel Induráin	Spain	1.1	Alejandro Valverde (ESP)	Movistar Team	
6 April	Vuelta a La Rioja	Spain	1.1	Michael Matthews (AUS)	Orica–GreenEDGE	
6 April	Trofeo Banca Popolare di Vicenza	Italy	1.2U	Gregor Mühlberger (AUT)	Tirol Cycling Team	
8–11 April	Circuit de la Sarthe	France	2.1	Ramūnas Navardauskas (LTU)	Garmin–Sharp	
9 April	Scheldeprijs	Belgium	1.HC	Marcel Kittel (GER)	Giant–Shimano	
11–13 April	Circuit des Ardennes	France	2.2	Łukasz Wiśniowski (POL)	Etixx	
12 April	Grand Prix Pino Cerami	Belgium	1.1	Alessandro Petacchi (ITA)	Omega Pharma–Quick-Step	
12 April	Ronde Van Vlaanderen Beloften	Belgium	1.Ncup	Dylan Groenewegen (NED)	Netherlands (national team)	
12 April	Banja Luka–Beograd I	Bosnia and Herzegovina	1.2	Martin Otoničar (SLO)	Radenska	
12 April	Trofeo Edil C	Italy	1.2	Andrea Vaccher (ITA)	Marchiol–Emisfero	
13 April	Klasika Primavera	Spain	1.1	Pello Bilbao (ESP)	Caja Rural–Seguros RGA	
13 April	Banja Luka–Beograd II	Serbia	1.2	Ivan Stević (SRB)	Tuşnad Cycling Team	
15 April	Paris–Camembert	France	1.1	Bryan Coquard (FRA)	Team Europcar	
16 April	Brabantse Pijl	Belgium	1.HC	Philippe Gilbert (BEL)	BMC Racing Team	
16 April	La Côte Picarde	France	1.Ncup	Jens Wallays (BEL)	Belgium (national team)	
16–20 April	Tour du Loir-et-Cher	France	2.2	Graham Briggs (GBR)	Rapha Condor–JLT	
16–20 April	GP of Adygeya	Russia	2.2	Ilnur Zakarin (RUS)	RusVelo	
17 April	Grand Prix de Denain	France	1.1	Nacer Bouhanni (FRA)	FDJ.fr	
19 April	Tour du Finistère	France	1.1	Antoine Demoitié (BEL)	Wallonie-Bruxelles	
19 April	Arno Wallaard Memorial	Netherlands	1.2	Edvin Wilson (SWE)	Team Joker	
19 April	ZLM Tour	Netherlands	1.Ncup	Thomas Boudat (FRA)	France (national team)	
19 April	Liège–Bastogne–Liège Espoirs	Belgium	1.2U	Anthony Turgis (FRA)	CC Nogent-sur-Oise	
20 April	Tro-Bro Léon	France	1.1	Adrien Petit (FRA)	Cofidis	
21 April	Rund um Köln	Germany	1.1	Sam Bennett (IRL)	NetApp–Endura	
21 April	Giro del Belvedere	Italy	1.2U	Simone Andreetta (ITA)	Zalf Euromobil Désirée Fior	
22 April	Gran Premio Palio del Recioto	Italy	1.2U	Silvio Herklotz (GER)	Team Stölting	
22–25 April	Giro del Trentino	Italy	2.HC	Cadel Evans (AUS)	BMC Racing Team	
25 April	Gran Premio della Liberazione	Italy	1.2U	Evgeny Shalunov (RUS)	Lokosphinx	
25 April–1 May	Tour de Bretagne	France	2.2	Bert-Jan Lindeman (NED)	Rabobank Development Team	
26 April	Zuid Oost Drenthe Classic I	Netherlands	1.2	Wim Stroetinga (NED)	KOGA Cycling Team	
27 April	La Roue Tourangelle	France	1.1	Angelo Tulik (FRA)	Team Europcar	
27 April	Rutland–Melton Classic	United Kingdom	1.2	Tom Moses (GBR)	Rapha Condor–JLT	
27 April	Paris–Mantes-en-Yvelines	France	1.2	David Menut (FRA)	Armée de Terre	
27 April	Gran Premio Industrie del Marmo	Italy	1.2	Matej Mugerli (SLO)	Adria Mobil	
27 Apr–4 May	Presidential Cycling Tour of Turkey	Turkey	2.HC	Adam Yates (GBR)	Orica–GreenEDGE	
29 Apr–4 May	Carpathian Couriers Race	Poland	2.2U	Gregor Mühlberger (AUT)	Tirol Cycling Team	

=== May ===
Date	Race name	Location	UCI Rating	Winner	Team	Ref
1 May	Rund um den Finanzplatz U23	Germany	1.2U	Mads Pedersen (DEN)	Cult Energy–Vital Water	
1 May	Mayor Cup	Russia	1.2	Sergey Lagutin (RUS)	RusVelo	
1 May	Memoriał Andrzeja Trochanowskiego	Poland	1.2	Kamil Gradek (POL)	BDC Marcpol	
1 May	Rund um den Finanzplatz	Germany	1.HC	Alexander Kristoff (NOR)	Team Katusha	
2 May	Memorial Oleg Dyachenko	Russia	1.2	Andrey Solomennikov (RUS)	RusVelo	
2 May	Skive–Løbet	Denmark	1.2	Phil Bauhaus (GER)	Team Stölting	
3 May	Himmerland Rundt	Denmark	1.2	Magnus Cort (DEN)	Cult Energy–Vital Water	
3 May	Grand Prix of Moscow	Russia	1.2	Leonid Krasnov (RUS)	RusVelo	
3 May	Ronde van Overijssel	Netherlands	1.2	Dennis Coenen (BEL)	Leopard Development Team	
4 May	Grand Prix de la Somme	France	1.1	Yauheni Hutarovich (BLR)	Ag2r–La Mondiale	
4 May	Circuito del Porto	Italy	1.2	Jakub Mareczko (POL)	Viris-Maserati	
4 May	Destination Thy	Denmark	1.2	Magnus Cort (DEN)	Cult Energy–Vital Water	
5–9 May	Five Rings of Moscow	Russia	2.2	Andrey Solomennikov (RUS)	RusVelo	
7–11 May	Four Days of Dunkirk	France	2.HC	Arnaud Démare (FRA)	FDJ.fr	
7–11 May	Tour d'Azerbaïdjan	Azerbaijan	2.1	Ilnur Zakarin (RUS)	RusVelo	
9–11 May	Szlakiem Grodów Piastowskich	Poland	2.1	Mateusz Taciak (POL)	CCC–Polsat–Polkowice	
10 May	Tour de Berne	Switzerland	1.2	Matthias Brändle (AUT)	IAM Cycling	
10 May	Hadeland GP	Norway	1.2	Rasmus Guldhammer (DEN)	Team TreFor–Blue Water	
10 May	Scandinavian Race	Sweden	1.2	Jonas Aaen Jørgensen (DEN)	Riwal Cycling Team	
11 May	Ringerike GP	Norway	1.2	Magnus Cort (DEN)	Cult Energy–Vital Water	
11 May	Circuit de Wallonie	Belgium	1.2	Maurits Lammertink (NED)	Cycling Team Jo Piels	
12–17 May	Olympia's Tour	Netherlands	2.2	Berden de Vries (NED)	Cycling Team Jo Piels	
13 May	GP Polski Via Odra	Poland	1.2	Erik Baška (SVK)	Dukla Trenčín–Trek	
15–18 May	Rhône-Alpes Isère Tour	France	2.2	Matija Kvasina (CRO)	Gourmetfein–Simplon Wels	
15 May	GP Czech Republic	Czech Republic	1.2	Josef Černý (CZE)	CCC–Polsat–Polkowice	
16–18 May	Tour de Picardie	France	2.1	Arnaud Démare (FRA)	FDJ.fr	
16–18 May	Vuelta a Castilla y León	Spain	2.1	David Belda (ESP)	Burgos BH	
16 May	GP Slovakia	Slovakia	1.2	Paweł Bernas (POL)	BDC Marcpol	
17 May	Grand Prix Criquielion	Belgium	1.2	Kevin Peeters (BEL)	Vastgoedservice–Golden Palace	
17 May	GP Hungary	Hungary	1.2	Paweł Bernas (POL)	BDC Marcpol	
18 May	ProRace Berlin	Germany	1.1	Raymond Kreder (NED)	Garmin–Sharp	
18–25 May	An Post Rás	Ireland	2.2	Clemens Fankhauser (AUT)	Tirol Cycling Team	
21–25 May	Tour of Norway	Norway	2.HC	Maciej Paterski (POL)	CCC–Polsat–Polkowice	
22–25 May	Ronde de l'Isard	France	2.2U	Louis Vervaeke (BEL)	Lotto–Belisol U23	
23–25 May	Paris–Arras Tour	France	2.2	Maxime Vantomme (BEL)	Roubaix–Lille Métropole	
24–25 May	World Ports Classic	Belgium; Netherlands	2.1	Theo Bos (NED)	Belkin Pro Cycling	
25 May	Omloop der Kempen	Netherlands	1.2	Luke Davison (AUS)	Australia (national team)	
28 May–1 Jun	Tour of Belgium	Belgium	2.HC	Tony Martin (GER)	Omega Pharma–Quick-Step	
28 May–1 Jun	Bayern-Rundfahrt	Germany	2.HC	Geraint Thomas (GBR)	Team Sky	
28 May–1 Jun	Tour des Fjords	Norway	2.1	Alexander Kristoff (NOR)	Team Katusha	
28 May–1 Jun	Tour de Berlin	Germany	2.2U	Jochem Hoekstra (NED)	Cycling Team Jo Piels	
28 May–1 Jun	Flèche du Sud	Luxembourg	2.2	Gaëtan Bille (BEL)	Verandas Willems	
29–31 May	Tour of Estonia	Estonia	2.1	Eduard-Michael Grosu (ROM)	Vini Fantini–Nippo	
29 May–1 Jun	Tour de Gironde	France	2.2	Remco te Brake (NED)	Metec–TKH	
30 May	Race Horizon Park 1	Ukraine	1.2	Vitaliy Buts (UKR)	Kolss Cycling Team	
30 May–1 Jun	Course de la Paix U-23	Czech Republic	2.2U	Samuel Spokes (AUS)	Etixx	
31 May	GP de Plumelec-Morbihan	France	1.1	Julien Simon (FRA)	Cofidis	
31 May	Race Horizon Park 2	Ukraine	1.2	Mykhaylo Kononenko (UKR)	Kolss Cycling Team	

=== June ===
Date	Race name	Location	UCI Rating	Winner	Team	Ref
1 June	Boucles de l'Aulne	France	1.1	Alexis Gougeard (FRA)	Ag2r–La Mondiale	
1 June	GP Südkärnten	Austria	1.2	Andrea Pasqualon (ITA)	Area Zero Pro Team	
1 June	Race Horizon Park 3	Ukraine	1.2	Denys Kostyuk (UKR)	Kolss Cycling Team	
1 June	Paris–Roubaix Espoirs	France	1.2U	Mike Teunissen (NED)	Rabobank Development Team	
1 June	Trofeo Città di San Vendemiano	Italy	1.2U	Giacomo Berlato (ITA)	Zalf Euromobil Désirée Fior	
2 June	Trofeo Alcide Degasperi	Italy	1.2	Michele Gazzara (ITA)	Fausto Coppi Gazzera Videa	
3–7 June	de Slovaquie	Slovakia	2.2	Oleksandr Polivoda (UKR)	Kolss Cycling Team	
4–8 June	Tour de Luxembourg	Luxembourg	2.HC	Matti Breschel (DEN)	Tinkoff–Saxo	
5–8 June	Boucles de la Mayenne	France	2.1	Stéphane Rossetto (FRA)	BigMat–Auber 93	
7 June	Ronde van Zeeland Seaports	Netherlands	1.1	Theo Bos (NED)	Belkin Pro Cycling	
8 June	Memorial Van Coningsloo	Belgium	1.2	Rob Ruijgh (NED)	Vastgoedservice–Golden Palace	
8 June	Coppa della Pace	Italy	1.2	Luca Ceolan (ITA)	General Store Bottoli Zardini	
11–15 June	GP Udmurtskaya Pravda	Russia	2.2	Artur Ershov (RUS)	RusVelo	
12 June	GP du canton d'Argovie	Switzerland	1.HC	Simon Geschke (GER)	Giant–Shimano	
12–14 June	Tour of Małopolska	Poland	2.2	Maximilian Werda (GER)	Team Stölting	
12–15 June	Ronde de l'Oise	France	2.2	Magnus Cort (DEN)	Cult Energy–Vital Water	
15 June	Ronde van Limburg	Belgium	1.1	Mathieu van der Poel (NED)	BKCP–Powerplus	
15 June	GP Judendorf-Strassengel	Austria	1.2	Radoslav Rogina (CRO)	Adria Mobil	
18–22 June	Ster ZLM Toer	Netherlands	2.1	Philippe Gilbert (BEL)	BMC Racing Team	
19–22 June	Tour of Slovenia	Slovenia	2.1	Tiago Machado (POR)	NetApp–Endura	
19–22 June	Tour des Pays de Savoie	France	2.2	Louis Vervaeke (BEL)	Lotto–Belisol U23	
19–21 June	Tour de Serbie	Serbia	2.2	Jarosław Kowalczyk (POL)	BDC Marcpol	
20–22 June	Oberösterreichrundfahrt	Austria	2.2	Patrick Konrad (AUT)	Gourmetfein–Simplon Wels	
20–22 June	Route du Sud	France	2.1	Nicolas Roche (IRE)	Tinkoff–Saxo	
21–22 June	Memorial Grundmanna Wizowskiego	Poland	2.2	Błażej Janiaczyk (POL)	BDC Marcpol	
22 June	Beaumont Trophy	United Kingdom	1.2	Kristian House (GBR)	Rapha Condor–JLT	
22 June	Grand Prix Sarajevo	Bosnia and Herzegovina	1.2	Matej Marin (SLO)	Gourmetfein–Simplon Wels	
22 June	Flèche Ardennaise	Belgium	1.2	Stefan Küng (SUI)	BMC Development Team	
24 June	Giro dell'Appennino	Italy	1.1	Sonny Colbrelli (ITA)	Bardiani–CSF	
25 June	Halle–Ingooigem	Belgium	1.1	Arnaud Démare (FRA)	FDJ.fr	
25 June	I.W.T. Jong Maar Moedig	Belgium	1.2	Gijs Van Hoecke (BEL)	Topsport Vlaanderen–Baloise	

=== July ===
Date	Race name	Location	UCI Rating	Winner	Team	Ref
2–5 July	Course de la Solidarité Olympique	Poland	2.1	Kamil Zieliński (POL)	Mexller	
5 July	Omloop Het Nieuwsblad U23	Belgium	1.2	Dimitri Claeys (BEL)	VL Technics–Abutriek	
6–13 July	Österreich Rundfahrt	Austria	2.HC	Peter Kennaugh (GBR)	Team Sky	
10–13 July	Troféu Joaquim Agostinho	Portugal	2.2	Delio Fernández (ESP)	OFM–Quinta da Lixa	
11 July	European Road Championships – Time Trial	Czech Republic	CC	Stefan Küng (SUI)	Switzerland (national team)	
13 July	European Road Championships – Road race	Czech Republic	CC	Stefan Küng (SUI)	Switzerland (national team)	
13 July	La Ronde Pévèloise	France	1.2	Benoît Daeninck (FRA)	CC Nogent-sur-Oise	
13 July	Giro del Medio Brenta	Italy	1.2	Klemen Štimulak (SLO)	Adria Mobil	
15–20 July	Giro della Valle d'Aosta	Italy	2.2U	Bernardo Suaza (COL)	4-72 Colombia	
17–20 July	Cycling Tour of Sibiu	Romania	2.1	Radoslav Rogina (CRO)	Adria Mobil	
17–20 July	Czech Cycling Tour	Czech Republic	2.2	Martin Mortensen (DEN)	Cult Energy–Vital Water	
17–20 July	Volta a Portugal do Futuro	Portugal	2.2U	Ruben Guerreiro (POR)	Liberty Seguros–Feira–KTM	
25 July	Prueba Villafranca de Ordizia	Spain	1.1	Gorka Izagirre (ESP)	Movistar Team	
25 July	Košice–Miskolc	Hungary	1.2	Erik Baška (SVK)	Dukla Trenčín–Trek	
26–30 July	Tour de Wallonie	Belgium	2.HC	Gianni Meersman (BEL)	Omega Pharma–Quick-Step	
26 July	GP Industria & Artigianato di Larciano	Italy	1.1	Adam Yates (GBR)	Orica–GreenEDGE	
26 July	Szerencs–Ibrány	Hungary	1.2	Mamyr Stash (RUS)	Itera–Katusha	
27 July	Isaszeg–Budapest	Hungary	1.2	Erik Baška (SVK)	Dukla Trenčín–Trek	
27 July	Giro di Toscana	Italy	1.1	Pieter Weening (NED)	Orica–GreenEDGE	
27 July	GP Ville de Pérenchies	France	1.2	Gaëtan Bille (BEL)	Verandas Willems	
29 Jul–2 Aug	Dookoła Mazowsza	Poland	2.2	Jarosław Marycz (POL)	CCC–Polsat–Polkowice	
30 Jul–10 Aug	Volta a Portugal	Portugal	2.1	Gustavo César (ESP)	OFM–Quinta da Lixa	
30 Jul–3 Aug	Tour Alsace	France	2.2	Karel Hník (CZE)	Etixx	
31 July	Circuito de Getxo	Spain	1.1	Carlos Barbero (ESP)	Euskadi	

=== August ===
Date	Race name	Location	UCI Rating	Winner	Team	Ref
2–4 August	Kreiz Breizh Elites	France	2.2	Matteo Busato (ITA)	MG Kvis–Wilier	
3 August	Polynormande	France	1.1	Jan Ghyselinck (BEL)	Wanty–Groupe Gobert	
3 August	Trofeo Internazionale Bastianelli	Italy	1.2	Nicola Gaffurini (ITA)	Vega–Hotsand	
6–10 August	Danmark Rundt	Denmark	2.HC	Michael Valgren (DEN)	Tinkoff–Saxo	
7–9 August	Tour of Szeklerland	Romania	2.2	Stefan Hristov (BUL)	Brisaspor	
10 August	Antwerpse Havenpijl	Belgium	1.2	Yoeri Havik (NED)	Cyclingteam de Rijke	
10 August	Gran Premio di Poggiana	Italy	1.2U	Robert Power (AUS)	Australia (national team)	
10 August	RideLondon–Surrey Classic	United Kingdom	1.HC	Adam Blythe (GBR)	NFTO	
12–16 August	Tour de l'Ain	France	2.1	Bert-Jan Lindeman (NED)	Rabobank Development Team	
13–17 August	Vuelta a Burgos	Spain	2.HC	Nairo Quintana (COL)	Movistar Team	
13–17 August	Arctic Race of Norway	Norway	2.1	Steven Kruijswijk (NED)	Belkin Pro Cycling	
16 August	Grand Prix Královéhradeckého kraje	Czech Republic	1.2	Paweł Cieślik (POL)	Bauknecht–Author	
16 August	GP Capodarco	Italy	1.2	Robert Power (AUS)	Australia (national team)	
16 August	Memoriał Henryka Łasaka	Poland	1.2	Maciej Paterski (POL)	CCC–Polsat–Polkowice	
17 August	Puchar Uzdrowisk Karpackich	Poland	1.2	Paweł Franczak (POL)	ActiveJet	
19–22 August	Tour du Limousin	France	2.1	Mauro Finetto (ITA)	Neri Sottoli	
19 August	Grote Prijs Stad Zottegem	Belgium	1.1	Edward Theuns (BEL)	Topsport Vlaanderen–Baloise	
20–24 August	Baltic Chain Tour	Estonia; Latvia; Lithuania	2.2	Mathieu van der Poel (NED)	BKCP–Powerplus	
22 August	Arnhem–Veenendaal Classic	Netherlands	1.1	Yves Lampaert (BEL)	Topsport Vlaanderen–Baloise	
23 August	Puchar Ministra Obrony Narodowej	Poland	1.2	Konrad Dąbkowski (POL)	ActiveJet	
23–30 August	Tour de l'Avenir	France	2.Ncup	Miguel Ángel López (COL)	Colombia (national team)	
24 August	Châteauroux Classic	France	1.1	Iljo Keisse (BEL)	Omega Pharma–Quick-Step	
26 August	Grand Prix des Marbriers	France	1.2	Yann Guyot (FRA)	Armée de Terre	
26–29 August	Tour du Poitou-Charentes	France	2.1	Sylvain Chavanel (FRA)	IAM Cycling	
27 August	Druivenkoers Overijse	Belgium	1.1	Jonas van Genechten (BEL)	Lotto–Belisol	
30 August	Top Compétition	Belgium	1.2	Oliver Naesen (BEL)	Cibel	
31 August	Ronde van Midden-Nederland	Netherlands	1.2	Wim Stroetinga (NED)	Koga Cycling Team	
31 August	Croatia–Slovenia	Slovenia	1.2	Primož Roglič (SLO)	Adria Mobil	

=== September ===
Date	Race name	Location	UCI Rating	Winner	Team	Ref
2–6 September	Giro della Regione Friuli Venezia Giulia	Italy	2.2	Simone Antonini (ITA)	Marchiol–Emisfero	
4–7 September	Okolo Jižních Čech	Czech Republic	2.2	Reidar Borgersen (NOR)	Team Joker	
6 September	Brussels Cycling Classic	Belgium	1.HC	André Greipel (GER)	Lotto–Belisol	
7 September	Grand Prix de Fourmies	France	1.HC	Jonas van Genechten (BEL)	Lotto–Belisol	
7 September	Kernen Omloop Echt-Susteren	Netherlands	1.2	Phil Bauhaus (GER)	Team Stölting	
7–14 September	Tour of Britain	United Kingdom	2.HC	Dylan van Baarle (NED)	Garmin–Sharp	
13 September	De Kustpijl	Belgium	1.2	Michael Van Staeyen (BEL)	Topsport Vlaanderen–Baloise	
13 September	Tour du Jura	Switzerland	1.2	Kévin Ledanois (FRA)	France (national team)	
13 September	Tour Bohemia	Czech Republic	1.2	Lukas Pöstlberger (AUT)	Tirol Cycling Team	
14 September	Chrono Champenois	France	1.2	Rasmus Quaade (DEN)	Team TreFor–Blue Water	
14 September	Grote Prijs Jef Scherens	Belgium	1.1	André Greipel (GER)	Lotto–Belisol	
14 September	Tour du Doubs	France	1.1	Rein Taaramäe (EST)	Cofidis	
16 September	Coppa Bernocchi	Italy	1.1	Elia Viviani (ITA)	Cannondale	
17 September	Grand Prix de Wallonie	Belgium	1.1	Greg Van Avermaet (BEL)	BMC Racing Team	
17 September	Coppa Ugo Agostoni	Italy	1.1	Niccolò Bonifazio (ITA)	Lampre–Merida	
18 September	Tre Valli Varesine	Italy	1.HC	Michael Albasini (SUI)	Orica–GreenEDGE	
19 September	Kampioenschap van Vlaanderen	Belgium	1.1	Arnaud Démare (FRA)	FDJ.fr	
20 September	Grand Prix Impanis-Van Petegem	Belgium	1.1	Greg Van Avermaet (BEL)	BMC Racing Team	
20 September	Memorial Marco Pantani	Italy	1.1	Sonny Colbrelli (ITA)	Bardiani–CSF	
21 September	Grand Prix d'Isbergues	France	1.1	Arnaud Démare (FRA)	FDJ.fr	
21 September	Gran Premio Industria e Commercio di Prato	Italy	1.1	Sonny Colbrelli (ITA)	Bardiani–CSF	
21 September	Baronie Breda Classic	Netherlands	1.2	Mike Teunissen (NED)	Rabobank Development Team	
24 September	Omloop van het Houtland	Belgium	1.1	Jelle Wallays (BEL)	Topsport Vlaanderen–Baloise	
27–28 September	Tour du Gévaudan	France	2.1	Amets Txurruka (ESP)	Caja Rural–Seguros RGA	
28 September	Gooikse Pijl	Belgium	1.2	Roy Jans (BEL)	Wanty–Groupe Gobert	
28 September	Duo Normand	France	1.1	Truls Korsæth (NOR); Reidar Borgersen (NOR)	Team Joker	
30 September	Ruota d'Oro	Italy	1.2U	Giacomo Berlato (ITA)	Zalf–Euromobil–Désirée–Fior	

=== October ===
Date	Race name	Location	UCI Rating	Winner	Team	Ref
1 October	Milano–Torino	Italy	1.HC	Giampaolo Caruso (ITA)	Team Katusha	
2–5 October	Tour de l'Eurométropole	Belgium	2.1	Arnaud Démare (FRA)	FDJ.fr	
2–6 October	Tour of Kavkaz	Russia	2.2	Sergey Firsanov (RUS)	RusVelo	
3 October	Sparkassen Münsterland Giro	Germany	1.1	André Greipel (GER)	Lotto–Belisol	
4 October	Piccolo Giro di Lombardia	Italy	1.2	Gianni Moscon (ITA)	Zalf–Euromobil–Désirée–Fior	
5 October	Tour de Vendée	France	1.1	Armindo Fonseca (FRA)	Bretagne–Séché Environnement	
7 October	Binche–Tournai–Binche	Belgium	1.1	Zdeněk Štybar (CZE)	Omega Pharma–Quick-Step	
9 October	Paris–Bourges	France	1.1	John Degenkolb (GER)	Giant–Shimano	
9 October	Coppa Sabatini	Italy	1.1	Sonny Colbrelli (ITA)	Bardiani–CSF	
11 October	Giro dell'Emilia	Italy	1.HC	Davide Rebellin (ITA)	CCC–Polsat–Polkowice	
12 October	GP Bruno Beghelli	Italy	1.HC	Valerio Conti (ITA)	Lampre–Merida	
12 October	Paris–Tours Espoirs	France	1.2U	Mike Teunissen (NED)	Rabobank Development Team	
12 October	Paris–Tours	France	1.HC	Jelle Wallays (BEL)	Topsport Vlaanderen–Baloise	
14 October	Nationale Sluitingsprijs	Belgium	1.1	Jens Debusschere (BEL)	Lotto–Belisol	
19 October	Chrono des Nations	France	1.1	Sylvain Chavanel (FRA)	IAM Cycling	

== Final standings ==
There was a competition for the rider, team and country with the most points gained from winning or achieving a high place in the above races.

=== Individual classification ===
Rank	Name	Team	Points
1	Tom Van Asbroeck (BEL)	Topsport Vlaanderen–Baloise	764
2	Sonny Colbrelli (ITA)	Bardiani–CSF	708
3	Davide Rebellin (ITA)	CCC–Polsat–Polkowice	435
4	Magnus Cort (DEN)	Cult Energy–Vital Water	428
5	Mauro Finetto (ITA)	Neri Sottoli	428
6	Sylvain Chavanel (FRA)	IAM Cycling	410
7	Julien Simon (FRA)	Cofidis	377
8	Simone Ponzi (ITA)	Neri Sottoli	368
9	Ilnur Zakarin (RUS)	RusVelo	349.8
10	Bert-Jan Lindeman (NED)	Rabobank Development Team	327

=== Teams classification ===
Rank	Team	Points
1	Topsport Vlaanderen–Baloise	2036
2	Wanty–Groupe Gobert	1538
3	Cofidis	1401
4	Neri Sottoli	1275.5
5	IAM Cycling	1268
6	Bardiani–CSF	1219
7	CCC–Polsat–Polkowice	1182
8	RusVelo	1165.4
9	NetApp–Endura	1000.6
10	Bretagne–Séché Environnement	946

=== Nations classification ===
Rank	Nation	Points
1	Italy	3061.17
2	Belgium	2871.67
3	France	2227
4	Spain	1760
5	Netherlands	1759.4
6	Russia	1702.69
7	Poland	1657.5
8	Ukraine	1590
9	Slovenia	1487
10	Denmark	1228.25

=== Nations under-23 classification ===
Rank	Nation	Points
1	Netherlands	960.85
2	Belgium	814.17
3	Denmark	765.25
4	Italy	725.67
5	France	721.25
6	Norway	714
7	Germany	714
8	Great Britain	487.5
9	Russia	441.67
10	Austria	388
