= Geert van der Weijst =

Dutch bicycle racer

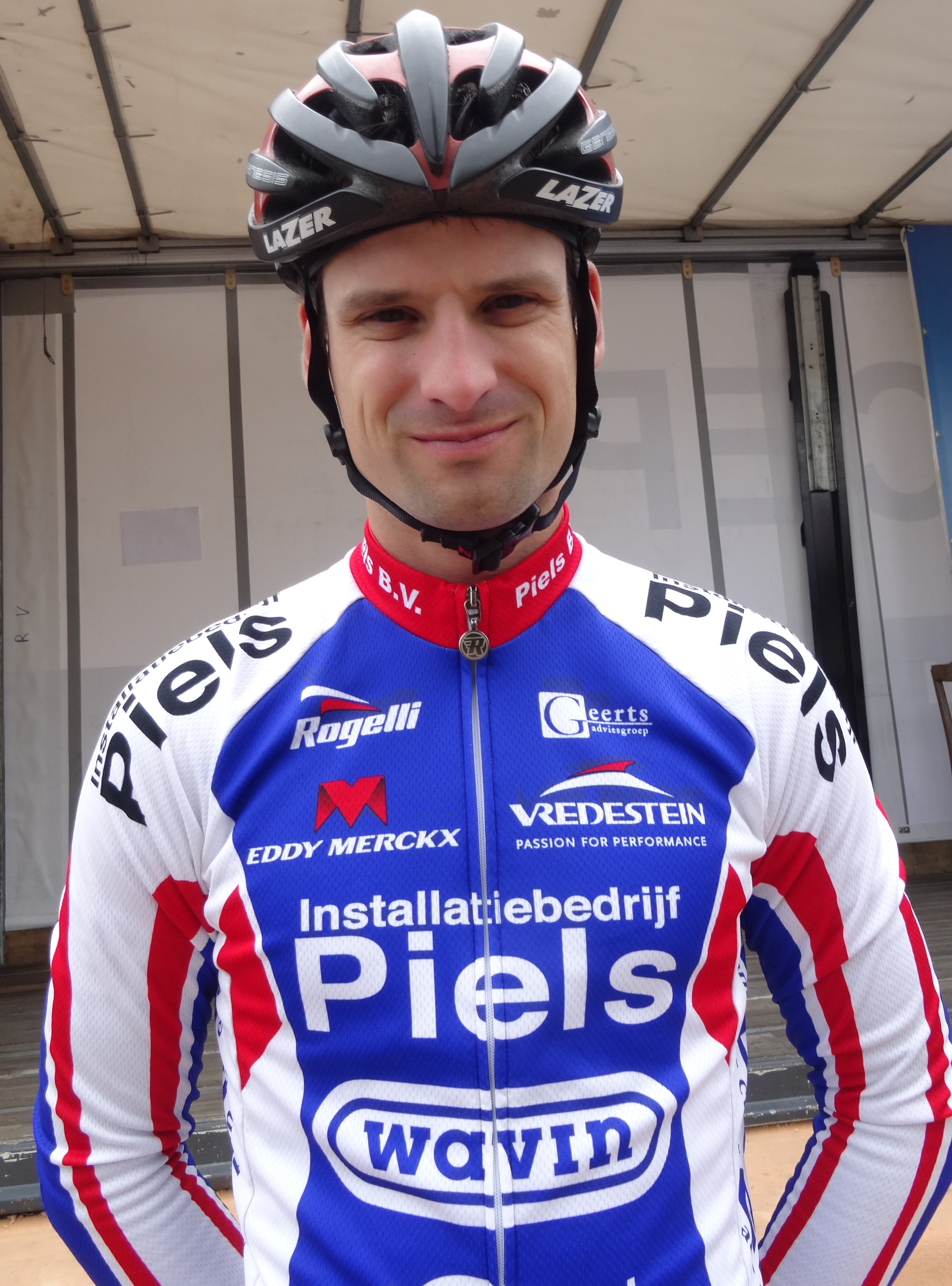
- Van der Weijst in 2014

Personal information
- Full name: Geert van der Weijst
- Born: 6 April 1990 (age 36) Reusel

Cycling career
- Sport: Cycling
- Current team: Retired
- Discipline: Road
- Role: Rider

Professional teams
- 2012–2014: Cycling Team Jo Piels
- 2015: Team3M

Geert van der Weijst (born 6 April 1990) is a Dutch former professional cyclist who rode professionally between 2012 and 2015 for the Cycling Team Jo Piels and Team3M squads.

== Major results ==
2011
8th Kernen Omloop Echt-Susteren
2012
5th Dorpenomloop Rucphen
7th Overall Tour de Gironde

1st Stage 3

2013
1st Rund um Düren
Tour de Gironde

1st Points classification
1st Stage 4

1st Stage 3 Kreiz Breizh Elites
4th Ronde van Midden-Nederland
9th Overall Oberösterreich Rundfahrt
10th Beverbeek Classic
2014
Tour de Gironde

1st Points classification
1st Stage 5

4th Gooikse Pijl
6th Overall Tour du Loir-et-Cher

1st Points classification
1st Stage 1

6th Ronde van Overijssel
7th Overall Olympia's Tour

1st Stage 2 (TTT)

7th Münsterland Giro
8th Ster van Zwolle
8th Zuid Oost Drenthe Classic I
8th Ronde van Midden-Nederland
2015
1st Omloop van het Waasland
