= Maarten van Trijp =

Dutch cyclist

Personal information
- Born: 6 October 1993 (age 33) Bergen op Zoom, Netherlands
- Height: 1.87 m (6 ft 2 in)

Cycling career
- Sport: Cycling
- Current team: Retired
- Discipline: Road
- Role: Rider

Amateur teams
- 2009–2011: Avia-Performance
- 2012: Lotto–Belisol U23

Professional teams
- 2013–2015: Rabobank Development Team
- 2016–2017: Metec–TKH
- 2018: Destil–Parkhotel Valkenburg
- 2019: Corendon–Circus

Maarten van Trijp (born 6 October 1993 in Bergen op Zoom) is a Dutch former professional cyclist, who competed professionally between 2013 and 2019 for the Rabobank Development Team, Metec–TKH, Destil–Parkhotel Valkenburg and Corendon–Circus teams.

== Major results ==
2010
1st Omloop der Vlaamse Gewesten
2nd Overall Sint-Martinusprijs Kontich
2011
1st GP Bati-Metallo
1st Stage 3 Niedersachsen-Rundfahrt
3rd Paris–Roubaix Juniors
2012
9th Arno Wallaard Memorial
2013
2nd Ronde van Midden-Nederland
5th Overall Tour de Gironde

1st Stage 1

5th Kernen Omloop Echt-Susteren
6th Ster van Zwolle
6th Omloop der Kempen
8th ZLM Tour
2014
5th Kernen Omloop Echt-Susteren
5th Nationale Sluitingsprijs
9th Ronde van Overijssel
2016
1st Arno Wallaard Memorial
2017
1st Dorpenomloop Rucphen
1st Circuit de Wallonie
4th ZODC Zuidenveld Tour
5th Arno Wallaard Memorial
2018
1st Stage 2 Tour de Serbie
2nd PWZ Zuidenveld Tour
2nd Ronde van Midden-Nederland
3rd Dorpenomloop Rucphen
8th Arno Wallaard Memorial
