= Arno Wallaard =

Dutch bicycle racer

Personal information
- Born: 13 October 1979 Noordeloos, Netherlands
- Died: 28 February 2006 (aged 26) Noordeloos, Netherlands

Cycling career
- Sport: Cycling
- Discipline: Road
- Role: Rider

Amateur team
- 2000–2001: Cyclingteam Tegeltoko

Professional teams
- 2003: Quick Step–Davitamon–Latexco
- 2004: AXA Cycling Team
- 2005: Bert Story–Piels
- 2006: Skil–Shimano

Arno Wallaard (13 October 1979 in Noordeloos – 28 February 2006 in Noordeloos) was a Dutch cyclist. He died on 28 February 2006, after feeling sick coming home from training. The cycling race Omloop Alblasserwaard, which Wallaard won in 1999, was renamed the Arno Wallaard Memorial in honor of him.

== Major results ==
1999
1st Omloop Alblasserwaard
2001
1st Road race, National Under-23 Road Championships
1st Stage 3 Thüringen Rundfahrt der U23
1st Stage 2 Transalsace
10th Road race, UEC European Under-23 Road Championships
2002
1st Stage 3 Ronde van Antwerpen
3rd Ronde van Overijssel
2003
10th Overall Olympia's Tour
2004
1st Stage 4 Olympia's Tour
1st Profronde van Fryslan (with 21 others)
3rd Ster van Zwolle
7th Ronde van Noord-Holland
7th Ronde van Midden-Nederland
8th ZLM Tour
2005
1st Ronde van Overijssel
2nd Ronde van Midden-Nederland
2nd Grand Prix Möbel Alvisse
2nd De Parel van de Veluwe
3rd Ronde van Vlaams-Brabant
