= Stefan Poutsma =

Dutch cyclist (born 1991)

Personal information
- Full name: Stefan Poutsma
- Born: 10 September 1991 (age 35) Peize, Netherlands

Cycling career
- Sport: Cycling
- Current team: Retired
- Discipline: Road
- Role: Rider

Amateur team
- 2009–2011: WV De Kanibaal

Professional team
- 2012–2016: Cycling Team Jo Piels

Stefan Poutsma (born 10 September 1991) is a Dutch former professional racing cyclist, who rode professionally for Cyclingteam Jo Piels from 2012 to 2016. He rode at the 2013 UCI Road World Championships.

== Major results ==
2012
3rd Overall Tour de Berlin
9th Kernen Omloop Echt-Susteren
2013
1st Overall Carpathian Couriers Race

1st Stage 3

1st Omloop van de Schermer
2014
1st Lus Van Roden
1st Stage 2 (TTT) Olympia's Tour
4th Overall Okolo Jižních Čech
2015
1st Stage 1a (TTT) Olympia's Tour
1st Stage 2 Dookoła Mazowsza
1st Mountains classification Ronde van Midden-Nederland
4th Overall Podlasie Tour

1st Stage 2

8th Dorpenomloop Rucphen
8th Omloop Het Nieuwsblad U23
9th GP Horsens
2016
10th ZODC Zuidenveld Tour
