= Marco Bos =

Dutch cyclist

Personal information
- Born: 5 July 1979 (age 47) Roden, Netherlands

Cycling career
- Sport: Cycling
- Current team: Retired
- Discipline: Road
- Role: Rider

Professional teams
- 2003: Cycling Team Löwik–Tegeltoko
- 2004: BankGiroLoterij
- 2005: Shimano-Memory Corp
- 2006–2011: Cyclingteam Jo Piels

Marco Bos (born 5 July 1979 in Roden) is a former Dutch cyclist.

== Palmarès ==
2001
1st Mainfranken-Tour
3rd Grote Prijs Stad Geel
2002
1st Ster van Zwolle
1st stage 1 OZ Wielerweekend
2003
2nd Ster van Zwolle
3rd Dorpenomloop Rucphen
2005
3rd Ronde van Overijssel
3rd Profronde van Fryslan
2006
1st stage 3 Olympia's Tour
2007
1st Ronde van Overijssel
1st Ronde van Midden-Nederland
2009
2nd Ster van Zwolle
3rd Dorpenomloop Rucphen
3rd Ronde van Midden-Nederland
