= Stef Krul =

Dutch cyclist (born 1995)

Personal information
- Full name: Stef Krul
- Born: 15 July 1995 (age 31) Grou, Netherlands
- Height: 1.86 m (6 ft 1 in)
- Weight: 68 kg (150 lb; 10 st 10 lb)

Cycling career
- Sport: Cycling
- Current team: NWV Groningen
- Discipline: Road
- Role: Rider

Amateur team
- 2021–: NWV Groningen

Professional teams
- 2014–2020: Metec–TKH
- 2019: Team Jumbo–Visma (stagiaire)

Stef Krul (born 15 July 1995) is a Dutch racing cyclist, who currently rides for Dutch amateur team NWV Groningen.

== Personal life ==
Away from cycling, Krul is studying for an econometrics degree.

== Major results ==
2013
2nd Time trial, National Junior Road Championships
2nd Omloop der Vlaamse Gewesten
3rd Overall Internationale Niedersachsen-Rundfahrt der Junioren

1st Stage 2 (ITT)

5th Overall Sint-Martinusprijs Kontich
6th Overall Keizer der Juniores
6th Omloop Mandel-Leie-Schelde Juniors
2014
1st Stage 1 (TTT) Czech Cycling Tour
6th Zuid Oost Drenthe Classic I
8th Time trial, National Under-23 Road Championships
2016
8th Time trial, National Under-23 Road Championships
2017
National Under-23 Road Championships

2nd Road race
6th Time trial

3rd ZODC Zuidenveld Tour
10th Overall Olympia's Tour
2018
1st PWZ Zuidenveld Tour
2019
3rd Overall Tour du Loir-et-Cher
3rd Overall Flèche du Sud
6th Overall Tour de Normandie
6th Overall Kreiz Breizh Elites
7th Overall Rhône-Alpes Isère Tour
