= Tom Vermeer =

Dutch cyclist

Personal information
- Full name: Tom Vermeer
- Born: 28 December 1985 (age 40) Maastricht, Netherlands

Cycling career
- Sport: Cycling
- Current team: Shifting Gears
- Discipline: Road
- Role: Rider

Amateur teams
- 2008: Metec
- 2009–2010: United
- 2015: Profel United
- 2019: Tops Antiek–Glascenter HCT
- 2020–2022: Acrog–Tormans
- 2023–: Shifting Gears

Professional teams
- 2011: Colba–Mercury
- 2012: Nutrixxion–Abus
- 2013–2014: Cycling Team Jo Piels
- 2016: Baby-Dump Cyclingteam
- 2017–2018: Differdange–Losch

Tom Vermeer (born 28 December 1985) is a Dutch cyclist, who currently rides for Belgian amateur team Shifting Gears.

== Major results ==
2011
8th Grand Prix Impanis-Van Petegem
2012
6th Overall Five Rings of Moscow
7th Overall Tour of China II
2013
1st Ronde van Overijssel
1st Mountains classification, Czech Cycling Tour
1st Stage 4 Tour du Loir-et-Cher
3rd Beverbeek Classic
4th De Kustpijl
5th Overall Kreiz Breizh Elites
2014
8th Grand Prix des Marbriers
9th Omloop der Kempen
10th Overall Kreiz Breizh Elites
2017
6th Kernen Omloop Echt-Susteren
7th De Kustpijl
10th Omloop Mandel-Leie-Schelde
2023
1st Road race, National Amateur Road Championships
