= Josan–To Win =

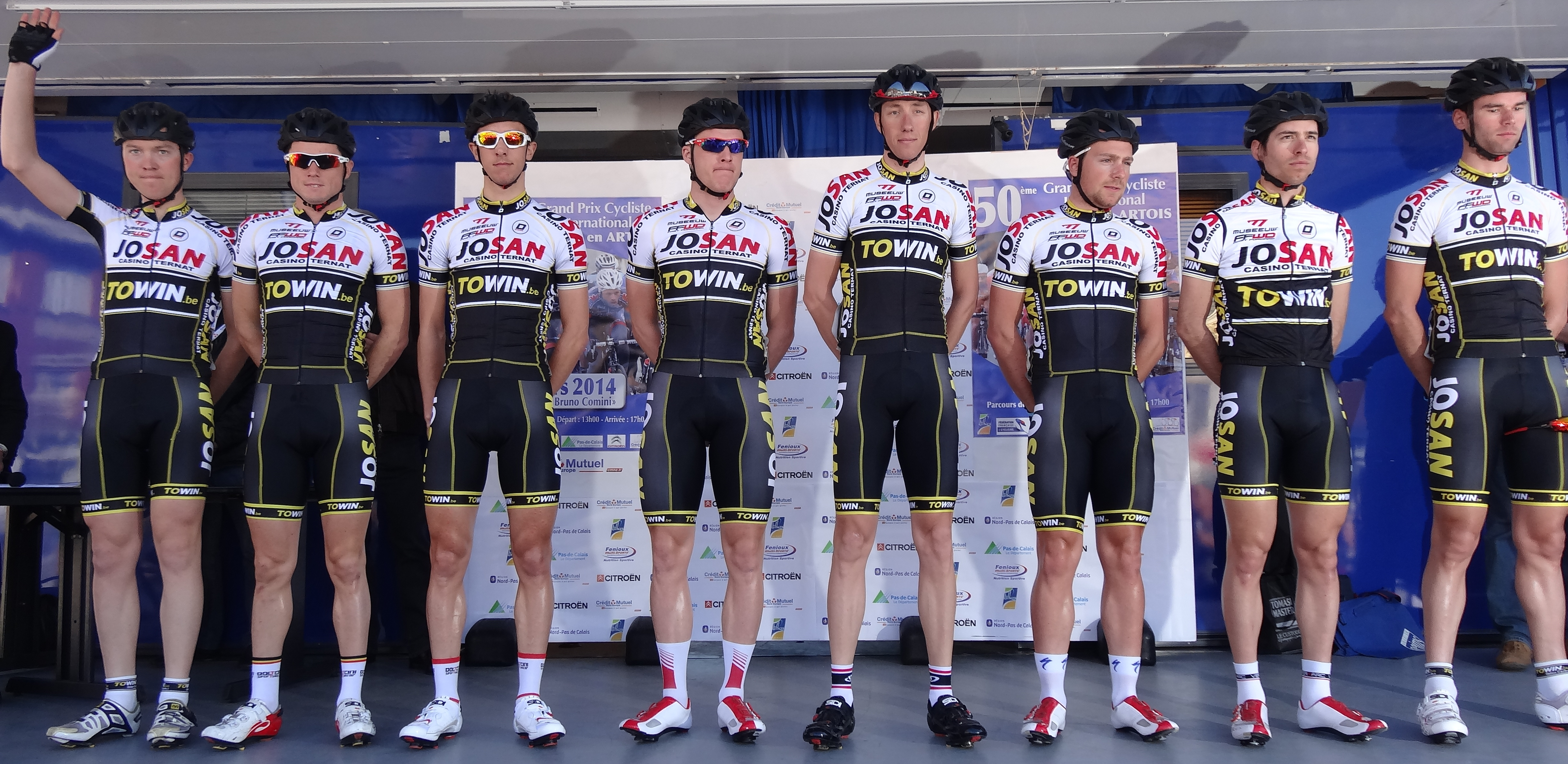

Team information
- UCI code: JTW
- Registered: Belgium
- Founded: 2005
- Disbanded: 2014
- Discipline: Road
- Status: UCI Continental
- Bicycles: Museeuw

Key personnel
- General manager: Willy Teirlinck
- Team managers: Willy Teirlinck; Humbert Deprez

Team name history
- 2013 2014: To Win–Josan; Josan–To Win
Josan–To Win jersey
Jersey

Josan–To Win was a Belgian UCI Continental cycling team founded in 2013 and disbanded in 2014.
