= Yoann Barbas =

French cyclist (born 1988)

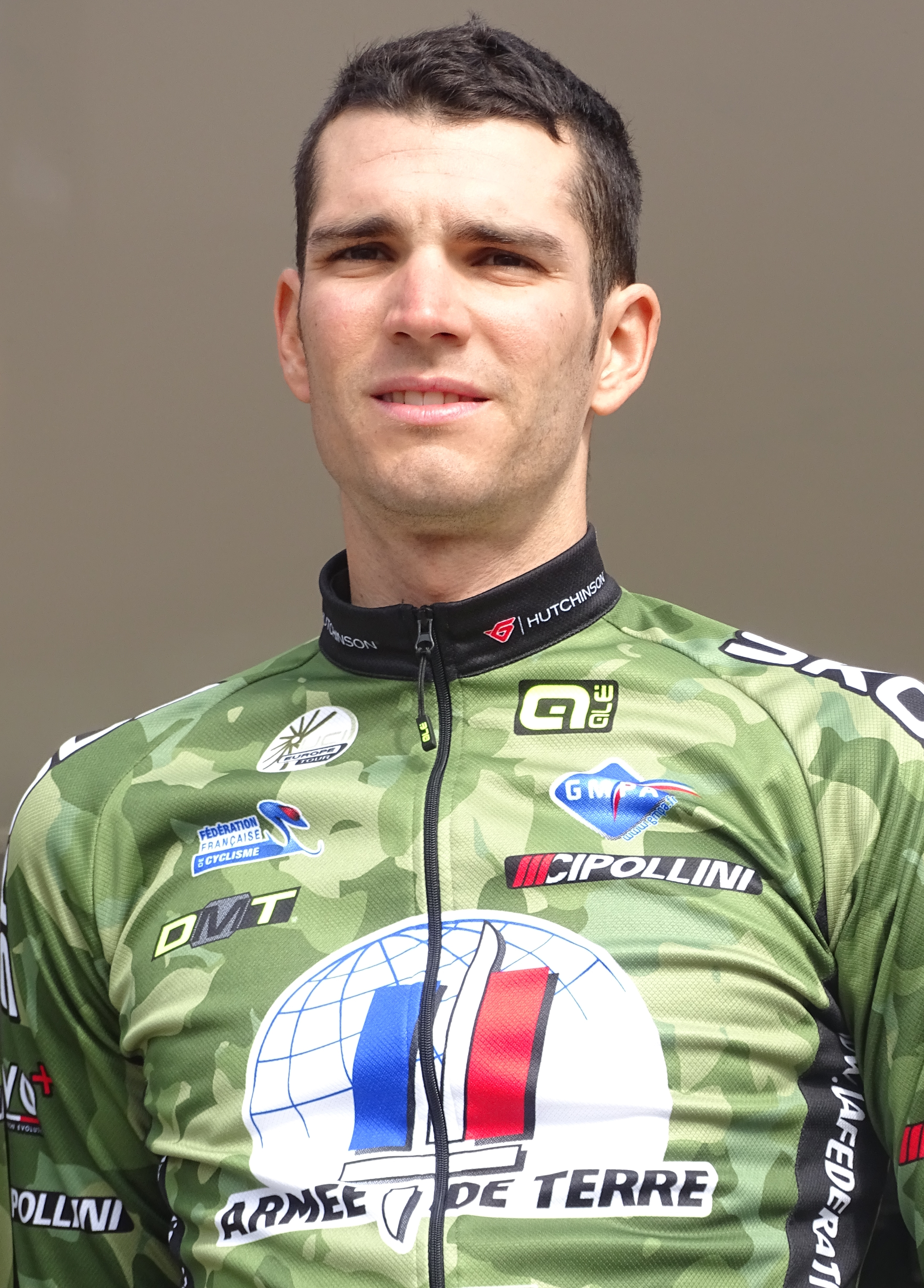
- Barbas in 2015

Personal information
- Born: 24 October 1988 (age 37) Lavelanet, France

Cycling career
- Sport: Cycling
- Current team: Retired
- Discipline: Road
- Role: Rider

Amateur teams
- 2007–2009: Albi VS
- 2010–2011: Chambéry CF
- 2012–2014: Armée de Terre
- 2017: AVC Aix-en-Provence

Professional team
- 2015–2016: Armée de Terre

Yoann Barbas (born 24 October 1988 in Lavelanet) is a French former professional road cyclist.

== Major results ==
2009
3rd Overall Ronde de l'Isard
7th Overall Tour des Pays de Savoie
2010
4th Overall Ronde de l'Isard
5th Overall Tour des Pays de Savoie
2011
9th Overall Giro della Valle d'Aosta
2012
3rd Overall Tour des Pays de Savoie
2013
1st Overall Tour des Pays de Savoie
9th Overall Tour Alsace
2014
4th Overall Tour des Pays de Savoie
2016
Troféu Joaquim Agostinho

1st Mountains classification
1st Combination classification
