= Jeff Vermeulen =

Dutch cyclist

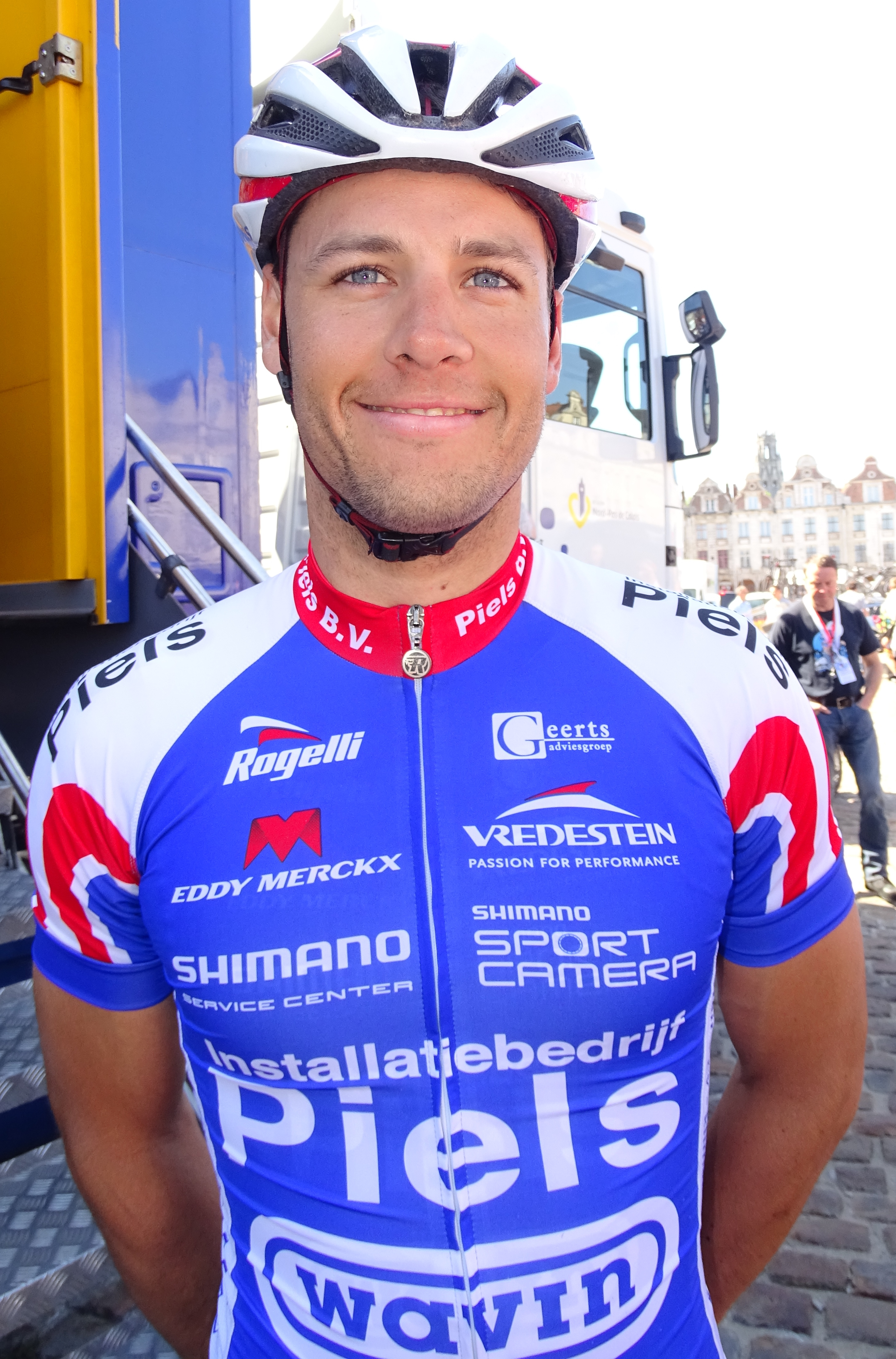
- Vermeulen at the 2015 Paris–Arras Tour.

Personal information
- Full name: Jeff Vermeulen
- Born: 7 October 1988 (age 38) Zwolle, the Netherlands

Cycling career
- Sport: Cycling
- Current team: Retired
- Discipline: Road
- Role: Rider

Amateur teams
- 2008: Asito Cycling Team
- 2018: VolkerWessels–Merckx Cycling Team

Professional teams
- 2009: AA Cycling Team
- 2010: Koga–CreditForce–Ubbink Track
- 2011: Cycling Team De Rijke
- 2012–2014: Metec Continental Cyclingteam
- 2015–2017: Cyclingteam Jo Piels

Jeff Vermeulen (born 7 October 1988 in Zwolle) is a Dutch former professional racing cyclist.

== Major results ==
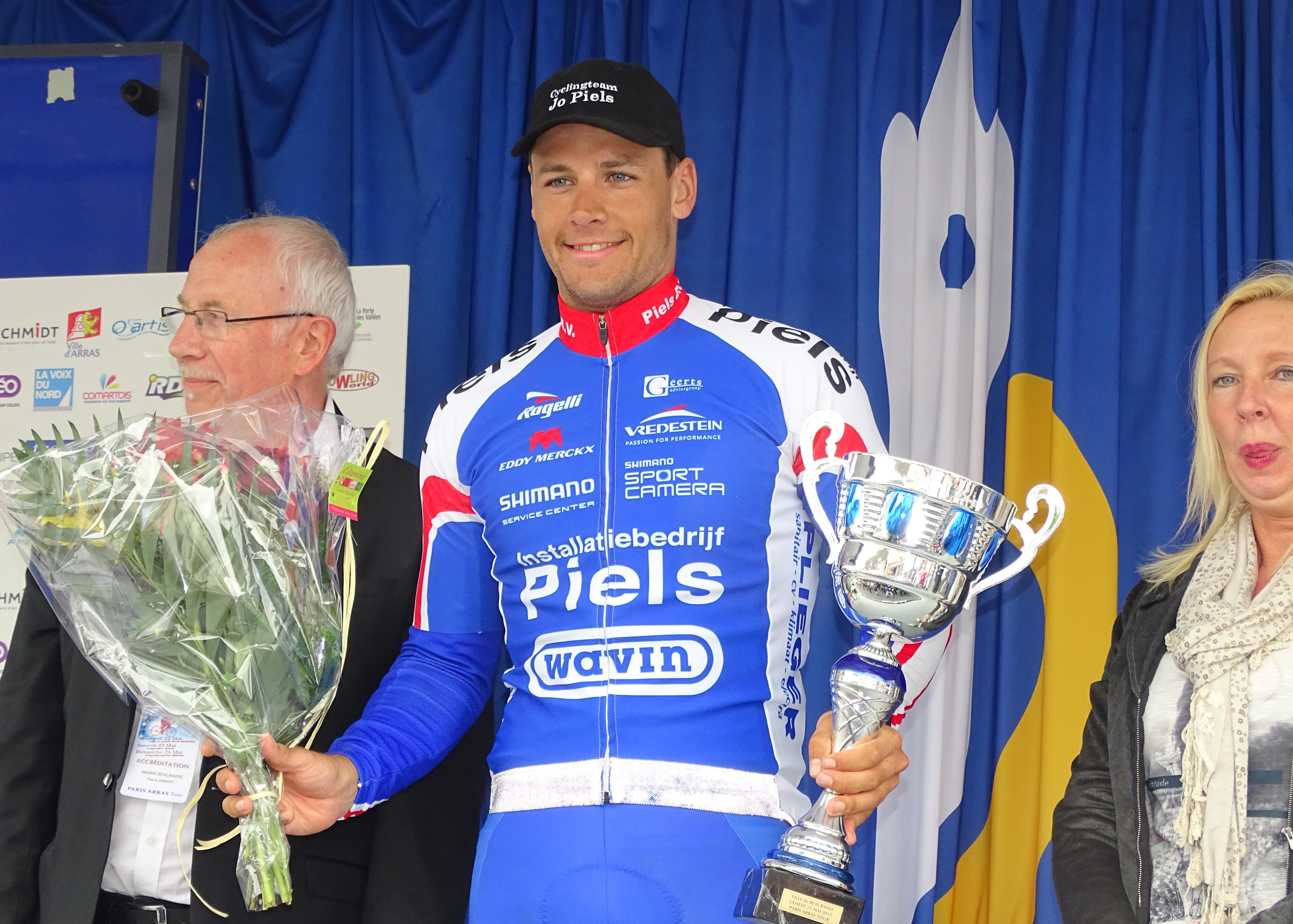
Vermeulen at the 2015 Paris–Arras Tour, where he won stage two.

2004
1st Sprint, National Novice Track Championships
2005
1st Individual pursuit, National Junior Track Championships
2006
2nd Madison, National Track Championships (with Pim Ligthart)
2007
National Track Championships

1st Derny
2nd Points race
2nd Scratch
3rd Madison (with Pim Ligthart)

1st Omloop van de Hoekse Waard
1st UIV Cup Munich, U23
2008
3rd Points race, National Track Championships
2009
National Track Championships

2nd Individual pursuit
2nd Madison (with Pim Ligthart)

8th Ronde van Midden-Nederland
10th Antwerpse Havenpijl
2012
1st Stage 3 Olympia's Tour
1st Stage 1 Course de la Solidarité Olympique
2nd Ronde van Noord-Holland
2013
1st Zuid Oost Drenthe Classic I
Olympia's Tour

1st Points classification
1st Stages 1 & 3

1st Mountains classification Tour du Loir-et-Cher
4th Ster van Zwolle
4th Ronde van Overijssel
2015
1st Zuid Oost Drenthe Classic I
1st Ronde van Overijssel
1st Parel van de Veluwe
Olympia's Tour

1st Stages 1a (TTT) & 4

1st Stage 2 Paris–Arras Tour
7th Ster van Zwolle
8th Overall Dookoła Mazowsza
2016
1st Ster van Zwolle
1st Stage 5 Tour du Loir-et-Cher
