= Bert-Jan Lindeman =

Dutch cyclist

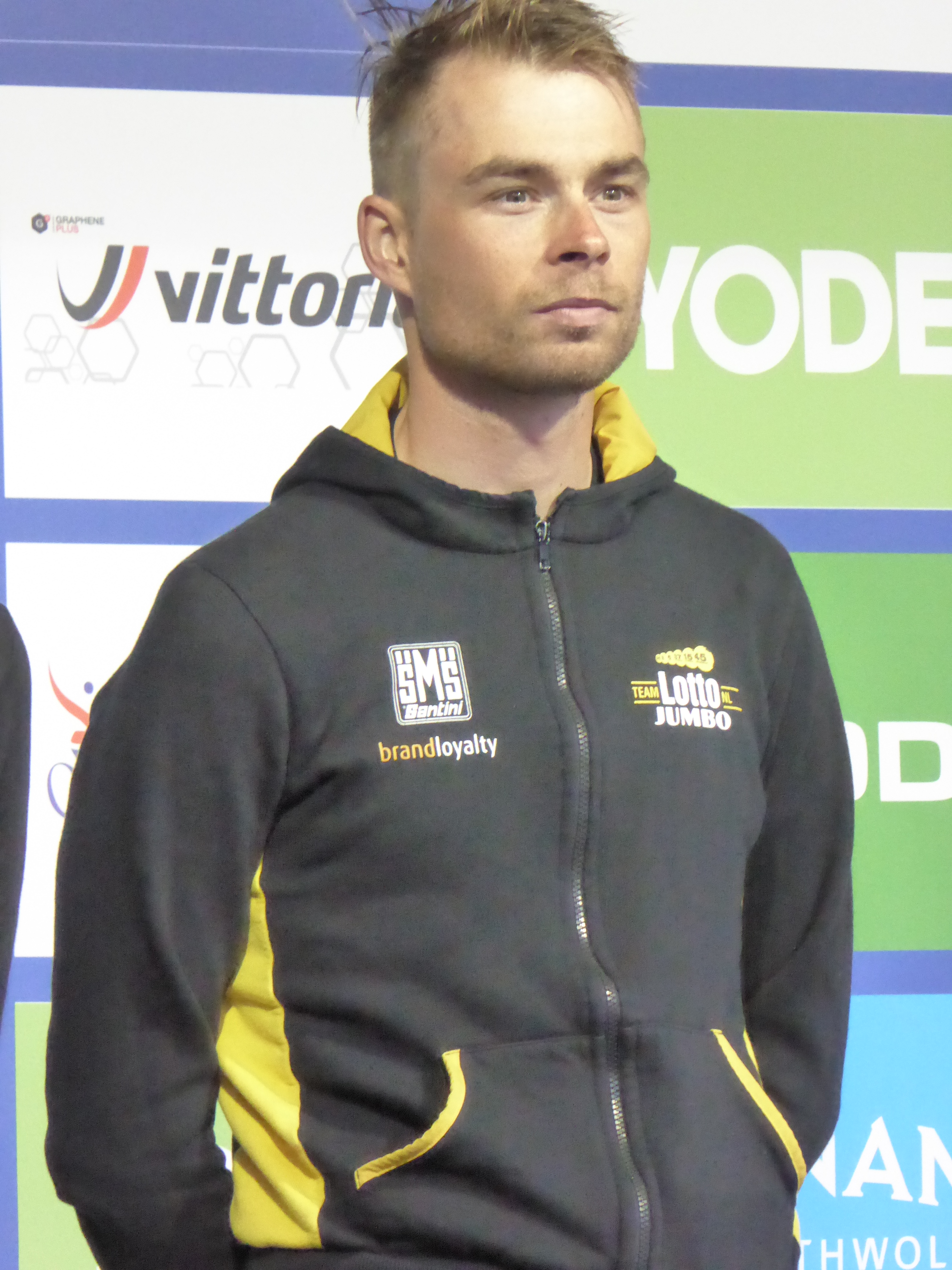
- Lindeman at the 2016 Tour of Britain

Personal information
- Full name: Bert-Jan Lindeman
- Born: 16 June 1989 (age 37) Emmen, Netherlands
- Height: 1.80 m (5 ft 11 in)
- Weight: 69 kg (152 lb; 10.9 st)

Cycling career
- Sport: Cycling
- Current team: VolkerWessels Cycling Team
- Discipline: Road
- Role: Rider
- Rider type: Classics rider

Amateur teams
- 2008: WRV KrolstonE–Peddelaars
- 2008: Asito Cycling Team
- 2011: Vacansoleil–DCM (stagiaire)

Professional teams
- 2009: KrolStonE Continental Team
- 2010–2011: Cycling Team Jo Piels
- 2012–2013: Vacansoleil–DCM
- 2014: Rabobank Development Team
- 2015–2020: LottoNL–Jumbo
- 2021: Team Qhubeka Assos
- 2022–: VolkerWessels Cycling Team

Major wins
- Grand Tours Vuelta a España 1 individual stage (2015)

Bert-Jan Lindeman (born 16 June 1989) is a Dutch professional road bicycle racer, who currently rides for UCI Continental team VolkerWessels Cycling Team. His older brother Adrie is also a cyclist, who last rode for the Koga team in the Netherlands.

== Career ==
Born in Emmen, Lindeman has competed as a professional since 2009, and competed for the KrolStonE Continental Team and Cycling Team Jo Piels, before joining Vacansoleil–DCM in the second half of 2011 as a stagiaire. Lindeman remained with Vacansoleil–DCM after his stint as a stagiaire, having signed a two-year deal from 2012. In March 2012, Lindeman achieved his first victory with the team, by winning the Ronde van Drenthe; after initiating a breakaway with Guillaume Boivin (SpiderTech–C10), Lindeman out-sprinted Boivin for the victory.

Lindeman joined the Rabobank Development Team for the 2014 season, after his previous team – Vacansoleil–DCM – folded at the end of the 2013 season. He then moved to the senior team, LottoNL–Jumbo for the 2015 season. Lindeman took his first win for the team in the 2015 Vuelta a España, winning stage 7 from the breakaway. He was named in the start list for the 2016 Tour de France.

In December 2020, Lindeman signed a one-year contract with Team Qhubeka Assos, for the 2021 season. With that team encountering financial issues, Lindeman moved to the VolkerWessels Cycling Team for the 2022 season.

== Major results ==
2008
1st Ronde van Groningen
1st Prix des Flandres Françaises
2nd PWZ Zuidenveld Tour
8th Scandinavian Open Road Race
2009
2nd Ronde van Midden-Brabant
2nd Ronde van Limburg
4th Dorpenomloop door Drenthe
6th Tour de Seoul
2010
1st Ster van Zwolle
1st Stage 3 Tour de Gironde
2nd Overall Festningsrittet
3rd Ronde van Haarlemmerliede en Spaarnwoude
4th Eschborn–Frankfurt Under-23
10th Ronde van Noord-Holland
2011
1st Hel van Voerendaal
4th Ster van Zwolle
4th Liège–Bastogne–Liège Espoirs
10th Overall Tour de Gironde
2012
1st Ronde van Drenthe
1st Mountains classification, Étoile de Bessèges
3rd Road race, National Road Championships
2014
1st Overall Tour de l'Ain

1st Stage 3

1st Overall Tour de Bretagne

1st Sprints classification

1st Ster van Zwolle
2nd Dwars door Drenthe
3rd Ronde van Drenthe
4th Grand Prix de la ville de Pérenchies
5th Omloop Het Nieuwsblad U23
6th Tro-Bro Léon
7th Overall Tour Alsace
2015
1st Stage 7 Vuelta a España
2nd Ronde van Drenthe
Giro d'Italia

Held after Stage 2

2017
5th Brabantse Pijl
2020
8th Dwars door het Hageland
2022
2nd Overall Olympia's Tour
10th Visit Friesland Elfsteden Race

=== Grand Tour general classification results timeline ===
Grand Tour	2012	2013	2014	2015	2016	2017	2018	2019	2020	2021
Giro d'Italia	—	—	—	95	—	—	114	—	—	122
Tour de France	—	—	—	—	94	—	—	—	—	—
Vuelta a España	143	—	—	99	—	110	136	—	—	131

Legend
—	Did not compete
IP	In progress
DNF	Did not finish
