= Jochem Hoekstra =

Dutch cyclist (born 1992)

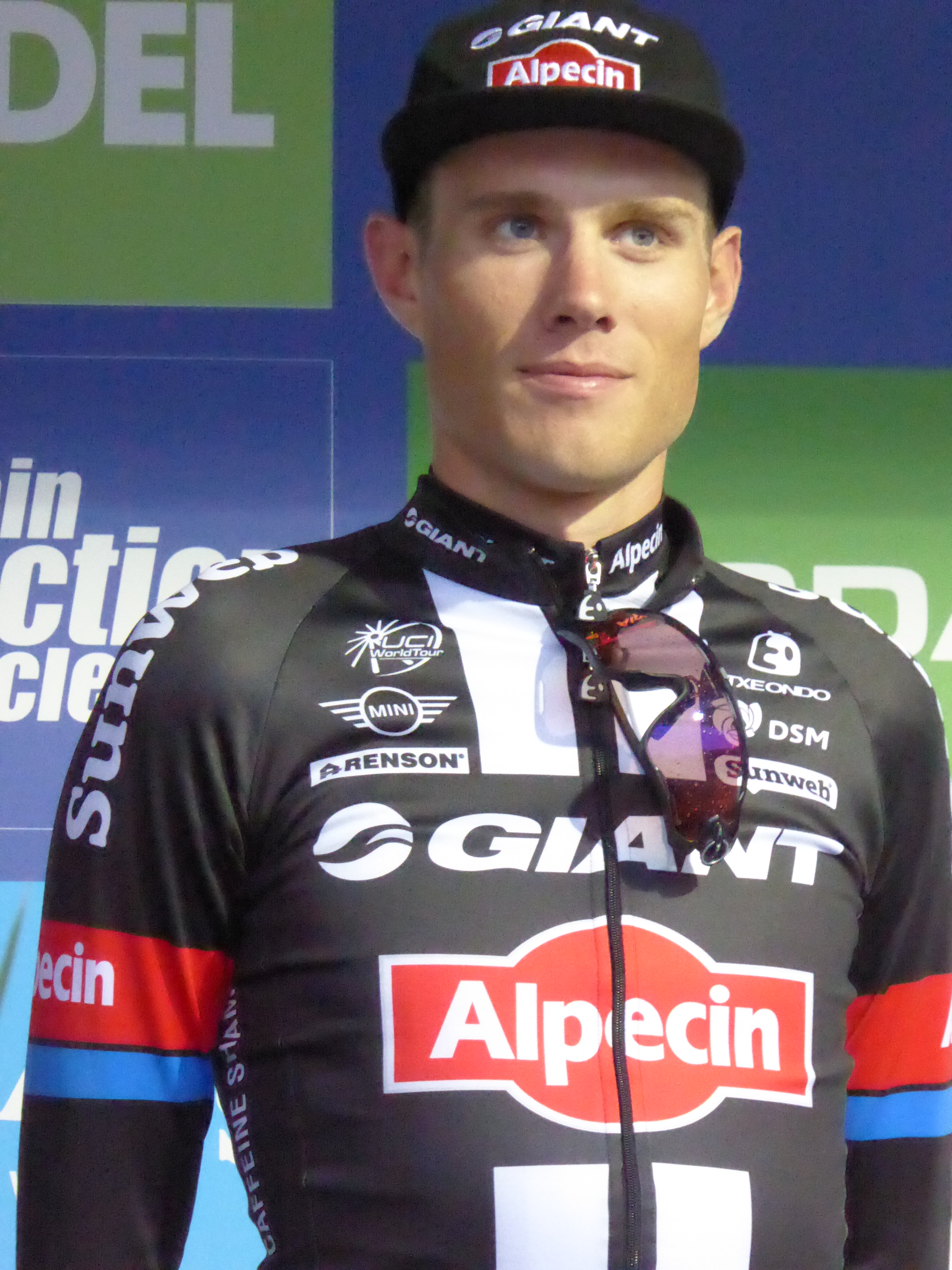
- Hoekstra at the 2016 Tour of Britain.

Personal information
- Full name: Jochem Hoekstra
- Born: 21 October 1992 (age 33) Haren, Groningen, Netherlands

Cycling career
- Sport: Cycling
- Discipline: Road
- Role: Rider

Amateur teams
- 2009–2010: De Jong & Laan–Peddelaars
- 2011: SG Automatisering–WSV Emmen
- 2018–2019: NWV Groningen

Professional teams
- 2012: Cycling Team Jo Piels (stagiaire)
- 2013–2015: Cycling Team Jo Piels
- 2016: Parkhotel Valkenburg Continental Team
- 2016: Team Giant–Alpecin (stagiaire)
- 2017: Destil–Jo Piels

Jochem Hoekstra (born 21 October 1992) is a Dutch racing cyclist, who last rode for Dutch amateur team NWV Groningen. He rode at the 2013 UCI Road World Championships.

== Major results ==
2013
5th Overall Tour de Berlin
2014
1st Overall Tour de Berlin

1st Stage 2 (ITT)

2nd Grand Prix des Marbriers
5th Overall Carpathian Couriers Race

1st Stage 2

9th Overall Dookoła Mazowsza
2015
Olympia's Tour

1st Mountains classification
1st Stage 1a (TTT)

6th Overall Tour du Loir-et-Cher
7th Overall Czech Cycling Tour
2016
10th Velothon Wales
