= Arno Wallaard Memorial =

Dutch one-day road cycling race

Race details
- Date: Late-April
- Region: Alblasserwaard, Netherlands
- English name: Arno Wallaard Memorial
- Discipline: Road race
- Competition: UCI Europe Tour
- Type: Single-day
- Web site: www.arnowallaardmemorial.nl

History
- First edition: 1984
- Editions: 41 (as of 2026)
- First winner: Arie Overbeeke (NED)
- Most wins: Arie Overbeeke (NED) (2 wins)
- Most recent: Max Kroonen (NED)

Arno Wallaard Memorial is a single-day bicycle road race held annually in the Dutch region of Alblasserwaard: prior to 2007, the race was called "Omloop Alblasserwaard". Since 2009, it is organized as a 1.2 event on the UCI Europe Tour.

== Winners ==
Year	Country	Rider	Team
1984	Netherlands	Arie Overbeeke	
1985	Netherlands	Arie Overbeeke	
1986	Netherlands	Patrick Bol	
1987	Netherlands	John de Crom	
1988	Netherlands	Jos Gevers	
1989	Netherlands	Allard Engels	
1990	Netherlands	Ton Zwirs	
1991	Netherlands	Herman Woudenberg	
1992	Netherlands	Max van Heeswijk	
1993	Netherlands	Stefan van Teijlingen	
1994	Netherlands	Leon Rotteveel	
1995	Netherlands	Tommy Post	
1996	Netherlands	Niels Harms	
1997	Netherlands	Corné Castein	
1998	Netherlands	Edwin Hofstee	
1999	Netherlands	Arno Wallaard	
2000	Netherlands	Herold Dat	
2001	Netherlands	Peter van Agtmaal	
2002	Netherlands	Berry Hoedemakers	
2003	Netherlands	Rob Koole	
2004	Netherlands	Ger Soepenberg	Löwik Meubelen-Tegeltoko
2005	Netherlands	Gideon de Jong	Eurogifts.com
2006	Netherlands	Dennis van Winden	B&E Cycling Team
2007	France	Denis Flahaut	Jartazi–Promo Fashion
2008	Netherlands	Cornelius van Ooijen	Cycling Team Jo Piels
2009	Netherlands	Lieuwe Westra	Vacansoleil
2010	Netherlands	Stefan van Dijk	Verandas Willems
2011	Netherlands	Arne Hassink	TT Raiko-Argon 18
2012	Netherlands	Dylan van Baarle	Rabobank Continental Team
2013	Netherlands	Coen Vermeltfoort	Cycling Team De Rijke–Shanks
2014	Sweden	Edvin Wilson	Team Joker
2015	Netherlands	Jasper Bovenhuis	SEG Racing
2016	Netherlands	Maarten van Trijp	Metec–TKH
2017	Belgium	Timothy Stevens	Pauwels Sauzen–Vastgoedservice
2018	Germany	Joshua Huppertz	Team Lotto–Kern Haus
2019	Great Britain	Alexander Richardson	Canyon dhb p/b Bloor Homes
2020–21	No race due to the COVID-19 pandemic		
2022	Netherlands	Elmar Reinders	Riwal Cycling Team
2023	Denmark	Rasmus Bøgh Wallin	Restaurant Suri–Carl Ras
2024	Netherlands	Pete Uptegrove	Israel–Premier Tech
2025	Denmark	Stian Rosenlund	Airtox–Carl Ras
2026	Netherlands	Max Kroonen	BEAT CC p/b Saxo
