= Ster van Zwolle =

Dutch one-day road cycling race

Race details
- Date: Late-February
- Region: Zwolle, Overijssel, Netherlands
- Discipline: Road
- Competition: UCI Europe Tour
- Type: Single-day
- Web site: www.stervanzwolle.nl

History
- First edition: 8 July 1961
- Editions: 64 (as of 2026)
- First winner: Jan Rol (NED)
- Most wins: Dries Klein (NED); Coen Vermeltfoort (NED) (3 wins)
- Most recent: Mathis Avondts (BEL)

The Ster van Zwolle is a single-day bicycle road race held annually in Zwolle, in the Dutch region of Overijssel. Since 2011, it is organized as a 1.2 event on the UCI Europe Tour.

== Winners ==
Year	Country	Rider	Team
1961	Netherlands	Jan Rol	
1962	Netherlands	Jan Schröder	
1963	Netherlands	Evert Dickhof	
1964	Netherlands	Harrie Koopmans	
1965	Netherlands	Henk Steevens	
1966	Netherlands	Jan van der Horst	
1967	Netherlands	Harrie Jansen	
1968	Netherlands	Herman Hoogezaad	
1969	Netherlands	Jo Vrancken	
1970	Netherlands	Jo Vrancken	
1971	Netherlands	Juul Bruesing	
1972	Netherlands	Louis Westrus	
1973	Netherlands	Cees Priem	
1974	Netherlands	Gerrie van Gerwen	
1975	Netherlands	Frits Pirard	
1976	Netherlands	Piet Hoekstra	
1977	Netherlands	Joop Ribbers	
1978	Netherlands	Jan Spijker	
1979	Netherlands	Hans Plugers	
1980	Netherlands	Johan Kuiken	
1981	Netherlands	Dries Klein	
1982	Netherlands	Jannus Slendebroek	
1983	Netherlands	Dries Klein	
1984	Netherlands	Ron Mackay	
1985	Netherlands	Dries Klein	
1986	Netherlands	Erwin Kistemaker	
1987	Netherlands	Michel Cornelisse	
1988	Netherlands	Henk Boorsma	
1989	Netherlands	Wietse Veenstra	
1990	Netherlands	Tonnie Akkermans	
1991	Netherlands	Jans Koerts	
1992	Netherlands	Martijn Vos	
1993	Netherlands	Michel Cornelisse	
1994	Belgium	Marc Wauters	
1995	Netherlands	Niels Boogaard	
1996	Netherlands	Louis de Koning	
1997	Netherlands	Bennie Gosink	
1998	Netherlands	Renger Ypenburg	Giant–Löwik
1999	Netherlands	Rik Reinerink	Batavus-BankGiroLoterij
2000	Netherlands	Paul van Schalen	BankGiroLoterij-Batavus
2001	Netherlands	Rudie Kemna	BankGiroLoterij-Batavus
2002	Netherlands	Marco Bos	Cycling Team Tegeltoko
2003	Netherlands	Mark Vlijm	AXA Cycling Team
2004	Netherlands	Marvin van der Pluijm	Van Hemert-Eurogifts
2005	Netherlands	Peter Möhlmann	AXA Pro Cycling Team
2006	Netherlands	Marvin van der Pluijm	Ubbink-Syntec Cycling Team
2007	Netherlands	Dennis Smit	Ubbink-Syntec Cycling Team
2008	Netherlands	Germ van der Burg	Ruiter Dakkapellen
2009	Netherlands	Bram Schmitz	Van Vliet-EBH Elshof
2010	Netherlands	Bert-Jan Lindeman	Cycling Team Jo Piels
2011	Netherlands	Barry Markus	Rabobank Continental Team
2012	Netherlands	Robin Chaigneau	Koga Cycling Team
2013	Netherlands	Dylan van Baarle	Rabobank Development Team
2014	Netherlands	Bert-Jan Lindeman	Rabobank Development Team
2015	Netherlands	Elmar Reinders	Cyclingteam Jo Piels
2016	Netherlands	Jeff Vermeulen	Cyclingteam Jo Piels
2017	Netherlands	Fabio Jakobsen	SEG Racing Academy
2018	Netherlands	Maarten van Trijp	Destil–Parkhotel Valkenburg
2019	Netherlands	Coen Vermeltfoort	Alecto Cycling Team
2020	Netherlands	David Dekker	SEG Racing Academy
2021	Netherlands	Coen Vermeltfoort	VolkerWessels Cycling Team
2022	No race		
2023	Netherlands	Coen Vermeltfoort	VolkerWessels Cycling Team
2024	Denmark	Nicklas Amdi Pedersen	TDT–Unibet Cycling Team
2025	No race		
2026	Belgium	Mathis Avondts	Parkhotel Valkenburg
