= PWZ Zuidenveld Tour =

Dutch one-day road cycling race

Race details
- Date: Late April/May
- Region: Netherlands
- Discipline: Road race
- Competition: UCI Europe Tour
- Type: One-day race
- Web site: www.zuidenveldtour.nl

History
- First edition: 1992
- Editions: 31 (as of 2022)
- First winner: Jeroen Blijlevens (NED)
- Most wins: Jeff Vermeulen (NED); Marco Bos (NED); Bart Boom (NED); (2 wins)
- Most recent: Coen Vermeltfoort (NED)

The PWZ Zuidenveld Tour, formerly the Zuid Oost Drenthe Classic, is a road bicycle race held annually in the Netherlands. It has been organized as a 1.2 event on the UCI Europe Tour since 2013.

== Winners ==
Year	Winner	Second	Third
1992	(Netherlands) Jeroen Blijlevens	(Netherlands) David Veenendaal	(Netherlands) Tonnie Teuben
1993	(Netherlands) Erik van der Heide	(Netherlands) Marcel Vegt	(Netherlands) Danny Stam
1994	(Netherlands) Jan de Leeuw	(Netherlands) Lex Nederlof	(Netherlands) Ronald Withag
1995	(Netherlands) Steven de Jongh	(Netherlands) Jeroen Slagter	(Netherlands) Arjan Vinke
1996	(Netherlands) Michael van der Wolf	(Netherlands) Rudi Kemna	(Netherlands) Herold Dat
1997	(Netherlands) Sander Olijve	(Netherlands) Rudi Kemna	(Netherlands) Martin van Steen
1998	(Netherlands) Bart Boom	(Netherlands) Ronald Mutsaars	(Netherlands) Herman Fledderus
1999	(Netherlands) Mark ter Schure	(Netherlands) Andre van de Reep	(Netherlands) Bjorn Vonk
2000	(Netherlands) Bobbie Traksel	(Netherlands) Gerben van de Reep	(Netherlands) Herold Dat
2001	(Netherlands) Edwin Dunning	(Netherlands) Julien Smink	(Netherlands) Wally Buurstede
2002	(Netherlands) Angelo van Melis	(Netherlands) Marcel Luppes	(Netherlands) Arno Wallaard
2003	(Netherlands) Pascal Hermes	(Netherlands) Marcel Luppes	(Netherlands) Jos Pronk
2004	(Netherlands) Peter van Agtmaal	(Netherlands) Peter Schep	(Netherlands) Peter Olde Dubbelink
2005	(Netherlands) Bart Boom	(Netherlands) Jos Lucassen	(South Africa) Raynold Smith
2006	(Netherlands) Jos Harms	(Netherlands) Wim Stroetinga	(Netherlands) Marco Bos
2007	(Netherlands) Marco Bos	(Denmark) Marc Hester Hansen	(Netherlands) Martijn Lust
2008	(Netherlands) Marco Bos	(Netherlands) Bert-Jan Lindeman	(Netherlands) Joost Spring In't Veld
2009	(Netherlands) Marcel Beima	(Netherlands) Jasper Lenferink	(Netherlands) Martijn Verschoor
2010	(Netherlands) Peter Schulting	(Netherlands) Glenn Clermonts	(Netherlands) Bert-Jan Lindeman
2011	(Netherlands) Bert-Jan Lindeman	(Netherlands) Jos Harms	(Netherlands) Niels de Blaauw
2012	(Netherlands) Maurits Lammertink	(Belgium) Dries Hollanders	(Netherlands) Bart van Haaren
2013 (1)	(Netherlands) Jeff Vermeulen	(Belgium) Niko Eeckhout	(Germany) Grischa Janorschke
2013 (2)	(Netherlands) Brian van Goethem	(Netherlands) Johim Ariesen	(Netherlands) Sjoerd Kouwenhoven
2014	(Netherlands) Wim Stroetinga	(Germany) Phil Bauhaus	(Netherlands) Dylan Groenewegen
2015	(Netherlands) Jeff Vermeulen	(Netherlands) Wim Stroetinga	(Denmark) Nicolai Brøchner
2016	(Netherlands) Elmar Reinders	(Netherlands) Taco van der Hoorn	(Netherlands) Yoeri Havik
2017	(Netherlands) Rick Ottema	(Netherlands) Joey van Rhee	(Netherlands) Stef Krul
2018	(Netherlands) Stef Krul	(Netherlands) Maarten van Trijp	(Estonia) Aksel Nõmmela
2019	(Netherlands) Luuc Bugter	(Netherlands) Bas van der Kooij	(Belgium) Yves Coolen
2020	Cancelled		
2021	(Netherlands) Elmar Reinders	(Netherlands) Daan van Sintmaartensdijk	(Czech Republic) Richard Habermann
2022	(Netherlands) Coen Vermeltfoort	(Czech Republic) Tomáš Kopecký	(Denmark) Marcus Sander Hansen
