= Koga Cycling Team =

Dutch cycling team

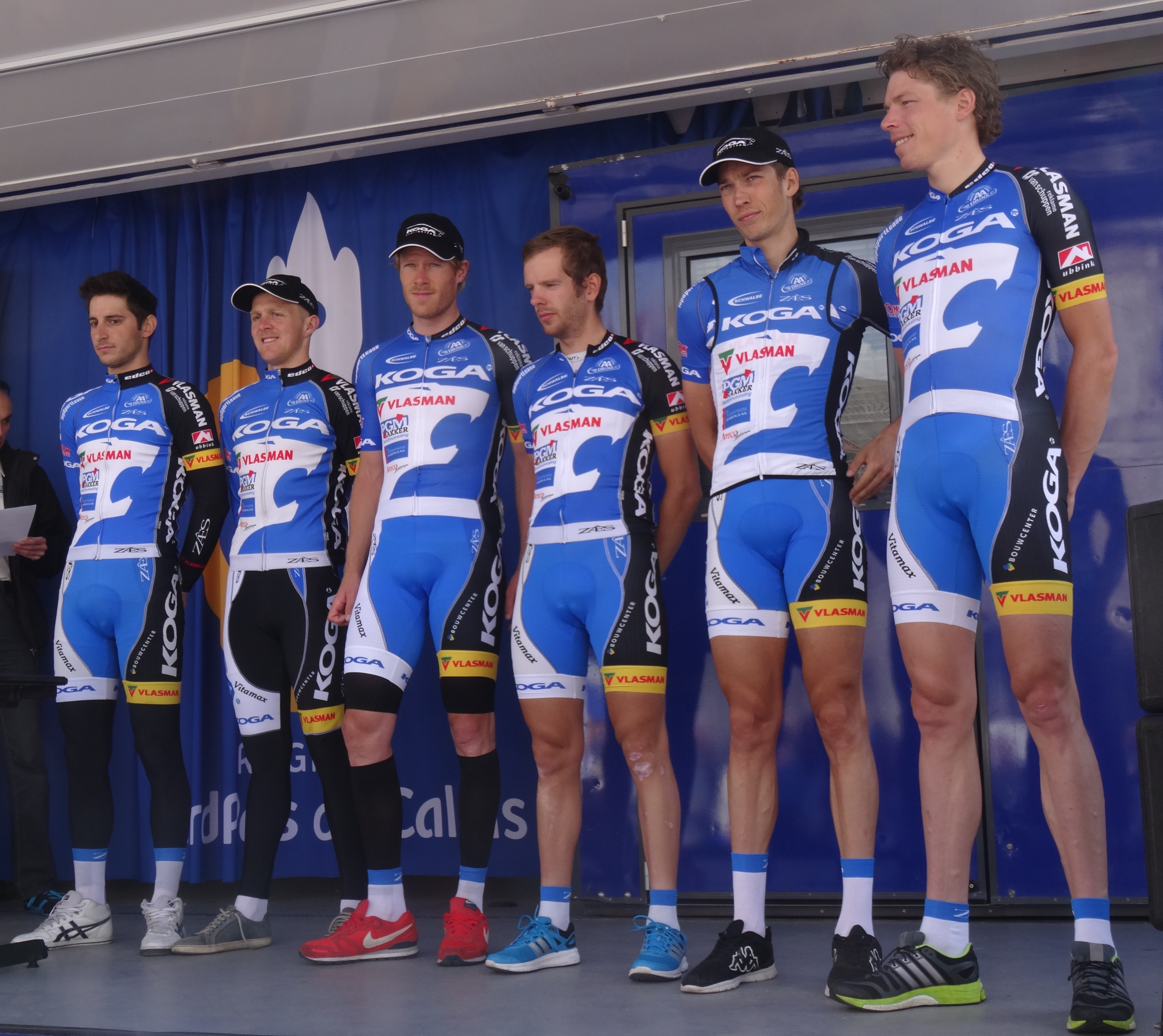
- The team in 2014

Team information
- UCI code: KOG
- Registered: Netherlands
- Founded: 1999
- Disbanded: 2014
- Discipline: Road
- Status: UCI Continental

Key personnel
- General manager: Ton Welling
- Team managers: Willy Vink; Peter Schep

Team name history
- 1999–2000 2001–2002 2003–2005 2006–2008 2009 2010 2011 2012–2014: Axa; Axa–VVZ Professional; Axa Pro Cycling Team; Ubbink–Syntec Cycling Team; Koga–CreditForce; Koga–CreditForce–Ubbink Track; Ubbink–Koga; Koga Cycling Team

The Koga Cycling Team was a Dutch UCI Continental cycling team that existed from 1999 to 2014.
