= Destil–Parkhotel Valkenburg =

Dutch cycling team

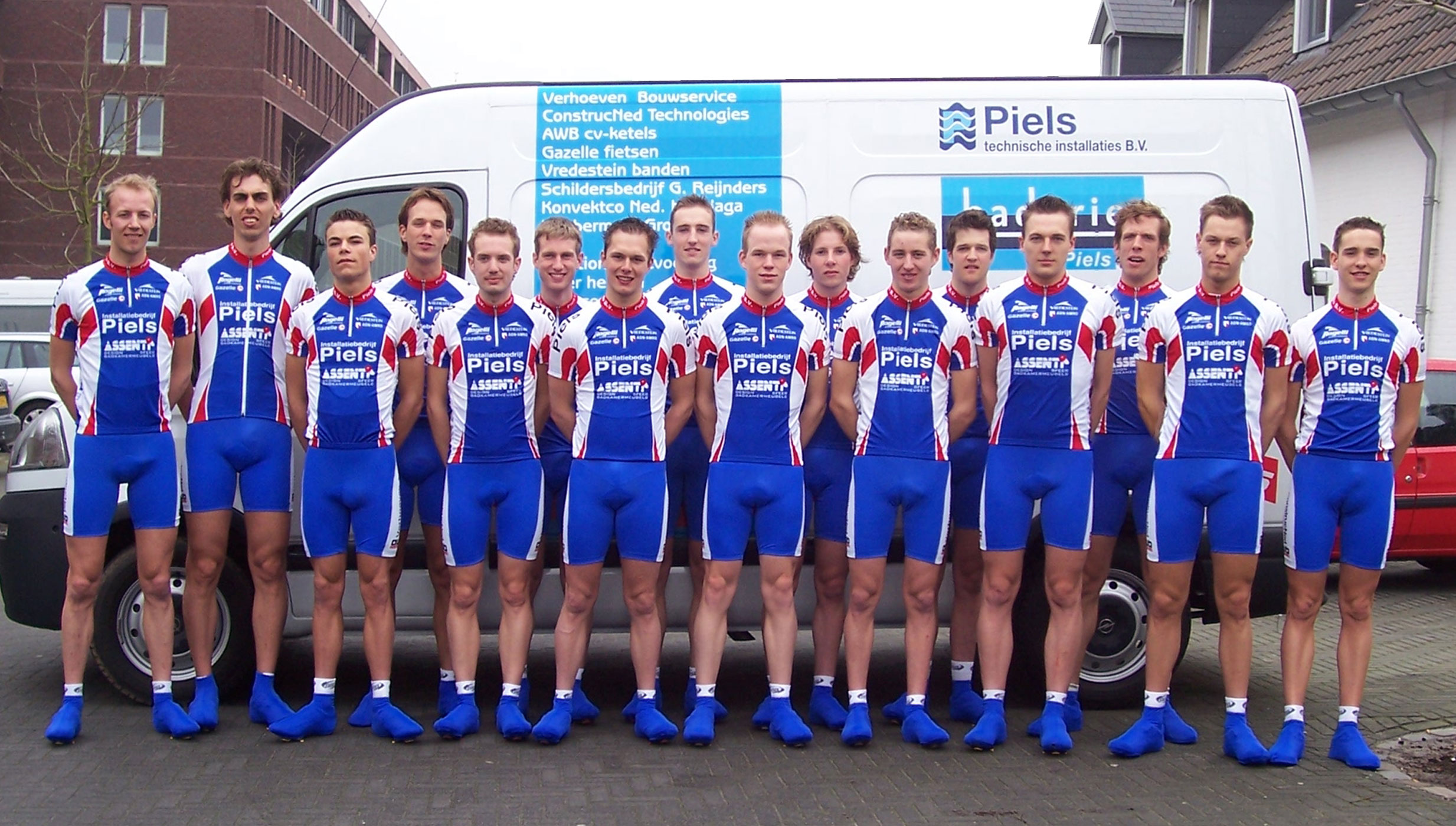

Team information
- UCI code: DPH
- Registered: Netherlands
- Founded: 2003
- Disbanded: 2018
- Discipline: Road
- Status: Division III (2003–2004); UCI Continental (2005– )

Key personnel
- Team manager: Rijk Vink (2003-2015)

Team name history
- 2003-2004 2005 2006–2016 2017 2018: Apac Cycling Team; Trientalis–Apac Team; Cycling Team Jo Piels; Destil–Jo Piels; Destil–Parkhotel Valkenburg

Destil–Parkhotel Valkenburg (UCI team code: DJP) was a continental cycling team based in the Netherlands that participated in UCI Continental Circuits races. The team was founded in 2003 by Rijk Vink under the name of Apac Cycling Team. From 2006 to 2016 it was known as Cycling Team Jo Piels.

The team was known for developing talent like Bert-Jan Lindeman and Koen Bouwman. CT Jo Piels participated in the men's team time trial at the 2013 UCI Road World Championships and qualified for the 2014 UCI Road World Championships.

After the demise of manager Vink, the team planned to merge with Parkhotel Valkenburg CT. Subsponsor of both teams Destil would step up as main sponsor of the project which would take on the best riders of both teams. But then, Parkhotel Valkenburg CT manager Paul Tabak split off from the project, took along most riders and founded his own men's team Monkey Town.

In 2017 the now weakened project under manager Steven Rooks had a men's team Destil-Jo Piels, a women's team Parkhotel Valkenburg Destil and a cyclocross team Destil ZZPR.nl. Early financial troubles lead to downsizing of the team's international agenda and a major part of the staff left, including sports director Han Vaanhold. This was a sign for sponsor Jo Piels to also leave the project.

In 2018 the men's team went on as Destil-Parkhotel Valkenburg. It was the last year with a UCI Continental Team status. In 2019 the road team merged with the off road team and went on as an under 23 team. Their name changed to ZZPR.nl-HanClean-Orange Babies under the management of Frank Groenendaal. The women's branch continued as a separate team Parkhotel Valkenburg under the foundation Wielertalent in ontwikkeling (cycling talent in development).

== Team roster ==
Rider	Date of birth
Cameron Beard (USA)	1 August 1998 (age 28)
Robin Blummel (NED)	10 January 1999 (age 27)
Twan Brusselman (NED)	15 August 1993 (age 33)
Pavel Chursin (RUS)	21 April 1995 (age 31)
Timo de Jong (NED)	28 March 1999 (age 27)
Jacob Eriksson (SWE)	1 October 1999 (age 26)
Guillem Garcia Saubi (ESP)	31 October 1999 (age 26)
Stepan Grigoryan (RUS)	27 March 1994 (age 32)

Rider	Date of birth
Tim Kerkhof (NED)	13 November 1993 (age 32)
Lars Oreel (NED)	10 August 1999 (age 27)
Maik van der Heijden (NED)	3 April 1997 (age 29)
Jordi van Loon (NED)	21 April 1996 (age 30)
Maarten van Trijp (NED)	6 October 1993 (age 32)
Oscar Van Wijk (NED)	23 September 1997 (age 28)
Camden Vodicka (USA)	21 December 1999 (age 26)

== Major wins ==
2005
Grand Prix de Beuvry-la-Forêt, Maint Berkenbosch
Overall Rhône-Alpes Isère Tour, Maint Berkenbosch
2006
Stage 3 Olympia's Tour, Marco Bos
2007
Stage 3 Tour de Berlin, Peter Schulting
Ronde van Overijssel, Marco Bos
2009
Stage 1 Tour de Berlin, Tom Relou
Stage 2 Tour de Berlin, Jelle Posthuma
2010
Overall Tour de Berlin, Marc Goos

Stage 3, Marc Goos

Stage 3 Tour de Gironde, Bert-Jan Lindeman
Overall Mainfranken-Tour, Marc Goos

Prologue, Jarno Gmelich
Stage 2, Marc Goos

Kernen Omloop Echt-Susteren, Peter Schulting
2011
Stage 3 Tour de Berlin, Jasper Hamelink
Stage 4 Czech Cycling Tour, Maurits Lammertink
2012
Overall Carpathia Couriers Path, Maurits Lammertink

Stage 1, Maurits Lammertink

Stage 3 Tour de Gironde, Geert van der Weijst
2013
Stage 4 Tour du Loir-et-Cher, Tom Vermeer
Ronde van Overijssel, Tom Vermeer
Overall Carpathian Couriers Race, Stefan Poutsma

Stage 3, Stefan Poutsma

Stage 4 Tour de Gironde, Geert van der Weijst
Stage 4 Kreiz Breizh Elites, Geert van der Weijst
2014
Stage 1 Tour du Loir-et-Cher, Geert van der Weijst
Stage 2 Carpathian Couriers Race, Jochem Hoekstra
Circuit de Wallonie, Maurits Lammertink
Overall Olympia's Tour, Berden de Vries

Stage 1, Berden de Vries
Stage 2, Team time trial

Overall Tour de Berlin, Jochem Hoekstra

Stage 1, Elmar Reinders
Stage 2 (ITT), Jochem Hoekstra

Stage 2 Tour de Gironde, Rens te Stroet
Stage 5 Tour de Gironde, Geert van der Weijst
Netherlands National U23 Time Trial Championships, Steven Lammertink
Stage 4 Czech Cycling Tour, Maurits Lammertink
Stage 5 Dookoła Mazowsza, Maurits Lammertink
2015
Ster van Zwolle, Elmar Reinders
Zuid Oost Drenthe Classic I, Jeff Vermeulen
Overall Carpathian Couriers Race, Tim Ariesen

Stage 3, Twan Brusselman

Ronde van Overijssel, Jeff Vermeulen
Stage 1a Olympia's Tour, Team time trial
Stage 4 Olympia's Tour, Jeff Vermeulen
Stage 2 Paris–Arras Tour, Jeff Vermeulen
Parel van de Veluwe, Jeff Vermeulen
Stage 2 Podlasie Tour, Stefan Poutsma
Stage 2 Dookoła Mazowsza, Stefan Poutsma
2016
Ster van Zwolle, Jeff Vermeulen
Stage 5 Tour du Loir-et-Cher, Jeff Vermeulen
ZODC Zuidenveld Tour, Elmar Reinders
Netherlands National U23 Time Trial Championships, Tim Rodenburg
Paris–Tours Espoirs, Arvid de Kleijn
2017
Netherlands National Track Championships (Individual pursuit), Dion Beukeboom
2018
Stage 5 Carpathian Couriers Race, Timo de Jong
Stage 2 Tour de Serbie, Maarten van Trijp
