= Ronde van Overijssel =

Dutch one-day road cycling race

Race details
- Date: May
- Region: Overijssel, Netherlands
- English name: Tour of Overijssel
- Local name: Ronde van Overijssel
- Discipline: Road race
- Competition: UCI Europe Tour
- Type: Single day race (except 2012); Short stage race (2012)
- Web site: www.rondevanoverijssel.nl

History
- First edition: 1952
- Editions: 71 (as of 2026)
- First winner: Piet Smit (NED)
- Most wins: Michel Stolker (NED); Herman Snoeijink (NED); Jan Spijker (NED); Coen Vermeltfoort (NED) (2 wins)
- Most recent: Patrick Eddy (AUS)

Ronde van Overijssel (English: Tour of Overijssel) is an elite men's road bicycle racing event held annually in Overijssel, Netherlands and sanctioned by the Royal Dutch Cycling Union.

The event is UCI 1.2 rated, and is part of the UCI Europe Tour. In 2012, the race was expanded to two days for its 60th anniversary, but reverted to a single-day race in 2013.

== Winners ==
Year	Country	Rider	Team
1952	Netherlands	Piet Smit	
1953	Netherlands	Michel Stolker	
1954	Netherlands	Mick Snijder	
1955	Netherlands	Michel Stolker	
1956	Netherlands	Coen Niesten	
1957	Netherlands	Piet Damen	
1958	Netherlands	Harry Scholten	
1959	Netherlands	Bas Maliepaard	
1960	Netherlands	Jan Janssen	
1961	Netherlands	Piet van der Horst	
1962	Netherlands	Henk Cornelisse	
1963	Netherlands	Leo van Dongen	
1964	Netherlands	Gerben Karstens	
1965	Netherlands	Ad van Kemenade	
1966	Netherlands	Gerard Vianen	
1967	Netherlands	Ted Blom	
1968	Netherlands	Jan Krekels	
1969	Netherlands	Bart Solaro	
1970	Netherlands	John Cornelissen	
1971	Netherlands	Charles de Smit	
1972	Netherlands	Jo van Pol	
1973	Netherlands	Jan Aling	
1974	Netherlands	Jan Lenferink	
1975	Netherlands	Wil van Helvoirt	
1976	Netherlands	Arie Hassink	
1977	Netherlands	Frits Schür	
1978	Netherlands	Herman Snoeijink	
1979	Netherlands	Ad Versluis	
1980	Netherlands	Herman Snoeijink	
1981	Netherlands	Jan Feiken	
1982	Netherlands	Jos Alberts	
1983	Netherlands	Jan Spijker	
1984	Netherlands	Jan Spijker	
1985	Netherlands	Eddy Schurer	
1986	Netherlands	Rob Harmeling	
1987	Netherlands	Tom Cordes	
1988	Netherlands	John Vos	
1989	Netherlands	Pierre Duin	
1990	Netherlands	Tristan Hoffman	
1991	Netherlands	Frank van Veenendaal	
1992	Netherlands	Tonnie Teuben	
1993	Netherlands	Martin van Steen	
1994	Netherlands	Bennie Gosink	
1995	Netherlands	Louis de Koning	
1996	Netherlands	Anthony Theus	
1997	Netherlands	Rudie Kemna	
1998	Denmark	Tayeb Braikia	
1999	Netherlands	Wim van de Meulenhof	
2000	Netherlands	Bart Boom	
2001	No race due to foot-and-mouth outbreak		
2002	Australia	Brett Lancaster	
2003	Netherlands	Alain van Katwijk	
2004	Netherlands	Jens Mouris	Axa Cycling Team
2005	Netherlands	Arno Wallaard	
2006	Netherlands	Peter Möhlman	
2007	Netherlands	Marco Bos	
2008	Netherlands	Robin Chaigneau	Asito Cycling Team
2009	Netherlands	Kenny van Hummel	Skil–Shimano
2010	Netherlands	Job Vissers	
2011	Netherlands	Wouter Haan	
2012	South Africa	Reinardt Janse van Rensburg	MTN–Qhubeka
2013	Netherlands	Tom Vermeer	Cycling Team Jo Piels
2014	Belgium	Dennis Coenen	Leopard Development Team
2015	Netherlands	Jeff Vermeulen	Cyclingteam Jo Piels
2016	Lithuania	Aidis Kruopis	Verandas Willems
2017	Denmark	Nicolai Brøchner	Riwal Platform
2018	Netherlands	Piotr Havik	BEAT Cycling Club
2019	Netherlands	Nils Eekhoff	Development Team Sunweb
2020-2021	No race due to Covid-19 pandemic		
2022	Netherlands	Coen Vermeltfoort	VolkerWessels Cycling Team
2023	Netherlands	Coen Vermeltfoort	VolkerWessels Cycling Team
2024	Australia	Declan Trezise	ARA Skip Capital
2025	No race		
2026	Australia	Patrick Eddy	Team Brennan
