= Dorpenomloop Rucphen =

Dutch one-day road cycling race

Race details
- Date: March
- Region: Rucphen, Netherlands
- Discipline: Road
- Type: One day race
- Web site: www.dorpenomlooprucphen.nl

History
- First edition: 1974
- Editions: 50 (as of 2026)
- First winner: Ronald van der Tang (NED)
- Most recent: Timothy Dupont (BEL)

Dorpenomloop Rucphen is a men's one-day cycle race which takes place in the Netherlands and was rated by the UCI as 1.2. It forms part of the UCI Europe Tour.

== Winners ==
Year	Country	Rider	Team
1999	Netherlands	Ronald van der Tang	
2000	Netherlands	Wilco Zuijderwijk	
2001	Netherlands	Jan Schilder	MGI Fietsen
2002	Netherlands	Martin Van Steen	Van Hemert Groep Cycling
2003	Netherlands	François Franse	
2004	No race		
2005	Netherlands	Fulco Van Gulik	Cycling Team Bert Story–Piels
2006	Netherlands	Peter Woestenberg	Cyclingteam Jo Piels
2007	Netherlands	Reinier Honig	P3 Transfer–Fondas Team
2008	Netherlands	Arne Hassink	Cyclingteam Jo Piels
2009	Sweden	Johan Landström	Sweden national team
2010	No race		
2011	Netherlands	Barry Markus	Rabobank Continental Team
2012	Italy	Giorgio Brambilla	Leopard–Trek Continental Team
2013	Netherlands	Dylan van Baarle	Rabobank Development Team
2014	Denmark	Michael Carbel	Cult Energy–Vital Water
2015	Netherlands	Floris Gerts	BMC Development Team
2016	Lithuania	Aidis Kruopis	Verandas Willems
2017	Netherlands	Maarten van Trijp	Metec–TKH
2018	Denmark	Mikkel Bjerg	Hagens Berman Axeon
2019	No race due to stormy weather conditions		
2020	Netherlands	David Dekker	SEG Racing Academy
2021	Belgium	Elias Van Breussegem	Tarteletto–Isorex
2022	Netherlands	Maikel Zijlaard	VolkerWessels Cycling Team
2023	Belgium	Laurenz Rex	Circus–ReUz–Technord
2024	Netherlands	Johan Dorussen	Development Team DSM–Firmenich PostNL
2025	Belgium	Milan De Ceuster	Aviludo–Louletano–Loulé
2026	Belgium	Timothy Dupont	Tarteletto–Isorex
