= Kernen Omloop Echt-Susteren =

Dutch one-day road cycling race

Race details
- Date: September
- Discipline: Road
- Competition: UCI Europe Tour
- Type: One day race

History
- First edition: 2008
- Editions: 10
- Final edition: 2017
- First winner: Rik Kavsek (NED)
- Most wins: No repeat winners
- Final winner: Robbert de Greef (NED)

The Kernen Omloop Echt-Susteren was a one-day cycling race that was held annually in the Netherlands from 2008 to 2017. It was rated a category 1.2 event on the UCI Europe Tour.

== Winners ==
Year	Country	Rider	Team
2008	Netherlands	Rik Kavsek	KrolStonE Continental Team
2009	Netherlands	Jeff Vermeulen	AA Cycling Team
2010	Netherlands	Peter Schulting	Cycling Team Jo Piels
2011	Latvia	Andris Smirnovs	Latvia (national team)
2012	Norway	Daniel Hoelgaard	Team Øster Hus–Ridley
2013	Netherlands	Dylan Groenewegen	Cycling Team De Rijke–Shanks
2014	Germany	Phil Bauhaus	Team Stölting
2015	Germany	Max Walscheid	Team Giant–Alpecin
2016	Netherlands	Daan Meijers	Cyclingteam Join-S–De Rijke
2017	Netherlands	Robbert de Greef	Baby-Dump Cyclingteam
