= List of 2014 UCI Professional Continental and Continental teams =

Listed below are the UCI Professional Continental and Continental Teams that compete in road bicycle racing events of the UCI Continental Circuits organised by the International Cycling Union (UCI). The UCI Continental Circuits are divided in 5 continental zones, America, Europe, Asia, Africa and Oceania.

All lists updated as of 1 February 2014.

== UCI Professional Continental Teams ==
According to the UCI Rulebook, "a professional continental team is an organisation created to take part in road events open to professional continental teams. It is known by a unique name and registered with the UCI in accordance with the provisions below.

- The professional continental team comprises all the riders registered with the UCI as members of the team, the paying agent, the sponsors and all other persons contracted by the paying agent and/or the sponsors to provide for the continuing operation of the team (manager, team manager, coach, paramedical assistant, mechanic, etc.).
- Each professional continental team must employ at least 14 riders, 2 team managers and 3 other staff (paramedical assistants, mechanics, etc.) on a full time basis for the whole registration year."

=== List of 2014 UCI Africa Tour professional teams ===
Code	Official Team Name	Country
MTN	MTN–Qhubeka	South Africa

=== List of 2014 UCI America Tour professional teams ===
Code	Official Team Name	Country
COL	Colombia	Colombia
TNN	Team Novo Nordisk	United States
UHC	UnitedHealthcare	United States

=== List of 2014 UCI Asia Tour professional teams ===
Code	Official Team Name	Country
No registered teams

=== List of 2014 UCI Europe Tour professional teams ===
Code	Official Team Name	Country
TSV	Topsport Vlaanderen–Baloise	Belgium
WGG	Wanty–Groupe Gobert	Belgium
CJR	Caja Rural–Seguros RGA	Spain
BSE	Bretagne–Séché Environnement	France
COF	Cofidis	France
TNE	NetApp–Endura	Germany
AND	Androni Giocattoli–Venezuela	Italy
BAR	Bardiani–CSF	Italy
NRI	Neri Sottoli	Italy
CCC	CCC–Polsat–Polkowice	Poland
RVL	RusVelo	Russia
IAM	IAM Cycling	Switzerland

=== List of 2014 UCI Oceania Tour professional teams ===
Code	Official Team Name	Country
DPC	Drapac Professional Cycling	Australia

== UCI Continental Teams ==
According to the UCI Rulebook, "a UCI continental team is a team of road riders recognised and licensed to take part in events on the continental calendars by the national federation of the nationality of the majority of its riders and registered with the UCI. The precise structure (legal and financial status, registration, guarantees, standard contract, etc.) of these teams shall be determined by the regulations of the national federation."

Riders may be professional or amateur. The nation under which the team is registered is the nation under which the majority of its riders are registered, a rule which the men's continental teams share with the UCI women's teams.

=== List of 2014 UCI Africa Tour teams ===
Code	Official Team Name	Country
GSP	Groupement Sportif Pétrolier Algérie	Algeria
OTA	Olympique Team Algérie-Tour Aglo 37	Algeria
VCS	Vélo Club Sovac	Algeria
MVA	Ville d'Alger	Algeria

=== List of 2014 UCI America Tour teams ===
Code	Official Team Name	Country
BAP	Buenos Aires Provincia	Argentina
SLS	San Luis Somos Todos	Argentina
DAT	Clube DataRo de Ciclismo-Bottecchia	Brazil
FUN	Funvic Brasilinvest–São José dos Campos	Brazil
IRC	Ironage-Colner	Brazil
MEM	Memorial-Prefeitura de Santos	Brazil
GQC	Garneau–Québecor	Canada
HRB	H&R Block Pro Cycling	Canada
SPC	Silber Pro Cycling Team	Canada
CO4	4-72 Colombia	Colombia
ECU	Team Ecuador	Ecuador
STF	Start–Trigon Cycling Team	Paraguay
IPC	InCycle-Predator Components Cycling Team	Puerto Rico
5HR	5-hour Energy	United States
AIR	Airgas–Safeway	United States
ACT	Astellas	United States
BDT	Bissell Development Team	United States
CSN	Champion System-Stan's NoTubes	United States
HSD	Hincapie Sportswear Development Team	United States
JSH	Jamis–Hagens Berman	United States
JBC	Jelly Belly–Maxxis	United States
OPM	Optum–Kelly Benefit Strategies	United States
SSC	Team SmartStop	United States

=== List of 2014 UCI Asia Tour teams ===
Code	Official Team Name	Country
CCN	CCN	Brunei
SLY	China 361° Cycling Team	China
YDL	China Hainan HNB Yindongli	China
HSN	Team Lvshan Landscape	China
CWJ	China Wuxi Jilun Cycling Team	China
GTC	Gan Su Sports Lottery Cycling Team	China
MSS	Giant–Champion System	China
HEN	Hengxiang Cycling Team	China
HBR	Holy Brother Cycling Team	China
MCT	Malak Cycling Team	China
NTC	Ningxia Sports Lottery Cycling Team	China
TYD	Qinghai Tianyoude Cycling Team	China
HKS	HKSI Pro Cycling Team	Hong Kong
AYA	Ayandeh Continental Team	Iran
PKY	Pishgaman Yazd	Iran
TPT	Tabriz Petrochemical Team	Iran
TSR	Tabriz Shahrdari Ranking	Iran
AIS	Aisan Racing Team	Japan
BGT	Bridgestone–Anchor	Japan
CPR	C Project	Japan
CRV	Ciervo Nara Merida Cycling Team	Japan
MTR	Matrix Powertag	Japan
SMN	Shimano Racing Team	Japan
UKO	Team Ukyo	Japan
BLZ	Utsunomiya Blitzen	Japan
VFN	Vini Fantini–Nippo	Japan
AS2	Continental Team Astana	Kazakhstan
V4E	Vino 4ever	Kazakhstan
GIC	Geumsan Insam Cello	South Korea
KCT	Korail Cycling Team	South Korea
KSP	KSPO	South Korea
SCT	Seoul Cycling Team	South Korea
TSG	Terengganu Cycling Team	Malaysia
LBC	LBC-MVP Sports Foundation Cycling Team	Philippines
T7E	Team 7 Eleven Road Bike Philippines	Philippines
TSI	OCBC Singapore Continental Cycling Team	Singapore
IAC	Singha Infinite Cycling Team	Thailand
RTS	RTS–Santic Racing Team	Taiwan
TGT	Team Gusto	Taiwan
SKD	Skydive Dubai Pro Cycling	United Arab Emirates

=== List of 2014 UCI Europe Tour teams ===
Code	Official Team Name	Country
AMP	Amplatz–BMC	Austria
GWO	Gebrüder Weiss–Oberndorfer	Austria
RSW	Gourmetfein–Simplon Wels	Austria
VBG	Team Vorarlberg	Austria
TIR	Tirol Cycling Team	Austria
WSA	WSA-Greenlife	Austria
BCP	Synergy Baku	Azerbaijan
BKP	BKCP–Powerplus	Belgium
CIB	Cibel	Belgium
CCB	Color Code–Biowanze	Belgium
JTW	Josan-To Win Cycling Team	Belgium
KWS	Corendon–Kwadro	Belgium
SUN	Sunweb–Napoleon Games	Belgium
PCW	T.Palm–Pôle Continental Wallon	Belgium
MMM	Team3M	Belgium
TFC	Telenet–Fidea	Belgium
VGS	Vastgoedservice–Golden Palace	Belgium
VER	Veranclassic–Doltcini	Belgium
WIL	Verandas Willems	Belgium
WBC	Wallonie-Bruxelles	Belgium
SHE	Sicot-Hemus 1896	Bulgaria
KMP	Keith Mobel-Partisan	Croatia
MKT	Meridiana–Kamen	Croatia
ASP	AC Sparta Praha	Czech Republic
ADP	ASC Dukla Praha	Czech Republic
BAU	Bauknecht–Author	Czech Republic
ETI	Etixx	Czech Republic
EXP	Experiment 23	Czech Republic
SKC	SKC TUFO Prostějov	Czech Republic
CWO	Christina Watches–Dana	Denmark
CUL	Cult Energy–Vital Water	Denmark
VPC	Riwal Cycling Team	Denmark
DKK	Designa Køkken-Knudsgaard	Denmark
TTF	Team TreFor–Blue Water	Denmark
BUR	Burgos BH	Spain
ORB	Euskadi	Spain
BIG	BigMat–Auber 93	France
RLM	Roubaix–Lille Métropole	France
LPM	Team La Pomme Marseille 13	France
MGT	Madison Genesis	United Kingdom
NPC	NFTO	United Kingdom
RCJ	Rapha Condor–JLT	United Kingdom
RAL	Team Raleigh	United Kingdom
VGR	Velosure–Giordana	United Kingdom
BAI	Bike Aid–Ride for Help	Germany
LKT	LKT Team Brandenburg	Germany
TBJ	MLP Team Bergstrasse	Germany
RNR	Rad-Net Rose Team	Germany
THF	Team Heizomat	Germany
TKG	Team Kuota	Germany
STG	Team Stölting	Germany
SGT	Team Stuttgart	Germany
TKT	Kastro Team	Greece
SPT	SP Tableware	Greece
UNA	Utensilnord	Hungary
SKT	An Post–Chain Reaction	Ireland
AZT	Area Zero Pro Team	Italy
MAE	Marchiol-Emisfero	Italy
MGK	Vega–Hotsand	Italy
IDE	Team Idea	Italy
VHS	Vega-Hotsand	Italy
ALB	Alpha Baltic–Unitymarathons.com	Latvia
RBD	Rietumu–Delfin	Latvia
LET	Leopard Development Team	Luxembourg
CCD	Differdange–Losch	Luxembourg
RIJ	Cyclingteam de Rijke	Netherlands
CJP	Cycling Team Jo Piels	Netherlands
KOG	Koga Cycling Team	Netherlands
MET	Metec–TKH	Netherlands
PVC	Parkhotel Valkenburg Continental Team	Netherlands
RDT	Rabobank Development Team	Netherlands
FRB	Frøy-Bianchi	Norway
MPC	Motiv3 Pro Cycling Team	Norway
FIX	Team FixIT.no	Norway
TJO	Team Joker	Norway
OHR	Team Øster Hus–Ridley	Norway
KRA	Team Ringeriks–Kraft	Norway
TSS	Team Sparebanken Sør	Norway
AJT	ActiveJet Team	Poland
BDC	BDC Marcpol	Poland
MEX	Mexller	Poland
WIB	Wibatech Fuji Zory	Poland
WTG	Weltour-Guerciotti	Poland
PRT	Banco BIC–Carmim	Portugal
EFG	Efapel–Glassdrive	Portugal
LAR	LA Alumínios–Antarte	Portugal
LDD	Louletano–Dunas Douradas	Portugal
OFM	OFM–Quinta da Lixa	Portugal
BOA	Rádio Popular	Portugal
TCT	Tuşnad Cycling Team	Romania
TIK	Itera–Katusha	Russia
LOK	Lokosphinx	Russia
HCL	Russian Helicopters	Russia
T21	Team 21	Russia
ADR	Adria Mobil	Slovenia
RAR	Radenska	Slovenia
KMP	Keith Mobel-Partizan	Serbia
CKB	CK Banská Bystrica	Slovakia
DUK	Dukla Trenčín–Trek	Slovakia
JAN	EPIC Janom Greenway	Slovakia
GID	Development Team Giant–Shimano	Sweden
FFU	Firefighters Upsala CK	Sweden
TKS	Torku Şekerspor	Turkey
AMO	Amore & Vita–Selle SMP	Ukraine
ISD	ISD Continental Team	Ukraine
KLS	Kolss Cycling Team	Ukraine

=== List of 2014 UCI Oceania Tour teams ===
Code	Official Team Name	Country
AWS	African Wildlife Safaris Cycling Team	Australia
APC	Avanti Racing Team	Australia
BFL	Team Budget Forklifts	Australia

== Rankings ==
For more detailed explanations of the new-for-2015 points system and detail rankings see: 2015 UCI men's road cycling rankings

Preceded by 2013	List of UCI Professional Continental and Continental teams 2014	Succeeded by 2015
