= List of 2013 UCI Professional Continental and Continental teams =

Listed below are the UCI Professional Continental and Continental Teams that compete in road bicycle racing events of the UCI Continental Circuits organised by the International Cycling Union (UCI). The UCI Continental Circuits are divided into 5 continental zones, America, Europe, Asia, Africa and Oceania.

All lists are updated as of 2 February 2013.

== UCI Professional Continental Teams ==
According to the UCI Rulebook, "a professional continental team is an organisation created to take part in road events open to professional continental teams. It is known by a unique name and registered with the UCI in accordance with the provisions below.

- The professional continental team comprises all the riders registered with the UCI as members of the team, the paying agent, the sponsors and all other persons contracted by the paying agent and/or the sponsors to provide for the continuing operation of the team (manager, team manager, coach, paramedical assistant, mechanic, etc.).
- Each professional continental team must employ at least 14 riders, 2 team managers and 3 other staff (paramedical assistants, mechanics, etc.) on a full time basis for the whole registration year."

=== List of 2013 UCI Africa Tour professional teams ===
Code	Official Team Name	Country
MTN	MTN–Qhubeka	South Africa

=== List of 2013 UCI America Tour professional teams ===
Code	Official Team Name	Country
COL	Colombia	Colombia
TNN	Team Novo Nordisk	United States
UHC	UnitedHealthcare	United States

=== List of 2013 UCI Asia Tour professional teams ===
Code	Official Team Name	Country
CSS	Champion System	China

=== List of 2013 UCI Europe Tour professional teams ===
Code	Official Team Name	Country
AJW	Accent Jobs–Wanty	Belgium
LAN	Crelan–Euphony	Belgium
TSV	Topsport Vlaanderen–Baloise	Belgium
CJR	Caja Rural–Seguros RGA	Spain
BSC	Bretagne–Séché Environnement	France
COF	Cofidis	France
SAU	Sojasun	France
EUC	Team Europcar	France
APP	NetApp–Endura	Germany
AND	Androni Giocattoli–Venezuela	Italy
COG	Bardiani Valvole–CSF Inox	Italy
FAR	Vini Fantini–Selle Italia	Italy
CCC	CCC–Polsat–Polkowice	Poland
RVL	RusVelo	Russia
IAM	IAM Cycling	Switzerland

=== List of 2013 UCI Oceania Tour professional teams ===
Code	Official Team Name	Country
	No team registered	

== UCI Continental Teams ==
According to the UCI Rulebook, "a UCI continental team is a team of road riders recognised and licensed to take part in events on the continental calendars by the national federation of the nationality of the majority of its riders and registered with the UCI. The precise structure (legal and financial status, registration, guarantees, standard contract, etc.) of these teams shall be determined by the regulations of the national federation."

Riders may be professional or amateur. The nation under which the team is registered is the nation under which the majority of its riders are registered, a rule which the men's continental teams share with the UCI women's teams.

=== List of 2013 UCI Africa Tour teams ===
Code	Official Team Name	Country
GSP	Groupement Sportif Pétrolier Algérie	Algeria
MVA	Miche-Ville d'Alger	Algeria
OTA	Olympique Team Algérie	Algeria
VCS	Vélo Club SOVAC	Algeria

=== List of 2013 UCI America Tour teams ===
Code	Official Team Name	Country
BAP	Buenos Aires Provincia	Argentina
SLS	San Luis Somos Todos	Argentina
DAT	Clube DataRo de Ciclismo	Brazil
FUN	Funvic Brasilinvest–São José dos Campos	Brazil
EKD	Equipe Cycliste Ekoï-Devinci	Canada
GQC	Equipe Garneau-Québecor	Canada
CPT	Clos de Pirque-Trek	Chile
CO4	4-72 Colombia	Colombia
COD	Colombia–Coldeportes	Colombia
EPM	EPM–UNE	Colombia
STF	Start–Trigon Cycling Team	Paraguay
5HR	5-hour Energy	United States
BPC	Bissell	United States
BLS	Bontrager Cycling Team	United States
HSD	Hincapie Sportswear Development Team	United States
JSH	Jamis–Hagens Berman	United States
JBC	Jelly Belly–Kenda	United States
OPT	Optum–Kelly Benefit Strategies	United States
TMK	Team Smartshop-Mountain Khakis	United States

=== List of 2013 UCI Asia Tour teams ===
Code	Official Team Name	Country
BCP	Synergy Baku	Azerbaijan
CCN	CCN	Brunei
SLY	China 361° Cycling Team	China
YDL	China Hainan Yindongli	China
JLC	China Wuxi Jilun Cycling Team	China
GTC	Gan Su Sports Lottery Cycling Team	China
HEN	Hengxiang Cycling Team	China
HBR	Holy Brother Cycling Team	China
MCT	Malak Cycling Team	China
MSS	Max Success Sports	China
TYD	Qinghai Tianyoude Cycling Team	China
AYA	Ayandeh Continental Team	Iran
IUA	Azad University Giant Team	Iran
TPT	Tabriz Petrochemical Team	Iran
AS2	Continental Team Astana	Kazakhstan
AIS	Aisan Racing Team	Japan
BGT	Bridgestone–Anchor	Japan
CPR	C Project	Japan
CRV	Ciervo Nara Cycling Team	Japan
SMN	Shimano Racing Team	Japan
PPO	Team Nippo–De Rosa	Japan
UKO	Team Ukyo	Japan
BLZ	Utsunomiya Blitzen	Japan
GGC	Geumsan Insam Cello	South Korea
KSP	KSPO	South Korea
SCT	Seoul Cycling Team	South Korea
TSG	Terengganu Cycling Team	Malaysia
LBC	LBC-MVPSF Cycling	Philippines
T7E	7 Eleven Presented by Road Bike Philippines	Philippines
TSI	OCBC Singapore Continental Cycling Team	Singapore
RTS	RTS–Santic Racing Team	Taiwan
TSM	Team Senter–Merida	Taiwan
VLR	Team Vélo Reality	Uzbekistan

=== List of 2013 UCI Europe Tour teams ===
Code	Official Team Name	Country
KTM	Arbö–Gebrüder Weiss–Oberndorfer	Austria
GMS	Gourmetfein–Simplon	Austria
VBG	Team Vorarlberg	Austria
TIR	Tirol Cycling Team	Austria
WSA	WSA	Austria
SKT	An Post–Chain Reaction	Belgium
BKP	BKCP–Powerplus	Belgium
CMD	Colba–Superano Ham	Belgium
CCB	Color Code–Biowanze	Belgium
DOL	Doltcini-Flanders	Belgium
SUN	Sunweb–Napoleon Games	Belgium
PCW	T.Palm-Pôle Continental Wallon	Belgium
MMM	Team3M	Belgium
FID	Telenet–Fidea	Belgium
TJW	To Win-Josan Cycling Team	Belgium
JVC	Ventilair–Steria Cycling Team	Belgium
WIL	Verandas Willems	Belgium
WBC	Wallonie-Bruxelles	Belgium
MKT	Meridiana–Kamen	Croatia
ASP	AC Sparta Praha	Czech Republic
ADP	ASC Dukla Praha	Czech Republic
BAU	Bauknecht–Author	Czech Republic
ETI	Etixx–IHNed	Czech Republic
EXP	Experiment 23	Czech Republic
SKC	SKC TUFO Prostějov	Czech Republic
BWC	Blue Water Cycling	Denmark
CWO	Christina Watches–Onfone	Denmark
VPC	Concordia Forsikring–Riwal	Denmark
DKK	Team Designa Køkken–Knudsgaard	Denmark
JJR	J.Jensen-Ramirent	Denmark
GLU	Team Cult Energy	Denmark
TTF	Team TreFor	Denmark
BUR	Burgos BH–Castilla y Leon	Spain
ORB	Euskadi	Spain
AUB	BigMat–Auber 93	France
LPM	La Pomme Marseille	France
RLM	Roubaix–Lille Métropole	France
MGT	Madison Genesis	United Kingdom
NGR	Node 4–Giordana Racing	United Kingdom
RCS	Rapha Condor–JLT	United Kingdom
IGS	Team IG–Sigma Sport	United Kingdom
RAL	Team Raleigh	United Kingdom
UKY	Team UK Youth	United Kingdom
LKT	LKT Team Brandenburg	Germany
TSP	Nutrixxion–Abus	Germany
RNR	Rad-Net Rose Team	Germany
TBJ	Team Bergstrasse Jenatec	Germany
THF	Team Heizomat	Germany
NSP	Team NSP–Ghost	Germany
TRS	Quantec–Indeland	Germany
STG	Team Stölting	Germany
TET	Thüringer Energie Team	Germany
WOB	Etcetera-Worldofbike	Greece
TKT	Kastro Team	Greece
SPT	SP Tableware	Greece
UNA	Utensilnord Ora24.eu	Hungary
PSN	Polygon Sweet Nice	Ireland
CEF	Ceramica Flaminia–Fondriest	Italy
ALB	Alpha Baltic–Unitymarathons.com	Latvia
RBD	Rietumu–Delfin	Latvia
LET	Leopard–Trek Continental Team	Luxembourg
CCD	Differdange–Losch	Luxembourg
RIJ	Cycling Team De Rijke–Shanks	Netherlands
CJP	Cycling Team Jo Piels	Netherlands
KOG	Koga Cycling Team	Netherlands
RB3	Rabobank Development Team	Netherlands
MET	Metec–TKH	Netherlands
FRB	Frøy-Bianchi	Norway
TJM	Joker–Merida	Norway
OCM	Oneco-Trek Cycling Team	Norway
KRA	Team Ringeriks–Kraft Look	Norway
OHR	Team Øster Hus–Ridley	Norway
TBP	Team Plussbank	Norway
BGZ	Bank BGŻ	Poland
BDC	BDC–Marcpol Team	Poland
LAS	Las Vegas Power Energy Drink	Poland
CLG	TC Chrobry Lasocky Głogów	Poland
WIB	Team Wibatech–Brzeg	Poland
PRT	Banco BIC–Carmim	Portugal
EFG	Efapel–Glassdrive	Portugal
LAR	LA Alumínios–Antarte	Portugal
LDD	Louletano–Dunas Douradas	Portugal
OFM	OFM–Quinta da Lixa	Portugal
BOA	Rádio Popular–Onda	Portugal
TCT	Tuşnad Cycling Team	Romania
HCL	Russian Helicopters	Russia
TIK	Itera–Katusha	Russia
LOK	Lokosphinx	Russia
ADR	Adria Mobil	Slovenia
RAR	Radenska	Slovenia
SAK	Sava	Slovenia
ARH	Atlas Personal–Jakroo	Switzerland
DUK	Dukla Trenčín–Trek	Slovakia
PPY	Team People4You-UNAAS Cycling	Sweden
TKS	Torku Şekerspor	Turkey
AMO	Amore & Vita	Ukraine
ISD	ISD Continental Team	Ukraine
KLS	Kolss Cycling Team	Ukraine

=== List of 2013 UCI Oceania Tour teams ===
Code	Official Team Name	Country
DPC	Drapac Cycling	Australia
HGP	Huon Salmon–Genesys Wealth Advisers	Australia
BFL	Team Budget-Forklifts	Australia

Preceded by 2012	List of UCI Professional Continental and Continental teams 2013	Succeeded by 2014
