= List of 2012 UCI Professional Continental and Continental teams =

Listed below are the UCI Professional Continental and Continental Teams that compete in road bicycle racing events of the UCI Continental Circuits organised by the International Cycling Union (UCI). The UCI Continental Circuits are divided in 5 continental zones, America, Europe, Asia, Africa and Oceania.

== UCI Professional Continental Teams ==
According to the UCI Rulebook, "a professional continental team is an organisation created to take part in road events open to professional continental teams. It is known by a unique name and registered with the UCI in accordance with the provisions below.

- The professional continental team comprises all the riders registered with the UCI as members of the team, the paying agent, the sponsors and all other persons contracted by the paying agent and/or the sponsors to provide for the continuing operation of the team (manager, team manager, coach, paramedical assistant, mechanic, etc.).
- Each professional continental team must employ at least 14 riders, 2 team managers and 3 other staff (paramedical assistants, mechanics, etc.) on a full time basis for the whole registration year."

=== List of 2012 UCI Africa Tour professional teams ===
Code	Official Team Name	Country	Website
	No team registered		

=== List of 2012 UCI America Tour professional teams ===
Code	Official Team Name	Country
CSM	SpiderTech–C10	Canada
COL	Colombia–Coldeportes	Colombia
TT1	Team Type 1–Sanofi	United States
UHC	UnitedHealthcare	United States

=== List of 2012 UCI Asia Tour professional teams ===
Code	Official Team Name	Country
CHA	Champion System	China

=== List of 2012 UCI Europe Tour professional teams ===
Code	Official Team Name	Country
LAN	Landbouwkrediet–Colnago	Belgium
TSV	Team Flanders–Baloise	Belgium
VWA	Accent.jobs–Willems Veranda's	Belgium
ACG	Andalucía	Spain
CJR	Caja Rural	Spain
BSC	Bretagne–Schuller	France
COF	Cofidis	France
SAU	Saur–Sojasun	France
EUC	Team TotalEnergies	France
FAR	Vini Zabù	United Kingdom
APP	Team NetApp	Germany
COG	Colnago–CSF Bardiani	Ireland
UNA	Utensilnord–Named	Ireland
ASA	Acqua & Sapone	Italy
AND	GW Erco SportFitness	Italy
ARG	Argos–Shimano	Netherlands
RVL	RusVelo	Russia

=== List of 2012 UCI Oceania Tour professional teams ===
Code	Official Team Name	Country
	No team registered	

== UCI Continental Teams ==
According to the UCI Rulebook, "a UCI continental team is a team of road riders recognised and licensed to take part in events on the continental calendars by the national federation of the nationality of the majority of its riders and registered with the UCI. The precise structure (legal and financial status, registration, guarantees, standard contract, etc.) of these teams shall be determined by the regulations of the national federation."

Riders may be professional or amateur. The nation under which the team is registered is the nation under which the majority of its riders are registered, a rule which the men's continental teams share with the UCI women's teams.

=== List of 2012 UCI Africa Tour teams ===
Code	Official Team Name	Country
GVA	Geofco-Ville d'Alger	Algeria
GSP	Groupement Sportif Petrolier Algérie	Algeria
OTA	Olympique Team Algérie	Algeria
VCS	Vélo Club SOVAC-Algérie	Algeria
MPC	Marco Polo Cycling–Donckers Koffie	Ethiopia
MTN	MTN–Qhubeka	South Africa
BNT	Team Bonitas	South Africa

=== List of 2012 UCI America Tour teams ===
Code	Official Team Name	Country
SLS	San Luis Somos Todos	Argentina
DAT	Clube DataRo de Ciclismo	Brazil
FUN	Funvic–Pindamonhangaba	Brazil
RCT	Real Cycling Team	Brazil
EKG	Ekoi.com–Gaspesien	Canada
COD	Colombia–Comcel	Colombia
EPM	EPM–UNE	Colombia
GOB	Gobernación de Antioquia-Indeportes Antioquia	Colombia
MOT	Movistar Continental Team	Colombia
FUN	Start Cycling Team–Atacama Flowery Desert	Paraguay
BHD	BMC–Hincapie Sportswear Team	United States
BLS	Bontrager–Livestrong	United States
CDT	Chipotle–First Solar Development Team	United States
JSH	Jamis–Sutter Home	United States
JBC	Jelly Belly Cycling Team	United States
KPC	Kenda–5-hour Energy	United States
XRG	Team Exergy	United States
TMK	Team Mountain Khakis–SmartStop	United States
OPT	Optum–Kelly Benefit Strategies	United States
WPC	Wonderful Pistachios	United States

=== List of 2012 UCI Asia Tour teams ===
Code	Official Team Name	Country
SLY	China 361° Cycling Team	China
GTC	Gan Su Sports Lottery Cycling Team	China
HEN	Hengxiang Cycling Team	China
HBR	Holy Brother Cycling Team	China
MSS	Max Success Sports	China
TYD	Qinghai Tianyoude Cycling Team	China
AZC	Azad University Cross Team	Iran
MSK	Mes–Kerman	Iran
TPT	Tabriz Petrochemical Team	Iran
AS2	Continental Team Astana	Kazakhstan
AIS	Aisan Racing Team	Japan
BGT	Bridgestone–Anchor	Japan
CSZ	Cannondale–SpaceZeroPoint	Japan
MTR	Matrix Powertag	Japan
SMN	Shimano Racing Team	Japan
PPO	Team Nippo	Japan
UKO	Team Ukyo	Japan
BLZ	Utsunomiya Blitzen	Japan
GGC	Geumsan Ginseng Cello	South Korea
KSP	KSPO	South Korea
SCT	Seoul Cycling Team	South Korea
TSI	OCBC Singapore Continental Cycling Team	Singapore
TSG	Terengganu Cycling Team	Malaysia
ACT	Action Cycling Team	Taiwan
RTS	RTS Racing Team	Taiwan
TSM	Team Senter–Merida	Taiwan

=== List of 2012 UCI Europe Tour teams ===
Code	Official Team Name	Country
KTM	Arbö–Gebrüder Weiss–Oberndorfer	Austria
RAD	RC Arbö–Wels–Gourmetfein	Austria
VBG	Team Vorarlberg	Austria
TIR	Tirol Cycling Team	Austria
WSA	WSA–Viperbike	Austria
SKT	An Post–Sean Kelly	Belgium
BKP	BKCP–Powerplus	Belgium
CMD	Colba–Superano Ham	Belgium
FWB	Idemasport–Biowanze	Belgium
JVC	Jong Vlaanderen	Belgium
PCW	T.Palm–Pôle Continental Wallon	Belgium
SUN	Sunweb–Revor	Belgium
FID	Telenet–Fidea	Belgium
WBC	Wallonie Bruxelles–Crédit Agricole	Belgium
LOB	Loborika Favorit Team	Croatia
MKT	Meridiana–Kamen	Croatia
ASP	AC Sparta Praha	Czech Republic
ADP	ASC Dukla Praha	Czech Republic
PSK	Whirlpool–Author	Czech Republic
BWC	Blue Water Cycling	Denmark
CWO	Christina Watches–Onfone	Denmark
DKK	Team Designa Køkken–Knudsgaard	Denmark
GLU	Glud & Marstrand–LRØ	Denmark
JJS	J.Jensen–Sandstød Salg Og Event	Denmark
VPC	Forsikring–Himmerland	Denmark
TTF	Team TreFor	Denmark
BUR	Burgos BH–Castilla y Leon	Spain
ORB	Orbea	Spain
AUB	Auber 93	France
LPM	La Pomme Marseille	France
RLM	Roubaix–Lille Métropole	France
VRU	Véranda Rideau–Super U	France
EDR	Endura Racing	United Kingdom
NGR	Node 4–Giordana Racing	United Kingdom
RCS	Rapha Condor–Sharp	United Kingdom
IGS	Team IG–Sigma Sport	United Kingdom
RAL	Team Raleigh–GAC	United Kingdom
UKY	Team UK Youth	United Kingdom
LKT	LKT Team Brandenburg	Germany
TSP	Nutrixxion–Abus	Germany
TTR	Team Raiko–Stölting	Germany
TRS	Eddy Merckx–Indeland	Germany
THF	Team Heizomat	Germany
NSP	Team NSP–Ghost	Germany
SCS	Team Specialized Concept Store	Germany
TET	Thüringer Energie Team	Germany
TKT	Gios Deyser–Leon Kastro	Greece
SPT	SP Tableware Cycling Team	Greece
MIE	Miche–Guerciotti	Italy
IDE	Team Idea	Italy
WIT	Team WIT	Italy
ALB	Alpha Baltic–Unitymarathons.com	Latvia
RBD	Rietumu–Delfin	Latvia
LET	Leopard–Trek Continental Team	Luxembourg
CCD	Differdange–Magic–SportFood.de	Luxembourg
RIJ	Cycling Team De Rijke	Netherlands
CJP	Cycling Team Jo Piels	Netherlands
KOG	Koga Cycling Team	Netherlands
MET	Metec Continental Cyclingteam	Netherlands
RB3	Rabobank Continental Team	Netherlands
AUC	Argon 18–Unaas Cycling	Norway
FRT	Frøy–Trek	Norway
TJB	Joker–Merida	Norway
OCM	Oneco–Mesterhus Cycling Team	Norway
PBC	Plussbank BMC	Norway
KRA	Team Ringeriks–Kraft Look	Norway
OHR	Team Øster Hus–Ridley	Norway
BGZ	Bank BGŻ	Poland
BDC	BDC–Marcpol Team	Poland
CCC	CCC–Polkowice	Poland
WIB	Wibatech–LMGK Ziemia Brzeska	Poland
PRT	Carmim–Prio	Portugal
EFG	Efapel–Glassdrive	Portugal
LAR	LA–Antarte	Portugal
BOA	Onda	Portugal
TCT	Tuşnad Cycling Team	Romania
TIK	Itera–Katusha	Russia
LOK	Lokosphinx	Russia
ADR	Adria Mobil	Slovenia
RAR	Radenska	Slovenia
SAK	Sava	Slovenia
ARH	Atlas Personal–Jakroo	Switzerland
DUK	Dukla Trenčín–Trek	Slovakia
TCC	Team Cykelcity.se	Sweden
KTS	Konya–Torku Şekerspor	Turkey
SLC	Salcano–Arnavutkoy	Turkey
AMO	Amore & Vita	Ukraine
ISD	ISD–Lampre Continental	Ukraine
KLS	Kolss Cycling Team	Ukraine

=== List of 2012 UCI Oceania Tour teams ===
Code	Official Team Name	Country
DPC	Drapac Cycling	Australia
GEN	Genesys Wealth Advisers	Australia
BFL	Team Budget Forklifts	Australia
JAI	Team Jayco–AIS	Australia
PBR	PureBlack Racing	New Zealand
SUB	Subway Cycling Team	New Zealand

Preceded by 2011	List of UCI Professional Continental and Continental teams 2012	Succeeded by 2013
