= List of 2011 UCI Professional Continental and Continental teams =

Listed below are the UCI Professional Continental and Continental Teams that compete in road bicycle racing events of the UCI Continental Circuits organised by the International Cycling Union (UCI). The UCI Continental Circuits are divided in 5 continental zones, America, Europe, Asia, Africa and Oceania.

== UCI Professional Continental Teams ==
According to the UCI Rulebook, "a professional continental team is an organisation created to take part in road events open to professional continental teams. It is known by a unique name and registered with the UCI in accordance with the provisions below.

- The professional continental team comprises all the riders registered with the UCI as members of the team, the paying agent, the sponsors and all other persons contracted by the paying agent and/or the sponsors to provide for the continuing operation of the team (manager, team manager, coach, paramedical assistant, mechanic, etc.).
- Each professional continental team must employ at least 14 riders, 2 team managers and 3 other staff (paramedical assistants, mechanics, etc.) on a full time basis for the whole registration year."

=== List of 2011 UCI Africa Tour professional teams ===
Code	Official Team Name	Country	Website
	No team registered		

=== List of 2011 UCI America Tour professional teams ===
Code	Official Team Name	Country
CSM	SpiderTech–C10	Canada
COL	Colombia es Pasión–Café de Colombia	Colombia
TT1	Team Type 1–Sanofi	United States
UHC	UnitedHealthcare	United States

=== List of 2011 UCI Asia Tour professional teams ===
Code	Official Team Name	Country
	No Team registered	

=== List of 2011 UCI Europe Tour professional teams ===
Code	Official Team Name	Country
LAN	Landbouwkrediet–Colnago	Belgium
TSV	Team Flanders–Baloise	Belgium
VWA	Intermarché–Wanty	Belgium
ACG	Andalucía–Caja Granada	Spain
CJR	Caja Rural	Spain
GEO	Geox–TMC	Spain
BSC	Bretagne–Schuller	France
COF	Cofidis	France
FDJ	FDJ	France
SAU	Saur–Sojasun	France
EUC	Team Europcar	France
FAR	Farnese Vini–Neri Sottoli	United Kingdom
APP	Team NetApp	Germany
COG	Colnago–CSF Inox	Ireland
DER	De Rosa–Ceramica Flaminia	Ireland
ASA	Acqua & Sapone	Italy
AND	Androni Giocattoli	Italy
SKS	Skil–Shimano	Netherlands
CCC	CCC–Polsat–Polkowice	Poland

=== List of 2011 UCI Oceania Tour professional teams ===
Code	Official Team Name	Country
	No team registered	

== UCI Continental Teams ==
According to the UCI Rulebook, "a UCI continental team is a team of road riders recognised and licensed to take part in events on the continental calendars by the national federation of the nationality of the majority of its riders and registered with the UCI. The precise structure (legal and financial status, registration, guarantees, standard contract, etc.) of these teams shall be determined by the regulations of the national federation."

Riders may be professional or amateur. The nation under which the team is registered is the nation under which the majority of its riders are registered, a rule which men's continental teams share with women's teams.

=== List of 2011 UCI Africa Tour teams ===
Code	Official Team Name	Country
GSP	Groupement Sportif Petrolier Algérie	Algeria
VAA	Ville d'Alger–Ain Benian	Algeria
MTN	MTN–Qhubeka	South Africa
BNT	Team Bonitas	South Africa

=== List of 2011 UCI America Tour teams ===
Code	Official Team Name	Country
DAT	Clube DataRo de Ciclismo–Foz do Iguaçu	Brazil
FUN	Funvic–Pindamonhangaba	Brazil
EPM	EPM–UNE	Colombia
GOB	Gobernación de Antioquia-Indeportes Antioquia	Colombia
MOT	Movistar Continental Team	Colombia
BPC	Bissell	United States
CDT	Chipotle–Garmin Development Team	United States
JSH	Jamis–Sutter Home	United States
JBC	Jelly Belly–Kenda	United States
KBS	Kelly Benefit Strategies–OptumHealth	United States
KPC	Kenda–5-hour Energy	United States
RCC	Realcyclist.com Cycling Team	United States
XRG	Team Exergy	United States
TLS	Trek–Livestrong	United States
WPC	Wonderful Pistachios	United States

=== List of 2011 UCI Asia Tour teams ===
Code	Official Team Name	Country
JLC	China Jilun Cycling Team	China
GAM	Gammax	China
HEN	Hengxiang Cycling Team	China
HBR	Holy Brother Cycling Team	China
MPC	Marco Polo	China
MSS	Max Success Sports	China
TYD	Qinghai Tianyoude Cycling Team	China
CHA	Champion System	Hong Kong
IUA	Azad University	Iran
SUR	Suren Cycling Team	Iran
TPT	Tabriz Petrochemical Cycling Team	Iran
VAK	Vali ASR Kerman Team	Iran
AIS	Aisan Racing Team	Japan
BGT	Bridgestone–Anchor	Japan
MTR	Matrix Powertag	Japan
SMN	Shimano Racing Team	Japan
BLZ	Utsunomiya Blitzen	Japan
GGA	Geumsan Ginseng Asia	South Korea
KSP	KSPO	South Korea
SCT	Seoul Cycling Team	South Korea
L2A	LeTua Cycling Team	Malaysia
TSG	Terengganu Cycling Team	Malaysia
ACT	Action Cycling Team	Taiwan
FCT	Fuji–Cyclingtime.com	Taiwan
GKT	Giant Kenda Cycling Team	Taiwan

=== List of 2011 UCI Europe Tour teams ===
Code	Official Team Name	Country
KTM	Arbö–Gebrüder Weiss–Oberndorfer	Austria
RAD	RC Arbö–Gourmetfein–Wels	Austria
VBG	Team Vorarlberg	Austria
TYR	Tyrol Team	Austria
URT	Union Raiffeisen Radteam Tirol	Austria
WSA	WSA–Viperbike Kärnten	Austria
SKT	An Post–Sean Kelly	Belgium
BKP	BKCP–Powerplus	Belgium
CMD	Colba–Mercury	Belgium
QCT	Donckers Koffie–Jelly Belly	Belgium
JVB	Jong Vlaanderen–Bauknecht	Belgium
PCW	Lotto–Bodysol–Pôle Continental Wallon	Belgium
SUN	Sunweb–Revor	Belgium
FID	Telenet–Fidea	Belgium
WBC	Wallonie Bruxelles–Crédit Agricole	Belgium
LOB	Loborika Favorit Team	Croatia
MKT	Meridiana–Kamen	Croatia
ASP	AC Sparta Praha	Czech Republic
ADP	ASC Dukla Praha	Czech Republic
PSK	PSK Whirlpool–Author	Czech Republic
GLU	Glud & Marstrand–LRØ	Denmark
TST	Christina Watches–Onfone	Denmark
VPC	Concordia Forsikring–Himmerland	Denmark
TEF	Team Energi FYN	Denmark
VMC	Burgos 2016–Castilla y León	Spain
ORB	Orbea	Spain
AUB	BigMat–Auber 93	France
RLM	Roubaix–Lille Métropole	France
EDR	Endura Racing	United Kingdom
MPT	Motorpoint Pro–Cycling Team	United Kingdom
RCS	Rapha Condor–Sharp	United Kingdom
SGS	Sigma Sport–Specialized	United Kingdom
RAL	Team Raleigh	United Kingdom
LKT	LKT Team Brandenburg	Germany
TSP	Team Nutrixxion–Sparkasse	Germany
TSS	Seven Stones	Germany
TRS	Eddy Merckx–Indeland	Germany
THF	Team Heizomat Mapei	Germany
NSP	Team NSP	Germany
TET	Thüringer Energie Team	Germany
TTR	Test Team Raiko–Argon 18	Germany
TKT	KTM–Murcia	Greece
SPT	SP Tableware	Greece
WOB	Team Worldofbike.gr	Greece
OHT	Ora Hotels–Carrera	Hungary
DAN	D'Angelo & Antenucci–Nippo	Italy
DSL	DSL	Italy
MIE	Miche–Guerciotti	Italy
ALB	Alpha Baltic–Unitymarathons.com	Latvia
LPM	La Pomme Marseille	Latvia
CCD	Differdange–Magic–SportFood.de	Luxembourg
RIJ	Cycling Team De Rijke	Netherlands
CJP	Cycling Team Jo Piels	Netherlands
RB3	Rabobank Continental Team	Netherlands
TJB	Joker–Merida	Norway
PBC	Plussbank Cervélo	Norway
KRA	Team Ringeriks–Kraft	Norway
SPV	Sparebanken Vest–Ridley	Norway
DHL	Bank BGŻ	Poland
LEG	Legia–Felt	Poland
BSP	Barbot–Efapel	Portugal
LAR	LA–Antarte	Portugal
BOA	Onda	Portugal
PRT	Tavira–Prio	Portugal
TCT	Tuşnad Cycling Team	Romania
TIK	Itera–Katusha	Russia
ADR	Adria Mobil	Slovenia
PER	Perutnina Ptuj	Slovenia
RAR	Radenska	Slovenia
SAK	Sava	Slovenia
ZAN	Partizan Powermove	Serbia
ARH	Atlas Personal	Switzerland
PYB	Price Your Bike	Switzerland
DUK	Dukla Trenčín–Merida	Slovakia
CYK	Team Cykelcity	Sweden
KTS	Konya–Şekerspor–Torku–Vivelo	Turkey
MNS	Manisaspor Cycling Team	Turkey
AMO	Amore & Vita	Ukraine
ISD	ISD–Lampre Continental	Ukraine
KLS	Kolss Cycling Team	Ukraine

=== List of 2011 UCI Oceania Tour teams ===
Code	Official Team Name	Country
DPC	Drapac Professional Cycling	Australia
GEN	Genesys Wealth Advisers	Australia
BFL	Team Budget Forklifts	Australia
JAI	Team Jayco–AIS	Australia
VAU	V Australia	Australia
PBR	PureBlack Racing	New Zealand
SUB	Subway Cycling Team	New Zealand

Preceded by 2010	List of UCI Professional Continental and Continental teams 2011	Succeeded by 2012
