= List of 2009 UCI Professional Continental and Continental teams =

Listed below are the UCI Professional Continental and Continental Teams that compete in road bicycle racing events of the UCI Continental Circuits organised by the International Cycling Union (UCI). The UCI Continental Circuits are divided in 5 continental zones, America, Europe, Asia, Africa and Oceania.

All lists updated as of April 30, 2009.

== UCI professional continental teams ==
According to the UCI Rulebook, "a professional continental team is an organisation created to take part in road events open to professional continental teams. It is known by a unique name and registered with the UCI in accordance with the provisions below.

- The professional continental team comprises all the riders registered with the UCI as members of the team, the paying agent, the sponsors and all other persons contracted by the paying agent and/or the sponsors to provide for the continuing operation of the team (manager, team manager, coach, paramedical assistant, mechanic, etc.).
- Each professional continental team must employ at least 14 riders, 2 team managers and 3 other staff (paramedical assistants, mechanics, etc.) on a full time basis for the whole registration year."

=== List of 2009 UCI Africa tour professional teams ===
| Code | Official Team Name | Country | Website |
|---|---|---|---|
| | No team registered | | |

=== List of 2009 UCI America Tour professional teams ===
| Code | Official Team Name | Country |
|---|---|---|
| BMC | CCC Pro Team | United States |
| SDA | GW Erco Shimano | Venezuela |

=== List of 2009 UCI Asia Tour professional teams ===
| Code | Official Team Name | Country |
|---|---|---|
| | No Team registered | |

=== List of 2009 UCI Europe Tour professional teams ===
| Code | Official Team Name | Country |
|---|---|---|
| ELK | Elk Haus | Austria |
| VBG | Team Vorarlberg | Austria |
| LAN | Landbouwkrediet–Colnago | Belgium |
| TSV | Topsport Vlaanderen–Mercator | Belgium |
| PSK | PSK Whirlpool–Author | Czech Republic |
| ACA | Andalucía–Cajasur | Spain |
| MCO | Contentpolis–Ampo | Spain |
| XGZ | Xacobeo–Galicia | Spain |
| AGR | Agritubel | France |
| BAR | Barloworld | United Kingdom |
| FLM | Ceramica Flaminia–Bossini Docce | Ireland |
| CSF | CSF Group–Navigare | Ireland |
| LPR | LPR Brakes–Farnese Vini | Ireland |
| ASA | Acqua & Sapone–Caffè Mokambo | Italy |
| ISD | ISD–NERI | Italy |
| SKS | Skil–Shimano | Netherlands |
| VAC | Vacansoleil | Netherlands |
| AMI | Amica Chips–Knauf | San Marino |
| CTT | Cervélo TestTeam | Switzerland |

=== List of 2009 UCI Oceania Tour professional teams ===
| Code | Official Team Name | Country |
|---|---|---|
| | No team registered | |

== UCI Continental Teams ==
According to the UCI Rulebook, "a UCI continental team is a team of road riders recognised and licensed to take part in events on the continental calendars by the national federation of the nationality of the majority of its riders and registered with the UCI. The precise structure (legal and financial status, registration, guarantees, standard contract, etc.) of these teams shall be determined by the regulations of the national federation."

Riders may be professional or amateur.

=== List of 2009 UCI Africa Tour teams ===
| Code | Official Team Name | Country |
|---|---|---|
| HOP | House of Paint | South Africa |
| MTN | MTN Cycling | South Africa |
| KON | Team Konica Minolta–Bizhub | South Africa |
| NEO | Team Neotel-Stegcomputer | South Africa |

=== List of 2009 UCI America Tour teams ===
| Code | Official Team Name | Country |
|---|---|---|
| TRP | Planet Energy | Canada |
| BOY | Boyacá es Para Vivirla | Colombia |
| CEP | Colombia es Pasión–Coldeportes | Colombia |
| TUA | Tecos de la Universidad Autónoma de Guadalajara | Mexico |
| AMO | Amore & Vita–McDonald's | United States |
| BPC | Bissell | United States |
| COL | Colombia | United States |
| JBC | Jelly Belly Cycling Team | United States |
| KBS | Kelly Benefit Strategies | United States |
| KPC | Kenda–Spinergy | United States |
| LRO | Land Rover-Orbea | United States |
| OCM | OUCH–Maxxis | United States |
| RRC | Rock Racing | United States |
| TMK | Team Mountain Khakis | United States |
| TT1 | Team Type 1 | United States |
| TLS | Trek–Livestrong | United States |

=== List of 2009 UCI Asia Tour teams ===
| Code | Official Team Name | Country |
|---|---|---|
| MSS | Max Success Sports | China |
| TYD | Qinghai Tianyoude Cycling Team | China |
| MPC | Trek–Marco Polo | China |
| PSN | Polygon Sweet Nice Team | Indonesia |
| IAU | Islamic Azad University Cycling Team | Iran |
| TPT | Tabriz Petrochemical Team | Iran |
| AIS | Aisan Racing Team | Japan |
| BLZ | Blitzen Utsunomiya Pro Racing | Japan |
| EQA | EQA-Meitan Hompo-Graphite Design | Japan |
| MTR | Matrix Powertag | Japan |
| SMN | Shimano Racing Team | Japan |
| BGT | Bridgestone–Anchor | Japan |
| SCT | Seoul Cycling Team | Korea |
| L2A | LeTua Cycling Team | Malaysia |
| MCF | MNCF Continental Team | Malaysia |
| DOT | Doha Team | Qatar |
| GNT | Giant Asia Racing Team | Taiwan |

=== List of 2009 UCI Europe Tour teams ===
| Code | Official Team Name | Country |
|---|---|---|
| ANG | Andorra-Grandvalira | Andorra |
| KTM | KTM–Junkers | Austria |
| RAD | RC Arbö–Wels–Gourmetfein | Austria |
| TYR | Tyrol–Team Radland Tirol | Austria |
| BKP | BKCP–Powerplus | Belgium |
| FID | Telenet–Fidea | Belgium |
| JVB | Jong Vlaanderen–Bauknecht | Belgium |
| JOS | Josan Isorex Mercedes Benz AALST-CT | Belgium |
| PCW | Lotto–Bodysol | Belgium |
| PCO | Palmans-Cras | Belgium |
| PZC | Profel Continental Team | Belgium |
| REV | Revor-Jartazi Cycling Team | Belgium |
| SUN | Sunweb–Projob | Belgium |
| WIL | Verandas Willems | Belgium |
| CCB | Cycling Club Bourgas | Bulgaria |
| LOB | Loborika | Croatia |
| ASP | AC Sparta Praha | Czech Republic |
| WIN | CK Windoor's Pribram | Czech Republic |
| BWC | Bluewater-Cycling for Health | Denmark |
| GLU | Glud & Marstrand–Horsens | Denmark |
| CPI | Team Capinordic | Denmark |
| VPC | Concordia–Vesthimmerland | Denmark |
| TDK | Team Designa Køkken | Denmark |
| TEF | Team Energi FYN | Denmark |
| TST | Team Stenca Trading | Denmark |
| VMC | Burgos Monumental–Castilla y León | Spain |
| ORB | Orbea | Spain |
| KCT | Meridiana-Kalev Chocolate Team | Estonia |
| AUB | Auber 93 | France |
| BCS | Besson Chaussures–Sojasun | France |
| BSC | Bretagne–Schuller | France |
| RLM | Roubaix–Lille Métropole | France |
| CTV | Candi TV-Marshalls Pasta Rt | United Kingdom |
| EDR | Endura Racing | United Kingdom |
| PCM | Plowman Craven-Madison | United Kingdom |
| RCR | Rapha Condor | United Kingdom |
| HAF | Team Halfords Bikehut | United Kingdom |
| CTM | Continental Team Milram | Germany |
| TMH | Team Heizomat Mapei | Germany |
| LKT | LK Team Brandenburg | Germany |
| TSS | Seven Stones | Germany |
| TRS | Kuota–Indeland | Germany |
| TSP | Team Nutrixxion Sparkasse | Germany |
| TET | Thüringer Energie Team | Germany |
| TKT | Heraklion-Nessebar | Greece |
| SPT | Sp. Tableware-Gatsoulis Bikes | Greece |
| WOB | Team Worldofbike.gr | Greece |
| BLM | Betonexpressz 200-Limonta | Hungary |
| SKT | An Post–M.Donnelly–Grant Thornton–Sean Kelly | Ireland |
| CMO | Carmioodoro-A Style | Italy |
| CZP | Centri Della Calzatura | Italy |
| CCD | Continental Team Differdange | Luxembourg |
| CJP | Cycling Team Jo Piels | Netherlands |
| KST | KrolStonE Continental Team | Netherlands |
| RB3 | Rabobank Continental Team | Netherlands |
| VVE | Van Vliet EBH Elshof | Netherlands |
| TMB | Joker–Bianchi | Norway |
| SPV | Sparebanken Vest–Ridley | Norway |
| TTA | Team Trek Adecco | Norway |
| CCC | CCC–Polsat–Polkowice | Poland |
| DHL | DHL-Author | Poland |
| LEG | Legia-Felt | Poland |
| MRZ | Mroz Continental Team | Poland |
| UTE | Team Utensilnord | Poland |
| BSP | Barbot–Siper | Portugal |
| CCL | CC Loulé–Louletano–Aquashow | Portugal |
| FRM | Fercase-Paredes Rota Dos Moveis | Portugal |
| LSE | Liberty Seguros | Portugal |
| MAD | Madeinox Boavista | Portugal |
| TCT | Tuşnad Cycling Team | Romania |
| KUB | Cycling Team Kuban | Russia |
| KTA | Katusha Continental Team | Russia |
| MOW | Moscow | Russia |
| ADR | Adria Mobil | Slovenia |
| MDR | Motomat Delo Revije | Slovenia |
| RAD | Radenska–KD Financial Point | Slovenia |
| SAK | Sava | Slovenia |
| MIE | Miche–Silver Cross–Selle Italia | San Marino |
| ARH | Atlas Romer's-Hausbäckerei | Switzerland |
| HAD | Nazionale Elettronica New Slot-Hamidec | Switzerland |
| DUK | Dukla Trenčín–Merida | Slovakia |
| CSP | Cyclesport.se-Magnus Maximus Coffee.com | Sweden |

=== List of 2009 UCI Oceania Tour teams ===
| Code | Official Team Name | Country |
|---|---|---|
| CDU | Cinelli-Down Under | Australia |
| DPC | Drapac–Porsche Cycling | Australia |
| VAU | Fly V Australia | Australia |
| PRA | Praties | Australia |
| RSR | Ride Sport Racing / Prime Estate | Australia |
| TRR | Rush Racing | Australia |
| SLV | Savings & Loan Cycling Team | Australia |
| SAI | Team AIS | Australia |
| BFL | Team Budget Forklifts | Australia |
| SWA | Subway–Avanti Cycling Team | New Zealand |

| Preceded by 2008 | List of UCI Professional Continental and Continental teams 2009 | Succeeded by 2010 |
