= List of 2010 UCI Professional Continental and Continental teams =

Listed below are the UCI Professional Continental and Continental Teams that compete in road bicycle racing events of the UCI Continental Circuits organised by the International Cycling Union (UCI). The UCI Continental Circuits are divided in 5 continental zones, America, Europe, Asia, Africa and Oceania.

All lists updated as of January 31, 2010.

== UCI Professional Continental Teams ==
According to the UCI Rulebook, "a professional continental team is an organisation created to take part in road events open to professional continental teams. It is known by a unique name and registered with the UCI in accordance with the provisions below.

- The professional continental team comprises all the riders registered with the UCI as members of the team, the paying agent, the sponsors and all other persons contracted by the paying agent and/or the sponsors to provide for the continuing operation of the team (manager, team manager, coach, paramedical assistant, mechanic, etc.).
- Each professional continental team must employ at least 14 riders, 2 team managers and 3 other staff (paramedical assistants, mechanics, etc.) on a full time basis for the whole registration year."

=== List of 2010 UCI Africa Tour professional teams ===
Code	Official Team Name	Country	Website
	No team registered		

=== List of 2010 UCI America Tour professional teams ===
Code	Official Team Name	Country
SJC	Scott–Marcondes Cesar–São José dos Campos	Brazil
BMC	BMC Racing Team	United States

=== List of 2010 UCI Asia Tour professional teams ===
Code	Official Team Name	Country
	No Team registered	

=== List of 2010 UCI Europe Tour professional teams ===
Code	Official Team Name	Country
LAN	Landbouwkrediet	Belgium
TSV	Topsport Vlaanderen–Mercator	Belgium
ACA	Andalucía–Cajasur	Spain
XAC	Xacobeo–Galicia	Spain
BBO	Bbox Bouygues Telecom	France
COF	Cofidis	France
SAU	Saur–Sojasun	France
CMO	Carmiooro NGC	United Kingdom
FLM	Ceramica Flaminia	Ireland
CSF	Colnago–CSF Inox	Ireland
DER	De Rosa–Stac Plastic	Ireland
ASA	Acqua & Sapone	Italy
AND	Androni Giocattoli	Italy
ISD	ISD–NERI	Italy
SKS	Skil–Shimano	Netherlands
VAC	Vacansoleil	Netherlands
CCC	CCC–Polsat–Polkowice	Poland
CTT	Cervélo TestTeam	Switzerland

=== List of 2010 UCI Oceania Tour professional teams ===
Code	Official Team Name	Country
	No team registered	

== UCI Continental Teams ==
According to the UCI Rulebook, "a UCI continental team is a team of road riders recognised and licensed to take part in events on the continental calendars by the national federation of the nationality of the majority of its riders and registered with the UCI. The precise structure (legal and financial status, registration, guarantees, standard contract, etc.) of these teams shall be determined by the regulations of the national federation."

Riders may be professional or amateur. The nation under which the team is registered is the nation under which the majority of its riders are registered, a rule which men's continental teams share with women's teams.

=== List of 2010 UCI Africa Tour teams ===
Code	Official Team Name	Country
MTN	MTN–Energade	South Africa

=== List of 2010 UCI America Tour teams ===
Code	Official Team Name	Country
FUN	Funvic–Pindamonhangaba	Brazil
CSM	SpiderTech–Planet Energy	Canada
CEP	Café de Colombia–Colombia es Pasión	Colombia
EPM	EPM–UNE	Colombia
ADG	Adageo Energy	United States
BFN	Bahati Foundation	United States
BPC	Bissell	United States
JSH	Jamis–Sutter Home	United States
JBC	Jelly Belly–Kenda	United States
KBS	Kelly Benefit Strategies	United States
KPC	Kenda–Gear Grinder	United States
TMK	Team Mountain Khakis	United States
TT1	Team Type 1	United States
TLS	Trek–Livestrong	United States
UHC	Motiv3	United States

=== List of 2010 UCI Asia Tour teams ===
Code	Official Team Name	Country
CKT	CKT TMIT-Champion System	Armenia
HBR	Holy Brother	China
MPC	Marco Polo	China
MSS	Max Success Sports	China
TYD	Qinghai Tianyoude Cycling Team	China
PSN	Polygon Sweet Nice	Indonesia
IAU	Azad University Iran	Iran
TPT	Tabriz Petrochemical Team	Iran
VAK	Vali ASR Kerman Team	Iran
AIS	Aisan Racing Team	Japan
BGT	Bridgestone–Anchor	Japan
SMN	Shimano Racing Team	Japan
PPO	CDC–Cavaliere	Japan
BLZ	Utsunomiya Blitzen	Japan
GGA	Geumsan Ginseng Asia	South Korea
KSP	KSPO	South Korea
SCT	Seoul Cycling Team	South Korea
GNT	Giant Asia Racing Team	Chinese Taipei
L2A	LeTua Cycling Team	Malaysia
PSN	Polygon Sweet Nice Team	Indonesia

=== List of 2010 UCI Europe Tour teams ===
Code	Official Team Name	Country
RAD	RC Arbö–Gourmetfein–Wels	Austria
KTM	Arbö KTM–Gebrüder Weiss	Austria
TYR	Tyrol–Team Radland Tirol	Austria
VBG	Vorarlberg–Corratec	Austria
SKT	An Post–Sean Kelly	Belgium
BKP	BKCP–Powerplus	Belgium
JVB	Jong Vlaanderen–Bauknecht	Belgium
PCW	Lotto–Bodysol	Belgium
PCO	Palmans–Cras	Belgium
QCT	Qin Cycling Team	Belgium
SUN	Sunweb–Revor	Belgium
FID	Telenet–Fidea	Belgium
WIL	Verandas Willems	Belgium
HEM	Hemus 1896–Vivelo	Bulgaria
LOB	Loborika	Croatia
MKT	Meridiana–Kamen	Croatia
ASP	AC Sparta Praha	Czech Republic
PSK	PSK Whirlpool–Author	Czech Republic
GLU	Glud & Marstrand–LRØ Radgivning	Denmark
VPC	Concordia Forsikring–Himmerland	Denmark
DBW	Team Designa Køkken–Blue Water	Denmark
TEF	Team Energi FYN	Denmark
VMC	Burgos 2016–Castilla y León	Spain
CJR	Caja Rural	Spain
ORB	Orbea	Spain
KCT	Kalev Chocolate Team-Kuota	Estonia
AUB	BigMat–Auber 93	France
BSC	Bretagne–Schuller	France
RLM	Roubaix–Lille Métropole	France
EDR	Endura Racing	United Kingdom
MPT	Motorpoint–Marshalls Pasta	United Kingdom
RCS	Rapha Condor–Sharp	United Kingdom
SGS	Sigma Sport–Specialized	United Kingdom
RAL	Team Raleigh	United Kingdom
TMH	Team Heizomat Mapei	Germany
LKT	LKT Team Brandenburg	Germany
TSS	Seven Stones	Germany
TRS	Kuota–Indeland	Germany
APP	Team NetApp	Germany
TSP	Team Nutrixxion Sparkasse	Germany
TET	Thüringer Energie Team	Germany
TKT	Cinelli-Heraklion	Greece
SPT	SP Tableware	Greece
WOB	Team Worldofbike.gr	Greece
BUC	Betonexpressz 200-Universal Caffè	Hungary
CDC	CDC–Cavaliere	Italy
MIE	Miche	Italy
CCD	Continental Team Differdange	Luxembourg
CJP	Cycling Team Jo Piels	Netherlands
RB3	Rabobank Continental Team	Netherlands
VVE	Van Vliet EBH Elshof	Netherlands
TJB	Joker–Bianchi	Norway
PBC	Plussbank Cervélo	Norway
KRA	Team Ringeriks–Kraft	Norway
SPV	Sparebanken Vest–Ridley	Norway
AKT	Aktio Group Mostostal Puławy	Poland
DHL	DHL–Author	Poland
MRO	Mróz–Active Jet	Poland
BSP	Barbot–Siper	Portugal
BOA	Madeinox–Boavista	Portugal
CCL	CC Loulé–Louletano–Aquashow	Portugal
LRM	LA Alumínios–Rota dos Móveis	Portugal
TIK	Itera–Katusha	Russia
KTA	Continental Team Katusha–Alpecin	Russia
KUB	Kuban (cycling team)	Russia
MOW	Moscow	Russia
ADR	Adria Mobil	Slovenia
ODR	Obrazi Delo Revije	Slovenia
SAK	Sava (cycling team)	Slovenia
RAR	Zheroquadro–Radenska	Slovenia
ARH	Atlas Personal-BMC	Switzerland
PCB	Price-Custom Bikes	Switzerland
DUK	Dukla Trenčín–Merida	Slovakia
SPK	Team Sprocket	Sweden
AMO	Amore & Vita–Conad	Ukraine
ISE	ISD Continental Team	Ukraine
KLS	Kolss Cycling Team	Ukraine

=== List of 2010 UCI Oceania Tour teams ===
Code	Official Team Name	Country
DPC	Drapac–Porsche Cycling	Australia
VAU	Fly V Australia	Australia
GEN	Genesys Wealth Advisers	Australia
JAS	Team Jayco–Skins	Australia
SWA	Subway-Avanti	New Zealand

Preceded by 2009	List of UCI Professional Continental and Continental teams 2010	Succeeded by 2011
