= List of 2007 UCI Professional Continental and Continental teams =

Listed below are the UCI Professional Continental and Continental Teams that compete in road bicycle racing events of the UCI Continental Circuits organised by the International Cycling Union (UCI). The UCI Continental Circuits are divided in 5 continental zones, America, Europe, Asia, Africa and Oceania.

== UCI Professional Continental Teams ==
According to the UCI Rulebook, "a professional continental team is an organisation created to take part in road events open to professional continental teams. It is known by a unique name and registered with the UCI in accordance with the provisions below.

- The professional continental team comprises all the riders registered with the UCI as members of the team, the paying agent, the sponsors and all other persons contracted by the paying agent and/or the sponsors to provide for the continuing operation of the team (manager, team manager, coach, paramedical assistant, mechanic, etc.).
- Each professional continental team must employ at least 14 riders, 2 team managers and 3 other staff (paramedical assistants, mechanics, etc.) on a full time basis for the whole registration year."

=== List of 2007 UCI Africa Tour professional teams ===
Code	Official Team Name	Country	Website
	No team registered		

=== List of 2007 UCI America Tour professional teams ===
Code	Official team name	Country
CLM	Serramenti PVC Diquigiovanni–Selle Italia	Venezuela
NIC	Navigators Insurance Cycling Team	United States
HNM	Health Net Pro Cycling Team Presented by Maxxis	United States
TSL	Team Slipstream presented by Chipotle	United States

=== List of 2007 UCI Asia Tour professional teams ===
Code	Official team name	Country
	No team registered	

=== List of 2007 UCI Europe Tour professional teams ===
Updated for 2007; retrieved on January 22, 2007

Code	Official team name	Country
VBG	Team Volksbank	Austria
ELK	Elk Haus-Simplon	Austria
LAN	Landbouwkrediet–Tönissteiner	Belgium
JAC	Chocolade Jacques–Topsport Vlaanderen	Belgium
APV	Andalucía–CajaSur	Spain
KGZ	Karpin–Galicia	Spain
REG	Relax–GAM	Spain
AGR	Agritubel	France
BAR	Barloworld	United Kingdom
DFL	DFL–Cyclingnews–Litespeed	United Kingdom
WIE	Team Wiesenhof–Felt	Germany
PAN	Ceramica Panaria–Navigare	Ireland
TEN	Tenax	Ireland
FLM	Ceramica Flaminia	Italy
ASA	Acqua & Sapone–Caffè Mokambo	Italy
TCS	Tinkoff Credit Systems	Italy
SKS	Skil–Shimano	Netherlands
INT	Intel–Action	Poland
SLB	Benfica	Portugal

=== List of 2007 UCI Oceania Tour professional teams ===
Updated for 2007; retrieved on January 22, 2007

Code	Official team name	Country
DPC	Drapac Porsche Development Program	Australia

== UCI Continental Teams ==
According to the UCI Rulebook, "a UCI continental team is a team of road riders recognised and licensed to take part in events on the continental calendars by the national federation of the nationality of the majority of its riders and registered with the UCI. The precise structure (legal and financial status, registration, guarantees, standard contract, etc.) of these teams shall be determined by the regulations of the national federation."

Riders may be professional or amateur.

=== List of 2007 UCI Africa Tour teams ===
Code	Official team name	Country
KON	Team Konica Minolta	South Africa

=== List of 2007 UCI America Tour teams ===
Updated for 2007

Code	Official team name	Country
MEM	Memorial–Fupes–Santos	Brazil
	Scott–Marcondes Cesar	Brazil
CAL	Calyon–Litespeed Pro Cycling Team	Canada
SYM	Symmetrics Cycling Team	Canada
VWT	Team Volkswagen–Trek	Canada
BOY	Boyacá es Para Vivirla–Marche Team	Colombia
CEP	Colombia es Pasión	Colombia
UOT	UNE–Orbitel	Colombia
TUA	Tecos de la Universidad de Guadalajara	Mexico
OSN	KodakGallery.com–Sierra Nevada Brewing Co.	United States
BMC	BMC Racing Team	United States
COL	Colavita / Sutter Home Presented by Cooking Light	United States
JBC	Jelly Belly Cycling Team	United States
ABB	Priority Health Cycling Team Presented by Bissell	United States
NER	Nerac Pro Cycling	United States
KBM	Kelly Benefit Strategies / Medifast	United States
RAP	Rite Aid Pro Cycling	United States
SLP	SuccessFulliving.com Presented by Parkpre	United States
RRC	Rock Racing	United States
TUT	Toyota–United Pro Cycling Team	United States
JIT	The Jittery Joe's Pro Cycling Team	United States

=== List of 2007 UCI Asia Tour teams ===
Updated for 2007

Code	Official team name	Country
MPC	Discovery Channel Marco Polo Team	China
HKG	Hong Kong Pro Cycling	Hong Kong
PSN	Polygon Sweet Nice	Indonesia
	Islamic Azad University Cycling Team	Iran
	Nippo-Meitan Hompo	Japan
	Miyata-Subaru	Japan
	Matrix Powertag	Japan
	Aisan Racing Team	Japan
L2A	LeTua Cycling Team	Malaysia
TM	Telekom Malaysia Cycling Team	Malaysia
DOT	Doha Team	Qatar
GNT	Giant Asia Racing Team	Chinese Taipei

=== List of 2007 UCI Europe Tour teams ===
Code	Official team name	Country
SWI	Team Swiag Teka	Austria
RAD	RC Arbo Resch & Frisch Wels	Austria
APO	ApoSport Krone Linz	Austria
PRA	Team Plast–Recycling–Austria	Austria
PZC	Profel Ziegler Continental Team	Belgium
PCW	Pole Continental Wallon Bergasol–Euro Millions	Belgium
PCO	Palmans–Collstrop	Belgium
PBH	Pictoflex–Bikeland–Hyundai	Belgium
BLV	Bodysol – Win for Life – Jong Vlaanderen	Belgium
ABM	Yawadoo–Colba–ABM	Belgium
JAR	Jartazi–7Mobile	Belgium
FLA	Flanders	Belgium
UBD	Unibet–Davo	Belgium
FID	Fidea Cycling Team	Belgium
TZS	Tzar Simeon–MBN	Bulgaria
CCB	Cycling Club Burgas	Bulgaria
HEM	Hemus 1896–Berneschi	Bulgaria
ADP	ASC Dukla Praha	Czech Republic
PSK	PSK Whirlpool–Hradec Králové	Czech Republic
TDL	Team Dukla Liberec	Czech Republic
ASP	AC Sparta Praha	Czech Republic
TPH	Team GLS	Denmark
DES	Team Designa Kokken	Denmark
GLU	Glud & Marstrand–Horsens	Denmark
VBT	Team Vision Bikes	Denmark
SPI	Spiuk–Extremadura	Spain
MAS	Massi	Spain
GNM	Grupo Nicolas Mateos	Spain
VMC	Viña Magna–Cropu	Spain
ORB	Orbea	Spain
KCT	Kalev Chocolate Team	Estonia
BJF	Bretagne–Armor Lux	France
AUB	Auber 93	France
PCA	Plowman Craven–Evans Cycles	United Kingdom
RCY	Recycling.co.uk	United Kingdom
TRS	Team Regionstrom–Senges	Germany
CTM	Continental Team Milram	Germany
TET	Thuringer Energie Team	Germany
STV	Stevens Racing Team	Germany
TNB	Team Notebooksbilliger.de	Germany
TLM	Team Lamonta	Germany
HVH	Heinz Von Heiden Team Hanover	Germany
TSP	Team Sparkasse	Germany
PNB	P-Nivó Betonexpressz 2000 KFT.se	Hungary
TMG	Team Murphy & Gunn / Newlyn	Ireland
SKT	Sean Kelly Team ACLVB–M. Donnelly Team	Ireland
TUC	CB Immobiliare–Universal Caffe	Italy
ODL	OTC Doors–Lauretana	Italy
RBR	Rietumu Banka–Riga	Latvia
CCD	Continental Cycling Team Differdange	Luxembourg
UBB	Ubbink–Syntec Cycling Team	Netherlands
KST	KrolStonE Continental Team	Netherlands
BEC	B&E Cycling Team	Netherlands
CJP	Cyclingteam Jo Piels	Netherlands
VVE	Van Vijet–EBH–Advocaten	Netherlands
PCH	Procomm–Van Hemert	Netherlands
RBJ	Rabobank	Netherlands
FPT	Fondas P3Transfer Team	Netherlands
LOW	Team Löwik Meubelen	Netherlands
TMB	Team Maxbo Bianchi	Norway
SPA	Team Sparebanken Vest	Norway
DHL	DHL–Author	Poland
AMO	Amore & Vita–McDonald's	Poland
NBL	Nobless	Poland
SPL	CCC Polsat	Poland
KNF	Knauf Team	Poland
MBK	MBK–Cycles–Scout	Poland
LEG	Legia–Bazyliszek	Poland
RBA	Riberalves–Alcobaça	Portugal
ASC	Vitória–ASC	Portugal
PRM	Paredes Rota dos Moveis	Portugal
BHL	Barbot–Halcon	Portugal
CAB	Riberalves–Boavista	Portugal
MAI	LA–MSS	Portugal
LAL	Liberty Seguros Continental	Portugal
DUJ	Duja–Tavira	Portugal
IMO	Madeinox–BRIC–Loule	Portugal
KOF	Tinkoff Restaurants	Russia
PRE	Premier	Russia
ODM	Omnibike Dynamo Moscow	Russia
END	Team Endeka	Serbia
PER	Perutnina Ptuj	Slovenia
RAR	Radenska Powerbar	Slovenia
SAK	Sava	Slovenia
ADR	Adria Mobil	Slovenia
HAD	Hadimec	Switzerland
DUK	Dukla Trenčín	Slovakia

=== List of 2007 UCI Oceania Tour teams ===
Code	Official team name	Country
SLV	Savings & Loans Cycling Team	Australia
SAI	SouthAustralia.com–AIS	Australia
FRF	FRF Couriers–ExcelPro	Australia

Preceded by 2006	List of UCI Professional Continental and Continental teams 2007	Succeeded by 2008
