= Liu Wei (cyclist) =

Chinese cyclist

Personal information
- Full name: Liu Wei
- Born: March 11, 1995 (age 31) China

Cycling career
- Sport: Cycling
- Discipline: Road
- Role: Rider

Professional team
- 2014–2015: China Hainan HNB Yindongli

Liu Wei (born March 11, 1995) is a Chinese cyclist, who last rode for China Yindongli Hainan–Wildto. He has participated in the 2014 Tour of Qinghai Lake, Tour of Hainan and Tour of Taihu Lake.
