= Ralf Matzka =

German road cyclist

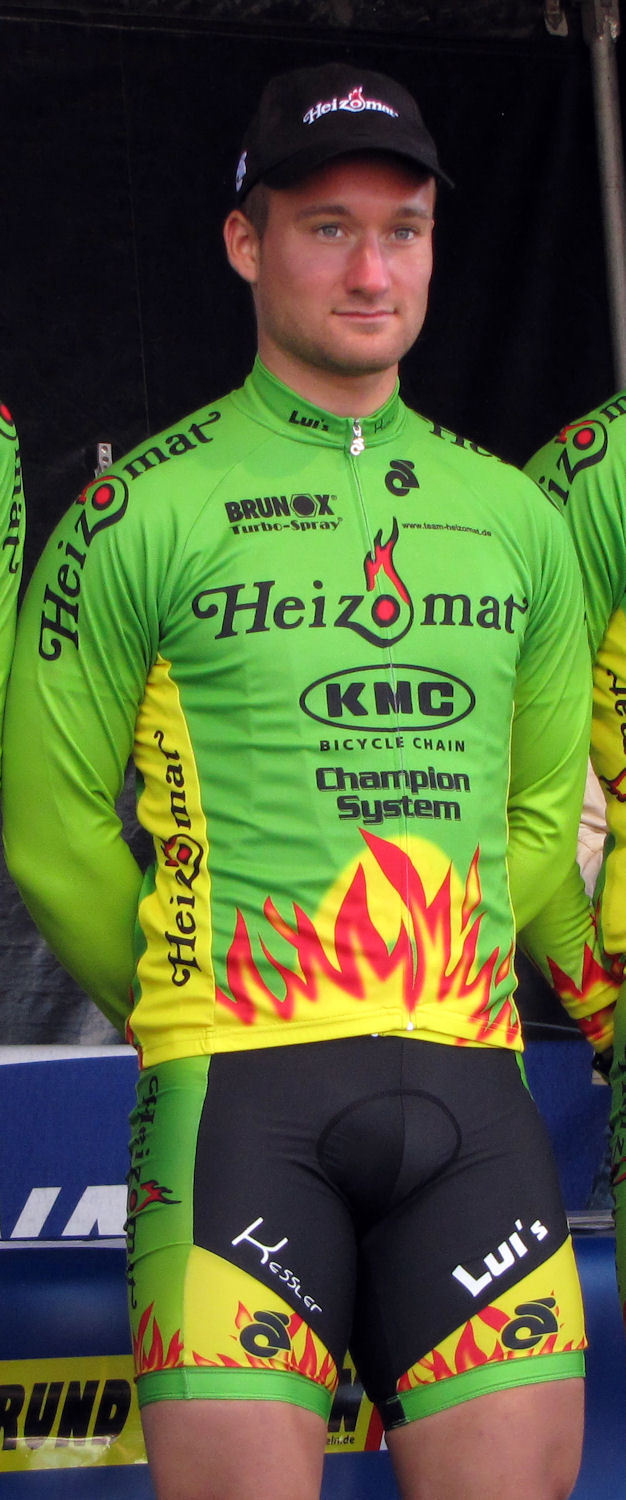
- Matzka in 2010

Personal information
- Full name: Ralf Matzka
- Born: August 24, 1989 (age 37): Villingen-Schwenningen, West Germany; (now Germany)

Cycling career
- Sport: Cycling
- Current team: Retired
- Discipline: Road
- Role: Rider
- Rider type: Sprinter

Amateur teams
- 2005–2007: RV 1909 Deißlingen
- 2006–2007: Junior Team Aguti Stuttgart
- 2009: RV 1909 Deißlingen

Professional teams
- 2008: Team Ista
- 2010: Team Heizomat Mapei
- 2011–2012: Thüringer Energie Team
- 2013–2016: NetApp–Endura

Ralf Matzka (born 24 August 1989) is a German former professional cyclist, who rode professionally between 2008 and 2016.

== Career ==
As a first year professional in 2008, Matzka raced the Rund um den Henninger Turm U23 where he came fourth after being dropped from the leading group but winning the bunch sprint.

Matzka was banned by the UCI from 3 March 2016 to 27 November 2018 after testing positive for Tamoxifen. His failed test was announced by Bora–Hansgrohe in 2017 although he did not ride for them. It wasn't until January 2018 that Matzka was given a proper suspension, which was retroactively applied to his career.

== Major results ==
2008
1st Stage 4 Tour de Korea
4th Rund um den Henninger Turm U23
4th Tour de Berne
2010
1st Stage 3 Flèche du Sud
2011
2nd Road race, National Under-23 Road Championships
2012
8th Overall Course de Solidarność et des Champions Olympiques
9th Neuseen Classics
2013
10th Rund um den Finanzplatz Eschborn-Frankfurt
2014
4th Münsterland Giro
8th Brussels Cycling Classic
2015
6th Schaal Sels
