= Niels Scheuneman =

Dutch professional road bicycle racer (born 1983)

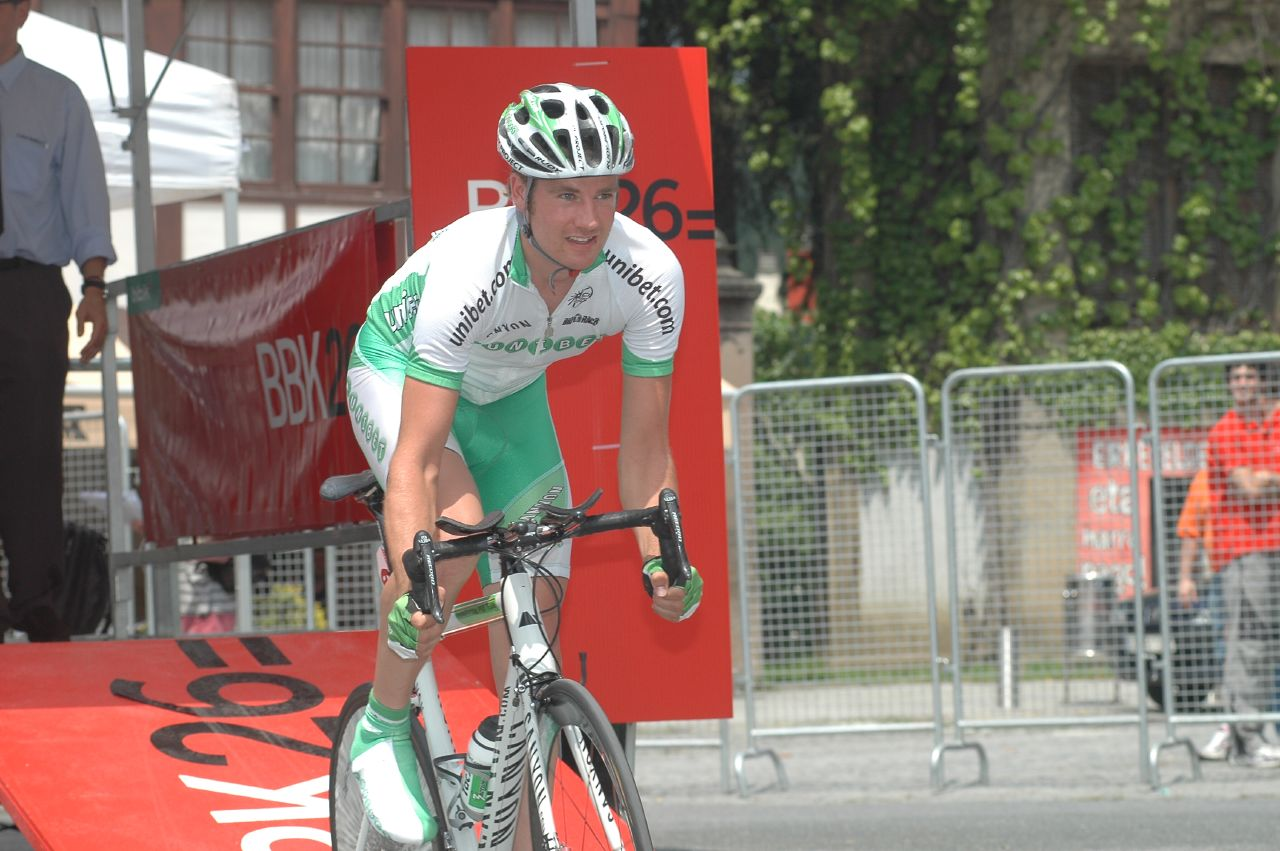

Personal information
- Full name: Niels Scheuneman
- Born: 21 December 1983 (age 42) Veendam, the Netherlands
- Height: 1.84 m (6 ft 0 in)
- Weight: 75 kg (165 lb)

Cycling career
- Sport: Cycling
- Discipline: Road
- Role: Rider

Professional teams
- 2002–2003: Rabobank GS3
- 2004: Relax–Bodysol
- 2005–2006: Rabobank
- 2007: Unibet.com
- 2008–2009: KrolStonE Continental Team

Niels Scheuneman (born 21 December 1983 in Veendam) is a Dutch former professional road bicycle racer.

== Biography ==
When Scheuneman was still a junior, won a silver and a bronze medal in the junior races of the 2001 UCI Road World Championships. In the 2003 UCI Road World Championships, he competed in the U23 category, and finished second in the time trial.

Scheuneman transferred in 2004 to the Bodysol team, to become a full professional. The Bodysol team then merged with the Relax team, and the combination competed one lever higher, which did not suit Scheuneman, and he had a bad year. At the end of the year, Scheuneman returned to the Rabobank team, where he rode as a junior.

In 2005, Scheuneman rode the 2005 Vuelta a España, his only grand tour so far. During a fall which also hurt Roberto Heras, Scheuneman broke his finger and had to abandon the race.

At the end of the 2006 season, Scheuneman's contract with Rabobank ended, and he switched to the Unibet.com team. This team was banned from most races in 2007, so Scheuneman did not race a lot. At the end of the season, he decided to retire from professional racing.

In 2008, he decided to return to racing, and joined the continental KrolStone team.

== Major results ==
2000
2nd Classique des Alpes Juniors
2001
1st Overall Grand Prix Rüebliland
1st Overall Keizer der Juniores
UCI Junior Road World Championships

2nd Road race
3rd Time trial

2nd Overall Tour de l'Abitibi
2nd Overall Grand Prix Général Patton
2nd Classique des Alpes Juniors
2002
1st Stage 2 Triptyque Ardennais
2nd Time trial, National Under-23 Road Championships
8th Time trial, UCI Under-23 Road World Championships
2003
1st Zesbergenprijs Harelbeke
2nd Time trial, UCI Under-23 Road World Championships
2nd Time trial, National Under-23 Road Championships
2nd Overall Ster Elektrotoer
3rd Overall Niedersachsen-Rundfahrt
3rd Overall Triptyque des Monts et Châteaux
4th Overall Thüringen-Rundfahrt

1st Young rider classification

4th Overall Triptyque Ardennais
2004
1st Noord-Nederland Tour (with 21 others)
9th GP Rudy Dhaenens
2005
6th Overall Tour de Luxembourg
2006
3rd LuK Challenge (with Marc Wauters)
2008
1st Stage 4 Tour du Loir-et-Cher
10th Overall Olympia's Tour
