= CK Příbram Fany Gastro =

Team information
- UCI code: PFG
- Registered: Czech Republic
- Founded: 2016
- Discipline: Road
- Status: UCI Continental (2015–2017); Club (2018–)

Key personnel
- Team manager: Marek Volf

Team name history
- 2015–: CK Příbram Fany Gastro

CK Příbram Fany Gastro (UCI team code: PFG) is a road cycling team founded in 2015 and based in the Czech Republic. It held UCI Continental from 2015 to 2017 before switching to club status in 2018.

== 2018 team roster ==
Rider	Date of birth
Martin Boubal (CZE)	15 March 1984 (age 42)
Pavel Gruber (CZE)	24 April 1996 (age 30)
Martin Hebík (CZE)	11 November 1982 (age 43)
Tomas Jakoubek (CZE)	Unknown
Jiří Kala (CZE)	21 June 1987 (age 39)

Rider	Date of birth
Karel Kuba (CZE)	2 June 1999 (age 27)
Róbert Málik (SVK)	29 November 1993 (age 32)
Vojtech Modlitba (CZE)	25 November 1996 (age 29)
Jan Pleva (CZE)	22 March 1998 (age 28)
