= Martin Hebík =

Czech bicycle racer

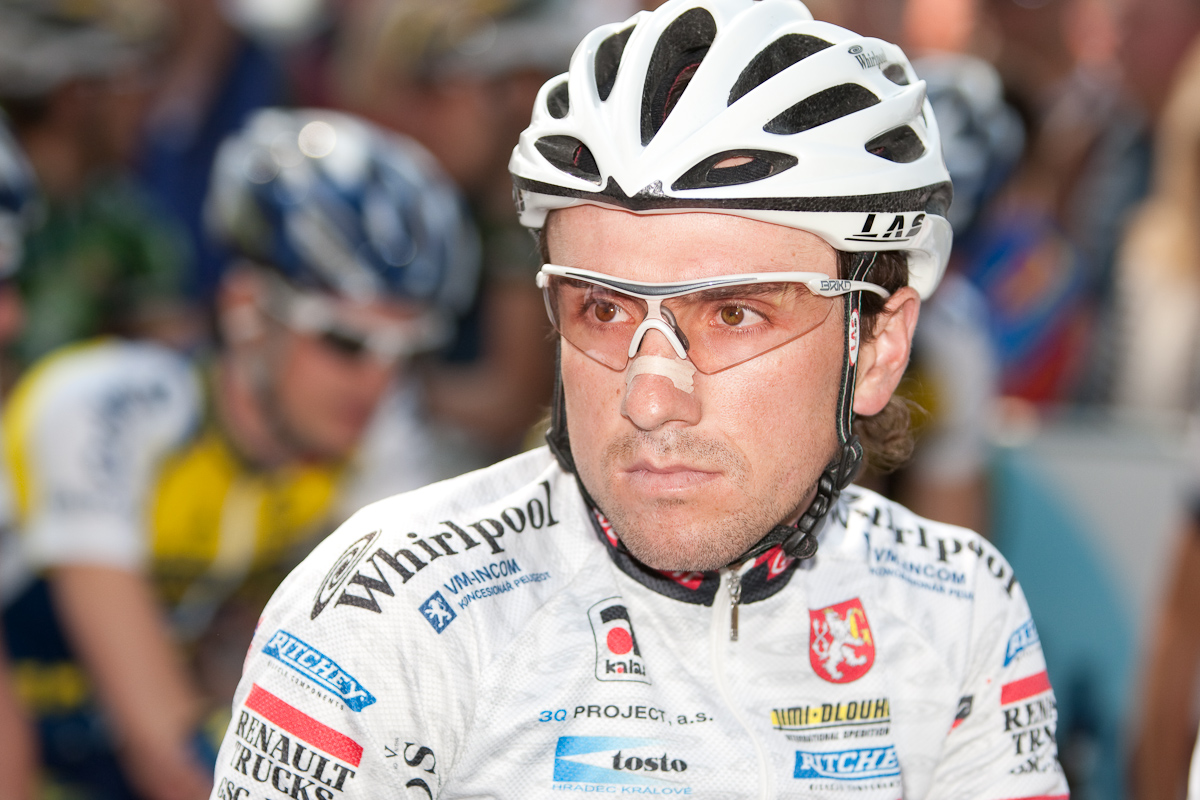
- Hebík in 2009

Personal information
- Full name: Martin Hebík
- Born: 11 November 1982 (age 43)

Cycling career
- Sport: Cycling
- Discipline: Road
- Role: Rider

Amateur team
- 2018: CK Příbram Fany Gastro

Professional team
- 2002–2006: AC Sparta Praha
- 2007: Heinz Von Heiden-Focus
- 2008: AC Sparta Praha
- 2009–2010: PSK Whirlpool–Author
- 2015–2017: CK Příbram Fany Gastro

Martin Hebík (born 11 November 1982 in České Budějovice) is a Czech cyclist, who last rode for Czech amateur team CK Příbram Fany Gastro.

== Major results ==
2004
7th Sparkassen Giro
2005
5th GP Jamp
2006
10th Tour du Jura
2007
2nd Rund um Düren
10th Rund um die Nürnberger Altstadt
2008
1st Overall Tour of Szeklerland

1st Prologue & Stage 2

2nd Road race, National Road Championships
2010
1st Prologue Dookoła Mazowsza
9th Overall Czech Cycling Tour
