= Evan Oliphant =

Scottish racing cyclist (born 1982)

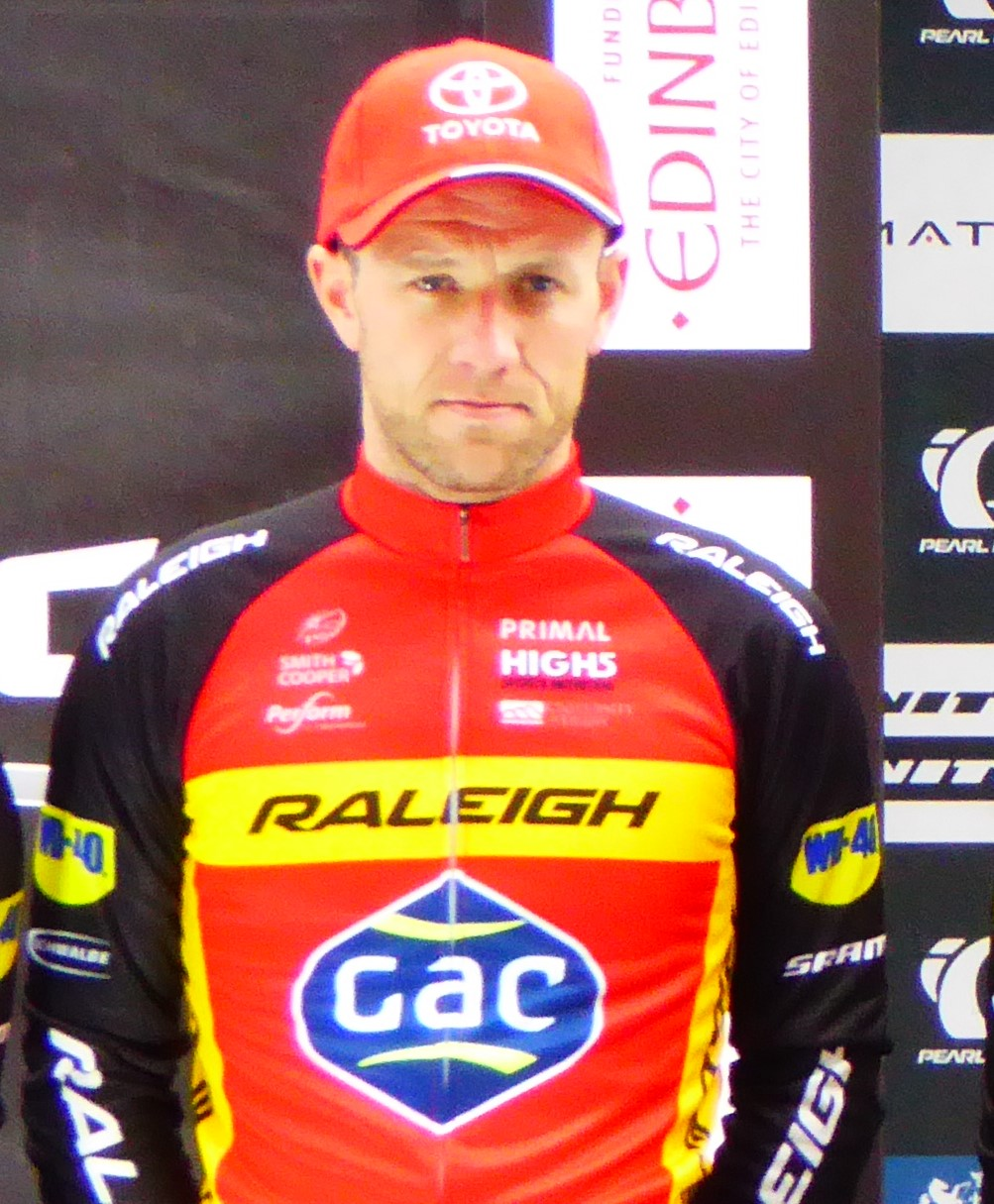
- Oliphant in 2016

Personal information
- Full name: Evan Oliphant
- Born: 8 January 1982 (age 44) Wick, Scotland, United Kingdom

Cycling career
- Sport: Cycling
- Current team: Spartans Velo Club
- Discipline: Road
- Role: Rider

Amateur teams
- 1998–2004: Recycling.co.uk Race Team
- 2017: Wheelbase CabTech Castelli
- 2019–: Spartans Velo Club

Professional teams
- 2005–2006: Recycling.co.uk–MG X-Power
- 2007: DFL–Cyclingnews–Litespeed
- 2008: Plowman Craven Racing Team
- 2009–2011: Endura Racing
- 2012–2016: Team Raleigh–GAC

Evan Oliphant (born 8 January 1982) is a Scottish bicycle racer from Wick, Caithness, who currently rides for British amateur team Spartans Velo Club.

He competed in the Under-23 road race at the 2004 UCI Road World Championships in Verona, Italy. Oliphant represented Scotland on the track and in the 2006 Commonwealth Games in Melbourne on the road.

== Major results ==
2005
1st Road race, Scottish National Road Championships
1st Warrnambool Criterium
1st East Yorkshire Classic
3rd 5 Valleys Road Race
5th Shay Elliott Memorial Race
2006
1st Overall Bay Crit Elite Criterium Series
1st Kym Smoker Memorial Track Race
3rd Road race, Scottish National Road Championships
3rd Overall Tour Wellington

1st Stage 4

4th Points race, Commonwealth Games
6th Bendigo Madison (with James McCallum)
2007
1st Road race, Scottish National Road Championships
2008
1st Road race, Scottish National Road Championships
1st Sea Otter Classic
2nd Overall Bikeline 2 Day

1st Stage 2

6th Overall Girvan Stage Race
6th Overall Tour of the Reservoir
7th Grand Prix of Wales
7th NRC Circuit Race
10th Richmond Grand Prix
2009
6th Tour of the Reservoir
8th Beaumont Trophy
2010
1st Road race, Scottish National Road Championships
Dumfries Bike Fest

4th Circuit race
6th Grand Prix

6th York Cycling City Centre Race
10th Tour of the Reservoir
2011
2nd Ryedale Grand Prix
2012
2nd Road race, Scottish National Road Championships
2013
1st Overall Premier Calendar
1st Overall Tour of the Reservoir

1st Stage 2

1st Hugh Dornan Memorial
2014
1st Road race, Scottish National Road Championships
6th Beaumont Trophy
6th Eddie Soens Memorial
7th Newport Nocturne
10th Overall Tour of the Reservoir

1st Stage 2

10th Cycle Wiltshire Grand Prix
10th Lincoln Grand Prix
10th Jersey International Road Race
2015
1st Overall British Cycling Grand Prix Series

5th Grand Prix of Wales
10th Stafford Kermesse

1st Crit on the Campus
5th Stockton Grand Prix
5th Hugh Dornan Memorial
7th Stafford GP
8th National Circuit Race Championships
8th Colne Grand Prix
9th Overall Totnes-Vire Stage Race
