= Cao Bo =

Chinese cyclist

Personal information
- Full name: Cao Bo
- Born: 14 May 1992 (age 34)

Cycling career
- Sport: Cycling
- Disciplines: Track; Road
- Role: Rider
- Rider type: Pursuitist (track)

Professional teams
- 2013: China Hainan Yindongli
- 2016: China Hainan Sports Lottery–Yindongli
- 2017–2018: Yunnan Lvshan Landscape–Taishan Pardus

Cao Bo (born 14 May 1992) is a Chinese road and track cyclist, who last rode for UCI Continental team Yunnan Lvshan Landscape. He competed in the team pursuit event at the 2013 UCI Track Cycling World Championships.
