= Ciervo Nara Merida Cycling Team =

Japanese cycling team

Team information
- Registered: Japan
- Founded: 2010
- Discipline: Road
- Status: National (2010–2012); UCI Continental (2013–2014); National (2015– )

Team name history
- 2016– 2015 2014 2013 2011: Ciervo Nara Miyata-Merida Racing Team; Ciervo Nara Miyata-Merida Cycling Team; Ciervo Nara Merida Cycling Team; Ciervo Nara Cycling Team; Ciervo Nara Pro Cycling Team

Ciervo Nara Merida Cycling Team is a Japanese cycling team established in 2010. It was registered as UCI Continental in 2013–2014.
