= DFL–Cyclingnews–Litespeed =

British professional cycling team

Team Cyclingnews.com–Down Under
Team information
- Registered: United Kingdom
- Founded: 2001
- Disbanded: 2009
- Discipline: Road
- Status: UCI Continental

Key personnel
- General manager: Nick Collins
- Team manager: Rudi Dubois

Team name history
- 2001–2003 2004 2005 2006–2007 2008: Team Down Under; Team cyclingnews.com-Down Under; Team Cyclingnews.com Fondriest; DFL-Cyclingnews–Litespeed; Pedaltech-Cyclingnews

Team DFL–Cyclingnews–Litespeed was a British professional cycling team that rode UCI Continental Circuits races.

== 2007 Season ==
The team leader for 2007 was Belgian Nico Mattan and the squad included 2006 British champion Hamish Haynes, reigning Finnish National Time Trial champion Matti Helminen and English rider Daniel Lloyd. Eric Vanderaerden was a directeur sportif.

In what was a disappointing season, Lloyd scored the team's best general classification result with his second-place overall finish at the Tour of Qinghai Lake. Cameron Jennings won a stage of the Jayco Herald Sun Tour, Helminen retained the Finnish National Time Trial Championship and Jeremy Vennell was victorious on stages five and six of the Powernet Tour of Southland to give DFL four professional victories for the season.

Mattan in particular had an underwhelming season, his only ranking points of the year coming via a 78th-place finish at Gent–Wevelgem. The former Gent–Wevelgem and two-time Paris-Nice stage winner finished outside the top 2000 in the professional rider rankings and would retire at the end of the season.

Daniel Lloyd was the highest rated member of the squad in 2007, finishing a creditable 329th in the end of season PCS rankings.

== Team closure ==
In 2008 it wanted to become a professional continental team under the name Pedaltech-Cyclingnews and signed Steffen Wesemann and Bas Giling. It also had an agreement with Marc Lotz but Pedaltech signed two British professionals instead. Top performers Lloyd and Helminen left the team, joining An Post–M.Donnelly–Grant Thornton–Sean Kelly and Palmans–Cras respectively for 2008.

The UCI did not give the team the professional continental licence. Potential sponsors pulled out, including bike supplier Museeuw Bicycles and Cyclingnews.com, after which the team was to be known as Pedaltech Pro Cycling Team. Then the team manager, who was its owner, announced they had secondary cancer and could not run the team. It collapsed.

== Team roster ==
Rider	Date of birth
Bjorn Cornelissen (NED)	3 June 1976 (age 50)
Sven de Weerdt (BEL)	29 March 1978 (age 48)
Dan Fleeman (GBR)	3 October 1982 (age 43)
David Harrigan (AUS)	26 May 1975 (age 51)
Hamish Haynes (GBR)	5 March 1974 (age 52)
Matti Helminen (FIN)	14 August 1975 (age 51)
Cameron Jennings (AUS)	27 April 1970 (age 56)
Daniel Lloyd (GBR)	11 August 1980 (age 46)
Nico Mattan (BEL)	17 July 1971 (age 55)

Rider	Date of birth
Robby Meul (BEL)	4 September 1981 (age 45)
Jens Mouris (NED)	12 March 1980 (age 46)
Kane Oakley (AUS)	4 October 1976 (age 49)
Evan Oliphant (GBR)	8 January 1982 (age 44)
Rhys Pollock (AUS)	14 March 1980 (age 46)
Bernard Sulzberger (AUS)	5 December 1983 (age 42)
Gert Vanderaerden (BEL)	23 January 1973 (age 53)
Jeremy Vennell (NZL)	6 October 1980 (age 45)
Juan Pablo Wilches Rodriguez (COL)	22 January 1982 (age 44)

== Former riders ==
- Russell Downing (2006) - Former British Champion
- Matthew Wilson (2001)
