= China Hainan Sports Lottery–Yindongli =

Chinese cycling team

China Yindonli-Wildto Cycling Team
Team information
- UCI code: YDL
- Registered: China
- Founded: 2013
- Disbanded: 2017
- Discipline: Road
- Status: UCI Continental

Team name history
- 2013 2014 2015 2016: China Hainan Yindongli; China Hainan HNB Yindongli; China Yindongli Hainan–Wildto; China Hainan Sports Lottery–Yindongli

China Yindonli–Wildto Cycling Team was a Chinese UCI Continental cycling team established in 2013.

== 2016 Team roster ==
As of December 2016.

Rider	Date of birth
Cao Bo (CHN)	14 May 1992 (aged 24)
Gao Peng (CHN)	31 December 1993 (aged 23)
Li Guanghui (CHN)	4 November 1995 (aged 21)
Li Jiamin (CHN)	7 January 1993 (aged 23)
Li Jinsong (CHN)	26 April 1997 (aged 19)

Rider	Date of birth
Liu Jiankun (CHN)	21 June 1995 (aged 21)
Liu Ye (CHN)	18 August 1995 (aged 21)
Niu Yikui (CHN)	2 August 1994 (aged 22)
Song Anping (CHN)	7 May 1995 (aged 21)
Yan Zhipeng (CHN)	9 July 1995 (aged 21)
