= C Project =

Team information
- Registered: Japan
- Founded: 2012
- Discipline: Road
- Status: UCI Continental (2013–2014)

Team name history
- 2012 2013–2014: Cannondale Spacezeropoint; C Project

C Project is a Japanese UCI Continental cycling team established in 2012.

== National champions ==
2013
Japan Time Trial Champion, Masatoshi Oba
