= Team Frøy–Bianchi =

Team Frøy-Bianchi
Team information
- UCI code: FRB
- Registered: Norway
- Founded: 2012
- Disbanded: 2015
- Discipline: Road
- Status: Continental

Key personnel
- General manager: Espen Hillmann
- Team manager: Carl Erik Pedersen

Team name history
- 2012 2013–2015: Team Frøy-Trek; Team Frøy-Bianchi

Team Frøy–Bianchi (UCI team code: FRB) was a UCI Continental cycling team based in Norway. The team was managed by Espen Hillmann with assistance from directeur sportif Carl Erik Pedersen and Pål Gulliksen. The team disbanded at the end of the 2015 season after failing to find a new main sponsor.

== Team roster ==
As of May 3, 2015.

Rider	Date of birth
Oddbjørn Andersen (NOR)	30 September 1990 (age 35)
Jon Breivold (NOR)	19 February 1995 (age 31)
Henrik Evensen (NOR)	17 November 1994 (age 31)
Kristian Forbord (NOR)	30 June 1988 (age 38)
Damien Garcia (FRA)	17 April 1992 (age 34)
Henrik Haugen (NOR)	27 June 1992 (age 34)

Rider	Date of birth
Anders Kristoffersen (NOR)	27 March 1993 (age 33)
Nikolai Lunder (NOR)	12 October 1994 (age 31)
Anders Oddli (NOR)	22 April 1994 (age 32)
Anders Røe (NOR)	13 September 1993 (age 32)
Halvor Tandrevold (NOR)	28 March 1992 (age 34)
