= Plowman Craven–Madison.co.uk =

British cycle racing team

madison.co.uk
Team information
- Registered: United Kingdom
- Founded: 2006
- Disciplines: Road, Track and Cyclo Cross

Key personnel
- Team manager: Garry Beckett

Team name history
- 2008 Jan 2009 – June 2009 June 2009–: Plowman Craven Evans Cycles; Plowman Craven–Madison.co.uk; Madison.co.uk

Madison.co.uk are a British professional cycle racing team. At the beginning of 2009, they were known as Plowman Craven–Madison.co.uk and were a UCI Continental bicycle racing team.

== History ==
Sponsored by geomatics company Plowman Craven in its inaugural season, the team won three National and one World title with Malcolm Elliot also taking the Elite Circuit Race Series. UK bicycle retailer Evans Cycles became a title sponsor after the first year to launch their own brand Pinnacle Bikes range. Evans Cycles then pulled out of the sponsorship after the first year of sponsorship.

The team's focus is senior professional events in the United Kingdom and second-tier road races such as the UCI Europe Tour.

PCA was among the first professional cycling teams to introduce "doping passports" to prevent blood doping in cycling when it launched its Race Clean initiative before to the 2007 Tour of Britain.

== 2006 riders ==
- Kevin Barclay
- Brian Biggs
- Michael Lloyd
- Simon Gaywood
- Tony Gibb
- Fredrik Johansson
- James McCallum
- Gordon McCauley
- James Millard
- Adam Norris
- Graeme Gibbs
- James Taylor
- Chris Badger

== 2007 riders ==
- Tony Gibb
- Gordon McCauley
- James Taylor
- Simon Gaywood
- Michael Lloyd
- James McCullum
- James Millard
- Graeme Gibbs
- Richard Wilkinson
- Freddy Johansson
- Adam Norris
- Brian Biggs
- Jason Allen
- Kevin Barclay

== 2008 riders ==
- Tom Barras
- Neil Coleman
- Simon Gaywood
- Tony Gibb
- Alex Higham
- James Jackson
- James McCallum
- Craig MacLean
- James Millard
- Evan Oliphant
- Simon Richardson

== Equipment ==
For the 2007 the Plowman Craven Evans Cycles race team were supplied bicycles by Pinnacle Bikes, a bicycle brand established by cycle retailer Evans Cycles.

For 2008 the team rode Pinnacle Bikes, namely Pinnacle Aeos Carbon Team Issue carbon fibre bikes, designed in the UK, and painted in matching team Pink & Blue colours. The team also tested new track and time trial models ready for consumer sale in the future. However these models didn't make it to market due to poor quality issues. Due to the quality issues, some riders used re-badged bikes from other manufacturers. Each rider was free to choose their own shoes and saddle from the ranges stocked by Evans Cycles.

In 2009 the team decided to end the co-ownership with bicycle retailer Evans Cycles. A new deal was struck with distribution company madison.co.uk. In May 2009, Plowman Craven withdrew their sponsorship of the team. The team lost a number of riders including Evan Oliphant and Ross Creber. The team became known as simply madison.co.uk.
