= KrolStonE Continental Team =

Cycling team

Team information
- UCI code: KST
- Registered: Netherlands
- Founded: 2006
- Disbanded: 2009
- Discipline: Road
- Status: Continental

Key personnel
- Team manager: Rudi Nagengast

Team name history
- 2006–2009: KrolStonE Continental Team

KrolStonE Continental Team was a Dutch UCI Continental team that existed from 2006 until 2009. It nurtured future professionals such as Lieuwe Westra, Pim Ligthart, and Bert-Jan Lindeman.

== Final roster ==
As of 31 December 2009

Rider	Date of birth
Marcel Beima (NED)	25 November 1983 (aged 26)
Sjoerd Botter (NED)	26 September 1984 (aged 25)
Ivor Bruin (NED)	3 November 1980 (aged 29)
Luc Hagenaars (NED)	27 July 1987 (aged 22)
Jasper Lenferink (NED)	2 December 1982 (aged 27)
Bert-Jan Lindeman (NED)	16 June 1989 (aged 20)

Rider	Date of birth
Jos Pronk (NED)	13 January 1983 (aged 26)
Niels Scheuneman (NED)	21 December 1983 (aged 26)
Paul Sneeboer (NED)	23 September 1980 (aged 29)
Ger Soepenberg (NED)	1 May 1983 (aged 26)
Fulco van Gulik (NED)	1 August 1979 (aged 30)

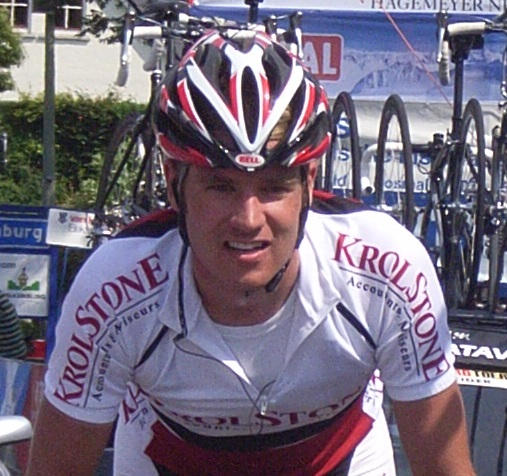
Cyclist Scheuneman in the Ster Electrotour 2008

== Major wins ==
2007
ZLM Tour, Ismaël Kip
Stage 2 (ITT) OZ Wielerweekend, Lieuwe Westra
2008
Tour du Loir-et-Cher

Stages 1 & 5, Jos Pronk
Stage 4, Niels Scheuneman

Stage 5 Olympia's Tour, Jos Pronk
Stage 1 Tour Alsace, Lieuwe Westra
