= Motiv3 Pro-Cycling Team =

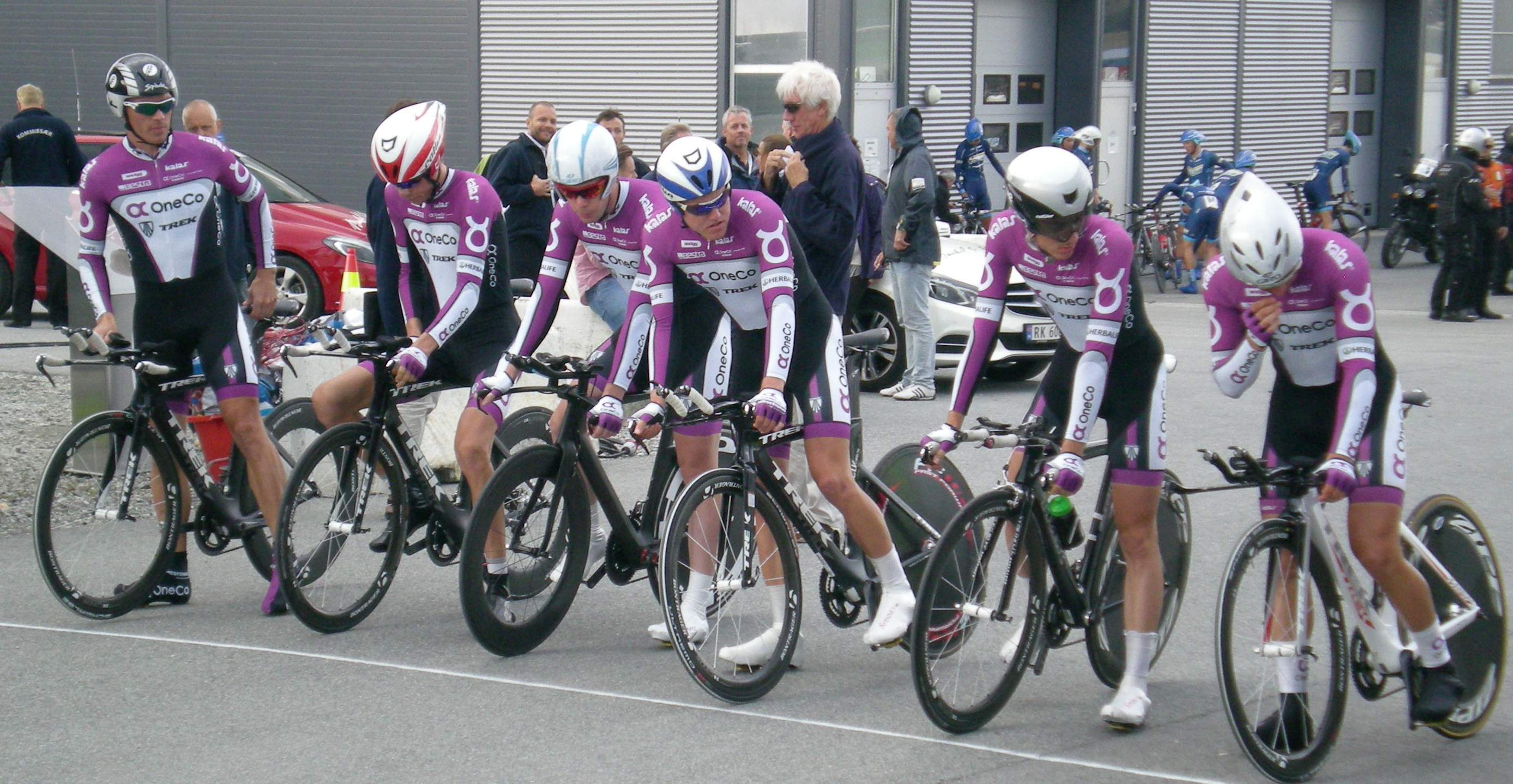

Team information
- UCI code: MPC
- Registered: Norway
- Founded: 2012
- Disbanded: 2014
- Discipline: Road
- Status: UCI Continental (2012–2014); Amateur (2014)

Team name history
- 2012 2013 2013 2014: OneCo–Mesterhus; OneCo–Trek; OneCo; Motiv3 Pro-Cycling Team

The Motiv3 Pro-Cycling Team was a Norwegian UCI Continental cycling team that existed from 2012 until 2014. On July 31, 2014, the team lost its UCI Continental status, and was a club team until its disappearance at the end of the season.

== Major wins ==
2012
Prologue Sibiu Cycling Tour, Jon Bergsland
