= Clube DataRo de Ciclismo =

Brazilian cycling team

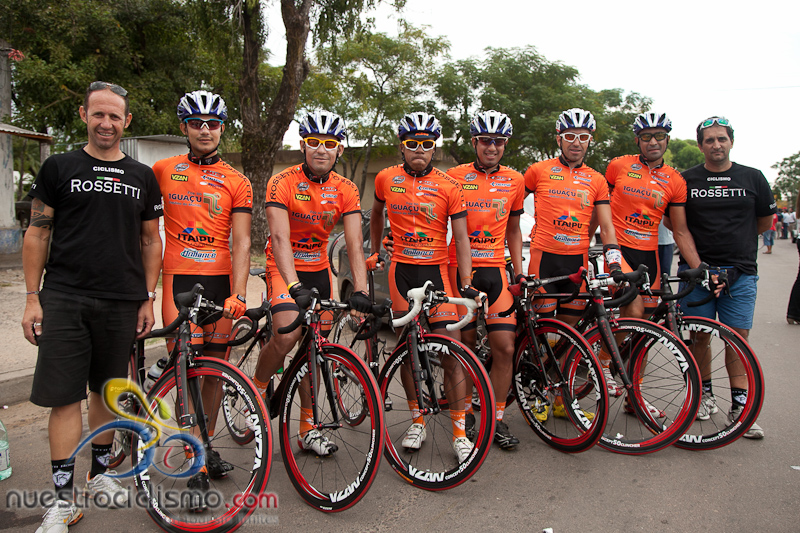

Team information
- UCI code: DAT
- Registered: Brazil
- Founded: 2010
- Discipline: Road
- Status: Amateur (2000–2010); UCI Continental (2011–2014)
- Website: Team home page

Key personnel
- General manager: Ricardo Fagundes
- Team manager: Hernandes Quadri

Team name history
- 2010 2011–2012 2013 2014 2015 2016: Clube DataRo de Ciclismo; Clube DataRo de Ciclismo–Foz do Iguaçu; Clube DataRo de Ciclismo; Clube DataRo de Ciclismo–Bottecchia; DataRo Brazil; Clube Dataro de Ciclismo–Gigantech

Clube DataRo de Ciclismo was a Brazilian UCI Continental cycling team that existed from 2000 to 2010 as an amateur team and Continental from 2011 until 2014. The team returned to the amateur ranks in 2015.
