= Holy Brother Cycling Team =

Team information
- UCI code: HBT
- Registered: China
- Founded: 2010
- Disbanded: 2018
- Discipline: Road
- Status: UCI Continental (2010–2017)

Team name history
- 2010–2017: Holy Brother Cycling Team

Holy Brother Cycling Team was a Chinese UCI Continental cycling team established in 2010.

== 2017 Team roster ==
Rider	Date of birth
Chen Libin (CHN)	7 October 1986 (aged 31)
Qiao Yulei (CHN)	7 March 1998 (aged 19)
Wang Fengnian (CHN)	16 June 1992 (aged 25)
Wang Zhonghui (CHN)	23 August 1997 (aged 20)

Rider	Date of birth
Xu Yulong (CHN)	14 April 1993 (aged 24)
Yang Haoran (CHN)	23 February 1998 (aged 19)
Yang Yiming (CHN)	23 January 1997 (aged 20)
Yue Hao (CHN)	26 November 1992 (aged 25)

== Major wins ==
2011
Stage 6a Tour of Singkarak, Yiming Zhao

== National champions ==
2015
China Road Race Champion, Fengnian Wang
