= Price Your Bike =

Team information
- UCI code: PYB
- Registered: Switzerland
- Founded: 2006
- Disbanded: 2011
- Discipline: Road
- Status: UCI Continental
- Bicycles: Bottecchia

Key personnel
- General manager: Daniel Hirs
- Team managers: Matthias Blumer; Guliano Donato; Rodrigo González; Mathias Örtle; René Pfyffe

Team name history
- 2006–2007 2008 2009 2010 2011: Hadimec; Hadimec–Nazionale Elettronica; Nazionale Elettronica New Slot–Hadimec; Price–Custom Bikes; Price Your Bike

Price Your Bike was a Swiss UCI Continental cycling team that existed from 2006 to 2011.
