= Seoul Cycling Team =

South Korean cycling team

Team information
- UCI code: SCT
- Registered: South Korea
- Founded: 2008
- Discipline: Road
- Status: UCI Continental

Key personnel
- General manager: Cho Ho-sung
- Team manager: Ku Bon-jae

Team name history
- 2008–: Seoul Cycling Team

Seoul Cycling Team is a South Korean UCI Continental cycling team established in 2008.

== Team roster ==
As of 24 February 2021.

Rider	Date of birth
Bae Hyeong-jun (KOR)	27 June 2002 (age 24)
Joo Mi-deum (KOR)	8 July 1999 (age 27)
Jun Hoon-min (KOR)	8 July 1999 (age 27)
Jung Woo-ho (KOR)	17 November 1997 (age 28)
Kim Ji-hun (KOR)	21 November 1994 (age 31)
Kim Ki-hoon (KOR)	5 March 1998 (age 28)

Rider	Date of birth
Kim Tae-hyung (KOR)	21 March 2000 (age 26)
Kim Woo-sol (KOR)	14 April 2001 (age 25)
Lee Jeong-hoon (KOR)	3 January 2001 (age 25)
Min Kyeong-ho (KOR)	25 July 1996 (age 30)
Park Seong-joon (KOR)	12 December 2000 (age 25)
Park Young-kyun (KOR)	15 February 2001 (age 25)

== Major wins ==
2010
Stages 3 & 5 Tour de Korea, Seon Ho Park
Stages 6 & 9 Tour de Korea, Hyo Suk Gong
2011
Stages 3, 4 & 6 Tour of Thailand, Ho Sung Cho
2012
Stage 5 Tour of Thailand, Joon Yong Seo
2013
Stages 3 & 5 Tour of Thailand, Ho Sung Cho
Stage 7 Tour de Korea, Ho Sung Cho
2014
Stage 2 Tour de Korea, Jun-oh Kwon
Stage 4 Tour of Thailand, Ki Seok Lee
2015
Asian Continental U23 Time Trial championships, Sang-hoon Park
2016
Stage 6 Tour of Thailand, Ok Cheol Kim
Stage 2 Tour of Fuzhou, Ok Cheol Kim
2017
Overall Tour de Korea Kyeongho Min

Young rider classification Kyeongho Min
Stage 2, Kyeongho Min
