= Thüringer Energie Team =

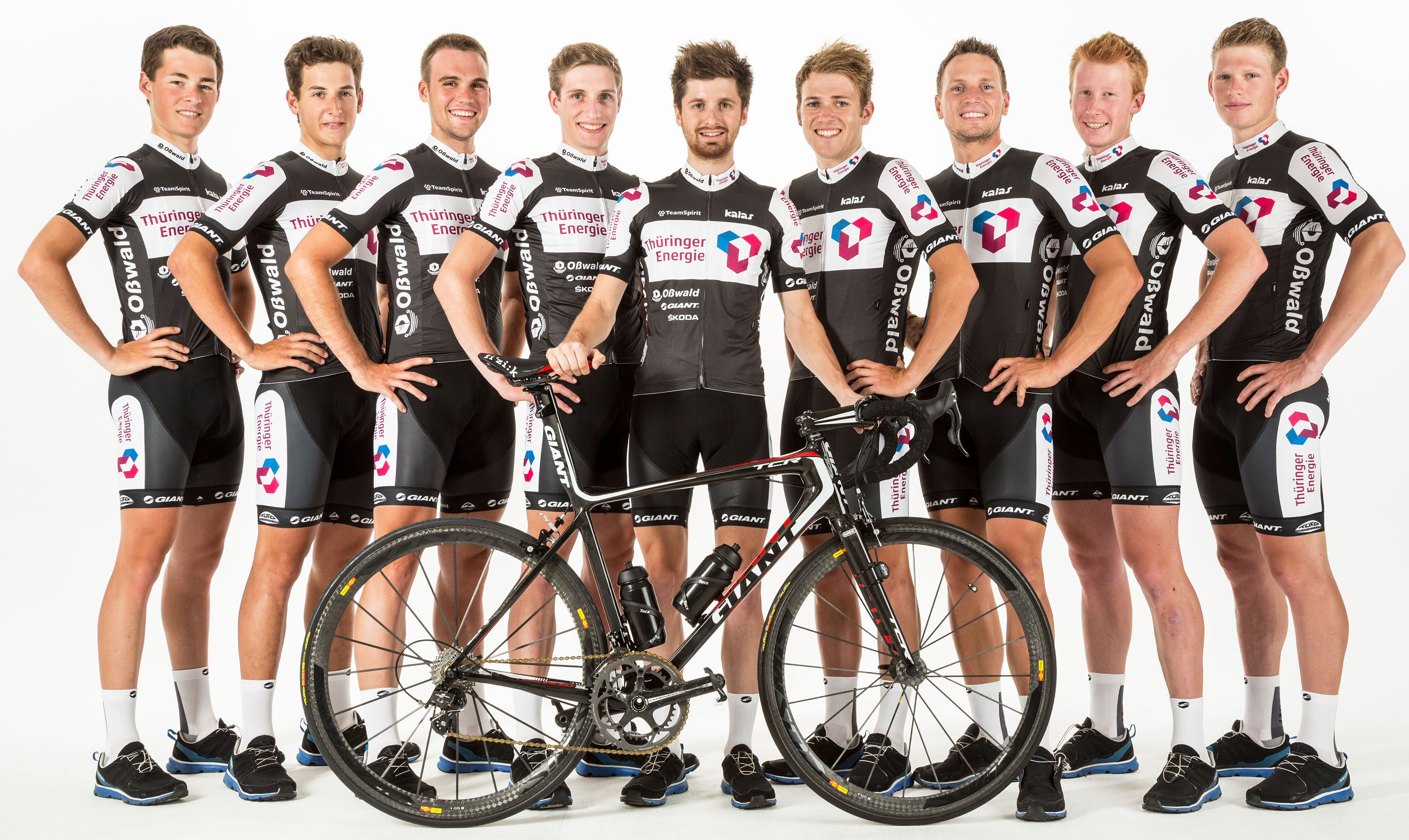
- The team in 2013

Team information
- UCI code: TET
- Registered: Germany
- Founded: 2006
- Disbanded: 2013
- Discipline: Road
- Status: UCI Continental

Key personnel
- General manager: Jörg Werner
- Team managers: Stephan Schreck; Sebastian May; Ralf-Rüdiger Falk; Kati Lang; Jens Lang; Matthias Nack

Team name history
- 2006–2013: Thüringer Energie Team

The Thüringer Energie Team was a German UCI Continental cycling team that existed from 2006 to 2013.

Many famous cyclists such as Marcel Kittel, Tony Martin, John Degenkolb, Maximilian Schachmann, and Jasha Sütterlin rode for the team.
