= Team Heizomat =

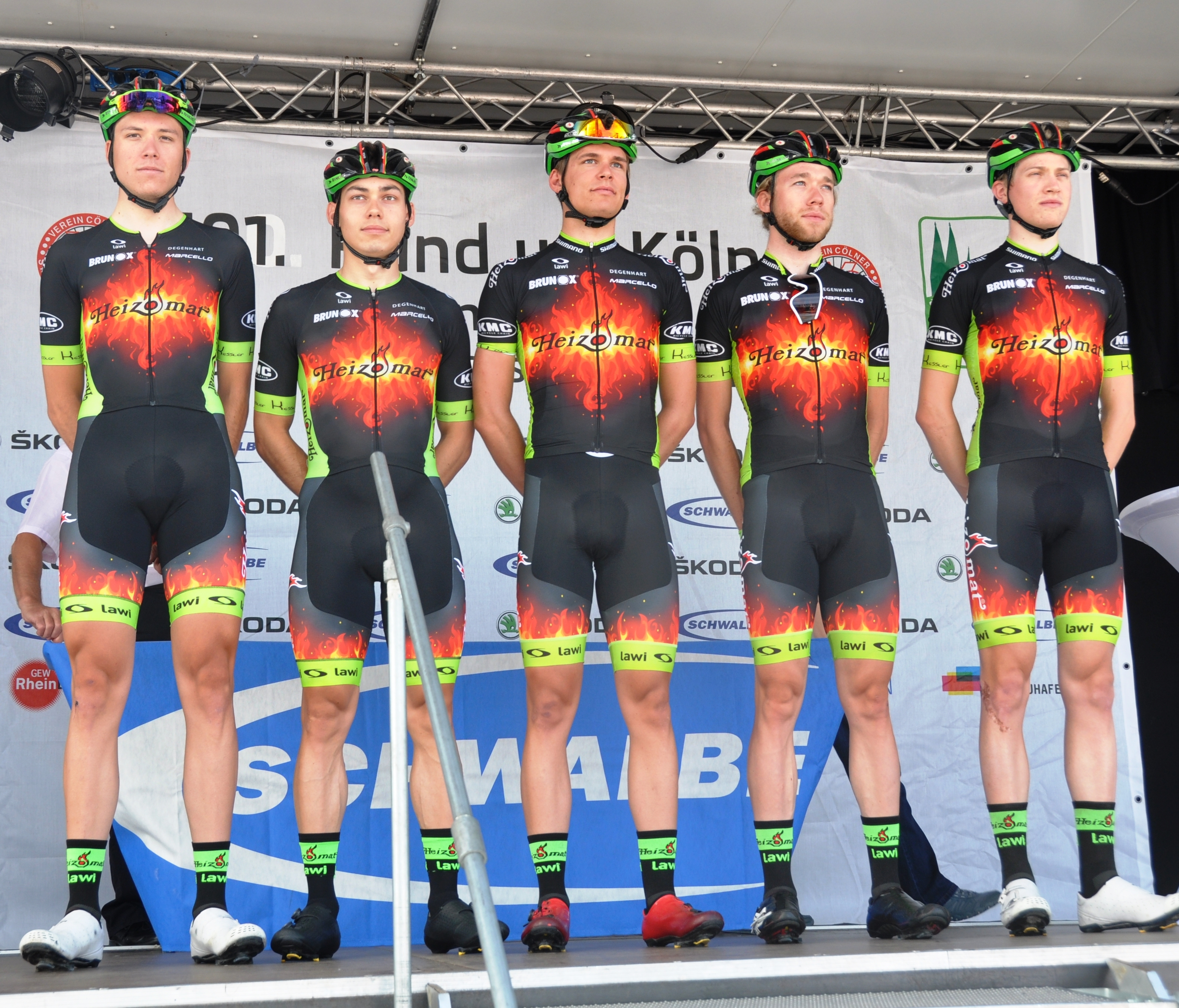
- The team in 2017

Team information
- UCI code: THF
- Registered: Germany
- Founded: 2008
- Disbanded: 2017
- Discipline: Road
- Status: Continental
- Bicycles: Marcello
- Website: Team home page

Key personnel
- General manager: Markus Schleicher

Team name history
- 2008 2009 2010 2011–2017: Team Mapei–Heizomat (TMH); Heizomat–Mapei (TMH); Heizomat (THF); Team Heizomat (THF)
Jersey

Team Heizomat Rad-Net (UCI team code: THF) was a UCI Continental team founded in 2008 and based in Motten, Germany. It participates in UCI Continental Circuits races. For the 2018 season Team Heizomat, managed by Sportagentur Markus Schleicher GmbH, merged with Rad-Net Rose Team.

== Team roster ==
Rider	Date of birth
Johannes Adamietz (GER)	24 May 1998 (age 28)
Georg Loef (GER)	22 June 1994 (age 32)
Dorian Lübbers (GER)	4 February 1997 (age 29)
Nathan Müller (GER)	16 April 1995 (age 31)
Manuel Porzner (GER)	25 February 1996 (age 30)
Jonas Rapp (GER)	16 July 1994 (age 32)
Simon Redmers (GER)	30 April 1996 (age 30)
Pascal Treubel (GER)	14 February 1997 (age 29)
Laurin Winter (GER)	4 September 1996 (age 30)

== Major wins ==
2008
Stage 3 Rothaus Regio-Tour, Robert Retschke
2009
Points classification Internationale Mainfrankentour, Sebastian Hans

Mountains classification, Nils Plötner
Stage 1, Sebastian Hans

2010
Stage 3 Flèche du Sud, Ralf Matzka
