= Giant Cycling Team =

Chinese cycling team

Team information
- UCI code: MSS
- Registered: China
- Founded: 2009
- Discipline: Road
- Status: UCI Continental

Key personnel
- General manager: Wu Jufang
- Team managers: Song Guoqiang; He Yongyu; Youli Fang

Team name history
- 2009–2013 2014–2016 2017–: MAX Success Sports; Giant–Champion System Pro Cycling; Giant Cycling Team

Giant Cycling Team is a Chinese UCI Continental cycling team established in 2009.

== Team roster ==
As of 6 September 2023.

Rider	Date of birth
Deng Penghai (CHN)	26 April 1998 (age 28)
Hu Haojun (CHN)	31 January 2001 (age 25)
Huang Junlei (CHN)	2 March 2002 (age 24)
Lin Chuanyang (CHN)	2 November 2002 (age 23)
Lu Jiacheng (CHN)	13 September 2001 (age 24)
Lyu Neng (CHN)	30 June 2004 (age 22)

Rider	Date of birth
Wang Yan (CHN)	14 August 2002 (age 24)
Wang Zichen (CHN)	7 March 2000 (age 26)
Wu Junjie (CHN)	22 December 2002 (age 23)
Zhang Haiao (CHN)	23 December 2000 (age 25)
Zhou Wenjun (CHN)	28 September 2001 (age 24)

== Major wins ==
2011
Stage 3 Tour de Korea, Xu Gang
2012
Overall Tour of Vietnam, Huang En
2013
Stage 3 Tour de Korea, Liu Hao
2014
China National Time Trial championships, Nan Wu
2015
China National Time Trial championships, Nan Wu
2019
China National Time Trial championships, Shi Hang
