= Gebrüder Weiss–Oberndorfer =

Gebrüder Weiss-Oberndorfer
Team information
- UCI code: KTM
- Registered: Austria
- Founded: 2008
- Discipline: Road
- Status: Continental

Key personnel
- Team manager: Oskar Hauser

Team name history
- 2008 2009 2010 2011–2013 2014–: Arbö–KTM–Junkers; KTM–Junkers; Arbö KTM–Gebrüder Weiss; Arbö–Gebrüder Weiss–Oberndorfer; Gebrüder Weiss–Oberndorfer

Gebrüder Weiss–Oberndorfer (UCI team code: GWO) is a continental cycling team founded in 2008. It is based in Austria and it participates in UCI Continental Circuits races.

== Team roster ==
As of 6 March 2014.

Rider	Date of birth
Benjamin Edmüller (GER)	8 August 1987 (age 39)
Gregor Gazvoda (SLO)	15 October 1981 (age 44)
Michael Gogl (AUT)	4 November 1993 (age 32)
Alexander Holzinger (AUT)	1 October 1995 (age 30)
Benedikt Kendler (GER)	9 October 1992 (age 33)
Tomáš Koudela (CZE)	1 April 1992 (age 34)
Jakub Kratochvila (CZE)	26 August 1988 (age 38)

Rider	Date of birth
Maximilian Kuen (AUT)	26 May 1992 (age 34)
Petr Lechner (CZE)	14 March 1984 (age 42)
Alexander Meier (GER)	28 January 1992 (age 34)
Lukas Meiler (GER)	14 February 1995 (age 31)
Andreas Müller (AUT)	25 November 1979 (age 46)
Lukas Ranacher (AUT)	25 August 1992 (age 34)
Daniel Reiter (AUT)	13 July 1991 (age 35)

== Major wins ==
2009
Stage 4 Tour of Austria, Jan Bárta
2010
Slovenia time trial championships, Gregor Gazvoda
Stage 2 Tour of Qinghai Lake, Gregor Gazvoda
2011
Overall Tour of Szeklerland, Florian Bissinger

Stage 2, Florian Bissinger

2014
Stage 4 Grand Prix of Sochi, Michael Gogl
Slovenia time trial championships, Gregor Gazvoda
