= AC Sparta Praha (cycling team) =

Czech cycling team

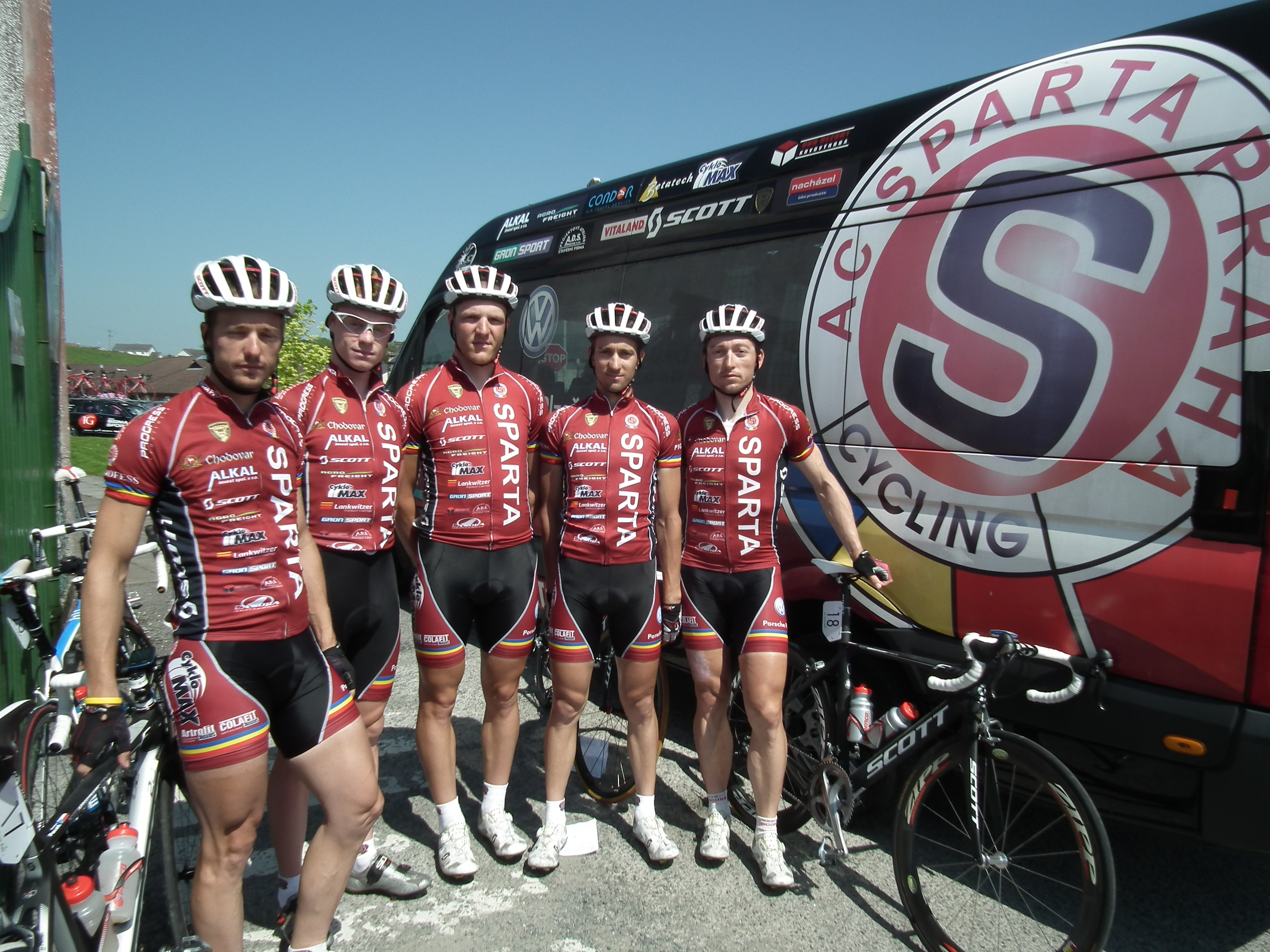

Team information
- UCI code: ACS
- Registered: Czech Republic
- Founded: 2002
- Discipline: Road
- Status: UCI Continental (2005–2020); Club (2021–)

Key personnel
- Team manager: Zdeněk Rubáš

Team name history
- 2002–: AC Sparta Praha

AC Sparta Praha (UCI team code: ACS) is a Czech cycling team recognized by the UCI since 2002: it started as a third division team, then becoming a Continental team, and a club team in 2021.

== Team roster ==
As of 10 September 2021.

Rider	Date of birth
Richard Habermann (CZE)	29 March 1999 (age 27)
Dominik Horák (CZE)	12 July 2001 (age 25)
Martin Kohout (CZE)	28 September 1999 (age 26)
Rostislav Krotký (CZE)	19 October 1976 (age 49)
Michał Pustuła (POL)	30 March 1999 (age 27)

Rider	Date of birth
Jan Ryba (CZE)	25 March 1995 (age 31)
Michal Schuran (CZE)	30 June 1996 (age 30)
Oscar Uhlig (GER)	30 April 2000 (age 26)
Martin Volf (CZE)	30 July 2002 (age 24)

== Major wins ==
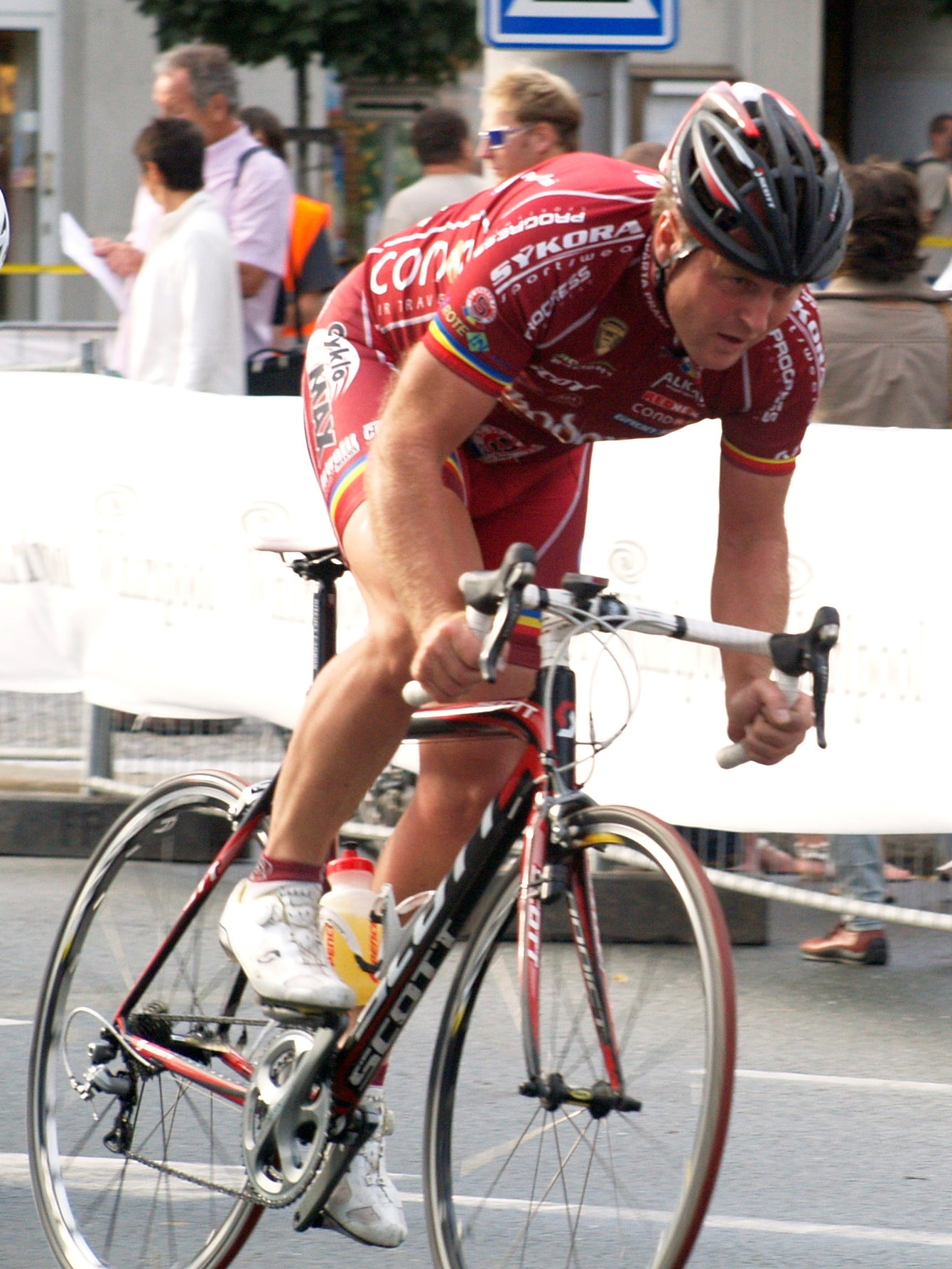
Directeur sportif Zdeněk Rubáš

2003
Stage 2 Ringerike GP, Richard Faltus
Prologue & Stage 1 Bohemia Tour, Richard Faltus
2008
Overall Tour of Szeklerland, Martin Hebík

Prologue & Stage 2, Martin Hebík
Stage 1, Rostislav Krotký

2009
Stage 6 Tour de Serbie, Nebojša Jovanović
GP Bradlo, Nebojša Jovanović
2013
Stage 7 Rás Tailteann, Tomáš Okrouhlický
