= Remco (given name) =

Remco or Remko is a Dutch masculine given name, traditionally from Groningen. It is related to the West Frisian name Remme, which itself has an unclear, possibly Germanic origin.

People with the name include:

- Remco Boere (born 1961), Dutch footballer
- Remco Bosma (born 1971), Dutch VVD politician
- Remco te Brake (born 1988), Dutch cyclist
- Remco Campert (1929–2022), Dutch author, poet and columnist
- Remco Dijkstra (born 1972), Dutch VVD politician
- Remco Evenepoel (born 2000), Belgian cyclist
- Remco van Eijden (born 1977), Dutch darts player
- Remco de Fouw (born 1962), Irish sculptor
- Remco Olde Heuvel (born 1983), Dutch speed skater
- Remco Pardoel (born 1969), Dutch mixed martial artist
- Remco Pielstroom (born 1965), Dutch water polo player
- Remco van der Schaaf (born 1979), Dutch footballer
- Remco Torenbosch (born 1982), Dutch visual artist
- Remco van Wijk (born 1972), Dutch field hockey player
- Remko Bicentini (born 1968), Dutch-Curaçaoan football player and manager
- Remko Pasveer (born 1983), Dutch football goalkeeper
- Remko Scha (1945–2015), Dutch computer scientist, logician and composer

== See also ==
- Remco, American toy company between the 1940s and 1990s
- RemCo, Remuneration Committee on a board of directors
