= 2015 World Ports Classic =

2015 UCI Europe Tour

Race details
- Dates: 23–24 May 2015
- Stages: 2
- Distance: 359 km (223.1 mi)
- Winning time: 7h 32' 48"

Results
Jersey awarded to the overall winner	Winner	Kris Boeckmans (BEL)	(Lotto–Soudal)
	Second	Danilo Napolitano (ITA)	(Wanty–Groupe Gobert)
	Third	Yauheni Hutarovich (BLR)	(Bretagne–Séché Environnement)
Jersey awarded to the points classification winner	Points	Kris Boeckmans (BEL)	(Lotto–Soudal)
Jersey awarded to the youth classification winner	Youth	Rudy Barbier (FRA)	(Roubaix–Lille Métropole)
	Team	Lotto–Soudal	

The 2015 World Ports Classic was the fourth and final edition of the World Ports Classic cycle stage race. It was part of the 2015 UCI Europe Tour as a 2.1 event. As the previous editions, it consisted of two stages: the first one from Rotterdam to Antwerp was won by Astana's Andrea Guardini, and the second one, from Antwerp to Rotterdam, by Kris Boeckmans (Lotto–Soudal). Boeckmans also won the general classification, as well as the points classification. Rudy Barbier of team Roubaix–Lille Métropole won the young rider classification, and Boeckmans' Lotto–Soudal team won the teams classification.

== Schedule ==
Stage	Date	Course	Distance	Type	Winner	Ref
1	23 May	Rotterdam to Antwerp	195 km (121.2 mi)	Flat stage	Andrea Guardini (ITA)	
2	24 May	Antwerp to Rotterdam	164 km (101.9 mi)	Flat stage	Kris Boeckmans (BEL)	
Total		359 km (223.1 mi)				

== Teams ==
18 teams were selected to take place in the 2015 World Ports Classic. Four of these were UCI WorldTeams, ten were UCI Professional Continental teams, and four were UCI Continental teams.

UCI WorldTeams

- Team Giant–Alpecin
- Lotto–Soudal
- LottoNL–Jumbo
- Astana

UCI Professional Continental teams

- MTN–Qhubeka
- Topsport Vlaanderen–Baloise
- Wanty–Groupe Gobert
- Bora–Argon 18
- Team Europcar
- Team Roompot
- UnitedHealthcare
- Bretagne–Séché Environnement
- Cofidis
- Cult Energy Pro Cycling

Continental teams

- Roubaix–Lille Métropole
- Wallonie-Bruxelles
- Metec–TKH
- Cyclingteam de Rijke

== Stages ==
=== Stage 1 ===
23 May 2015 — Rotterdam to Antwerp, 195 km (121.2 mi)

Stage 1 result

	Rider	Team	Time
1	Andrea Guardini (ITA)	Astana	4h 03' 11"
2	Yauheni Hutarovich (BLR)	Bretagne–Séché Environnement	+ 0"
3	Kris Boeckmans (BEL)	Lotto–Soudal	+ 0"
4	Barry Markus (NED)	LottoNL–Jumbo	+ 0"
5	Dylan Groenewegen (NED)	Team Roompot	+ 0"
6	Rudy Barbier (FRA)	Roubaix–Lille Métropole	+ 0"
7	Edward Theuns (BEL)	Topsport Vlaanderen–Baloise	+ 0"
8	Reinardt Janse van Rensburg (RSA)	MTN–Qhubeka	+ 0"
9	Roy Jans (BEL)	Wanty–Groupe Gobert	+ 0"
10	Sam Bennett (IRL)	Bora–Argon 18	+ 0"

General Classification after Stage 1

	Rider	Team	Time
1	Andrea Guardini (ITA)	Astana	4h 03' 01"
2	Yauheni Hutarovich (BLR)	Bretagne–Séché Environnement	+ 4"
3	Kris Boeckmans (BEL)	Lotto–Soudal	+ 6"
4	Jelle Wallays (BEL)	Topsport Vlaanderen–Baloise	+ 6"
5	Rudy Barbier (FRA)	Roubaix–Lille Métropole	+ 7"
6	Tiesj Benoot (BEL)	Lotto–Soudal	+ 8"
7	Ronan van Zandbeek (NED)	Cyclingteam de Rijke	+ 8"
8	Wesley Kreder (NED)	Team Roompot	+ 9"
9	Barry Markus (NED)	LottoNL–Jumbo	+ 10"
10	Dylan Groenewegen (NED)	Team Roompot	+ 10"

=== Stage 2 ===
24 May 2015 — Antwerp to Rotterdam, 164 km (101.9 mi)

Stage 2 Result

	Rider	Team	Time
1	Kris Boeckmans (BEL)	Lotto–Soudal	3h 29' 54"
2	Danilo Napolitano (ITA)	Wanty–Groupe Gobert	+ 0"
3	Alessandro Bazzana (ITA)	UnitedHealthcare	+ 0"
4	Ramon Sinkeldam (NED)	Team Giant–Alpecin	+ 0"
5	Michael Van Staeyen (BEL)	Cofidis	+ 0"
6	Roy Jans (BEL)	Wanty–Groupe Gobert	+ 0"
7	Edward Theuns (BEL)	Topsport Vlaanderen–Baloise	+ 0"
8	Rudy Barbier (FRA)	Roubaix–Lille Métropole	+ 0"
9	Mike Teunissen (NED)	LottoNL–Jumbo	+ 0"
10	Johim Ariesen (NED)	Metec–TKH	+ 0"

Final General Classification

	Rider	Team	Time
1	Kris Boeckmans (BEL)	Lotto–Soudal	7h 32' 48"
2	Danilo Napolitano (ITA)	Wanty–Groupe Gobert	+ 11"
3	Yauheni Hutarovich (BLR)	Bretagne–Séché Environnement	+ 11"
4	Rudy Barbier (FRA)	Roubaix–Lille Métropole	+ 12"
5	Alessandro Bazzana (ITA)	UnitedHealthcare	+ 13"
6	Tiesj Benoot (BEL)	Lotto–Soudal	+ 15"
7	Edward Theuns (BEL)	Topsport Vlaanderen–Baloise	+ 17"
8	Roy Jans (BEL)	Wanty–Groupe Gobert	+ 17"
9	Michael Van Staeyen (BEL)	Cofidis	+ 17"
10	Johim Ariesen (NED)	Metec–TKH	+ 17"

== Classification leadership table ==
Stage	Winner	General classification	Points classification	Young rider classification	Teams classification
1	Andrea Guardini	Andrea Guardini	Andrea Guardini	Rudy Barbier	Cofidis
2	Kris Boeckmans	Kris Boeckmans	Kris Boeckmans	Rudy Barbier	Lotto–Soudal
Final		Kris Boeckmans	Kris Boeckmans	Rudy Barbier	Lotto–Soudal

== Final standings ==
=== General classification ===
Final general classification
Rank	Rider	Team	Time
1	Kris Boeckmans (BEL)	Lotto–Soudal	7h 32' 48"
2	Danilo Napolitano (ITA)	Wanty–Groupe Gobert	+ 11"
3	Yauheni Hutarovich (BLR)	Bretagne–Séché Environnement	+ 11"
4	Rudy Barbier (FRA)	Roubaix–Lille Métropole	+ 12"
5	Alessandro Bazzana (ITA)	UnitedHealthcare	+ 13"
6	Tiesj Benoot (BEL)	Lotto–Soudal	+ 15"
7	Edward Theuns (BEL)	Topsport Vlaanderen–Baloise	+ 17"
8	Roy Jans (BEL)	Wanty–Groupe Gobert	+ 17"
9	Michael Van Staeyen (BEL)	Cofidis	+ 17"
10	Johim Ariesen (NED)	Metec–TKH	+ 17"

=== Points classification ===
Final points classification
Rank	Rider	Team	Points
1	Kris Boeckmans (BEL)	Lotto–Soudal	48
2	Rudy Barbier (FRA)	Roubaix–Lille Métropole	33
3	Danilo Napolitano (ITA)	Wanty–Groupe Gobert	30
4	Yauheni Hutarovich (BLR)	Bretagne–Séché Environnement	29
5	Edward Theuns (BEL)	Topsport Vlaanderen–Baloise	28
6	Roy Jans (BEL)	Wanty–Groupe Gobert	27
7	Andrea Guardini (ITA)	Astana	26
8	Michael Van Staeyen (BEL)	Cofidis	21
9	Alessandro Bazzana (ITA)	UnitedHealthcare	20
10	Barry Markus (NED)	LottoNL–Jumbo	19

=== Young rider classification ===
Final young rider classification
Rank	Rider	Team	Time
1	Rudy Barbier (FRA)	Roubaix–Lille Métropole	7h 33' 00"
2	Tiesj Benoot (BEL)	Lotto–Soudal	+ 3"
3	Edward Theuns (BEL)	Topsport Vlaanderen–Baloise	+ 5"
4	Roy Jans (BEL)	Wanty–Groupe Gobert	+ 5"
5	Mike Teunissen (NED)	LottoNL–Jumbo	+ 5"
6	Timo Roosen (NED)	LottoNL–Jumbo	+ 5"
7	Sam Bennett (IRL)	Bora–Argon 18	+ 11"
8	Barry Markus (NED)	LottoNL–Jumbo	+ 13"
9	Oliver Naesen (BEL)	Topsport Vlaanderen–Baloise	+ 13"
10	Wesley Kreder (NED)	Team Roompot	+ 14"

=== Teams classification ===
Final teams classification
Rank	Team	Time
1	Lotto–Soudal	22h 39' 15"
2	LottoNL–Jumbo	+ 8"
3	Topsport Vlaanderen–Baloise	+ 18"
4	Team Roompot	+ 26"
5	Metec–TKH	+ 43"
6	Cofidis	+ 59"
7	Wallonie-Bruxelles	+ 1' 16"
8	Wanty–Groupe Gobert	+ 2' 01"
9	MTN–Qhubeka	+ 2' 02"
10	Cyclingteam de Rijke	+ 2' 05"
