= 2015 Vuelta a España, Stage 1 to Stage 11 =

Cycle race

The route of the 2015 Vuelta a España

The 2015 Vuelta a España was a three-week Grand Tour cycling race that took place principally in Spain between 22 August and 13 September 2015; two stages also took place partly or wholly in Andorra. The first ten stages took the race from Spain's southern Mediterranean coast to Castellón de la Plana on the eastern coast.

Stage 1 was a team time trial that took place around the Costa del Sol beach resort of Marbella on 22 August. The day before the stage took place, its route was deemed to be dangerous by the race commissaires; the times did not therefore count for the general classification and several teams rode the stage slowly. The second stage was therefore the first whose times counted; it was the first of nine summit finishes in the Vuelta and was won by Esteban Chaves (Orica–GreenEDGE), who took the leader's red jersey. Stages 3, 4 and 5 were hilly sprint stages, won by Peter Sagan (Tinkoff–Saxo), Alejandro Valverde (Movistar Team) and Caleb Ewan (Orica–GreenEDGE) respectively. Tom Dumoulin (Team Giant–Alpecin) took the red jersey after the fifth stage because of a split in the peloton at the finish line.

The race returned to the mountains on stage 6 with a third-category summit finish. This was again won by Chaves, who therefore regained the race lead. He retained this the following day on the first first-category summit finish of the race. This was won by riders from a breakaway; the significant general classification changes were the several seconds won by Fabio Aru (Astana) and the time lost by Chris Froome (Team Sky), the winner of the 2015 Tour de France. Another hilly stage followed: this was won by Jasper Stuyven (Trek Factory Racing) from a sprint, despite breaking his scaphoid earlier in the stage. Several other riders crashed during the stage, including Sagan, who was hit by a race motorbike. The ninth stage was the first before the Vuelta's first rest day and was another first-category summit finish. It was won by Dumoulin just ahead of Froome; Dumoulin took back the red jersey.

After a transfer to Andorra and the rest day, the riders took on a very difficult stage at the beginning of the second week. This involved six categorised climbs in just 138 kilometres (86 mi) of racing, with very little flat road between them. The stage was won by Mikel Landa (Astana), with his teammate Fabio Aru moving into the race lead and Rodríguez moving into second, with Dumoulin third. Chris Froome (Team Sky), who had crashed at the very beginning of the stage and ridden the rest of it with a broken foot, withdrew from the race the following morning.

== Classification standings ==
Legend
Red jersey	Denotes the leader of the general classification	Green jersey	Denotes the leader of the points classification
Blue polka dot jersey	Denotes the leader of the mountains classification	White jersey	Denotes the leader of the combination rider classification

== Stage 1 ==
22 August 2015 — Puerto Banús to Marbella, 7.4 km (5 mi) (TTT)

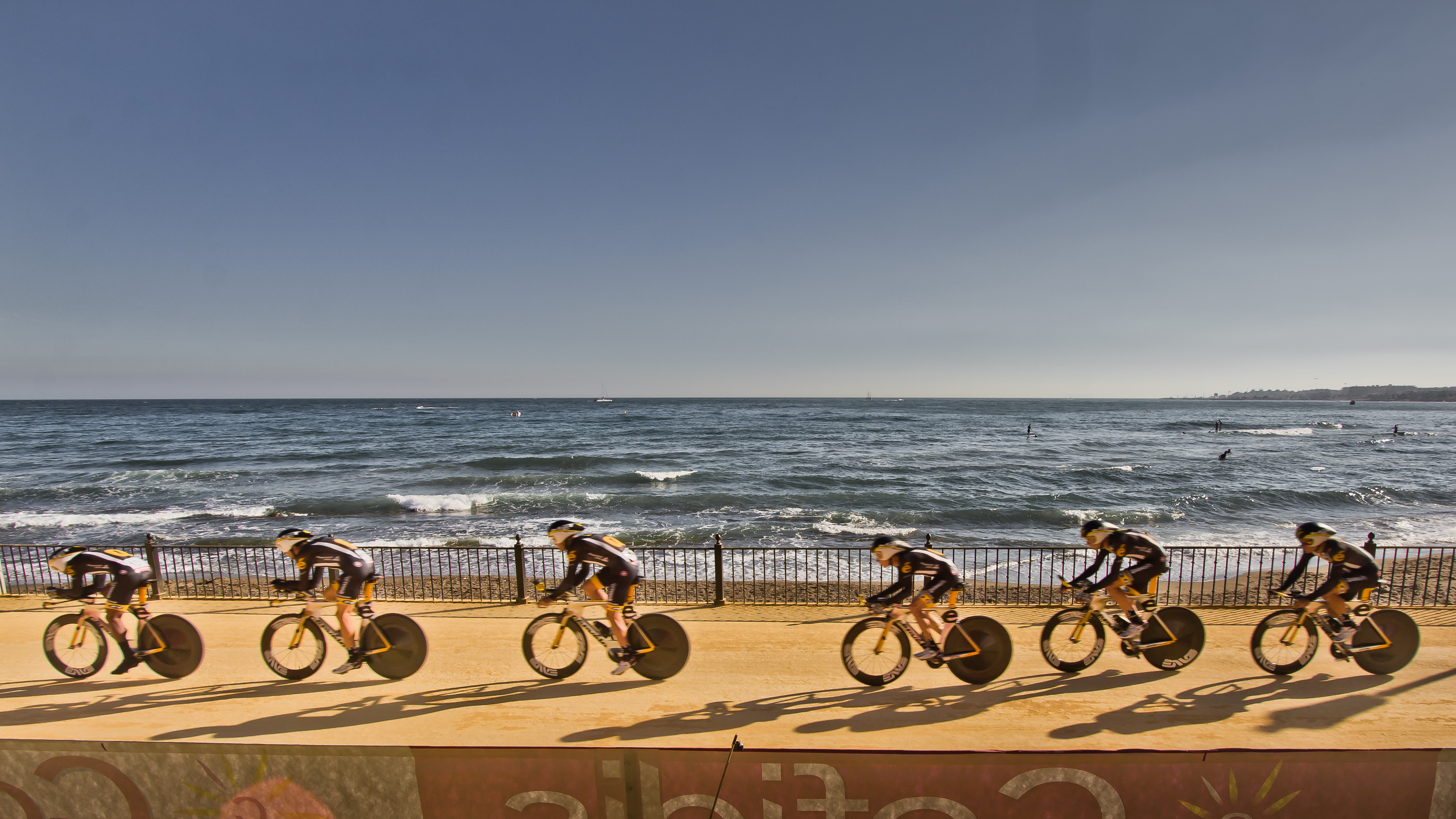
The MTN–Qhubeka team, who were first to start the stage, riding across one of the controversial sandy sections

The first stage was a flat, 7.4-kilometre (4.6 mi) team time trial along the sea front from Puerto Banús to Marbella. It was scheduled to take place in the evening, with the first team starting at 18:40 and the last team expected to finish at 20:33. Two days before the stage, several riders arrived at the course and raised concerns about safety. Their concerns included the seven changes in road surface, ramps, a section on a rubber mat on the beach and a raised bridge section. Following a meeting between the race organisers, the Union Cycliste Internationale (UCI) and the riders' union, it was decided to use the original route but to neutralise the stage for the general classification. The teams would, however, race for stage victory and the times would count for the team classification.

The first team to set a time was MTN–Qhubeka, who set a time of 8' 40". This was soon beaten by the next team to start, LottoNL–Jumbo, who went 22" quicker. Their lead lasted until the eleventh team to start, Orica–GreenEDGE, beat them by 7" to move into the lead. Trek Factory Racing put in a strong ride but were 11" behind Orica–GreenEDGE. Tinkoff–Saxo then moved into the lead by less than a second. BMC Racing Team then beat this time – again by less than a second. The remaining teams – including Team Sky, Astana, Movistar Team and Team Katusha – rode carefully and did not attempt to win the stage, as it had no effect on the general classification. BMC therefore won the stage by a narrow margin ahead of Tinkoff–Saxo; this was their second team time trial success in successive Grand Tours after a similarly narrow victory over Sky in the Tour de France.

Peter Velits was the first BMC rider to cross the finish line and was therefore awarded the red jersey as the leader of the race, although all the 198 riders were on the same time. He attributed the team's victory to the tactic of sacrificing several riders who rode very hard at the beginning of the stage, while the remaining riders held on to set the time. Velits had previous success in the Vuelta: he finished on the podium of the 2010 edition. Vincenzo Nibali (Astana) explained after the stage that his team had not attempted to win the stage because it was "quite dangerous" and there were "a lot of vibrations from the different surfaces", with additional difficulty coming from the time trial bikes.

Result of stage 1
Rank	Team	Time
1	BMC Racing Team	8' 10"
2	Tinkoff–Saxo	+ 1"
3	Orica–GreenEDGE	+ 1"
4	LottoNL–Jumbo	+ 8"
5	Etixx–Quick-Step	+ 10"
6	Trek Factory Racing	+ 12"
7	Caja Rural–Seguros RGA	+ 18"
8	Lotto–Soudal	+ 18"
9	Movistar Team	+ 24"
10	Cofidis	+ 27"
Source: ProCyclingStats

== Stage 2 ==
23 August 2015 — Alhaurín de la Torre to Caminito del Rey, 158.7 km (98.6 mi)

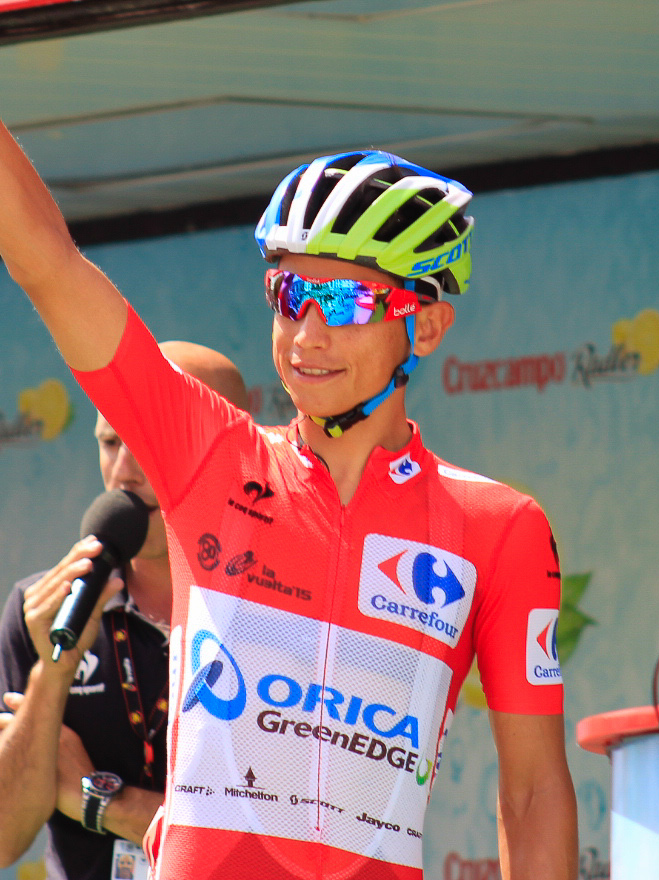
Esteban Chaves (Orica–GreenEDGE), wearing the red jersey of the leader of the general classification

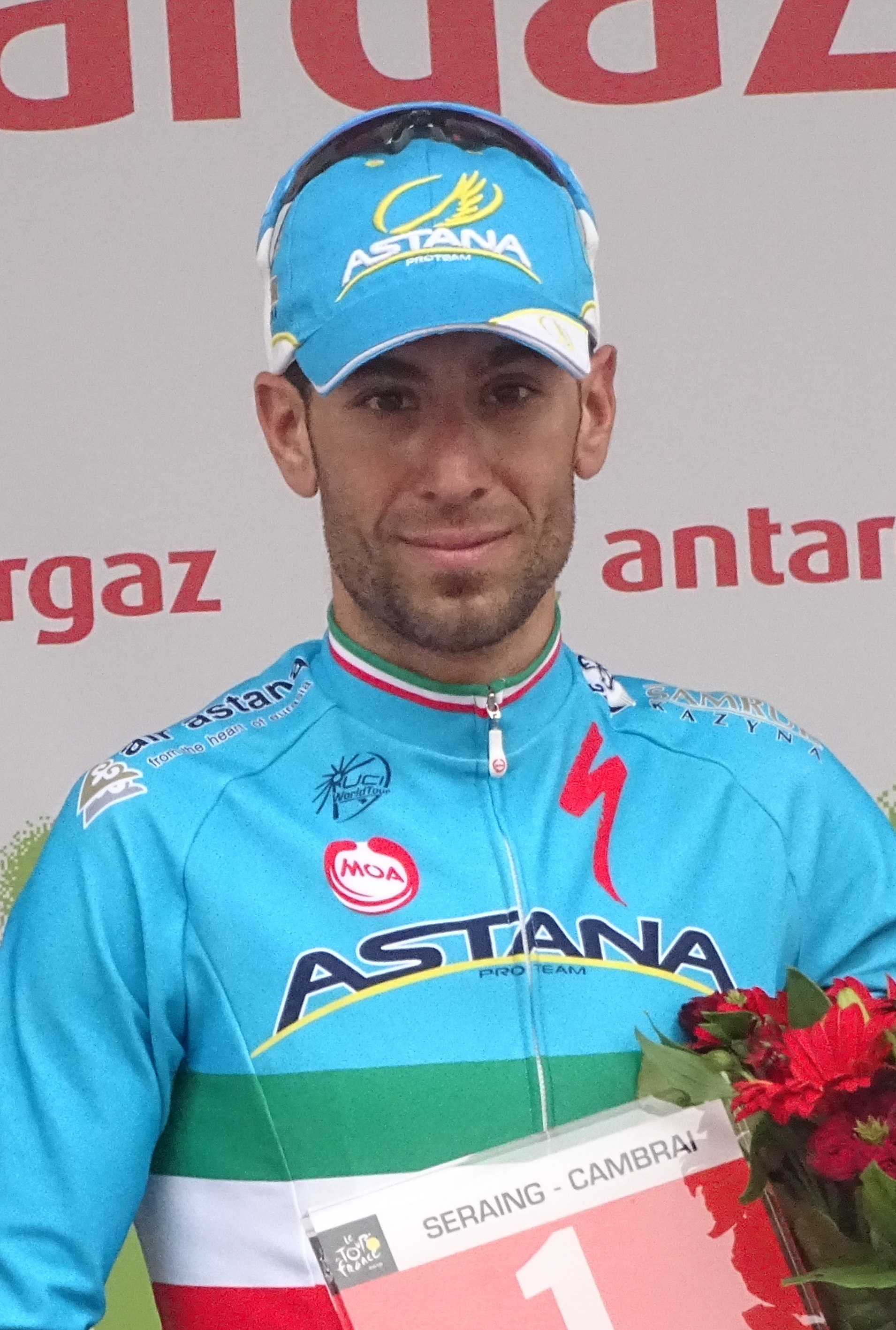
Vincenzo Nibali (Astana) was disqualified from the race after holding onto a team car (photographed during the 2015 Tour de France).

The second stage was a 158.7-kilometre (98.6 mi) route that included the first summit finish of the race. Most of the stage was fairly flat, with only the third-category Alto de Ardales after 113 kilometres (70 mi) providing any significant difficulty (5 kilometres (3.1 mi) at 4.4%). The finish of the stage, however, was on the third-category Alto de la Mesa. This was 4.7 kilometres (2.9 mi) at an average of 6.5%, including a section of 2.5 kilometres (1.6 mi) at almost 9% and shorter sections of 15%. The stage finished near the Caminito del Rey, one of the most famous sights in Málaga.

The first crash of the Vuelta came after just 2 kilometres (1.2 mi) of racing: Matteo Pelucchi (IAM Cycling) was riding at the back of the peloton and crashed on a corner as Movistar rode hard at the front. He suffered abrasions and road rash and was forced to abandon the race. A breakaway escaped approximately 18 kilometres (11 mi) later. It was formed of Nelson Oliveira (Lampre–Merida), Davide Villella (Cannondale–Garmin), Walter Pedraza (Colombia), Bert-Jan Lindeman (LottoNL–Jumbo), José Gonçalves (Caja Rural–Seguros RGA) and Matteo Montaguti (AG2R La Mondiale). Although the six riders were unable to build a significant lead, they did lead over the first climb of the day; Pedraza won the mountain points at the top of the Vuelta's first climb. At this point, the break's lead was about one minute.

With 30 kilometres (19 mi) remaining, however, there was a large crash in the peloton, delaying a large number of riders. Vincenzo Nibali and Fabio Aru (both Astana) were among the riders caught up in the crash. Aru was quickly given a bike and was soon with the main peloton, but Nibali waited a long time before Giuseppe Martinelli provided him with a new bike. Nibali was then forced to make a long chase to return to the peloton. Another Astana rider, Paolo Tiralongo also crashed and was seen after the incident bleeding from his head. After the team lost Pelucchi early in the day, IAM Cycling's David Tanner was also caught in the crash and suffered a broken pelvis.

On the climb to the finish, Cyril Gautier (Team Europcar) was the first to attack, but was soon caught by Nairo Quintana (Movistar), who was in a group with Nicolas Roche (Sky) and Tom Dumoulin (Team Giant–Alpecin). After work from his team, Esteban Chaves (Orica–GreenEDGE) attacked and bridged across to the leading three riders. Chaves soon dropped Quintana from the group and, despite an attack from Roche in the final 1 kilometre (0.6 mi), took the stage victory. This was his first ever Grand Tour stage victory and gave him the leader's jersey. Dumoulin was second on the stage with Roche third. Dan Martin (Cannondale–Garmin) was fourth, 14" back, with Joaquim Rodríguez (Team Katusha) and Quintana a further 12" behind. Chris Froome (Sky) and Alejandro Valverde (Movistar) came in together 30" behind Chaves, with Aru and all the other contenders further behind. As well as taking the overall lead of the race, Chaves also took the lead in the other three classifications (the points classification, the mountains classification and the combination classification).

After the stage, a video emerged of Nibali holding onto his team car as it accelerated away from a group of riders that had been caught up in the crash. The acceleration helped Nibali to rejoin the peloton ahead of the final climb. As a result of the incident, the race jury disqualified Nibali from the race, describing the situation as "really clear". One of the team's directeurs sportifs, Alexander Shefer, was also excluded from taking further part in the race. Nibali apologised for the incident after the race, but also expressed his frustration at having been abandoned by his team.

Result of stage 2
Rank	Rider	Team	Time
1	Esteban Chaves (COL)	Orica–GreenEDGE	3h 57' 25"
2	Tom Dumoulin (NED)	Team Giant–Alpecin	+ 1"
3	Nicolas Roche (IRL)	Team Sky	+ 9"
4	Dan Martin (IRL)	Cannondale–Garmin	+ 14"
5	Joaquim Rodríguez (ESP)	Team Katusha	+ 26"
6	Nairo Quintana (COL)	Movistar Team	+ 26"
7	Chris Froome (GBR)	Team Sky	+ 30"
8	Alejandro Valverde (ESP)	Movistar Team	+ 30"
9	Daniel Moreno (ESP)	Team Katusha	+ 30"
10	Fabio Aru (ITA)	Astana	+ 37"
Source: ProCyclingStats

General classification after stage 2
Rank	Rider	Team	Time
1	Esteban Chaves (COL)	Orica–GreenEDGE	3h 57' 15"
2	Tom Dumoulin (NED)	Team Giant–Alpecin	+ 5"
3	Nicolas Roche (IRL)	Team Sky	+ 15"
4	Dan Martin (IRL)	Cannondale–Garmin	+ 24"
5	Joaquim Rodríguez (ESP)	Team Katusha	+ 35"
6	Nairo Quintana (COL)	Movistar Team	+ 36"
7	Alejandro Valverde (ESP)	Movistar Team	+ 38"
8	Chris Froome (GBR)	Team Sky	+ 40"
9	Daniel Moreno (ESP)	Team Katusha	+ 40"
10	Fabio Aru (ITA)	Astana	+ 47"
Source: ProCyclingStats

== Stage 3 ==
24 August 2015 — Mijas to Málaga, 158.4 km (98 mi)

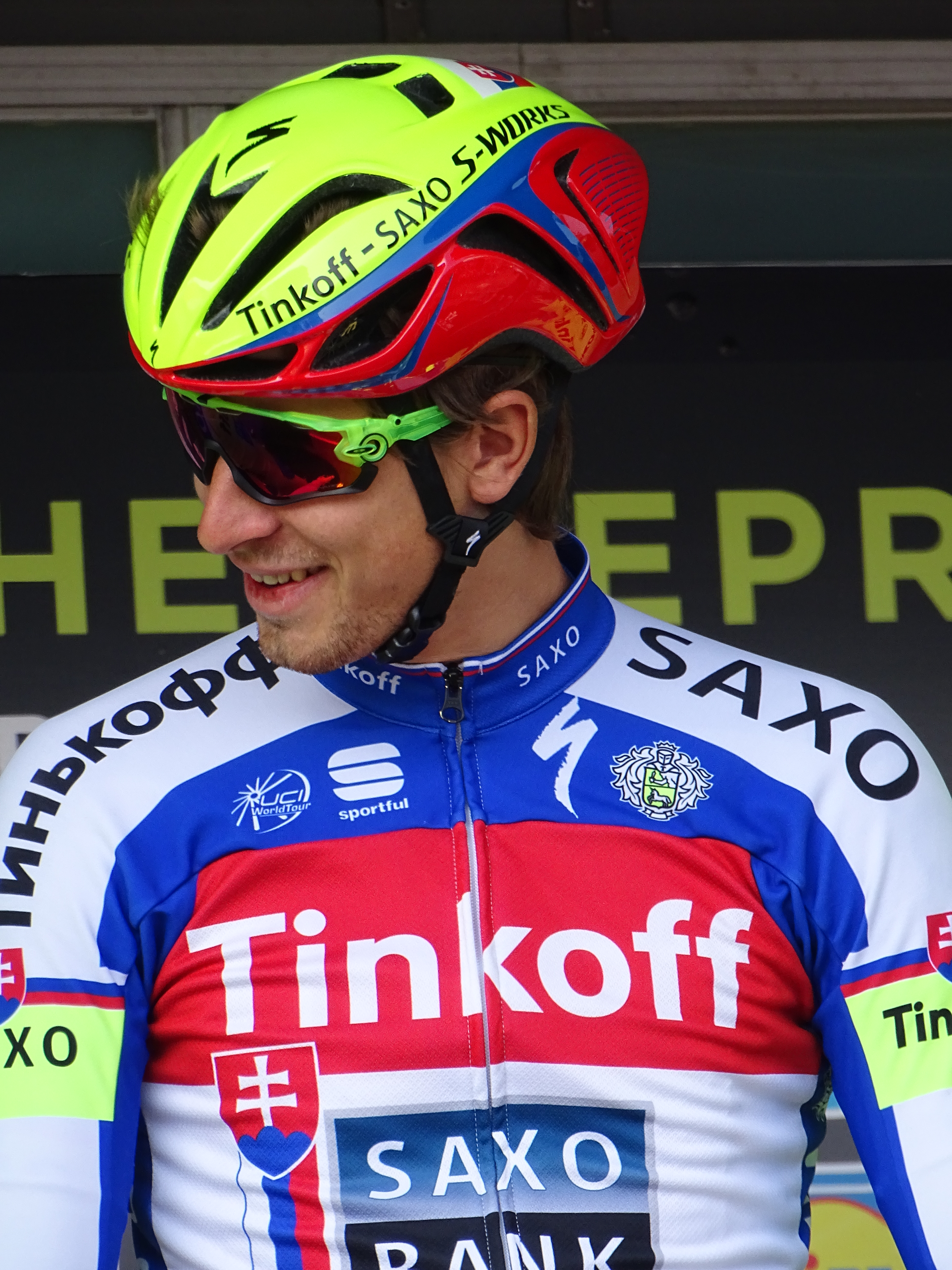
Peter Sagan (Tinkoff–Saxo) won his first Grand Tour victory in over two years (photograph from the 2015 Scheldeprijs).

The third stage of the race was a mixed, 158.4-kilometre (98.4 mi) route from Mijas to Málaga. After 10 kilometres (6.2 mi) of flat roads at the start, there was the third-category Alto de Mijas (6 kilometres (3.7 mi) at 7%). Following a long descent, there were 30 kilometres (19 mi) more flat roads, before the first-category Puerto del León (16 kilometres (9.9 mi) at 5.2%). More flat roads followed as the riders approached Málaga along the coast, though there were more small hills in the final 15 kilometres (9.3 mi). The final kilometres were flat, though there was a tight turn with just over 1 kilometre (0.6 mi) to the finish line.

A breakaway was formed early into the day, without significant chasing. It included eight riders: Natnael Berhane (MTN-Qhubeka), Sylvain Chavanel (IAM), Omar Fraile (Caja Rural), Walter Pedraza (Colombia), Martin Velits (Etixx-Quick Step), Alexis Gougeard (AG2R La Mondiale), Ilia Koshevoy (Lampre-Mérida) and Maarten Tjallingii (LottoNL-Jumbo). They had a three-minute lead over the peloton as they crossed the Alto de Mijas, with Fraile taking the mountains points. The first significant incident of the day was Paolo Tiralongo's abandoning the race; he had failed to recover from the crash on stage 2. Fraile also won the second mountain sprint of the day on the Puerto del León to take the lead of the mountains classification.

Despite the exposed course of the race, there were no significant winds and the most notable incident was the crash of Nacer Bouhanni (Cofidis) in the main peloton. Bouhanni clashed wheels with Daniele Bennati (Tinkoff-Saxo) with 44 kilometres (27 mi) to the end of the stage; both returned to the main peloton. Bouhanni was assisted in getting back to the peloton by a "sticky bottle", where his directeur sportif handed him a bottle of water; handing the bottle over took twelve seconds, during which time the team car accelerated, helping Bouhanni in his chase. The incident drew comparisons with the one that had led to Nibali's disqualification the previous day; Bouhanni, however, was fined CHF 100.

After the intermediate sprint – won by Chavanel – the breakaway broke up, with Tjallingii and Gougeard continuing in the lead; at one point they were 1' 40" ahead of the chasing peloton. The peloton was controlled by Tinkoff-Saxo (riding for Peter Sagan) and Giant-Alpecin (riding for John Degenkolb). The combined pressure of these teams caused Caleb Ewan (Orica–GreenEDGE) to be dropped and the breakaway was caught soon afterwards. Giant-Alpecin led out the sprint, but Sagan and Bouhanni were able to come around Degenkolb and Sagan took the stage victory. The victory was Sagan's first in a Grand Tour in over two years, since stage 7 of the 2013 Tour de France.

Result of stage 3
Rank	Rider	Team	Time
1	Peter Sagan (SVK)	Tinkoff–Saxo	4h 06' 46"
2	Nacer Bouhanni (FRA)	Cofidis	+ 0"
3	John Degenkolb (GER)	Team Giant–Alpecin	+ 0"
4	Jempy Drucker (LUX)	BMC Racing Team	+ 0"
5	Maximiliano Richeze (ARG)	Lampre–Merida	+ 0"
6	Kristian Sbaragli (ITA)	MTN–Qhubeka	+ 0"
7	Mitchell Docker (AUS)	Orica–GreenEDGE	+ 0"
8	Jasper Stuyven (BEL)	Trek Factory Racing	+ 0"
9	Vicente Reynès (ESP)	IAM Cycling	+ 0"
10	Tom Van Asbroeck (BEL)	LottoNL–Jumbo	+ 0"
Source: ProCyclingStats

General classification after stage 3
Rank	Rider	Team	Time
1	Esteban Chaves (COL)	Orica–GreenEDGE	8h 04' 01"
2	Tom Dumoulin (NED)	Team Giant–Alpecin	+ 5"
3	Nicolas Roche (IRL)	Team Sky	+ 15"
4	Dan Martin (IRL)	Cannondale–Garmin	+ 24"
5	Joaquim Rodríguez (ESP)	Team Katusha	+ 35"
6	Nairo Quintana (COL)	Movistar Team	+ 36"
7	Alejandro Valverde (ESP)	Movistar Team	+ 38"
8	Chris Froome (GBR)	Team Sky	+ 40"
9	Daniel Moreno (ESP)	Team Katusha	+ 40"
10	Fabio Aru (ITA)	Astana	+ 47"
Source: ProCyclingStats

== Stage 4 ==
25 August 2015 — Estepona to Vejer de la Frontera, 209.6 km (130.2 mi)

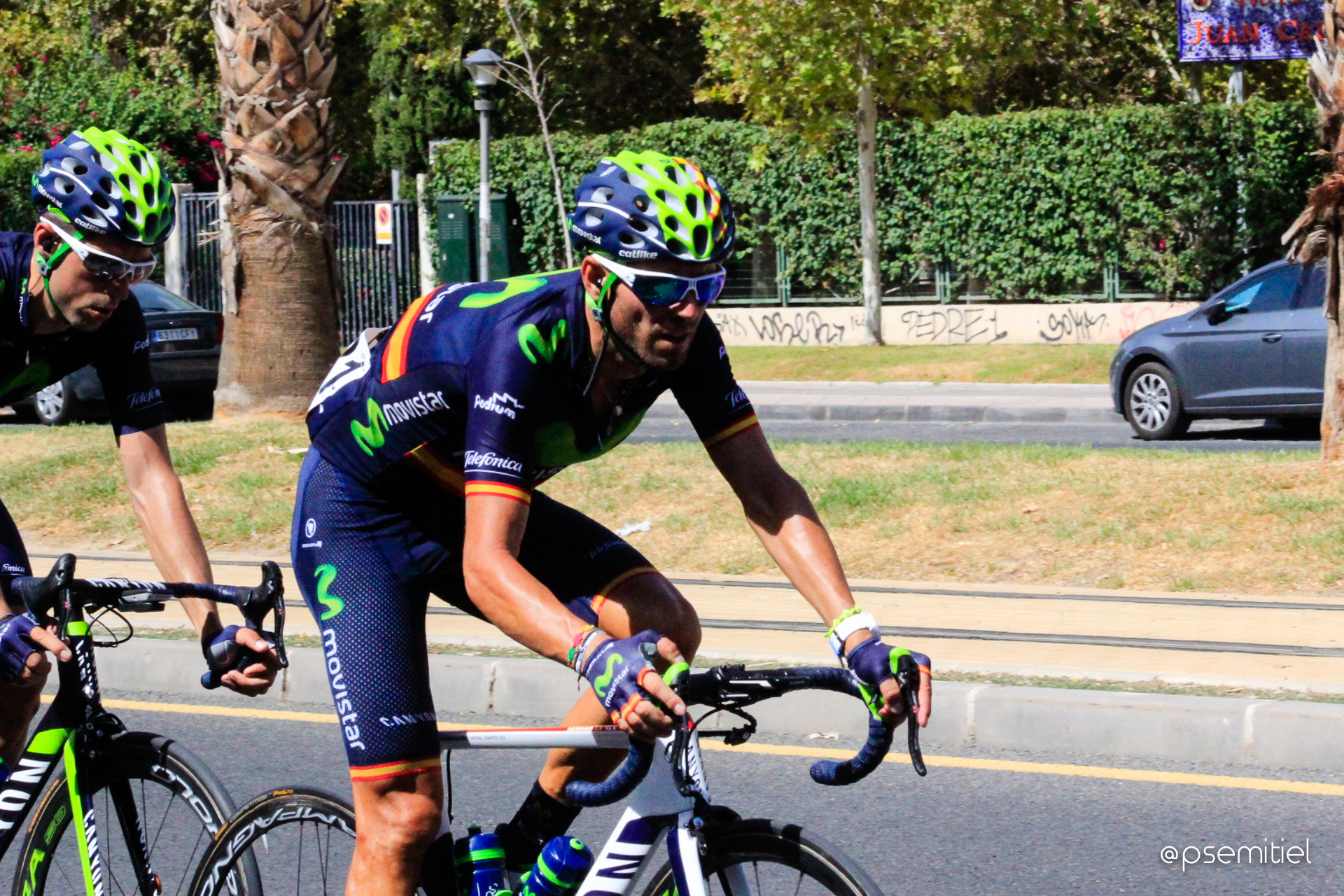
Alejandro Valverde (Movistar Team) won his ninth Vuelta stage on stage 4.

The fourth stage was a 209.6-kilometre (130.2 mi) route from Estepona to Vejer de la Frontera. The route did not include any categorised climbs. However, it was not expected to suit the sprinters, because there was a sharp incline in the closing part of the stage. With 4 kilometres (2.5 mi) remaining, there was a 1-kilometre (0.6 mi) section at approximately 13%, followed by a flatter section, a short descent and then another incline to the line. The roads used were narrow and twisting; the finale was expected to suit the puncheurs.

The breakaway was again swift to form in the early part of the stage. It included six riders: Mickaël Delage (FDJ), Bert-Jan Lindeman (LottoNL-Jumbo), Nikolas Maes (Etixx-Quick Step), Jimmy Engoulvent (Europcar), Kristijan Đurasek (Lampre-Mérida) and Markel Irizar (Trek Factory Racing). Their lead extended to thirteen minutes early in the stage, but it was quickly cut down by Orica–GreenEDGE along with Movistar and Katusha, to around seven minutes at the halfway point of the stage. Tinkoff–Saxo joined the chase in the second half of the stage and the lead was gradually reduced.

The most significant moment during the chase came 33 kilometres (21 mi) from the finish, when several riders fell on a tight corner. These included Tejay van Garderen (BMC), who was helped to return to the peloton by his teammates. Another rider caught up in the incident was Ben King (Cannondale–Garmin), who stood by the side of the road waiting for his team to bring him a new bike. While he was waiting, one spectator stole his bicycle computer and another attempted to ride off on his bike, although a mechanical problem stopped him.

Engoulvent and Irizar attacked from the breakaway and gained a 30-second lead, but they were caught by the peloton before the ascent in the final kilometres. Tosh Van der Sande (Lotto–Soudal) was the first rider to attack; after he fell back, Pello Bilbao (Caja Rural) attacked with 4 kilometres (2.5 mi) to the finish. He was caught 2 kilometres (1.2 mi) later, at which point Samuel Sánchez (BMC) and Nicolas Roche attacked. They initially had a significant lead, but the incline in the final part of the stage allowed the peloton to come back to them. Sánchez was caught first, with Roche caught in the final 200 metres (660 ft). Alejandro Valverde won the stage, with Sagan second and Daniel Moreno (Team Katusha) third. Roche held on for fourth place on the stage. The stage was the ninth Vuelta stage victory of Valverde's career.

Chaves retained his red jersey and the white jersey of the combination classification, but Sagan took over the lead of the points classification.

Result of stage 4
Rank	Rider	Team	Time
1	Alejandro Valverde (ESP)	Movistar Team	5h 07' 30"
2	Peter Sagan (SVK)	Tinkoff–Saxo	+ 0"
3	Daniel Moreno (ESP)	Team Katusha	+ 0"
4	Nicolas Roche (IRL)	Team Sky	+ 0"
5	José Gonçalves (POR)	Caja Rural–Seguros RGA	+ 0"
6	Joaquim Rodríguez (ESP)	Team Katusha	+ 0"
7	Julien Simon (FRA)	Cofidis	+ 0"
8	Rafał Majka (POL)	Tinkoff–Saxo	+ 0"
9	Nairo Quintana (COL)	Movistar Team	+ 0"
10	Esteban Chaves (COL)	Orica–GreenEDGE	+ 0"
Source: ProCyclingStats

General classification after stage 4
Rank	Rider	Team	Time
1	Esteban Chaves (COL)	Orica–GreenEDGE	13h 11' 31"
2	Tom Dumoulin (NED)	Team Giant–Alpecin	+ 5"
3	Nicolas Roche (IRL)	Team Sky	+ 15"
4	Dan Martin (IRL)	Cannondale–Garmin	+ 24"
5	Alejandro Valverde (ESP)	Movistar Team	+ 28"
6	Joaquim Rodríguez (ESP)	Team Katusha	+ 35"
7	Daniel Moreno (ESP)	Team Katusha	+ 36"
8	Nairo Quintana (COL)	Movistar Team	+ 36"
9	Chris Froome (GBR)	Team Sky	+ 40"
10	Fabio Aru (ITA)	Astana	+ 47"
Source: ProCyclingStats

== Stage 5 ==
26 August 2015 — Rota to Alcalá de Guadaíra, 167.3 km (104.0 mi)

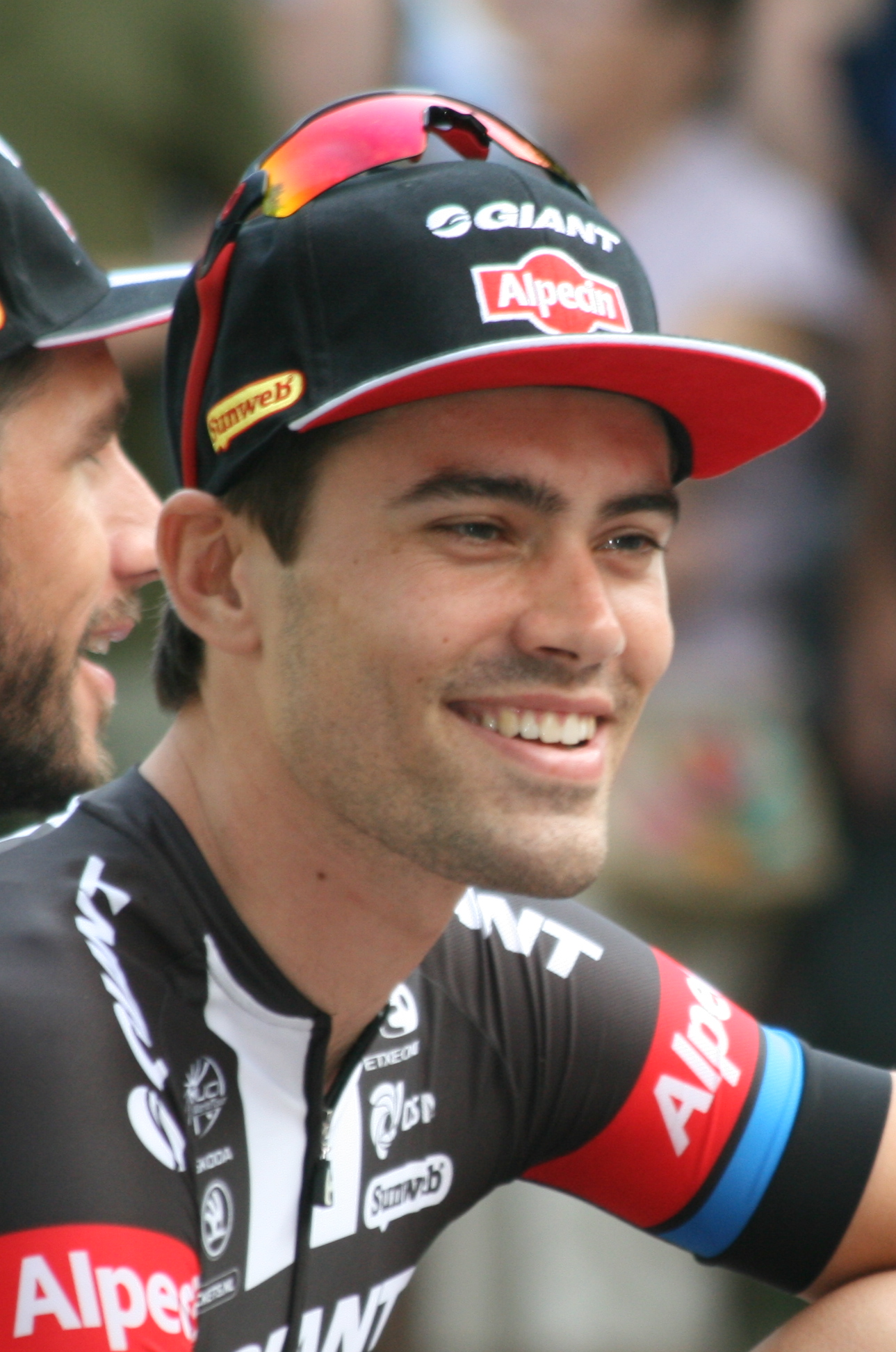
Tom Dumoulin (Team Giant–Alpecin) took over the lead of the Vuelta following a split at the finish line (photograph from the 2015 Tour de France).

The fifth stage was another fairly flat stage: a 167.3-kilometre (104.0 mi) route from Rota to Alcalá de Guadaíra. Cyclingnews.com described it as "on paper, ... the most straightforward stage of the race". The first part of the course was along the coast, before turning inland towards Jerez de la Frontera then north towards the finish. There was a slight gradient in the final 750 metres (2,500 ft). The principal difficulty in the stage was expected to be the heat, with crosswinds also a possibility.

The stage started with a solo attack from Tsgabu Grmay (Lampre–Merida). After 19 kilometres (12 mi) of racing, Iljo Keisse (Etixx–Quick-Step) and Antoine Duchesne (Team Europcar) joined him to form a three-man breakaway. The three riders gained a lead of over seven minutes; Giant-Alpecin and Tinkoff-Saxo then began to control the front of the peloton and reduce the breakaway's advantage; with 70 kilometres (43 mi) remaining, Grmay, Keisse and Duchesne had a lead of about five minutes. This was reduced further when Cofidis began to assist in the chase in support of Bouhanni. The breakaway broke up after Grmay stopped contributing to the group's effort: Keisse was visibly annoyed at him, then attacked and went off in a solo move. Grmay and Duchesne were first to be caught; Keisse was then brought back by the peloton inside the final 10 kilometres (6.2 mi).

The peloton rode hard on the flat roads approaching the incline at the finish. Astana, Tinkoff-Saxo, Sky and Katusha all contributed at the front of the group before the sprinters' teams took over. MTN-Qhubeka was the first of these, while Cofidis were unable to position Bouhanni correctly. Orica–GreenEDGE, who had not been involved in the chase for most of the stage, came to the front for the final section, with its several tight corners. Degenkolb was the first to open the sprint with Sagan on his wheel, but Orica–GreenEDGE's Caleb Ewan was able to come past both of them to take the stage victory. Degenkolb was second and Sagan third. The stage was Ewan's first Grand Tour stage victory: the Vuelta was his first Grand Tour and came in the first year of his professional career.

There were several splits in the peloton at the finish. Fourteen riders – including Chris Froome, Tom Dumoulin, Samuel Sánchez and Rafał Majka – finished two seconds behind Ewan, with most of the other general classification riders – including Chaves, Valverde, Rodríguez and Aru – a further six seconds back. Dumoulin therefore took over the race lead from Chaves by one second; Chaves retained his lead of the combination classification.

Result of stage 5
Rank	Rider	Team	Time
1	Caleb Ewan (AUS)	Orica–GreenEDGE	3h 57' 28"
2	John Degenkolb (GER)	Team Giant–Alpecin	+ 0"
3	Peter Sagan (SVK)	Tinkoff–Saxo	+ 0"
4	Jempy Drucker (LUX)	BMC Racing Team	+ 0"
5	José Joaquín Rojas (ESP)	Movistar Team	+ 2"
6	Kristian Sbaragli (ITA)	MTN–Qhubeka	+ 2"
7	Domenico Pozzovivo (ITA)	AG2R La Mondiale	+ 2"
8	Daniel Moreno (ESP)	Team Katusha	+ 2"
9	Tosh Van der Sande (BEL)	Lotto–Soudal	+ 2"
10	Nikolas Maes (BEL)	Etixx–Quick-Step	+ 2"
Source: ProCyclingStats

General classification after stage 5
Rank	Rider	Team	Time
1	Tom Dumoulin (NED)	Team Giant–Alpecin	17h 09' 06"
2	Esteban Chaves (COL)	Orica–GreenEDGE	+ 1"
3	Nicolas Roche (IRL)	Team Sky	+ 16"
4	Dan Martin (IRL)	Cannondale–Garmin	+ 25"
5	Alejandro Valverde (ESP)	Movistar Team	+ 29"
6	Daniel Moreno (ESP)	Team Katusha	+ 31"
7	Chris Froome (GBR)	Team Sky	+ 35"
8	Joaquim Rodríguez (ESP)	Team Katusha	+ 36"
9	Nairo Quintana (COL)	Movistar Team	+ 37"
10	Fabio Aru (ITA)	Astana	+ 48"
Source: ProCyclingStats

== Stage 6 ==
27 August 2015 — Córdoba to Sierra de Cazorla, 200.3 km (124.5 mi)

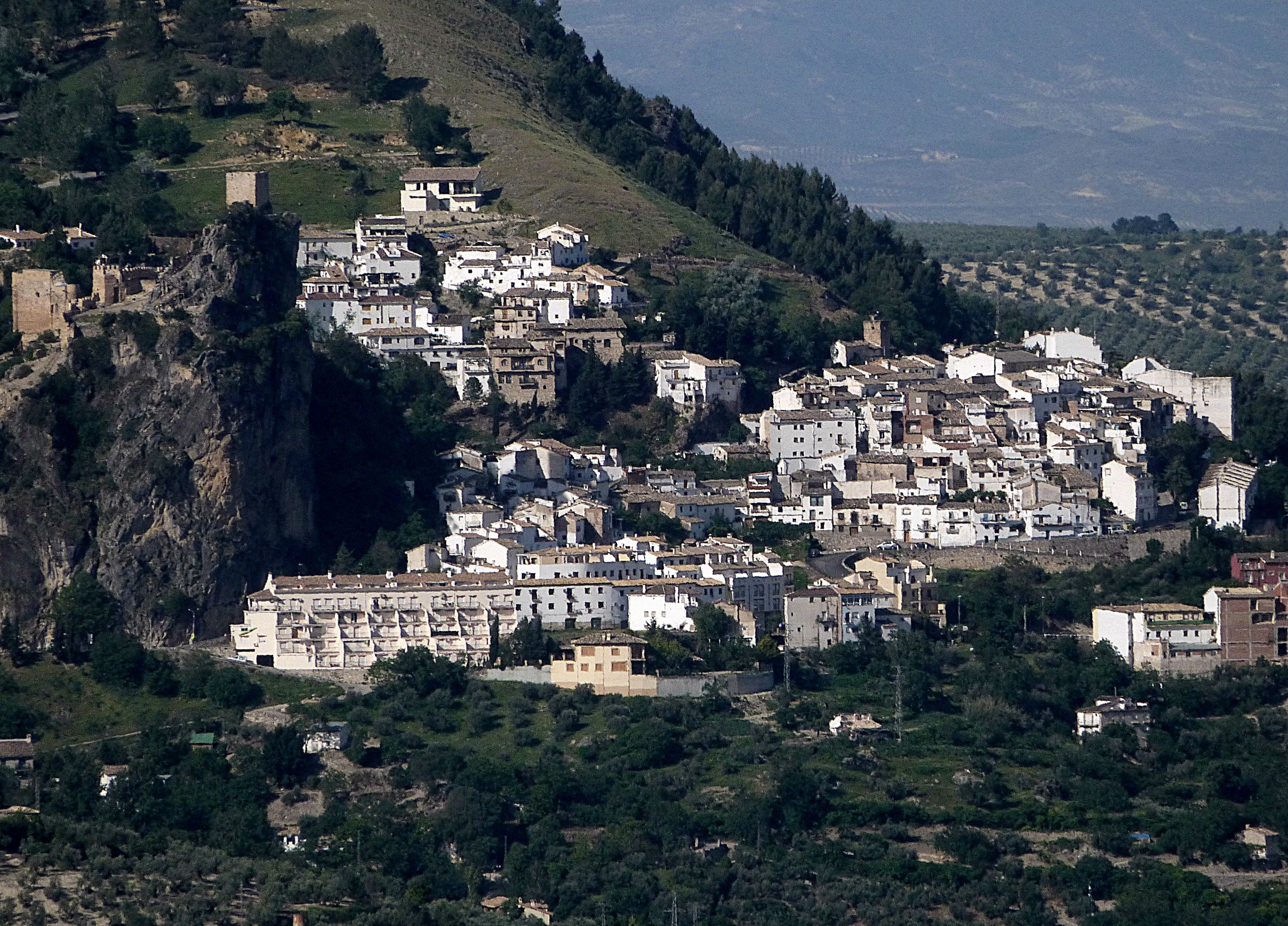
Stage 6 finished above the town of Cazorla in the Sierra de Cazorla.

The sixth stage was a 200.3-kilometre (124.5 mi) route from Córdoba to Sierra de Cazorla. The route was consistently undulating, with small hills throughout the first two-thirds. The final third was the most difficult and included two third-category climbs. The first of these was the Alto de Baeza (11.8 kilometres (7.3 mi) at 3.9%), the summit of which came with 55.8 kilometres (34.7 mi) to the end of the stage. Another undulating section was followed by a descent and then a long climb to the finish. The road climbed consistently for around 20 kilometres (12 mi) before a short descent and then the climb to the summit finish, the Alto de Cazorla. This final climb was 3.3 kilometres (2.1 mi) at 6.3% and was expected to produce some of the biggest gaps of the Vuelta so far.

The day's breakaway took a long time to form. Various riders attacked, but the peloton brought back all the moves for the first 60 kilometres (37 mi) of racing. Eventually a five-rider breakaway was allowed to form, composed of Steve Cummings (MTN-Qhubeka), Peter Velits (BMC), Kristijan Đurasek (Lampre-Mérida), Niki Terpstra (Etixx-Quick Step), and Cyril Gautier (Europcar), and they were soon joined by Miguel Ángel Rubiano (Colombia). The six riders gained a lead of over four minutes, but it was already being brought back by the peloton by the time they reached the Alto de Baeza, where Gautier was the first rider to the summit. Giant-Alpecin (on behalf of Dumoulin) and Movistar controlled the pace at the front of the peloton. With 19 kilometres (12 mi) remaining, as the roads began to go uphill, the lead was under a minute. Cummings attacked with 11.5 kilometres (7.1 mi) to the end of the stage and built a lead: with 5 kilometres (3.1 mi) to the finish line his lead was 48 seconds. Terpstra was the only rider from the breakaway to chase him; the other riders sat up and were caught by the peloton.

Cummings's lead was slowly reduced by the peloton; he only had a small lead when the categorised portion of the climb started in the final 3.3 kilometres (2.1 mi). Esteban Chaves, who was one second behind Dumoulin going into the stage, attacked the peloton with 2.4 kilometres (1.5 mi) remaining as the roads reached a gradient of 15%. Chaves said after the stage that he was worried that he had attacked too soon and would not be able to keep a lead to the top of the climb. He quickly caught and passed Cummings. When the gradient eased with 2 kilometres (1.2 mi) remaining, Dumoulin counter-attacked to try to defend his red jersey. Other attacks came from Dan Martin and from Nicolas Roche, but they were unable to catch Chaves, who held on to take the stage victory. Martin finished second, five seconds behind Chaves, with Dumoulin on the same time. A large group, including all the general classification favourites, finished six seconds further back.

Chaves's win was his second of the race and the third for Orica–GreenEDGE. With the aid of the time bonuses, he moved into a ten-second lead ahead of Dumoulin and took back the red jersey. He also retained the white jersey of the combination classification. Martin moved into third place overall, 33 seconds behind Chaves. Alejandro Valverde said after the stage that he now considered Chaves a "big rival" for the overall victory.

Result of stage 6
Rank	Rider	Team	Time
1	Esteban Chaves (COL)	Orica–GreenEDGE	4h 46' 16"
2	Dan Martin (IRL)	Cannondale–Garmin	+ 5"
3	Tom Dumoulin (NED)	Team Giant–Alpecin	+ 5"
4	Rubén Plaza (ESP)	Lampre–Merida	+ 11"
5	Alejandro Valverde (ESP)	Movistar Team	+ 11"
6	Joaquim Rodríguez (ESP)	Team Katusha	+ 11"
7	Chris Froome (GBR)	Team Sky	+ 11"
8	Rafał Majka (POL)	Tinkoff–Saxo	+ 11"
9	Nairo Quintana (COL)	Movistar Team	+ 11"
10	Nicolas Roche (IRL)	Team Sky	+ 11"
Source: ProCyclingStats

General classification after stage 6
Rank	Rider	Team	Time
1	Esteban Chaves (COL)	Orica–GreenEDGE	21h 55' 13"
2	Tom Dumoulin (NED)	Team Giant–Alpecin	+ 10"
3	Dan Martin (IRL)	Cannondale–Garmin	+ 33"
4	Nicolas Roche (IRL)	Team Sky	+ 36"
5	Alejandro Valverde (ESP)	Movistar Team	+ 49"
6	Chris Froome (GBR)	Team Sky	+ 55"
7	Daniel Moreno (ESP)	Team Katusha	+ 55"
8	Joaquim Rodríguez (ESP)	Team Katusha	+ 56"
9	Nairo Quintana (COL)	Movistar Team	+ 57"
10	Fabio Aru (ITA)	Astana	+ 1' 12"
Source: ProCyclingStats

== Stage 7 ==
28 August 2015 — Jódar to La Alpujarra, 191.1 km (118.7 mi)

Profile of the final climb of the Alto de Capileira

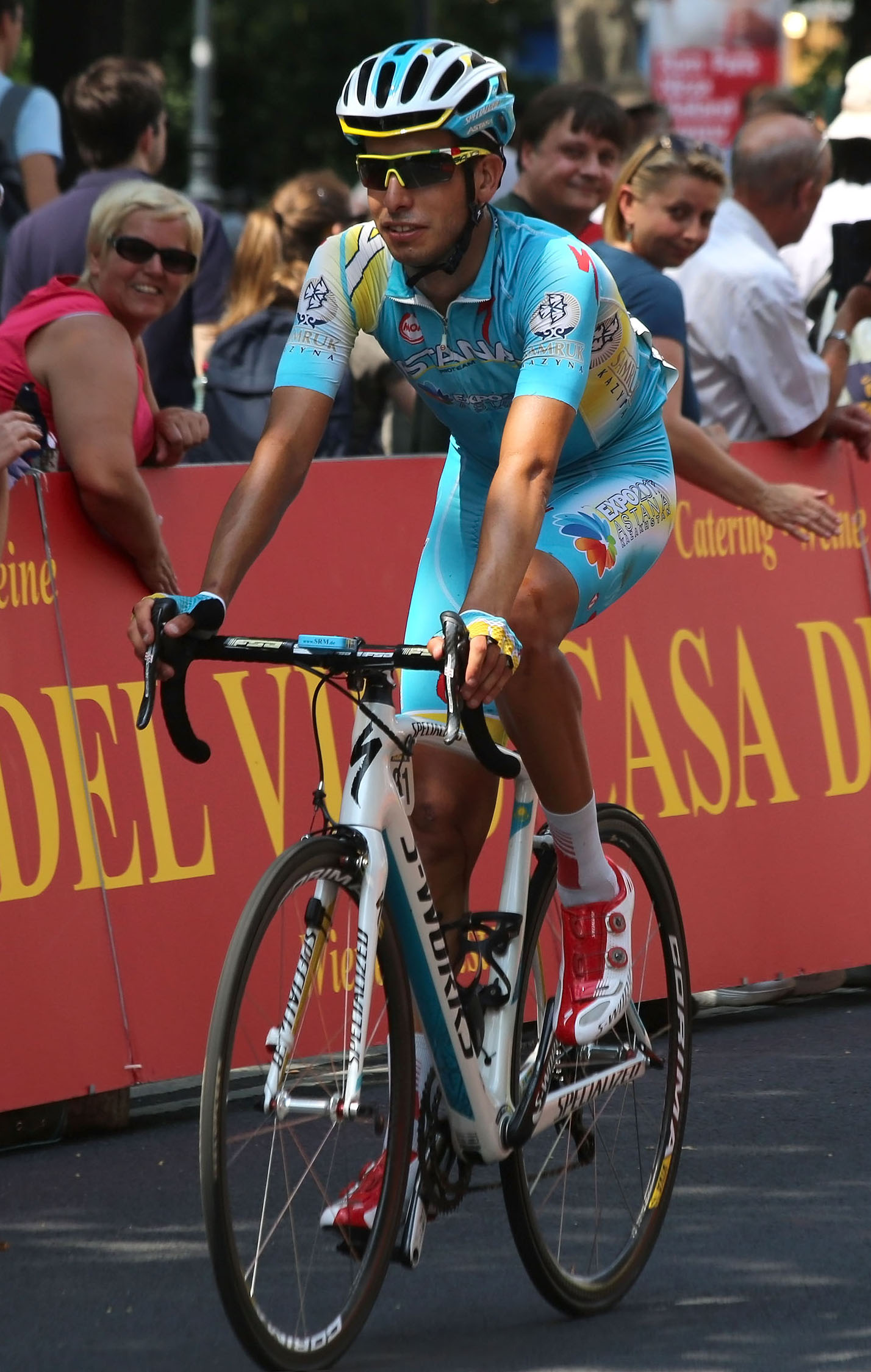
Fabio Aru (Astana) attacked in the final kilometres and put time into all his general classification rivals (photograph from the 2013 Tour of Austria).

The seventh stage included the most significant summit finish of the race so far. The route started in Jódar and travelled 191.1 kilometres (118.7 mi) to La Alpujarra. The route was generally south, looping around the western part of the Sierra Nevada and finishing on the edge of the mountain range. The roads were up and down all day, though there were only two categorised climbs. The first of these was the Puerto de los Blancares (9 kilometres (5.6 mi) at 3.3%), the summit of which came after 87 kilometres (54 mi). The next 85 kilometres (53 mi) also followed roads that consistently went up and down, with very few flat sections. The final climb started 18.7 kilometres (11.6 mi) before the finish line and had an average gradient of 5%. This was the Alto de Capileira, which was rated as a first-category climb. The climb came in three sections: the first 6 kilometres (3.7 mi) climbed consistently; there were then around 4 kilometres (2.5 mi) of fairly flat roads; the final 8.7 kilometres (5.4 mi) were the steepest part of the climb, with sections of around 14% towards the top.

The breakaway was quick to form, with five riders going on the attack. These were Carlos Quintero (Colombia), Amets Txurruka (Caja Rural), Ilia Koshevoy (Lampre-Mérida), Bert-Jan Lindeman (LottoNL-Jumbo) and Jérôme Cousin (Europcar). The teams in the peloton, especially Orica–GreenEDGE, were not willing to expend significant effort and the gap was nearly eight minutes after 30 kilometres (19 mi) of racing. This increased further and at one point exceeded thirteen minutes. Shortly after this, however, work from Movistar began to reduce the advantage. A large number of riders were dropped from the peloton under Movistar's pressure and the gap fell to five minutes. The pressure continued until the flat section midway up the climb; here their pressure eased and Astana began to take responsibility for the chase.

Cousin was the first of the riders in the breakaway to attack. Txurruka brought him back, but the acceleration was too much for Quintero, who was dropped from the break. Koshevoy then attacked several times; he dropped Txurruka, but Cousin and Lindeman were able to follow him and the breakaway was reduced to three riders. It was reduced further when there was a collision in the final 2 kilometres (1.2 mi) between Cousin and Koshevoy; Koshevoy was able to continue, but Cousin was dropped from the break. Lindeman attacked with about 200 metres (656 ft) remaining to the finish and took the victory by nine seconds. The victory was Lindeman's first World Tour victory.

In the main peloton, Dan Martin was the first to attack, but he was quickly brought back by a group of riders. A significant attack then came from Fabio Aru, who immediately won a gap ahead of the other riders in the group. Aru went past Cousin and finished the stage third, 29" behind Lindeman. The main group of general classification riders came in seven seconds behind Aru. Aru's attack, however, had dropped a large number of riders from the group, including Chris Froome, Mikel Landa and Tejay van Garderen. Froome fell out of the top ten. Chaves, however, finished in the main group and retained his lead in the general classification. His sixth-place finish also won him enough points to move into the lead of the points classification. Aru moved up two places into eighth; Domenico Pozzovivo (AG2R La Mondiale) also entered the top ten.

Result of stage 7
Rank	Rider	Team	Time
1	Bert-Jan Lindeman (NED)	LottoNL–Jumbo	5hr 10' 24"
2	Ilia Koshevoy (BLR)	Lampre–Merida	+ 9"
3	Fabio Aru (ITA)	Astana	+ 29"
4	Jérôme Cousin (FRA)	Team Europcar	+ 34"
5	Rafał Majka (POL)	Tinkoff–Saxo	+ 36"
6	Esteban Chaves (COL)	Orica–GreenEDGE	+ 36"
7	Alejandro Valverde (ESP)	Movistar Team	+ 36"
8	Nairo Quintana (COL)	Movistar Team	+ 36"
9	Louis Meintjes (RSA)	MTN–Qhubeka	+ 36"
10	Nicolas Roche (IRL)	Team Sky	+ 36"
Source: ProCyclingStats

General classification after stage 7
Rank	Rider	Team	Time
1	Esteban Chaves (COL)	Orica–GreenEDGE	27hr 06' 13"
2	Tom Dumoulin (NED)	Team Giant–Alpecin	+ 10"
3	Dan Martin (IRL)	Cannondale–Garmin	+ 33"
4	Nicolas Roche (IRL)	Team Sky	+ 36"
5	Alejandro Valverde (ESP)	Movistar Team	+ 49"
6	Joaquim Rodríguez (ESP)	Team Katusha	+ 56"
7	Nairo Quintana (COL)	Movistar Team	+ 57"
8	Fabio Aru (ITA)	Astana	+ 57"
9	Daniel Moreno (ESP)	Team Katusha	+ 1' 18"
10	Domenico Pozzovivo (ITA)	AG2R La Mondiale	+ 1' 19"
Source: ProCyclingStats

== Stage 8 ==
29 August 2015 — Puebla de Don Fadrique to Murcia, 182.5 km (113 mi)

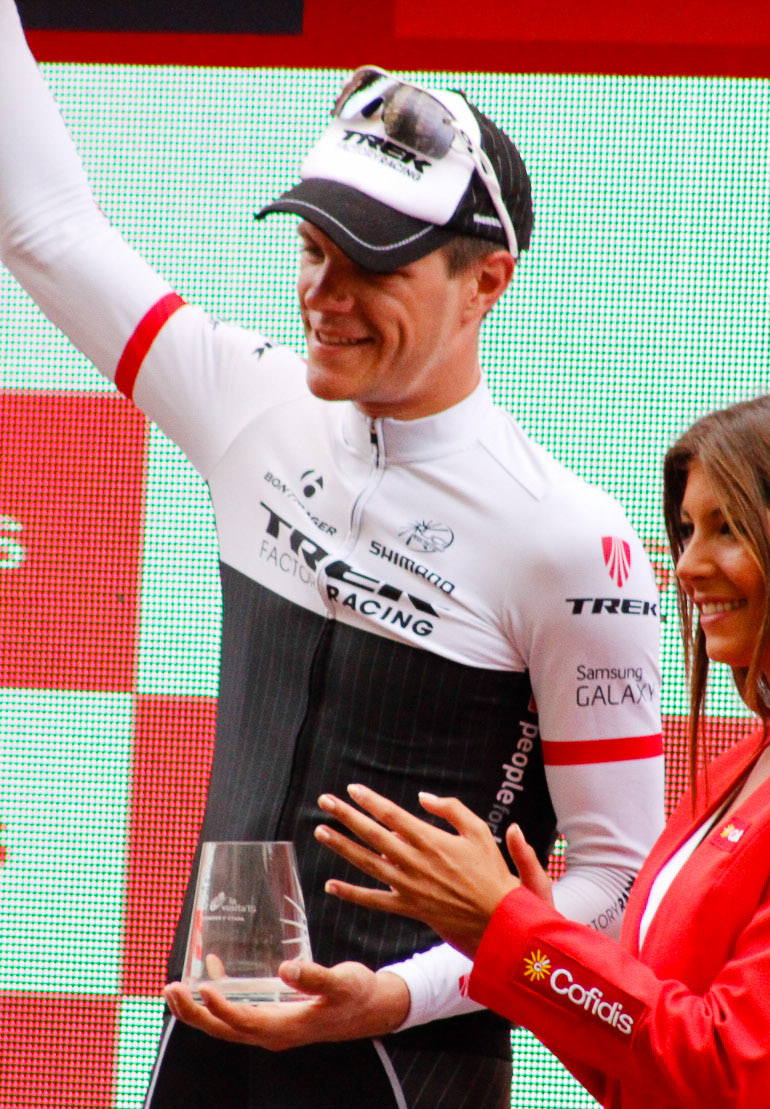
Jasper Stuyven (Trek Factory Racing) on the podium after winning stage 8 despite breaking his scaphoid bone earlier in the stage.

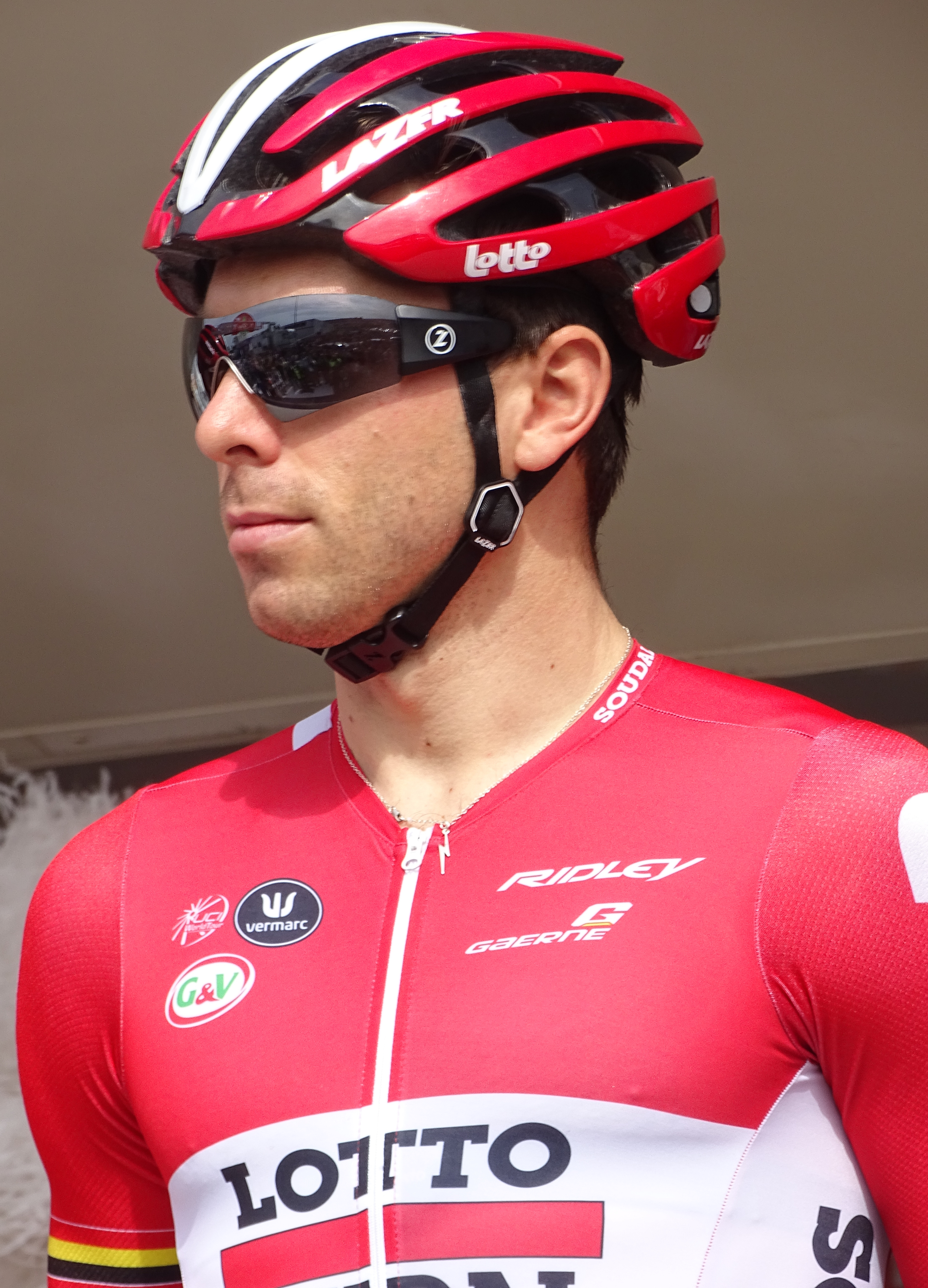
Kris Boeckmans (Lotto–Soudal) withdrew from the Vuelta with significant injuries (photographed at the 2015 Grand Prix de Denain).

The eighth stage was a 182.5-kilometre (113.4 mi) stage from Puebla de Don Fadrique in the province of Granada to Murcia, the home town of Alejandro Valverde. The first 110 kilometres (68 mi) of the stage were generally downhill. This was followed by a section of flat roads before the riders arrived in Murcia. After passing through an intermediate sprint, the riders left the town for two laps of an 18.7-kilometre (11.6 mi) circuit. This included the third-category climb of the Alto de la Cresta del Gallo (4.2 kilometres (2.6 mi) at 7.5%). After the second lap, there were about 13 kilometres (8.1 mi) of flat roads, after which the riders returned to the centre of Murcia for the stage finish. The stage was expected to be too difficult for the sprinters.

The stage's early breakaway was formed of six riders: Alex Howes (Cannondale-Garmin), Iljo Keisse (Etixx-Quick-Step), Jimmy Engoulvent (Europcar), Tom Van Asbroeck (LottoNL-Jumbo), Jasper De Buyst (Lotto-Soudal), and Ángel Madrazo (Colombia). They built a lead of nearly five minutes, but Giant-Alpecin and Tinkoff-Saxo controlled their advantage throughout. The first major incident of the day was a crash that came 48 kilometres (30 mi) from the finish line, as the peloton approached the first of the day's climbs. This involved more than twenty riders. Four riders were forced to withdraw from the race: Tejay van Garderen (BMC), Dan Martin (Cannondale-Garmin), Kris Boeckmans (Lotto-Soudal) and Nacer Bouhanni (Cofidis). Van Garderen suffered a broken shoulder and Martin a broken clavicle. Boeckmans had been at the origin of the crash: he was drinking from a bidon when he hit a hole in the road and fell hard to the ground. He suffered a range of injuries, including facial trauma and fractures, a concussion, broken ribs and a pneumothorax; he was taken to hospital and placed in an induced coma. He remained in the coma for over a week; he left hospital several weeks later following major facial surgery. Among the other riders delayed in the crash were Chaves, the race leader, and Jasper Stuyven (Trek Factory Racing).

The breakaway's lead was reduced to less than two minutes at the foot of the first climb. Howes attacked alone, with Madrazo following. On the descent, however, Howes fell. He was passed by Madrazo and by the peloton, which had caught the remainder of the breakaway. On the flat section that followed the climb, several groups, including that of Chaves, came back together. Niki Terpstra (Etixx-Quick Step) attacked, but was soon caught and passed by his teammate Gianluca Brambilla, who was part of a four-man group that formed on the final ascent of the day. Tom Dumoulin attempted to control the peloton on the climb, but there were attacks from various riders including some of the general classification favourites. After the descent, the groups came back together and the lead group was formed of approximately 40 riders.

Another breakaway was then formed by José Gonçalves (Caja Rural–Seguros RGA), Kenny Elissonde (FDJ) and Alberto Losada (Katusha); although they gained a lead of nearly 20 seconds, they were brought back by Trek and Tinkoff-Saxo. With 8.2 kilometres (5.1 mi) remaining, there was another crash. This involved Peter Sagan, who was hit from behind by a motorbike belonging to the Shimano neutral service team and knocked to the ground with leg injuries. Following the incident, Sagan gestured towards the motorbike and appeared to kick his own bike and to punch the medical car. He was dropped from the lead group and was unable to contest the sprint.

One last attack came from Adam Hansen (Lotto-Soudal) with 1.5 kilometres (0.9 mi) remaining, but he was unable to escape the bunch. The stage therefore came down to a sprint, which was won by Jasper Stuyven, with Pello Bilbao (Caja Rural–Seguros RGA) second and Kévin Reza (FDJ) third. This was the first win of Stuyven's professional career. Except for Dan Martin's withdrawal, there were no significant changes to the standings in the general classification.

Following the stage, however, it was announced by Trek Factory Racing that Stuyven had suffered a broken scaphoid in the first major crash and he was forced to withdraw from the race. Sagan was also forced to abandon the Vuelta after the stage, as he had suffered cuts and burns on his left side and a contusion in his left arm. Sagan was also fined €300 for his behaviour following the crash, while the rider of the motorbike was excluded from the remainder of the Vuelta.

Result of stage 8
Rank	Rider	Team	Time
1	Jasper Stuyven (BEL)	Trek Factory Racing	4hr 06' 05"
2	Pello Bilbao (ESP)	Caja Rural–Seguros RGA	+ 0"
3	Kévin Reza (FRA)	FDJ	+ 0"
4	Giovanni Visconti (ITA)	Movistar Team	+ 0"
5	Kristian Sbaragli (ITA)	MTN–Qhubeka	+ 0"
6	Tosh Van der Sande (BEL)	Lotto–Soudal	+ 0"
7	Julien Simon (FRA)	Cofidis	+ 0"
8	Pieter Serry (BEL)	Etixx–Quick-Step	+ 0"
9	José Joaquín Rojas (ESP)	Movistar Team	+ 0"
10	Nicolas Roche (IRL)	Team Sky	+ 0"
Source: ProCyclingStats

General classification after stage 8
Rank	Rider	Team	Time
1	Esteban Chaves (COL)	Orica–GreenEDGE	31hr 12' 18"
2	Tom Dumoulin (NED)	Team Giant–Alpecin	+ 10"
3	Nicolas Roche (IRL)	Team Sky	+ 36"
4	Alejandro Valverde (ESP)	Movistar Team	+ 49"
5	Joaquim Rodríguez (ESP)	Team Katusha	+ 56"
6	Nairo Quintana (COL)	Movistar Team	+ 57"
7	Fabio Aru (ITA)	Astana	+ 57"
8	Daniel Moreno (ESP)	Team Katusha	+ 1' 18"
9	Domenico Pozzovivo (ITA)	AG2R La Mondiale	+ 1' 19"
10	Mikel Nieve (ESP)	Team Sky	+ 1' 21"
Source: ProCyclingStats

== Stage 9 ==
30 August 2015 — Torrevieja to Cumbre del Sol, Benitachell, 168.3 km (105 mi)

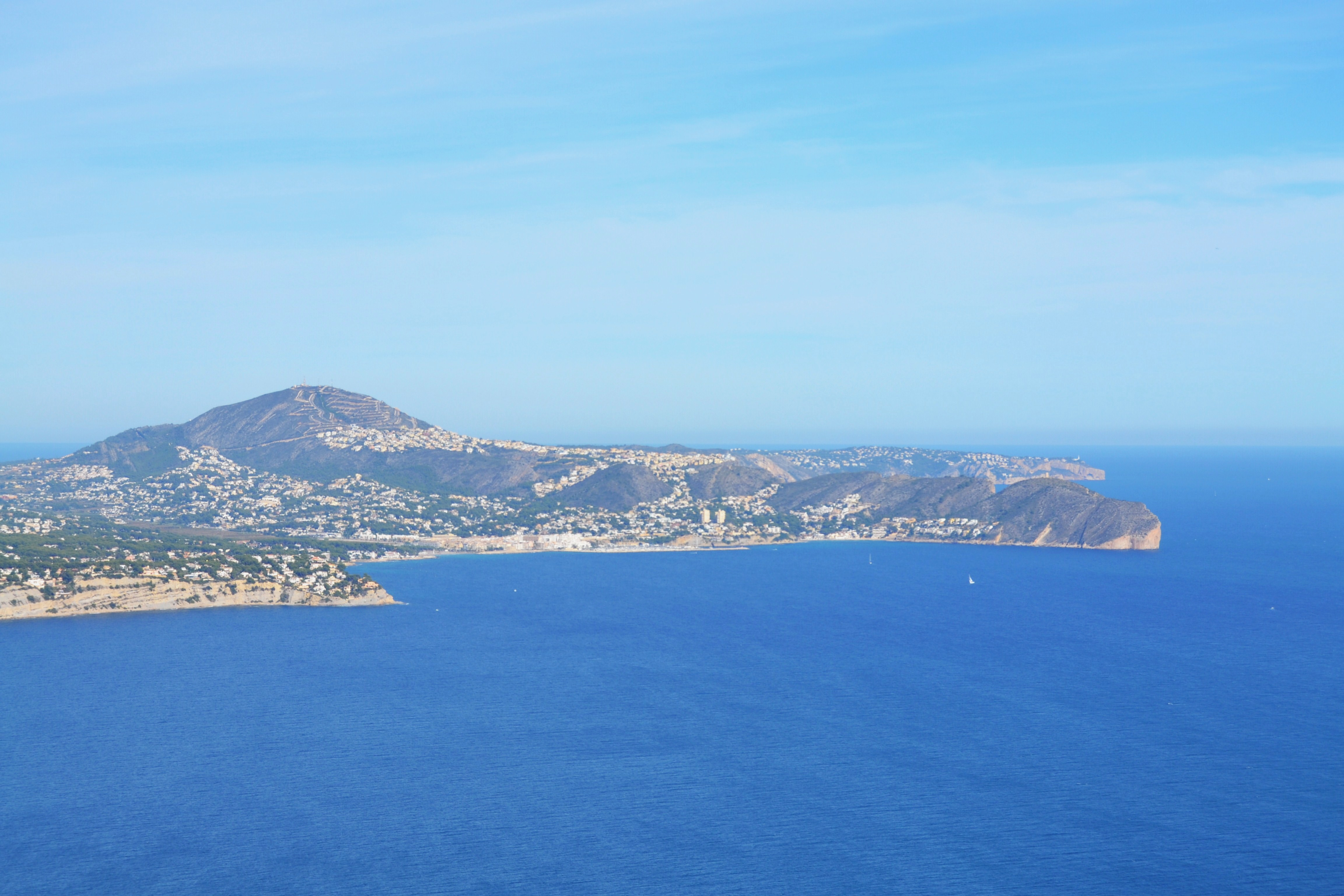
Stage 9 finished on the summit of the Alto al Puig Llorença above Benitachell.

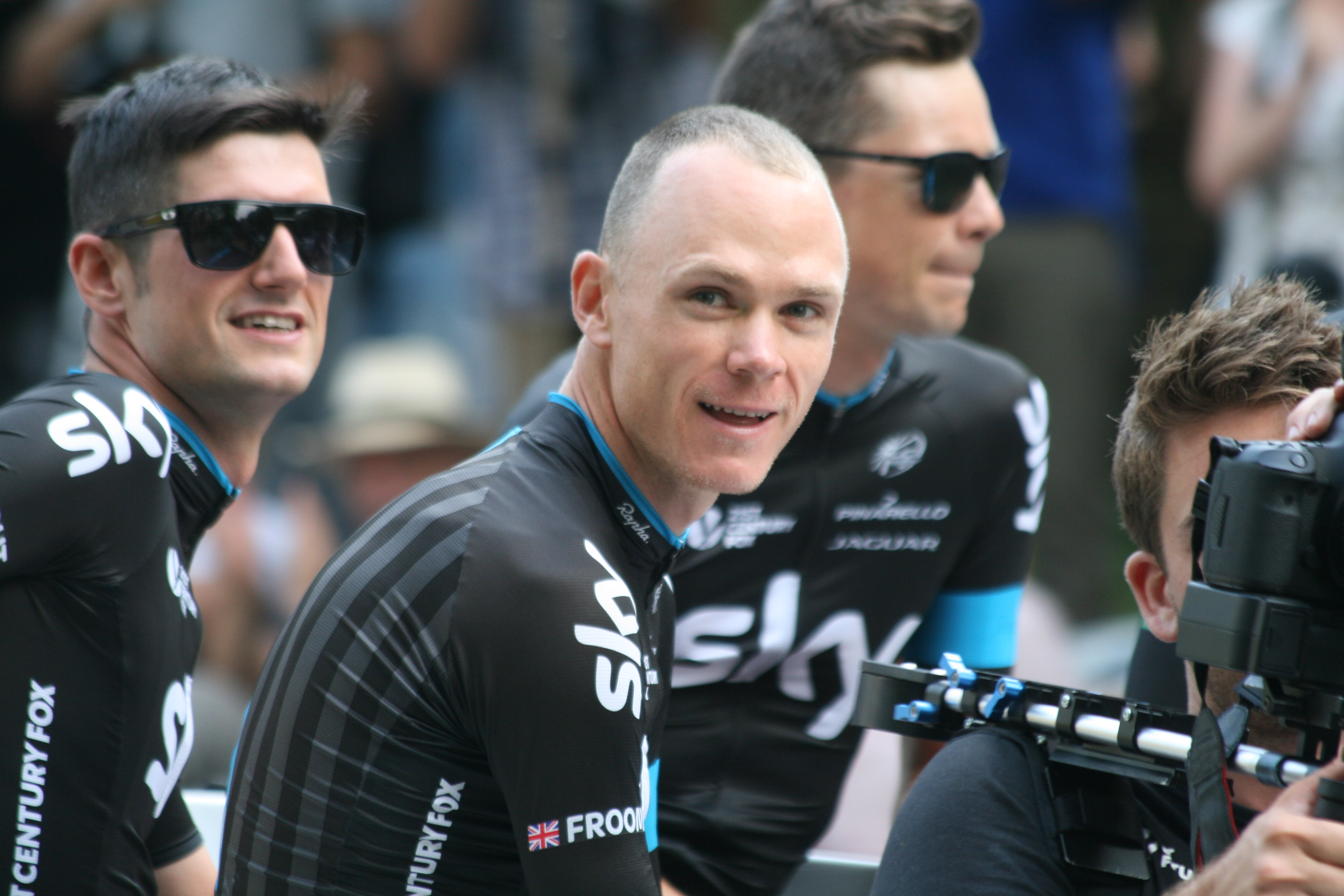
Chris Froome (Team Sky, centre) came close to winning stage 9 and moved back into the top ten overall (photograph from the 2015 Tour de France).

The ninth stage took the riders 168.3 kilometres (104.6 mi) along the coast (the Costa Blanca) from Torrevieja to a summit finish on the Alto de Puig Llorença (also known as the Cumbre del Sol) outside Benitachell. The first 130 kilometres (81 mi) of the stage were fairly straightforward, with no significant climbs. After this, however, the riders entered a complex sequence of roads around the finishing town. First they climbed the first 3.3 kilometres (2.1 mi) of the Alto de Puig Llorença, then descended for a 40-kilometre (25 mi) loop to the north of Benitachell. They then returned to the same roads that they had used earlier, but continued for the full length of the climb (4.1 kilometres (2.5 mi) at 8.9%). The climb was expected to suit the punchy climbers.

The early breakaway included fourteen riders. These were Alexis Gougeard (AG2R La Mondiale), Nikolas Maes, Pieter Serry and Maxime Bouet (all Etixx-Quick Step), Geraint Thomas (Sky), Lorenzo Manzin (FDJ), Mattia Cattaneo (Lampre-Mérida), Yoann Bagot (Cofidis), Maarten Tjallingii (LottoNL-Jumbo), Omar Fraile (Caja Rural), Tony Hurel (Europcar), Danny van Poppel (Trek Factory Racing), Pavel Brutt (Tinkoff-Saxo) and Songezo Jim (MTN-Qhubeka). The breakaway's lead was over five minutes at one point, but was gradually reduced as the peloton approached the final climb of the day; Katusha did most of the work through the day on behalf of Joaquim Rodríguez. The breakaway led over the first, partial climb of the Alto de Puig Llorença, with Fraile the first to the top of the climb to extend his lead in the mountains classification.

The breakaway was eventually caught at the bottom of the final climb. Valverde, who had crashed earlier in the day, was the first to attack. As soon as he was caught, his teammate Nairo Quintana put in his own attack. These attacks dropped Chris Froome from the front group. Dumoulin was the next to attack, seeking to take back the race lead from Chaves. Chaves and Quintana initially followed him, but were soon dropped. Valverde was also unable to follow the pace, but Froome had kept a steady pace and by this point was leading the chase of Dumoulin.

Dumoulin led the race under the flamme rouge with Froome chasing; Rodríguez was by this point the only rider able to stay with Froome. As soon as the two riders caught Dumoulin, Froome attacked again and briefly held the lead. Dumoulin was stronger in the final, steep 200 metres (660 ft). He caught Froome and came around to take the stage win and the race lead, finishing 2" ahead of Froome. Rodríguez was a further 3" behind, with significant time gaps to the other general classification riders. Chaves finished in fifteenth place, nearly a minute behind Dumoulin, and fell to third on the general classification.

Result of stage 9
Rank	Rider	Team	Time
1	Tom Dumoulin (NED)	Team Giant–Alpecin	4hr 09' 55"
2	Chris Froome (GBR)	Team Sky	+ 2"
3	Joaquim Rodríguez (ESP)	Team Katusha	+ 5"
4	Fabio Aru (ITA)	Astana	+ 16"
5	Rafał Majka (POL)	Tinkoff–Saxo	+ 18"
6	Nairo Quintana (COL)	Movistar Team	+ 20"
7	Alejandro Valverde (ESP)	Movistar Team	+ 28"
8	Nicolas Roche (IRL)	Team Sky	+ 31"
9	Domenico Pozzovivo (ITA)	AG2R La Mondiale	+ 33"
10	Louis Meintjes (RSA)	MTN–Qhubeka	+ 34"
Source: ProCyclingStats

General classification after stage 9
Rank	Rider	Team	Time
1	Tom Dumoulin (NED)	Team Giant–Alpecin	35hr 22' 13"
2	Joaquim Rodríguez (ESP)	Team Katusha	+ 57"
3	Esteban Chaves (COL)	Orica–GreenEDGE	+ 59"
4	Nicolas Roche (IRL)	Team Sky	+ 1' 07"
5	Fabio Aru (ITA)	Astana	+ 1' 13"
6	Alejandro Valverde (ESP)	Movistar Team	+ 1' 17"
7	Nairo Quintana (COL)	Movistar Team	+ 1' 17"
8	Chris Froome (GBR)	Team Sky	+ 1' 18"
9	Rafał Majka (POL)	Tinkoff–Saxo	+ 1' 47"
10	Domenico Pozzovivo (ITA)	AG2R La Mondiale	+ 1' 52"
Source: ProCyclingStats

== Stage 10 ==
31 August 2015 — Valencia to Castellón de la Plana, 146.6 km (91 mi)

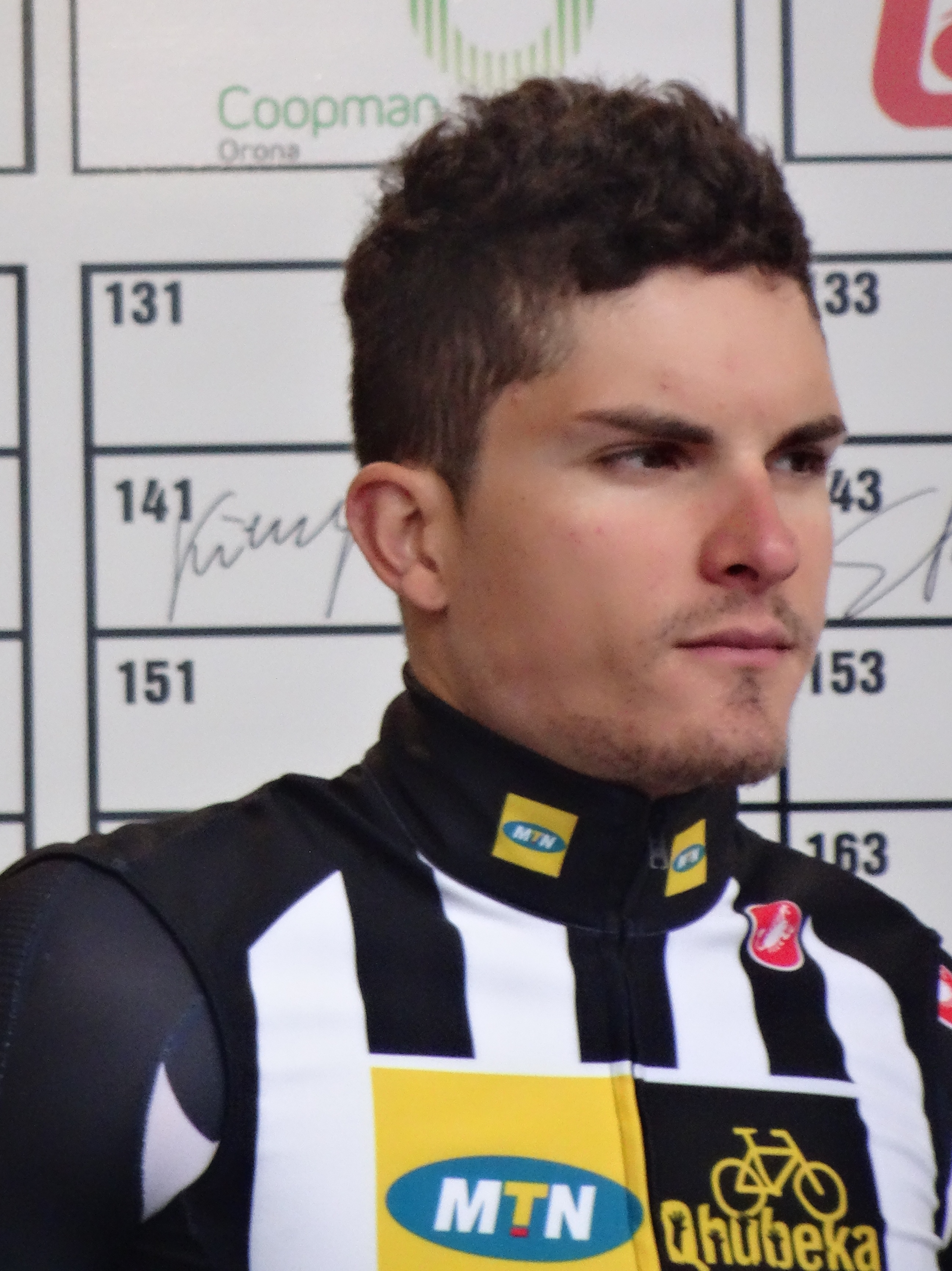
Kristian Sbaragli (MTN–Qhubeka) won stage 10, his first Grand Tour stage win (photograph from the 2015 Kuurne–Brussels–Kuurne).

The tenth stage was the final one before the first rest day. It was a 146.6-kilometre (91.1 mi) route from Valencia to Castellón de la Plana. The stage again travelled north between two coastal towns; this stage, however, took an inland, hillier route. The first of the day's two climbs was the third-category Puerto del Oronet (6 kilometres (3.7 mi) at 4.4%). After the descent from the climb, there were more hilly roads before another descent to sea level. There were then around 40 kilometres (25 mi) of flat roads, taking the riders through Castellón and out again to the north, before the day's second climb. This was the second-category Alto del Desierto de las Palmas (7 kilometres (4.3 mi) at 5.6%). From the top of the climb there were 17 kilometres (11 mi) of descent and flat roads to the finish line. The stage was expected to suit the sprinters.

The breakaway took some time to form; on the first climb of the day, a group of 40 riders went clear, including at least one rider from every team in the race. The group was never allowed to get clear, with Giant-Alpecin and Movistar determined to set up the stage victory for their sprinters. The breakaway's lead was consistently around one minute, with various riders dropping back to the main group and others attacking. The breakaway was caught with 55 kilometres (34 mi) remaining in the stage. Niki Terpstra attacked, as he had done on several other stages, but was not able to escape the peloton, which came into the final climb together. Nicolas Roche (Sky) was involved in a crash on a roundabout and received treatment from the medical car as his teammates helped him back into the main pack.

There were several attacks on the climb. The first of these came from Alessandro De Marchi (BMC), with Romain Sicard (Europcar) following him. A second attack came from Kenny Elissonde (FDJ) and Jérôme Coppel (IAM Cycling). Elissonde caught and passed Sicard and De Marchi and set off alone. Another attack came from Gianluca Brambilla (Etixx-Quick Step), while Dumoulin himself was leading the peloton in order to defend his race lead and set up the sprint for Degenkolb, his teammate. De Marchi and Sicard caught Elissonde at the top of the climb, where they were around 30" ahead of the peloton. Sergio Henao (Sky) who had suffered a puncture before the climb and was riding hard to get back into the peloton, crashed on the descent and lost his bike over the side of the road; he lost several minutes and fell from fourteenth place overall to twenty-sixth.

At the foot of the climb, the leading group only had a small advantage over the peloton and were soon caught. There were no lead-out trains in the final kilometres, with fewer than 60 riders left in the group. Tosh Van der Sande (Lotto-Soudal) was the first to sprint, but Kristian Sbaragli (MTN-Qhubeka) came past him and took the stage victory. Degenkolb was the quickest in the final metres, but he had been badly positioned and was only able to finish second. José Joaquín Rojas (Movistar) finished third. The stage was Sbaragli's first win in over two years. It was the second win of his career and the first in a Grand Tour.

Result of stage 10
Rank	Rider	Team	Time
1	Kristian Sbaragli (ITA)	MTN–Qhubeka	3hr 12' 43"
2	John Degenkolb (GER)	Team Giant–Alpecin	+ 0"
3	José Joaquín Rojas (ESP)	Movistar Team	+ 0"
4	Tosh Van der Sande (BEL)	Lotto–Soudal	+ 0"
5	José Gonçalves (POR)	Caja Rural–Seguros RGA	+ 0"
6	Matteo Montaguti (ITA)	AG2R La Mondiale	+ 0"
7	Jens Keukeleire (BEL)	Orica–GreenEDGE	+ 0"
8	Daryl Impey (RSA)	Orica–GreenEDGE	+ 0"
9	Pieter Serry (BEL)	Etixx–Quick-Step	+ 0"
10	Valerio Conti (ITA)	Lampre–Merida	+ 0"
Source: ProCyclingStats

General classification after stage 10
Rank	Rider	Team	Time
1	Tom Dumoulin (NED)	Team Giant–Alpecin	38hr 34' 56"
2	Joaquim Rodríguez (ESP)	Team Katusha	+ 57"
3	Esteban Chaves (COL)	Orica–GreenEDGE	+ 59"
4	Nicolas Roche (IRL)	Team Sky	+ 1' 07"
5	Fabio Aru (ITA)	Astana	+ 1' 13"
6	Alejandro Valverde (ESP)	Movistar Team	+ 1' 17"
7	Nairo Quintana (COL)	Movistar Team	+ 1' 17"
8	Chris Froome (GBR)	Team Sky	+ 1' 18"
9	Rafał Majka (POL)	Tinkoff–Saxo	+ 1' 47"
10	Domenico Pozzovivo (ITA)	AG2R La Mondiale	+ 1' 52"
Source: ProCyclingStats

== Stage 11 ==
2 September 2015 — Andorra la Vella to Cortals d'Encamp, 138 km (86 mi)

Profile of stage 11

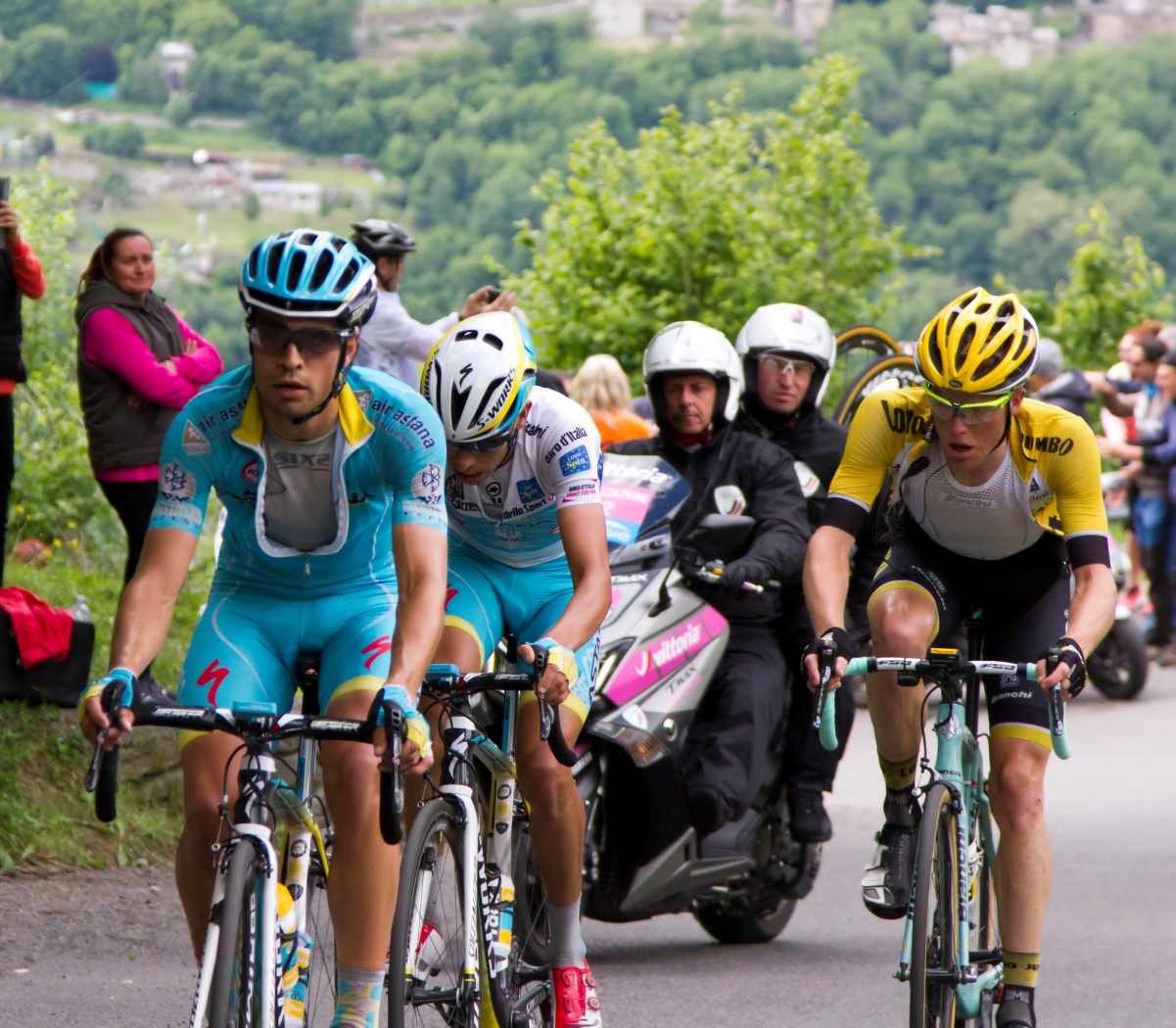
Mikel Landa leading Fabio Aru (both Astana) at the 2015 Giro d'Italia. They finished first and second respectively on stage 11 of the Vuelta.

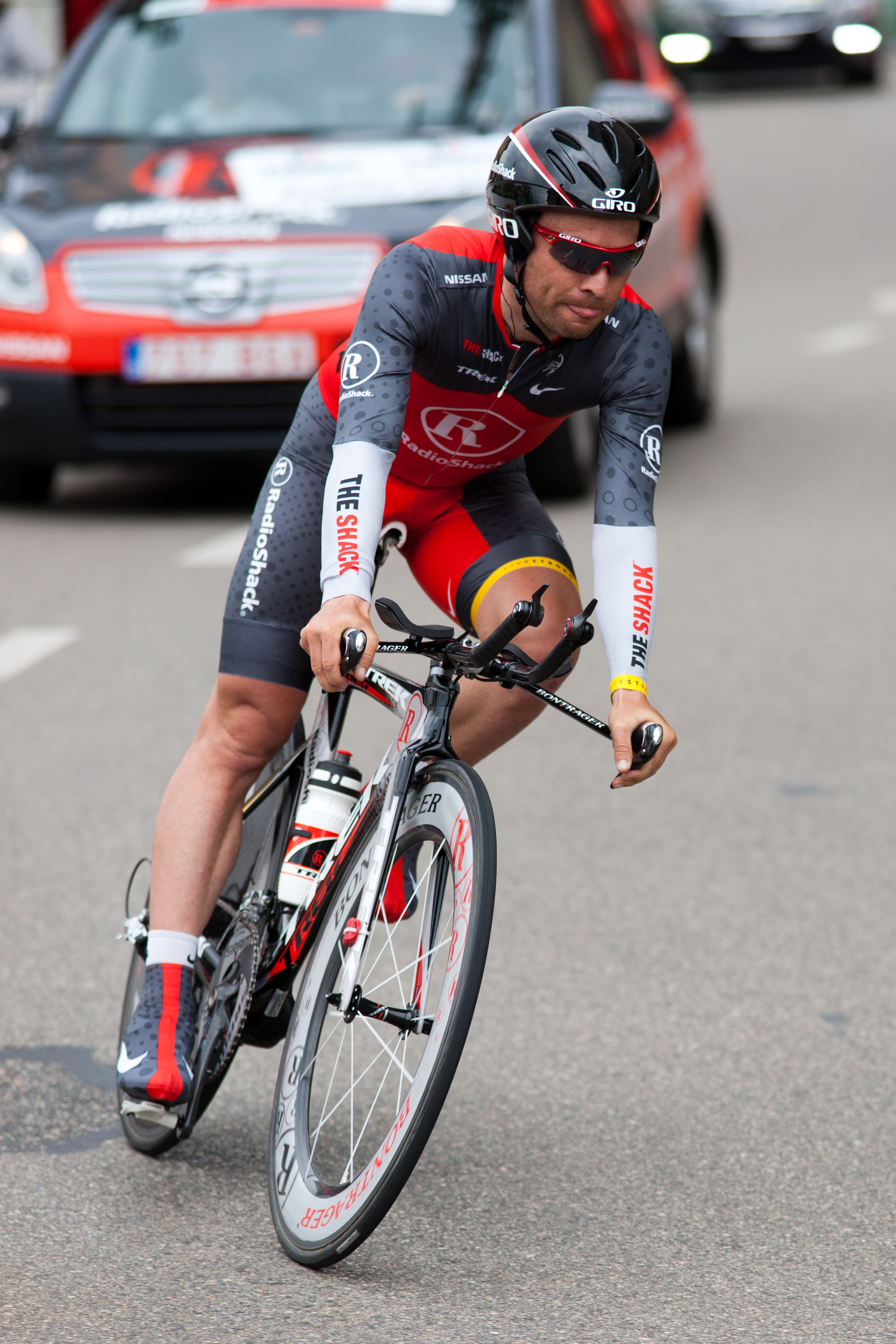
Sérgio Paulinho (Tinkoff–Saxo) was forced to withdraw from the race after being hit by a motorbike (photograph from the 2010 Tour de Romandie).

The eleventh stage came after the first rest day of the Vuelta and a transfer to Andorra la Vella. Although a short stage at just 138 kilometres (86 mi), it was very difficult, with six categorised climbs and few flat roads. It started in Andorra la Vella and immediately climbed the first-category Collada de Beixalis (6.5 kilometres (4.0 mi) at 8.7%). After the descent and some false flat, the riders climbed the first-category Coll D'Ordino (9.9 kilometres (6.2 mi) at 7%), followed by another long descent past Andorra la Vella and onto the next first-category climb, the Coll de la Rabassa (13.8 kilometres (8.6 mi) at 6.6%). Following the descent, the riders climbed the hardest climb of the day, the especial-category Collada de la Gallina (11.7 kilometres (7.3 mi) at 8.5%). After the descent, the riders once again went past Andorra la Vella (this time climbing the second-category Alto de la Cormella on the way) to reach the foot of the final climb. This was the Alto Els Cortals d'Encamp and was 8.7 kilometres (5.4 mi) at 9.1%. The stage was designed by Joaquim Rodríguez; before the stage, he described it as "dramatic". The manager of Movistar, Eusebio Unzué, described it as "the toughest Vuelta stage that he has seen in more than 30 years". Javier Guillén, the race director, agreed, describing it as "possibly the hardest stage we have ever put together in terms of the amount of climbing involved".

The first significant moment came in the approach to the Collada de Beixalis, the first climb of the day. Chris Froome hit a wooden barrier and then a wall, injuring his left shoulder and knee and his right foot. He was dropped from the lead group and, with the help of teammates, started a long chase back to the leading group. The first riders to attack were Romain Sicard (Europcar) and Darwin Atapuma (BMC); they were followed by seventeen other riders, including Fraile, the leader of the mountains classification. They led over the summit of the climb, with Fraile the first over the summit to extend his lead in the classification. Froome regained contact with the main group on the descent from the climb.

There was another significant incident at the bottom of the first climb. This involved Sérgio Paulinho (Tinkoff-Saxo): he collided with a race motorbike, causing significant cuts to his leg. Paulinho first attempted to continue riding; he was then treated by the race doctor, who put staples in his leg. He lay down on the road for treatment. Although he attempted to continue riding, he was forced to withdraw from the race just before the summit of the climb; he then went to hospital and received seventeen stitches. Paulinho's teammate Peter Sagan had also been hit by a motorbike on stage 8 and the team had issued a statement calling for an apology from the race organisers and measures to prevent such incidents. Following Paulinho's incident, Oleg Tinkov, the team's owner, suggested on Twitter that the team may withdraw from the race; a statement from the team after the stage said, "the team will consider whether it is safe to continue racing under the current arrangements".

Rubén Plaza (Lampre-Mérida) led the breakaway over the second climb of the day, with Fraile second. The breakaway was around two minutes ahead of the peloton. Imanol Erviti (Movistar) attacked on the descent and led the race solo for some distance; he was first to reach the summit of the next climb, the Coll de la Rabassa, with Fraile again second. He was eventually brought back by work from Mikel Landa (Astana) on the descent. On the Coll de la Gallina the breakaway broke up: the lead group was formed of Landa and Fraile, along with Ian Boswell (Sky), Romain Sicard (Europcar), Nelson Oliveira (Lampre-Mérida), Darwin Atapuma (BMC) and Paweł Poljański (Tinkoff-Saxo). Fraile was first over the summit. The climb also caused difficulty in the main group: Chris Froome was unable to stay in the group; his injured shoulder was treated at the medical car and he was then guided through the rest of the stage by Geraint Thomas. Froome lost two minutes on the climb. Nicolas Roche was also dropped from the lead group and Mikel Nieve took over the leadership of Team Sky.

On the descent, Valverde and Rodríguez attacked and were joined by teammates from the breakaway. They had a 40-second advantage over a group containing Dumoulin and Fabio Aru. Aru's teammate Dario Cataldo was able to bring him back to Valverde and Rodríguez; Dumoulin was then also able to return to the group.

Landa attacked the breakaway at the bottom of the final climb, while Aru attacked the group of favourites at approximately the same point. Aru was followed by Valverde and Rodríguez, but another attack 6 kilometres (3.7 mi) from the finish left him alone. Landa, meanwhile, had taken his team radio earpiece out and was ignoring instructions from his team to drop back and assist Aru. Landa rode alone to the top of the climb and took the stage victory. Aru caught and passed Ian Boswell – the only other rider remaining from the breakaway – and finished the stage 1' 22" behind Landa. Boswell took third place, while Rodríguez was the first of Aru's general classification rivals to finish, 37" behind him. Tom Dumoulin and Esteban Chaves finished together, losing nearly two minutes. Aru therefore took the lead of the general classification, 27" ahead of Rodríguez, with Dumoulin 3" further back in third. Quintana was also dropped on the climb, losing nearly three minutes to Aru, and fell to ninth on the general classification; he later revealed that he had been suffering from a fever. Froome, meanwhile, finished nearly nine minutes down and struggled to put weight on his foot after the stage. An MRI scan revealed a break in his foot and he withdrew from the Vuelta the following morning.

Result of stage 11
Rank	Rider	Team	Time
1	Mikel Landa (ESP)	Astana	4hr 34' 54"
2	Fabio Aru (ITA)	Astana	+ 1' 22"
3	Ian Boswell (USA)	Team Sky	+ 1' 40"
4	Daniel Moreno (ESP)	Team Katusha	+ 1' 57"
5	Joaquim Rodríguez (ESP)	Team Katusha	+ 1' 59"
6	Rafał Majka (POL)	Tinkoff–Saxo	+ 2' 10"
7	Mikel Nieve (ESP)	Team Sky	+ 2' 10"
8	Esteban Chaves (COL)	Orica–GreenEDGE	+ 2' 59"
9	Tom Dumoulin (NED)	Team Giant–Alpecin	+ 2' 59"
10	Diego Rosa (ITA)	Astana	+ 3' 02"
Source: ProCyclingStats

General classification after stage 11
Rank	Rider	Team	Time
1	Fabio Aru (ITA)	Astana	43h 12' 19"
2	Joaquim Rodríguez (ESP)	Team Katusha	+ 27"
3	Tom Dumoulin (NED)	Team Giant–Alpecin	+ 30"
4	Rafał Majka (POL)	Tinkoff–Saxo	+ 1' 28"
5	Esteban Chaves (COL)	Orica–GreenEDGE	+ 1' 29"
6	Alejandro Valverde (ESP)	Movistar Team	+ 1' 52"
7	Daniel Moreno (ESP)	Team Katusha	+ 1' 54"
8	Mikel Nieve (ESP)	Team Sky	+ 1' 58"
9	Nairo Quintana (COL)	Movistar Team	+ 3' 07"
10	Louis Meintjes (RSA)	MTN–Qhubeka	+ 4' 15"
Source: ProCyclingStats
