= Kris Boeckmans =

Belgian road racing cyclist

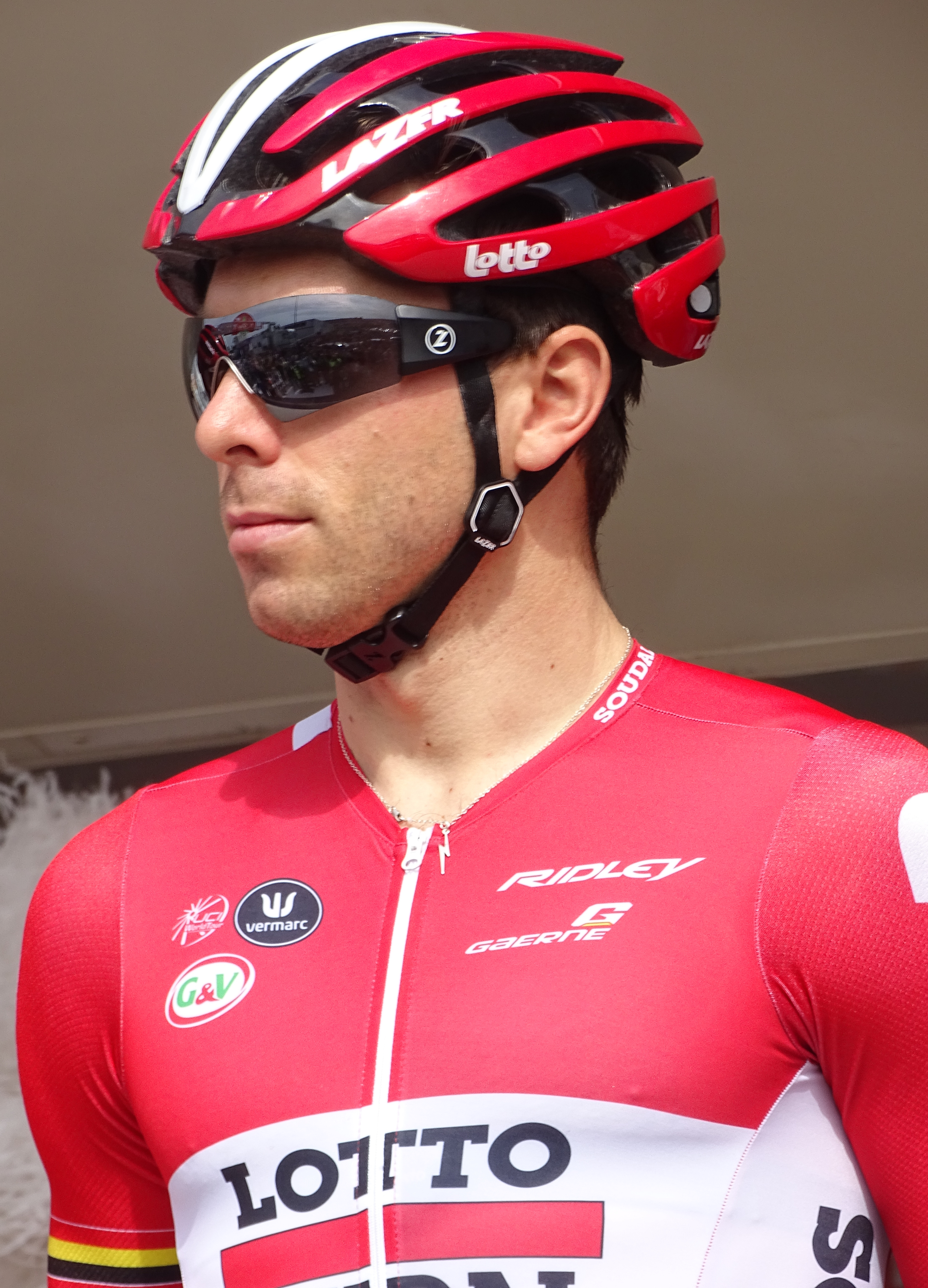
- Boeckmans at the 2015 Grand Prix de Denain

Personal information
- Full name: Kris Boeckmans
- Nickname: Boecki
- Born: 13 February 1987 (age 39) Malle, Belgium
- Height: 1.80 m (5 ft 11 in)
- Weight: 72.5 kg (160 lb)

Cycling career
- Sport: Cycling
- Current team: Retired
- Discipline: Road
- Role: Rider
- Rider type: Sprinter

Amateur teams
- 2006: Nieuwe Hoop Tielen
- 2007: CLC Team Ingelmunster
- 2008–2009: Davo
- 2009: Silence–Lotto (stagiaire)

Professional teams
- 2010–2011: Topsport Vlaanderen–Mercator
- 2012–2013: Vacansoleil–DCM
- 2014–2017: Lotto–Belisol
- 2018–2020: Vital Concept

Kris Boeckmans (born 13 February 1987) is a Belgian former professional road bicycle racer, who rode professionally between 2010 and 2020, for the Topsport Vlaanderen–Mercator, Vacansoleil–DCM, Lotto–Soudal and B&B Hotels–Vital Concept teams.

== Career ==
Born in Malle, Boeckmans began competing as a professional in the second half of the 2009 season, competing for the Silence–Lotto team as a stagiaire. He joined Topsport Vlaanderen–Mercator for the start of the 2010 season, remaining with the team until the end of 2011, when he joined the Vacansoleil–DCM squad for the 2012 season. Boeckmans made his Grand Tour début at the 2012 Tour de France, where he was earmarked as one of the squad's main sprint contenders, along with Kenny van Hummel; Boeckmans took his first top ten placing on stage 4, when he finished eighth on the stage.

After two years with Vacansoleil–DCM, Boeckemans left the team at the end of the 2013 season, to join Lotto–Belisol. He started the 2015 Vuelta a España. However, on the eighth stage, he was involved in a large crash: he was drinking from a bidon and hit a hole in the road, falling hard to the ground. According to Cyclingnews.com, he suffered "facial trauma and fractures, a concussion, broken ribs and a punctured lung" and was placed into an induced coma. He was kept in the coma for over a week and was eventually discharged around four weeks after the crash, following major facial surgery in Belgium.

== Major results ==
2007
2nd Zellik–Galmaarden
2008
1st GP Stad Vilvoorde
1st Stage 1b Vuelta a Navarra
5th Overall Tour de Berlin

1st Stage 1

7th ZLM Tour
9th Grand Prix de Waregem
10th Kattekoers
2009
1st Road race, UEC European Under-23 Road Championships
1st Overall Le Triptyque des Monts et Châteaux

1st Stage 2b

1st Schaal Sels
1st Stage 2 Vuelta a Navarra
2nd Overall Ronde van Antwerpen

1st Stages 1a (ITT) & 3

2nd Brussel–Zepperen
2nd Paris–Tours Espoirs
4th GP Raymond Impanis
5th Kattekoers
2010
1st Stage 5 Ster Elektrotoer
2nd Overall Driedaagse van West-Vlaanderen

1st Stage 3

2nd Nokere Koerse
7th Scheldeprijs
8th Omloop van het Waasland
8th Nationale Sluitingsprijs
9th Wanzele-Lede
10th Dwars door Drenthe
10th Grand Prix de Denain
2011
3rd Münsterland Giro
4th Puivelde Koerse
6th Sparkassen Giro Bochum
9th Omloop Gemeente Melle
2012
2nd Le Samyn
2nd Nokere Koerse
2013
2nd Le Samyn
5th Schaal Sels
6th Halle–Ingooigem
2014
2nd Halle–Ingooigem
2015
1st Overall Tour de Picardie

1st Stages 1 & 3

1st Overall World Ports Classic

1st Points classification
1st Stage 2

1st Le Samyn
1st Nokere Koerse
2nd Halle–Ingooigem
3rd Overall Étoile de Bessèges

1st Stage 1

2016
5th Kampioenschap van Vlaanderen
2018
5th Halle–Ingooigem
2019
6th Scheldeprijs

=== Grand Tour general classification results timeline ===
Grand Tour	2012	2013	2014	2015
Giro d'Italia	—	—	—	—
Tour de France	115	DNF	—	—
Vuelta a España	—	—	—	DNF
