= Johim Ariesen =

Dutch cyclist

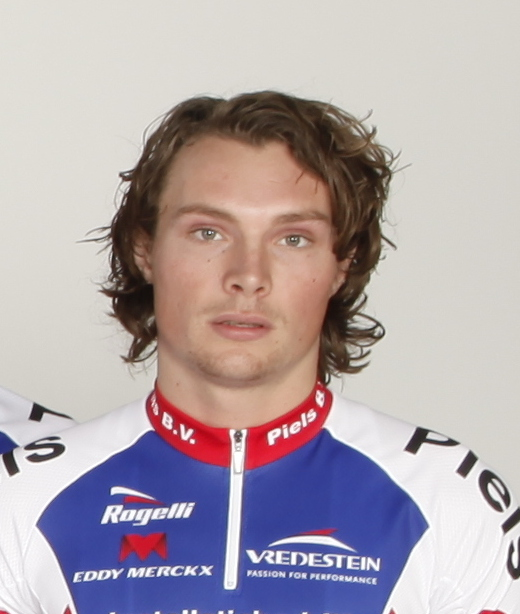
- Ariesen in 2013

Personal information
- Full name: Jacob Willem Ariesen
- Nickname: Johim
- Born: 16 March 1988 (age 38) Rhenen, Netherlands
- Height: 1.80 m (5 ft 11 in)
- Weight: 70 kg (150 lb)

Cycling career
- Sport: Cycling
- Discipline: Road
- Role: Rider
- Rider type: Sprinter

Amateur team
- 2019–2021: HSK Trias–Mooi Jong

Professional teams
- 2009–2011: Cycling Team Jo Piels
- 2012: Koga Cycling Team
- 2013: Cycling Team Jo Piels
- 2014–2018: Metec–TKH

Jacob Willem "Johim" Ariesen (born 16 March 1988 in Rhenen) is a Dutch cyclist, who most recently rode for Dutch amateur team Mooi Jong–HSK Trias.

== Major results ==
2009
6th Scandinavian Open Road Race
10th Ronde van Midden-Nederland
2010
4th Arno Wallaard Memorial
6th Dwars door Drenthe
6th Kernen Omloop Echt-Susteren
8th Münsterland Giro
8th Ronde van Overijssel
2011
4th Arno Wallaard Memorial
6th Ronde van Midden-Nederland
9th Kernen Omloop Echt-Susteren
2012
7th Antwerpse Havenpijl
8th Ronde van Midden-Nederland
2013
1st Mountains classification Olympia's Tour
2nd Zuid Oost Drenthe Classic II
7th Ronde van Midden-Nederland
9th Ster van Zwolle
2014
1st Points classification Course de la Solidarité Olympique
3rd Dorpenomloop Rucphen
4th Destination Thy
4th Skive–Løbet
6th Ster van Zwolle
6th Himmerland Rundt
7th Ronde van Zeeland Seaports
2015
1st Overall Course de la Solidarité Olympique

1st Points classification
1st Stages 1, 2, 4 & 5

1st Ronde van Noord-Holland
Volta ao Alentejo

1st Stages 3 & 5

Tour of China I

1st Points classification
1st Stage 3

2nd Parel van de Veluwe
3rd Himmerland Rundt
3rd Kernen Omloop Echt-Susteren
4th Overall Tour of China II
5th Overall Ronde de l'Oise

1st Points classification
1st Stage 1

10th Overall World Ports Classic
10th Arno Wallaard Memorial
10th Dwars door Drenthe
2016
1st Skive–Løbet
1st GP Viborg
1st Stage 3 Volta ao Alentejo
Bałtyk–Karkonosze Tour

1st Stages 1 & 4

4th Memorial Van Coningsloo
5th Ster van Zwolle
6th De Kustpijl
6th Gooikse Pijl
7th Arnhem–Veenendaal Classic
2017
1st Stage 2 Volta ao Alentejo
1st Stage 5 Tour de Normandie
1st Stage 1 Bałtyk–Karkonosze Tour
3rd Ronde van Overijssel
7th ZODC Zuidenveld Tour
7th Arno Wallaard Memorial
2018
1st Stage 3 Tour de Normandie
4th Skive–Løbet
