= Remco Torenbosch =

Dutch visual artist

Remco Torenbosch (born 1982, in Netherlands) is a visual artist.

== Biography ==
Torenbosch took part in exhibitions at: Kunsthaus Zurich, Stedelijk Museum Amsterdam, Centre d'art contemporain du parc Saint-Léger, Kunsthalle Wien, Victoria and Albert Museum, de Appel Amsterdam, Fondazione Antonio Ratti Como, De Vleeshal Middelburg, GAMeC Bergamo, Art Encounters Biennial Timișoara, among others.

Torenbosch has been a lecturer at several institutions including: Yale School of Art New Haven, ArtCenter Pasadena, IULM University of Milan, among others.

Torenbosch was short-listed for the Prix de Rome 2013
