= Metec–Solarwatt p/b Mantel =

Dutch cycling team

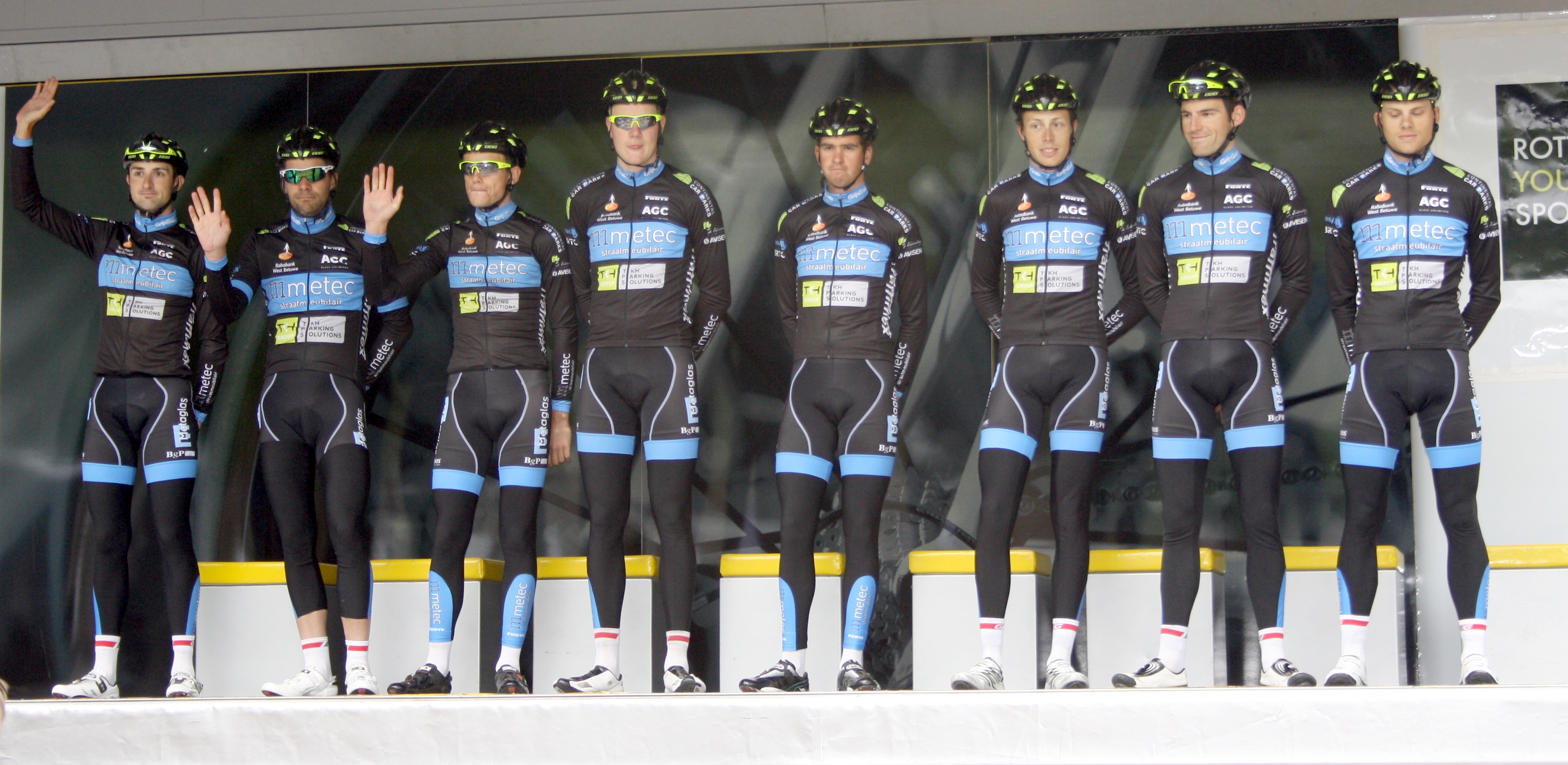

Team information
- UCI code: MET
- Registered: Netherlands
- Founded: 2012
- Discipline: Road
- Status: UCI Continental

Team name history
- 2012 2013–2015 2016–2020 2021–: Metec Continental Cyclingteam; Metec–TKH Continental Cyclingteam; Metec-TKH Continental Cyclingteam p/ Metec–Solarwatt p/b Mantel

Metec–Solarwatt p/b Mantel is a UCI Continental team founded in 2012 and based in the Netherlands. It participates in UCI Continental Circuits races.

== Team roster ==
As of 20 February 2021.

Rider	Date of birth
Huub Artz (NED)	14 May 2002 (age 24)
Sjoerd Bax (NED)	6 January 1996 (age 30)
Dylan Bouwmans (NED)	16 January 1997 (age 29)
Victor Broex (NED)	31 January 2000 (age 26)
Thijs de Lange (NED)	25 November 1994 (age 31)
Hartthijs de Vries (NED)	11 July 1996 (age 30)
Huub Deelstra (NED)	13 April 2000 (age 26)
Lars Hohmann (NED)	5 September 2001 (age 25)

Rider	Date of birth
Adne Koster (NED)	24 August 2000 (age 26)
Tim Marsman (NED)	4 October 2000 (age 25)
Thomas Mijnsbergen (NED)	15 August 2002 (age 24)
Rick Ottema (NED)	25 June 1992 (age 34)
Ramon van Bokhoven (NED)	6 October 1998 (age 27)
Jason van Dalen (NED)	2 July 1994 (age 32)
Jens van den Dool (NED)	10 November 1998 (age 27)
Niels van Ekeren (NED)	9 March 2000 (age 26)

== Major wins ==
2012
Stage 3 Olympia's Tour, Jeff Vermeulen
Netherlands National Time Trial championships, Peter Koning
Stage 1 Course de la Solidarité Olympique, Jeff Vermeulen
2013
Zuid Oost Drenthe Classic I, Jeff Vermeulen
Zuid Oost Drenthe Classic II, Brian van Goethem
Stages 1 & 3 Olympia's Tour, Jeff Vermeulen
2014
Overall Tour de Gironde, Remco te Brake

Stage 3, Remco te Brake

Stage 1 Okolo Slovenska, Team time trial
Stage 1 Czech Cycling Tour, Team time trial
2015
Stages 3 & 5 Volta ao Alentejo, Johim Ariesen
Ronde van Noord-Holland, Johim Ariesen
Stage 1 Ronde de l'Oise, Johim Ariesen
Overall Course de la Solidarité Olympique, Johim Ariesen

Stages 1, 2, 4 & 5, Johim Ariesen

Mountains classification Czech Cycling Tour, Oscar Riesebeek
Stage 3 Tour of China I, Johim Ariesen
2016
Stage 3 Volta ao Alentejo, Johim Ariesen
Stage 4 Volta ao Alentejo, Jarno Gmelich
Arno Wallaard Memorial, Maarten van Trijp
GP Viborg, Johim Ariesen
Skive–Løbet, Johim Ariesen
Stages 1 & 4 Bałtyk–Karkonosze Tour, Johim Ariesen
2017
Stage 2 Volta ao Alentejo, Johim Ariesen
Dorpenomloop Rucphen, Maarten van Trijp
2018
Stage 3 Tour de Normandie, Johim Ariesen
2019
Stage 3 Tour de Normandie, Arvid de Kleijn
Stage 3 Tour du Loir-et-Cher, Arvid de Kleijn
Overall Carpathian Couriers Race, Marijn van den Berg

Stage 1, David Dekker
Stage 2, Marijn van den Berg
Stage 4, Dennis van der Horst

Stage 2 Rhône-Alpes Isère Tour, Sjoerd Bax
Midden–Brabant Poort Omloop, Arvid de Kleijn
Netherlands National U23 Road Race championships, David Dekker
Stage 1 Course de Solidarność et des Champions Olympiques, Arvid de Kleijn
Stage 4 Kreiz Breizh Elites, Arvid de Kleijn
Druivenkoers Overijse, Arvid de Kleijn
2022
Stage 6 Tour de Normandie, Tim Marsman
Stage 5 Tour du Loir-et-Cher, Rick Ottema
