= Remco te Brake =

Dutch cyclist (born 1988)

Personal information
- Full name: Remco te Brake
- Born: 29 November 1988 (age 37) Rhenen, Netherlands

Cycling career
- Sport: Cycling
- Current team: Azerion / Villa Valkenburg
- Discipline: Road
- Role: Rider (retired); Directeur sportif

Professional teams
- 2010–2012: Van Vliet–EBH Elshof
- 2013–2015: Metec–TKH
- 2016–2017: Parkhotel Valkenburg Continental Team

Managerial team
- 2018–: Monkey Town Continental Team

Remco te Brake (born 29 November 1988) is a Dutch former professional cyclist, who competed between 2010 and 2017 for the Cycling Team De Rijke, Metec–TKH and Monkey Town Continental Team squads. Te Brake now works as a directeur sportif for UCI Continental team Azerion / Villa Valkenburg.

== Major results ==
2010
5th Omloop van het Waasland
5th Omloop der Kempen
8th Ster van Zwolle
10th Ronde van Overijssel
10th La Côte Picarde
2011
2nd Antwerpse Havenpijl
3rd Ronde van Noord-Holland
4th Kernen Omloop Echt-Susteren
5th Arno Wallaard Memorial
5th Omloop van het Waasland
7th Schaal Sels
8th Dutch Food Valley Classic
8th Handzame Classic
10th Tour de Rijke
2012
5th Overall Ronde van Overijssel
5th Ster van Zwolle
6th Trofeo Palma de Mallorca
8th Dwars door Drenthe
10th Ronde van Drenthe
2013
2nd Skive–Løbet
3rd Ronde van Noord-Holland
4th Overall Tour du Loir-et-Cher
8th De Kustpijl
9th Beverbeek Classic
2014
1st Overall Tour de Gironde

1st Stage 3

3rd Kernen Omloop Echt-Susteren
4th De Kustpijl
8th Nationale Sluitingsprijs
10th Ronde van Drenthe
2015
4th Ster van Zwolle
5th Nationale Sluitingsprijs
8th Ronde van Overijssel
9th Nokere Koerse
2016
5th Dorpenomloop Rucphen
