= 2014 NetApp–Endura season =

2014 NetApp–Endura season
Manager	Ralph Denk
One-day victories	2
Stage race overall victories	1
Stage race stage victories	1
Previous season • Next season

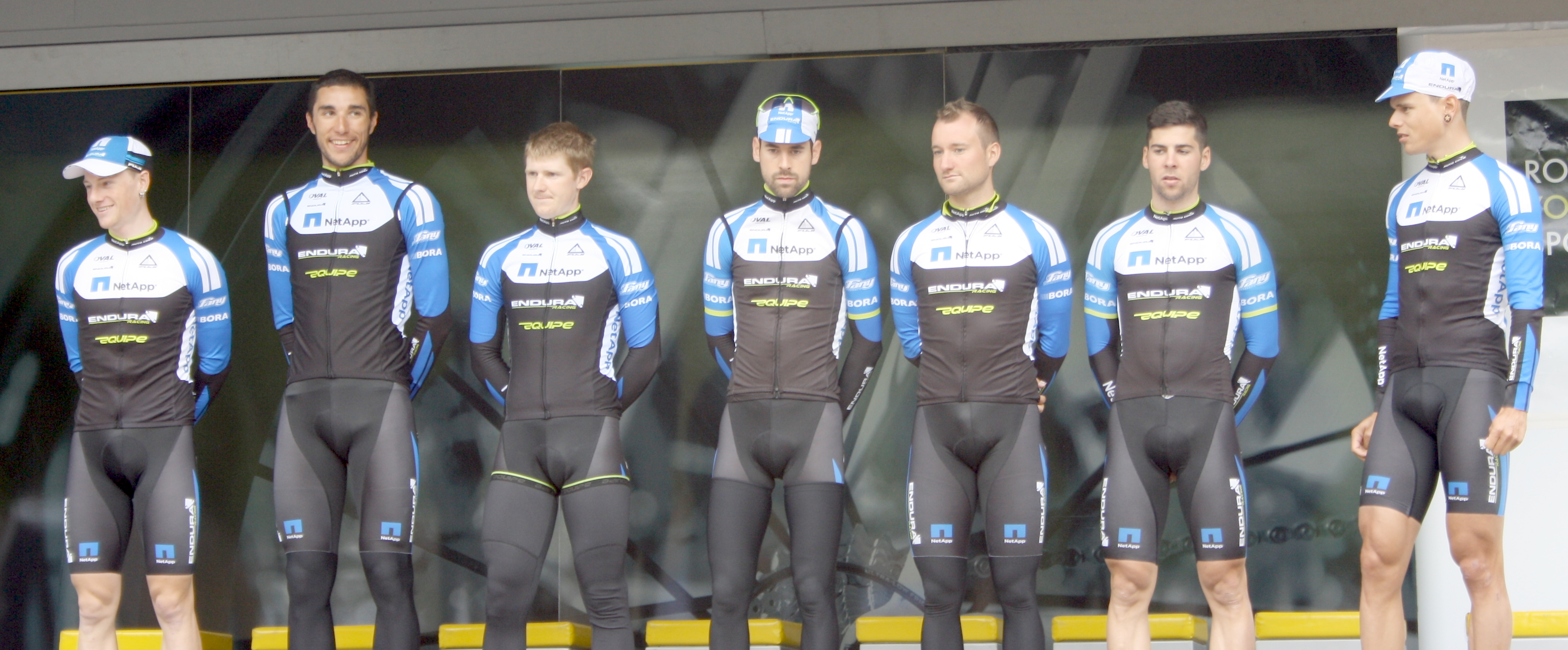
Net App

The 2014 season for the NetApp–Endura cycling team began in February at the Tour of Qatar. The team participated in UCI Continental Circuits and UCI World Tour events when given a wildcard invitation.

== 2014 roster ==
As of 1 February 2014.

Rider	Date of birth
Jan Bárta (CZE)	7 December 1984 (age 40)
Cesare Benedetti (ITA)	3 August 1987 (age 37)
Sam Bennett (IRL)	16 October 1990 (age 34)
Iker Camaño (ESP)	14 March 1979 (age 46)
David de la Cruz (ESP)	6 May 1989 (age 35)
Zak Dempster (AUS)	27 September 1987 (age 37)
Bartosz Huzarski (POL)	27 October 1980 (age 44)
Blaž Jarc (SLO)	17 July 1988 (age 36)
Leopold König (CZE)	15 November 1987 (age 37)
Tiago Machado (POR)	18 October 1985 (age 39)

Rider	Date of birth
Ralf Matzka (GER)	24 August 1989 (age 35)
Jonathan McEvoy (GBR)	2 August 1989 (age 35)
José Mendes (POR)	24 April 1985 (age 39)
František Paďour (CZE)	19 January 1988 (age 37)
Erick Rowsell (GBR)	29 July 1990 (age 34)
Andreas Schillinger (GER)	13 July 1983 (age 41)
Daniel Schorn (AUT)	21 October 1988 (age 36)
Michael Schwarzmann (GER)	7 January 1991 (age 34)
Scott Thwaites (GBR)	12 February 1990 (age 35)
Paul Voss (GER)	26 March 1986 (age 38)

Riders who joined the team for the 2014 season

Rider	2013 team
Sam Bennett	neo-pro (An Post–Chain Reaction)
Tiago Machado	RadioShack–Leopard
František Paďour	ex-pro (Bauknecht–Author)

Riders who left the team during or after the 2013 season

Rider	2014 team
Russell Downing	NFTO Pro Cycling
Markus Eichler	Team Stölting
Roger Kluge	IAM Cycling
Alexander Wetterhall	Firefighters Upsala CK

== Season victories ==
Date	Race	Competition	Rider	Country	Location
2 March	Clásica de Almería	UCI Europe Tour	Sam Bennett (IRL)	Spain	Almería
21 April	Rund um Köln	UCI Europe Tour	Sam Bennett (IRL)	Germany	Cologne
1 June	Bayern-Rundfahrt, Stage 5	UCI Europe Tour	Sam Bennett (IRL)	Germany	Nürnberg
1 June	Bayern-Rundfahrt, Sprints classification	UCI Europe Tour	Sam Bennett (IRL)	Germany	
22 June	Tour of Slovenia, Overall	UCI Europe Tour	Tiago Machado (POR)	Slovenia	
19 July	Tour of Qinghai Lake, Teams classification	UCI Asia Tour	(Note: The riders on the squad were Cesare Benedetti, Blaž Jarc, Ralf Matzka, František Paďour, Daniel Schorn, Michael Schwarzmann and Erick Rowsell)	China	
