= Benedetti =

Benedetti is an Italian surname. Notable people with the surname include:

- Alessio Benedetti (born 1990), Italian footballer
- Alessio Benedetti (footballer, born 1997), Italian professional footballer
- Amedeo Benedetti (writer) (1954–2017), Italian scholar and writer
- Amedeo Benedetti (footballer) (born 1991), Italian footballer
- Ângelo Sampaio Benedetti, or simply Ângelo (born 1981), Brazilian footballer
- Armando Benedetti (born 1967), Colombian politician
- Arturo Benedetti Michelangeli (1920–1995), Italian pianist
- Atilio Benedetti (born 1955), Argentine politician
- Carolina Benedetti, Colombian mathematician and educator
- Cesare Benedetti (1920–2002), Italian footballer and painter
- Cesare Benedetti (cyclist) (born 1987), Italian cyclist
- Enrico Benedetti (1940–1996), Italian ice hockey player
- Fabrizio Benedetti, Italian neuroscientist
- Franco Benedetti (1932–2009), Italian wrestler
- Gastón Benedetti (born 2001), Argentine footballer
- Georges Benedetti (1930–2018), French politician
- Giacomo Benedetti (born 1999), Italian footballer
- Giambattista Benedetti (1530–1590), Venetian mathematician
- Giovanni Benedetti (1917–2017), Italian Roman Catholic bishop
- Jonatan Benedetti (born 1997), Argentine footballer
- Joseph B. Benedetti (1929–2014), American lawyer and politician
- Josefina Benedetti (born 1953), Venezuelan-American composer and choral director
- Julia Benedetti (born 2004), Spanish skateboarder
- Leonardo Benedetti (born 2000), Italian football player
- Lorenzo Benedetti (born 1992), Italian footballer
- Luiz Benedetti (born 2006), Brazilian footballer
- Mario Benedetti (1920–2009), Uruguayan writer
- Myria Benedetti (born 1975), Thai singer, actress and model
- Nehuén Benedetti (born 2005), Argentine footballer
- Nicola Benedetti (born 1987), Scottish violinist
- Sergio Benedetti (1942–2018), Italian art historian
- Silvano Benedetti (born 1965), Italian footballer and youth team coach
- Simone Benedetti (born 1992), Italian footballer, son of Silvano
- Stefania Benedetti (born 1969), former Italian female long-distance runner
- Vincent, Count Benedetti (1817–1900), French diplomat
- Yvan Benedetti (born 1965), French far-right activist

== See also ==
- Benedetti–Wehrli Stadium, a stadium in Illinois
- Benedetta
- Benedetto (disambiguation)
