= Cesare Benedetti (disambiguation) =

Cesare Benedetti (born 1987) is an Italian cyclist.

Cesare Benedetti may also refer to:

- Cesare Benedetti (footballer, born October 1920) (1920–2002), Italian footballer with Roma and Salernitana, and later a painter
- Cesare Benedetti (footballer, born November 1920) (1920–1990), Italian footballer who played in France for Marseille and Toulouse
