= 2015 Bora–Argon 18 season =

Bora–Argon 18
- 2015 season
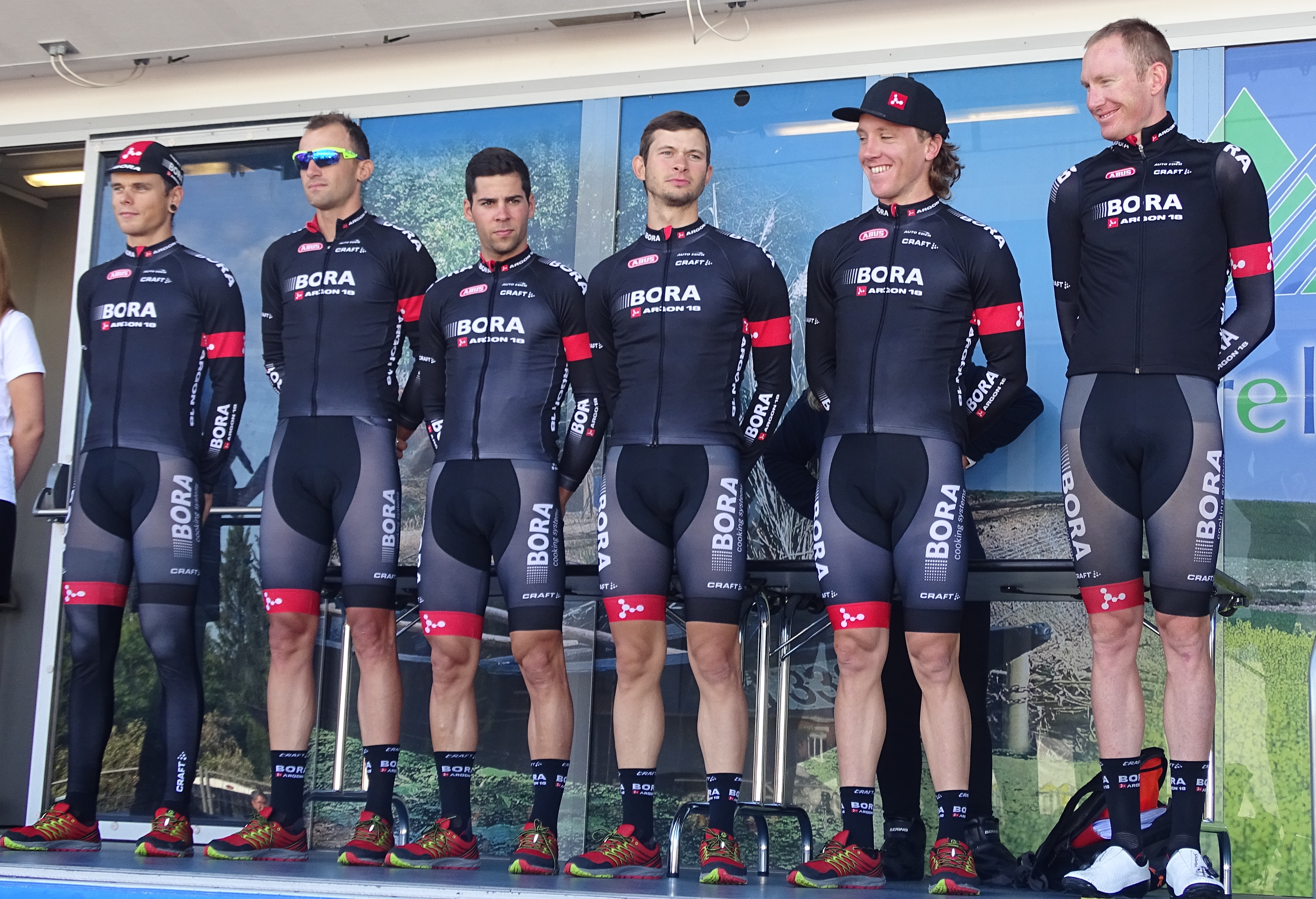
- Grand Prix d'Isbergues
- UCI code: BOA
- Status: UCI Professional Continental
- Manager: Ralph Denk
- Main sponsor(s): BORA & Argon 18
- Based: Germany
- Bicycles: Argon 18

Season victories
- One-day races: 1
- Stage race overall: -
- Stage race stages: 5
- National Championships: 2
- Most wins: Gregor Mühlberger (6)
- Best ranked rider: Sam Bennett

The 2015 season for the Bora–Argon 18 cycling team began in January at the Trofeo Santanyi–Ses Salines-Campos. The team participated in UCI Continental Circuits and UCI World Tour events when given a wildcard invitation.

On the first rest day of the 2014 Tour de France, 15 July 2014, the team announced they had secured sponsorship with German cooking surface and extractor manufacturer BORA. The team for 2015 onwards will thus be known as Team BORA. The team will be the first German team with a German title sponsor in the professional peloton since 2010. Team manager Ralph Denk expressed hope that BORA's backing would help the team achieve their aim of joining the UCI World Tour by 2017. After the end of the 2014 Tour de France, it was announced that starting in 2015 the team would ride bicycles from Canadian company, Argon 18, which would also be the team's second title sponsor.

== 2015 roster ==
Rider	Date of birth
Shane Archbold (NZL)	2 February 1989 (aged 25)
Jan Bárta (CZE)	7 December 1984 (aged 30)
Phil Bauhaus (GER)	8 July 1994 (aged 20)
Cesare Benedetti (ITA)	3 August 1987 (aged 27)
Sam Bennett (IRL)	16 October 1990 (aged 24)
Emanuel Buchmann (GER)	18 November 1992 (aged 22)
Zak Dempster (AUS)	27 September 1987 (aged 27)
Bartosz Huzarski (POL)	27 October 1980 (aged 34)
Patrick Konrad (AUT)	13 October 1991 (aged 23)
Ralf Matzka (GER)	24 August 1989 (aged 25)

Rider	Date of birth
José Mendes (POR)	24 April 1985 (aged 29)
Dominik Nerz (GER)	25 August 1989 (aged 25)
Christoph Pfingsten (GER)	20 November 1987 (aged 27)
Cristiano Salerno (ITA)	18 February 1985 (aged 29)
Andreas Schillinger (GER)	13 July 1983 (aged 31)
Daniel Schorn (AUT)	21 October 1988 (aged 26)
Michael Schwarzmann (GER)	7 January 1991 (aged 23)
Björn Thurau (GER)	23 July 1988 (aged 26)
Scott Thwaites (GBR)	12 February 1990 (aged 24)
Paul Voss (GER)	26 March 1986 (aged 28)

Riders who joined the team for the 2015 season

Rider	2014 team
Shane Archbold	neo-pro (An Post–Chain Reaction)
Phil Bauhaus	neo-pro (Team Stölting)
Emanuel Buchmann	neo-pro (rad-net Rose Team)
Patrick Konrad	neo-pro (Gourmetfein–Simplon Wels)
Dominik Nerz	BMC Racing Team
Christoph Pfingsten	Cyclingteam de Rijke
Cristiano Salerno	Cannondale
Björn Thurau	Team Europcar

Riders who left the team during or after the 2014 season

Rider	2015 team
Iker Camaño	
David de la Cruz	Etixx–Quick-Step
Blaž Jarc	Retired
Leopold König	Team Sky
Tiago Machado	Team Katusha
Jonathan McEvoy	NFTO
František Paďour	Androni Giocattoli
Erick Rowsell	Madison Genesis

== Season victories ==
Date	Race	Competition	Rider	Country	Location
13 February	Tour of Qatar, Stage 6	UCI Asia Tour	Sam Bennett (IRL)	Qatar	Doha
21 April	Giro del Trentino, Stage 1	UCI Europe Tour	Team time trial (Note: The riders on the squad were Cesare Benedetti, Emanuel Buchmann, Bartosz Huzarski, Patrick Konrad, José Mendes, Dominik Nerz, Cristiano Salerno and Paul Voß)	Italy	Arco
24 April	Giro del Trentino, Sprints classification	UCI Europe Tour	Cesare Benedetti (ITA)	Italy	
13 May	Bayern–Rundfahrt, Stage 1	UCI Europe Tour	Sam Bennett (IRL)	Germany	Waldsassen
15 May	Bayern–Rundfahrt, Stage 3	UCI Europe Tour	Sam Bennett (IRL)	Germany	Ebern
14 August	Arctic Race of Norway, Stage 2	UCI Europe Tour	Sam Bennett (IRL)	Norway	Setermoen
8 October	Paris–Bourges	UCI Europe Tour	Sam Bennett (IRL)	France	Bourges

== National, Continental and World champions 2015 ==
Date	Discipline	Jersey	Rider	Country	Location
26 June	Czech Republic National Time Trial Champion		Jan Bárta (CZE)	Slovakia (Note: The national road championships for the Czech Republic and Slovakia are held together, alternating yearly between the two countries.)	Žilina
28 June	German National Road Race Champion		Emanuel Buchmann (GER)	Germany	Bensheim
