= 2014 Tour of Qinghai Lake =

UCI Asia Tour

Race details
- Dates: 6–19 July 2014
- Stages: 13
- Distance: 2,219 km (1,379 mi)
- Winning time: 51h 40' 40"

Results
Jersey awarded to the overall winner	Winner	Mykhaylo Kononenko (UKR)	(Kolss Cycling Team)
	Second	Thomas Vaubourzeix (FRA)	(Team La Pomme Marseille 13)
	Third	Oleksandr Polivoda (UKR)	(Kolss Cycling Team)
Jersey awarded to the points classification winner	Points	Mykhaylo Kononenko (UKR)	(Kolss Cycling Team)
Jersey awarded to the mountains classification winner	Mountains	Ghader Mizbani (IRI)	(Tabriz Petrochemical Team)
Jersey awarded to the team classification winner	Team	NetApp–Endura	

The 2014 Tour of Qinghai Lake is the 13th edition of an annual professional road bicycle racing stage race held in Qinghai Province, China since 2002, named after Qinghai Lake. The race is run at the highest category (apart from those races which make up the UCI World Tour, and is rated by the International Cycling Union (UCI) as a 2.HC (hors category) race as part of the UCI Asia Tour.

== Teams ==
Twenty-two teams competed in the 2014 Tour of Qinghai Lake. These included five UCI Professional Continental and seventeen UCI Continental teams.

The teams that participated in the race were:

- 5-hour Energy
- Amore & Vita–Selle SMP
- Bike Aid–Ride for Help
- Burgos BH
- China Hainan HNB Yindongli
- Continental Team Astana
- Drapac Professional Cycling
- Euskadi
- Gan Su Sports Lottery Cycling Team
- Hengxiang Cycling Team
- Kolss Cycling Team
- Team La Pomme Marseille 13
- Neri Sottoli
- NetApp–Endura
- Ningxia Sports Lottery Cycling Team
- Qinghai Tianyoude Cycling Team
- RTS–Santic Racing Team
- RusVelo
- Tabriz Petrochemical Team
- Torku Şekerspor
- UnitedHealthcare
- Vini Fantini–Nippo

== Route ==
Stage characteristics and winners
Stage	Date	Course	Distance	Type	Winner
1	6 July	Xining to Xining	122 km (76 mi)	Flat stage	Oleksandr Polivoda (UKR)
2	7 July	Duoba to Datong	188 km (117 mi)	Flat stage	Marco Benfatto (ITA)
3	8 July	Huzhu to Xihai	234 km (145 mi)	Hilly stage	Mykhaylo Kononenko (UKR)
4	9 July	Xihai to Heimahe	206 km (128 mi)	Flat stage	Marco Benfatto (ITA)
5	10 July	Qinghai Lake to Guide	203 km (126 mi)	Hilly stage	Thomas Vaubourzeix (FRA)
6	11 July	Guide to Tongren	208 km (129 mi)	Hilly stage	Grega Bole (SLO)
7	12 July	Tongren to Hualong	143 km (89 mi)	Hilly stage	Timofey Kritsky (RUS)
8	13 July	Xunhua to Lintao	225 km (140 mi)	Hilly stage	Sergiy Lagkuti (UKR)
	14 July			Rest day	
9	15 July	Tianshui to Tianshui	118 km (73 mi)	Flat stage	Ahmet Örken (TUR)
10	16 July	Tianshui to Pingliang	227 km (141 mi)	Hilly stage	Grega Bole (SLO) (Note: All results achieved by Ilya Davidenok (KAZ), including his general classification victory and stage 10 win, were voided after he tested positive for anabolic steroids at the Tour de l'Avenir the following month.)
11	17 July	Yinchuan to Yinchuan	133 km (83 mi)	Flat stage	Mattia Gavazzi (ITA)
12	18 July	Zhongwei to Zhongwei	120 km (75 mi)	Flat stage	Eduard-Michael Grosu (ROM)
13	19 July	Lanzhou to Lanzhou	92 km (57 mi)	Flat stage	Mattia Gavazzi (ITA)

== Stages ==
=== Stage 1 ===
6 July 2014 — Xining to Xining, 122 km (76 mi)

Stage 1 result
Rank	Rider	Team	Time
1	Oleksandr Polivoda (UKR)	Kolss Cycling Team	2h 28' 50"
DSQ	~~Ilya Davidenok~~ (KAZ)	~~Continental Team Astana~~	~~+ 0"~~
3	José Gonçalves (POR)	Team La Pomme Marseille 13	+ 40"
4	Samuele Conti (ITA)	Neri Sottoli	+ 40"
5	Takashi Miyazawa (JPN)	Vini Fantini–Nippo	+ 40"
6	Daniel Summerhill (USA)	UnitedHealthcare	+ 40"
7	Michael Schwarzmann (GER)	NetApp–Endura	+ 40"
DSQ	~~Vahid Ghaffari~~ (IRI)	~~Tabriz Petrochemical Team~~	~~+ 40"~~
9	Volodymyr Dyudya (UKR)	Gan Su Sports Lottery Cycling Team	+ 40"
10	Luigi Miletta (ITA)	Neri Sottoli	+ 40"

General classification after stage 1
Rank	Rider	Team	Time
1	Oleksandr Polivoda (UKR)	Kolss Cycling Team	2h 28' 37"
DSQ	~~Ilya Davidenok~~ (KAZ)	~~Continental Team Astana~~	~~+ 5"~~
2	José Gonçalves (POR)	Team La Pomme Marseille 13	+ 49"
3	Mehdi Sohrabi (IRI)	Tabriz Petrochemical Team	+ 52"
5	Samuele Conti (ITA)	Neri Sottoli	+ 53"
6	Takashi Miyazawa (JPN)	Vini Fantini–Nippo	+ 53"
7	Daniel Summerhill (USA)	UnitedHealthcare	+ 53"
8	Michael Schwarzmann (GER)	NetApp–Endura	+ 53"
DSQ	~~Vahid Ghaffari~~ (IRI)	~~Tabriz Petrochemical Team~~	~~+ 53"~~
10	Volodymyr Dyudya (UKR)	Gan Su Sports Lottery Cycling Team	+ 53"

=== Stage 2 ===
7 July 2014 — Duoba to Datong, 188 km (117 mi)

Stage 2 result
Rank	Rider	Team	Time
1	Marco Benfatto (ITA)	Continental Team Astana	4h 17' 35"
2	Robert Förster (GER)	UnitedHealthcare	+ 0"
3	Evaldas Šiškevičius (LTU)	Team La Pomme Marseille 13	+ 0"
4	Jon Aberasturi (ESP)	Euskadi	+ 0"
5	Jonathan Cantwell (AUS)	Drapac Professional Cycling	+ 0"
6	Antonio Di Battista (ITA)	Amore & Vita–Selle SMP	+ 0"
7	Carlos Barbero (ESP)	Euskadi	+ 0"
8	Eduard-Michael Grosu (ROU)	Vini Fantini–Nippo	+ 0"
9	Ralf Matzka (GER)	NetApp–Endura	+ 0"
10	Federico Butto (ITA)	Burgos BH	+ 0"

General classification after stage 2
Rank	Rider	Team	Time
1	Oleksandr Polivoda (UKR)	Kolss Cycling Team	6h 46' 12"
DSQ	~~Ilya Davidenok~~ (KAZ)	~~Continental Team Astana~~	~~+ 5"~~
2	José Gonçalves (POR)	Team La Pomme Marseille 13	+ 49"
3	Mehdi Sohrabi (IRI)	Tabriz Petrochemical Team	+ 52"
5	Daniel Summerhill (USA)	UnitedHealthcare	+ 53"
6	Takashi Miyazawa (JPN)	Vini Fantini–Nippo	+ 53"
7	Volodymyr Dyudya (UKR)	Gan Su Sports Lottery Cycling Team	+ 53"
8	Samuele Conti (ITA)	Neri Sottoli	+ 53"
9	Sergiy Lagkuti (UKR)	Kolss Cycling Team	+ 53"
DSQ	~~Vahid Ghaffari~~ (IRI)	~~Tabriz Petrochemical Team~~	~~+ 53"~~

=== Stage 3 ===
8 July 2014 — Huzhu to Xihai, 234 km (145 mi)

Stage 3 result
Rank	Rider	Team	Time
1	Mykhaylo Kononenko (UKR)	Kolss Cycling Team	5h 27' 26"
2	Thomas Vaubourzeix (FRA)	Team La Pomme Marseille 13	+ 5"
DSQ	~~Ilya Davidenok~~ (KAZ)	~~Continental Team Astana~~	~~+ 5"~~
4	Juan José Oroz (ESP)	Burgos BH	+ 27"
5	Daniel Summerhill (USA)	UnitedHealthcare	+ 27"
6	Oleksandr Polivoda (UKR)	Kolss Cycling Team	+ 27"
7	José Gonçalves (POR)	Team La Pomme Marseille 13	+ 27"
8	František Paďour (CZE)	NetApp–Endura	+ 29"
9	Timofey Kritsky (RUS)	RusVelo	+ 29"
10	Nurbolat Kulimbetov (KAZ)	Continental Team Astana	+ 32"

General classification after stage 3
Rank	Rider	Team	Time
1	Oleksandr Polivoda (UKR)	Kolss Cycling Team	12h 14' 05"
DSQ	~~Ilya Davidenok~~ (KAZ)	~~Continental Team Astana~~	~~+ 1"~~
2	Mykhaylo Kononenko (UKR)	Kolss Cycling Team	+ 30"
3	Thomas Vaubourzeix (FRA)	Team La Pomme Marseille 13	+ 38"
5	José Gonçalves (POR)	Team La Pomme Marseille 13	+ 49"
6	Daniel Summerhill (USA)	UnitedHealthcare	+ 53"
7	Juan José Oroz (ESP)	Burgos BH	+ 1' 09"
8	František Paďour (CZE)	NetApp–Endura	+ 1' 11"
9	Timofey Kritsky (RUS)	RusVelo	+ 1' 11"
DSQ	~~Vahid Ghaffari~~ (IRI)	~~Tabriz Petrochemical Team~~	~~+ 1' 12"~~

=== Stage 4 ===
9 July 2014 — Xihai to Heimahe, 206 km (128 mi)

Stage 4 result
Rank	Rider	Team	Time
1	Marco Benfatto (ITA)	Continental Team Astana	4h 48' 49"
2	Mehdi Sohrabi (IRI)	Tabriz Petrochemical Team	+ 0"
3	Robert Förster (GER)	UnitedHealthcare	+ 0"
4	Ahmet Örken (TUR)	Torku Şekerspor	+ 0"
5	Jonathan Cantwell (AUS)	Drapac Professional Cycling	+ 0"
6	Daniel Schorn (AUT)	NetApp–Endura	+ 0"
7	Boris Shpilevsky (RUS)	RTS–Santic Racing Team	+ 0"
8	Eduard-Michael Grosu (ROU)	Vini Fantini–Nippo	+ 0"
9	Takashi Miyazawa (JPN)	Vini Fantini–Nippo	+ 0"
10	Igor Boev (RUS)	RusVelo	+ 0"

General classification after stage 4
Rank	Rider	Team	Time
1	Oleksandr Polivoda (UKR)	Kolss Cycling Team	17h 02' 54"
DSQ	~~Ilya Davidenok~~ (KAZ)	~~Continental Team Astana~~	~~+ 1"~~
2	Mykhaylo Kononenko (UKR)	Kolss Cycling Team	+ 30"
3	Thomas Vaubourzeix (FRA)	Team La Pomme Marseille 13	+ 38"
5	Daniel Summerhill (USA)	UnitedHealthcare	+ 53"
6	Juan José Oroz (ESP)	Burgos BH	+ 1' 09"
7	František Paďour (CZE)	NetApp–Endura	+ 1' 11"
8	Timofey Kritsky (RUS)	RusVelo	+ 1' 11"
DSQ	~~Vahid Ghaffari~~ (IRI)	~~Tabriz Petrochemical Team~~	~~+ 1' 12"~~
10	Nurbolat Kulimbetov (KAZ)	Continental Team Astana	+ 1' 14"

=== Stage 5 ===
10 July 2014 — Qinghai Lake to Guide, 203 km (126 mi)

Stage 5 result
Rank	Rider	Team	Time
1	Thomas Vaubourzeix (FRA)	Team La Pomme Marseille 13	4h 51' 23"
2	Juan José Oroz (ESP)	Burgos BH	+ 0"
DSQ	~~Ilya Davidenok~~ (KAZ)	~~Continental Team Astana~~	~~+ 3"~~
4	Mykhaylo Kononenko (UKR)	Kolss Cycling Team	+ 18"
DSQ	~~Luca Benedetti~~ (ITA)	~~Amore & Vita–Selle SMP~~	~~+ 22"~~
6	Daniel Schorn (AUT)	NetApp–Endura	+ 22"
7	Samuele Conti (ITA)	Neri Sottoli	+ 22"
8	Miguel Mínguez (ESP)	Euskadi	+ 22"
9	Rémy Di Gregorio (FRA)	Team La Pomme Marseille 13	+ 22"
10	Juan Pablo Wilches (COL)	Qinghai Tianyoude Cycling Team	+ 22"

General classification after stage 5
Rank	Rider	Team	Time
DSQ	~~Ilya Davidenok~~ (KAZ)	~~Continental Team Astana~~	~~21h 54' 15"~~
1	Thomas Vaubourzeix (FRA)	Team La Pomme Marseille 13	21h 54' 45"
2	Mykhaylo Kononenko (UKR)	Kolss Cycling Team	+ 19"
3	Oleksandr Polivoda (UKR)	Kolss Cycling Team	+ 27"
5	Juan José Oroz (ESP)	Burgos BH	+ 35"
6	František Paďour (CZE)	NetApp–Endura	+ 1' 05"
7	Daniel Summerhill (USA)	UnitedHealthcare	+ 1' 06"
8	José Gonçalves (POR)	Team La Pomme Marseille 13	+ 1' 12"
DSQ	~~Vahid Ghaffari~~ (IRI)	~~Tabriz Petrochemical Team~~	~~+ 1' 25"~~
10	Ahmet Örken (TUR)	Torku Şekerspor	+ 1' 41"

=== Stage 6 ===
11 July 2014 — Guide to Tongren, 208 km (129 mi)

Stage 6 result
Rank	Rider	Team	Time
1	Grega Bole (SLO)	Vini Fantini–Nippo	5h 52' 29"
2	Pierpaolo De Negri (ITA)	Vini Fantini–Nippo	+ 0"
3	Blaž Jarc (SLO)	NetApp–Endura	+ 0"
4	Igor Boev (RUS)	RusVelo	+ 0"
5	Daniel Summerhill (USA)	UnitedHealthcare	+ 0"
6	Mekseb Debesay (ERI)	Bike Aid–Ride for Help	+ 0"
6	Mykhaylo Kononenko (UKR)	Kolss Cycling Team	+ 0"
DSQ	~~Ilya Davidenok~~ (KAZ)	~~Continental Team Astana~~	~~+ 0"~~
9	Daniel Schorn (AUT)	NetApp–Endura	+ 0"
10	Mirko Tedeschi (ITA)	Neri Sottoli	+ 0"

General classification after stage 6
Rank	Rider	Team	Time
DSQ	~~Ilya Davidenok~~ (KAZ)	~~Continental Team Astana~~	~~27h 46' 44"~~
1	Thomas Vaubourzeix (FRA)	Team La Pomme Marseille 13	27h 47' 14"
2	Mykhaylo Kononenko (UKR)	Kolss Cycling Team	+ 19"
3	Oleksandr Polivoda (UKR)	Kolss Cycling Team	+ 27"
5	František Paďour (CZE)	NetApp–Endura	+ 1' 05"
6	Daniel Summerhill (USA)	UnitedHealthcare	+ 1' 06"
7	José Gonçalves (POR)	Team La Pomme Marseille 13	+ 1' 12"
DSQ	~~Vahid Ghaffari~~ (IRI)	~~Tabriz Petrochemical Team~~	~~+ 1' 25"~~
9	Ahmet Örken (TUR)	Torku Şekerspor	+ 1' 41"
10	Víctor Martín (ESP)	Burgos BH	+ 1' 55"

=== Stage 7 ===
12 July 2014 — Tongren to Hualong, 143 km (89 mi)

Stage 7 result
Rank	Rider	Team	Time
1	Timofey Kritsky (RUS)	RusVelo	3h 24' 58"
2	Andrey Mizurov (KAZ)	RTS–Santic Racing Team	+ 55"
3	Ghader Mizbani (IRI)	Tabriz Petrochemical Team	+ 55"
4	Oleksandr Kvachuk (UKR)	Kolss Cycling Team	+ 1' 03"
5	James Stemper (USA)	5-hour Energy	+ 1' 11"
6	Antoine Lavieu (FRA)	Team La Pomme Marseille 13	+ 1' 15"
7	Taylor Sheldon (USA)	5-hour Energy	+ 2' 33"
8	Juan Pablo Wilches (COL)	Qinghai Tianyoude Cycling Team	+ 2' 33"
9	Mykhaylo Kononenko (UKR)	Kolss Cycling Team	+ 2' 33"
DSQ	~~Luca Benedetti~~ (ITA)	~~Amore & Vita–Selle SMP~~	~~+ 2' 33"~~

General classification after stage 7
Rank	Rider	Team	Time
DSQ	~~Ilya Davidenok~~ (KAZ)	~~Continental Team Astana~~	~~31h 14' 15"~~
1	Thomas Vaubourzeix (FRA)	Team La Pomme Marseille 13	31h 14' 45"
2	Mykhaylo Kononenko (UKR)	Kolss Cycling Team	+ 19"
3	Oleksandr Polivoda (UKR)	Kolss Cycling Team	+ 27"
5	František Paďour (CZE)	NetApp–Endura	+ 1' 05"
6	José Gonçalves (POR)	Team La Pomme Marseille 13	+ 1' 12"
7	Víctor Martín (ESP)	Burgos BH	+ 1' 55"
8	Chad Beyer (USA)	5-hour Energy	+ 2' 00"
9	Cesare Benedetti (ITA)	NetApp–Endura	+ 3' 03"
10	Samad Pourseyedi (IRI)	Tabriz Petrochemical Team	+ 4' 01"

=== Stage 8 ===
13 July 2014 — Xunhua to Lintao, 225 km (140 mi)

Stage 8 result
Rank	Rider	Team	Time
1	Sergiy Lagkuti (UKR)	Kolss Cycling Team	5h 41' 28"
2	Volodymyr Kogut (UKR)	Amore & Vita–Selle SMP	+ 0"
3	Samuele Conti (ITA)	Neri Sottoli	+ 0"
4	Illart Zuazubiskar (ESP)	Euskadi	+ 8"
5	Gavin Mannion (USA)	5-hour Energy	+ 9"
6	Mikel Iturria (ESP)	Euskadi	+ 23"
7	Ahmet Örken (TUR)	Torku Şekerspor	+ 25"
8	Grega Bole (SLO)	Vini Fantini–Nippo	+ 25"
9	Mykhaylo Kononenko (UKR)	Kolss Cycling Team	+ 25"
10	Daniel Schorn (AUT)	NetApp–Endura	+ 25"

General classification after stage 8
Rank	Rider	Team	Time
DSQ	~~Ilya Davidenok~~ (KAZ)	~~Continental Team Astana~~	~~36h 56' 08"~~
1	Thomas Vaubourzeix (FRA)	Team La Pomme Marseille 13	36h 56' 38"
2	Mykhaylo Kononenko (UKR)	Kolss Cycling Team	+ 19"
3	Oleksandr Polivoda (UKR)	Kolss Cycling Team	+ 27"
5	František Paďour (CZE)	NetApp–Endura	+ 1' 05"
6	José Gonçalves (POR)	Team La Pomme Marseille 13	+ 1' 12"
7	Víctor Martín (ESP)	Burgos BH	+ 1' 55"
8	Chad Beyer (USA)	5-hour Energy	+ 2' 00"
9	Cesare Benedetti (ITA)	NetApp–Endura	+ 3' 03"
10	Samad Pourseyedi (IRI)	Tabriz Petrochemical Team	+ 4' 01"

=== Stage 9 ===
15 July 2014 — Tianshui to Tianshui, 118 km (73 mi)

Stage 9 result
Rank	Rider	Team	Time
1	Ahmet Örken (TUR)	Torku Şekerspor	2h 12' 54"
2	Robert Förster (GER)	UnitedHealthcare	+ 0"
3	Mykhaylo Kononenko (UKR)	Kolss Cycling Team	+ 0"
4	Jon Aberasturi (ESP)	Euskadi	+ 0"
5	Daniel Schorn (AUT)	NetApp–Endura	+ 0"
6	Eduard-Michael Grosu (ROU)	Vini Fantini–Nippo	+ 0"
7	Shiki Kuroeda (JPN)	Vini Fantini–Nippo	+ 0"
8	Jonathan Cantwell (AUS)	Drapac Professional Cycling	+ 0"
9	Leonid Krasnov (RUS)	RusVelo	+ 0"
10	Mattia Gavazzi (ITA)	Amore & Vita–Selle SMP	+ 0"

General classification after stage 9
Rank	Rider	Team	Time
DSQ	~~Ilya Davidenok~~ (KAZ)	~~Continental Team Astana~~	~~39h 09' 02"~~
1	Thomas Vaubourzeix (FRA)	Team La Pomme Marseille 13	39h 09' 31"
2	Mykhaylo Kononenko (UKR)	Kolss Cycling Team	+ 16"
3	Oleksandr Polivoda (UKR)	Kolss Cycling Team	+ 25"
5	František Paďour (CZE)	NetApp–Endura	+ 1' 06"
6	José Gonçalves (POR)	Team La Pomme Marseille 13	+ 1' 13"
7	Víctor Martín (ESP)	Burgos BH	+ 1' 56"
8	Chad Beyer (USA)	5-hour Energy	+ 2' 01"
9	Cesare Benedetti (ITA)	NetApp–Endura	+ 3' 04"
10	Samad Pourseyedi (IRI)	Tabriz Petrochemical Team	+ 4' 02"

=== Stage 10 ===
16 July 2014 — Tianshui to Pingliang, 227 km (141 mi)

Stage 10 result
Rank	Rider	Team	Time
DSQ	~~Ilya Davidenok~~ (KAZ)	~~Continental Team Astana~~	~~5h 15' 34"~~
1	Grega Bole (SLO)	Vini Fantini–Nippo	5h 15' 34"
3	Mykhaylo Kononenko (UKR)	Kolss Cycling Team	+ 0"
DSQ	~~Luca Benedetti~~ (ITA)	~~Amore & Vita–Selle SMP~~	~~+ 0"~~
5	Carlos Barbero (ESP)	Euskadi	+ 0"
6	Daniel Schorn (AUT)	NetApp–Endura	+ 0"
7	Mirko Tedeschi (ITA)	Neri Sottoli	+ 0"
8	Ahmet Örken (TUR)	Torku Şekerspor	+ 0"
9	Giuseppe Fonzi (ITA)	Neri Sottoli	+ 0"
10	Zhandos Bizhigitov (KAZ)	Continental Team Astana	+ 0"

General classification after stage 10
Rank	Rider	Team	Time
DSQ	~~Ilya Davidenok~~ (KAZ)	~~Continental Team Astana~~	~~44h 24' 26"~~
1	Thomas Vaubourzeix (FRA)	Team La Pomme Marseille 13	44h 25' 05"
2	Mykhaylo Kononenko (UKR)	Kolss Cycling Team	+ 12"
3	Oleksandr Polivoda (UKR)	Kolss Cycling Team	+ 25"
5	František Paďour (CZE)	NetApp–Endura	+ 1' 06"
6	José Gonçalves (POR)	Team La Pomme Marseille 13	+ 1' 13"
7	Víctor Martín (ESP)	Burgos BH	+ 1' 56"
8	Chad Beyer (USA)	5-hour Energy	+ 2' 01"
9	Cesare Benedetti (ITA)	NetApp–Endura	+ 3' 04"
10	Samad Pourseyedi (IRI)	Tabriz Petrochemical Team	+ 4' 02"

=== Stage 11 ===
17 July 2014 — Yinchuan to Yinchuan, 133 km (83 mi)

Stage 11 result
Rank	Rider	Team	Time
1	Mattia Gavazzi (ITA)	Amore & Vita–Selle SMP	2h 48' 59"
2	Jon Aberasturi (ESP)	Euskadi	+ 0"
3	Jonathan Cantwell (AUS)	Drapac Professional Cycling	+ 0"
4	Mykhaylo Kononenko (UKR)	Kolss Cycling Team	+ 0"
5	Boris Shpilevsky (RUS)	RTS–Santic Racing Team	+ 0"
6	Robert Förster (GER)	UnitedHealthcare	+ 0"
7	Igor Boev (RUS)	RusVelo	+ 0"
8	Leonid Krasnov (RUS)	RusVelo	+ 0"
9	Grega Bole (SLO)	Vini Fantini–Nippo	+ 0"
10	Carlos Alzate (COL)	UnitedHealthcare	+ 0"

General classification after stage 11
Rank	Rider	Team	Time
DSQ	~~Ilya Davidenok~~ (KAZ)	~~Continental Team Astana~~	~~47h 13' 22"~~
1	Thomas Vaubourzeix (FRA)	Team La Pomme Marseille 13	47h 14' 04"
2	Mykhaylo Kononenko (UKR)	Kolss Cycling Team	+ 7"
3	Oleksandr Polivoda (UKR)	Kolss Cycling Team	+ 25"
5	František Paďour (CZE)	NetApp–Endura	+ 1' 06"
6	José Gonçalves (POR)	Team La Pomme Marseille 13	+ 1' 13"
7	Víctor Martín (ESP)	Burgos BH	+ 1' 56"
8	Chad Beyer (USA)	5-hour Energy	+ 2' 01"
9	Cesare Benedetti (ITA)	NetApp–Endura	+ 3' 04"
10	Samad Pourseyedi (IRI)	Tabriz Petrochemical Team	+ 4' 12"

=== Stage 12 ===
18 July 2014 — Zhongwei to Zhongwei, 120 km (75 mi)

Stage 12 result
Rank	Rider	Team	Time
1	Eduard-Michael Grosu (ROU)	Vini Fantini–Nippo	2h 35' 09"
2	Boris Shpilevsky (RUS)	RTS–Santic Racing Team	+ 0"
3	Carlos Alzate (COL)	UnitedHealthcare	+ 0"
4	Mattia Gavazzi (ITA)	Amore & Vita–Selle SMP	+ 0"
5	Marco Benfatto (ITA)	Continental Team Astana	+ 0"
6	Jon Aberasturi (ESP)	Euskadi	+ 0"
7	Leonid Krasnov (RUS)	RusVelo	+ 0"
8	Grega Bole (SLO)	Vini Fantini–Nippo	+ 0"
9	Takashi Miyazawa (JPN)	Vini Fantini–Nippo	+ 0"
10	Robert Förster (GER)	UnitedHealthcare	+ 0"

General classification after stage 12
Rank	Rider	Team	Time
DSQ	~~Ilya Davidenok~~ (KAZ)	~~Continental Team Astana~~	~~49h 48' 31"~~
1	Thomas Vaubourzeix (FRA)	Team La Pomme Marseille 13	49h 49' 13"
2	Mykhaylo Kononenko (UKR)	Kolss Cycling Team	+ 1"
3	Oleksandr Polivoda (UKR)	Kolss Cycling Team	+ 24"
5	František Paďour (CZE)	NetApp–Endura	+ 1' 06"
6	José Gonçalves (POR)	Team La Pomme Marseille 13	+ 1' 13"
7	Víctor Martín (ESP)	Burgos BH	+ 1' 56"
8	Chad Beyer (USA)	5-hour Energy	+ 2' 01"
9	Cesare Benedetti (ITA)	NetApp–Endura	+ 3' 04"
10	Samad Pourseyedi (IRI)	Tabriz Petrochemical Team	+ 4' 12"

=== Stage 13 ===
19 July 2014 — Lanzhou to Lanzhou, 92 km (57 mi)

Stage 13 result
Rank	Rider	Team	Time
1	Mattia Gavazzi (ITA)	Amore & Vita–Selle SMP	1h 51' 28"
2	Grega Bole (SLO)	Vini Fantini–Nippo	+ 0"
3	Daniel Schorn (AUT)	NetApp–Endura	+ 0"
4	Eduard-Michael Grosu (ROU)	Vini Fantini–Nippo	+ 0"
5	Jon Aberasturi (ESP)	Euskadi	+ 0"
6	Shiki Kuroeda (JPN)	Vini Fantini–Nippo	+ 0"
7	Jonathan Cantwell (AUS)	Drapac Professional Cycling	+ 0"
8	Meron Amanuel (ERI)	Bike Aid–Ride for Help	+ 0"
9	Riccardo Stacchiotti (ITA)	Vini Fantini–Nippo	+ 0"
10	Evaldas Šiškevičius (LTU)	Team La Pomme Marseille 13	+ 0"

Final general classification
Rank	Rider	Team	Time
DSQ	~~Ilya Davidenok~~ (KAZ)	~~Continental Team Astana~~	~~51h 39' 58"~~
1	Mykhaylo Kononenko (UKR)	Kolss Cycling Team	51h 40' 40"
2	Thomas Vaubourzeix (FRA)	Team La Pomme Marseille 13	+ 1"
3	Oleksandr Polivoda (UKR)	Kolss Cycling Team	+ 25"
5	František Paďour (CZE)	NetApp–Endura	+ 1' 07"
6	José Gonçalves (POR)	Team La Pomme Marseille 13	+ 1' 14"
7	Víctor Martín (ESP)	Burgos BH	+ 1' 57"
8	Chad Beyer (USA)	5-hour Energy	+ 2' 02"
9	Cesare Benedetti (ITA)	NetApp–Endura	+ 3' 05"
10	Samad Pourseyedi (IRI)	Tabriz Petrochemical Team	+ 4' 13"

== Classification leadership table ==
Stage	Winner	General classification	Points classification	Mountains classification	Teams classification
1	Oleksandr Polivoda	Oleksandr Polivoda	Oleksandr Polivoda	not awarded	Kolss Cycling Team
2	Marco Benfatto	Oleksandr Polivoda	Oleksandr Polivoda	not awarded	Kolss Cycling Team
3	Mykhaylo Kononenko	Oleksandr Polivoda	Oleksandr Polivoda	Ghader Mizbani	Continental Team Astana
4	Marco Benfatto	Oleksandr Polivoda	Marco Benfatto	Ghader Mizbani	Continental Team Astana
5	Thomas Vaubourzeix	Thomas Vaubourzeix	Thomas Vaubourzeix	Ghader Mizbani	NetApp–Endura
6	Grega Bole	Thomas Vaubourzeix	Mykhaylo Kononenko	Ghader Mizbani	NetApp–Endura
7	Timofey Kritsky	Thomas Vaubourzeix	Mykhaylo Kononenko	Ghader Mizbani	NetApp–Endura
8	Sergiy Lagkuti	Thomas Vaubourzeix	Mykhaylo Kononenko	Ghader Mizbani	NetApp–Endura
9	Ahmet Örken	Thomas Vaubourzeix	Mykhaylo Kononenko	Ghader Mizbani	NetApp–Endura
10	Grega Bole	Thomas Vaubourzeix	Mykhaylo Kononenko	Ghader Mizbani	NetApp–Endura
11	Mattia Gavazzi	Thomas Vaubourzeix	Mykhaylo Kononenko	Ghader Mizbani	NetApp–Endura
12	Eduard-Michael Grosu	Thomas Vaubourzeix	Mykhaylo Kononenko	Ghader Mizbani	NetApp–Endura
13	Mattia Gavazzi	Mykhaylo Kononenko	Mykhaylo Kononenko	Ghader Mizbani	NetApp–Endura
Final		Mykhaylo Kononenko	Mykhaylo Kononenko	Ghader Mizbani	NetApp–Endura
