= Mykhaylo Kononenko =

Ukrainian racing cyclist

Personal information
- Full name: Mykhaylo Mykhaylovich Kononenko
- Born: 30 October 1987 (age 38): Chernihiv, Ukrainian SSR, Soviet Union; (now Ukraine)

Cycling career
- Sport: Cycling
- Current team: Retired
- Discipline: Road
- Role: Rider

Amateur team
- 2007–2008: Ukraine Neri Sottoli

Professional teams
- 2010–2017: Kolss Cycling Team
- 2018: Team Novak
- 2018–2020: Beijing XDS–Innova Cycling Team
- 2021–2023: Salcano–Sakarya BB Team

Major wins
- One-day races and Classics National Road Race Championships (2015, 2020) National Time Trial Championships (2020, 2021)

Mykhaylo Mykhaylovich Kononenko (Ukrainian: Михайло Михайлович Кононенко; born 30 October 1987) is a Ukrainian former professional road cyclist, who competed as a professional from 2010 to April 2023.

Kononenko turned professional in 2010, and is a two-time national champion in both the road race and time trial. Between 2011 and 2022, he took at least one victory each year in a UCI race. His most notable win was the overall title of the 2014 Tour of Qinghai Lake, which he was awarded later on after initial winner Ilya Davidenok's results were stripped for a doping violation. In August 2017, he won the Odessa Grand Prix, while four other members of his team rounded ut the rest of the top five.

He competed in the time trial at the 2022 UCI Road World Championships, where he placed 34th. However, he was later disqualified after testing positive for tramadol, which is a substance banned in competeitions by the UCI. However, he did not receive any suspension, as it was a first offense and the drug does not fall under the anti-doping guidelines as it is only banned under the UCI's medical rules.

== Major results ==
2008
1st Overall Mainfranken-Tour
2010
1st Stage 5 Grand Prix of Adygeya
8th Grand Prix of Donetsk
2011
1st Stage 5 Okolo Slovenska
2nd Grand Prix of Donetsk
6th Grand Prix of Moscow
2012
1st Stage 4 Grand Prix of Sochi
National Road Championships

2nd Time trial
6th Road race

5th Overall Baltic Chain Tour
5th Mayor Cup
7th Grand Prix of Donetsk
8th Overall Grand Prix of Sochi
2013
1st Race Horizon Park 2
2nd Overall Tour of Romania

1st Prologue (TTT)

2nd Grand Prix of Donetsk
National Road Championships

3rd Time trial
5th Road race

3rd Overall Tour of Bulgaria
3rd Race Horizon Park 1
5th Coupe des Carpathes
5th Grand Prix of Moscow
5th Memorial Oleg Dyachenko
6th Overall Tour of Hainan
6th Tour of Almaty
7th Mayor Cup
2014
1st Overall Tour of Qinghai Lake (Note: Kononenko was promoted one position retroactively, after Ilya Davidenok's results were disqualified following his backdated two-year ban.)

1st Points classification
1st Stage 3

1st Race Horizon Park 2
National Road Championships

2nd Time trial
5th Road race

3rd Overall Baltic Chain Tour

1st Stages 1 & 3

3rd Memoriał Henryka Łasaka
10th Overall Grand Prix of Sochi
2015
1st Road race, National Road Championships
1st Memorial Oleg Dyachenko
1st Race Horizon Park Classic
1st Stage 2 Five Rings of Moscow
3rd Overall Tour of Mersin

1st Stage 3

3rd Race Horizon Park Maidan
4th Race Horizon Park Race for Peace
7th Moscow Cup
8th Overall Tour of Kuban
2016
1st Memoriał Romana Siemińskiego
1st Race Horizon Park Classic
2nd Tour de Ribas
4th Odessa Grand Prix
4th Tour of Almaty
5th Overall Tour of Ukraine

1st Stage 2a (TTT)

6th Overall Tour of Qinghai Lake
6th Visegrad 4 Bicycle Race – Kerékpárverseny
6th Horizon Park Race for Peace
9th Memoriał Andrzeja Trochanowskiego
2017
1st Race Horizon Park for Peace
1st Odessa Grand Prix
1st Stage 7 Tour of Qinghai Lake
3rd Overall Tour d'Azerbaïdjan
5th Overall Tour of Hainan
5th Tour de Ribas
6th Overall Tour of Fuzhou

1st Stage 1

7th Time trial, National Road Championships
8th Overall Tour of Ukraine

1st Stage 2 (TTT)

2018
National Road Championships

2nd Time trial
4th Road race

3rd Overall Tour of Xingtai
7th Overall Tour of Quanzhou Bay
7th Overall Tour of Fuzhou

1st Stage 4

10th Overall Tour of China I
2019
2nd Overall Tour of Quanzhou Bay

1st Stage 1

National Road Championships

3rd Road race
4th Time trial

3rd Overall Tour of Xingtai
3rd Grand Prix Justiniano Hotels
6th Overall Tour of Taiyuan
8th Grand Prix Minsk
10th Overall Tour of China I

1st Stage 6

2020
National Road Championships

1st Road race
1st Time trial

1st Grand Prix Cappadocia
1st Grand Prix Central Anatolia
3rd Grand Prix Mount Erciyes
4th Grand Prix Velo Erciyes
5th Grand Prix World's Best High Altitude
2021
National Road Championships

1st Time trial
5th Road race

1st Grand Prix Develi
3rd Kahramanmaraş Grand Prix
4th Germenica Grand Prix
2022
1st Overall Tour of Sakarya

1st Stage 4

1st Grand Prix Kapuzbaşı
2nd Grand Prix Manavgat Side
2nd Grand Prix Tomarza
2nd Grand Prix Yahyalı
2nd Grand Prix Erciyes
4th Grand Prix Develi
5th Grand Prix Kayseri
