= Shenzhen Xidesheng Cycling Team =

Chinese cycling team

Team information
- UCI code: XDS
- Registered: China
- Founded: 2012
- Discipline: Road
- Status: UCI Continental
- Bicycles: XDS

Key personnel
- General manager: Tingde Fu
- Team managers: Yin Chao; An Qi; Zhang Ning

Team name history
- 2012–2014 2015–2016 2016–2018 2019–: China 361° Cycling Team; Beijing Innova Cycling Team; Beijing XDS–Innova Cycling Team; Shenzhen Xidesheng Cycling Team

Shenzhen Xidesheng Cycling Team is a Chinese UCI Continental cycling team established in 2012.

== Team roster ==
As of 7 September 2023.

Rider	Date of birth
An Hao (CHN)	12 October 2002 (age 23)
Erik Bergström Frisk (SWE)	28 September 1999 (age 26)
Hannes Bergström Frisk (SWE)	7 June 1995 (age 31)
Hu Haijie (CHN)	24 August 2004 (age 22)
Kong Lingzhuang (CHN)	25 July 2000 (age 26)
Li Jungang (CHN)	24 May 2002 (age 24)
Li Xi (CHN)	25 September 2004 (age 21)
Li Yuheng (CHN)	6 January 2002 (age 24)

Rider	Date of birth
Li Zhen (CHN)	17 July 2002 (age 24)
Liu Jinchun (CHN)	11 February 1997 (age 29)
Liu Jundong (CHN)	25 December 2004 (age 21)
Lü Zheng (CHN)	14 February 2002 (age 24)
Niu Minghui (CHN)	12 June 2002 (age 24)
Zhang Ruibiao (CHN)	16 June 2002 (age 24)
Zhang Zhiyuan (CHN)	1 September 2003 (age 23)
Zhao Chenli (CHN)	16 August 2004 (age 22)

== Major results ==
2018
Overall Tour of Fuzhou, Ilya Davidenok

Stage 4, Mykhaylo Kononenko

2019
Stage 6 Tour of China I, Mykhaylo Kononenko
Stage 1 Tour of Quanzhou Bay, Mykhaylo Kononenko
Overall Tour of Fuzhou, Artur Fedosseyev

Stage 1, Ilya Davidenok

== National champions ==
2012
Uzbekistan Time Trial, Muradjan Halmuratov
2014
Uzbekistan U23 Time Trial, Denis Shaymanov
2015
Uzbekistan U23 Road Race, Akramjon Sunnatov
Uzbekistan U23 Time Trial, Akramjon Sunnatov
2016
Uzbekistan Time Trial, Muradjan Halmuratov
2019
Ukraine Road Race, Andriy Kulyk
