= Project Nice Côte d'Azur =

Mongolian cycling team

Project Nice Cote D'Azur
Team information
- UCI code: NCA
- Registered: Mongolia
- Founded: January 2018
- Discipline: Road
- Status: UCI Continental

Project Nice Cote d'Azur is a Mongolian UCI Continental cycling team founded in 2018.

== Team roster 2018 ==
Rider	Date of birth
Erdenebat Altan-Ochir (MNG)	28 September 1995 (age 30)
Julien Amadori (FRA)	20 February 1993 (age 33)
Buyandelger Bolortuya (MNG)	9 November 1997 (age 28)
Hugo Bouguet (FRA)	16 July 1995 (age 31)
Stephane Cognet (FRA)	5 November 1981 (age 44)
Brendan Cole (AUS)	24 June 1996 (age 30)

Rider	Date of birth
Erhes Davaasambuu (MNG)	11 June 1999 (age 27)
Bold Iderbold (MNG)	27 June 1998 (age 28)
Buyantogtokh Navaansamdan (MNG)	1 December 1999 (age 26)
Jerome Pulidori (FRA)	19 July 1986 (age 40)
Ayush-ochir Sugarmaa (MNG)	2 March 1999 (age 27)
Thomas Vaubourzeix (FRA)	16 June 1989 (age 37)
