= Thomas Vaubourzeix =

French cyclist

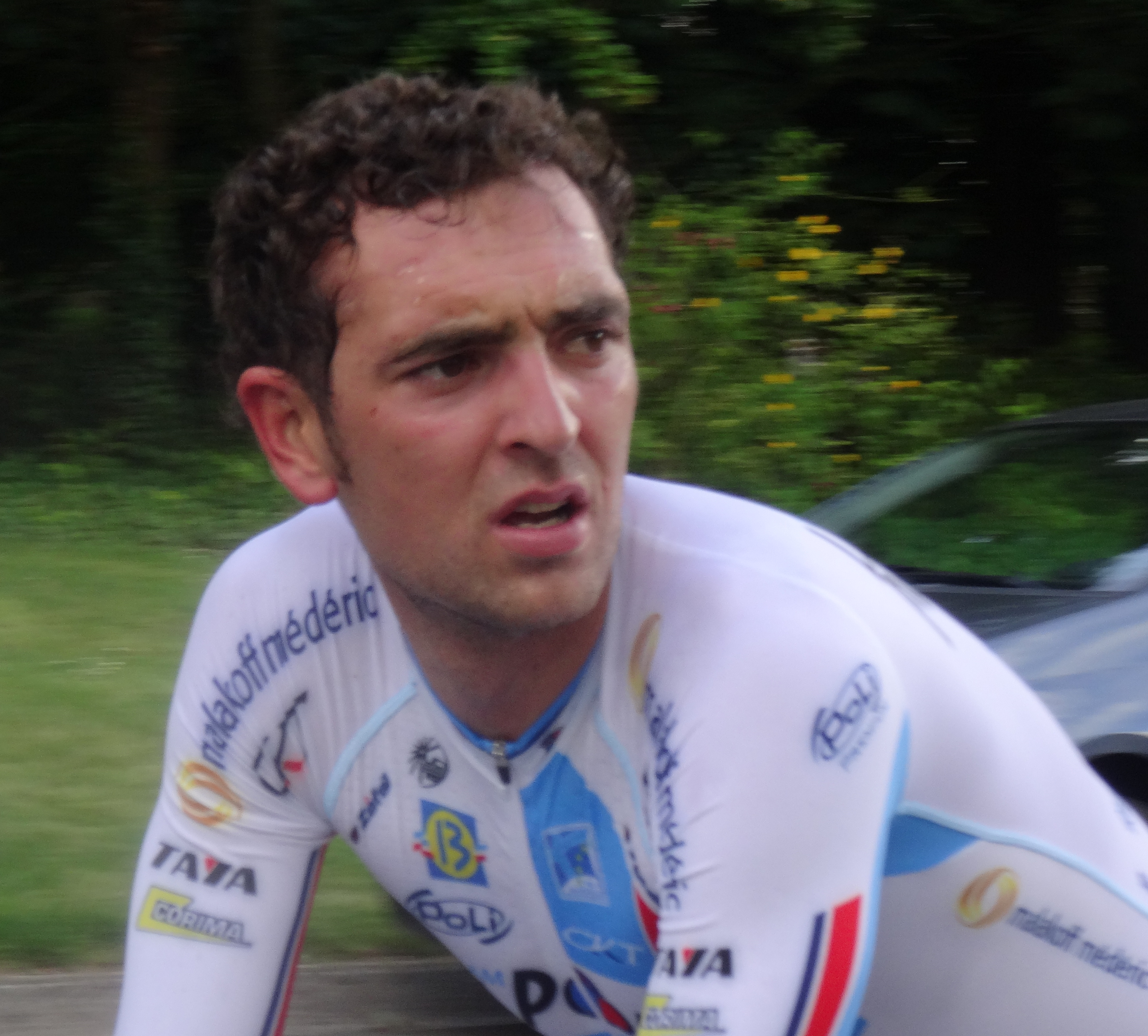
- Thomas Vaubourzeix in 2014

Personal information
- Born: 16 June 1989 (age 37) Gassin, France
- Height: 1.78 m (5 ft 10 in)
- Weight: 70 kg (154 lb)

Cycling career
- Sport: Cycling
- Current team: BAI–Sicasal–Petro de Luanda
- Discipline: Road
- Role: Rider

Amateur teams
- 2009: VS Hyérois
- 2010: Vélo-Club La Pomme Marseille
- 2017: Sprinters Tropéziens
- 2017: AVC Aix-en-Provence
- 2020: CSCA Propreté 2000
- 2021–2022: CSCA Propreté 2000

Professional teams
- 2011–2014: La Pomme Marseille
- 2015: Veranclassic–Ekoi
- 2015–2016: Lupus Racing Team
- 2016: Delko–Marseille Provence KTM (stagiaire)
- 2017: Nice Cycling Team
- 2018: Project Nice Côte d'Azur
- 2019: Natura4Ever–Roubaix–Lille Métropole
- 2021: Cambodia Cycling Academy
- 2022–: BAI–Sicasal–Petro de Luanda

Thomas Vaubourzeix (born 16 June 1989) is a French racing cyclist, who currently rides for UCI Continental team BAI–Sicasal–Petro de Luanda. He rode in the men's team time trial at the 2015 UCI Road World Championships.

== Major results ==
2010
1st Stage 1 Kreiz Breizh Elites
2011
7th Duo Normand (with Julien Antomarchi)
2012
1st Mountains classification Tour Méditerranéen
1st Stage 3 Tour de Bretagne
6th Overall Tour of Taihu Lake
2013
2nd Paris–Troyes
2014
1st Mountains classification Boucles de la Mayenne
2nd Overall Tour of Qinghai Lake

1st Stage 5

2015
1st Sprints classification Boucles de la Mayenne
3rd Grand Prix Criquielion
6th Flèche Ardennaise
8th Overall Tour of Qinghai Lake
2016
Challenge du Prince

1st Trophée Princier
2nd Trophée de la Maison Royale

3rd Overall Tour de Tunisie

1st Stage 3

4th Overall Grand Prix Cycliste de Saguenay
2017
1st Trophée Princier, Challenge du Prince
Les Challenges de la Marche Verte

4th GP Al Massira
6th GP Sakia El Hamra
9th GP Oued Eddahab
