= Nice Cycling Team =

Team information
- UCI code: NCT
- Registered: Kuwait
- Founded: 2017
- Disbanded: 2017
- Discipline: Road
- Status: UCI Continental

Team name history
- 2017: Nice Cycling Team

Nice Cycling Team is a Kuwaiti UCI Continental cycling team founded in 2017 and ended later the same year.

== Team roster ==
As of 31 December 2017.

Rider	Date of birth
Ibrahim Al Jeraiwi (KUW)	22 May 1997 (age 29)
Hussain Alsaffar (KUW)	21 January 1991 (age 35)
Ali Dashti (KUW)	1 May 1988 (age 38)
Cedric Jolidon (SWI)	10 April 1998 (age 28)
Ryan Macanally (AUS)	14 September 1992 (age 33)

Rider	Date of birth
Ariya Phounsavath (LAO)	1 March 1991 (age 35)
Jérôme Pulidori (FRA)	19 July 1986 (age 40)
Bernard Van Aert (INA)	8 September 1997 (age 28)
Thomas Vaubourzeix (FRA)	16 June 1989 (age 37)
Jaime Vergara (COL)	12 June 1987 (age 39)
