= Chad Beyer =

American racing cyclist

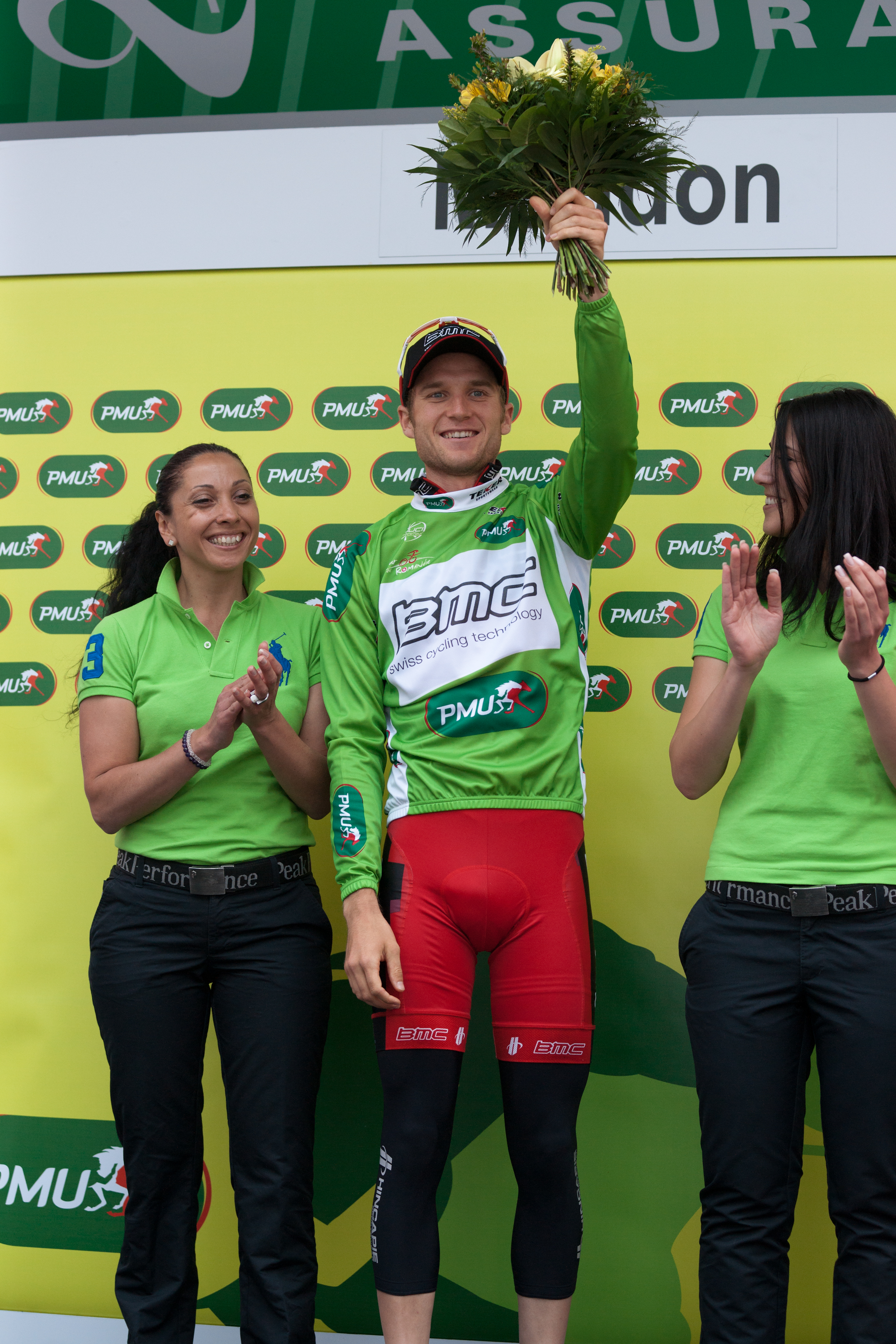
- Beyer at the 2010 Tour de Romandie

Personal information
- Nickname: Chad "Rolex Wearin" Beyer
- Born: August 15, 1986 (age 40) Kansas City, Missouri, U.S.
- Height: 1.78 m (5 ft 10 in)
- Weight: 61 kg (134 lb)

Cycling career
- Sport: Cycling
- Discipline: Road
- Role: Rider
- Rider type: All-rounder

Amateur team
- 2015: Superissimo

Professional teams
- 2009–2011: BMC Racing Team
- 2012: Competitive Cyclist Racing Team
- 2013: Champion System
- 2014: 5-hour Energy
- 2015–2016: Lupus Racing Team
- 2017: Canyon Bicycles

Chad Beyer (born August 15, 1986) is an American former professional road racing cyclist, who rode professionally between 2009 and 2017 for the BMC Racing Team, Competitive Cyclist Racing Team, Champion System, 5-hour Energy, Lupus Racing Team and Hangar 15 Bicycles teams. Beyer's most notable achievement was during the 2010 Tour de Romandie, when he won the Points Classification.

Born in Kansas City, Missouri, Beyer currently resides in Tucson, Arizona.

== Major results ==
2003
3rd Road race, National Junior Road Championships
2004
2nd Road race, National Junior Road Championships
2008
1st Stage 3 (TTT) Tour of Belize
2009
10th U.S. Air Force Cycling Classic
2010
1st Points classification Tour de Romandie
2012
2nd Overall Tour of the Gila

1st Mountains classification

7th Road race, National Road Championships
2013
10th Overall Tour de Beauce
2014
6th Winston-Salem Cycling Classic
8th Overall Tour of Qinghai Lake
2016
4th Road race, National Road Championships
6th Philadelphia International Cycling Classic
8th Winston-Salem Cycling Classic
2017
8th Overall Grand Prix Cycliste de Saguenay

1st Stage 3
