= Ângelo (footballer, born April 1981) =

Brazilian footballer

Personal information
- Full name: Ângelo Sampaio Benedetti
- Date of birth: April 7, 1981 (age 45)
- Place of birth: Campinas, Brazil
- Height: 1.79 m (5 ft 10 1/2 in)
- Position: Defensive midfielder

Team information
- Current team: São Bento

Youth career
- 2001–2002: Ponte Preta

Senior career*
Years	Team	Apps	(Gls)
2003–2005	Ponte Preta	70	(0)
2006	Fluminense	5	(0)
2007	América-RN	3	(0)
2008	Americana		
2009	São Bento		
2009	Ituano		
2010	Sport Barueri		
2010–2011	Joinville		
2012–	São Bento		
- * Club domestic league appearances and goals

Ângelo Sampaio Benedetti, or simply Ângelo (born April 7, 1981 in Campinas), is a Brazilian football defensive midfielder. He currently plays for Esporte Clube São Bento.

Ângelo has played for Ponte Preta and Fluminense in the Campeonato Brasileiro.
