= Xihai Commandery =

Xihai Jun (西海郡) is a prefecture of ancient China located in Qingzang Plateau. Xi means west, Hai means sea, and Jun is a kind of administrative unit above county in ancient China and may be translated as prefecture or province.

Xihai Jun or Xihai Prefecture was first established in the 4th year of Yuanshi (元始四年, AD 4) in the Han dynasty.

The site of the Longqi (龍耆), the capital city of Xihai Jun in the Han dynasty, is located on the south bank of Huangshui River (湟水), near Qinghai Lake at 36.9074°N 100.9809°E. Today, it is called Sanjiao Cheng (三角城, Delta City). It is near the county town of Haiyan County (海晏縣) and 90 kilometers west to Xining City, the capital city Qinghai province.

In the 23rd year of Zhenguan (貞觀二十三年, AD 649), King of Xihai Jun (西海郡王) was conferred upon Songtsen Gampo (松贊幹布), the King of Tubo (吐蕃, or Tibet), by Tang Gaozong (唐高宗), the emperor of the Tang dynasty.
