= Ilya Davidenok =

Kazakhstani cyclist (born 1992)

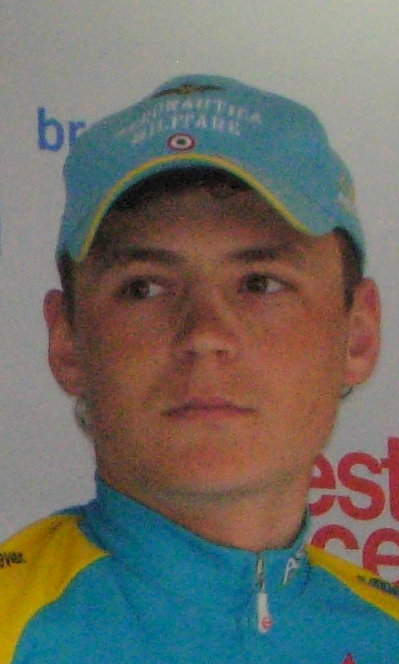
- Davidenok at the 2013 Tour de Bretagne

Personal information
- Full name: Ilya Davidenok
- Born: 19 April 1992 (age 34) Almaty, Kazakhstan

Cycling career
- Sport: Cycling
- Current team: Suspended
- Discipline: Road
- Role: Rider

Amateur team
- 2011: Odo–Astana

Professional teams
- 2012–2014: Continental Team Astana
- 2014: Astana (stagiaire)
- 2016: RTS–Santic Racing Team
- 2017: Tabriz Shahrdary Team
- 2018: Apple Team
- 2018–2019: Beijing XDS–Innova Cycling Team
- 2020: Ningxia Sports Lottery Continental Team
- 2021: Almaty Cycling Team

Ilya Davidenok (born 19 April 1992 in Almaty) is a Kazakhstani cyclist, who is currently suspended from the sport until April 2028.

== Doping ==
In 2014, Davidenok tested positive for Anabolic Steroids at the Tour of Qinghai Lake and the Tour de l'Avenir, a fourth such positive test for Continental Team Astana within seven weeks. He was suspended for two years by the UCI, losing his overall win at the Tour of Qinghai Lake in the process.

In November 2019, Davidenok returned a positive doping test for EPO and the 2019 Tour of Fuzhou. In December 2021, he was banned for eight years, eligible to return to competition in April 2028.

== Major results ==
2011
1st Stage 2a Vuelta a la Independencia Nacional
2013
7th Overall Tour of Estonia
2014
1st Road race, National Road Championships
1st Stage 4 Tour de l'Avenir
8th Road race, UCI Under-23 Road World Championships

Voided results

~~1st Overall Tour of Qinghai Lake~~

~~1st Stage 10~~

2016
6th Overall Tour of Hainan
7th Overall Tour of Taihu Lake
2017
2nd Overall Tour of Iran (Azerbaijan)

1st Mountains classification
1st Young rider classification

6th Overall Tour de Kumano
2018
1st Overall Tour of Fuzhou

1st Points classification

7th Overall Tour of Qinghai Lake
2019

Voided results

~~2nd Overall Tour of Fuzhou~~

~~1st Stage 1~~

9th Overall Tour of Xingtai
