= Cesare Benedetti (footballer, born October 1920) =

Italian footballer and painter (1920–2002

Personal information
- Date of birth: 24 October 1920
- Place of birth: Treviso, Italy
- Date of death: 9 July 2002 (aged 81)
- Height: 1.85 m (6 ft 1 in)
- Position: Defender

Senior career*
Years	Team	Apps	(Gls)
1937–1941	Treviso	75	(2)
1941–1943	Roma	12	(1)
1943–1945	Treviso		
1945–1946	Roma	6	(0)
1946–1948	Salernitana	56	
1948–1949	Treviso	12	(1)
- * Club domestic league appearances and goals

Cesare Benedetti (24 October 1920 – 9 July 2002) was an Italian footballer and a painter.

== Football ==
Benedetti played for three seasons (37 games, 1 goal) in the Serie A for Roma and Salernitana, winning the Serie A in the 1940–41 season with Roma.

== Painting ==
After retirement as a footballer, he became a noted painter. He was accepted at the House of Grimaldi, painting portraits of Grace Kelly, Rainier III, Prince of Monaco, Caroline, Princess of Hanover and other dignitaries. He painted in the United States as well (including the portrait of Caroline Kennedy at 4 years of age). He also painted portraits of several Popes, including Pope John XXIII, Pope Pius XII, Pope Paul VI and a two-meters-high portrait of Pope John Paul II that hangs in the hall of the Treviso Cathedral, earning himself the nickname "Painter of Popes" ("pittore dei Papi").

== See also ==
- Cesare Benedetti (footballer, born November 1920), Italian footballer who played in France for Marseille and Toulouse
