= Josefina Benedetti =

Venezuelan musician

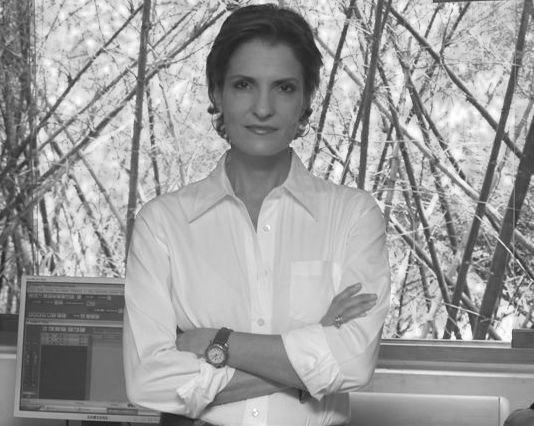
Josefina Punceles de Benedetti.

Josefina Benedetti Punceles (born September 17, 1953) is a Venezuelan-American composer, musicologist and choral director.

== Biography ==
Josefina Benedetti was born in New Haven, Connecticut to Venezuelan-born father. She studied piano in Caracas and London, finished her studies at the National Conservatory of Music, Juan José Landaeta, and studied choral conducting at the University Institute of Musical Studies, Magister Scientiarum, in Latin American. She received a musicology degree from the Universidad Central de Venezuela.

She received the National Prize for Composition in 1989, 1993 and 1998, the Municipal Music Prize of the City of Caracas in 1990 and the José Antonio and Carmen Calcaño Foundation Composition Prize in 1993.

She served as president of Jeunesses Musicales de Venezuela, (1991–96), the National Philharmonic Orchestra Foundation (1995–2000) and the music label Música y Tiempo (Music and Time). She has been Secretary General of the Venezuelan Music Council (UNESCO) and a member of the boards of the Venezuelan Society of Contemporary Music, the Teatro Teresa Carreño Foundation and Director of Culture of the Central University of Venezuela (2000–05).

== Works ==
Benedetti is considered a classical composer, but she also experiments with a fusion of classical, electronic and pop music. Her works have been performed by orchestras, chamber groups, choirs and soloists in Venezuela, the United States, Cuba, Ecuador, Uruguay, Argentina and France, where some of them have become part of the National Library file. Her compositions have been recorded on compact discs under the Música y Tiempo label, which she helped found in 1996, and also by independent producers.

Selected works include:

- 2013: Mbombela
- 2006: Sintharte, Etnorap.
- 2003: Transistoria.
- 2002: Caracas 11 A.
- 1992: La muerte del delfín.

Vocal works:

- 2005: Oda a las mujeres.
- 1993: Guatopo, Réquiem para un siglo.
- 1992: La canción del pirata.
- 1989: Palabreo.
- 1988: Canción de cuna, Cantar.

Chamber music:

- 2007: Lilith.
- 2001: Montuno.
- 1999: Danzas lunares.
- 1998: Impromtu Carnavalesco, Pantanal.
- 1994: Hojas al viento.
- 1993: Ut Pictura Poesis?.
- 1992: Con Corda.
- 1991: Intermezzo nº 1.
- 1990: Suite del intrépido.

Orchestral works:

- 2019: Humboldt
- 2007: Rugeles´82.
- 2001: Cantos del camino.
- 1998: Macuro.
- 1996: Miserere mei, Citas inocentes.
