= Cesare Benedetti (footballer, born November 1920) =

Italian footballer (1920–1990)

Personal information
- Date of birth: 28 November 1920
- Place of birth: Alessandria, Piedmont, Kingdom of Italy
- Date of death: 14 October 1990 (aged 69)
- Place of death: Alessandria, Piedmont, Italy
- Height: 1.63 m (5 ft 4 in)
- Position: Forward

Senior career*
Years	Team	Apps	(Gls)
1939–1940	USD Novese		
1940–1941	Ilva Savona		
1941–1943	Roma	12	(1)
1943–1944	Biellese	14	(5)
1944–1945	Vigevano		
1945–1948	Como	87	(28)
1948–1949	Marseille	19	(9)
1949–1951	Toulouse FC	31	(11)
1951–1952	Biellese	15	(1)
1952–1953	Rapallo Ruentes	29	(11)
1953–1954	Pro Vercelli	19	(10)
1954–1955	Lanciano		
- * Club domestic league appearances and goals

Cesare Benedetti (28 November 1920 – 14 October 1990) was an Italian footballer who played as a forward.
