= Cesare Benedetti =

Road racing cyclist

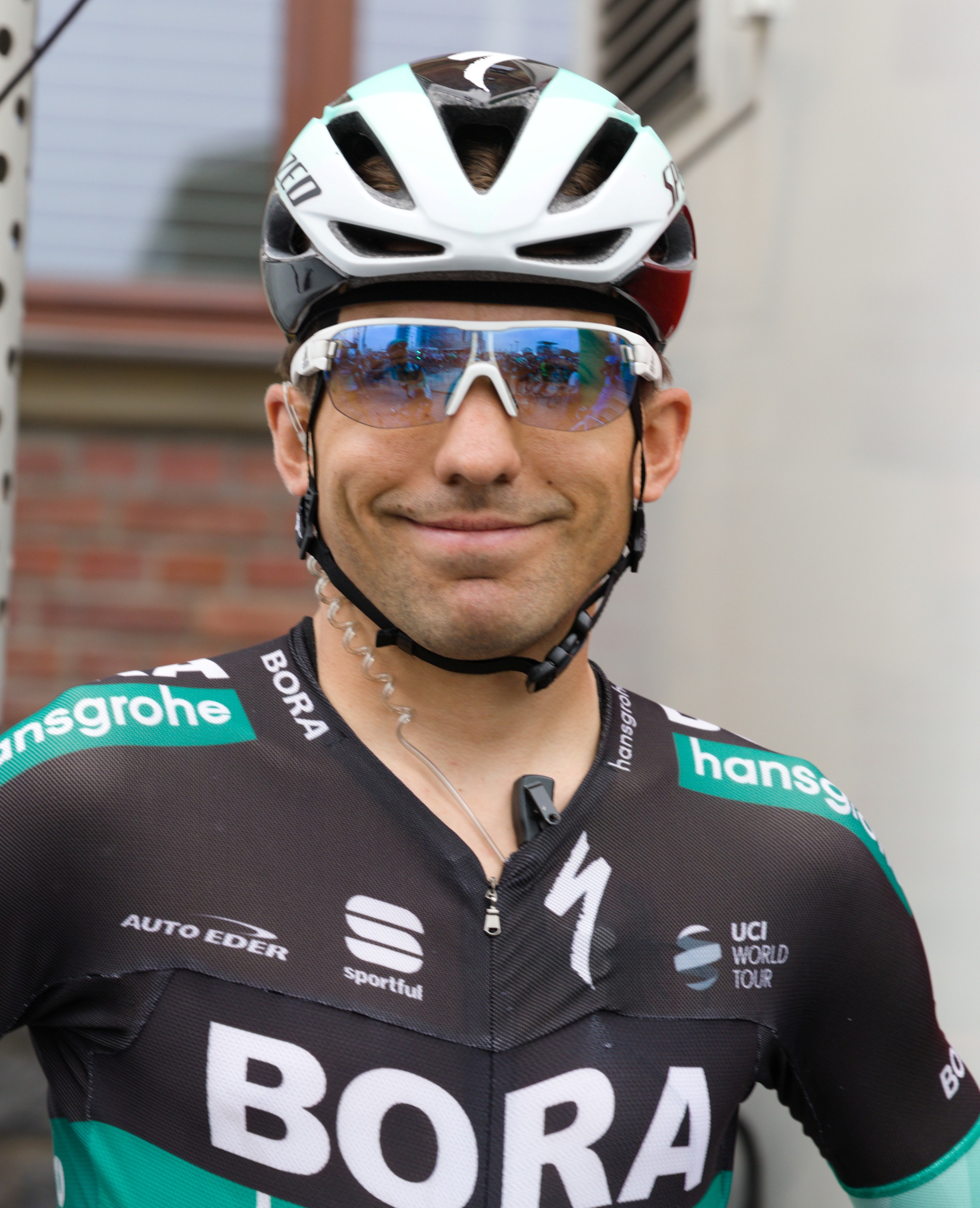
- Benedetti in 2018.

Personal information
- Full name: Cesare Benedetti
- Born: 3 August 1987 (age 39) Rovereto, Italy
- Height: 1.70 m (5 ft 7 in)
- Weight: 63 kg (139 lb)

Cycling career
- Sport: Cycling
- Discipline: Road
- Role: Rider
- Rider type: Breakaway specialist

Professional teams
- 2009: De Nardi
- 2009: → Liquigas (stagiaire)
- 2010–2024: Team NetApp

Major wins
- Grand Tours Giro d'Italia 1 individual stage (2019)

Cesare Benedetti (born 3 August 1987) is an Italian-born Polish former road bicycle racer, who competed as a professional from 2010 to 2024, spending his entire career with Bora–Hansgrohe.

== Career ==
Born in Rovereto, Benedetti has competed as a professional since 2010, competing for the Team NetApp team since turning professional. He was also a member of the GS Gavardo Tecmor and De Nardi teams as an amateur, and also spent the second half of the 2009 season as a stagiaire with the Liquigas team.

Benedetti, and Team NetApp, made their Grand Tour début at the 2012 Giro d'Italia, where Benedetti exceeded the team's expectations of a top ten stage placing, by taking fifth place during the sixth stage of the race. Benedetti had been part of an eleven-rider breakaway at the start of the stage, but after Androni Giocattoli–Venezuela's Miguel Ángel Rubiano went clear, Benedetti remained with another three riders to the end of the stage.

He was named in the start list for the 2016 Tour de France and the 2016 Vuelta a España.

Benedetti took his first individual professional victory at stage 12 of the 2019 Giro d'Italia. Having been part of a 25-rider breakaway at the start of the stage, he took the stage win leading a small group sprint in a late comeback after having been dropped in the last hill climb.

== Personal life ==
Benedetti's wife is Polish. He is fluent in Polish and was granted Polish citizenship in April 2021.

During the 2021 season, Benedetti started competing under a Polish licence.

== Major results ==
2005
6th Overall Giro della Lunigiana
2007
2nd Gran Premio Sportivi Podenzano
3rd Trofeo Città di Brescia
3rd Trofeo FTP Tapparo
4th Gran Premio Industria Commercio Artigianato – Botticino
4th Targa d'Oro Città di Legnano
9th Gran Premio Palio del Recioto
2008
1st Trofeo Edil C
2nd Coppa Stignani
2nd Trofeo Filtri
3rd Milano–Busseto
4th Coppa Caduti di Reda
5th Trofeo G.S. Gavardo Tecmor
5th Medaglia Oro Angelo Fumagalli
9th GP Città di Felino
2009
2nd Trofeo Banca Popolare di Vicenza
3rd Gran Premio San Luigi
6th Overall Girobio
8th Città di Conegliano
9th GP Inda
10th Trofeo Eco del Chisone
2010
1st Plombières
8th Memorial Van Coningsloo
2011
8th Overall Szlakiem Grodów Piastowskich
2012
1st Stage 2b (TTT) Settimana Internazionale di Coppi e Bartali
2014
9th Overall Tour of Qinghai Lake
2015
Giro del Trentino

1st Sprints classification
1st Stage 1 (TTT)

2016
1st Mountains classification, Tirreno–Adriatico
7th GP Industria & Artigianato di Larciano
10th Rudi Altig Race
2017
Giro d'Italia

Held after Stage 1

2018
3rd Overall Okolo Slovenska
2019
1st Stage 12 Giro d'Italia

=== Grand Tour general classification results timeline ===
Grand Tour	2012	2013	2014	2015	2016	2017	2018	2019	2020	2021	2022	2023
Giro d'Italia	107	—	—	—	—	115	108	74	94	103	120	102
Tour de France	—	—	—	—	128	—	—	—	—	—	—	—
Vuelta a España	—	—	—	—	93	DNF	—	—	—	107	—	—

Legend
—	Did not compete
DNF	Did not finish
