= František Paďour =

Road bicycle racer

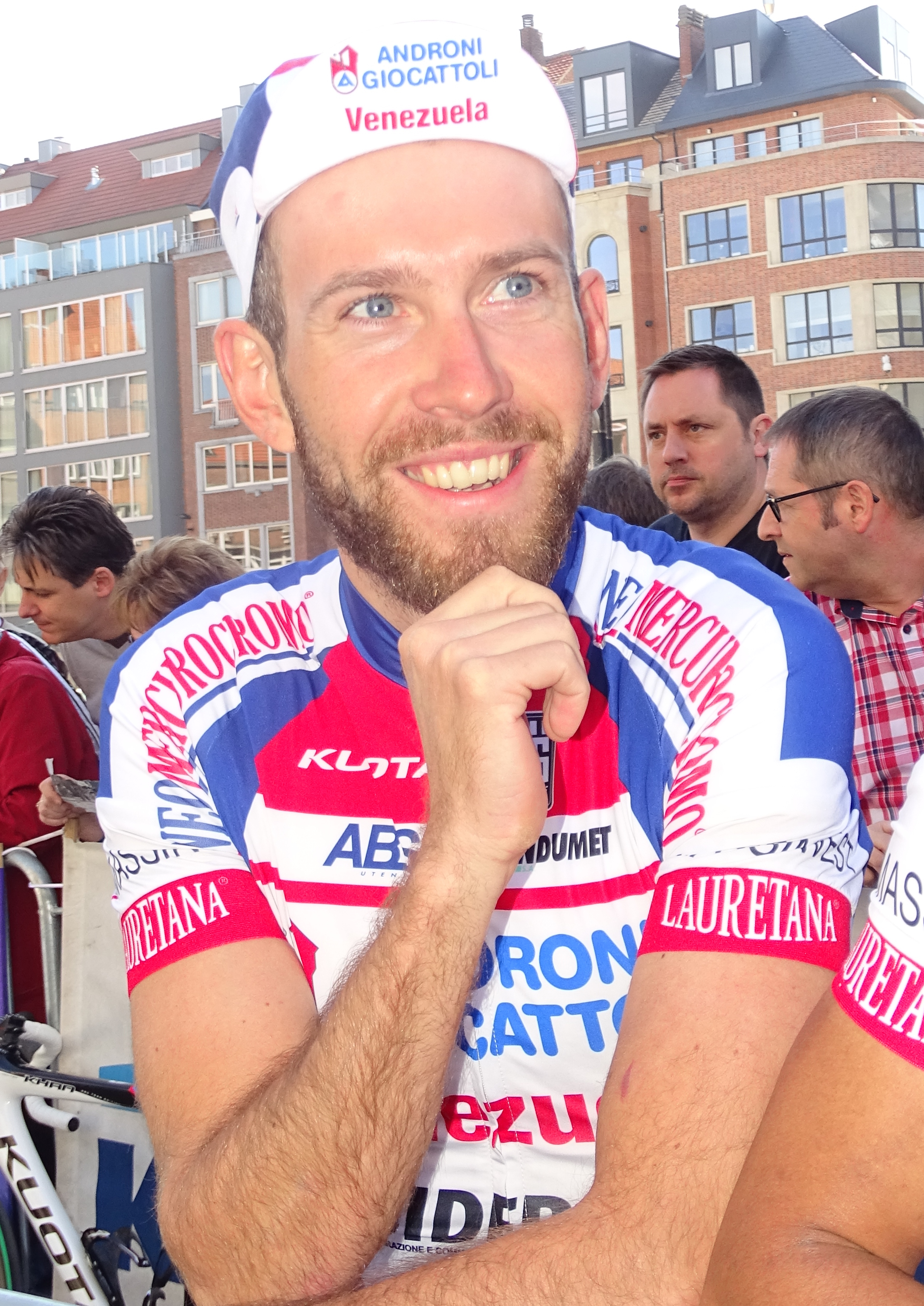
- Paďour in 2015.

Personal information
- Full name: František Paďour
- Born: 19 January 1988 (age 38): Prague, Czechoslovakia; (now Czech Republic)

Cycling career
- Sport: Cycling
- Discipline: Road
- Role: Rider

Professional teams
- 2007: CK Pribram Bei
- 2008: CK Windoor's-Pribram
- 2009: PSK Whirlpool–Author
- 2011–2013: PSK Whirlpool–Author
- 2014: NetApp–Endura
- 2015: Androni Giocattoli

František Paďour (born 19 January 1988) is a Czech road bicycle racer, who last rode for UCI Professional Continental team Androni Giocattoli–Sidermec.

Padour left Bauknecht–Author at the end of the 2013 season, and joined NetApp–Endura for the 2014 season. In 2015, he signed for Androni Giocattoli.

== Major results ==
2006
1st Road race, National Junior Road Championships
7th Overall Giro della Lunigiana
2007
2nd Road race, National Under-23 Road Championships
3rd Overall Vysočina Tour
3rd Overall Haná Tour
2008
2nd Overall Soběslav Tour
7th GP Betonexpressz 2000
2009
1st Overall Vysočina Tour

1st Stage 2

1st Overall Lidice Tour
9th Grand Prix Kooperativa
2012
1st Overall Czech Cycling Tour

1st Stage 1 (TTT)

8th Tour Bohemia
2013
8th Grand Prix Královéhradeckého kraje
9th Overall Okolo Jižních Čech
2014
5th Overall Tour of Qinghai Lake
