= 2015 Bayern Rundfahrt =

2015 UCI Europe Tour

Race details
- Dates: 13–17 May
- Stages: 5
- Distance: 830.6 km (516.1 mi)
- Winning time: 20h 07' 29"

Results
Jersey awarded to the overall winner	Winner	Alex Dowsett (GBR)	(Movistar Team)
	Second	Tiago Machado (POR)	(Team Katusha)
	Third	Jan Bárta (CZE)	(Bora–Argon 18)
Jersey awarded to the points classification winner	Points	John Degenkolb (GER)	(Team Giant–Alpecin)
	Mountains	Frederik Veuchelen (BEL)	(Wanty–Groupe Gobert)
Jersey awarded to the youth classification winner	Youth	Dylan van Baarle (NED)	(Cannondale–Garmin)
	Team	Cannondale–Garmin	

The 2015 Bayern Rundfahrt was the 36th edition of the Bayern Rundfahrt, an annual cycling road race. It was held between 13 and 17 May, starting in Regensburg and ending in Nürnberg. The race consisted of five stages, the fourth being an individual time trial.

== Schedule ==
Stage	Date	Course	Distance	Type	Winner	Ref
1	13 May	Regensburg to Waldsassen	221.3 km (137.5 mi)	Intermediate stage	Sam Bennett (IRL)	
2	14 May	Waldsassen to Selb	179.5 km (111.5 mi)	Intermediate stage	John Degenkolb (GER)	
3	15 May	Selb to Ebern	205.9 km (127.9 mi)	Hilly stage	Sam Bennett (IRL)	
4	16 May	Haßfurt to Haßfurt	26.1 km (16.2 mi)	Individual time trial	Alex Dowsett (GBR)	
5	17 May	Haßfurt to Nürnberg	197.8 km (122.9 mi)	Flat stage	John Degenkolb (GER)	
Total		830.6 km (516.1 mi)				

== Teams ==
19 teams were selected to take place in the 2015 Bayern–Rundfahrt. Five of these were UCI WorldTeams, eight were UCI Professional Continental teams and six were UCI Continental teams.

UCI WorldTeams

- IAM Cycling
- Movistar Team
- Cannondale–Garmin
- Team Katusha
- Team Giant–Alpecin

UCI Professional Continental teams

- MTN–Qhubeka
- Cofidis
- Southeast Pro Cycling
- Colombia
- Bora–Argon 18
- Wanty–Groupe Gobert
- Team Roompot
- Cult Energy Pro Cycling

Continental teams

- Bike Aid
- LKT Team Brandenburg
- Rad-Net Rose Team
- Team Stölting
- Team Stuttgart
- Team Heizomat

== Stages ==
=== Stage 1 ===
13 May 2015 — Regensburg to Waldsassen, 221.3 km (137.5 mi)

Stage 1 result
Rank	Rider	Team	Time
1	Sam Bennett (IRL)	Bora–Argon 18	5h 30' 39"
2	Nacer Bouhanni (FRA)	Cofidis	+ 0"
3	John Degenkolb (GER)	Team Giant–Alpecin	+ 0"
4	Ramon Sinkeldam (NED)	Team Giant–Alpecin	+ 0"
5	Willi Willwohl (GER)	LKT Team Brandenburg	+ 0"
6	Enrique Sanz (ESP)	Movistar Team	+ 0"
7	Jonas van Genechten (BEL)	IAM Cycling	+ 0"
8	Reinardt Janse van Rensburg (RSA)	MTN–Qhubeka	+ 0"
9	Enrico Gasparotto (ITA)	Wanty–Groupe Gobert	+ 0"
10	Marco Marcato (ITA)	Wanty–Groupe Gobert	+ 0"

General classification after stage 1
Rank	Rider	Team	Time
1	Sam Bennett (IRL)	Bora–Argon 18	5h 30' 29"
2	Eduard Vorganov (RUS)	Team Katusha	+ 3"
3	Jonas Koch (GER)	Rad-Net Rose Team	+ 3"
4	Nacer Bouhanni (FRA)	Cofidis	+ 4"
5	John Degenkolb (GER)	Team Giant–Alpecin	+ 6"
6	Rodolfo Torres (COL)	Colombia	+ 8"
7	Johannes Weber (GER)	Team Stuttgart	+ 8"
8	Ramon Sinkeldam (NED)	Team Giant–Alpecin	+ 10"
9	Willi Willwohl (GER)	LKT Team Brandenburg	+ 10"
10	Enrique Sanz (ESP)	Movistar Team	+ 10"

=== Stage 2 ===
14 May 2015 — Waldsassen to Selb, 179.5 km (111.5 mi)

Stage 2 result
Rank	Rider	Team	Time
1	John Degenkolb (GER)	Team Giant–Alpecin	4h 25' 06"
2	Nacer Bouhanni (FRA)	Cofidis	+ 0"
3	Enrique Sanz (ESP)	Movistar Team	+ 0"
4	Sam Bennett (IRL)	Bora–Argon 18	+ 0"
5	Ramūnas Navardauskas (LTU)	Cannondale–Garmin	+ 0"
6	Willi Willwohl (GER)	LKT Team Brandenburg	+ 0"
7	Jonas van Genechten (BEL)	IAM Cycling	+ 0"
8	Enrico Gasparotto (ITA)	Wanty–Groupe Gobert	+ 0"
9	Reinardt Janse van Rensburg (RSA)	MTN–Qhubeka	+ 0"
10	Dylan Groenewegen (NED)	Team Roompot	+ 0"

General classification after stage 2
Rank	Rider	Team	Time
1	John Degenkolb (GER)	Team Giant–Alpecin	9h 55' 31"
2	Nacer Bouhanni (FRA)	Cofidis	+ 2"
3	Sam Bennett (IRL)	Bora–Argon 18	+ 4"
4	Jonas Koch (GER)	Rad-Net Rose Team	+ 6"
5	Eduard Vorganov (RUS)	Team Katusha	+ 7"
6	Enrique Sanz (ESP)	Movistar Team	+ 10"
7	Marco Minnaard (NED)	Wanty–Groupe Gobert	+ 10"
8	Jasha Sütterlin (GER)	Movistar Team	+ 11"
9	Johannes Weber (GER)	Team Stuttgart	+ 12"
10	Rodolfo Torres (COL)	Colombia	+ 12"

=== Stage 3 ===
15 May 2015 — Selb to Ebern, 205.9 km (127.9 mi)

Stage 3 result
Rank	Rider	Team	Time
1	Sam Bennett (IRL)	Bora–Argon 18	4h 59' 33"
2	Nacer Bouhanni (FRA)	Cofidis	+ 0"
3	Ramūnas Navardauskas (LTU)	Cannondale–Garmin	+ 0"
4	Enrique Sanz (ESP)	Movistar Team	+ 0"
5	Jonas van Genechten (BEL)	IAM Cycling	+ 0"
6	Marco Marcato (ITA)	Wanty–Groupe Gobert	+ 0"
7	John Degenkolb (GER)	Team Giant–Alpecin	+ 0"
8	Christophe Laporte (FRA)	Cofidis	+ 2"
9	Reinardt Janse van Rensburg (RSA)	MTN–Qhubeka	+ 2"
10	Fabian Wegmann (GER)	Cult Energy Pro Cycling	+ 2"

General classification after stage 3
Rank	Rider	Team	Time
1	Sam Bennett (IRL)	Bora–Argon 18	14h 54' 58"
2	Nacer Bouhanni (FRA)	Cofidis	+ 2"
3	John Degenkolb (GER)	Team Giant–Alpecin	+ 3"
4	Jonas Koch (GER)	Rad-Net Rose Team	+ 14"
5	Eduard Vorganov (RUS)	Team Katusha	+ 15"
6	Enrique Sanz (ESP)	Movistar Team	+ 16"
7	Ramūnas Navardauskas (LTU)	Cannondale–Garmin	+ 16"
8	Jack Bauer (NZL)	Cannondale–Garmin	+ 18"
9	Marco Minnaard (NED)	Wanty–Groupe Gobert	+ 18"
10	Jasha Sütterlin (GER)	Movistar Team	+ 19"

=== Stage 4 ===
16 May 2015 — Haßfurt to Haßfurt, 26.1 km (16.2 mi), individual time trial (ITT)

Stage 4 result
Rank	Rider	Team	Time
1	Alex Dowsett (GBR)	Movistar Team	31' 33"
2	Tiago Machado (POR)	Team Katusha	+ 1"
3	Jan Bárta (CZE)	Bora–Argon 18	+ 16"
4	Ramūnas Navardauskas (LTU)	Cannondale–Garmin	+ 26"
5	Dylan van Baarle (NED)	Cannondale–Garmin	+ 29"
6	Nils Politt (GER)	Team Stölting	+ 31"
7	Larry Warbasse (USA)	IAM Cycling	+ 45"
8	Jack Bauer (NZL)	Cannondale–Garmin	+ 48"
9	Gustav Larsson (SWE)	Cult Energy Pro Cycling	+ 50"
10	Berden de Vries (NED)	Team Roompot	+ 51"

General classification after stage 4
Rank	Rider	Team	Time
1	Alex Dowsett (GBR)	Movistar Team	15h 26' 51"
2	Tiago Machado (POR)	Team Katusha	+ 2"
3	Jan Bárta (CZE)	Bora–Argon 18	+ 18"
4	Ramūnas Navardauskas (LTU)	Cannondale–Garmin	+ 22"
5	Dylan van Baarle (NED)	Cannondale–Garmin	+ 31"
6	Nils Politt (GER)	Team Stölting	+ 33"
7	Jack Bauer (NZL)	Cannondale–Garmin	+ 46"
8	Larry Warbasse (USA)	IAM Cycling	+ 47"
9	Gustav Larsson (SWE)	Cult Energy Pro Cycling	+ 52"
10	Jasha Sütterlin (GER)	Movistar Team	+ 53"

=== Stage 5 ===
17 May 2015 — Haßfurt to Nürnberg, 197.8 km (122.9 mi)

Stage 5 result
Rank	Rider	Team	Time
1	John Degenkolb (GER)	Team Giant–Alpecin	4h 40' 38"
2	Rüdiger Selig (GER)	Team Katusha	+ 0"
3	Sam Bennett (IRL)	Bora–Argon 18	+ 0"
4	Dylan Groenewegen (NED)	Team Roompot	+ 0"
5	Michael Carbel (DEN)	Cult Energy Pro Cycling	+ 0"
6	Reinardt Janse van Rensburg (RSA)	MTN–Qhubeka	+ 0"
7	Rafael Andriato (BRA)	Southeast Pro Cycling	+ 0"
8	Jonas van Genechten (BEL)	IAM Cycling	+ 0"
9	Willi Willwohl (GER)	LKT Team Brandenburg	+ 0"
10	Nacer Bouhanni (FRA)	Cofidis	+ 0"

Final general classification
Rank	Rider	Team	Time
1	Alex Dowsett (GBR)	Movistar Team	20h 07' 29"
2	Tiago Machado (POR)	Team Katusha	+ 2"
3	Jan Bárta (CZE)	Bora–Argon 18	+ 18"
4	Ramūnas Navardauskas (LTU)	Cannondale–Garmin	+ 22"
5	Dylan van Baarle (NED)	Cannondale–Garmin	+ 31"
6	Nils Politt (GER)	Team Stölting	+ 33"
7	Jack Bauer (NZL)	Cannondale–Garmin	+ 46"
8	Larry Warbasse (USA)	IAM Cycling	+ 47"
9	Gustav Larsson (SWE)	Cult Energy Pro Cycling	+ 52"
10	Jasha Sütterlin (GER)	Movistar Team	+ 53"

== Classification leadership table ==
Stage	Winner	General classification	Points classification	Mountains classification	Young rider classification	Teams classification
1	Sam Bennett	Sam Bennett	Jonas Koch	Rodolfo Torres	Jonas Koch	Wanty–Groupe Gobert
2	John Degenkolb	John Degenkolb	John Degenkolb	Marco Minnaard	Jonas Koch	Wanty–Groupe Gobert
3	Sam Bennett	Sam Bennett	Sam Bennett	Simone Antonini	Jonas Koch	Wanty–Groupe Gobert
4	Alex Dowsett	Alex Dowsett	Sam Bennett	Simone Antonini	Dylan van Baarle	Cannondale–Garmin
5	John Degenkolb	Alex Dowsett	John Degenkolb	Frederik Veuchelen	Dylan van Baarle	Cannondale–Garmin
Final		Alex Dowsett	John Degenkolb	Frederik Veuchelen	Dylan van Baarle	Cannondale–Garmin

== Final standings ==
=== General classification ===
Final general classification
Rank	Rider	Team	Time
1	Alex Dowsett (GBR)	Movistar Team	20h 07' 29"
2	Tiago Machado (POR)	Team Katusha	+ 2"
3	Jan Bárta (CZE)	Bora–Argon 18	+ 18"
4	Ramūnas Navardauskas (LTU)	Cannondale–Garmin	+ 22"
5	Dylan van Baarle (NED)	Cannondale–Garmin	+ 31"
6	Nils Politt (GER)	Team Stölting	+ 33"
7	Jack Bauer (NZL)	Cannondale–Garmin	+ 46"
8	Larry Warbasse (USA)	IAM Cycling	+ 47"
9	Gustav Larsson (SWE)	Cult Energy Pro Cycling	+ 52"
10	Jasha Sütterlin (GER)	Movistar Team	+ 53"

=== Points classification ===
Final points classification
Rank	Rider	Team	Points
1	John Degenkolb (GER)	Team Giant–Alpecin	16
2	Eduard Vorganov (RUS)	Team Katusha	16
3	Sam Bennett (IRL)	Bora–Argon 18	15
4	Nacer Bouhanni (FRA)	Cofidis	12
5	Jonas Koch (GER)	Rad-Net Rose Team	8
6	Enrique Sanz (ESP)	Movistar Team	5
7	Jack Bauer (NZL)	Cannondale–Garmin	4
8	Marco Minnaard (NED)	Wanty–Groupe Gobert	4
9	Patrick Schelling (SUI)	IAM Cycling	4
10	Ramūnas Navardauskas (LTU)	Cannondale–Garmin	4

=== Mountains classification ===
Final mountains classification
Rank	Rider	Team	Points
1	Frederik Veuchelen (BEL)	Wanty–Groupe Gobert	13
2	Simone Antonini (ITA)	Wanty–Groupe Gobert	9
3	Louis Meintjes (RSA)	MTN–Qhubeka	9
4	Marco Minnaard (NED)	Wanty–Groupe Gobert	6
5	Sascha Starker (GER)	Team Heizomat	5
6	Eduard Vorganov (RUS)	Team Katusha	4
7	Marc de Maar (NED)	Team Roompot	3
8	Adrien Niyonshuti (RWA)	MTN–Qhubeka	2
9	Thomas Koep (GER)	Team Stölting	2
10	Patrick Schelling (SUI)	IAM Cycling	1

=== Young rider classification ===
Final young rider classification
Rank	Rider	Team	Time
1	Dylan van Baarle (NED)	Cannondale–Garmin	20h 08' 00"
2	Nils Politt (GER)	Team Stölting	+ 2"
3	Jasha Sütterlin (GER)	Movistar Team	+ 22"
4	Lennard Kämna (GER)	Team Stölting	+ 35"
5	Alberto Bettiol (ITA)	Cannondale–Garmin	+ 1' 31"
6	Willi Willwohl (GER)	LKT Team Brandenburg	+ 1' 32"
7	Christophe Laporte (FRA)	Cofidis	+ 1' 39"
8	Leon Rohde (GER)	LKT Team Brandenburg	+ 1' 40"
9	Merhawi Kudus (ERI)	MTN–Qhubeka	+ 2' 07"
10	Giuseppe Fonzi (ITA)	Southeast Pro Cycling	+ 2' 14"

=== Teams classification ===
Final teams classification
Rank	Team	Time
1	Cannondale–Garmin	60h 24' 14"
2	Movistar Team	+ 16"
3	Team Katusha	+ 27"
4	Bora–Argon 18	+ 1' 42"
5	IAM Cycling	+ 1' 59"
6	Cult Energy Pro Cycling	+ 2' 04"
7	Wanty–Groupe Gobert	+ 3' 01"
8	Team Stölting	+ 3' 17"
9	MTN–Qhubeka	+ 4' 28"
10	Team Roompot	+ 4' 59"
