= 2016 Bora–Argon 18 season =

Bora–Argon 18
- 2016 season
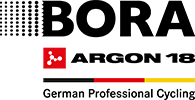
- UCI code: BOA
- Status: UCI Professional Continental
- Manager: Ralph Denk
- Main sponsor(s): BORA & Argon 18
- Based: Germany
- Bicycles: Argon 18

Season victories
- One-day races: 2
- Stage race stages: 7
- National Championships: 1
- Most wins: Sam Bennett, Phil Bauhaus (3)
- Best ranked rider: Sam Bennett
- Jersey

The 2016 season for the Bora–Argon 18 cycling team began in January at the Trofeo Felanitx-Ses Salines-Campos-Porreres. The team participated in UCI Continental Circuits and UCI World Tour events when given a wildcard invitation.

== Team roster ==
Rider	Date of birth
Shane Archbold (NZL)	2 February 1989 (aged 26)
Jan Bárta (CZE)	7 December 1984 (aged 31)
Phil Bauhaus (GER)	8 July 1994 (aged 21)
Cesare Benedetti (ITA)	3 August 1987 (aged 28)
Sam Bennett (IRL)	16 October 1990 (aged 25)
Emanuel Buchmann (GER)	18 November 1992 (aged 23)
Zak Dempster (AUS)	27 September 1987 (aged 28)
Silvio Herklotz (GER)	6 May 1994 (aged 21)
Bartosz Huzarski (POL)	27 October 1980 (aged 35)
Patrick Konrad (AUT)	13 October 1991 (aged 24)
Ralf Matzka (GER)	24 August 1989 (aged 26)

Rider	Date of birth
José Mendes (POR)	24 April 1985 (aged 30)
Gregor Mühlberger (AUT)	4 April 1994 (aged 21)
Dominik Nerz (GER)	25 August 1989 (aged 26)
Christoph Pfingsten (GER)	20 November 1987 (aged 28)
Lukas Pöstlberger (AUT)	10 January 1992 (aged 23)
Andreas Schillinger (GER)	13 July 1983 (aged 32)
Daniel Schorn (AUT)	21 October 1988 (aged 27)
Rüdiger Selig (GER)	19 February 1989 (aged 26)
Michael Schwarzmann (GER)	7 January 1991 (aged 24)
Scott Thwaites (GBR)	12 February 1990 (aged 25)
Paul Voss (GER)	26 March 1986 (aged 29)

Riders who joined the team for the 2016 season

Rider	2015 team
Silvio Herklotz	neo-pro (Stölting Service Group)
Lukas Pöstlberger	neo-pro (Tirol Cycling Team)
Rüdiger Selig	Team Katusha

Riders who left the team during or after the 2015 season

Rider	2016 team
Cristiano Salerno	Retired
Björn Thurau	Wanty–Groupe Gobert

== Season victories ==
Date	Race	Competition	Rider	Country	Location
15 March	Tirreno–Adriatico, Mountains classification	UCI World Tour	Cesare Benedetti (ITA)	Italy	
26 March	Critérium International, Stage 1	UCI Europe Tour	Sam Bennett (IRL)	France	Porto-Vecchio
4 May	Tour d'Azerbaïdjan, Stage 1	UCI Europe Tour	Phil Bauhaus (GER)	Azerbaijan	Sumqayit
8 May	Tour d'Azerbaïdjan, Stage 5	UCI Europe Tour	Michael Schwarzmann (GER)	Azerbaijan	Baku
17 June	Oberösterreichrundfahrt, Stage 2	UCI Europe Tour	Phil Bauhaus (GER)	Austria	Altheim
19 June	Oberösterreichrundfahrt, Stage 4	UCI Europe Tour	Lukas Pöstlberger (AUT)	Austria	Windischgarsten
19 June	Oberösterreichrundfahrt, Teams classification	UCI Europe Tour	(Note: The riders on the squad were Phil Bauhaus, Zak Dempster, Silvio Herklotz, Lukas Pöstlberger and Michael Schwarzmann)	Austria	
31 July	Rad am Ring	UCI Europe Tour	Paul Voss (GER)	Germany	Nürburgring
31 July	Danmark Rundt, Stage 5	UCI Europe Tour	Phil Bauhaus (GER)	Denmark	Frederiksberg
21 September	Giro di Toscana, Stage 2	UCI Europe Tour	Sam Bennett (IRL)	Italy	Pontedera
21 September	Giro di Toscana, Points classification	UCI Europe Tour	Sam Bennett (IRL)	Italy	
6 October	Paris–Bourges	UCI Europe Tour	Sam Bennett (IRL)	France	Bourges

== National, Continental and World champions 2016 ==
Date	Discipline	Jersey	Rider	Country	Location
26 June	Portuguese National Road Race Champion		José Mendes (POR)	Portugal	Braga
