= Jan Dieteren =

German cyclist (born 1993)

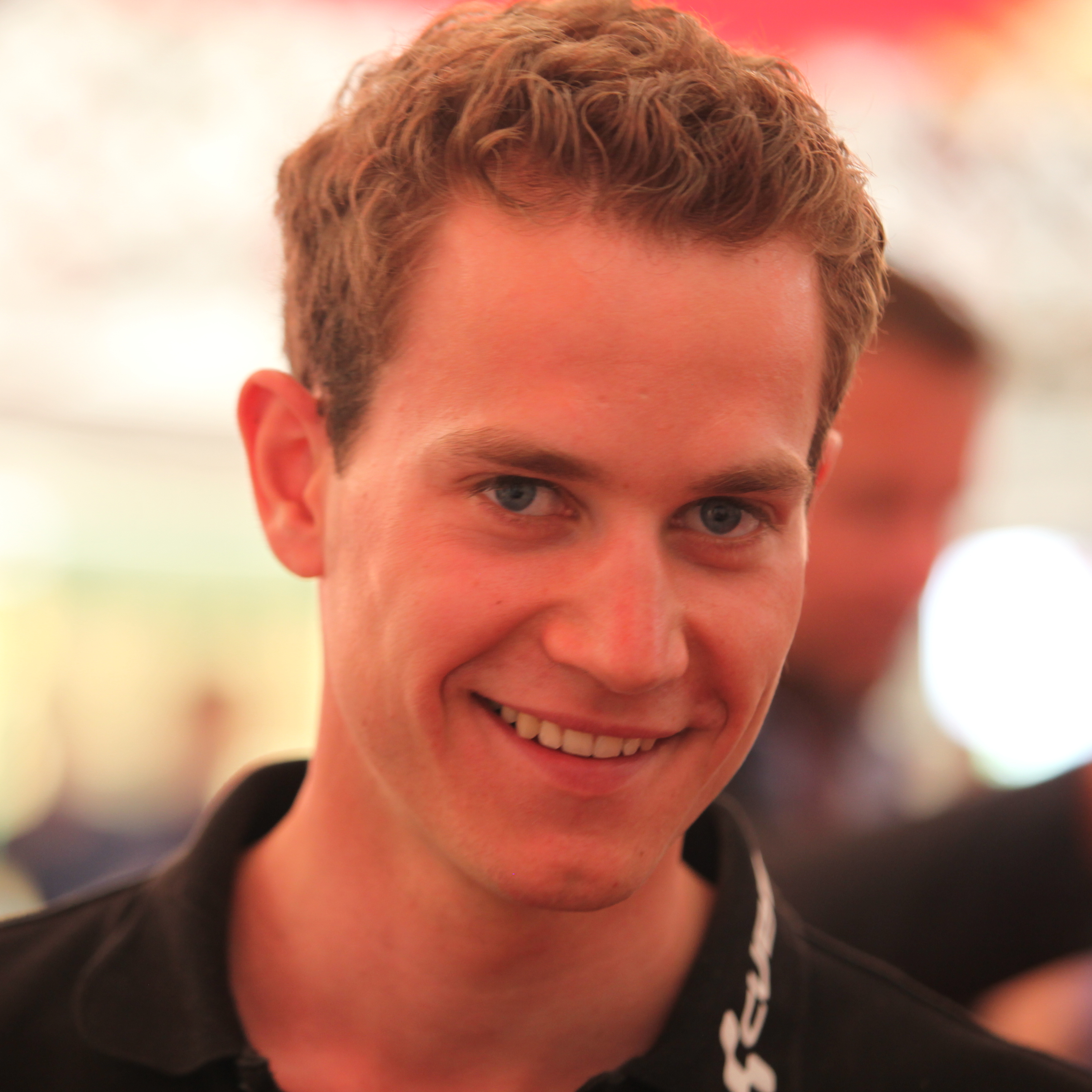
- Dieteren in 2014

Personal information
- Full name: Jan Dieteren
- Born: 12 April 1993 (age 33) Bensheim, Germany

Cycling career
- Sport: Cycling
- Current team: RSC Kempten
- Discipline: Road
- Role: Rider

Amateur teams
- 2005–2011: SSG Bensheim
- 2010–2011: Fachklinik Dr. Herzog–SV Sparkassenversicherung–Hessen
- 2011: Berner-Bikes.com + Compression-x.de
- 2019: SSG Bensheim
- 2020–: RSC Kempten

Professional teams
- 2012–2014: Team Raiko–Stölting
- 2015–2017: Leopard Development Team
- 2018: LKT Team Brandenburg

Jan Dieteren (born 12 April 1993) is a German cyclist, who currently rides for German amateur team RSV Kempten.

In early 2016, he was diagnosed with testicular cancer. Because of this, he did not compete during the 2016 season, but resumed competition in April 2017. Dieteren failed to finish any races in 2017 either.

== Major results ==
2010
2nd Time trial, National Junior Road Championships
2012
1st Stage 3 Thüringen Rundfahrt der U23
2013
1st Stage 2 Thüringen Rundfahrt der U23
9th Sparkassen Münsterland Giro
10th Kernen Omloop Echt-Susteren
2014
4th Overall Tour de Taiwan
8th Rund um den Finanzplatz Eschborn–Frankfurt
8th La Côte Picarde
2015
3rd La Roue Tourangelle
4th Kernen Omloop Echt-Susteren
7th Antwerpse Havenpijl
8th La Côte Picarde
9th De Kustpijl
