= Jonas Tenbrock =

German cyclist

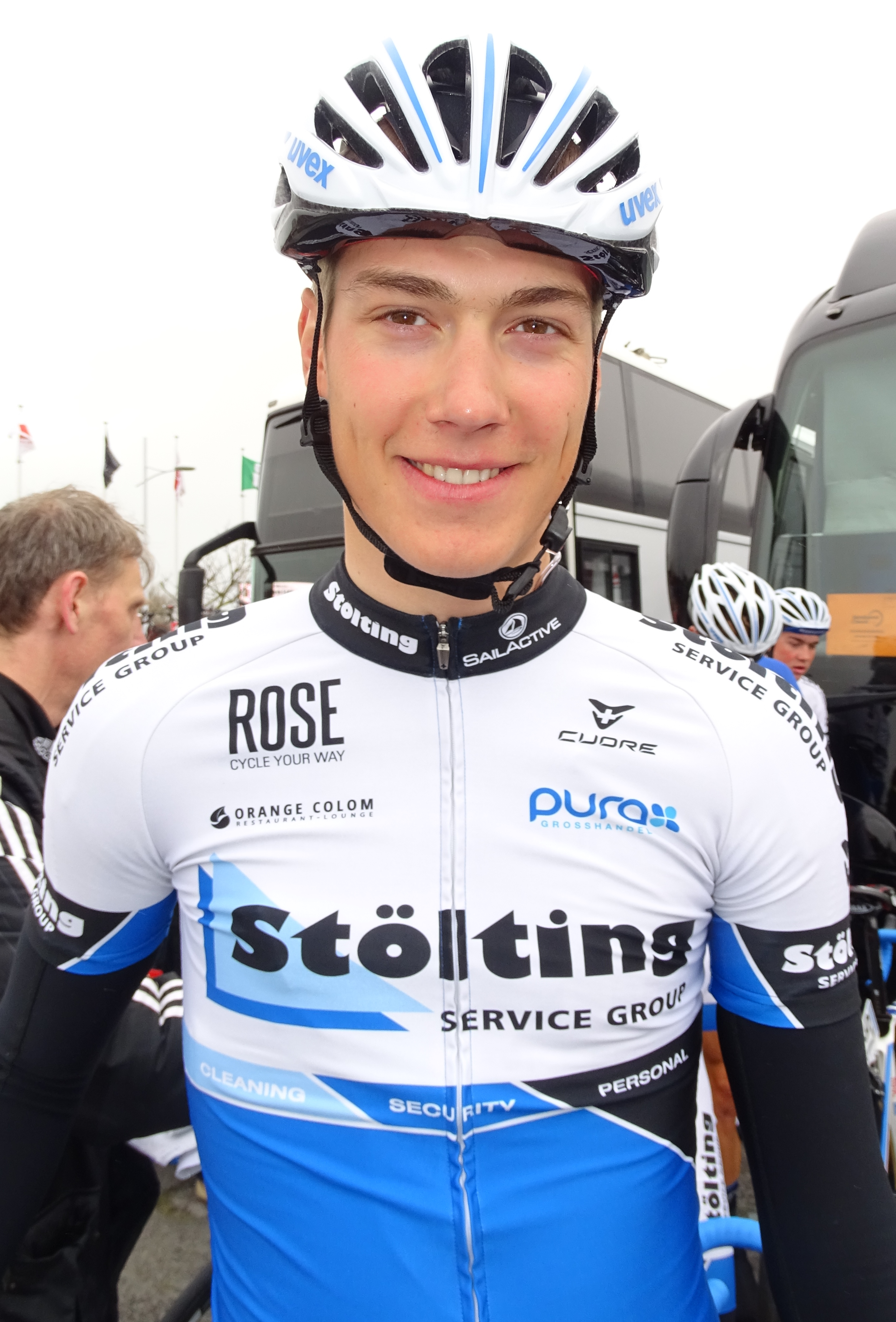
- Tenbrock at the 2016 Handzame Classic

Personal information
- Full name: Jonas Tenbrock
- Born: 16 December 1995 (age 30) Bocholt, Germany
- Height: 1.92 m (6 ft 4 in)
- Weight: 74 kg (163 lb)

Cycling career
- Sport: Cycling
- Current team: Retired
- Discipline: Road
- Role: Rider

Amateur teams
- 2008–2014: RC Bocholt 1977
- 2012–2014: Rose Team NRW
- 2014: Team Stölting (stagiaire)

Professional teams
- 2015–2016: Team Stölting
- 2017: Team Lotto–Kern Haus

Jonas Tenbrock (born 16 December 1995) is a German former professional cyclist.
