= Robert Kessler (cyclist) =

German cyclist

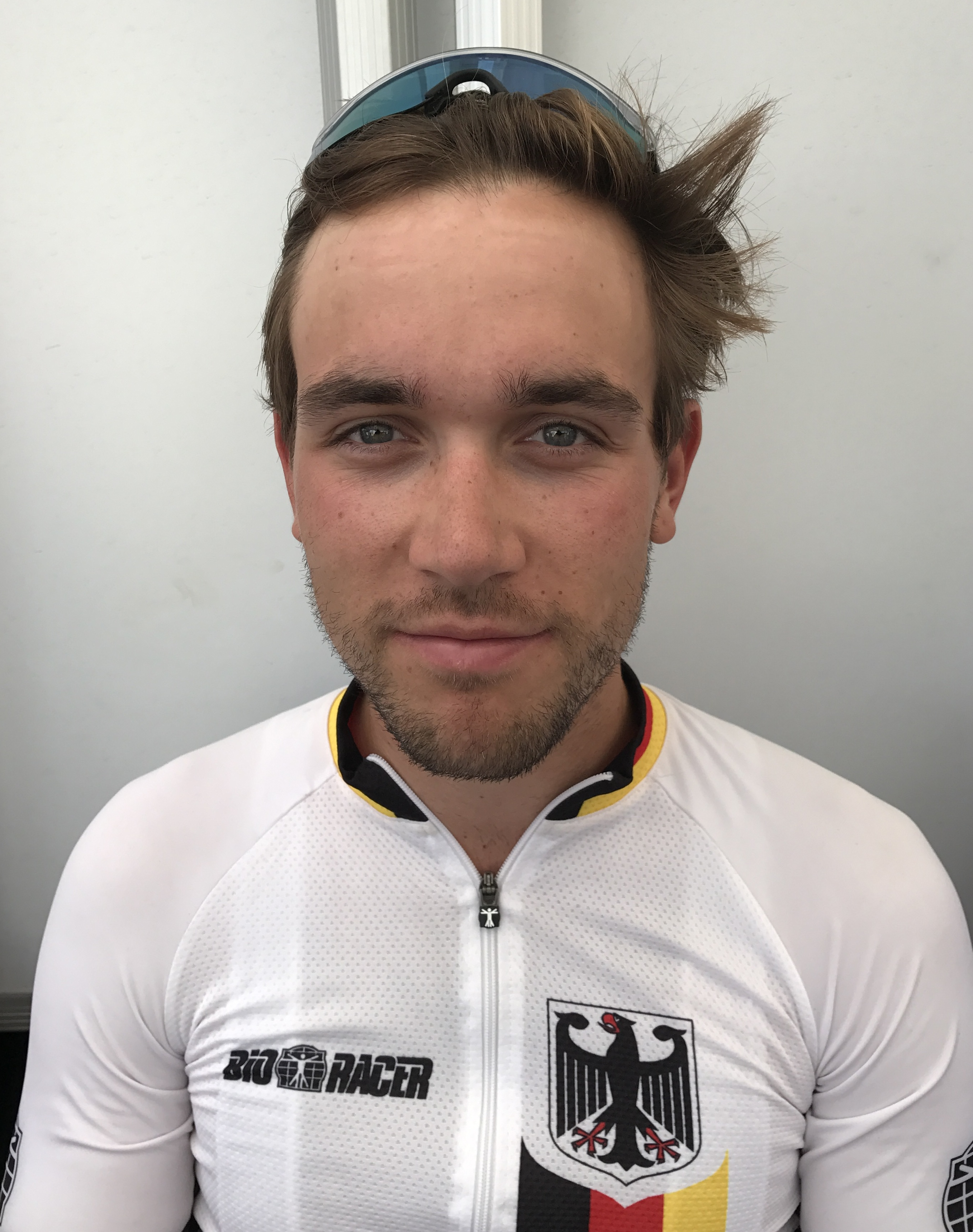
- Kessler in 2017

Personal information
- Full name: Robert William Kessler
- Born: 30 October 1995 (age 30) Berlin, Germany
- Height: 1.84 m (6 ft 0 in)
- Weight: 78 kg (172 lb)

Cycling career
- Sport: Cycling
- Current team: Retired
- Discipline: Road
- Role: Rider

Amateur teams
- 2005–2010: Erkneraner RC 1996
- 2011–2013: Frankfurter RC 90
- 2012: RSC Cottbus–FRC 90 Frankfurt
- 2013: Landesverband Brandenburg

Professional teams
- 2014–2017: LKT Team Brandenburg
- 2018–2020: Team Lotto–Kern Haus

Robert William Kessler (born 30 October 1995) is a German former racing cyclist, who rode professionally between 2014 and 2020, for LKT Team Brandenburg and Team Lotto–Kern Haus. He rode for Team Lotto–Kern Haus in the men's team time trial event at the 2018 UCI Road World Championships.

== Major results ==
2015
1st Sprints classification, Sibiu Cycling Tour
10th Overall Dookoła Mazowsza
2017
3rd Overall Carpathian Couriers Race
7th Gooikse Pijl
10th Trofej Umag
2019
6th Overall Szlakiem Walk Majora Hubala
7th Memorial Van Coningsloo
8th Midden–Brabant Poort Omloop
