= Maximilian Werda =

German cyclist

Personal information
- Born: 5 October 1991 (age 35) Kaulsdorf, Germany

Cycling career
- Sport: Cycling
- Current team: Retired
- Discipline: Road
- Role: Rider

Professional teams
- 2012: Thüringer Energie Team
- 2013–2015: Team Stölting

Maximilian Werda (born 5 October 1991 in Kaulsdorf) is a German cyclist.

== Palmares ==
2013
2nd U23 National Road Race Championships
3rd Eschborn-Frankfurt City Loop U23
2014
1st Overall Tour of Malopolska

1st Stages 2 & 3

5th Overall Istrian Spring Trophy
