= Thomas Koep =

German cyclist (born 1990)

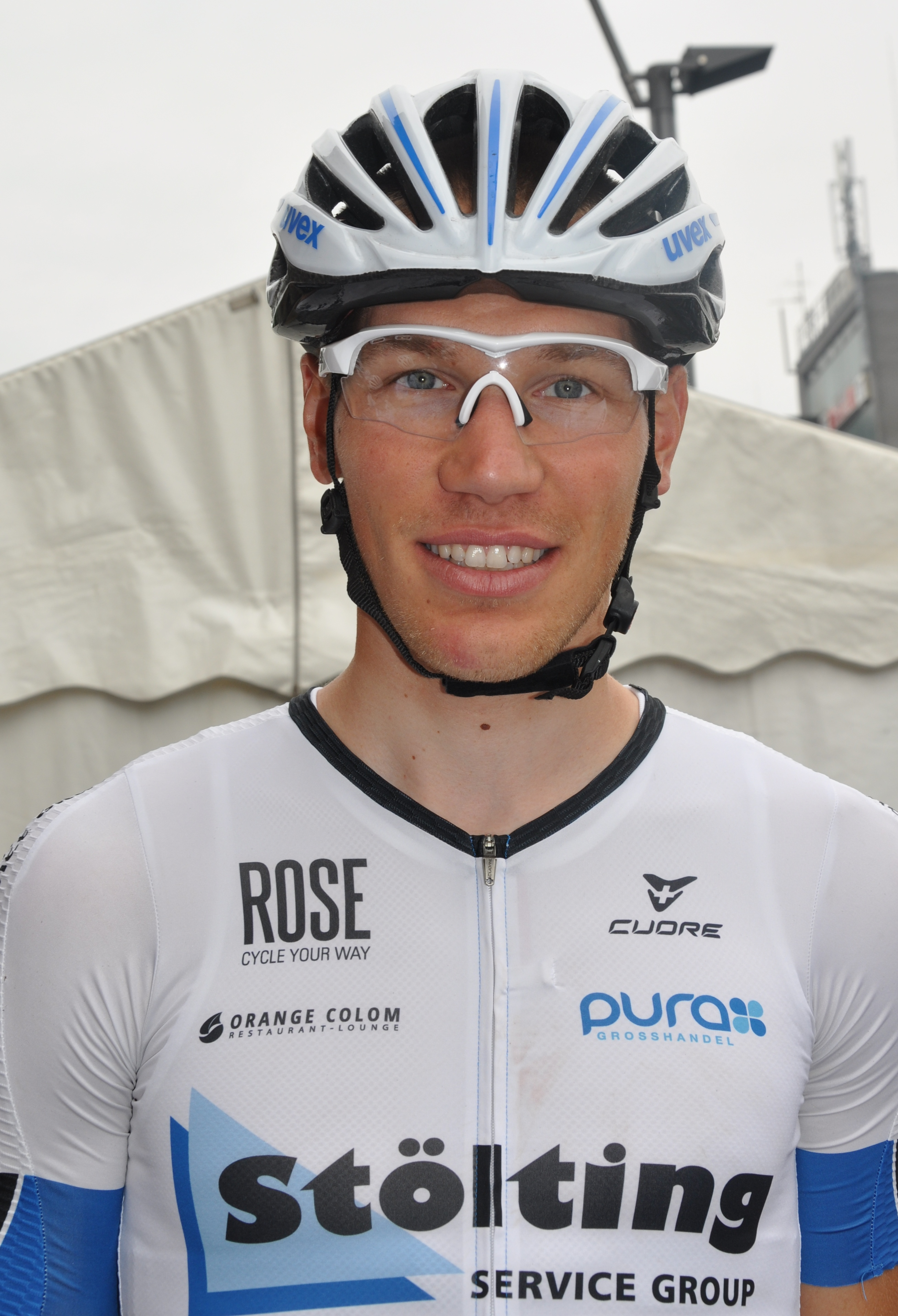
- Koep in 2016

Personal information
- Born: 15 September 1990 (age 36) Cologne, Germany
- Height: 1.89 m (6 ft 2 in)
- Weight: 78 kg (172 lb)

Cycling career
- Sport: Cycling
- Current team: Team Embrace The World Cycling
- Discipline: Road
- Role: Rider

Amateur teams
- 2010: EGN–Rose–NRW
- 2017–: Team Embrace The World Cycling

Professional team
- 2011–2016: Test Team Raiko–Argon 18

Thomas Koep (born 15 September 1990 in Cologne) is a German cyclist, who currently rides for Team Embrace The World Cycling.

== Major results ==
2010
7th Overall Mainfranken-Tour
2011
2nd Overall Tour de Berlin
