= Silvio Herklotz =

German bicycle racer

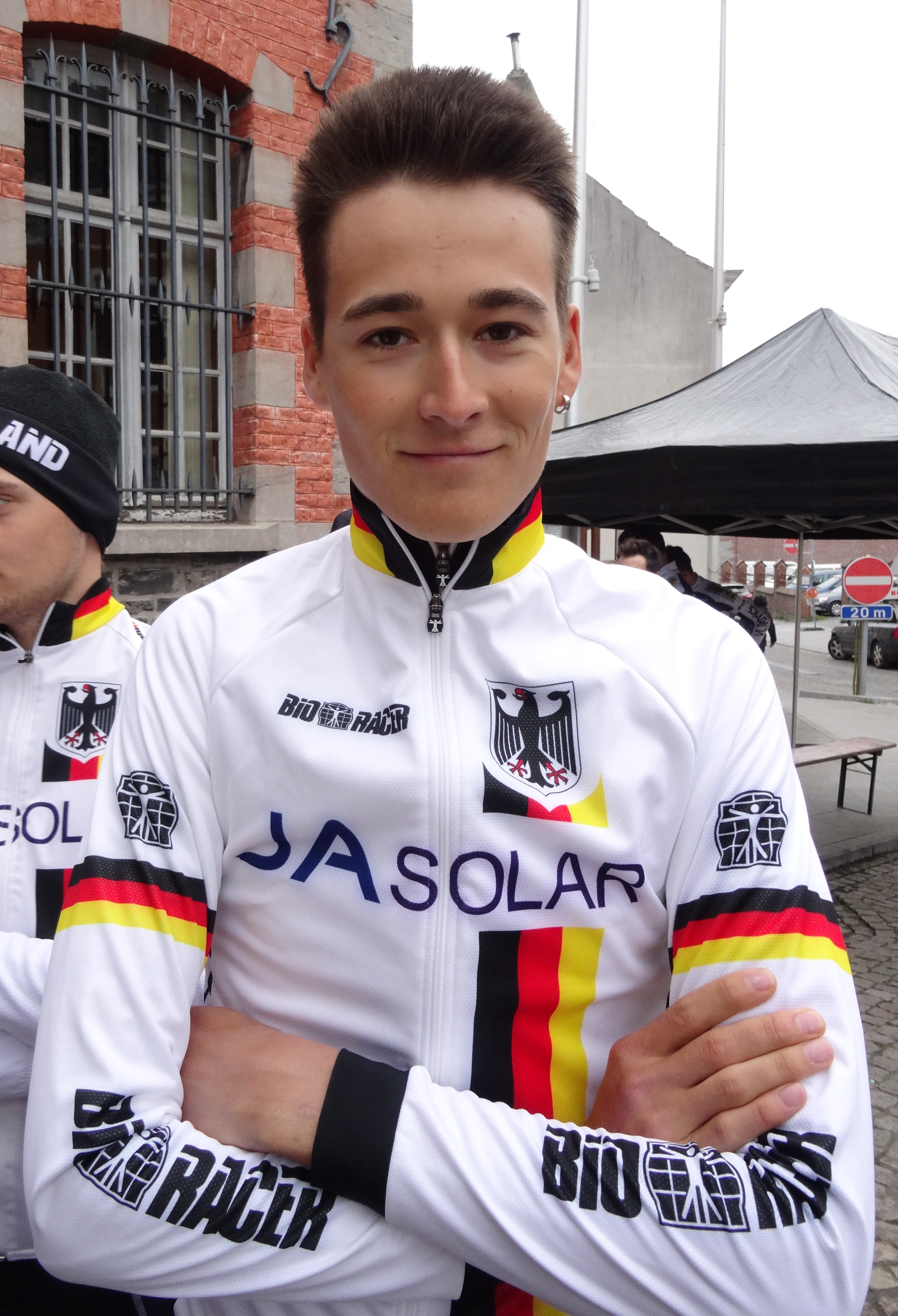
- Herklotz in 2014.

Personal information
- Full name: Silvio Herklotz
- Born: 6 May 1994 (age 32) Blankenfelde-Mahlow, Germany
- Height: 1.90 m (6 ft 3 in)
- Weight: 68 kg (150 lb)

Cycling career
- Sport: Cycling
- Current team: Retired
- Discipline: Road
- Role: Rider

Amateur teams
- 2005–2010: RSV Werner Otto Berlin
- 2011–2012: Harvestehuder RSV v. 1909
- 2011: Alfred-Lippert-Team Berlin
- 2012: Stevens U19 Racing Team

Professional teams
- 2013–2015: Team Stölting
- 2016–2017: Bora–Argon 18
- 2018: Burgos BH

Silvio Herklotz (born 6 May 1994 in Blankenfelde-Mahlow) is a German former cyclist, who rode professionally between 2013 and 2018 for the Team Stölting, Bora–Hansgrohe and Burgos BH teams. He competed in one Grand Tour during his career – the 2016 Vuelta a España – but he failed to finish. Herklotz's retirement was following a diagnosis for lyme disease; he moved into a business role post-retirement.

== Major results ==
2011
5th Overall Giro della Lunigiana
6th Road race, UEC European Junior Road Championships
8th Junior race, UCI Cyclo-cross World Championships
2012
2nd Overall Giro della Lunigiana

1st Points classification
1st Mountains classification
1st Stages 2, 3 & 4

2nd Overall GP Général Patton
7th Junior race, UCI Cyclo-cross World Championships
9th Road race, UEC European Junior Road Championships
2013
1st Road race, National Under-23 Road Championships
1st Overall Tour Alsace

1st Young rider classification
1st Stage 5

1st Young rider classification Szlakiem Grodów Piastowskich
2nd Giro del Belvedere
2nd Gran Premio Palio del Recioto
4th Overall Istrian Spring Trophy
4th Eschborn–Frankfurt Under–23
8th Road race, UCI Under-23 Road World Championships
8th Overall Thüringen Rundfahrt der U23
2014
1st Gran Premio Palio del Recioto
2nd Giro del Belvedere
3rd Overall Szlakiem Grodów Piastowskich

1st Young rider classification

6th Overall Tour de Luxembourg
8th Overall Rhône-Alpes Isère Tour

1st Young rider classification

9th Road race, UCI Under-23 Road World Championships
10th Road race, UEC European Under-23 Road Championships
2015
1st Points classification Tour of Małopolska
2nd Liège–Bastogne–Liège U23
3rd Overall Istrian Spring Trophy
5th Overall Carpathian Couriers Race
5th Giro del Belvedere
7th Overall Szlakiem Grodów Piastowskich

1st Young rider classification

10th Trofeo Banca Popolare di Vicenza
2016
9th Overall Oberösterreich Rundfahrt
10th Overall Tour d'Azerbaïdjan
2017
4th Overall Czech Cycling Tour

=== Grand Tour general classification results timeline ===
Grand Tour	2016
Giro d'Italia	—
Tour de France	—
Vuelta a España	DNF

Legend
—	Did not compete
DNF	Did not finish
