= Simone Antonini =

Italian cyclist (born 1991)

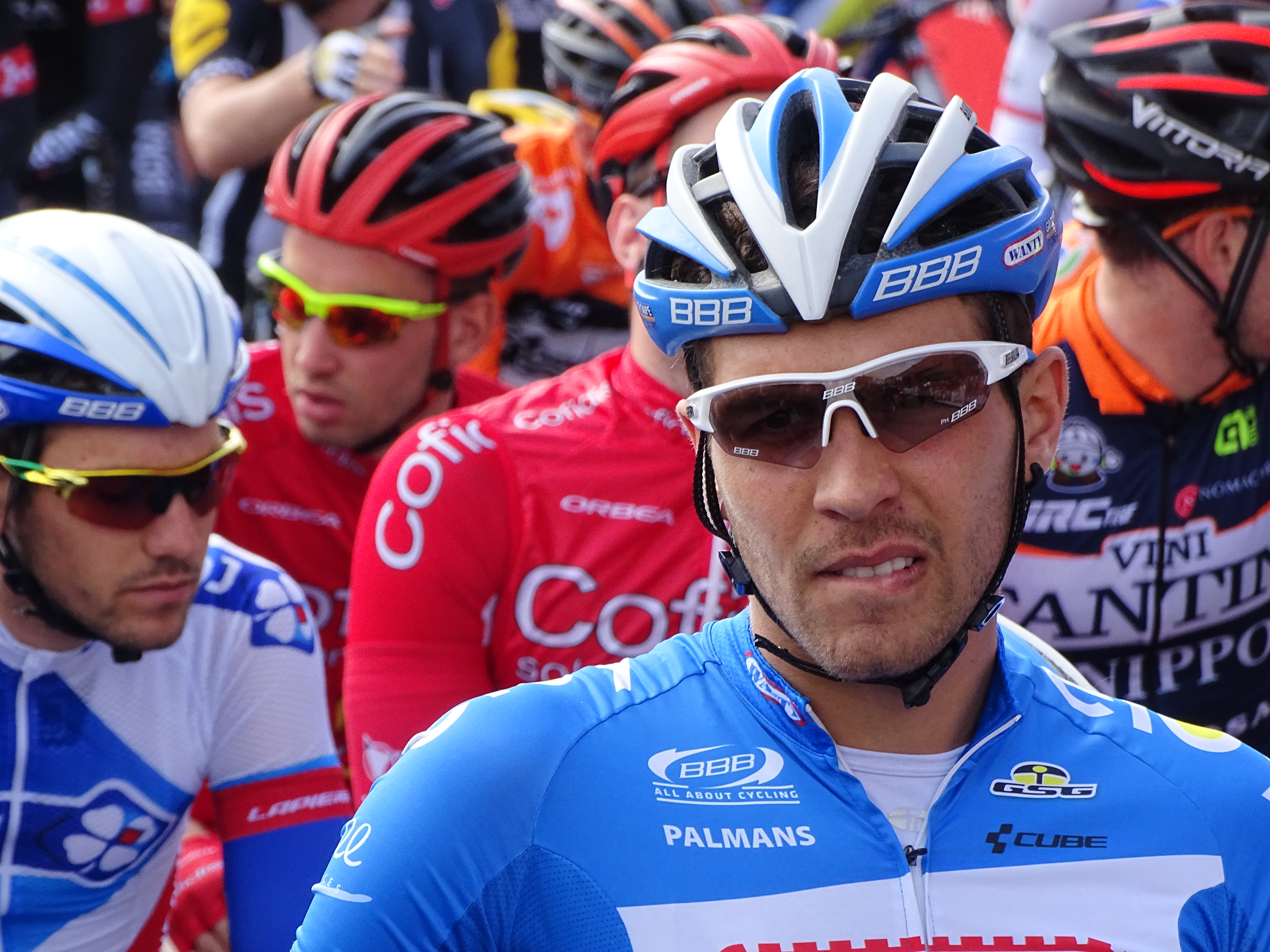
- Antonini in 2015.

Personal information
- Full name: Simone Antonini
- Born: 12 February 1991 (age 35) Empoli, Italy
- Height: 1.88 m (6 ft 2 in)
- Weight: 75 kg (165 lb)

Cycling career
- Sport: Cycling
- Current team: Retired
- Discipline: Road
- Role: Rider

Amateur teams
- 2008: Stabbia Iperfinish Pratese Grassi
- 2010–2012: Pedale Larigiano Cargo Compass
- 2013: Mastromarco Sensi Dover Benedetti

Professional teams
- 2012: Utensilnord–Named (stagiaire)
- 2014: Marchiol–Emisfero
- 2015–2018: Wanty–Groupe Gobert

Simone Antonini (born 12 February 1991) is an Italian former professional racing cyclist, who rode professionally between 2014 and 2018 for the Marchiol–Emisfero and Wanty–Groupe Gobert squads.

== Major results ==
2008
1st Trofeo Guido Dorigo
7th GP Dell'Arno
9th Trofeo Emilio Paganessi
9th Trofeo Buffoni
2009
1st Overall Giro della Lunigiana
9th Overall Giro della Toscana
2014
1st Overall Giro del Friuli-Venezia Giulia

1st Stage 1a (TTT)
