= Willi Willwohl =

German bicycle racer

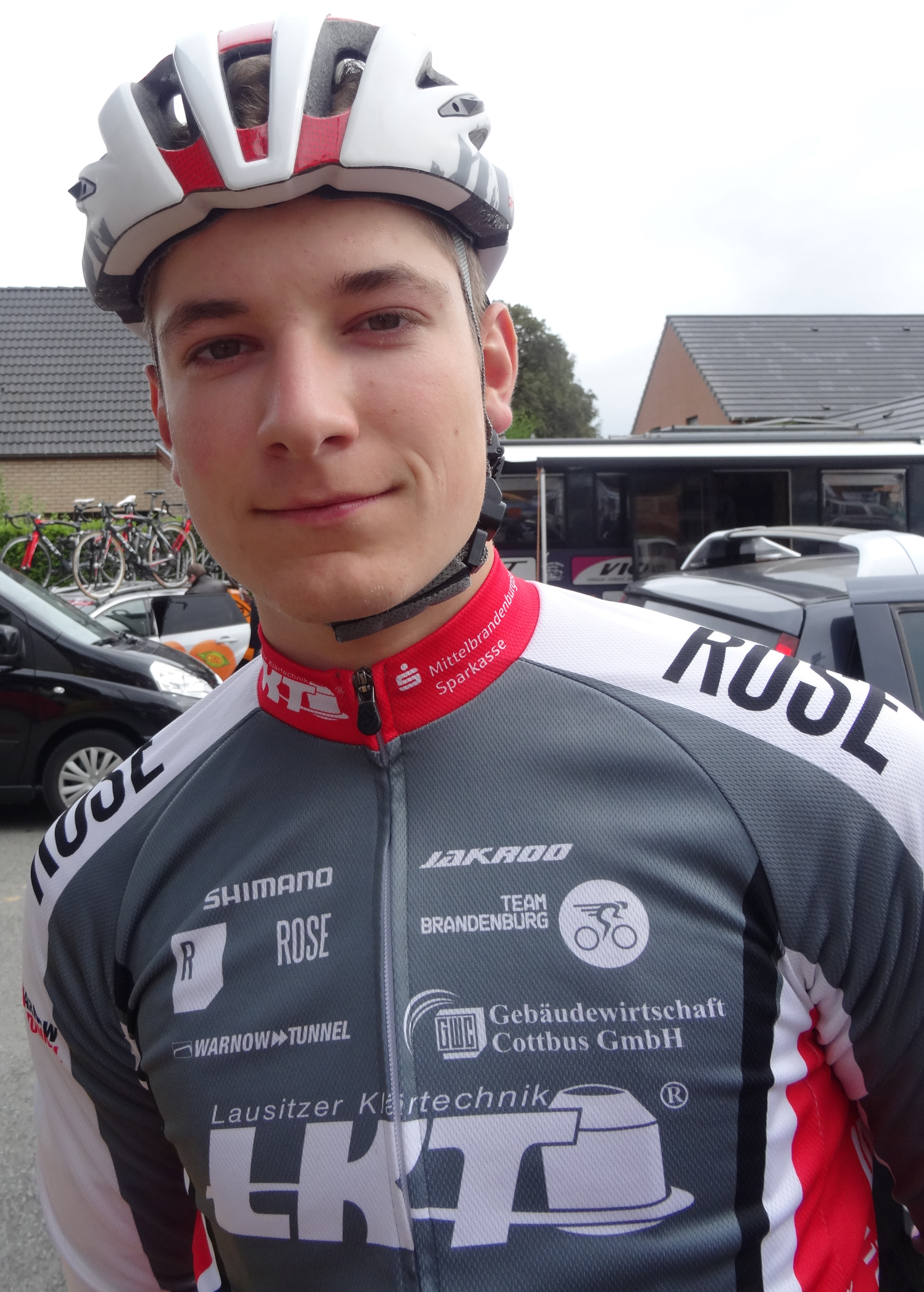
- Willwohl in 2014.

Personal information
- Full name: Willi Willwohl
- Born: 31 August 1994 (age 32) Cottbus
- Height: 1.80 m (5 ft 11 in)
- Weight: 67 kg (148 lb)

Cycling career
- Sport: Cycling
- Current team: Retired
- Discipline: Road
- Role: Rider
- Rider type: Sprinter

Amateur teams
- 2005–2007: BSG Pneumant Fürstenwalde
- 2008–2010: Frankfurter RC 90
- 2011–2012: RSC Cottbus

Professional teams
- 2013–2016: LKT Team Brandenburg
- 2016: Stölting Service Group (stagiaire)

Willi Willwohl (born 31 August 1994 in Cottbus) is a German former cyclist.

== Major results ==
2012
2nd Road race, National Junior Road Championships
4th Overall Tour de la Region de Lodz
6th Overall 3-Etappen-Rundfahrt
2013
Tour de Berlin

1st Stages 3, 4 & 5

1st Stage 6 Dookoła Mazowsza
2014
1st Stage 1 Carpathian Couriers Race
6th Velothon Berlin
7th Rund um Köln
2015
1st Stage 1 Tour du Loir-et-Cher
1st Stage 3 Dookoła Mazowsza
2016
3rd Road race, National Under-23 Road Championships
7th Road race, National Road Championships
