= LKT Team Brandenburg =

German cycling team

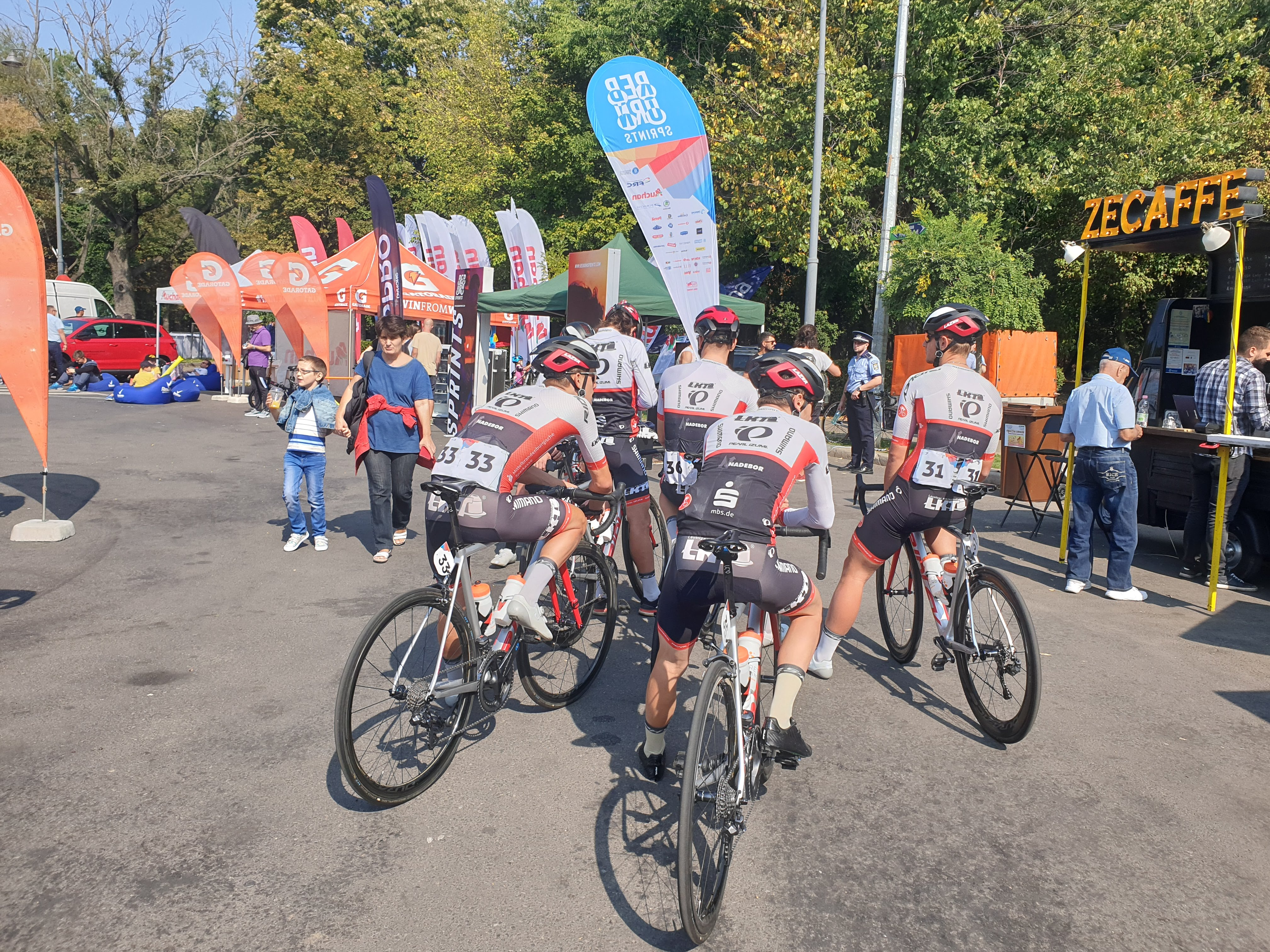
- LKT Team at 2019 Tour of Romania

Team information
- UCI code: LKT
- Registered: Germany
- Founded: 2008
- Discipline: Road
- Status: UCI Continental

Key personnel
- General manager: Michael Müller

Team name history
- 2008–: LKT Team Brandenburg

LKT Team Brandenburg is a German UCI Continental cycling team founded in 2008.

== Team roster ==
As of 12 April 2020.

Rider	Date of birth
Richard Banusch (GER)	7 July 1998 (age 28)
Luca Bockelmann (GER)	17 June 2000 (age 26)
Albert Gathemann (GER)	3 November 2001 (age 24)
Franz Groß (GER)	8 May 2001 (age 25)
Pierre-Pascal Keup (GER)	14 January 2001 (age 25)
Moritz Malcharek (GER)	29 July 1997 (age 29)
Adrian Rips (GER)	15 December 1994 (age 31)

Rider	Date of birth
Paul Rudys (GER)	1 June 1998 (age 28)
Sebastian Schmiedel (GER)	17 February 1997 (age 29)
Paul Taebling (GER)	16 December 1999 (age 26)
Philip Weber (GER)	24 July 1998 (age 28)
Franz Werner (GER)	26 April 2000 (age 26)
Theo Zetzsche (GER)	21 August 2001 (age 25)

== Major wins ==
2013
Stages 3, 4 & 5 Tour de Berlin, Willi Willwohl
Stage 6 Dookoła Mazowsza, Willi Willwohl
2014
Stage 1 Carpathian Couriers Race, Willi Willwohl
Stage 2 Dookoła Mazowsza, Tim Reske
2015
Sprints classification Sibiu Cycling Tour, Robert Kessler
Stage 3 Dookoła Mazowsza, Willi Willwohl
2019
Stage 5 Bałtyk–Karkonosze Tour, Christian Koch

== National champions ==
2017
German U23 Time Trial, Richard Banusch
