= Stölting Service Group (cycling team) =

German cycling team

Team Stölting
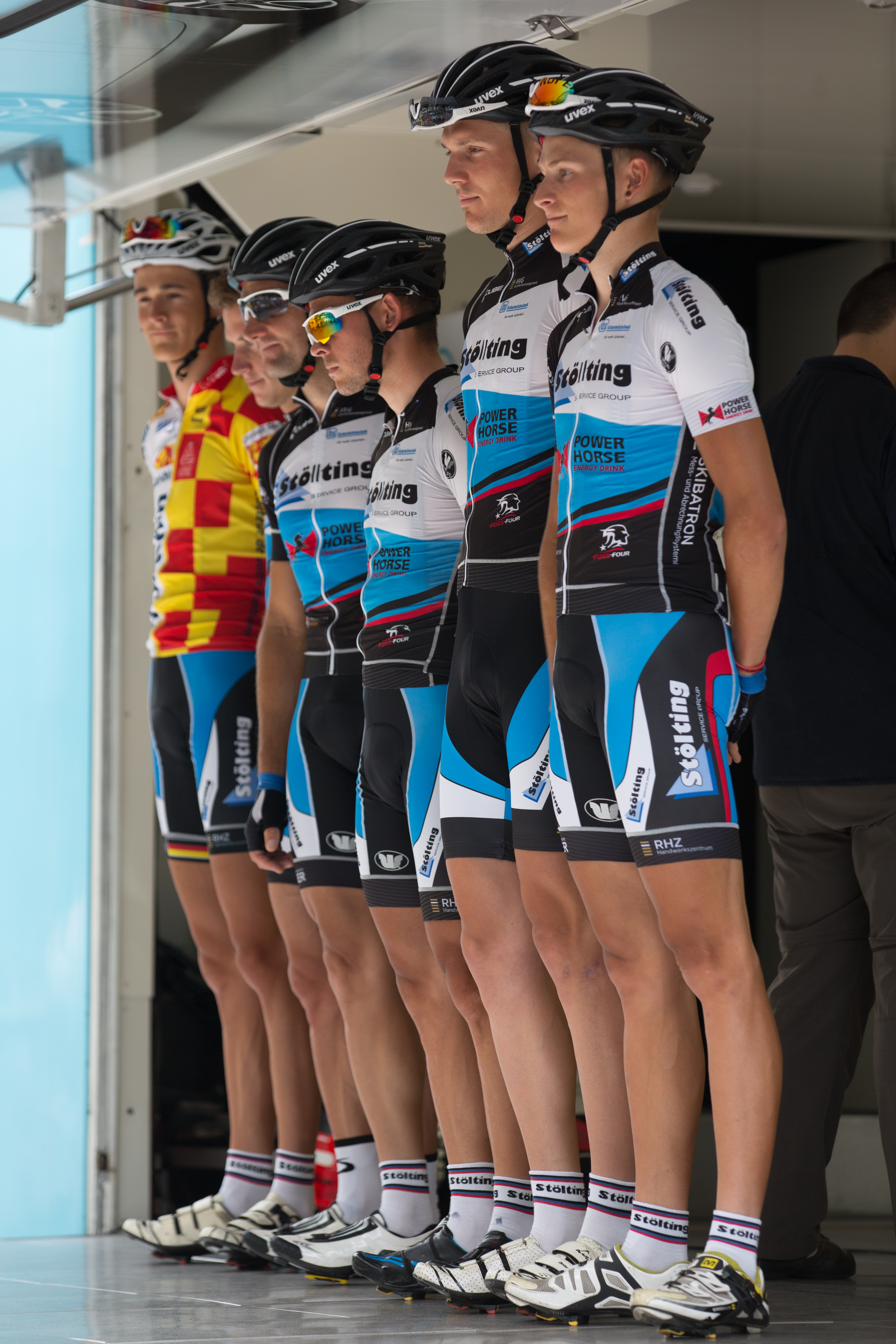

Team information
- Registered: Germany
- Founded: 2011
- Disbanded: 2016
- Discipline: Road
- Status: UCI Professional Continental

Team name history
- 2011 2012 2013–2015 2016: Test Team Raiko-Argon 18; Team Raiko-Stölting; Team Stölting; Stölting Service Group

Team Stölting was a UCI Professional Continental team founded in 2011 and based in Germany. It participates in UCI Continental Circuits races. In December 2016, the team announced they would fold at the end of the month, with principle sponsor Stolting expressing their desire not to drop down to UCI Continental level.

== Roster ==
Roster in 2016:

- Moritz Backofen (GER) (from 1 August, trainee)
- Gerald Ciolek (GER)
- Linus Gerdemann (GER)
- Rasmus Guldhammer (DEN)
- Lasse Norman Hansen (DEN)
- Lennard Kämna (GER)
- Alexander Kamp (DEN)
- Alex Kirsch (LUX)
- Thomas Koep (GER)
- Romain Lemarchand (FRA)
- Christian Mager (GER)
- Mads Pedersen (DEN)
- Rasmus Quaade (DEN)
- Michael Reihs (DEN)
- Sven Reutter (GER)
- Jonas Tenbrock (GER)
- Fabian Wegmann (GER)
- Alexander Weifenbach (GER) (from 1 August, trainee)
- Willi Willwohl (GER) (from 1 August, trainee)

== Major wins ==
2011
Arno Wallaard Memorial, Arne Hassink
2012
Stage 4 Internationale Thüringen-Rundfahrt U23, Jan Dieteren
2013
Prologue Istrian Spring Trophy, Luke Roberts
Germany National Under-23 Road Race Championships, Silvio Herklotz
Stage 2 Internationale Thüringen-Rundfahrt U23, Jan Dieteren
Overall Tour Alsace, Silvio Herklotz

Stage 5, Silvio Herklotz

Stage 1a Tour of Bulgaria, Phil Bauhaus
2014
GP Palio del Recioto, Silvio Herklotz
Skive-Løbet, Max Walscheid
Stages 4 & 5 Tour de Berlin, Max Walscheid
Overall Tour of Małopolska, Maximilian Werda

Stages 2 & 3, Maximilian Werda

Germany National Under-23 Road Race Championships, Max Walscheid
Germany National Under-23 Time Trial Championships, Nils Politt
Stages 1 & 6 Volta a Portugal, Phil Bauhaus
Stage 5 Baltic Chain Tour, Phil Bauhaus
Kernen Omloop Echt-Susteren, Phil Bauhaus
2015
Germany National Under-23 Time Trial Championships, Lennard Kamna
