= 2008 Tour de Hongrie =

Race details
- Dates: 22–26 July
- Stages: 6
- Distance: 834.3 km (518.4 mi)
- Winning time: 20h 29' 22"

Results
Jersey awarded to the overall winner	Winner	Hans Bloks (NED)	(Jo Piels)
	Second	Vladimir Kerkez (SLO)	(Sava Kranj)
	Third	Ivan Stević (SRB)	(Serbia)
Jersey awarded to the points classification winner	Points	Aaron Deckers (NED)	(Rietveld)
Jersey awarded to the mountains classification winner	Mountains	Timo Honstein (GER)	(Atlas Personal)
	Team	Serbia (national team)	

The 2008 Tour de Hongrie was the 35th edition of the Tour de Hongrie cycle race and was held from 22 to 26 July 2008. The race started in Gyomaendrőd and finished in Miskolc. The race was won by Hans Bloks.

== General classification ==
Final general classification

Rank	Rider	Team	Time
1	Hans Bloks (NED)	Jo Piels	20h 29' 22"
2	Vladimir Kerkez (SLO)	Sava Kranj	+ 16"
3	Ivan Stević (SRB)	Serbia	+ 34"
