= Đorđe Đurić =

Đorđe Đurić may refer to:

- Đorđe Đurić (volleyball) (born 1971), Serbian volleyball player
- Đorđe Đurić (footballer) (born 1991), Serbian football player
- Đorđe Đurić (cyclist) (born 2000), Serbian bicycler
