= Serbian National Road Championships =

National road cycling championships in Serbia

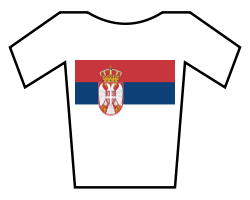

Race details
- Date: June
- Discipline: Road
- Type: One-day race

The Serbian National Road Championships are held annually to decide the cycling champions in both the road race and time trial discipline, across various categories.

== Men ==
=== Road race ===
Year	Winner	Second	Third
2007	Žolt Der	Dragan Spasić	Predrag Prokić
2008	Predrag Prokić	Nebojša Jovanović	Esad Hasanović
2009	Ivan Stević	Esad Hasanović	Nebojša Jovanović
2010	Žolt Der	Goran Smelcerović	Đorde Stevanović
2011	Žolt Der	Esad Hasanović	Nikola Stefanović
2012	Nikola Kozomara	Goran Smelcerović	Đorde Stevanović
2013	Ivan Stević	Marko Danilović	Bojan Djurdjic
2014	Miloš Borisavljević	Ivan Stević	Nebojša Jovanović
2015	Ivan Stević	Miloš Borisavljević	Gabor Kasa
2016	Nikola Kozomara	Nebojša Jovanović	Dejan Maric
2017	Dušan Kalaba	Goran Antonijević	Milan Dragojević
2018	Dušan Rajović	Marko Danilović	Dušan Kalaba
2019	Dušan Rajović	Veljko Stojnić	Marko Danilović
2020	Đorđe Đurić	Stefan Stefanović	Vladimir Vulićević
2021	Dušan Rajović	Stefan Stefanović	Veljko Stojnić
2022	Dušan Rajović	Luka Turkulov	Marko Danilović
2023	Dušan Rajović	Đorđe Đurić	Veljko Stojnić
2024	Ognjen Ilić	Jovan Divnić	Mihajlo Stolić
2025	Veljko Stojnić	Mihajlo Stolić	Jovan Divnić
2026	Veljko Stojnić	Đorđe Đurić	Igor Davidov

=== Time trial ===
Year	Winner	Second	Third
2007	Esad Hasanović	Žolt Der	Goran Smelcerović
2008	Esad Hasanović	Žolt Der	Dragan Spasić
2009	Žolt Der	Esad Hasanović	Dragan Spasić
2010	Esad Hasanović	Nikola Stefanović	Milanko Petrović
2011	Žolt Der	Esad Hasanović	Nikola Stefanović
2012	Ivan Stević	Nikola Kozomara	Esad Hasanović
2013	Esad Hasanović	Gabor Kasa	Miloš Borisavljević
2014	Gabor Kasa	Ivan Stević	Marko Danilović
2015	Gabor Kasa	Miloš Borisavljević	Goran Antonijević
2016	Dušan Rajović	Dušan Kalaba	Stefan Stefanović
2017	Dušan Rajović	Stefan Stefanović	Stevan Klisurić
2018	Veljko Stojnić	Ognjen Ilić	Andrej Galović
2019	Ognjen Ilić	Veljko Stojnić	Stevan Klisurić
2020	Veljko Stojnić	Ognjen Ilić	Dušan Veselinović
2021	Ognjen Ilić	Stevan Klisurić	Dušan Veselinović
2022	Dušan Rajović	Ognjen Ilić	Veljko Stojnić
2023	Ognjen Ilić	Đorđe Đurić	Veljko Stojnić
2024	Dušan Rajović	Ognjen Ilić	Veljko Stojnić

== Women ==
=== Road race ===
Year	Winner	Second	Third
2007	Dragana Kovačević	Vanesa Durman	Zorica Milicevic Antic
2008	Dragana Kovačević	Vanesa Durman	Zorica Milicevic Antic
2009	Jovana Krtinić	Dragana Kovačević	Vanesa Durman
2010	Ivana Miucic	Jovana Krtinić	Tamara Luhovic
2011	Jelena Erić	Jovana Krtinić	Dragana Kovačević
2012	Jovana Crnogorac	Jelena Erić	Dragana Kovačević
2013	Ivana Kostic	Ivana Miucic	-
2014	Jelena Erić	Milica Rakić	Ivana Kostic
2015	Maja Marković	Dragana Kovačević	Slavica Šestic
2016	Jelena Erić	Milica Stevanovic	Maja Savić
2017	Jelena Erić	Jana Jolovic	Ivana Vilim
2018	Jelena Erić	Teodora Savic-Popovic	Jana Jolovic
2019	Jelena Erić	Ivana Vilim	Maja Savić
2020	Ivana Vilim	Maja Hadzi-Ilic	Marijana Urošević
2021	Jelena Erić	Sara Počuča	Marijana Urošević
2022	Jelena Erić	Jana Jolovic	Petra Galijan
2023	Jelena Erić	Bojana Jovanović	Tamara Simanović
2024	Jelena Erić	Iva Pavlović	Bojana Jovanović

=== Time trial ===
Year	Winner	Second	Third
2007	Jovana Krtinić	Vanesa Durman	Dragana Kovačević
2008	Vanesa Durman	Dragana Kovačević	Zorica Milicevic Antic
2009	Jovana Krtinić	Dragana Kovačević	Vanesa Durman
2010	Jovana Krtinić	Ivana Miucic	Tamara Luhovic
2011	Jovana Krtinić	Jovana Crnogorac	Jelena Erić
2012	Jovana Crnogorac	Dragana Kovačević	Valentina Nestorović
2013	Maja Marković	Ivana Kostic	Danijela Posloncec
2014	Jelena Erić	Milica Rakić	Maja Marković
2015	Maja Marković	Slavica Šestic	-
2016	Jelena Erić	Ksenija Bubnjevic	Maja Marković
2017	Jelena Erić	Jovana Crnogorac	Maja Hadzi-Ilic
2018	Jelena Erić	Teodora Savic-Popovic	Ivana Vilim
2019	Jelena Erić	Maja Savić	Ivana Vilim
2020	Ivana Vilim	Marijana Urošević	Valentina Nestorović
2021	Sara Počuča	Marijana Urošević	Ivana Vilim
2022	Aleksandra Sovilj	Marijana Urošević	Agota Ferenc
2023	Jelena Erić	Irina Stevanović	Marijana Urošević
2024	Irina Stevanović	Katarina Marinac	Bojana Jovanović
