= Esad Hasanović =

Serbian cyclist

Personal information
- Born: 24 January 1985 (age 41) Novi Pazar, Serbia

Cycling career
- Sport: Cycling
- Discipline: Road
- Role: Rider

Professional teams
- 2005–2007: Aerospace Engineering Pro Equipe
- 2008–2009: Centri della Calzatura–Partizan
- 2010–2011: Partizan Srbija

Esad Hasanović (born 24 January 1985) is a Serbian cyclist.

== Major results ==
2007
1st National Time Trial Championships
1st Under-23 National Road Race Championships
2008
1st National Time Trial Championships
1st Grand Prix Kooperativa
2009
2nd Trofeo Zsšdi
2nd National Road Race Championships
2nd National Time Trial Championships
6th Tour of Vojvodina I
10th Overall Giro della Regione Friuli Venezia Giulia
2010
1st National Time Trial Championships
1st Grand Prix of Moscow
3rd Overall Tour de Serbie

1st Stage 1

2011
1st National Criterium Championships
2nd National Road Race Championships
2nd National Time Trial Championships
7th Overall Tour of Alanya
9th Overall Tour of Gallipoli
2012
3rd National Time Trial Championships
6th National Road Race Championships
9th Tour of Vojvodina II
2013
1st National Time Trial Championships
2nd Overall Tour of Albania
9th National Road Race Championships
