= Turkish Cycling Federation =

National governing body of cycle racing in Turkey

Turkish Cycling Federation Türkiye Bisiklet Federasyonu
- Abbreviation: TBF
- Formation: 1923
- Type: Government organisation
- Purpose: Sport
- Headquarters: Ulus
- Location: Ankara, Turkey
- Region served: Turkey
- Official language: Turkish
- President: Erol Küçükbakırcı
- Parent organization: GSGM
- Website: bisiklet.gov.tr

The Turkish Cycling Federation (Turkish: Türkiye Bisiklet Federasyonu, TBF) is the national governing body of cycle racing in Turkey. Founded in 1923, its headquarters is located in Ulus quarter of Ankara. Current president of TBF is Emin Müftüoğlu.

The TBF is a member of the UCI and the UEC.

== History ==
The first bicycle competition held in Turkish history was organized by ethnic Armenian Leon effendi and Papazyan in 1910-1912 in the city of Salonica.

Eventually, these Cycling competitions got sponsored by the Fenerbahçe sports club which organized races from the Fenerbahçe neighborhood, then Maslak, and Bakırköy.

The Turkish Cycling Federation was eventually established in 1923. Its first national competition was held in 1927 which started from Taksim and ended in Bulgaria.

== Events ==
The federation organizes following cycling events every year, which are part of UCI Europe Tour and are rated with 2.2:

- Presidential Cycling Tour of Turkey
- Tour of Alanya in Alanya, Antalya Province (since 2010)
- Tour of Cappadocia in Cappadocia, Nevşehir Province (since 2011)
- Tour of Gallipoli in Gallipoli, Çanakkale Province
- Tour of Isparta in Isparta (since 2011)
- Tour of Marmara in Marmara region (since 2010)
- Mersin Road Cycling Race in Mersin (since 2012)
- Tour of Trakya in Tekirdağ, East Thrace (since 2010)
- Tour of Victory, western Turkey

as well as

- Turkish National Road Race Championships
- Turkish National Time Trial Championships

Other events are:

- Adana MTB Cup
- Tour of Mevlana
- Tour of Sivas
- Tour of Trabzon.

== See also ==
- List of naturalized sportspeople of Turkey national cycling teams
