= Nebojša Jovanović =

Serbian racing cyclist

Personal information
- Born: 27 March 1983 (age 43) Belgrade, Yugoslavia

Cycling career
- Sport: Cycling
- Discipline: Road
- Role: Rider

Professional teams
- 2006: AEG Toshiba–Jetnetwork
- 2007–2008: Technal Kastro
- 2009–2010: AC Sparta Praha
- 2011: Partizan–Powermove
- 2014: Kastro Team
- 2015–2016: Kuwait Cycling Project
- 2017–2018: Dare Viator Partizan

Major wins
- National Road Race Championships (2004)

Nebojša Jovanović (Serbian: Небојша Јовановић; born 27 March 1983 in Belgrade) is a Serbian professional road bicycle racer. He was the National Road Race Champion for Serbia and Montenegro in 2004.

He represented Serbia at the 2008 Summer Olympics and finished in 84th place.

== Major results ==
2003
6th Road race, UEC European Under-23 Road Championships
2004
1st Road race, Serbia and Montenegro National Road Championships
3rd Overall Tour de Serbie
2005
3rd Overall Tour of Greece

1st Stage 1

5th Trofeo Alcide Degasperi
2006
10th Overall Tour de Serbie
2007
5th Belgrade–Banja Luka II
5th Grand Prix Kooperativa
2008
2nd Road race, Serbian National Road Championships
2nd Grand Prix Kooperativa
6th Overall Tour de Serbie
7th Overall Tour d'Egypte
8th Tour of Vojvodina I
2009
1st Overall Grand Prix Bradlo
1st Stage 6 Tour de Serbie
3rd Road race, Serbian National Road Championships
9th Overall Tour d'Egypte
2010
3rd Road race, Serbian National Road Championships
9th Coupe des Carpathes
2011
3rd Overall Tour of Alanya
2012
2nd Grand Prix Dobrich I
5th Grand Prix Dobrich II
9th Overall Tour of Greece
2014
3rd Road race, Serbian National Road Championships
10th Overall Sharjah International Cycling Tour
2015
4th UAE Cup
2016
2nd Road race, Serbian National Road Championships
