= Gabor Kasa =

Serbian cyclist

Personal information
- Full name: Gabor Kasa
- Born: 3 February 1989 (age 37): Subotica, SFR Yugoslavia; (now Serbia)

Cycling career
- Sport: Cycling
- Current team: Retired
- Discipline: Road
- Role: Rider

Amateur teams
- 2006–2008: Spartak Subotica
- 2009–2010: World Cycling Centre
- 2013: Melbotech Prorace

Professional teams
- 2011–2012: Manisaspor Cycling Team
- 2014: Kastro Team
- 2015: Nankang–Dynatek

Gabor Kasa (Serbian Cyrillic: Габор Каса; born 3 February 1989 in Subotica) is a Serbian former road bicycle racer. He competed at the 2012 Summer Olympics in the men's road race.

== Major results ==
2007
1st Time trial, National Junior Road Championships
2008
2nd GP Betonexpressz 2000
4th Tour of Vojvodina II
2009
7th Overall Grand Prix Guillaume Tell
10th Overall Coupe des nations Ville Saguenay
2011
1st Overall Tour of Alanya

1st Stage 3

4th Overall Tour de Serbie

1st Stage 2

4th Tour of Vojvodina II
6th Overall Tour of Victory

1st Prologue

6th Tour of Vojvodina I
9th Poreč Trophy
10th Overall Tour of Trakya

1st Stage 2

2012
1st Stage 4 Sibiu Cycling Tour
8th Overall Tour of Trakya
2013
2nd Time trial, National Road Championships
9th Overall Tour de Serbie
9th Central European Tour Miskolc GP
2014
1st Time trial, National Road Championships
10th Overall Tour of Al Zubarah
10th Grand Prix Sarajevo
2015
National Road Championships

1st Time trial
3rd Road race

9th Grand Prix Sarajevo
