= Ivan Stević =

Serbian cyclist

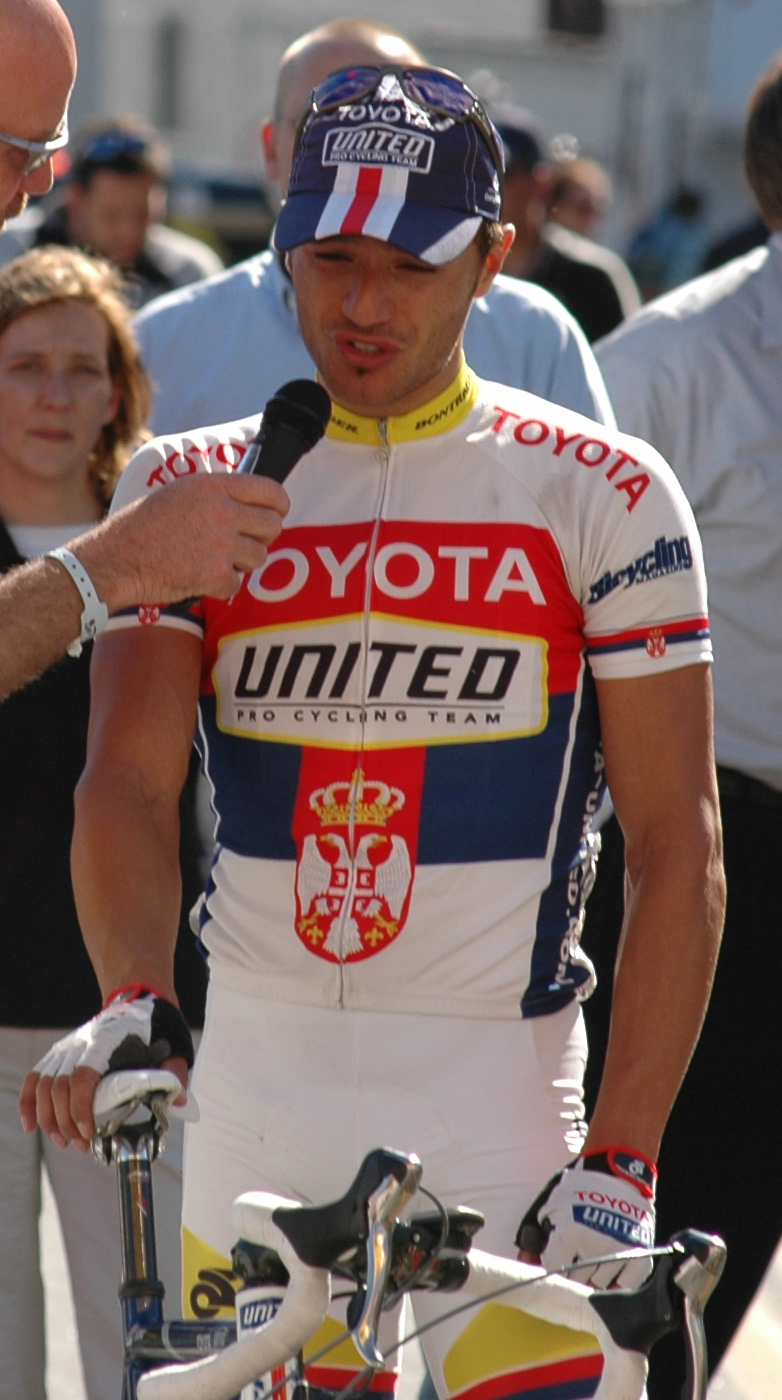
- Stević in 2007

Personal information
- Full name: Ivan Stević; Serbian Cyrillic: Иван Стевић
- Born: 12 March 1980 (age 46): Belgrade, SR Serbia, SFR Yugoslavia; (now Serbia)

Cycling career
- Sport: Cycling
- Current team: Retired
- Discipline: Road
- Role: Rider

Amateur teams
- 2004: Aran World
- 2009: Partizan Beograd
- 2009: Spartak Serbia

Professional teams
- 2005: Aerospace Engineering
- 2006–2008: Toyota–United
- 2010–2011: Partizan Srbija
- 2012: Salcano–Manisaspor
- 2013–2014: Tuşnad Cycling Team
- 2014: Kastro Team
- 2015: Nankang–Dynatek
- 2016: Start–Vaxes Cycling Team

Major wins
- National Road Race Championships (2003, 2005, 2006, 2013, 2015) National Time Trial Championships (2003, 2012)

Ivan Stević (Serbian Cyrillic: Иван Стевић; born 12 March 1980) is a Serbian former professional road bicycle racer. He turned professional in 2005, riding for the Aerospace Engineering-VMG squad, before joining Toyota-United in 2006, the year he won the road race at the Serbian National Road Championships.

== Career ==
Born in Belgrade, Stević rode for the Republic of Serbia and Montenegro at the 2004 Olympics, and for Serbia in the 2008 Olympics in Beijing, having qualified by winning the 'B' World Championships, in South Africa on 1 July 2007. Prior to racing in America, from 2000 to 2005 he rode as an amateur in Italy, amassing 20 Victories for the Aran Cucine-Cantina Tollo and Zilio teams. On 20 July 2010, Stević gave a middle finger salute while winning the fourth stage of the Tour of Qinghai Lake. He was subsequently thrown out of the race for his gesture.

On 22 October 2010, the Union Cycliste Internationale (UCI) disqualified all his results between 17 September 2008 and 16 September 2010 for the use or attempted use of a prohibited substance or method. In 2012, he competed for Serbia at the Olympics in London and took 54th place in the road race.

== Major results ==
2001
Yugoslavian National Road Championships

1st Under-23 road race
2nd Road race

2002
Yugoslavian National Road Championships

1st Under-23 road race
3rd Road race

1st Trofeo Mario Zanchi
2003
Serbia and Montenegro National Road Championships

1st Road race
2nd Time trial

2nd Road race, UCI B World Championships
9th Overall Tour d'Egypte
2004
1st Gran Premio San Basso
1st La Ciociarissima
3rd Trofeo Internazionale Bastianelli
4th Overall Giro Ciclisto delle Provincia di Cosenza

1st Stage 2

9th Gran Premio San Giuseppe
2005
1st Road race, Serbia and Montenegro National Road Championships
1st Overall Tobago International
1st Overall Bermuda GP
1st Stage 4 The Paths of King Nikola
2nd Overall Vuelta de Bisbee

1st Prologue, Stages 1 & 2

2nd Overall Tour of the Gila
4th Overall Sea Otter Classic

1st Stage 1

5th Overall Tour de Serbie

1st Stage 6

6th Road race, Mediterranean Games
8th Reading Classic
9th Lancaster Classic
2006
1st Road race, Serbian National Road Championships
1st Maxxis Georgia Cup
1st Habitat for Humanity Road Race
Tri-Peaks Challenge

1st Stages 1 & 3

1st Stage 5 Nature Valley Grand Prix
2nd Overall Joe Martin Stage Race
2007
1st Road race, UCI B World Championships
1st Overall Nature Valley Grand Prix

1st Stage 1

1st Stage 2 Tour de Georgia
1st Stage 3 Tri-Peaks Challenge
2nd Overall Joe Martin Stage Race
2008
1st Putevima Vukovog Kraja
Tulsa Tough

1st Stages 2 & 3

2nd Overall Tour de Hongrie
3rd Overall Nature Valley Grand Prix

Voided results from 17 September 2008 to 16 September 2010.

2009
~~1st Road race, Balkan Road Championships~~
~~1st Road race, Serbian National Road Championships~~
~~1st Overall Generalni Plasman Liga~~
~~1st Beograd–Čačak~~
~~1st Velika Nagrade Čubure~~
~~5th Overall Tour de Serbie~~
~~6th Overall Grand Prix Bradlo~~
~~10th Overall Grand Prix Cycliste de Gemenc~~
2010
~~1st Velika Nagrada Novog Sad~~
~~1st Beograd–Čačak~~
~~1st Stage 4 Tour of Qinghai Lake~~
~~2nd Overall Generalni Plasman Liga~~
~~5th Memorial Oleg Dyachenko~~
~~7th Grand Prix of Moscow~~

2010
1st Stage 9 Tour of Bulgaria
2011
1st Overall Tour de Serbie
1st Mayor Cup
2nd Overall Five Rings of Moscow
2nd Velika Nagrada Novog Sad
2nd Tour of Vojvodina I
5th Jūrmala Grand Prix
6th Banja Luka–Belgrade II
7th Banja Luka–Belgrade I
10th Grand Prix of Moscow
2012
1st Time trial, Serbian National Road Championships
1st Overall Grand Prix of Sochi

1st Points classification

2nd Overall Five Rings of Moscow

1st Stage 1

3rd Grand Prix of Moscow
7th Mayor Cup
2013
1st Road race, Serbian National Road Championships
1st Overall Tour de Serbie
1st Overall Cupa Mun. Reghin
1st Stage 2 Delta Bike Tour
2nd Road race, Balkan Road Championships
2nd Overall Turul Dobrogei
3rd Overall Tour of Romania
3rd Velika Nagrada Novog Sad
7th Banja Luka–Belgrade I
7th Beograd–Čačak
2014
1st Banja Luka–Belgrade II
Tour de Serbie

1st Points classification
1st Bora Ivkovic Memorial Trophy

Serbian National Road Championships

2nd Road race
2nd Time trial

8th Banja Luka–Belgrade I
8th Grand Prix Sarajevo
2015
1st Road race, Serbian National Road Championships
1st Stage 5 Tour of Bulgaria
3rd Belgrade–Banja Luka II
4th Overall Tour of Çanakkale
4th Overall International Tour of Torku Mevlana

1st Stage 1

4th Krasnodar–Anapa
5th Overall Tour de Serbie
6th Overall Tour of Mersin
6th Overall Tour of Ankara

=== Major championship results ===
Year	2003	2004	2005	2006	2007	2008	2009	2010	2011	2012	2013	2014	2015	2016
UCI World Championships	—	—	—	—	—	—	—	—	DNF	—	DNF	—	DNF	—
UCI B World Championships	2	NH	—	NH	1	Not Held								
Olympic Games	NH	DNF	Not Held			66	Not Held			54	Not Held			DNF
