= Kerkez =

Kerkez is a South Slavic surname. It may refer to:

- Dušan Kerkez (basketball) (born 1952), Serbian basketball player
- Dušan Kerkez (born 1976), Bosnian football manager and former midfielder
- Vladimir Kerkez (born 1984), Slovenian cyclist
- Dejan Kerkez (born 1996), Serbian football centre-back
- Marko Kerkez (born 2000), Serbian football left-back
- Strahinja Kerkez (born 2002), Cypriot football defender
- Milos Kerkez (born 2003), Hungarian football left-back
