= Gašper Švab =

Slovenian cyclist

Personal information
- Full name: Gašper Švab
- Born: 18 July 1986 (age 40) Kranj, Slovenia

Cycling career
- Sport: Cycling
- Current team: Retired
- Discipline: Road
- Role: Rider

Professional team
- 2005–2012: Sava

Gašper Švab (born 18 July 1986 in Kranj) is a Slovenian former cyclist. He rode for the Sava his whole career.

== Major results ==
2007
2nd U23 National Road Race Championships
3rd Overall Giro delle Regioni
3rd Overall Grand Prix du Portugal
2008
1st U23 National Road Race Championships
3rd Overall Gemenc Grand Prix

1st Stage 2

2009
1st GP Kranj
4th Gran Premio San Giuseppe
5th Overall Tour de Slovénie
5th Overall The Paths of King Nikola
2010
8th Overall Tour de Slovénie
