= Alice Towers =

British cyclist

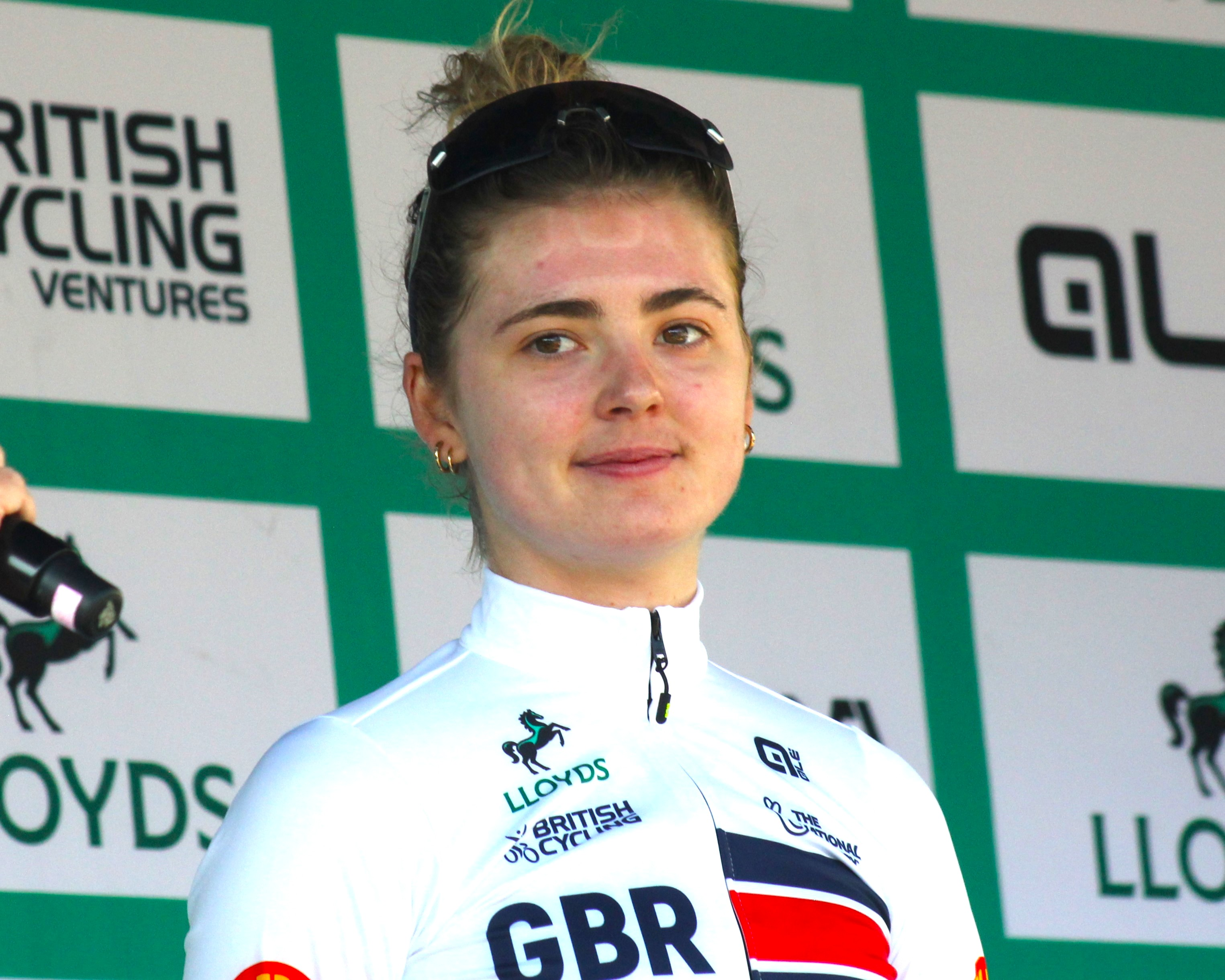
- Towers in 2026

Personal information
- Born: 12 October 2002 (age 24) United Kingdom

Cycling career
- Sport: Cycling
- Current team: EF Education–Oatly
- Discipline: Road
- Role: Rider

Professional teams
- 2021-2022: Le Col–Wahoo
- 2023-2025: Canyon//SRAM
- 2026-: EF Education–Oatly

Major wins
- Single-day races and Classics National Road Race Championships (2022)

Alice Towers (born 12 October 2002) is a British racing cyclist, who currently rides for UCI Women's WorldTour Team EF Education–Oatly.

In 2022, Towers won the British National Road Race Championships.

== Personal life ==
From Derbyshire, her father Jonny Towers was a champion motorcyclist. Her brother Lucas Towers is also a professional road cyclist.

== Major results ==
2019
4th Road race, National Junior Road Championships
2022
1st Road race, National Road Championships
10th Overall Belgium Tour
2023
10th Overall Tour de l'Avenir Femmes
2024
6th Road race, National Road Championships
10th Cadel Evans Great Ocean Road Race
2025
10th Overall Women's Tour Down Under
