= Ognjen Ilić =

Serbian cyclist (born 1998)

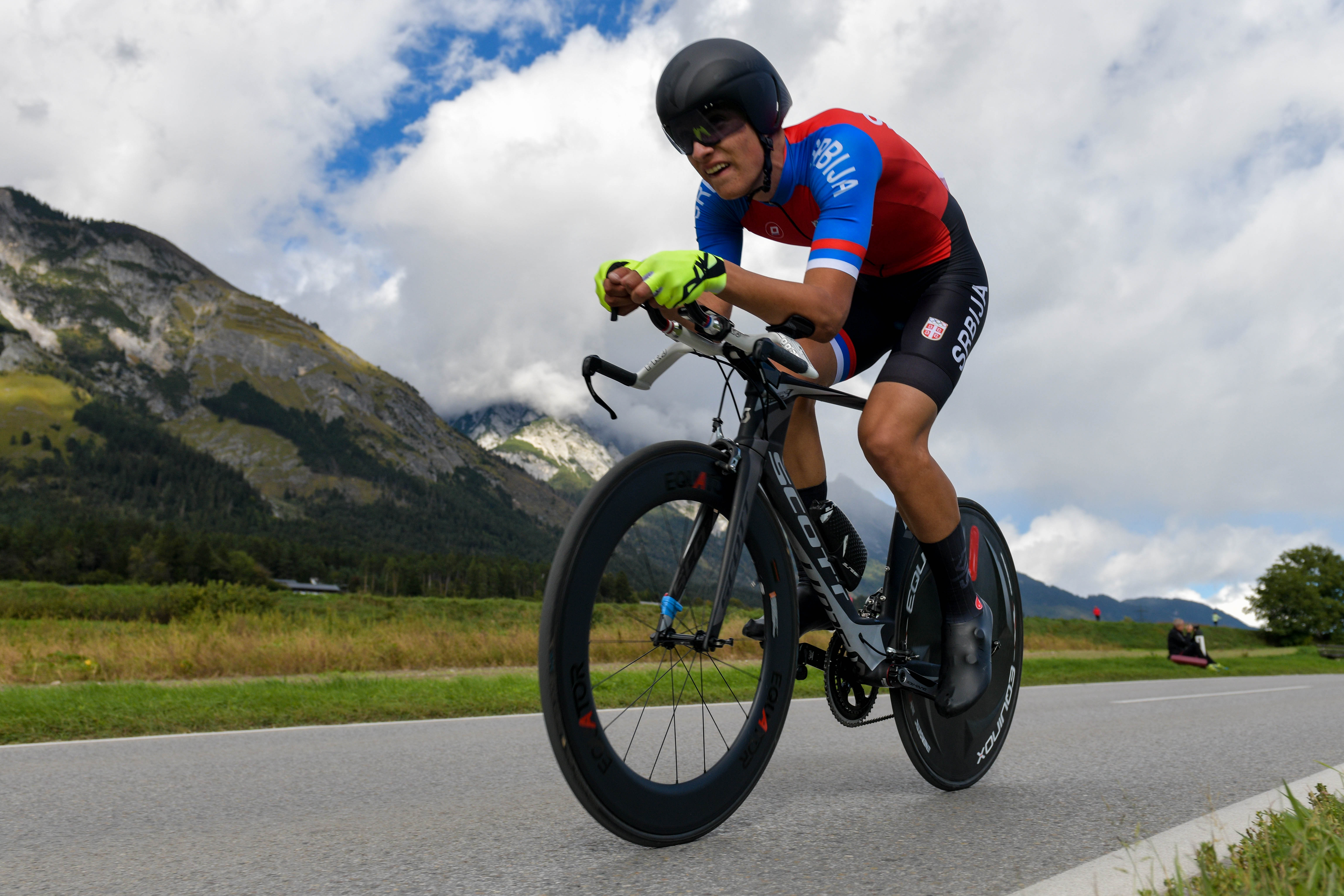
- Ilić at the 2018 UCI Road World Championships

Personal information
- Full name: Ognjen Ilić
- Born: 21 November 1998 (age 27) Aranđelovac, Serbia, FR Yugoslavia
- Height: 1.91 m (6 ft 3 in)
- Weight: 81 kg (179 lb)

Cycling career
- Sport: Cycling
- Discipline: Road
- Role: Rider
- Rider type: Time trialist

Amateur teams
- 2018: Wohnbefinden Graz Arbo
- 2019: WSA KTM Graz

Professional team
- 2017: Dare Viator Partizan
Medal record
Men's road cycling
Representing Serbia
Mediterranean Games
Bronze medal – third place	2022 Oran	Time trial

Ognjen Ilić (born 21 November 1998 in Aranđelovac) is a Serbian cyclist.

== Major results ==
2016
2nd Time trial, National Junior Road Championships
2017
4th Time trial, National Road Championships
2018
2nd Time trial, National Road Championships
2019
1st Time trial, Balkan Road Championships
1st Time trial, National Road Championships
5th Chrono des Nations U23
2020
2nd Time trial, National Road Championships
2021
1st Time trial, National Road Championships
2022
2nd Time trial, National Road Championships
3rd Time trial, Mediterranean Games
2023
1st Time trial, National Road Championships
1st Time trial, Balkan Road Championships
2024
1st Road race, National Road Championships
1st Time trial, Balkan Road Championships
