= Ezra Caudell =

American cyclist

Personal information
- Born: September 6, 2006 (age 20) Acworth, Georgia, United States
- Height: 2.0 m (6 ft 7 in)
- Weight: 82 kg (181 lb)

Cycling career
- Sport: Cycling
- Current team: Modern Adventure Pro Cycling
- Disciplines: Road; Mountain biking
- Role: Rider

Amateur team
- 2025: Team California p/b Verge

Professional team
- 2026–: Modern Adventure Pro Cycling

Ezra Caudell (born September 6, 2006) is an American racing cyclist, who currently rides for UCI ProTeam Modern Adventure Pro Cycling.

Caudell was active in both road cycling and mountain biking as a junior and U23 rider. In 2025, he rode for Team California p/b Verge and won the Campeonato de Navarra. He also finished seventh in the Vuelta a Zamora and fourth in the Vuelta a Segovia. In 2026, he turned professional with the newly formed American squad Modern Adventure Pro Cycling. In the first half of the season, he rode both one-day races in France and Belgium as well as the UAE Tour. As the youngest participant, he finished 121st in Paris–Roubaix. At the National Under-23 Road Championships, he finished fifth in the time trial and fourth in the road race. In the elite road race, he finished seventh.

On August 30, he suffered a heavy crash at the Philadelphia Cycling Classic, hitting a light pole, after which he was hospitalized at Thomas Jefferson University Hospital in critical condition. Caudell was released after 31 days.

== Major results ==
2026
National Under-23 Road Championships

4th Road race
5th Time trial
