= Dušan Kalaba =

Serbian cyclist (born 1996)

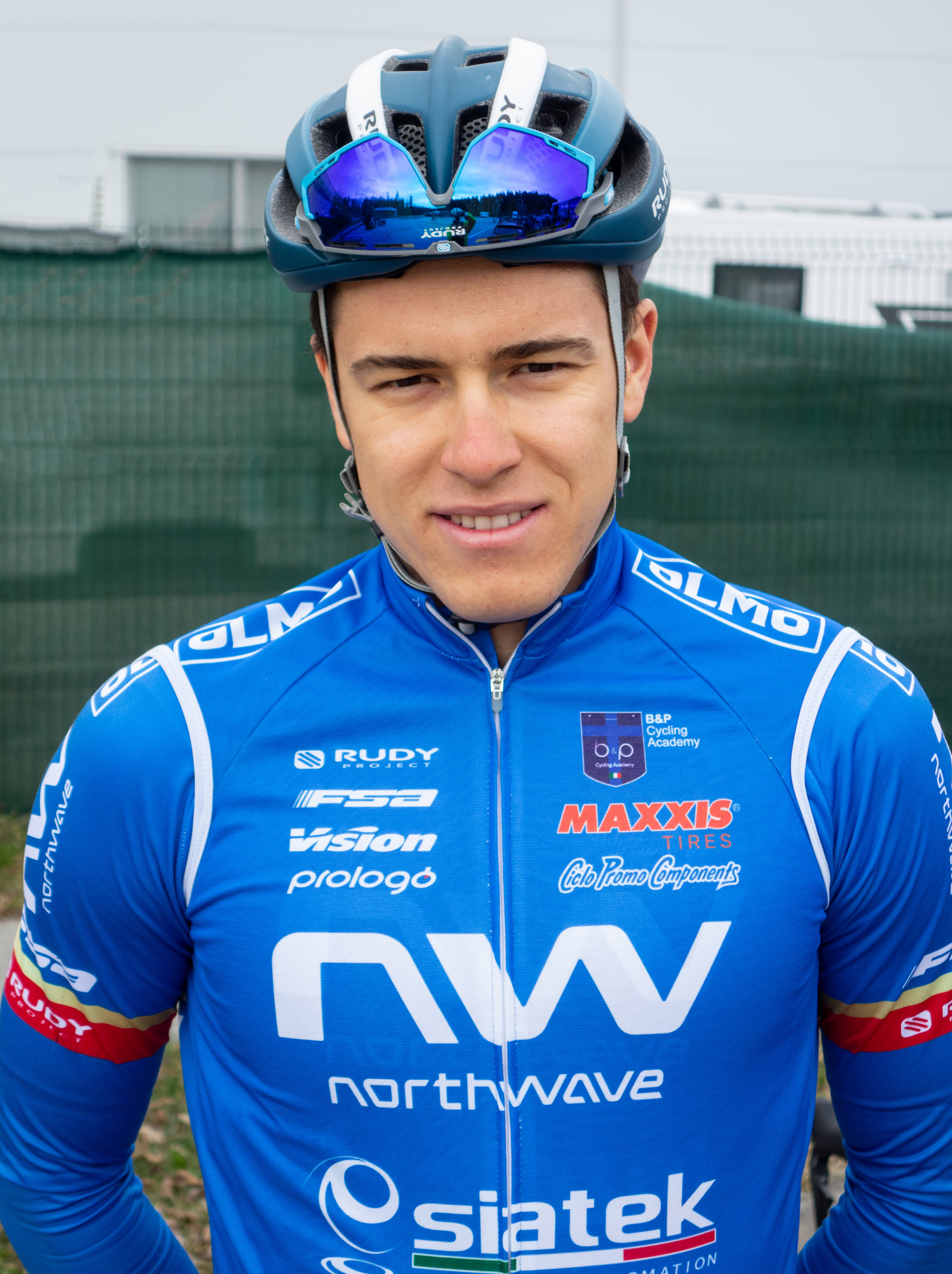
- Kalaba on 2021 GP Adria Mobile

Personal information
- Full name: Dušan Kalaba
- Born: 25 May 1996 (age 30) Beograd, Federal Republic of Yugoslavia
- Height: 1.80 m (5 ft 11 in)
- Weight: 70 kg (154 lb)

Cycling career
- Sport: Cycling
- Discipline: Road
- Role: Rider
- Rider type: sprinter, puncheur

Amateur teams
- 2011—2012: BKS Banja Luka
- 2013—2014: Partizan Beograd
- 2015: Nanking—Dinatek
- 2021: Northwave Siatek Olmo
- 2022: Inviktabike Team—Novi Sad
- 2023: ButcherBox Cycling

Professional teams
- 2016: Start–Vaxes Cycling Team
- 2017: Dare Viator Partizan
- 2019: Ferei Pro Cycling
- 2020—2021: Meridiana–Kamen

Dušan Kalaba (born 25 May 1996) is a Serbian professional road cyclist.

== Major results ==
2013
National Junior Road Championships

2nd Road race
3rd Time trial

2014
3rd Time trial, National Junior Road Championships
4th Overall Belgrade Trophy Milan Panić
2016
2nd Time trial, National Road Championships
10th Umag Trophy
2017
1st Road race, National Road Championships
2nd Overall Tour of Xingtai

1st Points classification
1st Young rider classification

5th Törökbálint GP
2018
3rd Road race, National Road Championships
2019
5th Road race, National Road Championships
2023
1st Overall Hotter'N Hell Hundred

1st Stage 2

2nd Tulsa Tough
2nd Crystal Cup
3rd Littleton Criterium
5th Road race, National Road Championships
