= 2025 UAE Tour =

Emirati cycling race

2025 UCI World Tour, race 3 of 36

Race details
- Dates: 17–23 February 2025
- Stages: 7
- Distance: 1,013.2 km (629.6 mi)
- Winning time: 23h 08' 42"

Results
Jersey awarded to the overall winner	Winner	Tadej Pogačar (SLO)	(UAE Team Emirates XRG)
	Second	Giulio Ciccone (ITA)	(Lidl–Trek)
	Third	Pello Bilbao (ESP)	(Team Bahrain Victorious)
Jersey awarded to the points classification winner	Points	Jonathan Milan (ITA)	(Lidl–Trek)
Jersey awarded to the youth classification winner	Youth	Iván Romeo (ESP)	(Movistar Team)
Jersey awarded to the sprints classification winner	Sprints	Đorđe Đurić (SRB)	(Team Solution Tech–Vini Fantini)
	Team	(Spain) Movistar Team	

The 2025 UAE Tour was a road cycling stage race that took place between 17 and 23 February in the United Arab Emirates. It was the seventh edition of the UAE Tour, and the third race of the 2025 UCI World Tour. The UAE Tour was held over seven stages. The race was won by Slovenian rider Tadej Pogačar of UAE Team Emirates XRG, following stage wins on both mountain stages.

== Teams ==
Fifteen UCI WorldTeams and five UCI ProTeams took part in the race.

=== UCI WorldTeams ===
- Alpecin–Deceuninck
- Decathlon–AG2R La Mondiale
- EF Education–EasyPost
- INEOS Grenadiers
- Intermarché–Wanty
- Lidl–Trek
- Movistar Team
- Red Bull–Bora–Hansgrohe
- Soudal–Quick-Step
- Team Bahrain Victorious
- Team Jayco–AlUla
- Team Picnic–PostNL
- UAE Team Emirates XRG
- Visma–Lease a Bike
- XDS Astana Team

=== UCI ProTeams ===
- Israel–Premier Tech
- Lotto
- Team Solution Tech–Vini Fantini
- Tudor Pro Cycling Team
- VF Group–Bardiani–CSF–Faizanè

== Route ==
Stage characteristics and winners
Stage	Date	Course	Distance	Type	Stage winner
1	17 February	Madinat Zayed Shams Solar Park to Liwa Palace	138 km (86 mi)	Flat stage	Jonathan Milan (ITA)
2	18 February	Al Hudayriat Island to Al Hudayriat Island	12.2 km (7.6 mi)	Individual time trial	Josh Tarling (GBR)
3	19 February	Ras Al Khaimah to Jebel Jais	179 km (111 mi)	Mountain stage	Tadej Pogačar (SLO)
4	20 February	Fujairah Qidfa Beach to Umm Al Quwain	181 km (112 mi)	Flat stage	Jonathan Milan (ITA)
5	21 February	American University Dubai to Hamdan Bin Mohammed Smart University	160 km (99 mi)	Flat stage	Tim Merlier (BEL)
6	22 February	Abu Dhabi Cycling Club to Abu Dhabi Breakwater	167 km (104 mi)	Flat stage	Tim Merlier (BEL)
7	23 February	Al Ain Hazza bin Zayed Stadium to Jebel Hafeet	176 km (109 mi)	Mountain stage	Tadej Pogačar (SLO)
Total			1,013.2 km (629.6 mi)		

== Stages ==
=== Stage 1 ===
17 February 2025 — Madinat Zayed Shams Solar Park to Liwa Palace, 138 km (86 mi)

Stage 1 Result
Rank	Rider	Team	Time
1	Jonathan Milan (ITA)	Lidl–Trek	3h 31' 34"
2	Finn Fisher-Black (NZL)	Red Bull–Bora–Hansgrohe	+ 0"
3	Tobias Lund Andresen (DEN)	Team Picnic–PostNL	+ 0"
4	Lennert Van Eetvelt (BEL)	Lotto	+ 0"
5	Oscar Onley (GBR)	Team Picnic–PostNL	+ 0"
6	Aaron Gate (NZL)	XDS Astana Team	+ 0"
7	Harold Tejada (COL)	XDS Astana Team	+ 0"
8	Lionel Taminiaux (BEL)	Lotto	+ 0"
9	Phil Bauhaus (GER)	Team Bahrain Victorious	+ 0"
10	Tadej Pogačar (SLO)	UAE Team Emirates XRG	+ 0"

General classification after Stage 1
Rank	Rider	Team	Time
1	Jonathan Milan (ITA)	Lidl–Trek	3h 31' 24"
2	Finn Fisher-Black (NZL)	Red Bull–Bora–Hansgrohe	+ 4"
3	Tobias Lund Andresen (DEN)	Team Picnic–PostNL	+ 6"
4	Lennert Van Eetvelt (BEL)	Lotto	+ 10"
5	Oscar Onley (GBR)	Team Picnic–PostNL	+ 10"
6	Aaron Gate (NZL)	XDS Astana Team	+ 10"
7	Harold Tejada (COL)	XDS Astana Team	+ 10"
8	Lionel Taminiaux (BEL)	Lotto	+ 10"
9	Phil Bauhaus (GER)	Team Bahrain Victorious	+ 10"
10	Tadej Pogačar (SLO)	UAE Team Emirates XRG	+ 10"

=== Stage 2 ===
18 February 2025 – Al Hudayriat Island to Al Hudayriat Island, 12.2 km (7.6 mi) (ITT)

Stage 2 Result
Rank	Rider	Team	Time
1	Joshua Tarling (GBR)	INEOS Grenadiers	12' 55"
2	Stefan Bissegger (SUI)	Decathlon–AG2R La Mondiale	+ 13"
3	Tadej Pogačar (SLO)	UAE Team Emirates XRG	+ 18"
4	Jay Vine (AUS)	UAE Team Emirates XRG	+ 21"
5	Max Walscheid (GER)	Team Jayco–AlUla	+ 24"
6	Pablo Castrillo (ESP)	Movistar Team	+ 27"
7	Iván Romeo (ESP)	Movistar Team	+ 28"
8	Pello Bilbao (ESP)	Team Bahrain Victorious	+ 39"
9	Florian Vermeersch (BEL)	UAE Team Emirates XRG	+ 39"
10	Finn Fisher-Black (NZL)	Red Bull–Bora–Hansgrohe	+ 40"

General classification after Stage 2
Rank	Rider	Team	Time
1	Joshua Tarling (GBR)	INEOS Grenadiers	3h 44' 29"
2	Stefan Bissegger (SUI)	Decathlon–AG2R La Mondiale	+ 13"
3	Tadej Pogačar (SLO)	UAE Team Emirates XRG	+ 18"
4	Jay Vine (AUS)	UAE Team Emirates XRG	+ 21"
5	Pablo Castrillo (ESP)	Movistar Team	+ 27"
6	Iván Romeo (ESP)	Movistar Team	+ 28"
7	Finn Fisher-Black (NZL)	Red Bull–Bora–Hansgrohe	+ 34"
8	Pello Bilbao (ESP)	Team Bahrain Victorious	+ 39"
9	Bruno Armirail (FRA)	Decathlon–AG2R La Mondiale	+ 41"
10	Harold Tejada (COL)	XDS Astana Team	+ 42"

=== Stage 3 ===
19 February 2025 – Ras Al Khaimah to Jebel Jais, 179 km (111 mi)

Stage 3 Result
Rank	Rider	Team	Time
1	Tadej Pogačar (SLO)	UAE Team Emirates XRG	4h 36' 04"
2	Oscar Onley (GBR)	Team Picnic–PostNL	+ 0"
3	Felix Gall (AUT)	Decathlon–AG2R La Mondiale	+ 0"
4	Lennert Van Eetvelt (BEL)	Lotto	+ 0"
5	Giulio Ciccone (ITA)	Lidl–Trek	+ 0"
6	Finn Fisher-Black (NZL)	Red Bull–Bora–Hansgrohe	+ 0"
7	Iván Romeo (ESP)	Movistar Team	+ 4"
8	Pablo Castrillo (ESP)	Movistar Team	+ 4"
9	Matthew Riccitello (USA)	Israel–Premier Tech	+ 4"
10	Paul Seixas (FRA)	Decathlon–AG2R La Mondiale	+ 4"

General classification after Stage 3
Rank	Rider	Team	Time
1	Tadej Pogačar (SLO)	UAE Team Emirates XRG	8h 20' 41"
2	Joshua Tarling (GBR)	INEOS Grenadiers	+ 18"
3	Pablo Castrillo (ESP)	Movistar Team	+ 23"
4	Iván Romeo (ESP)	Movistar Team	+ 24"
5	Finn Fisher-Black (NZL)	Red Bull–Bora–Hansgrohe	+ 26"
6	Jay Vine (AUS)	UAE Team Emirates XRG	+ 33"
7	Giulio Ciccone (ITA)	Lidl–Trek	+ 34"
8	Pello Bilbao (ESP)	Team Bahrain Victorious	+ 35"
9	Harold Tejada (COL)	XDS Astana Team	+ 38"
10	Lennert Van Eetvelt (BEL)	Lotto	+ 38"

=== Stage 4 ===
20 February 2025 – Fujairah Qidfa Beach to Umm Al Quwain, 181 km (112 mi)

Stage 4 Result
Rank	Rider	Team	Time
1	Jonathan Milan (ITA)	Lidl–Trek	4h 03' 01"
2	Tim Merlier (BEL)	Soudal–Quick-Step	+ 0"
3	Jasper Philipsen (BEL)	Alpecin–Deceuninck	+ 0"
4	Daniel McLay (GBR)	Visma–Lease a Bike	+ 0"
5	Fernando Gaviria (COL)	Movistar Team	+ 0"
6	Fabio Jakobsen (NED)	Team Picnic–PostNL	+ 0"
7	Dylan Groenewegen (NED)	Team Jayco–AlUla	+ 0"
8	Phil Bauhaus (GER)	Team Bahrain Victorious	+ 0"
9	Steffen De Schuyteneer (BEL)	Lotto	+ 0"
10	Gerben Thijssen (BEL)	Intermarché–Wanty	+ 0"

General classification after Stage 4
Rank	Rider	Team	Time
1	Tadej Pogačar (SLO)	UAE Team Emirates XRG	12h 23' 42"
2	Joshua Tarling (GBR)	INEOS Grenadiers	+ 18"
3	Pablo Castrillo (ESP)	Movistar Team	+ 23"
4	Iván Romeo (ESP)	Movistar Team	+ 24"
5	Finn Fisher-Black (NZL)	Red Bull–Bora–Hansgrohe	+ 25"
6	Jay Vine (AUS)	UAE Team Emirates XRG	+ 33"
7	Giulio Ciccone (ITA)	Lidl–Trek	+ 34"
8	Pello Bilbao (ESP)	Team Bahrain Victorious	+ 35"
9	Harold Tejada (COL)	XDS Astana Team	+ 38"
10	Lennert Van Eetvelt (BEL)	Lotto	+ 38"

=== Stage 5 ===
21 February 2025 – American University Dubai to Hamdan Bin Mohammed Smart University, 160 km (99 mi)

Stage 5 Result
Rank	Rider	Team	Time
1	Tim Merlier (BEL)	Soudal–Quick-Step	3h 16' 55"
2	Matteo Malucelli (ITA)	XDS Astana Team	+ 0"
3	Jonathan Milan (ITA)	Lidl–Trek	+ 0"
4	Sam Welsford (AUS)	Red Bull–Bora–Hansgrohe	+ 0"
5	Oded Kogut (ISR)	Israel–Premier Tech	+ 0"
6	Maikel Zijlaard (NED)	Tudor Pro Cycling Team	+ 0"
7	Danny van Poppel (NED)	Red Bull–Bora–Hansgrohe	+ 0"
8	Phil Bauhaus (GER)	Team Bahrain Victorious	+ 0"
9	Elmar Reinders (NED)	Team Jayco–AlUla	+ 0"
10	Luka Mezgec (SLO)	Team Jayco–AlUla	+ 0"

General classification after Stage 5
Rank	Rider	Team	Time
1	Tadej Pogačar (SLO)	UAE Team Emirates XRG	15h 40' 34"
2	Joshua Tarling (GBR)	INEOS Grenadiers	+ 21"
3	Iván Romeo (ESP)	Movistar Team	+ 27"
4	Finn Fisher-Black (NZL)	Red Bull–Bora–Hansgrohe	+ 28"
5	Jay Vine (AUS)	UAE Team Emirates XRG	+ 36"
6	Giulio Ciccone (ITA)	Lidl–Trek	+ 37"
7	Pello Bilbao (ESP)	Team Bahrain Victorious	+ 38"
8	Lennert Van Eetvelt (BEL)	Lotto	+ 38"
9	Harold Tejada (COL)	XDS Astana Team	+ 41"
10	Oscar Onley (GBR)	Team Picnic–PostNL	+ 44"

=== Stage 6 ===
22 February 2025 – Abu Dhabi Cycling Club to Abu Dhabi Breakwater, 167 km (104 mi)

Stage 6 Result
Rank	Rider	Team	Time
1	Tim Merlier (BEL)	Soudal–Quick-Step	3h 44' 14"
2	Jasper Philipsen (BEL)	Alpecin–Deceuninck	+ 0"
3	Jonathan Milan (ITA)	Lidl–Trek	+ 0"
4	Max Walscheid (GER)	Team Jayco–AlUla	+ 0"
5	Fabio Jakobsen (NED)	Team Picnic–PostNL	+ 0"
6	Dušan Rajović (SRB)	Team Solution Tech–Vini Fantini	+ 0"
7	Daniel Skerl (ITA)	Team Bahrain Victorious	+ 0"
8	Enrico Zanoncello (ITA)	VF Group–Bardiani–CSF–Faizanè	+ 0"
9	Sam Welsford (AUS)	Red Bull–Bora–Hansgrohe	+ 0"
10	Steffen De Schuyteneer (BEL)	Lotto	+ 0"

General classification after Stage 6
Rank	Rider	Team	Time
1	Tadej Pogačar (SLO)	UAE Team Emirates XRG	19h 24' 48"
2	Joshua Tarling (GBR)	INEOS Grenadiers	+ 21"
3	Iván Romeo (ESP)	Movistar Team	+ 27"
4	Finn Fisher-Black (NZL)	Red Bull–Bora–Hansgrohe	+ 28"
5	Jay Vine (AUS)	UAE Team Emirates XRG	+ 36"
6	Giulio Ciccone (ITA)	Lidl–Trek	+ 37"
7	Pello Bilbao (ESP)	Team Bahrain Victorious	+ 38"
8	Lennert Van Eetvelt (BEL)	Lotto	+ 38"
9	Harold Tejada (COL)	XDS Astana Team	+ 41"
10	Oscar Onley (GBR)	Team Picnic–PostNL	+ 44"

=== Stage 7 ===
23 February 2025 – Al Ain Hazza bin Zayed Stadium to Jebel Hafeet, 176 km (109 mi)

Stage 7 Result
Rank	Rider	Team	Time
1	Tadej Pogačar (SLO)	UAE Team Emirates XRG	3h 44' 04"
2	Giulio Ciccone (ITA)	Lidl–Trek	+ 33"
3	Pello Bilbao (ESP)	Team Bahrain Victorious	+ 35"
4	Iván Romeo (ESP)	Movistar Team	+ 49"
5	Oscar Onley (GBR)	Team Picnic–PostNL	+ 1' 16"
6	Pablo Castrillo (ESP)	Movistar Team	+ 1' 25"
7	Finn Fisher-Black (NZL)	Red Bull–Bora–Hansgrohe	+ 2' 05"
8	William Junior Lecerf (BEL)	Soudal–Quick-Step	+ 2' 11"
9	Patrick Konrad (AUT)	Lidl–Trek	+ 2' 33"
10	Ramses Debruyne (BEL)	Alpecin–Deceuninck	+ 2' 51"

General classification after Stage 7
Rank	Rider	Team	Time
1	Tadej Pogačar (SLO)	UAE Team Emirates XRG	23h 08' 42"
2	Giulio Ciccone (ITA)	Lidl–Trek	+ 1' 14"
3	Pello Bilbao (ESP)	Team Bahrain Victorious	+ 1' 19"
4	Iván Romeo (ESP)	Movistar Team	+ 1' 26"
5	Oscar Onley (GBR)	Team Picnic–PostNL	+ 2' 10"
6	Finn Fisher-Black (NZL)	Red Bull–Bora–Hansgrohe	+ 2' 43"
7	Pablo Castrillo (ESP)	Movistar Team	+ 2' 59"
8	William Junior Lecerf (BEL)	Soudal–Quick-Step	+ 3' 49"
9	Harold Tejada (COL)	XDS Astana Team	+ 3' 52"
10	Patrick Konrad (AUT)	Lidl–Trek	+ 4' 00"

== Classification leadership table ==
Classification leadership by stage
Stage	Winner	General classification	Points classification	Sprints classification	Young rider classification	Team classification
1	Jonathan Milan	Jonathan Milan	Jonathan Milan	Manuele Tarozzi	Jonathan Milan	Red Bull–Bora–Hansgrohe
2	Josh Tarling	Josh Tarling	Josh Tarling	Manuele Tarozzi	Josh Tarling	INEOS Grenadiers
3	Tadej Pogačar	Tadej Pogačar	Tadej Pogačar	Carlos Samudio	Josh Tarling	INEOS Grenadiers
4	Jonathan Milan	Tadej Pogačar	Jonathan Milan	Đorđe Đurić	Josh Tarling	INEOS Grenadiers
5	Tim Merlier	Tadej Pogačar	Jonathan Milan	Đorđe Đurić	Josh Tarling	Movistar Team
6	Tim Merlier	Tadej Pogačar	Jonathan Milan	Đorđe Đurić	Josh Tarling	Movistar Team
7	Tadej Pogačar	Tadej Pogačar	Jonathan Milan	Đorđe Đurić	Iván Romeo	Movistar Team
Final		Tadej Pogačar	Jonathan Milan	Đorđe Đurić	Iván Romeo	Movistar Team

== Final classification standings ==
Legend
Denotes the winner of the general classification	Denotes the winner of the sprints classification
Denotes the winner of the points classification	Denotes the winner of the young rider classification

=== General classification ===
Final general classification (1–10)
Rank	Rider	Team	Time
1	Tadej Pogačar (SLO)	UAE Team Emirates XRG	23h 08' 42"
2	Giulio Ciccone (ITA)	Lidl–Trek	+ 1' 14"
3	Pello Bilbao (ESP)	Team Bahrain Victorious	+ 1' 19"
4	Iván Romeo (ESP)	Movistar Team	+ 1' 26"
5	Oscar Onley (GBR)	Team Picnic–PostNL	+ 2' 10"
6	Finn Fisher-Black (NZL)	Red Bull–Bora–Hansgrohe	+ 2' 43"
7	Pablo Castrillo (ESP)	Movistar Team	+ 2' 59"
8	William Junior Lecerf (BEL)	Soudal–Quick-Step	+ 3' 49"
9	Harold Tejada (COL)	XDS Astana Team	+ 3' 52"
10	Patrick Konrad (AUT)	Lidl–Trek	+ 4' 00"

=== Points classification ===
Final points classification (1–10)
Rank	Rider	Team	Time
1	Jonathan Milan (ITA)	Lidl–Trek	81
2	Tadej Pogačar (SLO)	UAE Team Emirates XRG	62
3	Tim Merlier (BEL)	Soudal–Quick-Step	59
4	Đorđe Đurić (SRB)	Team Solution Tech–Vini Fantini	46
5	Carlos Samudio (PAN)	Team Solution Tech–Vini Fantini	38
6	Manuele Tarozzi (ITA)	VF Group–Bardiani–CSF–Faizanè	33
7	Oscar Onley (GBR)	Team Picnic–PostNL	30
8	Finn Fisher-Black (NZL)	Red Bull–Bora–Hansgrohe	29
9	Lennert Van Eetvelt (BEL)	Lotto	26
10	Giulio Ciccone (ITA)	Lidl–Trek	23

=== Sprints classification ===
Final sprints classification (1–10)
Rank	Rider	Team	Time
1	Đorđe Đurić (SRB)	Team Solution Tech–Vini Fantini	46
2	Carlos Samudio (PAN)	Team Solution Tech–Vini Fantini	38
3	Manuele Tarozzi (ITA)	VF Group–Bardiani–CSF–Faizanè	33
4	Jonathan Milan (ITA)	Lidl–Trek	17
5	Tadej Pogačar (SLO)	UAE Team Emirates XRG	9
6	Lennert Van Eetvelt (BEL)	Lotto	8
7	Lorenzo Quartucci (ITA)	Team Solution Tech–Vini Fantini	5
8	Robbe Ghys (BEL)	Alpecin–Deceuninck	5
9	Michael Leonard (CAN)	INEOS Grenadiers	5
10	Finn Fisher-Black (NZL)	Red Bull–Bora–Hansgrohe	3

=== Young rider classification ===
Final young rider classification (1–10)
Rank	Rider	Team	Time
1	Iván Romeo (ESP)	Movistar Team	23h 10' 08"
2	Oscar Onley (GBR)	Team Picnic–PostNL	+ 44"
3	Finn Fisher-Black (NZL)	Red Bull–Bora–Hansgrohe	+ 1' 17"
4	Pablo Castrillo (ESP)	Movistar Team	+ 1' 33"
5	William Junior Lecerf (BEL)	Soudal–Quick-Step	+ 2' 23"
6	Lennert Van Eetvelt (BEL)	Lotto	+ 3' 17"
7	Georg Steinhauser (GER)	EF Education–EasyPost	+ 3' 35"
8	Matthew Riccitello (USA)	Israel–Premier Tech	+ 4' 55"
9	Alessandro Pinarello (ITA)	VF Group–Bardiani–CSF–Faizanè	+ 5' 55"
10	Joshua Tarling (GBR)	INEOS Grenadiers	+ 6' 54"

=== Teams classification ===
Final team classification (1–10)
Rank	Team	Time
1	(Spain) Movistar Team	69h 35' 16"
2	(United States) Lidl–Trek	+ 6' 03"
3	Team Bahrain Victorious	+ 7' 51"
4	(Germany) Red Bull–Bora–Hansgrohe	+ 9' 43"
5	(France) Decathlon–AG2R La Mondiale	+ 10' 38"
6	(United Arab Emirates) UAE Team Emirates XRG	+ 12' 18"
7	(United States) EF Education–EasyPost	+ 19' 29"
8	Israel–Premier Tech	+ 20' 02"
9	(Kazakhstan) XDS Astana Team	+ 22' 54"
10	(United Kingdom) INEOS Grenadiers	+ 25' 45"
