= Adana MTB Cup =

Mountain biking race held in Turkey

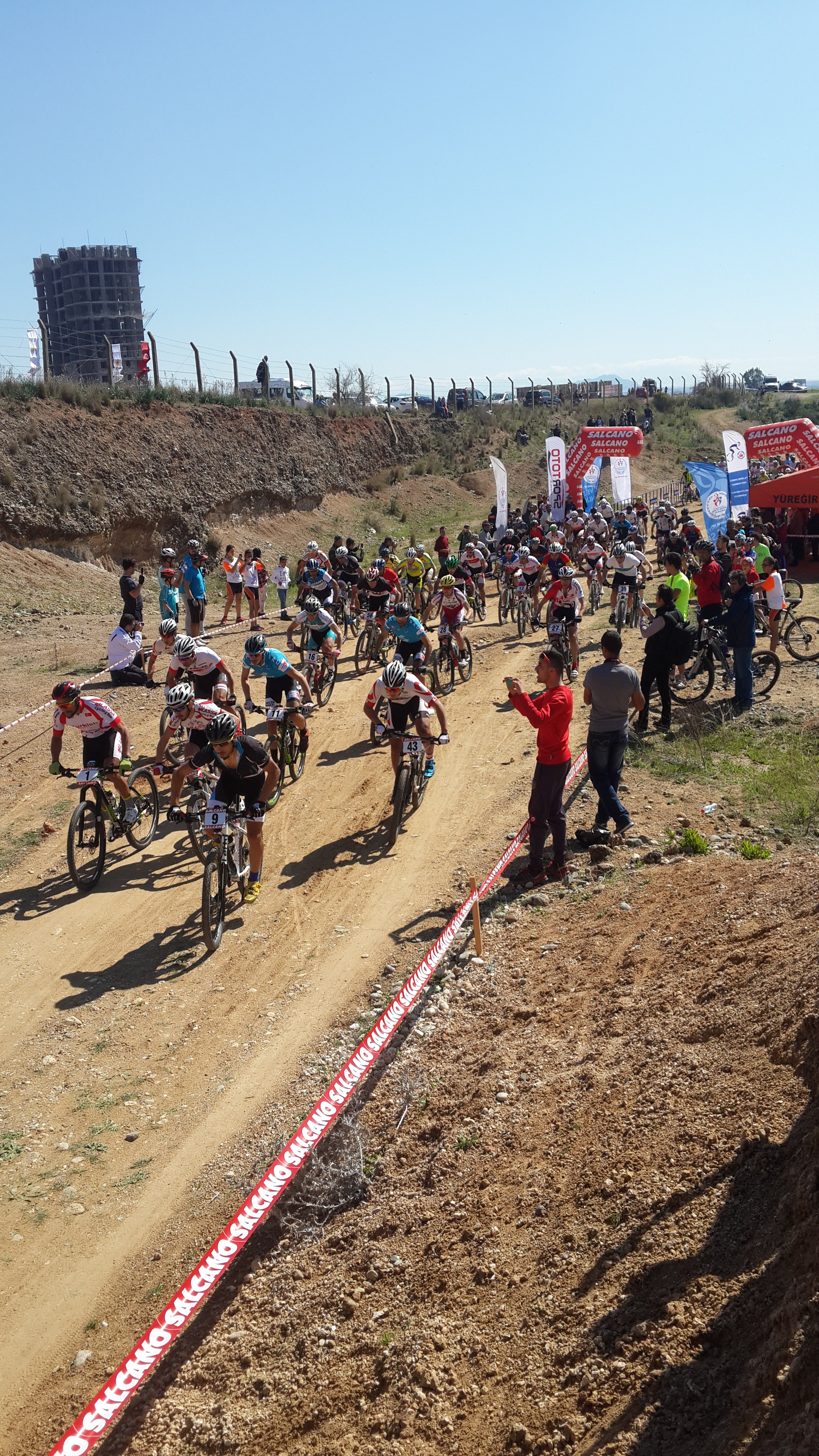

Race details
- Date: March
- Region: Adana, Turkey
- Local name: Uluslararası Adana Dağ Bisikleti Yarışı
- Discipline: Cross-country cycling
- Competition: Olympic (XCO)
- Type: Stage race
- Organiser: Turkish Cycling Federation

History
- First edition: 2010
- First winner: Abdülkadir Kelleci (TUR)
- Most recent: Abdülkadir Kelleci (TUR)

Adana MTB Cup

The Adana MTB Cup (Turkish: Uluslararası Adana Dağ Bisikleti Yarışı) is an international mountain biking race annually held in Adana since 2010. It is a class 2, Cross-country olympic (XCO) race performed in 4 different categories; Men elite, Women elite, men junior, women junior.

Adana MTB Cup is the first leg of the XCO discipline UCI racing season in Turkey. The race is held every year in the first half of March and it is organised by the Turkish Cycling Federation.

== Winners ==
Year	Country	Rider	Team
2010	Turkey	Abdülkadir Kelleci	Brisaspor Turkey
2016	Turkey	Abdülkadir Kelleci	Brisaspor Turkey

== Adana MTB Cup 2016 ==
Adana MTB Cup 2016 is held on March 6 at the 80.Yıl Woods in Balcalı neighbourhood. Other than the 4 UCI categories, there were races in 5 more categories. Total of 174 cyclists joined races in 9 categories.
