= Maja Savić (cyclist) =

Serbian cyclist

Personal information
- Born: 27 July 1994 (age 32)

Cycling career
- Sport: Cycling
- Discipline: Road
- Role: Rider

Professional team
- 2019: BTC City Ljubljana

Maja Savić (born 27 July 1994) is a Serbian professional racing cyclist. She rode for the UCI Women's Team BTC City Ljubljana during the 2019 women's road cycling season. She has twice finished third in the road race at the Serbian National Road Championships and was runner-up in the time trial at the 2019 championships.
