= Luka Turkulov =

Serbian road cyclist

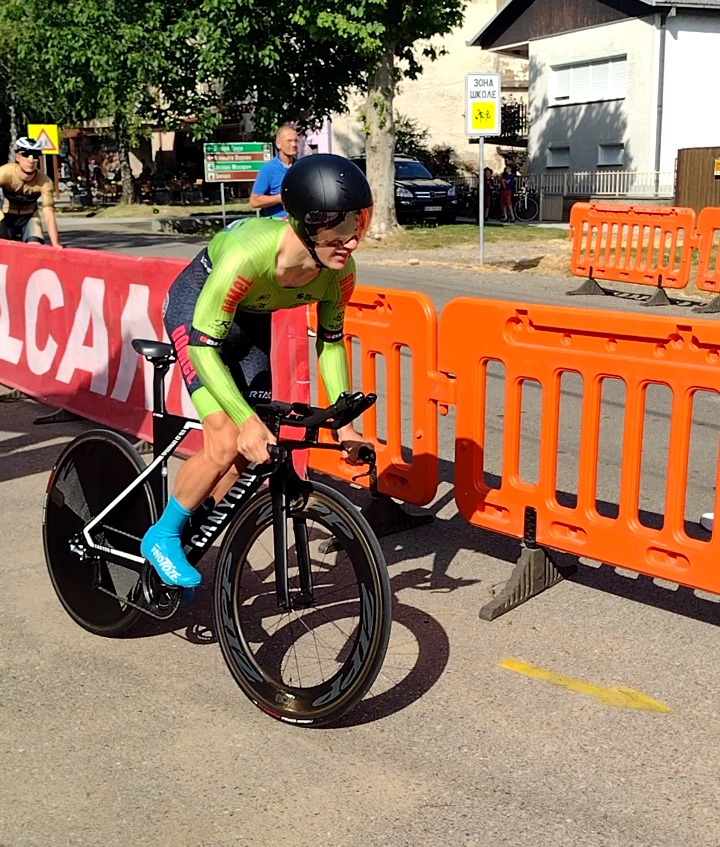
- Turkulov at the 2022 Serbian national time trial championships

Personal information
- Born: 31 October 2003 (age 22) Serbia

Cycling career
- Sport: Cycling
- Current team: Factor Racing
- Discipline: Road
- Role: Rider

Professional team
- 2022–: Cycling Team Kranj

Luka Turkulov (born 31 October 2003) is a Serbian road cyclist, who rides for Slovenian UCI Continental team Factor Racing.

He won the 2022 Serbian national under-23 time trial championship and placed second in the elite road race behind Dušan Rajović. He was also the fastest at the National Championship 2022 for the best hill climber in ELITE category in Serbia BSS In 2022, he started more than 39 UCI races as one of the youngest cyclists.

Turkulov entered the world of cycling in April 2021, when he joined the Serbian national team. Before that, he did Judo and Sambo (martial art) for 11 years.

== Major results ==
2023
3rd National Cyclo-cross Championships
3rd Night Criterium Kranj 2023 (55 GP KRANJ)
2022
1st Time trial, National Under-23 Road Championships
1st Hill-climb, National Road Championships
National Road Championships

2nd Road race
5th Time trial

9th Overall Grand Prix Cycliste de Gemenc
2023
National Under-23 Road Championships

1st Time trial
3rd Road race

1st Stage 3 Tour of Albania
National Road Championships

4th Road race
4th Time trial

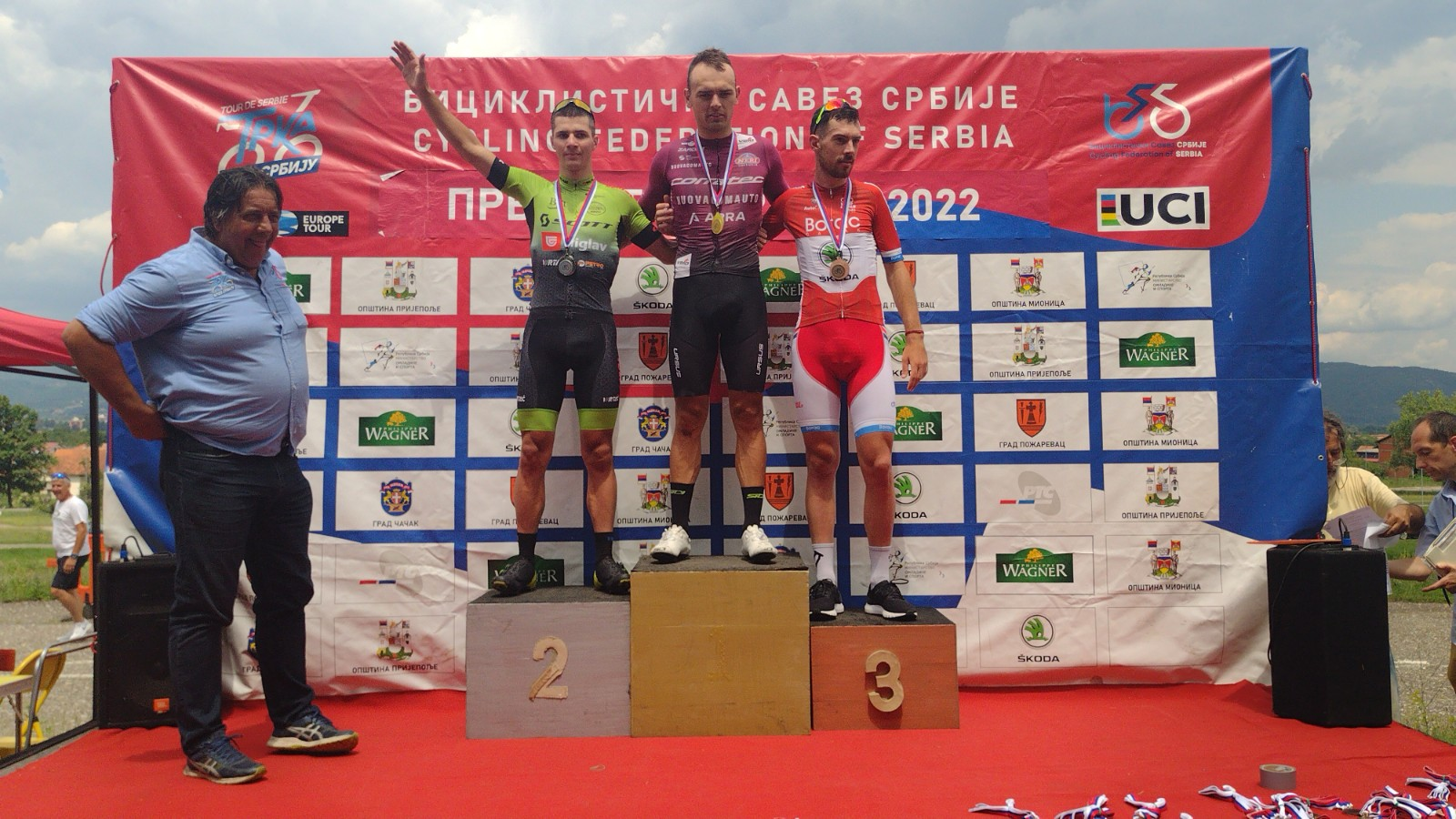
Turkulov on the podium of the 2022 Serbian National Road Championships.
