= Veljko Stojnić =

Serbian cyclist

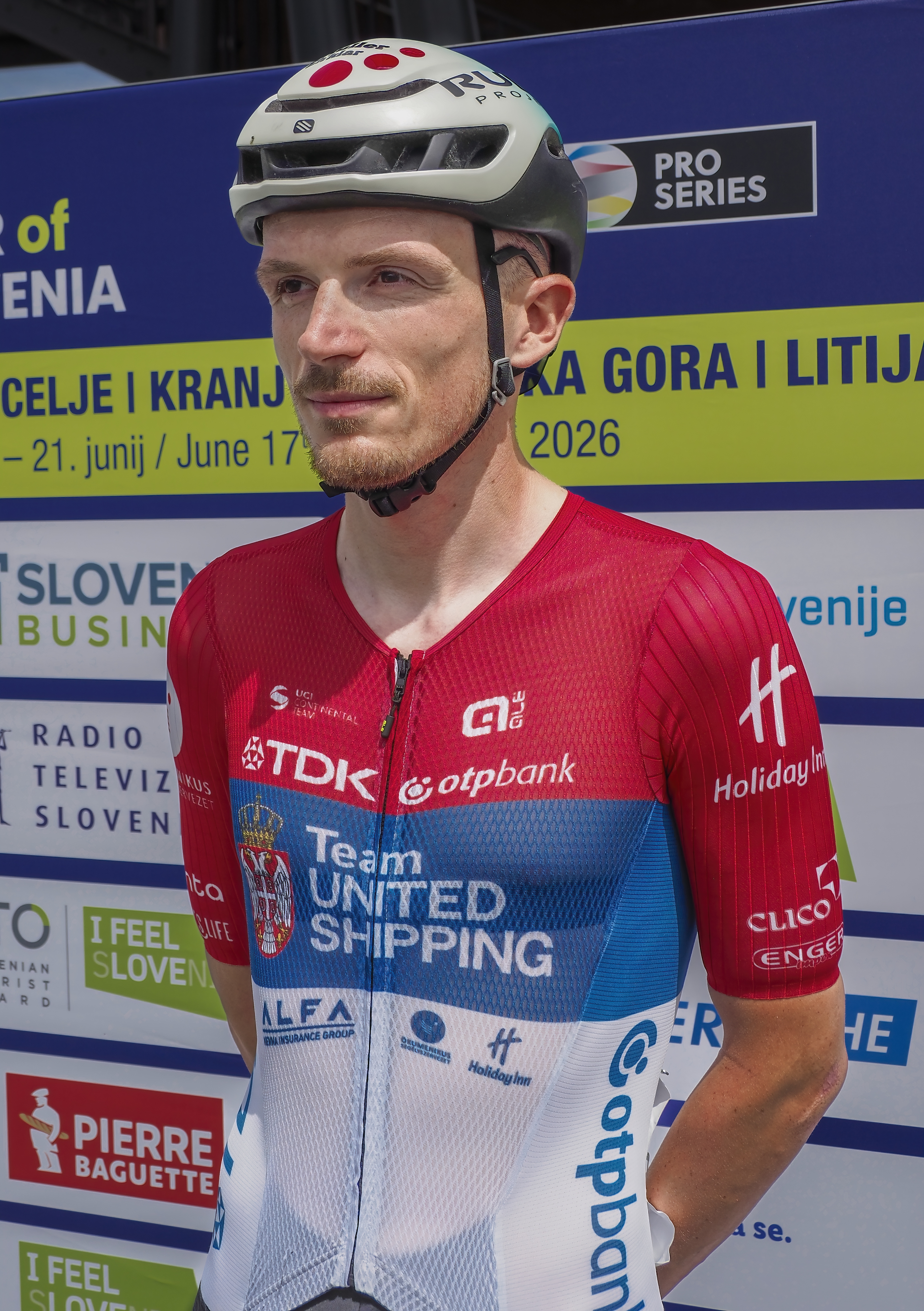
- Stojnić at the 2026 Tour of Slovenia

Personal information
- Full name: Veljko Stojnić
- Born: 4 February 1999 (age 27) Sombor, Serbia and Montenegro
- Height: 1.87 m (6 ft 2 in)
- Weight: 73 kg (161 lb)

Cycling career
- Sport: Cycling
- Current team: Team United Shipping
- Discipline: Road
- Role: Rider
- Rider type: Breakaway specialist

Amateur teams
- 2018: World Cycling Centre
- 2019: Team Franco Ballerini
- 2024: Lotus Team

Professional teams
- 2020–2021: Vini Zabù–KTM
- 2022–2023: Team Corratec
- 2025–: Team United Shipping

Major wins
- One-day races and Classics National Time Trial Championships (2018, 2020) National Road Championships (2026)

Veljko Stojnić (born 4 February 1999) is a Serbian professional road cyclist, who currently rides for UCI Continental team Team United Shipping.

== Major results ==
2016
Junior National Road Championships

1st Time trial
2nd Road race

2017
Junior National Road Championships

1st Road race
1st Time trial

2nd Overall Belgrade Trophy Milan Panić
8th Time trial, UEC European Junior Road Championships
9th Overall Course de la Paix Juniors
2018
1st Time trial, National Road Championships
6th Time trial, Mediterranean Games
2019
National Road Championships

2nd Road race
2nd Time trial

2020
1st Time trial, National Road Championships
1st Sprints classification, UAE Tour
2nd Overall In the footsteps of the Romans
2021
1st Mountains classification, Czech Cycling Tour
2022
1st Stage 4 Tour de la Guadeloupe
1st Stage 6 Vuelta a Venezuela
National Road Championships

3rd Time trial
4th Road race

2023
Combativity award Stage 3 Giro d'Italia
National Road Championships

3rd Time trial
3rd Road race

6th GP Vorarlberg
6th Cupa Max Ausnit
2024
1st Overall Tour of Albania

1st Stage 4

3rd Time trial, National Road Championships
8th Overall Tour of Szeklerland
2025
1st Road race, National Road Championships
2026
1st Road race, National Road Championships
2nd Overall Belgrade Banjaluka

=== Grand Tour general classification results timeline ===
Grand Tour	2023
Giro d'Italia	101
Tour de France	—
Vuelta a España	—
