= Nankang–Dynatek =

Cycling team (2013–15)

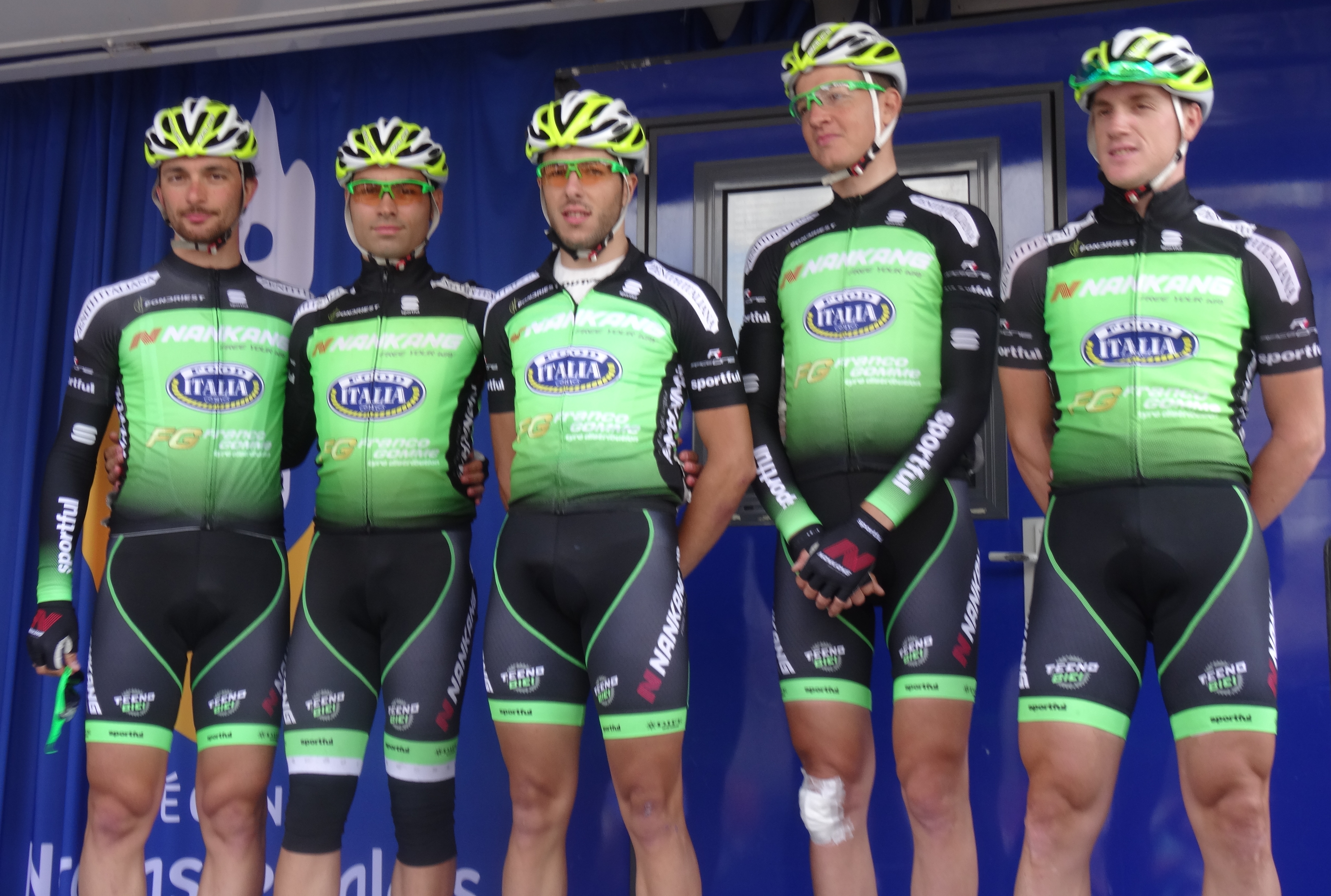

Team information
- UCI code: NAN
- Registered: Italy: 2013–2014; Serbia: 2015
- Founded: 2013
- Disbanded: 2015
- Discipline: Road
- Status: Continental

Key personnel
- General manager: Roberto Marrone
- Team managers: Riccardo Forconi; Simone Borgheresi

Team name history
- 2013 2014 2015: Ceramica Flaminia–Fondriest; Nankang–Fondriest; Nankang–Dynatek

Nankang–Dynatek (UCI team code: NAN) was a UCI Continental cycling team founded in 2013 that disbanded after the 2015 season. It was originally sponsored by Ceramica Flaminia, an Italian tile manufacturer which previously sponsored the Ceramica Flaminia team between 2005 and 2010, and was based in Lucca, Tuscany, Italy. Ceramica Flaminia-Fondriest was established as a development squad for Tinkoff. It was later sponsored by Nankang, a tire company, and was based in Serbia.

== Team roster ==
As of 31 December 2015.

Rider	Date of birth
Nemanja Ambrus (SRB)	17 February 1994 (aged 21)
Alfredo Balloni (ITA)	20 September 1989 (aged 26)
Marko Danilović (SRB)	23 April 1993 (aged 22)
Gabor Kasa (SRB)	3 February 1989 (aged 26)
Luka Kotur (SRB)	27 January 1995 (aged 20)
Alessandro Mazzi (ITA)	16 November 1987 (aged 28)

Rider	Date of birth
Aleksandar Mitić (SRB)	1 April 1995 (aged 20)
Milos Nikcevic (MNE)	3 February 1994 (aged 21)
Marko Stanković (SRB)	8 July 1988 (aged 27)
Ivan Stević (SRB)	12 March 1980 (aged 35)
Jovan Zekavica (SRB)	20 January 1991 (aged 24)
Nikita Zharoven (BLR)	14 November 1992 (aged 23)

== Major wins ==
2013
Stage 3 Okolo Slovenska, Andrea Fedi
Giro dell'Appennino, Davide Mucelli
2015
Serbia National Road Race Championships, Ivan Stević
Serbia National Time Trial Championships, Gabor Kasa
Stage 5 Tour of Bulgaria, Ivan Stević
Stage 1 International Tour of Torku Mevlana, Ivan Stević
