= Jelena Erić (cyclist) =

Serbian cyclist (born 1996)

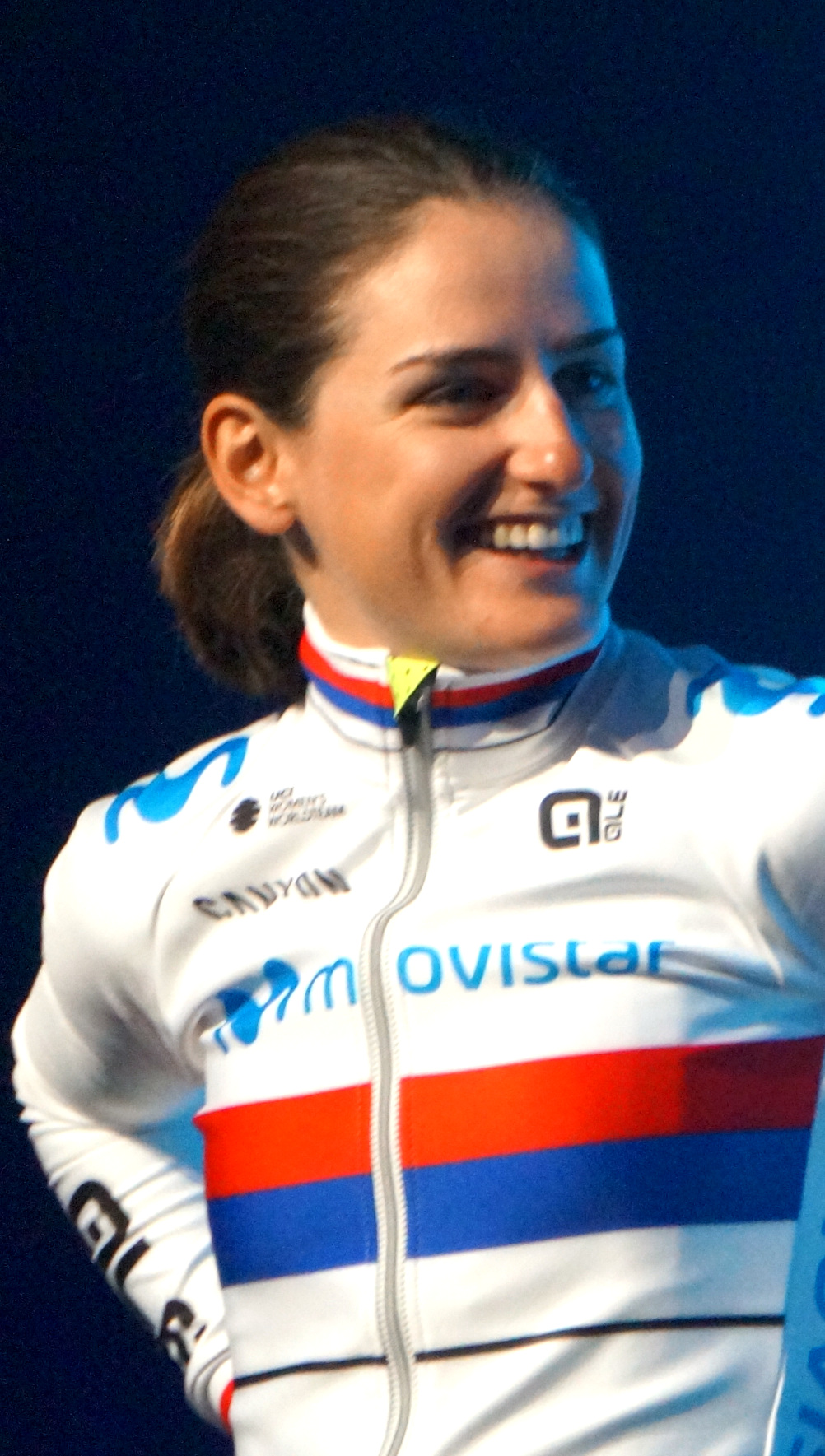
- Erić on 2020 Omloop Het Nieuwsblad

Personal information
- Full name: Jelena Erić
- Born: 15 January 1996 (age 30): Kraljevo, FR Yugoslavia; (now Serbia)
- Height: 1.63 m (5 ft 4 in)
- Weight: 53 kg (117 lb)

Cycling career
- Sport: Cycling
- Current team: Movistar Team
- Disciplines: Road; Cyclo-cross
- Role: Rider

Professional teams
- 2015–2017: BTC City Ljubljana
- 2018: Cylance Pro Cycling
- 2019: Alé–Cipollini
- 2020–: Movistar Team

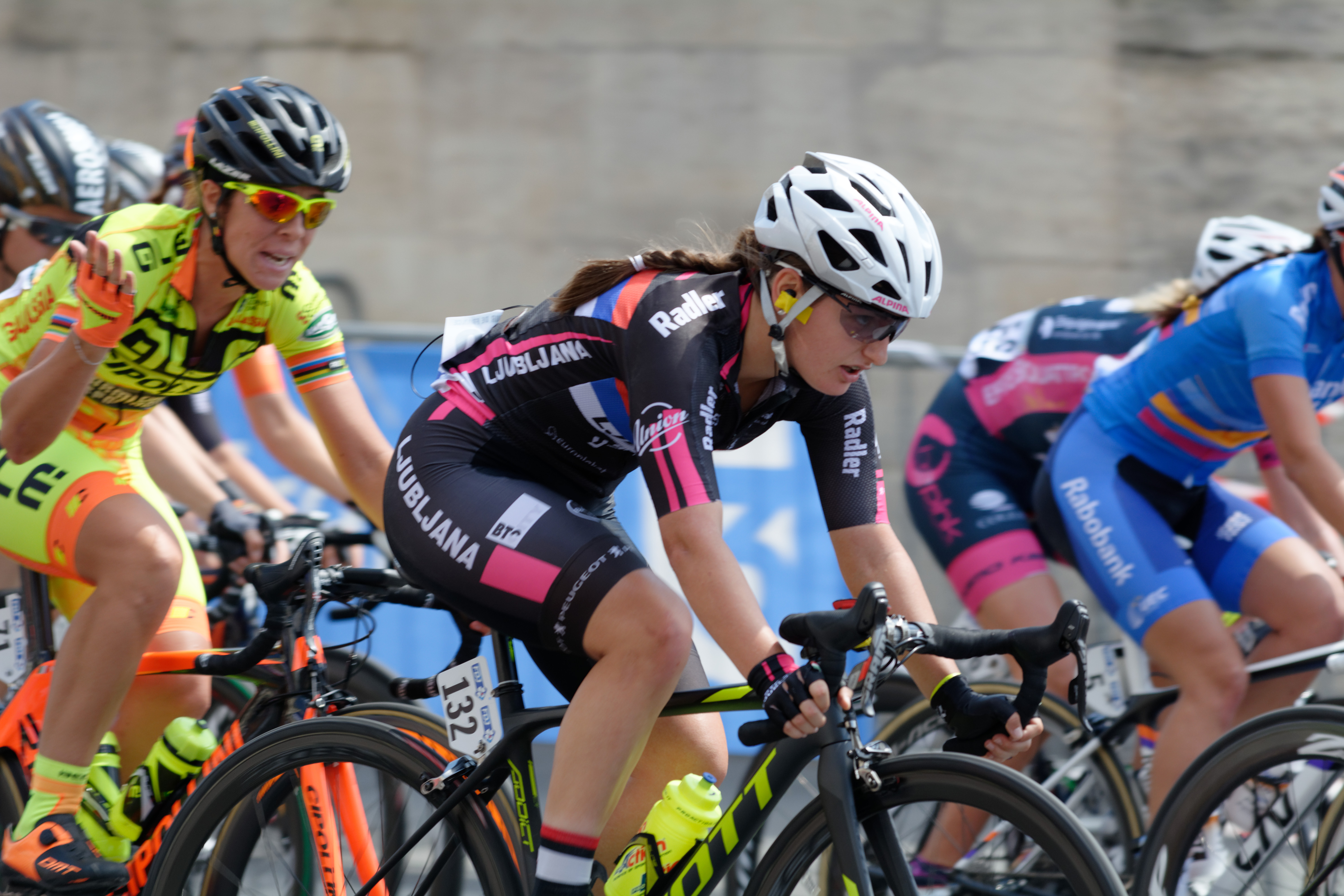
Erić in the 2016 La Course by Le Tour de France

Jelena Erić (born 15 January 1996 in Kraljevo) is a Serbian professional racing cyclist, who currently rides for UCI Women's WorldTeam Movistar Team.

== Major results ==
2011
National Road Championships

1st Road race
3rd Time trial

2012
2nd Road race, National Road Championships
2014
National Road Championships

1st Road race
1st Time trial

8th Road race, UCI World Junior Road Championships
2015
7th Crescent Vårgårda UCI Women's WorldTour TTT
2016
National Road Championships

1st Road race
1st Time trial

2017
National Road Championships

1st Road race
1st Time trial

3rd Grand Prix de Dottignies
4th Tour of Guangxi#Tour of Guangxi Women's Elite World Challenge
6th Overall Tour of Zhoushan Island
2018
National Road Championships

1st Road race
1st Time trial

2019
National Road Championships

1st Road race
1st Time trial

1st Stage 2 BeNe Ladies Tour
2020
10th Omloop van het Hageland
10th La Périgord Ladies
2021
National Road Championships

1st Road race

2nd Ronde de Mouscron
8th GP Oetingen
2022
National Road Championships

1st Road race

1st Stage 3 Vuelta Ciclista Andalucia Ruta Del Sol
4th GP City of Eibar
2023
National Road Championships

1st Road race

2025
2nd Vuelta CV Feminas

== See also ==
- List of 2015 UCI Women's Teams and riders
