= Java–Partizan Pro Cycling Team =

Cycling team

Team information
- UCI code: KMP (2014–2015); DAG (2016); DVP (2017–)
- Registered: Croatia (2014–2016); Serbia (2017–)
- Founded: 2014
- Discipline: Road
- Status: UCI continental
- Bicycles: Java
- Components: SRAM
- Website: Team home page

Key personnel
- General manager: Dušan Banović
- Team managers: Anthony Delacourt; Andri Rosadi; Peter Murdoch; Joyce Ghijs

Team name history
- 2014–2015 2016 2017 2018–: Keith Mobel–Partizan; Dare Gobik; Dare Viator Partizan; Java–Partizan Pro Cycling Team
Java–Partizan Pro Cycling Team jersey
Jersey

Java–Partizan Pro Cycling Team is a Serbian UCI Continental team founded in 2014. It participates in UCI Continental Circuits races.

== Doping ==
On 20 July 2015 the Chilean Olympic Committee announced that Carlos Oyarzun had been sent home from the 2015 Pan American Games in Toronto after he'd tested positive for the HIF prolyl-hydroxylase inhibitor FG-4592 in a pre-competition test. Oyarzun was due ride the time trial.

== Team roster ==
Rider	Date of birth
Ernad Beganović (SRB)	28 January 1996 (age 30)
Miguel Calatayud (ESP)	30 December 1996 (age 29)
Francisco Castelló (ESP)	13 May 1996 (age 30)
Andrej Galović (SRB)	29 March 1997 (age 29)
Ognjen Ilić (SRB)	21 November 1998 (age 27)
Nebojša Jovanović (SRB)	27 March 1983 (age 43)
Stefan Jovanović (SRB)	19 April 1995 (age 31)
Dušan Kalaba (SRB)	25 May 1996 (age 30)

Rider	Date of birth
Charalampos Kastrantas (GRE)	13 March 1991 (age 35)
Stevan Klisurić (SRB)	8 June 1989 (age 37)
Nikola Kozomara (SRB)	16 December 1991 (age 34)
Carlos Lorente (ESP)	24 September 1992 (age 33)
José Carlos Nuñez (ESP)	23 April 1982 (age 44)
Aleksandar Roman (SRB)	24 November 1996 (age 29)
Óscar Sánchez (ESP)	9 July 1988 (age 38)
Javier Valero (ESP)	2 July 1994 (age 32)

== Major wins ==
2018
Stage 3 Tour de Indonesia, Charalampos Kastrantas
Overall Grand Prix International de la ville d'Alger, Charalampos Kastrantas

Stage 4, Charalampos Kastrantas
