= Lucas Towers =

British cyclist (born 2003)

Personal information
- Full name: Lucas Joseph Towers
- Born: 9 November 2003 (age 22) Swadlincote, England
- Height: 1.77 m (5 ft 10 in)
- Weight: 58 kg (128 lb)

Cycling career
- Sport: Cycling
- Current team: Modern Adventure Pro Cycling
- Discipline: Road
- Role: Rider
- Rider type: Climber

Amateur team
- 2023-2025: Caja Rural-Alea

Professional team
- 2026–: Modern Adventure Pro Cycling

Lucas Joseph Towers (born 9 November 2003) is a British racing cyclist, who currently rides for UCI ProTeam Modern Adventure Pro Cycling.

== Early and personal life ==
From Derbyshire, Towers was born to Jonny and Sam, his father was a British champion motorcyclist and businessman. He was a keen footballer until he was 15 years-old when he focused more on cycling. His sister Alice Towers is also a cyclist, and a British national road race champion.

== Career ==
Towers was coached as a youngster by former professional cyclist Daniel Fleeman. From the age or 16 years-old he raced in amateur races in Spain. Towers rode for junior teams Preveily Conforma and Cero/Cycle Division RT, and had success in junior road races in Spain, Wales and England, as well as South Africa.

Towers rode in Spain full-time from 2022 with support from the Dave Rayner Fund, and for Caja Rural-Alea for three seasons from 2023. From 2026, Towers will ride professionally on American team Modern Adventure Pro Cycling, a professional team having their debut season, and launched and managed by George Hincapie.
