= Tour of Marmara =

Race details
- Date: October–November
- Region: Eastern Marmara region, Turkey
- Local name: Uluslararası Marmara Bisiklet Turu
- Discipline: Road
- Competition: UCI Europe Tour
- Type: Stage race
- Organiser: Turkish Cycling Federation

History
- First edition: 2010
- Editions: 2 (as of July 2012)
- First winner: Kemal Küçükbay (TUR)
- Most recent: Ali Rıza Tanrıverdi (TUR)

Tour of Marmara

The Tour of Marmara (Turkish: Uluslararası Marmara Bisiklet Turu) is an international road cycling race organized by the Turkish Cycling Federation at towns in eastern Marmara region of Turkey. It is part of the UCI Europe Tour having a rating of 2.2.

It was first held in 2010 between October 28–31, at which 70 racers of ten international teams competed in four categories. The tour consists of four stages in a total of 522 km (324 mi) as follows:

1. 102 km (63 mi) (Şile - Kefken)
2. 126 km (78 mi) (Kefken - Akçakoca)
3. 120 km (75 mi) (Akçakoca - Adapazarı)
4. 174 km (108 mi) (Adapazarı - Kocaeli)

== Winners ==
Year	Country	Rider	Team
2010	Turkey	Kemal Küçükbay	Team Kocaeli Brisa
2011	Turkey	Ali Rıza Tanrıverdi	Team Kocaeli Brisa

2012 cancelled
