= Dragana Kovačević =

Serbian cyclist

Personal information
- Born: 26 December 1981 (age 44)

Cycling career
- Sport: Cycling
- Current team: Retired
- Discipline: Road
- Role: Rider

Dragana Kovačević (born 26 December 1981) is a Serbian former racing cyclist. She twice finished as a runner-up at the Serbian National Road Championships in 2012 and 2015. Kovačević also competed in the women's road race at the UCI Road World Championships in 2007 and 2013.
