= Modern Adventure Pro Cycling =

American men's cycling team

Team information
- UCI code: MAP
- Registered: Greenville, South Carolina, U.S.
- Founded: 2026
- Discipline: Road
- Status: UCI ProTeam
- Bicycles: Factor
- Website: Team home page

Key personnel
- General manager: George Hincapie; Richard Hincapie
- Team managers: Bobby Julich; Ty Magner; Alex Howes; Joey Rosskopf

Team name history
- 2026–: Modern Adventure Pro Cycling

Modern Adventure Pro Cycling is an American professional road cycling team that started competing in its first season in 2026. The team holds UCI ProTeam status, the second highest tier.

== History ==
On June 23, 2025, former cyclist George Hincapie and his brother Richard announced that they would establish a new professional cycling team starting in the 2026 season. The team would initially be a UCI ProTeam, with a goal to compete in the Tour de France by 2032. The title sponsor is Portland-based travel agency Modern Adventure, while British bicycle manufacturer Factor Bikes provide bicycles and money for the project.

The management team, in addition to the Hincapie brothers, also includes Bobby Julich as the head directeur sportif, in addition to Ty Magner, Alex Howes, and Joey Rosskopf. The team is headquartered in Greenville, South Carolina with a European base in Girona, Spain.

In November 2025, the 20 riders that formed the inaugural roster were announced, followed by the addition of Tyler Stites in December.

== Team roster ==
As of November 13, 2025

Rider	Date of birth
Sam Boardman (USA)	September 8, 1995 (age 30)
Robin Carpenter (USA)	June 20, 1992 (age 34)
Ezra Caudell (USA)	September 6, 2006 (age 20)
Sean Christian (USA)	April 20, 2002 (age 24)
Stefan de Bod (RSA)	November 17, 1996 (age 29)
Samuel Flórez (COL)	July 28, 2005 (age 21)
Kieran Haug (USA)	October 6, 2002 (age 23)
Leo Hayter (GBR)	August 10, 2001 (age 25)
Cole Kessler (USA)	May 20, 2003 (age 23)
Harry Lasker (USA)	April 10, 2007 (age 19)
Ian López (USA)	October 28, 2003 (age 22)

Rider	Date of birth
Brody McDonald (USA)	August 20, 2002 (age 24)
Scott McGill (USA)	September 20, 1998 (age 27)
Byron Munton (RSA)	December 12, 1998 (age 27)
Ben Oliver (NZL)	December 17, 1996 (age 29)
Riley Pickrell (CAN)	August 16, 2001 (age 25)
Hugo Scala Jr (USA)	December 29, 1997 (age 28)
Mark Stewart (GBR)	August 25, 1995 (age 31)
Tyler Stites (USA)	March 18, 1998 (age 28)
Lucas Towers (GBR)	November 9, 2003 (age 22)
Paul Wright (NZL)	February 3, 1998 (age 28)
