= Factor Bikes =

British bicycle manufacturer

- Type: Private
- Founded: 2016
- Founder: Rob Gitelis
- Headquarters: Hethel Engineering Centre, Norfolk, NR14 8FB, United Kingdom
- Number of locations: Taichung, Taiwan; China
- Products: Bicycles
- Subsidiaries: Black Inc
- Website: factorbikes.com

Factor Bikes is a high-end British bicycle manufacturer. Founded in 2016 from an offshoot of a performance car engineering company by Rob Gitelis, a former professional cyclist and a specialist in the manufacture of carbon fibre equipment, the company has supplied road bikes to UCI World Tour, UCI Women's World Tour and Pro Continental teams, and currently produces the Factor ONE, which it claims is "the fastest UCI-legal road bike in the world".

== History ==
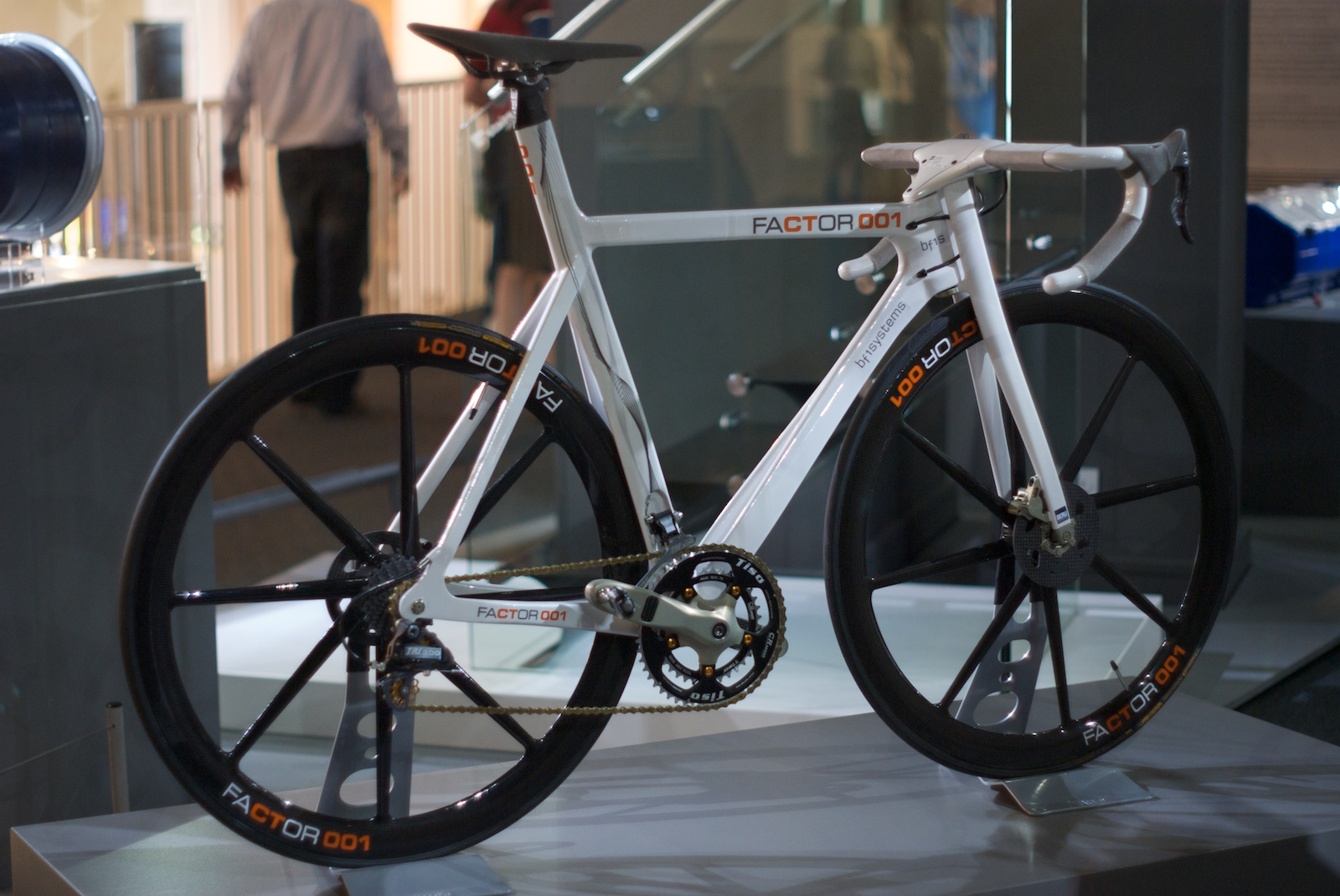
Factor001 on display at the Science Museum, London, in 2012

The Norfolk-based engineering group Beru F1 Systems, founded in 1993, released a radically designed bike in 2007 called the Factor001, costing £25,000. This was a training bike that Bike Radar magazine claimed "leaps ahead of anything the cycling world has even envisaged" and was called "the most advanced bike ever made". Five years later the company, now renamed BF1 Systems, produced a second bike, this time in conjunction with the luxury sports car maker Aston Martin. Called the One-77, this model had several elements in common with the Factor001, and was limited to 77 individual bikes, with the company making them – Factorbikes, a subsidiary of BF1 – using seven staff taking two weeks to build each one. They were equipped with a "motorsport-derived data logging system" and other kit not found in road bikes at the time.

In 2013, BF1 developed another advanced carbon-frame bicycle, called the Factor Vis Vires. The company contacted Rob Gitelis, who had experience building carbon bike frames in Taiwan for companies such as Cervélo, to help develop the bicycle and create a brand. In 2016, the brand Factor was launched at the Tour Down Under in Australia.

Australian tech billionaire Scott Farquhar invested in the company, alongside the growth equity investment firm Point King Capital, based in Sydney, Australia, and Farquhar's own private investment firm Skip Capital, as did four-time Tour de France winner Chris Froome, who is also a director of the company. In 2025, Point King Capital and Skip Capital sold part of their holdings in Factor to a subsidiary of Chinese company Zhonglu Advantage Global Investment Co. Ltd called Forever Bicycles, as well as to another Chinese company, VSI Cycling Limited. Zhonglu owns 21.15% of Factor and VSI owns 31.72%.

Former time-trial specialist David Millar was appointed Factor brand director in 2025.

Factor owns its own manufacturing facilities, one based in Taichung, Taiwan, the other in China, meaning that its products have a great degree of potential customisation.

== Controversies ==
In 2025, Colombian frame builder Scarab wrote Factor a cease and desist letter over alleged similarities between its products and the branding and logo of the Factor Ostro Vam Scarab model.

== Product range ==
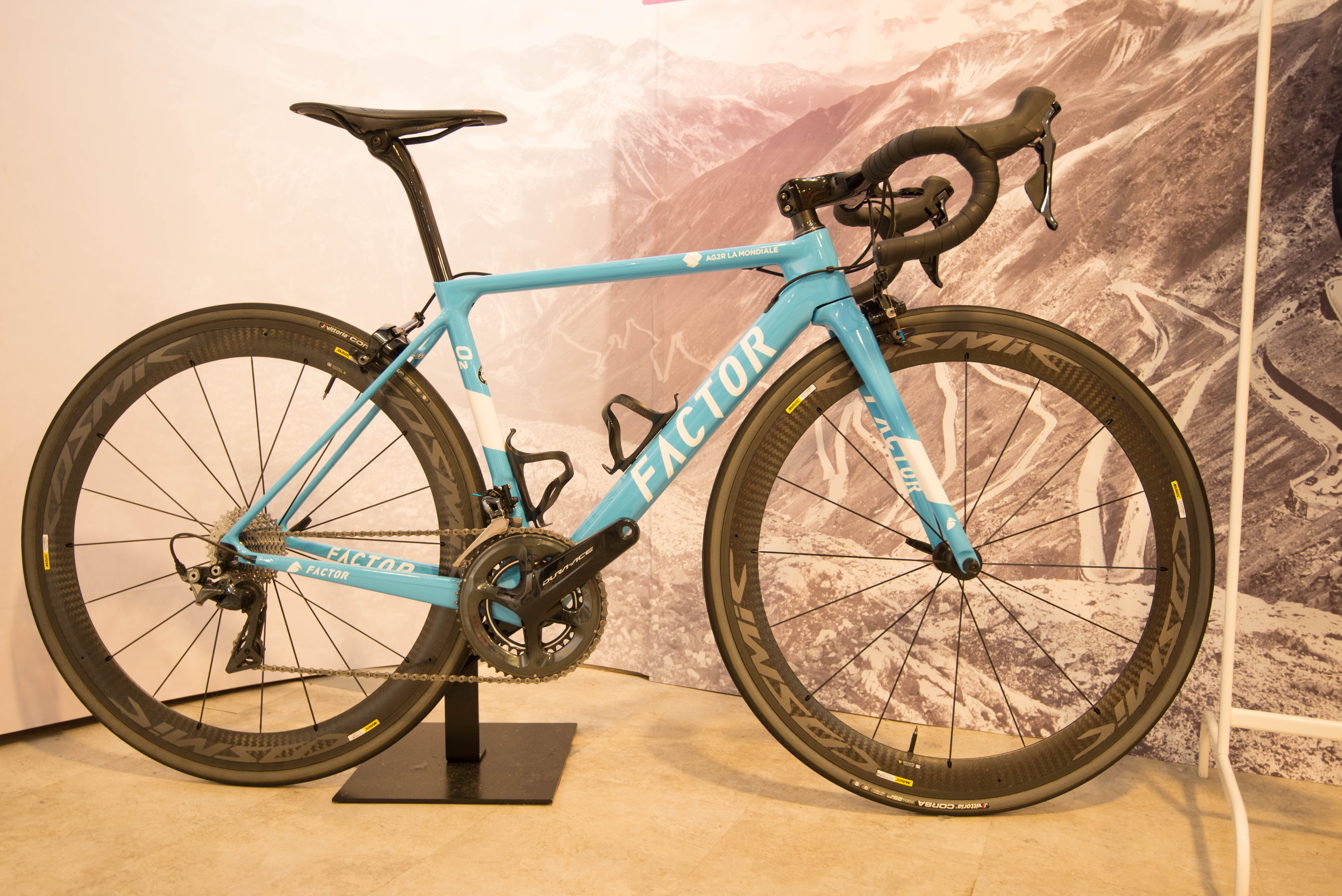
Factor O2 in the colours of the AG2R La Mondiale team

Factor Bikes designs and produces road bicycles, time trial bicycles, mountain bikes, gravel bicycles and track bicycles. Its Black Inc subsidiary designs and produces carbon wheels and other bicycle components.

== Sponsorship ==
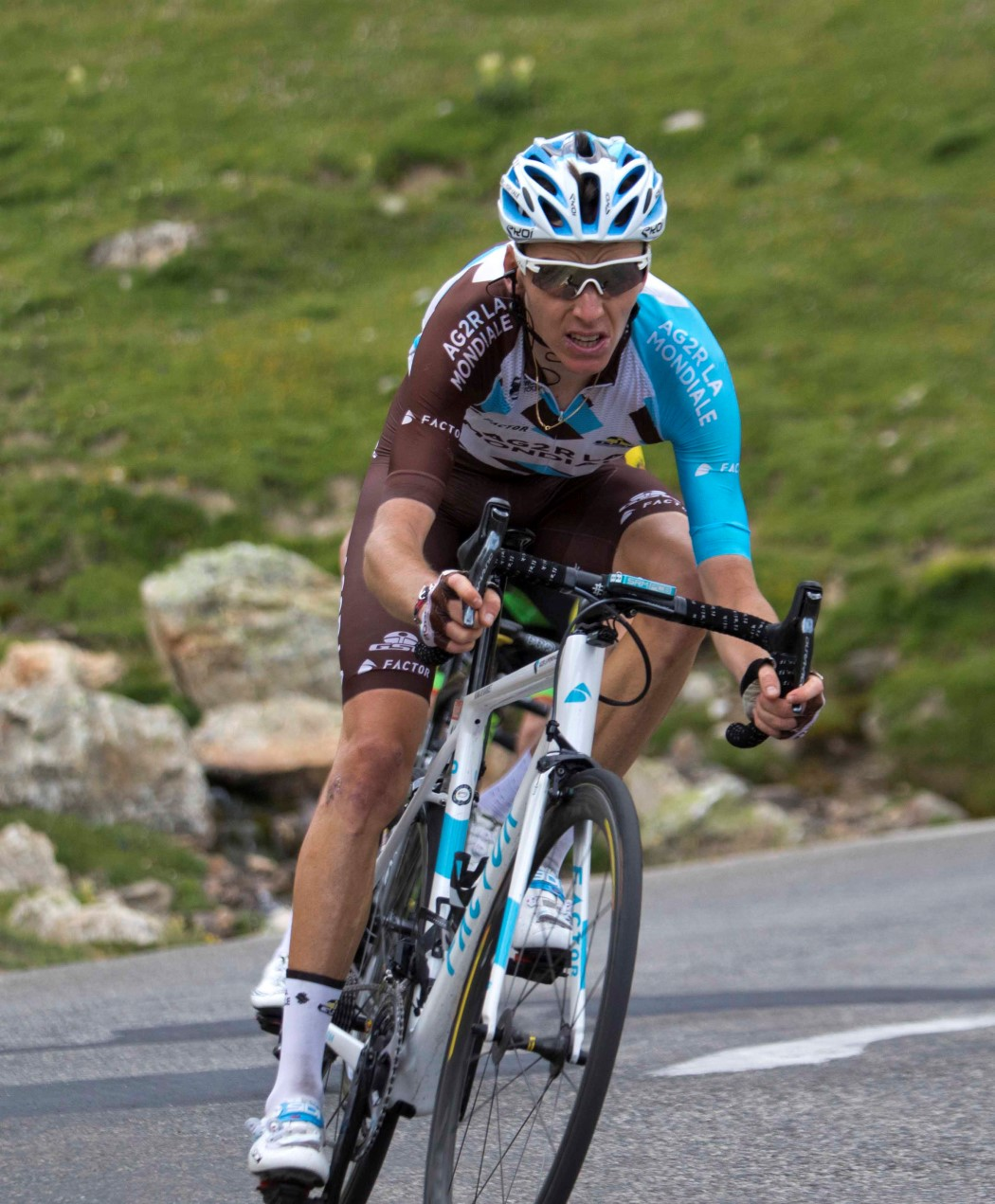
Romain Bardet of the AG2R La Mondiale team riding a Factor O2 in the 2017 Tour de France.

=== ONE Pro Cycling ===
In 2016, Factor supplied bikes to the Pro Continental team ONE Pro Cycling.

=== AG2R La Mondiale ===
Factor supplied bikes to the UCI World Tour team AG2R La Mondiale from 2017 to 2020, with French rider Romain Bardet finishing third for the team in the 2017 Tour de France. The bike he used was the O2 model with a Shimano Dura-Ace groupset and Mavic Cosmic wheels.

=== Israel–Premier Tech ===
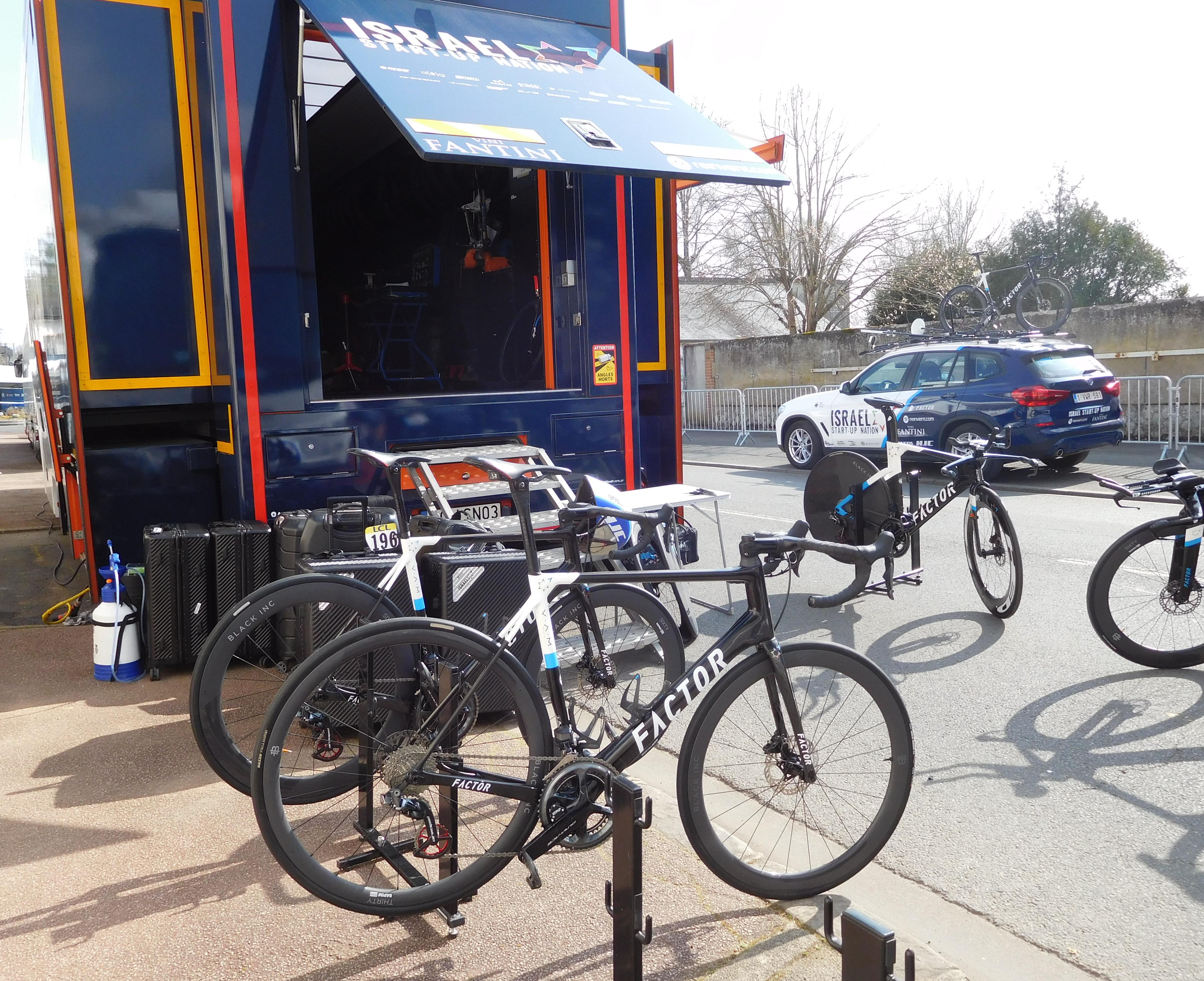
Two Factor Ostro VAMs with Black Inc wheels in Israel Start-Up Nation colours before Stage 3 of the 2021 Paris–Nice race in Gien, with a Factor SLiCK Disc time trial bike (background)

From 2020, Factor supplied bikes to the UCI World Tour team Israel Start-Up Nation. In 2025, the Factor ONE, claimed to be the "fastest UCI-legal road bike in the world", was ridden by the Israel–Premier Tech team in the Critérium du Dauphiné, with Jake Stewart winning Stage 5 on the model.

This team, which was rebranded Israel–Premier Tech in 2022, was accused of "sportswashing [Israel's] grave crimes against Palestinians". Gitelis defended the partnership, stating in an interview with Cycling News, "I think that people understand that we're a bike company for the most part. We're not condoning what's happening there." Even though there were calls for the team to be banned from the 2025 Tour de France, Factor and Israel-Premier Tech delivered a press announcement on 3 July 2025 – two days before the race began – stating that they had agreed a new multi-year contract, with Gitelis saying that he was "delighted to continue our partnership with Israel – Premier Tech. [...] This partnership is where innovation meets reality, and that's where Factor thrives."

After the 2025 Vuelta a España, however, the next Grand Tour in the 2025 pro calendar, Factor's involvement with the Israel-Premier Tech team came to an end. On the final stage of the race, the traditional ceremonial procession into Madrid, 100,000 demonstrators protesting against the Gaza war lined the route, with numerous protesters invading the road at several points of the final circuit. The stage was cancelled completely after the police fired tear gas, rubber bullets and charged against the demonstrators. According to news reports, both Factor and team sponsor Premier Tech had been calling for the team to change its identity, and in late 2025, Israel–Premier Tech withdrew their sponsorship of the team and a new sponsor, NSL, stepped in. The newly named team was slated to ride Scott bikes rather than Factor in 2026.

=== Modern Adventure Pro Cycling ===
The American ProTeam Modern Adventure Pro Cycling, founded by ex-pro George Hincapie, started using Factor bikes in 2026, their first season, with the Factor brand manager David Millar advising and with Factor Bikes financing behind the project.

=== Factor Racing ===
This is the name given to a multi-disciplinary racing team that includes a gravel race team and a Slovenian UCI Continental road bike team.

=== Human Powered Health ===
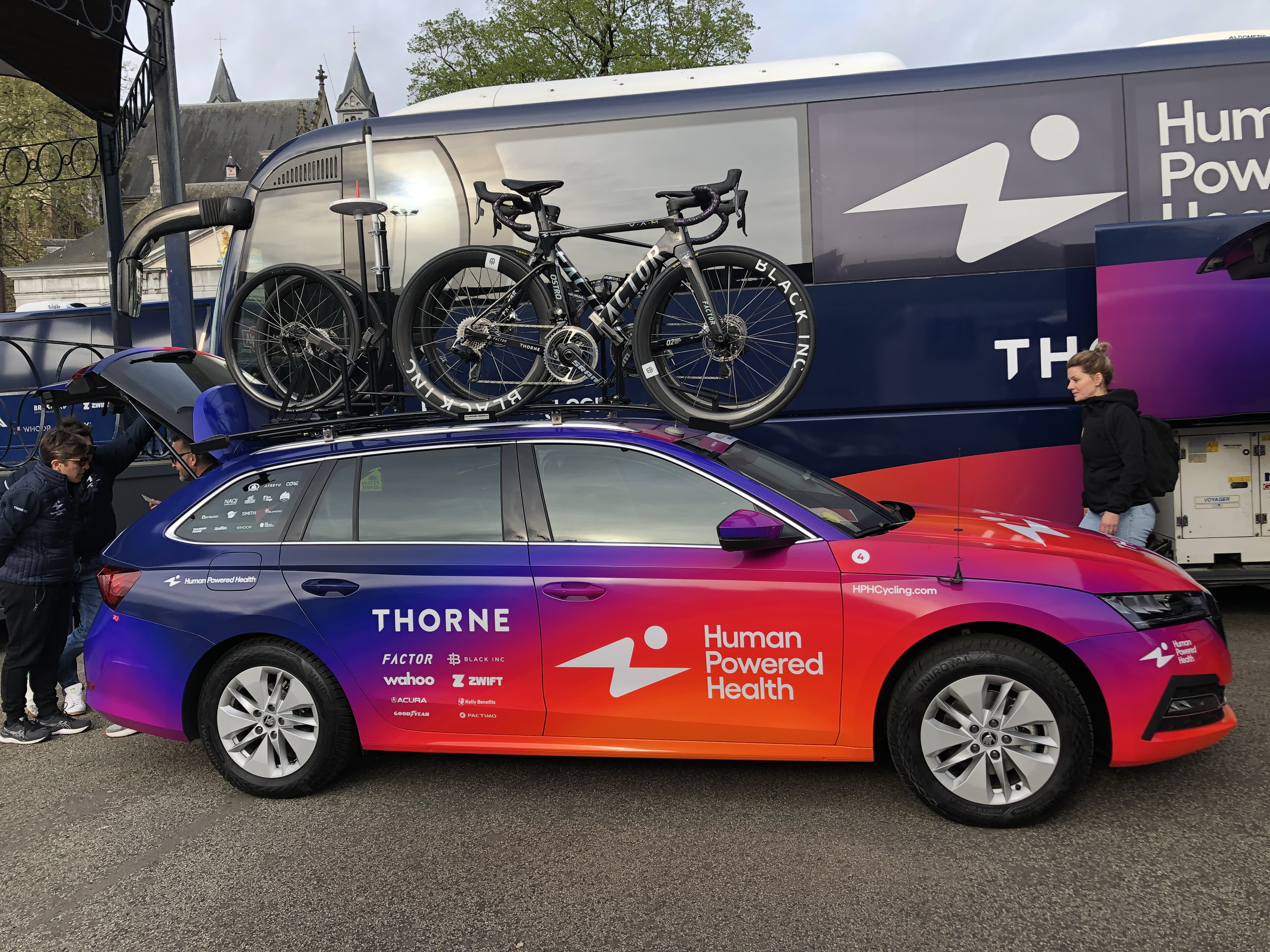
A pair of the Human Powered Health team's Factor Ostro VAMs before the start of the 2024 Amstel Gold Race

In the UCI Women's World Tour, the Human Powered Health team has been using Factor bikes since 2024.

== Track racing ==
Factor's first track bike, used by the Australian men's team pursuit team in the 2024 Paris Olympics, was the Factor Hanzo, which retailed for $97,979 in 2024. This price was set because Olympic rules state that all bikes used in the Games have to be commercially available; with such a high price, the Australian team were assured that their competitors would not use the same bike, despite being able to in principle. Factor were assisted in the development of the Hanzo by AusCycling, with input from several Australian specialists in the motor racing, road racing and aeronautical sectors. The Australian team of Oliver Bleddyn, Sam Welsford, Conor Leahy and Kelland O'Brien won the gold medal in the team pursuit in Paris riding Hanzos, breaking the world record in the first round of heats in a time of 3:40.730. As of 2026, this bike costs $59,999 and is called the Factor HANZŌ Track Paris Edition, to distinguish it from the company's much less expensive Factor HANZŌ Track model.

=== Hour record ===
British cyclist Alex Dowsett rode a heavily modified Factor Hanzo, which was only available as a time trial bicycle at the time rather than a dedicated track bike, in his attempt to break the men's hour record at the Aguascalientes velodrome in Mexico on 3 November 2021. He recorded a distance of 54.555km, just over 500m less than Victor Campenaerts' 2019 record of 55.089km, but beating Bradley Wiggins's British national record distance of 54.526km set in 2015.
