= Factor Racing =

Slovenian cycling team

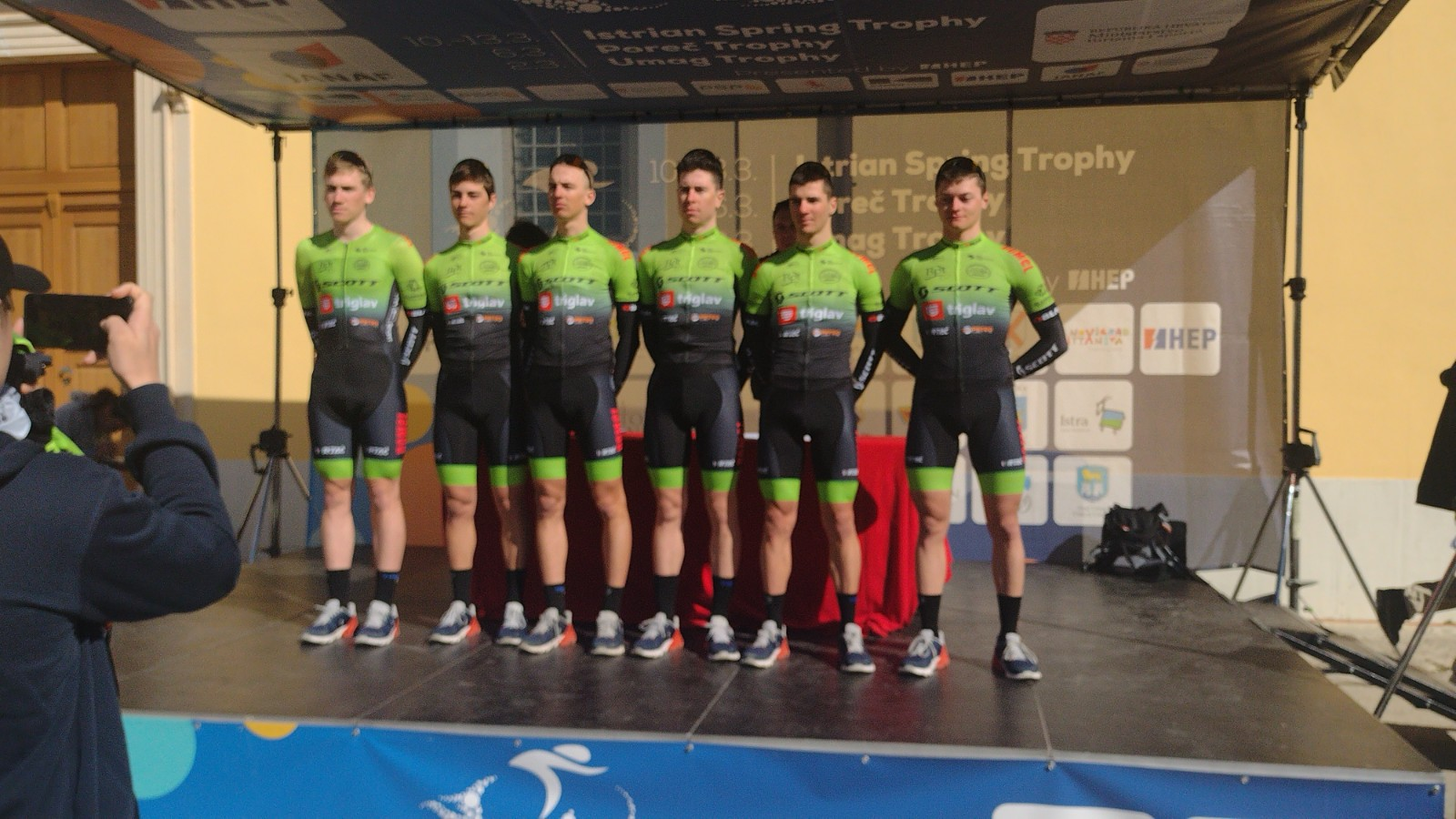
- The team in 2022

Team information
- UCI code: FRT
- Registered: Slovenia
- Founded: 1957
- Discipline: Road
- Status: Division III (2004); National(2014–2021); UCI Continental (2005–2013, 2022–)
- Bicycles: Scott (2013–2024); Factor (2025–)

Key personnel
- General manager: Matjaž Zevnik
- Team manager: Matej Stare

Team name history
- 2004; 2005–2013; 2014; 2015–2016; 2017–2021; 2022–2023; 2024; 2025–: Sava Kranj; Sava; KK Sava Kranj; Sava; KK Kranj; Cycling Team Kranj; Sava Kranj Cycling; Factor Racing

Factor Racing (UCI team code: FRT) is a Slovenian UCI Continental cycling team which rejoined the Continental rank in 2022. It originated from the amateur Kolesarski klub Kranj (Sava), which was founded in 1957.

Former riders include current UCI WorldTour Professionals Matej Mohorič and Luka Mezgec as well as former Professionals; Tadej Valjavec and Grega Bole.

== Team roster ==
As of 1 August 2022

Rider	Date of birth
Andrej Černe (SLO)	16 November 2003 (age 22)
Maks Cvjetičanin (SLO)	3 July 2003 (age 23)
Matej Drinovec (SLO)	16 August 1991 (age 35)
Luka Jablanovec (SLO)	6 November 2003 (age 22)
Vid Jeromel (SLO)	25 April 2003 (age 23)
Bine Lotrič (SLO)	20 December 2002 (age 23)

Rider	Date of birth
Enej Mertelj (SLO)	4 September 2003 (age 23)
Leon Šarc (SLO)	28 May 1996 (age 30)
Luka Turkulov (SRB)	31 October 2003 (age 23)
Jaka Vovk (SLO)	18 September 2002 (age 24)
Luka Ziherl (SLO)	24 September 2002 (age 24)

== Major wins ==
2005
Austria Time Trial Championships, Hans-Peter Obwaller
2006
Stage 1 The Paths of King Nikola, Grega Bole
Stage 2 Okolo Slovenska, Grega Bole
2007
Slovenia Time Trial Championships, Kristijan Koren
Stage 1 Istrian Spring Trophy, Grega Bole
Stage 2 The Paths of King Nikola, Vladimir Kerkez
Stage 1 Giro della Regione Friuli Venezia Giulia, Grega Bole
Stage 4 Giro della Regione Friuli Venezia Giulia, Vladimir Kerkez
2008
Poreč Trophy, Aldo Ino Ilešič
Belgrade–Banja Luka I, Aldo Ino Ilešič
Stage 1 Giro della Regione Friuli Venezia Giulia, Uroš Silar
Stage 2 Grand Prix Cycliste de Gemenc, Gašper Švab
2009
Stage 2 The Paths of King Nikola, Vladimir Kerkez
Stage 3 The Paths of King Nikola, Matej Stare
GP Kranj, Gašper Švab
GP P-Nivo, Uroš Silar
2010
Stage 1 Istrian Spring Trophy, Blaž Furdi
Gran Premio Palio del Recioto, Blaž Furdi
Banja Luka–Beograd I, Jure Zrimšek
2011
Stage 1 Istrian Spring Trophy, Luka Mezgec
Memoriał Henryka Łasaka, Luka Mezgec
2012
Stage 5 Five Rings of Moscow, Luka Mezgec
Stages 2, 4, 6, 11 & 13 Tour of Qinghai Lake, Luka Mezgec
2013
Stage 4 Rhône-Alpes Isère Tour, Mark Džamastagič
Trofeo Città di San Vendemiano, Mark Džamastagič
Stage 1b Okolo Slovenska, Tim Mikelj
2015
Grand Prix Sarajevo, Gašper Katrašnik
2022
Serbia Under-23 National Time trial, Luka Turkulov
2023
Serbia Under-23 National Time trial, Luka Turkulov
Stage 3 Tour of Albania, Luka Turkulov
2026
Umag Classic, 1= Adam Bradáč

== National champions ==
2022
Under-23 National Time trial, Luka Turkulov
2023
Under-23 National Time trial, Luka Turkulov
