= Đorđe Đurić (cyclist) =

Serbian cyclist

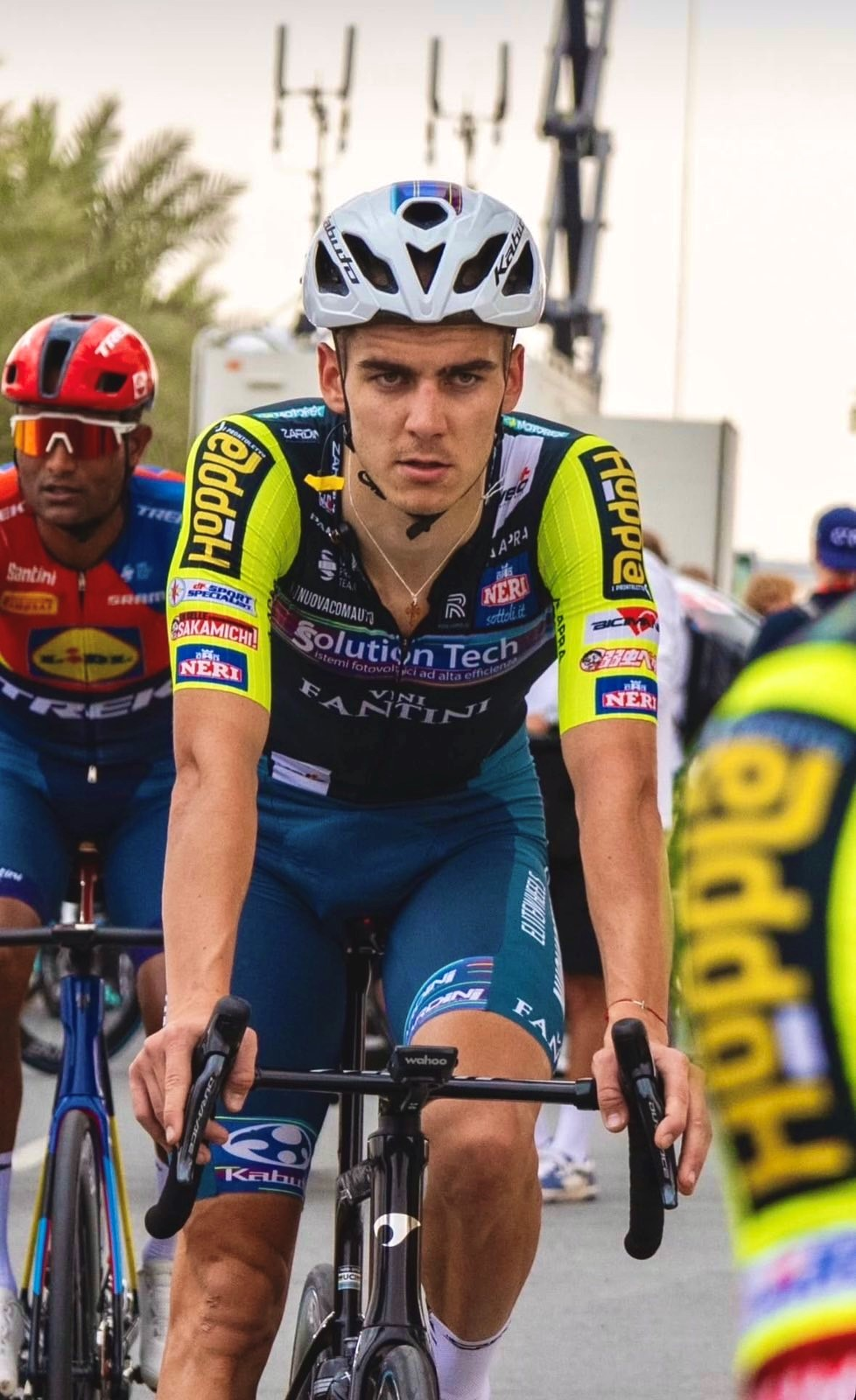
- Đurić in 2025

Personal information
- Full name: Đorđe Đurić
- Born: 21 June 2000 (age 26) Aranđelovac, Serbia
- Height: 1.93 m (6 ft 4 in)
- Weight: 79 kg (174 lb)

Cycling career
- Sport: Cycling
- Current team: Solution Tech NIPPO Rali
- Discipline: Road
- Role: Rider

Amateur teams
- 2019: WCC Team
- 2022: Philippe Wagner Cycling

Professional teams
- 2023–2024: Adria Mobil
- 2025–: Team Solution Tech–Vini Fantini

Major wins
- One-day races and Classics National Road Race Championships (2020)

Đorđe Đurić (born 21 Jun 2000) is a Serbian cyclist, who currently rides for Solution Tech NIPPO Rali.

== Major results ==
2017
National Junior Road Championships

2nd Road race
2nd Time trial

2018
National Junior Road Championships

1st Road race
1st Time trial

2019
4th Road race, National Road Championships
9th Horizon Park Race Classic
10th Overall In the Steps of Romans

1st Young rider classification

2020
1st Road race, National Road Championships
2022
2nd Time trial, National Under-23 Road Championships
4th Time trial, National Road Championships
6th Road race, Mediterranean Games
7th Overall In the Steps of Romans

1st Young rider classification

9th Overall Tour of Albania
9th Nocturne de Bar-sur-Aube
2023
National Road Championships

2nd Road race
2nd Time trial

2024
4th Road race, National Road Championships
6th Overall Tour of Albania

1st Points classification
1st Stage 1

2025
1st Sprints classification, UAE Tour
