= Mersin Road Cycling Race =

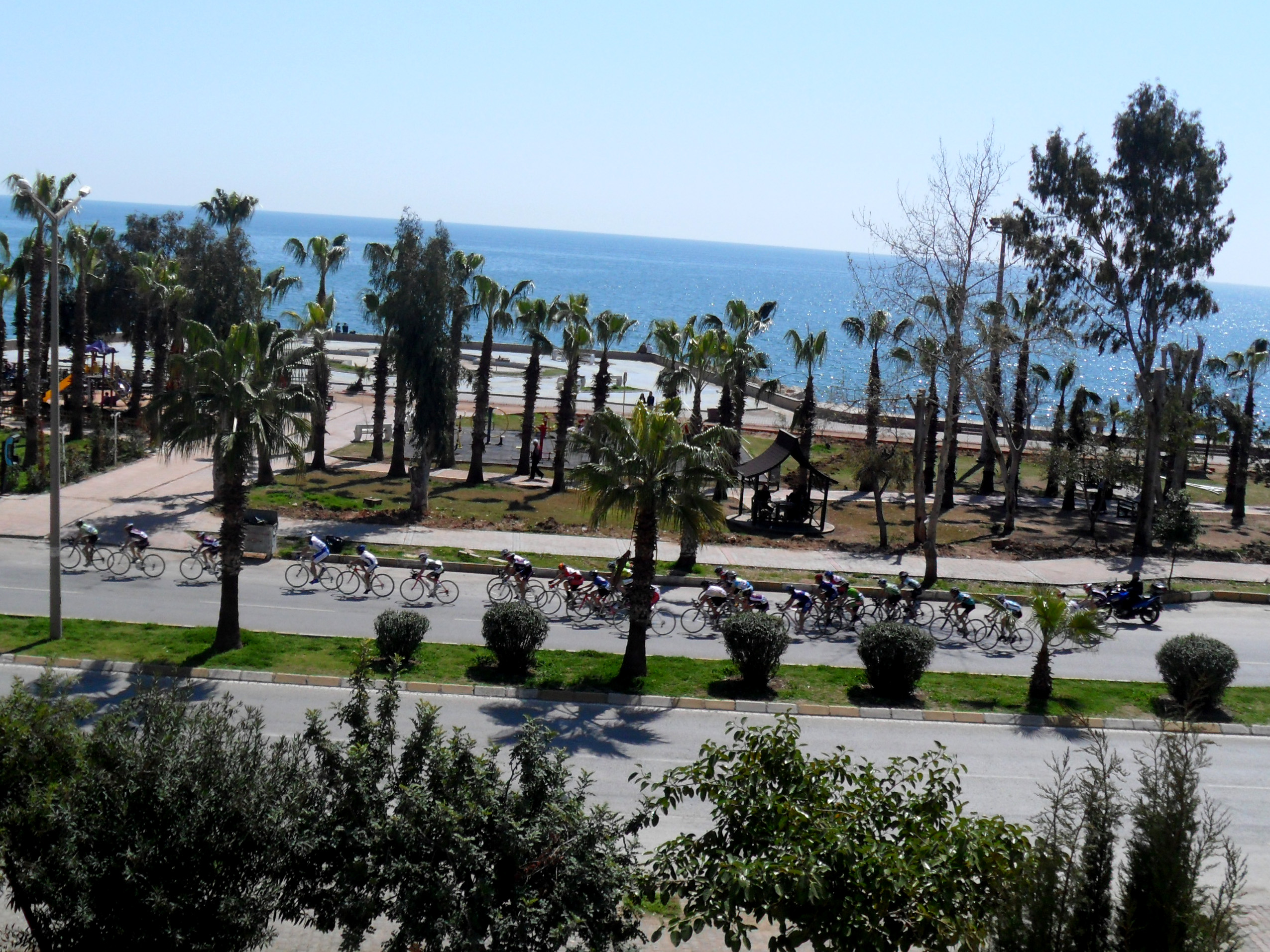

Mersin road cycling race (Turkish: KAP Mersin) was held on 23-25 March 2012 in Mersin city, Turkey, as the second lap of the national road race.

== Results ==
The team results for men were as follows

Team	Time
Kocaeli Brisa B	8.25.30
Kocaeli Brisa A	8.33.17
Konya Torku Şeker	8.34.59
Salcana Arnavutköy	8.37.21
Ege Pedal	9.04.17

The only team qualified for women was Zeytinli Belediyesi (5.17.01).
