= Vladimir Kerkez =

Slovenian cyclist

Personal information
- Born: 1 March 1984 (age 42) Kranj, Slovenia

Cycling career
- Sport: Cycling
- Discipline: Road
- Role: Rider

Professional teams
- 2004–2012: Sava Kranj
- 2017: Attaque Team Gusto

Vladimir Kerkez (born 1 March 1984 in Kranj) is a Slovenian former professional cyclist.

== Major results ==
=== Road ===
2007
2nd Overall The Paths of King Nikola

1st Stage 2

2nd Overall Giro del Friuli Venezia Giulia

1st Stage 4

2008
2nd Overall Tour de Hongrie
5th Overall The Paths of King Nikola
2009
1st Stage 2 The Paths of King Nikola
1st Banja Luka–Belgrade II
2010
1st Grand Prix Šenčur
2011
4th Tour of Vojvodina I
10th GP Kranj

=== Cyclo-cross ===
2016-2017
1st National Cyclo-cross championships
