= Biciklistički Klub Partizan =

Cycling Club

- Founded: 1947
- Colors
- Website: http://www.bk-partizan.rs/

Biciklistički Klub Partizan is a cycling club from Belgrade, Serbia. The club is part of the sports society JSD Partizan. It is a member of the Cycling Federation of Serbia.

The club was founded in 1947.

Members of the club participate in many national and international tournaments. In recent years the club has pushed to improving to compete with the best in Europe. Attempts to improve have borne fruit, the result being the victory in an international cycling tournament in Moscow.

== Notable players ==
- Saša Gajičić, won 8th place in world, two time national champion
- Aleksandar Nikačević - won 7th place in world, two time national champion
- Nebojša Jovanović - won 6th in Europe, winner of Greek tour
- Veselin Petrović - got 15th place at the Olympics, winner of a number of tournaments
