= Tour of Alanya =

Race details
- Date: October–November
- Region: Alanya, Antalya Province, Turkey
- Local name(s): Uluslararası Alanya Bisiklet Turu
- Discipline: Road
- Competition: UCI Europe Tour
- Type: Stage race
- Organiser: Turkish Cycling Federation

History
- First edition: 2010
- Editions: 2 (as of July 2012)
- First winner: Nikias Arndt (GER)
- Most recent: Gabor Kasza (SRB)

Tour of Alanya

The Tour of Alanya (Turkish: Uluslararası Alanya Bisiklet Turu) is an international road cycling race organized by the Turkish Cycling Federation at Alanya, Antalya Province in southern Turkey. It is part of the UCI Europe Tour having a rating of 2.2.

It was first held in 2010 between November 4–7, at which 70 racers of ten international teams competed in four categories. The tour consists of four stages in a total of 440 km (270 mi).

== Winners ==
Year	Country	Rider	Team
2010	Germany	Nikias Arndt	LKT Team Brandenburg Germany
2011	Serbia	Gabor Kasza	Manisaspor Turkey
