= 2012 national road cycling championships =

The 2012 national road cycling championships began in New Zealand with the time trial event (both men and women) on January 6. On January 7 the Women's Road Race.

== Jerseys ==
The winner of each national championship wears the national jersey in all their races for the next year in the respective discipline, apart from the World Championships and the Olympics, or unless they are wearing a category leader's jersey in a stage race. Most national champion jerseys tend to represent a country's flag or use the colours from it. Jerseys may also feature traditional sporting colours of a country that are not derived from a national flag, such as the National colours of Australia on the jerseys of Australian national champions.

== 2012 champions ==
=== Men's Elite ===
Country	Men's Elite Road Race Champion	Champion's Current Team	Men's Elite Time Trial Champion	Champion's Current Team
Albania	Eugert Zhupa		Eugert Zhupa	
Algeria	Azzedine Lagab	Groupement Sportif Petrolier Algérie	Azzedine Lagab	Groupement Sportif Petrolier Algérie
Andorra			David Albós	Agrupació Ciclista Andorrana
Angola	Igor Silva		Igor Silva	
Antigua and Barbuda	Jyme Bridges	Rattlers	Robert Marsh	Club Savoy
Argentina	Juan Pablo Dotti	Circunvalación en San Juan	Ignacio Pereyra	Asociación Ciclista Santiagueña
Aruba	George Winterdal		Gino Hodge	
Australia	Simon Gerrans	GreenEDGE	Luke Durbridge	GreenEDGE
Austria	Lukas Pöstlberger	RC Arbö–Wels–Gourmetfein	Riccardo Zoidl	RC Arbö–Wels–Gourmetfein
Azerbaijan	Oleksandr Surutkovych	Team Specialized Concept Store	Elchin Asadov	Team Specialized Concept Store
Bahamas	Anthony Colebrook		Spencer Deleveaux	
Barbados	Mario Forde		Russell Elcock	
Belarus	Yauheni Hutarovich	FDJ–BigMat	Branislau Samoilau	Movistar Team
Belgium	Tom Boonen	Omega Pharma–Quick-Step	Kristof Vandewalle	Omega Pharma–Quick-Step
Belize	Roger Troyer		Byron Pope	
Bermuda	Dominique Mayho	Madison	Dominique Mayho	Madison
Bolivia	Horacio Gallardo		Óscar Soliz	Movistar Continental Team
Bosnia and Herzegovina	Vladimir Kuvalja			
Botswana	Bernardo Ayuso		Bernardo Ayuso	
Brazil	Otávio Bulgarelli	Funvic-Pindamonhangaba	Luiz Carlos Amorim	Real Cycling Team
British Virgin Islands	Philippe Leroy (Note: Leroy finished second to Antigua & Barbuda's Lynn Murray.)		Philippe Leroy (Note: Leroy finished second to Saint Vincent and the Grenadines rider Orano Andrews.)	
Brunei				
Bulgaria	Danail Petrov	Caja Rural	Nikolay Mihaylov	CCC–Polkowice
Burkina Faso	Rasmane Ouedraogo			
Canada	Ryan Roth	SpiderTech–C10	Svein Tuft	Orica–GreenEDGE
Cayman Islands	Michele Smith		Steve Abbott	
Chile	Carlos Oyarzun	Triciclo-USM	Carlos Oyarzun	Triciclo-USM
China	Xu Gang	Champion System	Xue Mingxing	Max Success Sports
Colombia	Félix Cárdenas		Iván Casas	
Democratic Republic of the Congo	Enock Manzambi			
Republic of the Congo				
Costa Rica	Pablo Mudarra		Rodolfo Villalobos	
Ivory Coast	Porolohi Soro			
Croatia	Vladimir Miholjević	Acqua & Sapone	Vladimir Miholjević	Acqua & Sapone
Cuba	Pedro Sibila			
Curaçao	Marc de Maar	UnitedHealthcare	Marc de Maar	UnitedHealthcare
Cyprus	Vassilis Adamou		Marios Athanasiadis	
Czech Republic	Milan Kadlec	ASC Dukla Praha	Jan Bárta	Team NetApp
Denmark	Sebastian Lander	Glud & Marstrand–LRØ	Jakob Fuglsang	RadioShack–Nissan
Dominican Republic	Braulio García			
Ecuador				
El Salvador	Jimmy López		Jimmy López	
Eritrea	Daniel Teklehaymanot	Orica–GreenEDGE	Daniel Teklehaymanot	Orica–GreenEDGE
Estonia	Tanel Kangert	Astana	Rein Taaramäe	Cofidis
Finland	Jarkko Niemi	Koiviston Isku	Matti Helminen	Landbouwkrediet–Euphony
France	Nacer Bouhanni	FDJ–BigMat	Sylvain Chavanel	Omega Pharma–Quick-Step
Gabon	Frédéric Obiang		Frédéric Obiang	
Georgia	Giorgi Nadiradze		Giorgi Nadiradze	
Germany	Fabian Wegmann	Garmin–Barracuda	Tony Martin	Omega Pharma–Quick-Step
Greece	Ioannis Drakakis		Ioannis Tamouridis	SP Tableware
Guatemala	Mario Archila	Coca-Cola	Manuel Rodas	Cable DX-Decorabaños
Guyana	Orville Hinds		Jude Bentley	
Hong Kong	Kwok Ho Ting			
Hungary	Péter Kusztor	Atlas Personal–Jakroo	Gábor Fejes	Bátorfi AKTK
Iceland	David Sigurdsson		Hakon Sigurdsson	
Iran	Hossein Alizadeh	Tabriz Petrochemical Cycling Team	Alireza Haghi	Azad University Cross Team
Ireland	Matt Brammeier	Omega Pharma–Quick-Step	Michael Hutchinson	In Gear Quikvit
Israel	Oleg Sergeev		Anton Mikailov	
Italy	Franco Pellizotti	Androni Giocattoli–Venezuela	Dario Cataldo	Omega Pharma–Quick-Step
Jamaica	Linford Blackwood		Peter Thompson	
Japan	Yukihiro Doi	Argos–Shimano	Ryota Nishizono	Bridgestone-Anchor
Kazakhstan	Assan Bazayev	Astana	Dmitriy Gruzdev	Astana
Kyrgyzstan	Evgeny Vakker	Uzbekistan Suren Team	Evgeny Vakker	Uzbekistan Suren Team
Latvia	Aleksejs Saramotins	Cofidis	Gatis Smukulis	Team Katusha
Lebanon	Nabil Tabbal		Zaher el Hage	
Lesotho				
Liechtenstein	Daniel Rinner (Note: Rinner finished second to Swiss rider Yves Covi.)	Team Vorarlberg	Karlheinz Risch	
Lithuania	Gediminas Bagdonas	An Post–Sean Kelly	Ramūnas Navardauskas	Garmin–Barracuda
Luxembourg	Laurent Didier	RadioShack–Nissan	Ben Gastauer (Note: Although Bob Jungels recorded the best time for the time trial, he was eligible for Under-23 honours only.)	Ag2r–La Mondiale
Macedonia	Stefan Petrovski		Joze Jovanov	
Madagascar	Jean Rakotondrasoa		Jean Rakotondrasoa	
Malawi				
Malaysia	Mohamed Zamri Salleh	Terengganu Pro Asia Cycling Team	Mohamed Azman Zulkifli	
Mali	Oumar Sangare			
Malta	Maurice Formosa			
Mauritius	Matthieu Leblanc	VVJCC	Yannick Lincoln	
Mongolia				
Moldova	Alexandre Pliușchin	Leopard-Trek Continental Team	Sergiu Cioban	Tușnad Cycling Team
Morocco	Tarik Chaoufi	MT	Mouhssine Lahsaini	FUS de Rabat
Mexico	Luis Enrique Lemus	Jelly Belly	Bernardo Colex	Arenas Tlax-Mex
Namibia	Lotto Petrus	MTN–Qhubeka	Lotto Petrus	MTN–Qhubeka
Netherlands	Niki Terpstra	Omega Pharma–Quick-Step	Lieuwe Westra	Vacansoleil–DCM
New Zealand	James Williamson (Note: Williamson finished second overall behind Michael Vink, but Vink was ineligible for the senior event, as he was in contention for Under-23 honours only.)	PureBlack Racing	Paul Odlin	Subway Pro Cycling
Nicaragua	Alvaro Baltodano		Walter Gaitán	
Norway	Edvald Boasson Hagen	Team Sky	Reidar Borgersen	Joker–Merida
Panama	José Rodriguez		Ramón Carretero	Movistar Continental Team
Pakistan				
Paraguay	cancelled (Note: The road race championships were cancelled after a local female cyclist was killed.)		Oscar Santos	
Peru	Cesar Mucha		Alexy Limaylla	
Poland	Michał Gołaś	Omega Pharma–Quick-Step	Maciej Bodnar	Liquigas–Cannondale
Portugal	Manuel Antonio Cardoso	Caja Rural	José Gonçalves	Onda
Puerto Rico	Edgardo Richiez (Note: Richiez finished second to Mexico's Marco Ortega in the event.)		Edgardo Richiez	
Romania	Zoltan Sipos	Mazicon	Andrei Nechita	
Russia	Eduard Vorganov	Team Katusha	Denis Menchov	Team Katusha
Rwanda	Adrien Niyonshuti	MTN–Qhubeka		
Saint Lucia	Fidel Mangal			
Saint Vincent and the Grenadines				
Saint Kitts and Nevis	Assim Chapman		Reggie Douglas (Note: Douglas finished second to France's Patricio Carty in the time trial.)	
Serbia	Nikola Kozomara		Ivan Stević	Salcano–Arnavutkoy
Singapore	Darren Low	OCBC Singapore Continental Cycling Team	Junaidi Bin Hashim (Note: Bin Hashim finished second to Netherlands' Tjarco Cuppens in the time trial.)	OCBC Singapore Continental Cycling Team
Slovakia	Peter Sagan	Liquigas–Cannondale	Peter Velits	Omega Pharma–Quick-Step
Slovenia	Borut Božič	Astana	Robert Vrečer	Team Vorarlberg
South Africa	Robert Hunter	Garmin–Barracuda	Reinardt Janse van Rensburg	MTN–Qhubeka
South Korea	Jang Chan-Jae	Terengganu Pro Asia Cycling Team		
Spain	Francisco Ventoso	Movistar Team	Luis León Sánchez	Rabobank
Suriname	Moses Rickets		Ruiz Ceder	
Sweden	Christopher Stevenson	Team UK Youth	Gustav Larsson	Vacansoleil–DCM
Switzerland	Martin Kohler	BMC Racing Team	Fabian Cancellara	RadioShack–Nissan
Taiwan	Wu Po-Hung	Team Senter–Merida	Lee Wei-Cheng	
Thailand				
Togo	Assion Ayivon			
Tunisia	Maher Hasnaoui	AS Militaire de Tunis		
Turkey	Miraç Kal	Konya–Torku Şekerspor	Eyüp Karagöbek	Brisaspor
Trinidad and Tobago	Troy Nelson		Jovian Gomez	
Uganda	Leone Matovu			
Ukraine	Andriy Hryvko	Astana	Andriy Hryvko	Astana
United Kingdom	Ian Stannard	Team Sky	Alex Dowsett	Team Sky
United Arab Emirates	Badr Banihammad		Yousif Banihammad	
Uruguay	Emanuel Yanes	C.C. Porongos	Jorge Soto	C.C. Porongos
United States	Timmy Duggan	Liquigas–Cannondale	David Zabriskie	Garmin–Barracuda
United States Virgin Islands	Mark Defour		Glenn Massiah	
Uzbekistan	Sergey Lagutin	Vacansoleil–DCM	Muradjan Halmuratov	
Venezuela	Miguel Ubeto (Note: Ubeto finished second behind Xavier Quevedo, but Quevedo was only eligible for Under-23 honours.)	Androni Giocattoli–Venezuela	Tomás Gil	Androni Giocattoli–Venezuela
Zimbabwe				

=== Women's ===
Country	Women's Elite Road Race Champion	Champion's Current Team	Women's Elite Time Trial Champion	Champion's Current Team
Albania				
Algeria				
Angola				
Antigua and Barbuda			Tamiko Butler	Team Terminex
Argentina				
Australia	Amanda Spratt	GreenEDGE–AIS	Shara Gillow	GreenEDGE–AIS
Austria			Christiane Soeder	ARBÖ Radteam Vitalogic Niederösterreich
Bahamas				
Barbados				
Belarus				
Belgium	Jolien D'Hoore	Topsport Vlaanderen–Ridley 2012	Liesbet De Vocht	Rabobank Women Team
Belize				
Bermuda				
Bolivia				
Brazil				
British Virgin Islands				
Brunei				
Bulgaria				
Burkina Faso				
Canada				
Cayman Islands				
Chile				
China				
Colombia				
Republic of the Congo				
Costa Rica				
Ivory Coast				
Croatia				
Cuba				
Curaçao				
Cyprus				
Czech Republic				
Denmark	Cathrine Grage	Hvidovre CK	Cathrine Grage	Hvidovre CK
Ecuador				
El Salvador				
Estonia				
Eritrea				
France				
Finland	Lotta Lepistö	Porin Tarmo	Anne Palm	Cycle Club Helsinki
Germany	Judith Arndt	Orica–AIS	Judith Arndt	Orica–AIS
Greece				
Guatemala				
Guyana				
Hong Kong				
Hungary				
Georgia				
Iceland				
Iran				
Ireland				
Israel				
Italy				
Jamaica				
Japan				
Kazakhstan				
Kyrgyzstan				
Latvia				
Lebanon				
Liechtenstein				
Lesotho				
Lithuania	Inga Čilvinaitė	Diadora–Pasta Zara	Vilija Sereikaitė	
Luxembourg				
Macedonia				
Madagascar				
Malawi				
Malaysia				
Mali				
Malta				
Mauritius				
Mongolia				
Moldova				
Morocco				
Mexico				
Namibia	Vera Adrian		Vera Adrian	
Netherlands	Annemiek van Vleuten	Rabobank Women Team	Ellen van Dijk	Team Specialized–lululemon
New Zealand	Nicky Samuels	BikeNZ	Lauren Ellis	BikeNZ
Norway			Lise Hafsø Nøstvold	SK Sandnes
Panama				
Pakistan				
Peru				
Poland				
Portugal				
Puerto Rico				
Romania				
Russia				
Rwanda				
Saint Lucia				
Saint Vincent and the Grenadines				
Saint Kitts and Nevis				
Serbia				
Singapore				
Slovakia				
Slovenia			Tjaša Rutar	Polet Garmin
South Africa	Ashleigh Moolman	Lotto–Belisol Ladies	Cherise Taylor	Lotto–Belisol Ladies
South Korea				
Spain	Anna Sanchís	Bizkaia–Durango	Anna Sanchís	Bizkaia–Durango
Suriname				
Sweden	Emma Johansson	Hitec Products–Mistral Home	Emma Johansson	Hitec Products–Mistral Home
Switzerland				
Taiwan				
Thailand				
Tunisia				
Turkey	Semra Yetiş	Brisaspor	Merve Tayfun Marmara	Brisaspor
Trinidad and Tobago				
Ukraine				
United Kingdom	Sharon Laws	AA Drink–leontien.nl	Wendy Houvenaghel	Bike Chain Ricci
United Arab Emirates				
United States	Megan Guarnier	Team TIBCO–To The Top	Amber Neben	Team Specialized–lululemon
Uzbekistan				
Venezuela				
Zimbabwe				
