= Onur Balkan =

Turkish cyclist (born 1996)

Personal information
- Born: 10 March 1996 (age 30) İzmit, Turkey
- Height: 1.77 m (5 ft 10 in)
- Weight: 69 kg (152 lb)

Cycling career
- Sport: Cycling
- Current team: Suspended
- Discipline: Road
- Role: Rider
- Rider type: Sprinter

Amateur team
- 2015–2017: Kocaeli Brisaspor

Professional teams
- 2018: Torku Şekerspor
- 2019–2022: Salcano–Sakarya BB Team

Onur Balkan (born 10 March 1996) is a Turkish cyclist, who is currently suspended from competition.

== Doping ==
On 11 May 2022 Balkan returned an adverse analytical sample for EPO and was provisionally suspended until 2025.

== Major results ==
2013
National Junior Road Championships

1st Road race
1st Time trial

2014
National Junior Road Championships

1st Road race
2nd Time trial

2015
Tour of Ankara

1st Points classification
1st Stages 2 & 3

2nd Overall Tour of Black Sea

1st Points classification
1st Stage 2

3rd Overall Tour of Çanakkale

1st Points classification
1st Stage 1

4th Overall Tour of Mersin

1st Stage 2

5th Time trial, National Road Championships
6th Overall Tour of Aegean

1st Stage 2

8th Overall International Tour of Torku Mevlana

1st Mountains classification

2016
National Road Championships

1st Road race
5th Time trial

1st Stage 2 Tour du Maroc
2017
National Road Championships

1st Road race
3rd Time trial

1st Turkish Beauties classification Presidential Tour of Turkey
2018
National Road Championships

1st Road race
7th Time trial

1st Overall Tour of Mediterrennean

1st Stages 2 & 3

1st Overall Tour of Mevlana
1st Turkish Beauties classification Presidential Tour of Turkey
1st Stage 9 Tour of Qinghai Lake
1st Stage 3 Tour of Cappadocia
2nd Overall Tour of Cartier

1st Points classification

2nd Overall Tour of Romania

1st Young rider classification
1st Stage 5

2nd Grand Prix Alanya
5th Overall Tour of Mesopotamia

1st Points classification
1st Stage 4

5th Overall Tour of Mersin
2019
1st Overall Tour of Black Sea

1st Points classification
1st Stages 2 & 3

1st Overall Tour of Kayseri

1st Stage 2

1st Grand Prix Justiniano Hotels
1st Tour de Ribas
1st Bursa Orhangazi Race
1st Grand Prix Velo Erciyes
1st Fatih Sultan Mehmet Edirne Race
1st Stage 3 Tour of Mesopotamia
National Road Championships

2nd Road race
2nd Time trial

2nd Overall Tour of Central Anatolia

1st Stage 2

2nd Minsk Cup
2nd Grand Prix Erciyes
2nd Grand Prix Velo Alanya
3rd Overall Tour of Mevlana
3rd Bursa Yıldırım Bayezıt Race
5th Horizon Park Race for Peace
7th Grand Prix Alanya
7th Fatih Sultan Mehmet Kirklareli Race
9th Overall Tour de Tochigi
2020
1st Road race, National Road Championships
2nd GP Belek
3rd Grand Prix Alanya
3rd GP Manavgat
5th GP Antalya
2021
1st Road race, National Road Championships
1st GP Mediterrennean
5th GP Manavgat
2022
1st Grand Prix Gazipaşa
1st Stage 5 Tour of Sharjah
5th Grand Prix Justiniano Hotels
