= Brisaspor =

Turkish cycling team

Team information
- Registered: Turkey
- Founded: 1982 (men); 2001 (women); 2005 (mountainbike)
- Disciplines: Road, mountain
- Bicycles: Colnago (road); Salcano (mountainbike)

Team name history
- Lassaspor (1982-1999)

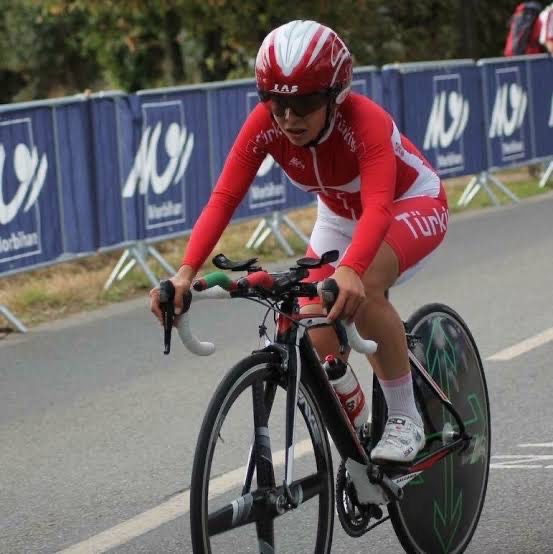
Cansu Celebi during 2014 UEC Road EU Championship, St.Wendel/Germany

Brisaspor is a Turkish professional road bicycle racing team based in Kocaeli, and sponsored by the local Brisa Bridgestone Sabancı Lastik company of Turkish Sabancı Group, which produces and distributes Bridgestone tires from Japan. The cycling team is part of the Brisaspor Club.

Preparations to form a cycling team goes back to 1978, when a summer camp was opened to build infrastructure. The team was officially established in 1982 with the twelve sportspeople from the summer camp as Lassaspor, which was sponsored by the Turkish Lassa company that is the main facility for the production of both tire brands.

Already in 1983, the team became Turkish champion. In 1999, Brisaspor began to participate at competitions of international level. It is the first champion of the Presidential Cycling Tour of Turkey. Between 2001 and 2007, Brisa became seven consecutive times champion of the Tour of Turkey. In 2001, women cycling team was formed. From 2005 on, the club took part in mountain biking (MTB) competitions.

Team member Bilal Akgül became the first ever Turkish Olympian cyclist participating at the mountain biking event of 2008 Summer Olympics. Kemal Küçükbay took part at the men's road race event of 2012 Summer Olympics. Team member Onur Balkan qualified for participation in the road race event at the 2016 Summer Olympics.

Brisaspor consists of 28 sportspeople, five technical staff, twelve senior men, seven junior men and four women.

== Team roster ==
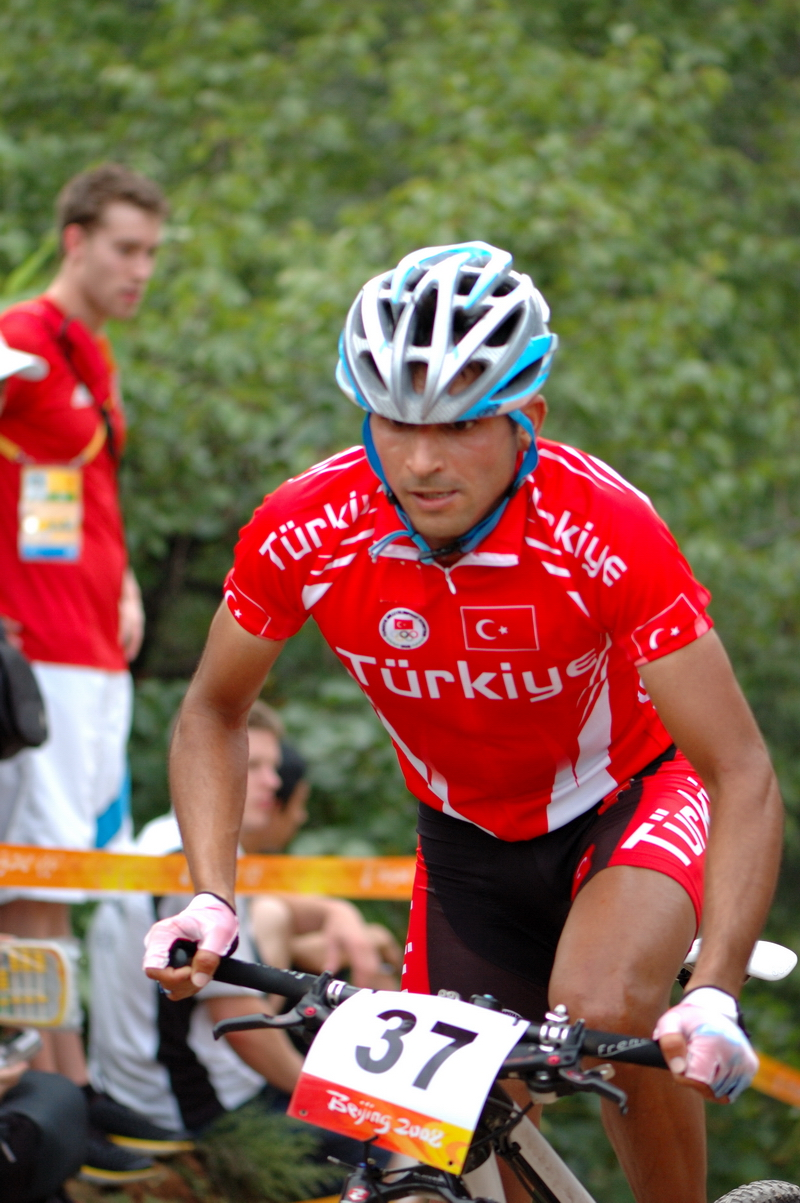
Bilal Akgül during the 2008 Summer Olympics in Beijing

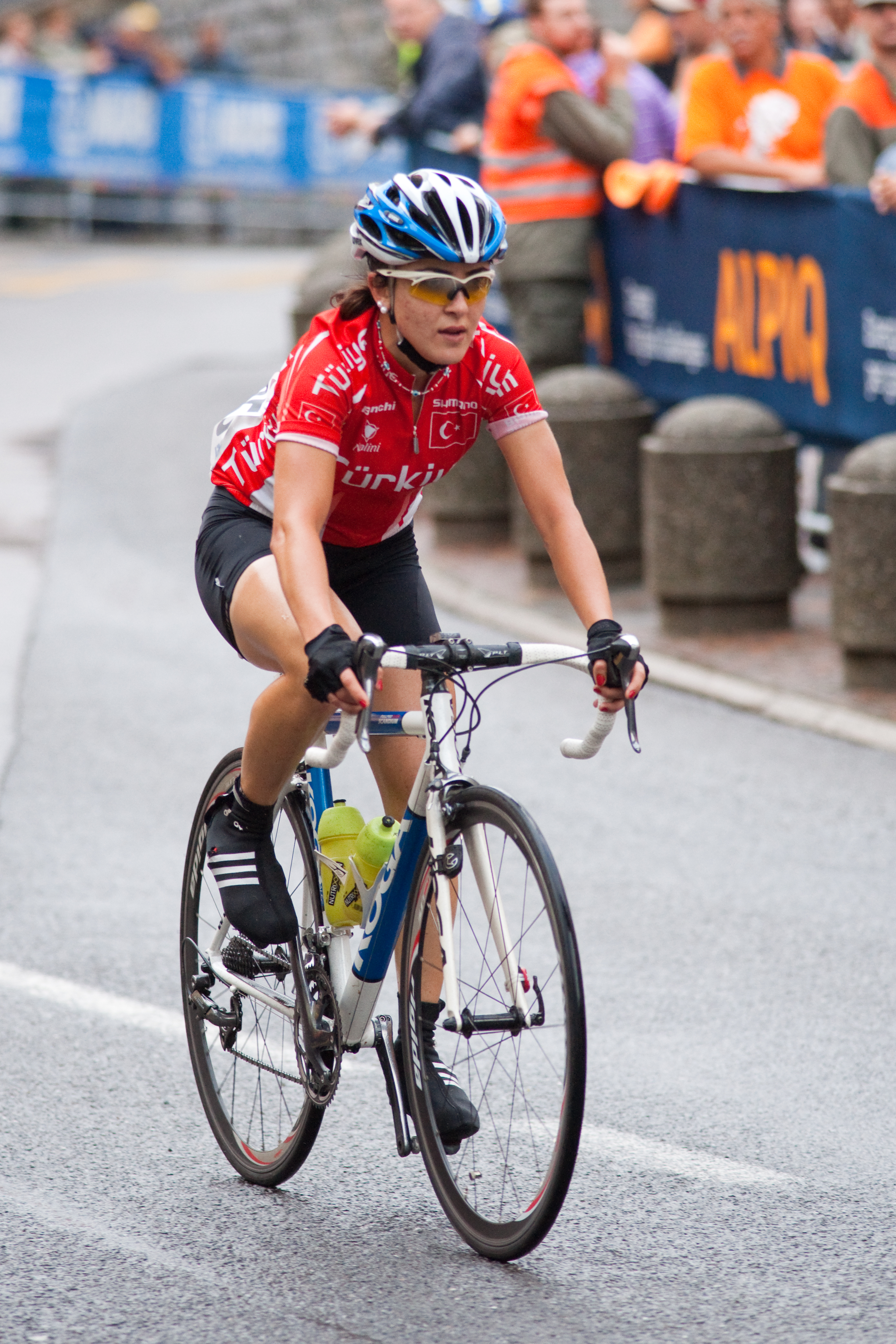
Semra Yetiş during the 2009 UCI Road World Championships in Mendrisio

As of July 2016.

- G.Manager: Nadir Yavuz
- Coach: Mert Mutlu

=== Senior men's ===
Rider	Date of birth
Aleksandar Aleksiev (BUL)
Onur Balkan (TUR)	March 10, 1996 (age 30)
Gökhan Hasta (TUR)
Stefan Histrov (BUL)	July 12, 1985 (age 41)
Turgut Kafes (TUR)
Adil Kurkut (TUR)

Rider	Date of birth
Kemal Küçükbay (TUR)	August 23, 1982 (age 44)
Uğur Marmara (TUR)
Ali Rıza Tanrıverdi (TUR)
Lütfullah Tanrıverdi (TUR)
Recep Ünalan (TUR)	April 9, 1985 (age 41)

=== MTB men's ===
Rider	Date of birth
Bilal Akgül (TUR)	October 13, 1982 (age 43)
Halil İbrahim Doğan (TUR)
Sinan İli (TUR)

Rider	Date of birth
Abdülkadir Kelleci (TUR)
Mustafa Köklü (TUR)
Yunus Emre Yılmaz (TUR)

=== Women's ===
Rider	Date of birth
Ebru C. Andaş (TUR)
Beyza Kahveci (TUR)
Merve Tayfun Marmara (TUR)

Rider	Date of birth
Cansu Celebi (TUR)
Ece Yıldırım (TUR)

== Major wins ==
1999
Overall Tour of Mevlana, Mert Mutlu

2000
Overall Tour of Mevlana, Mert Mutlu

2001
Overall Presidential Cycling Tour of Turkey, Mert Mutlu

2003
Overall Presidential Cycling Tour of Turkey, Mert Mutlu

Stage 5, Mert Mutlu

2005
Overall Presidential Cycling Tour of Turkey

Stage 3, Mert Mutlu

2009
OverallTour du Maroc, Alexandr Dymovskikh

Stage 3, Alexandr Dymovskikh

2010
Overall Tour of Marmara, Kemal Küçükbay
Stage 1 Tour of Marmara, Mert Mutlu

2011
Overall Tour of Trakya, Kemal Küçükbay

Stage 3, Kemal Küçükbay

Overall Cappadocia, Mert Mutlu

Stage 1, Mert Mutlu

Overall Tour of Victory, Nazim Bakırcı

Stage 3, Nazim Bakırcı

2012
Overall Grand Prix Dobrich II, Stefan Hristov

2013
Tour of Bulgaria

Stage 2, Stefan Hristov

Overall Tour of Szeklerland, Georgi Petrov Georgiev

Stages 2, Georgi Petrov Georgiev

2014
Overall Tour of Szeklerland, Stefan Hristov

Stages 2 & 3a (ITT), Stefan Hristov

2015
Tour of Ankara

Points classification, Onur Balkan
Stages 2 & 3, Onur Balkan

Stage 2 Tour of Aegean, Onur Balkan
Black Sea Cycling Tour

Points classification, Onur Balkan
Stage 2, Onur Balkan

Tour of Çanakkale

Points classification, Onur Balkan
Stage 1, Onur Balkan

Stage 2 Tour of Mersin, Onur Balkan
Mountains classification International Tour of Torku Mevlana, Onur Balkan
Overall Tour of Bulgaria, Stefan Hristov

Stage 2, Stefan Hristov

2016
Stage 2 Tour du Maroc, Onur Balkan
Tour de Serbie

Mountains classification, Stefan Hristov
Stage 2, Georgi Petrov Georgiev

== National champions ==
2005
Turkey Road Race Championships, Kemal Küçükbay

2006
Turkey Road Race Championships, Bilal Akgül
Turkey U23 Road Race Championships, Recep Ünalan

2007
Turkey Road Race Championships, Uğur Marmara
Turkey U23 Road Race Championships, Recep Ünalan

2008
Turkey Road Race Championships, Orhan Şahin
Turkey Time Trial Championships, Kemal Küçükbay
Turkey U23 Road Race Championships, Recep Ünalan

2009
Turkey Time Trial Championships, Muhammet Eyüp Karagöbek

2010
Turkey Road Race Championships, Behçet Usta
Turkey Time Trial Championships, Kemal Küçükbay

2011
Turkey Road Race Championships, Kemal Küçükbay
Turkey Time Trial Championships, Mert Mutlu

2012
Turkey Time Trial Championships, Muhammet Eyüp Karagöbek
Turkey Women Road Race Championships, Semra Yetiş
Turkey Women Time Trial Championships, Merve Tayfun Marmara
Turkey U23 Road Race Championships, Lütfullah Tanrıverdi

2013
Turkey U23 Road Race Championships, Onur Balkan
Turkey U23 Time Trial Championships, Onur Balkan

2014
Bulgaria National Time Trial Championships, Stefan Hristov
Turkey Women Time Trial Championships, Cansu Celebi
Turkey U23 Road Race Championships, Onur Balkan

2016
Turkey Road Race Championships, Onur Balkan
Bulgaria Road Race Championships, Georgi Georgiev
