= Muhammet Atalay =

Turkish cyclist (born 1989)

Personal information
- Full name: Muhammet Atalay
- Born: 15 May 1989 (age 37)

Cycling career
- Sport: Cycling
- Current team: Spor Toto Cycling Team
- Discipline: Road
- Role: Rider (retired); Directeur sportif

Professional teams
- 2011–2018: Konya–Şekerspor–Torku–Vivelo
- 2019: Salcano–Sakarya BB Team

Managerial team
- 2021–: Spor Toto Cycling Team

Muhammet Atalay (born 15 May 1989) is a Turkish former professional cyclist, who currently works as a directeur sportif for UCI Continental team Spor Toto Cycling Team.

== Major results ==
2011
1st Stage 4 Tour of Trakya
2013
3rd Time trial, National Road Championships
2015
3rd Overall Tour of Black Sea
9th Overall International Tour of Torku Mevlana
2016
4th Overall Tour of Ankara
2018
National Road Championships

2nd Road race
2nd Time trial

2019
3rd GP Sakia El Hamra, Les Challenges de la Marche Verte
