= Feritcan Şamlı =

Turkish cyclist (born 1994)

Personal information
- Full name: Feritcan Şamlı
- Born: 29 January 1994 (age 32) Istanbul, Turkey

Cycling career
- Sport: Cycling
- Current team: Spor Toto Cycling Team
- Discipline: Road
- Role: Rider

Amateur team
- 2011–2013: Kocaeli–Brisaspor

Professional teams
- 2014–2018: Torku Şekerspor
- 2019: Salcano–Sakarya BB Team
- 2020–: Spor Toto Cycling Team

Feritcan Şamlı (born 29 January 1994) is a Turkish cyclist, who currently rides for UCI Continental team Spor Toto Cycling Team.

== Major results ==
2011
1st Time trial, National Junior Road Championships
2012
1st Time trial, National Under-23 Road Championships
2013
3rd Time trial, National Road Championships
2014
1st Road race, National Road Championships
2015
2nd Overall Tour of Aegean
5th Overall Tour of Ankara

1st Stage 4

8th Overall Tour of Çanakkale
2016
2nd Time trial, National Road Championships
9th Overall Tour of Ankara

1st Stage 1 (ITT)

2017
2nd Time trial, National Road Championships
2018
3rd Time trial, National Road Championships
2019
1st Turkish Beauties classification Presidential Tour of Turkey
4th Road race, National Road Championships
2020
5th Time trial, National Road Championships
5th GP Manavgat
