= Recep Ünalan =

Turkish track & road cyclist (born 1990)

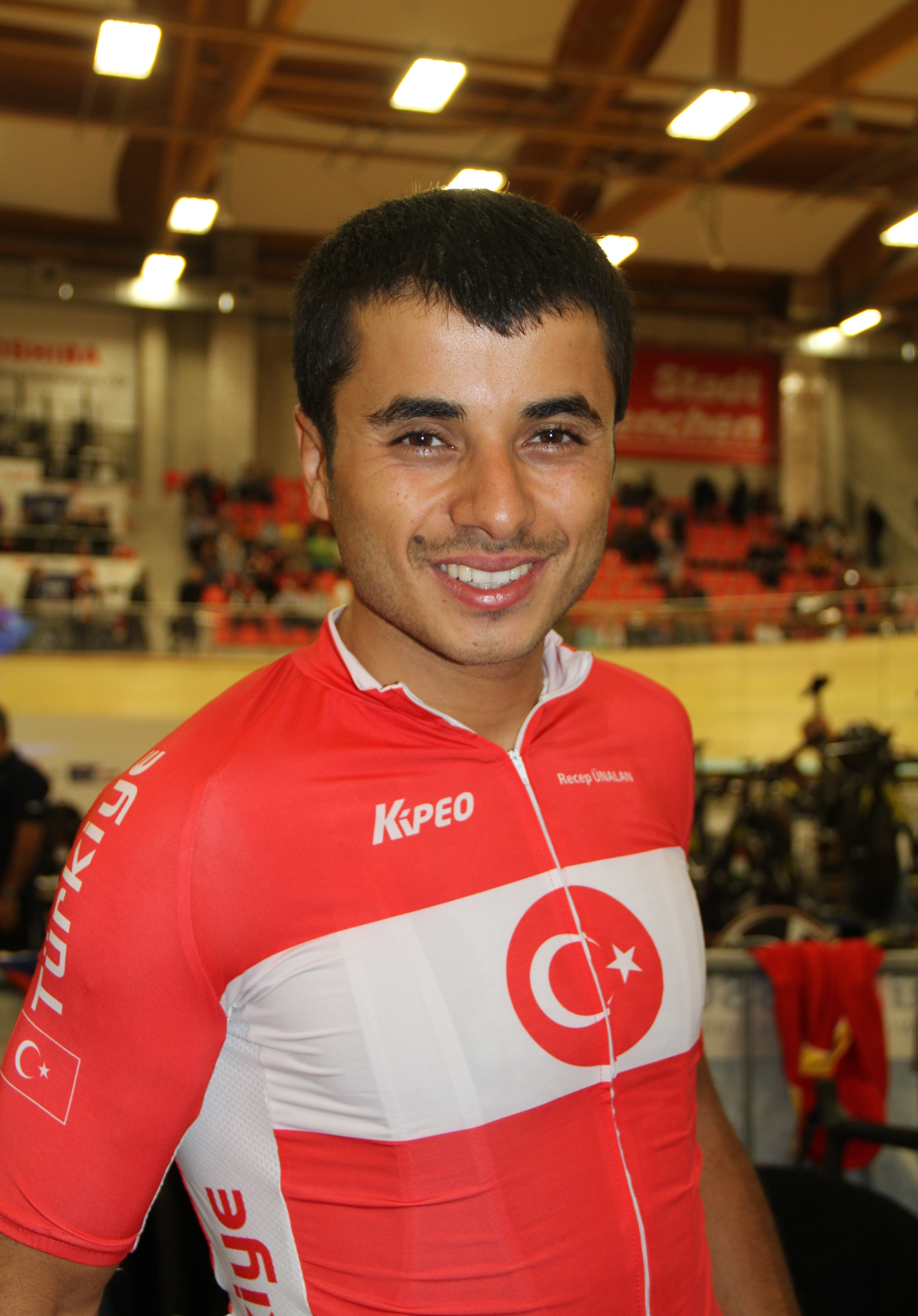
- Ünalan at the 2015 UEC European Track Championships

Personal information
- Full name: Recep Ünalan
- Born: 9 April 1990 (age 36) Kayseri, Turkey

Cycling career
- Sport: Cycling
- Current team: Retired
- Disciplines: Road; Track
- Role: Rider
- Rider type: All-rounder

Amateur teams
- 2010–2011: World Cycling Centre
- 2012–2013: Salcano Arnavutköy
- 2013–2015: Kocaeli Brisaspor
- 2016–2017: Salcano Kapadokya BSK

Professional team
- 2011–2012: Manisaspor

Recep Ünalan (born 9 April 1990 in Kayseri, Turkey) is a Turkish former cyclist, who was the junior Turkish National Road Race Championships winner in 2006, 2007 and 2008. He competed at the 2010 UCI Road World Championships in Melbourne.

== Major results ==
2006
1st Road race, National Junior Road Championships
2007
1st Road race, National Junior Road Championships
2008
1st Road race, National Junior Road Championships
2011
1st Overall Tour of Gallipoli

1st Stages 2 & 3

9th Overall Tour of Isparta

1st Stage 3

10th ZLM Tour
2012
9th Overall Tour of Trakya
2013
1st Road race, Balkan Road Championships
4th Classic Beograd–Čačak
2015
5th Overall Tour of Çanakkale

1st Stage 2

5th Overall Tour of Aegean
2016
National Road Championships

3rd Road race
4th Time trial
