= 2022 Presidential Tour of Turkey =

Cycling race

2022 UCI ProSeries 2022 UCI Europe Tour, race 19 of 53

Race details
- Dates: 10–17 April 2022
- Stages: ~~8~~ 7
- Distance: 1,167.5 km (725.5 mi)
- Winning time: 27h 33' 10"

Results
Jersey awarded to the overall winner	Winner	Patrick Bevin (NZL)	(Israel–Premier Tech)
	Second	Jay Vine (AUS)	(Alpecin–Fenix)
	Third	Eduardo Sepúlveda (ARG)	(Drone Hopper–Androni Giocattoli)
Jersey awarded to the points classification winner	Points	Jasper Philipsen (BEL)	(Alpecin–Fenix)
Jersey awarded to the mountains classification winner	Mountains	Noah Granigan (USA)	(Wildlife Generation Pro Cycling)
Jersey awarded to the sprints classification winner	Sprints	Batuhan Özgür (TUR)	(Sakarya BB Pro Team)
	Team	Equipo Kern Pharma	

The 2022 Presidential Tour of Turkey was a road cycling stage race held between 10 and 17 April 2022 in Turkey. It was the 57th edition of the Presidential Tour of Turkey.

== Teams ==
Six UCI WorldTeams, twelve UCI ProTeams and seven UCI Continental teams participated in the race.

UCI WorldTeams

- Astana Qazaqstan Team
- Bora–Hansgrohe
- Israel–Premier Tech
- Lotto–Soudal
- Team BikeExchange–Jayco
- Team DSM

UCI ProTeams

- Alpecin–Fenix
- Bardiani–CSF–Faizanè
- Burgos BH
- Caja Rural–Seguros RGA
- Drone Hopper–Androni Giocattoli
- Eolo–Kometa
- Equipo Kern Pharma
- Euskaltel–Euskadi
- Human Powered Health
- Arkéa–Samsic
- Team Novo Nordisk
- Uno-X Pro Cycling Team

UCI Continental Teams

- Bike Aid
- China Glory Continental Cycling Team
- Global 6 Cycling
- Sakarya BB Pro Team
- Saris Rouvy Sauerland Team
- Spor Toto Cycling Team
- Wildlife Generation Pro Cycling

== Route ==
The 2022 edition included eight stages covering 1,308.6 kilometres (813.1 mi) over eight days. Although only seven stages were raced due to the final stage being cancelled.

Stage characteristics and winners
Stage	Date	Course	Distance	Type	Stage winner
1	10 April	Bodrum to Kuşadası	207.6 km (129.0 mi)	Hilly stage	Caleb Ewan (AUS)
2	11 April	Selçuk to Alaçatı	154.4 km (95.9 mi)	Hilly stage	Kaden Groves (AUS)
3	12 April	Çeşme to İzmir	121.8 km (75.7 mi)	Hilly stage	Jasper Philipsen (BEL)
4	13 April	İzmir to Mount Sipylus	152.1 km (94.5 mi)	Mountain stage	Eduardo Sepúlveda (ARG)
5	14 April	Manisa to Ayvalık	191.7 km (119.1 mi)	Hilly stage	Sam Welsford (AUS)
6	15 April	Edremit, Balıkesir to Eceabat	204.6 km (127.1 mi)	Hilly stage	Caleb Ewan (AUS)
7	16 April	Gelibolu to Tekirdağ	135.3 km (84.1 mi)	Mountain stage	Patrick Bevin (NZL)
8	17 April	Istanbul to Istanbul	141.1 km (87.7 mi)	Intermediate stage	No winner (Note: The stage was cancelled after the stage was cancelled 25km in due to heavy rain.)
Total			~~1,308.6 km (813.1 mi)~~ 1,167.5 km (725.5 mi)		

== Stages ==
=== Stage 1 ===
10 April 2022 — Bodrum to Kuşadası, 207.6 km (129.0 mi)

Stage 1 Result
Rank	Rider	Team	Time
1	Caleb Ewan (AUS)	Lotto–Soudal	4h 38' 15"
2	Jasper Philipsen (BEL)	Alpecin–Fenix	+ 0"
3	Kaden Groves (AUS)	Team BikeExchange–Jayco	+ 0"
4	Danny van Poppel (NED)	Bora–Hansgrohe	+ 0"
5	Rick Zabel (GER)	Israel–Premier Tech	+ 0"
6	Cees Bol (NED)	Team DSM	+ 0"
7	Mirco Maestri (ITA)	Eolo–Kometa	+ 0"
8	Miguel Ángel Fernández (ESP)	Global 6 Cycling	+ 0"
9	Filippo Tagliani (ITA)	Drone Hopper–Androni Giocattoli	+ 0"
10	Carlos Canal (ESP)	Euskaltel–Euskadi	+ 0"

General classification after Stage 1
Rank	Rider	Team	Time
1	Caleb Ewan (AUS)	Lotto–Soudal	4h 38' 05"
2	Jasper Philipsen (BEL)	Alpecin–Fenix	+ 4"
3	Kaden Groves (AUS)	Team BikeExchange–Jayco	+ 6"
4	Danny van Poppel (NED)	Bora–Hansgrohe	+ 10"
5	Rick Zabel (GER)	Israel–Premier Tech	+ 10"
6	Cees Bol (NED)	Team DSM	+ 10"
7	Mirco Maestri (ITA)	Eolo–Kometa	+ 10"
8	Miguel Ángel Fernández (ESP)	Global 6 Cycling	+ 10"
9	Filippo Tagliani (ITA)	Drone Hopper–Androni Giocattoli	+ 10"
10	Carlos Canal (ESP)	Euskaltel–Euskadi	+ 10"

=== Stage 2 ===
11 April 2022 — Selçuk to Alaçatı, 154.4 km (95.9 mi)

Stage 2 Result
Rank	Rider	Team	Time
1	Kaden Groves (AUS)	Team BikeExchange–Jayco	4h 02' 11"
2	Jasper Philipsen (BEL)	Alpecin–Fenix	+ 0"
3	Sam Bennett (IRL)	Bora–Hansgrohe	+ 0"
4	Cees Bol (NED)	Team DSM	+ 0"
5	Caleb Ewan (AUS)	Lotto–Soudal	+ 0"
6	Jasper De Buyst (BEL)	Lotto–Soudal	+ 0"
7	Danny van Poppel (NED)	Bora–Hansgrohe	+ 0"
8	Miguel Ángel Fernández (ESP)	Global 6 Cycling	+ 0"
9	Rick Zabel (GER)	Israel–Premier Tech	+ 0"
10	Giovanni Lonardi (ITA)	Eolo–Kometa	+ 0"

General classification after Stage 2
Rank	Rider	Team	Time
1	Kaden Groves (AUS)	Team BikeExchange–Jayco	8h 40' 12"
2	Jasper Philipsen (BEL)	Alpecin–Fenix	+ 2"
3	Caleb Ewan (AUS)	Lotto–Soudal	+ 4"
4	Cees Bol (NED)	Team DSM	+ 14"
5	Danny van Poppel (NED)	Bora–Hansgrohe	+ 14"
6	Rick Zabel (GER)	Israel–Premier Tech	+ 14"
7	Miguel Ángel Fernández (ESP)	Global 6 Cycling	+ 14"
8	Scott McGill (USA)	Wildlife Generation Pro Cycling	+ 14"
9	Filippo Tagliani (ITA)	Drone Hopper–Androni Giocattoli	+ 14"
10	Patrick Bevin (NZL)	Israel–Premier Tech	+ 14"

=== Stage 3 ===
12 April 2022 — Çeşme to İzmir, 121.8 km (75.7 mi)

Stage 3 Result
Rank	Rider	Team	Time
1	Jasper Philipsen (BEL)	Alpecin–Fenix	2h 35' 19"
2	Kaden Groves (AUS)	Team BikeExchange–Jayco	+ 0"
3	Miguel Ángel Fernández (ESP)	Global 6 Cycling	+ 0"
4	Daniel McLay (GBR)	Arkéa–Samsic	+ 0"
5	Alberto Dainese (ITA)	Team DSM	+ 0"
6	Mihkel Räim (EST)	Burgos BH	+ 0"
7	Iúri Leitão (POR)	Caja Rural–Seguros RGA	+ 0"
8	Sam Bennett (IRL)	Bora–Hansgrohe	+ 0"
9	Filippo Tagliani (ITA)	Drone Hopper–Androni Giocattoli	+ 0"
10	Gleb Brussenskiy (KAZ)	Astana Qazaqstan Team	+ 0"

General classification after Stage 3
Rank	Rider	Team	Time
1	Jasper Philipsen (BEL)	Alpecin–Fenix	11h 15' 23"
2	Kaden Groves (AUS)	Team BikeExchange–Jayco	+ 2"
3	Caleb Ewan (AUS)	Lotto–Soudal	+ 12"
4	Miguel Ángel Fernández (ESP)	Global 6 Cycling	+ 18"
5	Scott McGill (USA)	Wildlife Generation Pro Cycling	+ 19"
6	Léo Bouvier (FRA)	Bike Aid	+ 21"
7	Filippo Tagliani (ITA)	Drone Hopper–Androni Giocattoli	+ 22"
8	Rick Zabel (GER)	Israel–Premier Tech	+ 22"
9	Georgios Bouglas (GRE)	Spor Toto Cycling Team	+ 22"
10	Cees Bol (NED)	Team DSM	+ 22"

=== Stage 4 ===
13 April 2022 — İzmir to Mount Sipylus, 152.1 km (94.5 mi)

Stage 4 Result
Rank	Rider	Team	Time
1	Eduardo Sepúlveda (ARG)	Drone Hopper–Androni Giocattoli	3h 48' 38"
2	Patrick Bevin (NZL)	Israel–Premier Tech	+ 15"
3	Harm Vanhoucke (BEL)	Lotto–Soudal	+ 15"
4	Nairo Quintana (COL)	Arkéa–Samsic	+ 15"
5	Jay Vine (AUS)	Alpecin–Fenix	+ 15"
6	Dawit Yemane (ERI)	Bike Aid	+ 20"
7	Sean Bennett (USA)	China Glory Continental Cycling Team	+ 24"
8	Nicolas Edet (FRA)	Arkéa–Samsic	+ 38"
9	Adne van Engelen (NED)	Bike Aid	+ 38"
10	Anders Halland Johannessen (NOR)	Uno-X Pro Cycling Team	+ 41"

General classification after Stage 4
Rank	Rider	Team	Time
1	Eduardo Sepúlveda (ARG)	Drone Hopper–Androni Giocattoli	15h 04' 18"
2	Patrick Bevin (NZL)	Israel–Premier Tech	+ 14"
3	Jay Vine (AUS)	Alpecin–Fenix	+ 25"
4	Harm Vanhoucke (BEL)	Lotto–Soudal	+ 37"
5	Anders Halland Johannessen (NOR)	Uno-X Pro Cycling Team	+ 46"
6	Nicolas Edet (FRA)	Arkéa–Samsic	+ 53"
7	Dawit Yemane (ERI)	Bike Aid	+ 53"
8	Sean Bennett (USA)	China Glory Continental Cycling Team	+ 57"
9	Mustafa Sayar (TUR)	Sakarya BB Pro Team	+ 1' 10"
10	Henri Vandenabeele (BEL)	Team DSM	+ 1' 12"

=== Stage 5 ===
14 April 2022 — Manisa to Ayvalık, 191.7 km (119.1 mi)

Stage 5 Result
Rank	Rider	Team	Time
1	Sam Welsford (AUS)	Team DSM	4h 13' 49"
2	Jasper Philipsen (BEL)	Alpecin–Fenix	+ 0"
3	Arvid de Kleijn (NED)	Human Powered Health	+ 0"
4	Rick Zabel (GER)	Israel–Premier Tech	+ 0"
5	Itamar Einhorn (ISR)	Israel–Premier Tech	+ 0"
6	Daniel McLay (GBR)	Arkéa–Samsic	+ 0"
7	Caleb Ewan (AUS)	Lotto–Soudal	+ 0"
8	Cees Bol (NED)	Team DSM	+ 0"
9	Sacha Modolo (ITA)	Bardiani–CSF–Faizanè	+ 0"
10	Andrea Peron (ITA)	Team Novo Nordisk	+ 0"

General classification after Stage 5
Rank	Rider	Team	Time
1	Eduardo Sepúlveda (ARG)	Drone Hopper–Androni Giocattoli	19h 18' 07"
2	Patrick Bevin (NZL)	Israel–Premier Tech	+ 13"
3	Jay Vine (AUS)	Alpecin–Fenix	+ 25"
4	Harm Vanhoucke (BEL)	Lotto–Soudal	+ 37"
5	Anders Halland Johannessen (NOR)	Uno-X Pro Cycling Team	+ 46"
6	Nicolas Edet (FRA)	Arkéa–Samsic	+ 53"
7	Dawit Yemane (ERI)	Bike Aid	+ 53"
8	Sean Bennett (USA)	China Glory Continental Cycling Team	+ 57"
9	Mustafa Sayar (TUR)	Sakarya BB Pro Team	+ 1' 10"
10	Henri Vandenabeele (BEL)	Team DSM	+ 1' 12"

=== Stage 6 ===
15 April 2022 — Edremit, Balıkesir to Eceabat, 204.6 km (127.1 mi)

Stage 6 Result
Rank	Rider	Team	Time
1	Caleb Ewan (AUS)	Lotto–Soudal	4h 54' 00"
2	Jasper Philipsen (BEL)	Alpecin–Fenix	+ 0"
3	Danny van Poppel (NED)	Bora–Hansgrohe	+ 0"
4	Patrick Bevin (NZL)	Israel–Premier Tech	+ 0"
5	Campbell Stewart (NZL)	Team BikeExchange–Jayco	+ 0"
6	Jasper De Buyst (BEL)	Lotto–Soudal	+ 0"
7	Kaden Groves (AUS)	Team BikeExchange–Jayco	+ 0"
8	Eduard Prades (ESP)	Caja Rural–Seguros RGA	+ 0"
9	Antonio Angulo (ESP)	Euskaltel–Euskadi	+ 0"
10	Francesco Gavazzi (ITA)	Eolo–Kometa	+ 0"

General classification after Stage 6
Rank	Rider	Team	Time
1	Eduardo Sepúlveda (ARG)	Drone Hopper–Androni Giocattoli	24h 12' 07"
2	Patrick Bevin (NZL)	Israel–Premier Tech	+ 11"
3	Jay Vine (AUS)	Alpecin–Fenix	+ 25"
4	Harm Vanhoucke (BEL)	Lotto–Soudal	+ 37"
5	Anders Halland Johannessen (NOR)	Uno-X Pro Cycling Team	+ 46"
6	Nicolas Edet (FRA)	Arkéa–Samsic	+ 53"
7	Dawit Yemane (ERI)	Bike Aid	+ 53"
8	Sean Bennett (USA)	China Glory Continental Cycling Team	+ 57"
9	Mustafa Sayar (TUR)	Sakarya BB Pro Team	+ 1' 10"
10	Henri Vandenabeele (BEL)	Team DSM	+ 1' 12"

=== Stage 7 ===
16 April 2022 — Gelibolu to Tekirdağ, 135.3 km (84.1 mi)

Stage 7 Result
Rank	Rider	Team	Time
1	Patrick Bevin (NZL)	Israel–Premier Tech	3h 21' 02"
2	Jay Vine (AUS)	Alpecin–Fenix	+ 2"
3	Nicolas Edet (FRA)	Arkéa–Samsic	+ 4"
4	Jasper Philipsen (BEL)	Alpecin–Fenix	+ 41"
5	Jasper De Buyst (BEL)	Lotto–Soudal	+ 41"
6	Danny van Poppel (NED)	Bora–Hansgrohe	+ 41"
7	Francesco Gavazzi (ITA)	Eolo–Kometa	+ 41"
8	Dylan Sunderland (AUS)	Global 6 Cycling	+ 41"
9	Corbin Strong (NZL)	Israel–Premier Tech	+ 41"
10	Henri Vandenabeele (BEL)	Team DSM	+ 41"

General classification after Stage 7
Rank	Rider	Team	Time
1	Patrick Bevin (NZL)	Israel–Premier Tech	27h 33' 10"
2	Jay Vine (AUS)	Alpecin–Fenix	+ 20"
3	Eduardo Sepúlveda (ARG)	Drone Hopper–Androni Giocattoli	+ 40"
4	Nicolas Edet (FRA)	Arkéa–Samsic	+ 52"
5	Harm Vanhoucke (BEL)	Lotto–Soudal	+ 1' 17"
6	Anders Halland Johannessen (NOR)	Uno-X Pro Cycling Team	+ 1' 26"
7	Dawit Yemane (ERI)	Bike Aid	+ 1' 33"
8	Sean Bennett (USA)	China Glory Continental Cycling Team	+ 1' 37"
9	Mustafa Sayar (TUR)	Sakarya BB Pro Team	+ 1' 50"
10	Henri Vandenabeele (BEL)	Team DSM	+ 1' 52"

=== Stage 8 ===
17 April 2022 — Istanbul to Istanbul, 141.5 km (87.9 mi)

Cancelled after 25km

== Classification leadership table ==
Classification leadership by stage
Stage	Winner	General classification	Points classification	Mountains classification	Turkish Beauties Sprints classification	Team classification
1	Caleb Ewan	Caleb Ewan	Caleb Ewan	Nicolas Edet	Vitaliy Buts	Israel–Premier Tech
2	Kaden Groves	Kaden Groves	Kaden Groves	Noah Granigan	Noah Granigan	Israel–Premier Tech
3	Jasper Philipsen	Jasper Philipsen	Jasper Philipsen	Noah Granigan	Vitaliy Buts	Israel–Premier Tech
4	Eduardo Sepúlveda	Eduardo Sepúlveda	Jasper Philipsen	Eduardo Sepúlveda	Vitaliy Buts	Equipo Kern Pharma
5	Sam Welsford	Eduardo Sepúlveda	Jasper Philipsen	Eduardo Sepúlveda	Vitaliy Buts	Equipo Kern Pharma
6	Caleb Ewan	Eduardo Sepúlveda	Jasper Philipsen	Noah Granigan	Batuhan Özgür	Equipo Kern Pharma
7	Patrick Bevin	Patrick Bevin	Jasper Philipsen	Noah Granigan	Batuhan Özgür	Equipo Kern Pharma
8	No winner	Stage was cancelled due to bad weather				
Final		Patrick Bevin	Jasper Philipsen	Noah Granigan	Batuhan Özgür	Equipo Kern Pharma

=== Notes ===
- In Stage 2 Jasper Philipsen who was second in the points classification wore the green points jersey as first placed Caleb Ewan wore the Cyan Leaders jersey.
- In Stage 3 Jasper Philipsen who was second in the points classification wore the green points jersey as first placed Kaden Groves wore the Cyan Leaders jersey. Vitaliy Buts who was wore the Turkish beauties white jersey as first placed Noah Granigan wore the red mountain jersey.
- In Stage 4 Kaden Groves who was second in the points classification wore the green points jersey as first placed Jasper Philipsen wore the Cyan Leaders jersey.
- In Stage 5 Noah Granigan who was second in the mountain classification wore the red jersey as first placed Eduardo Sepúlveda wore the Cyan Leaders jersey.

== Final standings ==
Legend
General classification	Denotes the winner of the general classification	Mountain classification	Denotes the winner of the mountains classification
Points classification	Denotes the winner of the points classification	Turkish Beauties Sprints classification	Denotes the winner of the Turkish Beauties Sprints classification

=== General classification ===
Final General classification (1–10)
Rank	Rider	Team	Time
1	Patrick Bevin (NZL)	Israel–Premier Tech	27h 33' 10"
2	Jay Vine (AUS)	Alpecin–Fenix	+ 20"
3	Eduardo Sepúlveda (ARG)	Drone Hopper–Androni Giocattoli	+ 40"
4	Nicolas Edet (FRA)	Arkéa–Samsic	+ 52"
5	Harm Vanhoucke (BEL)	Lotto–Soudal	+ 1' 17"
6	Anders Halland Johannessen (NOR)	Uno-X Pro Cycling Team	+ 1' 26"
7	Dawit Yemane (ERI)	Bike Aid	+ 1' 33"
8	Sean Bennett (USA)	China Glory Continental Cycling Team	+ 1' 37"
9	Mustafa Sayar (TUR)	Sakarya BB Pro Team	+ 1' 50"
10	Henri Vandenabeele (BEL)	Team DSM	+ 1' 52"

=== Points classification ===
Final Points classification (1–10)
Rank	Rider	Team	Points
1	Jasper Philipsen (BEL)	Alpecin–Fenix	88
2	Kaden Groves (AUS)	Team BikeExchange–Jayco	56
3	Caleb Ewan (AUS)	Lotto–Soudal	50
4	Patrick Bevin (NZL)	Israel–Premier Tech	50
5	Danny van Poppel (NED)	Bora–Hansgrohe	44
6	Jasper De Buyst (BEL)	Lotto–Soudal	31
7	Cees Bol (NED)	Team DSM	30
8	Rick Zabel (GER)	Israel–Premier Tech	30
9	Jay Vine (AUS)	Alpecin–Fenix	29
10	Miguel Ángel Fernández (ESP)	Global 6 Cycling	29

=== Mountains classification ===
Final Mountains classification (1–10)
Rank	Rider	Team	Points
1	Noah Granigan (USA)	Wildlife Generation Pro Cycling	14
2	Eduardo Sepúlveda (ARG)	Drone Hopper–Androni Giocattoli	10
3	Nicolas Edet (FRA)	Arkéa–Samsic	10
4	Patrick Bevin (NZL)	Israel–Premier Tech	10
5	Harm Vanhoucke (BEL)	Lotto–Soudal	8
6	Jay Vine (AUS)	Alpecin–Fenix	6
7	Nickolas Zukowsky (CAN)	Human Powered Health	5
8	Feritcan Şamlı (TUR)	Spor Toto Cycling Team	5
9	Michiel Stockman (BEL)	Saris Rouvy Sauerland Team	3
10	Julen Irizar (ESP)	Euskaltel–Euskadi	3

=== Turkish Beauties Sprints classification ===
Final Turkish Beauties Sprints classification (1–10)
Rank	Rider	Team	Points
1	Batuhan Özgür (TUR)	Sakarya BB Pro Team	10
2	Feritcan Şamlı (TUR)	Spor Toto Cycling Team	6
3	Noah Granigan (USA)	Wildlife Generation Pro Cycling	6
4	Oğuzhan Tiryaki (TUR)	Spor Toto Cycling Team	5
5	Scott McGill (USA)	Wildlife Generation Pro Cycling	5
6	Abraham Stockman (BEL)	Saris Rouvy Sauerland Team	5
7	Elchin Asadov (AZE)	Sakarya BB Pro Team	3
8	Jon Knolle (GER)	Saris Rouvy Sauerland Team	3
9	Peio Goikoetxea (ESP)	Euskaltel–Euskadi	3
10	Julen Irizar (ESP)	Euskaltel–Euskadi	3

=== Team classification ===
Final team classification (1–10)
Rank	Team	Time
1	(Spain) Equipo Kern Pharma	82h 52' 44"
2	(Germany) Bike Aid	+ 21"
3	(Italy) Eolo–Kometa	+ 1' 08"
4	(Spain) Euskaltel–Euskadi	+ 2' 05"
5	(France) Arkéa–Samsic	+ 2' 41"
6	(Spain) Caja Rural–Seguros RGA	+ 3' 53"
7	China Glory Continental Cycling Team	+ 8' 01"
8	(Australia) Team BikeExchange–Jayco	+ 10' 03"
9	(Italy) Drone Hopper–Androni Giocattoli	+ 11' 22"
10	(New Zealand) Global 6 Cycling	+ 11' 24"
