= Burak Abay =

Turkish cyclist (born 1996)

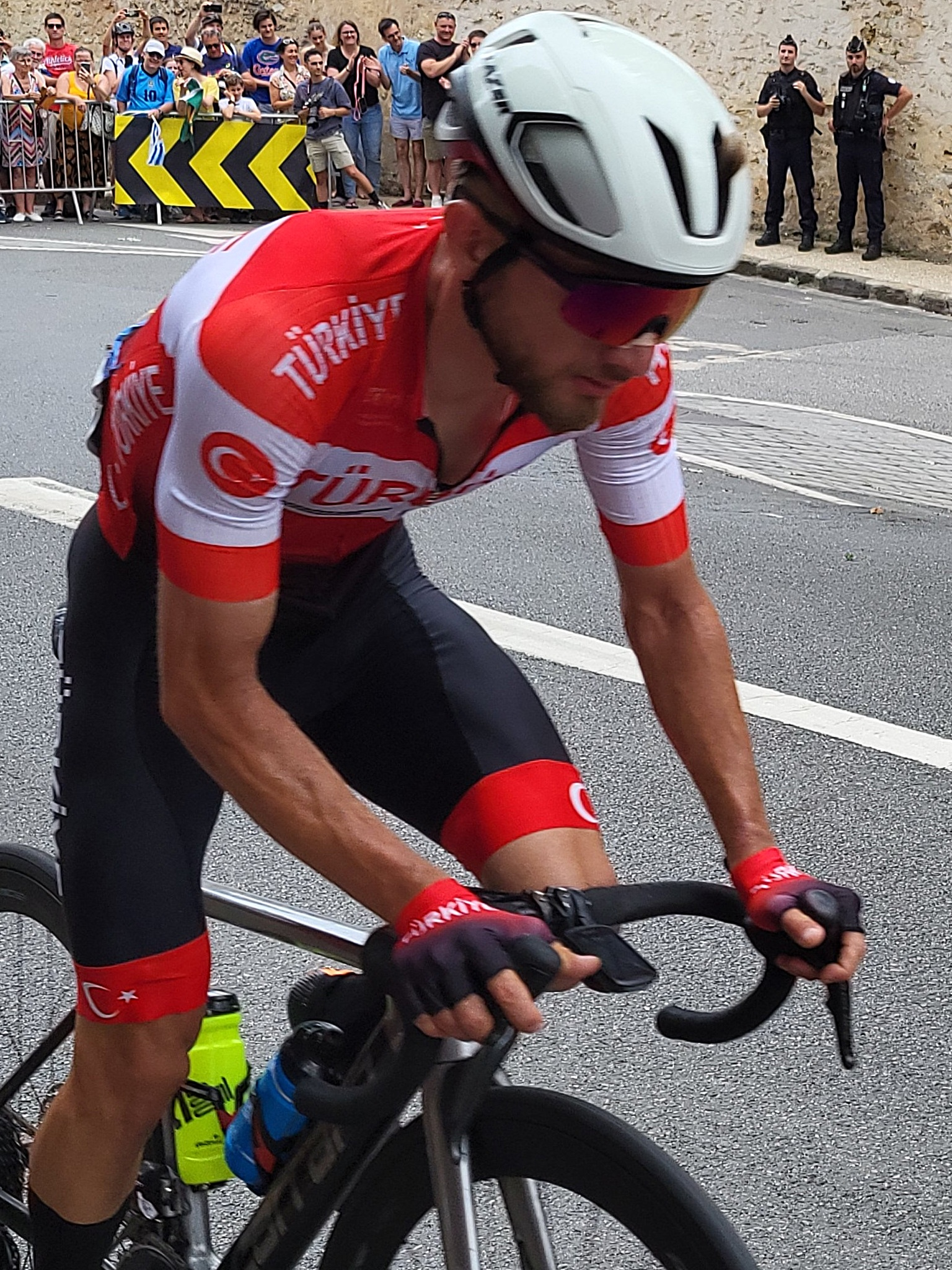
- Abay at the 2024 Summer Olympics

Personal information
- Born: 1 January 1996 (age 30)

Cycling career
- Sport: Cycling
- Current team: Sakarya BB Pro Team
- Discipline: Road
- Role: Rider

Amateur teams
- 2015: Brisaspor
- 2016–2017: Salcano Kapadokya BSK

Professional teams
- 2019: Brunei Continental Cycling Team
- 2021: Salcano–Sakarya BB Team
- 2022: Spor Toto Cycling Team
- 2023: Konya Büyükşehir Belediyespor
- 2024–: Sakarya BB Pro Team

Major wins
- One-day races and Classics National Road Race Championships (2023)

Burak Abay (born 1 January 1996) is a Turkish cyclist, who currently rides for UCI Continental team Sakarya BB Pro Team.

== Career ==
He won the Turkish National Road Race Championships in 2023. In September of that year, he suffered a heavy fall in the second stage of the Tour of Van. The following season, he was selected to compete in the road race at the 2024 Summer Olympics.

== Major results ==
2016
5th Overall Tour of Ankara
2018
5th Time trial, National Road Championships
2019
5th Overall Tour of Mesopotamia
8th Overall Tour of Mersin
8th Overall Tour of Central Anatolia
10th Grand Prix Velo Erciyes
10th Grand Prix Erciyes
2022
National Road Championships

2nd Time trial
4th Road race

4th Overall Tour of Sakarya
6th Time trial, Islamic Solidarity Games
6th Grand Prix Cappadocia
8th Grand Prix Tomarza
8th Grand Prix Develi
9th Grand Prix Kayseri
2023 (1 pro win)
National Road Championships

1st Road race
2nd Time trial

2nd Grand Prix Erciyes
2nd Grand Prix Aspendos
2nd Alanya Cup
3rd Overall Kırıkkale Road Race
6th Overall 100th Anniversary Tour of The Republic
6th Overall Tour of Yiğido
6th Grand Prix Kaisareia
10th Overall Tour of Albania
2024
2nd Grand Prix Kaisareia
National Road Championships

3rd Road race
4th Time trial

5th Grand Prix Altınkale
6th Tour of Alanya
6th GP Yıldızdağı
7th Grand Prix Syedra Ancient City
9th Overall Tour of Sakarya
10th Grand Prix Apollon Temple
10th Grand Prix Antalya Airport City
