= Giorgi Nadiradze =

Giorgi Nadiradze may refer to:

- Giorgi Nadiradze (footballer) (born 1968), Georgian international footballer
- Giorgi Nadiradze (cyclist) (born 1987), Georgian road bicycle racer
- Giorgi Nadiradze (Photographer) (born 1993), Georgian Photographer

== See also ==
- Nadiradze
