= Halil İbrahim Doğan =

Turkish cyclist

Personal information
- Full name: Halil İbrahim Doğan
- Born: 6 October 2000 (age 26) Kütahya, Turkey

Cycling career
- Sport: Cycling
- Current team: Istanbul Büyükșehir Belediye Spor Türkiye
- Discipline: Road
- Role: Rider

Professional teams
- 2019–2020: Salcano–Sakarya BB Team
- 2021: Spor Toto Cycling Team
- 2022: Bike Aid
- 2022: Sakarya BB Pro Team
- 2023–: Beykoz Belediyesi Spor Kulübü

Halil İbrahim Doğan (born 6 October 2000) is a Turkish cyclist, who currently rides for UCI Continental team Istanbul Büyükșehir Belediye Spor Türkiye.

== Major results ==
2017
2nd Overall Memorial Dimitar Yankov Sunny Beach
2018
1st Road race, National Junior Road Championships
2nd Overall Belgrade Trophy Milan Panić
2019
1st Road race, National Under-23 Road Championships
3rd Overall Tour of Mersin
7th Bursa Orhangazi Race
2020
2nd Road race, National Road Championships
2nd Time trial, National Under-23 Road Championships
9th Grand Prix Alanya
10th Grand Prix World's Best High Altitude
2021
1st Time trial, National Under-23 Road Championships
9th Grand Prix Develi
2022
2nd Road race, National Road Championships
3rd Time trial, National Under-23 Road Championships
9th Grand Prix Gündoğmuş
2023
4th Courts Mammouth Classique de l'île Maurice
7th Syedra Ancient City
10th Grand Prix de la Ville d'Alger
