= Nazim Bakırcı =

Turkish cyclist (born 1986)

Personal information
- Born: 29 May 1986 (age 40) Konya, Turkey

Cycling career
- Sport: Cycling
- Discipline: Road
- Role: Rider

Amateur teams
- 2000–2004: MEDAŞ Tek Meramspor
- 2007–2008: Konya Şekerspor

Professional teams
- 2008–2011: Brisaspor
- 2012–2018: Konya–Torku Şekerspor

Nazim Bakırcı (born 29 May 1986 in Konya) is a Turkish cyclist, who last rode for Torku Şekerspor.

== Major results ==
2008
2nd Road race, National Road Championships
2009
2nd Road race, National Road Championships
2010
7th Overall Tour of Victory
2011
1st Overall Tour of Victory

1st Stage 3

National Road Championships

2nd Road race
7th Time trial

2nd Overall Tour of Isparta

1st Stage 3

2nd Overall Tour of Alanya
3rd Overall Tour of Marmara
4th Overall Tour of Gallipoli
6th Overall Tour of Trakya
2013
1st Road race, National Road Championships
2014
5th Road race, National Road Championships
2015
1st Overall Tour of Ankara

1st Stage 1

5th Road race, National Road Championships
10th Overall Tour of Aegean
2016
1st Overall Tour of Mersin

1st Mountains classification

1st Points classification Tour of Ankara
10th Balkan Elite Road Classics
2017
9th Overall Tour de Serbie
9th Overall Tour of Mersin

1st Mountains classification

10th Overall Tour d'Azerbaïdjan
2018
1st Overall Tour of Mesopotamia

1st Stage 1

8th Overall Tour of Cappadocia
