= Mustafa Sayar =

Turkish cyclist (born 1989)

Personal information
- Full name: Mustafa Sayar
- Born: 22 April 1989 (age 37)

Cycling career
- Sport: Cycling
- Current team: Sakarya BB Pro Team
- Discipline: Road
- Role: Rider
- Rider type: Climber

Professional teams
- 2011–2013: Konya–Şekerspor–Torku–Vivelo
- 2015: China Jilun Cycling Team
- 2016–2017: Torku Şekerspor
- 2019–: Salcano–Sakarya BB Team

Mustafa Sayar (born 22 April 1989) is a Turkish professional cyclist who rides for UCI Continental team Sakarya BB Pro Team. In 2013, he was suspended following his testing positive for erythropoietin.

== Career ==
In 2013, Sayar won the sixth stage of the Tour of Turkey by powering away on the climb to Selçuk in an improbably large gear, leading to disbelief and insinuations from the live TV commentary team and other riders in the race, including Marcel Kittel, who tweeted that he was "not often in my life so angry about a result of someone else". Sayar was the first Turkish rider to provisionally win a stage in the Tour since 2008. With that result, he took the lead in the overall classification. He successfully defended the leader's jersey over the next two stages and won the race.

=== Doping suspension ===
On 15 July 2013, Sayar was suspended, following his testing positive for erythropoietin during the Tour d'Algérie in March. As a result, he lost his overall victory in the Tour of Turkey, which went to Natnael Berhane. Sayar retired from the sport in November 2013, but returned to competition after completion of the ban.

== Major results ==
2009
1st Road race, National Under-23 Road Championships
2nd Time trial, National Road Championships
2010
2nd Overall Tour of Victory
6th Overall Tour of Trakya
2011
1st Overall Tour of Isparta

1st Prologue

4th Time trial, National Road Championships
4th Overall Tour of Alanya
4th Overall Tour of Trakya
5th Overall Tour of Cappadocia
5th Overall Tour of Marmara
2012
2nd Road race, National Road Championships
2013
~~1st Overall Tour of Turkey~~

~~1st Stage 6~~

~~2nd Time trial, National Road Championships~~
~~2nd Overall Tour de Blida~~

~~1st Mountains classification~~
~~1st Points classification~~
~~1st Stage 1~~

~~2nd Overall Tour d'Algérie~~

~~1st Mountains classification~~

~~5th Circuit d'Alger~~
~~9th Grand Prix of Donetsk~~
2016
3rd Time trial, National Road Championships
3rd Overall Tour of Ankara

1st Stage 3

4th Overall Tour of Mersin
2018
2nd Overall Tour of Cappadocia

1st Stage 2

3rd Overall Tour of Black Sea
3rd Road race, National Road Championships
7th Overall Tour of Mesopotamia
2019
1st Bursa Yıldırım Bayezıt Race
1st Mountains classification Tour of Mersin
National Road Championships

3rd Time trial
5th Road race

3rd Bursa Orhangazi Race
4th Overall Tour of Mesopotamia
2020
National Road Championships

1st Time trial
7th Road race

2021
3rd Time trial, National Road Championships
10th Grand Prix Kayseri
2022
1st Road race, National Road Championships
3rd Grand Prix Mediterranean
4th Grand Prix Gündoğmuş
9th Overall Tour of Turkey
