= Serkan Balkan =

Turkish cyclist (born 1994)

Personal information
- Full name: Serkan Balkan
- Born: 28 March 1994 (age 32) Trabzon, Turkey

Cycling career
- Sport: Cycling
- Discipline: Road
- Role: Rider

Amateur team
- 2021: Trek Trakya

Professional teams
- 2017–2018: Torku Şekerspor
- 2019–2020: Salcano–Sakarya BB Team

Serkan Balkan (born 28 March 1994 in Trabzon) is a Turkish cyclist who most recently rode for the Turkish amateur team Trek Trakya.

== Major results ==
2012
2nd Road race, National Junior Road Championships
2014
4th Road race, National Road Championships
2015
5th Overall Tour of Black Sea
2016
1st Overall Tour of Ankara

1st Stage 2

National Road Championships

2nd Under-23 road race
3rd Under-23 time trial
4th Road race

6th Overall Tour de Serbie

1st Young rider classification

7th Balkan Elite Road Classics
2018
8th Overall Tour of Black Sea
2019
9th Fatih Sultan Mehmet Edirne Race
2020
4th Road race, National Road Championships
