= Georgian National Road Championships =

National road cycling championships in Georgia

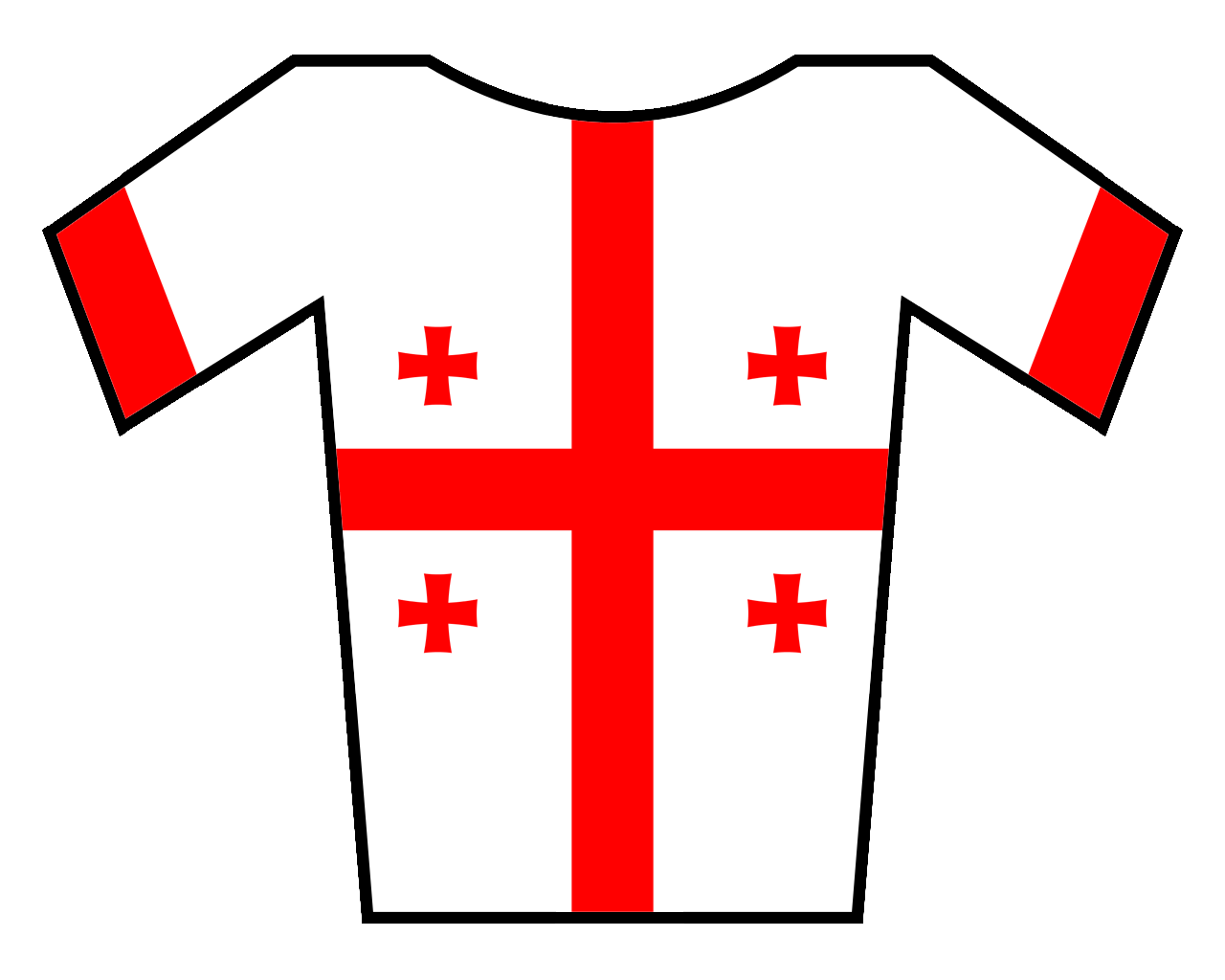

Race details
- Date: June
- Discipline: Road
- Type: One-day race

The Georgian National Road Championships are held annually to decide the cycling champions in both the road race and time trial discipline, across various categories.

== Men ==
=== Road race ===
Year	Winner	Second	Third
2010	Giorgi Nadiradze	Nodar Katsadze	Nodar Kvavadze
2011	Giorgi Nadiradze	Besik Gavasheli	Giorgi Sidiani
2012	Giorgi Nadiradze	Irakli Bablidze	Giorgi Nareklishvili
2013	Giorgi Nareklishvili	Giorgi Nadiradze	Viktor Erokhin
2014	Giorgi Nareklishvili	Dimitri Khosiauri	Giorgi Suvadzoglu
2015	Giorgi Nareklishvili	Giorgi Suvadzoglu	Besik Gavasheli
2016	Giorgi Nareklishvili	Beka Nareklishvili	Giorgi Suvadzoglu
2017	Giorgi Nareklishvili	Sulkhan Akhmaevi	Giorgi Suvadzoglu
2018	Tamaz Tsereteli	Sulkhan Akhmaevi	Giorgi Suvadzoglu
2019	Tornike Khabazi	Giorgi Suvadzoglu	Sulkhan Akhmaevi
2020	Not held due to the COVID-19 pandemic in Georgia
2021	Nika Sitchinava	Giorgi Suvadzoglu	Giorgi Kochakidze
2022	Giorgi Khorguani	Nika Sitchinava	Valeri Mamulashvili

=== Time trial ===
Year	Winner	Second	Third
2011	Giorgi Nadiradze	Besik Gavasheli	Archil Makharashvili
2012	Giorgi Nadiradze	Irakli Bablidze	Giorgi Nareklishvili
2013	Besik Gavasheli	Giorgi Nareklishvili	Giorgi Nadiradze
2014	Besik Gavasheli	Giorgi Nareklishvili	Viktor Erokhin
2015	Giorgi Nareklishvili	Besik Gavasheli	Beka Nareklishvili
2016	Beka Nareklishvili	Giorgi Nareklishvili	Luka Vekua
2017	Beka Nareklishvili	Giorgi Nareklishvili	Sulkhan Akhmaevi
2018	Tamaz Tsereteli	Sulkhan Akhmaevi	Giorgi Suvadzoglu
2019	Tornike Khabazi	Tengiz Barbakadze	Sulkhan Akhmaevi
2020	Not held due to the COVID-19 pandemic in Georgia
2021	Nika Sitchinava	Valeri Mamulashvili	Giorgi Suvadzoglu
2022	Giorgi Khorguani	Nika Sitchinava	Valeri Mamulashvili
