= İsmail Akşoy =

Turkish cyclist (born 1989)

Personal information
- Full name: İsmail Akşoy
- Born: 10 August 1989 (age 37) Antalya, Turkey
- Height: 1.78 m (5 ft 10 in)
- Weight: 75 kg (165 lb)

Cycling career
- Sport: Cycling
- Current team: Retired
- Discipline: Road
- Role: Rider
- Rider type: Sprinter

Amateur teams
- 2001–2008: Antalya Gençlik ve Spor Kulübü
- 2009–2014: Brisaspor

Professional team
- 2015–2016: Torku Şekerspor

İsmail Akşoy (born 10 August 1989 in Antalya) is a Turkish former professional cyclist.

== Major results ==
2009
3rd Road race, National Under-23 Road Championships
2011
1st Stage 6 Tour du Maroc
1st Stage 4 Tour of Gallipoli
1st Stage 1 (ITT) Tour of Alanya
2015
1st Stage 3 Tour of Iran (Azerbaijan)
1st Stage 3 Tour of Çanakkale
8th GP Al Massira, Les Challenges de la Marche Verte
