= Torku Şekerspor =

Cycling team

Team information
- UCI code: TRK
- Registered: Konya, Central Anatolia, Turkey
- Founded: 2005
- Disbanded: 2018
- Discipline: Road
- Status: UCI Continental
- Bicycles: Salcano

Key personnel
- Team manager: Branko Filip

Team name history
- 2005 2006–2007 2008–2009 2010 2011–2012 2012–2014 2014–2018: Hemus 1896 Aurora 2000 Berchi; Hemus 1896–Berneschi; Hemus 1896; Hemus 1896–Vivelo; Torquay Sheker Konya Vivelo; Konya–Torku Şekerspor; Torku Şekerspor

Torku Şekerspor (UCI team code: TRK) was a Turkish professional cycling team, based in Konya, Central Anatolia.They folded after the 2018 season. The team was sponsored by the local sugar and chocolate industries. It is part of the Konya Anadolu Selçukspor organisation, a Turkish TFF Second League football team.

In 2011, the team became Turkey's first ever professional bicycle racing team. It has UCI Continental team status.

Team member Miraç Kal qualified for participation in the road race event at the 2012 Summer Olympics.

Team member Ahmet Örken qualified for participation in the time trial event at the 2016 Summer Olympics.

== Doping ==
In April 2012 Ivailo Gabrovski tested positive for Erythropoietin (EPO) on Stage 3 of the 2012 Tour of Turkey, winning the stage and the overall title. Gabrovski was banned for two years and had his victory stripped. In May 2012 Volodymyr Bileka tested positive for Norpseudoephedrine on Stage 1 of the 2012 Tour of Trakya receiving a four-year suspension for his second doping offence.

In March 2013, Mustafa Sayar tested positive for EPO after Stage 1 of the 2013 Tour d'Algérie.

== Final roster ==
Rider	Date of birth
Fethi Acar (TUR)	January 1, 1996 (age 30)
Ahmet Akdilek (TUR)	March 10, 1988 (age 38)
Muhammet Atalay (TUR)	May 15, 1989 (age 37)
Nazim Bakırcı (TUR)	May 29, 1986 (age 40)
Onur Balkan (TUR)	March 10, 1996 (age 30)
Serkan Balkan (TUR)	March 28, 1994 (age 32)

Rider	Date of birth
Ivan Balykin (RUS)	November 26, 1990 (age 35)
Halil İbrahim Dilek (TUR)	October 12, 1998 (age 27)
Ahmet Orencik (TUR)	April 10, 1996 (age 30)
Batuhan Özgür (TUR)	February 1, 1998 (age 28)
Cristian Raileanu (MDA)	January 24, 1993 (age 33)
Ferit Şamlı (TUR)	January 29, 1994 (age 32)

== Major wins ==
2010
Overall, Romania Tour of Szeklerland, Evgeniy Gerganov
Stage 7 Tour of Bulgaria, Evgeniy Gerganov
Overall The Paths of King Nikola, Vladimir Koev

Stage 1, Vladimir Koev

2011
Stage 5 Tour du Maroc, Eyüp Karagöbek
Stage 4 Tour of Trakya, Muhammet Atalay
Overall Tour of Isparta, Mustafa Sayar

Stage 1, Mustafa Sayar
Stage 3, Danail Petrov

Stage 5 Tour of Romania, Vladimir Koev
Stage 3 Tour of Cappadocia, Miraç Kal
Overall Sibiu Cycling Tour, Vladimir Koev

Stage 3, Vladimir Koev

Stage 4 Tour of Marmara, Eyüp Karagöbek
Stage 4 Tour of Alanya, Hüseyin Özcan

2012
Stage 4 Azerbaijan Tour, Yuriy Metlushenko
Overall Tour of Trakya, Yuriy Metlushenko

Stages 1, 2 & 4, Yuriy Metlushenko

Stage 3 Baltic Chain Tour, Yuriy Metlushenko
Stage 4 Tour of Taihu Lake, Yuriy Metlushenko

2013
Stage 2 Tour d'Algérie, Sergiy Grechyn
Stage 1 Tour de Blida, Mustafa Sayar
Stage 6 Tour du Maroc, Ahmet Örken
Overall Tour d'Azerbaïdjan, Sergiy Grechyn

Stage 2, Sergiy Grechyn

Stages 4 & 6 Tour de Serbie, Ahmet Örken
Stage 2 Tour of Qinghai Lake, David de la Fuente
Overall Tour of Taihu Lake, Yuriy Metlushenko

Stages 1, 2, 3, 4 & 9, Yuriy Metlushenko

2014
Stage 9 Tour of Qinghai Lake, Ahmet Örken

2015
Overall Tour of Çanakkale, Ahmet Akdilek

Prologue, Ahmet Akdilek
Stage 3, İsmail Akşoy

Overall Tour du Maroc, Tomasz Marczyński

Stages 1, 4 & 7, Tomasz Marczyński
Stage 2, Ahmet Örken

Overall Tour of Black Sea, Tomasz Marczyński

Stage 1, Tomasz Marczyński
Stage 3, Ahmet Örken

Stage 3 Tour of Iran, İsmail Akşoy
Overall Tour of Ankara, Nazim Bakırcı

Stage 1, Nazim Bakırcı
Stage 4, Feritcan Şamlı

Overall International Tour of Torku Mevlana, Ahmet Örken

Prologue, Stages 2 & 3, Ahmet Örken

Overall Tour of Aegean, Ahmet Örken

Prologue & Stage 1, Ahmet Örken
Stage 3, Rasim Reis

2016
Overall Tour of Mersin, Nazim Bakırcı
Stage 1 Tour of Ankara, Feritcan Şamlı
Stage 2 Tour of Ankara, Mustafa Sayar
Stage 3 Tour of Ankara, Fatih Keleş

2017
Les Challenges de la Marche Verte GP Oued Eddahab, Ivan Balykin
Les Challenges de la Marche Verte GP Al Massira, Ahmet Örken
Stage 2 Tour of Ankara, Ivan Balykin
Stage 2b (ITT) Tour of Bihor, Ivan Balykin
Stage 2 Tour de Serbie, Luca Chirico
Stage 3 Tour de Serbie, Ahmet Örken
Stages 4 & 10 Tour of Qinghai Lake, Ahmet Örken

2018
Overall Tour of Mediterrennean, Onur Balkan

Stages 2 & 3, Onur Balkan

Overall Tour of Cartier, Cristian Raileanu

Stage 2, Cristian Raileanu

Stage 2 Tour of Fatih Sultan Mehmet, Batuhan Ozgur
Overall Tour of Mesopotamia, Nazim Bakırcı

Stage 1, Ivan Balykin
Stage 2, Nazim Bakırcı
Stage 4, Onur Balkan

Overall Tour of Mevlana, Ivan Balykin

Stage 2, Ivan Balykin

Stage 9 Tour of Qinghai Lake, Onur Balkan
Stage 3 Tour of Cappadocia, Onur Balkan
Stage 5 Tour of Romania, Onur Balkan
Stage 3 Tour of Black Sea, Batuhan Ozgur

== National champions ==
2009
Turkey Road Race, Miraç Kal

2011
Bulgaria Road Race, Danail Petrov

2012
Turkey Road Race, Miraç Kal
Turkey Under-23 Time Trial, Feritcan Şamlı

2013
Turkey Road Race, Nazim Bakırcı
Turkey Time Trial, Bekir Baki Akırşan
Kazakhstan Time Trial, Andrey Mizurov

2014
Turkey Road Race, Feritcan Şamlı
Turkey Time Trial, Ahmet Örken
Turkey Under-23 Time Trial, Alihan Demirbağ

2015
Turkey Road Race, Ahmet Akdilek
Turkey Time Trial, Ahmet Örken
Poland Road Race, Tomasz Marczyński
Turkey Under-23 Road Race, Batuhan Özgür
Turkey Under-23 Time Trial, Halil İbrahim Dilek

2016
Turkey Time Trial, Ahmet Örken

2018
Turkey Road Race, Onur Balkan
