= Ahmet Örken =

Turkish cyclist (born 1993)

Personal information
- Full name: Ahmet Örken
- Born: 12 March 1993 (age 33) Çumra, Konya Province, Turkey
- Height: 177 cm (5 ft 10 in)
- Weight: 77 kg (170 lb)

Cycling career
- Sport: Cycling
- Current team: Spor Toto Cycling Team
- Discipline: Road
- Role: Rider

Amateur team
- 2018: Salcano Sakarya Büyükşehir

Professional teams
- 2012–2017: Konya–Torku Şekerspor
- 2019: Salcano–Sakarya BB Team
- 2020–2021: Team Sapura Cycling
- 2022: Wildlife Generation Pro Cycling
- 2023–: Spor Toto Cycling Team

Major wins
- One-day races and Classics National Road Race Championships (2019) National Time Trial Championships (2014–2019, 2021–2022)

Ahmet Örken (born 12 March 1993) is a Turkish professional cyclist, who currently rides for UCI Continental team Spor Toto Cycling Team.

== Early life ==
Born in Çumra Konya Province as the second child of a family of Tatar descent (a Turkic ethnic subgroup). Örken began with cycling sport at the age of fourteen in 2007 at Çumra, Konya Province, where he moved from his village with his mother to enable his older brother's education there. The next year, he entered the cycling team at Çatalhöyük Çumra Municipality Sports Club with the help of his brother.

== Career ==
He became the first ever European cycling champion from Turkey with his win at the 2011 European Track Championships in the junior omnium held in Portugal.

In 2013, Ahmet Örken won the sixth stage of the Tour du Maroc, between Meknes and Khenifra, despite injuries he suffered during a fall in a mass crash after 20 kilometres (12 miles). He finished third in stage eight, between Beni Mellal and Marrakesh. Örken won the fourth (Kladovo to Požarevac) and sixth (Sremska Mitrovica to Belgrade) stages of the Tour de Serbie in 2013.

Örken had signed to join ProContinental team Israel Cycling Academy from 2018, but at a time of heightened tensions in the Middle East, he pulled out of the agreement after he and his family were put under pressure.

== Major results ==
2009
Balkan Novice Road Championships

1st Road race
1st Time trial

National Novice Road Championships

1st Road race
1st Time trial

2010
National Junior Road Championships

1st Road race
1st Time trial

1st Prix des Vins Valloton Juniors
2011
1st Omnium, UEC European Junior Track Championships
2013
Tour de Serbie

1st Stages 4 & 6

1st Stage 6 Tour du Maroc
6th Tour of Nanjing
2014
1st Time trial, National Road Championships
1st Stage 9 Tour of Qinghai Lake
9th Overall Tour of Taihu Lake
2015
1st Time trial, National Road Championships
1st Overall International Tour of Torku Mevlana

1st Sprints classification
1st Prologue, Stages 2 & 3

1st Overall Tour of Aegean

1st Prologue & Stage 1

1st Stage 2 Tour du Maroc
1st Stage 3 Tour of Black Sea
3rd Overall Tour of Ankara

1st Mountains classification

7th Overall Tour of Taihu Lake
2016
National Road Championships

1st Time trial
2nd Road race

34th Summer Olympic time trial
2017
National Road Championships

1st Time trial
3rd Road race

1st Overall North-Cyprus Presidential Cycling Tour

1st Stages 1, 3 & 4

Les Challenges de la Marche Verte

1st GP Al Massira
3rd GP Oued Eddahab
5th GP Sakia El Hamra

Tour of Qinghai Lake

1st Points classification
1st Stages 4 & 10

1st Stage 3 Tour de Serbie
2nd International Rhodes Grand Prix
Challenge du Prince

4th Trophée de l'Anniversaire
4th Trophée de la Maison Royale

2018
1st Time trial, National Road Championships
Tour of Mevlana

1st Prologue & Stage 4

4th Overall Tour of Fatih Sultan Mehmet
5th Time trial, Mediterranean Games
7th Grand Prix Minsk
9th Overall Tour of Cappadocia

1st Mountains classification
1st Stage 1

9th Grand Prix Alanya
2019
National Road Championships

1st Road race
1st Time trial

Tour of Mesopotamia

1st Points classification
1st Stage 4

2nd Overall Tour of Mevlana

1st Stage 3

5th Overall Tour of Black Sea
5th Grand Prix Alanya
1st Grand Prix Velo Erciyes

1st Stage 2

8th Grand Prix Gazipaşa
8th Minsk Cup
2020
3rd Time trial, National Road Championships
7th Overall Tour of Mevlana
2021
National Road Championships

1st Time trial
3rd Road race

2022
1st Time trial, National Road Championships
5th Time trial, Islamic Solidarity Games
8th Time trial, Mediterranean Games
2023
National Road Championships

1st Time trial
2nd Road race

1st Expo Kriteryum
2nd Overall Kırıkkale Road Race

1st Stage 2

3rd Grand Prix Aspendos
4th Overall Tour of Yiğido
4th Grand Prix Kaisareia
8th Syedra Ancient City
9th Overall 100th Anniversary Tour of The Republic

1st Stage 1

2024
National Road Championships

1st Time trial
4th Road race

1st Stage 7 Tour of Qinghai Lake
