= Nadiradze =

Nadiradze (Georgian: ნადირაძე) is a Georgian surname. Notable people with the surname include:

- Alexander Nadiradze (1914–1987), Soviet inventor, designer and engineer
- Giorgi Nadiradze (footballer) (born 1968), Georgian international footballer
- Giorgi Nadiradze (cyclist) (born 1987), Georgian road bicycle racer
- Kolau Nadiradze (1895–1990), Georgian poet
- Marina Nadiradze (born 1978), Georgian pianist
