= Giorgi Nareklishvili =

Georgian cyclist

Personal information
- Born: 6 March 1993 (age 33)

Cycling career
- Sport: Cycling
- Disciplines: Road; Track
- Role: Rider

Amateur team
- 2016: Lokomotiv

Giorgi Nareklishvili (born 6 March 1993) is a Georgian former cyclist. He has been the national road race champion of Georgia five times and time trial champion once.

== Major results ==
2012
National Road Championships

2nd Time trial
3rd Road race

2013
National Road Championships

1st Road race
2nd Time trial

2014
National Road Championships

1st Road race
2nd Time trial

National Track Championships

1st Individual pursuit
1st Kilo

2015
National Road Championships

1st Road race
1st Under-23 road race
1st Time trial
1st Under-23 time trial

2016
National Road Championships

1st Road race
2nd Time trial

8th Overall Tour of Ankara
2017
National Road Championships

1st Road race
2nd Time trial
