= Miraç Kal =

Turkish cyclist (born 1987)

Personal information
- Born: 8 July 1987 (age 39) Konya, Turkey
- Height: 1.77 m (5 ft 10 in)
- Weight: 70 kg (150 lb)

Cycling career
- Sport: Cycling
- Current team: Retired
- Disciplines: Road; Track
- Role: Rider

Amateur team
- 2015–2016: Salcano Cappadocia

Professional team
- 2011–2015: Konya–Şekerspor–Torku–Vivelo

Miraç Kal (born 8 July 1987 in Konya, Turkey) is a Turkish former road and track cyclist. Kal is 1.77 m (5 ft 10 in) tall and weighs 70 kg (150 lb).

Kal won the road race at the 2012 Turkish Cycling Championship held in Nevşehir. He qualified for participation in the men's road race and men's road time trial at the 2012 Summer Olympics.

== Major results ==
2005
1st Points race, Athens Open Junior Balkan Track Championships
2009
National Road Championships

1st Road race
3rd Time trial

7th Road race, Mediterranean Games
10th Overall Tour d'Egypte

1st Stage 2

2010
1st Stage 3 Tour of Trakya
1st Stage 5 Tour of Victory
2011
1st Stage 3 Tour of Cappadocia
Challenge des phosphates

5th Challenge Ben Guerir
7th Challenge Youssoufia

2012
1st Road race, National Road Championships
1st Points classification Tour of Greece
2013
1st Mountains classification Tour de Serbie
3rd Road race, National Road Championships
4th Road race, Mediterranean Games
2014
3rd Time trial, National Road Championships
2015
2nd Overall Tour of Çanakkale

1st Mountains classification
