= Grand Prix Justiniano Hotels (men's race) =

Cycling race

Race details
- Date: March
- Discipline: Road
- Competition: UCI Europe Tour
- Type: One-day race

History
- First edition: 2019
- Editions: 2 (as of 2022)
- First winner: Onur Balkan (TUR)
- Most wins: No repeat winners
- Most recent: Yauheni Karaliok (BLR)

The Grand Prix Justiniano Hotels is a cycling race held in Turkey. It is part of UCI Europe Tour in category 1.2.

== Winners ==
Year	Country	Rider	Team
2019	Turkey	Onur Balkan	Salcano–Sakarya BB Team
2022	Belarus	Yauheni Karaliok	Minsk Cycling Club
