= Kemal Küçükbay =

Turkish cyclist

Personal information
- Born: 23 August 1982 (age 44) Sivas, Turkey
- Height: 1.74 m (5 ft 9 in)
- Weight: 69 kg (152 lb)

Cycling career
- Sport: Cycling
- Discipline: Road
- Role: Rider

Amateur teams
- 2010–2018: Kocaeli–Brisaspor
- 2019: Konya Bisiklet SK

Kemal Küçükbay (born 23 August 1982 in Sivas, Turkey) is a Turkish former road cyclist. He participated in the men's road race at the 2012 Summer Olympics.

== Major results ==
2005
1st Road race, National Road Championships
7th Overall Kerman Tour
9th Overall Presidential Cycling Tour of Turkey
2006
1st Stage 10 Tour du Cameroun
6th Overall Presidential Cycling Tour of Turkey
2007
10th Overall Kerman Tour
2008
National Road Championships

1st Time trial
3rd Road race

8th Overall Tour d'Egypte
8th Overall Tour of Szeklerland
2009
2nd Road race, Balkan Road Championships
4th Overall Tour du Maroc
2010
1st Time trial, National Road Championships
1st Overall Tour of Marmara

1st Stage 1

1st Stage 2 Tour of Trakya
2nd Overall Tour of Alanya
2011
National Road Championships

1st Road race
3rd Time trial

2nd Overall Tour of Trakya

1st Stage 3

10th Overall Tour of Cappadocia
2012
10th Overall Tour of Trakya
10th Grand Prix Dobrich II
2015
4th Overall Tour of Black Sea
7th Overall International Tour of Torku Mevlana
2018
3rd Overall Tour of Mesopotamia
