= Batuhan Özgür =

Turkish cyclist

Personal information
- Full name: Batuhan Özgür
- Born: 1 February 1998 (age 28) Alanya, Turkey
- Height: 1.68 m (5 ft 6 in)
- Weight: 75 kg (165 lb)

Cycling career
- Sport: Cycling
- Current team: Istanbul Büyükșehir Belediye Spor Türkiye
- Discipline: Road
- Role: Rider
- Rider type: Sprinter

Amateur team
- 2017: World Cycling Centre

Professional teams
- 2017–2018: Torku Şekerspor
- 2019: Team Sapura Cycling
- 2020: Spor Toto Cycling Team
- 2021–2022: Salcano–Sakarya BB Team
- 2023: Sofer–Savini Due–OMZ
- 2023: Konya Büyükşehir Belediyespor
- 2024–: Istanbul Büyükșehir Belediye Spor Türkiye

Batuhan Özgür (born 1 February 1998 in Alanya) is a Turkish cyclist, who currently rides for UCI Continental team Istanbul Büyükșehir Belediye Spor Türkiye.

== Major results ==
2015
1st Road race, National Junior Road Championships
2017
4th Road race, National Road Championships
6th Belgrade Banjaluka II
2018
1st Stage 3 Tour of Black Sea
2nd Overall Tour of Mediterrennean

1st Points classification

4th Road race, National Road Championships
5th Overall Tour of Fatih Sultan Mehmet

1st Points classification
1st Stage 2

2019
1st Overall Tour of Mevlana

1st Stages 1 & 2

Les Challenges de la Marche Verte

2nd GP Sakia El Hamra
2nd GP Oued Eddahab

4th Overall Tour of Black Sea

1st Stage 1

4th Bursa Yıldırım Bayezıt Race
4th Odessa Grand Prix
6th Grand Prix Velo Alanya
9th Bursa Orhangazi Race
2020
8th GP Antalya
2021
2nd Road race, National Road Championships
7th Kahramanmaraş Grand Prix
2022
1st Sprints classification, Tour of Turkey
10th Grand Prix Velo Manavgat
2024
5th Road race, National Road Championships
10th GP Yıldızdağı
