= Esra Kürkçü =

Turkish cyclist

Personal information
- Full name: Esra Kürkçü Akgönül
- Born: 5 February 1987 (age 39)

Cycling career
- Sport: Cycling
- Disciplines: Road; Mountain biking
- Role: Rider

Amateur teams
- 2013–2015: Ankara Keçiören Bağlum S.K.
- 2015: Kapadokya B.K.
- 2018: Başkent University Team
- 2019: Bisiklet Sporunu Kalkindirma Kulubu

Esra Kürkçü Akgönül (born 5 February 1987) is a Turkish road cyclist and mountain biker.

== Personal life ==
She graduated from the Faculty of Education at Gazi University, and the Faculty of Education at Başkent University in Ankara.

== Major results ==
2006
1st Cross-country, Balkan Mountain Bike Championships
1st Road race, National Road Championships
2007
3rd Cross-country, National Mountain Bike Championships
2009
1st Road race, National Road Championships
2010
National Road Championships

2nd Road race
3rd Time trial

2011
National Road Championships

2nd Road race
3rd Time trial

2012
National Road Championships

2nd Road race
3rd Time trial

2nd Cross-country, National Mountain Bike Championships
2013
1st Cross-country, National Mountain Bike Championships
National Road Championships

2nd Time trial
3rd Road race

2014
1st Cross-country, National Mountain Bike Championships
2015
National Road Championships

1st Road race
2nd Time trial

1st Cross-country, National Mountain Bike Championships
2018
2nd Road race, National Road Championships
2021
2nd Road race, National Road Championships

== See also ==
- Turkish women in sports
