= Tour of Cartier =

Turkey Cycling Race Game

Race details
- Date: March
- Region: Turkey
- Discipline: Road
- Competition: UCI Europe Tour
- Type: Stage race
- Organiser: Cartier Tour
- Web site: tourofcartiertour.com

History
- First edition: 2018
- Editions: 1 (as of 2018)
- First winner: Cristian Raileanu (MDA)
- Most wins: No repeat winners
- Most recent: Cristian Raileanu (MDA)

Tour of Cartier (officially the Tour of Cartier – East Mediterranean Cycling Prohect) is a stage road cycling race held annually in Turkey since 2018. It is part of UCI Europe Tour in category 2.2. It is organized by the Cartier Tour travel agency, which also organizes the Grand Prix Side and the Grand Prix Alanya.

== Winners ==
Year	Country	Rider	Team
2018	Moldova	Cristian Raileanu	Torku Şekerspor
