= Besik Gavasheli =

Georgian cyclist

Besik "Beso" Gavasheli (born 7 December 1988 in Tbilisi, Georgia) is a former professional Georgian cyclist who is a seven-time Georgian Mountain Bike Champion, a two-time Georgian Individual Time Trial National Champion, and a participant in the first 2015 European Games in Baku.
