= GP Belek =

Men's bicycling race in Turkey

Race details
- Date: January
- Discipline: Road
- Competition: UCI Europe Tour
- Type: One-day race
- Web site: www.cycleinturkey.com

History
- First edition: 2020
- Editions: 1 (as of 2020)
- First winner: Emre Yavuz (TUR) (men); Olha Kulynych (UKR) (women)
- Most wins: No repeat winners
- Most recent: Emre Yavuz (TUR) (men); Olha Kulynych (UKR) (women)

The GP Belek is a men's and women's one-day road cycling race held in Turkey. It is part of UCI Europe Tour in category 1.2.

== Winners ==
=== Men ===
Year	Country	Rider	Team
2020	Turkey	Emre Yavuz	Salcano–Sakarya BB Team

=== Women ===
Year	Country	Rider	Team
2020	Ukraine	Olha Kulynych	Ukraine (national team)
