= Russell Elcock =

Barbadian semi-professional road cyclist

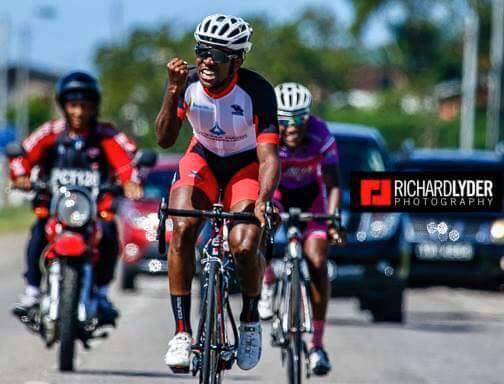

Personal information
- Born: December 6, 1993 (age 32) Barbados
- Height: 1.78 m (5 ft 10 in)
- Weight: 64 kg (141 lb)

Cycling career
- Sport: Cycling
- Discipline: Road
- Role: Rider
- Rider type: Time trialist

Amateur team
- Team Drive Phase Sport

Russell Elcock (born December 6, 1993) is a Barbadian semi-professional road cyclist. He started cycling in 2006 at the age of 12, and has several National and Caribbean Championship titles between 2008 and 2016. He is a Hammer Nutrition sponsored athlete and currently rides for Team Drive Phase Sport based in Trinidad and Tobago. His specialty is the Road Individual Time Trial. He is a University of the West Indies graduate and is a past Queen's College Barbados student.

== Career achievements ==
=== Major results ===
2008
1st Time trial, Caribbean Youth Road Championships
National Youth Road Championships

1st Time trial
2nd Road race

2009
Caribbean Youth Road Championships

1st Time trial
1st Road race

National Youth Road Championships

1st Time trial
1st Road race

1st Individual pursuit, National Youth Track Championships
1st Nation Fun Ride
2010
National Junior Road Championships

1st Time trial
1st Road race

National Junior Track Championships

1st Individual pursuit
2nd Kilo

2nd Time trial, Caribbean Youth Road Championships
3rd Overall Tour of Tobago

1st Young rider classification
1st Stages 2 & 4

2011
National Junior Road Championships

1st Time trial
1st Road race

1st Individual pursuit, National Junior Track Championships
2012
1st Time trial, National Road Championships (course record holder)
2013
National Road Championships

1st Time trial (course record holder)
4th Road race

2nd John T Memorial Cycling Classic - Anguilla
10th Time trial, Caribbean Road Championships
2014
National Road Championships

1st Time trial (course record holder)
4th Road race

5th John T Memorial Cycling Classic - Anguilla
2015
National Road Championships

1st Time trial
3rd Road race

Caribbean Road Championships

2nd Under-23 time trial
3rd Time trial

3rd John T Memorial Classic - Anguilla
2016
National Road Championships

1st Time trial
2nd Road race

1st Overall Trinidad and Tobago Cycling Federation Road Series
2017
2nd Time trial, National Road Championships
3rd John T Memorial Classic - Anguilla
2020
2nd Time trial, National Road Championships

=== Awards ===
- National Sports Council Emerging Athlete of the Year (2009)
- National Cyclist of the Year (2009)
- Barbados Most Outstanding Youth Road Rider of the Year (2009)
- Barbados Most Outstanding Junior Road Rider of the Year (2010, 2011)
- Barbados Most Outstanding Elite Road Rider of the Year (2012, 2013)
- University of the West Indies, Cave Hill Barbados Athlete of the Month (January 2014)
