= Giorgi Nadiradze (footballer) =

Georgian footballer

Personal information
- Full name: Giorgi Nadiradze
- Date of birth: 12 February 1968 (age 58)
- Place of birth: Georgian SSR, Soviet Union
- Position: Defender

Senior career*
Years	Team	Apps	(Gls)
1986–1988	Metallurg Rustavi	63	(0)
1989–1991	Kutaisi	76	(1)
1991–1992	Lokomotivi Samtredia	37	(3)
1992–1993	Margveti Zestafoni	21	(0)
1993–1995	Shevardeni-1906 Tbilisi	44	(1)
Total		241	(5)

International career
1990	Georgia	1	(0)
- * Club domestic league appearances and goals

Giorgi Nadiradze (Georgian: გიორგი ნადირაძე; born 12 February 1968) is a Georgian former footballer who played as a defender and made one appearance for the Georgia national team.

== Career ==
Nadiradze earned his first and only cap for Georgia on 27 May 1990 in the country's first international match, a friendly against Lithuania. The home match, which took place in Tbilisi, finished as a 2–2 draw.

== Career statistics ==
=== International ===
Georgia
Year	Apps	Goals
1990	1	0
Total	1	0
