= Spor Toto Cycling Team =

Turkish cycling team

- Team at the 2026 Tour of Romania

Team information
- UCI code: STC
- Registered: Turkey
- Founded: 2020
- Discipline: Road
- Status: UCI Continental (2020–)

Key personnel
- General manager: Ismail Tuhan
- Team manager: Muhammet Atalay

Team name history
- 2020–: Spor Toto Cycling Team

The Spor Toto Cycling Team is a Turkish professional road bicycle racing team of the Ankara-based club Spor Toto SK that was founded in 2020.

== Team roster ==
As of 13 May 2024.

Rider	Date of birth
Ahmet Örken (TUR)	12 March 1993 (age 33)
Doğukan Arıkan (TUR)	18 August 2002 (age 24)
Ferhat Emişçi (TUR)	25 October 2004 (age 21)
Feritcan Şamlı (TUR)	29 January 1994 (age 32)
Kaan Soylu Özkalbim (TUR)	12 October 2002 (age 23)
Mehmet Kanat (TUR)	12 April 1998 (age 28)

Rider	Date of birth
Mustafa Ayyorkun (TUR)	7 January 2004 (age 22)
Mustafa Tekin (TUR)	6 January 2003 (age 23)
Sait Mustafa Erdemli (TUR)	27 March 2005 (age 21)
Serdar Anıl Depe (TUR)	20 February 1998 (age 28)
Tahir Buğra Yiğit (TUR)	30 September 2001 (age 24)

== Major wins ==
2020
Turkey National Under-23 Time Trial Championships, Oğuzhan Tiryaki
2021
Overall Tour of Mevlana, Anatoliy Budyak

Stage 3, Anatoliy Budyak

== National champions ==
2020
Turkey Under–23 Time Trial, Oğuzhan Tiryaki
