= Tour of Çanakkale =

Turkish multi-day road cycling race

Race details
- Date: End of March
- Region: Çanakkale, Turkey
- English name: Tour of Çanakkale
- Local name(s): Çanakkale Bisiklet Turu (in Turkish)
- Discipline: Road
- Competition: UCI Europe Tour
- Type: Stage race
- Organiser: Turkish Cycling Federation
- Web site: bisiklet.gov.tr/tour-of-canakkale-24-27-mart-2015-2/

History
- First edition: 2015
- Editions: 1
- Final edition: 2015
- First winner: Ahmet Akdilek (TUR)
- Final winner: Ahmet Akdilek (TUR)

The Tour of Çanakkale (Turkish: Çanakkale Bisiklet Turu) was a professional road bicycle racing stage race held in and around the Çanakkale Province in Turkey. It was held once, in 2015 as a 2.2-rated event, and was won by Ahmet Akdilek.

== Winners ==
=== General classification ===
Year	Country	Rider	Team
2015	Turkey	Ahmet Akdilek	Torku Şekerspor

=== Sprints classification ===
Year	Country	Rider	Team
2015	Turkey	Onur Balkan	Brisaspor

=== Mountains classification ===
Year	Country	Rider	Team
2015	Turkey	Miraç Kal	Torku Şekerspor

=== Team classification ===
Year	Team
2015	Torku Şekerspor
