= Sakarya BB Pro Team =

Turkish cycling team

Team information
- UCI code: SBB
- Registered: Turkey
- Founded: 2018
- Discipline: Road
- Status: UCI Continental (2019–)

Key personnel
- Team managers: Aziz Sırnaç; Hasan Bayraktar; Salih Yalizat

Team name history
- 2018 2019–2021 2022–: Salcano–Sakarya; Salcano–Sakarya BB Team; Sakarya BB Pro Team

Sakarya BB Pro Team is a Turkish professional road bicycle racing team which participates in elite races. The team registered with the UCI for the 2019 season.

== Team roster ==
As of 27 February 2022.

Rider	Date of birth
Burak Abay (TUR)	1 January 1996 (age 30)
Soner Akbas (TUR)	14 June 1996 (age 30)
Furkan Akcam (TUR)	11 March 2003 (age 23)
Elchin Asadov (AZE)	12 February 1987 (age 39)
Onur Balkan (TUR)	10 March 1996 (age 30)
Georgios Bouglas (GRE)	17 November 1990 (age 35)
Vitaliy Buts (UKR)	24 October 1986 (age 39)
Serdar Depe (TUR)	20 February 1998 (age 28)

Rider	Date of birth
Sıddık Erturk (TUR)	25 January 2003 (age 23)
Ali Gurbianov (AZE)	23 October 2000 (age 25)
Ata Karaberberoglu (TUR)	9 September 2003 (age 22)
Mykhaylo Kononenko (UKR)	30 October 1987 (age 38)
Batuhan Özgür (TUR)	1 February 1998 (age 28)
Hamed Pasabankhajeh (IRN)	23 September 1988 (age 37)
Cristian Raileanu (MDA)	24 January 1993 (age 33)
Mustafa Sayar (TUR)	22 April 1989 (age 37)

== Major results ==
2019
Grand Prix Justiniano Hotels, Onur Balkan
Stage 3 Tour of Mesopotamia, Onur Balkan
Stage 4 Tour of Mesopotamia, Ahmet Örken
Overall Yavuz Sultan Selim Tour of Black Sea, Onur Balkan

Stages 2 & 3, Onur Balkan

Tour de Ribas, Onur Balkan
Bursa Orhangazi Race, Onur Balkan
Bursa Yildirim Bayezit Race, Mustafa Sayar
Turkey National Road Race Championships, Ahmet Örken
Turkey National U23 Road Race Championships, Halil İbrahim Doğan
Turkey National Time Trial Championships, Ahmet Örken
Grand Prix Velo Erciyes, Onur Balkan
Overall Tour of Central Anatolia, Ahmet Örken

Stage 1, Ahmet Örken
Stage 2, Onur Balkan

Overall Tour of Kayseri, Onur Balkan

Stage 2, Onur Balkan

Stage 3 Tour of Mevlana, Ahmet Örken
Fatih Sultan Mehmet Kirklareli Race, Ahmet Örken
2020
GP Belek, Emre Yavuz
Turkey National Road Race Championships, Onur Balkan
Turkey National Time Trial Championships, Mustafa Sayar
2021
GP Mediterrennean, Onur Balkan
Turkey National Road Race Championships, Onur Balkan

== National Champions ==
2019
Turkish Road Race, Ahmet Örken
Turkish U23 Road Race, Halil İbrahim Doğan
Turkish Time Trial, Ahmet Örken
2020
Turkish Road Race, Onur Balkan
Turkish Time Trial, Mustafa Sayar
2021
Turkish Road Race, Onur Balkan
2022
Azerbaijan Road Race, Elchin Asadov
Azerbaijan Time Trial, Elchin Asadov
Azerbaijan U23 Time Trial, Ali Gurbianov
