= Turkish National Road Race Championships =

National road cycling championship in Turkey

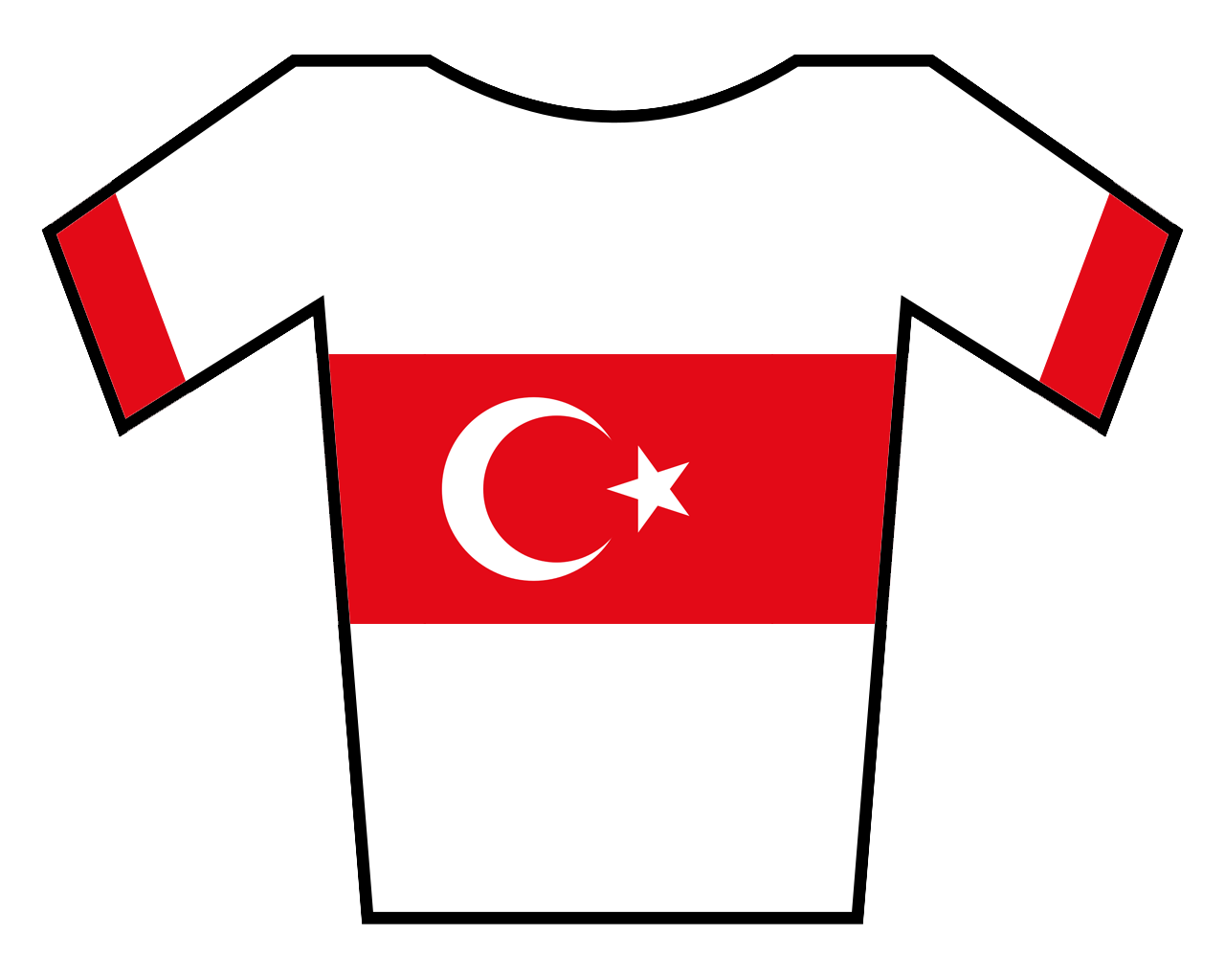
The Champion's Jersey

The Turkish National Road Race Championship is a cycling race organized by the Turkish Cycling Federation. The winners of each event are awarded with a symbolic cycling jersey just like the national flag, these jerseys can be worn by the rider at other road racing events in the country to show their status as national champion. The champion's stripes can be combined into a sponsored rider's team kit design for this purpose. Mustafa Sayar and Azize Bekar are the current champions.

== Multiple winners ==
Since 2005

=== Men ===
Name	Wins	Years
Onur Balkan	5	2016, 2017, 2018, 2020, 2021
Kemal Küçükbay	2	2005, 2011
Miraç Kal	2	2009, 2012
Feritcan Şamlı	2	2014, 2026

=== Men Junior ===
Name	Wins	Years
Recep Ünalan	3	2006, 2007, 2008
Mustafa Ayyorkun	2	2021, 2022
Onur Balkan	2	2013, 2014

=== Women ===
Name	Wins	Years
Esra Kürkçü	3	2006, 2009, 2015
Semra Yetiş	3	2008, 2012, 2014
Azize Bekar	2	2021, 2022
Gül Çelebi	2	2010, 2011
Cansu Türkmenoğlu	2	2016, 2017

=== Women Junior ===
Name	Wins	Years
Merve Demircioğlu	2	2010, 2012

== Men ==
National Road Race Championships
Race details
- Region: Turkey
- Discipline: Road bicycle racing
- Type: One-day

History
- First edition: 1924
- First winner: Cavit Cav (1924)
- Most wins: Cavit Cav (1924–1932)
- Most recent: Feritcan Şamlı

Year	Gold	Silver	Bronze
2005	Kemal Küçükbay		
2006	Bilal Akgül	Kamil Alev	Halil Korkmaz
2007	Uğur Marmara	Mehmet Mutlu	Orhan Şahin
2008	Orhan Şahin	Nazim Bakırcı	Kemal Küçükbay
2009	Miraç Kal	Nazim Bakırcı	Kemal Küçükbay
2010	Behçet Usta	Nevzat Kral	Gökhan Hasta
2011	Kemal Küçükbay (2)	Nazim Bakırcı	Uğur Marmara
2012	Miraç Kal (2)	Mustafa Sayar	Muhammet Eyüp Karagöbek
2013	Nazim Bakırcı	Bekir Baki Akırşan	Miraç Kal
2014	Feritcan Şamlı	Rasim Reis	Gökhan Hasta
2015	Ahmet Akdilek	Bekir Baki Akırşan	Fatih Keleş
2016	Onur Balkan	Ahmet Örken	Recep Ünalan
2017	Onur Balkan (2)	Oguzhan Tiryaki	Ahmet Örken
2018	Onur Balkan (3)	Muhammet Atalay	Mustafa Sayar
2019	Ahmet Örken	Onur Balkan	Feritcan Şamlı
2020	Onur Balkan (4)	Halil Ibrahim Dogan	Emre Yavuz
2021	Onur Balkan (5)	Batuhan Özgür	Ahmet Örken
2022	Mustafa Sayar	Halil Ibrahim Dogan	Onur Balkan
2023	Burak Abay	Ahmet Örken	Tahir Buğra Yiğit
2024	Doğukan Arikan	Serdar Anıl Depe	Burak Abay
2025	Samet Bulut	Burak Abay	Muhammed Erkan
2026	Feritcan Şamlı (2)	Burak Abay	Ahmet Örken

=== Junior ===
Year	Gold	Silver	Bronze
2006	Recep Ünalan		
2007	Recep Ünalan (2)		
2008	Recep Ünalan (3)		
2009	Ali Osman Usta	Adil Kurkut	Mustafa Çarşı
2010	Ahmet Örken	Rasim Reis	Muhammet Keleş
2011	Muhammet Keleş	Salih Terli	Emre Şahin
2012	Lütfullah Tanrıverdi	Serkan Balkan	Emre Şahin
2013	Onur Balkan	Sabri Yıldırım	Mücahit Kürşat Okka
2014	Onur Balkan (2)	Vedat Koç	Emre Torun
2015	Batuhan Özgür	Mustafa Köklü	Celalettin Kal
2016	Sinan Onat Yılmaz	Halil İbrahim Dilek	Batuhan Özgür
2017	Muhammed Ali Uğuz	Ahmet Örencik	Eşref Pekcan
2018	Halil Ibrahim Dogan	Melih Çetin	Süleyman Urcu
2019	Bülent Korkmaz	Melih Çetin	Ali Gök
2020	Kaan Özkalbim	Ali Çelik	Ahmet Maral
2021	Mustafa Ayyorkun	Ali Çelik	Ahmet Maral
2022	Mustafa Ayyorkun (2)	Ramazan Yılmaz	Ferhat Emisci

== Women ==
National Road Race Championships
Race details
- Region: Turkey
- Discipline: Road bicycle racing
- Type: One-day

History
- Most wins: Esra Kürkçü (3); Semra Yetiş (3)
- Most recent: Azize Bekar

Year	Gold	Silver	Bronze
2006	Esra Kürkçü	Özge Tınaz	Senem Güler
2007			
2008	Semra Yetiş		
2009	Esra Kürkçü (2)	Merve Tayfun	Tuğba Karaaslan
2010	Gül Çelebi	Esra Kürkçü	Merve Tayfun
2011	Gül Çelebi (2)	Esra Kürkçü	Merve Tayfun
2012	Semra Yetiş (2)	Esra Kürkçü	Mehtap Demircioğlu
2013	Merve Demircioğlu	Cansu Türkmenoğlu	Esra Kürkçü
2014	Semra Yetiş (3)	Merve Demircioğlu	Beste Nur Keleş
2015	Esra Kürkçü (3)	Semra Yetiş	Ayşenur Turgut
2016	Cansu Türkmenoğlu	Semra Yetiş	Ayse Cakir
2017	Cansu Türkmenoğlu (2)	Hatice Yilmaz	Damla Bayraktar
2018	Ece Calp	Esra Kürkçü	Ayse Cakir
2019	Keziban Koyun	Kubra Bektas	Buse Aygun
2020	Not held due to the COVID-19 pandemic in Turkey		
2021	Azize Bekar	Esra Kürkçü	Ezgi Bayram
2022	Azize Bekar (2)	Keziban Koyun	Fatma Sezer

=== Junior ===
Year	Gold	Silver	Bronze
2009	Duygu Çokal	Seda Öztürk	Gamze Ayaz
2010	Merve Demircioğlu	Ebru Doğan	Gamze Ayaz
2011			
2012	Merve Demircioğlu (2)	Ayşenur Turgut	Ebru Çantaş
2013	Ayşenur Turgut	Arzu Yaraş	Rafiye Başat
2014	Ayşe Çakır	Mesude Şenol	Zeynep Ezgi Tekinoğlu
2015	Mesude Şenol	Ayşe Çakır	Gamze Kıyas
2016	Fatma Sezer	İrem Ceren Akan	Selver Sezer
2017	Keziban Koyun	Yasemin Can	Fatma Sezer
2018			
2019	Azize Bekar	Ezgi Bayram	Sevim Gerçek
2020	Not held due to the COVID-19 pandemic in Turkey		
2021	Funda Taşkın	Almina Öner	Rabiye Osman
2022	Fatmanur Doğan	Funda Taşkın	Ekin Ereke

== See also ==
- Turkish National Time Trial Championships
- National Road Cycling Championships
