= Tour of Mersin =

Turkish multi-day road cycling race

Race details
- Date: April
- Discipline: Road
- Competition: UCI Europe Tour 2.2
- Type: Stage race
- Web site: www.bisiklet.gov.tr

History
- First edition: 2015
- Editions: 8 (as of 2026)
- First winner: Oleksandr Polivoda (UKR)
- Most wins: No repeat winners
- Most recent: Serdar Anıl Depe (TUR)

The Tour of Mersin is a multi-day cycling race held in Turkey. It is part of UCI Europe Tour as a category 2.2 event.

== Winners ==
Year	Country	Rider	Team
2015	Ukraine	Oleksandr Polivoda	Kolss BDC Team
2016	Turkey	Nazim Bakirci	Torku Şekerspor
2017	Belarus	Stanislau Bazhkou	Minsk Cycling Club
2018	Russia	Eduard Vorganov	Minsk Cycling Club
2019	Netherlands	Peter Koning	Bike Aid
2020–2023	No race		
2024	Poland	Marcin Budziński	Mazowsze Serce Polski
2025	South Africa	Stefan de Bod	Terengganu Cycling Team
2026	Turkey	Serdar Anıl Depe	Spor Toto Cycling Team
