= Tour of Mevlana =

International Tour of Torku Mevlana
Race details
- Discipline: Road
- Competition: UCI Europe Tour
- Type: Stage race
- Organiser: Turkish Cycling Federation

History
- First edition: 1990
- Editions: 17 (as of 2021)
- Final edition: 2021
- First winner: Aziz Ay (TUR)
- Most wins: Mert Mutlu (TUR) (2 wins)
- Final winner: Anatoliy Budyak (UKR)

The Tour of Mevlana was a cycling race held in Turkey. The event was first held in 1990, and was on the UCI Europe Tour in 2007 and again, starting in 2015 as a category 2.2.

== Winners ==
Year	Winner	Second	Third
1990	(Turkey) Aziz Ay	(Turkey) Ömer Ali Erikçi	(Turkey) Ayhan Aytekin
1991	(Turkey) Ayhan Aytekin	(Turkey) Ömer Ali Erikçi	(Turkey) Cenk Tufan
1992	(Turkey) Yılmaz Erpamukcu	(Turkey) Erdinç Doğan	(Turkey) Hüseyin Tiğli
1993	(Bulgaria) Krasimir Krilov	(Bulgaria) Alexander Pavlov	(Turkey) Hüseyin Tiğli
1994	(Bulgaria) Plamen Stoyanov	(Bulgaria) Gabriel Toyev	(Ukraine) Alexander Arakelian
1995	(Turkey) Ömer Ali Erikçi	(Bulgaria) Vladimir Sdaçenko	(Turkey) Tamer Vural
1996	(Azerbaijan) Bakev Roman	(Iran) Ghader Mizbani	(Iran) Ahad Kazemi
1997	(Turkey) Cenk Tufan	(Turkey) Ayhan Aytekin	(Turkey) Nevzat Kiral
1998	(Ukraine) Sergey Sergeev	(Bulgaria) Ivailo Gabrovski	(Ukraine) V. Marakyon
1999	(Turkey) Mert Mutlu	(Turkey) Krow Tehenko	(Ukraine) Vassili Zaika
2000	(Turkey) Mert Mutlu	(Turkey) Kemal Küçükbay	(Romania) Gabriel Sorin Pop
2001-2006	No race
2007	(Turkey) Kemal Küçükbay	(Bulgaria) Svetoslav Tchanliev	(Georgia (country)) Giorgi Nadiradze
2008-2014	No race
2015	(Turkey) Ahmet Örken	(Turkey) Bekir Baki Akirsan	(Turkey) Gokhan Hasta
2016-2017	No race
2018	(Turkey) Onur Balkan	(Russia) Ivan Balykin	(Switzerland) Théry Schir
2019	(Turkey) Batuhan Özgür	(Turkey) Ahmet Örken	(Turkey) Onur Balkan
2020	(Russia) Artur Ershov	(Russia) Maxim Piskunov	(France) Vincent Louiche
2021	(Ukraine) Anatoliy Budyak	(Mexico) Ulises Alfredo Castillo	(Colombia) Carlos Quintero

=== Juniors ===
Year	Winner	Second	Third
2010	(Turkey) Mevlüt Erkan	(Turkey) Fatih Keleş	(Bulgaria) Aleksandar Aleksiev
