= Tour of Aegean =

Turkish cycling race

Race details
- Discipline: Road
- Competition: UCI Europe Tour 2.2
- Type: Stage race

History
- First edition: 2015
- Editions: 1
- First winner: Ahmet Örken (TUR)
- Most wins: No repeat winners
- Most recent: Ahmet Örken (TUR)

The Tour of Aegean is a cycling race held in Turkey. It is part of UCI Europe Tour in category 2.2.

== Winners ==
Year	Country	Rider	Team
2015	Turkey	Ahmet Örken	Torku-Şekerspor
