= Giorgi Nadiradze (cyclist) =

Georgian road bicycle racer (born 1987)

Giorgi Nadiradze (born 25 September 1987, Tbilisi) is a Georgian road bicycle racer. He competed at the 2012 Summer Olympics in the Men's road race, but failed to finish.
