= Turkish National Time Trial Championships =

National road cycling championship in Turkey

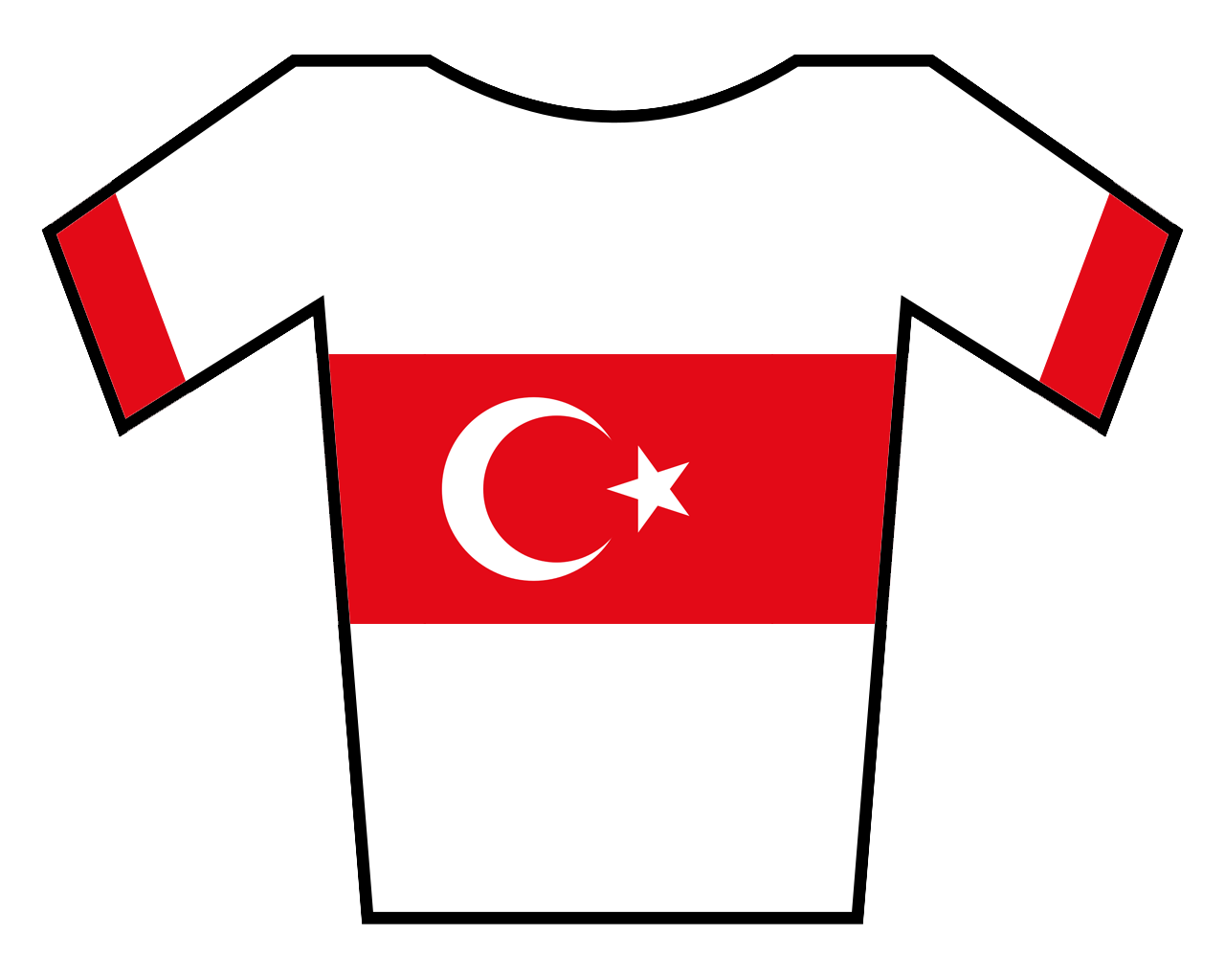
The Champion's Jersey

The Turkish National Time Trial Championship is a cycling race organized by the Turkish Cycling Federation.

== Multiple winners ==
Since 2008

=== Men ===
Name	Wins	Years
Ahmet Örken	8	2014, 2015, 2016, 2017, 2018, 2019, 2021, 2022, 2023, 2024
Kemal Küçükbay	2	2008, 2010

=== Women ===
Name	Wins	Years
Merve Tayfun Marmara	4	2009, 2010, 2011, 2012
Cansu Türkmenoğlu	3	2015, 2016, 2017
Semra Yetiş	2	2013, 2014
Esin Yılmaz	2	2018, 2019

=== Women Junior ===
Name	Wins	Years
Merve Demircioğlu	2	2011, 2012
Ayşe Çakır	2	2014, 2015
Fatmanur Doğan	2	2021, 2022

== Men ==
National Time Trial Championships
Race details
- Region: Turkey
- Discipline: Road bicycle racing
- Type: One-day

History
- Most recent: Ahmet Örken

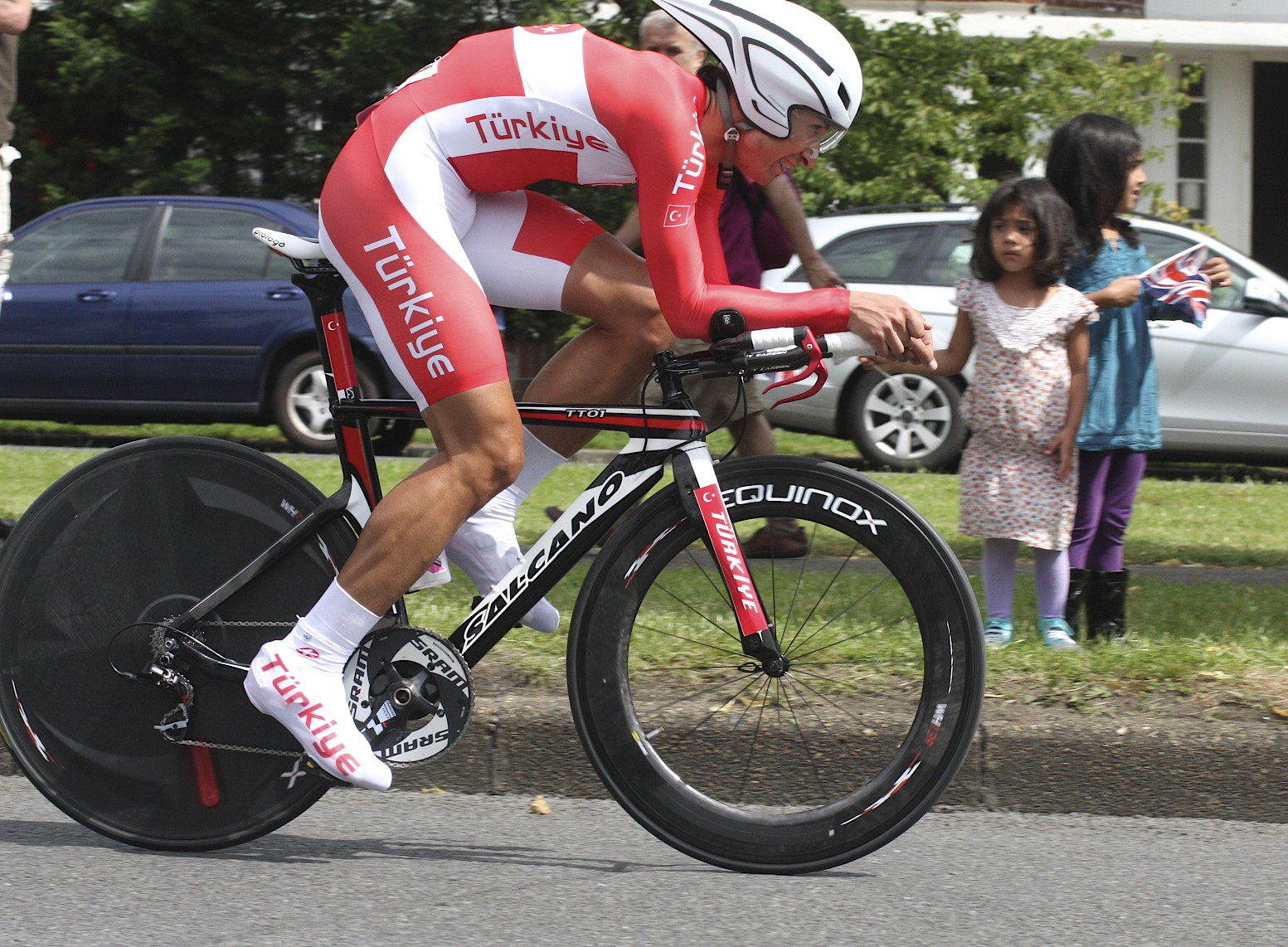

Year	Gold	Silver	Bronze
2008	Kemal Küçükbay	Nevzat Kral	Mert Mutlu
2009	Muhammet Eyüp Karagöbek	Mustafa Sayar	Miraç Kal
2010	Kemal Küçükbay (2)	Muhammet Eyüp Karagöbek	Nevzat Kral
2011	Mehmet Mutlu	Muhammet Eyüp Karagöbek	Kemal Küçükbay
2012	Muhammet Eyüp Karagöbek	Rasim Reis	Uğur Marmara
2013	Bekir Baki Akırşan	~~Mustafa Sayar~~	Feritcan Şamlı
2014	Ahmet Örken	Rasim Reis	Gökhan Hasta
2015	Ahmet Örken (2)	Bekir Baki Akırşan	Rasim Reis
2016	Ahmet Örken (3)	Feritcan Şamlı	Mustafa Sayar
2017	Ahmet Örken (4)	Feritcan Şamlı	Onur Balkan
2018	Ahmet Örken (5)	Muhammet Atalay	Feritcan Şamlı
2019	Ahmet Örken (6)	Onur Balkan	Mustafa Sayar
2020	Mustafa Sayar	Emre Yavuz	Ahmet Örken
2021	Ahmet Örken (7)	Oğuzhan Tiryaki	Mustafa Sayar
2022	Ahmet Örken (8)	Burak Abay	Oğuzhan Tiryaki

=== Junior ===
Year	Gold	Silver	Bronze
2009	Rasim Reis	Bekir Baki Akırşan	Ali Rıza Tanrıverdi
2010	Ahmet Örken	Rasim Reis	Mustafa Çarşı
2011			
2012	Feritcan Şamlı	Lütfullah Tanrıverdi	Muhammet Ali Özçelik
2013	Onur Balkan	Fethullah Köse	Muhammet Ali Özçelik
2014	Alihan Demirbağ	Onur Balkan	Enes Talha Ay
2015	Halil İbrahim Dilek	Mustafa Köklü	Onur Turgut
2016	Onur Turgut	Ahmet Örencik	Batuhan Özgür
2017			
2018	Muhammed Selçuk	Doğukan Abaza	Melih Çetin
2019	Tahir Yiğit	Emir Kaya	Fatih Deniz
2020	Muhammed Çevik	Ali Egin	Kaan Özkalbim
2021	Muhammed Çevik (2)	Mustafa Ayyorkun	Faruk Salman
2022	Ferhat Emisci	Ali Küçük	Ramazan Yılmaz

== Women ==
National Time Trial Championships
Race details
- Region: Turkey
- Discipline: Road bicycle racing
- Type: One-day

History
- Most wins: Merve Tayfun Marmara (4 wins)
- Most recent: Azize Bekar

Year	Gold	Silver	Bronze
2008		Semra Yetiş	
2009	Merve Tayfun Marmara	Senem Güler	Semra Yetiş
2010	Merve Tayfun Marmara (2)	Gül Çelebi	Esra Kürkçü
2011	Merve Tayfun Marmara (3)	Gül Çelebi	Esra Kürkçü
2012	Merve Tayfun Marmara (4)	Semra Yetiş	Esra Kürkçü
2013	Semra Yetiş	Esra Kürkçü	Merve Demircioğlu
2014	Semra Yetiş (2)	Merve Demircioğlu	Özlem Duygu
2015	Cansu Türkmenoğlu	Esra Kürkçü	Semra Yetiş
2016	Cansu Türkmenoğlu (2)	Ayşe Çakır	Beyza Kahveci
2017	Cansu Çelebi (3)	Ayşe Çakır	Beyza Kahveci
2018	Esin Yılmaz	Beyza Kahveci	Cansu Çelebi
2019	Esin Yılmaz (2)	Keziban Koyun	Kübra Bektaş
2020	Not held		
2021	Ezgi Bayram	Azize Bekar	Beste Hepkaradeniz
2022	Azize Bekar	Keziban Koyun	Fatma Sezer

=== Junior ===
Year	Gold	Silver	Bronze
2009	Duygu Çokal	Gamze Ayaz	Beyza Kahveci
2010	Ebru Doğan	Merve Demircioğlu	Beyza Kahveci
2011	Merve Demircioğlu	Ümran Aslan	Aylin Akyay
2012	Merve Demircioğlu (2)	Ayşenur Turgut	Ebru Çantaş
2013	Ayşenur Turgut	Rafiye Başat	Arzu Yaraş
2014	Ayşe Çakır	Zeynep Ezgi Tekinoğlu	Mesude Şenol
2015	Ayşe Çakır (2)	Selver Sezer	İrem Ceren Akan
2016	Fatma Sezer	Selver Sezer	Dilara Gül
2017	Keziban Koyun	Fatma Sezer	Yasemin Can
2018			
2019	Ezgi Bayram	Azize Bekar	Sevim Gerçek
2020	Not held		
2021	Fatmanur Doğan	Funda Taşkın	Rabiye Osman
2022	Fatmanur Doğan (2)	Funda Taşkın	Semanur Kırış

== See also ==
- Turkish National Road Race Championships
- National Road Cycling Championships
