= Tour of Trakya =

Road cycling race in Turkey

Race details
- Date: May
- Region: Tekirdağ Province
- Local name: Uluslararası Trakya Bisiklet Turu
- Discipline: Road
- Competition: UCI Europe Tour
- Type: Stage race
- Organiser: Turkish Cycling Federation

History
- First edition: 2010
- Editions: 3 (as of July 2012)
- First winner: Stefan Hristov (cyclist) (BUL)
- Most recent: Yuriy Metlushenko (UKR)

Tour of Trakya

The Tour of Trakya (Turkish: Uluslararası Trakya Bisiklet Turu) is an international road cycling race organized by the Turkish Cycling Federation at East Thrace in northwestern Turkey. It is part of the UCI Europe Tour having a rating of 2.2.

The beginning of the Tour of Trakya goes back to the 1980s. It gained an international status in 2010 with its first edition held between May 28–31, at which 74 racers competed. The tour consists of four stages in a total length of 524 km (326 mi) and runs through towns around Tekirdağ.

== 2010 ==
The first edition's route was as follows:

1. 161 km (100 mi) (Tekirdağ - Malkara - Hayrabolu - Tekirdağ)
2. 113 km (70 mi) (Tekirdağ - Marmaraereğlisi - Çorlu - Tekirdağ)
3. 166 km (103 mi) (Tekirdağ - Hayrabolu - Lüleburgaz - Muratlı - Tekirdağ)
4. 84 km (52 mi) (Tekirdağ - Şarköy)

== 2011 ==
The second edition's route was as follows:

1. 113 km (70 mi) (Tekirdağ - Marmaraereğlisi - Çorlu - Tekirdağ)
2. 115 km (71 mi) (Çorlu - Çerkezköy - Saray - Vize - Lüleburgaz)
3. 116 km (72 mi) (Lüleburgaz - Babaeski - Kırklareli - Edirne)
4. 143 km (89 mi) (Edirne - Havsa - Babaeski - Hayrabolu - Tekirdağ)

== 2012 ==
The third edition's route was as follows:

1. 113 km (70 mi) (Tekirdağ - Marmaraereğlisi - Çorlu - Tekirdağ)
2. 115 km (71 mi) (Çorlu - Çerkezköy - Saray - Vize - Lüleburgaz)
3. 116 km (72 mi) (Lüleburgaz - Babaeski - Kırklareli - Edirne)
4. 78 km (48 mi) (Edirne criterium race)

== 2013 ==
The race was cancelled or removed from the UCI cycling calendar.

== Winners ==
Year	Country	Rider	Team
2010	Bulgaria	Stefan Hristov	Brisaspor
2011	Germany	Andreas Keuser	Team Worldofbike.gr
2012	Ukraine	Yuriy Metlushenko	Konya–Torku Şekerspor
