= Tour of Ankara =

Turkish multi-day road cycling race

Race details
- Date: May
- Discipline: Road
- Competition: UCI Europe Tour (2.2)
- Type: Stage race

History
- First edition: 2015
- Editions: 3
- Final edition: 2017
- First winner: Nazim Bakırcı (TUR)
- Most wins: No repeat winners
- Final winner: Brayan Ramírez (COL)

The Tour of Ankara was a cycling race held in Turkey, as a 2.2-categorised race on the UCI Europe Tour, between 2015 and 2017.

== Winners ==
Year	Country	Rider	Team
2015	Turkey	Nazim Bakırcı	Torku Şekerspor
2016	Turkey	Serkan Balkan	Brisaspor
2017	Colombia	Brayan Ramírez	Medellín–Inder
