= Radoslav Konstantinov =

Bulgarian cyclist

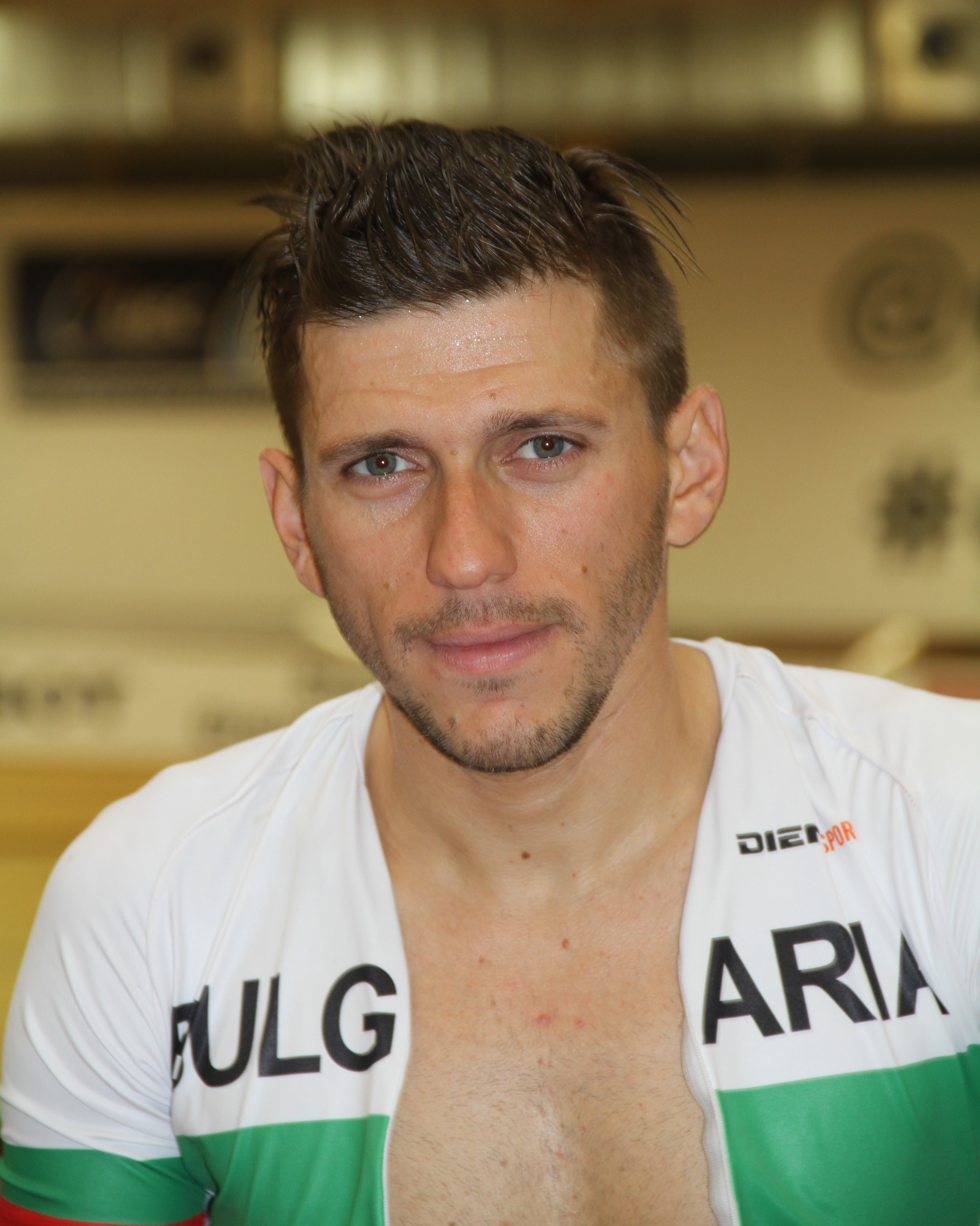

Personal information
- Full name: Radoslav Valentinov Konstantinov
- Born: 31 October 1983 (age 42) Burgas, Bulgaria

Cycling career
- Sport: Cycling
- Discipline: Road
- Role: Rider

Amateur teams
- 2007: Martigues SC
- 2014: Martigues SC–Vivelo
- 2015–2017: Martigues SC–Drag Bicycles
- 2018–2020: Martigues SC–Drag Bicycles
- 2021: Chernomorets Burgas

Professional teams
- 2004–2005: Nesebar
- 2009: Cycling Club Bourgas
- 2017: Hainan Jilun Cycling Team

Major wins
- One-day races and Classics National Time Trial Championships (2017, 2018)

Radoslav Valentinov Konstantinov (born 31 October 1983) is a Bulgarian cyclist, who most recently rode for Bulgarian amateur team Chernomorets Burgas. He competed in the 1 kilometer time trial at the 2004 Summer Olympics.

== Major results ==
2004
1st Stage 8 Tour of Bulgaria
8th Overall Tour of Greece
2005
3rd Overall Tour of Romania
5th Overall Tour of Greece
2006
8th Overall Tour of Bulgaria
2007
Tour of Bulgaria

1st Stages 6 & 9

2nd Road race, National Road Championships
2015
1st Points classification, Bałtyk–Karkonosze Tour
National Road Championships

2nd Time trial
3rd Road race

2016
National Road Championships

2nd Road race
3rd Time trial

2017
National Road Championships

1st Time trial
2nd Road race

1st Stage 2 Tour of Bulgaria North
5th Overall Tour of Bulgaria South
7th Overall Tour de Serbie
2018
National Road Championships

1st Time trial
2nd Road race

8th Overall Grand Prix International de la ville d'Alger
9th Overall Tour du Cameroun
2019
1st Overall Tour du Cameroun
6th Overall In the Steps of Romans
