= Vladimir Koev =

Bulgarian cyclist

Personal information
- Born: 31 August 1979 (age 47) Kazanlak, Bulgaria

Cycling career
- Sport: Cycling
- Current team: Hemus 1896
- Discipline: Road
- Role: Rider

Amateur teams
- 2003–2004: AS Marcoussis
- 2005: VC Rouen 76
- 2021: KK Rozova Dolina
- 2021–: Hemus 1896

Professional teams
- 2006–2007: Hemus 1896–Berneschi
- 2008–2009: Cycling Club Bourgas
- 2010–2011: Hemus 1896–Vivelo

Vladimir Koev (Bulgarian: Владимир Коев) (born 31 August 1979) is a Bulgarian road racing cyclist.

== Doping ==
In June 2006, he tested positive for stanozolol and was suspended for two years. In 2010, he tested positive again, this time for heptaminol. After this, Koev was given an eight-year suspension. All of his results for 2010 and 2011 were stripped. He then served an eight years suspension from June 2010 to June 2018 after testing positive for heptaminol.

== Major results ==
2001
2nd Road race, National Road Championships
2004
1st Overall Tour of Romania
3rd Grand Prix de la ville de Nogent-sur-Oise
2006
2nd Overall Tour of Greece

1st Stage 5

2nd Overall Paths of King Nikola
3rd Time trial, National Road Championships
5th Overall GP Cycliste de Gemenc
10th Overall Presidential Cycling Tour of Turkey
2009
1st Time trial, Balkan Road Championships
2nd Overall Tour of Romania
2nd Road race, National Road Championships
2nd Overall Tour of Bulgaria
3rd Tour of Vojvodina II
7th Overall Tour of Szeklerland

1st Stage 3a

7th Tour of Vojvodina I
2010
1st Overall Paths of King Nikola

1st Stage 1

2nd GP Kranj
~~National Road Championships~~

~~1st Time trial~~
~~2nd Road race~~

~~1st Overall Tour of Romania~~

~~1st Stage 2~~

~~2011~~
~~1st Stage 4 Tour of Romania~~
~~1st Overall Cycling Tour of Sibiu~~

~~1st Stage 3~~

~~National Road Championships~~

~~2nd Road race~~
~~2nd Time trial~~

~~2012~~
~~2nd Grand Prix Dobrich II~~
