= Georgi Petrov Georgiev =

Bulgarian bicycle racer

Personal information
- Full name: Georgi Petrov Georgiev
- Born: 3 August 1985 (age 41) Kazanlak, Bulgaria

Cycling career
- Sport: Cycling
- Current team: Retired
- Discipline: Road
- Role: Rider

Professional teams
- 2004–2005: Koloezdachen Klub Nesebar
- 2009: Heraklion–Nessebar
- 2011: Tuşnad Cycling Team
- 2012–2014: Brisaspor
- 2014: China Wuxi Jilun Cycling Team
- 2014–2016: Brisaspor
- 2016: Team Lvshan Landscape

Georgi Petrov Georgiev (Bulgarian: Георги Петров Георгиев; born 3 August 1985 in Kazanlak) is a Bulgarian former cyclist, who competed professionally between 2004 and 2016 for the Koloezdachen Klub Nesebar, Heraklion–Nessebar, Tuşnad Cycling Team, Brisaspor, China Wuxi Jilun Cycling Team and Team Lvshan Landscape squads.

== Major results ==
2005
1st Stage 6 Tour of Romania
2006
2nd Road race, National Road Championships
2008
1st Road race, National Road Championships
3rd Tour of Vojvodina II
5th Overall Tour of Szeklerland
2010
1st Stage 2 Tour of Bulgaria
1st Stage 6 Tour du Maroc
3rd Overall Tour of Alanya

1st Stage 2

3rd Overall Tour of Trakya
5th Overall Tour of Marmara
9th Overall Tour of Victory

1st Stage 4

2011
4th Overall Tour of Romania
9th Overall Tour of Szeklerland
2012
2nd Road race, National Road Championships
3rd Overall Tour of Bulgaria
7th Overall Tour of Szeklerland
2013
1st Overall Tour of Szeklerland

1st Stage 2

2nd Road race, National Road Championships
6th Overall Tour of Bulgaria

1st Stage 3

2014
2nd Road race, National Road Championships
2nd Overall Tour of Szeklerland
4th Overall Tour du Maroc
Challenge du Prince

6th Trophée de la Maison Royale
9th Trophée de l'Anniversaire

8th Overall Tour de Serbie

1st Stage 3

8th Overall Tour of Fuzhou
2015
4th Overall Tour of Szeklerland
4th Overall Tour of Bulgaria
6th Overall Tour of Black Sea
7th Overall Tour of Ankara
9th Overall Tour de Serbie
2016
1st Road race, National Road Championships
1st Stage 2 Tour de Serbie
2nd Overall Tour of Ankara

1st Mountains classification

10th Overall Tour of Mersin
