= Daniel Petrov (cyclist) =

Bulgarian cyclist

Personal information
- Born: 31 October 1982 (age 43) Gabrovo, Bulgaria

Cycling career
- Sport: Cycling
- Current team: Retired
- Discipline: Road
- Role: Rider

Professional teams
- 2004–2007: Würth–Atum Bom Petisco–Tavira
- 2008–2009: Cycling Club Bourgas
- 2009–2011: Hemus 1896–Troyan
- 2012: Tuşnad Cycling Team

Daniel Petrov (born 31 October 1982) is a Bulgarian former professional road cyclist. He competed in the men's individual road race at the 2008 Summer Olympics.

== Major results ==
2002
2nd Overall Tour of Turkey
2003
1st Road race, National Road Championships
1st Stage 3 Tour of Turkey
2005
2nd Road race, National Road Championships
2006
4th Overall Tour of Bulgaria
2007
5th Overall Tour of Bulgaria
8th Overall Tour de Luxembourg
2008
1st Overall Tour of Chalkidiki

1st Stage 1

4th Plovdiv Cup
7th Banja Luka–Belgrade I
8th Grand Prix Bourgas
2010
7th Banja Luka–Belgrade I
2011
8th Overall Tour of Romania
