= Svetoslav Tchanliev =

Bulgarian bicycle racer

Personal information
- Full name: Svetoslav Tchanliev Kirilov
- Born: 3 August 1973 (age 53)

Cycling career
- Sport: Cycling
- Current team: Retired
- Discipline: Road
- Role: Rider

Professional teams
- 2006: Cycling Club Bourgas
- 2009: Cycling Club Bourgas
- 2009–2011: Hemus 1896–Troyan

Svetoslav Tchanliev Kirilov (Bulgarian: Светослав Чанлиев; born 3 August 1973) is a Bulgarian former road cyclist. He most notably won the 2005 Tour of Turkey. He has one daughter, named Stella Svetoslav Chanlieva, born in 2001.

== Major results ==
2000
3rd Time trial, National Road Championships
2002
1st Stage 7 Tour of Turkey
2003
1st Stage 4 Tour of Turkey
2nd Overall International Tour of Hellas

1st Stage 3

National Road Championships

3rd Road race
3rd Time trial

8th Overall Paths of King Nikola
2004
1st Stage 5 Tour de Serbie
2nd Road race, National Road Championships
2nd Sacrifice Cup
4th Overall Grand Prix Sunny Beach
2005
1st Overall Tour of Turkey

1st Stages 2,3 & 5

3rd Overall Grand Prix Sunny Beach

1st Stage 2

3rd Road race, National Road Championships
9th Overall Paths of King Nikola
2006
1st Stage 4 Tour d'Egypte
2007
2nd Overall International Paths of Victory Tour

1st Stage 1

8th Overall Tour of Turkey
2008
3rd Road race, National Road Championships
3rd Overall Tour of Szeklerland
3rd Overall Romanian Cycling Tour
5th Overall Tour of Bulgaria
7th Grand Prix Bourgas
9th Overall Tour d'Egypte

1st Stage 6

10th Overall Tour of Azerbaijan (Iran)
2009
5th Tour of Vojvodina II
2010
4th Road race, National Road Championships
10th Overall Tour of Victory
2011
3rd Overall Tour of Bulgaria
9th Overall Tour of Trakya
