= Martin Grashev =

Bulgarian cyclist

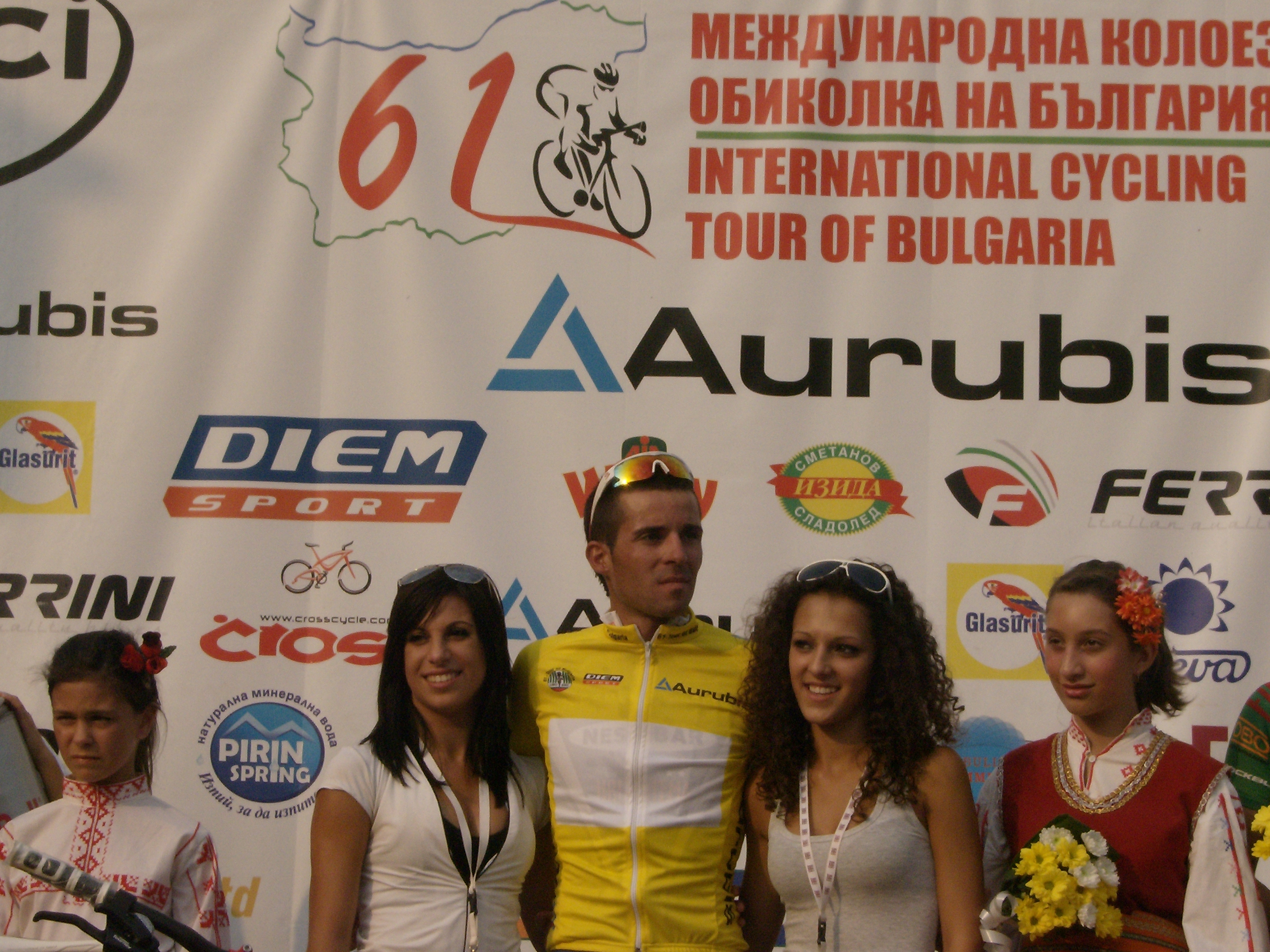

Personal information
- Full name: Martin Grashev Mladenov
- Born: 14 January 1987 (age 39)

Cycling career
- Sport: Cycling
- Discipline: Road
- Role: Rider

Amateur teams
- 2007–2008: Nessebar
- 2010–2012: Nessebar

Professional team
- 2009: Heraklion–Nessebar

Martin Grashev Mladenov (Bulgarian: Мартин Грашев Младенов) (born 14 January 1987) is a Bulgarian cyclist.

== Palmares ==
2009
3rd Tour of Vojvodina I
2011
2nd Overall Tour of Bulgaria

1st Stage 2b

3rd Overall Tour of Szeklerland

1st Stage 3a

2012
1st Grand Prix Dobrich I
