= Ivailo Gabrovski =

Bulgarian racing cyclist

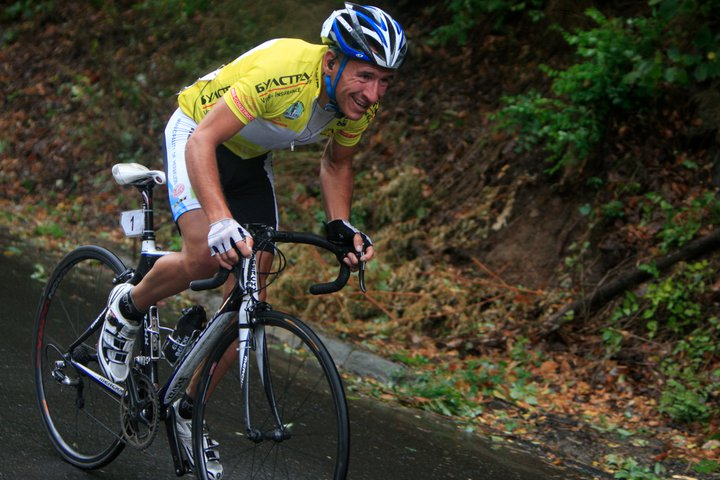

Personal information
- Full name: Ivailo Gabrovski
- Born: January 31, 1978 (age 48) Sofia, Bulgaria

Cycling career
- Sport: Cycling
- Current team: Retired
- Discipline: Road
- Role: Rider

Amateur teams
- 2008: Cosmote Kastro
- 2011: CC Nessebar

Professional teams
- 2000–2002: Jean Delatour
- 2003: MBK-Oktos
- 2004: Oktos
- 2005: Miche
- 2006: Flanders
- 2007: Storez Ledecq Materiaux
- 2009: Heraklion–Nessebar
- 2012: Konya–Torku Şekerspor
- 2014: China Wuxi Jilun Cycling Team

Major wins
- Tour of Bulgaria 5 times Tour of Turkey 2007; Tour de l'Ain 2001

Ivailo Gabrovski (Bulgarian: Ивайло Габровски; born January 31, 1978) is a Bulgarian former racing cyclist. He holds the record for most Tour of Bulgaria wins, which he won 5 times.

== Career ==
Gabrovski was born in Sofia. In April 2012, he won the third stage of the Tour of Turkey. Racing for Turkish Continental team Konya–Torku Şekerspor, Gabrovski accelerated 8 kilometers from the finish line in the first mountain top finish stage in the race's history. He went on to win solo, with a gap of 1 minute and 29 seconds to his nearest competitor, Alexsandr Dyachenko of Astana. With that win, he took the leader's jersey, which he held for the rest of the race to take the overall title. Later that year he lost his title since he tested positive for EPO.

Gabrovski speaks French fluently, a skill that he attributes to his beginnings in professional cycling, where he was part of the Jean Delatour team.

== Doping ==
In 2003 he was prevented from racing the 3 Days of West Flanders when he came in over the hematocrit limit. In 2005, he was prevented from riding the world championship in Madrid after failing a blood test conducted by the UCI. He claimed at that time that being an athlete, his body was producing more red blood cells than the average person.

In 2012, Gabrovski tested positive for EPO at that year's Presidential Cycling Tour of Turkey, which he won. He was banned for two years and lost the title. Alexsandr Dyachenko, who had finished second, was awarded the victory.

== Major results ==
2001
1st Time trial, National Road Championships
1st Overall Tour de l'Ain
2nd Overall Tour du Poitou-Charentes

1st Stage 1

2nd Gran Premio Città di Camaiore
3rd Druivenkoers-Overijse
2002
1st Road race, National Road Championships
2003
National Road Championships

1st Time trial
2nd Road race

1st Overall Tour of Bulgaria

1st Prologue, Stages 5 & 7

2004
1st Time trial, National Road Championships
1st Overall Tour of Bulgaria

1st Stages 5 & 9

1st Stage 1 Circuit de Lorraine
2005
National Road Championships

1st Time trial
1st Road race

1st Overall Tour of Romania
2006
National Road Championships

1st Time trial
1st Road race

1st Overall Tour of Bulgaria

1st Stages 1, 5b & 8

1st Overall Tour of Serbia

1st Stages 3 & 6

3rd Grote Prijs Stad Zottegem
2007
National Road Championships

1st Time trial
1st Road race

1st Overall Tour of Turkey

1st Stages 3 & 6

1st Overall Tour de Liège

1st Stage 6

1st Romsée–Stavelot–Romsée
1st Stage 3a Tour of Bulgaria
2008
1st Time trial, National Road Championships
1st Overall The Paths of King Nikola

1st Stage 4

1st Overall Tour of Bulgaria
1st Stage 3 Tour of Serbia
2009
National Road Championships

1st Road race
3rd Time trial

1st Overall Tour of Bulgaria

1st Stages 1 & 2

1st Grand Prix of Sharm el-Sheikh
1st Tour of Vojvodina II
3rd Overall Tour of Serbia
2011
1st Overall Tour of Bulgaria

1st Stage 8a

2012
~~1st Overall Tour of Turkey~~

~~1st Stage 3~~

3rd Overall Tour of Morocco
