= Evgeniy Gerganov =

Bulgarian bicycle racer

Personal information
- Full name: Evgeniy Balev Gerganov
- Born: 1 October 1975 (age 51) Sliven, Bulgaria
- Height: 1.70 m (5 ft 7 in)
- Weight: 60 kg (132 lb)

Cycling career
- Sport: Cycling
- Current team: Retired
- Discipline: Road
- Role: Rider

Professional teams
- 2006–2009: Cycling Club Bourgas
- 2010: Hemus 1896 Vivelo
- 2011: Konya–Şekerspor–Torku–Vivelo
- 2012: Tuşnad Cycling Team

Evgeniy Balev Gerganov (Bulgarian: Евгени Балев Герганов; born 1 October 1975) is a Bulgarian former professional road cyclist. He represented his nation Bulgaria at the 2008 Summer Olympics.

== Career ==
Born in Sliven, Gerganov qualified for the Bulgarian squad in the men's road race at the 2008 Summer Olympics in Beijing by receiving one half of the team's two berths from UCI Europe Tour. Passing through the 180-km mark, Gerganov could not achieve a best possible result with a severe fatigue under Beijing's intense heat and a lapped violation over the race leader, as he failed to complete a grueling race against a vast field of nearly a hundred cyclists.

== Major results ==
2004
3rd Time trial, National Road Championships
2005
3rd Overall International Presidency Turkey Tour

1st Stage 4

2007
1st Overall Tour of Bulgaria
2nd Time trial, National Road Championships
3rd Overall Grand Prix Cycliste de Gemenc
2008
3rd Time trial, National Road Championships
8th Overall Tour of Bulgaria
2009
10th Overall Turul României
2010
1st Overall Tour of Szeklerland
5th Road race, National Road Championships
10th Overall Tour of Bulgaria

1st Stage 7a

2011
4th Overall Tour of Bulgaria
5th Overall Tour of Greece
2012
4th Road race, National Road Championships
2013
5th Road race, National Road Championships
9th Overall Tour of Szeklerland
10th Overall Tour of Bulgaria
