= Danail Petrov =

Bulgarian racing cyclist

Personal information
- Full name: Danail Andonov Petrov; Bulgarian: Данаил Андонов Петров
- Born: 5 February 1978 (age 48) Kazanlak, Bulgaria
- Height: 1.72 m (5 ft 8 in)
- Weight: 63 kg (139 lb)

Cycling career
- Sport: Cycling
- Current team: Retired
- Discipline: Road
- Role: Rider
- Rider type: All-rounder

Professional teams
- 2000–2002: Gresco–Tavira
- 2003–2004: Carvalhelhos–Boavista
- 2005–2006: Milaneza–Maia
- 2007–2008: Benfica
- 2009–2010: Madeinox–Boavista
- 2011: Konya–Şekerspor–Torku–Vivelo
- 2012–2013: Caja Rural

Major wins
- National Road Race Championships (2010–2013); Troféu Joaquim Agostinho (2006)

Danail Andonov Petrov (Bulgarian: Данаил Андонов Петров; born 5 February 1978 in Kazanlak) is a Bulgarian former road bicycle racer.

== Major results ==
2001
3rd Road race, National Road Championships
2002
1st Stage 4 Tour de Minho
1st Stage 10 Volta a Portugal
2004
1st Overall Volta ao Alentejo

1st Stage 3

3rd Overall Troféu Joaquim Agostinho

1st Stage 1

3rd Road race, National Road Championships
2005
3rd Overall Troféu Joaquim Agostinho

1st Stage 3

3rd Subida al Naranco
2006
1st Overall Troféu Joaquim Agostinho

1st Stage 3

1st Stage 2 Tour of Bulgaria
2nd Road race, National Road Championships
2007
6th Overall Vuelta a Asturias
7th Overall Clásica Internacional de Alcobendas
8th Subida a Urkiola
8th Subida al Naranco
2008
1st Stage 3 GP CTT Correios de Portugal
1st Stage 1 Troféu Joaquim Agostinho
2nd Overall Tour of Bulgaria

1st Stages 6 & 7

5th Overall Tour of Turkey
7th Overall The Paths of King Nikola
2009
2nd Overall GP CTT Correios de Portugal
2010
1st Road race, National Road Championships
5th Prueba Villafranca de Ordizia
2011
1st Road race, National Road Championships
3rd Overall Tour of Trakya
5th Overall Tour of Isparta

1st Stage 3

7th Overall Tour of Cappadocia
8th Overall Tour of Bulgaria
10th Overall Tour du Maroc
2012
1st Road race, National Road Championships
2nd Overall Tour of Turkey
7th Gran Premio Miguel Indurain
2013
1st Road race, National Road Championships
4th Circuito de Getxo
7th GP Miguel Indurain
8th Vuelta a la Comunidad de Madrid
8th Overall Tour of Turkey
