= Spas Gyurov =

Bulgarian cyclist

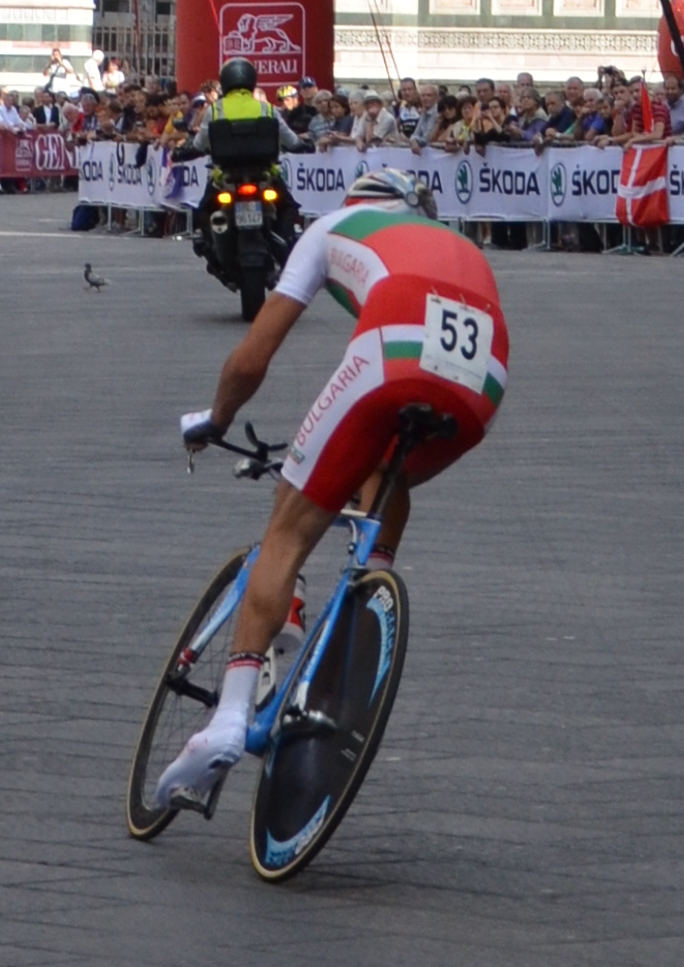
- Spas Gyurov in 2013 UCI Road World Championships, Florence, Italy

Personal information
- Full name: Spas Stamenov Gyurov
- Born: 7 February 1986 (age 40) Pazardjik, Bulgaria

Cycling career
- Sport: Cycling
- Current team: Team Snooze
- Discipline: Road
- Role: Rider

Amateur teams
- 2006–2008: Nessebar
- 2010–2012: Nessebar
- 2018–: Team Snooze

Professional teams
- 2005: Nessebar
- 2009: Heraklion–Nessebar

Spas Gyurov (Bulgarian: Спас Гюров) is a Bulgarian road bicycle racer. He competed at the 2012 Summer Olympics in the Men's road race, but failed to finish.

== Major results ==
2007
1st Road race, National Under-23 Road Championships
3rd Road race
2009
3rd Road race, National Road Championships
5th H.H. Vice President Cup
10th Tour of Vojvodina II
2012
2nd Time trial, National Road Championships
5th Grand Prix Dobrich I
2013
National Road Championships

1st Time trial
3rd Road race

2nd Overall Tour of Bulgaria
2020
1st Time trial, National Road Championships
2021
National Road Championships

1st Road race
2nd Time trial
