= Stefan Hristov =

Stefan Hristov may refer to:

- Stefan Hristov (footballer) (born 1989), Bulgarian footballer
- Stefan Hristov (cyclist) (born 1985), Bulgarian cyclist
