= Sibiu Cycling Tour =

Romanian multi-day road cycling race

Race details
- Date: July
- Region: Sibiu, Romania
- Local name: Turul Ciclist al Sibiului
- Discipline: Road
- Competition: UCI Europe Tour
- Type: Stage race
- Web site: ciclism.sibiu.ro

History
- First edition: 2011
- Editions: 16 (as of 2026)
- First winner: Alessio Marchetti (ITA)
- Most wins: Giovanni Aleotti (ITA) (2 wins)
- Most recent: Lorenzo Finn (ITA)

The Sibiu Cycling Tour (Cycling Tour of Sibiu until 2015) is a 2.1 category professional bicycle road race held in Sibiu, Romania. Its first edition took place in July 2011, as part of the UCI Europe Tour. The race is organised with the support of the local council as well as the regional council of Sibiu. Held entirely around the city, the race normally runs over four days including a prologue on the cobbled streets of the city, and two climbing stages, one on the Transfăgărășan road to Bâlea Lake and a second to the mountain resort of Păltiniș.

== Overall winners ==
Year	Country	Rider	Team
2011	Italy	Alessio Marchetti (Note: Bulgaria's Vladimir Koev (Konya–Şekerspor–Torku–Vivelo) initially won the race, but he was stripped of all his results from 2010 and 2011, following a positive drugs test in June 2010.)	ASD Centro Revisioni Cerone
2012	Spain	Víctor de la Parte	SP Tableware
2013	Italy	Davide Rebellin	CCC–Polsat–Polkowice
2014	Croatia	Radoslav Rogina	Adria Mobil
2015	Italy	Mauro Finetto	Southeast Pro Cycling
2016	Bulgaria	Nikolay Mihaylov	CCC–Sprandi–Polkowice
2017	Colombia	Egan Bernal	Androni–Sidermec–Bottecchia
2018	Colombia	Iván Sosa	Androni Giocattoli–Sidermec
2019	Costa Rica	Kevin Rivera	Androni Giocattoli–Sidermec
2020	Austria	Gregor Mühlberger	Bora–Hansgrohe
2021	Italy	Giovanni Aleotti	Bora–Hansgrohe
2022	Italy	Giovanni Aleotti	Bora–Hansgrohe
2023	Great Britain	Mark Donovan	Q36.5 Pro Cycling Team
2024	Germany	Florian Lipowitz	Bora–Hansgrohe
2025	United States	Matthew Riccitello	Israel–Premier Tech
2026	Italy	Lorenzo Finn	Red Bull–Bora–Hansgrohe

== Classifications ==
As of the 2018 edition, the jerseys worn by the leaders of the individual classifications are:
– Yellow Jersey – The Yellow Jersey is worn by the leader of the overall classification.
– White Jersey – The White Jersey is worn by the leader of the overall mountains classification.(white jersey prior to 2018)
– Orange Jersey – Worn by the best rider under 23 years of age on the overall classification.
– Blue Jersey – Worn by the leader of the sprints classification.
– Red Jersey – The Red Jersey presented to the leading Romanian rider on the overall classification.
– Green Jersey – Presented to the leader of the points classification. (Previously wore a white jersey)
Additionally
– Grey Jersey – To the team leading the team classification (Not worn in race)
From 2018 the red jersey and green jerseys were presented on the podium only and not worn in race.

== Editions ==
=== 2011 ===
The Cycling Tour of Sibiu 2011 took place from 6 to 10 July 2011, organised as a 2.2 race on the UCI Europe Tour, over a total distance of 451 kilometres (280 miles). The race included five days of competition including a team time trial in the center of Sibiu. A total of 20 teams took part, with a total prize money of 26,000 euros. The race was originally won by Vladimir Koev but he was later stripped of all results from 2010 and 2011 following a positive test at the 2010 Tour of Romania.

List of stages
Stage	Date	Course	Distance	Type	Winner
1	6 July	Poplaca – Sibiu	10.6 km (7 mi)	Team time trial	RC Arbö–Gourmetfein–Wels
2	7 July	Sibiu – Mediaș – Sighișoara – Agnita – Cincu – Avrig	197 km (122 mi)	Flat stage	Maksym Vasilyev (UKR)
3	8 July	Mediaș – Bârghiș – Șeica Mare – Ocna Sibiului – Sibiu – Păltiniș	145 km (90 mi)	Mountain stage	Alessio Marchetti (ITA)
4	9 July	Historic Centre of Sibiu	4.4 km (3 mi)	Time trial	Christian Poos (LUX)
5	10 July	Sibiu – Cisnădioara – Cisnădie – Sadu – Avrig – Bâlea Lake	94 km (58 mi)	Mountain stage	Riccardo Zoidl (AUT)

Final Classifications
	Cyclist	Team	Time
DSQ	~~Vladimir Koev~~ (BUL)	~~Konya–Şekerspor–Torku–Vivelo~~	~~11h 32' 48"~~
1	Alessio Marchetti (ITA)	Centro Revisioni Cerone	11h 33' 40"
2	Oleksandr Sheydyk (UKR)	ISD–Lampre Continental	+ 35"
3	Sascha Weber (GER)	Differdange–Magic–SportFood.de	+ 59"
King of the Mountains Jersey	Anatoliy Pakhtusov (UKR)	ISD–Lampre Continental	-
Best U23 Rider	Artem Topchanyuk (UKR)	ISD–Lampre Continental	-
Points classification	Ricardo Pichetta (ITA)	Centro Revisioni Cerone	-
Sprints Classification	Anatoli Kashtan (UKR)	Centro Revisioni Cerone	-

=== 2012 ===
The Cycling Tour of Sibiu 2012 took place from 4 to 8 July 2012, organised as a 2.2 race on the UCI Europe Tour. The race for the first time included an opening prologue time trial and covered a total of 432.9 kilometres (269.0 miles).

List of stages
Stage	Date	Course	Distance	Type	Winner
P	4 July	Sibiu – Sibiu	2.4 km (1 mi)	Time trial	Jon Bergsland (NOR)
1	5 July	Sibiu – Paltanis	184 km (114 mi)	Mountain stage	Víctor de la Parte (ESP)
2	6 July	Historic Centre of Sibiu	10.2 km (6 mi)	Team time trial	Kolss Cycling Team
3	7 July	Sibiu – Bâlea Lake	90.1 km (56 mi)	Mountain stage	Martin Haring (SLO)
4	8 July	Sibiu – Sibiu	146.2 km (91 mi)	Flat stage	Gabor Kasa (SER)

Final Classifications
	Cyclist	Team	Time
1	Víctor de la Parte (ESP)	SP Tableware	11h 34' 30"
2	Matija Kvasina (CRO)	Tuşnad Cycling Team	+ 17"
3	Artem Topchanyuk (UKR)	SP Tableware	+ 56"
Best U23 Rider	Anatoliy Sosnitskiy (UKR)	Kolss Cycling Team	-
Sprints Classification	Gabor Kasa (SER)	Serbian National Team	-
Best Romanian Rider	George Stancu (ROM)	CS Otopeni	-

=== 2013 ===
The Cycling Tour of Sibiu 2013 took place from 11 to 14 July. For the third edition the race was upgraded to UCI category 2.1 allowing UCI Pro Continental Teams to take part. Three Pro Continental teams accepted invites, CCC–Polsat–Polkowice, Androni Giocattoli–Venezuela and Vini Fantini–Selle Italia although Vini Fantini would later withdraw after positive doping tests at the 2013 Giro d'Italia. At 480 kilometres (300 miles), the race was the longest to date despite being reduced to four days, with two stages taking place on the final day.

List of stages
Stage	Date	Course	Distance	Type	Winner
P	11 July	Sibiu – Sibiu	2.5 km (2 mi)	Time trial	Maroš Kováč (SVK)
1	12 July	Sibiu – Bâlea Lake	142.8 km (89 mi)	Mountain stage	Davide Rebellin (ITA)
2	13 July	Sibiu – Paltanis	184.5 km (115 mi)	Mountain stage	Markus Eibegger (AUT)
3a	14 July	Cisnădie - Muzeul Tehnicii Populare	11.4 km (7 mi)	Time trial	Stefan Schumacher (GER)
3b	14 July	Sibiu – Sibiu	138.8 km (86 mi)	Intermediate stage	Mattia Gavazzi (ITA)

Final Classifications
	Cyclist	Team	Time
1	Davide Rebellin (ITA)	CCC–Polsat–Polkowice	12h 25' 23"
2	Matija Kvasina (CRO)	Gourmetfein–Simplon	+ 58"
3	Constantino Zaballa (ESP)	Christina Watches–Onfone	+ 1' 21"
Best U23 Rider	Lukas Pöstlberger (AUT)	Gourmetfein–Simplon	-
Sprints Classification	Gedimas Kaupas (LIT)	Differdange–Losch	-
Best Romanian Rider	Adrian Nitu (ROM)	Romanian National Team	-

=== 2014 ===
The 2014 Sibiu Tour took place between 17 and 20 July. At 500.9 kilometres (311.2 miles), the race was the longest to date, and once more featured the traditional cobbled prologue and stages to Bâlea Lake and Paltanis. Returning to the race for the first time since 2012 was a team time trial on the final day. The 2014 race featured two Pro Continental teams, CCC–Polsat–Polkowice and Androni Giocattoli–Venezuela along with 20 continental and national teams competing for a prize fund of €29,889.

Stage Information
Stage	Date	Course	Distance	Type	Winner
P	17 July	Sibiu – Sibiu	2.3 km (1 mi)	Time trial	Olivier Pardini (BEL)
1	18 July	Sibiu – Bâlea Lake	162.5 km (101 mi)	Mountain stage	Radoslav Rogina (CRO)
2	19 July	Sibiu – Sebes – Păltiniș	160.4 km (100 mi)	Mountain Stage	Branislau Samoilau (BLR)
3a	20 July	Sibiu – Poplaca – Sibiu	17 km (11 mi)	Team time trial	CCC–Polsat–Polkowice
3b	20 July	Sibiu – Mediaș – Sibiu	158.7 km (99 mi)	Intermediate Stage	Marco Zanotti (ITA)

Final Classifications
	Cyclist	Team	Time
1	Radoslav Rogina (CRO)	Adria Mobil	12h 58' 26"
2	Davide Rebellin (ITA)	CCC–Polsat–Polkowice	+ 1' 01"
3	Primož Roglič (SLO)	Adria Mobil	+ 1' 07"
Best U23 Rider	Domen Novak (SLO)	Adria Mobil	-
Sprints Classification	Bram Nolten (NED)	Parkhotel Valkenburg Continental Team	-
Best Romanian Rider	Oleg Berdos (ROM)	Tuşnad Cycling Team	-

=== 2015 ===
The 2015 Tour of Sibiu took place between 1 and 5 July. For the first time it was raced over 5 days, and moved forward in the calendar by nearly three weeks. It was expected that the teams of all the jersey winners and stage winners from 2014, Adria Mobil, CCC–Sprandi–Polkowice, Verandas Willems and Parkhotel Valkenburg Continental Team, would compete again in 2015. Adria Mobil later withdrew to be replaced by Southeast Pro Cycling taking the number of pro-continental teams in the race to four. The race was won by Mauro Finetto who won the mountain stage to Paltanis and was able to retain his jersey through to the finale.

=== 2016 ===
The 2016 Sibiu Cycling Tour took place between 6 and 10 July having moved forward one week due to the local elections. The race opened with the traditional prologue and for the first time featured a mountain time trial to Bâlea Lake. This edition featured four pro-continental teams including for the first time, a British team, ONE Pro Cycling.

The race was won by Nikolay Mihaylov after he was part of a breakaway on Stage 2. The race was notable for its first Romanian stage winner, Andrei Nechita, who won the opening prologue, and also its first Australian stage winner Steele Von Hoff.

=== 2017 ===
The 2017 Sibiu Cycling Tour took place between 5 and 9 July, featuring a traditional parcours of opening prologue, two intermediate and two mountain stages. The peloton featured three professional Continental teams, 17 Continental teams and a Romanian national team, and for the first time, teams from North America. The race was won by Egan Bernal who became the first Colombian winner.

=== 2018 ===
The 2018 Sibiu Cycling Tour took place between 5 and 8 July, featuring a traditional parcours of opening prologue, two mountain stages and for the first time since 2014, a team time trial. The peloton featured three professional Continental teams, fourteen Continental teams and two national teams.
