= Nikolay Mihaylov (cyclist) =

Bulgarian cyclist (born 1988)

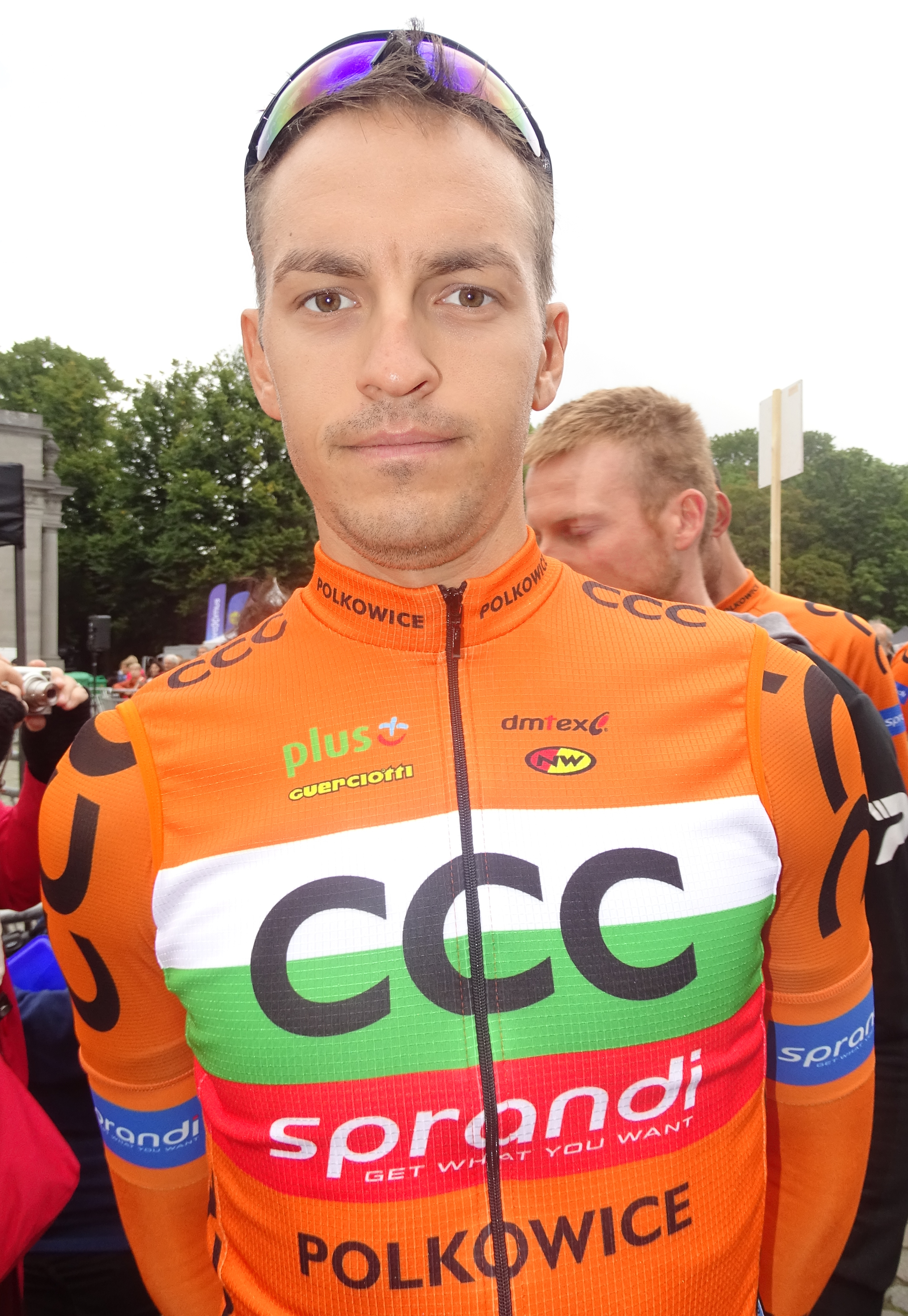
- Mihaylov at the 2015 Brussels Cycling Classic

Personal information
- Full name: Nikolay Mihaylov
- Born: 8 April 1988 (age 38) Svilengrad, Bulgaria
- Height: 1.83 m (6 ft 0 in)
- Weight: 70 kg (154 lb)

Cycling career
- Sport: Cycling
- Discipline: Road
- Role: Rider
- Rider type: Time trialist

Amateur team
- 2020–2021: KK Drag

Professional teams
- 2012–2017: CCC–Polkowice
- 2018: Delko–Marseille Provence KTM
- 2019: Efapel

Major wins
- One-day races and Classics National Time Trial Championships (2011–2012, 2015) National Road Race Championships (2014–2015, 2017–2018)

Nikolay Mihaylov (Bulgarian: Николай Михайлов; born 8 April 1988) is a Bulgarian racing cyclist, who last rode for Bulgarian amateur team KK Drag. He rode at the 2014 UCI Road World Championships.

== Major results ==
2010
3rd Road race, National Road Championships
2011
1st Time trial, National Road Championships
4th Overall An Post Rás

1st Stage 3

2012
1st Time trial, National Road Championships
3rd Overall Dookoła Mazowsza
2013
3rd Time trial, National Road Championships
6th Overall Tour de Serbie
9th Overall Sibiu Cycling Tour
2014
1st Road race, National Road Championships
1st Stage 3a (TTT) Sibiu Cycling Tour
1st Stage 1 (TTT) Dookoła Mazowsza
7th Overall Tour de Serbie
2015
National Road Championships

1st Time trial
1st Road race

7th Overall Sibiu Cycling Tour
2016
1st Overall Sibiu Cycling Tour

1st Stage 2

2nd Time trial, National Road Championships
3rd Overall Bałtyk–Karkonosze Tour
4th Overall Tour de Serbie
2017
1st Road race, National Road Championships
7th Overall Tour of Bulgaria – North
7th Overall Tour of Bulgaria – South
2018
1st Road race, National Road Championships
3rd Overall Sharjah International Cycling Tour
8th Prueba Villafranca de Ordizia
2019
4th Overall In the Steps of Romans
