= Aleksandar Aleksiev =

Bulgarian cyclist

Personal information
- Full name: Aleksandar Alekseev Aleksiev
- Born: 5 November 1992 (age 33) Maglizh, Bulgaria

Cycling career
- Sport: Cycling
- Current team: Paris Cycliste Olympique
- Discipline: Road
- Role: Rider

Amateur teams
- 2011–2012: Nessebar
- 2013–2015: Brisaspor
- 2016–2017: Nessebar
- 2018–: Paris Cycliste Olympique

Aleksandar Aleksiev (born 5 November 1992) is a Bulgarian cyclist.

== Major results ==
2010
3rd Overall Tour of Mevlana Juniors
10th Fair Cities Trophy 2
2012
3rd Road race, National Road Championships
2013
1st Stage 1 Tour de Serbie
2014
1st Grand Prix Al Massira, Les Challenges de la Marche Verte
3rd Road race, National Road Championships
8th Trophée de la Maison Royale, Challenge du Prince
2016
1st Time trial, National Road Championships
1st Stage 5 Tour of Bulgaria
2017
2nd Time trial, National Road Championships
2nd Overall Tour of Bulgaria North
3rd Road race, National Road Championships
8th Overall Tour of Bihor
10th Overall Tour of Bulgaria South
