= Stefan Hristov (cyclist) =

Bulgarian cyclist

Personal information
- Full name: Stefan Koychev Hristov
- Born: 12 July 1985 (age 41) Stara Zagora, Bulgaria
- Height: 1.75 m (5 ft 9 in)
- Weight: 57 kg (126 lb)

Cycling career
- Sport: Cycling
- Discipline: Road
- Role: Rider

Amateur teams
- 2011: Nesebar
- 2012–2017: Brisaspor
- 2017–2018: KK Nessebar
- 2019: CC Vereia
- 2020–2021: Hemus 1896

Professional teams
- 2007–2008: Cinelli–OPD
- 2009: Cycling Club Bourgas
- 2018: Hainan Jilun Cycling Team

Stefan Koychev Hristov (Bulgarian: Стефан Койчев Христов; born 12 July 1985 in Stara Zagora) is a Bulgarian road racing cyclist, who most recently rode for Bulgarian amateur team Hemus 1896–Vereya. He competed in the road race at the 2016 Summer Olympics.

== Major results ==
2006
6th Overall Tour of Bulgaria
10th Overall Tour of Greece
10th Overall Giro delle Regioni
2008
2nd Road race, National Road Championships
4th Overall Tour of Bulgaria

1st Mountains classification

2010
1st Overall Tour of Trakya

1st Stages 1 & 4

4th Overall Tour of Marmara

1st Stage 4

4th Overall Tour of Victory
2012
1st Grand Prix Dobrich II
7th Grand Prix Dobrich I
2013
5th Overall Tour of Bulgaria

1st Stage 5

8th Overall Tour of Szeklerland
2014
1st Time trial, National Road Championships
1st Overall Tour of Szeklerland

1st Stages 2 & 3a (ITT)

5th Overall Tour de Serbie
2015
1st Overall Tour of Bulgaria

1st Mountains classification
1st Stage 2

2nd Road race, National Road Championships
5th Overall International Tour of Torku Mevlana
7th Overall Tour of Mersin
7th Overall Tour of Black Sea
7th Overall Tour of Aegean
9th Overall Tour of Szeklerland
2016
Tour de Serbie

1st Mountains classification
1st Bora Ivkovic Memorial Trophy

3rd Overall Tour of Mersin
10th Overall Tour of Bihor
2018
National Road Championships

3rd Road race
3rd Time trial
