= 2016 Tour de Serbie =

2016 UCI Europe Tour

Race details
- Dates: 14–19 June
- Stages: 6
- Distance: 806.9 km (501.4 mi)
- Winning time: 19hr 19' 31"

Results
Jersey awarded to the overall winner	Winner	Matej Mugerli (SLO)	(Synergy Baku)
	Second	Alex Turrin (ITA)	(Unieuro–Wilier)
	Third	Matija Kvasina (CRO)	(Synergy Baku)
Jersey awarded to the points classification winner	Points	Filippo Fortin (ITA)	(GM Europa Ovini)
Jersey awarded to the mountains classification winner	Mountains	Stefan Hristov (BUL)	(Brisaspor)
Jersey awarded to the youth classification winner	Youth	Serkan Balkan (TUR)	(Brisaspor)
	Team	Synergy Baku	

The 2016 Tour de Serbie (Serbian: Трка кроз Србију) was the 56th edition of the Tour de Serbie cycling stage race. It was scheduled from 14 to 19 June.

The winner of overall classification was Matej Mugerli.

== Schedule ==
Stage characteristics and winners
Stage	Date	Course	Distance	Type	Winner
1	14 June	Belgrade to Loznica	144.0 km (89.5 mi)	Flat stage	Filippo Fortin (ITA)
2	15 June	Bajina Bašta to Pribojska Banja	106.4 km (66 mi)	Intermediate stage	Georgi Georgiev (BUL)
3	16 June	Priboj to Novi Pazar	123.6 km (77 mi)	Intermediate stage	Matej Mugerli (SLO)
4	17 June	Novi Pazar to Sokobanja	191.4 km (119 mi)	Flat stage	Kanstantsin Klimiankou (BLR)
5	18 June	Sokobanja to Vrnjačka Banja	117.5 km (73 mi)	Intermediate stage	Filippo Fortin (ITA)
6	19 June	Vrnjačka Banja to Mladenovac	124.0 km (77 mi)	Hilly stage	Patrick Gamper (AUT)
	Total		806.9 km (501 mi)		

== Classification leadership ==
Stage	Winner	General classification Rumena majica	Points classification Rdeča majica	Mountains classification Modra majica	Young rider classification Bela majica	Team classification
1	Filippo Fortin	Filippo Fortin	Filippo Fortin	Alex Turrin	Josip Rumac	
2	Georgi Georgiev	Alex Turrin	Filippo Fortin	Matija Kvasina	Mattia Viel	
3	Matej Mugerli	Matej Mugerli	Matej Mugerli	Matija Kvasina	Dennis Paulus	
4	Kanstantsin Klimiankou	Matej Mugerli	Matej Mugerli	Matija Kvasina	Dennis Paulus	
5	Filippo Fortin	Matej Mugerli	Filippo Fortin	Matija Kvasina	Mattia Frapporti	
6	Patrick Gamper	Matej Mugerli	Filippo Fortin	Stefan Hristov	Serkan Balkan	
Final		Matej Mugerli	Filippo Fortin	Stefan Hristov	Serkan Balkan	Synergy Baku

== Final standings ==
Legend
General classification	Denotes the leader of the General classification	Points classification	Denotes the leader of the Points classification
Mountains classification	Denotes the leader of the Mountains classification	Young rider classification	Denotes the leader of the Young rider classification

=== General classification ===
	Rider	Team	Time
1	Matej Mugerli (SLO)	Synergy Baku	19h 19' 31"
2	Alex Turrin (ITA)	Unieuro–Wilier	+ 2' 12"
3	Matija Kvasina (CRO)	Synergy Baku	+ 2' 22"
4	Nikolay Mihaylov (BUL)	Bulgaria (national)	+ 2' 24"
5	Clemens Fankhauser (AUT)	Tirol Cycling Team	+ 2' 35"
6	Serkan Balkan (TUR)	Brisaspor	+ 2' 46"
7	Mattia Frapporti (ITA)	Unieuro–Wilier	+ 2' 46"
8	Dennis Paulus (AUT)	Tirol Cycling Team	+ 2' 47"
9	Antonio Di Sante (ITA)	GM Europa Ovini	+ 2' 47"
10	Rubén Ramos (ARG)	Tuşnad Cycling Team	+ 2' 47"

=== Points classification ===
	Rider	Team	Points
1	Filippo Fortin (ITA)	GM Europa Ovini	22
2	Matej Mugerli (SLO)	Synergy Baku	20
3	Alex Turrin (ITA)	Unieuro–Wilier	19
4	Siarhei Papok (BLR)	Minsk Cycling Club	18
5	Matteo Malucelli (ITA)	Unieuro–Wilier	18
6	Clemens Fankhauser (AUT)	Tirol Cycling Team	17
7	Patrick Gamper (AUT)	Tirol Cycling Team	16
8	Stefan Hristov (BUL)	Brisaspor	15
9	Marko Danilović (SRB)	Borac Čačak	13
10	Dušan Rajović (SRB)	Metalac Quick Kraljevo	11

=== Mountains classification ===
	Rider	Team	Points
1	Stefan Hristov (BUL)	Brisaspor	20
2	Matija Kvasina (CRO)	Synergy Baku	16
3	Clemens Fankhauser (AUT)	Tirol Cycling Team	11
4	Alex Turrin (ITA)	Unieuro–Wilier	10
5	Matej Mugerli (SLO)	Synergy Baku	6
6	Nikolay Genov (BUL)	Bulgaria (national)	3
7	Nikolay Mihaylov (BUL)	Bulgaria (national)	2
8	Mattia Viel (ITA)	Unieuro–Wilier	2
9	Onur Balkan (TUR)	Brisaspor	2
10	Feritcan Şamlı (TUR)	Torku Şekerspor	2

=== Young riders classification ===
	Rider	Team	Time
1	Serkan Balkan (TUR)	Brisaspor	19h 22' 17"
2	Mattia Frapporti (ITA)	Unieuro–Wilier	+ 0"
3	Dennis Paulus (AUT)	Tirol Cycling Team	+ 1"
4	Markus Freiberger (AUT)	Tirol Cycling Team	+ 1"
5	Stefan Stefanović (SRB)	Borac Čačak	+ 1"
6	Antonio Barać (BIH)	Bosnia and Herzegovina (nat.)	+ 1' 50"
7	Mattia Viel (ITA)	Unieuro–Wilier	+ 2' 22"
8	Dušan Rajović (SRB)	Metalac Quick Kraljevo	+ 3' 06"
9	Velizar Furlanski (BUL)	Bulgaria (national)	+ 3' 06"
10	Miloš Borisavljević (SRB)	Metalac Quick Kraljevo	+ 3' 28"

=== Team classification ===
	Team	Time
1	Synergy Baku	58h 06' 24"
2	Unieuro–Wilier	+ 10"
3	Tirol Cycling Team	+ 27"
4	Brisaspor	+ 3' 08"
5	GM Europa Ovini	+ 3' 48"
6	Tuşnad Cycling Team	+ 5' 12"
7	Bulgaria (national)	+ 5' 36"
8	Borac Čačak	+ 5' 55"
9	Minsk Cycling Club	+ 7' 13"
10	Metalac Quick Kraljevo	+ 10' 55"
