= Dimitar Gospodinov =

Bulgarian cyclist

Personal information
- Full name: Dimitar Dimitrov Gospodinov
- Born: 20 February 1972 (age 54)

Cycling career
- Sport: Cycling
- Current team: Retired
- Discipline: Road
- Role: Rider

Amateur teams
- 2001–2002: Martigues SC
- 2003: UC Cholet 49
- 2004: CC Étupes
- 2007–2009: Albert Bigot 79

Dimitar Dimitrov Gospodinov (born 20 February 1974) is a Bulgarian former racing cyclist.

Gospodinov represented Bulgaria in the road race at the 2004 Summer Olympics. He also won the Tour of Turkey in 1996, the Tour of Bulgaria in 2001 and 2002. He was also the national champion of Bulgaria in both the time trial and road race in 2000.

== Major results ==
1996
1st Overall Tour of Turkey
2000
National Road Championships

1st Time trial
1st Road race

2001
1st Overall Tour of Bulgaria
2002
1st Overall Tour of Bulgaria
2003
2nd Les Boucles du Sud Ardèche
2004
4th Overall Circuit de Lorraine
2006
1st Stage 5b Tour of Bulgaria (TTT)
2nd Overall Tour of Romania
