= Mert Mutlu =

Turkish professional cyclist (born 1974)

Personal information
- Born: 9 February 1974 (age 52)

Cycling career
- Sport: Cycling
- Current team: Retired
- Discipline: Road cycling
- Role: Rider, coach

Professional team
- Brisaspor

Major wins
- Stage Races Tour of Turkey (2001, 2003)

Mert Mutlu (born 9 February 1974) is a Turkish former professional cyclist.

== Palmarès ==
1999
1st Overall, (Turkey) Tour of Mevlana
2000
1st Overall, (Turkey) Tour of Mevlana
2001
1st Overall, Tour of Turkey
2003
1st Overall, Tour of Turkey

3rd Stage 3
1st Stage 5

2004
2nd Overall, (Romania) Turul României
3rd Overall, (Iran) Tour of Azerbaijan
2005
1st Stage 1, Tour of Turkey
3rd Stage 4, (Bulgaria) Grand Prix Sunny Beach
3rd Stage 5, (Romania) Turul României

3rd Stage 6

2007
2nd Road Elite, (Albania) Balkan Championshipsi
2nd Stage 3, (Turkey) Eastern Black Sea Cup-Time Trial
3rd Stage 2, (Turkey) Tour of Mevlana
2008
3rd Overall, (Turkey) Aksaray-Time Trial
3rd Stage 3, (Turkey) Bursa
2009
3rd Stage 1, (Turkey) Bursa
3rd Stage 1, Prologue (Turkey) Alanya-Time Trial
6th Overall, (Morocco) Tour du Maroc
4th Road Elite, (Turkey) Turkish National Road Race Championships
2010
4th Overall, (Turkey) Marmaris-Time Trial
3rd Stage 1, (Turkey) Fethiye Road Races-Time Trial

3rd Overall

2nd Stage 6, (Iran) Tour of Azerbaijan

4th Overall

10th Overall, President Tour of Iran
2nd Stage 1, (Turkey) Tour of Trakya

2nd Overall

4th Elite, (Turkey) Turkish National Time Trial Championships
1st Stage 1, (Turkey) Tour of Victory

2nd Stage 2
1st Overall

1st Stage 1, (Turkey) Tour of Marmara

2nd Overall

2011
3rd Prologue Stage 1, (Turkey) Tour of Isparta

3rd Overall

5th Road Elite, (Turkey) Turkish National Time Trial Championships
1st Stage 1, (Turkey) Tour of Cappadocia

1st Overall

1st Stage 1, (Turkey) Çorum

2nd Overall

4th Turkey Individual Classification
5th Overall, (Turkey) Tour of Victory
3rd Stage 1, (Turkey) Tour of Gallipoli

8th Overall

2012
9th, (Bulgaria) Grand Prix Dobrich II
