= Yovcho Yovchev =

Bulgarian cyclist

Personal information
- Full name: Yovcho Zhivkov Yovchev
- Born: 27 March 1991 (age 35)

Cycling career
- Sport: Cycling
- Discipline: Road
- Role: Rider

Professional teams
- 2012: Amore & Vita
- 2017: Amore & Vita–Selle SMP

Yovcho Zhivkov Yovchev (Bulgarian: Йовчо Живков Йовчев; born 27 March 1991) is a Bulgarian cyclist who last rode for Amore & Vita–Selle SMP. He was suspended for doping from 14 September 2012 until 31 December 2015.

== Major results ==
2010
1st Stage 1 Tour of Romania
3rd National Time Trial Championships
2011
1st Prologue Tour of Romania
