= 2016 Tour of Szeklerland =

2016 Tour of Szekerland
2016 UCI Europe Tour

Race details
- Dates: 5–7 August
- Stages: 4
- Winning time: hr ' "

The 2016 Tour of Szeklerland was a six-day cycling stage race that took place in Székely Land in early August 2016. The race is the 9th edition of the Tour of Szeklerland. It was rated as a 2.2 event as part of the 2016 UCI Europe Tour. The race included 4 stages, starting in Miercurea Ciuc on 5 August and returning there for the finish on 8 August in Miercurea Ciuc.
