= Nencho Staykov =

Bulgarian cyclist (born 1955)

Personal information
- Born: 19 December 1955 (age 70) Varna

Cycling career
- Sport: Cycling
- Discipline: road

Major wins
- General classification in the Tour of Turkey (1984); General classification in the Tour of Bulgaria (1978, 1980, 1984)

Nencho Staykov (Bulgarian: Ненчо Стайков), born 19 December 1955) is a Bulgarian former cyclist. He competed in the individual road race and team time trial events at the 1980 Summer Olympics.

He is a 1984 Tour of Turkey general classification winner and three-time Tour of Bulgaria general classification winner (1978, 1980 and 1984). He won two stages at the Peace Race and finished second overall in 1984.
