= Siegbert Schmeisser =

East German cyclist

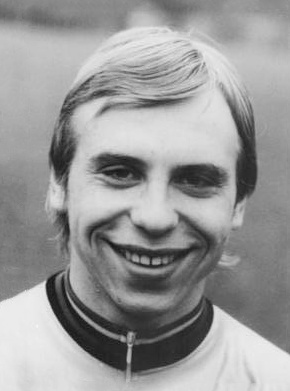
- Schmeisser in 1977

Personal information
- Born: 24 March 1957 (age 69) Gera, East Germany
- Height: 1.76 m (5 ft 9 in)
- Weight: 79 kg (174 lb)

Sport
- Sport: Cycling
- Club: SC Dynamo Berlin

Siegbert Schmeisser (born 24 March 1957) is a former East German cyclist. He competed at the 1976 Summer Olympics in the individual road race, but failed to reach the finish line. He won the DDR Rundfahrt in 1976 and the Tour of Bulgaria in 1977.
