= Bulgarian National Time Trial Championships =

National road cycling championship in Bulgaria

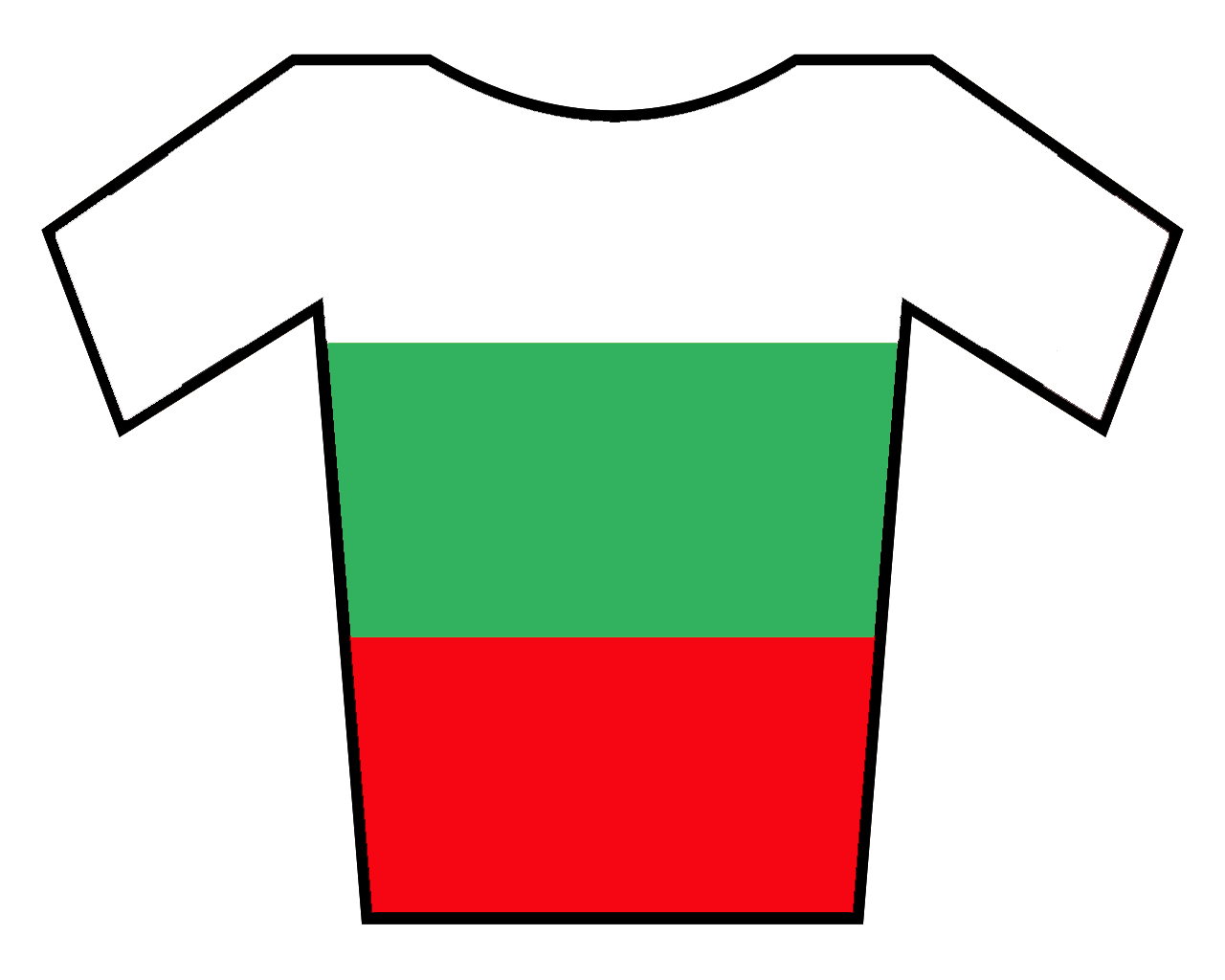
- The champion's jersey

Race details
- Date: June
- Discipline: Road
- Type: One-day race

History
- First edition: 2000
- Editions: 21 (as of 2022)
- First winner: Dimitar Gospodinov
- Most wins: Ivailo Gabrovski (7 wins)
- Most recent: Emil Stoynev

The Bulgarian National Time Trial Championships are held annually to decide the cycling champions in the time trial discipline, across various categories. The championship was first held in 2000.

== Men ==
Year	Gold	Silver	Bronze
2000	Dimitar Gospodinov	Ivan Markov	Svetoslav Tchanliev
2001	Ivailo Gabrovski	Gueorgui Koev	Gueorgi Gueorguiev
2002	Not held		
2003	Ivailo Gabrovski	Krasimir Dimitrov	Svetoslav Tchanliev
2004	Ivailo Gabrovski	Atanas Kostov	Evgeniy Gerganov
2005	Ivailo Gabrovski	Atanas Kostov	Pavel Shumanov
2006	Ivailo Gabrovski	Pavel Shumanov	Vladimir Koev
2007	Ivailo Gabrovski	Evgeniy Gerganov	Pavel Shumanov
2008	Ivailo Gabrovski	Bogdan Stoytchev	Evgeniy Gerganov
2009	Pavel Shumanov	Hristomir Angelov	Ivailo Gabrovski
2010	~~Vladimir Koev~~ (Note: Koev's results from 2010 and 2011 were disqualified due to doping.)	Pavel Shumanov	Yovcho Yovchev
2011	Nikolay Mihaylov	~~Vladimir Koev~~	Stanislav Zaraliev
2012	Nikolay Mihaylov	Spas Gyurov	Evgeniy Gerganov
2013	Spas Gyurov	Evgeniy Gerganov	Nikolay Mihaylov
2014	Stefan Hristov	Borislav Ivanov	Stanimir Cholakov
2015	Nikolay Mihaylov	Radoslav Konstantinov	Borislav Ivanov
2016	Aleksandar Aleksiev	Nikolay Mihaylov	Radoslav Konstantinov
2017	Radoslav Konstantinov	Aleksandar Aleksiev	Bogdan Stoytchev
2018	Radoslav Konstantinov	Bogdan Stoychev	Stefan Hristov
2019	Not held		
2020	Spas Gyurov	Martin Popov	Teodor Rusev
2021	Petar Dimitrov	Spas Gyurov	Nikolay Genov
2022	Nikolay Genov	Tsvetan Ivanov	Martin Papanov
2023	Yordan Petrov	Borislav Palashev	Petar Dimitrov
2024	Emil Stoynev	Yordan Petrov	Martin Papanov

== See also ==
- Bulgarian National Road Race Championships
- National road cycling championships
