= Pavel Shumanov =

Bulgarian cyclist

Personal information
- Born: 14 November 1968 (age 57) Sliven, Bulgaria

Cycling career
- Sport: Cycling
- Current team: Retired
- Discipline: Road
- Role: Rider

Professional teams
- 1997–1998: KRKA–Telekom Slovenije
- 2006–2007: Cycling Club Bourgas
- 2008–2010: Hemus 1896

Pavel Shumanov (Bulgarian: Павел Шуманов; born 14 November 1968) is a Bulgarian former cyclist.

== Major results ==
1989
1st Stage 4 Peace Race
1990
1st Overall Tour of Bulgaria
1992
1st Overall Tour of Bulgaria
2nd Overall Tour of Romania
1996
1st Stage 4 Hessen-Rundfahrt
2nd Giro del Medio Brenta
1997
1st Overall Tour of Bulgaria
1998
3rd Overall Tour of Slovenia
2005
3rd National Time Trial Championships
2006
1st Stage 4 Tour of Greece
1st Overall Tour of Romania
2nd National Time Trial Championships
3rd National Road Race Championships
2007
1st Stage 6 Tour of Romania
2nd Overall Tour of Bulgaria

1st Stage 5

3rd National Time Trial Championships
2008
1st Grand Prix Bourgas
1st Stage 5 Tour of Romania
3rd Overall Paths of King Nikola
2009
1st National Time Trial Championships
3rd Overall Tour of Romania
2010
2nd National Time Trial Championships
