= 2018 Presidential Tour of Turkey =

Cycling race

2018 UCI World Tour, race 35 of 37

Race details
- Dates: 9–14 October 2018
- Stages: 6
- Distance: 948.6 km (589.4 mi)
- Winning time: 22h 26' 16"

Results
	Winner	Eduard Prades (ESP)	(Euskadi–Murias)
	Second	Alexey Lutsenko (KAZ)	(Astana)
	Third	Nathan Haas (AUS)	(Team Katusha–Alpecin)

The 2018 Presidential Tour of Turkey was a road cycling stage race that took place between 9 and 14 October 2018 in Turkey. It was the 54th edition of the Presidential Tour of Turkey and the thirty-fifth event of the 2018 UCI World Tour. It was won by Eduard Prades of Euskadi–Murias.

== Teams ==
Twenty teams started the race. Each team had a maximum of seven riders:

UCI WorldTeams

- Astana
- Bora–Hansgrohe
- Team Sunweb
- Bahrain–Merida
- Quick-Step Floors
- Trek–Segafredo
- BMC Racing Team
- Team Katusha–Alpecin
- UAE Team Emirates

UCI Professional Continental teams

- Burgos BH
- Delko–Marseille Provence KTM
- Team Manzana Postobón
- Wilier Triestina–Selle Italia
- Caja Rural–Seguros RGA
- Euskadi–Murias
- Sport Vlaanderen–Baloise
- CCC–Sprandi–Polkowice
- Gazprom–RusVelo
- WB Aqua Protect Veranclassic

National team

- Turkey

== Route ==
Stage characteristics and winners
Stage	Date	Course	Distance	Type	Stage winner
1	9 October	Konya to Konya	150 km (93 mi)	Flat stage	Maximiliano Richeze (ARG)
2	10 October	Alanya to Antalya	154.1 km (95.8 mi)	Flat stage	Sam Bennett (IRL)
3	11 October	Fethiye to Marmaris	137.2 km (85.3 mi)	Medium mountain stage	Sam Bennett (IRL)
4	12 October	Marmaris to Selçuk	206.9 km (128.6 mi)	Hilly stage	Alexey Lutsenko (KAZ)
5	13 October	Selçuk to Manisa	137.3 km (85.3 mi)	Flat stage	Álvaro Hodeg (COL)
6	14 October	Bursa to Istanbul	166.7 km (103.6 mi)	Flat stage	Sam Bennett (IRL)

== General classification ==
Final general classification

Rank	Rider	Team	Time
1	Eduard Prades (ESP)	Euskadi–Murias	22h 26' 16"
2	Alexey Lutsenko (KAZ)	Astana	s.t.
3	Nathan Haas (AUS)	Team Katusha–Alpecin	+ 4"
4	Diego Ulissi (ITA)	UAE Team Emirates	s.t.
5	Fabio Felline (ITA)	Trek–Segafredo	+ 9"
6	Ruben Guerreiro (POR)	Trek–Segafredo	+ 10"
7	Delio Fernández (ESP)	Delko–Marseille Provence KTM	s.t.
8	Matteo Fabbro (ITA)	Team Katusha–Alpecin	s.t.
9	Mauro Finetto (ITA)	Delko–Marseille Provence KTM	s.t.
10	Nicolas Roche (IRL)	BMC Racing Team	s.t.
