= Nikolay Genov =

Bulgarian track cyclist

Personal information
- Born: 26 March 1997 (age 29)

Cycling career
- Sport: Cycling
- Current team: Tzar Simeon Plovdiv
- Disciplines: Road; Track
- Role: Rider

Amateur teams
- 2016–2019: Team Tzar Simeon Plovdiv
- 2017: KK Nessebar
- 2020: Hemus 1896
- 2021–: Tzar Simeon Plovdiv

Nikolay Genov (born 26 March 1997) is a Bulgarian road and track cyclist. He competed at the 2016 UEC European Track Championships in the team sprint event and scratch event.

== Major results ==
2014
7th Overall Belgrade Trophy Milan Panić
10th Overall Memorial Dimitar Yankov
2016
National Under-23 Road Championships

2nd Time trial
3rd Road race

2018
4th Time trial, National Road Championships
2021
3rd Time trial, National Road Championships
3rd Overall Tour du Cameroun

1st Mountains classification

2022
National Road Championships

1st Time trial
4th Road race
