= Marin Nikolov =

Bulgarian cyclist

Personal information
- Born: 15 November 1901
- Died: September 1944 (aged 42)

Cycling career
- Sport: Cycling

Marin Nikolov (Bulgarian: Марин Николов, 15 November 1901 – September 1944) was a Bulgarian cyclist. He competed in the team pursuit event at the 1936 Summer Olympics. He also won the 1934 edition of the Tour of Romania and the 1935 edition of the Tour of Bulgaria.
