= Clemens Fankhauser =

Austrian bicycle racer

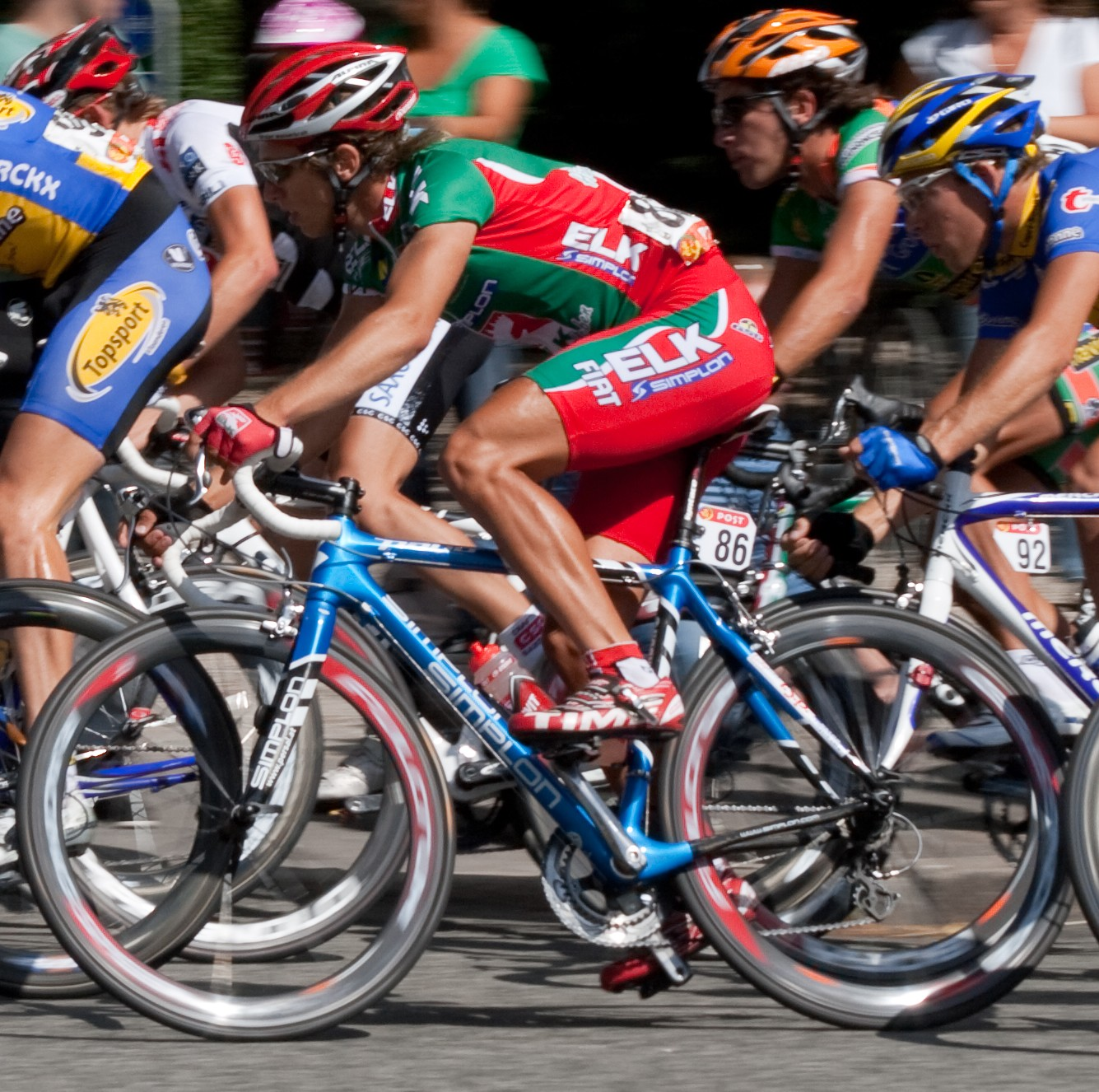
- Fankhauser at the 2008 Danmark Rundt

Personal information
- Full name: Clemens Fankhauser
- Born: 2 September 1985 (age 41) Rum, Tyrol, Austria

Cycling career
- Sport: Cycling
- Current team: Retired
- Discipline: Road
- Role: Rider

Professional teams
- 2007–2009: Elk Haus–Simplon
- 2010: Vorarlberg–Corratec
- 2011: Champion System
- 2012–2014: Tirol Cycling Team
- 2015: Hrinkow Advarics Cycleangteam
- 2016–2017: Tirol Cycling Team

Clemens Fankhauser (born 2 September 1985 in Rum, Tyrol) is an Austrian former professional cyclist. He took overall victories on the UCI Europe Tour at An Post Rás, Tour of Vojvodina and Tour of Szeklerland.

== Major results ==
2003
3rd Road race, National Junior Road Championships
2004
9th Trofeo Alcide Degasperi
2006
National Under-23 Road Championships

2nd Road race
3rd Time trial

2007
1st Grand Prix Austria Alu Guss
1st Stage 3 Grand Prix Guillaume Tell
3rd Road race, National Under-23 Road Championships
5th Overall Mainfranken-Tour
2010
5th Raiffeisen Grand Prix
6th Zagreb–Ljubljana
2012
1st Tour of Vojvodina II
7th Tour of Vojvodina I
2014
1st Overall An Post Rás
2nd Overall Tour de Serbie
2nd Overall Baltic Chain Tour
6th Grand Prix Sarajevo
6th Grand Prix Královéhradeckého kraje
7th Gran Premio Industrie del Marmo
9th Overall Flèche du Sud
2015
1st Overall Tour of Szeklerland

1st Mountains classification
1st Stage 2

5th Rund um Sebnitz
6th Overall Oberösterreich Rundfahrt
9th Overall Tour d'Azerbaïdjan
10th Raiffeisen Grand Prix
2016
1st Overall An Post Rás
2nd Time trial, National Road Championships
5th Overall Tour de Serbie
5th GP Adria Mobil
9th GP Laguna
9th Gran Premio Industrie del Marmo
