= Alex Turrin =

Italian cyclist

Personal information
- Born: 3 June 1992 (age 34) Feltre, Italy

Cycling career
- Sport: Cycling
- Current team: Retired
- Discipline: Road
- Role: Rider

Amateur teams
- 2007–2008: U.C. Foen Wienerberger
- 2009: Team CS Spercenigo
- 2010: Bianchin Marchiol
- 2011–2012: Team Brilla Pasta Montegrappa
- 2013: Zalf–Euromobil–Désirée–Fior
- 2014–2015: AS Mastromarco Dover

Professional teams
- 2016: Unieuro–Wilier
- 2017–2018: Wilier Triestina–Selle Italia

Alex Turrin (born 3 June 1992 in Feltre) is an Italian former professional cyclist, who rode professionally between 2016 and 2018 for the Unieuro–Wilier and Wilier Triestina–Selle Italia teams. In May 2018, he was named in the startlist for the Giro d'Italia.

== Major results ==
2010
7th Overall Giro della Lunigiana
2012
5th Giro del Belvedere
2013
3rd Giro del Medio Brenta
2015
2nd Gran Premio Città di Vigonza
5th Gran Premio Industrie del Marmo
2016
2nd Overall Tour de Serbie
3rd Overall Sibiu Cycling Tour
6th Overall Tour du Maroc

1st Stage 7

6th Gran Premio Industrie del Marmo
2018
9th Overall Tour de Taiwan
9th Giro dell'Appennino
10th GP Izola

=== Grand Tour general classification results timeline ===
Grand Tour	2018
Giro d'Italia	86
Tour de France	—
Vuelta a España	—

Legend
—	Did not compete
DNF	Did not finish
