= Tour of Cappadocia =

Race details
- Date: June–July
- Region: Nevşehir Province
- Local name(s): Uluslararası Kapadokya Bisiklet Turu
- Discipline: Road
- Competition: UCI Europe Tour
- Type: Stage race
- Organiser: Turkish Cycling Federation

History
- First edition: 2011
- Editions: 2 (as of 2018)
- First winner: Mert Mutlu (TUR)
- Most recent: Alexandr Ovsyannikov (KAZ)

Tour of Trakya

The Tour of Cappadocia (Turkish: Uluslararası Kapadokya Bisiklet Turu) is an international road cycling race organized by the Turkish Cycling Federation at Cappadocia in central Turkey. It is part of the UCI Europe Tour with a rating of 2.2.

The tour was held for the first time between June 30-July 3, 2011. It consists of four stages in a total length of 393 km (244 mi) and runs through towns in the historical region of Cappadocia around Nevşehir. The first edition's route was as follows:

1. 8 km (5.0 mi) (Prolog - Uçhisar - Kalaba - Hacıbektaş - Gülşehir - Nevşehir - Uçhisar)
2. 126 km (78 mi) (Nevşehir- Niğde - Nevşehir)
3. 141 km (88 mi) (Uçhisar - Kalaba - Hacıbektaş - Gülşehir - Nevşehir - Uçhisar)
4. 118 km (73 mi) (Nevşehir - Ihlara - Nevşehir)

== Winners ==
Year	Country	Rider	Team
2011	Turkey	Mert Mutlu	Brisaspor
2018	Kazakhstan	Alexandr Ovsyannikov	Vino–Astana Motors
