= Bulgarian National Road Race Championships =

National road cycling championship in Bulgaria

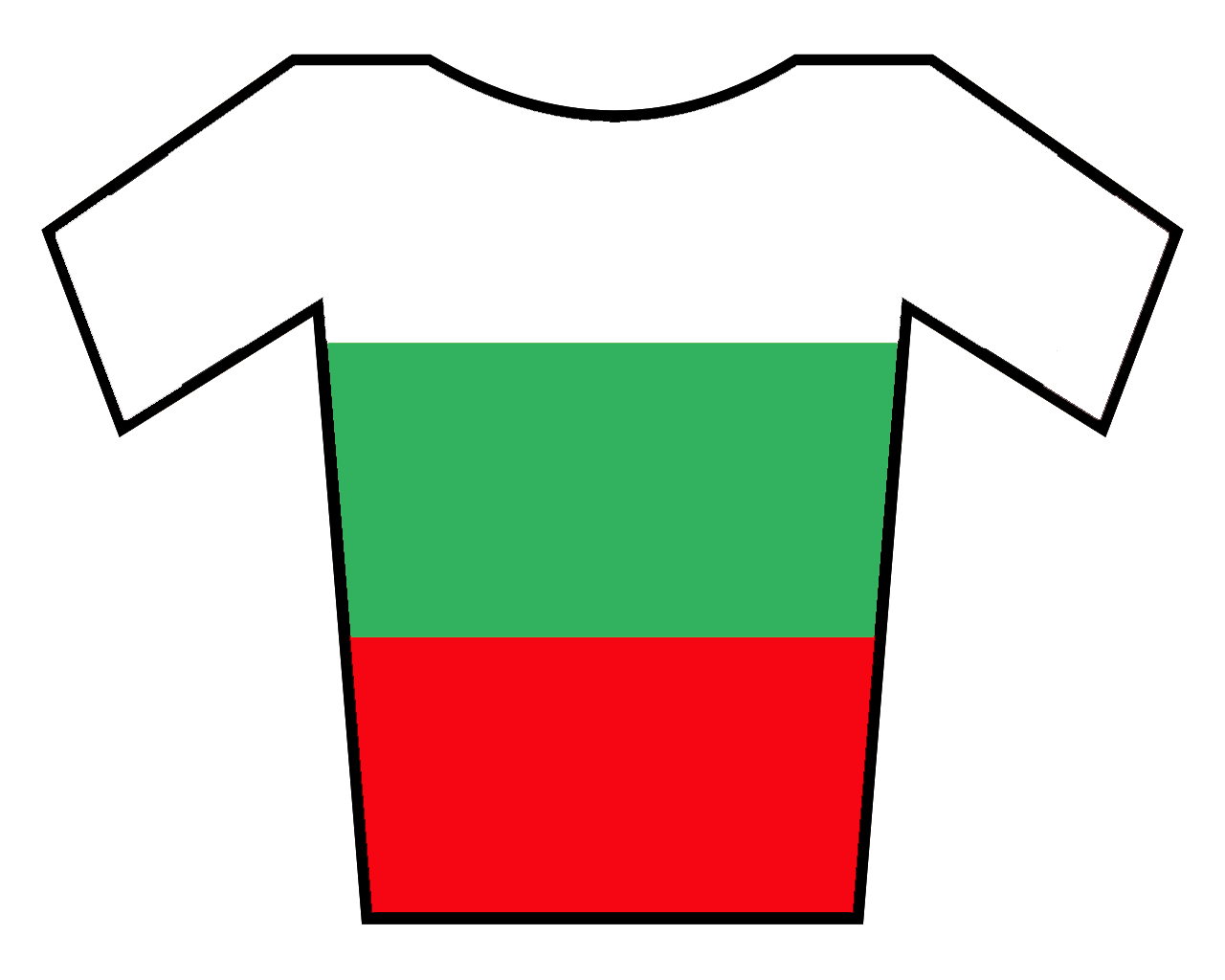
- The champion's jersey

Race details
- Date: June
- Discipline: Road
- Type: One-day race

History
- First edition: 2000
- Editions: 22 (as of 2022)
- First winner: Dimitar Gospodinov
- Most wins: Ivailo Gabrovski (5 wins)
- Most recent: Georgi Lumparov

The Bulgarian National Road Race Championships are held annually to decide the cycling champions in the road race discipline, across various categories. The championship was first held in 2000.

== Men ==
Christian Trenchev current champion

Year	Gold	Silver	Bronze
2000	Dimitar Gospodinov	Gueorgui Koev	Petar Vankov
2001	Gueorgui Koev	Vladimir Koev	Danail Petrov
2002	Ivailo Gabrovski		
2003	Daniel Petrov	Ivailo Gabrovski	Svetoslav Tchanliev
2004	Plamen Stoyanov	Svetoslav Tchanliev	Danail Petrov
2005	Ivailo Gabrovski	Daniel Petrov	Svetoslav Tchanliev
2006	Ivailo Gabrovski	Danail Petrov	Pavel Shumanov
2007	Ivailo Gabrovski	Radoslav Konstantinov	Evgeniy Gerganov
2008	Georgi Petrov Georgiev	Stefan Hristov	Svetoslav Tchanliev
2009	Ivailo Gabrovski	Vladimir Koev	Spas Gyurov
2010	Danail Petrov	~~Vladimir Koev~~ (Note: Vladimir Koev was stripped of his results due to a doping offence.)	Nikolay Mihaylov
2011	Danail Petrov	~~Vladimir Koev~~	Nikolay Mihaylov
2012	Danail Petrov	Georgi Petrov Georgiev	Aleksandar Aleksiev
2013	Danail Petrov	Georgi Petrov Georgiev	Spas Gyurov
2014	Nikolay Mihaylov	Georgi Petrov Georgiev	Aleksandar Aleksiev
2015	Nikolay Mihaylov	Stefan Hristov	Radoslav Konstantinov
2016	Georgi Petrov Georgiev	Radoslav Konstantinov	Velizar Furlanski
2017	Nikolay Mihaylov	Radoslav Konstantinov	Aleksandar Aleksiev
2018	Nikolay Mihaylov	Radoslav Konstantinov	Stefan Hristov
2019	Not held		
2020	Teodor Rusev	Tsvetan Ivanov	Martin Papanov
2021	Spas Gyurov	Martin Papanov	Preslav Balabanov
2022	Martin Papanov	Vladimir Koev	Tsvetan Ivanov
2023	Yordan Andreev	Yordan Petrov	Denis Dyankov
2024	Georgi Lumparov	Borislav Ivanov	Emil Stoynev

== See also ==
- Bulgarian National Time Trial Championships
- National road cycling championships
