= Mircea Romașcanu =

Romanian cyclist

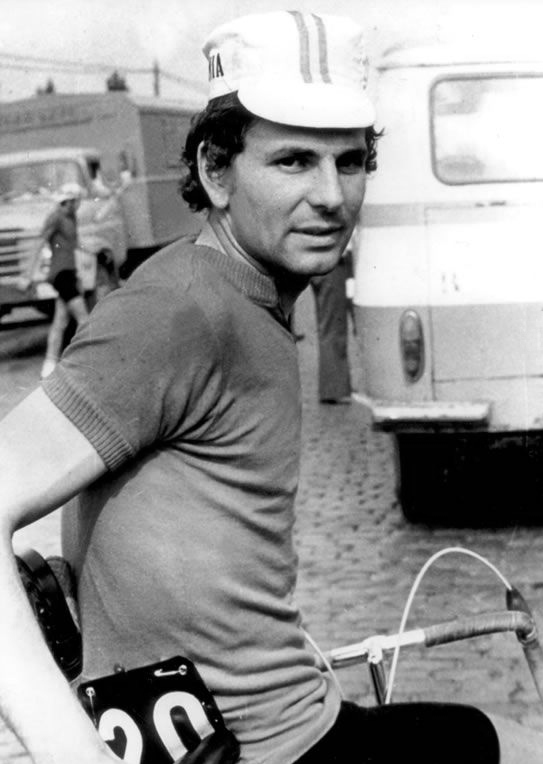

Personal information
- Born: 11 March 1953 (age 73) Bucharest, Romania
- Height: 179 cm (5 ft 10 in)
- Weight: 72 kg (159 lb)

Cycling career
- Sport: Cycling

Mircea Romașcanu (born 11 March 1953) is a Romanian former cyclist. He competed in the individual road race at the 1980 Summer Olympics. Romașcanu won the Tour of Romania in 1974, 1983 and 1985, placing second in 1988. He also won individual stages of the Peace Race in 1976 and 1981–1983 and many stages in Italy, Swiss, Greece, Turkey tour races. Since 1988 he is a cycling trainer for teams like Dinamo Bucharest and CS Otopeni.)
