= Presidential Cycling Tour of Turkey =

Turkish multi-day road cycling race

- 2026 Presidential Cycling Tour of Turkiye

Race details
- Date: April–May (until 2016, 2019–2022); October (2017–2018, 2023); April–May(2024– )
- Region: Turkey
- English name: Tour of Turkey
- Local name: Cumhurbaşkanlığı Bisiklet Turu (in Turkish)
- Discipline: Road
- Competition: UCI Europe Tour (2005–2016); UCI World Tour (2017–2019); UCI Europe Tour (2021, 2023); UCI ProSeries (2021–2023), 2024–)
- Type: Stage race
- Organiser: Turkish Cycling Federation
- Race director: Abdurrahman Açıkalın
- Web site: www.tourofturkey.org.tr

History
- First edition: 1963
- Editions: 61 (as of 2026)
- Most wins: Since 1963: (2 wins); Rifat Çalışkan (TUR); Erdinç Doğan (TUR); Ali Hüryılmaz (TUR); Mert Mutlu (TUR); Ghader Mizbani (IRI)
- Most recent: Sebastian Berwick (AUS)

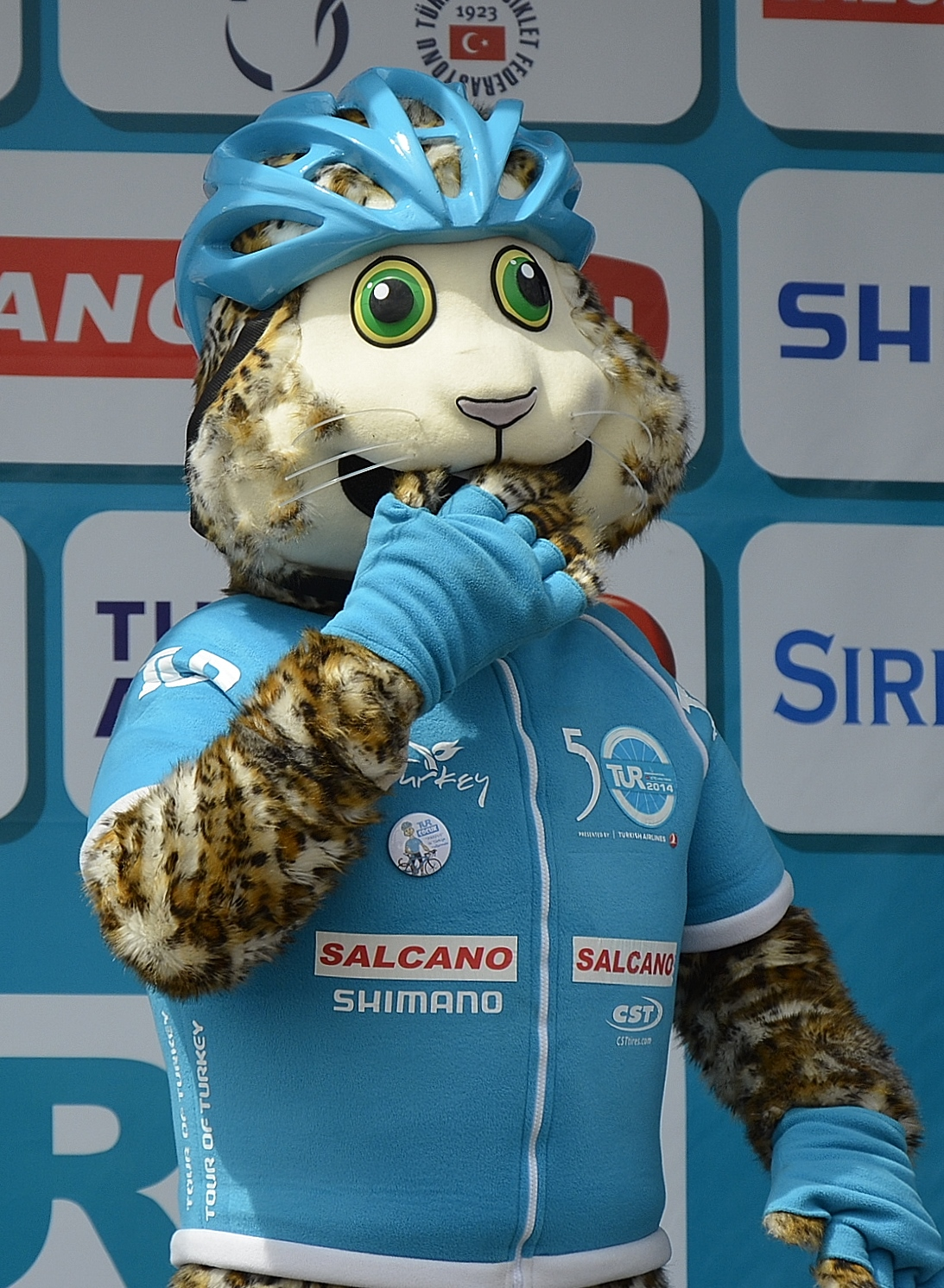
Mascot Pardus.

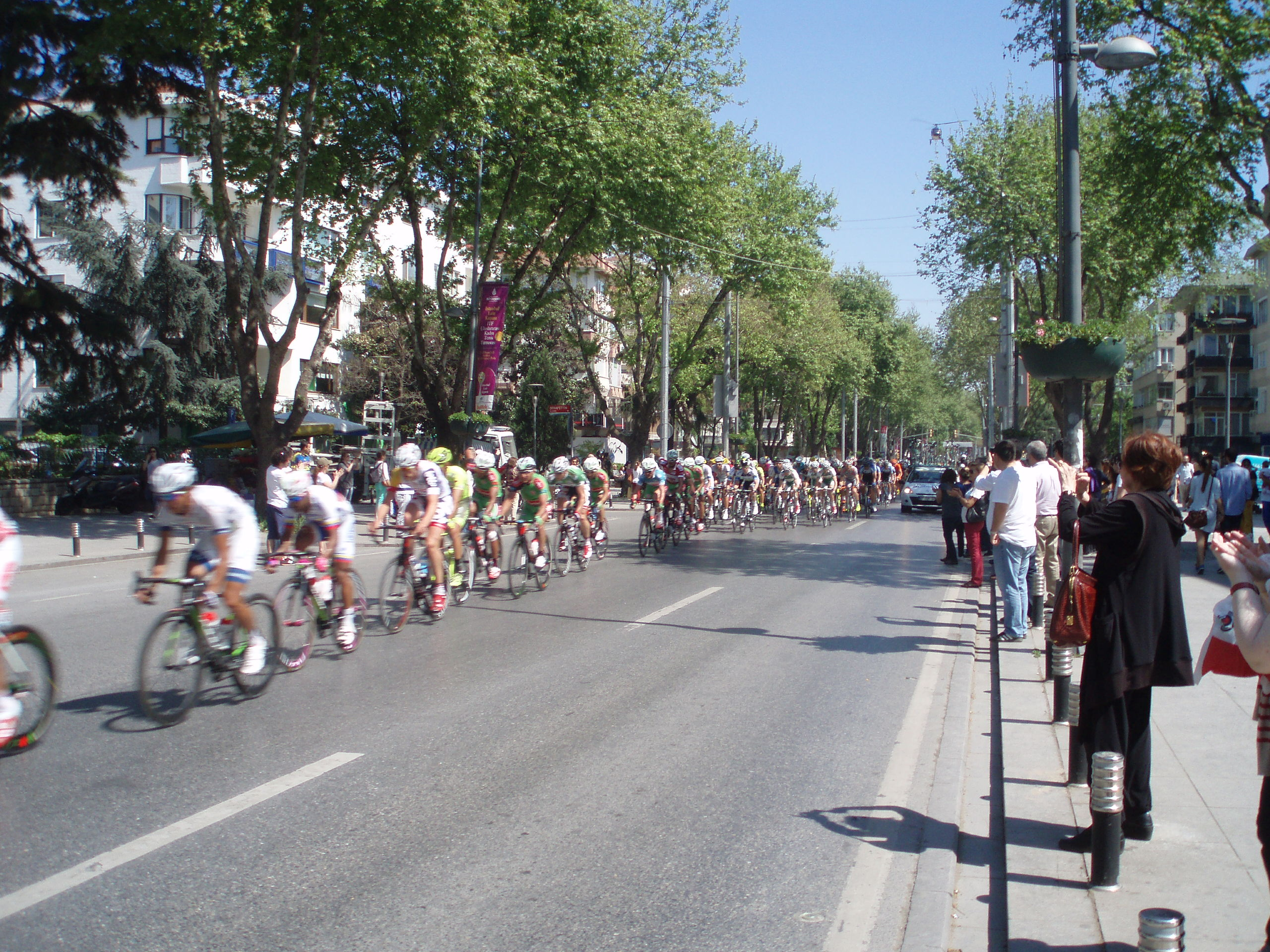
Riders in Stage 8 of the 49th Presidential Cycling Tour of Turkey at Bağdat Avenue, Istanbul on April 28, 2013.

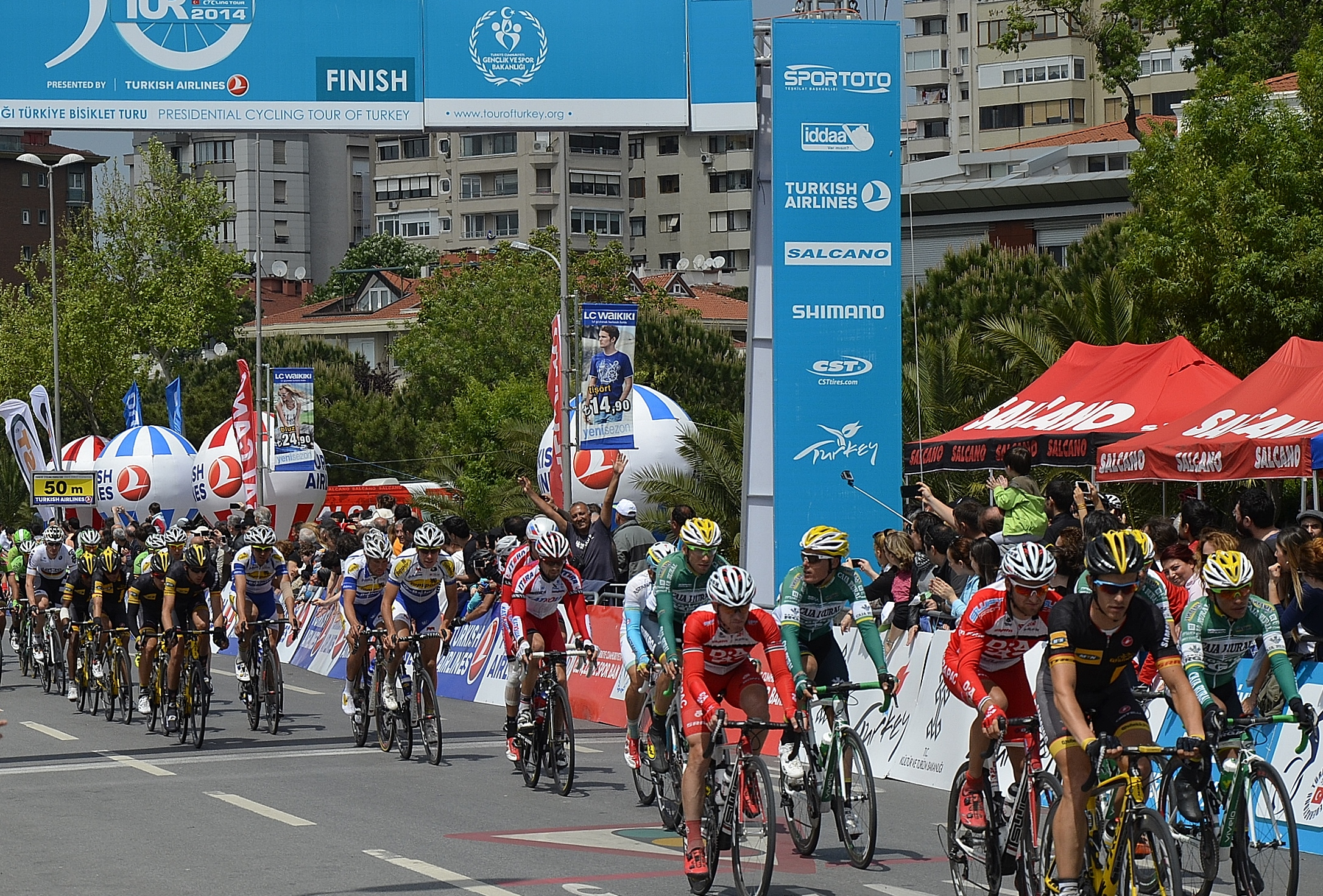
Riders in Stage 8 of the 50th Presidential Cycling Tour of Turkey at Çetin Emeç Boulevard, Istanbul on May 4, 2014.

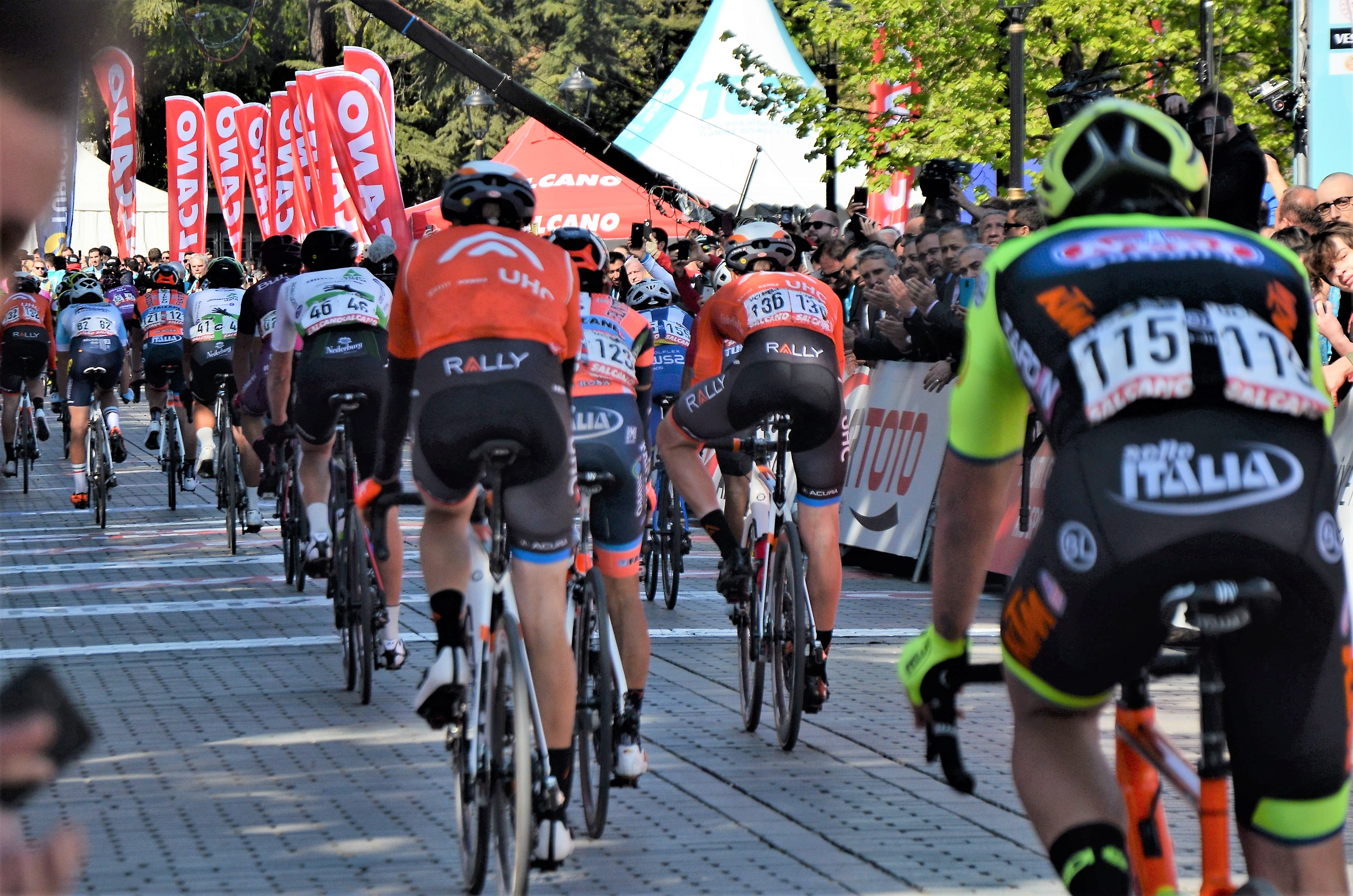
Riders at the finish of the 55th Presidential Cycling Tour of Turkey at Sultanahmet Square in Istanbul on April 21, 2019.

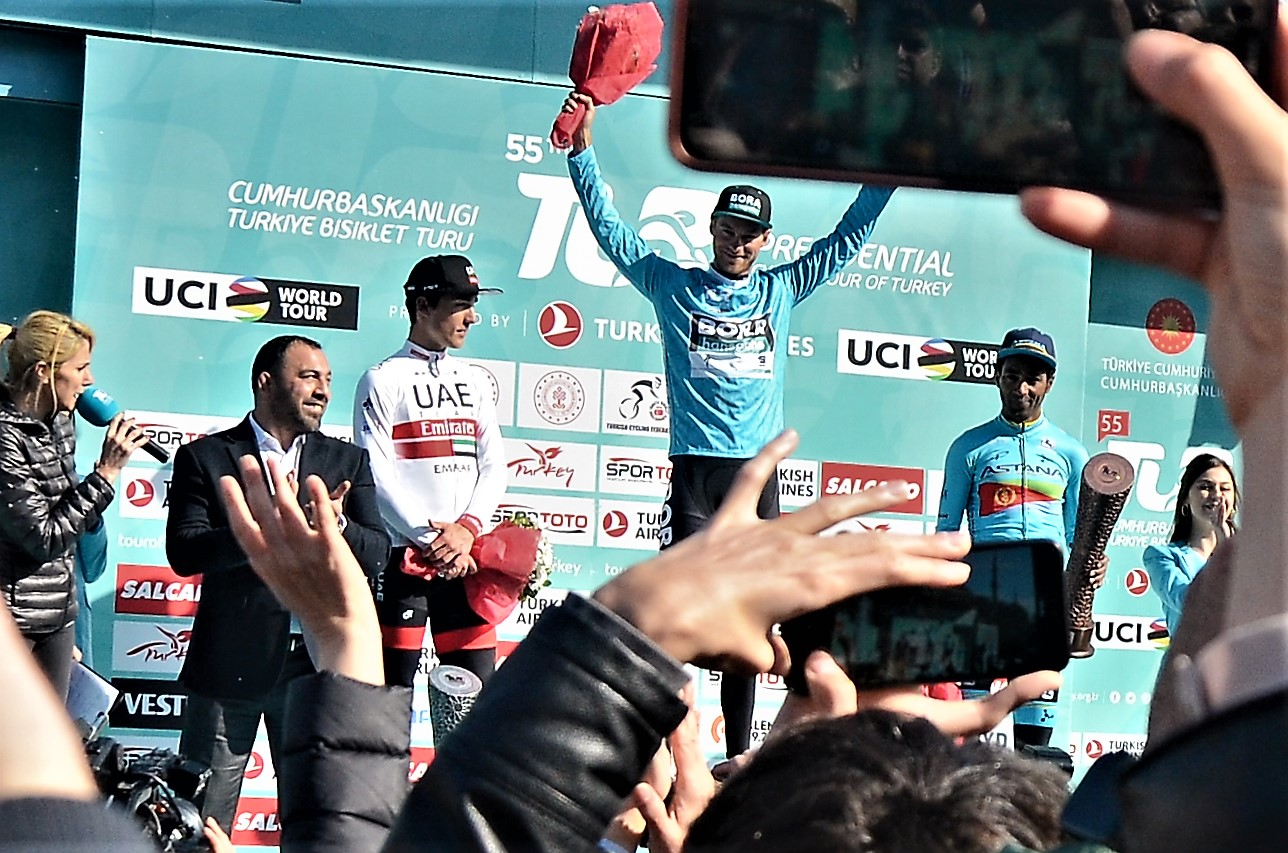
General classification podium award ceremony of the 55th Presidential Cycling Tour of Turkey. From left to right: runner-up Valerio Conti of UAE Team Emirates, winner Felix Großschartner of Bora–Hansgrohe, 3rd place Merhawi Kudus of Astana.

The Presidential Cycling Tour of Turkey (Turkish: Cumhurbaşkanlığı Bisiklet Turu) is a professional road bicycle racing stage race held annually in Turkey since 1963.

In 2005 the race became part of the UCI Europe Tour, rated as a 2.2 event, before being upgraded to 2.1 in 2008, and then to 2.HC for the 2010 edition. The race became part of the UCI World Tour in 2017, and was relegated to the newly formed UCI ProSeries in 2020. In 2023, it was again relegated to a 2.1 event on the UCI Europe Tour.

== Names ==
- 1963–2015 Tour of Turkey
- 2016–2025 Presidential Tour of Turkey
- 2026– Presidential Cycling Tour of Turkiye

== Winners ==
=== General classification ===
Year	Country	Rider	Team
1963	Turkey	Rıfat Çalışkan	
1964	Turkey	Hasan Kılıç	
1965	Turkey	Rıfat Çalışkan	
1966	Bulgaria	Ivan Bobekov	
1967	Bulgaria	Dimitar Kotev	
1968	Soviet Union	Alexandre Kulibin	USSR National Team
1969	Soviet Union	Gainan Saidkhuzhin	USSR National Team
1970	Bulgaria	Slavcho Nikolov	
1971	Romania	Constantin Ciocan	
1972	Poland	Andrzej Karbowiak	
1973	Turkey	Ali Hüryılmaz	Turkish National Team
1974	Turkey	Seyit Kirmizi	Turkish National Team
1975	Turkey	Ali Hüryılmaz	Turkish National Team
1976	Soviet Union	Vladimir Osokin	USSR National Team
1977	Soviet Union	Vladimir Shapovalov	USSR National Team
1978	Czechoslovakia	Vlastibor Konečný	
1979	Czechoslovakia	Jiří Škoda	
1980	Soviet Union	Youri Kachirin	USSR National Team
1981	Bulgaria	Grozyo Kalchev	
1982	Poland	Zbigniew Szczepkowski	
1983	Romania	Mircea Romascanu	
1984	Bulgaria	Nentcho Staykov	
1985	Poland	Mieczyslaw Poreba	
1986	Poland	Jerzy Swinoga	
1987	Soviet Union	Alexander Krasnov	USSR National Team
1988	Bulgaria	Igor Nechayev	
1989	Greece	Kanellos Kanellopoulos	
1990	Soviet Union	Vitali Tolkatchev	
1991	Czechoslovakia	Róbert Glajza	
1992	Germany	Stefan Steinweg	
1993	Bulgaria	Ivan Stanchev	
1994	Poland	Krystian Zajdel	
1995	Kazakhstan	Andrei Kivilev	Festina–Lotus
1996	Bulgaria	Dimitar Dimitrov	
1997	Egypt	Kholefy El Sayed	
1998	Turkey	Erdinç Doğan	Turkish National Team
1999	Turkey	Erdinç Doğan	Turkish National Team
2000	Kazakhstan	Sergey Lavrenenko	
2001	Turkey	Mert Mutlu	Brisaspor
2002	Iran	Ghader Mizbani	Telekom Malaysia Cycling Team
2003	Turkey	Mert Mutlu	Turkish National Team
2004	Iran	Ahad Kazemi	Giant Asia Racing Team
2005	Bulgaria	Svetoslav Tchanliev	Cycling Club Bourgas
2006	Iran	Ghader Mizbani	Brisaspor
2007	Bulgaria	Ivailo Gabrovski	Storez Ledecq Materiaux
2008	Spain	David García Dapena	Karpin–Galicia
2009	South Africa	Daryl Impey	Barloworld
2010	Italy	Giovanni Visconti	ISD–NERI
2011	Russia	Alexander Efimkin	Team Type 1–Sanofi Aventis
2012	Kazakhstan	Alexsandr Dyachenko	Astana
2013	Eritrea	Natnael Berhane	Team Europcar
2014	Great Britain	Adam Yates	Orica–GreenEDGE
2015	Croatia	Kristijan Đurasek	Lampre–Merida
2016	Portugal	José Gonçalves	Caja Rural–Seguros RGA
2017	Italy	Diego Ulissi	UAE Team Emirates
2018	Spain	Eduard Prades	Euskadi–Murias
2019	Austria	Felix Großschartner	Bora–Hansgrohe
2020	No race due to COVID-19 pandemic		
2021	Spain	José Manuel Díaz	Delko
2022	New Zealand	Patrick Bevin	Israel–Premier Tech
2023	Kazakhstan	Alexey Lutsenko	Astana Qazaqstan Team
2024	Netherlands	Frank van den Broek	Team dsm–firmenich PostNL
2025	Netherlands	Wout Poels	XDS Astana Team
2026	Australia	Sebastian Berwick	Caja Rural–Seguros RGA

==== Wins per country since 1963 ====
10	Bulgaria, Turkey
7	Soviet Union
5	Poland
4	Kazakhstan
3	Czechoslovakia, Iran, Spain
2	Italy, Netherlands, Romania
1	Austria, Australia, Croatia, Egypt, Eritrea, Germany, Great Britain, Greece, New Zealand, Portugal, Russia, South Africa

=== Points classification ===
Year	Country	Rider	Team
2010	Germany	André Greipel	Team HTC–Columbia
2011	Italy	Alessandro Petacchi	Lampre–ISD
2012	Australia	Matthew Goss	GreenEDGE
2013	Germany	André Greipel	Lotto–Belisol
2014	Great Britain	Mark Cavendish	Omega Pharma–Quick-Step
2015	Great Britain	Mark Cavendish	Etixx–Quick-Step
2016	Italy	Manuel Belletti	Southeast–Venezuela
2017	Belgium	Edward Theuns	Trek–Segafredo
2018	Ireland	Sam Bennett	Bora–Hansgrohe
2019	Ireland	Sam Bennett	Bora–Hansgrohe
2020	No race due to COVID-19 pandemic		
2021	Belgium	Jasper Philipsen	Alpecin–Fenix
2022	Belgium	Jasper Philipsen	Alpecin–Fenix
2023	Belgium	Jasper Philipsen	Alpecin–Deceuninck
2024	Denmark	Tobias Lund Andresen	Team dsm–firmenich PostNL
2025	Italy	Giovanni Lonardi	Team Picnic–PostNL
2026	Belgium	Tom Crabbe	Team Flanders–Baloise

==== Wins per country since 2010 ====
5	Belgium
3	Italy
2	Germany, Great Britain, Ireland
1	Australia, Denmark

=== Mountains classification ===
Year	Country	Rider	Team
2010	France	Rémi Pauriol	Cofidis
2011	Colombia	Luis Felipe Laverde	Colombia es Pasión–Café de Colombia
2012	Italy	Marco Bandiera	Omega Pharma–Quick-Step
2013	Ukraine	Sergiy Gretchyn	Torku Şekerspor
2014	Curaçao	Marc de Maar	UnitedHealthcare
2015	Colombia	Juan Pablo Valencia	Colombia
2016	Poland	Przemysław Niemiec	Lampre–Merida
2017	Italy	Mirco Maestri	Bardiani–CSF
2018	Slovenia	Grega Bole	Bahrain–Merida
2019	Belgium	Thimo Willems	Sport Vlaanderen–Baloise
2020	No race due to COVID-19 pandemic		
2021	Ukraine	Vitaliy Buts	Salcano–Sakarya BB Team
2022	United States	Noah Granigan	Wildlife Generation Pro Cycling
2023	Australia	Jay Vine	UAE Team Emirates
2024	Germany	Vinzent Dorn	Bike Aid
2026	Australia	Sebastian Berwick	Caja Rural–Seguros RGA

==== Wins per country since 2010 ====
2	Australia, Colombia, Italy, Ukraine
1	Belgium, Curaçao, France, Germany, Netherlands, Poland, Slovenia, United States

=== Turkish Beauties (Sprints) classification ===
Year	Country	Rider	Team
2010	France	Christophe Kern	Cofidis
2011	Spain	Arturo Mora	Caja Rural
2012	Russia	Maxim Belkov	Team Katusha
2013	Russia	Mikhail Ignatiev	Team Katusha
2014	Italy	Mattia Pozzo	Neri Sottoli
2015	Spain	Lluís Mas	Caja Rural–Seguros RGA
2016	Spain	Lluís Mas	Caja Rural–Seguros RGA
2017	Turkey	Onur Balkan	Turkey (national team)
2018	Turkey	Onur Balkan	Turkey (national team)
2019	Turkey	Feritcan Şamlı	Salcano–Sakarya BB Team
2020	No race due to COVID-19 pandemic		
2021	Netherlands	Ivar Slik	Abloc CT
2022	Turkey	Batuhan Özgür	Sakarya BB Pro Team
2023	Belgium	Mauro Verwilt	Tarteletto–Isorex
2024	Germany	Vinzent Dorn	Bike Aid
2025	South Africa	Willie Smit	China Anta–Mentech Cycling Team
2026	Turkey	Mustafa Tarakcı	Konya Büyükşehir Belediyespor

==== Wins per country since 2010 ====
5	Turkey
3	Spain
2	Russia
1	Belgium, France, Germany, Italy, Netherlands, South Africa

== Classifications ==
As of the 2022 edition, the jerseys worn by the leaders of the individual classifications are:
- Turquoise Jersey – Worn by the leader of the general classification.
- Green Jersey – Worn by the leader of the points classification.
- Red Jersey – Worn by the leader of the mountains classification.
- White Jersey – Worn by the leader of the Turkish Beauties sprints classification.
