= Grand Prix Dobrich =

Race details
- Date: May
- Region: Dobrich, Bulgaria
- Discipline: Road
- Competition: UCI Europe Tour
- Type: One-day race

History
- First edition: 2012
- Editions: 1
- Final edition: 2012
- First winner: Martin Grashev (BUL); Stefan Hristov (BUL)
- Most wins: No repeat winners
- Final winner: Martin Grashev (BUL); Stefan Hristov (BUL)

The Grand Prix Dobrich was a road cycling race held in Bulgaria. The race consisted of two one day races. It was part of UCI Europe Tour in category 1.2.

== Winners ==
=== Grand Prix Dobrich I ===
Year	Country	Rider	Team
2012	Bulgaria	Martin Grashev	Nessebar

=== Grand Prix Dobrich II ===
Year	Country	Rider	Team
2012	Bulgaria	Stefan Hristov	Brisaspor
