= Rıfat Çalışkan =

Turkish cyclist

Personal information
- Born: 10 July 1940 Konya
- Died: June 2009 (aged 68) Bursa

Cycling career
- Sport: Cycling

Rıfat Çalışkan (10 July 1940 – June 2009) was a Turkish cyclist. He competed in the individual road race at the 1972 Summer Olympics.
