= 2016 Sibiu Cycling Tour =

2016 Sibiu Tour
2016 UCI Europe Tour

Race details
- Dates: 6–10 July
- Stages: 5
- Distance: 553.8 km (344.1 mi)
- Winning time: 13h 35' 57

Results
Jersey awarded to the overall winner	Winner	Nikolay Mihaylov (BUL)	(CCC–Sprandi–Polkowice)
	Second	Francesco Gavazzi (ITA)	(Androni Giocattoli–Sidermec)
	Third	Alex Turrin (ITA)	(Unieuro–Wilier)
Jersey awarded to the points classification winner	Points	Davide Viganò (ITA)	(Androni Giocattoli–Sidermec)
Jersey awarded to the mountains classification winner	Mountains	Daniel Turek (CZE)	(Cycling Academy)
Jersey awarded to the young rider classification winner	Young rider	Marco Tecchio (ITA)	(Unieuro–Wilier)

The 2016 Sibiu Cycling Tour took place between July 6 and July 10, after a one-week delay due to local elections. It opened with the traditional prologue and for the first time featured a mountain time trial to Bâlea Lac. It featured four pro-continental teams, including, for the first time, a British team, ONE Pro Cycling.

It was won by Nikolay Mihaylov after he was part of a breakaway on Stage 2. It was notable for its first Romanian stage winner, Andrei Nechita, who won the opening prologue; and for its first Australian stage winner, Steele von Hoff.

== Teams ==
UCI Professional Continental teams

- Androni Giocattoli–Sidermec
- CCC–Sprandi–Polkowice
- Nippo–Vini Fantini
- ONE Pro Cycling

UCI Continental teams

- 0711 / Cycling
- Dukla Banská Bystrica
- Azerion / Villa Valkenburg
- Bike Aid
- Team Differdange–Geba
- Christina Jewelry–Kuma
- Tusnad Cycling Team
- U.C. Trevigiani Energiapura Marchiol
- Synergy Baku
- Team ColoQuick
- Cycling Academy
- GM Europa Ovini

National Teams

- Romanian National Team
- Bulgarian National Team

== Route and stages ==
Stage Information
Stage	Date	Course	Distance	Type	Winner	Yellow jersey
P	6 July	Sibiu – Sibiu	2.3 km (1 mi)	Time Trial	Andrei Nechita (ROM)	Andrei Nechita (ROM)
1	7 July	Sibiu – Agnita – Cisnădie – Sibiu	188.0 km (117 mi)	Intermediate stage	Steele von Hoff (AUS)	Steele von Hoff (AUS)
2	8 July	Sibiu – Mediaș – Paltinis	213.0 km (132 mi)	Mountain Stage	Nikolay Mihaylov (BUL)	Nikolay Mihaylov (BUL)
3	9 July	Balea Lac	7.5 km (5 mi)	Mountain Time Trial	Kirill Pozdnyakov (RUS)	Nikolay Mihaylov (BUL)
4	10 July	Sibiu – Poplaca Circuit – Sibiu	143.0 km (89 mi)	Intermediate Stage	Davide Viganò (ITA)	Nikolay Mihaylov (BUL)

Final Classifications
	Cyclist	Team	Time
1	Nikolay Mihaylov (BUL)	CCC–Sprandi–Polkowice	13h 35' 57
2	Francesco Gavazzi (ITA)	Androni Giocattoli–Sidermec	+ 4' 33"
3	Alex Turrin (ITA)	Unieuro–Wilier	+ 5' 35"
Points Classification	Davide Viganò (ITA)	Androni Giocattoli–Sidermec	-
King of the Mountains Jersey	Daniel Turek (CZE)	Cycling Academy Team	-
Best Romanian Rider	Serghei Țvetcov (ROM)	Androni Giocattoli–Sidermec	-
Best U23 Rider	Marco Tecchio (ITA)	Unieuro–Wilier	-
Sprints Classification	Daniel Crista (ROM)	Tuşnad Cycling Team	-
