= Cycling Club Bourgas =

Team information
- UCI code: CCB
- Registered: Bulgaria
- Founded: 2006
- Disbanded: 2009
- Discipline: Road
- Status: UCI Continental

Key personnel
- General manager: Neno Kalachev

Team name history
- 2006–2009: Cycling Club Bourgas

Cycling Club Bourgas was a Bulgarian UCI Continental road cycling that competed from 2006 to 2009.

== Major wins ==
2006
Stage 4 International Tour of Hellas, Pavel Shumanov
Stage 4 Tour d'Egypte, Svetoslav Tchanliev
2007
Overall Tour of Bulgaria, Evgeniy Gerganov
2008
Overall Tour of Chalkidiki, Daniel Petrov

Stage 1, Daniel Petrov

2009
Overall Boucles de la Mayenne, Janek Tombak
Overall Kreiz Breizh Elites, Janek Tombak
Tallinn–Tartu GP, Erki Pütsep
Grand Prix of Donetsk, Mart Ojavee
Belgrade–Banja Luka I, Normunds Lasis
Stage 3 Tour of Szeklerland, Vladimir Koev
Stage 3 Tour of Bulgaria, Martin Prázdnovský
