= Tour of Szeklerland =

Race details
- Date: July–August
- Region: Székely Land, Romania
- English name: Tour of Szeklerland
- Local name(s): Turul Ciclist al Ținutului Secuiesc (in Romanian); Székelyföld Kerékpáros Körverseny (in Hungarian)
- Discipline: Road
- Competition: UCI Europe Tour
- Type: Stage race
- Web site: tourofszeklerland.ro

History
- First edition: 2007
- Editions: 19 (as of 2025)
- First winner: Zoltán Remák (SVK)
- Most wins: Vitaliy Popkov (UKR) (2 wins)
- Most recent: Dominik Neuman (CZE)

The Tour of Szeklerland is a European cycling stage race held in Székely Land, Romania. Since 2008, the race has been organised as a 2.2 event on the UCI Europe Tour.

== History ==
Founders Eduard Novák and Róbert Ráduly organized the first edition in 2006 as a regional competition. By 2008, the Tour of Szeklerland became the first cycling race in Romania to hold a UCI 2.2 category. Later that same year, the Tour of Romania also entered this category.

In 2022, for the first time in its history, the competition began outside Romania, with the starting line set in Debrecen, Hungary.

As of 2024, no Romanian or Hungarian rider has won the race.

The 2026 edition was cancelled due to financial constraints.

== Winners ==
Year	Country	Rider	Team
2007	Slovakia	Zoltán Remák	P-Nivo-Betonexpressz 2000-KFT.se
2008	Czech Republic	Martin Hebík	AC Sparta Praha
2009	Ukraine	Vitaliy Popkov	ISD Sport Donetsk
2010	Bulgaria	Evgeniy Gerganov	Hemus 1986-Vivelo
2011	Germany	Florian Bissinger	Arbö–Gebrüder Weiss–Oberndorfer
2012	Ukraine	Vitaliy Popkov	ISD–Lampre Continental
2013	Bulgaria	Georgi Georgiev	Brisaspor
2014	Bulgaria	Stefan Hristov	Kocaeli Brisaspor
2015	Austria	Clemens Fankhauser	Hrinkow Advarics Cycleangteam
2016	Russia	Kirill Pozdnyakov	Synergy Baku
2017	Austria	Patrick Bosman	Hrinkow Advarics Cycleang
2018	Moldova	Nicolae Tanovițchii	Team Novak
2019	Germany	Jonas Rapp	Hrinkow Advarics Cycleang
2020	Poland	Jakub Kaczmarek	Mazowsze Serce Polski
2021	Poland	Alan Banaszek	HRE Mazowsze Serce Polski
2022	Poland	Szymon Rekita	Voster ATS Team
2023	Austria	Martin Messner	WSA KTM Graz p/b Leomo
2024	Russia	Lev Gonov	Astana Qazaqstan Development Team
2025	Czech Republic	Dominik Neuman	ATT Investments
2026	No race		
