= Jilun Cycling Team =

Chinese cycling team

Team information
- UCI code: JLC
- Registered: China
- Founded: 2011
- Discipline: Road
- Status: UCI Continental

Team name history
- 2011–2013 2013–2014 2015 2015–2016 2016 2017–2018 2019–: China Jilun Cycling Team; China Wuxi Jilun Cycling Team; China Jilun Cycling Team; Jilun Shakeland Cycling Team; Hainan Jilun Shakeland Cycling Team; Hainan Jilun Cycling Team; Jilun Cycling Team

The Jilun Cycling Team is a Chinese UCI Continental cycling team established in 2011.

In October 2015, the team signed Mustafa Sayar after completing his doping ban.

== Team roster ==
As of 5 April 2020.

Rider	Date of birth
Chen Baolong (CHN)	31 December 2001 (age 24)
Chen Zhuo (CHN)	2 November 1998 (age 27)
Guo Huangchen (CHN)	6 October 2000 (age 25)
Hu Haojun (CHN)	31 January 2001 (age 25)
Lau Wan Hei (HKG)	3 February 1995 (age 31)

Rider	Date of birth
Lu Jiacheng (CHN)	13 September 2001 (age 24)
Wang Haizhou (CHN)	15 June 1998 (age 28)
Wang Junjie (CHN)	7 September 1999 (age 26)
Wei Xin (CHN)	10 April 2001 (age 25)
Yang Tao (CHN)	1 January 1997 (age 29)

== Major wins ==
2012
Stage 7 Tour of Taihu Lake, Sébastien Jullien
