= Racing Cycles–Kastro Team =

Team information
- UCI code: TKT
- Registered: Greece
- Founded: 2007
- Disbanded: 2014
- Discipline: Road
- Status: UCI Continental

Team name history
- 2007 2008 2009 2010 2011 2012 2013–2014 2014: Technal Kastro; Cosmote Kastro; Heraklion–Nessebar; Heraklion Kastro–Murcia; KTM–Murcia; Gios–Deyser Leon Kastro; Kastro Team; Racing Cycles–Kastro

Racing Cycles–Kastro Team was a Greek UCI Continental cycling team.
