= Tour of Romania =

- 2026 Tour of Romania
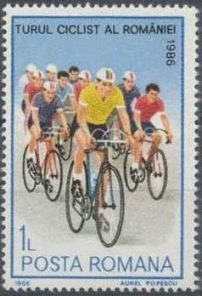

Race details
- Date: September
- Region: Romania
- English name: Tour of Romania
- Local name: Turul României
- Nickname: Mica Buclă ("Little Loop")
- Discipline: Road
- Competition: UCI Europe Tour
- Type: Stage race
- Organiser: Romanian Cycling Federation
- Web site: turulromaniei.ro

History
- First edition: 1934; 92 years ago
- Editions: 58 (as of 2026)
- First winner: Marin Nikolov (BUL)
- Most wins: Constantin Dumitrescu (ROU); Mircea Romașcanu (ROU) (3 wins)
- Most recent: Barnabás Vas (HUN)

The Tour of Romania (or "Little Loop") is a cycling competition held in Romania. It is organised as 2.2 category race on the UCI Europe Tour, and has previously been rated 2.1. The tour is organized by the Romanian Cycling Federation.

== History ==
Inspired by Tour de France, the monthly publication "Car Magazine" held in August 1910 the first edition of "Circuit Wallachia". The competition took 12 riders at the start on the route Bucharest–Sinaia–Târgoviște–Butimanu–Bucharest (approximately 300 km or 190 mi). The race lasted for three editions. Since 1934 the newspaper "Daily Sport", in collaboration with Romanian Cycling Federation has organized the Tour of Romania.

The route of first edition was 1,026 km (638 mi) long and included six stages.

The 2026 edition, for the first time in the history of the competition, will start outside Romania, in Moldova.

== Statistics ==
- The longest route was the 3rd edition in 1936 at 2,242 km (1,393 mi).
- The shortest route was 430 km (270 mi), in the 29th edition of 1991.
- At the 19th edition of 1973, Cluj, a stage was held nocturnal on the 27.3 km (17.0 mi) distance.
- Rider Traian Chicomban of Brașov participated in the January edition (1934) until the 9th edition (1954), as the Tour's longest-running participation of Romania.
- 45th edition (2008) was the first edition which was featured in the calendar Union Cycliste Internationale.

== Winners ==
Year	Country	Rider	Team
1934	Bulgaria	Marin Nikolov	Bulgaria (national team)
1935	Poland	Daniel Zigmund	Poland (national team)
1936	France	Pierre Gallien	France (national team)
1937; 1945	No race		
1946	Yugoslavia	August Prosenik	Yugoslavia (national team)
1947; 1949	No race		
1950	Romania	Constantin Sandu	C.C.A.
1951	Romania	Marin Niculescu	Flamura Roșie București
1952	No race		
1953	Romania	Nicolae Vasilescu	CS Dinamo București
1954	Romania	Constantin Dumitrescu	CS Progresul București
1955	Romania	Constantin Dumitrescu	C.C.A.
1956	Romania	Constantin Dumitrescu	C.C.A.
1957	No race		
1958	Romania	Gabriel Moiceanu	CS Dinamo București
1959	Romania	Ion Cosma	CS Dinamo București
1960	Romania	Walter Ziegler	Romania (youth team)
1961	Romania	Ion Cosma	Romania (national team)
1962; 1965	No race		
1966	Romania	Georghe Suciu	Romania (national team)
1967	Romania	Emil Rusu	Romania (national team)
1968	Romania	Walter Ziegler	CS Dinamo București
1969	East Germany	Jurgen Wanzlik	East Germany (national team)
1970; 1972	No race		
1973	Romania	Vasile Teodor	Romania (national team)
1974	Romania	Mircea Romașcanu	Romania (youth team)
1975; 1982	No race		
1983	Romania	Mircea Romașcanu	CS Dinamo București
1984	Romania	Constantin Căruțașu	Romania (national team)
1985	Romania	Mircea Romașcanu	Romania (national team)
1986	East Germany	Frank Schonherr	Vorw
1987	Romania	Valentin Constantinescu	Romania (national team)
1988	Romania	Vasile Mitrache	Romania (national team)
1989	Romania	Dănuț Cătană	Romania (national team)
1990	Romania	Vasile Apostol	CS Dinamo București
1991	Moldova	Svetoslav Riabuchenko	Viitorul Chișinău
1992	Ukraine	Vladimir Perelalsny	Bulgaria (national team)
1993	Germany	Jurgen Koberschinski	Germany (national team)
1994	Romania	Anton Stelian	Romania (national team)
1995	Ukraine	Igor Mitianin	Ukraine (national team)
1996	No race		
1997	Romania	Florin Privache	Romania (national team)
1998	Moldova	Igor Bonciucov	Moldova (national team)
1999	Kazakhstan	Sergey Tretyakov	Brisaspor
2000	Kazakhstan	Vadim Kravchenko	Brisaspor
2001	Ukraine	Leonid Timchenko	Ukraine (national team)
2002	Moldova	Alexandru Sabalin	Moldova (national team)
2003	Netherlands	Jelle Groezen	Netherlands (national team)
2004	Bulgaria	Vladimir Koev	Bulgaria (national team)
2005	Bulgaria	Ivaïlo Gabrovski	Hemus 1896-Aurora 2000 Berchi
2006	Bulgaria	Pavel Shumanov	Cycling Club Bourgas
2007	Romania	Daniel Anghelache	CS Dinamo București
2008	Hungary	Rida Cador	P-Nívó-Betonexpressz 2000-Corratec
2009	Russia	Alexey Shchebelin	SP Tableware-Gatsoulis Bikes
2010	Bulgaria	Vladimir Koev	Hemus 1896-Vivelo
2011	Romania	Andrei Nechita	Romania (national team)
2012	Croatia	Matija Kvasina	Ukraine (national team)
2013	Ukraine	Vitaliy Buts	Kolss Cycling Team
2014; 2017	No race		
2018	Romania	Serghei Țvetcov	UnitedHealthcare
2019	Netherlands	Alex Molenaar	Azerion / Villa Valkenburg
2020	Romania	Eduard Grosu	Romania (national team)
2021	Poland	Jakub Kaczmarek	HRE Mazowsze Serce Polski
2022	Great Britain	Mark Stewart	Bolton Equities Black Spoke Pro Cycling
2023	No race		
2024	Kazakhstan	Ilkhan Dostiyev	Astana Qazaqstan Development Team
2025	Italy	Cesare Chesini	MBH Bank Ballan CSB
2026	Hungary	Barnabás Vas	Team United Shipping

By nationality
Nationality	No. of wins
Romania	28
Bulgaria	5
Ukraine	4
Moldova	3
Kazakhstan	3
Hungary	2
Netherlands	2
East Germany	2
Poland	2
France	1
Croatia	1
Russia	1
Germany	1
Yugoslavia	1
United Kingdom	1
Italy	1

== Classifications ==
The jerseys worn by the leaders of the individual classifications are:

- Yellow Jersey – Worn by the leader of the general classification.
- Red Jersey – Worn by the leader of the points classification.
- Green Jersey – Worn by the leader of the climber classification.
- White Jersey – Worn by the best rider under 23 years of age on the overall classification.
- Blue Jersey – Worn by the best Romanian rider of the overall classification.
