= Tour of Bulgaria =

Annual bicycle race

Race details
- Date: September
- Region: Bulgaria
- English name: Tour of Bulgaria
- Local name: Обиколка на България (in Bulgarian)
- Discipline: Road
- Competition: UCI Europe Tour 2.2
- Type: Stage race
- Web site: www.tourofbulgaria.com

History
- First edition: 1924
- Editions: 72 (as of 2026)
- First winner: Georgi Abadzhiev (BUL); Kosta Djulgerov (BUL)
- Most wins: Ivailo Gabrovski (BUL) (5 wins)
- Most recent: Antoni Muryj (POL)

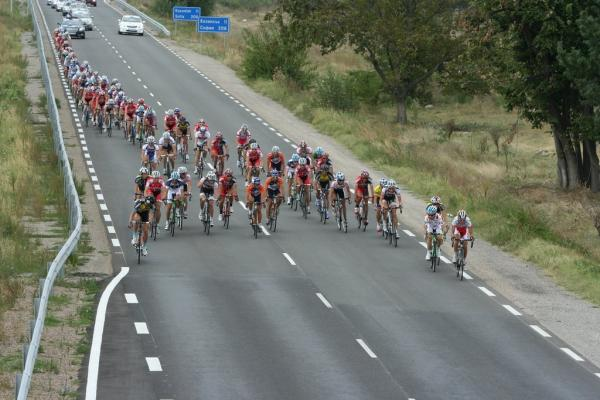
Tour of Bulgaria 2010 Stage 4

The Tour of Bulgaria is an annual international professional bicycle race held in Bulgaria that was first staged on 21 August 1924. It is part of UCI Europe Tour and is category 2.2. The race covers about 1,500 kilometres and lasts two weeks. As of 2017, 66 editions were held. The longest length of the race was in 1949 – 1905 km. The course changes every year, but the race has always started in Sofia.

In the race, cyclists from more than 40 countries have been competing. During the Cold War, the Tour of Bulgaria was one of the most prestigious cycling races in Europe, drawing skilled cyclists from the countries that traditionally produce strong racers, such as Italy, France and Netherlands. Although after the changes in 1989 the race lost some of its prestige for the cyclists in the peloton, nowadays it becomes more and more attractive for them. For example, in 2010 Francisco Mancebo who finished second in the 2004 Vuelta a España and fourth in the 2005 Tour de France, competed in it but only succeeded to finish third after the Bulgarian Krasimir Vasilev and Ricardo Mestre.

In 2017, the race was split into two three-day races based on geographical location.

== Directors ==
2015 Vladimir Kuvalja director = Vladimir Kuvalja

== Winners ==
=== Tour of Bulgaria ===
Year	Country	Rider	Team
1924	Bulgaria	Georgi Abadzhiev	
1924	Bulgaria	Kosta Djulgerov	
1925; 1934	No race		
1935	Bulgaria	Marin Nikolov	
1936; 1948	No race		
1949	Bulgaria	Milko Dimov	
1950	Bulgaria	Milko Dimov	
1951; 1954	No race		
1955	Bulgaria	Stoyan Georgiev	
1956	Bulgaria	Dimitar Kolev	
1957	Bulgaria	Nentcho Christov	
1958	Bulgaria	Bojan Kozev	
1959	Bulgaria	Bojan Kozev	
1960	Bulgaria	Bojan Kozev	
1961	Bulgaria	Dimitar Kolev	
1962	Bulgaria	Ivan Bobekov	
1963	No race		
1964	Bulgaria	Boris Botschev	
1965	Czechoslovakia	Jiří Háva	
1966	Bulgaria	Ivan Bobekov	
1967	Czechoslovakia	Ján Wenczel	
1968	Bulgaria	Vesko Kutuev	
1969	Italy	Selvino Poloni	
1970	Netherlands	Fedor den Hertog	
1971	Poland	Ryszard Szurkowski	
1972	Bulgaria	Ivan Popov	
1973	Soviet Union	Ivan Skosirev	
1974	Soviet Union	Rinat Charafulin	
1975	Poland	Janusz Kowalski	
1976	Soviet Union	Alexandre Gusiatnikov	
1977	East Germany	Siegbert Schmeisser	
1978	Bulgaria	Nentcho Staykov	
1979	Soviet Union	Yuri Barinov	
1980	Bulgaria	Nentcho Staykov	
1981	Soviet Union	Boris Issaev	
1982	Soviet Union	Leon Deschitz	
1983	Bulgaria	Venelin Chubenov	
1984	Bulgaria	Nentcho Staykov	
1985	Bulgaria	Petar Petrov	
1986	Bulgaria	Boyko Angelov	
1987	Bulgaria	Petar Petrov	
1988	Bulgaria	Valentin Shivkov	
1989	France	Didier Pasgrimaud	
1990	Bulgaria	Pavel Shumanov	
1991	Yugoslavia	Aleksandar Milenković	
1992	Bulgaria	Pavel Shumanov	
1993	Netherlands	Mano Lubbers	
1994	Bulgaria	Hristo Zaikov	
1995	Bulgaria	Hristo Zaikov	
1996	Bulgaria	Hristo Zaikov	
1997	Bulgaria	Pavel Shumanov	
1998	Bulgaria	Krassimir Vassiliev	
1999	Kazakhstan	Maxim Gourov	
2000	Poland	Seweryn Kohut	
2001	Bulgaria	Dimitar Dimitrov Gospodinov	
2002	Bulgaria	Dimitar Dimitrov Gospodinov	
2003	Bulgaria	Ivailo Gabrovski	
2004	Poland	Tomasz Kloczko	Dominscout-Sniezka-Lody
2005	Slovakia	Martin Prázdnovský	CK ZP Sport A.S. Podbrezova
2006	Bulgaria	Ivailo Gabrovski	CC Nessebar
2007	Bulgaria	Evgeni Gerganov	Cycling Club Bourgas
2008	Bulgaria	Ivailo Gabrovski	CC Nessebar
2009	Bulgaria	Ivailo Gabrovski	Heraklion-Nessebar
2010	Bulgaria	Krassimir Vassiliev	SK Dobrich
2011	Bulgaria	Ivailo Gabrovski	Heraklion-Nessebar
2012	Kazakhstan	Maxat Ayazbayev	Continental Team Astana
2013	France	Rémy Di Gregorio	Team Martigues SC-Vivelo
2014	No race		
2015	Bulgaria	Stefan Hristov	Brisaspor
2016	Italy	Marco Tecchio	Unieuro–Wilier
2017; North	Ukraine	Sergiy Lagkuti	Kolss Cycling Team
2017; South	Ukraine	Vitaliy Buts	Kolss Cycling Team
2018; 2019	No race		
2020	Poland	Patryk Stosz	Voster ATS Team
2021	Germany	Immanuel Stark	P&S Metalltechnik
2022	Ukraine	Kyrylo Tsarenko	Gallina Ecotek Lucchini
2023	Czech Republic	Michal Schuran	ATT Investments
2024	Italy	Matteo Malucelli	JCL Team UKYO
2025	Greece	Nikiforos Arvanitou	Team United Shipping
2026	Poland	Antoni Muryj	Mazowsze Serce Polski
