= List of teams and cyclists in the 1936 Tour de France =

List of cyclists

The riders were divided into two categories: the national teams and the touriste-routiers. There were four big national teams with 10 cyclists each: the Belgian team, the German team, the Spanish/Luxembourgian team and the French team. There were also five small teams of 4 cyclists each: the Swiss team, the Dutch team, the Yugoslavian team, the Romanian team and the Austrian team. For the Dutch, Yugoslavian and Romanian teams, it was the first participation ever. The Italian team was absent for political reasons (the Second Italo-Abyssinian War). An Italian team consisting of Italians living in France had been allowed to the race and even had jersey numbers designated, but finally the Tour organisers changed their minds.

== By rider ==
Legend
No.	Starting number worn by the rider during the Tour
Pos.	Position in the general classification
DNF	Denotes a rider who did not finish

No.	Name	Nationality	Team	Pos.	Ref
1	Romain Maes	Belgium	Belgium	DNF	
2	Sylvère Maes	Belgium	Belgium	1	
3	Félicien Vervaecke	Belgium	Belgium	3	
4	Gustave Danneels	Belgium	Belgium	DNF	
5	Éloi Meulenberg	Belgium	Belgium	34	
6	Marcel Kint	Belgium	Belgium	9	
7	Cyriel Van Overberghe	Belgium	Belgium	26	
8	Albert Hendrickx	Belgium	Belgium	31	
9	François Neuville	Belgium	Belgium	19	
10	Robert Wierinckx	Belgium	Belgium	DNF	
11	Bruno Roth	Germany	Germany	DNF	
12	Otto Weckerling	Germany	Germany	DNF	
13	Erich Haendel	Germany	Germany	DNF	
14	Emil Kijewski	Germany	Germany	DNF	
15	Erich Bautz	Germany	Germany	DNF	
16	Karl Heide	Germany	Germany	DNF	
17	Rudolf Risch	Germany	Germany	DNF	
18	Hans Weiss	Germany	Germany	DNF	
19	Jupp Arents	Germany	Germany	DNF	
20	Fritz Funke	Germany	Germany	DNF	
21	Mariano Cañardo	Spain	Spain/Luxembourg	6	
22	Julián Berrendero	Spain	Spain/Luxembourg	11	
23	Salvador Molina	Spain	Spain/Luxembourg	DNF	
24	Fédérico Ezquerra	Spain	Spain/Luxembourg	17	
25	Emiliano Álvarez	Spain	Spain/Luxembourg	24	
26	Arsène Mersch	Luxembourg	Spain/Luxembourg	5	
27	Mathias Clemens	Luxembourg	Spain/Luxembourg	7	
28	Josy Kraus	Luxembourg	Spain/Luxembourg	DNF	
29	Pierre Clemens	Luxembourg	Spain/Luxembourg	4	
30	Jean Majerus	Luxembourg	Spain/Luxembourg	DNF	
31	Antonin Magne	France	France	2	
32	Georges Speicher	France	France	DNF	
33	Maurice Archambaud	France	France	DNF	
34	René Le Grevès	France	France	20	
35	Fernand Mithouard	France	France	DNF	
36	Pierre Cogan	France	France	16	
37	Robert Tanneveau	France	France	18	
38	Arthur Debruyckere	France	France	29	
39	Raoul Lesueur	France	France	14	
40	Paul Maye	France	France	33	
51	Paul Egli	Switzerland	Switzerland	DNF	
52	Theo Heimann	Switzerland	Switzerland	DNF	
53	Hans Martin	Switzerland	Switzerland	DNF	
54	Leo Amberg	Switzerland	Switzerland	8	
55	Albert van Schendel	Netherlands	Netherlands	15	
56	Antoon van Schendel	Netherlands	Netherlands	32	
57	Theo Middelkamp	Netherlands	Netherlands	23	
58	Albert Gijzen	Netherlands	Netherlands	DNF	
59	Stjepan Grgac	Kingdom of Yugoslavia	Yugoslavia	DNF	
60	Rudolf Fiket	Kingdom of Yugoslavia	Yugoslavia	DNF	
61	Stjepan Ljubić	Kingdom of Yugoslavia	Yugoslavia	DNF	
62	Franc Abulnar	Kingdom of Yugoslavia	Yugoslavia	DNF	
63	Virgil Marmocea	Kingdom of Romania	Romania	DNF	
64	Nicolae Tapu	Kingdom of Romania	Romania	DNF	
65	Constantin Tudose	Kingdom of Romania	Romania	DNF	
66	Gheorghe Hapciuc	Kingdom of Romania	Romania	DNF	
67	Max Bulla	Austria	Austria	DNF	
68	Karl Thallinger	Austria	Austria	DNF	
69	Frantz Dunder	Austria	Austria	DNF	
70	Albert Oblinger	Austria	Austria	DNF	
101	Abdel-Kader Abbes	France	Touriste-routier	42	
102	Alphonse Antoine	France	Touriste-routier	27	
103	Robert Belliard	France	Touriste-routier	DNF	
104	Charles Berty	France	Touriste-routier	25	
105	Décimo Bettini	France	Touriste-routier	DNF	
106	Aldo Bertocco	France	Touriste-routier	43	
107	Auguste Chavard	France	Touriste-routier	DNF	
108	Pierre Cloarec	France	Touriste-routier	22	
109	Robert Conan	France	Touriste-routier	DNF	
110	Marcel Walle	France	Touriste-routier	35	
111	Gabriel Dubois	France	Touriste-routier	39	
112	Sauveur Ducazeaux	France	Touriste-routier	37	
113	Amédée Fournier	France	Touriste-routier	DNF	
114	Fabien Galateau	France	Touriste-routier	40	
115	Dante Gianello	France	Touriste-routier	DNF	
116	Jean-Marie Goasmat	France	Touriste-routier	28	
117	Fernand Lemay	France	Touriste-routier	30	
118	Antoine Latorre	France	Touriste-routier	41	
119	Alphonse Leboulanger	France	Touriste-routier	DNF	
120	Léon Level	France	Touriste-routier	10	
121	Sylvain Marcaillou	France	Touriste-routier	12	
122	Yvan Marie	France	Touriste-routier	21	
123	Edmond Pagès	France	Touriste-routier	38	
124	Raymond Passat	France	Touriste-routier	36	
125	Remy Royer	France	Touriste-routier	DNF	
126	Gabriel Ruozzi	France	Touriste-routier	DNF	
127	Léon Theerlynck	France	Touriste-routier	DNF	
128	Louis Thiétard	France	Touriste-routier	13	
129	René Vietto	France	Touriste-routier	DNF	
130	Alfred Weck	France	Touriste-routier	DNF	
