= Tour of Yugoslavia =

Yearly bicycle race in Yugoslavia

Race details
- Region: Yugoslavia
- Local name: Utrka kroz Jugoslaviju (in Serbo-Croatian)
- Discipline: Road race
- Type: Stage race

History
- First edition: 1937
- Final edition: 2000
- First winner: August Prosenik (YUG)

Tour of Yugoslavia (Serbo-Croatian: Kroz Jugoslaviju) was a stage road bicycle race held annually in Yugoslavia. Launched in 1937, the race was held in 1938 and 1940 before interruption due to World War II. In 1947 the first post-war edition was held, and it continued to be organised every year until 2000. Although the race was an event for amateur cyclists during most of its history, it was opened to professional riders in 1998.

== Tour of Croatia and Slovenia ==
The race started as Tour of Croatia and Slovenia (Po Hrvatski in Sloveniji/Kroz Hrvatsku i Sloveniju) in 1937 in 1938. It was held also in 1940, but just on territory of Croatia.

Year	First	Second	Third
1937	August Prosenik	Stjepan Grgac	Franc Gartner
1938	Drago Davidović	Nikola Penčev	Zorko Mihelčič
1940	Nikola Penčev	Branko Debanić	Ivan Zaborski

== Winners ==
Year	First	Second	Third
1947	(Socialist Federal Republic of Yugoslavia) Antonio Strain	(Socialist Federal Republic of Yugoslavia) Ivan Valant	(Socialist Federal Republic of Yugoslavia) Ivan Rebković
1948	(Socialist Federal Republic of Yugoslavia) Aleksandar Zorić	(Socialist Federal Republic of Yugoslavia) August Prosenik	(Socialist Federal Republic of Yugoslavia) Antonio Strain
1949	(Italy) Luigi Malabrocca	(Socialist Federal Republic of Yugoslavia) Milan Cok	(Socialist Federal Republic of Yugoslavia) Antonio Strain
1950	(Italy) Franco Fanti	(Socialist Federal Republic of Yugoslavia) Franjo Varga	(Italy) Luigi Malabrocca
1951	(Belgium) Robert Marguillier	(France) Francis Siguenza	(Belgium) Cyril Vanbossel
1953	(West Germany) Frantz Reitz	(Socialist Federal Republic of Yugoslavia) Veselin Petrović	(Belgium) Henri van Kerkhove
1954	(Socialist Federal Republic of Yugoslavia) Veselin Petrović	(Netherlands) Florent van der Weyden	(Italy) Gianni Ghidini
1955	(Austria) Walter Müller	(Socialist Federal Republic of Yugoslavia) Franjo Varga	(Bulgaria) Ilia Krestev
1956	(Belgium) Kamiel Buysse	(Austria) Stefan Mascha	(Socialist Federal Republic of Yugoslavia) Veselin Petrović
1957	(East Germany) Bernd Trefflich	(Socialist Federal Republic of Yugoslavia) Ivan Levačić	(Austria) Stefan Mascha
1958	(Socialist Federal Republic of Yugoslavia) Nevio Valčić	(Netherlands) Jan Hugens	(Socialist Federal Republic of Yugoslavia) Janez Žirovnik
1959	(Bulgaria) Nentcho Christov	(Bulgaria) Bojan Kotcev	(Socialist Federal Republic of Yugoslavia) Ivan Levačić
1960	(Socialist Federal Republic of Yugoslavia) Janez Žirovnik	(Socialist Federal Republic of Yugoslavia) Ivan Levačić	(Socialist Federal Republic of Yugoslavia) Nevio Valčić
1961	(Socialist Federal Republic of Yugoslavia) Ivan Levačić	(Socialist Federal Republic of Yugoslavia) Nevio Valčić	(Hungary) Antal Megyerdi
1962	(Socialist Federal Republic of Yugoslavia) Franc Škerlj	(Italy) Primo Nardello	(Socialist Federal Republic of Yugoslavia) Jože Šebenik
1963	(Socialist Federal Republic of Yugoslavia) Andrej Boltežar	(Socialist Federal Republic of Yugoslavia) Jože Roner	(Socialist Federal Republic of Yugoslavia) Ivan Levačić
1964	(Socialist Federal Republic of Yugoslavia) Rudi Valenčič	(Socialist Federal Republic of Yugoslavia) Franc Škerlj	(Bulgaria) Hristo Iliev
1965	(Socialist Federal Republic of Yugoslavia) Cvitko Bilić	(Socialist Federal Republic of Yugoslavia) Andrej Boltežar	(Italy) Luigi Bollasina
1966	(Socialist Federal Republic of Yugoslavia) Radoš Čubrić	(Socialist Federal Republic of Yugoslavia) Cvitko Bilić	(Socialist Federal Republic of Yugoslavia) Rudi Valenčič
1967	(Socialist Federal Republic of Yugoslavia) Franc Škerlj	(Socialist Federal Republic of Yugoslavia) Stoné Bozicnic	(Socialist Federal Republic of Yugoslavia) Radoš Čubrić
1968	(Socialist Federal Republic of Yugoslavia) Rudi Valenčič	(Sweden) Gösta Pettersson	(Bulgaria) Anatas Savtchev
1969	(Netherlands) Joop Zoetemelk	(Hungary) András Takács	(Soviet Union) Vladislav Nelyubin
1970	(Socialist Federal Republic of Yugoslavia) Radoš Čubrić	(Poland) Henryk Wozniak	(Netherlands) Hennie Kuiper
1971	(Socialist Federal Republic of Yugoslavia) Cvitko Bilić	(Soviet Union) Nikolay Gorelov	(Poland) Józef Gawliczek
1972	(Soviet Union) Yuri Lavrushkin	(Soviet Union) Rinat Charafuline	(Poland) Stanisław Labocha
1973	(Soviet Union) Boris Shukhov	(Soviet Union) Igor Moskalev	(Socialist Federal Republic of Yugoslavia) Janez Zirovnik
1974	(Czechoslovakia) Jaroslav Poslusný	(Austria) Wolfgang Steinmayr	(Italy) Vito Di Tano
1975	(Czechoslovakia) Petr Matoušek	(Czechoslovakia) Jaroslav Poslusný	(Soviet Union) Valery Likhachov
1976	(Soviet Union) Aleksandr Averin	(Socialist Federal Republic of Yugoslavia) Drago Frelih	(Soviet Union) Aleksandr Gusyatnikov
1977	(Soviet Union) Aleksandr Gusyatnikov	(France) Philippe Bodier	(Soviet Union) Aleksandr Averin
1978	(Soviet Union) Aavo Pikkuus	(Soviet Union) Sergey Nikitenko	(Soviet Union) Aleksandr Averin
1979	(Soviet Union) Sergueï Morozov	(Soviet Union) Said Gusseinov	(Soviet Union) Ramazan Galaletdinov
1980	(Socialist Federal Republic of Yugoslavia) Bojan Ropret	(Soviet Union) Andrei Vedernikov	(Soviet Union) Nikolai Anisimov
1981	(Soviet Union) Riho Suun	(Soviet Union) Piotr Ugrumov	(Socialist Federal Republic of Yugoslavia) Vinko Polončič
1982	(Soviet Union) Nikolai Kossiakov	(Socialist Federal Republic of Yugoslavia) Vinko Polončič	(Socialist Federal Republic of Yugoslavia) Janez Lampič
1983	(Socialist Federal Republic of Yugoslavia) Primož Čerin	(Socialist Federal Republic of Yugoslavia) Janez Lampič	(Hungary) László Halász
1984	(Socialist Federal Republic of Yugoslavia) Bruno Bulić	(Socialist Federal Republic of Yugoslavia) Primož Čerin	(Socialist Federal Republic of Yugoslavia) Jure Pavlič
1985	(Socialist Federal Republic of Yugoslavia) Jure Pavlič	(East Germany) Holger Müller	(Bulgaria) Nencio Staykov
1986	(Socialist Federal Republic of Yugoslavia) Jure Pavlič	(Socialist Federal Republic of Yugoslavia) Jože Smole	(Socialist Federal Republic of Yugoslavia) Srečko Glivar
1987	(East Germany) Olaf Jentzsch	(Czechoslovakia) Vladimír Kozárek	(Czechoslovakia) Miroslav Vašiček
1988	(Socialist Federal Republic of Yugoslavia) Sandi Papež	(Soviet Union) Pavel Tonkov	(Netherlands) Jos van Aert
1989-1993	Not held		
1994	(United States) Eddy Gragus	(Ukraine) Sergiy Matveyev	(Russia) Dimitri Sedun
1996	(Moldova) Ruslan Ivanov	(Ukraine) Igor Tchoukliantchev	(Russia) Alexandre Botcharov
1997	(Russia) Nikolai Koudriavtsev		
1998	(Ukraine) Alexandre Rotar	(Slovenia) Boris Premuzic	(Ukraine) Kyrylo Pospyeyev
1999	(Slovakia) Milan Dvorščík	(Poland) Kazimierz Stafiej	(Poland) Andrzej Mierzejewski
2000	(Slovenia) Igor Kranjec	(Ukraine) Anatoli Varvaruk	(Poland) Sławomir Kohut
