= Soviet Union National Road Race Championships =

Cycling competition

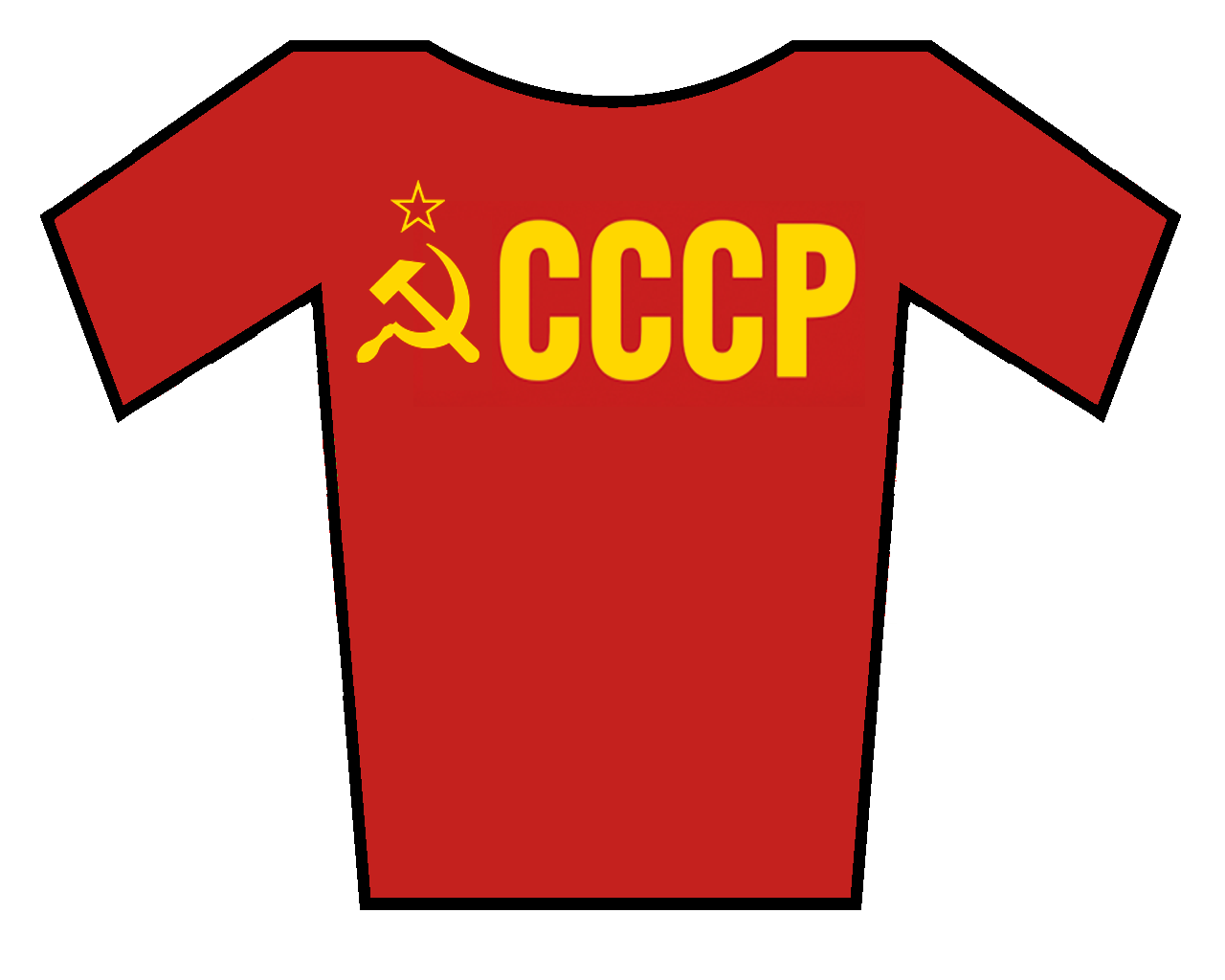
The champion's jersey

The Soviet Union National Road Race Championships were cycling races that were held annually to determine the Soviet cycling champion in road racing, across several categories of riders. The event was first held in 1947 and was won by Vladimir Lassi. Up until 1989 the Soviet cyclists were not allowed to compete as professionals so all the national championships were classed as amateur events. From 1989 until the dissolution of the Soviet Union in 1991 the race was considered professional.

== Men ==
=== Amateur (1947 to 1989) ===
This list is as complete a possible with the sources available. Source:

Year	Gold	Silver	Bronze
1947	Vladimir Lassi		
1948	Rodislav Tchizikov		
1949	Alexei Ryshakov		
1950	Rodislav Tchizikov		
1951	Nikolai Matvejev		
1952	Vladimir Krjutschkov		
1953	Leonid Kolumbet		
1954	Rodislav Tchizikov		
1955	Anatoli Tcherepovitch		
1956	Yuri Koledov	Boris Biebienin	Leonid Kolumbet
1957	Pavel Vostriakov	Georg Vinnik	Vladimir Krioutschkov
1958	Viktor Kapitonov		
1959	Viktor Kapitonov	Ants Väravas	Alexei Stepanovitch Petrov
1960	Alexei Podjablonski	Ants Väravas	Alexander Pavlov
1961	Yury Melikhov	Anatoli Tcherepovitch	Gainan Saidkhuzhin
1962	Alexei Stepanovitch Petrov		
1963	Gainan Saidkhuzhin	Adolf Liyuty	
1964	Ants Väravas	Gainan Saidkhuzhin	Alexandre Kulibin
1965	Nikolai Fadejev		
1966	Aljaksej Dokljakou		
1967	Alexei Stepanovitch Petrov		
1968	Jan Klassepp		
1969	Alexander Kulibin		
1970	Oleg Trichin		
1971	Jurij Dmytrijew		
1972	Nikolai Krasksov	Serguei Morozov	Evgeni Smetanin
1973	Anatoly Starkov	Youri Mikhailov	Yuri Lavrushkin
1974	Boris Issaev		
1975	Vitaoutas Galinaouskas	Nikolay Gorelov	Boris Issaev
1976	Aleksandr Averin	Serguei Morozov	Said Gusseinov
1977	Aavo Pikkuus		
1978	Sergei Sukhoruchenkov		
1979	Aleksandr Gusyatnikov	(Italy) Gianni Giacomini	Aleksandr Averin
1980	Leon Dejits	Yuri Barinov	Ramazan Galialetdinov
1981	Igor Bokov	Yury Kashirin	Sergei Prybyl
1982	Riho Suun		
1983	Sergei Ermatchenkov	Riho Suun	Andrei Toporischev
1984	Alexander Zinoviev	Oleg Logvin	Djamolidine Abdoujaparov
1985	Sergei Smievtkov	Andrei Toporischev	Guennadi Tarassov
1986	Piotr Ugrumov	Arvi Tammesalu	Dimitri Konyshev
1987	Djamolidine Abdoujaparov	Riho Suun	Piotr Ugrumov
1988	Vladimir Goluschko	Uldis Ansons	Asiat Saitov
1989	Viktor Klimov	Konstantin Bankin	Vladimir Diatchenko

=== Professional (1989 to 1991) ===
Year	Gold	Silver	Bronze
1989	Ivan Ivanov	Dimitri Konyshev	Riho Suun
1990	Dimitri Konyshev	Piotr Ugrumov	Vladimir Poulnikov
1991	Andrei Tchmil	Viatcheslav Ekimov	Piotr Ugrumov

== 1992 onward ==
Following on from the Dissolution, each country started their own national championships in the year's following.

- Azerbaijani National Road Race Championships
- Belarusian National Road Race Championships
- Estonian National Road Race Championships
- Georgian National Road Championships
- Kazakhstan National Road Race Championships
- Latvian National Road Race Championships
- Lithuanian National Road Race Championships
- Moldovan National Road Race Championships
- Russian National Road Race Championships
- Ukrainian National Road Race Championships
- Uzbekistan National Road Race Championships
