= Yugoslav National Road Race Championships =

The Yugoslav National Road Race Championship was a cycling race where the Yugoslav cyclists decide who will become the champion for the year to come. The event was established in 1919. The winners of each event were awarded with a symbolic cycling jersey which was in the colours of the national flag. Most of the top riders came from the territories of today's Croatia and Slovenia, where the majority of races were held.

== Men ==
| Year | Gold | Silver | Bronze |
| 1919 | Josip Pavlija | Kazimir Šoštarko | Milan Meniga |
| 1920 | Josip Pavlija | Albin Šiškovič | Josip Šolar |
| 1921 | Josip Pavlija | Koloman Sović | Kazimir Šoštarko |
| 1922 | Đuro Dukanović | Josip Pavlija | Kazimir Šoštarko |
| 1923 | Đuro Dukanović | Josip Pavlija | Kazimir Šoštarko |
| 1924 | Đuro Dukanović | Rudolf Truban | Janko Osrečki |
| 1925 | Josip Šolar | Antun Banek | Ivan Kranjc |
| 1926 | Antun Banek | Lucian Koržinek | Ivan Kranjc |
| 1927 | Antun Banek | Ivan Kosmatin | Ivan Kranjc |
| 1928 | Antun Banek | Stjepan Ljubić | Stjepan Srbljinović |
| 1929 | Slavko Šturman | Ivan Vranarinčić | Danilo Erdelji |
| 1930 | Stjepan Grgac | Drago Ivković | Milan Mikec |
| 1931 | Drago Ivković | Josip Jagar | Janko Oblak |
| 1932 | Stjepan Grgac | Drago Ivković | Milan Mikec |
| 1933 | Stjepan Grgac | Stjepan Ljubić | Franc Gartner |
| 1934 | Rudolf Fiket | Janko Oblak | Bruno Faninger |
| 1935 | Bruno Faninger | Drago Davidović | Stjepan Grgac |
| 1936 | August Prosenik | Antun Šimunović | Franc Gartner |
| 1937 | August Prosenik | Stjepan Grgac | Stjepan Ljubić |
| 1938 | Josip Pokupec | Franc Abulnar | Karel Lavrih |
| 1939 | Stjepan Grgac | August Prosenik | Josip Pokupec |
| 1940 | August Prosenik | Drago Davidović | Nikola Penčev |
| 1946 | Milan Poredski | S. Tomin | Antun Horvatek |
| 1947 | Aleksandar Zorić | Anton Strain | Jovan Trifunović |
| 1948 | Milan Poredski | Jovan Pavlik | Aleksandar Zorić |
| 1949 | Anton Strain | Milan Poredski | Josip Šolman |
| 1950 | Emil Osrečki | Zdravko Bat | Milan Poredski |
| 1951 | Franja Varga | Veselin Petrović | Jurij Lulik |
| 1952 | Milan Poredski | Veselin Petrović | Miro Grajzer |
| 1953 | Veselin Petrović | Branko Bat | Oreste Brajnik |
| 1954 | Silverio Delasanto | Josip Bajlo | Aleksandar Kulevski |
| 1955 | Miroslav Ješić | Josip Bajlo | Daniel Jugo |
| 1956 | Veselin Petrović | Nevio Valčić | Janez Žirovnik |
| 1957 | Nevio Valčić | Ivan Levačić | Veselin Petrović |
| 1958 | Nevio Valčić | Tomislav Milenković | Janez Žirovnik |
| 1959 | Nevio Valčić | Veselin Petrović | Ivan Levačić |
| 1960 | Janez Žirovnik | Ivan Levačić | Gavrilo Vukojević |
| 1961 | Janez Žirovnik | Jože Šebenik | Nevio Valčić |
| 1962 | Jože Šebenik | Šime Bajlo | Pavel Židan |
| 1963 | Šime Bajlo | Andrej Boltežar | Jože Roner |
| 1964 | Rudi Valenčič | Laslo Pavlik | Anton Španinger |
| 1965 | Laslo Pavlik | Radoš Čubrić | Rudi Valenčič |
| 1966 | Milivoj Pocrnja | Cvitko Bilić | Laslo Pavlik |
| 1967 | Rudi Valenčič | Cvitko Bilić | Toni Kunaver |
| 1968 | Franc Hvasti | Milivoj Pocrnja | Franc Škerlj |
| 1969 | Tanasije Kuvalja | Žika Milosavljević | Franc Hvasti |
| 1970 | Toni Kunaver | Cvitko Bilić | Stane Božičnik |
| 1971 | Antun Remer | Cvitko Bilić | Jože Valenčič |
| 1972 | Janez Zakotnik | Rudi Valenčič | Milovan Gazdić |
| 1973 | Pavel Keršić | Drago Frelih | Toni Kunaver |
| 1974 | Janez Zakotnik | Zdenko Kahlina | Jože Valenčič |
| 1975 | Jože Valenčič | Branko Bedeković | Tanasije Kuvalja |
| 1976 | Mirko Rakuš | Janez Zakotnik | Pavel Keršić |
| 1977 | Mirko Rakuš | Bojan Ropret | Franjo Horvat |
| 1978 | Bruno Bulić | Vinko Polončič | Drago Frelih |
| 1979 | Ivan Čolig | Vlado Pečnik | Vinko Polončič |
| 1980 | Stane Kurent | Ivan Čolig | Dragić Borovičanin |
| 1981 | Primož Čerin | Bruno Bulić | Mladen Lojen |
| 1982 | Bojan Ropret | Eduard Kišerlovski | Vlado Marn |
| 1983 | Bojan Udovič | Vlado Marn | Andrej Žavbi |
| 1984 | Andrej Žavbi | Primož Čerin | Janez Lampič |
| 1985 | Brane Ugrenovič | Bogdan Kralj | Robert Šebenik |
| 1986 | Sandi Papež | Marko Polanc | Srečko Glivar |
| 1987 | Jure Pavlič | Aleš Pagon | Robert Pintarič |
| 1988 | Robert Pintarič | Mićo Brković | Valter Bonča |
| 1989 | Srečko Glivar | Sandi Papež | Jure Robič |
| 1990 | Sandi Papež | Jure Robič | Robert Pintarič |
| 1991 | Sandi Šmerc | Aleš Pagon | Marko Polanc |

== See also ==
- National Road Cycling Championships
