= 1939 Tour de Serbie =

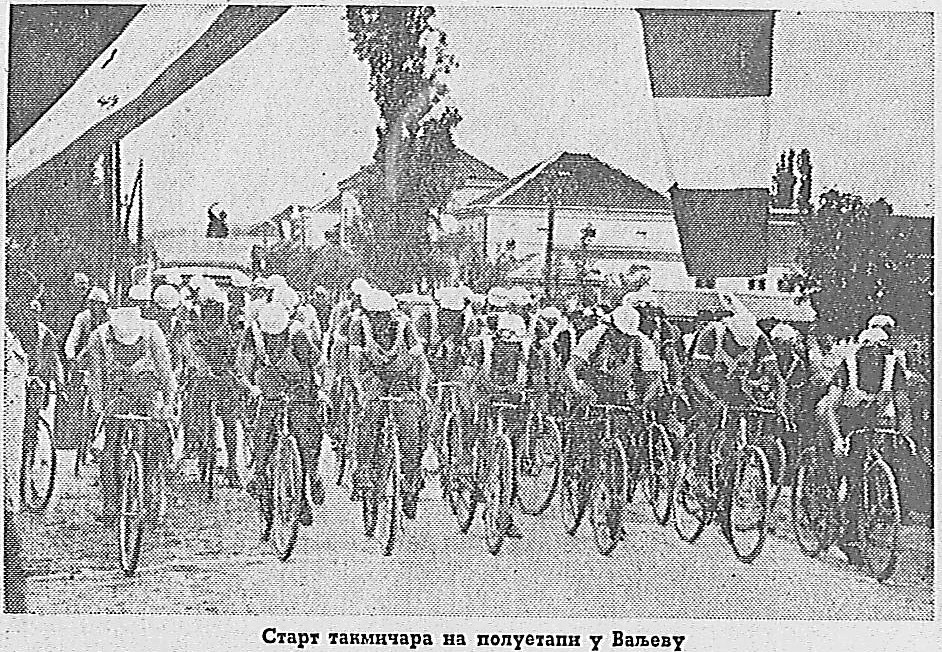
- Stage 1 (start of second half-stage in Valjevo)

Race details
- Dates: 22–29 May
- Stages: 6
- Distance: 1,014 km (630.1 mi)
- Winning time: 34hr 24' 22"

Results
Jersey awarded to the overall winner	Winner	August Prosenik (Kingdom of Yugoslavia)
	Second	Stjepan Grgac (Kingdom of Yugoslavia)
	Third	Karel Lavrih (Kingdom of Yugoslavia)

The 1939 Tour de Serbie (Serbian: Trka oko Srbije) was the 1st edition of the Tour de Serbie cycling stage race. It was scheduled from 22 to 29 May.

The winner of overall classification was August Prosenik.

== Schedule ==
Stage characteristics and winners
Stage	Date	Course	Distance	Winner
1	22 May	Belgrade - Valjevo - Požega	180 km (111.8 mi)	August Prosenik (YUG)
2	23 May	Požega - Kraljevo - Raška	177 km (110 mi)	Constantin Tudose (ROM)
3	24 May	Raška - Kosovska Mitrovica - Skopje	202 km (126 mi)	August Prosenik (YUG)
4	26 May	Skopje - Vranje - Niš	201 km (125 mi)	August Prosinek (YUG)
5	27 May	Niš - Paraćin - Kragujevac	130 km (81 mi)	August Prosenik (YUG)
6	28 May	Kragujevac - Belgrade	124 km (77 mi)	Josip Pokupec (YUG)
	Total		1,014 km (630 mi)	

== Final standings ==
=== General classification ===
	Rider	Team	Time
1	August Prosenik (YUG)	Zagreb	34h 24' 22"
2	Stjepan Grgac (YUG)	Zagreb	34h 41' 28"
3	Karel Lavrih (YUG)	Belgrade	34h 52' 28"
4	Constantin Tudose (ROM)	Romania	35h 02' 40"
5	Josip Pokupec (YUG)	Zagreb	35h 04' 07"
6	Ionel Cristea (ROM)	Romania	35h 16' 26"
7	Rade Veljković (YUG)	Belgrade	35h 23' 31"
8	Danilo Erdelji (YUG)	Borovo	35h 26' 16"
9	Janez Peternel (YUG)	Ljubljana	35h 28' 26"
10	Nikola Penčev (YUG)	Zagreb	35h 36' 15"
