= Milan Dvorščík =

Slovak cyclist (born 1970)

Personal information
- Born: 7 March 1970 (age 56) Považská Bystrica, Czechoslovakia
- Height: 1.75 m (5 ft 9 in)
- Weight: 68 kg (150 lb)

Cycling career
- Sport: Cycling
- Current team: Retired
- Discipline: Road
- Role: Rider

Professional teams
- 1998: Avianca–Telecom
- 1999: De Nardi–Pasta Montegrappa

Milan Dvorščík (born 7 March 1970) is a Slovak former racing cyclist. A professional from 1998 to 1999, he notably won the Tour of Yugoslavia in 1999. He also won a silver medal in the amateur road race at the 1994 UCI Road World Championships.

He participated in the 1996 and 2000 Summer Olympics, representing Slovakia.

== Major results ==
1987
1st Overall Tour du Pays de Vaud

1st Stage 3

1988
1st Stage 3 Tour du Pays de Vaud
1990
2nd Overall Okolo Slovenska
1994
2nd Amateur road race, World Road Championships
1999
1st Overall Tour of Yugoslavia

1st Stages 1 & 2

1st Prologue Tour du Faso
3rd Overall Tour de Serbie
2000
1st Stage 6 Tour of South China Sea
