= Primož Čerin =

Yugoslav cyclist (born 1962)

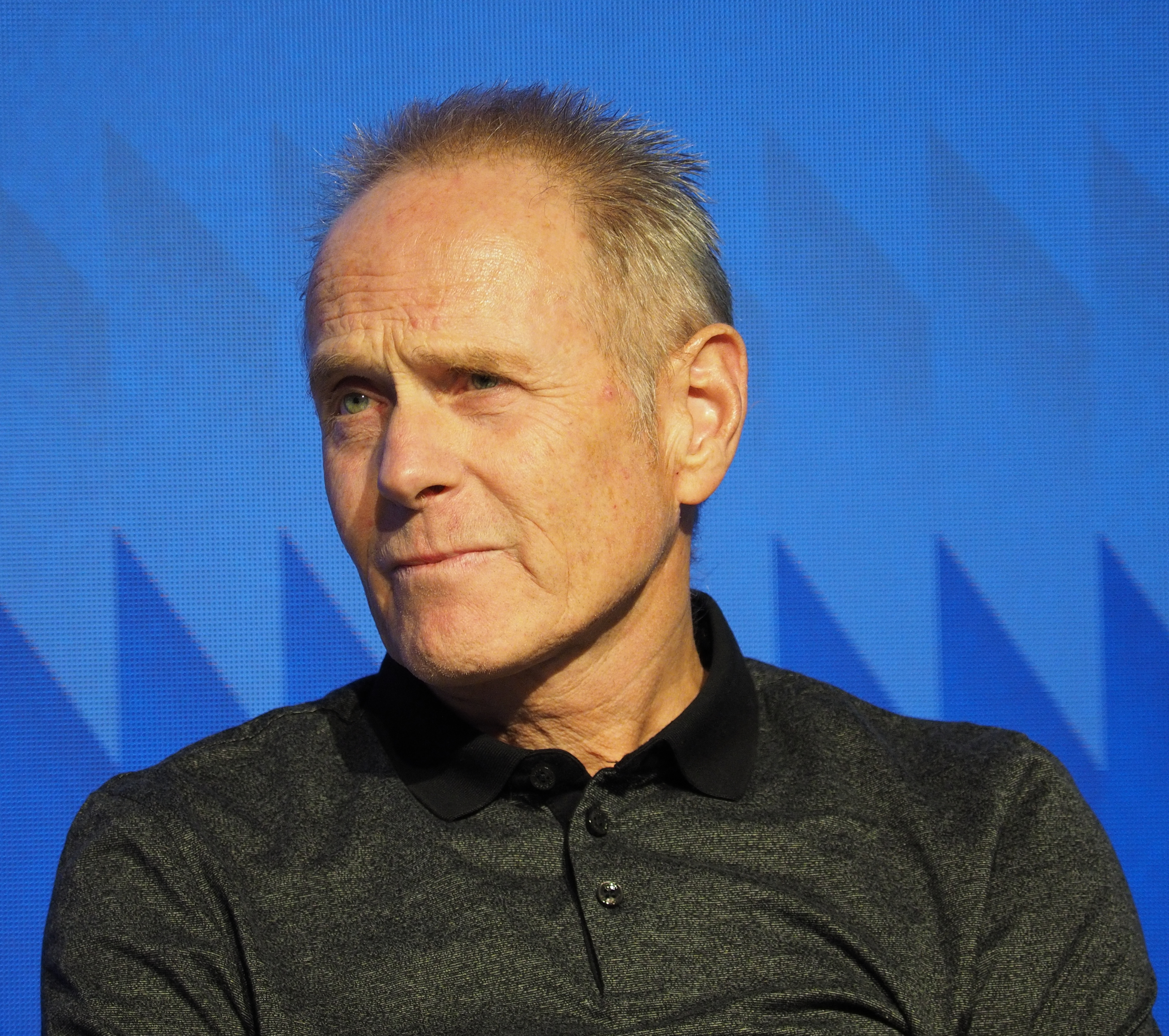

Personal information
- Born: 31 May 1962 (age 64) Ljubljana, Yugoslavia

Cycling career
- Sport: Cycling
- Discipline: Road
- Role: Rider

Amateur teams
- 1983–1984: Rog Ljubljana
- 1985: Zalf–Fior

Professional teams
- 1986–1987: Malvor–Bottecchia–Vaporella
- 1988–1990: Carrera Jeans–Vagabond

Primož Čerin (born 31 May 1962) is a Yugoslav former professional racing cyclist. He rode in two editions of the Tour de France, one edition of the Giro d'Italia and two editions of the Vuelta a España. His best result was 19th overall in the 1986 Giro d'Italia. He also competed in two events at the 1984 Summer Olympics.

== Major results ==
1981
1st Road race, Yugoslav National Road Championships
2nd GP Capodarco
1982
1st Road race, Yugoslav National Road Championships
1983
1st Overall Tour of Yugoslavia
1st Stage 7 Tour of Austria
2nd GP Capodarco
2nd Trofeo Zsšdi
1984
1st Overall Jadranska Magistrala
2nd Road race, Yugoslav National Road Championships
2nd Overall Tour of Yugoslavia
2nd Trofeo Zsšdi
1985
1st Trofeo Alcide Degasperi
2nd Overall Giro delle Regioni
2nd Trofeo Zsšdi
3rd Overall Tour of Austria

1st Stage 7

1986
3rd Giro del Trentino
9th Trofeo Laigueglia
1989
5th Overall Tour de Luxembourg
