= Čubrilović =

Čubrilović (Serbian Cyrillic: Чубриловић) is a Serbian surname, a patronymic derived from the name Čubrilo. It may refer to:

- Veljko Čubrilović (1895–1915), Bosnian Serb revolutionary involved in the assassination of Austrian Archduke Franz Ferdinand
- Vaso Čubrilović (1897–1990), Serbian scholar and Yugoslav politician. Veljko's brother, also participated in the assassination
- Branko Čubrilović (1894–1962), Yugoslav politician
- Nedeljko Čubrilović (born 1953), Bosnian Serb politician
- Nik Cubrilovic, Australian hacker and internet security expert

== See also ==
- Čubrić, surname
