= Aleksandar Nikačević =

Serbian cyclist (born 1978)

Personal information
- Born: 26 January 1978 (age 48) Kraljevo, Yugoslavia

Cycling career
- Sport: Cycling
- Current team: Retired
- Discipline: Road
- Role: Rider; Directeur sportif

Amateur teams
- 1999–2000: GS Padovani
- 1999: Mapei–Quick-Step (stagiaire)
- 2000: Alessio–Banca SMG (stagiaire)

Professional team
- 2001–2002: Alessio

Managerial teams
- 2005: Aerospace Engineering Pro Equipe
- 2006: Team Endeka

Aleksandar Nikačević (Serbian: Александар Никачевић; born 26 January 1978 in Kraljevo) is a Serbian former road cyclist. He competed professionally with Alessio from 2001 to 2002 and most notably won the Tour de Serbie in 2000 and 2002 as well as the Yugoslav National Road Race Championships in 2002. After retiring from racing, he worked as a directeur sportif for the Aerospace Engineering Pro Equipe and Team Endeka.

== Major results ==
1999
1st Overall Giro del Friuli Venezia Giulia

1st Stage 3

7th Time trial, UCI Road World Under-23 Championships
2000
Yugoslav National Road Championships

1st Time trial
2nd Road race

1st Overall Tour de Serbie
1st Trofeo Città di San Vendemiano
6th GP Palio del Recioto
2002
1st Road race, Yugoslav National Road Championships
1st Overall Tour de Serbie
1st Stage 3 Tour of Qinghai Lake
5th Overall Bayern Rundfahrt
