= Čubrić =

Čubrić (Serbian Cyrillic: Чубрић) is a Serbian surname, derived from the adjective čubar ("savory"), or a diminutive of the name Čubrilo. It may refer to:

- Radoš Čubrić (1934–2017), retired Yugoslav cyclist
- Rajko Čubrić (born 1958), retired Yugoslav cyclist
- Radiša Čubrić (born 1962), retired Serbian cyclist
- Josip Čubrić (1912–1941), Spanish fighter
