= 1940 Tour de Serbie =

Race details
- Dates: 29 August–6 September
- Stages: 8
- Distance: 1,342 km (833.9 mi)
- Winning time: 53hr 19' 35"

Results
Jersey awarded to the overall winner	Winner	Janez Peternel (Kingdom of Yugoslavia)
	Second	Franc Gartner (Kingdom of Yugoslavia)
	Third	Drago Davidović (Kingdom of Yugoslavia)

The 1940 Tour de Serbie (Serbian: Trka oko Srbije) was the 2nd edition of the Tour de Serbie cycling stage race. It was scheduled from 29 August to 6 September.

The winner of overall classification was Janez Peternel.

== Schedule ==
Stage characteristics and winners
Stage	Date	Course	Distance	Winner
1	29 August	Belgrade - Šabac - Zvornik	164 km (101.9 mi)	Dragoljub Davidović (YUG)
2	30 August	Zvornik - Sarajevo	148 km (92 mi)	Đorđe Drljačić (YUG)
3	31 August	Sarajevo - Višegrad - Čačak	253 km (157 mi)	Janez Peternel (YUG)
4	1 September	Čačak - Kosovska Mitrovica	176 km (109 mi)	Janez Peternel (YUG)
5	3 September	Kosovska Mitrovica - Skopje	136 km (85 mi)	Josip Pokupec (YUG)
6	4 September	Skopje - Vranje - Niš	201 km (125 mi)	Janez Peternel (YUG)
7	5 September	Niš - Kragujevac	142 km (88 mi)	Sava Pavlović (YUG)
8	6 September	Kragujevac - Belgrade	122 km (76 mi)	Dragoljub Davidović (YUG)
	Total		1,342 km (834 mi)	

== Final standings ==
=== General classification ===
	Rider	Team	Time
1	Janez Peternel (YUG)	Hermes Ljubljana	53h 19' 35"
2	Franc Gartner (YUG)	Ljubljanica Ljubljana	53h 30' 42"
3	Drago Davidović (YUG)	Sokol Zagreb	53h 56' 38"
4	Radivoje Veljković (YUG)	Jugoslavija Belgrade	54h 03' 27"
5	Franc Podmilščak (YUG)	Edinstvo Ljubljana	54h 04' 17"
6	Đorđe Drljačić (YUG)	Avala Belgrade	54h 22' 51"
7	Ivan Ujčić (YUG)	Jugoslavija Belgrade	54h 30' 20"
8	Đura Petrov (YUG)	NAK Novi Sad	54h 31' 43"
9	Boris Vojinov (YUG)	Jugoslavija Belgrade	54h 59' 05"
10	Armando Golob (YUG)	Edinstvo Ljubljana	55h 33' 59"
