= Zagradec =

Zagradec may refer to:

In Albania:

- Zagradeci, a village in the Mala Prespa area, known as Заградец (Zagradec) in Macedonian

In Italy:

- Sagrado di Sgonico, a frazione of Sgonico, known as Zagradec in Slovene

In Slovenia:

- Zagradec, Ivančna Gorica, a settlement in the Municipality of Ivančna Gorica
- Zagradec pri Grosupljem, a settlement in the Municipality of Grosuplje
