= Veselin Petrović =

Veselin Petrović may refer to:

- Veselin Petrović (basketball) (born 1977), Serbian basketball player
- Veselin Petrović (cyclist) (1929–1995), Serbian cyclist
