= Nentcho =

Nentcho or Nencho (Bulgarian: Ненчо) is a Bulgarian masculine given name. Notable people with the surname include:

- Nencho Staykov (born 1955), Bulgarian cyclist
- Nentcho Christov (1933–2002), Bulgarian cyclist
