= Josip Šolar =

Yugoslav cyclist (1903–1957)

Personal information
- Born: 18 March 1902 Ljubljana, Austria-Hungary
- Died: 1957 (aged 54–55)

Cycling career
- Sport: Cycling

Josip Šolar (18 March 1902 – 1957) was a Yugoslav cyclist. He rode for Ilirija Ljubljana and was Yugoslav National Road Race Champion in 1925. He also competed in the individual and team road race events at the 1928 Summer Olympics.
