= Riho Suun =

Estonian cyclist

Personal information
- Born: 27 April 1960 (age 66) Tartu, then part of Estonian SSR, Soviet Union

Cycling career
- Sport: Cycling
- Current team: Retired
- Discipline: Road
- Role: Rider

Professional teams
- 1989: Kelme
- 1990: Lada Ghzel

Riho Suun (born 27 April 1960) is an Estonian former cyclist. He represented the Soviet Union at the road race of the 1988 Summer Olympics.

== Major results ==
1980
1st Stage 4 Tour de l'Avenir
1981
1st Overall Tour of Yugoslavia
1st Stage 1 Okolo Slovenska
3rd Overall Tour de Luxembourg

1st Prologue

1982
1st Road race, Soviet National Road Championships
1st Stages 2 & 3 Peace Race
1st Stage 1 Tour de Sotchi
1983
2nd Road race, Soviet National Road Championships
1985
1st Stages 1, 5 & 10 Peace Race
2nd Overall Grand Prix Guillaume Tell

1st Stage 3

1988
8th Overall Tour of Sweden

1st Stage 2

1989
3rd Road race, Soviet National Road Championships
