= Montecchio Precalcino =

- Comune
- Comune di Montecchio Precalcino
- Location within Italy Location within Veneto
- Coordinates: 45°40′N 11°34′E
- Country: Italy
- Region: Veneto
- Province: Vicenza (VI)
- Frazioni: Levà, Preara

Government
  - Mayor: Fabrizio Parisotto (2014)

Area
  - Total: 14 km^{2} (5.4 sq mi)
- Elevation: 84 m (276 ft)

Population (31 December 2020)
  - Total: 4,947
  - Density: 350/km^{2} (920/sq mi)
- Time zone: UTC+1 (CET)
  - Summer (DST): UTC+2 (CEST)
- Postal code: 36030
- Dialing code: 0445
- Website: Official website

Montecchio Precalcino is a town and comune in the province of Vicenza, Veneto, Italy. It is situated on the west side of the Astico creek.

The main attraction is the patrician Villa Forni Cerato, attributed by some scholars to Andrea Palladio.

== People ==
- Sante Carollo (1924–2004), cyclist.
- Giovanni Anapoli, racing car driver.
- David Campese, rugby player.

== Sources ==
- Google Maps
