= Maglia nera =

Jersey awarded to the last placer at the Giro d'Italia

Maglia Nera
- Sport: Road Cycling
- Competition: Giro d'Italia
- Awarded for: Last overall
- English name: Black jersey
- Local name: Maglia Nera (in Italian)

History
- First award: 1946
- Editions: 6
- Final award: 1951
- First winner: Luigi Malabrocca (ITA)
- Most wins: Luigi Malabrocca (ITA) (2 times)
- Most recent: Giovanni Pinarello (ITA)

The Maglia Nera was a black jersey awarded as a symbolic prize in cycling competition at the Giro d'Italia, given to the last man to finish the race. It was allocated between 1946 and 1951. The competition for the jersey came from the time Italian soccer star Giuseppe Ticozzelli who competed in the 1926 Giro d'Italia as an independent while wearing his black jersey of the football team he played for (Casale). He completed three stages and would often take rest breaks for food, he had to drop out of the race after being run over by a vehicle.

There was real competition to win this particular jersey. Especially noted are the struggles between Sante Carollo and Luigi Malabrocca, to see who could waste the most time. Each tried to lose more time than the other by hiding in bars, barns, and behind hedges, or even by puncturing their own wheels. In 1948 the honor was awarded to the Tuscan Aldo Bini, who according to some journalists and fans of the time, stubbornly continued the race until the end, despite a broken right hand suffered in a mass crash, and the suffering that especially in the mountain stages forced him to get off the bike and push it uphill. The special ability of the black jersey was, in addition to not being "discovered", to reach the finish directly within the maximum time.

The term "maglia nera" was later used in other contexts to indicate the bottom club in a league, often giving it a negative connotation.

In 2008 a similar "black number" was introduced, won by Markus Eichler of Team Milram.

== Winners ==
Year	Rider	Team	Time
1946	Luigi Malabrocca (ITA)	Milan-Gazzetta	99h 41' 54"
1947	Luigi Malabrocca (ITA)	Welter	121h 47' 27"
1948	Aldo Bini (ITA)	Benotto	128h 59' 43"
1949	Sante Carollo (ITA)	Wilier Triestina	135h 22' 57"
1950	Mario Gestri (ITA)	Bartali	122h 28' 37"
1951	Giovanni Pinarello (ITA)	Bottecchia	124h 37' 48"

== See also ==
- Lanterne rouge
- Wooden spoon
