= Ants Väravas =

Estonian cyclist, coach and sport personnel

Ants Väravas (10 June 1937 – 20 August 2018) was an Estonian cyclist, coach and sport personnel.

He was born in Tallinn. In 1966 he graduated from Tallinn Pedagogical Institute's Faculty of Physical Education.

He began his sport career in 1952. His first coaches were Olav Karikosk and Nikolai Matvejev. He was Soviet Union reserve cyclist at 1964 Summer Olympic Games in Tokyo. 1960 and 1963 he won bronze medal at Peace Race, being a member of Soviet Union cycling team. He is multiple-times Soviet Union and Estonian champion in different cycling disciplines.

1966–1970 he was the head coach of Estonian national cycling team.

He is buried at Tallinn Forest Cemetery.
