= Luigi Malabrocca =

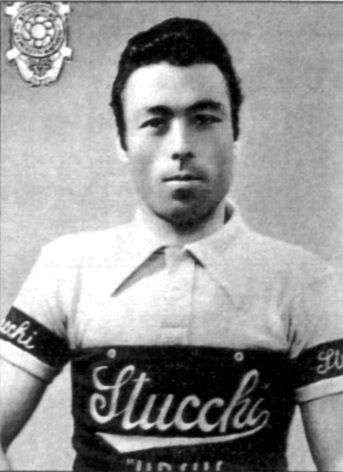

Personal information
- Born: 22 June 1920 Tortona, Italy
- Died: 1 October 2006 (aged 86) Garlasco, Italy

Cycling career
- Sport: Cycling
- Disciplines: Road; Cyclo-cross
- Role: Rider

Professional teams
- 1945: US Azzini
- 1945–1947: Welter
- 1948–1949: Rochet–Dunlop
- 1950–1953: Nilux
- 1954: Guerra–Ursus
- 1955–1958: Ignis

Major wins
- Cyclo-cross National Cyclo-cross Championships (1951, 1953) Road Grand Tours Giro d'Italia Maglia Nera classification (1946, 1947) Stage races Tour of Yugoslavia (1949) One-day races and Classics Coppa Ugo Agostoni (1948) Paris–Nantes (1947)

Luigi Malabrocca (22 June 1920 – 1 October 2006) was an Italian road cyclist.

He formed a rivalry with Sante Carollo for the Maglia nera at the Giro d'Italia. He 'won' the rivalry, earning the jersey twice to Carollo's once.

While noted for his rivalry, he was also an accomplished cyclist. He won the Italian National Cyclo-cross Championships in 1951 and 1953, as well as winning the 1947 Paris-Nantes, the 1948 Coppa Ugo Agostoni and the 1949 Tour of Yugoslavia.

== Major results ==
1943
6th Giro di Romagna
1946
9th Giro dell'Appennino
1947
1st Paris–Nantes
3rd Trofeo Baracchi
1948
1st Coppa Agostoni
1949
1st Overall Tour of Yugoslavia
1950
3rd National Cyclo-cross Championships
3rd Overall Tour of Yugoslavia
1951
1st National Cyclo-cross Championships
1st Gran Premio dell'Epifania
1953
1st National Cyclo-cross Championships
1st Gran Premio dell'Epifania
8th Tre Valli Varesine
1954
3rd National Cyclo-cross Championships
