= Jilava =

- Commune
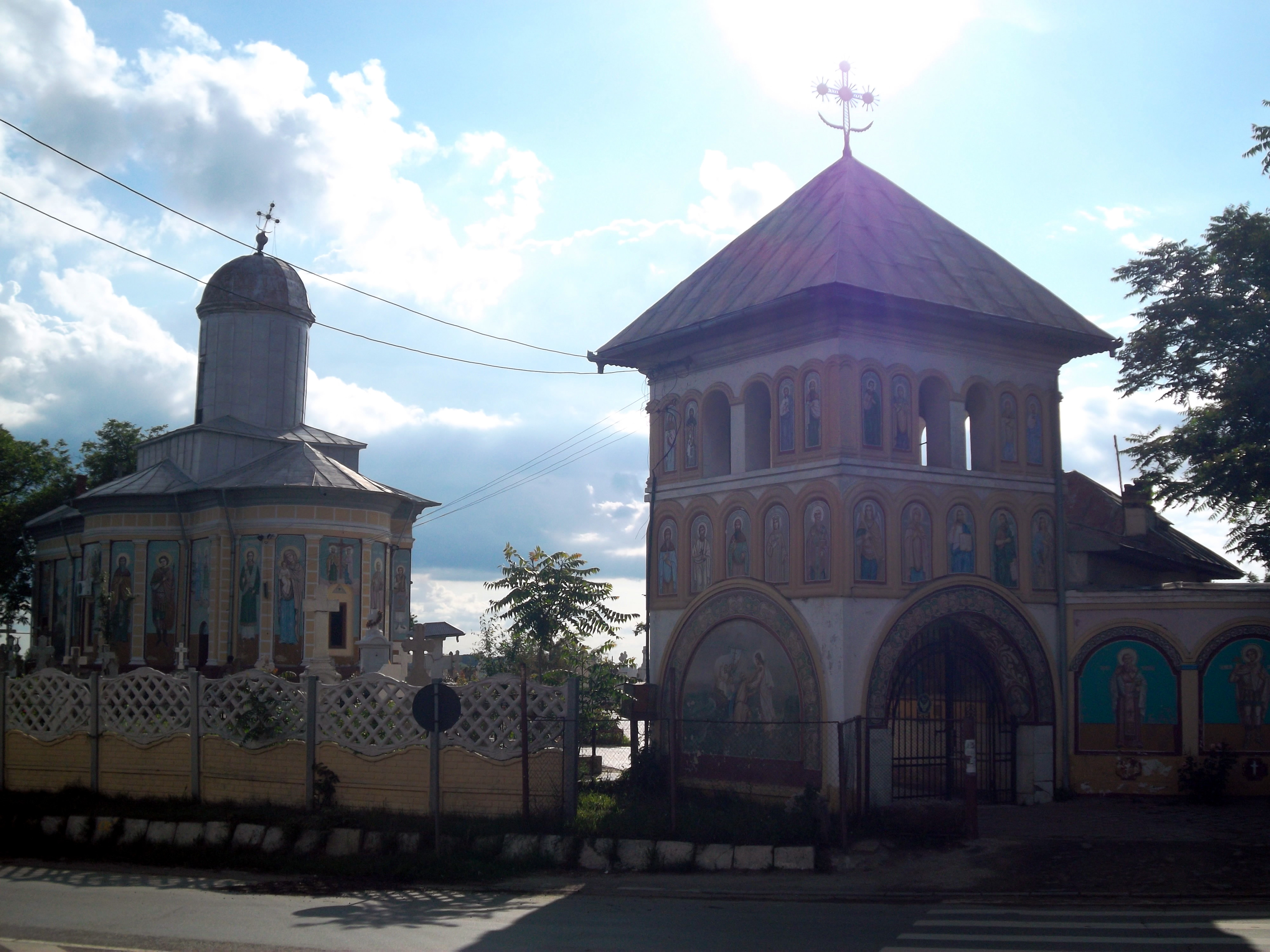
- Church of Saints Constantine and Helena

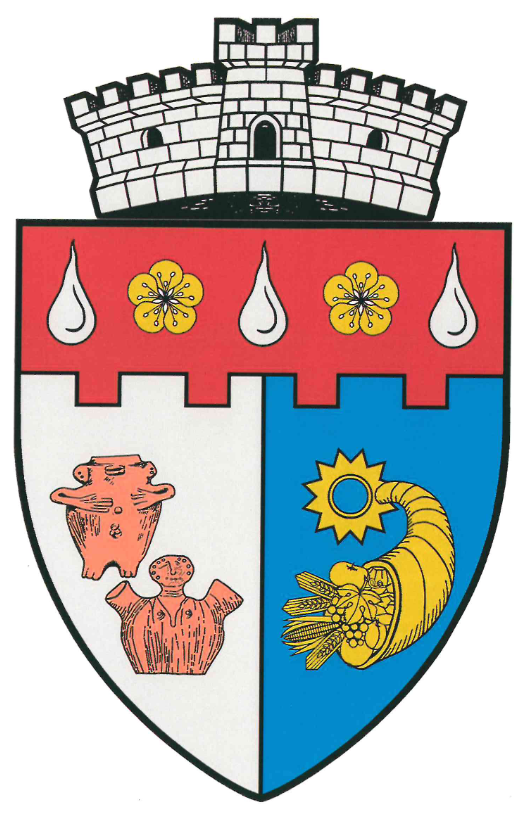
- Coat of arms

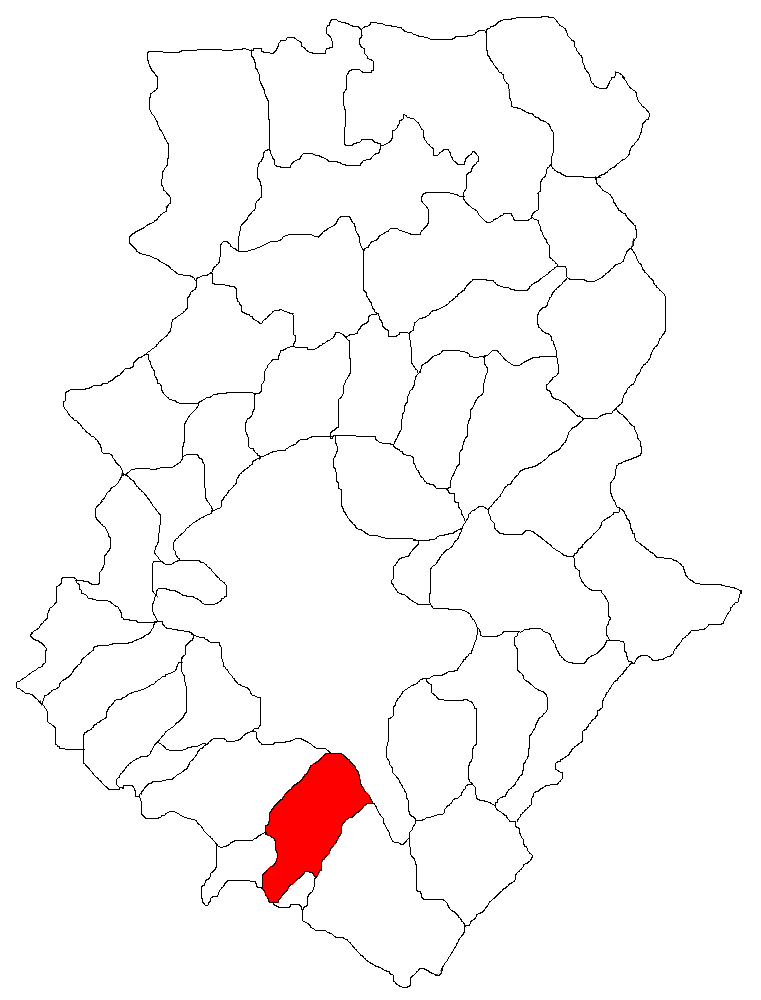
- Map of Ilfov County with Jilava commune highlighted

- Location in Romania
- Coordinates: 44°19′58″N 26°04′41″E
- Country: Romania
- County: Ilfov

Government
  - Mayor (2020–2024): Elefterie-Ilie Petre (PNL)
- Area: 26.76 km^{2} (10.33 sq mi)
- Elevation: 71 m (233 ft)
- Population (2021-12-01): 10,611
  - Density: 396.5/km^{2} (1,027/sq mi)
- Time zone: UTC+02:00 (EET)
  - Summer (DST): UTC+03:00 (EEST)
- Postal code: 077120
- Area code: +(40) 21
- Vehicle reg.: IF
- Website: primariajilava.ro

Jilava is a commune in Ilfov County, Muntenia, Romania, near Bucharest. It is composed of a single village, Jilava.

The name derives from a Romanian word of Slavic origin (Bulgarian жилав žilav (tough), which passed into Romanian as jilav) meaning "humid place".

In this commune there is an operating prison and also the Fort 13 Jilava.

== Fort 13 Jilava ==
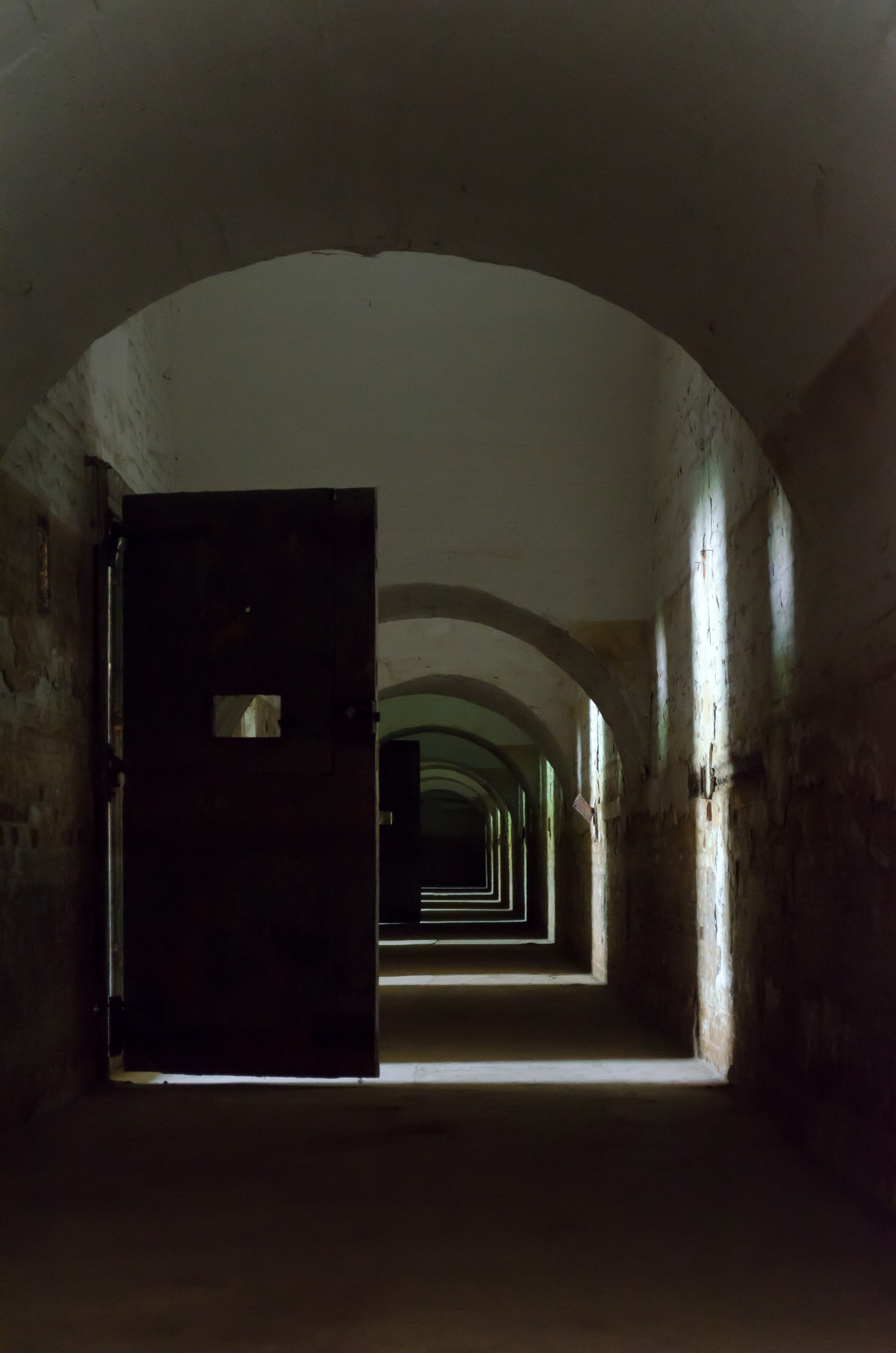
Cells at Fort 13 Jilava

Jilava was the location of a fort built by King Carol I of Romania, as part of the capital's defense system. At a later date, the fort was converted into a prison. Jilava Prison is now a historical monument.

This prison is the site where, on November 26–27, 1940, the Iron Guard authorities of the National Legionary State killed 64 political prisoners as revenge for the previous killing of their leader Corneliu Zelea Codreanu (see Jilava Massacre); it was also here that Ion Antonescu, dictator (Conducător) of Romania during World War II, was executed for war crimes in 1946 and where on 23 October 1971 the serial killer, Ion Rîmaru was executed by firing squad.

The prison also was a detention site for political prisoners after the start of Communist rule in Romania. According to a study done by the International Centre for Studies into Communism, 36.1% of all such prisoners did some time at Jilava Prison.

Historical population
Year	Pop.	±%
2002	11,919	—
2011	12,223	+2.6%
2021	10,611	−13.2%
Source: Census data

== Natives ==
- Dem I. Dobrescu (1869–1948), politician who served as Mayor of Bucharest from 1929 to 1934
- Nicolae Țapu (1907–1974), racing cyclist
