= Jure Pavlič =

Yugoslav cyclist

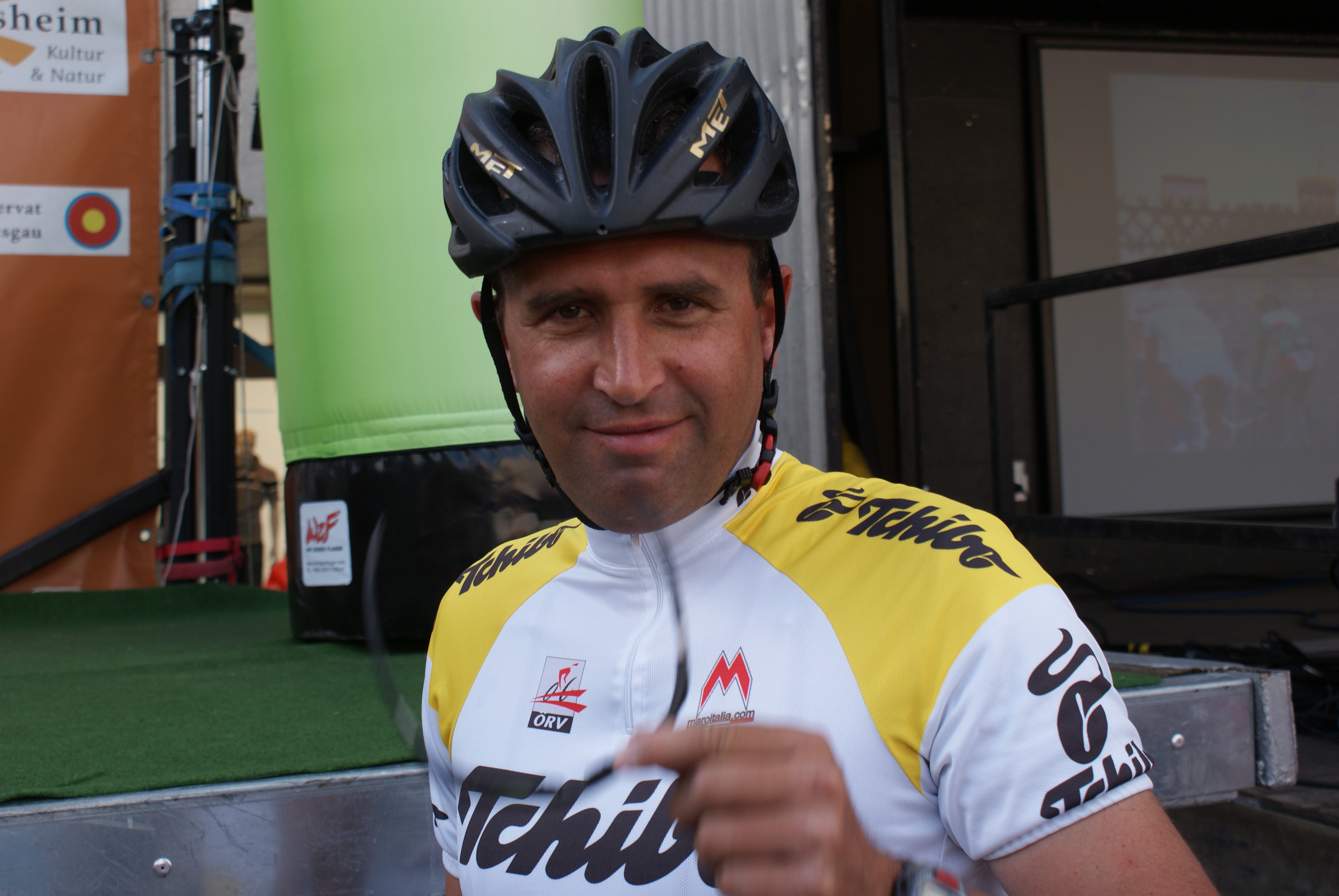

Personal information
- Born: 23 April 1963 (age 63) Ljubljana, SR Slovenia, SFR Yugoslavia

Cycling career
- Sport: Cycling
- Discipline: Road
- Role: Rider

Professional team
- 1989–1991: Carrera Jeans–Vagabond

Jure Pavlič (born 23 April 1963) is a Yugoslav former cyclist. He competed in the individual road race event at the 1984 Summer Olympics. He also finished in 5th place in the Young Rider Classification, in a tie for 3rd place in the King of the Mountains competition and won the Intergiro competition ahead of Laurent Fignon during the 1989 Giro d'Italia.

== Major results ==
1984
3rd Overall Tour of Yugoslavia
1985
1st Overall Tour of Yugoslavia
1st Stage 1 Tour of Austria
1986
1st Overall Tour of Yugoslavia
2nd Giro del Belvedere
1988
1st Gran Premio Palio del Recioto
1st Stage 2 Tour of Austria
1989
1st Intergiro classification Giro d'Italia
