= Kyrylo Pospyeyev =

Ukrainian cyclist

Personal information
- Born: 30 December 1975 (age 50) Tambov, Russian SFSR, Soviet Union

Cycling career
- Sport: Cycling
- Current team: Retired
- Discipline: Road
- Role: Rider

Amateur team
- 2000: Cantina Tollo–Regain (stagiaire)

Professional teams
- 2001–2002: Cantina Tollo–Acqua & Sapone
- 2003: Domina Vacanze–Elitron
- 2004–2005: Acqua & Sapone

Kyrylo Pospyeyev (born 30 December 1975 in Tambov) is a Ukrainian former professional cyclist.

== Palmares ==
1998
3rd Overall Tour of Yugoslavia
2001
1st National Road Race Championships
2002
7th Overall Ster Elektrotoer

1st Mountains Classification

9th GP du canton d'Argovie
2004
2nd Giro dell'Etna
6th Overall Settimana Internazionale Coppi e Bartali
7th Overall Circuit de la Sarthe

Grand Tour general classification results timeline

Grand Tour	2001	2002	2003	2004
Giro	–	–	–	42
Tour	–	–	–	–
Vuelta	WD	–	37	–

WD = Withdrew
