= Karel Lavrih =

Yugoslav cyclist

Personal information
- Born: 1915 Ljubljana, Austria-Hungary
- Died: 1998 (aged 82–83) Ljubljana, Slovenia

Cycling career
- Sport: Cycling

Karel Lavrih (1915-1998) was a Yugoslav cyclist, who rode for Hermes Ljubljana and later Fortuna Belgrade. He was third on Yugoslav National Road Race Championships in 1938 and on Tour of Serbia in 1939.
