= Villa Forni Cerato =

Coordinates: 45°39′32″N 11°33′44″E

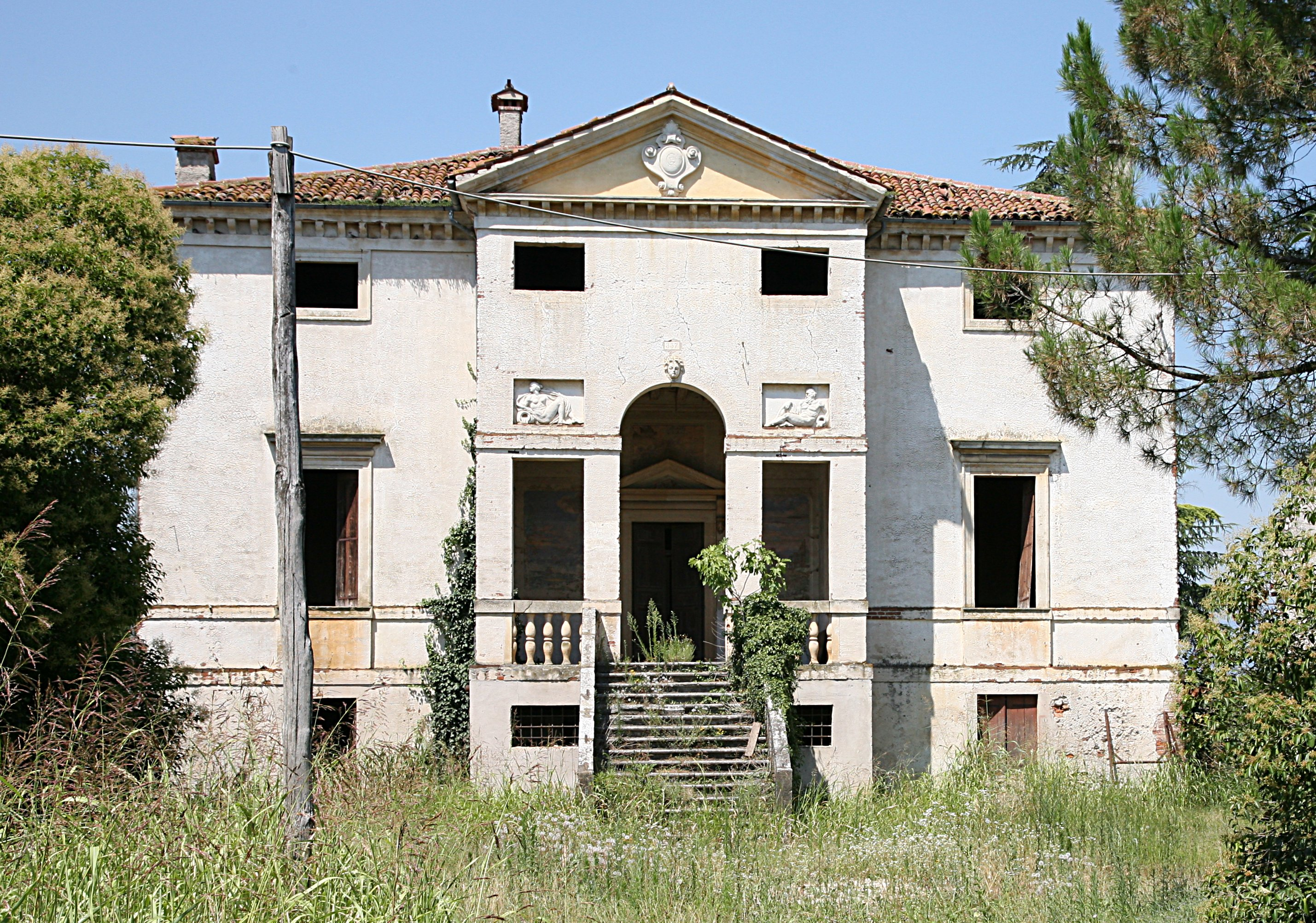
- Front facade of villa
- Interactive map of the Villa Forni Cerato area

General information
- Architectural style: Palladian
- Location: Italy
- Client: Girolamo Forni

The Villa Forni Cerato is a 16th-century villa in Montecchio Precalcino, Province of Vicenza, northern Italy. Its design is attributed to Andrea Palladio and his client is assumed to have been Girolamo Forni, a wealthy wood merchant who supplied building material for a number of the Palladio's projects. The attribution to Palladio is partly based on stylistic grounds, although the building departs from the Palladian norms.

== History ==
The villa was probably built in the 1540s modifying an existing building on the site. The double name Forni-Cerato, which it is always given, dates back to 1610. In that year the building, which belonged to Girolamo Forni who can be regarded as having commissioned it, passed in accordance with a provision in his will into the ownership of Giuseppe, Girolamo and Baldissera Cerato. Both its attribution to Palladio and the assumption that Girolamo Forni had it built remain a matter of speculation. The first reference to the architect being Palladio is in the 18th century (when it was mentioned by the architects Francesco Muttoni and Ottavio Bertotti Scamozzi). However, modern research agrees almost unanimously with their opinion.

== Architecture ==
Villa Forni Cerato is relatively small in size.

The loggia stands out as the dominant part of the villa on the frontal facade. In a comparable manner to Villa Godi, a flight of steps reaches over the basement and leads up to the loggia, which opens in a serliana. This serliana takes up the entire width of the loggia. The central axis is clearer than at the Villa Godi, partly because of the fenestration. But it is not only in this respect that the Villa Forni Cerato marks a step forward in Palladio's development; for the first time the borders between the various storeys of the facade are clearly visible. Height is structured by the triple rhythm of the cellar storey, piano nobile and mezzanine storey.

Although the front serliana appears in a simplified form, a ledge projects from the foundations of the wall at the side of the round arch which leads around the loggia and meets its counterpart, where motifs are concerned, in the upper ends of the windows. A double ledge runs below the windows and connects the loggia organically with the rest of the building. Apart from its structural function, it forms both the upper and lower conclusions of two balusters, which are positioned among the outer pilasters of the serliana. If one also takes into consideration the fact that the balusters visually balance out the outer pilasters of the serliana, then the Villa Forni Cerato appears as a building in which the subordination of individual facade details with regard to the entire facade, which was characteristic of Palladio's later development, is expressed for the first time.

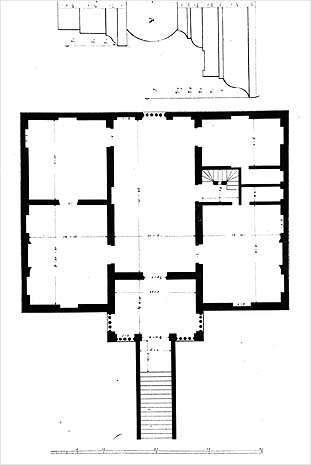
Floor plan (drawing by Ottavio Bertotti Scamozzi, 1778)

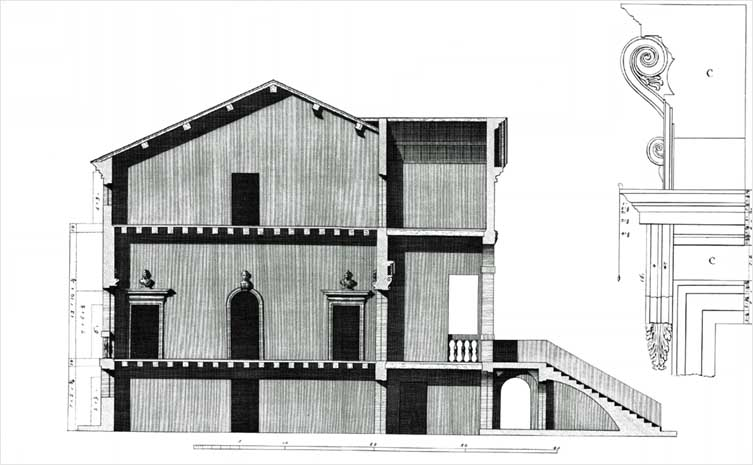
Cross section (drawing by Ottavio Bertotti Scamozzi, 1778)

== State of conservation ==
The body of the building has not undergone any significant changes with the exception of the back, which had a serliana, which was replaced by a balcony. The outline of the rear serliana is still visible.

Reliefs on the facade, which were removed in 1924, are recorded by a copperplate engraving by Marco Moro, but are not believed to be original features. The current reliefs, which show river gods, are 20th-century copies based on Moro's engraving. The same is true of the coat of arms within the gable area. Today, the only authentic sculptural decoration appears to be a mask over the round arch of the entrance serliana which is attributed to Alessandro Vittoria.

In 1996, UNESCO included the building in the World Heritage Site "City of Vicenza and the Palladian Villas of the Veneto". The villa is in a poor state of conservation.

== See also ==
- Palladian Villas of the Veneto
- Palladian architecture
