= Janez Peternel =

Personal information
- Born: 26 December 1913 Delnice, Slovenia near Škofja Loka, Austria-Hungary
- Died: 30 November 1943 (aged 29) Zagradec pri Grosupljem, Slovenia

Cycling career
- Sport: Cycling

Janez Peternel (26 December 1913 – 30 November 1943) was a Yugoslav cyclist, who rode for Hermes Ljubljana. He won Tour of Serbia in 1940. He died as a Partisan in World War II.
