= Venetian window =

Tripartite window

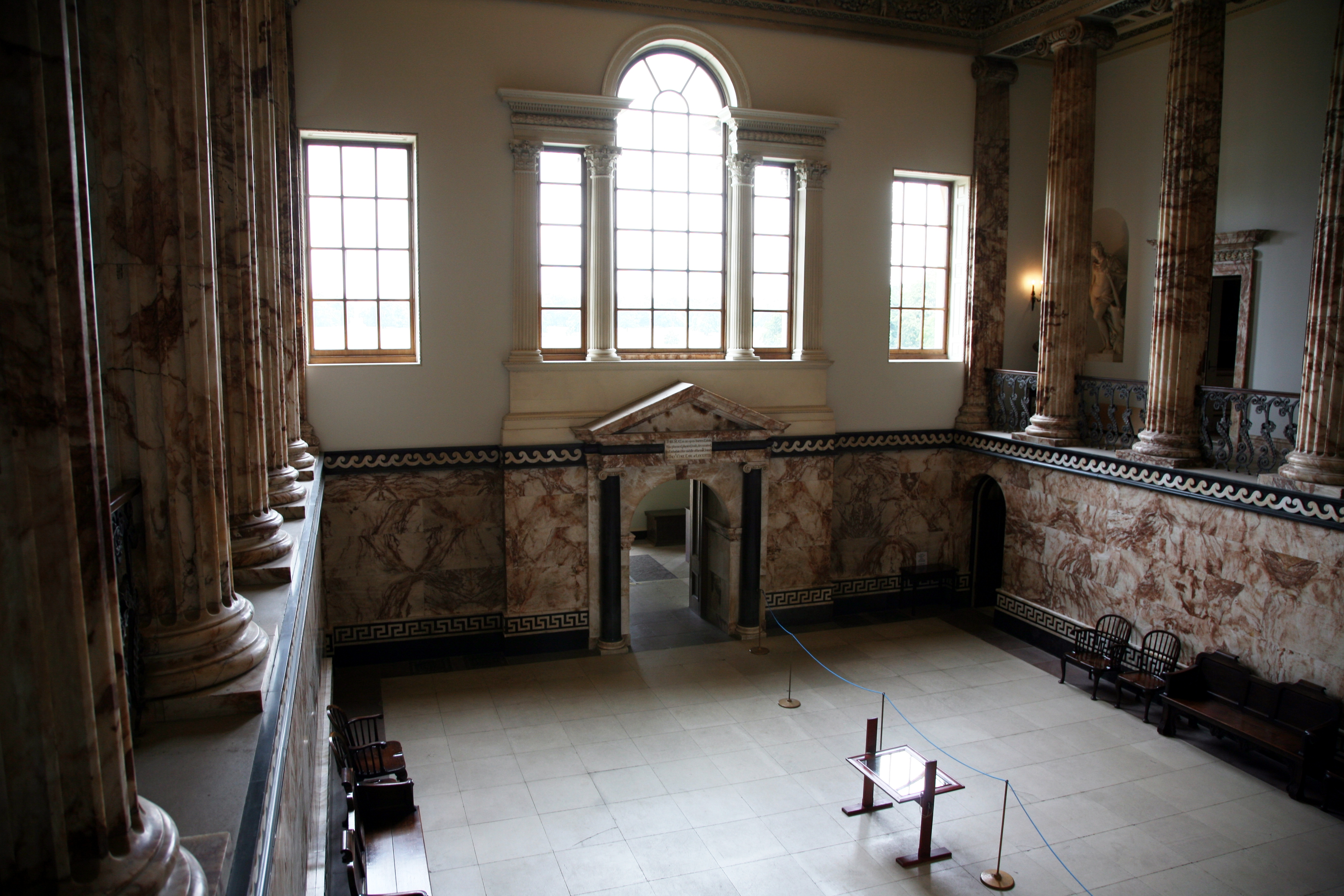
Venetian window at Holkham Hall in Norfolk, England, c. 1734-64

A Venetian window (also known as a Serlian window) is a large tripartite window which is a key element in Palladian architecture. Though it is associated with Sebastiano Serlio (1475–1554), he did not invent it. The window features largely in the work of the Italian architect Andrea Palladio (1508–1580) and is almost a trademark of his early career. The true Palladian window is an elaborated version. Both the Venetian window or Serlian window and the Palladian window were inspired by Hellenistic and Roman examples which are part of the classical tradition and related to prestige and sacredness.

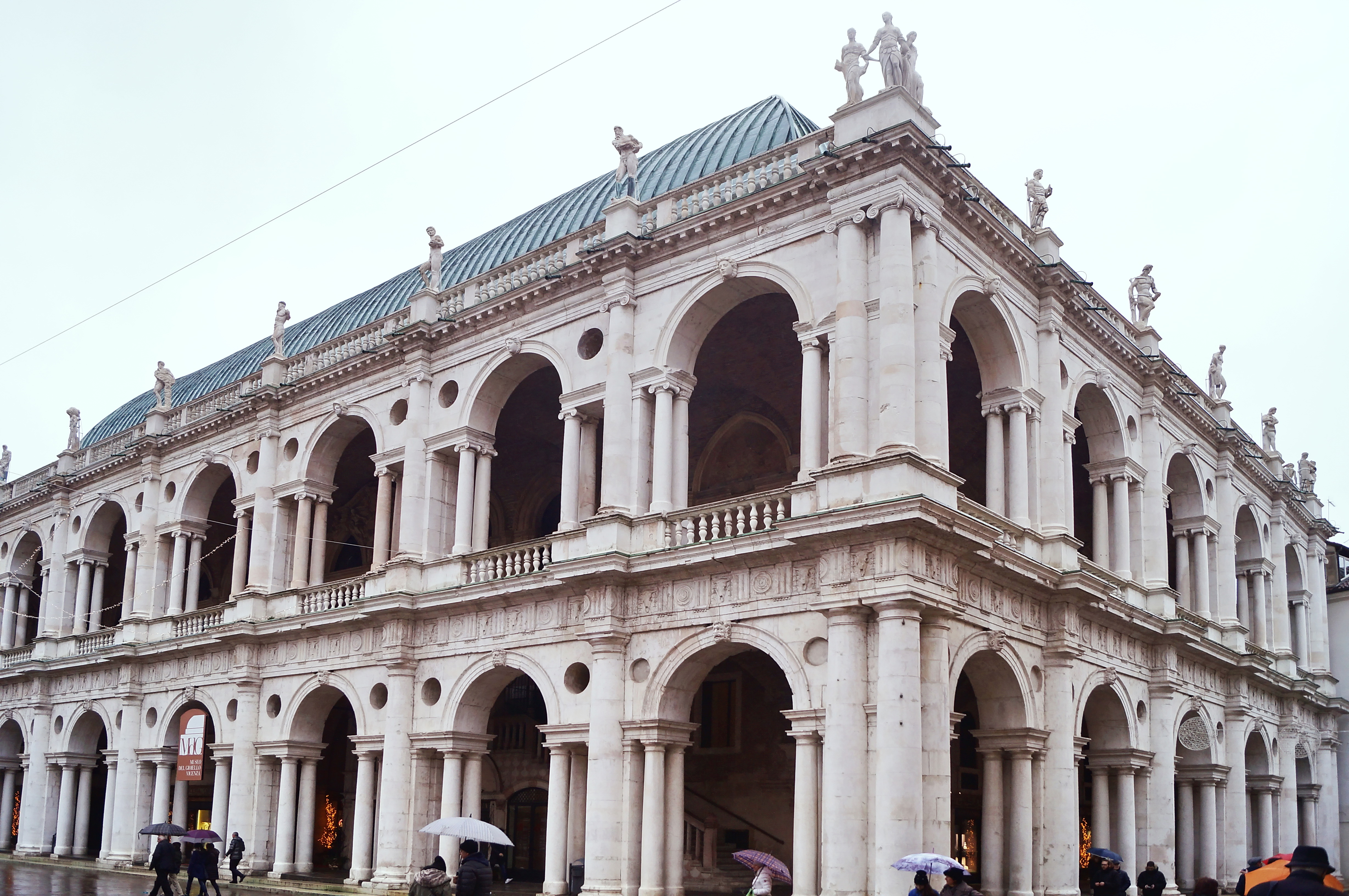
A corner of the Basilica Palladiana, Vicenza, with Palladian window openings to the loggia

== Overview ==
The Venetian window consists of an arched central light, symmetrically flanked by two shorter sidelights. Each sidelight is flanked by two columns or pilasters and topped by a small entablature. The entablatures serve as imposts supporting the semicircular arch that tops the central light. In the library at Venice, Sansovino varied the design by substituting columns for the two inner pilasters. To describe its origin as being either Palladian or Venetian is not accurate; the motif was first used by Donato Bramante and later mentioned by Serlio in his seven-volume architectural book Tutte l'opere d'architettura et prospetiva expounding the ideals of Vitruvius and Roman architecture, this arched window is flanked by two lower rectangular openings, a motif that first appeared in the triumphal arches of ancient Rome.

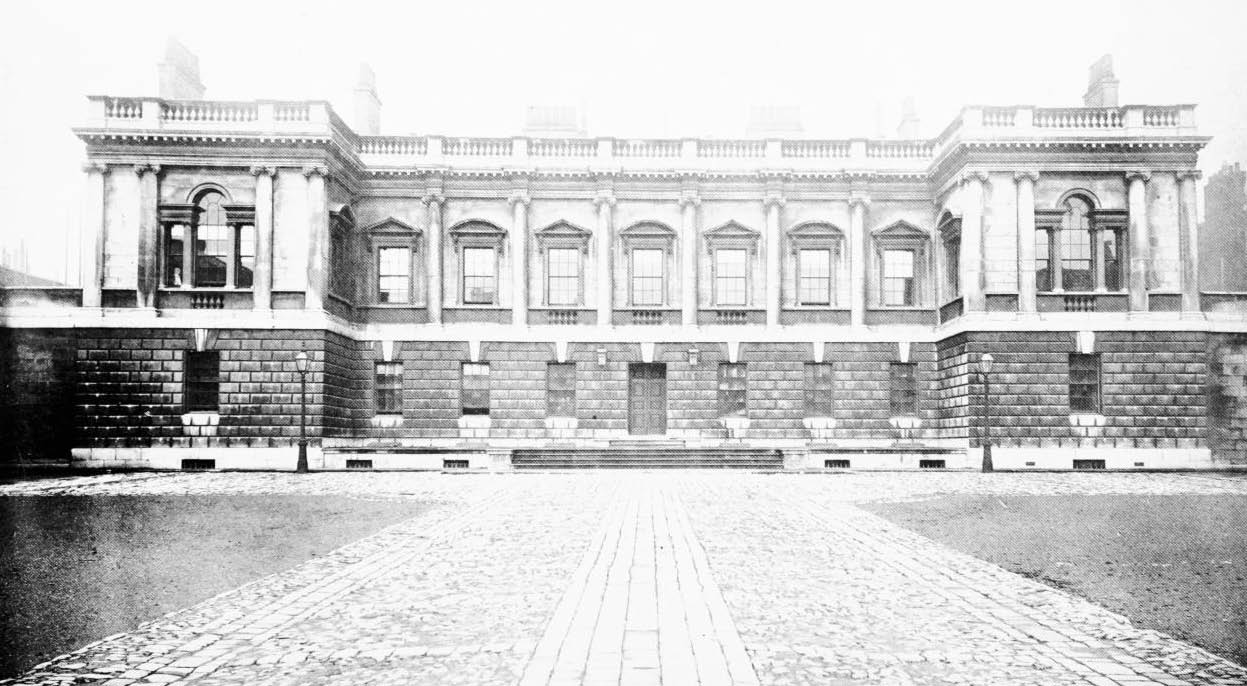
Pair of Palladian windows on wings of south front of Burlington House, Westminster, the earliest appearance of the element in Britain

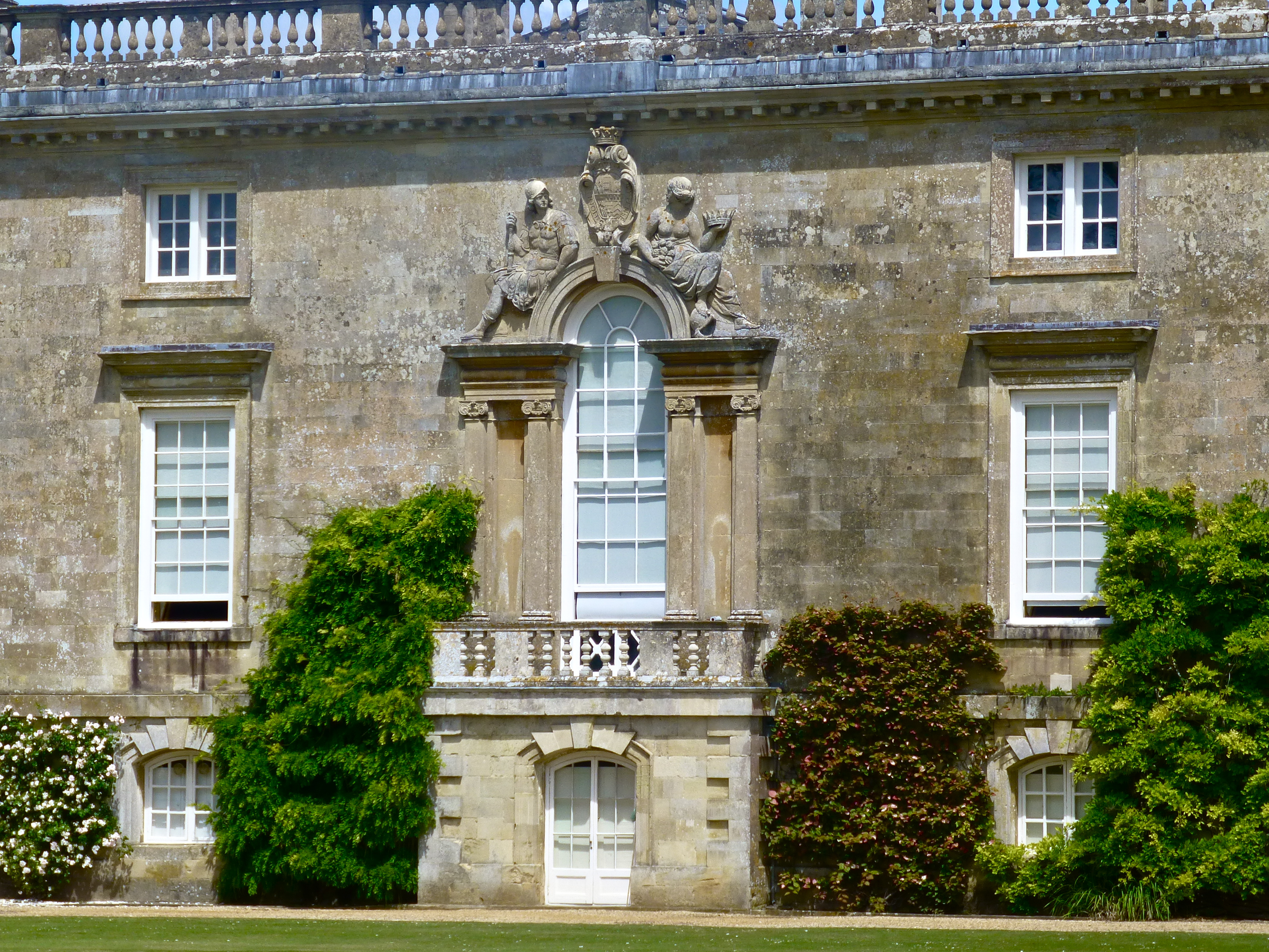
A Venetian window, with blind sides, designed by Isaac de Caus (d.1648) circa 1647, south front of Wilton House, Wiltshire, England

Palladio used the motif extensively, most notably in the arcades of the Basilica Palladiana in Vicenza. It is also a feature of his entrance to Villa Forni Cerato. It is perhaps this extensive use of the motif in the Veneto that has given the window its alternative name of the Venetian window; it is also known as a Serlian window. Whatever the name or the origin, this form of window has probably become one of the most enduring features of Palladio's work seen in the later architectural styles evolved from Palladianism. According to James Lees-Milne, its first appearance in Britain was in the remodeled wings of Burlington House, London, where the immediate source was actually in Inigo Jones's designs for Whitehall Palace rather than drawn from Palladio himself.

== Palladian window ==
The Palladian window or "Palladio motif" is Palladio's elaboration of this, normally used in a series. It places a larger or giant order in between each window, and doubles the small columns supporting the side lintels, placing the second column behind rather than beside the first. This is introduced in the Basilica Palladiana in Vicenza, where it is used on both storeys; this feature was less often copied. Here the openings are not strictly windows, as they enclose a loggia. Pilasters might replace columns, as in other contexts. Sir John Summerson suggests that the omission of the doubled columns may be allowed, but "the term "Palladian motif" should be confined" to cases where the larger order is present.

== Variants ==
A variant, in which the motif is enclosed within a relieving blind arch that unifies the motif, is not Palladian, though Burlington seems to have assumed it was so, in using a drawing in his possession showing three such features in a plain wall (see illustration of Claydon House right). Modern scholarship attributes the drawing to Scamozzi. Burlington employed the motif in 1721 for an elevation of Tottenham Park in Savernake Forest for his brother-in-law Lord Bruce (since remodelled). Kent picked it up in his designs for the Houses of Parliament, and it appears in Kent's executed designs for the north front of Holkham Hall.

The Ipswich window is another variant.

== Gallery ==
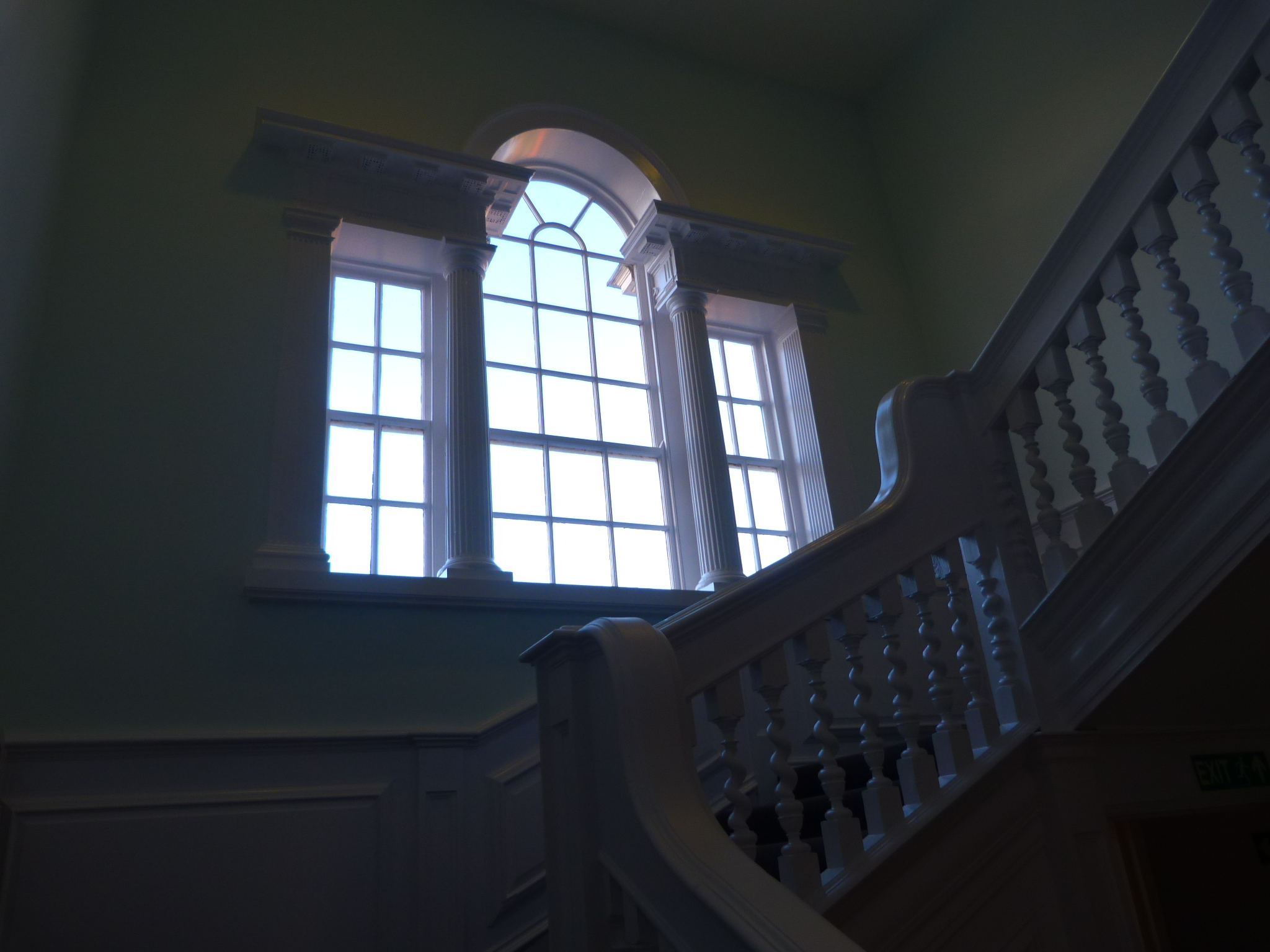
Venetian window in the Manor House, Sedgefield

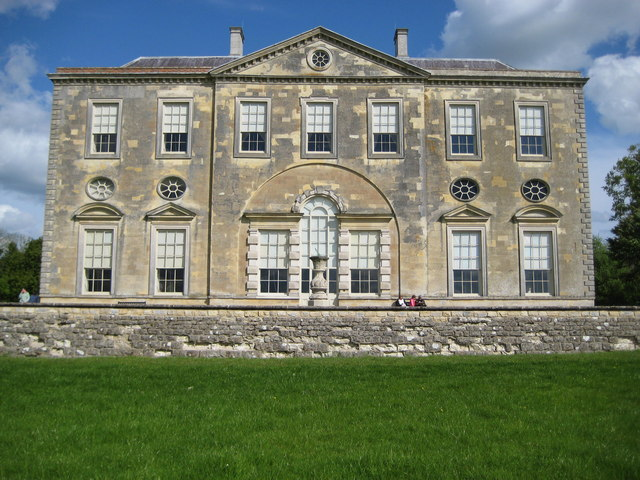
Claydon House (begun 1757), here the Venetian window in the central bay is surrounded by a unifying blind arch
