= Sante Carollo =

Italian cyclist

Personal information
- Born: 8 February 1924 Montecchio Precalcino, Veneto, Italy
- Died: 9 January 2004 (aged 79) Thiene, Veneto, Italy

Cycling career
- Sport: Cycling
- Discipline: Road
- Role: Rider

Professional teams
- 1949: Wilier Triestina
- 1950-1951: Individual

Major wins
- Grand Tours Giro d'Italia Maglia Nera classification (1949)

Sante Carollo (Montecchio Precalcino, 8 February 1924 – Thiene, 9 January 2004) was an Italian road cyclist.

His main occupation being a bricklayer, he became famous to the public for being the Maglia nera at the 1949 Giro d'Italia. He formed a rivalry with Luigi Malabrocca for the Maglia nera at the Giro d'Italia. He 'lost' the rivalry, earning the jersey once compared to Malabrocca's twice.
