= Giuseppe Ticozzelli =

Italian footballer (1894–1962)

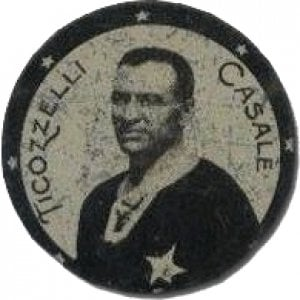
- Ticozzelli in 1926

Personal information
- Full name: Giuseppe Ticozzelli
- Date of birth: 30 April 1894
- Place of birth: Castelnovetto, Italy
- Date of death: 3 February 1962 (aged 67)
- Place of death: Milan, Italy
- Position: Defender

Senior career*
Years	Team	Apps	(Gls)
1914–1921	Alessandria	35	(3)
1921–1924	SPAL	62	(6)
1924–1931	Casale	77	(4)

International career
1920	Italy	1	(0)
- * Club domestic league appearances and goals

Giuseppe Ticozzelli (Italian pronunciation: [dʒuˈzɛppe tikotˈtsɛlli]; 30 April 1894 – 3 February 1962) was an Italian footballer who played as a defender. On 18 January 1920, he represented the Italy national football team on the occasion of a friendly match against France in a 9–4 home win.

A cycling enthusiast, Ticozzelli decided to participate to the 1926 Giro d'Italia as an independent, wearing a black jersey. He completed three stages, but since he ran alone without soigneurs, he had to stop at taverns in order to eat, with considerable loss of time. He retired during the fourth stage after being hit by a vehicle. Remembering his unorthodox participation, in the 1946 Giro d'Italia it was introduced the maglia nera (black jersey), awarded to the last cyclist to finish the race.

Later, he left for Italian East Africa as a military volunteer, and lost his eyesight fighting against Abyssinian guerrillas.
