= Čubrilo =

Čubrilo (Serbian Cyrillic: Чубрило) is a Serbian surname, derived from the Serbian adjective čubar ("savory"). It is the basis of the patronymic Čubrilović. It may refer to:

- Milica Čubrilo, former Serbian Minister for Diaspora
- Jelena Čubrilo (born 1994), Serbian women footballer
- Nemanja Čubrilo, Serbian volleyball player
- Aleksandar Čubrilo (born 1975), former Serbian basketball player

== See also ==
- Čubrić, surname
