= Nentcho Christov =

Bulgarian cyclist (1933–2002)

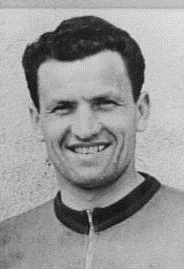
- Christov in 1961

Personal information
- Born: 17 December 1933 Varna, Bulgaria
- Died: May 3, 2002

Cycling career
- Sport: Cycling
- Discipline: Road
- Role: Rider

Amateur team
- 1955–1961: Bulgaria national team

Major wins
- Peace Race (1961); Tour of Yugoslavia (1959)

Nentcho Christov (Bulgarian: Ненчо Христов; 17 December 1933 – 3 May 2002) was a Bulgarian cyclist.

== Palmares ==
1955
2nd Overall Tour of Bulgaria

1st Stages 4 & 7

1956
1st Overall Tour d'Egypte
1957
1st Overall Peace Race

1st Stage 3

1st Overall Tour of Bulgaria

1st 4 stages

1958
1st 2 stages Tour of Bulgaria
1959
1st Overall Tour of Yugoslavia

1st Stage 8

6th Overall Peace Race
1962
3rd Overall Tour of Bulgaria
