= Franz Dunder =

Austrian cyclist

Personal information
- Born: 6 September 1913
- Died: 23 June 1970 (aged 56)

Cycling career
- Sport: Cycling
- Discipline: Road
- Role: Rider

Franz Dunder (6 September 1913 – 23 June 1970) was an Austrian racing cyclist. He rode in the 1936 Tour de France.
