= Cvitko Bilić =

Croatian road racing cyclist (born 1943)

Personal information
- Born: 19 October 1943 (age 82) Loborika near Pula, Kingdom of Italy
- Height: 1.83 m (6 ft 0 in)
- Weight: 76 kg (168 lb)

Cycling career
- Sport: Cycling
- Discipline: Road

Major wins
- 3 × Istrian Spring Trophy (1967, 1968, 1970); 2 × Tour de Serbie (1971, 1973); 2 × Tour of Yugoslavia (1965, 1971)

Cvitko Bilić (born 19 October 1943) is a former Croatian road bicycle racer active in the 1960s and 1970s who competed for Yugoslavia at the 1968 and 1972 Summer Olympics.

Bilić was voted Croatian Sportsman of the Year in 1966 by the Croatian sports daily Sportske novosti.

== Olympic results ==
Event	1968	1972
Individual road race	25th	—
Team time trial	16th	21st
