= Veselin Petrović (cyclist) =

Serbian cyclist

Personal information
- Full name: Veselin Petrović
- Born: 6 September 1929 Vlasenica, Kingdom of Serbs, Croats, and Slovenes
- Died: 8 November 1995 (aged 66)

Cycling career
- Sport: Cycling
- Discipline: Road
- Role: Rider, administrator

Veselin Petrović (6 September 1929 – 8 November 1995) was a Serbian and Yugoslav cyclist. He competed in the 1956 Summer Olympics in Australia, and the 1960 Summer Olympics in Italy.

== Career ==
Veselin Petrović-Vesa was a Serbian, born 6 September 1929 in Vlasenica, Kingdom of Yugoslavia (today Bosnia and Herzegovina). He moved to the capital city of Belgrade, Serbia during World War II and started practicing cycling in his early teens. For 11 consecutive years he represented Yugoslavia at international cycling competitions. He was 6 times Yugoslav National Cycling Champion. In his career, he won over 100 races and represented his country in 82 international competitions.

Petrović was the winner at the 1951 Tour de Macedonia and 1954 Tour de Yugoslavia. He was twice a Champion of Yugoslavia in road bicycle racing. He rode the road race in 1956 at the Melbourne Olympics and finished 26th and in 1960, at Rome Olympics Men's 100 kilometres Team, and finished 15th. He also rode Tour d'Algerie, Tour d'Egypt, Tour de Luxembourg, Course de la Paix (Warsaw-Berlin-Prague) also known as the 'Tour de France of the East' during the Cold War, and many more.

Petrović graduated with associate degree in Physical Education Teaching and Coaching from Faculty of Sports and Physical Education in Belgrade.

After he retired as a racer Veselin Petrović started a successful career as a directeur sportif (sporting director) of Tour de Yugoslavie and Tour de Serbie. He also served as the Director of Yugoslav Cycling Selection Committee, President of the Serbian Cycling Association, UCI Official Representative for Yugoslavia and President of the Partizan Cycling Club in Belgrade.

== Summer Olympic Games ==
1956 Summer Olympics Melbourne/Cycling Men's Road Race, Individual, Finished 26th

1960 Summer Olympics Rome/Cycling Men's 100 kilometres Team, Finished 15th

== See also ==
- Cycling at the 1956 Summer Olympics - Men's individual road race
