= Franc Abulnar =

Yugoslav cyclist (1909–1995)

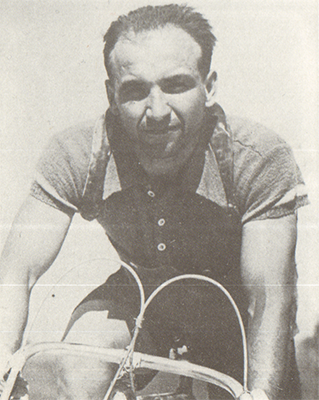

Personal information
- Born: 11 July 1909 Ljubljana, Austria-Hungary
- Died: 18 November 1995 Winnipeg, Canada

Cycling career
- Sport: Cycling

Franc Abulnar (11 July 1909 – 18 November 1995) was a Yugoslav cyclist. He rode for Hermes Ljubljana. as the first Slovenian he competed at 1936 Tour de France and was second on Yugoslav National Road Race Championships in 1938.
