= Delnice, Gorenja Vas–Poljane =

Delnice
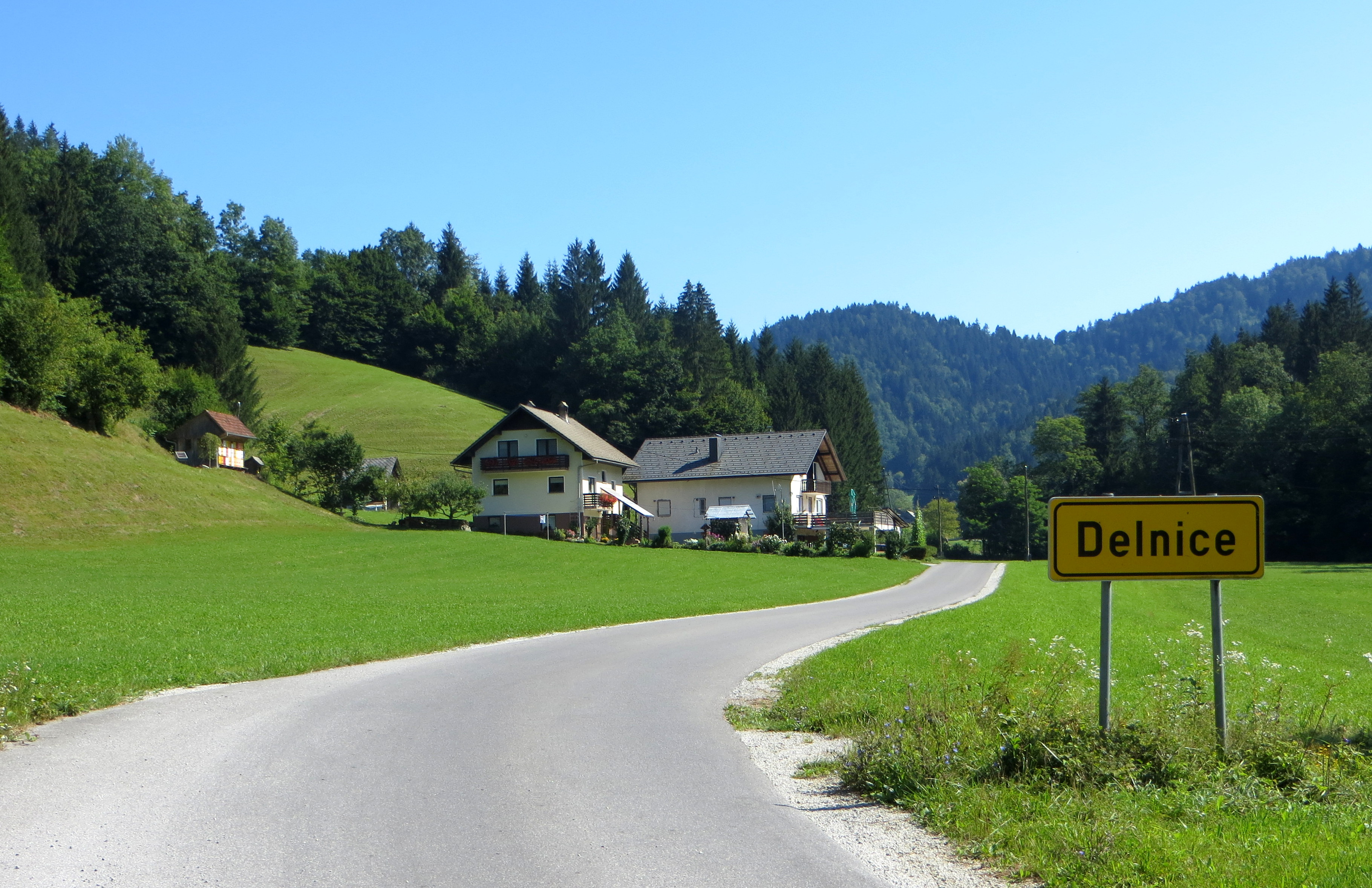

- Location in Slovenia
- Coordinates: 46°9′14.38″N 14°11′37.7″E
- Country: Slovenia
- Traditional region: Upper Carniola
- Statistical region: Upper Carniola
- Municipality: Gorenja Vas–Poljane

Area
  - Total: 2.06 km^{2} (0.80 sq mi)
- Elevation: 464.7 m (1,525 ft)

Population (2020)
  - Total: 151
  - Density: 73.3/km^{2} (190/sq mi)

Delnice (pronounced [ˈdeːu̯nitsɛ]; German: Dewenze) is a small dispersed settlement in the hills north of Poljane nad Škofjo Loko in the Municipality of Gorenja Vas–Poljane in the Upper Carniola region of Slovenia.
