= Nikolai Matvejev =

Soviet cyclist

Personal information
- Born: 11 December 1923 Tallinn, Estonia
- Died: 5 April 1984 (aged 60) Tallinn, then part of Estonian SSR, Soviet Union

Cycling career
- Sport: Cycling

Nikolai Matvejev (11 December 1923 – 5 April 1984) was a Soviet cyclist. He competed in the 4,000 metres team pursuit event at the 1952 Summer Olympics. He won the Soviet Union National Road Race Championships in 1951.
