= Alfred Weck =

French cyclist

Personal information
- Born: 5 March 1915
- Died: 9 July 1971 (aged 56)

Cycling career
- Sport: Cycling
- Discipline: Road
- Role: Rider

Alfred Weck (5 March 1915 – 9 July 1971) was a French racing cyclist. He rode in the 1936 Tour de France.
