= Janez Žirovnik =

Yugoslav cyclist

Personal information
- Born: 30 July 1935 (age 91) Ljubljana, Kingdom of Yugoslavia

Cycling career
- Sport: Cycling

Janez Žirovnik (born 30 July 1935) is a former Yugoslav cyclist. He competed in the individual road race and team time trial events at the 1960 Summer Olympics.
