= Gainan Saidkhuzhin =

Soviet cyclist

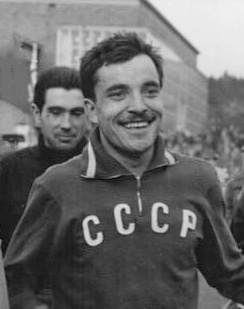
- Gainan Saidkhuzhin in 1960

Personal information
- Born: 30 June 1937 Novosibirsk, Russian SFSR, Soviet Union
- Died: 13 May 2015 (aged 77) Miami, Florida, U.S.
- Height: 1.71 m (5 ft 7 in)
- Weight: 69 kg (152 lb)

Cycling career
- Sport: Cycling
Medal record
World championships
Bronze medal – third place	1963 Rocourt	Team time trial

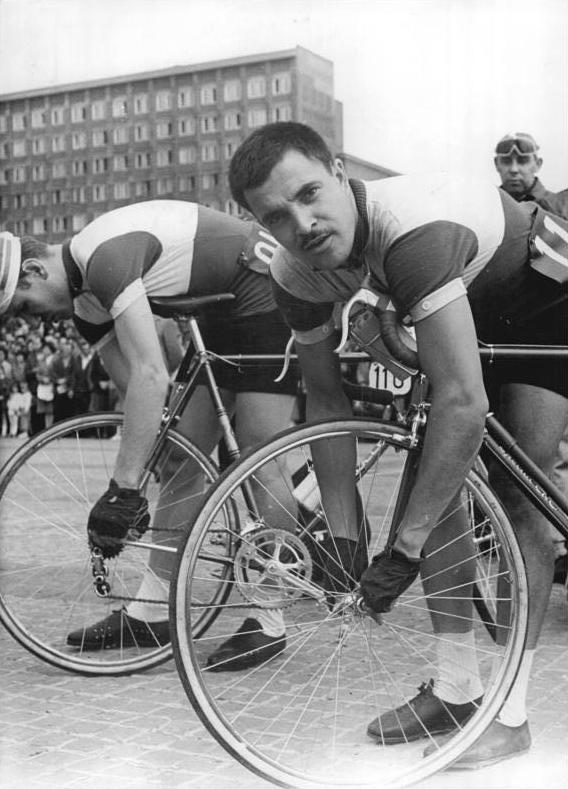
Saidkhuzhin at the 1961 Peace Race

Gainan Rakhmatovich Saidkhuzhin (Russian: Гайнан Рахматович Сайдхужин; 30 June 1937 – 13 May 2015) was a Russian Tatar cyclist and ten-time cycling champion of the Soviet Union. He competed in the road race at the 1960 and 1964 Summer Olympics and finished in 34th and 41st places, respectively. In 1964 he also finished fifth in the 100 km team time trial.

He took part in nine Peace Races and won five times in the team competition (1961, 1962, 1965–1967) and once individually (1962); he won individual stages in 1960, 1962 and 1965. In 1963 he finished third in the team time trial at the world championship. He also won Tour of Turkey in 1969.

He was born to Rakhmatulla Saidkhuzhin (1876–1968) and Bibisafa Saidkhuzhina (1905–1968) in a Tatar family living in Novosibirsk. He started training in cycling in 1954 and by 1957 won his first national title. The same year he became a member of the national team and soon its captain, a position he held for about 10 years. During his career he won 10 national titles. He combined sport with studies, graduating from Smolensk Institute of Physical Education in 1967 and from the economics faculty of the Moscow State University in 1973. After defending a PhD in pedagogy he worked for 15 years as the head of cycling section of the Institute of Physical Education in Moscow, eventually becoming the first professor in cycling at the Institute. In parallel, he worked as a coach and international referee. For his achievements he was awarded the Order of the Badge of Honour and Medal "For Labour Valour".

Saidkhuzhin had five elder siblings including a brother, Rafail, and two sisters, Magira and Sagida; Rafail and Sagida are also former competitive cyclists. He is married to Rozida. They have a daughter, Zukhra (born 1960), and a son Tagir (born 1967).

Saidkhuzhin died of a heart attack on 13 May 2015 at the age of 77 in Miami.
