= Albert Gijsen =

Dutch cyclist

Personal information
- Born: 16 August 1915
- Died: 24 February 2007 (aged 91)

Cycling career
- Sport: Cycling
- Discipline: Road
- Role: Rider

Albert Gijsen (16 August 1915 – 24 February 2007) was a Dutch racing cyclist. He rode in the 1936 Tour de France.
