= Franc Škerlj =

Yugoslav cyclist

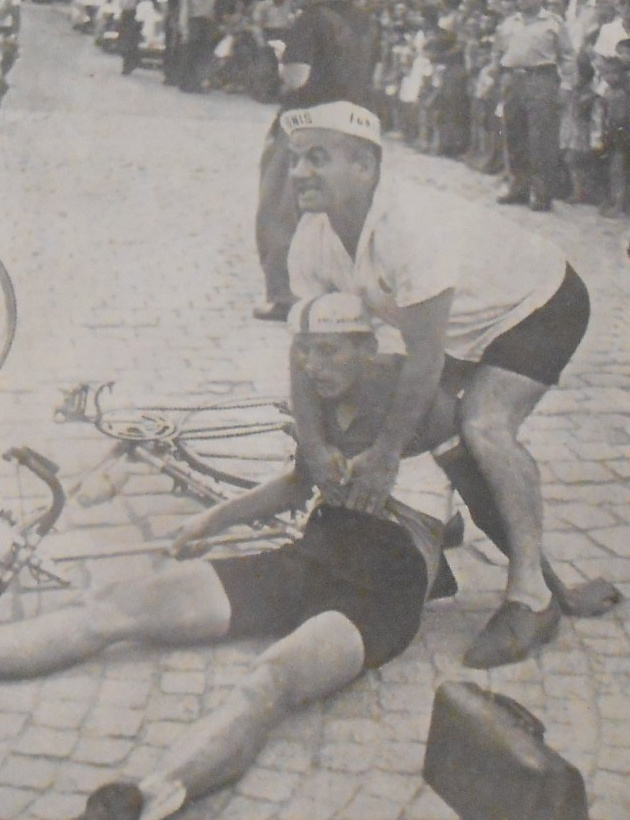
- Franc Škerlj, circa 1962

Personal information
- Born: 6 May 1941 Ljubljana, Kingdom of Italy
- Died: 3 May 2023 (aged 81)

Cycling career
- Sport: Cycling

Franc Škerlj (6 May 1941 – 3 May 2023) was a Yugoslav Slovenian cyclist. He competed in the team time trial at the 1968 Summer Olympics.
