= Virgil Marmocea =

Romanian cyclist

Personal information
- Born: 1909
- Died: 1998 (aged 88–89)

Cycling career
- Sport: Cycling
- Discipline: Road
- Role: Rider

Virgil Marmocea (1909 – 1998) was a Romanian racing cyclist. He rode in the 1936 Tour de France.
