= Léon Theerlynck =

Belgian cyclist

Personal information
- Born: 28 June 1913 Desselgem, Belgium
- Died: 31 December 1992 (aged 79) Menen, Belgium

Cycling career
- Sport: Cycling
- Discipline: Road
- Role: Rider

Léon Theerlynck (28 June 1913 – 31 December 1992) was a Belgian became French racing cyclist. He rode in the 1936 Tour de France.
