= Ivan Levačić =

Yugoslav cyclist (1931–2023)

Personal information
- Born: 25 August 1931 Virje, Kingdom of Yugoslavia
- Died: 7 July 2023 (aged 91)

Cycling career
- Sport: Cycling

Ivan Levačić (25 August 1931 – 7 July 2023) was a Yugoslav cyclist. He competed in the individual road race and team time trial events at the 1960 Summer Olympics. Levacic was born in Karlovac, his profession was a repairman.

Levačić died on 7 July 2023, at the age of 91.
