= Gheorghe Hapciuc =

Romanian cyclist

Personal information
- Born: 1910
- Died: 1972 (aged 61–62)

Cycling career
- Sport: Cycling
- Discipline: Road
- Role: Rider

Gheorghe Hapciuc (1910 – 1972) was a Romanian racing cyclist. He rode in the 1936 Tour de France.
