= Albert Oblinger =

Austrian cyclist

Personal information
- Born: 10 September 1910

Cycling career
- Sport: Cycling
- Discipline: Road
- Role: Rider

Albert Oblinger (born 10 September 1910, date of death unknown) was an Austrian racing cyclist. He rode in the 1936 Tour de France.
