= Tour de Serbie =

Serbian multi-day road cycling race

Race details
- Date: Varies
- Region: Serbia
- English name: Tour of Serbia
- Local name: Трка кроз Србију/Trka kroz Srbiju (Кроз Србију/Kroz Srbiju)
- Discipline: Road
- Competition: UCI Europe Tour
- Type: Stage race
- Race director: Vladimir Kuvalja
- Web site: www.tds.co.rs

History
- First edition: 1939
- Editions: 64 (as of 2025)
- First winner: August Prosenik (YUG)
- Most wins: Mikoš Rnjaković (YUG) (4 wins)
- Most recent: Lorenzo Cataldo (ITA)

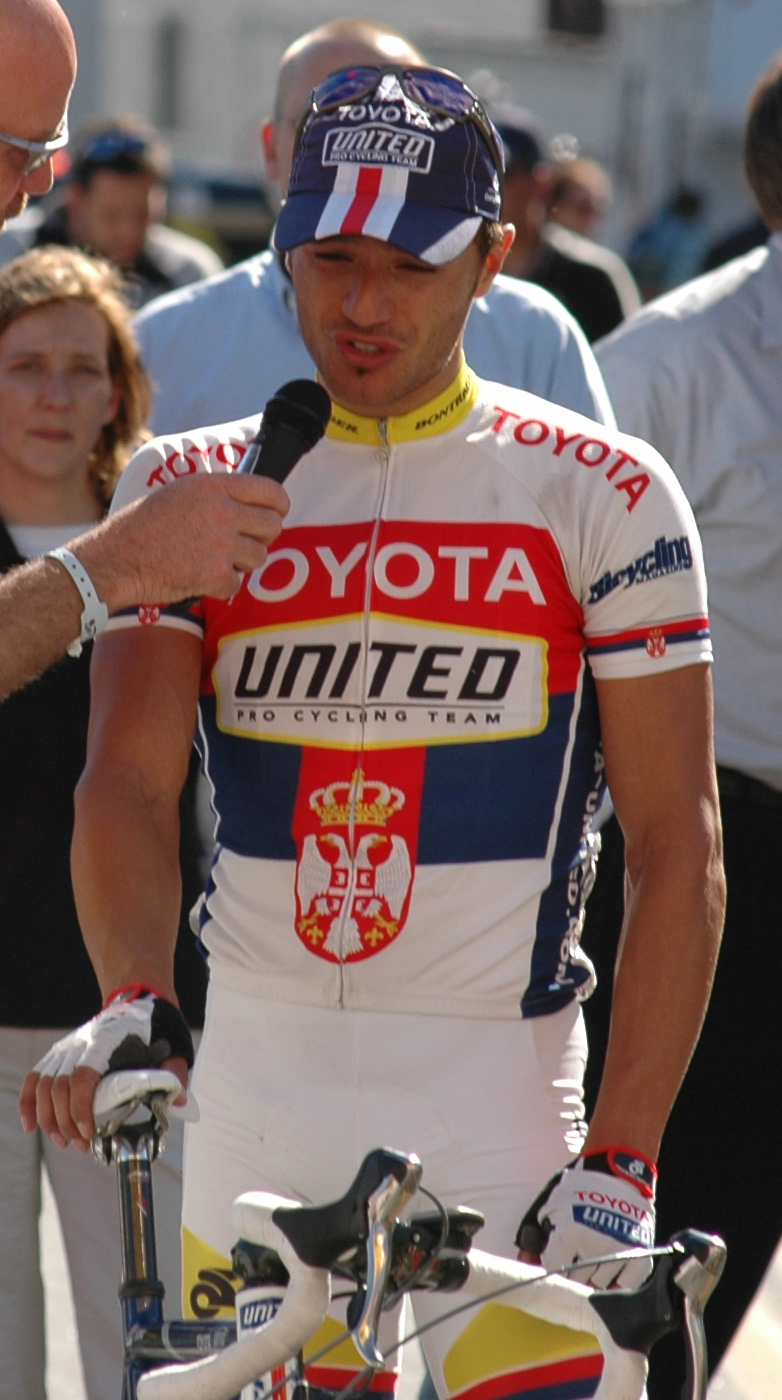
2013 winner Ivan Stević (pictured in 2007)

Tour de Serbie is a road bicycle race held annually in Serbia. First held in 1939, since 2005 it has been ranked 2.2 on the UCI Europe Tour.

== Past winners ==
Year	Country	Rider	Team
1939	Yugoslavia	August Prosenik	
1940	Yugoslavia	Janez Peternel	
1941– 1962	No race		
1963	Czechoslovakia	Karel Vávra	
1964	Yugoslavia	Jože Valenčič	
1965	Yugoslavia	Radoš Čubrić	
1966	Yugoslavia	Andrej Boltezar	
1967	Poland	Ryszard Zapała	
1968	Czechoslovakia	Jan Vávra	
1969	Czechoslovakia	Břetislav Souček	
1970	Yugoslavia	Radoš Čubrić	
1971	Yugoslavia	Cvitko Bilić	
1972	Czechoslovakia	Petar Hladik	
1973	Yugoslavia	Cvitko Bilić	
1974	Yugoslavia	Jože Valenčič	
1975	Czechoslovakia	Jiří Bartolšik	
1976	Yugoslavia	Jože Valenčič	
1977	Yugoslavia	Drago Frelih	
1978	Yugoslavia	Drago Frelih	
1979	Czechoslovakia	František Kundert	
1980	Yugoslavia	Drago Frelih	
1981	Yugoslavia	Bojan Ropret	
1982	Yugoslavia	Dragić Borovičanin	
1983	Yugoslavia	Mladen Lojen	
1984	Yugoslavia	Gorazd Penko	
1985	Yugoslavia	Mikoš Rnjaković	
1986	Yugoslavia	Janiz Lampic	
1987	Yugoslavia	Rajko Čubrić	
1988	Yugoslavia	Rajko Čubrić	
1989	Yugoslavia	Robert Šebenik	
1990	Yugoslavia	Mikoš Rnjaković	
1991	Yugoslavia	Mikoš Rnjaković	
1992	FR Yugoslavia	Zoran Ilić	
1993	Russia	Andrei Kokorine	
1994	Russia	Alexei Sivakov	
1995	Ukraine	Oleksandr Fedenko	
1996	FR Yugoslavia	Mikoš Rnjaković	
1997	FR Yugoslavia	Saša Gajičić	
1998	Slovenia	Robert Pintarić	
1999	Finland	Kjell Carlström	
2000	FR Yugoslavia	Aleksandar Nikačević	
2001	FR Yugoslavia	Saša Gajičić	
2002	FR Yugoslavia	Aleksandar Nikačević	Alessio
2003	Poland	Jacek Walczak	Legia–Bazyliszek
2004	Japan	Koji Fukushima	Bridgestone–Anchor
2005	Croatia	Matija Kvasina	Perutnina Ptuj
2006	Bulgaria	Ivailo Gabrovski	Flanders
2007	Slovenia	Matej Stare	Perutnina Ptuj
2008	Croatia	Matija Kvasina	Perutnina Ptuj
2009	Italy	Davide Torosantucci	Centri della Calzatura
2010	Italy	Luca Ascani	CDC–Cavaliere
2011	Serbia	Ivan Stević	Partizan Powermove
2012	Germany	Stefan Schumacher	Christina Watches–Onfone
2013	Serbia	Ivan Stević	Tuşnad Cycling Team
2014	Poland	Jarosław Kowalczyk	BDC Marcpol
2015	Russia	Ivan Savitskiy	Russia (national team)
2016	Slovenia	Matej Mugerli	Synergy Baku
2017	Greece	Charalampos Kastrantas	Dare Viator Partizan
2018	Argentina	Nicolás Tivani	Trevigiani Phonix–Hemus 1896
2019	Italy	Enrico Salvador	Northwave Cofiloc
2020	Slovakia	Martin Haring	Dukla Banská Bystrica
2021	France	Jean Goubert	Sprinter Nice Métropole
2022	Eritrea	Dawit Yemane	Bike Aid
2023	No race		
2024	Netherlands	Quinten Veling	Wielerploeg Groot Amsterdam
2025	Italy	Lorenzo Cataldo	Gragnano Sporting Club
