= Yuri Lavrushkin =

Russian road cyclist

Personal information
- Full name: Yuri Yakovlevich Lavrushkin
- Born: 4 November 1948 (age 77) Orsk, Chkalov Oblast, Soviet Union

Cycling career
- Sport: Cycling
- Current team: Retired
- Discipline: Road
- Role: Rider

Amateur team
- 1970–1977: Soviet Union National Team

Yuri Yakovlevich Lavrushkin (Russian: Юрий Яковлевич Лаврушкин, sometimes Romanized Lavyrushkin; born 4 November 1948) is a retired Russian road cyclist.

== Early life ==
Born near the Urals in the city of Orsk, Lavrushkin attended the Moscow Institute of Physical Culture.

== Career ==
Lavrushkin won the 1972 Tour of Yugoslavia.

He won the Rás Tailteann in 1977.
