= Fritz Funke =

German cyclist

Personal information
- Born: 24 December 1907
- Died: 9 May 1977 (aged 69)

Cycling career
- Sport: Cycling
- Discipline: Road
- Role: Rider

Fritz Funke (24 December 1907 – 9 May 1977) was a German racing cyclist. He rode in the 1936 Tour de France.
