= Đuro Dukanović =

Yugoslav cyclist

Personal information
- Born: 24 April 1902 Velika Ludina, Austria-Hungary
- Died: 1 April 1945 (aged 42) Zagreb, Croatia

Cycling career
- Sport: Cycling

Đuro Dukanović (22 April 1902 – 1 April 1945) was a Yugoslav cyclist. He competed in two events at the 1924 Summer Olympics.
