= Antun Banek =

Yugoslav cyclist (1901–1987)

Personal information
- Born: 27 April 1901 Križevci, Austria-Hungary
- Died: 18 March 1987 (aged 85) Zagreb, Yugoslavia

Cycling career
- Sport: Cycling

Antun Banek (27 April 1901 – 18 March 1987) was a Yugoslav cyclist. He competed in the individual and team road race events at the 1928 Summer Olympics.
