= Remy Royer =

French cyclist (1911–1970)

Personal information
- Born: 6 April 1911
- Died: 26 May 1970 (aged 59)

Cycling career
- Sport: Cycling
- Discipline: Road
- Role: Rider

Remy Royer (6 April 1911 – 26 May 1970) was a French racing cyclist. He rode in the 1936 Tour de France.
