= Nicolae Țapu =

Romanian cyclist

Personal information
- Born: 1907 Jilava, Kingdom of Romania
- Died: 1974 (aged 66–67)

Cycling career
- Sport: Cycling
- Discipline: Road
- Role: Rider

Nicolae Țapu (1907 – 1974) was a Romanian racing cyclist. He rode in the 1936 Tour de France.

Țapu was born in Jilava, Ilfov County.
