= Rudolf Fiket =

Yugoslav cyclist

Personal information
- Born: 5 February 1915

Cycling career
- Sport: Cycling
- Discipline: Road
- Role: Rider

Rudolf Fiket (5 February 1915 – 31 January 1978) was a Yugoslav racing cyclist. He rode in the 1936 Tour de France.

He died in 1978.
