= Zagradec pri Grosupljem =

Zagradec pri Grosupljem Zagradec (until 1955)
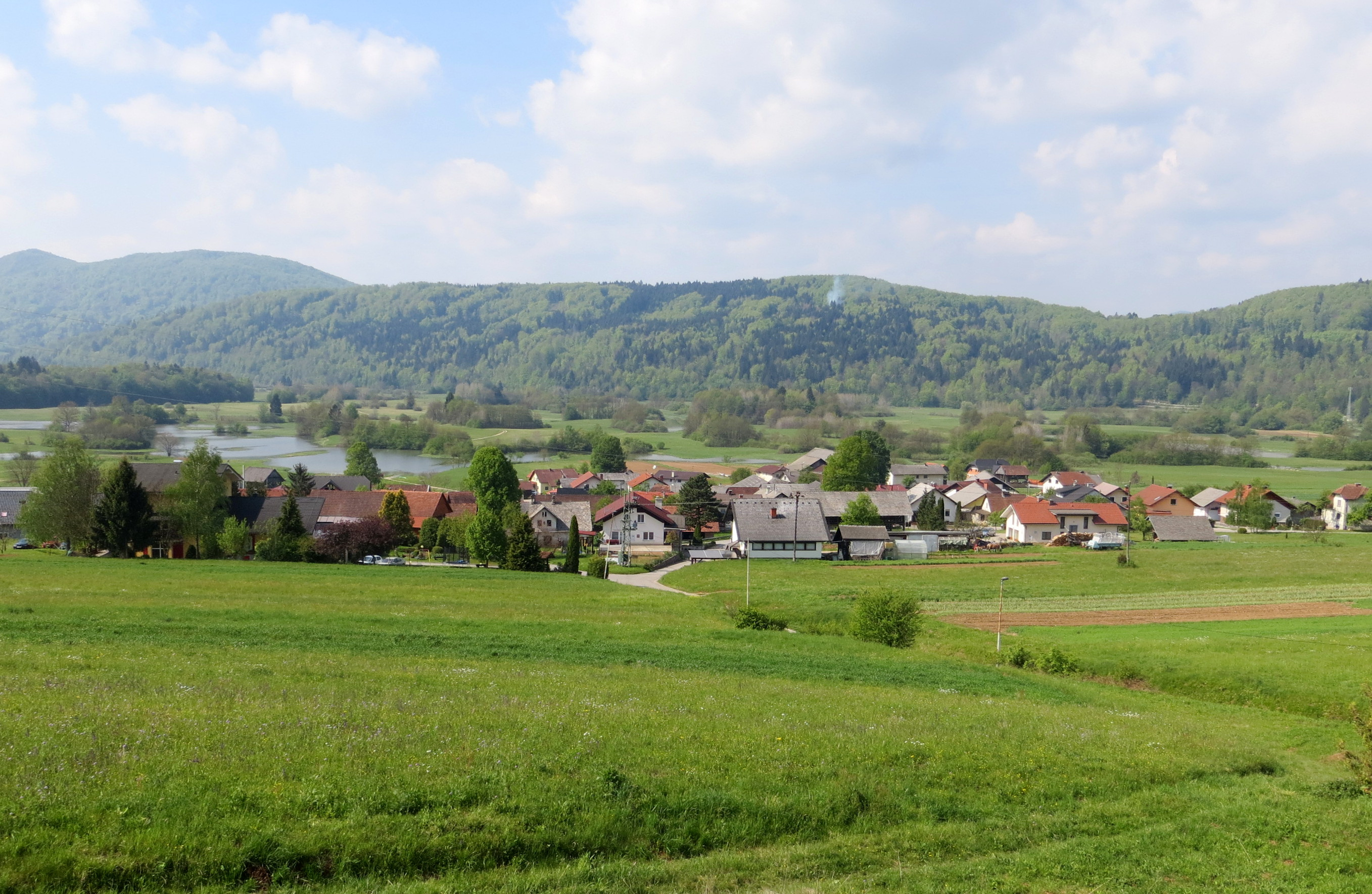

- Location in Slovenia
- Coordinates: 45°55′53.24″N 14°41′7.29″E
- Country: Slovenia
- Traditional region: Lower Carniola
- Statistical region: Central Slovenia
- Municipality: Grosuplje

Area
  - Total: 4.11 km^{2} (1.59 sq mi)
- Elevation: 329.1 m (1,080 ft)

Population (2002)
  - Total: 200

Zagradec pri Grosupljem (pronounced [zaˈɡɾaːdəts pɾi ɡɾɔˈsuːpljɛm]; German: Zagratz) is a settlement southeast of Grosuplje in central Slovenia. The area is part of the historical region of Lower Carniola and is included in the Central Slovenia Statistical Region.

== Name ==
The name of the settlement was changed from Zagradec to Zagradec pri Grosupljem in 1955. In the past the German name was Zagratz.
