= Constantin Tudose =

Romanian cyclist

Personal information
- Born: 1911
- Died: 1954 (aged 42–43)

Cycling career
- Sport: Cycling
- Discipline: Road
- Role: Rider

Constantin Tudose (1911 – 1954) was a Romanian racing cyclist. He rode in the 1936 Tour de France.
