= Stjepan Ljubić =

Yugoslav cyclist

Personal information
- Born: 11 August 1906 Virje, Kingdom of Croatia-Slavonia, Austria-Hungary
- Died: 14 August 1986 (aged 80) Zagreb, SR Croatia, SFR Yugoslavia

Cycling career
- Sport: Cycling

Stjepan Ljubić (11 August 1906 – 14 August 1986) was a Yugoslav cyclist. He competed in the individual and team road race events at the 1928 Summer Olympics. He also rode in the 1936 Tour de France.
