= Rajko Čubrić =

Yugoslav cyclist (born 1958)

Personal information
- Born: 21 February 1958 (age 68)

Cycling career
- Sport: Cycling

Rajko Čubrić (born 21 February 1958) is a Yugoslav former cyclist. He competed in the road race at the 1988 Summer Olympics.
