= Rudi Valenčič =

Yugoslav cyclist

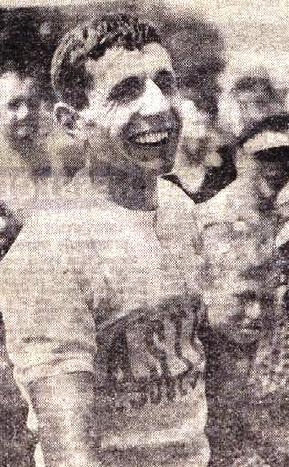

Personal information
- Born: 26 July 1941 (age 85) Pristava, Nova Gorica, Kingdom of Italy

Cycling career
- Sport: Cycling

Rudi Valenčič (born 26 July 1941) is a former Yugoslav cyclist. He competed in the individual road race and the team time trial events at the 1968 Summer Olympics.
