= Aleksandr Averin (cyclist) =

Soviet cyclist

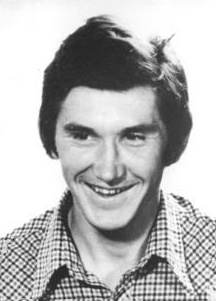
- Aleksandr Averin in 1977

Personal information
- Born: 11 April 1954 (age 72) Baku, Azerbaijan SSR, Soviet Union
- Height: 1.80 m (5 ft 11 in)
- Weight: 69 kg (152 lb)

Sport
- Sport: Cycling

Aleksandr Dmitriyevich Averin (Russian: Алекса́ндр Дми́триевич Аве́рин; born 11 April 1954) is a retired Soviet cyclist. He competed at the 1976 Summer Olympics in the road race and finished in 17th place. He won the multistage Peace Race individually in 1978 and with the Soviet team in 1977–1979.

He retired from competitions in 1983 and moved to Odesa, Ukraine, where he worked as a cycling coach. From the early 1990s to 2004 he taught physical education in a military institute. His son Maksym is a competitive cyclist who lives in Italy.
