= Stjepan Grgac =

Yugoslav cyclist

Personal information
- Born: September 17, 1909 Novaki, Austria-Hungary
- Died: December 15, 1960 Sesvete, Yugoslavia

Cycling career
- Sport: Cycling

Stjepan Grgac was a Yugoslav cyclist, who rode for Sokol Zagreb. He was four time Yugoslav national road race champion and he also competed on Tour de France in 1936.

In his honor, Stjepan Grgac Memorial, an international cycling race, is held every year since 1971.

In 2014 Hrvoje Bučar made a movie about him, titled Zabilježen u zvijezdama - Stjepan Grgac.
