= Radoš Čubrić =

Yugoslavian cyclist (1934–2017)

Personal information
- Born: 20 January 1934 Kraljevo, Yugoslavia
- Died: 20 August 2017 (aged 83) Kraljevo, Serbia

Cycling career
- Sport: Cycling

Radoš Čubrić (20 January 1934 – 20 August 2017) was a Yugoslav cyclist. He competed in the individual road race and team time trial events at the 1972 Summer Olympics. Čubrić was born in Kraljevo, his profession was a repairman.
