= 2018 Grand Prix Alanya =

- 2018 UCI Europe Tour

Race details
- Dates: 18 February 2018
- Stages: 1
- Distance: 175 km (109 mi)
- Winning time: 4h 03' 42"

Results
	Winner	Kirill Pozdnyakov (AZE)	(Synergy Baku)
	Second	Onur Balkan (TUR)	(Torku Şekerspor)
	Third	Ivan Balykin (RUS)	(Torku Şekerspor)

The 2018 Grand Prix Alanya was the 1st edition of the Grand Prix Alanya road cycling one day race. It was part of UCI Europe Tour in category 1.2.

== Teams ==
Twenty teams were invited to take part in the race. These included one UCI Professional Continental team, sixteen UCI Continental teams and three national teams.

UCI Professional Continental teams

- CCC–Sprandi–Polkowice

UCI Continental teams

- Apple Team
- Astana City
- Lviv Cycling Team
- Minsk Cycling Club
- Synergy Baku
- Team Novak
- Team Sapura Cycling
- Torku Şekerspor
- Vino–Astana Motors
- Salcano Sakarya
- Brisaspor Cycling Team
- Fiberli Antalya
- KZO Team
- Marathon-Tula Cycling Team
- CSA Steaua București
- Salcano Capaddocia

National teams

- Estonia
- Georgia
- Ukraine

== Result ==
Result
Rank	Rider	Team	Time
1	Kirill Pozdnyakov (AZE)	Synergy Baku	4h 03' 42"
2	Onur Balkan (TUR)	Torku Şekerspor	+ 1'20"
3	Ivan Balykin (RUS)	Torku Şekerspor	+ 1'20"
4	Oleksandr Polivoda (UKR)	Synergy Baku	+ 1'20"
5	Paweł Franczak (POL)	CCC–Sprandi–Polkowice	+ 1'20"
6	Roman Gladysh (UKR)	Ukraine	+ 1'20"
7	Yauhen Sobal (BLR)	Minsk Cycling Club	+ 1'20"
8	Cristian Raileanu (MDA)	Torku Şekerspor	+ 1'20"
9	Ahmet Örken (TUR)	Salcano Sakarya	+ 1'20"
10	Branislau Samoilau (BLR)	Minsk Cycling Club	+ 1'22"
