= Velopark (Baku) =

Cycle racing venue

Coordinates: 40.31°N 49.81°E

The Velopark is a cycle sport venue and it is located in the city of Baku, Azerbaijan.

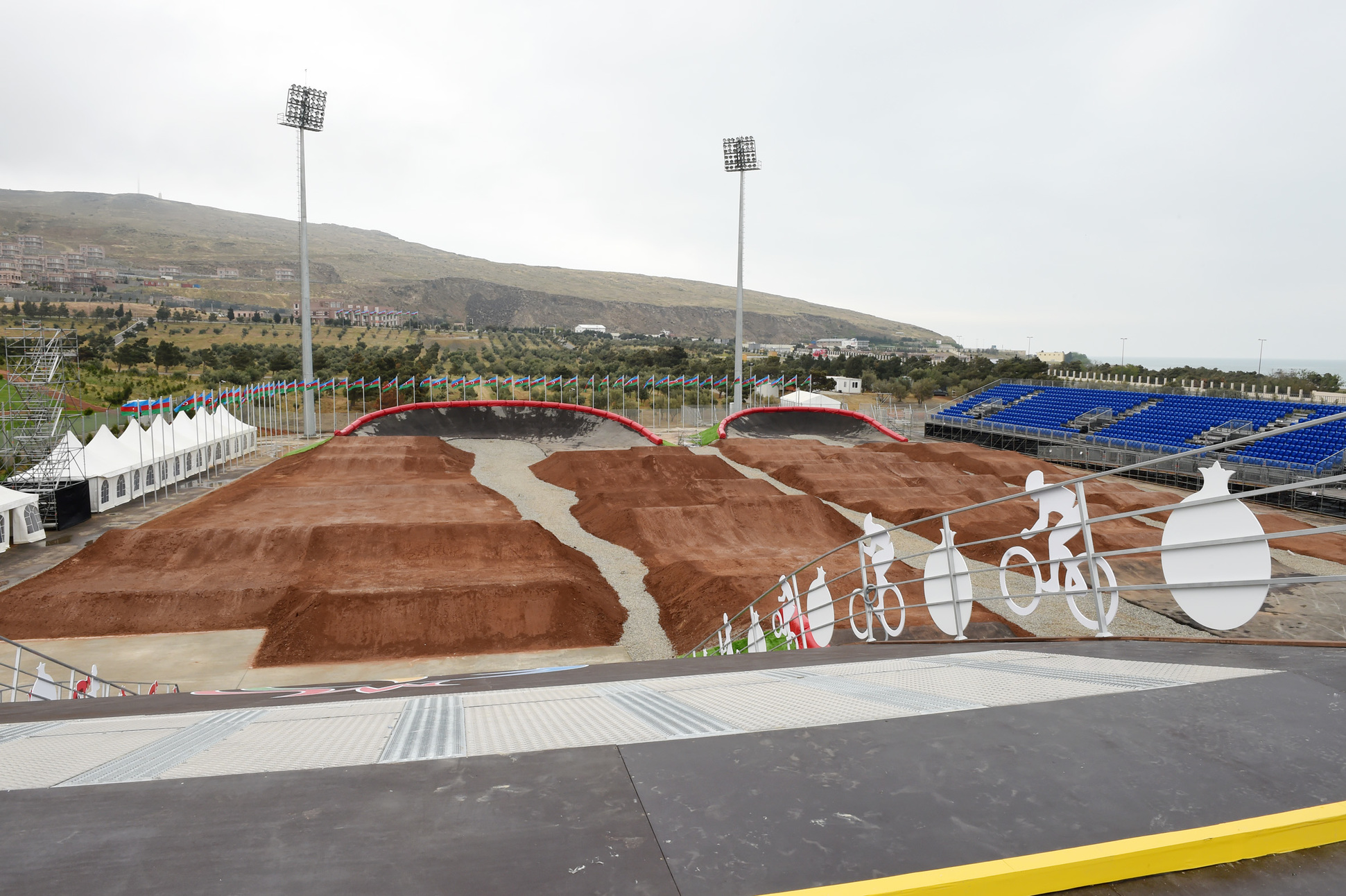
Opening of the Baku Bike Park

== About ==
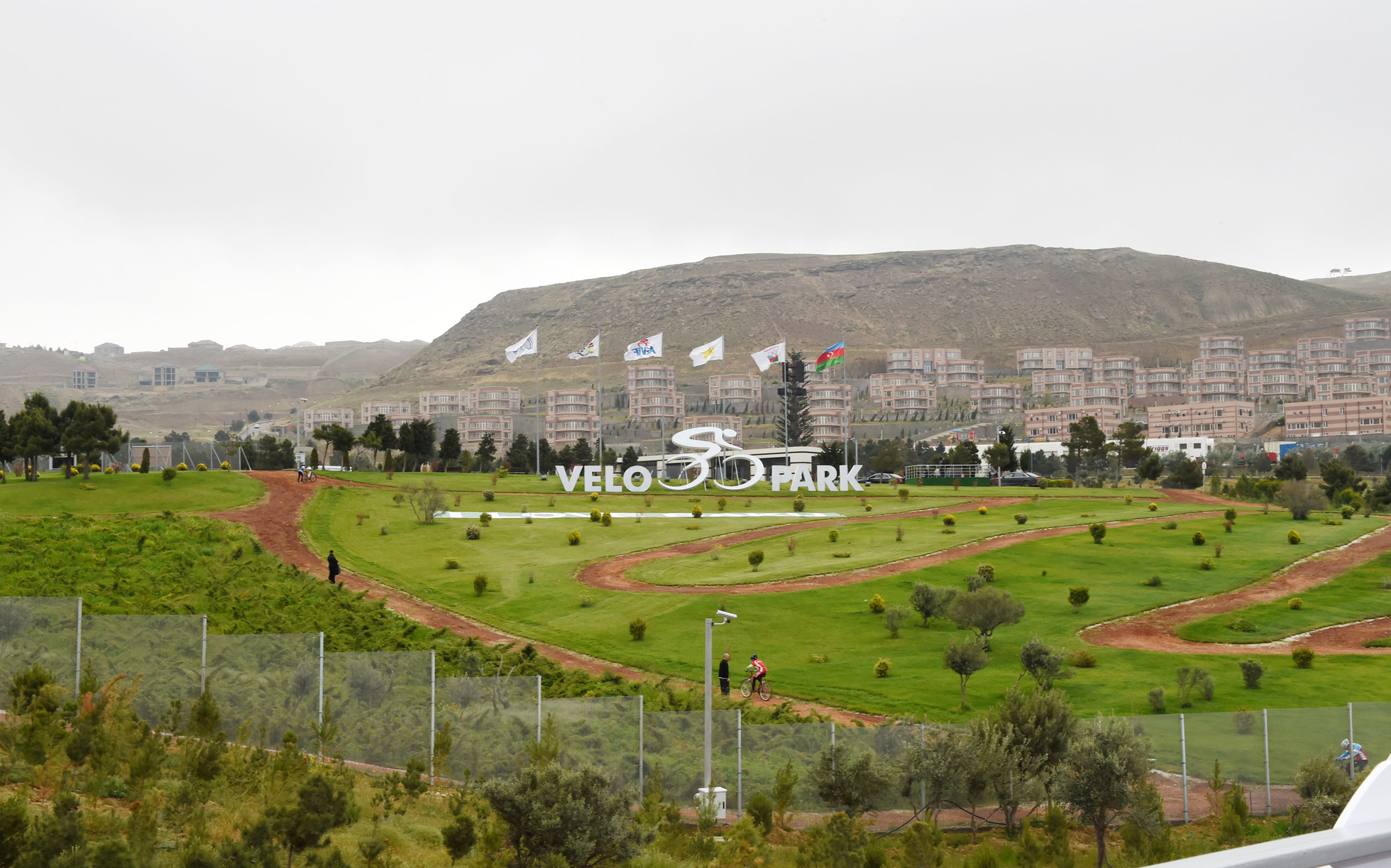
The Baku Bike Park

Ilham Aliyev, Mehriban Aliyeva (chairman of the Baku 2015 First European Games Organizing Committee) and Arzu Aliyeva participated in the opening of Velopark. The park in the territory of "Velopark" was created in the early 1970s. In September 2005, cleaning works were started in this territory. In 2013, the area of the park was handed over to the Azerbaijan Cycling Federation as a base. During this period, the Federation planted thousands of trees on 40 hectares of land, 4 routes for cycle races, including mountain biking. There is a registration center, doping control, doping sample analysis rooms, a meeting room with 25 seats and other rooms in the two - storey buildings constructed in the territory of the Velopark. There are also parking spaces, registration and other service areas for VIP guests, Olympic family, representatives of international federations, official representatives.

== BMX velopark ==
BMX velopark was built for the European Games in Velopark, with a total area of more than 30 hectares. The ground with barriers created for BMX velopark is 6,700 square meters area. 1197 seats for spectators were created here. This sport centre is in the south of the Flag Square and European Games Park.

== Events ==
- On March 15–16, 2014, the Criterium bike race was held in the Velopark.
- The 2.1-round Tour d'Azerbaidjan-2015 international cycling race of the International Cycling Union was held in Velopark with representatives of 25 teams from 24 countries of the world on May 6, 2015.
- On May 4, 2015, the project of 4,000 tree planting in VeloPark completed.
- Baku 2015 European Games was held at the BMX Velopark
- The 2018 UCI BMX World Championships were held in the Velopark.

== Bicycle races in Azerbaijan ==
Holding bicycle races in Azerbaijan coincides with the beginning of the 40s of the last century. At present, schools and clubs for cycling are operating in the country. Members of "Synergy Baku Cycling Project" bike team participate in European and Asian tours organized by International Cycling Union since 2013.

== See also ==
Baku Olympic Stadium

Cycling in Azerbaijan
