= List of Azerbaijani records in track cycling =

The following are the national records in track cycling in Azerbaijan maintained by the Azerbaijan Cycling Federation (AzViF).

== Men ==
Event	Record	Athlete	Date	Meet	Place	Ref
Flying 200 m time trial	10.805	Sergiy Omelchenko	28 June 2019	European Games	Minsk, Belarus	
250 m time trial (standing start)						
Team sprint						
1 km time trial						
1 km time trial (sea level)						
4000 m individual pursuit	4:40.822	Elchin Asadov	6 August 2022	Islamic Solidarity Games	Konya, Turkey	
4000 m team pursuit						

== Women ==
Event	Record	Athlete	Date	Meet	Place	Ref
Flying 200 m time trial	11.143	Olga Panarina	5 March 2016	World Championships	London, United Kingdom	
500 m time trial						
3000 m individual pursuit	4:16.727	Lala Abdurahmanova	6 August 2022	Islamic Solidarity Games	Konya, Turkey	
3000 m team pursuit						
