= 2018 Tour of Mediterrennean =

- 2018 UCI Europe Tour

Race details
- Dates: 2-4 March 2018
- Stages: 3
- Distance: 434.9 km (270.2 mi)
- Winning time: 10h 07' 36"

Results
| | Winner | Onur Balkan (TUR) | (Torku Şekerspor) |
| | Second | Batuhan Özgür (TUR) | (Torku Şekerspor) |
| | Third | Tymur Malieiev (UKR) | (Lviv Cycling Team) |

The 2018 Tour of Mediterrennean was the 1st edition of the Tour of Mediterrennean road cycling stage race. It was part of UCI Europe Tour in category 2.2.

== Teams ==
Eighteen teams were invited to take part in the race. These included seventeen UCI Continental teams and one national team.

UCI Continental teams

- Synergy Baku
- Lviv Cycling Team
- Gun Ay Tabriz Team
- Astana City
- Vino–Astana Motors
- Minsk Cycling Club
- Team Sapura Cycling
- Apple Team
- Torku Şekerspor
- Dynamo Palmira Cycling Team
- Marathon-Tula
- Eritrel Sport Club
- Almaaty Bro Team
- Brisaspor Cycling Team
- Salcano Capaddocia
- Yeşil Pedal Spor Kulübü
- Salcano Sakarya

National teams

- Estonia

== Route ==
Stage schedule
| Stage | Date | Route | Distance | Type | Winner |
|---|---|---|---|---|---|
| 1 | 2 March | Antakya to Adana | 196.4 km (122 mi) | Flat stage | Tymur Malieiev (UKR) |
| 2 | 3 March | Adana to Mersin | 121.6 km (76 mi) | Flat stage | Onur Balkan (TUR) |
| 3 | 4 March | Mersin to Mersin | 116.9 km (73 mi) | Flat stage | Onur Balkan (TUR) |

== Stages ==
=== Stage 1 ===
2 March 2018 — Antakya to Adana, 196.4 km (122 mi)

Result of Stage 1
| Rank | Rider | Team | Time |
|---|---|---|---|
| 1 | Tymur Malieiev (UKR) | Lviv Cycling Team | 4h 51' 26" |
| 2 | Siarhei Papok (BLR) | Minsk Cycling Club | + 0" |
| 3 | Dylan Page (SUI) | Team Sapura Cycling | + 0" |
| 4 | Norman Vahtra (EST) | Estonia | + 0" |
| 5 | Vadim Galeyev (KAZ) | Apple Team | + 0" |
| 6 | Batuhan Özgür (TUR) | Torku Şekerspor | + 0" |
| 7 | Nikolai Shumov (BLR) | Minsk Cycling Club | + 0" |
| 8 | Samir Jabrayilov (AZE) | Synergy Baku | + 0" |
| 9 | Stanislau Bazhkou (BLR) | Minsk Cycling Club | + 0" |
| 10 | Daniel Habtemichael (ERI) | Eritrel Sport Club | + 0" |

General classification after Stage 1
| Rank | Rider | Team | Time |
|---|---|---|---|
| 1 | Tymur Malieiev (UKR) | Lviv Cycling Team | 4h 51' 16" |
| 2 | Siarhei Papok (BLR) | Minsk Cycling Club | + 4" |
| 3 | Dylan Page (SUI) | Team Sapura Cycling | + 6" |
| 4 | Norman Vahtra (EST) | Estonia | + 10" |
| 5 | Vadim Galeyev (KAZ) | Apple Team | + 10" |
| 6 | Batuhan Özgür (TUR) | Torku Şekerspor | + 10" |
| 7 | Nikolai Shumov (BLR) | Minsk Cycling Club | + 10" |
| 8 | Samir Jabrayilov (AZE) | Synergy Baku | + 10" |
| 9 | Stanislau Bazhkou (BLR) | Minsk Cycling Club | + 10" |
| 10 | Daniel Habtemichael (ERI) | Eritrel Sport Club | + 10" |

=== Stage 2 ===
3 March 2018 — Adana to Mersin, 121.6 km (76 mi)

Result of Stage 2
| Rank | Rider | Team | Time |
|---|---|---|---|
| 1 | Onur Balkan (TUR) | Torku Şekerspor | 2h 43' 32" |
| 2 | Batuhan Özgür (TUR) | Torku Şekerspor | + 0" |
| 3 | Yunus Emre Yilmaz (TUR) | Brisaspor Cycling Team | + 0" |
| 4 | Siarhei Papok (BLR) | Minsk Cycling Club | + 0" |
| 5 | Ahmet Örken (TUR) | Salcano Sakarya | + 0" |
| 6 | Andrey Prostokishin (RUS) | Marathon-Tula | + 0" |
| 7 | Maksym Vasilyev (UKR) | Lviv Cycling Team | + 0" |
| 8 | Dylan Page (SUI) | Team Sapura Cycling | + 0" |
| 9 | Michael Habtom (ERI) | Eritrel Sport Club | + 0" |
| 10 | Grigoriy Shtein (KAZ) | Astana City | + 0" |

General classification after Stage 2
| Rank | Rider | Team | Time |
|---|---|---|---|
| 1 | Tymur Malieiev (UKR) | Lviv Cycling Team | 7h 34' 48" |
| 2 | Onur Balkan (TUR) | Torku Şekerspor | + 0" |
| 3 | Siarhei Papok (BLR) | Minsk Cycling Club | + 4" |
| 4 | Batuhan Özgür (TUR) | Torku Şekerspor | + 4" |
| 5 | Dylan Page (SUI) | Team Sapura Cycling | + 6" |
| 6 | Yunus Emre Yilmaz (TUR) | Brisaspor Cycling Team | + 6" |
| 7 | Ahmet Örken (TUR) | Salcano Sakarya | + 10" |
| 8 | Norman Vahtra (EST) | Estonia | + 10" |
| 9 | Michael Habtom (ERI) | Eritrel Sport Club | + 10" |
| 10 | Vadim Galeyev (KAZ) | Apple Team | + 10" |

=== Stage 3 ===
4 March 2018 — Mersin to Mersin, 116.9 km (73 mi)

Result of Stage 3
| Rank | Rider | Team | Time |
|---|---|---|---|
| 1 | Onur Balkan (TUR) | Torku Şekerspor | 2h 32' 58" |
| 2 | Batuhan Özgür (TUR) | Torku Şekerspor | + 0" |
| 3 | Maksim Sukhov (RUS) | Marathon-Tula | + 0" |
| 4 | Siarhei Papok (BLR) | Minsk Cycling Club | + 0" |
| 5 | Nikolai Shumov (BLR) | Minsk Cycling Club | + 0" |
| 6 | Norman Vahtra (EST) | Estonia | + 0" |
| 7 | Vadim Galeyev (KAZ) | Apple Team | + 0" |
| 8 | Oguzhan Tiryaki (TUR) | Salcano Capaddocia | + 0" |
| 9 | Samir Jabrayilov (AZE) | Synergy Baku | + 0" |
| 10 | Dylan Page (SUI) | Team Sapura Cycling | + 0" |

General classification after Stage 3
| Rank | Rider | Team | Time |
|---|---|---|---|
| 1 | Onur Balkan (TUR) | Torku Şekerspor | 10h 07' 36" |
| 2 | Batuhan Özgür (TUR) | Torku Şekerspor | + 8" |
| 3 | Tymur Malieiev (UKR) | Lviv Cycling Team | + 12" |
| 4 | Siarhei Papok (BLR) | Minsk Cycling Club | + 14" |
| 5 | Dylan Page (SUI) | Team Sapura Cycling | + 16" |
| 6 | Yunus Emre Yilmaz (TUR) | Brisaspor Cycling Team | + 18" |
| 7 | Norman Vahtra (EST) | Estonia | + 20" |
| 8 | Vadim Galeyev (KAZ) | Apple Team | + 20" |
| 9 | Samir Jabrayilov (AZE) | Synergy Baku | + 20" |
| 10 | Michael Habtom (ERI) | Eritrel Sport Club | + 20" |

== Classification leadership table ==
In the 2018 Tour of Mediterrennean, three different jerseys were awarded for the main classifications. For the general classification, calculated by adding each cyclist's finishing times on each stage, the leader received a yellow jersey. This classification was considered the most important of the 2018 Tour of Mediterrennean, and the winner of the classification was considered the winner of the race.

Additionally, there was a points classification, which awarded a green jersey. In the points classification, cyclists received points for finishing in the top 15 in a mass-start stage. For winning a stage, a rider earned 15 points, with 14 for second, 13 for third, with a point fewer per place down to a single point for 15th place. Points towards the classification could also be accrued at intermediate sprint points during each stage. The winner of the intermediate sprint earned 6 points, with 4 for second and 2 for third. There was also a mountains classification, the leadership of which was marked by an orange jersey. In the mountains classification, points were won by reaching the top of a climb before other cyclists, with more points available for the higher-categorised climbs.

| Stage | Winner | General classification | Points classification | Mountains classification | Teams classification |
|---|---|---|---|---|---|
| 1 | Tymur Malieiev | Tymur Malieiev | Tymur Malieiev | Hanibal Tesfay | Minsk Cycling Club |
| 2 | Onur Balkan | Tymur Malieiev | Siarhei Papok | Hanibal Tesfay | Torku Şekerspor |
| 3 | Onur Balkan | Onur Balkan | Batuhan Özgür | Hanibal Tesfay | Torku Şekerspor |
| Final | | Onur Balkan | Batuhan Özgür | Hanibal Tesfay | Torku Şekerspor |
