= Tour de Azerbaijan (disambiguation) =

Tour du Azerbaijan or Azerbaijan Cycling Tour may refer to:

- Tour of Azerbaijan (Iran) is a UCI 2.1 multistage road racing cycling tour held in Iranian Azerbaijan, Iran since 1986.
- Tour d'Azerbaïdjan is a UCI 2.1 multistage road bicycle race held in Republic of Azerbaijan since 2012.
