= Pavlukhin =

Pavlukhin (Russian: Павлухин) is a Russian masculine surname, its feminine counterpart is Pavlukhina. Notable people with the surname include:

- Olena Pavlukhina (born 1989), Ukrainian-born road cyclist
