= Lviv Cycling Team =

Lviv Cycling Team may refer to:

- Lviv Cycling Team (men's team), a cycling team that competes on the UCI Continental Circuits
- Lviv Cycling Team (women's team), a cycling team that competes as a UCI Women's Continental Team
