= Samir Jabrayilov =

Ukrainian-born Azerbaijani cyclist

Personal information
- Full name: Samir Jabrayilov
- Born: 7 September 1994 (age 32) Cherkasy, Ukraine

Cycling career
- Sport: Cycling
- Discipline: Road
- Role: Rider

Professional teams
- 2013–2018: Synergy Baku
- 2019: Minsk Cycling Club

Samir Jabrayilov (born 7 September 1994 in Cherkasy) is a Ukrainian-born Azerbaijani cyclist, who last rode for UCI Continental team Minsk Cycling Club.

== Major results ==
2013
1st Road race, National Road Championships
1st Stage 5 Jelajah Malaysia
2014
National Road Championships

2nd Time trial
3rd Road race

5th Tour of Yancheng Coastal Wetlands
2015
National Road Championships

1st Under-23 time trial
1st Under-23 road race
3rd Time trial
3rd Road race

2016
National Road Championships

2nd Road race
3rd Time trial

2nd Grand Prix of ISD
3rd Horizon Park Race for Peace
4th Overall Tour of Ukraine

1st Young rider classification

5th Grand Prix of Vinnytsia
2017
3rd Time trial, National Road Championships
8th Horizon Park Classic
2018
2nd Road race, National Road Championships
2nd Grand Prix Side
9th Overall Tour of Mediterrennean
2019
National Road Championships

2nd Road race
2nd Time trial

2nd Overall Tour of Black Sea
4th Grand Prix Velo Erciyes
5th Overall Tour of Mevlana
10th Race Horizon Park Classic
2021
National Road Championships

2nd Road race
2nd Time trial
