= Elchin Asadov =

Azerbaijani cyclist (born 1987)

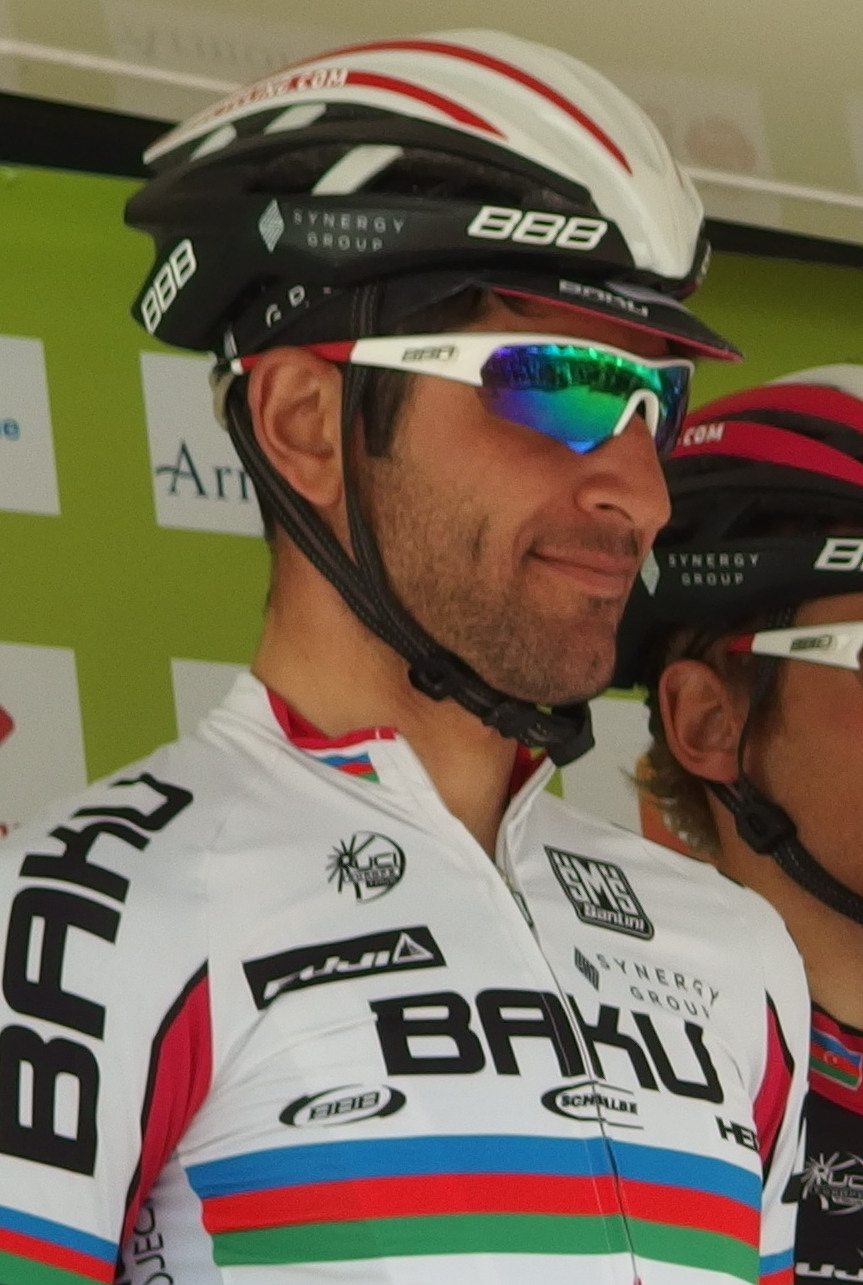
- Asadov in 2015

Personal information
- Full name: Elchin Asadov
- Born: 12 February 1987 (age 39): Fuzuli, Azerbaijan SSR, Soviet Union; (now Azerbaijan)

Cycling career
- Sport: Cycling
- Current team: Sakarya BB Pro Team
- Discipline: Road
- Role: Rider

Professional teams
- 2012: Team Specialized Concept Store
- 2013–2018: Synergy Baku
- 2019: Lviv Cycling Team
- 2019–2020: VIB Sports
- 2021–: Salcano–Sakarya BB Team

Elchin Asadov (Azerbaijani: Elçin Rafiq oğlu Əsədov, born 12 February 1987) is an Azerbaijani racing cyclist, who currently rides for UCI Continental team Sakarya BB Pro Team. He rode at the 2014 UCI Road World Championships.

Asadov represented Azerbaijan at the 2021 Summer Olympics in Japan. However he did not reach the finish line in the individual event.

== Major results ==
2012
National Road Championships

1st Time trial
2nd Road race

6th Overall Tour of Trakya
2013
National Road Championships

1st Time trial
3rd Road race

6th Overall Jelajah Malaysia
2014
National Road Championships

1st Time trial
1st Road race

2015
National Road Championships

2nd Time trial
2nd Road race

2016
National Road Championships

1st Time trial
3rd Road race

6th Odessa Grand Prix
7th UAE Cup
9th Tour de Ribas
2017
1st Time trial, National Road Championships
1st Stage 7 Tour du Maroc
3rd Tour de Ribas
5th Minsk Cup
6th Odessa Grand Prix
7th Horizon Park Race for Peace
9th Horizon Park Race Maidan
2018
National Road Championships

1st Time trial
3rd Road race

6th Overall Tour of Fatih Sultan Mehmet
2019
National Road Championships

1st Time trial
1st Road race

1st Stage 1 Tour of Peninsular
Challenge du Prince

2nd Trophée de l'Anniversaire
3rd Trophée de la Maison Royale
9th Trophée Princier

5th Bursa Orhangazi Race
5th Grand Prix Velo Erciyes
7th Overall Tour of Mevlana
7th Overall Tour of Peninsular
7th Horizon Park Race for Peace
8th Bursa Yıldırım Bayezıt Race
8th Horizon Park Race Classic
10th Overall Tour of Mesopotamia
10th Overall Tour of Black Sea
10th Chabany Race
2020
3rd Grand Prix Velo Erciyes
2022
National Road Championships

1st Time trial
1st Road race

4th Grand Prix Yahyalı
5th Overall Tour of Albania
7th Islamic Solidarity Games ME - Road Race
9th Grand Prix Erciyes
9th Grand Prix Develi
10th Grand Prix Kayseri
10th Grand Prix Kapuzbaşı
