= Grand Prix Alanya =

Cycling competition in Turkey

Race details
- Date: February
- Discipline: Road
- Competition: UCI Europe Tour 1.2
- Type: One-day race
- Web site: gpalanya.veloalanya.com

History
- First edition: Men: 2018; Women: 2019
- Editions: Men: 5 (as of 2022); Women: 2 (as of 2021)
- First winner: Men: Kirill Pozdnyakov (AZE); Women: Tatsiana Sharakova (BLR)
- Most wins: No repeat winners
- Most recent: Men: Alessio Martinelli (ITA); Women: Diana Klimova (RUS)

The Grand Prix Alanya is a cycling race held in Alanya, Turkey. It is part of UCI Europe Tour in category 1.2.

== Winners – Men's race ==
Year	Country	Rider	Team
2018	Azerbaijan	Kirill Pozdnyakov	Synergy Baku
2019	Germany	Lucas Carstensen	Bike Aid
2020	Poland	Paweł Bernas	Mazowsze Serce Polski
2021	Italy	Davide Gabburo	Bardiani–CSF–Faizanè
2022	Italy	Alessio Martinelli	Bardiani–CSF–Faizanè
2022-2026	No race		

== Winners – Women's race ==
Year	Country	Rider	Team
2019	Belarus	Tatsiana Sharakova	Minsk Cycling Club
2020	Russia	Diana Klimova	Cogeas–Mettler–Look
