= IAM–Excelsior =

Team information
- UCI code: IAM
- Registered: Switzerland
- Founded: 2019
- Status: UCI Continental (2019–)

Team name history
- 2019–: IAM–Excelsior

IAM–Excelsior is a professional road bicycle racing team which participates in elite races. The team registered with the UCI for the 2019 season.

== Team roster ==
| Rider | Date of birth |
|---|---|
| Giacomo Ballabio (ITA) | 10 January 1998 (age 28) |
| Remi Capron (FRA) | 18 June 2000 (age 26) |
| Thomas Clapasson (SUI) | 20 April 1999 (age 27) |
| Antoine Debons (SUI) | 17 February 1998 (age 28) |
| Quentin Guex (SUI) | 23 September 1996 (age 29) |
| Fabian Lienhard (SUI) | 3 September 1993 (age 33) |
| Dylan Page (SUI) | 5 November 1993 (age 32) |

| Rider | Date of birth |
|---|---|
| Simon Pellaud (SUI) | 6 November 1992 (age 33) |
| Scott Quincey (SUI) | 17 June 1999 (age 27) |
| Anthony Rappo (SUI) | 25 July 1995 (age 31) |
| Martin Schäppi (SUI) | 12 December 1996 (age 29) |
| Joab Schneiter (SUI) | 6 August 1998 (age 28) |
| Samuele Zoccarato (ITA) | 9 January 1998 (age 28) |

== Major results ==
2019
Stage 1 Tour du Loir et Cher E Provost, Simon Pellaud
Stage 2 Tour du Loir et Cher E Provost, Fabian Lienhard
Flèche Ardennaise, Simon Pellaud
Overall Tour de la Mirabelle, Simon Pellaud
