= Jan Sokol (cyclist) =

Austrian cyclist (born 1990)

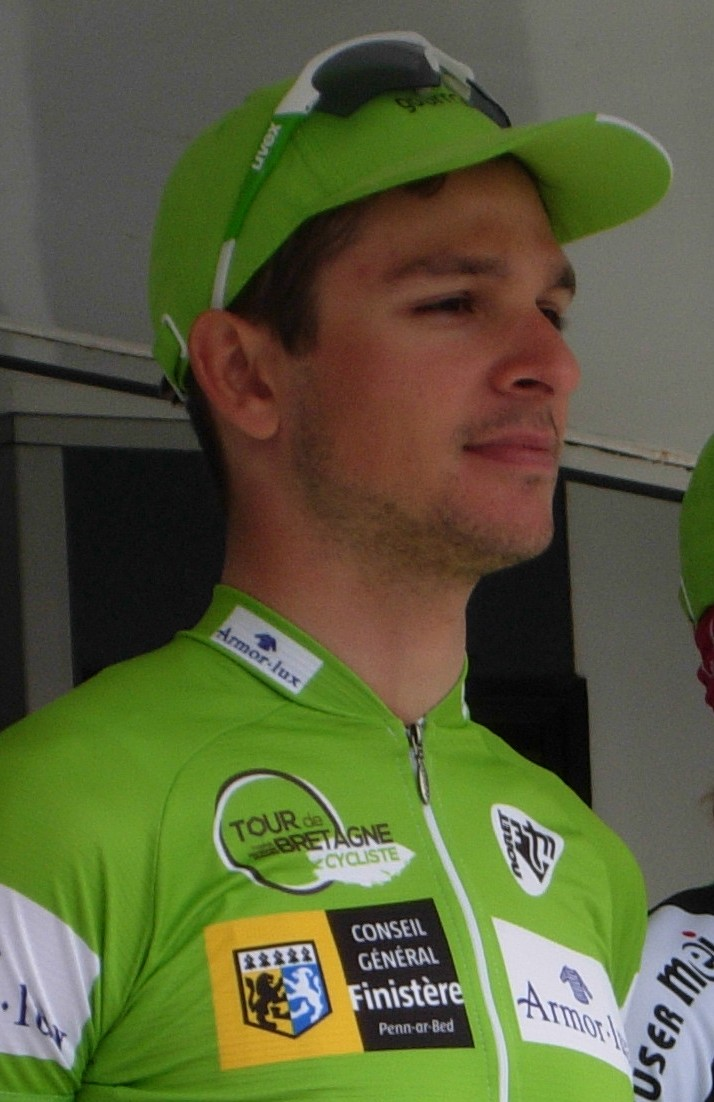
- Sokol in 2013

Personal information
- Full name: Jan Sokol
- Born: 26 September 1990 (age 36) Vienna, Austria

Cycling career
- Sport: Cycling
- Current team: Retired
- Discipline: Road
- Role: Rider

Professional teams
- 2010–2013: RC Arbö–Gourmetfein–Wels
- 2014: Synergy Baku
- 2015–2016: WSA–Greenlife

Jan Sokol (born 26 September 1990) is an Austrian former professional racing cyclist, who rode professionally between 2010 and 2016. He rode at the 2013 UCI Road World Championships.

== Major results ==
2008
4th Overall Giro della Lunigiana
2011
1st Stage 1 (TTT) Sibiu Cycling Tour
2012
7th Miskolc GP
9th Ronde van Vlaanderen U23
2013
2nd Miskolc GP
2nd Banja Luka Belgrade I
3rd Banja Luka Belgrade II
8th Croatia–Slovenia
2014
1st Stage 3 An Post Rás
