= Joab Schneiter =

Swiss cyclist

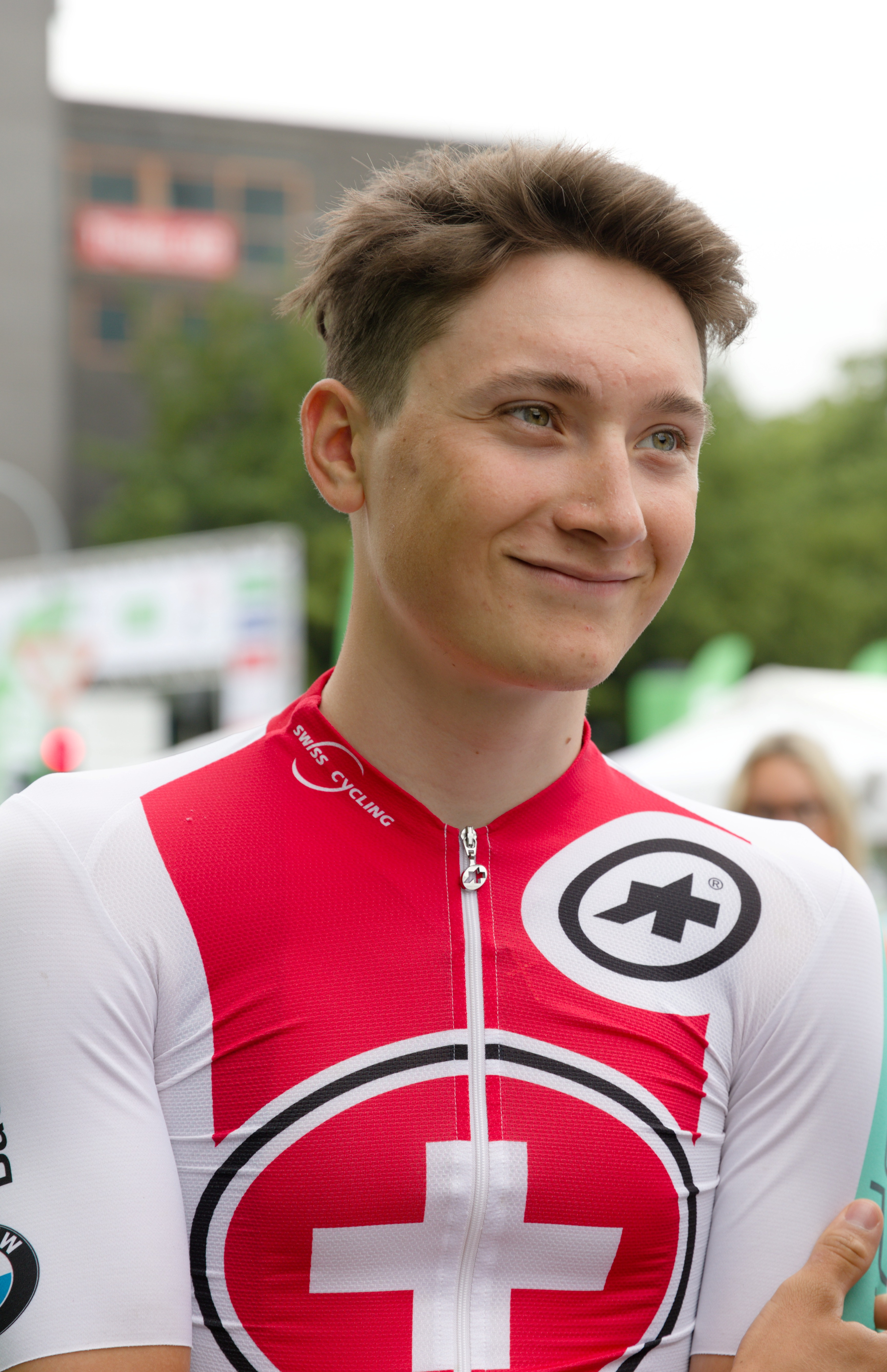
- Schneiter at the 2018 Rund um Köln

Personal information
- Born: 6 August 1998 (age 28) Ittigen, Switzerland

Cycling career
- Sport: Cycling
- Discipline: Road
- Role: Rider

Amateur teams
- 2017–2018: Exploit–Goomah Bikes
- 2018: IAM–Excelsior

Professional teams
- 2019: IAM–Excelsior
- 2020: Swiss Racing Academy
- 2021: Vini Zabù

Joab Schneiter (born 6 August 1998) is a Swiss cyclist, who last rode for UCI ProTeam Vini Zabù.

== Major results ==
2016
7th Overall Driedaagse van Axel
2018
8th Umag Trophy
2020
1st Stage 1 Tour de Savoie Mont Blanc
7th Il Piccolo Lombardia
