= Dylan Page (cyclist) =

Swiss cyclist

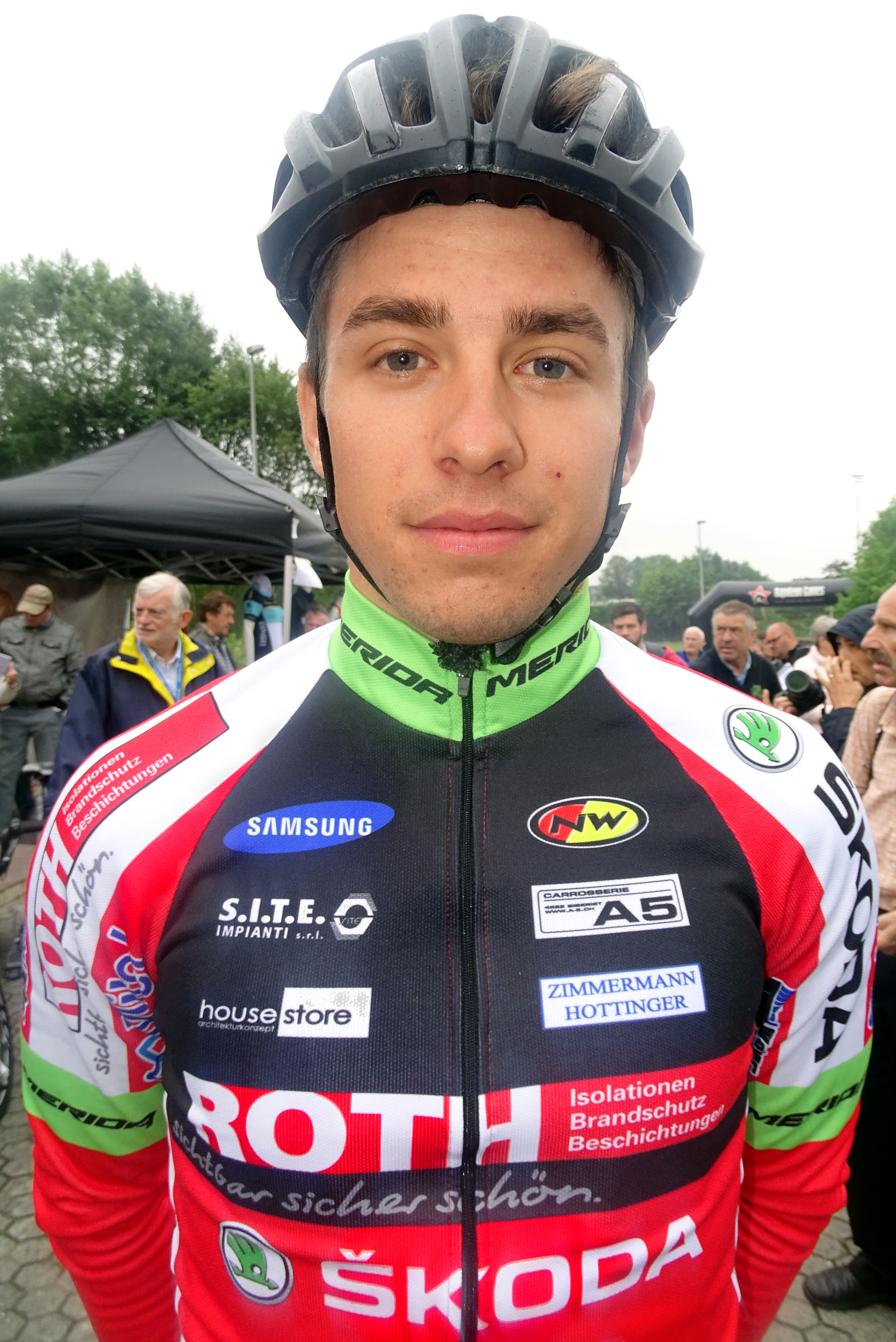
- Page in August 2015

Personal information
- Full name: Dylan Page
- Born: 5 November 1993 (age 32) Switzerland

Cycling career
- Sport: Cycling
- Current team: Retired
- Discipline: Road
- Role: Rider

Professional teams
- 2015–2016: Roth–Škoda
- 2017: Caja Rural–Seguros RGA
- 2018: Team Sapura Cycling
- 2019: IAM–Excelsior

Dylan Page (born 5 November 1993) is a Swiss former professional cyclist, who rode professionally between 2015 and 2019 for the Team Roth, Caja Rural–Seguros RGA, Team Sapura Cycling and IAM–Excelsior teams.

== Major results ==
2014
8th Paris–Tours Espoirs
2015
8th Tour de Vendée
9th Trofeo Playa de Palma
2016
3rd Trofeo Playa de Palma
2017
6th Vuelta a La Rioja
2018
1st Stage 1 Tour de Indonesia
5th Overall Tour of Mediterrennean
5th Overall Tour de Siak
