= Lviv Cycling Team (men's team) =

Ukrainian cycling team

Team information
- UCI code: LCT
- Registered: Ukraine
- Founded: 2017
- Discipline: Road
- Status: Amateur (2017, 2020); UCI Continental (2018–2019, 2021–)

Key personnel
- General manager: Anatoliy Veselov

Team name history
- 2017–: Lviv Cycling Team

Lviv Cycling Team is a Ukrainian UCI Continental cycling team established in 2017. It gained UCI Continental status in 2018.

== Team roster ==
As of 19 February 2021.

Rider	Date of birth
Justas Beniušis (LTU)	18 November 1997 (age 28)
Maxwell De Broeder (BEL)	6 May 1999 (age 27)
Toni Franz (GER)	5 January 1997 (age 29)
Bernardo Gonçalves (POR)	13 August 1998 (age 28)
Mantas Januškevičius (LTU)	29 April 1999 (age 27)
Dmytro Kachur (UKR)	8 November 2001 (age 24)
Raphaël Kockelmann (LUX)	10 May 1999 (age 27)
Oleksandr Kryvych (UKR)	8 September 1999 (age 26)
Venantas Lašinis (LTU)	26 February 1997 (age 29)

Rider	Date of birth
Oleksandr Prevar (UKR)	28 June 1990 (age 36)
Oliver Robinson (GBR)	30 March 1999 (age 27)
Valeri Romanenkov (UKR)	29 September 1999 (age 26)
Ivan Savchuk (UKR)	25 December 2002 (age 23)
Oleksandr Smetaniuk (UKR)	29 December 2001 (age 24)
Brecht Stas (BEL)	19 September 1995 (age 30)
Vadym Stetsiuk (UKR)	25 May 2002 (age 24)
Oles Susol (UKR)	5 August 2001 (age 25)
Nicolas Wernimont (BEL)	5 April 2000 (age 26)

== Major wins ==
2018
Stage 1 Tour of Mediterrennean, Tymur Malieiev
2019
Azerbaijan National Road race, Elchin Asadov
Azerbaijan National Time trial, Elchin Asadov

== National, continental, world and Olympic champions ==
2019
Azerbaijani Road race, Elchin Asadov
Azerbaijani Time trial, Elchin Asadov
