= Ukrainian Cycling Federation =

National governing body of cycle racing in Ukraine

- Федерація велосипедного спорту України
- Abbreviation: FCU
- Headquarters: Kyiv, Ukraine
- Location: Esplanadna st, 42 - 01601 KIEV - Ukraine
- Official language: Ukrainian
- President: Andriy Grivko
- Affiliations: National Olympic Committee of Ukraine (НОКУ), Union Cycliste Internationale (UCI), European Cycling Union (UEC)
- Website: velosport.org.ua

The Ukrainian Cycling Federation (Ukrainian: Федерація велосипедного спорту України), abbreviated to FCU, is the national governing body of cycle racing in Ukraine.

The FCU is a member of the UCI and the UEC. In 2025, after a prolonged struggle between president Andriy Grivko and his predecessor, it was replaced by a new organism admitted to the UCI under the name Public Association Ukrainian Cycling Federation.

The federation also organizes in hosting the Ukrainian National Road Race Championships and Ukrainian National Time Trial Championships, providing a platform for domestic riders to vie for national titles in various road cycling disciplines.

== See also ==
- Ukrainian National Road Race Championships
- Ukrainian National Time Trial Championships
