= Ukrainian National Time Trial Championships =

National road cycling championship in Ukraine

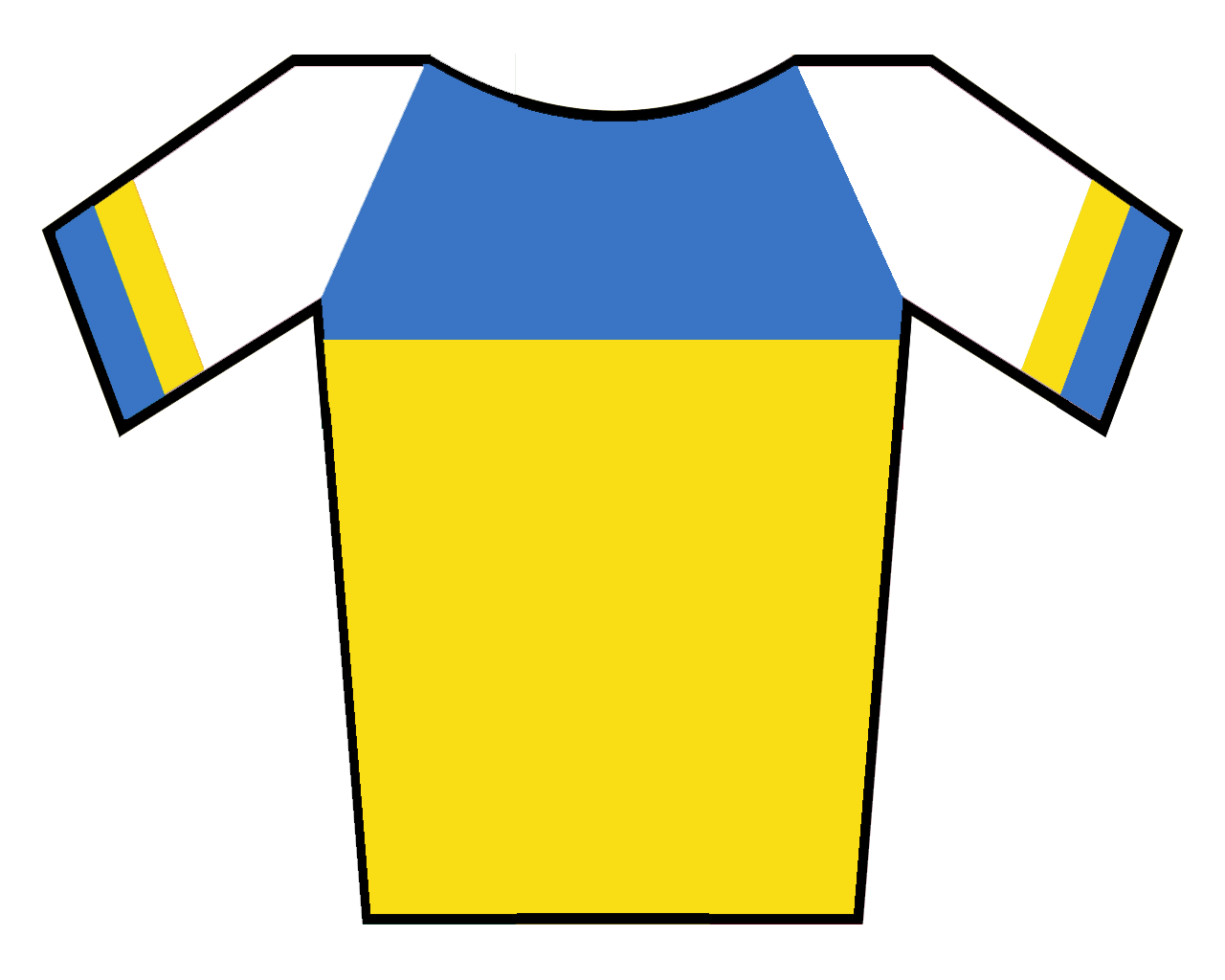
- The champion's jersey

Race details
- Date: June
- Discipline: Road
- Type: One-day race
- Organiser: Ukrainian Cycling Federation

History
- First edition: 1992

The Ukrainian National Time Trial Championships is a road cycling competition held since 1997.

== Men ==
=== Elite ===
Year	Gold	Silver	Bronze
1997	Serguei Avdyeyev	Ruslan Pidhornyy	Volodymir Gustov
1998	Serhiy Honchar	Yuriy Krivtsov	Serguei Avdyeyev
1999	Sergiy Matveyev	Stanislav Nefedov	Andrei Yatsenko
2000	Serhiy Honchar	Oleksandr Klymenko	Olexander Dykiy
2001	Serhiy Honchar	Oleksandr Klymenko	Yuriy Krivtsov
2002	Serhiy Honchar	Bogdan Bondariew	Sergiy Matveyev
2003	Sergiy Matveyev	Serhiy Honchar	Yuriy Krivtsov
2004	Yuriy Krivtsov	Sergiy Matveyev	Serhiy Honchar
2005	Andriy Hrivko	Sergiy Matveyev	Volodymyr Bileka
2006	Andriy Hrivko	Yuriy Krivtsov	Volodymyr Bileka
2007	Volodymyr Dyudya	Sergiy Matveyev	Dmytro Grabovskyy
2008	Andriy Hrivko	Sergiy Matveyev	Denys Kostyuk
2009	Andriy Hrivko	Dmytro Grabovskyy	Oleksandr Kvachuk
2010	Vitaly Popkov	Yuriy Krivtsov	Andriy Vasylyuk
2011	Oleksandr Kvachuk	Oleg Chuzhda	Volodymyr Bileka
2012	Andriy Hrivko	Mykhaylo Kononenko	Sergiy Lagkuti
2013	Andriy Vasylyuk	Andriy Hrivko	Mykhaylo Kononenko
2014	Andriy Vasylyuk	Mykhaylo Kononenko	Volodymyr Kogut
2015	Sergiy Lagkuti	Andriy Khripta	Andriy Vasylyuk
2016	Andriy Vasylyuk	Andriy Khripta	Oleksandr Prevar
2017	Oleksandr Polivoda	Andriy Vasylyuk	Oleksandr Prevar
2018	Andriy Hrivko	Mykhaylo Kononenko	Oleksandr Golovash
2019	Mark Padun	Andriy Vasylyuk	Oleksandr Golovash
2020	Mykhaylo Kononenko	Oleksandr Golovash	Andriy Vasylyuk
2021	Mykhaylo Kononenko	Oleksandr Golovash	Vitaliy Hryniv
2022	Not held due to the 2022 Russian invasion of Ukraine		
2023	Vitalii Novakowskyi	Vladyslav Shcherban	Vitaliy Hryniv
2024	Vitaliy Hryniv	Daniil Yakovlev	Yaroslav Kozakov
2025	Anatolii Budiak	Semen Simon	Vitaliy Hryniv

=== U23 ===
Year	Gold	Silver	Bronze
2006	Oleksandr Surutkovych	Dmytro Grabovskyy	Maxim Polischuk
2009	Mykhaylo Kononenko	Oleksandr Grygorenko	Nikolay Onysechko
2011	Oleksandr Golovash	Maksym Vasilyev	Artem Topchanyuk
2012	Oleksandr Golovash	Oleksandr Lobov	Andrii Orlov
2013	Oleksandr Golovash	Marlen Zmorka	Sergiy Shymilov
2014	Volodymyr Fredyuk	Vitaliy Hryniv	Marlen Zmorka
2015	Marlen Zmorka	Volodymyr Dzhus	Mark Padun
2016	Mark Padun	Konstantin Ribaruk	Iliya Klepikov
2017	Timur Malieiev	Victor Shevtsov	Vladyslav Soltasiuk
2018	Victor Shevtsov	Timur Malieiev	Vitalii Novakowskyi
2019	Vladyslav Soltasiuk	Vladislav Zubar	Kirilo Tsarenko
2020	Kirilo Tsarenko	Maksim Bilyi	Oleksandr Shevchenko
2021	Kirilo Tsarenko	Mykyta Yakovlev	Daniil Nikulin
2022	Not held due to the 2022 Russian invasion of Ukraine		
2023	Dmytro Polupan	Valentyn Kabashnyi	Tymofii Predko
2024	Semen Simon	Matvey Ushakov	Mykola Hovorun
2025	Danylo Kozoriz	Heorhii Chyzhykov	Yevhen Testsov

== Women ==
Year	Gold	Silver	Bronze
1995	Elena Tchalykh	Tamara Polyakova	Natalja Kistchuk
1996	Tamara Polyakova	Valentyna Karpenko	Ljudmyla Bavykina
1997	Valentyna Karpenko	Olena Budovitska	Tamara Polyakova
1998	Tamara Polyakova	Valentyna Karpenko	Yulia Murenkaia
1999	Yulia Murenkaia	Valentyna Karpenko	Olena Budovitska
2000	Valentyna Karpenko	Natalja Kachalka	Tamara Polyakova
2001	Tatiana Andriutchenko	Tetyana Styazhkina	Iryna Chuzhynova-Denisiuk
2002	Tetyana Styazhkina	Tatiana Andriutchenko	Natalja Kachalka
2005	Iryna Shpylyova	Kateryna Krasova	
2006	Iryna Shpylyova	Tetyana Styazhkina	Kateryna Krasova
2007	Lesya Kalytovska	Svitlana Halyuk	Yelizaveta Bochkaryova
2008	Tetyana Styazhkina	Lesya Kalytovska	Yevheniya Vysotska
2009	Yevheniya Vysotska	Iryna Shpylyova	Olena Sharha
2010	Hanna Solovey	Svitlana Halyuk	Yevheniya Vysotska
2011	Svitlana Halyuk (Note: Hanna Solovey, the original winner, was disqualified for doping.)	Yelizaveta Bochkaryova	Olena Pavlukhina
2012	Anna Nahirna	Olena Pavlukhina	Yevheniya Vysotska
2013	Valeriya Kononenko	Ivanna Borovichenko	Olena Sharha
2014	Tetyana Ryabchenko	Valeriya Kononenko	Inna Metalnikova
2015	Hanna Solovey	Tetyana Ryabchenko	Olena Sharha
2016	Yevheniya Vysotska	Hanna Solovey	Tetyana Ryabchenko
2017	Valeriya Kononenko	Olena Sharha	Olga Shekel
2018	Yevheniya Vysotska	Hanna Solovey	Tetyana Ryabchenko
2019	Valeriya Kononenko	Tetyana Ryabchenko	Olga Shekel
2020	Olga Shekel	Valeriya Kononenko	Yevheniya Vysotska
2021	Valeriya Kononenko	Hanna Solovey	Olga Shekel
2022	Not held due to the 2022 Russian invasion of Ukraine		
2023	Valeriya Kononenko	Yuliia Biriukova	Olha Kulynych
2024	Yuliia Biriukova	Valeriya Kononenko	Tetiana Yashchenko
2025	Yuliia Biriukova	Olha Kulynych	Olga Shekel

== See also ==
- Ukrainian National Road Race Championships
- National Road Cycling Championships
