= 2016 Tour of Croatia =

2016 UCI Europe Tour
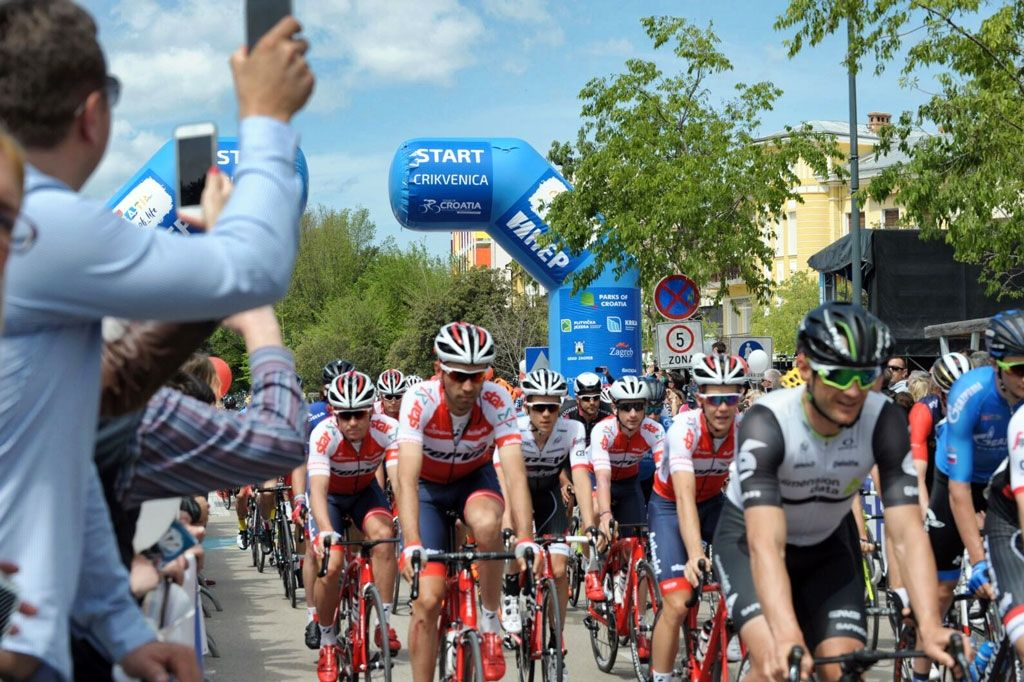
- Start of the race in Crikvenica

Race details
- Dates: 19–24 April 2016
- Stages: 6
- Distance: 1,004.8 km (624.4 mi)
- Winning time: 23h 29' 29"

Results
Jersey awarded to the overall winner	Winner	Matija Kvasina (CRO)	(Synergy Baku)
	Second	Jesper Hansen (DEN)	(Tinkoff)
	Third	Víctor de la Parte (ESP)	(CCC–Sprandi–Polkowice)
Jersey awarded to the points classification winner	Points	Giacomo Nizzolo (ITA)	(Trek–Segafredo)
Jersey awarded to the mountains classification winner	Mountains	Riccardo Zoidl (AUT)	(Trek–Segafredo)
Jersey awarded to the young rider classification winner	Young rider	Domen Novak (SLO)	(Adria Mobil)
	Team	(Azerbaijan) Synergy Baku	

The 2016 Tour of Croatia was the 2nd edition of the Tour of Croatia cycling stage race. The race started on 19 April in Osijek and ended on 24 April in Zagreb and consisted of six stages. The race is part of the 2016 UCI Europe Tour, and is rated as a 2.1 event.

The race has been won by Synergy Baku Cycling Project's Croatian rider Matija Kvasina, who took the leader's jersey after winning the fourth stage. Giacomo Nizzolo claimed the Points classification, Riccardo Zoidl won the Mountains classification, and Domen Novak finished first in the Young Rider classification Synergy Baku Cycling Project won the Teams classification.

== Schedule ==
Stage characteristics and winners
Stage	Date	Course	Distance	Type	Winner
1	19 April	Osijek to Varaždin	235.1 km (146 mi)	Flat stage	Giacomo Nizzolo (ITA)
2	20 April	NP Plitvice Lakes to Split	240 km (149 mi)	Intermediate stage	Mark Cavendish (GBR)
3	21 April	Makarska to Šibenik	189.8 km (118 mi)	Hilly stage	Giacomo Nizzolo (ITA)
4	22 April	Crikvenica to Učka	122.1 km (76 mi)	Mountain stage	Riccardo Zoidl (AUT)
5	23 April	Poreč to Umag	40.3 km (25 mi)	Team time trial	Tinkoff
6	24 April	Sveti Martin na Muri to Zagreb	177.5 km (110 mi)	Hilly stage	Sondre Holst Enger (NOR)
Total		1,004.8 km (624.4 mi)			

== Participating teams ==
Twenty-one (21) teams participated in the 2016 edition of the Tour of Croatia.

UCI WorldTeams (18/5)

- Astana
- Team Dimension Data
- IAM Cycling
- Tinkoff
- Trek–Segafredo

UCI Professional Continental teams

- Androni Giocattoli–Sidermec
- Bardiani–CSF
- CCC–Sprandi–Polkowice
- Gazprom–RusVelo
- ONE Pro Cycling
- Team Novo Nordisk
- Verva ActiveJet

UCI Continental teams

- Adria Mobil
- Synergy Baku
- Meridiana–Kamen
- Radenska–Ljubljana
- Cyclingteam Join-S–De Rijke
- Team Felbermayr–Simplon Wels
- Verandas Willems
- WIGGINS
- Cycling Academy

== Classification leadership ==
Stage	Winner	General classification Crvena majica	Points classification Plava majica	Mountains classification Zelena majica	Young rider classification Bijela majica	Team classification
1	Giacomo Nizzolo	Giacomo Nizzolo	Giacomo Nizzolo	Guillaume Boivin	Alexey Kurbatov	Synergy Baku
2	Mark Cavendish	Mark Cavendish	Mark Cavendish	Nicola Boem	Alexey Kurbatov	Synergy Baku
3	Giacomo Nizzolo	Giacomo Nizzolo	Giacomo Nizzolo	Nicola Boem	Alexey Kurbatov	Gazprom–RusVelo
4	Riccardo Zoidl	Matija Kvasina	Giacomo Nizzolo	Riccardo Zoidl	Domen Novak	Synergy Baku
5	Tinkoff	Matija Kvasina	Giacomo Nizzolo	Riccardo Zoidl	Domen Novak	Synergy Baku
6	Sondre Holst Enger	Matija Kvasina	Giacomo Nizzolo	Riccardo Zoidl	Domen Novak	Synergy Baku
Final		Matija Kvasina	Giacomo Nizzolo	Riccardo Zoidl	Domen Novak	Synergy Baku

== Final standings ==
Legend
General classification	Denotes the leader of the General classification	Points classification	Denotes the leader of the Points classification
Mountains classification	Denotes the leader of the Mountains classification	Young rider classification	Denotes the leader of the Young rider classification

=== General classification ===
	Rider	Team	Time
1	Matija Kvasina (CRO)	Synergy Baku	23h 29' 29"
2	Jesper Hansen (DEN)	Tinkoff	+ 24"
3	Víctor de la Parte (ESP)	CCC–Sprandi–Polkowice	+ 32"
4	Felix Großschartner (AUT)	CCC–Sprandi–Polkowice	+ 47"
5	Radoslav Rogina (CRO)	Adria Mobil	+ 1' 16"
6	Domen Novak (SLO)	Adria Mobil	+ 1' 47"
7	Kirill Pozdnyakov (RUS)	Synergy Baku	+ 2' 19"
8	Markus Eibegger (AUT)	Team Felbermayr–Simplon Wels	+ 3' 26"
9	Scott Davies (GBR)	WIGGINS	+ 3' 28"
10	Riccardo Zoidl (AUT)	Trek–Segafredo	+ 3' 50"

=== Points classification ===
	Rider	Team	Points
1	Giacomo Nizzolo (ITA)	Trek–Segafredo	70
2	Mark Cavendish (GBR)	Team Dimension Data	64
3	Timothy Dupont (BEL)	Verandas Willems	59
4	Nicola Ruffoni (ITA)	Bardiani–CSF	35
5	Sondre Holst Enger (NOR)	IAM Cycling	26
6	Riccardo Zoidl (AUT)	Trek–Segafredo	25
7	Coen Vermeltfoort (NED)	Cyclingteam Join-S–De Rijke	25
8	Markus Eibegger (AUT)	Team Felbermayr–Simplon Wels	24
9	Edward Theuns (BEL)	Trek–Segafredo	22
10	Matija Kvasina (CRO)	Synergy Baku	20

=== Mountains classification ===
	Rider	Team	Points
1	Riccardo Zoidl (AUT)	Trek–Segafredo	20
2	Nicola Boem (ITA)	Bardiani–CSF	20
3	Artem Ovechkin (RUS)	Gazprom–RusVelo	19
4	Matija Kvasina (CRO)	Synergy Baku	15
5	Víctor de la Parte (ESP)	CCC–Sprandi–Polkowice	10
6	Jesper Hansen (DEN)	Tinkoff	8
7	Alessandro Tonelli (ITA)	Bardiani–CSF	8
8	Kevin De Mesmaeker (BEL)	Team Novo Nordisk	7
9	Radoslav Rogina (CRO)	Adria Mobil	6
10	Scott Davies (GBR)	WIGGINS	6

=== Young riders classification ===
	Rider	Team	Time
1	Domen Novak (SLO)	Adria Mobil	23h 31' 16"
2	Scott Davies (GBR)	WIGGINS	+ 1' 51"
3	Daniel Pearson (GBR)	WIGGINS	+ 3' 14"
4	Izidor Penko (SLO)	Radenska–Ljubljana	+ 12' 10"
5	Bruno Maltar (CRO)	Radenska–Ljubljana	+ 16' 13"
6	Žiga Ručigaj (SLO)	Radenska–Ljubljana	+ 16' 26"
7	Aydar Zakarin (RUS)	Gazprom–RusVelo	+ 20' 26"
8	Alexey Kurbatov (RUS)	Gazprom–RusVelo	+ 23' 17"

=== Team classification ===
	Team	Time
1	Synergy Baku	68h 55' 59"
2	Adria Mobil	+ 4' 15"
3	CCC–Sprandi–Polkowice	+ 7' 10"
4	WIGGINS	+ 7' 29"
5	Tinkoff	+ 9' 56"
6	ONE Pro Cycling	+ 14' 41"
7	Meridiana–Kamen	+ 15' 26"
8	Trek–Segafredo	+ 15' 45"
9	Bardiani–CSF	+ 18' 40"
10	Cycling Academy	+ 20' 02"
