= Oleksandr Klymenko (cyclist) =

Ukrainian cyclist

Personal information
- Born: 19 December 1975 (age 50)

Cycling career
- Sport: Cycling
- Current team: Retired
- Discipline: Road
- Role: Rider

Professional teams
- 2001: Mikomax–Browar Staropolski
- 2002–2004: Mróz–Supradyn Witaminy
- 2005: Grupa PSB
- 2006: Arda Natura–Pinarello

Oleksandr Klymenko (born 19 December 1975) is a Ukrainian former cyclist.

== Major results ==
2000
2nd National Time Trial Championships
2001
2nd National Time Trial Championships
2002
1st National Road Race Championships
1st Overall Tour of Japan

1st Stage 3

1st Overall Bałtyk–Karkonosze Tour

1st Stage 5

2003
1st Overall Bałtyk–Karkonosze Tour

1st Stage 7

3rd Overall Course de la Solidarité Olympique
2004
3rd Overall Bałtyk–Karkonosze Tour
2005
1st Grand Prix Palma
2006
3rd Tour de Ribas
