= Volodymyr Bileka =

Ukrainian cyclist (born 1979)

Personal information
- Full name: Volodymyr Bileka; Володимир Білека
- Born: 6 February 1979 (age 47) Drohobych, Ukraine
- Height: 1.70 m (5 ft 7 in)
- Weight: 65 kg (143 lb)

Cycling career
- Sport: Cycling
- Discipline: Road
- Role: Rider

Professional teams
- 2002–2004: Landbouwkrediet–Colnago
- 2005–2007: Discovery Channel
- 2008: Silence–Lotto
- 2010–2011: Amore & Vita–Conad
- 2012: Konya–Torku Şekerspor

Volodymyr Bileka (Ukrainian: Володимир Білека, born 6 February 1979 in Drohobych) is a Ukrainian professional road bicycle racer. He rode for Discovery Channel between 2005 and 2007. As with teammate and compatriot Yaroslav Popovych, he showed promise by winning numerous races as a junior before turning professional.

== Doping cases ==
On 3 May 2008 Bileka sent a letter to Silence–Lotto team management announcing his resignation from the team for personal reasons, later revealed to be a positive test for EPO that resulted in a two-year ban. He made a comeback in professional cycling in 2010, riding for lower ranked teams. In 2012, while riding for Torku Şeker Spor, he tested positive for pseudoephedrine at the first stage of Tour of Trakya. He is now under a four-year-long suspension that will end 1 July 2016.

== Major results ==
2001
1st Stage 6 Thüringen Rundfahrt
2nd Paris–Roubaix Espoirs
2002
1st Poreč Trophy 1
2nd Poreč Trophy 2
9th GP Chiasso
2004
10th Coppa Bernocchi
2005
3rd Overall Circuit de la Sarthe
9th Overall Volta ao Algarve
3rd Time trial, National Road Championships
2006
3rd Time trial, National Road Championships
2007
5th Overall Driedaagse van West Vlaanderen
2010
10th Overall Tour of Hainan
2011
1st Trophée de l'Anniversaire, Challenge du Prince
3rd Time trial, National Road Championships
8th Trophée Princier, Challenge du Prince
2012
4th Time trial, National Road Championships
5th Overall Azerbaïjan Tour
5th Overall Istrian Spring Trophy
5th GP Sakia El Hamra, Les Challenges de la Marche Verte
6th Overall Tour du Maroc

1st Mountains classification

6th Poreč Trophy
