= Maksym Averin =

Ukrainian-born Azerbaijani cyclist

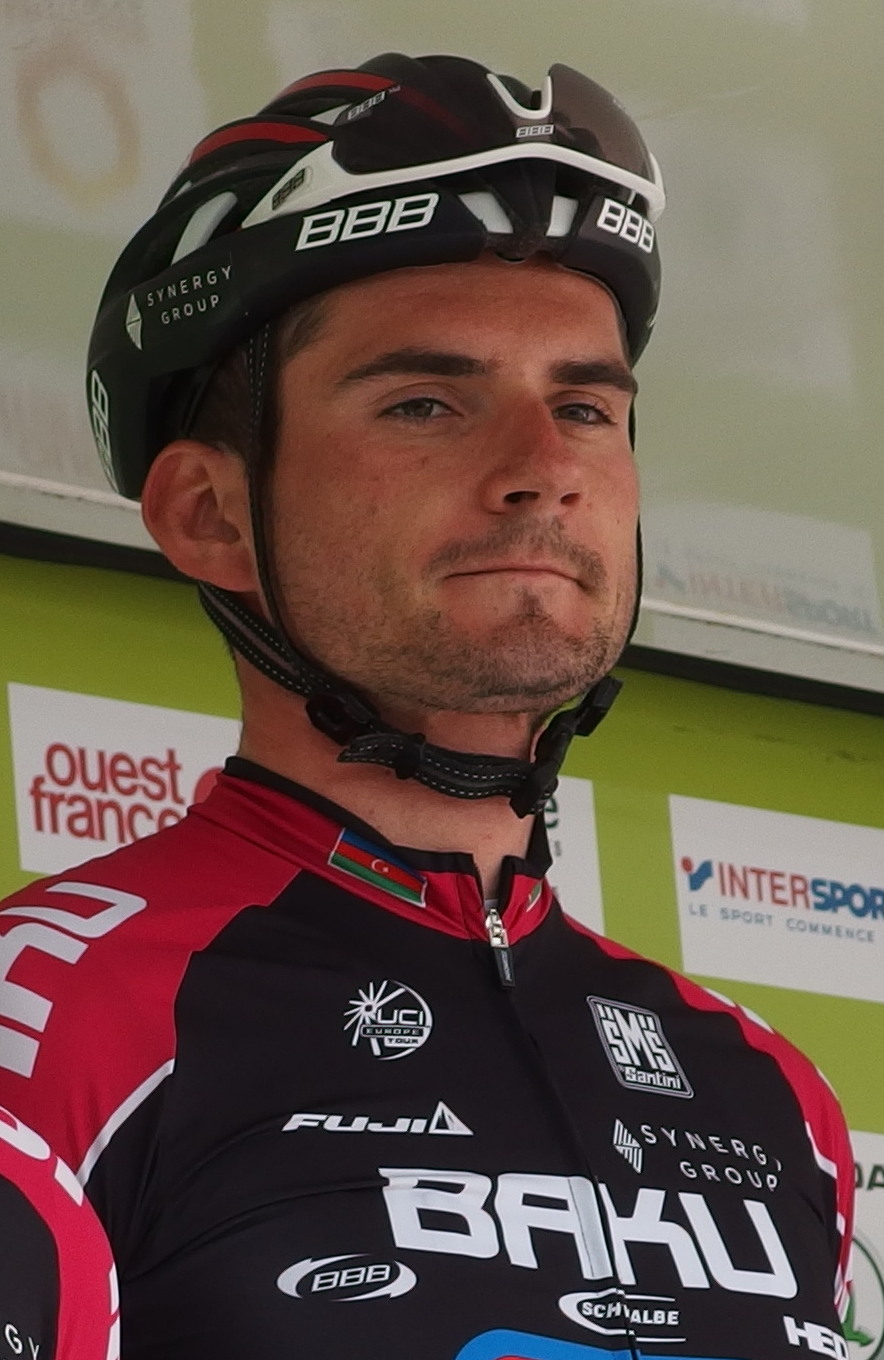
- Averin in 2014

Personal information
- Full name: Maksym Averin
- Born: 28 November 1985 (age 40): Lviv, Ukrainian SSR, Soviet Union; (now Ukraine)

Cycling career
- Sport: Cycling
- Current team: Retired
- Discipline: Road
- Role: Rider
- Rider type: Sprinter

Amateur team
- 2010: Palazzago Elledent Rad

Professional teams
- 2004: Lokomotiv
- 2012: Amore & Vita
- 2013: Atlas Personal–Jakroo
- 2014–2017: Synergy Baku

Maksym Averin (born 28 November 1985) is a Ukrainian-born Azerbaijani former professional cyclist, who rode professionally in 2004 and from 2012 to 2017, for the Lokomotiv, Amore & Vita, Atlas Personal–Jakroo and Synergy Baku teams. In May 2017, Averin was given a backdated 15-month ban, having tested positive for meldonium the previous December.

== Personal life ==
His father Aleksandr Averin also competed professionally as a cyclist.

== Major results ==
2002
3rd Team pursuit, UEC European Junior Track Championships
2011
2nd Trofeo Edil C
3rd Coppa della Pace
10th Circuito del Porto
2013
1st Stage 4 Tour of China I
2014
1st Poreč Trophy
2015
National Road Championships

1st Road race
1st Time trial

1st Stage 2 Okolo Slovenska
2nd Trofej Umag
3rd Poreč Trophy
5th Duo Normand (with Ioannis Tamouridis)
5th GP Izola
7th Overall Tour d'Azerbaïdjan

1st Azerbaijan rider classification

7th Croatia–Slovenia
8th Odessa Grand Prix I
10th GP Laguna
2016
National Road Championships

1st Road race
2nd Time trial

1st Stage 2 Tour d'Azerbaïdjan
