= 2010 Three Days of De Panne =

Race details
- Dates: 30 March–1 April 2010
- Stages: 3
- Distance: 512.75 km (318.61 mi)
- Winning time: 12h 20' 36"

Results
| | Winner | David Millar (GBR) |
| | Second | Andriy Hrivko (UKR) |
| | Third | Luca Paolini (ITA) |

The 2010 Three Days of De Panne was the 34th edition of the Three Days of De Panne cycle race and was held from 30 March to 1 April 2010. The race started in Middelkerke and finished in De Panne. The race was won by David Millar.

== General classification ==
Final general classification

| Rank | Rider | Time |
|---|---|---|
| 1 | David Millar (GBR) | 12h 20' 36" |
| 2 | Andriy Hrivko (UKR) | + 35" |
| 3 | Luca Paolini (ITA) | + 1' 07" |
| 4 | Frédéric Amorison (BEL) | + 1' 25" |
| 5 | Lieuwe Westra (NED) | + 2' 16" |
| 6 | Jens Mouris (NED) | + 2' 26" |
| 7 | Hayden Roulston (NZL) | + 2' 44" |
| 8 | Sébastien Turgot (FRA) | + 2' 45" |
| 9 | Nikolay Trusov (RUS) | + 2' 58" |
| 10 | Manuel Quinziato (ITA) | + 2' 59" |
