= Olha Kulynych =

Ukrainian cyclist (born 2000)

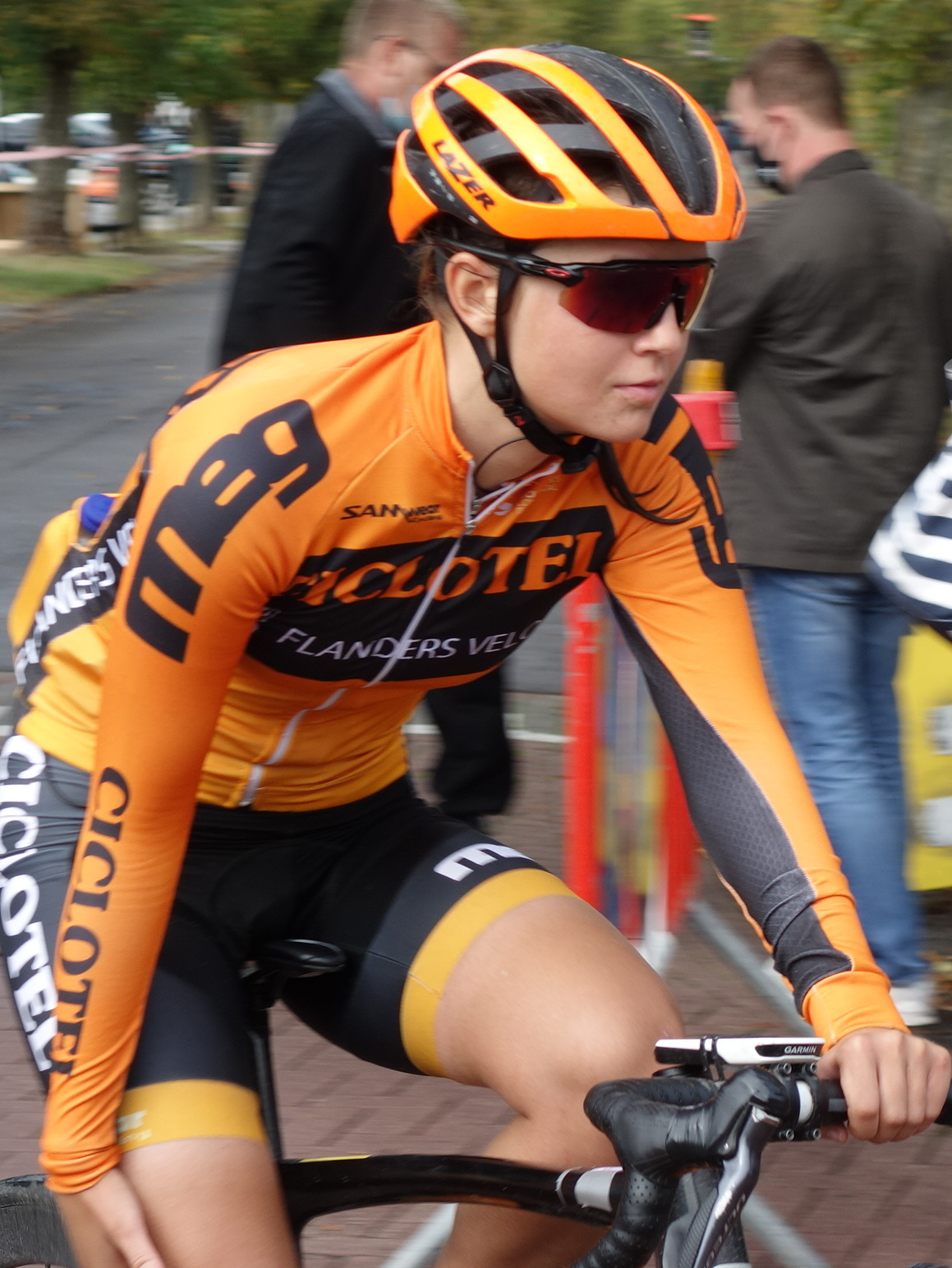
- Kulynych in 2020

Personal information
- Full name: Olha Kulynych
- Born: 1 February 2000 (age 26) Bila Tserkva
- Height: 1.64 m (5 ft 5 in)
- Weight: 48 kg (106 lb)

Cycling career
- Sport: Cycling
- Current team: Doltcini–Van Eyck–Proximus
- Disciplines: Road; Track
- Role: Rider

Amateur teams
- 2018: YRDP
- 2019: Torelli–Kuota–Brother

Professional teams
- 2020: Ciclotel
- 2021–: Doltcini–Van Eyck–Proximus

Olha Kulynych (born 1 February 2000) is a Ukrainian professional racing cyclist, who currently rides for UCI Women's Continental Team Doltcini–Van Eyck–Proximus. In October 2020, she rode in the women's edition of the 2020 Liège–Bastogne–Liège race in Belgium.

== Major results ==
2017
National Junior Road Championships

1st Time trial
1st Road race

2018
National Junior Road Championships

1st Time trial
1st Road race

UEC European Junior Championships

7th Time trial
8th Road race

2019
1st Road race, National Under-23 Road Championships
4th VR Women ITT
10th Kiev Olimpic Ring Women Race
2020
1st GP Belek
2nd Time trial, National Under-23 Road Championships
2nd Grand Prix Cappadocia
4th Grand Prix Develi
6th Grand Prix World's Best High Altitude
2021
3rd Time trial, National Under-23 Road Championships
6th Grand Prix Kayseri
7th Road race, National Road Championships
9th Grand Prix Develi
2023
1st Overall Tour de Feminin
2nd Overall Trofeo Ponente in Rosa
1st Stage 4 Giro della Toscana Int. Femminile – Memorial Michela Fanini
National Road Championships

3rd Time trial
3rd Road race

5th Leiedal Koerse
8th Team relay, UEC European Road Championships
10th Districtenpijl - Ekeren-Deurne
