= Olena Pavlukhina =

Azerbaijani cyclist

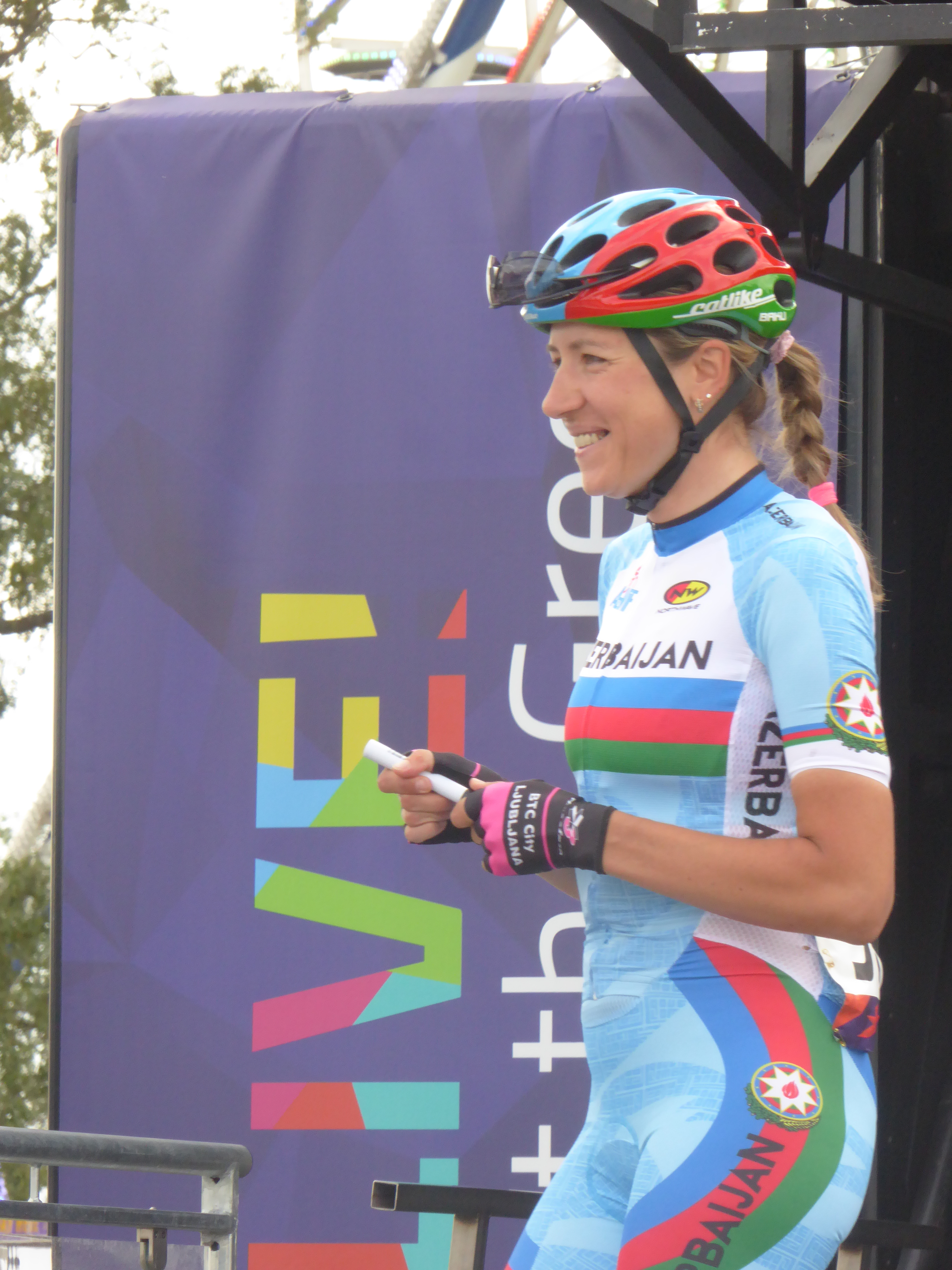
- Pavlukhina at the 2018 European Road Cycling Championships.

Personal information
- Full name: Olena Kozakova Pavlukhina
- Born: 1 March 1989 (age 37): Horlivka, Ukrainian SSR; (now Ukraine)
- Height: 1.78 m (5 ft 10 in)
- Weight: 68 kg (150 lb)

Cycling career
- Sport: Cycling
- Current team: Suspended
- Disciplines: Road; Track
- Role: Rider
- Rider type: Time trialist

Professional teams
- 2015–2016: BTC City Ljubljana
- 2017: Astana
- 2018: BTC City Ljubljana

Major wins
- Azerbaijani National Time Trial Championships (2015, 2016); Azerbaijani National Road Race Championships (2015, 2016)

Olena Kozakova Pavlukhina (born 1 March 1989) is a Ukrainian-born Azerbaijani road and track cyclist. She served a four-year suspension from the sport following an anti-doping rule violation.

She participated at the 2011 UCI Road World Championships and 2012 UCI Road World Championships. In 2015, she won the Azerbaijani National Road Race Championships, the Azerbaijani National Time Trial Championships, and finished sixth at the inaugural European Games time trial. In 2016, she won the second stage and overall of Gracia–Orlová.

She was in 35th place at the Olympic Games WE - Road Race 2016 One day race Rio de Janeiro (136.9km)

== Major results ==
2007
9th Time trial, UCI Juniors World Championships
9th Time trial, UEC European Junior Road Championships
2012
2nd Time trial, Ukrainian National Road Championships
8th Overall Gracia-Orlová
2014
Grand Prix Galichyna

1st Points race
3rd Scratch

3rd Scratch, Fenioux Trophy Piste
2015
Azerbaijani National Road Championships

1st Road race
1st Time trial

2nd Scratch, Grand Prix Galichyna
5th Chrono des Nations
6th Time trial, European Games
2016
Azerbaijani National Road Championships

1st Road race
1st Time trial

1st Overall Gracia–Orlová

1st Stage 2

4th Overall Tour of Zhoushan Island
9th Time trial, UEC European Road Championships
9th Overall Tour of Chongming Island
2017
~~Azerbaijani National Road Championships~~

~~1st Road race~~
~~1st Time trial~~

~~8th Ljubljana–Domžale–Ljubljana TT~~
2018
~~Azerbaijani National Road Championships~~

~~1st Road race~~
~~1st Time trial~~
