= Azerbaijan Cycling Federation =

National governing body of cycle racing in Azerbaijan

- Sport: Bicycle racing
- Jurisdiction: National
- Abbreviation: AzVIF
- Affiliation: UCI
- Headquarters: Baku

Official website
- azvif.az
- (Azerbaijan)

The Azerbaijan Cycling Federation (in Azerbaijani: Azərbaycan Velosiped İdmani Federasiyasi) is the national governing body of cycle racing in Azerbaijan. It was founded in 1997 and is a member of the UCI and the UEC.

The federation organizes the Azerbaijani National Road Race Championships and the Tour d'Azerbaïdjan, and hosted the 2018 UCI BMX World Championships. Riders from Azerbaijan have repeatedly competed at the UCI Road World Championships between 2012 and 2020.
