= Valeriya Kononenko =

Ukrainian cyclist (born 1990)

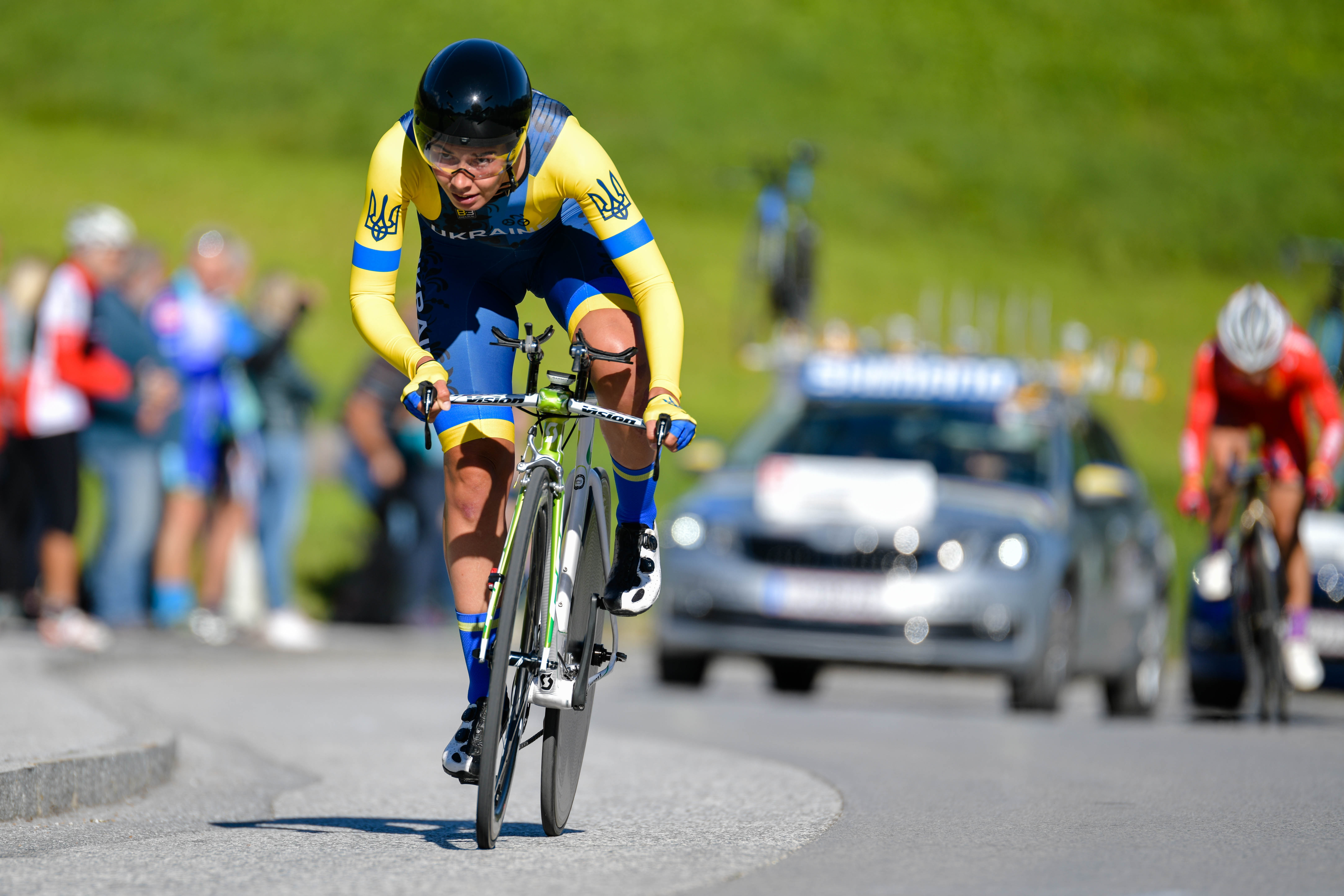
- Kononenko at the 2018 UCI Road World Championships

Personal information
- Full name: Valeriya Kononenko
- Born: 14 May 1990 (age 36)

Cycling career
- Sport: Cycling
- Discipline: Road
- Role: Rider

Amateur team
- 2023: Dubai Police Cycling Team

Professional teams
- 2017: S.C. Michela Fanini Rox
- 2019: Lviv Cycling Team
- 2020: Ciclotel
- 2021: Colnago CM Team

Valeriya Kononenko (born 14 May 1990) is a Ukrainian racing cyclist. She competed in the 2013 UCI women's time trial in Florence.

== Major results ==
2007
1st Time trial, UEC European Junior Road Championships
2nd Time trial, UCI Junior Road World Championships
2008
UEC European Junior Road Championships

1st Time trial
2nd Road race

2nd Time trial, UCI Junior Road World Championships
2009
7th Time trial, UEC European Under-23 Road Championships
10th Open de Suède Vårgårda TTT
2010
9th Open de Suède Vårgårda TTT
2012
5th Time trial, National Road Championships
2013
1st Time trial, National Road Championships
2014
National Road Championships

2nd Road race
2nd Time trial

3rd Points race, Copa Internacional de Pista
2015
5th Time trial, National Road Championships
2016
1st VR Women ITT
4th Horizon Park Women Challenge
5th Gran Prix San Luis Femenino
2017
3rd VR Women ITT
5th Time trial, National Road Championships
2018
National Road Championships

1st Time trial
3rd Road race

2nd VR Women ITT
5th Horizon Park Women Challenge
2019
National Road Championships

1st Time trial
2nd Road race

1st VR Women ITT
4th Overall The Princess Maha Chackri Sirindhorn's Cup "Women's Tour of Thailand"
5th V4 Ladies Series-Restart Zalaegerszeg
6th Kievskaya Sotka Women Challenge
7th Grand Prix Alanya WE
9th Overall Tour of Chongming Island UCI Women's WorldTour
2020
1st Grand Prix Cappadocia WE
1st Grand Prix Velo Erciyes WE
2nd Grand Prix Central Anatolia WE
2nd Grand Prix Mount Erciyes 2200 mt WE
National Road Championships

2nd Time trial
4th Road race

7th Grand Prix World's Best High Altitude WE
2021
National Road Championships

1st Time trial
2nd Road race

4th Grand Prix Mediterrennean WE
5th Grand Prix Erciyes - Mimar Sinan WE
6th Time trial, UEC European Road Championships
7th Kahramanmaraş Grand Prix Road Race WE
2022
2nd Chrono des Nations
8th Overall Giro della Toscana Int. Femminile – Memorial Michela Fanini
2023
National Road Championships

1st Time trial
5th Road race

1st Overall Princess Anna Vasa Tour

1st Stage 3 (ITT)

2024
National Road Championships

2nd Time trial
3rd Road race

5th Grand Prix MOPT
