= Tour d'Azerbaïdjan =

Azerbaijani multi-day road cycling race

- 2026 Baku-Khankendi Azerbaijan Cycling Race

Race details
- Date: May
- Region: Azerbaijan
- Local name: Tour d'Azerbaïdjan
- Discipline: Road
- Competition: Professional
- Type: UCI Europe Tour
- Organiser: Azerbaijan Cycling Federation, Union Cycliste Internationale, Ministry of Youth and Sports of Azerbaijan, National Olympic Committee of Azerbaijan
- Web site: bakukhankendi.az

History
- First edition: 2012
- Editions: 7 (as of 2026)
- First winner: Youcef Reguigui (ALG)
- Most wins: No repeat winners
- Most recent: Josh Burnett (NZL)

Tour d'Azerbaïdjan is a multi-stage bicycle race. It is part of the UCI Europe Tour categorized as 2.1, which took place in Azerbaijan around May. Each day, participants started on a new phase of the race. The race was held in 7 regions of Azerbaijan and finished in the capital, Baku. Other large cities the race moved through were Oguz, Chamakh, Maraza, Ismayilli, Gabala, Sheki.

The race were held as Tour d'Azerbaïdjan between 2012 and 2017, after which it was not held. in 2025, it was announced that the race would be resumed in the 2026 UCI Europe Tour, with a new name Baku-Khankendi Azerbaijan Cycling Race.

== 2012 tour ==
From 9 to 13 May 2012 the international cycling tour in memory of Heydar Aliyev was held. The tournament was a logical continuation of the last year's event, "Big Caucasus". But unlike its predecessor, it consisted of five stages, and became the first professional cycle event in the history of independent Azerbaijan. The competitions were held under the auspices of the UCI category 2.2 U23 (for athletes under 23 years old).

In general, the race was attended by 180 cyclists, 16 of whom were women. There were 4 national, 4 continental and 12 club teams, 6 cyclists in each. About fifty members of the support staff accompanied the athletes during the race. Male cyclists competed in individual and team competition, women were competing in personal race.

International cycling tour in memory of the national leader Heydar Aliyev started from square Azadlig (Freedom Square) in Baku.

Women Cycling

The first day of the event included a bicycle race for women. Each female cyclist made it to 25 kilometres (16 miles). Elena Chalykh from Azerbaijan won the competition. Elena Chalykh, who won the license for the Olympic Games in London, crossed the finish line after making a distance within 34 minutes 57 seconds.

Stage 1

At the first stage the race was held between the 18 men's teams competed in the 30-kilometre (19-mile) distance. Russian club Itera–Katusha won, reaching the finish line in 36 minutes 38 seconds. The Kazakh national team was the second to finish, while the German club «Specialized Concept Store» took third place.

Stage 2

On May 10, in the second phase of the tour, cyclists completed a 176-kilometre (109-mile) distance along the route of the Baku-Ismailly, which included three mountain top peaks on the tops of the Greater Caucasus. The winner of stage 2 was the Spanish cyclist Diego Rubio. The first-place winner coped with the distance in 4 hours 41 minutes and 39 seconds. Youcef Reguigui was the leader in the overall standings after the second stage.

Stage 3

Stage 3 started in Gabala with a flat section of 20 kilometres (12 miles). Then the riders moved to the highlands, to the cities of Sheki and Oguz. In general, leaving behind a difficult 160-kilometre (99-mile) distance, the competitors finished in Gabala. Dmitry Vernidub took first place on the third stage of the international cycle tour. The leader of the standings Youcef Reguigui finished right behind the winner with the distance difference of 1 metre (3 feet 3 inches). The third to the line was a Ukrainian Maksym Vasilyev, immediately followed by the winner of the 2nd stage Diego Rubio.

Stage 4

Stage 4 started at Ismailly, then the peloton rode back to Gabala. The highest point of the tour was reached during the stage, at a height of 798 metres (2,618 feet). In general, at this stage, the riders covered the distance of 114 kilometres (71 miles). Gennady Tatarinov, a cyclist from the Russian team, won the stage. He managed to overcome the distance in 2 hours 41 minutes and 18 seconds. Maksym Vasilyev took 2nd place, while Tilegen Maidos from Kazakhstan occupied the third place. Youcef Reguigui maintained his leadership in the overall standings.

Step 5

Participants returned to Baku in order to kick-start the final phase of the competition. For the last stage of the race the cyclists rode 10 laps through the central streets of Baku before they finished. Nurbolat Kulimbetov from Kazakhstan took first place on the stage, completing the distance in 2 hours 57 minutes and 16 seconds. Gennady Tatarinov, the winner of the previous stage, occupied the second place. Issiaka Cissé from Côte d'Ivoire was the third to cross the finish line.

Winners

Youcef Reguigui who held the leadership in the overall standings from the second stage, remained confident in his position, winning the blue jersey. Maksym Vasilyev, gaining maximum points, received the green jersey of the best sprinter, and Bakhtiyar Kozhatayev became a winner of the mountain category.

In the team competition the first place was taken by the Russian team Itera–Katusha (43:51:04), World Cycling Centre were second (43:51:20), and Ukrainians ISD–Lampre Continental third (43:52:50).

Pat McQuaid, president of the UCI, expressed a warm welcome and congratulations to the winners, adding that the competition was held at the highest level, in compliance with all international standards. Bicycle Federation of Azerbaijan has made big effort to carry out such an important international event on a high level and in accordance with all international requirements.

== 2013 tour ==
The Tour d'Azerbaïdjan started in Baku by the Heydar Aliyev Foundation. After completing 11 laps for a distance of 157 kilometres (98 miles), the participants finished in front of the Foundation. On the second stage, the peloton started from the bike park, located on the shore of the Caspian Sea in Baku, riding towards the Caucasus Mountains. The stage finished in Ismailly, after 183 kilometres (114 miles). For the third stage, the competitors rode from Gabala through Oguz and on to Sheki, before returning to Gabala, after 165 kilometres (103 miles). Stage 4 also started in Gabala, where the peloton rode to Shamakhi and finished after 116 kilometres (72 miles) in Pirguli, near the famous Observatory. The final stage, consisting of 12 laps with a total length of 144 kilometres (89 miles), was held on the central avenues and streets of the capital of Azerbaijan, Baku.

== List of overall winners ==
Year	Country	Rider	Team
2012	Algeria	Youcef Reguigui	Centre Mondial du Cyclisme
2013	Ukraine	Sergiy Grechyn	Torku Şekerspor
2014	Russia	Ilnur Zakarin	RusVelo
2015	Slovenia	Primož Roglič	Adria Mobil
2016	Austria	Markus Eibegger	Team Felbermayr–Simplon Wels
2017	Austria	Hermann Pernsteiner (Note: Kirill Pozdnyakov (Synergy Baku) was the original winner for this race, but after he were sanctioned by UCI for failing doping test in April's Tour du Maroc, he were stripped of his results in this race, and second-placed Pernsteiner was declared the new winner.)	Amplatz–BMC
2018-2025	No race		
2026	New Zealand	Josh Burnett	Burgos Burpellet BH

== See also ==
- Cycling in Azerbaijan
- Tour of Azerbaijan
