= Cycling in Azerbaijan =

The history of cycling in Azerbaijan began in 1930, when bicycles were first imported from Russia.

== History ==
Initially, bikes were popular among pupils and students, and in the 1940s they became widely used by almost the entire population without exception. The same year, the first amateur bicycle race was launched and was held every four years. 10 years later the first professional racers begin to perform in Azerbaijan - Sabzali Museyibov and Zargarli Hussein, who later became a pioneer in the training of professional cyclists in Azerbaijan.

In the second half of the 20th century, female cycling has actively developed – both individual tournaments and mixed tournaments were organized for women. In the same period, a mixed team of cyclists from Baku won several local races, and represented Azerbaijan at the Union and trans-Caucasian races.

At the same time, Azerbaijani cyclists took part in the first foreign competitions. New “stars” were lighted- Alkhas Talybov, Aladdin Shabanov, Vladimir Semergey, Alexander Averin and others have successfully performed in different cycle events. Alkhas Talybov, Aladdin Shabanov in these tournaments were awarded with medals and diplomas. We cannot but mention Aladdin Shabanov, who represented Azerbaijan at the races in more than 50 countries and Europe.

After his retirement, Shabanov organized the Museum of Bicycle and bicycling at the Baku State University. The exhibition was composed of materials relating to the history of cycling and a sport both in Azerbaijan and around the world. Some of the artifacts were exhibited during many international competitions, including World and European championships in cycling. Recently, the museum has celebrated its 40th anniversary.

Since the early 1990s, Azerbaijan held many cycling competitions. The championship of Azerbaijan, district and city championships, were organized for the fans by the best riders. In 1991, in honor of the 850th anniversary of the outstanding Persian poet Nizami Ganjavi a 4000 km cycling race between Saint Petersburg and Ganja was held. There were participants from 26 cities of Russia and Azerbaijan.

In 1997, the construction of a modern sport complex was completed, and the Azerbaijani national cycling federation was founded.

In 2009, the Central Directorate of Youth and Sport in Baku, Azerbaijan, together with the National Cycling Federation organized a championship of Baku road racing.

In 2011 Tour d’Azerbaïdjan, a cycling tour in memory of national leader Heydar Aliyev "Big Caucasus" was organized, and in 2012 - the tour became an annual event, later transformed into Tour d'Azerbaidjan. Assad Fazil Mammadov was elected as the chairman of the Azerbaijan National Cycling Federation.

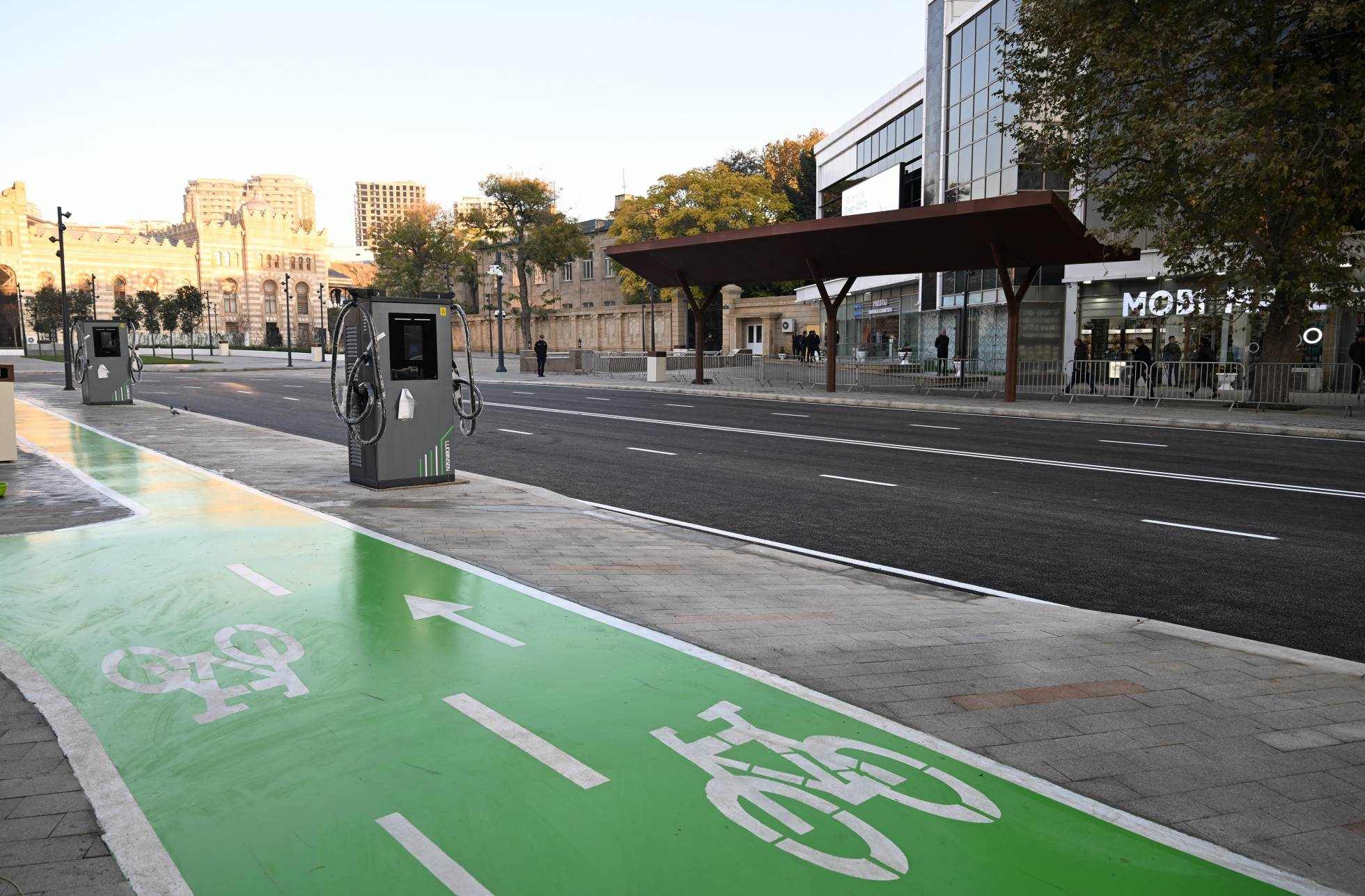
Bikeway in Baku
