= Tour of Mediterrennean =

Turkish cycling tournament

Race details
- Date: March
- Region: Turkey
- Discipline: Road
- Competition: UCI Europe Tour
- Type: Stage race

History
- First edition: 2018
- Editions: 1 (as of 2018)
- First winner: Onur Balkan (TUR)
- Most wins: No repeat winners
- Most recent: Onur Balkan (TUR)

Tour of Mediterrennean is a stage road cycling race held annually in Turkey since 2018. It is part of UCI Europe Tour in category 2.2.

== Winners ==
Year	Country	Rider	Team
2018	Turkey	Onur Balkan	Torku Şekerspor
