= Andriy Hrivko =

Road bicycle racer

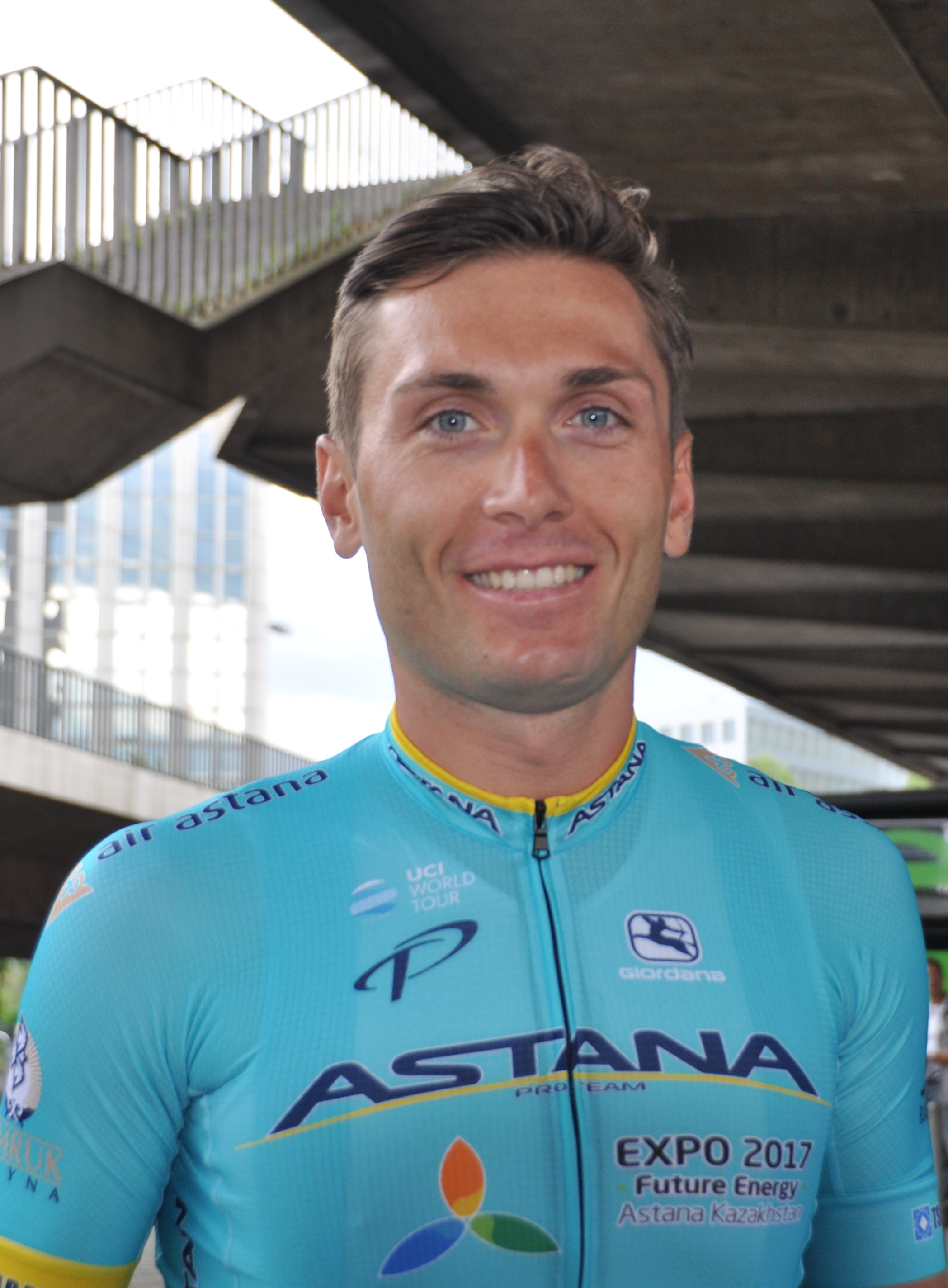
- Hrivko at the 2017 Tour de France

Personal information
- Full name: Andriy Askoldovych Hrivko
- Born: 7 August 1983 (age 43) Zuya, Ukrainian SSR, Soviet Union (now Ukraine)
- Height: 1.80 m (5 ft 11 in)
- Weight: 67 kg (148 lb)

Cycling career
- Sport: Cycling
- Current team: Retired
- Discipline: Road
- Role: Rider
- Rider type: Puncheur; Time-trialist

Professional teams
- 2005: Domina Vacanze
- 2006–2008: Team Milram
- 2009: ISD
- 2010–2018: Astana

Major wins
- Grand Tours Vuelta a España 1 TTT stage (2013) One-day races and Classics National Time Trial Championships (2005, 2006, 2008, 2009, 2012, 2018) National Road Race Championships (2012)
Medal record
Men's road bicycle racing
Representing Ukraine
European Games
Silver medal – second place	2015 Baku	Road race

Andriy Askoldovych Hrivko (Ukrainian: Андрій Аскольдович Грівко, also transliterated Hryvko or Grivko, born 7 August 1983) is a Ukrainian former racing cyclist, who rode professionally between 2005 and 2018. Since retiring from racing, Hrivko currently serves as the president of the Ukrainian Cycling Federation.

== Career ==
Born in Zuya, Bilohirsk Raion, Hrivko competed at the 2008 Beijing Olympics in the road race, in which he did not finish, and the individual time trial, where he finished 31st. At the 2012 Summer Olympics, he only competed in the road race, finishing in 17th place.

He also competed in the 2015 European Games for Ukraine in cycling. He earned a silver medal in men's road race.

He competed for Ukraine in the 2016 Summer Olympics.

In 2017 Hrivko was removed from the Tour of Dubai for punching Marcel Kittel in the head during the third stage of that race, prompting a query into whether or not he should be suspended and sanctioned by the UCI.

After retiring from the professional peloton, Hrivko became the president of the Ukrainian Cycling Federation.

== Major results ==
2003
8th Trofeo Internazionale Bastianelli
2004
1st Overall Giro delle Regioni
8th Time trial, UCI Under-23 Road World Championships
2005
1st Time trial, National Road Championships
2nd Firenze–Pistoia
6th Rund um die Nürnberger Altstadt
2006
1st Time trial, National Road Championships
3rd Overall Critérium International
3rd GP Miguel Induráin
9th Time trial, UCI Road World Championships
2007
3rd Eindhoven Team Time Trial
9th Firenze–Pistoia
2008
1st Time trial, National Road Championships
1st Firenze–Pistoia
2nd Intaka Tech Worlds View Challenge 1
2nd Intaka Tech Worlds View Challenge 2
5th Road race, UCI Road World Championships
9th Chrono des Nations
2009
1st Time trial, National Road Championships
1st Stage 1b (TTT) Settimana Internazionale di Coppi e Bartali
2nd Overall Course de la Solidarité Olympique
3rd Gran Premio Nobili Rubinetterie
4th Overall Tour de San Luis
8th Chrono des Nations
2010
2nd Overall Three Days of De Panne
2011
6th Overall Three Days of De Panne
8th Overall Tour of Beijing
2012
National Road Championships

1st Road race
1st Time trial

5th Overall Tour of Belgium
2013
1st Stage 1 (TTT) Vuelta a España
2nd Time trial, National Road Championships
3rd Overall Eneco Tour
5th Road race, UCI Road World Championships
2014
4th Overall Eneco Tour
2015
European Games

2nd Road race
4th Time trial

6th Overall Eneco Tour
10th Overall Tour of Qatar
2016
1st Overall La Méditerranéenne

1st Stage 3

2017
10th Overall Arctic Race of Norway
2018
1st Time trial, National Road Championships
4th Overall Danmark Rundt
5th Overall Tour of Belgium
10th Overall Tour du Haut Var

=== Grand Tour general classification results timeline ===
Grand Tour	2005	2006	2007	2008	2009	2010	2011	2012	2013	2014	2015	2016	2017
Giro d'Italia	—	—	—	—	22	70	—	—	—	—	—	—	—
Tour de France	78	DNF	78	—	—	136	144	43	—	95	64	86	120
Vuelta a España	—	—	—	42	—	—	—	—	101	—	—	—	—

Legend
—	Did not compete
DNF	Did not finish
