= Azerbaijani National Time Trial Championships =

National road cycling championship in Azerbaijan

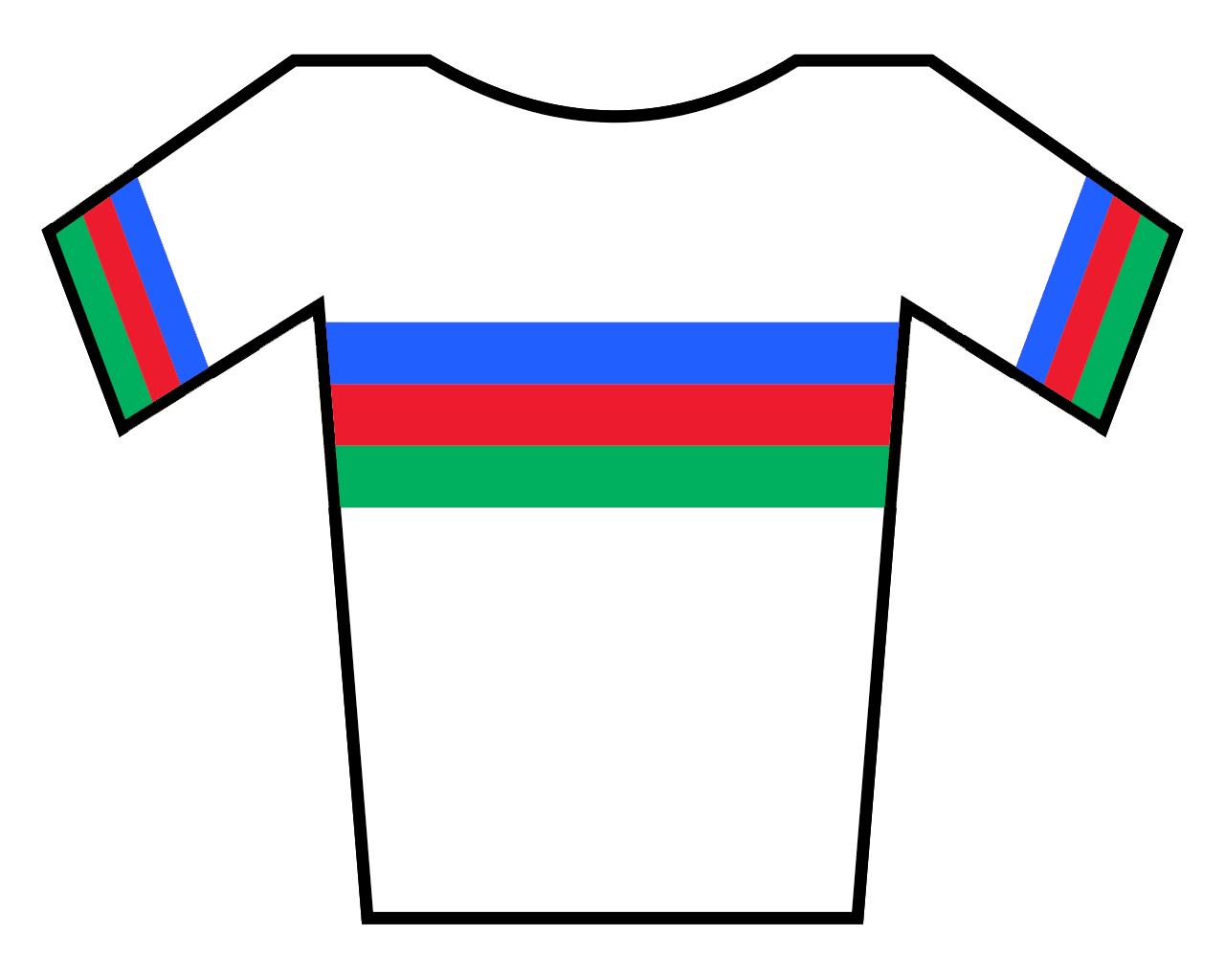
The champion's jersey

The Azerbaijani National Time Trial Championships is a cycling race where the Azerbaijani cyclists contest who will become the time trial champion for the year to come.

== Men ==
=== Elite ===
| Year | Gold | Silver | Bronze |
| 2012 | Elchin Asadov | Tural Isgandarov | Ruslan Mustafayev |
| 2013 | Elchin Asadov | Tural Isgandarov | Agshin Ismaylov |
| 2014 | Elchin Asadov | Samir Jabrayilov | Tural Isgandarov |
| 2015 | Maksym Averin | Elchin Asadov | Samir Jabrayilov |
| 2016 | Elchin Asadov | Maksym Averin | Samir Jabrayilov |
| 2017 | Elchin Asadov | Elgun Alizada | Samir Jabrayilov |
| 2018 | Elchin Asadov | Musa Mikayilzade | Qidar Mustafayev |
| 2019 | Elchin Asadov | Samir Jabrayilov | Musa Mikayilzade |
| 2021 | Musa Mikayilzade | Samir Jabrayilov | Amral Abdulazizli |
| 2022 | Elchin Asadov | Musa Mikayilzade | Elgun Alizada |
| 2023 | Samir Jabrayilov | Musa Mikayilzade | Tural Israfilov |
| 2024 | Musa Mikayilzade | Yusif Ismayilov | Mahmud Nevzat |

=== U23 ===
| Year | Gold | Silver | Bronze |
| 2015 | Samir Jabrayilov | Elgün Alizada | Enver Asanov |
| 2016 | Samir Jabrayilov | Ismail Iliasov | Elgün Alizada |

== Women ==
| Year | Gold | Silver | Bronze |
| 2012 | Elena Tchalykh | Elnara Musayeva | Jalala Osmanly |
| 2015 | Olena Pavlukhina | Ulfet Nazarli | Shalale Safarli |
| 2016 | Olena Pavlukhina | Ulfet Nazarli | Sevil Azizova |
| 2017 | Olena Pavlukhina | Ulfet Nazarli | Fatima Abdullayeva |
| 2018 | Olena Pavlukhina | Ulfet Nazarli | Rinata Abdullayeva |
| 2021 | Ayan Khankishiyeva | Natavan Valiyeva | Maleyka Isgandarova |
| 2022 | Viktoriya Sidorenko | Lala Abdurahmanova | Zahra Afganzade |
| 2023 | Viktoriya Sidorenko | Maryam Afghanzadeh | Radha Sabanova |

== See also ==
- Azerbaijani National Road Race Championships
- National Road Cycling Championships
