= Kirill Pozdnyakov =

Azerbaijani cyclist

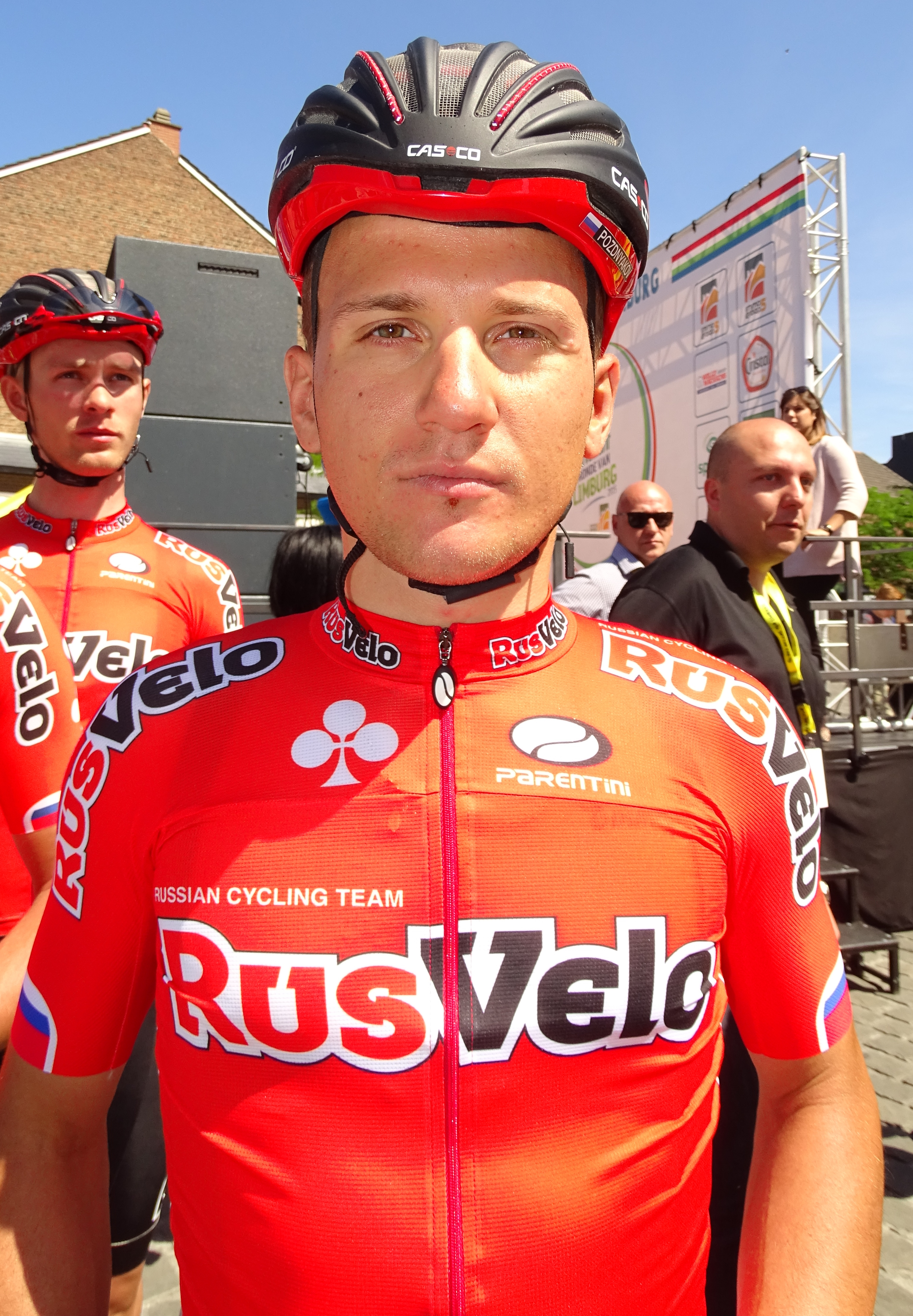
- Pozdnyakov in 2015

Personal information
- Full name: Kirill Pozdnyakov
- Born: 20 January 1989 (age 37) Unecha, Russia
- Height: 1.76 m (5 ft 9 in)
- Weight: 67 kg (148 lb)

Cycling career
- Sport: Cycling
- Current team: Retired
- Discipline: Road
- Role: Rider

Professional teams
- 2013: Synergy Baku
- 2014–2015: RusVelo
- 2016–2018: Synergy Baku
- 2019: Tarteletto–Isorex

Kirill Pozdnyakov (born 20 January 1989) is an Azerbaijani former professional racing cyclist, who rode professionally between 2013 and 2019 for teams RusVelo, Tarteletto–Isorex and two spells with the Synergy Baku team.

== Career ==
In November 2015 Synergy Baku announced that Pozdnyakov would rejoin them for the 2016 season, having been part of the team's squad in its debut season in 2013. He switched from Russian to Azerbaijani nationality in 2017.

=== Doping violation ===
In July 2019, the Azerbaijan Cycling Federation announced that he committed an Anti-Doping Rule Violation: Presence of a Prohibited Substance or its Metabolites or Markers in an Athlete’s Sample. The substance was Methylphenidate metabolite. His period of sanction began 11 May 2019, and he received 24 months of Ineligibility.

== Major results ==
2011
3rd Grand Prix Impanis-Van Petegem
2012
5th Flèche Ardennaise
2013
1st Overall Tour of China I

1st Stage 6

1st Stage 4 Rás Tailteann
3rd Overall Tour de Taiwan

1st Stage 1

3rd Overall Jelajah Malaysia

1st Stage 1

6th Overall Oberösterreich Rundfahrt
2016
1st Overall Tour of Szeklerland

1st Stages 2 & 3a (ITT)

1st Stage 3 (ITT) Sibiu Cycling Tour
3rd Overall Okolo Slovenska
7th Overall Tour of Croatia
2017
~~1st Road race, National Road Championships~~
~~1st Overall Tour d'Azerbaïdjan~~

~~1st Mountains classification~~
~~1st Stage 2~~

~~3rd Overall Tour du Maroc~~

~~1st Stages 1 & 4~~

8th Overall Settimana Internazionale di Coppi e Bartali
2018
1st Road race, National Road Championships
1st Grand Prix Alanya
2nd Overall Five Rings of Moscow

1st Points classification
1st Stage 4

5th Overall Tour du Maroc
7th Overall Tour of Mersin

1st Stage 1

2019
8th Overall Rhône-Alpes Isère Tour
