= Grand Prix Velo Erciyes =

Turkish one-day road cycling race

Race details
- Date: September
- Region: Kayseri Province
- Discipline: Road
- Competition: UCI Europe Tour
- Type: One-day race

History
- First edition: 2019 (men); 2020 (women)
- Editions: 3 (as of 2021)
- First winner: Onur Balkan (TUR)
- Most wins: No repeat winners
- Most recent: Azzedine Lagab (ALG)

History (women)
- First winner: Valeriya Kononenko (UKR)
- Most wins: No repeat winners
- Most recent: Valeriya Kononenko (UKR)

The Grand Prix Velo Erciyes is a men's and women's one-day road cycling race held in Turkey. It is rated as a 1.2 event on the UCI Europe Tour.

== Winners ==
=== Men ===
Year	Country	Rider	Team
2019	Turkey	Onur Balkan	Salcano–Sakarya BB Team
2020	Ukraine	Vitaliy Buts	Ukraine (national team)
2021	Algeria	Azzedine Lagab	Algeria

=== Women ===
Year	Country	Rider	Team
2020	Ukraine	Valeriya Kononenko	Ukraine (national team)
