= Tour of Black Sea =

Cycling race in Turkey

Race details
- Date: September
- Discipline: Road
- Competition: UCI Europe Tour
- Type: Stage race

History
- First edition: 2015
- Editions: 3
- Final edition: 2019
- First winner: Tomasz Marczyński (POL)
- Most wins: No repeat winners
- Final winner: Onur Balkan (TUR)

The Tour of Black Sea was a multi-day cycling race held in 2015, 2018 and 2019 in Turkey. It was part of the UCI Europe Tour as a category 2.2 race.

== Winners ==
Year	Winner	Second	Third
2015	(Poland) Tomasz Marczyński	(Turkey) Onur Balkan	(Turkey) Muhammet Atalay
2016–17: No race
2018	(Lithuania) Ramūnas Navardauskas	(Switzerland) Mauro Schmid	(Turkey) Mustafa Sayar
2019	(Turkey) Onur Balkan	(Azerbaijan) Samir Jabrayilov	(Ukraine) Vitaliy Buts
