= Azerbaijani National Road Race Championships =

National road cycling championship in Azerbaijan

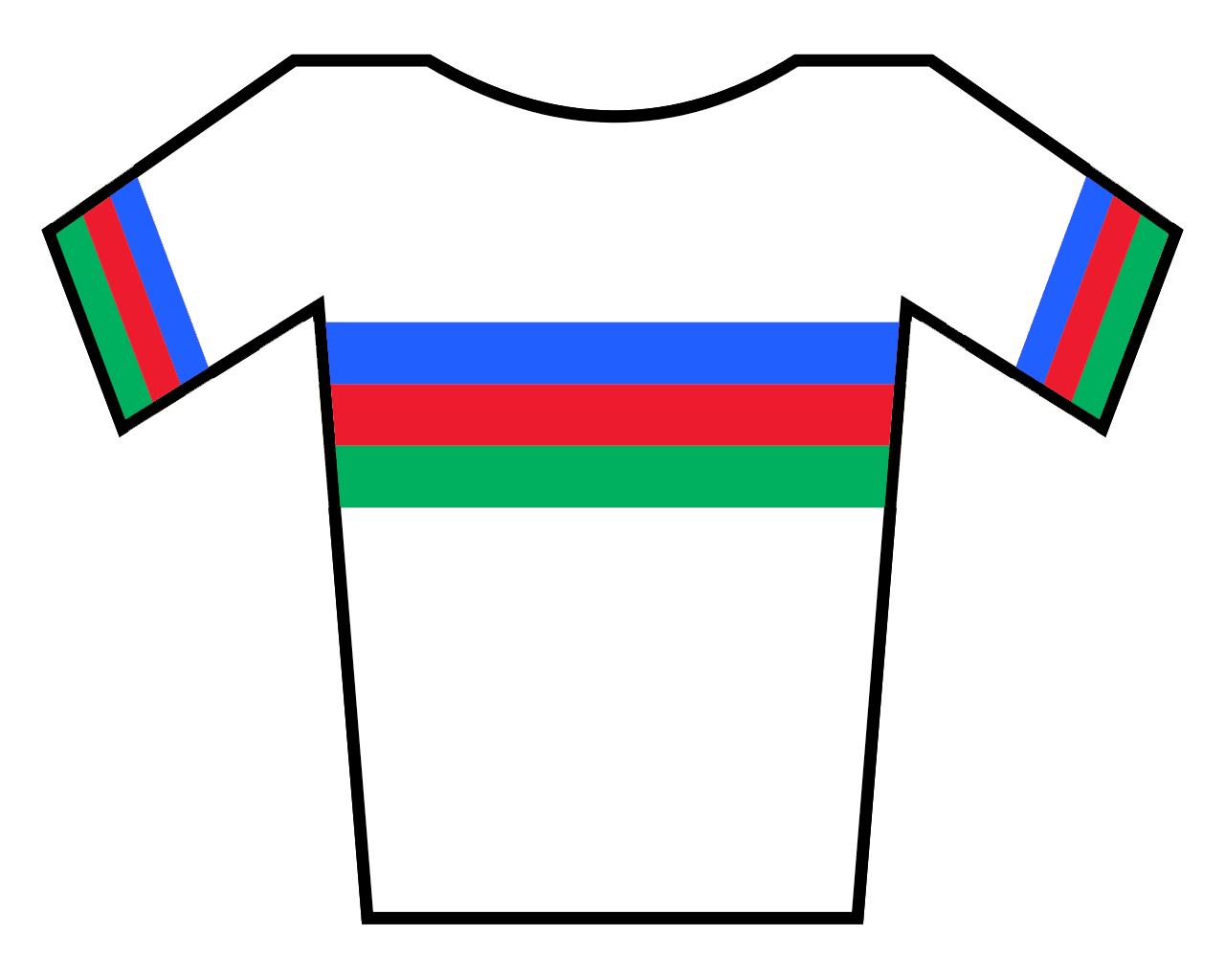
The champion's jersey

The Azerbaijani National Road Race Championships is a cycling race where the Azerbaijani cyclists contest who will become the champion for the year to come.

== Men ==
=== Elite ===
Year	Gold	Silver	Bronze
2012	Oleksandr Surutkovych	Elchin Asadov	Tural Isgandarov
2013	Samir Jabrayilov	Tural Isgandarov	Elchin Asadov
2014	Elchin Asadov	Tural Isgandarov	Samir Jabrayilov
2015	Maksym Averin	Elchin Asadov	Samir Jabrayilov
2016	Maksym Averin	Samir Jabrayilov	Elchin Asadov
2017	Elgun Alizada	Musa Mikayilzade	Elchin Asadov
2018	Kirill Pozdnyakov	Samir Jabrayilov	Elchin Asadov
2019	Elchin Asadov	Samir Jabrayilov	Musa Mikayilzade
2021	Musa Mikayilzade	Samir Jabrayilov	Shahin Eyvazov
2022	Elchin Asadov	Musa Mikayilzade	Mahmud Mammadov
2023	Ali Gurbanov	Musa Mikayilzade	Samir Jabrayilov
2024	Musa Mikayilzade	Mahmud Nevzat	Yusif Ismayilov

=== U23 ===
Year	Gold	Silver	Bronze
2015	Samir Jabrayilov	Elgün Alizada	Enver Asanov
2016	Samir Jabrayilov	Ismail Iliasov	Elgün Alizada

== Women ==
Year	Gold	Silver	Bronze
2012	Elena Tchalykh	Elnara Musayeva	Shabnam Maharramova
2015	Olena Pavlukhina	Ulfet Nazarli	Sevil Azizova
2016	Olena Pavlukhina	Ulfet Nazarli	Sevil Azizova
2017	Olena Pavlukhina	Ulfet Nazarli	Rinata Abdullayeva
2018	Olena Pavlukhina	Rinata Abdullayeva	Ulfet Nazarli
2021	Ayan Khankishiyeva	Natavan Valiyeva	Maleyka Isgandarova
2022	Victoriya Sidorenko	Lala Abdurahmanova	Zahra Afganzade

== See also ==
- Azerbaijani National Time Trial Championships
- National Road Cycling Championships
