= Synergy Baku Cycling Project =

Azerbaijani cycling team

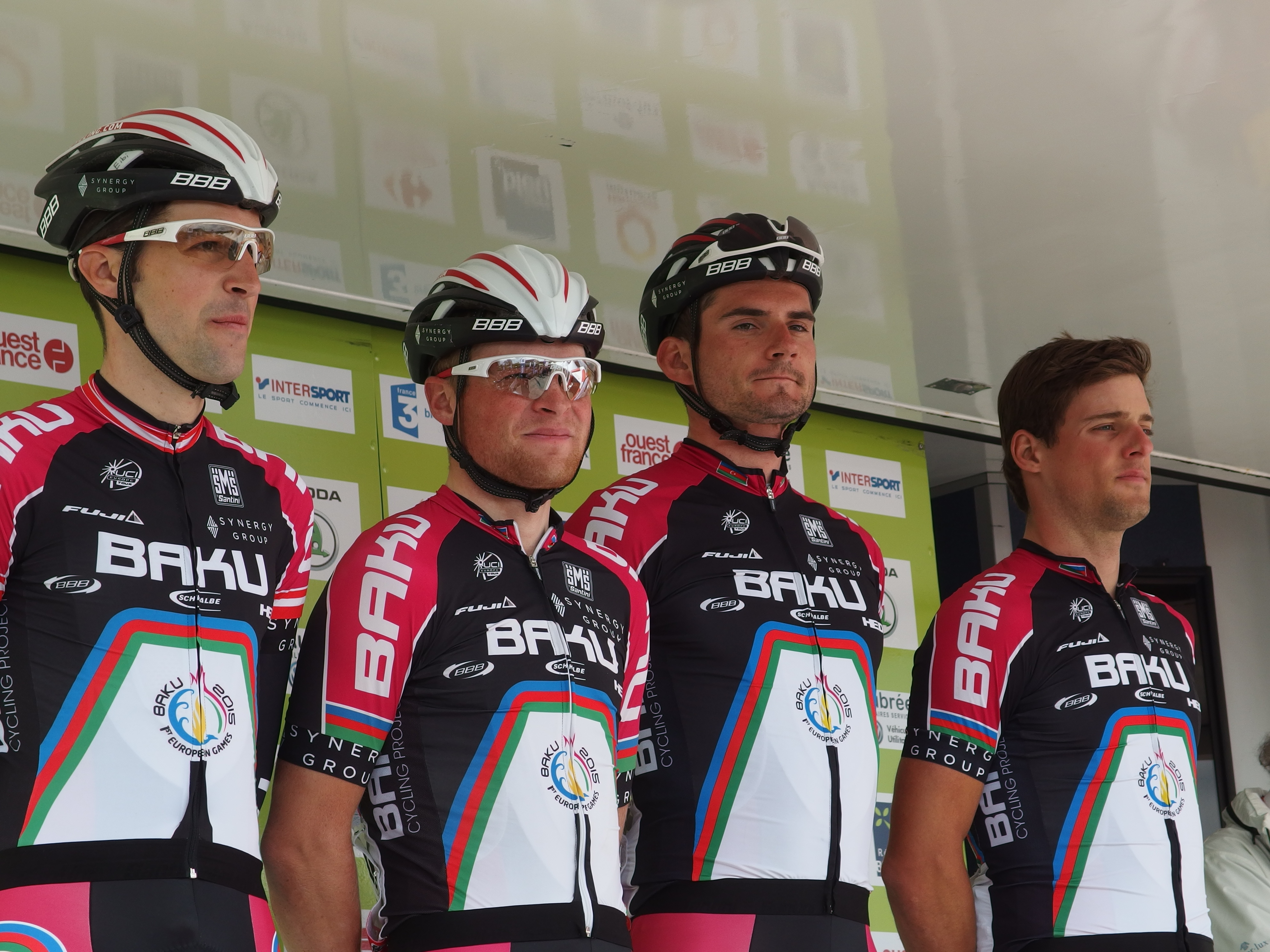

Team information
- UCI code: BCP
- Registered: Baku, Azerbaijan
- Founded: 2013
- Disbanded: 2018
- Discipline: Road
- Status: UCI Continental Team

Key personnel
- Team manager: Jeremy Hunt

Team name history
- 2013–2018: Synergy Baku Cycling Project (CZP)

The Synergy Baku Cycling Project (UCI team code: BCP) was an Azerbaijani UCI Continental cycling team active from 2013 to 2018. The team was managed by former professional cyclist Jeremy Hunt and sponsored by the Synergy Group.

Competing primarily in road cycling events, the team aimed to develop Azerbaijani cyclists and raise the profile of cycling in Azerbaijan. It participated in various international races under the UCI Continental status.

== Team roster ==
Rider	Date of birth
Elgün Alizada (AZE)	20 April 1996 (age 30)
Elchin Asadov (AZE)	12 February 1987 (age 39)
Enver Asanov (AZE)	25 October 1994 (age 31)
Kanan Gahramanli (AZE)	9 June 1997 (age 29)
Samir Jabrayilov (AZE)	7 September 1994 (age 31)
Musa Mikayilzade (AZE)	16 June 1998 (age 28)

Rider	Date of birth
Oleksandr Polivoda (UKR)	31 March 1987 (age 39)
Kirill Pozdnyakov (AZE)	20 January 1989 (age 37)
Mikayil Safarli (AZE)	8 February 1999 (age 27)
Karam Shiriyev (AZE)	3 June 1996 (age 30)
Telman Veliyev (AZE)	10 August 1998 (age 28)

== Major wins ==
2013
Azerbaijan Road Race Championships, Samir Jabrayilov
Azerbaijan Time Trial Championships, Elchin Asadov
Stage 1 Tour de Taiwan, Kirill Pozdnyakov
Stage 1 Tour of Thailand, Rico Rogers
Stage 1 Tour d'Azerbaïdjan, Christoph Schweizer
Stage 4 Rás Tailteann, Kirill Pozdnyakov
Stage 6 Rás Tailteann, Rico Rogers
Stage 1 Jelajah Malaysia, Kirill Pozdnyakov
Stage 5 Jelajah Malaysia, Samir Jabrayilov
Stage 1 Tour de East Java, Anuar Manan
Stage 3 Tour de East Java, John Ebsen
Overall Tour of China I, Kirill Pozdnyakov

Stage 6, Kirill Pozdnyakov

Stage 6 Tour of China II, Rico Rogers
2014
Azerbaijan Time Trial Championships, Elchin Asadov
Azerbaijan Road Race Championships, Elchin Asadov
Poreč Trophy, Maksym Averin
Stage 4 Tour de Bretagne, Markus Eibegger
Stage 3 Rás Tailteann, Jan Sokol
Stage 6 Rás Tailteann, Markus Eibegger
2015
Overall Istrian Spring Trophy, Markus Eibegger

Stage 2, Markus Eibegger

Team classification Tour d'Azerbaïdjan
Stage 2 Tour de Bretagne, Matej Mugerli
Azerbaijan Road Race Championships, Maksym Averin
Azerbaijan Time Trial Championships, Maksym Averin
Stage 2 Okolo Slovenska, Maksym Averin
Greece Time Trial Championships, Ioannis Tamouridis
2016
Poreč Trophy, Matej Mugerli
Stage 3 Istrian Spring Trophy, Matej Mugerli
Overall Tour of Croatia, Matija Kvasina
Team classification Tour of Croatia
Stage 2 Tour d'Azerbaïdjan, Maksym Averin
Stage 3 Tour d'Azerbaïdjan, Matej Mugerli
Team classification Tour d'Azerbaïdjan
Azerbaijan Road Race Championships, Maksym Averin
Azerbaijan Time Trial Championships, Maksym Averin
Greece Time Trial Championships, Ioannis Tamouridis
Croatia Time Trial Championships, Matija Kvasina
Stage 3 (ITT) Sibiu Cycling Tour, Kirill Pozdnyakov
2017
Stages 1, 4 & 7 Tour du Maroc, Kirill Pozdnyakov
Overall Tour d'Azerbaïdjan, Kirill Pozdnyakov

Stage 2, Kirill Pozdnyakov

Croatia Road Race Championships, Josip Rumac
Azerbaijan Road Race Championships, Kirill Pozdnyakov
Azerbaijan Time Trial Championships, Maksym Averin
2018
Grand Prix Alanya, Kirill Pozdnyakov
Stage 1 Tour of Mersin, Kirill Pozdnyakov
Stage 4 Five Rings of Moscow, Kirill Pozdnyakov

== National champions ==
2013
Azerbaijan Road Race, Samir Jabrayilov
Azerbaijan Time Trial, Elchin Asadov
2014
Azerbaijan Time Trial, Elchin Asadov
Azerbaijan Road Race, Elchin Asadov
2015
Azerbaijan Road Race, Maksym Averin
Azerbaijan Time Trial, Maksym Averin
Greece Time Trial, Ioannis Tamouridis
2016
Azerbaijan Road Race, Maksym Averin
Azerbaijan Time Trial, Maksym Averin
Greece Time Trial, Ioannis Tamouridis
Croatia Time Trial, Matija Kvasina
2017
Croatia Road Race, Josip Rumac
Azerbaijan Road Race, Kirill Pozdnyakov
Azerbaijan Time Trial, Maksym Averin
