= 2012 Tour of Turkey =

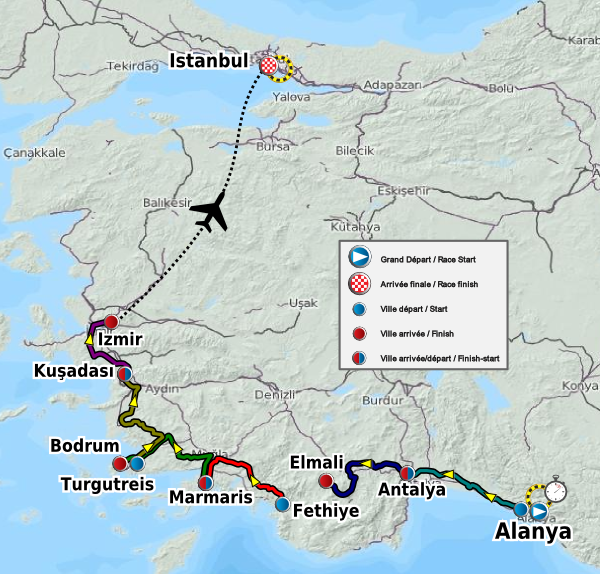

Race details
- Dates: 22–29 April 2012
- Stages: 8
- Distance: 1,174 km (729.5 mi)
- Winning time: 28h 48' 10"

Results
Jersey awarded to the overall winner	Winner	Alexsandr Dyachenko (KAZ)	(Astana)
	Second	Danail Petrov (BUL)	(Caja Rural)
	Third	Adrián Palomares (ESP)	(Andalucía)
Jersey awarded to the points classification winner	Points	Matthew Goss (AUS)	(GreenEDGE)
Jersey awarded to the mountains classification winner	Mountains	Marco Bandiera (ITA)	(Omega Pharma–Quick-Step)
Jersey awarded to the sprints classification winner	Sprints	Maxim Belkov (RUS)	(Team Katusha)
	Team	Astana	

The 2012 Tour of Turkey was the 48th edition of the Presidential Cycling Tour of Turkey cycling stage race. It was held from 22 April–29 April 2012, and was rated as a 2.HC event on the UCI Europe Tour. Bulgarian Ivailo Gabrovski originally won the race after dominating the third stage, but was later found to have used EPO and was disqualified. It was officially announced in October 2012 that the winner of the Tour of Turkey is Alexsandr Dyachenko of Astana.

== Teams and cyclists ==
There are 25 teams in the 2012 Tour of Turkey. Among them were 9 UCI ProTeams, 14 UCI Professional Continental teams, and 2 Continental teams. Each team was allowed eight riders on their squad, giving the event a peloton of 194 cyclists at its outset.

UCI ProTour Teams

- Ag2r–La Mondiale
- Astana
- GreenEDGE
- Team Katusha
- Lampre–ISD
- Lotto–Belisol
- Omega Pharma–Quick-Step
- Rabobank
- Team Saxo Bank

UCI Professional Continental Teams

- Accent.jobs–Willems Veranda's
- Andalucía
- Bretagne–Schuller
- Caja Rural
- Colnago–CSF Bardiani
- Colombia–Coldeportes
- Team Europcar
- Farnese Vini–Selle Italia
- Argos–Shimano
- Team NetApp
- SpiderTech–C10
- Team Type 1–Sanofi
- UnitedHealthcare
- Utensilnord–Named

UCI Continental Teams

- Salcano – Arnavutköy Cycling Team
- Konya – Torku Seker Spor

== Stages ==
=== Stage 1 ===
22 April 2012 – Alanya, 135 km (83.9 mi)

A huge crash decimated about half the field with a few kilometers to go. Some riders had to withdraw from the race due to injuries. As per the UCI rules, since the crash occurred less than 3 kilometers away from the finish, all riders caught in the accident were credited the same time as the winner.

Stage 1 results

	Cyclist	Team	Time
1	Theo Bos (NED)	Rabobank	3h 05' 55"
2	Matthew Goss (AUS)	GreenEDGE	+ 0"
3	Daniele Colli (ITA)	Team Type 1–Sanofi	+ 0"
4	Alessandro Petacchi (ITA)	Lampre–ISD	+ 0"
5	Boy Van Poppel (NED)	UnitedHealthcare	+ 0"
6	Francesco Chicchi (ITA)	Omega Pharma–Quick-Step	+ 0"
7	Takashi Miyazawa (JPN)	Team Saxo Bank	+ 0"
8	Rafael Andriato (BRA)	Farnese Vini–Selle Italia	+ 0"
9	Filippo Baggio (ITA)	Utensilnord–Named	+ 0"
10	Tom Veelers (NED)	Argos–Shimano	+ 0"

General Classification after Stage 1

	Cyclist	Team	Time
1	Theo Bos (NED)	Rabobank	3h 05' 45"
2	Matthew Goss (AUS)	GreenEDGE	+ 4"
3	Daniele Colli (ITA)	Team Type 1–Sanofi	+ 6"
4	Alessandro Petacchi (ITA)	Lampre–ISD	+ 10"
5	Boy Van Poppel (NED)	UnitedHealthcare	+ 10"
6	Francesco Chicchi (ITA)	Omega Pharma–Quick-Step	+ 10"
7	Takashi Miyazawa (JPN)	Team Saxo Bank	+ 10"
8	Rafael Andriato (BRA)	Farnese Vini–Selle Italia	+ 10"
9	Filippo Baggio (ITA)	Utensilnord–Named	+ 10"
10	Tom Veelers (NED)	Argos–Shimano	+ 10"

=== Stage 2 ===
23 April 2012 – Alanya to Antalya, 153 km (95.1 mi)

A breakaway formed at kilometer 48 composed of Alexander Vinokourov (Astana), Laurent Pichon (Bretagne–Schuller), Paolo Locatelli (Colnago–CSF Bardiani), László Bodrogi (Team Type 1–Sanofi) and Matteo Fedi (Utensilnord–Named). They were caught with 5 kilometers to go, leading to a mass sprint finish.

Stage 2 results

	Cyclist	Team	Time
1	André Greipel (GER)	Lotto–Belisol	3h 16' 04"
2	Matthew Goss (AUS)	GreenEDGE	+ 0"
3	Matteo Pelucchi (ITA)	Team Europcar	+ 0"
4	Mark Renshaw (AUS)	Rabobank	+ 0"
5	André Schulze (GER)	Team NetApp	+ 0"
6	Francesco Chicchi (ITA)	Omega Pharma–Quick-Step	+ 0"
7	Jacopo Guarnieri (ITA)	Astana	+ 0"
8	Filippo Baggio (ITA)	Utensilnord–Named	+ 0"
9	Alexey Tsatevitch (RUS)	Team Katusha	+ 0"
10	Andrea Guardini (ITA)	Farnese Vini–Selle Italia	+ 0"

General Classification after Stage 2

	Cyclist	Team	Time
1	Matthew Goss (AUS)	GreenEDGE	6h 21' 47"
2	André Greipel (GER)	Lotto–Belisol	+ 2"
3	Matteo Pelucchi (ITA)	Team Europcar	+ 8"
4	Theo Bos (NED)	Rabobank	+ 8"
5	Francesco Chicchi (ITA)	Omega Pharma–Quick-Step	+ 12"
6	Filippo Baggio (ITA)	Utensilnord–Named	+ 12"
7	Mark Renshaw (AUS)	Rabobank	+ 12"
8	Valentin Iglinsky (KAZ)	Astana	+ 12"
9	Alessandro Petacchi (ITA)	Lampre–ISD	+ 12"
10	Alexey Tsatevitch (RUS)	Team Katusha	+ 12"

=== Stage 3 ===
24 April 2012 – Antalya to Elmalı, 152 km (94.4 mi)

Bulgarian Ivailo Gabrovski (Konya–Torku Şekerspor) accelerated 8 kilometers away from the finish line in the first mountain top finish stage in the race's history. He went on to win solo and took the leader's jersey. A doping test performed after this stage would eventually lead to Gabrovski's disqualification.

Stage 3 results

	Cyclist	Team	Time
1	~~Ivailo Gabrovski (BUL)~~	Konya–Torku Şekerspor	4h 21' 09"
2	Alexsandr Dyachenko (KAZ)	Astana	+ 1'29"
3	Danail Petrov (BUL)	Caja Rural	+ 1'32"
4	Adrián Palomares (ESP)	Andalucía	+ 1'34"
5	Romain Bardet (FRA)	Ag2r–La Mondiale	+ 1'51"
6	Alexander Efimkin (RUS)	Team Type 1–Sanofi	+ 2'13"
7	Florian Guillou (FRA)	Bretagne–Schuller	+ 2'19"
8	Enrico Battaglin (ITA)	Colnago–CSF Bardiani	+ 2'38"
9	Michał Gołaś (POL)	Omega Pharma–Quick-Step	+ 2'52"
10	Will Routley (CAN)	SpiderTech–C10	+ 2'55"

General Classification after Stage 3

	Cyclist	Team	Time
1	~~Ivailo Gabrovski (BUL)~~	Konya–Torku Şekerspor	10h 43' 04"
2	Alexsandr Dyachenko (KAZ)	Astana	+ 1'33"
3	Danail Petrov (BUL)	Caja Rural	+ 1'38"
4	Adrián Palomares (ESP)	Andalucía	+ 1'44"
5	Romain Bardet (FRA)	Ag2r–La Mondiale	+ 2'01"
6	Alexander Efimkin (RUS)	Team Type 1–Sanofi	+ 2'23"
7	Florian Guillou (FRA)	Bretagne–Schuller	+ 2'29"
8	Enrico Battaglin (ITA)	Colnago–CSF Bardiani	+ 2'48"
9	Michał Gołaś (POL)	Omega Pharma–Quick-Step	+ 3'02"
10	Will Routley (CAN)	SpiderTech–C10	+ 3'05"

=== Stage 4 ===
25 April 2012 – Fethiye to Marmaris, 132 km (82.0 mi)

The mass sprint was very close with Mark Renshaw (Rabobank) taking the win over fellow Australian Matthew Goss (GreenEDGE) by a margin that was impossible to distinguish with the naked eye.

Stage 4 results

	Cyclist	Team	Time
1	Mark Renshaw (AUS)	Rabobank	3h 14' 01"
2	Matthew Goss (AUS)	GreenEDGE	+ 0"
3	Daniele Colli (ITA)	Team Type 1–Sanofi	+ 0"
4	Boy Van Poppel (NED)	UnitedHealthcare	+ 0"
5	Davide Viganò (ITA)	Lampre–ISD	+ 0"
6	Alexey Tsatevitch (RUS)	Team Katusha	+ 0"
7	Florian Vachon (FRA)	Bretagne–Schuller	+ 0"
8	James Van Landschoot (BEL)	Accent.jobs–Willems Veranda's	+ 0"
9	Lucas Sebastián Haedo (ARG)	Team Saxo Bank	+ 0"
10	Sébastien Turgot (FRA)	Team Europcar	+ 0"

General Classification after Stage 4

	Cyclist	Team	Time
1	~~Ivailo Gabrovski (BUL)~~	Konya–Torku Şekerspor	13h 57' 05"
2	Alexsandr Dyachenko (KAZ)	Astana	+ 1'33"
3	Danail Petrov (BUL)	Caja Rural	+ 1'38"
4	Adrián Palomares (ESP)	Andalucía	+ 1'44"
5	Romain Bardet (FRA)	Ag2r–La Mondiale	+ 2'01"
6	Alexander Efimkin (RUS)	Team Type 1–Sanofi	+ 2'23"
7	Florian Guillou (FRA)	Bretagne–Schuller	+ 2'29"
8	Enrico Battaglin (ITA)	Colnago–CSF Bardiani	+ 2'48"
9	Michał Gołaś (POL)	Omega Pharma–Quick-Step	+ 3'02"
10	Will Routley (CAN)	SpiderTech–C10	+ 3'05"

=== Stage 5 ===
26 April 2012 – Marmaris to Turgutreis, 178 km (110.6 mi)

First professional victory for 23-year-old Andrea Di Corrado (Colnago–CSF Bardiani), who dropped his 5 breakaway companions to solo his way to the finish line.

Stage 5 results

	Cyclist	Team	Time
1	Andrea Di Corrado (ITA)	Colnago–CSF Bardiani	4h 50' 25"
2	Jonas Aaen Jørgensen (DEN)	Team Saxo Bank	+ 40"
3	Jérôme Cousin (FRA)	Team Europcar	+ 40"
4	Alfredo Balloni (ITA)	Farnese Vini–Selle Italia	+ 42"
5	Sébastien Duret (FRA)	Bretagne–Schuller	+ 42"
6	Dmitriy Gruzdev (KAZ)	Astana	+ 42"
7	Matteo Pelucchi (ITA)	Team Europcar	+ 1' 27"
8	Alexey Tsatevich (RUS)	Team Katusha	+ 1' 27"
9	Rafaâ Chtioui (TUN)	Team Europcar	+ 1' 27"
10	Andrea Guardini (ITA)	Farnese Vini–Selle Italia	+ 1' 27"

General Classification after Stage 5

	Cyclist	Team	Time
1	~~Ivailo Gabrovski (BUL)~~	Konya–Torku Şekerspor	18h 48' 57"
2	Alexsandr Dyachenko (KAZ)	Astana	+ 1'33"
3	Danail Petrov (BUL)	Caja Rural	+ 1'38"
4	Adrián Palomares (ESP)	Andalucía	+ 1'44"
5	Romain Bardet (FRA)	Ag2r–La Mondiale	+ 2'01"
6	Alexander Efimkin (RUS)	Team Type 1–Sanofi	+ 2'23"
7	Florian Guillou (FRA)	Bretagne–Schuller	+ 2'29"
8	Enrico Battaglin (ITA)	Colnago–CSF Bardiani	+ 2'58"
9	Michał Gołaś (POL)	Omega Pharma–Quick-Step	+ 3'02"
10	Will Routley (CAN)	SpiderTech–C10	+ 3'05"

=== Stage 6 ===
27 April 2012 – Bodrum to Kuşadası, 179 km (111.2 mi)

Gabrovski defended his leader's jersey with the few of his teammates of Konya – Torku Seker Spor who had the resources to help, as they were left in front of the peloton without any help to catch the 3 escapees. They ultimately reeled them in, and a long series of attacks ensued with about 20 kilometers to go, all of which were covered by Gabrovski himself since his team did not have the resources to keep the frantic pace up. Twenty-four-year-old Sacha Modolo (Colnago–CSF Bardiani) won the sprint finish.

Stage 6 results

	Cyclist	Team	Time
1	Sacha Modolo (ITA)	Colnago–CSF Bardiani	4h 34' 00"
2	Matthew Goss (AUS)	GreenEDGE	+ 0"
3	Mark Renshaw (AUS)	Rabobank	+ 0"
4	Lucas Sebastián Haedo (ARG)	Team Saxo Bank	+ 0"
5	Alexey Tsatevich (RUS)	Team Katusha	+ 0"
6	Rafael Andriato (BRA)	Farnese Vini–Selle Italia	+ 0"
7	Daniele Colli (ITA)	Team Type 1–Sanofi	+ 0"
8	Davide Viganò (ITA)	Lampre–ISD	+ 0"
9	Marco Coledan (ITA)	Colnago–CSF Bardiani	+ 0"
10	Blaž Jarc (SLO)	Team NetApp	+ 0"

General Classification after Stage 6

	Cyclist	Team	Time
1	~~Ivailo Gabrovski (BUL)~~	Konya–Torku Şekerspor	23h 22' 57"
2	Alexsandr Dyachenko (KAZ)	Astana	+ 1'33"
3	Danail Petrov (BUL)	Caja Rural	+ 1'38"
4	Adrián Palomares (ESP)	Andalucía	+ 1'44"
5	Romain Bardet (FRA)	Ag2r–La Mondiale	+ 2'01"
6	Alexander Efimkin (RUS)	Team Type 1–Sanofi	+ 2'23"
7	Florian Guillou (FRA)	Bretagne–Schuller	+ 2'29"
8	Enrico Battaglin (ITA)	Colnago–CSF Bardiani	+ 2'58"
9	Michał Gołaś (POL)	Omega Pharma–Quick-Step	+ 3'02"
10	Will Routley (CAN)	SpiderTech–C10	+ 3'14"

=== Stage 7 ===
28 April 2012 – Kuşadası to İzmir, 124 km (77.1 mi)

Belgian Iljo Keisse of Omega Pharma–Quick-Step won the stage after dropping his 6 breakaway companions with 6 kilometers to go, building a sizable gap with them and the surging peloton. In a finish that was most dramatic, Keisse crashed while negotiating the final bend with 1 km to go. He picked himself up and was almost swept up by the charging bunch, who were on his back wheel as he crossed the finish line.

Stage 7 results

	Cyclist	Team	Time
1	Iljo Keisse (BEL)	Omega Pharma–Quick-Step	2h 52' 38"
2	Marcel Kittel (GER)	Argos–Shimano	+ 0"
3	Alessandro Petacchi (ITA)	Lampre–ISD	+ 0"
4	Andrea Guardini (ITA)	Farnese Vini–Selle Italia	+ 0"
5	Mark Renshaw (AUS)	Rabobank	+ 0"
6	Robert Förster (GER)	UnitedHealthcare	+ 0"
7	Jean-Pierre Drucker (LUX)	Accent.jobs–Willems Veranda's	+ 0"
8	Daniele Colli (ITA)	Team Type 1–Sanofi	+ 0"
9	Alexey Tsatevitch (RUS)	Team Katusha	+ 0"
10	Juan Jose Haedo (ARG)	Team Saxo Bank	+ 0"

General Classification after Stage 7

	Cyclist	Team	Time
1	~~Ivailo Gabrovski (BUL)~~	Konya–Torku Şekerspor	26h 15' 35"
2	Alexsandr Dyachenko (KAZ)	Astana	+ 1'33"
3	Danail Petrov (BUL)	Caja Rural	+ 1'38"
4	Adrián Palomares (ESP)	Andalucía	+ 1'44"
5	Romain Bardet (FRA)	Ag2r–La Mondiale	+ 2'01"
6	Alexander Efimkin (RUS)	Team Type 1–Sanofi	+ 2'23"
7	Florian Guillou (FRA)	Bretagne–Schuller	+ 2'29"
8	Enrico Battaglin (ITA)	Colnago–CSF Bardiani	+ 2'58"
9	Michał Gołaś (POL)	Omega Pharma–Quick-Step	+ 3'02"
10	Will Routley (CAN)	SpiderTech–C10	+ 3'14"

=== Stage 8 ===
29 April 2012 – Istanbul, 121 km (75.2 mi)

General classification contender Vladimir Gusev of Team Katusha (12th before the stage) got away with 3 other cyclists so the bunch chased relentlessly. They caught the escapees with less than 7 kilometers to go. Theo Bos of Rabobank won the sprint after a crash eliminated some top sprinters from the race. Ivailo Gabrovski kept the turquoise jersey and was declared the general classification winner.

Stage 8 results

	Cyclist	Team	Time
1	Theo Bos (NED)	Rabobank	2h 32' 35"
2	Andrew Fenn (GBR)	Omega Pharma–Quick-Step	+ 0"
3	Stefan van Dijk (NED)	Accent.jobs–Willems Veranda's	+ 0"
4	Andrea Guardini (ITA)	Farnese Vini–Selle Italia	+ 0"
5	Matteo Pelucchi (ITA)	Team Europcar	+ 0"
6	Alessandro Petacchi (ITA)	Lampre–ISD	+ 0"
7	Robert Förster (GER)	UnitedHealthcare	+ 0"
8	Juan Jose Haedo (ARG)	Team Saxo Bank	+ 0"
9	Daniele Colli (ITA)	Team Type 1–Sanofi	+ 0"
10	Jonas Vangenechten (BEL)	Lotto–Belisol	+ 0"

General Classification after Stage 8

	Cyclist	Team	Time
1	~~Ivailo Gabrovski (BUL)~~	Konya–Torku Şekerspor	28h 48' 10"
2	Alexsandr Dyachenko (KAZ)	Astana	+ 1'33"
3	Danail Petrov (BUL)	Caja Rural	+ 1'38"
4	Adrián Palomares (ESP)	Andalucía	+ 1'44"
5	Romain Bardet (FRA)	Ag2r–La Mondiale	+ 2'01"
6	Alexander Efimkin (RUS)	Team Type 1–Sanofi	+ 2'23"
7	Florian Guillou (FRA)	Bretagne–Schuller	+ 2'29"
8	Enrico Battaglin (ITA)	Colnago–CSF Bardiani	+ 2'58"
9	Michał Gołaś (POL)	Omega Pharma–Quick-Step	+ 3'02"
10	Will Routley (CAN)	SpiderTech–C10	+ 3'14"

== Classification leadership ==
Stage	Winner	General Classification	Points Classification	Mountains Classification	Turkish Beauties Classification	Team Classification
1	Theo Bos	Theo Bos	Theo Bos	not awarded	Fréderique Robert	Utensilnord–Named
2	André Greipel	Matthew Goss	Matthew Goss	not awarded	László Bodrogi	Team Katusha
3	Alexsandr Dyachenko	~~Ivailo Gabrovski~~	Matthew Goss	~~Ivaïlo Gabrovski~~	Matteo Fedi	Astana
4	Mark Renshaw	~~Ivailo Gabrovski~~	Matthew Goss	~~Ivaïlo Gabrovski~~	Matteo Fedi	Astana
5	Andrea Di Corrado	~~Ivailo Gabrovski~~	Matthew Goss	~~Ivaïlo Gabrovski~~	Matteo Fedi	Astana
6	Sacha Modolo	~~Ivailo Gabrovski~~	Matthew Goss	Marco Bandiera	Maxim Belkov	Astana
7	Iljo Keisse	~~Ivailo Gabrovski~~	Matthew Goss	Marco Bandiera	Maxim Belkov	Astana
8	Theo Bos	~~Ivailo Gabrovski~~	Matthew Goss	Marco Bandiera	Maxim Belkov	Astana
Final		Alexsandr Dyachenko	Matthew Goss	Marco Bandiera	Maxim Belkov	Astana
