= 2013 Tour of Turkey =

Race details
- Dates: 21–28 April 2013
- Stages: 8
- Distance: 1,205 km (749 mi)
- Winning time: 29h 13' 13"

Results
| Jersey awarded to the overall winner | Winner | Natnael Berhane (ERI) | (Team Europcar) |
| | Second | Yoann Bagot (FRA) | (Cofidis) |
| | Third | Maxime Méderel (FRA) | (Sojasun) |
| Jersey awarded to the points classification winner | Points | André Greipel (GER) | (Lotto–Belisol) |
| Jersey awarded to the mountains classification winner | Mountains | Sergiy Grechyn (UKR) | (Torku Şekerspor) |
| Jersey awarded to the sprints classification winner | Sprints | Mikhail Ignatiev (RUS) | (Team Katusha) |
| | Team | Cofidis | |

The 2013 Tour of Turkey was the 49th edition of the Presidential Cycling Tour of Turkey cycling stage race. It was held from 21 April to 28 April 2013, and was rated as a 2.HC event on the UCI Europe Tour. In early 2014 Turkish Cycling Federation disqualified the original winner Mustafa Sayar and announced Natnael Berhane's victory.

== Teams ==
There were 25 teams participating in the 2013 Tour of Turkey. Among them were 9 UCI ProTeams, 15 UCI Professional Continental teams, and 1 UCI Continental team. Each team were allowed a maximum of eight riders on their squad, giving the event a peloton of 193 cyclists at its outset.

UCI ProTour Teams

- Astana
- Blanco Pro Cycling
- Team Katusha
- Lampre–Merida
- Lotto–Belisol
- Omega Pharma–Quick-Step
- Orica–GreenEDGE
- Argos–Shimano
- Saxo–Tinkoff

UCI Professional Continental Teams

- Accent Jobs–Wanty
- Bardiani Valvole–CSF Inox
- Bretagne–Séché Environnement
- Caja Rural–Seguros RGA
- CCC–Polsat–Polkowice
- Cofidis
- Colombia
- Crelan–Euphony
- MTN–Qhubeka
- Sojasun
- Team Europcar
- NetApp–Endura
- Team Novo Nordisk
- UnitedHealthcare
- Vini Fantini–Selle Italia

UCI Continental Teams

- Torku Şekerspor

== Stages ==
=== Stage 1 ===
21 April 2013 – Alanya to Alanya, 143 km (88.9 mi)

Stage 1 results

| | Cyclist | Team | Time |
|---|---|---|---|
| 1 | Marcel Kittel (GER) | Argos–Shimano | 3h 08' 37" |
| 2 | André Greipel (GER) | Lotto–Belisol | s.t. |
| 3 | Yuriy Metlushenko (UKR) | Torku Şekerspor | s.t. |
| 4 | Roger Kluge (GER) | NetApp–Endura | s.t. |
| 5 | Andrew Fenn (GBR) | Omega Pharma–Quick-Step | s.t. |
| 6 | Francesco Lasca (ITA) | Caja Rural–Seguros RGA | s.t. |
| 7 | Danilo Napolitano (ITA) | Accent Jobs–Wanty | s.t. |
| 8 | Grzegorz Stepniak (POL) | CCC–Polsat–Polkowice | s.t. |
| 9 | Edwin Ávila (COL) | Colombia | s.t. |
| 10 | Sacha Modolo (ITA) | Bardiani Valvole–CSF Inox | s.t. |

General Classification after Stage 1

| | Cyclist | Team | Time |
|---|---|---|---|
| 1 | Marcel Kittel (GER) | Argos–Shimano | 3h 08' 37" |
| 2 | André Greipel (GER) | Lotto–Belisol | + 4" |
| 3 | Yuriy Metlushenko (UKR) | Torku Şekerspor | + 6" |
| 4 | Roger Kluge (GER) | NetApp–Endura | + 10" |
| 5 | Andrew Fenn (GBR) | Omega Pharma–Quick-Step | + 10" |
| 6 | Francesco Lasca (ITA) | Caja Rural–Seguros RGA | + 10" |
| 7 | Danilo Napolitano (ITA) | Accent Jobs–Wanty | + 10" |
| 8 | Grzegorz Stepniak (POL) | CCC–Polsat–Polkowice | + 10" |
| 9 | Edwin Ávila (COL) | Colombia | + 10" |
| 10 | Sacha Modolo (ITA) | Bardiani Valvole–CSF Inox | + 10" |

=== Stage 2 ===
22 April 2013 – Alanya to Antalya, 150 km (93.2 mi)

Stage 2 results

| | Cyclist | Team | Time |
|---|---|---|---|
| 1 | Aidis Kruopis (LIT) | Orica–GreenEDGE | 3h 23' 54" |
| 2 | Marco Coledan (ITA) | Bardiani Valvole–CSF Inox | s.t. |
| 3 | André Greipel (GER) | Lotto–Belisol | s.t. |
| 4 | Sergiy Grechyn (UKR) | Torku Şekerspor | s.t. |
| 5 | Alexander Porsev (RUS) | Team Katusha | s.t. |
| 6 | Leigh Howard (AUS) | Orica–GreenEDGE | s.t. |
| 7 | Vicente Reynes Mimo (ESP) | Lotto–Belisol | s.t. |
| 8 | Maximiliano Richeze (ARG) | Lampre–Merida | s.t. |
| 9 | Mateusz Nowak (POL) | CCC–Polsat–Polkowice | s.t. |
| 10 | Filippo Fortin (ITA) | Bardiani Valvole–CSF Inox | s.t. |

General Classification after Stage 2

| | Cyclist | Team | Time |
|---|---|---|---|
| 1 | André Greipel (GER) | Lotto–Belisol | 6h 32' 21" |
| 2 | Marcel Kittel (GER) | Argos–Shimano | + 0" |
| 3 | Aidis Kruopis (LIT) | Orica–GreenEDGE | + 0" |
| 4 | Marco Coledan (ITA) | Bardiani Valvole–CSF Inox | + 4" |
| 5 | Yuriy Metlushenko (UKR) | Torku Şekerspor | + 6" |
| 6 | Maximiliano Richeze (ARG) | Lampre–Merida | + 10" |
| 7 | Leigh Howard (AUS) | Orica–GreenEDGE | + 10" |
| 8 | Roger Kluge (GER) | NetApp–Endura | + 10" |
| 9 | Andrew Fenn (GBR) | Omega Pharma–Quick-Step | + 10" |
| 10 | Francesco Lasca (ITA) | Caja Rural–Seguros RGA | + 10" |

=== Stage 3 ===
23 April 2013 – Antalya to Elmalı, 153.5 km (95.4 mi)

Stage 3 results

| | Cyclist | Team | Time |
|---|---|---|---|
| 1 | Natnael Berhane (ERI) | Team Europcar | 4h 16' 06" |
| 2 | Kevin Seeldraeyers (BEL) | Astana | + 6" |
| 3 | Mustafa Sayar (TUR) | Torku Şekerspor | + 6" |
| 4 | Maxime Méderel (FRA) | Sojasun | + 16" |
| 5 | Yoann Bagot (FRA) | Cofidis | + 24" |
| 6 | Rory Sutherland (AUS) | Saxo–Tinkoff | + 24" |
| 7 | Cameron Meyer (AUS) | Orica–GreenEDGE | + 24" |
| 8 | Florian Guillou (FRA) | Bretagne–Séché Environnement | + 28" |
| 9 | Darwin Atapuma (COL) | Colombia | + 30" |
| 10 | Nicolas Edet (FRA) | Cofidis | + 33" |

General Classification after Stage 3

| | Cyclist | Team | Time |
|---|---|---|---|
| 1 | Natnael Berhane (ERI) | Team Europcar | 10h 48' 27" |
| 2 | Kevin Seeldraeyers (BEL) | Astana | + 10" |
| 3 | Mustafa Sayar (TUR) | Torku Şekerspor | + 12" |
| 4 | Maxime Méderel (FRA) | Sojasun | + 26" |
| 5 | Rory Sutherland (AUS) | Saxo–Tinkoff | + 34" |
| 6 | Yoann Bagot (FRA) | Cofidis | + 34" |
| 7 | Cameron Meyer (AUS) | Orica–GreenEDGE | + 34" |
| 8 | Florian Guillou (FRA) | Bretagne–Séché Environnement | + 38" |
| 9 | Darwin Atapuma (COL) | Colombia | + 40" |
| 10 | Nicolas Edet (FRA) | Cofidis | + 43" |

=== Stage 4 ===
24 April 2013 – Göcek to Marmaris, 147 km (91.3 mi)

Stage 4 results

| | Cyclist | Team | Time |
|---|---|---|---|
| 1 | André Greipel (GER) | Lotto–Belisol | 3h 38' 47" |
| 2 | Nikias Arndt (GER) | Argos–Shimano | s.t. |
| 3 | Moreno Hofland (NED) | Blanco Pro Cycling | s.t. |
| 4 | Filippo Pozzato (ITA) | Lampre–Merida | s.t. |
| 5 | Michał Gołaś (POL) | Omega Pharma–Quick-Step | s.t. |
| 6 | Francesco Lasca (ITA) | Caja Rural–Seguros RGA | s.t. |
| 7 | Geoffroy Lequatre (FRA) | Bretagne–Séché Environnement | s.t. |
| 8 | Nicolas Edet (FRA) | Cofidis | s.t. |
| 9 | Jonathan Hivert (FRA) | Sojasun | s.t. |
| 10 | Serge Pauwels (BEL) | Omega Pharma–Quick-Step | s.t. |

General Classification after Stage 4

| | Cyclist | Team | Time |
|---|---|---|---|
| 1 | Natnael Berhane (ERI) | Team Europcar | 14h 27' 14" |
| 2 | Kevin Seeldraeyers (BEL) | Astana | + 10" |
| 3 | Mustafa Sayar (TUR) | Torku Şekerspor | + 12" |
| 4 | Maxime Méderel (FRA) | Sojasun | + 26" |
| 5 | Rory Sutherland (AUS) | Saxo–Tinkoff | + 34" |
| 6 | Yoann Bagot (FRA) | Cofidis | + 34" |
| 7 | Cameron Meyer (AUS) | Orica–GreenEDGE | + 34" |
| 8 | Florian Guillou (FRA) | Bretagne–Séché Environnement | + 38" |
| 9 | Darwin Atapuma (COL) | Colombia | + 40" |
| 10 | Nicolas Edet (FRA) | Cofidis | + 43" |

=== Stage 5 ===
25 April 2013 – Marmaris to Bodrum, 183 km (113.7 mi)

Stage 5 results

| | Cyclist | Team | Time |
|---|---|---|---|
| 1 | André Greipel (GER) | Lotto–Belisol | 4h 41' 59" |
| 2 | Matteo Trentin (ITA) | Omega Pharma–Quick-Step | s.t. |
| 3 | Nikias Arndt (GER) | Argos–Shimano | s.t. |
| 4 | Luca Paolini (ITA) | Team Katusha | s.t. |
| 5 | Stefan van Dijk (NED) | Accent Jobs–Wanty | s.t. |
| 6 | Rafael Andriato (BRA) | Vini Fantini–Selle Italia | s.t. |
| 7 | Armindo Fonseca (FRA) | Bretagne–Séché Environnement | s.t. |
| 8 | Daniel Schorn (AUT) | NetApp–Endura | s.t. |
| 9 | Sonny Colbrelli (ITA) | Bardiani Valvole–CSF Inox | s.t. |
| 10 | Maxime Méderel (FRA) | Sojasun | s.t. |

General Classification after Stage 5

| | Cyclist | Team | Time |
|---|---|---|---|
| 1 | Natnael Berhane (ERI) | Team Europcar | 19h 09' 13" |
| 2 | Kevin Seeldraeyers (BEL) | Astana | + 10" |
| 3 | Mustafa Sayar (TUR) | Torku Şekerspor | + 12" |
| 4 | Maxime Méderel (FRA) | Sojasun | + 26" |
| 5 | Rory Sutherland (AUS) | Saxo–Tinkoff | + 34" |
| 6 | Yoann Bagot (FRA) | Cofidis | + 34" |
| 7 | Cameron Meyer (AUS) | Orica–GreenEDGE | + 34" |
| 8 | Florian Guillou (FRA) | Bretagne–Séché Environnement | + 38" |
| 9 | Darwin Atapuma (COL) | Colombia | + 40" |
| 10 | Nicolas Edet (FRA) | Cofidis | + 43" |

=== Stage 6 ===
26 April 2013 – Bodrum to Selçuk, 183 km (113.7 mi)

Stage 6 results

| | Cyclist | Team | Time |
|---|---|---|---|
| DSQ | ~~Mustafa Sayar (TUR)~~ | Torku Şekerspor | DSQ (4h 40' 09") |
| 1 | Yoann Bagot (FRA) | Cofidis | + 18" |
| 2 | Nicolas Edet (FRA) | Cofidis | + 23" |
| 3 | Danail Petrov (BUL) | Caja Rural–Seguros RGA | + 28" |
| 4 | Darwin Atapuma (COL) | Colombia | + 30" |
| 5 | Jonathan Hivert (FRA) | Sojasun | + 30" |
| 6 | Serge Pauwels (BEL) | Omega Pharma–Quick-Step | + 30" |
| 7 | Cameron Meyer (AUS) | Orica–GreenEDGE | + 30" |
| 8 | Florian Guillou (FRA) | Bretagne–Séché Environnement | + 33" |
| 9 | Marc de Maar (CUW) | UnitedHealthcare | + 33" |

General Classification after Stage 6

| | Cyclist | Team | Time |
|---|---|---|---|
| 1 | Mustafa Sayar (TUR) | Torku Şekerspor | 23h 49' 24" |
| 2 | Natnael Berhane (ERI) | Team Europcar | + 41" |
| 3 | Yoann Bagot (FRA) | Cofidis | + 44" |
| 4 | Maxime Méderel (FRA) | Sojasun | + 57" |
| 5 | Nicolas Edet (FRA) | Cofidis | + 1' 00" |
| 6 | Cameron Meyer (AUS) | Orica–GreenEDGE | + 1' 02" |
| 7 | Darwin Atapuma (COL) | Colombia | + 1' 08" |
| 8 | Florian Guillou (FRA) | Bretagne–Séché Environnement | + 1' 09" |
| 9 | Danail Petrov (BUL) | Caja Rural–Seguros RGA | + 1' 13" |
| 10 | Rory Sutherland (AUS) | Saxo–Tinkoff | + 1' 15" |

=== Stage 7 ===
27 April 2013 – Kuşadası to İzmir, 124 km (77.1 mi)

Stage 7 results

| | Cyclist | Team | Time |
|---|---|---|---|
| 1 | Marcel Kittel (GER) | Argos–Shimano | 2h 40' 04" |
| 2 | Andrea Guardini (ITA) | Astana | s.t. |
| 3 | Maximiliano Richeze (ARG) | Lampre–Merida | s.t. |
| 4 | Bryan Coquard (FRA) | Team Europcar | s.t. |
| 5 | Sonny Colbrelli (ITA) | Bardiani Valvole–CSF Inox | s.t. |
| 6 | Jake Keough (USA) | UnitedHealthcare | s.t. |
| 7 | Francesco Lasca (ITA) | Caja Rural–Seguros RGA | s.t. |
| 8 | Blaž Jarc (SLO) | NetApp–Endura | s.t. |
| 9 | Aidis Kruopis (LTU) | Orica–GreenEDGE | s.t. |
| 10 | Nikolas Maes (BEL) | Omega Pharma–Quick-Step | s.t. |

General Classification after Stage 7

| | Cyclist | Team | Time |
|---|---|---|---|
| 1 | Mustafa Sayar (TUR) | Torku Şekerspor | 26h 29' 28" |
| 2 | Natnael Berhane (ERI) | Team Europcar | + 41" |
| 3 | Yoann Bagot (FRA) | Cofidis | + 44" |
| 4 | Maxime Méderel (FRA) | Sojasun | + 57" |
| 5 | Nicolas Edet (FRA) | Cofidis | + 1' 00" |
| 6 | Cameron Meyer (AUS) | Orica–GreenEDGE | + 1' 02" |
| 7 | Darwin Atapuma (COL) | Colombia | + 1' 08" |
| 8 | Florian Guillou (FRA) | Bretagne–Séché Environnement | + 1' 09" |
| 9 | Danail Petrov (BUL) | Caja Rural–Seguros RGA | + 1' 13" |
| 10 | Rory Sutherland (AUS) | Saxo–Tinkoff | + 1' 15" |

=== Stage 8 ===
28 April 2013 – Istanbul, 121 km (75.2 mi)

Stage 8 results

| | Cyclist | Team | Time |
|---|---|---|---|
| 1 | Marcel Kittel (GER) | Argos–Shimano | 2h 43' 45" |
| 2 | Andrea Guardini (ITA) | Astana | s.t. |
| 3 | Andrew Fenn (GBR) | Omega Pharma–Quick-Step | s.t. |
| 4 | Aidis Kruopis (LTU) | Orica–GreenEDGE | s.t. |
| 5 | Stefan van Dijk (NED) | Accent Jobs–Wanty | s.t. |
| 6 | Moreno Hofland (NED) | Blanco Pro Cycling | s.t. |
| 7 | Francesco Lasca (ITA) | Caja Rural–Seguros RGA | s.t. |
| 8 | Maximiliano Richeze (ARG) | Lampre–Merida | s.t. |
| 9 | Andrea Palini (ITA) | Lampre–Merida | s.t. |
| 10 | André Greipel (GER) | Lotto–Belisol | s.t. |

General Classification after Stage 8

| | Cyclist | Team | Time |
|---|---|---|---|
| DSQ | ~~Mustafa Sayar (TUR)~~ | Torku Şekerspor | DSQ (29h 13' 13") |
| 1 | Natnael Berhane (ERI) | Team Europcar | + 41" |
| 2 | Yoann Bagot (FRA) | Cofidis | + 44" |
| 3 | Maxime Méderel (FRA) | Sojasun | + 57" |
| 4 | Nicolas Edet (FRA) | Cofidis | + 1' 00" |
| 5 | Cameron Meyer (AUS) | Orica–GreenEDGE | + 1' 02" |
| 6 | Darwin Atapuma (COL) | Colombia | + 1' 08" |
| 7 | Florian Guillou (FRA) | Bretagne–Séché Environnement | + 1' 09" |
| 8 | Danail Petrov (BUL) | Caja Rural–Seguros RGA | + 1' 13" |
| 9 | Rory Sutherland (AUS) | Saxo–Tinkoff | + 1' 15" |

== Classification leadership ==
| Stage | Winner | General Classification | Points Classification | Mountains Classification | Turkish Beauties Classification | Team Classification |
|---|---|---|---|---|---|---|
| 1 | Marcel Kittel | Marcel Kittel | Marcel Kittel | Mustafa Sayar | Mikhail Ignatiev | Lampre–Merida |
| 2 | Aidis Kruopis | André Greipel | André Greipel | Mustafa Sayar | Ahmet Örken | Lampre–Merida |
| 3 | Natnael Berhane | Natnael Berhane | André Greipel | Mauro Finetto | Ahmet Örken | Cofidis |
| 4 | André Greipel | Natnael Berhane | André Greipel | Sergiy Grechyn | Mikhail Ignatiev | Cofidis |
| 5 | André Greipel | Natnael Berhane | André Greipel | Sergiy Grechyn | Mikhail Ignatiev | Cofidis |
| 6 | ~~Mustafa Sayar~~; Yoann Bagot | Mustafa Sayar | André Greipel | Sergiy Grechyn | Mikhail Ignatiev | Cofidis |
| 7 | Marcel Kittel | Mustafa Sayar | André Greipel | Sergiy Grechyn | Mikhail Ignatiev | Cofidis |
| 8 | Marcel Kittel | Mustafa Sayar | André Greipel | Sergiy Grechyn | Mikhail Ignatiev | Cofidis |
| Final | | ~~Mustafa Sayar~~; Natnael Berhane | André Greipel | Sergiy Grechyn | Mikhail Ignatiev | Cofidis |
