= 2010 Tour of Hainan =

Race details
- Dates: 11—19 October
- Stages: 9
- Distance: 1,477 km (917.8 mi)
- Winning time: 26h49'23"

Results
Jersey awarded to the overall winner	Winner	Valentin Iglinskiy (KAZ)	(Astana)
	Second	Johnnie Walker (AUS)	(Footon–Servetto–Fuji)
	Third	Alexei Markov (RUS)	(Russian Federation [National team])
Jersey awarded to the points classification winner	Points	Valentin Iglinskiy (KAZ)	(Astana)
Jersey awarded to the mountains classification winner	Mountains	Arkaitz Duran (ESP)	(Footon–Servetto–Fuji)
	Team	Russian Federation (National Team)	

The 2010 Tour of Hainan is the fifth edition. The sixth stage was cancelled after a few kilometres of racing because of heavy rains and flash flooding on some of the roads of the stage.

== Stages ==
=== Stage 1 ===
11 October 2010 – Sanya, 85,2 km

Stage and General classification after Stage 1

	Cyclist	Team	Time
1	Yuri Metlushenko (UKR)	Ukraine (National team)	1h31'37"
2	Kenny Van Hummel (NED)	Skil–Shimano	s.t.
3	Michele Merlo (ITA)	Footon–Servetto–Fuji	s.t.
4	Valentin Iglinskiy (KAZ)	Astana	s.t.
5	Kazuhiro Mori (JPN)	Aisan Racing Team	s.t.

=== Stage 2 ===
12 October 2010 – Sanya to Wuzhishan, 167.5 km

Stage 2 Result

	Cyclist	Team	Time
1	Valentin Iglinskiy (KAZ)	Astana	4h28'23"
2	Taiji Nishitani (JPN)	Aisan Racing Team	s.t.
3	Johnnie Walker (AUS)	Footon–Servetto–Fuji	s.t.
4	Volodymyr Bileka (UKR)	Ukraine (National team)	s.t.
5	Alexei Markov (RUS)	Russian Federation (National team)	s.t.

General classification after Stage 2

	Rider	Team	Time
1	Valentin Iglinskiy (KAZ)	Astana	6h00'00"
2	Taiji Nishitani (JPN)	Aisan Racing Team	+ 4"
3	Johnnie Walker (AUS)	Footon–Servetto–Fuji	+ 6"
4	Adrian Honkisz (POL)	CCC–Polsat–Polkowice	+ 9"
5	Kazuhiro Mori (JPN)	Aisan Racing Team	+ 10"

=== Stage 3 ===
13 October 2010 – Wuzhishan to Xinglong, 146.4 km

Stage 3 Result

	Cyclist	Team	Time
1	Brad Huff (USA)	Jelly Belly–Kenda	3h45'56"
2	Sergey Kudentsov (RUS)	Polygon Sweet Nice	s.t.
3	Yuri Metlushenko (UKR)	Ukraine (National team)	s.t.
4	Jonathan Cantwell (AUS)	Fly V Australia	s.t.
5	Kenny Van Hummel (NED)	Skil–Shimano	s.t.

General classification after Stage 3

	Rider	Team	Time
1	Valentin Iglinskiy (KAZ)	Astana	9h45'56"
2	Taiji Nishitani (JPN)	Aisan Racing Team	+ 4"
3	Johnnie Walker (AUS)	Footon–Servetto–Fuji	+ 6"
4	Arkaitz Durán (ESP)	Footon–Servetto–Fuji	+ 7"
5	Kiel Reijnen (USA)	Jelly Belly–Kenda	+ 8"

=== Stage 4 ===
14 October 2010 – Xinglong to Wenchang, 162,9 km

Stage 4 Result

	Cyclist	Team	Time
1	Kenny Van Hummel (NED)	Skil–Shimano	2h19'37"
2	Valentin Iglinskiy (KAZ)	Astana	s.t.
3	Ivan Kovalev (RUS)	Russian Federation (National team)	s.t.
4	Dene Rogers (NZL)	Giant Asia Racing team	s.t.
5	Yuri Metlushenko (UKR)	Ukraine (National team)	s.t.

General classification after Stage 4

	Rider	Team	Time
1	Valentin Iglinskiy (KAZ)	Astana	12h05'21"
2	Johnnie Walker (AUS)	Footon–Servetto–Fuji	+ 15"
3	Taiji Nishitani (JPN)	Aisan Racing Team	+ 16"
4	Enrique Mata (ESP)	Footon–Servetto–Fuji	+ 17"
5	Kiel Reijnen (USA)	Jelly Belly–Kenda	+ 18"

=== Stage 5 ===
15 October 2010 – Wenchang to Haikou, 156,8 km

Stage 5 Result

	Cyclist	Team	Time
1	Kenny Van Hummel (NED)	Skil–Shimano	3h26'45"
2	Ivan Kovalev (RUS)	Russian Federation (National team)	s.t.
3	Jonathan Cantwell (AUS)	Fly V Australia	s.t.
4	Alexei Markov (RUS)	Russian Federation (National team)	s.t.
5	Brad Huff (USA)	Jelly Belly–Kenda	s.t.

General classification after Stage 5

	Rider	Team	Time
1	Valentin Iglinskiy (KAZ)	Astana	15h31'58"
2	Johnnie Walker (AUS)	Footon–Servetto–Fuji	+ 20"
3	Kiel Reijnen (USA)	Jelly Belly–Kenda	+ 23"
4	Ruslan Tleubayev (KAZ)	Kazakhstan (National team)	+ 27"
5	Yukihiro Doi (JPN)	Skil–Shimano	+ 27"

=== Stage 6 ===
16 October 2010 – Haikou to Chengmai, 164,6 km

The stage was cancelled.

=== Stage 7 ===
17 October 2010 – Chengmai to Danzhou, 172,8 km

The organisation decided to shorten the stage because of heavy rainfalls. The race was started only 64 km before the original finish.

Stage 7 Result

	Cyclist	Team	Time
1	Kenny Van Hummel (NED)	Skil–Shimano	1h25'22"
2	Bartlomiej Matysiak (POL)	CCC–Polsat–Polkowice	s.t.
3	Yuri Metlushenko (UKR)	Ukraine (National team)	s.t.
4	Valentin Iglinskiy (KAZ)	Astana	s.t.
5	Michele Merlo (ITA)	Footon–Servetto–Fuji	s.t.

General classification after Stage 7

	Rider	Team	Time
1	Valentin Iglinskiy (KAZ)	Astana	16h57'20"
2	Johnnie Walker (AUS)	Footon–Servetto–Fuji	+ 19"
3	Kiel Reijnen (USA)	Jelly Belly–Kenda	+ 21"
4	Ruslan Tleubayev (KAZ)	Kazakhstan (National team)	+ 27"
5	Yukihiro Doi (JPN)	Skil–Shimano	+ 27"

=== Stage 8 ===
18 October 2010 – Danzhou to Dongfang, 194,6 km

Kenny van Hummel crossed the finishline first to win his fourth stage, but the jury relegated him, and Markov became the winner.

Stage 8 Result

	Cyclist	Team	Time
1	Alexei Markov (RUS)	Russian Federation (National team)	4h35'37"
2	Brad Huff (USA)	Jelly Belly–Kenda	s.t.
3	Ivan Kovalev (RUS)	Russian Federation (National team)	s.t.
4	Valentin Iglinskiy (KAZ)	Astana	s.t.
5	Bartlomiej Matysiak (POL)	CCC–Polsat–Polkowice	s.t.

General classification after Stage 8

	Rider	Team	Time
1	Valentin Iglinskiy (KAZ)	Astana	21h32'57"
2	Johnnie Walker (AUS)	Footon–Servetto–Fuji	+ 19"
3	Alexei Markov (RUS)	Russian Federation (National team)	+ 20"
4	Kiel Reijnen (USA)	Jelly Belly–Kenda	+ 21"
5	Tomasz Marczynski (POL)	CCC–Polsat–Polkowice	+ 21"

=== Stage 9 ===
19 October 2010 – Dongfang to Sanya, 226,1 km

Stage 9 Result

	Cyclist	Team	Time
1	Kenny Van Hummel (NED)	Skil–Shimano	5h16'26"
2	Sergey Kudentsov (RUS)	Polygon Sweet Nice	s.t.
3	Enrique Mata (ESP)	Footon–Servetto–Fuji	s.t.
4	Vidal Celis (ESP)	Footon–Servetto–Fuji	s.t.
5	Taiji Nishitani (JPN)	Aisan Racing Team	s.t.

General classification after Stage 9

	Rider	Team	Time
1	Valentin Iglinskiy (KAZ)	Astana	26h49'23"
2	Johnnie Walker (AUS)	Footon–Servetto–Fuji	+ 17"
3	Alexei Markov (RUS)	Russian Federation (National team)	+ 18"
4	Kiel Reijnen (USA)	Jelly Belly–Kenda	+ 21"
5	Tomasz Marczynski (POL)	CCC–Polsat–Polkowice	+ 21"

== Leadership classification ==
Stage	Winner	General classification	Points classification	Mountains Classification	Team Classification
1	Yuri Metlushenko	Yuri Metlushenko	Yuri Metlushenko	no award	Ukraine (National team)
2	Valentin Iglinskiy	Valentin Iglinskiy	Valentin Iglinskiy	Arkaitz Durán	Footon–Servetto–Fuji
3	Brad Huff	Valentin Iglinskiy	Valentin Iglinskiy	Arkaitz Durán	Footon–Servetto–Fuji
4	Kenny Van Hummel	Valentin Iglinskiy	Valentin Iglinskiy	Arkaitz Durán	Footon–Servetto–Fuji
5	Kenny Van Hummel	Valentin Iglinskiy	Valentin Iglinskiy	Arkaitz Durán	Russian Federation (National team)
6	NOT RACED	Valentin Iglinskiy	Valentin Iglinskiy	Arkaitz Durán	Russian Federation (National team)
7	Kenny Van Hummel	Valentin Iglinskiy	Valentin Iglinskiy	Arkaitz Durán	Russian Federation (National team)
8	Alexei Markov	Valentin Iglinskiy	Valentin Iglinskiy	Arkaitz Durán	Footon–Servetto–Fuji
9	Kenny Van Hummel	Valentin Iglinskiy	Valentin Iglinskiy	Arkaitz Durán	Russian Federation (National team)
Final		Valentin Iglinskiy	Valentin Iglinskiy	Arkaitz Duran	Russian Federation (National team)

== Final standings ==
=== General classification ===
	Rider	Team	Time
1	Valentin Iglinskiy (KAZ)	Astana	26h49'23"
2	Johnnie Walker (AUS)	Footon–Servetto–Fuji	+ 17"
3	Alexei Markov (RUS)	Russian Federation (National team)	+ 18"
4	Kiel Reijnen (USA)	Jelly Belly–Kenda	+ 21"
5	Tomasz Marczynski (POL)	CCC–Polsat–Polkowice	+ 21"
6	Matthias Bertling (GER)	Team Kuota-Indeland	+ 23″
7	Ruslan Tleubayev (KAZ)	Kazakhstan (National team)	+ 25"
8	Yukihiro Doi (JPN)	Skil–Shimano	+ 27"
9	Alexander Schmitt (GER)	Team Kuota-Indeland	+ 30"
10	Volodymyr Bileka (UKR)	Ukraine (National team)	+ 30"

=== Teams classification ===
#	Team	Time
1	Russian Federation (National team)	80h 29' 45"
2	Astana	+ 4"
3	Skil–Shimano	+ 6"
4	Footon–Servetto–Fuji	+ 18"
5	Giant Asia Racing Team	+ 30"
6	Aisan Racing Team	+ 36"
7	CCC–Polsat–Polkowice	+ 2' 14"
8	Ukraine (National team)	+ 2' 14"
9	Team Kuota-Indeland	+ 2' 14"
10	Jelly Belly–Kenda	+ 2' 19"

=== Points classification ===
	Rider	Team	Points
1	Valentin Iglinskiy (KAZ)	Astana	98
2	Kenny Van Hummel (NED)	Skil–Shimano	89
3	Yuri Metlushenko (UKR)	Ukraine (National team)	74
4	Sergey Kudentsov (RUS)	Polygon Sweet Nice	73
5	Ivan Kovalev (RUS)	Russian Federation (National team)	61
6	Alexei Markov (RUS)	Russian Federation (National team)	56
7	Jonathan Cantwell (AUS)	Fly V Australia	50
8	Michele Merlo (ITA)	Footon–Servetto–Fuji	48
9	Brad Huff (USA)	Jelly Belly–Kenda	45
10	Enrique Mata (ESP)	Footon–Servetto–Fuji	42

=== Mountains classification ===
	Rider	Team	Points
1	Arkaitz Duran (ESP)	Footon–Servetto–Fuji	13
2	Tomasz Marczynski (POL)	CCC–Polsat–Polkowice	11
3	Ghader Mizbani (IRI)	Tabriz Petrochemical Cycling Team	10
4	Kiel Reijnen (USA)	Jelly Belly–Kenda	9
5	Mehdi Sohrabi (IRI)	Tabriz Petrochemical Cycling Team	6
6	Daniel Westmattelmann (GER)	Team Kuota-Indeland	5
7	Adrian Honkisz (POL)	CCC–Polsat–Polkowice	5
8	Volodymyr Starchyk (UKR)	Ukraine (National team)	5
9	Valentin Iglinskiy (KAZ)	Astana	4
10	Sylwester Janiszewski (POL)	CCC–Polsat–Polkowice	4
