= Iglinsky =

Iglinsky (Russian: Иглинский; masculine) or Iglinskaya (Иглинская; feminine) is a last name. It is shared by the following people:

- Maxim Iglinsky (b. 1981), road racing cyclist from Kazakhstan
- Valentin Iglinsky (b. 1984), road racing cyclist from Kazakhstan
