= 2014 Tour of Hainan =

2013–14 UCI Asia Tour

Race details
- Dates: 20–28 October 2014
- Stages: 9
- Distance: 1,467.1 km (911.6 mi)
- Winning time: 35h 02' 00"

Results
Jersey awarded to the overall winner	Winner	Julien Antomarchi (FRA)	(Team La Pomme Marseille 13)
	Second	Niccolò Bonifazio (ITA)	(Lampre–Merida)
	Third	Andrey Zeits (KAZ)	(Astana)
Jersey awarded to the points classification winner	Points	Niccolò Bonifazio (ITA)	(Lampre–Merida)
Jersey awarded to the mountains classification winner	Mountains	Sergiy Grechyn (UKR)	(Ukraine (national team))
Jersey awarded to the team classification winner	Team	Team La Pomme Marseille 13	

The 2014 Tour of Hainan was the 9th edition of the Tour of Hainan, an annual professional road bicycle racing stage race held in China. The race was rated by the Union Cycliste Internationale (UCI) as a 2.HC (hors category) race, held as part of the 2013–14 UCI Asia Tour.

== Teams ==
Twenty teams competed in the 2014 Tour of Hainan. These included three UCI ProTeams, three UCI Professional Continental, twelve UCI Continental teams and two national teams.

The teams that participated in the race were:

- ASC Dukla Praha
- Astana
- Belkin Pro Cycling
- Burgos BH
- CCC–Polsat–Polkowice
- China Hainan HNB Yindongli
- Drapac Professional Cycling
- Giant–Champion System
- Hengxiang Cycling Team
- Hong Kong (national team)
- Team La Pomme Marseille 13
- Lampre–Merida
- Team Novo Nordisk
- Qinghai Tianyoude Cycling Team
- RTS–Santic Racing Team
- Synergy Baku
- Terengganu Cycling Team
- Torku Şekerspor
- Ukraine (national team)
- Vino 4ever

== Route ==
Stage characteristics and winners
Stage	Date	Course	Distance	Type	Winner
1	20 October	Chengmai to Chengmai	85.4 km (53 mi)	Flat stage	Moreno Hofland (NED)
2	21 October	Chengmai to Haikou	207.2 km (129 mi)	Flat stage	Niccolò Bonifazio (ITA)
3	22 October	Haikou to Yueliangwan	134.7 km (84 mi)	Flat stage	Arman Kamyshev (KAZ)
4	23 October	Wenchang to Xinglong	145.8 km (91 mi)	Flat stage	Julien Antomarchi (FRA)
5	24 October	Wanning to Sanya	192.8 km (120 mi)	Flat stage	Andrea Palini (ITA)
6	25 October	Sanya to Dongfang	182.1 km (113 mi)	Flat stage	Niccolò Bonifazio (ITA)
7	26 October	Dongfang to Wuzhishan	199.3 km (124 mi)	Medium-mountain stage	Julien Antomarchi (FRA)
8	27 October	Wuzhishan to Danzhou	154.1 km (96 mi)	Hilly stage	Niccolò Bonifazio (ITA)
9	28 October	Danzhou to Chengmai	165.7 km (103 mi)	Flat stage	Wouter Wippert (NED)

== Stages ==
=== Stage 1 ===
20 October 2014 — Chengmai to Chengmai, 85.4 km (53 mi)

Stage 1 result
Rank	Rider	Team	Time
1	Moreno Hofland (NED)	Belkin Pro Cycling	1h 56' 30"
2	Andrea Palini (ITA)	Lampre–Merida	+ 0"
3	Ondřej Rybín (CZE)	ASC Dukla Praha	+ 0"
4	Niccolò Bonifazio (ITA)	Lampre–Merida	+ 0"
5	Graeme Brown (AUS)	Belkin Pro Cycling	+ 0"
6	Roberto Ferrari (ITA)	Lampre–Merida	+ 0"
7	Alois Kaňkovský (CZE)	ASC Dukla Praha	+ 0"
8	Wouter Wippert (NED)	Drapac Professional Cycling	+ 0"
9	Arman Kamyshev (KAZ)	Astana	+ 0"
10	Milan Kadlec (CZE)	ASC Dukla Praha	+ 0"

General classification after stage 1
Rank	Rider	Team	Time
1	Moreno Hofland (NED)	Belkin Pro Cycling	1h 56' 20"
2	Andrea Palini (ITA)	Lampre–Merida	+ 4"
3	Ondřej Rybín (CZE)	ASC Dukla Praha	+ 6"
4	Darío Hernández (ESP)	Burgos BH	+ 6"
5	Elchin Asadov (AZE)	Synergy Baku	+ 7"
6	Martin Bláha (CZE)	ASC Dukla Praha	+ 7"
7	Ma Guangtong (CHN)	Hengxiang Cycling Team	+ 8"
8	Niccolò Bonifazio (ITA)	Lampre–Merida	+ 10"
9	Graeme Brown (AUS)	Belkin Pro Cycling	+ 10"
10	Roberto Ferrari (ITA)	Lampre–Merida	+ 10"

=== Stage 2 ===
21 October 2014 — Chengmai to Haikou, 207.2 km (129 mi)

Stage 2 result
Rank	Rider	Team	Time
1	Niccolò Bonifazio (ITA)	Lampre–Merida	5h 04' 50"
2	Wouter Wippert (NED)	Drapac Professional Cycling	+ 0"
3	Andrea Palini (ITA)	Lampre–Merida	+ 0"
4	Jonathan Cantwell (AUS)	Drapac Professional Cycling	+ 0"
5	Yuriy Metlushenko (UKR)	Ukraine (national team)	+ 0"
6	Moreno Hofland (NED)	Belkin Pro Cycling	+ 0"
7	Ondřej Rybín (CZE)	ASC Dukla Praha	+ 0"
8	Ruslan Tleubayev (KAZ)	Astana	+ 0"
9	Boris Shpilevsky (RUS)	RTS–Santic Racing Team	+ 0"
10	Harrif Saleh (MYS)	Terengganu Cycling Team	+ 0"

General classification after stage 2
Rank	Rider	Team	Time
1	Niccolò Bonifazio (ITA)	Lampre–Merida	7h 01' 10"
2	Andrea Palini (ITA)	Lampre–Merida	+ 0"
3	Moreno Hofland (NED)	Belkin Pro Cycling	+ 0"
4	Wang Meiyin (CHN)	Hengxiang Cycling Team	+ 1"
5	Wouter Wippert (NED)	Drapac Professional Cycling	+ 4"
6	Oleksandr Surutkovych (UKR)	Synergy Baku	+ 5"
7	Ondřej Rybín (CZE)	ASC Dukla Praha	+ 6"
8	Darío Hernández (ESP)	Burgos BH	+ 6"
9	Elchin Asadov (AZE)	Synergy Baku	+ 7"
10	Martin Bláha (CZE)	ASC Dukla Praha	+ 7"

=== Stage 3 ===
22 October 2014 — Haikou to Yueliangwan, 134.7 km (84 mi)

Stage 3 result
Rank	Rider	Team	Time
1	Arman Kamyshev (KAZ)	Astana	3h 05' 09"
2	Maksym Averin (AZE)	Synergy Baku	+ 0"
3	Wouter Wippert (NED)	Drapac Professional Cycling	+ 0"
4	Yuriy Metlushenko (UKR)	Ukraine (national team)	+ 0"
5	Andrea Palini (ITA)	Lampre–Merida	+ 0"
6	Moreno Hofland (NED)	Belkin Pro Cycling	+ 0"
7	Boris Shpilevsky (RUS)	RTS–Santic Racing Team	+ 0"
8	Niccolò Bonifazio (ITA)	Lampre–Merida	+ 0"
9	Alois Kaňkovský (CZE)	ASC Dukla Praha	+ 0"
10	Ruslan Tleubayev (KAZ)	Astana	+ 0"

General classification after stage 3
Rank	Rider	Team	Time
1	Wang Meiyin (CHN)	Hengxiang Cycling Team	10h 06' 17"
2	Andrea Palini (ITA)	Lampre–Merida	+ 2"
3	Wouter Wippert (NED)	Drapac Professional Cycling	+ 2"
4	Moreno Hofland (NED)	Belkin Pro Cycling	+ 2"
5	Niccolò Bonifazio (ITA)	Lampre–Merida	+ 2"
6	Arman Kamyshev (KAZ)	Astana	+ 2"
7	Maksym Averin (AZE)	Synergy Baku	+ 6"
8	Oleksandr Surutkovych (UKR)	Synergy Baku	+ 6"
9	Darío Hernández (ESP)	Burgos BH	+ 8"
10	Harrif Saleh (MYS)	Terengganu Cycling Team	+ 9"

=== Stage 4 ===
23 October 2014 — Wenchang to Xinglong, 145.8 km (91 mi)

Stage 4 result
Rank	Rider	Team	Time
1	Julien Antomarchi (FRA)	Team La Pomme Marseille 13	3h 15' 59"
2	Andrea Palini (ITA)	Lampre–Merida	+ 2"
3	Niccolò Bonifazio (ITA)	Lampre–Merida	+ 2"
4	Ruslan Tleubayev (KAZ)	Astana	+ 2"
5	Wouter Wippert (NED)	Drapac Professional Cycling	+ 2"
6	Barry Markus (NED)	Belkin Pro Cycling	+ 2"
7	Mohammad Saufi Mat Senan (MYS)	Terengganu Cycling Team	+ 2"
8	Justin Jules (FRA)	Team La Pomme Marseille 13	+ 2"
9	Harrif Saleh (MYS)	Terengganu Cycling Team	+ 2"
10	Ondřej Rybín (CZE)	ASC Dukla Praha	+ 2"

General classification after stage 4
Rank	Rider	Team	Time
1	Julien Antomarchi (FRA)	Team La Pomme Marseille 13	13h 22' 10"
2	Andrea Palini (ITA)	Lampre–Merida	+ 4"
3	Niccolò Bonifazio (ITA)	Lampre–Merida	+ 6"
4	Wang Meiyin (CHN)	Hengxiang Cycling Team	+ 8"
5	Wouter Wippert (NED)	Drapac Professional Cycling	+ 10"
6	Moreno Hofland (NED)	Belkin Pro Cycling	+ 10"
7	Arman Kamyshev (KAZ)	Astana	+ 10"
8	Samir Jabrayilov (AZE)	Synergy Baku	+ 13"
9	Oleksandr Surutkovych (UKR)	Synergy Baku	+ 14"
10	Maksym Averin (AZE)	Synergy Baku	+ 14"

=== Stage 5 ===
24 October 2014 — Wanning to Sanya, 192.8 km (120 mi)

Stage 5 result
Rank	Rider	Team	Time
1	Andrea Palini (ITA)	Lampre–Merida	4h 32' 51"
2	Niccolò Bonifazio (ITA)	Lampre–Merida	+ 0"
3	Ruslan Tleubayev (KAZ)	Astana	+ 0"
4	Arman Kamyshev (KAZ)	Astana	+ 0"
5	Stepan Astafyev (KAZ)	Vino 4ever	+ 0"
6	Nick van der Lijke (NED)	Belkin Pro Cycling	+ 0"
7	Jordan Kerby (AUS)	Drapac Professional Cycling	+ 0"
8	Elchin Asadov (AZE)	Synergy Baku	+ 0"
9	Vladimir Zagorodniy (UKR)	Ukraine (national team)	+ 0"
10	Samir Jabrayilov (AZE)	Synergy Baku	+ 0"

General classification after stage 5
Rank	Rider	Team	Time
1	Andrea Palini (ITA)	Lampre–Merida	17h 54' 55"
2	Niccolò Bonifazio (ITA)	Lampre–Merida	+ 6"
3	Julien Antomarchi (FRA)	Team La Pomme Marseille 13	+ 6"
4	Wang Meiyin (CHN)	Hengxiang Cycling Team	+ 14"
5	Arman Kamyshev (KAZ)	Astana	+ 16"
6	Samir Jabrayilov (AZE)	Synergy Baku	+ 19"
7	Ruslan Tleubayev (KAZ)	Astana	+ 22"
8	Elchin Asadov (AZE)	Synergy Baku	+ 23"
9	Sergiy Grechyn (UKR)	Ukraine (national team)	+ 23"
10	Łukasz Owsian (POL)	CCC–Polsat–Polkowice	+ 25"

=== Stage 6 ===
25 October 2014 — Sanya to Dongfang, 182.1 km (113 mi)

Stage 6 result
Rank	Rider	Team	Time
1	Niccolò Bonifazio (ITA)	Lampre–Merida	4h 02' 18"
2	Barry Markus (NED)	Belkin Pro Cycling	+ 0"
3	Wouter Wippert (NED)	Drapac Professional Cycling	+ 0"
4	Justin Jules (FRA)	Team La Pomme Marseille 13	+ 0"
5	Alois Kaňkovský (CZE)	ASC Dukla Praha	+ 0"
6	Yuriy Metlushenko (UKR)	Ukraine (national team)	+ 0"
7	Arman Kamyshev (KAZ)	Astana	+ 0"
8	Andrea Peron (ITA)	Team Novo Nordisk	+ 0"
9	Ruslan Tleubayev (KAZ)	Astana	+ 0"
10	Mohammad Saufi Mat Senan (MYS)	Terengganu Cycling Team	+ 0"

General classification after stage 6
Rank	Rider	Team	Time
1	Niccolò Bonifazio (ITA)	Lampre–Merida	21h 57' 09"
2	Andrea Palini (ITA)	Lampre–Merida	+ 4"
3	Julien Antomarchi (FRA)	Team La Pomme Marseille 13	+ 10"
4	Wang Meiyin (CHN)	Hengxiang Cycling Team	+ 18"
5	Arman Kamyshev (KAZ)	Astana	+ 20"
6	Samir Jabrayilov (AZE)	Synergy Baku	+ 23"
7	Ruslan Tleubayev (KAZ)	Astana	+ 26"
8	Elchin Asadov (AZE)	Synergy Baku	+ 27"
9	Sergiy Grechyn (UKR)	Ukraine (national team)	+ 27"
10	Łukasz Owsian (POL)	CCC–Polsat–Polkowice	+ 29"

=== Stage 7 ===
26 October 2014 — Dongfang to Wuzhishan, 199.3 km (124 mi)

Stage 7 result
Rank	Rider	Team	Time
1	Julien Antomarchi (FRA)	Team La Pomme Marseille 13	5h 03' 00"
2	Andrey Zeits (KAZ)	Astana	+ 1"
3	Niccolò Bonifazio (ITA)	Lampre–Merida	+ 39"
4	Julien El Fares (FRA)	Team La Pomme Marseille 13	+ 41"
5	Alexsandr Dyachenko (KAZ)	Astana	+ 41"
6	José Gonçalves (POR)	Team La Pomme Marseille 13	+ 41"
7	Manuele Mori (ITA)	Lampre–Merida	+ 43"
8	Nick van der Lijke (NED)	Belkin Pro Cycling	+ 57"
9	Moisés Dueñas (ESP)	Burgos BH	+ 57"
10	Wang Meiyin (CHN)	Hengxiang Cycling Team	+ 1' 08"

General classification after stage 7
Rank	Rider	Team	Time
1	Julien Antomarchi (FRA)	Team La Pomme Marseille 13	27h 00' 09"
2	Andrey Zeits (KAZ)	Astana	+ 25"
3	Niccolò Bonifazio (ITA)	Lampre–Merida	+ 35"
4	José Gonçalves (POR)	Team La Pomme Marseille 13	+ 1' 08"
5	Julien El Fares (FRA)	Team La Pomme Marseille 13	+ 1' 10"
6	Alexsandr Dyachenko (KAZ)	Astana	+ 1' 11"
7	Manuele Mori (ITA)	Lampre–Merida	+ 1' 13"
8	Wang Meiyin (CHN)	Hengxiang Cycling Team	+ 1' 26"
9	Nick van der Lijke (NED)	Belkin Pro Cycling	+ 1' 27"
10	Moisés Dueñas (ESP)	Burgos BH	+ 1' 27"

=== Stage 8 ===
27 October 2014 — Wuzhishan to Danzhou, 154.1 km (96 mi)

Stage 8 result
Rank	Rider	Team	Time
1	Niccolò Bonifazio (ITA)	Lampre–Merida	3h 52' 13"
2	Jonathan Cantwell (AUS)	Drapac Professional Cycling	+ 0"
3	Andrea Palini (ITA)	Lampre–Merida	+ 0"
4	Roberto Ferrari (ITA)	Lampre–Merida	+ 0"
5	Arman Kamyshev (KAZ)	Astana	+ 0"
6	Graeme Brown (AUS)	Belkin Pro Cycling	+ 0"
7	Justin Jules (FRA)	Team La Pomme Marseille 13	+ 0"
8	Nick van der Lijke (NED)	Belkin Pro Cycling	+ 0"
9	Andrea Peron (ITA)	Team Novo Nordisk	+ 0"
10	Moreno Hofland (NED)	Belkin Pro Cycling	+ 0"

General classification after stage 8
Rank	Rider	Team	Time
1	Julien Antomarchi (FRA)	Team La Pomme Marseille 13	30h 52' 22"
2	Niccolò Bonifazio (ITA)	Lampre–Merida	+ 22"
3	Andrey Zeits (KAZ)	Astana	+ 25"
4	José Gonçalves (POR)	Team La Pomme Marseille 13	+ 1' 06"
5	Julien El Fares (FRA)	Team La Pomme Marseille 13	+ 1' 10"
6	Alexsandr Dyachenko (KAZ)	Astana	+ 1' 11"
7	Manuele Mori (ITA)	Lampre–Merida	+ 1' 13"
8	Wang Meiyin (CHN)	Hengxiang Cycling Team	+ 1' 26"
9	Nick van der Lijke (NED)	Belkin Pro Cycling	+ 1' 27"
10	Moisés Dueñas (ESP)	Burgos BH	+ 1' 27"

=== Stage 9 ===
28 October 2014 — Danzhou to Chengmai, 165.7 km (103 mi)

Stage 9 result
Rank	Rider	Team	Time
1	Wouter Wippert (NED)	Drapac Professional Cycling	4h 09' 38"
2	Adrian Kurek (POL)	CCC–Polsat–Polkowice	+ 0"
3	Taras Voropayev (KAZ)	Vino 4ever	+ 0"
4	Harrif Saleh (MYS)	Terengganu Cycling Team	+ 0"
5	Ho Burr (HKG)	Hong Kong (national team)	+ 0"
6	Roberto Ferrari (ITA)	Lampre–Merida	+ 0"
7	Ruslan Tleubayev (KAZ)	Astana	+ 0"
8	Jonathan Cantwell (AUS)	Drapac Professional Cycling	+ 0"
9	Yuriy Metlushenko (UKR)	Ukraine (national team)	+ 0"
10	Ondřej Rybín (CZE)	ASC Dukla Praha	+ 0"

Final general classification
Rank	Rider	Team	Time
1	Julien Antomarchi (FRA)	Team La Pomme Marseille 13	35h 02' 00"
2	Niccolò Bonifazio (ITA)	Lampre–Merida	+ 22"
3	Andrey Zeits (KAZ)	Astana	+ 25"
4	José Gonçalves (POR)	Team La Pomme Marseille 13	+ 1' 06"
5	Julien El Fares (FRA)	Team La Pomme Marseille 13	+ 1' 10"
6	Alexsandr Dyachenko (KAZ)	Astana	+ 1' 11"
7	Manuele Mori (ITA)	Lampre–Merida	+ 1' 13"
8	Wang Meiyin (CHN)	Hengxiang Cycling Team	+ 1' 26"
9	Nick van der Lijke (NED)	Belkin Pro Cycling	+ 1' 27"
10	Moisés Dueñas (ESP)	Burgos BH	+ 1' 27"

== Classification leadership table ==
Stage	Winner	General classification	Points classification	Asian rider classification	Mountains classification	Team classification
1	Moreno Hofland	Moreno Hofland	Moreno Hofland	Ma Guangtong	Not awarded	Lampre–Merida
2	Niccolò Bonifazio	Niccolò Bonifazio	Niccolò Bonifazio	Wang Meiyin	Not awarded	Lampre–Merida
3	Arman Kamyshev	Wang Meiyin	Andrea Palini	Wang Meiyin	Not awarded	Lampre–Merida
4	Julien Antomarchi	Julien Antomarchi	Andrea Palini	Wang Meiyin	Not awarded	Team La Pomme Marseille 13
5	Andrea Palini	Andrea Palini	Andrea Palini	Wang Meiyin	Sergiy Grechyn	Team La Pomme Marseille 13
6	Niccolò Bonifazio	Niccolò Bonifazio	Niccolò Bonifazio	Wang Meiyin	Sergiy Grechyn	Team La Pomme Marseille 13
7	Julien Antomarchi	Julien Antomarchi	Niccolò Bonifazio	Arman Kamyshev	Sergiy Grechyn	Team La Pomme Marseille 13
8	Niccolò Bonifazio	Julien Antomarchi	Niccolò Bonifazio	Andrey Zeits	Sergiy Grechyn	Team La Pomme Marseille 13
9	Wouter Wippert	Julien Antomarchi	Niccolò Bonifazio	Andrey Zeits	Sergiy Grechyn	Team La Pomme Marseille 13
Final		Julien Antomarchi	Niccolò Bonifazio	Andrey Zeits	Sergiy Grechyn	Team La Pomme Marseille 13
