= Yoann Bagot =

French cyclist (born 1987)

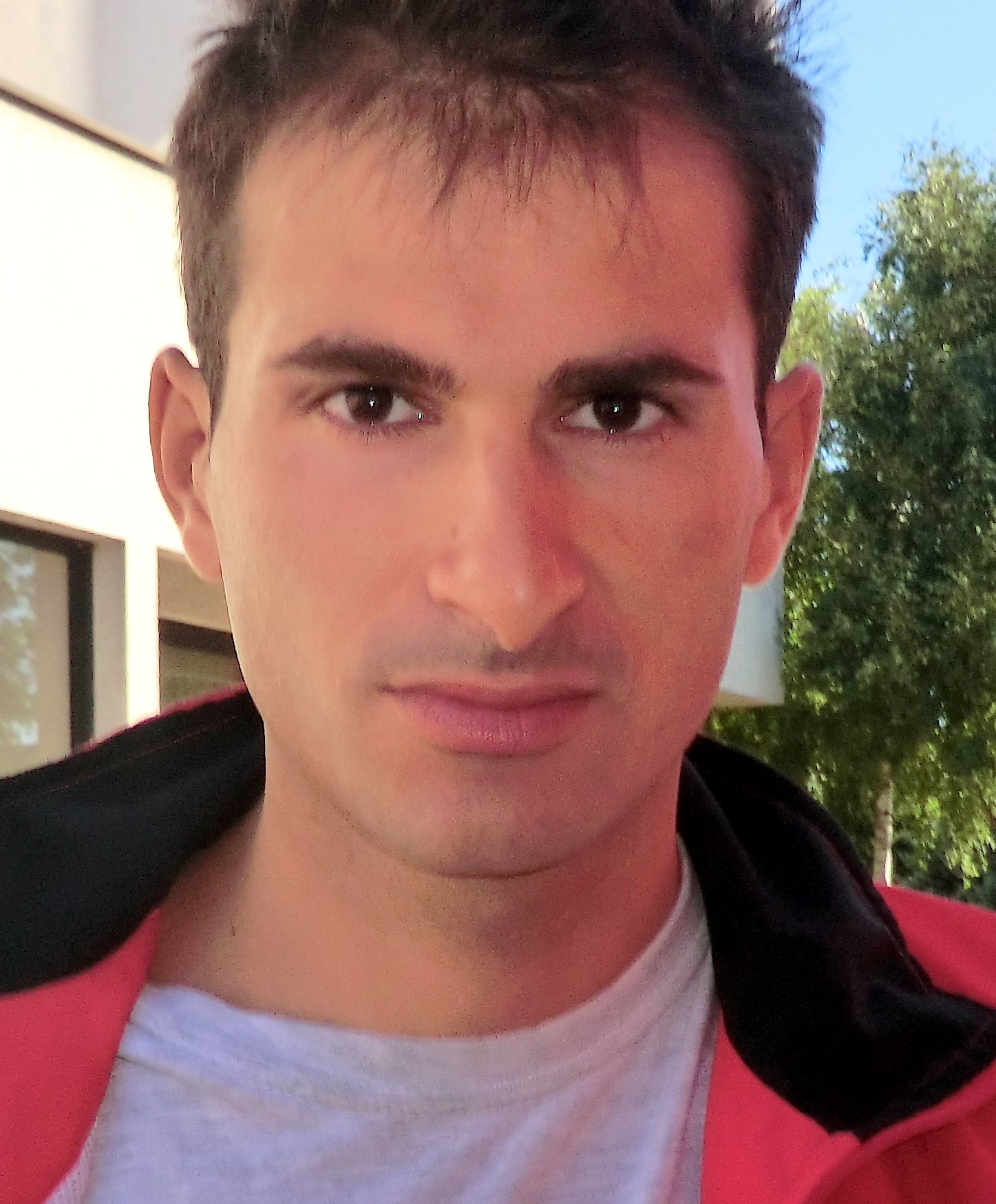
- Bagot at the 2013 Tour de l'Ain

Personal information
- Full name: Yoann Bagot
- Born: 6 September 1987 (age 39) Salon-de-Provence, France
- Height: 1.82 m (6 ft 0 in)
- Weight: 65 kg (143 lb; 10.2 st)

Cycling career
- Sport: Cycling
- Current team: Retired
- Discipline: Road
- Role: Rider
- Rider type: Climber

Amateur teams
- 2007–2010: Vélo-Club La Pomme Marseille
- 2007: Crédit Agricole (stagiaire)
- 2010: Cofidis (stagiaire)

Professional teams
- 2011–2017: Cofidis
- 2018–2019: Vital Concept

Yoann Bagot (French: [joan baɡo]; born 6 September 1987) is a French former professional road bicycle racer, who competed professionally between 2011 and 2019 for the Cofidis and Vital Concept–B&B Hotels teams. He was a member of the Cofidis team that competed at the 2013 Tour de France, where he withdrew in the third stage. His father, Jean-Claude Bagot was also a professional cyclist, best known for winning a stage of the 1987 Giro d'Italia.

== Major results ==
2010
1st Paris–Mantes-en-Yvelines
4th Overall Tour des Pays de Savoie
2012
8th Overall Tour de l'Ain
2013
1st Overall Tour du Gévaudan Languedoc-Roussillon

1st Stage 1

2nd Overall Tour of Turkey (Note: Retroactively promoted from third place, after Mustafa Sayar's results were disqualified.)

1st Stage 6 (Note: Retroactively awarded after Mustafa Sayar's results were disqualified.)

2014
8th Overall Tour de l'Ain
10th Tour du Finistère
2015
4th Overall Tour du Gévaudan Languedoc-Roussillon
7th Overall Tour de Luxembourg
10th Overall Tour du Haut Var
2016
5th Overall La Méditerranéenne
10th Overall Rhône-Alpes Isère Tour
2017
5th Overall Rhône-Alpes Isère Tour
