= Julien Antomarchi =

French cyclist (born 1984)

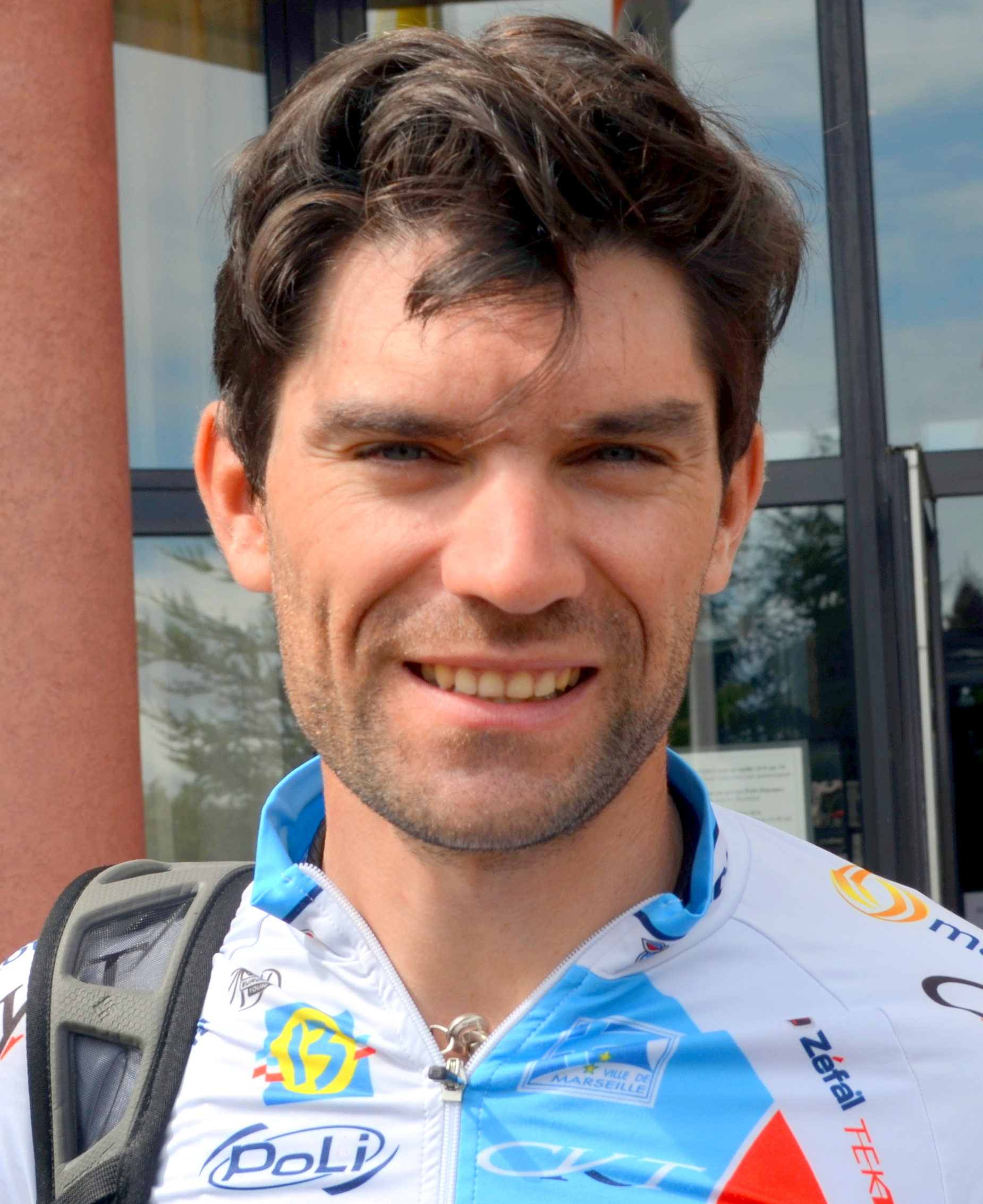
- Antomarchi at the 2014 Tour de l'Ain

Personal information
- Full name: Julien Antomarchi
- Born: 16 May 1984 (age 42) Marseille, France

Cycling career
- Sport: Cycling
- Current team: Retired
- Discipline: Road
- Role: Rider

Amateur team
- 2001–2010: Vélo-Club La Pomme Marseille

Professional teams
- 2009: Skil–Shimano (stagiaire)
- 2011: La Pomme Marseille
- 2012: Team Type 1–Sanofi
- 2013–2014: La Pomme Marseille
- 2015–2021: Roubaix–Lille Métropole

Major wins
- Tour of Hainan (2014)

Julien Antomarchi (born 16 May 1984) is a French former professional cyclist, who rode professionally between 2011 and 2021 for Team Type 1–Sanofi, Team La Pomme Marseille 13 and Xelliss–Roubaix–Lille Métropole.

== Major results ==
2006
1st Gara Ciclistica Millionaria
4th Overall Tour de la Somme

1st Stage 1

2008
1st Stage 2 Les 3 Jours de Vaucluse
3rd Overall Tour de Bretagne

1st Stage 4

2009
1st Stage 3 Tour Alsace
2010
1st Stage 4 Ronde de l'Oise
4th Overall Kreiz Breizh Elites

1st Stage 2

4th Grand Prix des Marbriers
2011
2nd Overall Tour du Haut Var

1st Stage 2

2nd Overall Cinturó de l'Empordà
3rd Paris–Camembert
4th Grand Prix of Aargau Canton
7th Duo Normand (with Thomas Vaubourzeix)
8th Prueba Villafranca de Ordizia
9th Grand Prix d'Ouverture La Marseillaise
2012
10th Overall Étoile de Bessèges
2013
2nd Overall Mzansi Tour

1st Stage 1

4th Paris–Camembert
10th Overall Étoile de Bessèges
2014
1st Overall Tour of Hainan

1st Stages 4 & 7

4th Paris–Troyes
5th Tour of Almaty
2015
1st Mountains classification Four Days of Dunkirk
1st Prologue Tour Alsace
3rd Overall Tour des Pays de Savoie
5th Tour du Finistère
5th Tour du Doubs
2016
6th Grand Prix de Plumelec-Morbihan
10th Overall Étoile de Bessèges
2017
3rd Overall Circuit des Ardennes
4th Tour du Finistère
9th Tour du Doubs
2018
1st Grand Prix de la ville de Nogent-sur-Oise
3rd Overall Tour de Bretagne

1st Stage 4

4th Boucles de l'Aulne
5th Time trial, National Road Championships
7th Overall Tour Poitou-Charentes en Nouvelle-Aquitaine
9th Overall Four Days of Dunkirk
2019
3rd Time trial, National Road Championships
9th Overall Four Days of Dunkirk
9th Overall Boucles de la Mayenne
