= 2007 Vuelta a Burgos =

Race details
- Dates: 14–18 August 2007
- Stages: 5
- Distance: 630 km (391.5 mi)
- Winning time: 14h 31' 37"

Results
	Winner	Mauricio Soler (COL)	(Barloworld)
	Second	Alejandro Valverde (ESP)	(Caisse d'Epargne)
	Third	Carlos Castaño (ESP)	(Karpin–Galicia)

The 2007 Vuelta a Burgos was the 29th edition of the Vuelta a Burgos road cycling stage race, which was held from 14 August to 18 August 2007. The race started in Miranda de Ebro and finished in Burgos. The race was won by Mauricio Soler of the Barloworld team.

== General classification ==
Final general classification

Rank	Rider	Team	Time
1	Mauricio Soler (COL)	Barloworld	14h 31' 37"
2	Alejandro Valverde (ESP)	Caisse d'Epargne	+ 2"
3	Carlos Castaño (ESP)	Karpin–Galicia	+ 30"
4	Daniel Moreno (ESP)	Relax–GAM	+ 47"
5	José Ángel Gómez (ESP)	Saunier Duval–Prodir	s.t.
6	Moisés Dueñas (ESP)	Agritubel	+ 1' 23"
7	David Herrero (ESP)	Karpin–Galicia	+ 1' 52"
8	José Miguel Galindo (ESP)	Relax–GAM	+ 2' 08"
9	Javier Moreno (ESP)	Extremadura–Spiuk	+ 2' 15"
10	Rubén Plaza (ESP)	Caisse d'Epargne	s.t.
