= Florian Guillou =

French cyclist

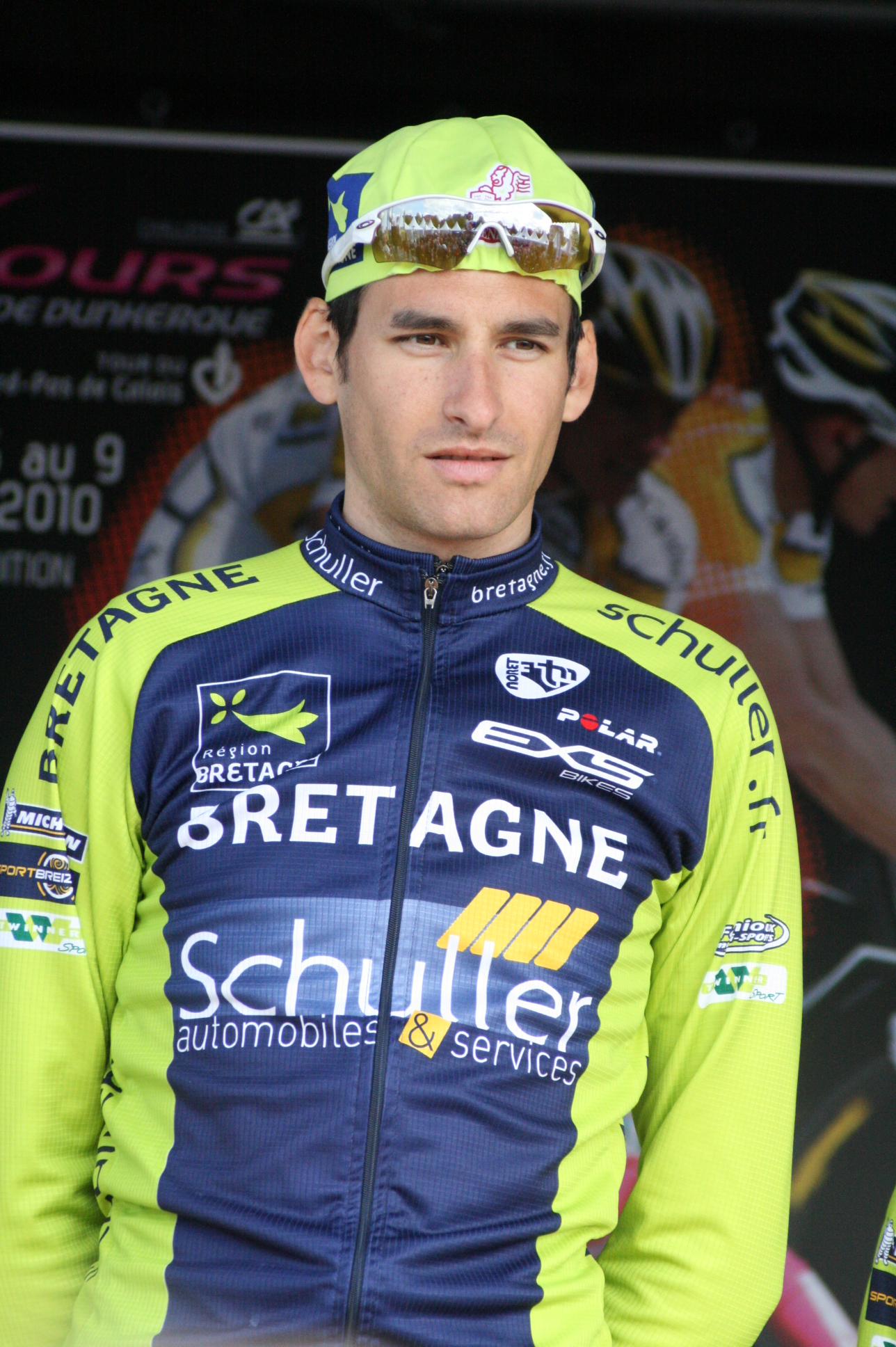
- Guillou in 2010

Personal information
- Born: 29 December 1982 (age 43) Concarneau, France
- Height: 1.95 m (6 ft 5 in)
- Weight: 72 kg (159 lb; 11.3 st)

Cycling career
- Sport: Cycling
- Current team: Retired
- Discipline: Road
- Role: Rider

Professional teams
- 2007: Unibet.com
- 2008–2009: Roubaix–Lille Métropole
- 2010–2015: Bretagne–Schuller

Florian Guillou (born 29 December 1982) is a French former racing cyclist. He rode in the 2014 Tour de France, finishing 62nd – his only Grand Tour start.

== Career ==
Competing professionally from 2006 to 2014, Guillou suffered an knee injury at the Tour de Langkawi. Unable to perform at levels prior to his injury, he retired from serious professional cycling. He finished 47th in his last professional race at the Grand Prix Bruno Beghelli. Following his injury, Guillou occupied the position of sports advisor at the BIC 2000 before its dissolution in 2016.

== Major results ==
2006
1st Stage 3b Kreiz Breizh Elites
2007
3rd Flèche Ardennaise
6th Overall Grand Prix Chantal Biya
2008
2nd Grand Prix de la ville de Pérenchies
8th Classic Loire Atlantique
2009
4th Tour du Doubs
4th Grand Prix de la ville de Pérenchies
10th Overall Tour de Picardie
2010
7th Overall Tour du Haut Var
8th Tour du Doubs
10th Overall Tour Méditerranéen
2011
3rd Overall Tour du Limousin
6th Val d'Ille Classic
2012
6th Overall Tour of Turkey
9th Boucles de l'Aulne
10th Overall Tour du Gévaudan Languedoc-Roussillon
2013
6th Tour du Doubs
7th Overall Tour of Turkey
2014
1st Mountains classification Tour du Haut Var
