= Maxime Méderel =

French road bicycle racer

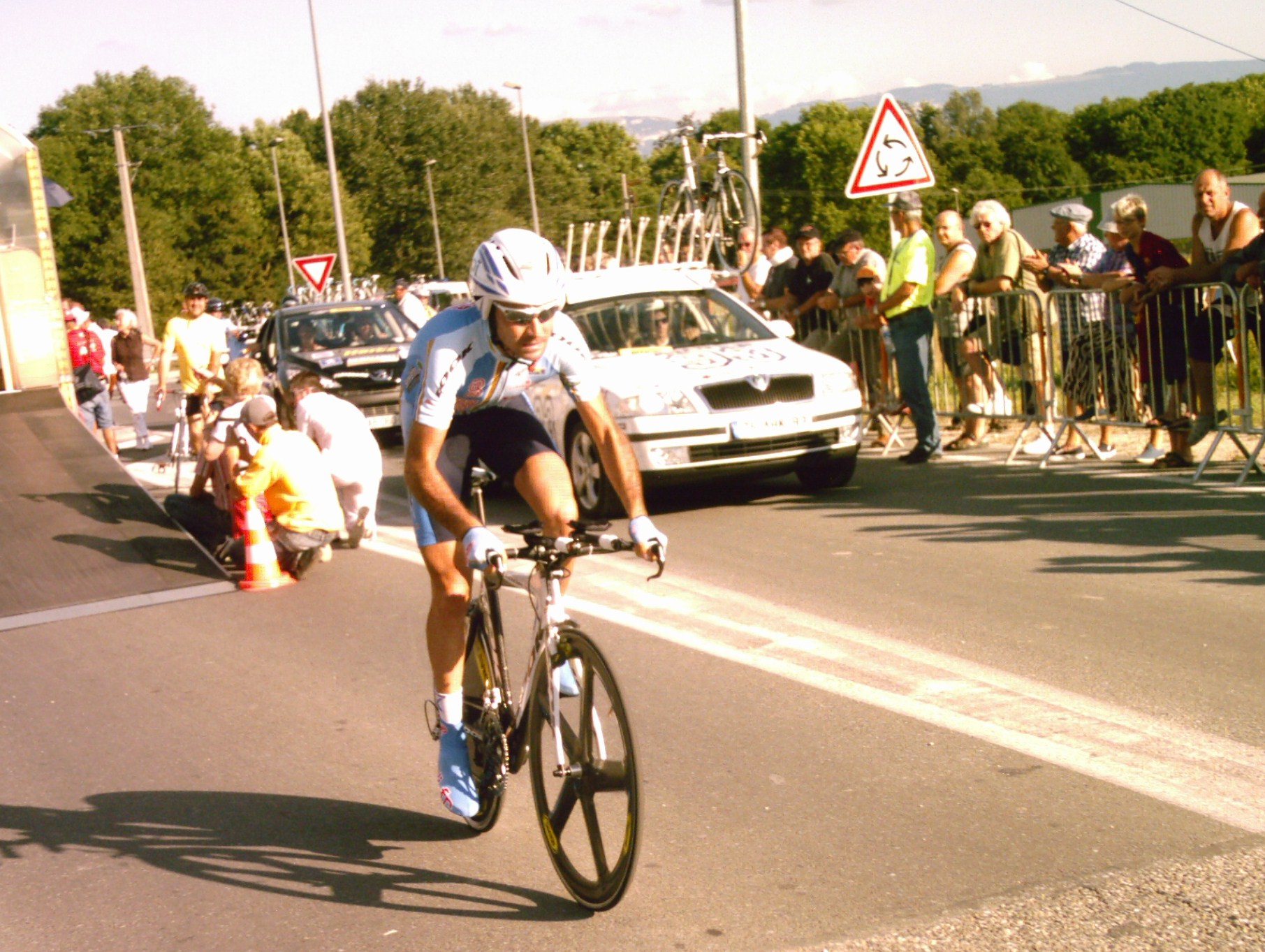
- Méderel at the 2009 Tour de l'Ain

Personal information
- Full name: Maxime Méderel
- Born: 19 September 1980 (age 46) Limoges, France
- Height: 1.73 m (5 ft 8 in)
- Weight: 58 kg (128 lb; 9.1 st)

Cycling career
- Sport: Cycling
- Current team: Pôle Espoirs de Guéret
- Disciplines: Road; Cyclo-cross
- Role: Rider (retired); Team manager
- Rider type: Climber (road)

Amateur teams
- 2002–2003: Panorimo 23 La Creuse En Limousin
- 2004: UC Châteauroux-Fenioux
- 2005–2007: Auber 93
- 2016–2017: UV Limousine

Professional teams
- 2008: Crédit Agricole
- 2009–2011: Auber 93
- 2012–2013: Saur–Sojasun
- 2014–2015: Team Europcar

Managerial team
- 2017–: Pôle Espoirs de Guéret

Maxime Méderel (born 19 September 1980 in Limoges) is a French former road bicycle racer, who competed professionally between 2008 and 2015 for the Crédit Agricole, BigMat–Auber 93, Sojasun and Team Europcar squads. As well as this, he competed for the amateur teams Panorimo 23 La Creuse En Limousin, UC Châteauroux-Fenioux and UV Limousine. He is presently the team manager of the Pôle Espoirs de Guéret.

Méderel joined Team Europcar for the 2014 season, after his previous team – Sojasun – folded at the end of the 2013 season.

== Major results ==
2005
1st Overall Tour de la Manche
1st Paris–Mantes-en-Yvelines
6th Trophée des Grimpeurs
2006
1st Polymultipliée Lyonnaise
1st Stage 7 Tour de Normandie
4th Grand Prix de Plumelec-Morbihan
5th Trophée des Grimpeurs
8th Overall Étoile de Bessèges
8th Tour du Doubs
2007
1st Limoges Cyclo-cross
2nd Paris–Mantes-en-Yvelines
2nd Trophée des Grimpeurs
2008
4th Overall Paris–Corrèze
2009
2nd Overall Circuit de Lorraine
7th Overall Paris–Corrèze
8th Boucles de l'Aulne
10th Route Adélie
2010
2nd Paris–Camembert
5th Paris–Mantes-en-Yvelines
6th Grand Prix de Plumelec-Morbihan
2011
1st Stage 5 Tour de Bretagne
4th Overall Tour Alsace
4th Overall Tour de l'Ain
4th Paris–Camembert
7th Tour du Finistère
8th Overall Route du Sud
2012
8th Overall Tour du Gévaudan Languedoc-Roussillon
9th Klasika Primavera
2013
3rd Overall Tour of Turkey
10th Overall Rhône-Alpes Isère Tour
