= Andrea Palini =

Italian cyclist

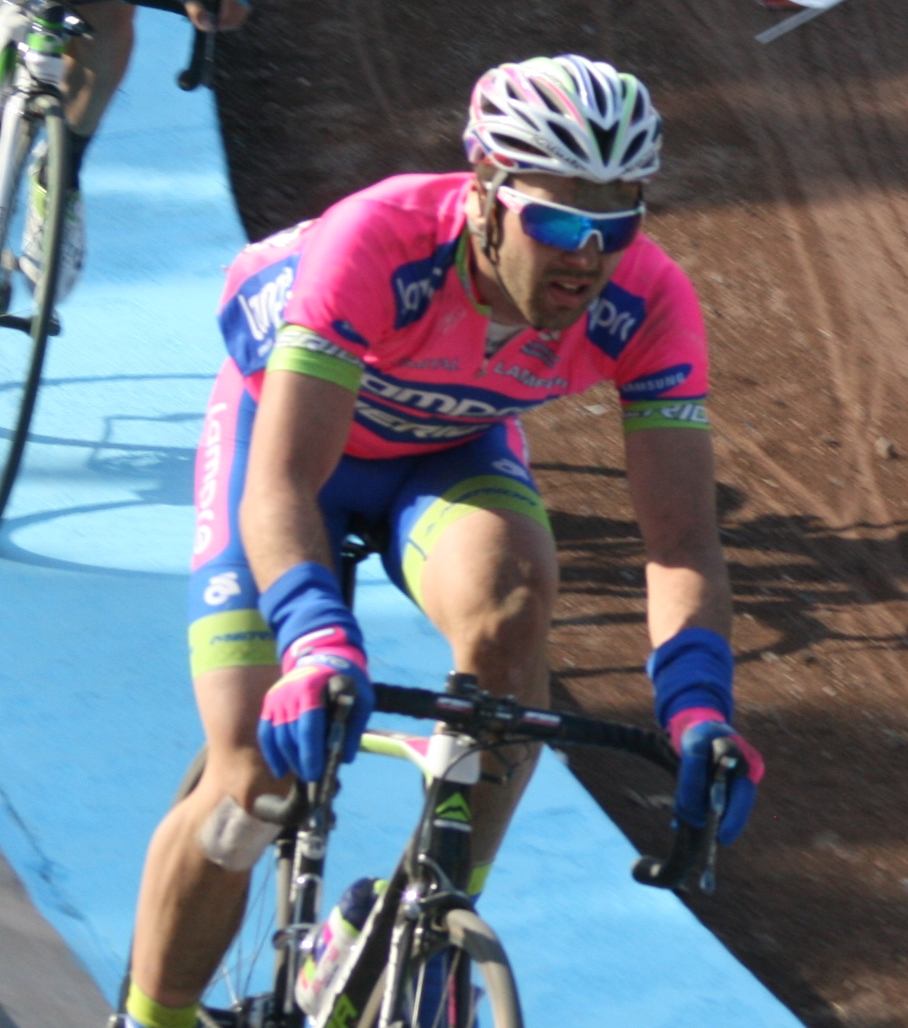
- Palini in 2013.

Personal information
- Full name: Andrea Palini
- Born: 16 June 1989 (age 37) Gardone Val Trompia, Italy

Cycling career
- Sport: Cycling
- Current team: Retired
- Discipline: Road
- Role: Rider

Amateur team
- 2008–2011: ASD G.S. Gavardo–Tecmor

Professional teams
- 2012: Team Idea
- 2013–2014: Lampre–Merida
- 2015–2016: Skydive Dubai–Al Ahli
- 2017: Androni Giocattoli–Sidermec

Andrea Palini (born 16 June 1989 in Gardone Val Trompia) is an Italian former professional cyclist, who rode professionally between 2012 and 2017 for the Team Idea, Lampre–Merida, Skydive Dubai–Al Ahli and Androni–Sidermec–Bottecchia teams.

== Major results ==
2007
1st Road race, National Junior Road Championships
2008
10th Circuito del Porto
2009
1st Trofeo Città di Brescia
8th Trofeo Franco Balestra
2010
1st Coppa Internazionale Colli Briantei
10th Circuito del Porto
2011
4th Gran Premio della Liberazione
4th Circuito del Porto
2012
1st Stage 1 Settimana Internazionale di Coppi e Bartali
2nd Tre Valli Varesine
2nd Gran Premio Industria e Commercio Artigianato Carnaghese
4th Overall Course de Solidarność et des Champions Olympiques
4th Memorial Marco Pantani
5th Coppa Bernocchi
9th Gran Premio Industria e Commercio di Prato
10th Gran Premio Bruno Beghelli
2013
1st Stage 2 La Tropicale Amissa Bongo
2014
1st Stage 5 Tour of Hainan
2015
Tour of Hainan

1st Stages 1 & 2

1st Stage 4 La Tropicale Amissa Bongo
2nd Overall Tour of Taihu Lake
2nd Overall Sharjah International Cycling Tour

1st Points classification
1st Stage 4

2nd Overall Jelajah Malaysia

1st Points classification
1st Stages 2 (TTT) & 4

3rd Overall Tour d'Egypte

1st Stages 2 & 4

3rd Vuelta a La Rioja
5th UAE Cup
7th Overall Tour of Al Zubarah

1st Points classification

2016
1st Stage 2 Tour de Langkawi
1st Stage 1 (TTT) Sharjah International Cycling Tour
2nd Overall La Tropicale Amissa Bongo

1st Sprints classification
1st Stages 1 & 2

2nd UAE Cup
2017
1st Prologue Sibiu Cycling Tour
5th Trofeo Matteotti
