= Moisés Dueñas =

Spanish road racing cyclist

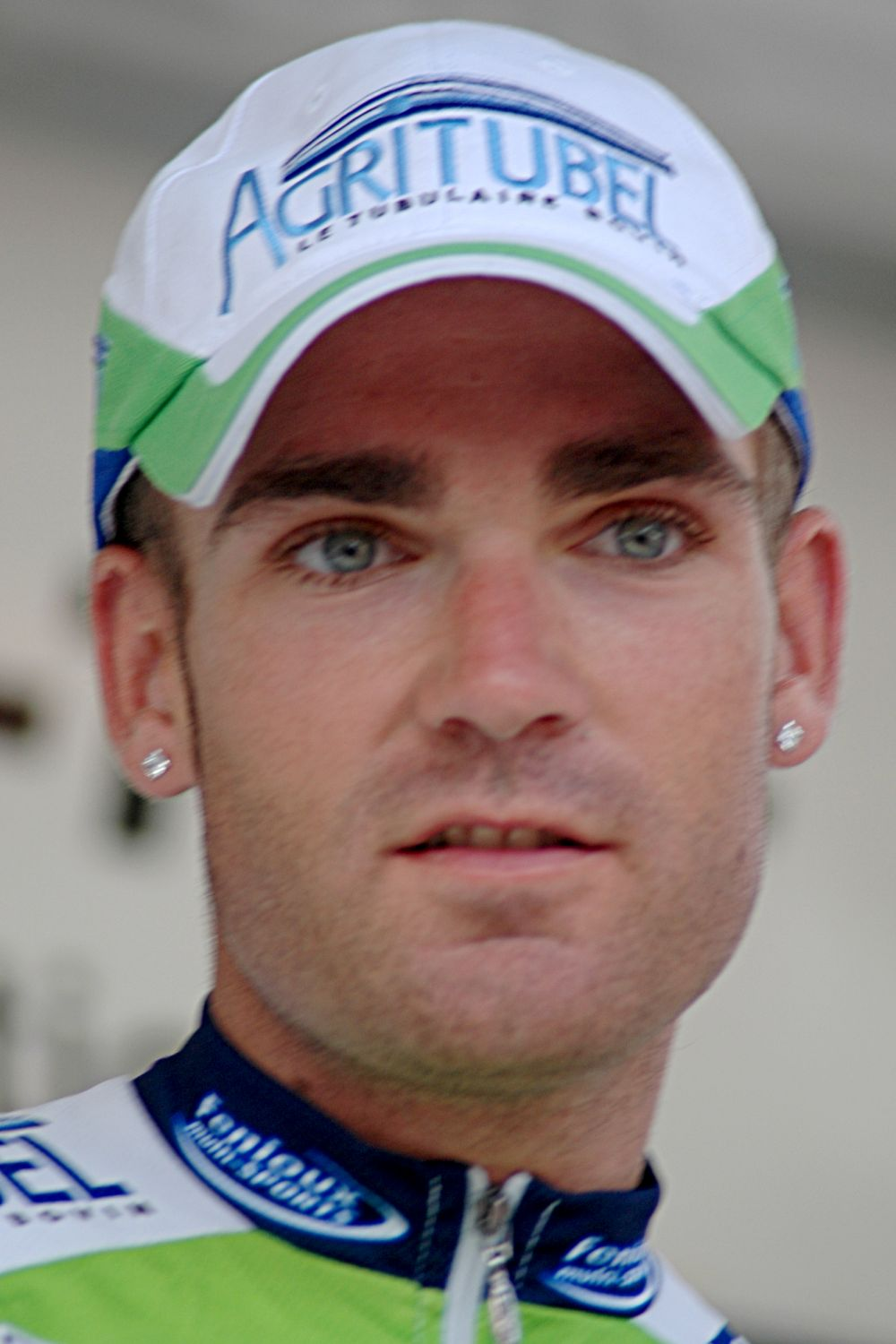
- Dueñas in 2007

Personal information
- Full name: Moisés Dueñas Nevado
- Born: 10 May 1981 (age 45) Béjar, Spain
- Height: 1.74 m (5 ft 9 in)
- Weight: 64 kg (141 lb)

Cycling career
- Sport: Cycling
- Discipline: Road
- Role: Rider

Amateur team
- 2010–2011: Supermercados Froiz

Professional teams
- 2002–2005: Colchon Relax–Fuenlabrada
- 2006–2007: Agritubel
- 2008: Barloworld
- 2012–2015: Burgos BH–Castilla y Leon
- 2015: Louletano–Ray Just Energy

Major wins
- Tour de l'Avenir (2006), 1 stage

Moisés Dueñas Nevado (born 10 May 1981 in Béjar) is a Spanish former road racing cyclist, who competed professionally between 2002 and 2009, and then again from 2012 to 2015.

On 16 July 2008, just before the 11th stage of the Tour de France, the French Anti-Doping Agency (the AFLD) reported that he had tested positive for the banned substance Erythropoietin.

Dueñas retired from professional cycling at the end of 2015.

== Major results ==
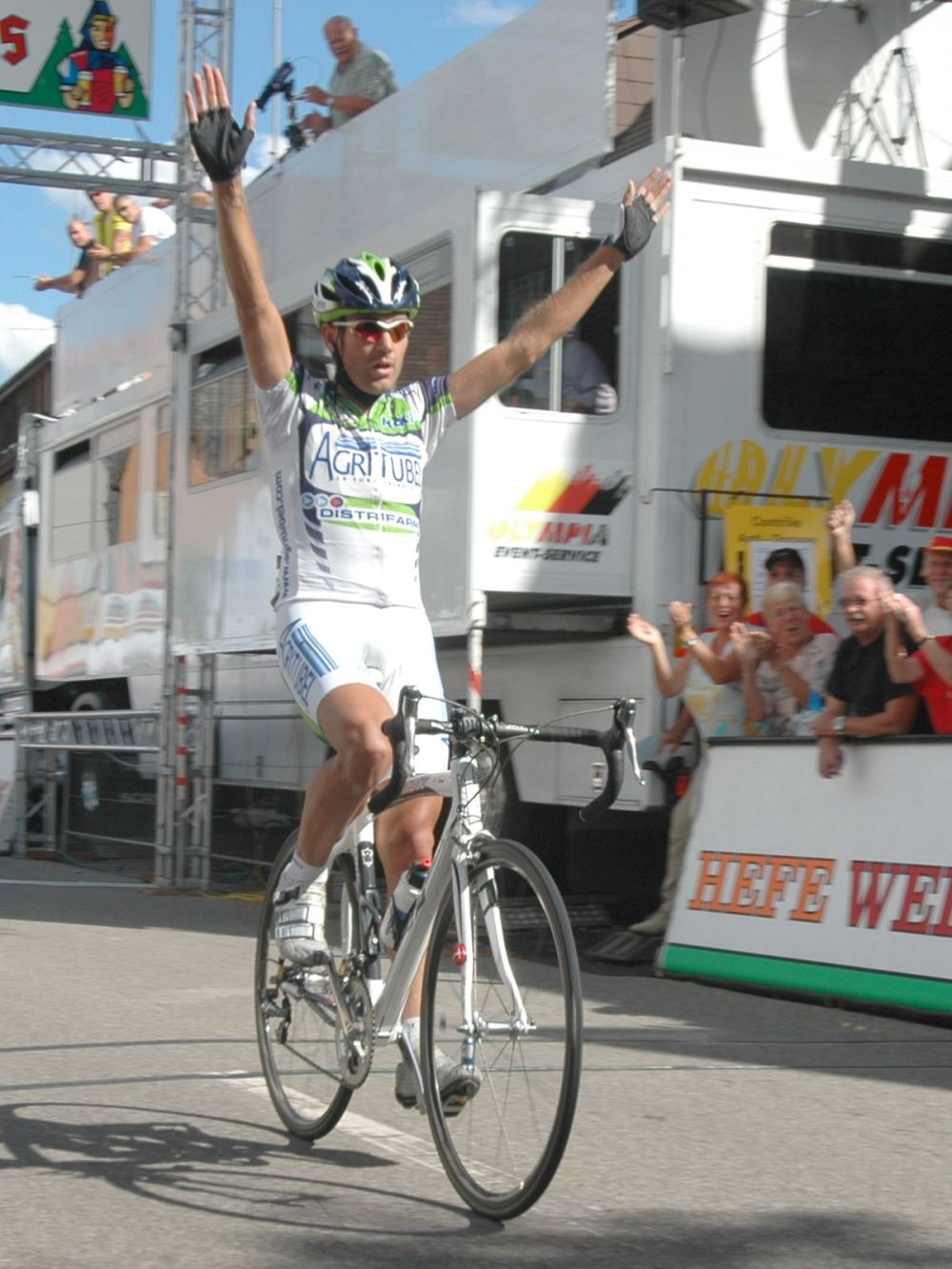
Dueñas winning the second stage of the 2007 Regio-Tour, in Neuenburg am Rhein.

2002
3rd Overall Circuito Montañés

1st Stage 3

2003
5th Road race, UEC European Under-23 Road Championships
2004
4th Overall Tour de l'Avenir
9th Circuito de Getxo
10th Subida a Urkiola
2005
6th Overall Vuelta a Asturias
8th Gran Premio de Llodio
9th Overall Vuelta a Burgos
2006
1st Overall Tour de l'Avenir

1st Stage 6

9th Route Adélie
2007
1st Overall Regio-Tour

1st Stage 2

6th Overall Route du Sud
6th Overall Vuelta a Burgos
2008
7th Overall Vuelta a Castilla y León
2010
2nd Overall Cinturó de l'Empordà

1st Stage 1

5th Overall Vuelta Ciclista a León
2011
7th Overall Vuelta Ciclista a León
2012
3rd Overall Vuelta Ciclista a León

1st Stage 4

6th Overall Tour du Gévaudan Languedoc-Roussillon
9th Prueba Villafranca de Ordizia
2013
3rd Overall Tour des Pays de Savoie
2014
6th Tour du Jura
10th Overall Tour of Hainan
2015
5th Overall Troféu Joaquim Agostinho

== See also ==
- List of doping cases in cycling
