= 2011 Tour du Haut Var =

Race details
- Dates: 19–20 February
- Stages: 2
- Distance: 375.8 km (233.5 mi)
- Winning time: 9h 14' 13"

Results
Jersey awarded to the overall winner	Winner	Thomas Voeckler (FRA)	(Team Europcar)
	Second	Julien Antomarchi (FRA)	(La Pomme Marseille)
	Third	Rinaldo Nocentini (ITA)	(Ag2r–La Mondiale)
Jersey awarded to the points classification winner	Points	Thomas Voeckler (FRA)	(Team Europcar)
Jersey awarded to the mountains classification winner	Mountains	Jérémy Roy (FRA)	(FDJ)
Jersey awarded to the youth classification winner	Youth	Gorka Izagirre (ESP)	(Euskaltel–Euskadi)
	Team	FDJ	

The 2011 Tour du Haut Var was the 43rd edition of the Tour du Haut Var cycling stage race. It was being held 19–20 February 2011 in the French department of the Var, and was rated as a 2.1 event on the UCI Europe Tour.

== Teams and cyclists ==
There were 18 teams in the 2011 Tour du Haut Var. Among them were five UCI ProTeams, nine UCI Professional Continental teams, and four Continental teams. Each team was allowed eight riders on their squad, giving the event a peloton of 142 cyclists at its outset.

The 18 teams in the race were:

UCI ProTeams

- Ag2r–La Mondiale
- Euskaltel–Euskadi
- Garmin–Cervélo
- Movistar Team
- Saxo Bank–SunGard

UCI Professional Continental Teams

- Bretagne–Schuller
- Cofidis
- FDJ
- Saur–Sojasun
- Skil–Shimano
- Team Europcar
- Team NetApp
- Team Type 1–Sanofi Aventis
- Veranda's Willems–Accent

UCI Continental Teams

- BigMat–Auber 93
- Endura Racing
- Roubaix–Lille Métropole
- La Pomme Marseille

== Tour stages ==
=== Stage 1 ===
19 February 2011 – La Croix Valmer to Grimaud, 168.8 km (104.9 mi)

Stage 1 results and General Classification

	Cyclist	Team	Time
1	Samuel Dumoulin (FRA)	Cofidis	4h 00' 05"
2	Rinaldo Nocentini (ITA)	Ag2r–La Mondiale	+ 0"
3	Thomas Voeckler (FRA)	Team Europcar	+ 1"
4	José Joaquín Rojas (ESP)	Movistar Team	+ 1"
5	Cédric Pineau (FRA)	FDJ	+ 1"
6	Gorka Izagirre (ESP)	Euskaltel–Euskadi	+ 1"
7	Steven Tronet (FRA)	Roubaix–Lille Métropole	+ 4"
8	Jeremie Galland (FRA)	Saur–Sojasun	+ 4"
9	Florian Vachon (FRA)	Bretagne–Schuller	+ 4"
10	Jure Kocjan (SLO)	Team Type 1–Sanofi Aventis	+ 4"

=== Stage 2 ===
20 February 2011 – Draguignan to Draguignan, 207 km (128.6 mi)

Stage 2 results

	Cyclist	Team	Time
1	Julien Antomarchi (FRA)	La Pomme Marseille	5h 14' 07"
2	Thomas Voeckler (FRA)	Team Europcar	+ 0"
3	José Joaquín Rojas (ESP)	Movistar Team	+ 29"
4	Julien Simon (FRA)	Saur–Sojasun	+ 29"
5	David Moncoutié (FRA)	Cofidis	+ 29"
6	Rémi Pauriol (FRA)	FDJ	+ 29"
7	Rinaldo Nocentini (ITA)	Ag2r–La Mondiale	+ 29"
8	Chris Anker Sørensen (DEN)	Saxo Bank–SunGard	+ 45"
9	Cédric Pineau (FRA)	FDJ	+ 54"
10	Jure Kocjan (SLO)	Team Type 1–Sanofi Aventis	+ 54"

Final Classification

	Cyclist	Team	Time
1	Thomas Voeckler (FRA)	Team Europcar	9h 14' 13"
2	Julien Antomarchi (FRA)	La Pomme Marseille	+ 8"
3	Rinaldo Nocentini (ITA)	Ag2r–La Mondiale	+ 28"
4	José Joaquín Rojas (ESP)	Movistar Team	+ 29"
5	Rémi Pauriol (FRA)	FDJ	+ 37"
6	David Moncoutié (FRA)	Cofidis	+ 37"
7	Samuel Dumoulin (FRA)	Cofidis	+ 53"
8	Chris Anker Sørensen (DEN)	Saxo Bank–SunGard	+ 53"
9	Cédric Pineau (FRA)	FDJ	+ 54"
10	Gorka Izagirre (ESP)	Euskaltel–Euskadi	+ 54"

== Classification leadership ==
In the 2011 Tour du Haut Var, four different jerseys were awarded. For the general classification, calculated by adding each cyclist's finishing times on each stage. The leader received a yellow jersey. This classification was considered the most important of the Tour du Haut Var, and the winner is considered the winner of the Tour.

Additionally, there was a youth classification, which awarded a white jersey. It is calculated in the same way as the general classification, but is only open to riders born in 1988 or later.

There was also a mountains classification, which awarded a red jersey. In the mountains classification, points were won by reaching the top of a mountain before other cyclists. Each climb was categorized, with the more difficult climbs awarding more points.

The points classification awarded a green jersey. In the points classification, cyclists got points based on the order at the finish line of each stage. The stage win afforded 25 points, second on the stage was worth 20, third 16, fourth 13, fifth 10, sixth 8, seventh 6, eighth 4, ninth 2, and tenth was worth a single point. The points awarded in the sprints classification counted equivalently for this classification. In addition, points were awarded for the intermediate sprints, with 6, 4 and 2 points rewarded to, respectively, the first, second and third-place winners of the intermediate sprints.

The race also awarded a teams classification, which, too, was not represented by a jersey. The teams classification was calculated by adding the times of each team's best three riders per stage per day.

Stage	Winner	General Classification	Mountains Classification	Youth Classification	Points Classification	Teams Classification
1	Samuel Dumoulin	Samuel Dumoulin	Benjamin Giraud	Gorka Izagirre	Samuel Dumoulin	Cofidis
2	Thomas Voeckler	Thomas Voeckler	Jérémy Roy	Gorka Izagirre	Thomas Voeckler	FDJ
Final		Thomas Voeckler	Jérémy Roy	Gorka Izagirre	Thomas Voeckler	FDJ
