= Sergiy Grechyn =

Ukrainian bicycle racer

Personal information
- Born: 9 June 1979 (age 47) Kiev, Ukraine

Cycling career
- Sport: Cycling
- Discipline: Road
- Role: Rider

Amateur team
- 2019: TCOP–Mykolayv

Professional teams
- 2003: Miche
- 2008: Dynatek–Latvia
- 2009–2011: Amore & Vita–McDonald's
- 2012–2015: Konya–Torku Şekerspor
- 2015–2017: China Jilun Cycling Team
- 2018: Lviv Cycling Team

Sergiy Grechyn (born 9 June 1979) is a Ukrainian road cyclist, who last rode for Ukrainian amateur team TCOP–Mykolayv.

== Major results ==
2008
3rd Overall Tour of Bulgaria
6th Grand Prix of Moscow
10th Memorial Oleg Dyachenko
2009
1st Stage 1 (TTT) Univest Grand Prix
8th Grand Prix of Donetsk
2010
3rd Tour of Taihu Lake
2011
3rd Overall Tour de Ribas

1st Stage 1

2012
5th Road race, National Road Championships
2013
1st Overall Tour d'Azerbaïdjan

1st Stage 2

1st Mountains classification Tour of Turkey
1st Mountains classification Baltic Chain Tour
1st Stage 2 Tour d'Algérie
3rd Race Horizon Park II
4th Road race, National Road Championships
5th Race Horizon Park I
8th Grand Prix of Donetsk
2014
1st Mountains classification Tour of Hainan
2015
Les Challenges de la Marche Verte

5th GP Sakia El Hamra
7th GP Al Massira
8th GP Oued Eddahab

6th Overall International Tour of Torku Mevlana
8th Overall Tour of Mersin
10th Odessa Grand Prix 2
2017
4th Tour de Ribas
Race Horizon Park

5th Race for Peace
7th Classic
7th Maidan

8th Odessa Grand Prix
