= Thomas Silva =

Thomas Silva from the National Institute of Standards and Technology (NIST), Boulder, CO was named Fellow of the Institute of Electrical and Electronics Engineers (IEEE) in 2016 for contributions to the understanding and applications of magnetization dynamics.
