= Tour of Hainan =

Chinese multi-day road cycling race

Race details
- Date: April
- Region: Hainan Province, China
- Local name: 环海南岛国际公路自行车赛 (in Chinese)
- Discipline: Road
- Competition: UCI ProSeries
- Type: Stage race
- Web site: www.tourofhainan.com

History
- First edition: 2006
- Editions: 17 (as of 2026)
- First winner: Sergey Kolesnikov (RUS)
- Most wins: Valentin Iglinsky (KAZ) (2 wins)
- Most recent: Thomas Silva (URU)

The Tour of Hainan is an annual professional road bicycle racing stage race held in Hainan Province, China. The race consists of nine stages and has been part of the UCI ProSeries since 2023, previously having been on the UCI Asia Tour. The event was first held in 2006. It was made a UCI 2.1 race from 2007 and upgraded to category 2.HC in 2009. The race was due to be part of the new UCI ProSeries in 2020, but the race was cancelled due to the COVID-19 pandemic.

== Past winners ==
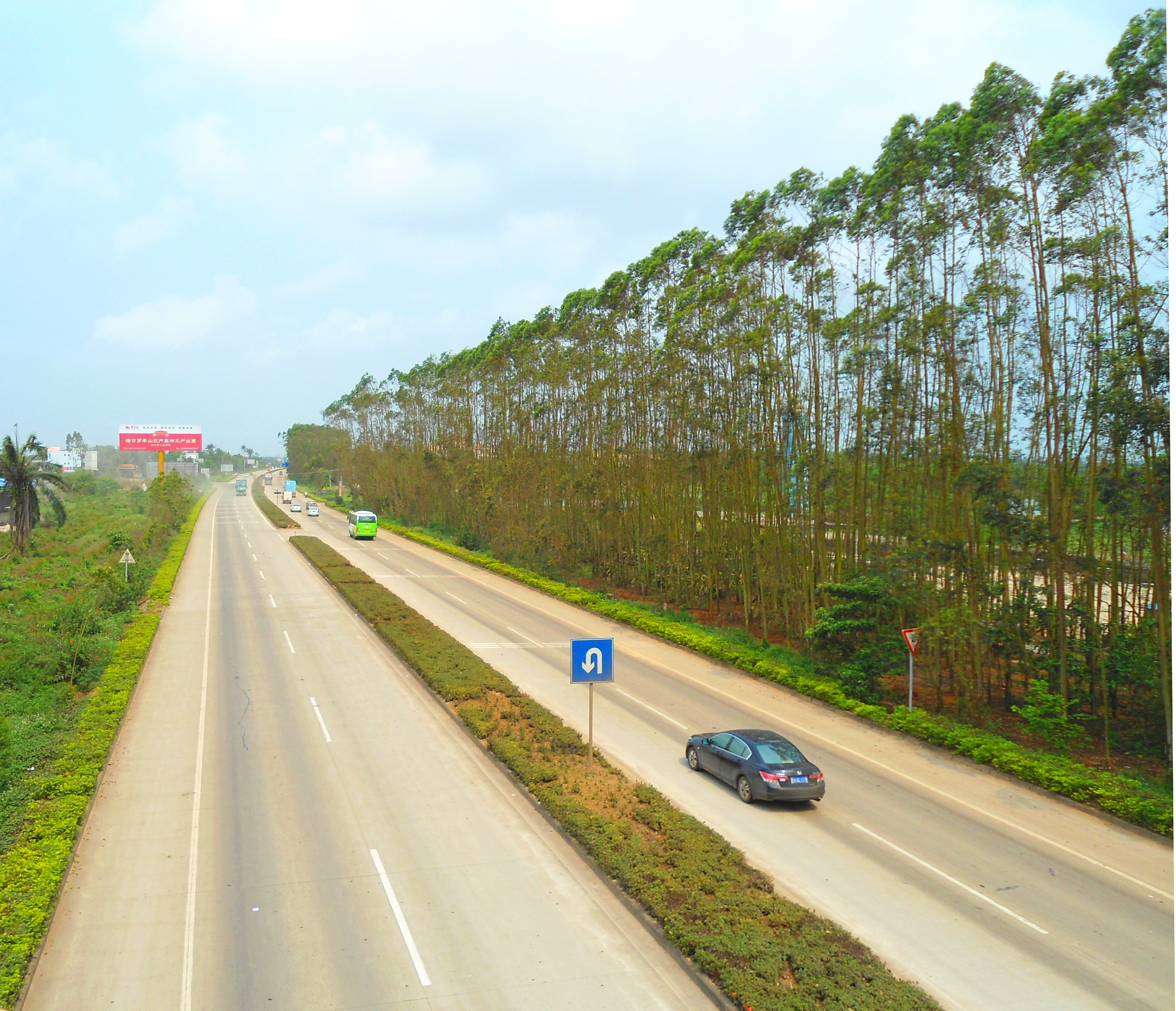
Roads in Hainan

Year	Country	Rider	Team
2006	Russia	Sergey Kolesnikov	Omnibike Dynamo Moscow
2007	Poland	Robert Radosz	Intel–Action
2008	Russia	Boris Shpilevsky	Preti Mangimi
2009	Spain	Francisco Ventoso	Carmiooro A Style
2010	Kazakhstan	Valentin Iglinsky	Astana
2011	Kazakhstan	Valentin Iglinsky	Astana
2012	Kazakhstan	Dmitriy Gruzdev	Astana
2013	Netherlands	Moreno Hofland	Belkin Pro Cycling
2014	France	Julien Antomarchi	Team La Pomme Marseille 13
2015	Italy	Sacha Modolo	Lampre–Merida
2016	Kazakhstan	Alexey Lutsenko	Astana
2017	Italy	Jacopo Mosca	Wilier Triestina–Selle Italia
2018	Italy	Fausto Masnada	Androni Giocattoli–Sidermec
2019–2022	No race		
2023	Spain	Óscar Sevilla	Team Medellín–EPM
2024	New Zealand	Aaron Gate	Burgos BH
2025	Ukraine	Kyrylo Tsarenko	Team Solution Tech–Vini Fantini
2026	Uruguay	Thomas Silva	XDS Astana Team

=== Wins per country ===
Wins	Country
4	Kazakhstan
3	Italy
2	Russia; Spain
1	France; Netherlands; New Zealand; Poland; Ukraine; Uruguay
