= Matteo Fedi =

Italian road cyclist

Personal information
- Born: 11 November 1988 (age 37) Pistoia, Italy

Cycling career
- Sport: Cycling
- Current team: Retired
- Discipline: Road
- Role: Rider

Amateur teams
- 2007: Pedale Larigiano
- 2008: Cargo Compass Albatros
- 2009: Bedogni Grassi Natalini Gruppo Praga
- 2010: Hopplà Magis Mavo Infissi
- 2010: Colnago–CSF Inox (stagiaire)

Professional teams
- 2011–2012: De Rosa–Ceramica Flaminia
- 2013: Ceramica Flaminia–Fondriest

Matteo Fedi (born 11 November 1988 in Pistoia) is an Italian former road cyclist. His brother Andrea also competed as a professional cyclist.

== Major results ==
2006
1st Trofeo Città di Ivrea
8th Overall Giro della Toscana Juniors
2008
4th GP Industrie del Marmo
6th GP Città di Felino
2013
8th Overall Troféu Joaquim Agostinho
