= Filippo Baggio =

Italian cyclist

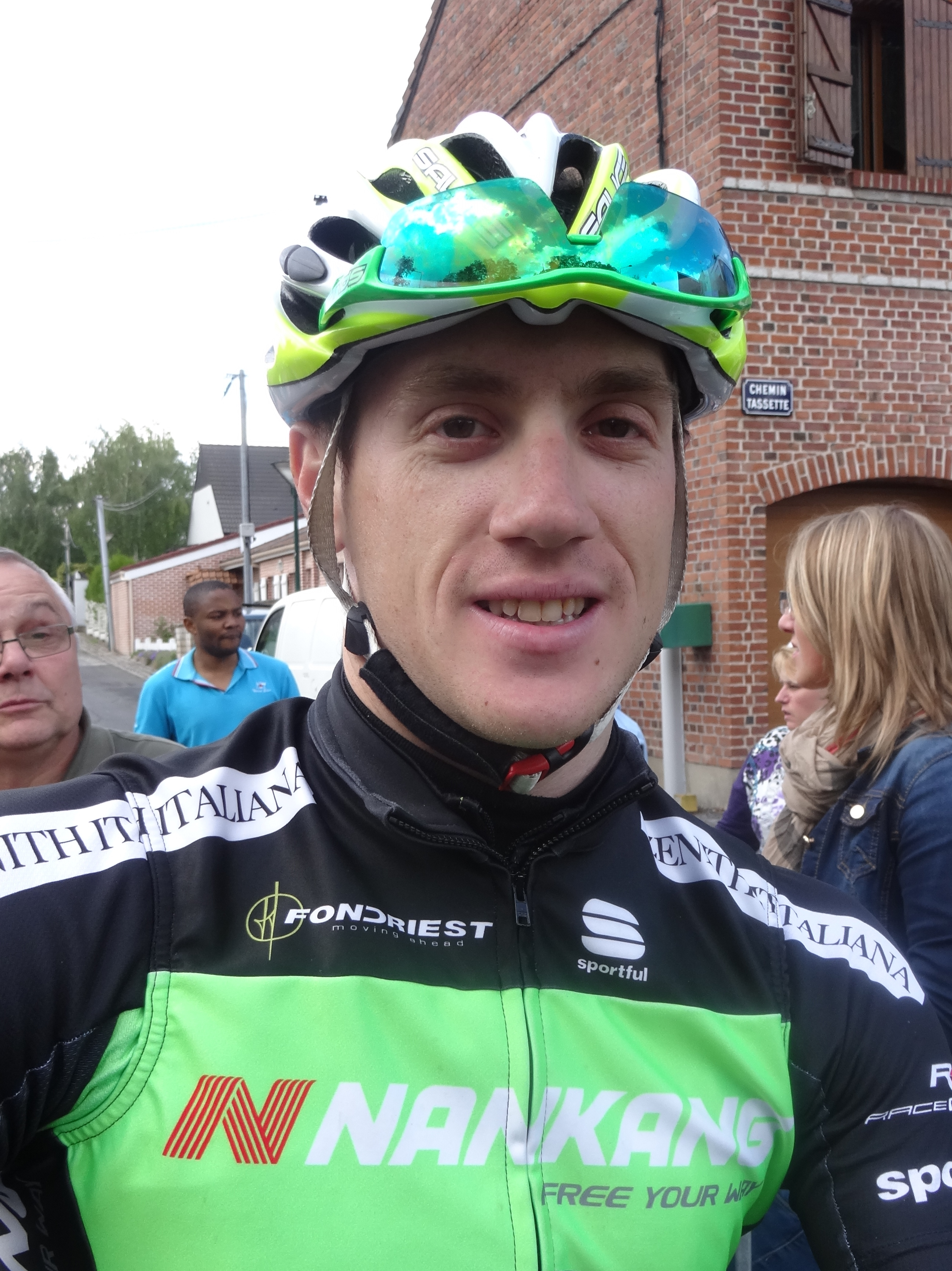

Personal information
- Born: 5 June 1988 (age 38) Cittadella, Italy

Cycling career
- Sport: Cycling
- Discipline: Road
- Role: Rider

Professional teams
- 2010–2011: Ceramica Flaminia
- 2012: Utensilnord–Named
- 2013–2014: Ceramica Flaminia–Fondriest

Filippo Baggio (born 5 June 1988 in Cittadella) is an Italian cyclist.

== Palmares ==
2009
1st Circuito del Porto
2012
3rd Gran Premio della Costa Etruschi
2013
3rd Coppa Bernocchi
