= Andrea Di Corrado =

Italian cyclist

Personal information
- Born: 13 August 1988 (age 38) Ponte San Pietro, Italy

Cycling career
- Sport: Cycling
- Discipline: Road
- Role: Rider

Amateur teams
- 2007: Pagnoncelli-NGC-Perrell
- 2008-2010: Bergamasca 1902 Colpack De Nardi
- 2011: Colpack
- 2011: UnitedHealthcare (stagiaire)
- 2014: Colpack

Professional team
- 2012-2013: Bardiani-CSF

Andrea Di Corrado (born 13 August 1988, in Ponte San Pietro) is an Italian cyclist.

== Palmares ==
2012
1st stage 5 Tour of Turkey
2013
3rd Tour du Limousin
