= Yuriy Metlushenko =

Ukrainian racing cyclist

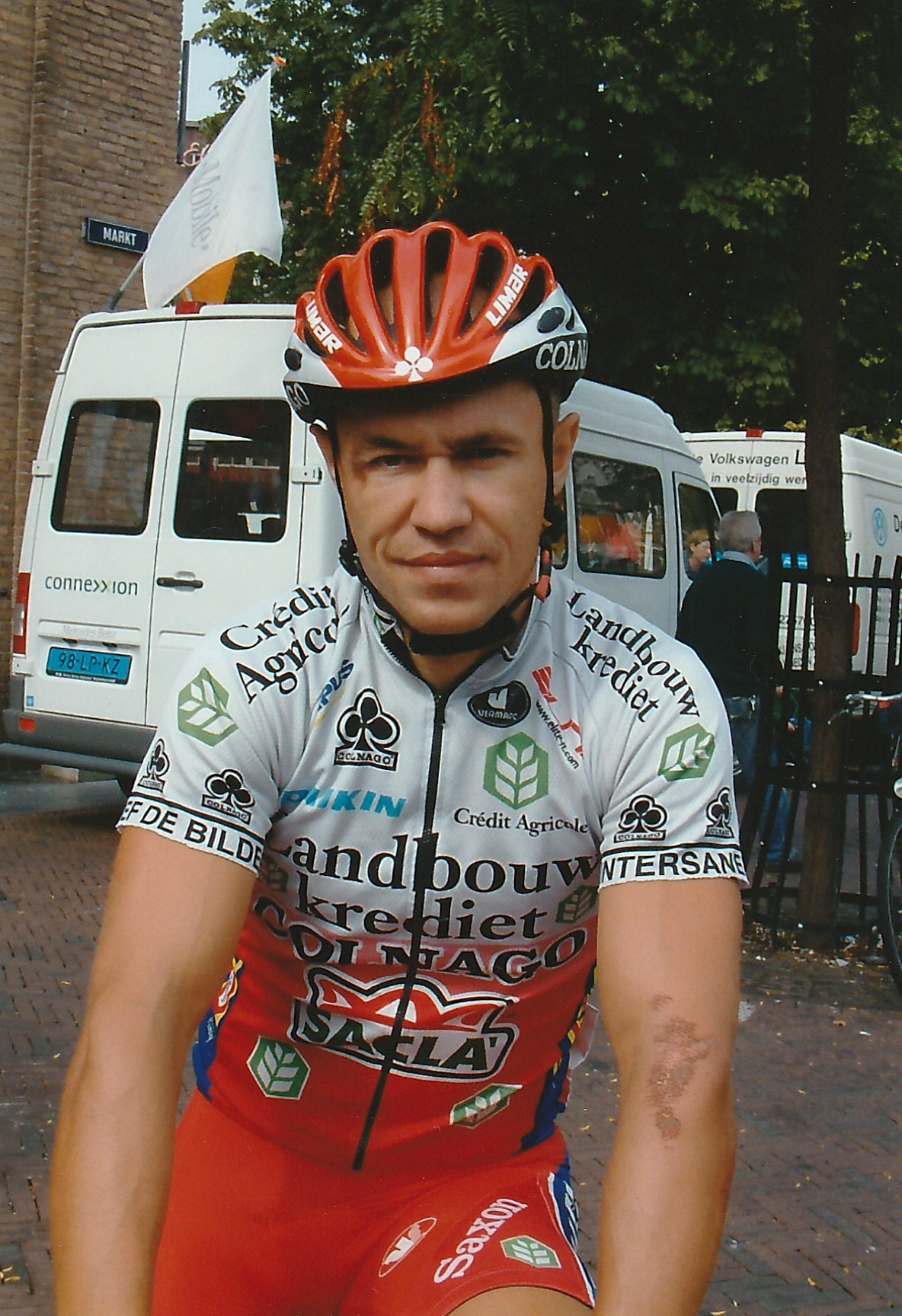

Personal information
- Full name: Yuriy Metlushenko
- Born: January 4, 1976 (age 50) Zhytomyr, Soviet Union

Cycling career
- Sport: Cycling
- Discipline: Road
- Role: Rider

Professional teams
- 2002–2004: Landbouwkrediet–Colnago
- 2006: Miche
- 2006: Team LPR
- 2007: MapaMap-BantProfi
- 2008–2011: Amore & Vita–McDonald's
- 2012–2014: Konya–Torku Şekerspor
- 2015: RTS–Santic Racing Team
- 2015–2017: China Jilun Cycling Team

Yuriy Metlushenko (born January 4, 1976) is a Ukrainian former professional cyclist. He became a professional in 2002 with team Landbouwkrediet–Colnago.

== Major results ==
2002
1st Gran Premio della Costa Etruschi
2003
1st Beveren-Leie
1st Westrozebeke
1st Stage 2 Tour of Denmark
1st Stage 1 Tour du Poitou-Charentes
2004
1st Gran Premio della Costa Etruschi
1st Leeuwse Pijl
1st Stage 2b Brixia Tour
2008
1st Lancaster Classic
1st Stage 2 Tour de Beauce
2009
1st Stage 4 Settimana Internazionale di Coppi e Bartali
1st Prologue Szlakiem Grodów Piastowskich
1st Stage 6 Tour of Qinghai Lake
1st Stage 1 Univest Grand Prix (TTT)
1st Stage 3 Tour of Hainan
2010
Tour of Qinghai Lake

1st Stages 4 & 5

1st Stage 1 Tour of Hainan
2011
1st Stage 6 Tour of Qinghai Lake
2012
1st Overall Tour of Trakya

1st Stages 1, 2 & 4

1st Stage 4 International Azerbaijan Tour
1st Stage 3 Baltic Chain Tour
1st Stage 4 Tour of Taihu Lake
2013
1st Overall Tour of Taihu Lake

1st Points classification
1st Stages 1, 2, 3, 4 & 9

2nd Tour of Nanjing
3rd Grand Prix of Vinnytsia
2016
5th Tour of Yancheng Coastal Wetlands
