= Valentin Iglinsky =

Kazakh cyclist (born 1984)

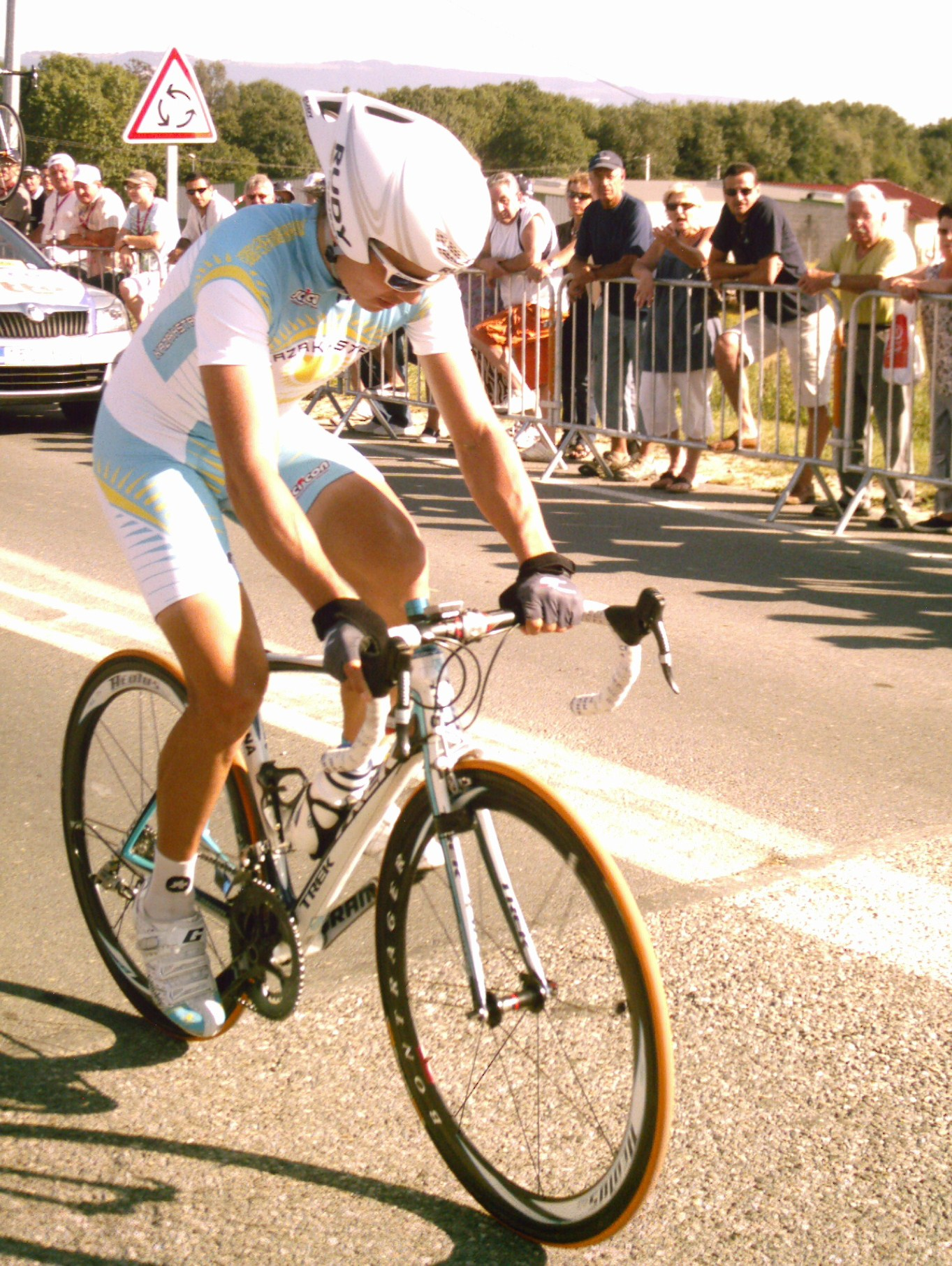
- Iglinsky at the 2009 Tour de l'Ain

Personal information
- Full name: Valentin Iglinsky
- Born: 12 May 1984 (age 42) Tselinograd, Kazakh SSR, Soviet Union (Astana, Kazakhstan)

Cycling career
- Sport: Cycling
- Discipline: Road
- Role: Rider

Professional teams
- 2004–2006: Capec
- 2008: Ulan
- 2009–2012: Astana
- 2013: Ag2r–La Mondiale
- 2014: Astana

Valentin Gennadyevich Iglinsky (Kazakh: Валентин Геннадьевич Иглинский; born 12 May 1984) is a Kazakh road racing cyclist who last rode for UCI ProTour team Astana. He is the younger brother of Maxim Iglinsky, who rode for the XDS Astana Team team.

== Career ==
He had competed for Astana between 2009 and 2012 before joining Ag2r–La Mondiale in 2013.

Iglinsky returned to the Astana team in 2014. On 10 September 2014, it was announced that Iglinsky had tested positive for EPO at the Eneco Tour. He was immediately fired by the Astana management, who said Iglinsky acted independently of the team.

== Career achievements ==
=== Major results ===
2006
1st Stage 6 Tour of Hainan
2007
2nd GP Stad Vilvoorde
2nd Overall Tour of Japan

1st Stages 2 & 4

3rd Road race, National Road Championships
Tour de Bulgaria

1st Stages 1 & 2

2008
1st Stage 2 Tour du Loir-et-Cher
Vuelta a Navarra

1st Stages 3 & 6

2009
1st Overall Tour de Kumano

1st Stages 1, 2 & 3

7th Overall Tour of Serbia

1st Stages 1, 3 & 7

Tour of Qinghai Lake

1st Stages 4 & 5

Tour de Bulgaria

1st Stages 4 & 5

3rd Road race, Asian Road Championships
4th Overall Tour of Japan
2010
1st Overall Tour of Hainan

1st Stage 2

2011
1st Overall Tour of Hainan

1st Stage 8

1st Stage 2 Tour of Turkey
2012
2nd Overall Tour of Hainan
2013
4th Road race, National Road Championships

=== Grand Tour general classification results timeline ===
Grand Tour	2010	2011	2012	2013	2014
Giro d'Italia	DNF	—	—	—	—
Tour de France	—	—	—	—	—
Vuelta a España	153	—	—	—	—

Legend
—	Did not compete
DNF	Did not finish
