= 2016 Tour de Langkawi =

2016 UCI Asia Tour, race 8 of 41
- Logo of the 2016 Tour de Langkawi

Race details
- Dates: 24 February–2 March 2016
- Stages: 8
- Distance: 1,177.9 km (731.9 mi)
- Winning time: 28h 31' 21"

Results
Jersey awarded to the overall winner	Winner	Reinardt Janse van Rensburg (RSA)	(Team Dimension Data)
	Second	Daniel Jaramillo (COL)	(UnitedHealthcare)
	Third	Miguel Ángel López (COL)	(Astana)
Jersey awarded to the points classification winner	Points	Andrea Guardini (ITA)	(Astana)
Jersey awarded to the mountains classification winner	Mountains	Wang Meiyin (CHN)	(Wisdom–Hengxiang Cycling Team)
Jersey awarded to the team classification winner	Team	UnitedHealthcare	

The 2016 Tour de Langkawi was the 21st edition of an annual professional road bicycle racing stage race held in Malaysia since 1996. The race was run at the highest category apart from those races which make up the UCI World Tour, and was rated by the Union Cycliste Internationale (UCI) as a 2.HC (hors category) race as part of the UCI Asia Tour.

== Teams ==
22 teams accepted invitations to participate in the 2016 Tour de Langkawi. Three UCI WorldTeams were invited to the race, along with eight UCI Professional Continental and ten UCI Continental teams. The field was completed by one national selection teams.

UCI WorldTeams

- Team Dimension Data
- Astana
- Tinkoff

UCI Professional Continental teams

- Androni Giocattoli–Sidermec
- UnitedHealthcare
- Southeast–Venezuela
- ONE Pro Cycling
- Bardiani–CSF
- Drapac Professional Cycling
- Funvic Soul Cycles–Carrefour
- Team Roth

UCI Continental teams

- Skydive Dubai–Al Ahli
- Wisdom–Hengxiang Cycling Team
- Aisan Racing Team
- KSPO
- Pegasus Continental Cycling Team
- Terengganu Cycling Team
- Team 7Eleven-Sava RBP
- NSC–Mycron
- Giant–Champion System
- HKSI Pro Team

National teams

- Malaysia

== Stages ==
The race comprises 8 stages, covering 1179 kilometres.

Stage	Date	Course	Distance	Stage result		
Stage	Date	Course	Distance	Winner	Second	Third
Stage 1	24 February	Kangar – Baling	166.6 km (104 mi)	(Italy) Andrea Guardini; Astana	(Australia) Brenton Jones; Drapac Professional Cycling	(Italy) Andrea Palini; Skydive Dubai–Al Ahli
Stage 2	25 February	Sungai Petani – Georgetown	158.1 km (98 mi)	(Italy) Andrea Palini; Skydive Dubai–Al Ahli	(Italy) Andrea Guardini; Astana	(South Africa) Reinardt Janse van Rensburg; Team Dimension Data
Stage 3	26 February	Kulim – Kuala Kangsar	107.2 km (67 mi)	(United States) John Murphy; UnitedHealthcare	(Italy) Francesco Chicchi; Androni Giocattoli–Sidermec	(Italy) Jakub Mareczko; Southeast–Venezuela
Stage 4	27 February	Ipoh – Cameron Highlands	129.4 km (80 mi)	(Colombia) Miguel Angel Lopez Moreno; Astana	(Colombia) Daniel Alexander Jaramillo Diaz; UnitedHealthcare	(South Africa) Reinardt Janse van Rensburg; Team Dimension Data
Stage 5	28 February	Tapah – Kuala Lumpur	148.8 km (92 mi)	(Italy) Andrea Guardini; Astana	(Italy) Andrea Palini; Skydive Dubai–Al Ahli	(South Africa) Reinardt Janse van Rensburg; Team Dimension Data
Stage 6	29 February	Putrajaya – Rembau Town	147.6 km (92 mi)	(Italy) Jakub Mareczko; Southeast–Venezuela	(Slovakia) Juraj Sagan; Tinkoff	(Switzerland) Dylan Page; Team Roth
Stage 7	1 March	Seremban – Parit Sulong	202.3 km (126 mi)	(Italy) Andrea Guardini; Astana	(Italy) Jakub Mareczko; Southeast–Venezuela	(Italy) Andrea Palini; Skydive Dubai–Al Ahli
Stage 8	2 March	Batu Pahat – Malacca City	119.0 km (74 mi)	(Italy) Andrea Guardini; Astana	(Italy) Jakub Mareczko; Southeast–Venezuela	(Japan) Shiki Kuroeda; Aisan Racing Team

== Classification leadership ==
Stage	Winner	General classification	Points classification	Mountains classification	Asian rider classification	Team classification	Asian team classification
1	Andrea Guardini	Andrea Guardini	Andrea Guardini	Wang Meiyin	Wang Meiyin	Bardiani–CSF	KSPO
2	Andrea Palini	Andrea Guardini	Wang Meiyin	Wang Meiyin	Wang Meiyin	ONE Pro Cycling	Team 7Eleven-Sava RBP
3	John Murphy	Andrea Guardini	Andrea Guardini	Wang Meiyin	Wang Meiyin	ONE Pro Cycling	Terengganu Cycling Team
4	Miguel Angel Lopez Moreno	Miguel Angel Lopez Moreno	Andrea Guardini	Wang Meiyin	Adiq Husainie Othman	UnitedHealthcare	Wisdom–Hengxiang Cycling Team
5	Andrea Guardini	Miguel Angel Lopez Moreno	Andrea Guardini	Wang Meiyin	Adiq Husainie Othman	UnitedHealthcare	Wisdom–Hengxiang Cycling Team
6	Jakub Mareczko	Reinardt Janse van Rensburg	Andrea Guardini	Wang Meiyin	Adiq Husainie Othman	UnitedHealthcare	Wisdom–Hengxiang Cycling Team
7	Andrea Guardini	Reinardt Janse van Rensburg	Andrea Guardini	Wang Meiyin	Adiq Husainie Othman	UnitedHealthcare	Wisdom–Hengxiang Cycling Team
8	Andrea Guardini	Reinardt Janse van Rensburg	Andrea Guardini	Wang Meiyin	Adiq Husainie Othman	UnitedHealthcare	Wisdom–Hengxiang Cycling Team
Final		Reinardt Janse van Rensburg	Andrea Guardini	Wang Meiyin	Adiq Husainie Othman	UnitedHealthcare	Wisdom–Hengxiang Cycling Team

== Final standings ==
=== General classification ===
Final general classification (1–10)
	Rider	Team	Time
1	Reinardt Janse van Rensburg (RSA)	Team Dimension Data	28h 31' 21"
2	Daniel Alexander Jaramillo Diaz (COL)	UnitedHealthcare	+ 0' 18"
3	Miguel Angel Lopez Moreno (COL)	Astana	+ 0' 19"
4	Francisco Mancebo (ESP)	Skydive Dubai–Al Ahli	+ 0' 23"
5	Jesper Hansen (DEN)	Tinkoff	s.t
6	George Harper (GBR)	ONE Pro Cycling	s.t
7	Ivan Santaromita (ITA)	Skydive Dubai–Al Ahli	+ 0' 25"
8	Lachlan Norris (AUS)	Drapac Professional Cycling	+ 0' 29"
9	Luca Chirico (ITA)	Bardiani–CSF	s.t
10	Antonio Piedra (ESP)	Funvic Soul Cycles–Carrefour	s.t

Final general classification (11–121)
	Rider	Team	Time
11	Janez Brajkovič (SLO)	UnitedHealthcare	s.t
12	Jonathan Clarke (AUS)	UnitedHealthcare	s.t
13	Julen Amezqueta (ESP)	Southeast–Venezuela	+ 0' 35"
14	John Kronborg Ebsen (DEN)	ONE Pro Cycling	+ 0' 38"
15	Simone Sterbini (ITA)	Bardiani–CSF	s.t
16	Jaco Venter (RSA)	Team Dimension Data	+ 0' 44"
17	James Oram (NZL)	ONE Pro Cycling	s.t
18	Karol Domagalski (POL)	ONE Pro Cycling	+ 1' 03"
19	Tomas Aurelio Gil Martinez (VEN)	Southeast–Venezuela	s.t
20	Valentin Baillifard (SUI)	Team Roth	+ 1' 07"
21	Adiq Husainie Othman (MAS)	Terengganu Cycling Team	+ 1' 10"
22	Masakazu Ito (JPN)	Aisan Racing Team	+ 1' 12"
23	Zhao Jingbiao (CHN)	Wisdom–Hengxiang Cycling Team	+ 1' 13"
24	Roland Thalmann (SUI)	Team Roth	+ 1' 17"
25	Alberto Nardin (ITA)	Androni Giocattoli–Sidermec	+ 1' 21"
26	Marcelo Felipe (PHI)	Team 7Eleven-Sava RBP	+ 1' 36"
27	Samuele Conti (ITA)	Southeast–Venezuela	+ 1' 38"
28	Laurens De Vreese (BEL)	Astana	+ 2' 09"
29	Adrien Niyonshuti (RWA)	Team Dimension Data	+ 2' 24"
30	Johann Van Zyl (RSA)	Team Dimension Data	+ 3' 01"
31	Wang Meiyin (CHN)	Wisdom–Hengxiang Cycling Team	+ 3' 14"
32	Evgeni Petrov (RUS)	Tinkoff	+ 3' 58"
33	Nur Amirul Fakhruddin Mazuki (MAS)	Terengganu Cycling Team	+ 4' 11"
34	Yoshimitsu Hiratsuka (JPN)	Aisan Racing Team	+ 4' 15"
35	Colin Stüssi (SUI)	Team Roth	+ 4' 28"
36	Goh Choon Huat (SIN)	Terengganu Cycling Team	+ 4' 29"
37	Tomohiro Hayakawa (JPN)	Aisan Racing Team	+ 4' 39"
38	Sofian Nabil Omar Mohd Bakri (MAS)	NSC–Mycron	+ 4' 42"
39	Songezo Jim (RSA)	Team Dimension Data	+ 4' 56"
40	Chiu Ho San (HKG)	HKSI Pro Team	+ 5' 08"
41	Richard Handley (GBR)	ONE Pro Cycling	+ 5' 36"
42	Giulio Ciccone (ITA)	Bardiani–CSF	+ 5' 44"
43	Joo Kang-eun (KOR)	KSPO	+ 5' 50"
44	Mark John Lexer Galedo (PHI)	Team 7Eleven-Sava RBP	+ 6' 11"
45	Seo Joo-yong (KOR)	KSPO	+ 6' 31"
46	Tom Scully (NZL)	Drapac Professional Cycling	+ 6' 53"
47	Paolo Simion (ITA)	Bardiani–CSF	+ 6' 54"
48	Mirco Maestri (ITA)	Bardiani–CSF	+ 7' 08"
49	Md Nur Aiman Md Zariff (MAS)	Malaysia	+ 7' 37"
50	Ho Burr (HKG)	HKSI Pro Team	+ 7' 49"
51	Md Zawawi Azman (MAS)	NSC–Mycron	+ 8' 17"
52	Nicolas Dougall (RSA)	Team Dimension Data	+ 9' 22"
53	Agung Sahbana (INA)	Pegasus Continental Cycling Team	+ 11' 28"
54	Liu Jianpeng (CHN)	Wisdom–Hengxiang Cycling Team	+ 11' 36"
55	Amir Mustafa Rusli (MAS)	Malaysia	+ 11' 42"
56	Fung Ka Hoo (HKG)	HKSI Pro Team	+ 12' 18"
57	Jonipher Ravina (PHI)	Team 7Eleven-Sava RBP	+ 12' 28"
58	Edgar Nohales Nieto (ESP)	Team 7Eleven-Sava RBP	+ 12' 33"
59	Gavin Mannion (USA)	Drapac Professional Cycling	+ 12' 45"
60	Juraj Sagan (SVK)	Tinkoff	+ 14' 23"
61	Michael Gogl (AUT)	Tinkoff	+ 15' 03"
62	Jesse James Ewart (AUS)	Team 7Eleven-Sava RBP	+ 15' 20"
63	Erik Baška (SVK)	Tinkoff	+ 15' 22"
64	Michael Kolář (SVK)	Tinkoff	+ 15' 23"
65	Carlos Manarelli (BRA)	Funvic Soul Cycles–Carrefour	+ 15' 30"
66	Zhang Wenlong (CHN)	Giant–Champion System	+ 15' 50"
67	Rastra Patria (INA)	Pegasus Continental Cycling Team	+ 16' 05"
68	Ma Guangtong (CHN)	Wisdom–Hengxiang Cycling Team	+ 16' 07"
69	Brenton Jones (AUS)	Drapac Professional Cycling	+ 16' 25"
70	Mohd Nazri Muhamad (MAS)	NSC–Mycron	+ 17' 07"
71	Mohd Shahrul Mat Amin (MAS)	Terengganu Cycling Team	+ 17' 32"
72	Luca Pacioni (ITA)	Androni Giocattoli–Sidermec	+ 17' 37"
73	Giuseppe Fonzi (ITA)	Southeast–Venezuela	+ 18' 06"
74	Park Sung-baek (KOR)	KSPO	+ 18' 15"
75	Jamalidin Novardianto (INA)	Pegasus Continental Cycling Team	+ 18' 27"
76	Kim Hyeon-seok (KOR)	KSPO	+ 18' 34"
77	Teten Rohendi (INA)	Pegasus Continental Cycling Team	+ 19' 12"
78	Ko Siu Wai (HKG)	HKSI Pro Team	+ 19' 33"
79	Francesco Chicchi (ITA)	Androni Giocattoli–Sidermec	+ 20' 33"
80	Jakub Mareczko (ITA)	Southeast–Venezuela	+ 20' 55"
81	Andrea Palini (ITA)	Skydive Dubai–Al Ahli	+ 20' 57"
82	John Murphy (USA)	UnitedHealthcare	+ 21' 11"
83	Graeme Brown (AUS)	Drapac Professional Cycling	+ 21' 39"
84	Dylan Page (SUI)	Team Roth	+ 21' 41"
85	Gong Hyo-suk (KOR)	KSPO	+ 22' 29"
86	Sun Xiaolong (CHN)	Giant–Champion System	+ 23' 27"
87	Zheng Zhang (CHN)	Wisdom–Hengxiang Cycling Team	+ 23' 45"
88	Afiq Huznie Othman (MAS)	NSC–Mycron	+ 25' 26"
89	Shimpei Fukuda (JPN)	Aisan Racing Team	+ 26' 28"
90	Mohd Harrif Salleh (MAS)	Terengganu Cycling Team	+ 26' 32"
91	Tyler Magner (USA)	UnitedHealthcare	+ 26' 44"
92	Marco Benfatto (ITA)	Androni Giocattoli–Sidermec	+ 26' 47"
93	Vincent Lau Wan Yau (HKG)	HKSI Pro Team	+ 27' 26"
94	Loh Sea Keong (MAS)	Malaysia	+ 27' 53"
95	Anuar Manan (MAS)	Terengganu Cycling Team	+ 28' 09"
96	Andrea Guardini (ITA)	Astana	+ 28' 23"
97	Yan Meng (CHN)	Wisdom–Hengxiang Cycling Team	+ 28' 38"
98	Arman Kamyshev (KAZ)	Astana	+ 29' 54"
99	Ahmad Muazzam Iman Mustafa Kamal (MAS)	NSC–Mycron	+ 31' 31"
100	Irwandie Lakasek (MAS)	NSC–Mycron	+ 32' 41"
101	Meher Hasnaoui (TUN)	Skydive Dubai–Al Ahli	+ 32' 47"
102	Bai Lijun (CHN)	Giant–Champion System	+ 32' 49"
103	Marco Bandiera (ITA)	Androni Giocattoli–Sidermec	+ 33' 06"
104	Mohd Azri Ahmad (MAS)	Malaysia	+ 33' 46"
105	Takeaki Ayabe (JPN)	Aisan Racing Team	+ 33' 49"
106	Tanner Putt (USA)	UnitedHealthcare	+ 35' 41"
107	Matthew Goss (AUS)	ONE Pro Cycling	+ 36' 38"
108	Otávio Bulgarelli (BRA)	Funvic Soul Cycles–Carrefour	+ 36' 47"
109	Nik Mohd Azwan Zulkifle (MAS)	Malaysia	+ 36' 59"
110	Arin Iswana (INA)	Pegasus Continental Cycling Team	+ 39' 10"
111	Jens Mouris (NED)	Drapac Professional Cycling	+ 39' 12"
112	Andrea Dal Col (ITA)	Southeast–Venezuela	+ 39' 49"
113	Francisco Chamorro (ARG)	Funvic Soul Cycles–Carrefour	+ 42' 30"
114	Bi Wenhui (CHN)	Giant–Champion System	+ 44' 16"
115	Shiki Kuroeda (JPN)	Aisan Racing Team	+ 45' 08"
116	Xue Fuwen (CHN)	Giant–Champion System	+ 48' 31"
117	João Gaspar (BRA)	Funvic Soul Cycles–Carrefour	+ 49' 14"
118	Tristan Marguet (SUI)	Team Roth	+ 52' 05"
119	Dias Omirzakov (KAZ)	Astana	+ 53' 35"
120	Choy Hiu Fung (HKG)	HKSI Pro Team	+ 59' 15"
121	Pablo Urtasun (ESP)	Funvic Soul Cycles–Carrefour	+ 1h 09' 52"

=== Points classification ===
Points classification (1–10)
	Rider	Team	Points
1	Andrea Guardini (ITA)	Astana	88
2	Jakub Mareczko (ITA)	Southeast–Venezuela	58
3	Andrea Palini (ITA)	Skydive Dubai–Al Ahli	53
4	John Murphy (USA)	UnitedHealthcare	44
5	Reinardt Janse van Rensburg (RSA)	Team Dimension Data	39
6	Wang Meiyin (CHN)	Wisdom–Hengxiang Cycling Team	31
7	Michael Kolář (SVK)	Tinkoff	29
8	Brenton Jones (USA)	Drapac Professional Cycling	29
9	Shiki Kuroeda (JPN)	Astana	24
10	James Oram (NZL)	ONE Pro Cycling	20

Points classification (11–54)
	Rider	Team	Points
11	Francesco Chicchi (ITA)	Androni Giocattoli–Sidermec	18
12	Paolo Simion (ITA)	Bardiani–CSF	17
13	Dylan Page (SUI)	Team Roth	17
14	Gong Hyo-suk (KOR)	KSPO	16
15	Juraj Sagan (SVK)	Tinkoff	15
16	Mohd Harrif Salleh (MAS)	Terengganu Cycling Team	14
17	João Gaspar (BRA)	Funvic Soul Cycles–Carrefour	13
18	Seo Joon-yong (KOR)	KSPO	11
19	Adiq Husainie Othman (MAS)	Terengganu Cycling Team	11
20	Shimpei Fukuda (JPN)	Aisan Racing Team	10
21	Luca Chirico (ITA)	Bardiani–CSF	9
22	Loh Sea Keong (MAS)	Malaysia	9
23	Karol Domagalski (POL)	ONE Pro Cycling	8
24	Laurens De Vreese (BEL)	Astana	8
25	Sofian Nabil Omar Mohd Bakri (MAS)	NSC–Mycron	8
26	Tanner Putt (USA)	UnitedHealthcare	8
27	Goh Choon Huat (SIN)	Terengganu Cycling Team	7
28	Erik Baška (SVK)	Tinkoff	7
29	Chiu Ho San (HKG)	HKSI Pro Team	6
30	Jamalidin Novardianto (INA)	Pegasus Continental Cycling Team	6
31	Julen Amezqueta (ESP)	Southeast–Venezuela	5
32	Carlos Manarelli (BRA)	Funvic Soul Cycles–Carrefour	5
33	Zheng Zhang (CHN)	Wisdom–Hengxiang Cycling Team	5
34	Ho Burr (HKG)	HKSI Pro Team	5
35	Marco Benfatto (ITA)	Androni Giocattoli–Sidermec	5
36	Meher Hasnaoui (TUN)	Skydive Dubai–Al Ahli	5
37	Jesper Hansen (DEN)	Tinkoff	4
38	Graeme Brown (AUS)	Drapac Professional Cycling	4
39	Matthew Goss (AUS)	ONE Pro Cycling	4
40	Francisco Mancebo (ESP)	Skydive Dubai–Al Ahli	3
41	Adrien Niyonshuti (RWA)	Team Dimension Data	3
42	Mirco Maestri (ITA)	Bardiani–CSF	3
43	Lachlan Norris (AUS)	Drapac Professional Cycling	2
44	Nur Amirul Fakhruddin Mazuki (MAS)	Terengganu Cycling Team	2
45	Michael Gogl (AUT)	Tinkoff	2
46	Luca Pacioni (ITA)	Androni Giocattoli–Sidermec	2
47	Kim Hyeon-seok (KOR)	KSPO	2
48	Dias Omirzakov (KAZ)	Astana	2
49	George Harper (GBR)	ONE Pro Cycling	1
50	Zhao Jingbiao (CHN)	Wisdom–Hengxiang Cycling Team	1
51	Songezo Jim (RSA)	Team Dimension Data	1
52	Tom Scully (AUS)	Drapac Professional Cycling	1
53	Md Nur Aiman Md Zariff (MAS)	Malaysia	1
54	Anuar Manan (MAS)	Terengganu Cycling Team	1

=== Mountains classification ===
Mountains classification (1–10)
	Rider	Team	Points
1	Wang Meiyin (CHN)	Wisdom–Hengxiang Cycling Team	49
2	Miguel Angel Lopez Moreno (COL)	Astana	31
3	Loh Sea Keong (MAS)	Malaysia	28
4	Daniel Alexander Jaramillo Diaz (COL)	UnitedHealthcare	21
5	Reinardt Janse van Rensburg (RSA)	Team Dimension Data	17
6	Gong Hyo-suk (KOR)	KSPO	13
7	George Harper (GBR)	ONE Pro Cycling	12
8	Francisco Mancebo (ESP)	Skydive Dubai–Al Ahli	12
9	Goh Choon Huat (SIN)	Terengganu Cycling Team	12
10	Jonathan Clarke (AUS)	UnitedHealthcare	10

Mountains classification (11–38)
	Rider	Team	Points
11	Ho Burr (HKG)	HKSI Pro Team	10
12	Michael Gogl (AUT)	Tinkoff	8
13	Giulio Ciccone (ITA)	Bardiani–CSF	8
14	Jesper Hansen (DEN)	Tinkoff	7
15	Laurens De Vreese (BEL)	Astana	6
16	Evgeni Petrov (RUS)	Tinkoff	6
17	Songezo Jim (RSA)	Team Dimension Data	6
18	James Oram (NZL)	ONE Pro Cycling	5
19	Tanner Putt (USA)	ONE Pro Cycling	5
20	João Gaspar (BRA)	Funvic Soul Cycles–Carrefour	5
21	Mirco Maestri (RUS)	Bardiani–CSF	5
22	Carlos Manarelli (BRA)	Funvic Soul Cycles–Carrefour	4
23	Luca Chirico (ITA)	Bardiani–CSF	4
24	Janez Brajkovič (SLO)	UnitedHealthcare	3
25	Jaco Venter (RSA)	Team Dimension Data	3
26	Sofian Nabil Omar Mohd Bakri (MAS)	NSC–Mycron	3
27	Meher Hasnaoui (TUN)	Skydive Dubai–Al Ahli	3
28	Lachlan Norris (AUS)	Team Dimension Data	2
29	Julen Amezqueta (ESP)	Southeast–Venezuela	2
30	Karol Domagalski (POL)	ONE Pro Cycling	2
31	Adiq Husainie Othman (MAS)	Terengganu Cycling Team	2
32	Felipe Marcelo (PHI)	Team 7Eleven-Sava RBP	2
33	Antonio Piedra (ESP)	Funvic Soul Cycles–Carrefour	1
34	John Ebsen (DEN)	ONE Pro Cycling	1
35	Nur Amirul Fakhruddin Mazuki (MAS)	Terengganu Cycling Team	1
36	Joo Kang-eun (KOR)	KSPO	1
37	Giuseppe Fonzi (ITA)	Southeast–Venezuela	1
38	Kim Hyeon-seok (KOR)	KSPO	1

=== Asian rider classification ===
Asian rider classification (1–10)
	Rider	Team	Time
1	Adiq Husainie Othman (MAS)	Terengganu Cycling Team	28h 32' 31"
2	Masakazu Ito (JPN)	Aisan Racing Team	+ 0' 02"
3	Zhao Jingbiao (CHN)	Wisdom–Hengxiang Cycling Team	+ 0' 03"
4	Marcelo Felipe (PHI)	Team 7Eleven-Sava RBP	+ 0' 26"
5	Wang Meiyin (CHN)	Wisdom–Hengxiang Cycling Team	+ 2' 04"
6	Nur Amirul Fakhruddin Mazuki (MAS)	Terengganu Cycling Team	+ 3' 01"
7	Yoshimitsu Hiratsuka (JPN)	Aisan Racing Team	+ 3' 05"
8	Goh Choon Huat (SIN)	Terengganu Cycling Team	+ 3' 19"
9	Tomohiro Hayakawa (JPN)	Aisan Racing Team	+ 3' 29"
10	Sofian Nabil Omar Mohd Bakri (MAS)	NSC–Mycron	+ 3' 32"

Asian classification (11–55)
	Rider	Team	Time
11	Chiu Ho San (HKG)	HKSI Pro Team	+ 3' 58"
12	Joo Kang-eun (KOR)	KSPO	+ 4' 40"
13	Mark John Lexer Galedo (PHI)	Team 7Eleven-Sava RBP	+ 5' 01"
14	Seo Joo-yong (KOR)	KSPO	+ 5' 21"
15	Md Nur Aiman Md Zariff (MAS)	Malaysia	+ 6' 27"
16	Ho Burr (HKG)	HKSI Pro Team	+ 6' 39"
17	Md Zawawi Azman (MAS)	NSC–Mycron	+ 7' 07"
18	Agung Sahbana (INA)	Pegasus Continental Cycling Team	+ 10' 18"
19	Liu Jianpeng (CHN)	Wisdom–Hengxiang Cycling Team	+ 10' 26"
20	Amir Mustafa Rusli (MAS)	Malaysia	+ 10' 32"
21	Fung Ka Hoo (HKG)	HKSI Pro Team	+ 11' 08"
22	Jonipher Ravina (PHI)	Team 7Eleven-Sava RBP	+ 11' 18"
23	Zhang Wenlong (CHN)	Giant–Champion System	+ 14' 40"
24	Rastra Patria (INA)	Pegasus Continental Cycling Team	+ 14' 55"
25	Ma Guangtong (CHN)	Wisdom–Hengxiang Cycling Team	+ 14' 57"
26	Mohd Nazri Muhamad (MAS)	NSC–Mycron	+ 15' 57"
27	Mohd Shahrul Mat Amin (MAS)	Terengganu Cycling Team	+ 16' 22"
28	Park Sung-baek (KOR)	KSPO	+ 17' 05"
29	Jamalidin Novardianto (INA)	Pegasus Continental Cycling Team	+ 17' 17"
30	Kim Hyeon-seok (KOR)	KSPO	+ 17' 24"
31	Teten Rohendi (INA)	Pegasus Continental Cycling Team	+ 18' 02"
32	Ko Siu Wai (HKG)	HKSI Pro Team	+ 18' 23"
33	Gong Hyo-suk (KOR)	KSPO	+ 21' 19"
34	Sun Xiaolong (CHN)	Giant–Champion System	+ 22' 17"
35	Zheng Zhang (CHN)	Wisdom–Hengxiang Cycling Team	+ 22' 35"
36	Afiq Huznie Othman (MAS)	NSC–Mycron	+ 24' 16"
37	Shimpei Fukuda (JPN)	Aisan Racing Team	+ 25' 18"
38	Mohd Harrif Salleh (MAS)	Terengganu Cycling Team	+ 25' 22"
39	Vincent Lau Wan Yau (HKG)	HKSI Pro Team	+ 26' 16"
40	Loh Sea Keong (MAS)	Malaysia	+ 26' 43"
41	Anuar Manan (MAS)	Terengganu Cycling Team	+ 26' 59"
42	Yan Meng (CHN)	Wisdom–Hengxiang Cycling Team	+ 27' 28"
43	Arman Kamyshev (KAZ)	Astana	+ 28' 44"
44	Ahmad Muazzam Iman Mustafa Kamal (MAS)	NSC–Mycron	+ 30' 21"
45	Irwandie Lakasek (MAS)	NSC–Mycron	+ 31' 31"
46	Bai Lijun (CHN)	Giant–Champion System	+ 31' 39"
47	Mohd Azri Ahmad (MAS)	Malaysia	+ 32' 36"
48	Takeaki Ayabe (JPN)	Aisan Racing Team	+ 32' 39"
49	Nik Mohd Azwan Zulkifle (MAS)	Malaysia	+ 35' 49"
50	Arin Iswana (INA)	Pegasus Continental Cycling Team	+ 38' 00"
51	Bi Wenhui (CHN)	Giant–Champion System	+ 43' 06"
52	Shiki Kuroeda (JPN)	Aisan Racing Team	+ 43' 58"
53	Xue Fuwen (CHN)	Giant–Champion System	+ 47' 21"
54	Dias Omirzakov (KAZ)	Astana	+ 52' 25"
55	Choy Hiu Fung (HKG)	HKSI Pro Team	+ 58' 05"

=== Team classification ===
Team classification (1–10)
	Team	Time
1	UnitedHealthcare	85h 35' 15"
2	Bardiani–CSF	+0' 04"
3	ONE Pro Cycling	+0' 26"
4	Team Dimension Data	+1' 03"
5	Southeast–Venezuela	+1' 40"
6	Team Roth	+2' 25"
7	Wisdom–Hengxiang Cycling Team	+4' 55"
8	Tinkoff	+6' 10"
9	Terengganu Cycling Team	+7' 43"
10	Aisan Racing Team	+8' 03"

Team classification (11–22)
	Team	Time
11	Team 7Eleven-Sava RBP	+8' 32"
12	Drapac Professional Cycling	+ 11' 52"
13	Skydive Dubai–Al Ahli	+ 14' 20"
14	KSPO	+ 14' 44"
15	HKSI Pro Team	+ 19' 04"
16	Malaysia	+ 19' 15"
17	Astana	+ 20' 38"
18	NSC–Mycron	+ 24' 39"
19	Pegasus Continental Cycling Team	+ 30' 20"
20	Androni Giocattoli–Sidermec	+ 31' 05"
21	Funvic Soul Cycles–Carrefour	+ 36' 10"
22	Giant–Champion System	+ 52' 09"

=== Asian team classification ===
Asian team classification (1–10)
	Team	Time
1	Wisdom–Hengxiang Cycling Team	85h 40' 10"
2	Terengganu Cycling Team	+2' 48"
3	Aisan Racing Team	+3' 08"
4	Team 7Eleven-Sava RBP	+3' 37"
5	KSPO	+ 9' 49"
6	HKSI Pro Team	+ 14' 09"
7	Malaysia	+ 14' 20"
8	NSC–Mycron	+ 19' 44"
9	Pegasus Continental Cycling Team	+ 25' 25"
10	Giant–Champion System	+ 47' 14"

=== Riders who failed to finish ===
11 riders failed to finish the race.
Rider	Team
Ruslan Tleubayev (KAZ)	Astana
Dominic Perez (PHI)	Team 7Eleven-Sava RBP
Tiziano Dall'Antonia (ITA)	Androni Giocattoli–Sidermec
Ali Shambih Ali Thani Mansoor (UAE)	Skydive Dubai–Al Ahli
Hou Yake (CHN)	Giant–Champion System
Nicola Ruffoni (ITA)	Bardiani–CSF
Tariq Obaid (UAE)	Skydive Dubai–Al Ahli
Lukas Jaun (SUI)	Team Roth
Kim Kun-soo (KOR)	KSPO
Muhammad Fauzan Ahmad Lutfi (MAS)	Malaysia
Ryan MacAnally (AUS)	Pegasus Continental Cycling Team

== Stage results ==
=== Stage 1 ===
24 February 2016 — Kangar, Perlis to Baling, Kedah, 166.6 km (103.5 mi)

	Rider	Team	Time
1	(Italy) Andrea Guardini	Astana	04h 15' 57"
2	(Australia) Brenton Jones	Drapac Professional Cycling	s.t.
3	(Italy) Andrea Palini	Skydive Dubai–Al Ahli	s.t.
4	(United States) John Murphy	UnitedHealthcare	s.t.
5	(Switzerland) Dylan Page	Team Roth	s.t.
6	(Slovakia) Michael Kolář	Tinkoff	s.t.
7	(South Africa) Reinardt Janse van Rensburg	Team Dimension Data	s.t.
8	(Japan) Shimpei Fukuda	Aisan Racing Team	s.t.
9	(Italy) Marco Benfatto	Androni Giocattoli–Sidermec	s.t.
10	(Malaysia) Mohd Harrif Saleh	Terengganu Cycling Team	s.t.

=== Stage 2 ===
25 February 2016 — Sungai Petani, Kedah to Georgetown, Penang, 158.1 km (98.2 mi)

	Rider	Team	Time
1	(Italy) Andrea Palini	Skydive Dubai–Al Ahli	03h 56' 02"
2	(Italy) Andrea Guardini	Astana	s.t.
3	(South Africa) Reinardt Janse van Rensburg	Team Dimension Data	s.t.
4	(Slovakia) Michael Kolář	Tinkoff	s.t.
5	(United States) John Murphy	UnitedHealthcare	s.t.
6	(Italy) Jakub Mareczko	Southeast–Venezuela	s.t.
7	(Australia) Graeme Brown	Drapac Professional Cycling	s.t.
8	(Poland) Karol Domagalski	ONE Pro Cycling	s.t.
9	(Italy) Luca Pacioni	Androni Giocattoli–Sidermec	s.t.
10	(United Kingdom) George Harper	ONE Pro Cycling	s.t.

=== Stage 3 ===
26 February 2016 — Kulim, Kedah to Kuala Kangsar, Perak, 107.2 km (66.6 mi)

	Rider	Team	Time
1	(United States) John Murphy	UnitedHealthcare	02h 30' 31"
2	(Italy) Francesco Chicchi	Androni Giocattoli–Sidermec	s.t.
3	(Italy) Jakub Mareczko	Southeast–Venezuela	s.t.
4	(Slovakia) Michael Kolář	Tinkoff	s.t.
5	(Italy) Andrea Guardini	Astana	s.t.
6	(Japan) Shiki Kuroeda	Aisan Racing Team	s.t.
7	(Japan) Shimpei Fukuda	Aisan Racing Team	s.t.
8	(Australia) Brenton Jones	Drapac Professional Cycling	s.t.
9	(Italy) Paolo Simion	Bardiani–CSF	s.t.
10	(Italy) Andrea Palini	Skydive Dubai–Al Ahli	s.t.

=== Stage 4 ===
27 February 2016 — Ipoh, Perak to Cameron Highlands, Pahang, 129.4 km (80.4 mi)

	Rider	Team	Time
1	(Colombia) Miguel Angel Lopez Moreno	Astana	03h 25' 37"
2	(Colombia) Daniel Alexander Jaramillo Diaz	UnitedHealthcare	+ 30"
3	(South Africa) Reinardt Janse van Rensburg	Team Dimension Data	+ 35"
4	(Spain) Francisco Mancebo	Skydive Dubai–Al Ahli	s.t.
5	(Australia) Jonathan Clarke	UnitedHealthcare	s.t.
6	(Italy) Giulio Ciccone	Bardiani-CSF	s.t.
7	(United Kingdom) George Harper	ONE Pro Cycling	s.t.
8	(Denmark) Jesper Hansen	Tinkoff	s.t.
9	(Italy) Luca Chirico	Bardiani–CSF	s.t.
10	(Slovenia) Janez Brajkovič	UnitedHealthcare	s.t.

=== Stage 5 ===
28 February 2016 — Tapah, Perak to Kuala Lumpur, 148.8 km (92.5 mi)

	Rider	Team	Time
1	(Italy) Andrea Guardini	Astana	03h 18' 50"
2	(Italy) Andrea Palini	Skydive Dubai–Al Ahli	s.t.
3	(South Africa) Reinardt Janse van Rensburg	Team Dimension Data	s.t.
4	(Slovakia) Erik Baška	Tinkoff	s.t.
5	(Australia) Brenton Jones	Drapac Professional Cycling	s.t.
6	(Italy) Jakub Mareczko	Southeast–Venezuela	s.t.
7	(Italy) Paolo Simion	Bardiani–CSF	s.t.
8	(Italy) Francesco Chicchi	Androni Giocattoli–Sidermec	s.t.
9	(Switzerland) Dylan Page	Team Roth	s.t.
10	(Malaysia) Anuar Manan	Terengganu Cycling Team	s.t.

=== Stage 6 ===
29 February 2016 — Putrajaya to Rembau, Negeri Sembilan, 147.6 km (91.7 mi)

	Rider	Team	Time
1	(Italy) Jakub Mareczko	Southeast–Venezuela	03h 34' 01"
2	(Slovakia) Juraj Sagan	Tinkoff	s.t.
3	(Switzerland) Dylan Page	Team Roth	s.t.
4	(United States) John Murphy	UnitedHealthcare	s.t.
5	(Malaysia) Mohd Harrif Saleh	Terengganu Cycling Team	s.t.
6	(Australia) Ryan Macanally	Pegasus Continental Cycling Team	s.t.
7	(Australia) Brenton Jones	Drapac Professional Cycling	s.t.
8	(Italy) Francesco Chicchi	Androni Giocattoli–Sidermec	s.t.
9	(Italy) Paolo Simion	Bardiani-CSF	s.t.
10	(Italy) Andrea Palini	Skydive Dubai–Al Ahli	s.t.

=== Stage 7 ===
1 March 2016 — Seremban, Negeri Sembilan to Parit Sulong, Johor, 202.3 km (125.7 mi)

	Rider	Team	Time
1	(Italy) Andrea Guardini	Astana	04h 47' 12"
2	(Italy) Jakub Mareczko	Southeast–Venezuela	s.t.
3	(Italy) Andrea Palini	Skydive Dubai–Al Ahli	s.t.
4	(Malaysia) Mohd Harrif Saleh	Terengganu Cycling Team	s.t.
5	(South Africa) Reinardt Janse van Rensburg	Team Dimension Data	s.t.
6	(Italy) Paolo Simion	Bardiani–CSF	s.t.
7	(United States) John Murphy	UnitedHealthcare	s.t.
8	(Japan) Shimpei Fukuda	Aisan Racing Team	s.t.
9	(Italy) Marco Benfatto	Androni Giocattoli–Sidermec	s.t.
10	(Slovakia) Michael Kolář	Tinkoff	s.t.

=== Stage 8 ===
2 March 2016 — Batu Pahat, Johor to Melaka, Loop 119.0 km (73.9 mi)

	Rider	Team	Time
1	(Italy) Andrea Guardini	Astana	02h 42' 55"
2	(Italy) Jakub Mareczko	Southeast–Venezuela	s.t.
3	(Japan) Shiki Kuroeda	Aisan Racing Team	s.t.
4	(Slovakia) Michael Kolář	Tinkoff	s.t.
5	(Italy) Andrea Palini	Skydive Dubai–Al Ahli	s.t.
6	(United States) John Murphy	UnitedHealthcare	s.t.
7	(Australia) Brenton Jones	Drapac Professional Cycling	s.t.
8	(Italy) Paolo Simion	Bardiani-CSF	s.t.
9	(Australia) Matthew Goss	ONE Pro Cycling	s.t.
10	(Italy) Marco Benfatto	Androni Giocattoli–Sidermec	s.t.
