= 2015 Tour de Langkawi =

2015 UCI Asia Tour, race 10 of 41
- Logo of the 2015 Tour de Langkawi

Race details
- Dates: 8–15 March 2015
- Stages: 8
- Distance: 1,193.10 km (741.36 mi)
- Winning time: 28h 12' 04"

Results
Jersey awarded to the overall winner	Winner	Youcef Reguigui (ALG)	(MTN–Qhubeka)
	Second	Valerio Agnoli (ITA)	(Astana)
	Third	Sebastián Henao (COL)	(Team Sky)
Jersey awarded to the points classification winner	Points	Caleb Ewan (AUS)	(Orica–GreenEDGE)
Jersey awarded to the mountains classification winner	Mountains	Kiel Reijnen (USA)	(UnitedHealthcare)
	Team	Pegasus Continental Cycling Team	

The 2015 Tour de Langkawi was the 20th edition of the Tour de Langkawi road cycling stage race. It took place in Malaysia between 8 and 15 March 2015, consisting of eight road stages. The race was rated by the UCI as a 2.HC (hors category) race as part of the 2015 UCI Asia Tour.

== Teams ==
22 teams were selected to take part in the race. Four of these were UCI WorldTeams, seven were UCI Professional Continental teams, ten are UCI Continental teams and a Malaysian national team.

WorldTeams

- Astana
- Team Sky
- Orica–GreenEDGE
- Tinkoff–Saxo

Professional Continental teams

- Colombia
- MTN–Qhubeka
- UnitedHealthcare
- Southeast Pro Cycling
- Bretagne–Séché Environnement
- Bardiani–CSF
- Androni Giocattoli

Continental teams

- Skydive Dubai–Al Ahli
- Terengganu Cycling Team
- Aisan Racing Team
- Hengxiang Cycling Team
- Synergy Baku
- Pegasus Continental Cycling Team
- Torku Şekerspor
- KSPO
- Giant–Champion System
- National Sport Council of Malaysia Cycling Team

National teams

- Malaysia

== Route ==
The race was scheduled to include eight stages. The key stage was originally intended to be the seventh stage with a climb to the Genting Highlands, but this was cancelled due to dangerous construction work taking place on the road. A different climb, Fraser's Hill, took its place, since this climb was easier, many teams who had planned their races around the original climb were unhappy.

List of stages
Stage	Date	Course	Distance	Type	Winner
1	8 March	Langkawi (Pantai Chenang) to Langkawi (Pantai Chenang)	99.2 km (62 mi)	Flat stage	Andrea Guardini (ITA)
2	9 March	Alor Setar to Sungai Petani	185.0 km (115 mi)	Flat stage	Andrea Guardini (ITA)
3	10 March	Gerik to Tanah Merah	170.0 km (106 mi)	Flat stage	Caleb Ewan (AUS)
4	11 March	Kota Bharu to Kuala Berang	165.4 km (103 mi)	Flat stage	Andrea Guardini (ITA)
5	12 March	Kuala Terengganu to Kuantan	200.0 km (124 mi)	Flat stage	Seo Joon-yong (KOR)
6	13 March	Maran to Karak	96.6 km (60 mi)	Flat stage	Caleb Ewan (AUS)
7	14 March	Shah Alam to Fraser's Hill	180.8 km (112 mi)	Mountain stage	Youcef Reguigui (ALG)
8	15 March	Kuala Kubu Bharu to Kuala Lumpur	96.1 km (60 mi)	Flat stage	Andrea Guardini (ITA)

== Stages ==
=== Stage 1 ===
8 March 2015 — Langkawi (Pantai Chenang) to Langkawi (Pantai Chenang), 99.2 km (62 mi)

Stage 1 result
Rank	Rider	Team	Time
1	Andrea Guardini (ITA)	Astana	2h 19' 06"
2	Caleb Ewan (AUS)	Orica–GreenEDGE	+ 0"
3	Anuar Manan (MYS)	Terengganu Cycling Team	+ 0"
4	Andrea Dal Col (ITA)	Southeast Pro Cycling	+ 0"
5	Romain Feillu (FRA)	Bretagne–Séché Environnement	+ 0"
6	Ahmet Örken (TUR)	Torku Şekerspor	+ 0"
7	Youcef Reguigui (ALG)	MTN–Qhubeka	+ 0"
8	Nikolay Trusov (RUS)	Tinkoff–Saxo	+ 0"
9	Francesco Chicchi (ITA)	Androni Giocattoli	+ 0"
10	Ken Hanson (USA)	UnitedHealthcare	+ 0"

General classification after Stage 1
Rank	Rider	Team	Time
1	Andrea Guardini (ITA)	Astana	2h 18' 56"
2	Caleb Ewan (AUS)	Orica–GreenEDGE	+ 4"
3	Ma Guangtong (CHN)	Hengxiang Cycling Team	+ 5"
4	Anuar Manan (MYS)	Terengganu Cycling Team	+ 6"
5	Afiq Huznie Othman (MYS)	National Sport Council of Malaysia Cycling Team	+ 7"
6	Kiel Reijnen (USA)	UnitedHealthcare	+ 9"
7	Andrea Dal Col (ITA)	Southeast Pro Cycling	+ 10"
8	Romain Feillu (FRA)	Bretagne–Séché Environnement	+ 10"
9	Ahmet Örken (TUR)	Torku Şekerspor	+ 10"
10	Youcef Reguigui (ALG)	MTN–Qhubeka	+ 10"

=== Stage 2 ===
9 March 2015 — Alor Setar to Sungai Petani, 185.0 km (115 mi)

Stage 2 result
Rank	Rider	Team	Time
1	Andrea Guardini (ITA)	Astana	4h 30' 36"
2	Caleb Ewan (AUS)	Orica–GreenEDGE	+ 0"
3	Jakub Mareczko (ITA)	Southeast Pro Cycling	+ 0"
4	Harrif Saleh (MYS)	Terengganu Cycling Team	+ 0"
5	Ahmet Örken (TUR)	Torku Şekerspor	+ 0"
6	Shinpei Fukuda (JPN)	Aisan Racing Team	+ 0"
7	Nikolay Trusov (RUS)	Tinkoff–Saxo	+ 0"
8	Ken Hanson (USA)	UnitedHealthcare	+ 0"
9	Juan Sebastián Molano (COL)	Colombia	+ 0"
10	Francesco Chicchi (ITA)	Androni Giocattoli	+ 0"

General classification after Stage 2
Rank	Rider	Team	Time
1	Andrea Guardini (ITA)	Astana	6h 49' 22"
2	Caleb Ewan (AUS)	Orica–GreenEDGE	+ 8"
3	Adiq Husainie Othman (MYS)	Terengganu Cycling Team	+ 13"
4	Ma Guangtong (CHN)	Hengxiang Cycling Team	+ 15"
5	Anuar Manan (MYS)	Terengganu Cycling Team	+ 16"
6	Patria Rastra (INA)	Pegasus Continental Cycling Team	+ 16"
7	Wang Meiyin (CHN)	Hengxiang Cycling Team	+ 17"
8	Zhang Wenlong (CHN)	Giant–Champion System	+ 18"
9	Elchin Asadov (AZE)	Synergy Baku	+ 18"
10	Liu Jianpeng (CHN)	Hengxiang Cycling Team	+ 18"

=== Stage 3 ===
10 March 2015 — Gerik to Tanah Merah, 170.0 km (106 mi)

Stage 3 result
Rank	Rider	Team	Time
1	Caleb Ewan (AUS)	Orica–GreenEDGE	4h 13' 32"
2	Youcef Reguigui (ALG)	MTN–Qhubeka	+ 0"
3	Leonardo Duque (COL)	Colombia	+ 0"
4	Romain Feillu (FRA)	Bretagne–Séché Environnement	+ 0"
5	Rafaâ Chtioui (TUN)	Skydive Dubai–Al Ahli	+ 0"
6	Luca Chirico (ITA)	Bardiani–CSF	+ 0"
7	Valerio Agnoli (ITA)	Astana	+ 0"
8	Marco Frapporti (ITA)	Androni Giocattoli	+ 0"
9	Merhawi Kudus (ERI)	MTN–Qhubeka	+ 0"
10	Alessio Taliani (ITA)	Androni Giocattoli	+ 0"

General classification after Stage 3
Rank	Rider	Team	Time
1	Caleb Ewan (AUS)	Orica–GreenEDGE	11h 02' 52"
2	Natnael Berhane (ERI)	MTN–Qhubeka	+ 13"
3	Youcef Reguigui (ALG)	MTN–Qhubeka	+ 16"
4	Francisco Mancebo (ESP)	Skydive Dubai–Al Ahli	+ 16"
5	Leonardo Duque (COL)	Colombia	+ 18"
6	Frédéric Brun (FRA)	Bretagne–Séché Environnement	+ 19"
7	Zhang Wenlong (CHN)	Giant–Champion System	+ 20"
8	Liu Jianpeng (CHN)	Hengxiang Cycling Team	+ 20"
9	Robin Manullang (INA)	Pegasus Continental Cycling Team	+ 21"
10	Romain Feillu (FRA)	Bretagne–Séché Environnement	+ 22"

=== Stage 4 ===
11 March 2015 — Kota Bharu to Kuala Berang, 165.4 km (103 mi)

Stage 4 result
Rank	Rider	Team	Time
1	Andrea Guardini (ITA)	Astana	3h 43' 14"
2	Jakub Mareczko (ITA)	Southeast Pro Cycling	+ 0"
3	Caleb Ewan (AUS)	Orica–GreenEDGE	+ 0"
4	Youcef Reguigui (ALG)	MTN–Qhubeka	+ 0"
5	Ken Hanson (USA)	UnitedHealthcare	+ 0"
6	Harrif Saleh (MYS)	Terengganu Cycling Team	+ 0"
7	Christopher Sutton (AUS)	Team Sky	+ 0"
8	Rafaâ Chtioui (TUN)	Skydive Dubai–Al Ahli	+ 0"
9	Oleksandr Surutkovych (UKR)	Synergy Baku	+ 0"
10	Ryōhei Komori (JPN)	Aisan Racing Team	+ 0"

General classification after Stage 4
Rank	Rider	Team	Time
1	Caleb Ewan (AUS)	Orica–GreenEDGE	14h 46' 02"
2	Natnael Berhane (ERI)	MTN–Qhubeka	+ 17"
3	Youcef Reguigui (ALG)	MTN–Qhubeka	+ 20"
4	Pierre-Luc Périchon (FRA)	Bretagne–Séché Environnement	+ 20"
5	Francisco Mancebo (ESP)	Skydive Dubai–Al Ahli	+ 20"
6	Leonardo Duque (COL)	Colombia	+ 22"
7	Frédéric Brun (FRA)	Bretagne–Séché Environnement	+ 23"
8	Zhang Wenlong (CHN)	Giant–Champion System	+ 24"
9	Liu Jianpeng (CHN)	Hengxiang Cycling Team	+ 24"
10	Robin Manullang (INA)	Pegasus Continental Cycling Team	+ 25"

=== Stage 5 ===
12 March 2015 — Kuala Terengganu to Kuantan, 200.0 km (124 mi)

Stage 5 result
Rank	Rider	Team	Time
1	Seo Joon-yong (KOR)	KSPO	4h 18' 47"
2	Jamalidin Novardianto (INA)	Pegasus Continental Cycling Team	+ 13"
3	Adiq Husainie Othman (MYS)	Terengganu Cycling Team	+ 13"
4	Yasuharu Nakajima (JPN)	Aisan Racing Team	+ 13"
5	Patria Rastra (INA)	Pegasus Continental Cycling Team	+ 13"
6	Maher Hasnaoui (TUN)	Skydive Dubai–Al Ahli	+ 13"
7	Juan Sebastián Molano (COL)	Colombia	+ 15"
8	Loh Sea Keong (MYS)	Malaysia (national team)	+ 35"
9	Ma Guangtong (CHN)	Hengxiang Cycling Team	+ 5' 20"
10	Bai Li Jun (CHN)	Giant–Champion System	+ 5' 20"

General classification after Stage 5
Rank	Rider	Team	Time
1	Caleb Ewan (AUS)	Orica–GreenEDGE	19h 18' 27"
2	Natnael Berhane (ERI)	MTN–Qhubeka	+ 17"
3	Youcef Reguigui (ALG)	MTN–Qhubeka	+ 20"
4	Pierre-Luc Périchon (FRA)	Bretagne–Séché Environnement	+ 20"
5	Francisco Mancebo (ESP)	Skydive Dubai–Al Ahli	+ 20"
6	Leonardo Duque (COL)	Colombia	+ 22"
7	Frédéric Brun (FRA)	Bretagne–Séché Environnement	+ 23"
8	Zhang Wenlong (CHN)	Giant–Champion System	+ 24"
9	Liu Jianpeng (CHN)	Hengxiang Cycling Team	+ 24"
10	Robin Manullang (INA)	Pegasus Continental Cycling Team	+ 25"

=== Stage 6 ===
13 March 2015 — Maran to Karak, 96.6 km (60 mi)

Stage 6 result
Rank	Rider	Team	Time
1	Caleb Ewan (AUS)	Orica–GreenEDGE	2h 14' 19"
2	Jakub Mareczko (ITA)	Southeast Pro Cycling	+ 0"
3	Christopher Sutton (AUS)	Team Sky	+ 0"
4	Juan Sebastián Molano (COL)	Colombia	+ 0"
5	Andrea Guardini (ITA)	Astana	+ 0"
6	Alessandro Petacchi (ITA)	Southeast Pro Cycling	+ 0"
7	Michael Kolář (SVK)	Tinkoff–Saxo	+ 0"
8	Youcef Reguigui (ALG)	MTN–Qhubeka	+ 0"
9	Ahmet Örken (TUR)	Torku Şekerspor	+ 0"
10	Arin Iswana (INA)	Pegasus Continental Cycling Team	+ 0"

General classification after Stage 6
Rank	Rider	Team	Time
1	Caleb Ewan (AUS)	Orica–GreenEDGE	21h 32' 36"
2	Natnael Berhane (ERI)	MTN–Qhubeka	+ 27"
3	Youcef Reguigui (ALG)	MTN–Qhubeka	+ 30"
4	Pierre-Luc Périchon (FRA)	Bretagne–Séché Environnement	+ 30"
5	Francisco Mancebo (ESP)	Skydive Dubai–Al Ahli	+ 30"
6	Leonardo Duque (COL)	Colombia	+ 32"
7	Frédéric Brun (FRA)	Bretagne–Séché Environnement	+ 33"
8	Zhang Wenlong (CHN)	Giant–Champion System	+ 34"
9	Liu Jianpeng (CHN)	Hengxiang Cycling Team	+ 34"
10	Robin Manullang (INA)	Pegasus Continental Cycling Team	+ 35"

=== Stage 7 ===
14 March 2015 — Shah Alam to Fraser's Hill, 180.8 km (112 mi)

Stage 7 result
Rank	Rider	Team	Time
1	Youcef Reguigui (ALG)	MTN–Qhubeka	4h 38' 41"
2	Sebastián Henao (COL)	Team Sky	+ 0"
3	Valerio Agnoli (ITA)	Astana	+ 0"
4	Luca Chirico (ITA)	Bardiani–CSF	+ 0"
5	Francisco Mancebo (ESP)	Skydive Dubai–Al Ahli	+ 0"
6	Pieter Weening (NED)	Orica–GreenEDGE	+ 0"
7	Jacques Janse van Rensburg (RSA)	MTN–Qhubeka	+ 0"
8	Rodolfo Torres (COL)	Colombia	+ 0"
9	Jesper Hansen (DEN)	Tinkoff–Saxo	+ 0"
10	Pierre-Luc Périchon (FRA)	Bretagne–Séché Environnement	+ 0"

General classification after Stage 7
Rank	Rider	Team	Time
1	Youcef Reguigui (ALG)	MTN–Qhubeka	26h 11' 37"
2	Sebastián Henao (COL)	Team Sky	+ 10"
3	Pierre-Luc Périchon (FRA)	Bretagne–Séché Environnement	+ 10"
4	Francisco Mancebo (ESP)	Skydive Dubai–Al Ahli	+ 10"
5	Valerio Agnoli (ITA)	Astana	+ 12"
6	Luca Chirico (ITA)	Bardiani–CSF	+ 16"
7	Jesper Hansen (DEN)	Tinkoff–Saxo	+ 16"
8	Rodolfo Torres (COL)	Colombia	+ 16"
9	Jacques Janse van Rensburg (RSA)	MTN–Qhubeka	+ 16"
10	Ian Boswell (USA)	Team Sky	+ 22"

=== Stage 8 ===
15 March 2015 — Kuala Kubu Bharu to Kuala Lumpur, 96.1 km (60 mi)

Stage 8 result
Rank	Rider	Team	Time
1	Andrea Guardini (ITA)	Astana	2h 00' 27"
2	Caleb Ewan (AUS)	Orica–GreenEDGE	+ 0"
3	Michael Kolář (SVK)	Tinkoff–Saxo	+ 0"
4	Francesco Chicchi (ITA)	Androni Giocattoli	+ 0"
5	Alessandro Petacchi (ITA)	Southeast Pro Cycling	+ 0"
6	Oleksandr Surutkovych (UKR)	Synergy Baku	+ 0"
7	Anuar Manan (MYS)	Terengganu Cycling Team	+ 0"
8	Sebastián Henao (COL)	Team Sky	+ 0"
9	Ken Hanson (USA)	UnitedHealthcare	+ 0"
10	Youcef Reguigui (ALG)	MTN–Qhubeka	+ 0"

Final general classification
Rank	Rider	Team	Time
1	Youcef Reguigui (ALG)	MTN–Qhubeka	28h 12' 04"
2	Valerio Agnoli (ITA)	Astana	+ 9"
3	Sebastián Henao (COL)	Team Sky	+ 10"
4	Pierre-Luc Périchon (FRA)	Bretagne–Séché Environnement	+ 10"
5	Francisco Mancebo (ESP)	Skydive Dubai–Al Ahli	+ 10"
6	Jesper Hansen (DEN)	Tinkoff–Saxo	+ 14"
7	Luca Chirico (ITA)	Bardiani–CSF	+ 16"
8	Rodolfo Torres (COL)	Colombia	+ 16"
9	Jacques Janse van Rensburg (RSA)	MTN–Qhubeka	+ 16"
10	Ian Boswell (USA)	Team Sky	+ 22"

== Classification leadership table ==
In the 2015 Tour de Langkawi, four different jerseys were awarded. For the general classification, calculated by adding each cyclist's finishing times on each stage, and allowing time bonuses for the first three finishers at intermediate sprints and at the finish of mass-start stages, the leader received a yellow jersey. This classification was considered the most important of the 2015 Tour de Langkawi, and the winner of the classification was considered the winner of the race.

Additionally, there was a points classification, which awarded a blue jersey. In the points classification, cyclists received points for finishing in the top 15 in a mass-start stage. For winning a stage, a rider earned 15 points, with a point fewer per place down to a single point for 15th place. Points towards the classification could also be accrued at intermediate sprint points during each stage; these intermediate sprints also offered bonus seconds towards the general classification. There was also a mountains classification, the leadership of which was marked by a red jersey. In the mountains classification, points were won by reaching the top of a climb before other cyclists, with more points available for the higher-categorised climbs.

The fourth jersey represented the Asian rider classification, marked by a white jersey. This was decided in the same way as the general classification, but only riders from Asia were eligible to be ranked in the classification. There was also a classification for teams, in which the times of the best three cyclists in a team on each stage were added together; the leading team at the end of the race was the team with the lowest cumulative time, while there was also an Asian-only variant for the teams as well.

Stage	Winner	General classification	Points classification	Mountains classification	Asian rider classification	Team classification	Asian team classification
1	Andrea Guardini	Andrea Guardini	Andrea Guardini	Kiel Reijnen	Ma Guangtong	Astana	Terengganu Cycling Team
2	Andrea Guardini	Andrea Guardini	Andrea Guardini	Kiel Reijnen	Adiq Husainie Othman	Astana	Terengganu Cycling Team
3	Caleb Ewan	Caleb Ewan	Caleb Ewan	Kiel Reijnen	Zhang Wenlong	MTN–Qhubeka	Pegasus Continental Cycling Team
4	Andrea Guardini	Caleb Ewan	Caleb Ewan	Kiel Reijnen	Zhang Wenlong	MTN–Qhubeka	Pegasus Continental Cycling Team
5	Seo Joon-yong	Caleb Ewan	Caleb Ewan	Kiel Reijnen	Zhang Wenlong	Pegasus Continental Cycling Team	Pegasus Continental Cycling Team
6	Caleb Ewan	Caleb Ewan	Caleb Ewan	Kiel Reijnen	Zhang Wenlong	Pegasus Continental Cycling Team	Pegasus Continental Cycling Team
7	Youcef Reguigui	Youcef Reguigui	Caleb Ewan	Kiel Reijnen	Tomohiro Hayakawa	Pegasus Continental Cycling Team	Pegasus Continental Cycling Team
8	Andrea Guardini	Youcef Reguigui	Caleb Ewan	Kiel Reijnen	Tomohiro Hayakawa	Pegasus Continental Cycling Team	Pegasus Continental Cycling Team
Final		Youcef Reguigui	Caleb Ewan	Kiel Reijnen	Tomohiro Hayakawa	Pegasus Continental Cycling Team	Pegasus Continental Cycling Team

== Final standings ==
=== General classification ===
Final general classification (1–10)
Rank	Rider	Team	Time
1	Youcef Reguigui (ALG)	MTN–Qhubeka	28h 12' 04"
2	Valerio Agnoli (ITA)	Astana	+ 9"
3	Sebastián Henao (COL)	Team Sky	+ 10"
4	Pierre-Luc Périchon (FRA)	Bretagne–Séché Environnement	+ 10"
5	Francisco Mancebo (ESP)	Skydive Dubai–Al Ahli	+ 10"
6	Jesper Hansen (DEN)	Tinkoff–Saxo	+ 14"
7	Luca Chirico (ITA)	Bardiani–CSF	+ 16"
8	Rodolfo Torres (COL)	Colombia	+ 16"
9	Jacques Janse van Rensburg (RSA)	MTN–Qhubeka	+ 16"
10	Ian Boswell (USA)	Team Sky	+ 22"

Final general classification (11–106)
Rank	Rider	Team	Time
11	Pieter Weening (NED)	Orica–GreenEDGE	+ 28"
12	Leonardo Duque (COL)	Colombia	+ 50"
13	Edward Beltrán (COL)	Tinkoff–Saxo	+ 1' 00"
14	Natnael Berhane (ERI)	MTN–Qhubeka	+ 1' 01"
15	Frédéric Brun (FRA)	Bretagne–Séché Environnement	+ 1' 44"
16	Tomohiro Hayakawa (JPN)	Aisan Racing Team	+ 1' 47"
17	Lucas Euser (USA)	UnitedHealthcare	+ 1' 55"
18	František Paďour (CZE)	Androni Giocattoli	+ 2' 00"
19	Tomasz Marczyński (POL)	Torku Şekerspor	+ 2' 18"
20	Kevin Seeldraeyers (BEL)	Torku Şekerspor	+ 2' 18"
21	Carlos Gálviz (VEN)	Androni Giocattoli	+ 2' 35"
22	Rafaâ Chtioui (TUN)	Skydive Dubai–Al Ahli	+ 2' 52"
23	Liu Jianpeng (CHN)	Hengxiang Cycling Team	+ 2' 53"
24	Marco Frapporti (ITA)	Androni Giocattoli	+ 3' 07"
25	Dadi Suryadi (INA)	Pegasus Continental Cycling Team	+ 3' 25"
26	Bruno Pires (POR)	Tinkoff–Saxo	+ 3' 28"
27	Philip Deignan (IRL)	Team Sky	+ 3' 31"
28	Robin Manullang (INA)	Pegasus Continental Cycling Team	+ 4' 07"
29	Daniel Martínez (COL)	Colombia	+ 4' 08"
30	Pavel Brutt (RUS)	Tinkoff–Saxo	+ 4' 38"
31	Alessio Taliani (ITA)	Androni Giocattoli	+ 5' 54"
32	Kiel Reijnen (USA)	UnitedHealthcare	+ 6' 03"
33	Soufiane Haddi (MAR)	Skydive Dubai–Al Ahli	+ 6' 32"
34	Romain Feillu (FRA)	Bretagne–Séché Environnement	+ 7' 29"
35	Chelly Aristya (INA)	Pegasus Continental Cycling Team	+ 8' 45"
36	Danny Pate (USA)	Team Sky	+ 11' 49"
37	Caleb Ewan (AUS)	Orica–GreenEDGE	+ 14' 02"
38	Zhang Wenlong (CHN)	Giant–Champion System	+ 14' 12"
39	Adiq Husainie Othman (MAS)	Terengganu Cycling Team	+ 16' 00"
40	Jamalidin Novardianto (INA)	Pegasus Continental Cycling Team	+ 16' 22"
41	Leigh Howard (AUS)	Orica–GreenEDGE	+ 21' 53"
42	Jonathan Clarke (AUS)	UnitedHealthcare	+ 22' 06"
43	Ma Guangtong (CHN)	Hengxiang Cycling Team	+ 23' 40"
44	Loh Sea Keong (MAS)	Malaysia (national team)	+ 26' 09"
45	Juan Sebastián Molano (COL)	Colombia	+ 27' 11"
46	Miraç Kal (TUR)	Torku Şekerspor	+ 28' 46"
47	Goh Choon Huat (SIN)	Terengganu Cycling Team	+ 28' 56"
48	Elchin Asadov (AZE)	Synergy Baku	+ 29' 09"
49	Bai Lijun (CHN)	Giant–Champion System	+ 29' 12"
50	Vladimir Gusev (RUS)	Skydive Dubai–Al Ahli	+ 29' 21"
51	Afiq Huznie Othman (MAS)	National Sport Council of Malaysia Cycling Team	+ 29' 48"
52	Hideto Nakane (JPN)	Aisan Racing Team	+ 29' 54"
53	Rafael Andriato (BRA)	Southeast Pro Cycling	+ 31' 05"
54	Sam Bewley (NZL)	Orica–GreenEDGE	+ 31' 12"
55	Gu Yingchuan (CHN)	Giant–Champion System	+ 31' 37"
56	Alessandro Tonelli (ITA)	Bardiani–CSF	+ 31' 50"
57	Yasuharu Nakajima (JPN)	Aisan Racing Team	+ 31' 53"
58	Oleksandr Surutkovytch (UKR)	Synergy Baku	+ 32' 57"
59	John Ebsen (DEN)	Androni Giocattoli	+ 34' 19"
60	Jean-Marc Bideau (FRA)	Bretagne–Séché Environnement	+ 34' 38"
61	Maher Hasnaoui (TUN)	Skydive Dubai–Al Ahli	+ 36' 08"
62	Seo Joon-yong (KOR)	KSPO	+ 36' 16"
63	Alessandro Petacchi (ITA)	Southeast Pro Cycling	+ 36' 53"
64	Samir Jabrayilov (AZE)	Synergy Baku	+ 37' 04"
65	Wang Meiyin (CHN)	Hengxiang Cycling Team	+ 37' 38"
66	Nazim Bakırcı (TUR)	Torku Şekerspor	+ 37' 44"
67	Kwon Soon-yeong (KOR)	KSPO	+ 38' 06"
68	Mohd Zawawi Azman (MAS)	National Sport Council of Malaysia Cycling Team	+ 38' 34"
69	Andrea Guardini (ITA)	Astana	+ 38' 41"
70	Simone Sterbini (ITA)	Bardiani–CSF	+ 39' 49"
71	Adam Blythe (GBR)	Orica–GreenEDGE	+ 40' 19"
72	Wang Bo (CHN)	Hengxiang Cycling Team	+ 40' 43"
73	Yeon Je-sung (KOR)	KSPO	+ 41' 30"
74	Park Sung-baek (KOR)	KSPO	+ 43' 17"
75	Sergiy Grechyn (UKR)	Torku Şekerspor	+ 43' 17"
76	Mohd Zamri Saleh (MAS)	Terengganu Cycling Team	+ 43' 17"
77	Ken Hanson (USA)	UnitedHealthcare	+ 43' 21"
78	Anuar Manan (MAS)	Terengganu Cycling Team	+ 45' 10"
79	Ahmet Örken (TUR)	Torku Şekerspor	+ 45' 14"
80	Arin Iswana (INA)	Pegasus Continental Cycling Team	+ 45' 14"
81	Shinpei Fukuda (JPN)	Aisan Racing Team	+ 45' 18"
82	Sofian Nabil Omar Bakri (MAS)	National Sport Council of Malaysia Cycling Team	+ 45' 28"
83	Francesco Chicchi (ITA)	Androni Giocattoli	+ 45' 37"
84	Sun Xiaolong (CHN)	Giant–Champion System	+ 45' 43"
85	Mohd Saiful Anuar Aziz (MAS)	Terengganu Cycling Team	+ 46' 11"
86	Liam Bertazzo (ITA)	Southeast Pro Cycling	+ 46' 38"
87	Zhang Zheng (CHN)	Hengxiang Cycling Team	+ 47' 35"
88	Ryohei Komori (JPN)	Aisan Racing Team	+ 47' 40"
89	Mohd Izzat Hilmi Abdul Halil (MAS)	Malaysia (national team)	+ 48' 00"
90	Michael Kolář (SVK)	Tinkoff–Saxo	+ 48' 07"
91	Nicolas Dougall (RSA)	MTN–Qhubeka	+ 49' 03"
92	Takeaki Ayabe (JPN)	Aisan Racing Team	+ 50' 42"
93	Mohammed Al Murawwi (UAE)	Skydive Dubai–Al Ahli	+ 51' 53"
94	Andrea Dal Col (ITA)	Southeast Pro Cycling	+ 52' 30"
95	Maxat Ayazbayev (KAZ)	Astana	+ 52' 40"
96	Nik Mohd Azwan Zulkifle (MAS)	National Sport Council of Malaysia Cycling Team	+ 52' 53"
97	Amir Mustafa Rusli (MAS)	National Sport Council of Malaysia Cycling Team	+ 52' 57"
98	Mohd Ameer Ahmad Kamal (MAS)	Malaysia (national team)	+ 53' 11"
99	Xue Cheng (CHN)	Giant–Champion System	+ 53' 13"
100	Mohamad Fairet Rusli (MAS)	National Sport Council of Malaysia Cycling Team	+ 54' 08"
101	Suhardi Hassan (MAS)	Malaysia (national team)	+ 54' 29"
102	Nathan Earle (AUS)	Team Sky	+ 54' 58"
103	Enver Asanov (AZE)	Synergy Baku	+ 55' 06"
104	Muhammad Faruq Daud (MAS)	Malaysia (national team)	+ 55' 13"
105	Damien Howson (AUS)	Orica–GreenEDGE	+ 56' 44"
106	Maxime Cam (FRA)	Bretagne–Séché Environnement	+ 56' 57"

=== Points classification ===
Points classification (1–10)
Rank	Rider	Team	Points
1	Caleb Ewan (AUS)	Orica–GreenEDGE	89
2	Andrea Guardini (ITA)	Astana	71
3	Youcef Reguigui (ALG)	MTN–Qhubeka	69
4	Francesco Chicchi (ITA)	Androni Giocattoli	43
5	Romain Feillu (FRA)	Bretagne–Séché Environnement	41
6	Jamalidin Novardianto (INA)	Pegasus Continental Cycling Team	37
7	Juan Sebastián Molano (COL)	Colombia	37
8	Ken Hanson (USA)	UnitedHealthcare	32
9	Adiq Husainie Othman (MAS)	Terengganu Cycling Team	31
10	Rafaâ Chtioui (TUN)	Skydive Dubai–Al Ahli	29

Points classification (11–63)
Rank	Rider	Team	Points
11	Valerio Agnoli (ITA)	Astana	29
12	Sebastián Henao (COL)	Team Sky	29
13	Ahmet Örken (TUR)	Torku Şekerspor	28
14	Oleksandr Surutkovytch (UKR)	Synergy Baku	25
15	Seo Joon-yong (KOR)	KSPO	24
16	Luca Chirico (ITA)	Bardiani–CSF	24
17	Shinpei Fukuda (JPN)	Aisan Racing Team	24
18	Michael Kolář (SVK)	Tinkoff–Saxo	24
19	Liam Bertazzo (ITA)	Southeast Pro Cycling	22
20	Leonardo Duque (COL)	Colombia	22
21	Anuar Manan (MAS)	Terengganu Cycling Team	22
22	Natnael Berhane (ERI)	MTN–Qhubeka	21
23	Alessandro Petacchi (ITA)	Southeast Pro Cycling	21
24	Francisco Mancebo (ESP)	Skydive Dubai–Al Ahli	20
25	Pierre-Luc Périchon (FRA)	Bretagne–Séché Environnement	16
26	Ma Guangtong (CHN)	Hengxiang Cycling Team	15
27	Loh Sea Keong (MAS)	Malaysia (national team)	14
28	Andrea Dal Col (ITA)	Southeast Pro Cycling	13
29	Yasuharu Nakajima (JPN)	Aisan Racing Team	12
30	Jesper Hansen (DEN)	Tinkoff–Saxo	10
31	Pieter Weening (NED)	Orica–GreenEDGE	10
32	Elchin Asadov (AZE)	Synergy Baku	10
33	Maher Hasnaoui (TUN)	Skydive Dubai–Al Ahli	10
34	Jacques Janse van Rensburg (RSA)	MTN–Qhubeka	9
35	Nik Mohd Azwan Zulkifle (MAS)	National Sport Council of Malaysia Cycling Team	8
36	Rodolfo Torres (COL)	Colombia	8
37	Marco Frapporti (ITA)	Androni Giocattoli	8
38	Wang Meiyin (CHN)	Hengxiang Cycling Team	7
39	Frédéric Brun (FRA)	Bretagne–Séché Environnement	7
40	Kwon Soon-yeong (KOR)	KSPO	7
41	Park Sung-baek (KOR)	KSPO	7
42	Alessio Taliani (ITA)	Androni Giocattoli	6
43	Kiel Reijnen (USA)	UnitedHealthcare	6
44	Bai Lijun (CHN)	Giant–Champion System	6
45	Arin Iswana (INA)	Pegasus Continental Cycling Team	6
46	Ryohei Komori (JPN)	Aisan Racing Team	6
47	Elchin Asadov (AZE)	Synergy Baku	6
48	Ian Boswell (USA)	Team Sky	5
49	Bruno Pires (POR)	Tinkoff–Saxo	5
50	Jonathan Clarke (AUS)	UnitedHealthcare	5
51	Wang Bo (CHN)	Hengxiang Cycling Team	5
52	Sun Xiaolong (CHN)	Giant–Champion System	5
53	Liu Jianpeng (CHN)	Hengxiang Cycling Team	4
54	Robin Manullang (INA)	Pegasus Continental Cycling Team	4
55	Vladimir Gusev (RUS)	Skydive Dubai–Al Ahli	4
56	Edward Beltrán (COL)	Tinkoff–Saxo	3
57	Zhang Wenlong (CHN)	Giant–Champion System	3
58	Sofian Nabil Omar Bakri (MAS)	National Sport Council of Malaysia Cycling Team	3
59	Nazim Bakirci (TUR)	Torku Şekerspor	2
60	Soufiane Haddi (MAR)	Skydive Dubai–Al Ahli	1
61	Chelly Aristya (INA)	Pegasus Continental Cycling Team	1
62	Leigh Howard (AUS)	Orica–GreenEDGE	1
63	Mohd Zamri Saleh (MAS)	Terengganu Cycling Team	1

=== Mountains classification ===
Mountains classification (1–10)
Rank	Rider	Team	Points
1	Kiel Reijnen (USA)	UnitedHealthcare	39
2	Francisco Mancebo (ESP)	Skydive Dubai–Al Ahli	20
3	Natnael Berhane (ERI)	MTN–Qhubeka	18
4	Youcef Reguigui (ALG)	MTN–Qhubeka	15
5	Nik Mohd. Azwan Zulkifli (MAS)	National Sport Council of Malaysia Cycling Team	14
6	Soufiane Haddi (MAR)	Skydive Dubai–Al Ahli	14
7	Sebastián Henao (COL)	Team Sky	12
8	Valerio Agnoli (ITA)	Astana	10
9	Frédéric Brun (FRA)	Bretagne–Séché Environnement	10
10	Jonathan Clarke (AUS)	UnitedHealthcare	8

Mountains classification (11–31)
Rank	Rider	Team	Points
11	Luca Chirico (ITA)	Bardiani–CSF	8
12	Park Sung-baek (KOR)	KSPO	8
13	Francesco Chicchi (ITA)	Androni Giocattoli	8
14	Maher Hasnaoui (TUN)	Skydive Dubai–Al Ahli	7
15	Pieter Weening (NED)	Orica–GreenEDGE	6
16	Adiq Husainie Othman (MAS)	Terengganu Cycling Team	5
17	Liam Bertazzo (ITA)	Southeast Pro Cycling	5
18	Jamalidin Novardianto (INA)	Pegasus Continental Cycling Team	4
19	Elchin Asadov (AZE)	Synergy Baku	4
20	Rafaâ Chtioui (TUN)	Skydive Dubai–Al Ahli	4
21	Pavel Brutt (RUS)	Tinkoff–Saxo	4
22	Jacques Janse van Rensburg (RSA)	MTN–Qhubeka	2
23	Leonardo Duque (COL)	Colombia	2
24	Liu Jianpeng (CHN)	Hengxiang Cycling Team	2
25	Afiq Huznie Othman (MAS)	National Sport Council of Malaysia Cycling Team	2
26	Seo Joon-yong (KOR)	KSPO	2
27	Wang Meiyin (CHN)	Hengxiang Cycling Team	2
28	Rodolfo Torres (COL)	Colombia	1
29	Dadi Suryadi (INA)	Pegasus Continental Cycling Team	1
30	Bruno Pires (POR)	Tinkoff–Saxo	1
31	Leigh Howard (AUS)	Orica–GreenEDGE	1

=== Asian rider classification ===
Asian rider classification (1–10)
Rank	Rider	Team	Time
1	Tomohiro Hayakawa (JPN)	Aisan Racing Team	28h 13' 51"
2	Liu Jianpeng (CHN)	Hengxiang Cycling Team	+ 1' 06"
3	Dadi Suryadi (INA)	Pegasus Continental Cycling Team	+ 1' 38"
4	Robin Manullang (INA)	Pegasus Continental Cycling Team	+ 2' 20"
5	Chelly Aristya (INA)	Pegasus Continental Cycling Team	+ 6' 58"
6	Zhang Wenlong (CHN)	Giant–Champion System	+ 12' 25"
7	Adiq Husainie Othman (MAS)	Terengganu Cycling Team	+ 14' 13"
8	Jamalidin Novardianto (INA)	Pegasus Continental Cycling Team	+ 14' 35"
9	Ma Guangtong (CHN)	Hengxiang Cycling Team	+ 21' 53"
10	Loh Sea Keong (MAS)	Malaysia (national team)	+ 24' 22"

Asian rider classification (11–43)
Rank	Rider	Team	Time
11	Goh Choon Huat (SIN)	Terengganu Cycling Team	+ 27' 09"
12	Bai Lijun (CHN)	Giant–Champion System	+ 27' 25"
13	Afiq Huznie Othman (MAS)	National Sport Council of Malaysia Cycling Team	+ 28' 01"
14	Hideto Nakane (JPN)	Aisan Racing Team	+ 28' 07"
15	Gu Yingchuan (CHN)	Giant–Champion System	+ 29' 50"
16	Yasuharu Nakajima (JPN)	Aisan Racing Team	+ 30' 06"
17	Seo Joon-yong (KOR)	KSPO	+ 34' 29"
18	Wang Meiyin (CHN)	Hengxiang Cycling Team	+ 35' 51"
19	Kwon Soon-yeong (KOR)	KSPO	+ 36' 19"
20	Mohd Zawawi Azman (MAS)	National Sport Council of Malaysia Cycling Team	+ 36' 47"
21	Wang Bo (CHN)	Hengxiang Cycling Team	+ 38' 50"
22	Yeon Je-sung (KOR)	KSPO	+ 39' 43"
23	Park Sung-baek (KOR)	KSPO	+ 41' 30"
24	Mohd Zamri Saleh (MAS)	Terengganu Cycling Team	+ 41' 30"
25	Anuar Manan (MAS)	Terengganu Cycling Team	+ 43' 23"
26	Arin Iswana (INA)	Pegasus Continental Cycling Team	+ 43' 27"
27	Shinpei Fukuda (JPN)	Aisan Racing Team	+ 43' 31"
28	Sofian Nabil Omar Bakri (MAS)	National Sport Council of Malaysia Cycling Team	+ 43' 41"
29	Sun Xiaolong (CHN)	Giant–Champion System	+ 43' 56"
30	Mohd Saiful Anuar Aziz (MAS)	Terengganu Cycling Team	+ 44' 24"
31	Zhang Zheng (CHN)	Hengxiang Cycling Team	+ 45' 48"
32	Ryohei Komori (JPN)	Aisan Racing Team	+ 45' 53"
33	Mohd Izzat Hilmi Abdul Halil (MAS)	Malaysia (national team)	+ 46' 13"
34	Takeaki Ayabe (JPN)	Aisan Racing Team	+ 48' 55"
35	Mohammed Al Murawwi (UAE)	Skydive Dubai–Al Ahli	+ 50' 06"
36	Maxat Ayazbayev (KAZ)	Astana	+ 50' 53"
37	Nik Mohd Azwan Zulkifle (MAS)	National Sport Council of Malaysia Cycling Team	+ 51' 06"
38	Amir Mustafa Rusli (MAS)	National Sport Council of Malaysia Cycling Team	+ 51' 10"
39	Mohd Ameer Ahmad Kamal (MAS)	Malaysia (national team)	+ 51' 24"
40	Xue Cheng (CHN)	Giant–Champion System	+ 51' 26"
41	Mohamad Fairet Rusli (MAS)	National Sport Council of Malaysia Cycling Team	+ 52' 21"
42	Suhardi Hassan (MAS)	Malaysia (national team)	+ 52' 42"
43	Muhammad Faruq Daud (MAS)	Malaysia (national team)	+ 53' 26"

=== Team classification ===
Team classification (1–10)
Rank	Team	Time
1	Pegasus Continental Cycling Team	84h 22' 01"
2	Colombia	+ 5' 08"
3	Skydive Dubai–Al Ahli	+ 8' 02"
4	MTN–Qhubeka	+ 15' 53"
5	Team Sky	+ 18' 20"
6	Tinkoff–Saxo	+ 18' 58"
7	Androni Giocattoli	+ 21' 53"
8	Bretagne–Séché Environnement	+ 22' 22"
9	UnitedHealthcare	+ 33' 36"
10	Orica–GreenEDGE	+ 34' 04"

Team classification (11–22)
Rank	Team	Time
11	Torku Şekerspor	+ 47' 29"
12	Hengxiang Cycling Team	+ 1h 10' 35"
13	Astana	+ 1h 13' 51"
14	Aisan Racing Team	+ 1h 15' 35"
15	Giant–Champion System	+ 1h 22' 50"
16	Bardiani–CSF	+ 1h 23' 36"
17	Terengganu Cycling Team	+ 1h 41' 43"
18	KSPO	+ 1h 46' 16"
19	Synergy Baku	+ 1h 52' 56"
20	Southeast Pro Cycling	+ 1h 59' 42"
21	National Sport Council of Malaysia Cycling Team	+ 2h 07' 21"
22	Malaysia (national team)	+ 2h 15' 29"

=== Asian team classification ===
Asian team classification (1–8)
Rank	Team	Time
1	Pegasus Continental Cycling Team	84h 22' 01"
2	Hengxiang Cycling Team	+ 1h 10' 35"
3	Aisan Racing Team	+ 1h 15' 35"
4	Giant–Champion System	+ 1h 22' 50"
5	Terengganu Cycling Team	+ 1h 41' 43"
6	KSPO	+ 1h 46' 16"
7	National Sport Council of Malaysia Cycling Team	+ 2h 07' 21"
8	Malaysia (national team)	+ 2h 15' 29"

=== Riders who failed to finish ===
25 riders failed to finish the race.
Rider	Team
Ramón Carretero (PAN)	Southeast Pro Cycling
Liu Xinyang (CHN)	Giant–Champion System
Florian Guillou (FRA)	Bretagne–Séché Environnement
Gao Zhikang (CHN)	Hengxiang Cycling Team
Elgun Alizada (AZE)	Synergy Baku
Daniele Ratto (ITA)	UnitedHealthcare
Gong Hyo-suk (KOR)	KSPO
Merhawi Kudus (ERI)	MTN–Qhubeka
Mohd Ameen Ahmad Kamal (MAS)	Malaysia (national team)
Bakhtiyar Kozhatayev (KAZ)	Astana
Daniil Fominykh (KAZ)	Astana
Andrey Zeits (KAZ)	Astana
Christopher Sutton (AUS)	Team Sky
Daniel Teklehaimanot (ERI)	MTN–Qhubeka
Simone Andreetta (ITA)	Bardiani–CSF
Nikolay Trusov (RUS)	Tinkoff–Saxo
Edward Díaz (COL)	Colombia
Luca Sterbini (ITA)	Bardiani–CSF
Edward Díaz (COL)	Colombia
Harrif Saleh (MAS)	Terengganu Cycling Team
Patria Rastra (INA)	Pegasus Continental Cycling Team
Kim Hyeon-seok (KOR)	KSPO
Darwin Pantoja (COL)	Colombia
Isaac Bolívar (COL)	UnitedHealthcare
Jakub Mareczko (ITA)	Southeast Pro Cycling
