= Jaun =

Jaun may refer to:

- Jaun Elia, pen name of Pakistani poet Syed Hussain Sibt-e-Asghar Naqvi (1931–2002)
- Jaun Kotzé (born 1992), South African rugby union player
- Lukas Jaun (born 1991), Swiss former racing cyclist
- Jaun, Switzerland, a municipality
  - Jaun Pass, a mountain pass in the Swiss Alps connecting the municipality and Charmey
- Jaun Valley, Austria

== See also ==
- Jaunbach, 'Jaun Creek', a river in Switzerland also known as the Jogne
- Jaun Zuria (Basque for "the White Lord"), mythical first lord and founder of the Lordship of Biscay
