= Chinese National Road Championships =

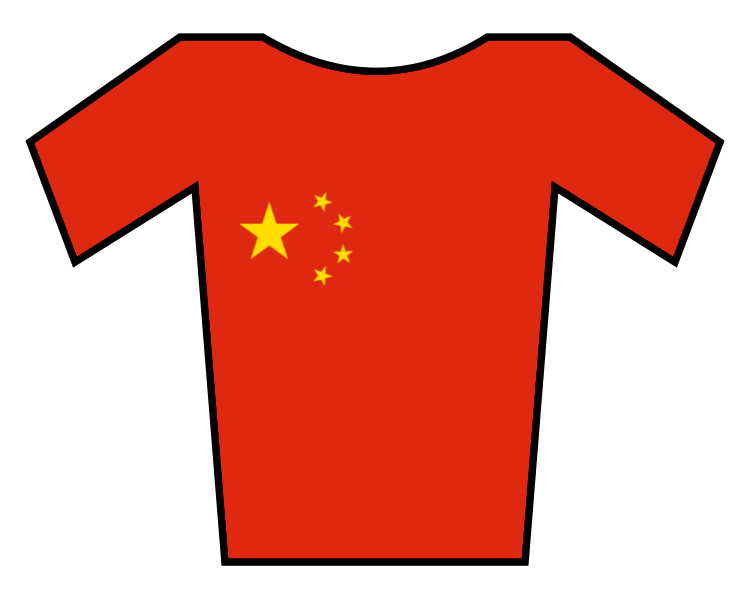

Race details
- Date: June
- Discipline: Road
- Type: One-day race
- Organiser: Chinese Cycling Association

The Chinese National Road Championships are held annually to decide the cycling champions in both the road race and time trial discipline, across various categories.

== Men ==
=== Road race ===
Year	Winner	Second	Third
2007	Xu Gong	Guo Hui	Deng Hongye
2009	Xu Gong	Liu Bo	Yu Shijie
2012	Xu Gong	Wang Meiyin	Kwok Ho Ting (Hong Kong)
2013	Shuang Shan	Qiao Feng	Wong Kam Po (Hong Kong)
2014	Zhao Jingbiao	Niu Yikui	Cao Xi
2015	Hou Yake	Xue Chaohua	Wang Meiyin
2016	Ma Guangtong	Liu Jiankun	Xue Chaohua
2017	Zhao Jingbiao	Ma Guangtong	Yang Haoran
2019	Xue Chaohua	Niu Yikui	Ma Binyan
2020	Wang Meiyin	Wang Ruidong	Wa Junjie

=== Time trial ===
Year	Winner	Second	Third
2006	Song Baoqing	Ma Haijun	Li Fuyu
2007	Song Baoqing	Ma Haijun	Ji Xitao
2009	Li Fuyu	Luo Jianshi	Zhang Weilong
2011	Cheung King Lok (Hong Kong)	Liu Bao	Luo Jianshi
2012	Xue Mingxing	Cheung King Lok (Hong Kong)	Wang Meiyin
2013	Cheung King Lok (Hong Kong)	Chen Libin	Li Wei
2014	Wu Nan	Jiang Zhihui	Ziao Jingbiao
2015	Wu Nan	Xu Yulong	Wang Fengnian
2016	Xu Yulong	Liu Jiankun	Guo Liang
2017	Cheung King Lok (Hong Kong)	Xu Yulong	Lau Wan Hei Victor (Hong Kong)
2019	Shi Hang	Chen Libin	Bai Lijun
2020	Xue Ming	Liu Hao	Bai Lijun

== Women ==
Year	Road Race	Time Trial
1998	Wang Shuging	Zhao Haijuan
2007	Zhao Na	Li Meifang
2019	Zhao Xisha	Shen Shanrong
2020	Tang Xin	
