= 2010 GP Miguel Induráin =

Race details
- Dates: 3 April 2010
- Stages: 1
- Distance: 179.3 km (111.4 mi)
- Winning time: 4h 52' 40"

Results
	Winner	Joaquim Rodríguez (ESP)
	Second	Michel Kreder (NED)
	Third	Fabian Wegmann (RUS)

The 2010 GP Miguel Induráin was the 57th edition of the GP Miguel Induráin cycle race and was held on 3 April 2010. The race started and finished in Estella. The race was won by Joaquim Rodríguez.

== General classification ==
Final general classification

Rank	Rider	Time
1	Joaquim Rodríguez (ESP)	4h 52' 40"
~~2~~	~~Alejandro Valverde (ESP)~~	~~+ 6"~~
2	Michel Kreder (NED)	+ 8"
3	Alexandr Kolobnev (RUS)	+ 10"
4	Rubén Pérez (ESP)	+ 12"
5	Beñat Intxausti (ESP)	+ 14"
6	Mauro Finetto (ITA)	+ 14"
7	Maxime Bouet (FRA)	+ 14"
8	Juan José Oroz (ESP)	+ 14"
9	Valerio Agnoli (ITA)	+ 18"
