= Wang Ruidong =

Chinese cyclist

Personal information
- Born: 8 July 2000 (age 26)

Cycling career
- Sport: Cycling
- Discipline: Road
- Role: Rider

Professional teams
- 2021: CFC Continental Team
- 2024: Giant Cycling Team
- 2026-: Li-Ning Star

Wang Ruidong (Chinese: 王瑞东; born 8 July 2000) is a Chinese cyclist, who currently rides for UCI Continental team Li-Ning Star. He is expected to compete in the road race at the 2020 Summer Olympics.

== Major results ==
2020
National Road Championships

2nd Road race
4th Time trial

2023
1st Stage 3 Trans-Himalaya Cycling Race
National Road Championships

2nd Road race

2024
National Road Championships

2nd Road race
