= Xu Gang (cyclist) =

Chinese cyclist

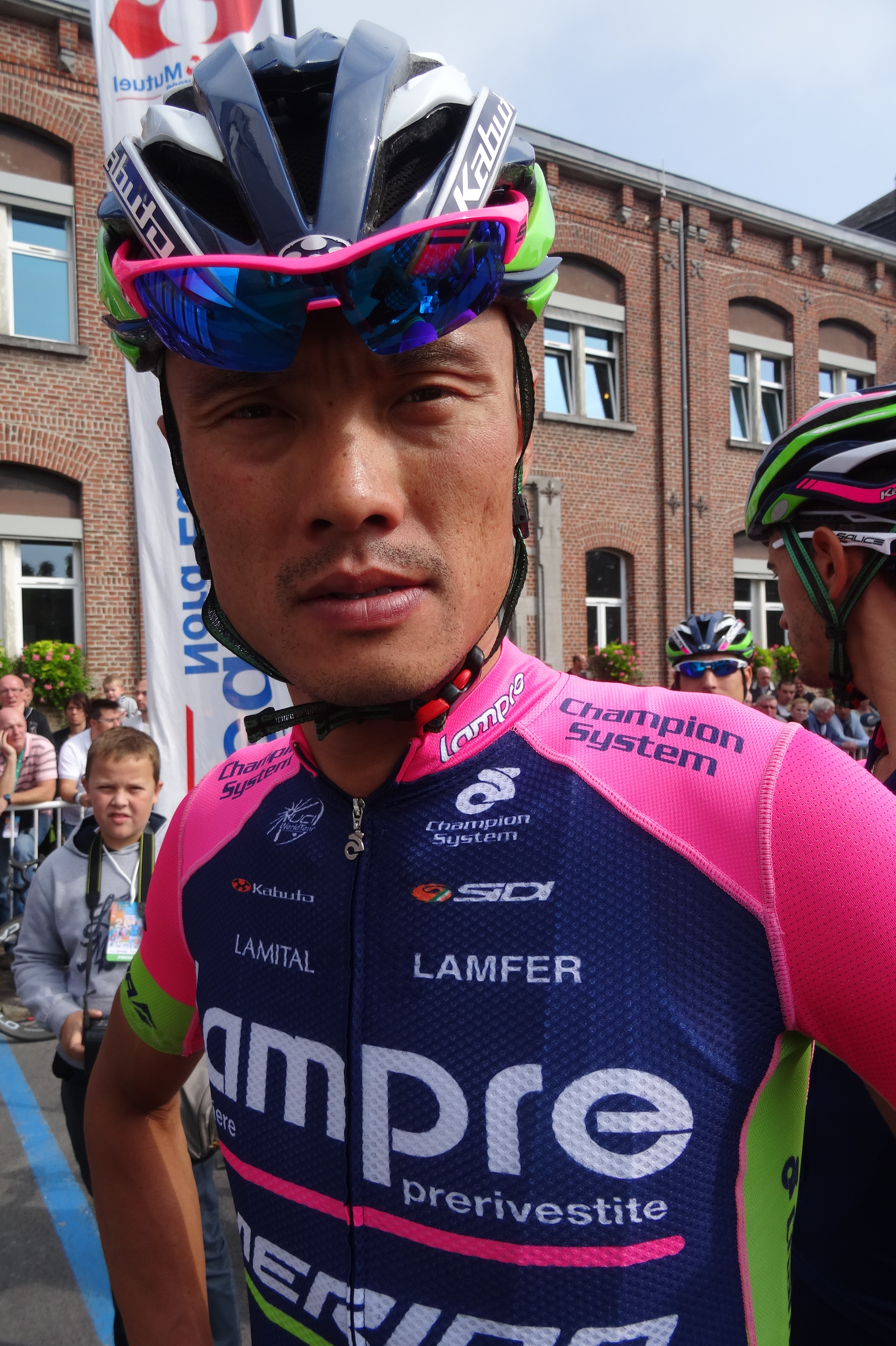
- Xu in 2014

Personal information
- Full name: Xu Gang
- Born: January 28, 1984 (age 42) China
- Height: 1.87 m (6 ft 2 in)
- Weight: 69 kg (152 lb)

Cycling career
- Sport: Cycling
- Current team: Retired
- Discipline: Road
- Role: Rider

Amateur team
- 2008: HSS Sports Institute

Professional teams
- 2005: Marco Polo
- 2006: Skil–Shimano
- 2007: Hong Kong Pro Cycling Team
- 2009–2011: Max Success Sports
- 2012–2013: Champion System
- 2014–2016: Lampre–Merida

Xu Gang (simplified Chinese: 徐刚; traditional Chinese: 徐剛; born January 28, 1984) is a Chinese former professional cyclist, who rode professionally between 2005 and 2016. He made his Grand Tour debut at the 2015 Giro d'Italia.

== Major results ==
2005
3rd Overall Tour of South China Sea
2007
1st Road race, National Road Championships
2008
1st Overall Tour of South China Sea
2009
1st Road race, National Road Championships
2011
1st Stage 3 Tour de Korea
2012
1st Road race, National Road Championships
