= Valerio Agnoli =

Italian road bicycle racer

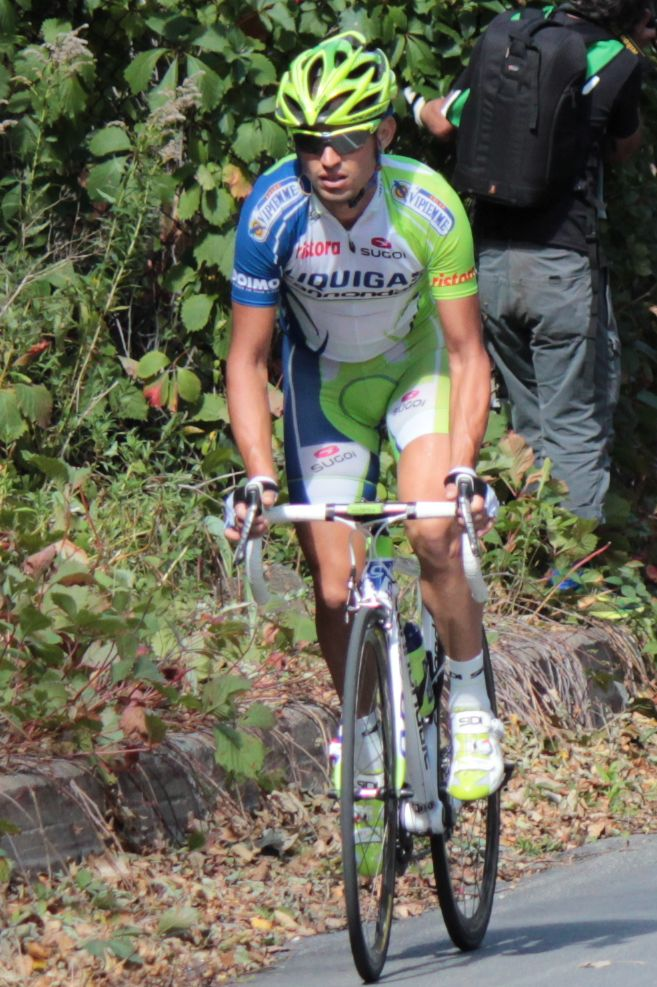
- Agnoli at the 2012 Grand Prix Cycliste de Montréal

Personal information
- Full name: Valerio Agnoli
- Born: 6 January 1985 (age 41) Alatri, Italy
- Height: 1.78 m (5 ft 10 in)
- Weight: 72 kg (159 lb; 11.3 st)

Cycling career
- Sport: Cycling
- Discipline: Road
- Role: Rider
- Rider type: Domestique

Professional teams
- 2004: → Domina Vacanze (stagiaire)
- 2005–2006: Naturino-Sapore di Mare
- 2007: Aurum Hotels
- 2008–2012: Liquigas
- 2013–2016: Astana
- 2017–2019: Bahrain–Merida

Major wins
- Grand Tours Giro d'Italia 1 TTT stage (2010) Vuelta a España 1 TTT stage (2008)

Valerio Agnoli (born 6 January 1985) is an Italian road bicycle racer, who last rode for UCI WorldTeam Bahrain–Merida.

== Career ==
Agnoli was one of the key domestiques for the Liquigas cycling team, where he was often instrumental in victories for Ivan Basso and Vincenzo Nibali during the Giro d'Italia. Agnoli had a very successful junior and amateur career, taking victories in many prestigious Italian races, including the famous Giro della Lunigiana.

Agnoli wore the white jersey for the best young rider during the 2010 Giro d'Italia, before a crash including his team-mates Ivan Basso and Vincenzo Nibali caused him to lose it.

Agnoli left Liquigas–Cannondale at the end of the 2012 season, to follow Nibali and join Astana on a two-year contract from the 2013 season onwards.

== Major results ==
2003
1st Overall Giro della Lunigiana
2004
9th Trofeo Internazionale Bastianelli
10th Giro della Romagna
2005
3rd Overall Tour of Qinghai Lake

1st Stage 8

2006
5th Overall Settimana Ciclistica Lombarda
7th GP Industria & Artigianato di Larciano
2008
1st Stage 1 (TTT) Vuelta a España
4th Japan Cup
2009
3rd Memorial Marco Pantani
7th Japan Cup
7th Giro del Veneto
2010
1st Stage 4 (TTT) Giro d'Italia
10th GP Miguel Induráin
2011
4th GP Industria & Artigianato di Larciano
2012
3rd Giro della Toscana
2014
7th Overall Vuelta a Burgos
8th Overall Danmark Rundt
2015
2nd Overall Tour de Langkawi
4th Clásica de Almería
9th Overall Settimana Internazionale di Coppi e Bartali
2016
1st Stage 1 (TTT) Giro del Trentino

=== Grand Tour general classification results timeline ===
Grand Tour	2008	2009	2010	2011	2012	2013	2014	2015	2016	2017	2018	2019
Giro d'Italia	—	61	32	83	57	39	71	—	DNF	110	—	93
Tour de France	Has not contested during career											
Vuelta a España	110	—	—	105	—	—	—	—	—	79	—	—

Legend
—	Did not compete
DNF	Did not finish
