= Wang Junyong =

Chinese cyclist (born 2000)

Personal information
- Full name: Wang Junyong
- Born: 11 April 2000 (age 26) Qingdao, Shandong, China

Cycling career
- Sport: Cycling
- Current team: FNIX–SCOM–Hengxiang Cycling Team
- Discipline: Road
- Role: Rider

Professional team
- 2019–: Hengxiang Cycling Team

Wang Junyong (Chinese: 王隽永; pinyin: Wáng Jùnyǒng; born 11 April 2000) is a Chinese cyclist, who currently rides for UCI Continental team FNIX–SCOM–Hengxiang Cycling Team.

== Major results ==
2019
1st Stage 3 Tour de Iskandar Johor
