= Luca Chirico =

Italian cyclist

Personal information
- Full name: Luca Chirico
- Born: 16 July 1992 (age 34) Varese, Italy
- Height: 1.67 m (5 ft 6 in)
- Weight: 53 kg (117 lb)

Cycling career
- Sport: Cycling
- Current team: Retired
- Discipline: Road
- Role: Rider

Amateur teams
- 2009: S.C. Caravatese Inda
- 2010: Brugherio Sportiva
- 2011–2013: U.C. Trevigiani–Dynamon–Bottoli

Professional teams
- 2014: MG Kvis–Trevigiani
- 2015–2016: Bardiani–CSF
- 2017: Torku Şekerspor
- 2018: Androni Giocattoli–Sidermec
- 2020–2022: Androni Giocattoli–Sidermec

Luca Chirico (born 16 July 1992) is an Italian former professional racing cyclist, who competed as a professional from 2014 to 2022.

== Major results ==
2009
8th Overall Vuelta al Besaya
2010
1st Overall 3Tre Bresciana
1st GP dell'Arno
1st Stage 2 Grand Prix Général Patton
5th Trofeo Città di Loano
2012
8th Gran Premio di Poggiana
2013
1st Gran Premio San Giuseppe
2nd Ruota d'Oro
4th Trofeo Alcide Degasperi
2014
2nd Circuito de Getxo
3rd Road race, National Under-23 Road Championships
3rd Giro del Belvedere
3rd Gran Premio di Poggiana
5th Tour de Berne
6th Coppa della Pace
7th Grand Prix Sarajevo
9th Giro di Toscana
10th Overall Tour de Serbie
2015
7th Overall Tour de Langkawi
2016
9th Overall Tour de Langkawi
2017
2nd Overall Tour de Serbie

1st Stage 2

2nd Overall Tour of Bihor
5th Overall Tour of Ankara
8th Overall Tour of Qinghai Lake
2021
6th Classic Grand Besançon Doubs
8th Giro dell'Appennino

=== Grand Tour general classification results timeline ===
Grand Tour	2015	2016	2017	2018	2019	2020
Giro d'Italia	88	—	—	—	—	85
Tour de France	Has not contested during his career					
Vuelta a España	Has not contested during his career					

Legend
—	Did not compete
DNF	Did not finish
