= George Harper (cyclist) =

English racing cyclist

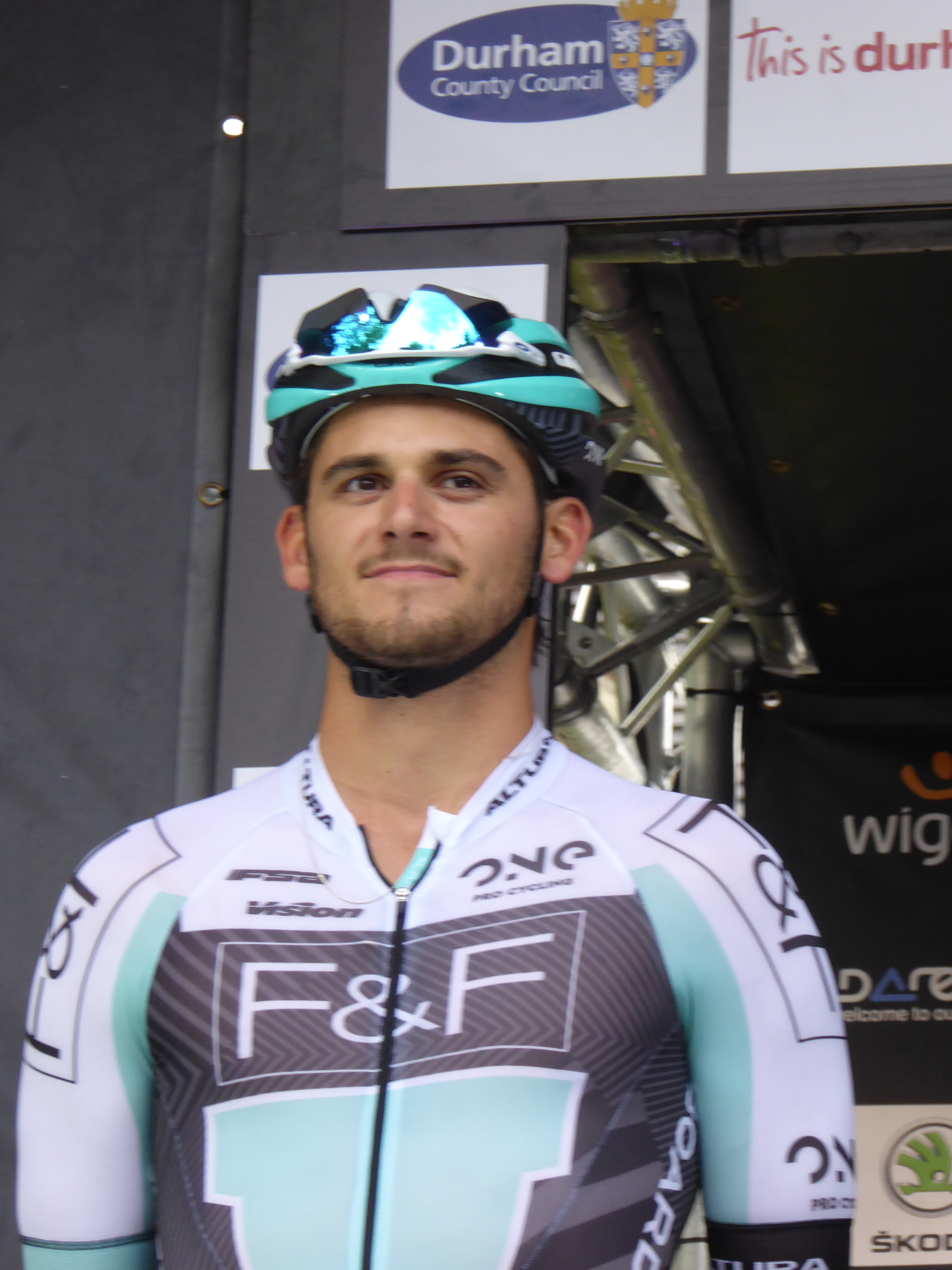
- Harper in 2017.

Personal information
- Born: 10 July 1992 (age 34) Basingstoke, England
- Height: 176 cm (5 ft 9 in)
- Weight: 67 kg (148 lb)

Cycling career
- Sport: Cycling
- Discipline: Road
- Role: Rider
- Rider type: All-rounder

Professional teams
- 2013: Team IG–Sigma Sport
- 2014: Velosure–Giordana
- 2015–2017: ONE Pro Cycling

George Harper (born 10 July 1992 in Basingstoke) is an English racing cyclist, who last rode for ONE Pro Cycling.

== Major results ==
2015
1st Severn Bridge Road Race
1st Tour series Hill climb
5th Tour series - Aberystwyth
4th Tour of Reservoir - Stage 1
2016
6th Overall Tour de Langkawi
