= Tang Xin (cyclist) =

Chinese cyclist (born 2001)

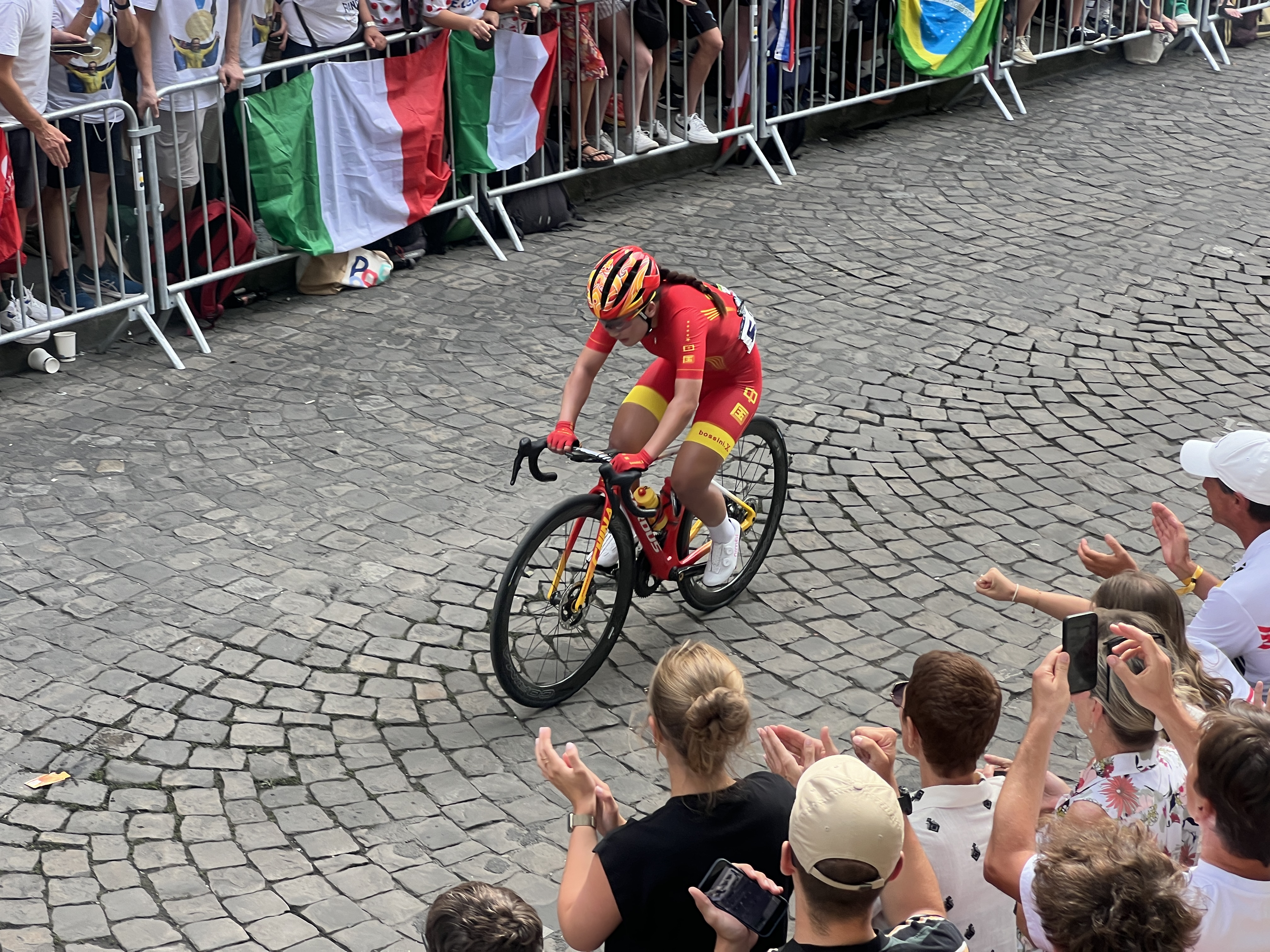
- Tang competing in the road race at the 2024 Summer Olympics

Personal information
- Born: 7 January 2001 (age 25)

Cycling career
- Sport: Cycling
- Current team: Mayenne Monbana My Pie
- Discipline: Road
- Role: Rider

Professional team
- 2024: Winspace
Medal record
Representing China
Women's road bicycle racing
Asian Championships
Bronze medal – third place	2024 Almaty	Road race

Tang Xin (Chinese: 唐欣; born 7 January 2001) is a Chinese road racing cyclist who currently competes for UCI Continental team Mayenne Monbana My Pie. Tang competed primarily at the national level from 2019 to 2023 with some success, including winning the Chinese National Road Championship road race in 2020. In 2024, Tang signed for UCI team Winspace. In her first season at the professional level, Tang became the first Chinese woman to finish the Paris–Roubaix Femmes and the first Chinese woman to participate in La Vuelta Femenina.

Tang was selected to represent China in both the time trial and road race at the 2024 Summer Olympics. She finished 32nd in the time trial, but failed to finish the road race.

== Major results ==
2020
1st Road race, National Road Championships
2023
National Road Championships

3rd Road race
3rd Time trial

8th Overall Tour of Chongming Island

1st Young rider classification

5th Tour of Guangxi
2024
3rd Road race, Asian Road Championships

=== General classification results timeline ===
Major Tour results timeline
Stage race	2024
La Vuelta Femenina	112
Giro d'Italia Women	–
Tour de France Femmes	–

=== Classics results timeline ===
Monument	2024
Paris–Roubaix Femmes	99

=== Major championship results timeline ===
Event		2020	2021	2022	2023	2024
Olympic Games	Time trial	Not held	–	Not held		32
Olympic Games	Road race	Not held	–	Not held		DNF
World Championships	Road race	–	–	–	DNF	DNF
World Championships	Time trial	–	–	–	–	52
World Championships	Mixed Relay Time trial	–	–	–	–	14
Asian Championships	Road race	–	–	–	42	3
National Championships	Road race	1	–	–	3	
National Championships	Time trial	–	–	–	3	
