= KSPO Professional =

South Korean cycling team

Team information
- UCI code: KSP
- Registered: Hanam-si, Korea Republic
- Founded: 1994
- Discipline: Road
- Status: UCI Continental Team

Key personnel
- General manager: Lee Byeong-Il
- Team manager: Kang San-deul

Team name history
- 1994–2016 2017–2019 2020–: KSPO Cycling Team (KSP); KSPO Bianchi Asia Pro Cycling (KSP); KSPO Professional (KSP)

KSPO Professional (UCI team code: KSP) is a Korean UCI Continental cycling team that was founded in 1994, that is sponsored by the Korea Sports Promotion Foundation.

== Team roster ==
As of 14 February 2021.

Rider	Date of birth
Choi Dong-hyuk (KOR)	15 January 1995 (age 31)
Hwang In-hyeok (KOR)	20 January 1988 (age 38)
Kim Jae-hyun (KOR)	16 October 2000 (age 25)
Kim Kook-hyun (KOR)	15 March 1999 (age 27)
Kwon Soon-yeong (KOR)	11 June 1993 (age 33)

Rider	Date of birth
Lee Dong-ha (KOR)	4 May 2001 (age 25)
Lee Tae-un (KOR)	4 July 1997 (age 29)
Park Kyoung-ho (KOR)	18 June 1993 (age 33)
Shin Gwang-ho (KOR)	2 January 2001 (age 25)
Yang Si-won (KOR)	28 May 2001 (age 25)

== Major wins ==
2011
Stage 2 Tour de Taiwan, Park Sung-baek
2012
Overall Tour de Korea, Park Sung-baek

Stage 2, Park Sung-baek

2013
Stage 2 Tour of Japan, Park Sung-baek
Stage 8 Tour de Korea, Seo Joon-yong
South Korea Road Race Championships, Jung Ji-Min
2014
Stage 8 Tour de Korea, Park Sung-baek
South Korea Road Race Championships, Seo Joon-yong
Stage 3 Tour de Hokkaido, Seo Joon-yong
2015
Stage 5 Tour de Langkawi, Seo Joon-yong
Stages 5 & 6 The Maha Chackri Sirindhon's Cup, Park Sung-baek
2018
Mountains classification Tour de Korea, Kwon Soon-Yeong
2019
Stage 3 Tour of China I, Park Kyoung-ho
