= Shiki Kuroeda =

Japanese cyclist

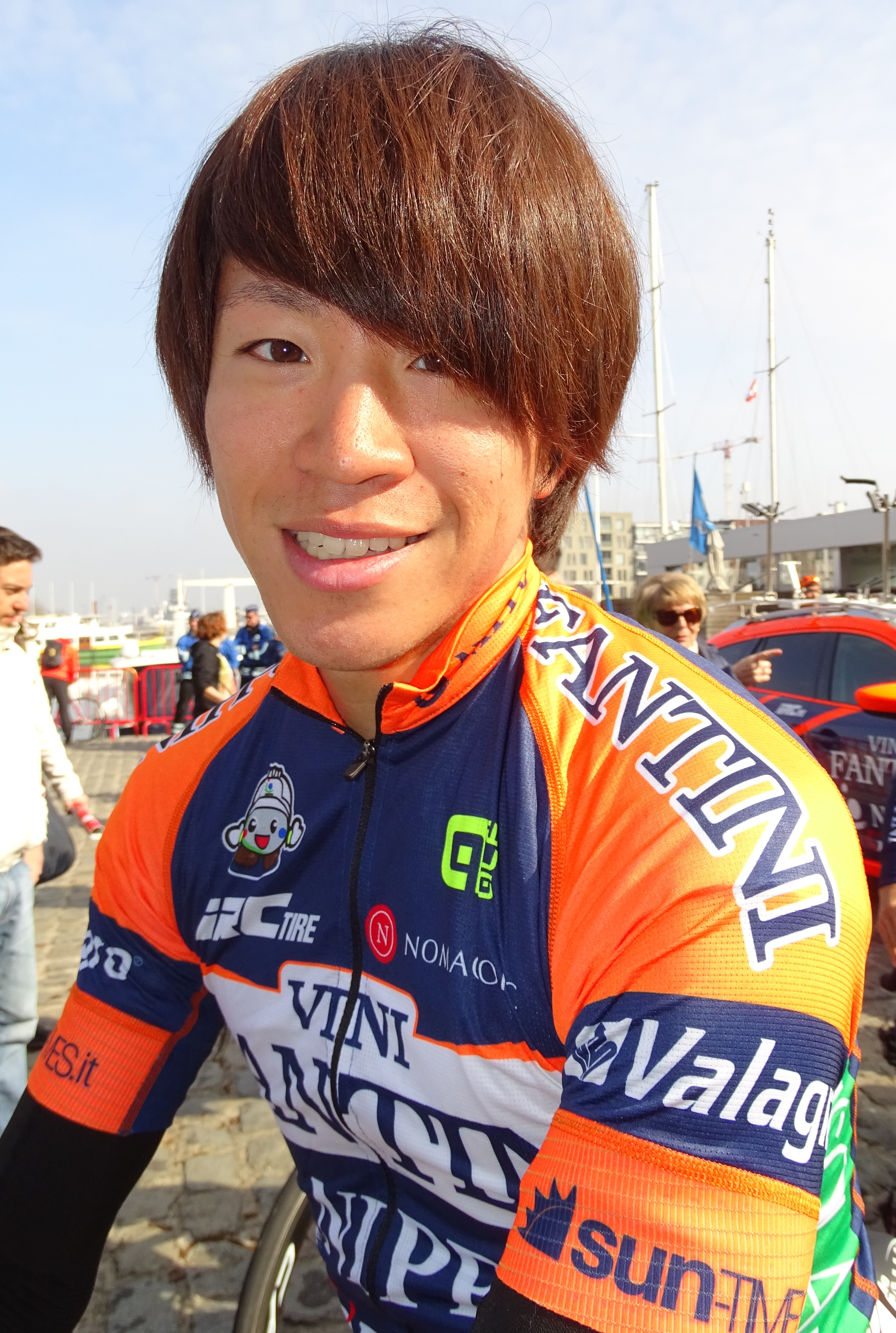
- Kuroeda at the 2015 Scheldeprijs.

Personal information
- Full name: Shiki Kuroeda; Japanese: 黒枝 士揮
- Born: 8 January 1992 (age 34) Ōita, Ōita Prefecture, Japan

Cycling career
- Sport: Cycling
- Current team: Sparkle Oita Racing Team
- Discipline: Road
- Role: Rider; Team manager
- Rider type: Sprinter

Amateur team
- 2021–2022: Sparkle Oita Racing Team

Professional teams
- 2014–2015: Vini Fantini–Nippo
- 2016–2018: Aisan Racing Team
- 2019–2020: Team Bridgestone Cycling
- 2023–: Sparkle Oita Racing Team

Managerial team
- 2021–2022: Sparkle Oita Racing Team

Shiki Kuroeda (黒枝 士揮, Kuroeda Shiki; born 8 January 1992) is a Japanese racing cyclist, who currently rides for UCI Continental team Sparkle Oita Racing Team.

== Career ==
He won the first stage of the Tour de Hokkaido in 2012 while still a student at the National Institute of Fitness and Sports in Kanoya. He joined Vini Fantini–Nippo starting with the 2014 season, and stayed on with the team as it became a Pro Continental team starting in the 2015 season.

== Major results ==
2009
1st Road race, National Junior Road Championships
2011
5th Overall Tour de Hokkaido
2012
1st Stage 1 Tour de Hokkaido
6th Tour de Okinawa
2013
5th Road race, Asian Under-23 Road Championships
2016
1st Points classification, Tour of Thailand
2018
1st Stage 3 Tour de Lombok
