= Wang Meiyin =

Chinese cyclist

Personal information
- Full name: Wang Meiyin
- Born: 26 December 1988 (age 37) China
- Height: 1.82 m (6 ft 0 in)
- Weight: 70 kg (154 lb)

Cycling career
- Sport: Cycling
- Current team: Retired
- Discipline: Road
- Role: Rider

Professional teams
- 2009–2010: Trek–Marco Polo
- 2011–2016: Hengxiang Cycling Team
- 2017–2019: Bahrain–Merida
- 2020–2022: Hengxiang Cycling Team

Wang Meiyin (Chinese: 王美银; born 26 December 1988) is a Chinese cyclist, who last rode for UCI Continental team FNIX–SCOM–Hengxiang Cycling Team.

== Major results ==
2010
8th Tour of South China Sea
9th Tour of Taihu Lake
2011
4th Overall Tour of Hainan
2012
1st Mountains classification, Tour of Hainan
National Road Championships

2nd Road race
3rd Time trial

2013
1st Mountains classification, Tour of China II
5th Overall Tour de Langkawi

1st Mountains classification
1st Stage 3

7th Overall Tour of China I
2014
5th Overall Tour of Taihu Lake

1st Chinese rider classification

6th Overall Tour of China II

1st Chinese rider classification

8th Overall Tour of Hainan
10th Tour of Yancheng Coastal Wetlands
2015
3rd Road race, National Road Championships
6th Overall Tour of China I

1st Stage 5

9th Overall Tour of Thailand
2016
1st Mountains classification, Tour de Langkawi
4th Overall Tour of China I
5th Overall Tour of Taihu Lake
5th Overall Tour of China II
2017
Asian Road Championships

4th Time trial
6th Road race

2018
Asian Road Championships

6th Road race
7th Time trial

2020
1st Road race, National Road Championships
