= Frédéric Brun (cyclist, born 1988) =

French cyclist

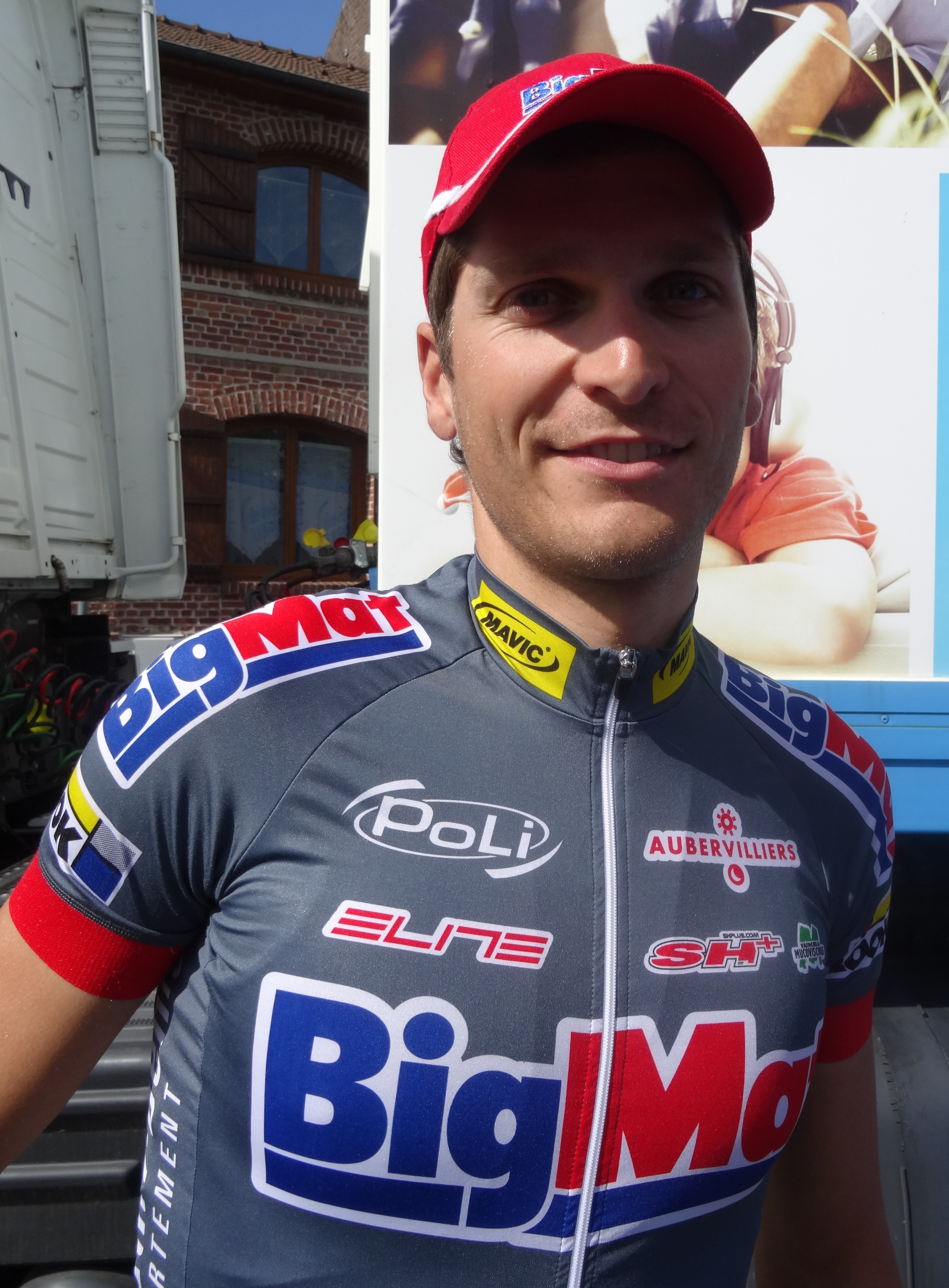
- Brun in 2014

Personal information
- Born: 18 August 1988 (age 38) Belfort, France
- Height: 1.89 m (6 ft 2 in)
- Weight: 73 kg (161 lb)

Cycling career
- Sport: Cycling
- Current team: Retired
- Discipline: Road
- Role: Rider

Amateur teams
- 2011: Charvieu-Chavagneux IC
- 2012–2013: Bourg-en-Bresse Ain
- 2013: Ag2r–La Mondiale (stagiaire)
- 2017: Bourg-en-Bresse Ain

Professional teams
- 2014: BigMat–Auber 93
- 2015–2016: Bretagne–Séché Environnement

Frédéric Brun (born 18 August 1988) is a French former professional racing cyclist, who rode professionally between 2014 and 2016 for BigMat–Auber 93 and Fortuneo–Vital Concept. He was named in the start list for the 2015 Tour de France.

== Major results ==
2008
9th Tour de Berne
2010
10th Overall Tour des Pays de Savoie
2013
1st Mountains classification Tour du Limousin
10th Paris–Troyes
2015
5th Overall Tour des Pays de Savoie
8th Polynormande
