= National Sport Council of Malaysia Cycling Team =

NSC Cycling Team
Team information
- UCI code: NSC
- Registered: Malaysia
- Founded: 2015
- Disbanded: 2016
- Discipline: Road
- Status: UCI Continental

Team name history
- 2015–2016: NSC Cycling Team

NSC Cycling Team is a former Malaysian UCI Continental cycling team established in 2015.
