= Seo Joon-yong =

South Korean cyclist

Personal information
- Full name: Seo Joon-yong; Korean: 서준용
- Born: March 14, 1988 (age 38) South Korea
- Height: 1.75 m (5 ft 9 in)
- Weight: 68 kg (150 lb)

Cycling career
- Sport: Cycling
- Discipline: Road
- Role: Rider
- Rider type: Sprinter

Professional teams
- 2009: EQA–Meitan Hompo–Graphite Design
- 2010–2012: Seoul Cycling Team
- 2013–2019: KSPO

- Seo Joon-yong
- Hangul: 서준용
- RR: Seo Junyong
- MR: Sŏ Chunyong
- IPA: [sʌ.dʑu.njoŋ] or [sʌ] [tɕu.njoŋ]

Seo Joon-yong (Korean: 서준용; born March 14, 1988) is a South Korean cyclist, who last rode for UCI Continental team KSPO Bianchi Asia.

== Major results ==
2008
1st Stage 7 Tour de Korea
2012
1st Stage 5 Tour of Thailand
2013
8th Overall Tour de Korea

1st Stage 8

2014
1st Road race, National Road Championships
6th Overall Tour de Hokkaido

1st Stage 3

2015
1st Stage 5 Tour de Langkawi
2017
1st Stage 5 Tour of Thailand
2018
1st Road race, National Road Championships
10th Road race, Asian Road Championships
