= Ryohei Komori =

Japanese bicycle racer

Personal information
- Born: 26 September 1988 (age 38) Fukuyama, Hiroshima, Japan

Cycling career
- Sport: Cycling
- Current team: Matrix Powertag
- Discipline: Road
- Role: Rider

Amateur teams
- 2007–2008: Daihatsu–Bonne Chance
- 2010: EQADS
- 2010: Vendée U
- 2013: Eurasia–IRC Tire

Professional teams
- 2008: Meitan Hompo–GDR (stagiaire)
- 2009: Trek–Livestrong
- 2011–2012: D'Angelo & Antenucci–Nippo
- 2014–2018: Aisan Racing Team
- 2019–: Matrix Powertag

Ryohei Komori (小森 亮 平, Komori Ryōhei; born 26 September 1988) is a Japanese cyclist, who currently rides for UCI Continental team Matrix Powertag.

== Major results ==
2008
1st Road race, National Under-23 Road Championships
2017
3rd Overall Tour de Selangor
8th Tour de Okinawa
10th Overall Tour of Thailand
2021
10th Oita Urban Classic
2022
7th Tour de Okinawa
