= NSC–Mycron =

Malaysian cycling team

Team information
- UCI code: NSC
- Registered: Malaysia
- Founded: 2015
- Discipline: Road
- Status: UCI Continental (2015– )

Team name history
- 2015 2016–: NSC Cycling Team; NSC–Mycron

NSC–Mycron is a Malaysian UCI Continental road cycling team founded in 2015.
