= Pegasus Continental Cycling Team =

Disbanded Indonesian UCI Continental Circuits cycling team

Team information
- UCI code: PCT
- Registered: Indonesia
- Founded: 2014
- Discipline: Road
- Status: UCI Continental

Team name history
- 2014–2017: Pegasus Continental Cycling Team

Pegasus Continental Cycling Team was an Indonesian UCI Continental cycling team established in 2014 and disbanded in 2017.

== Team roster ==
Rider	Date of birth
Dimas Febri (INA)	2 February 1996 (age 30)
Andriyan Hidayat (INA)	14 May 1998 (age 28)
Arin Iswana (INA)	7 May 1990 (age 36)
Asep Karyam (INA)	2 June 1995 (age 31)
Elan Riyadi (INA)	24 March 1989 (age 37)

Rider	Date of birth
Jeri Riyadi (INA)	19 June 1996 (age 30)
Teten Rohendi (INA)	2 April 1996 (age 30)
Andreas Setiawan (INA)	29 November 1996 (age 29)
Kevin Tutuarima (INA)	29 February 1996 (age 30)

== Major wins ==
2014
Stage 3 Le Tour de Filipinas, Rastra Patria Dinawan
Stage 2 Tour de Banyuwangi Ijen, Rastra Patria Dinawan
