= Michael Kolář =

Cyclist (born 1992)

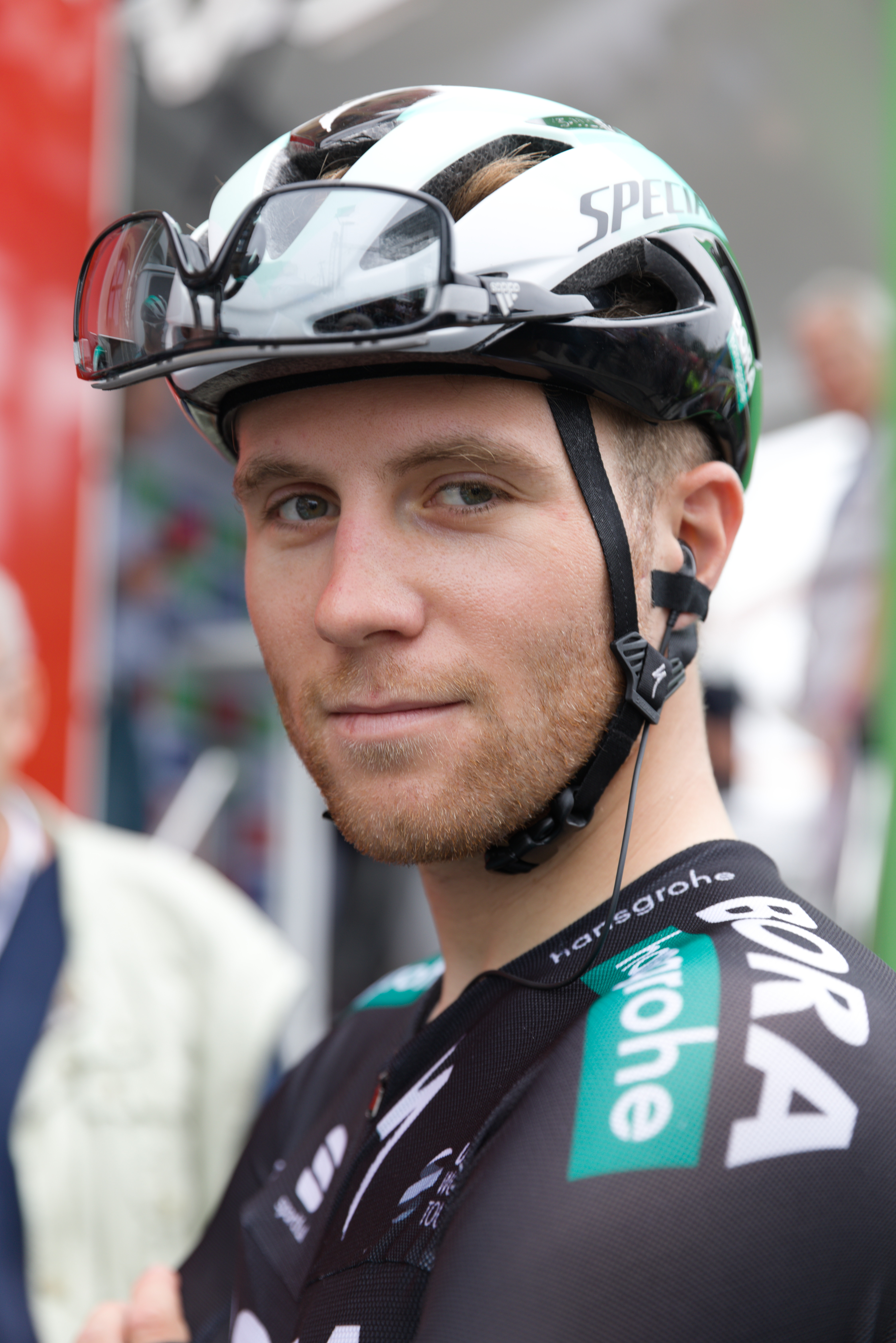
- Michael Kolář (2018)

Personal information
- Born: 21 December 1992 (age 33) Prague, Czechoslovakia

Cycling career
- Sport: Cycling
- Disciplines: Road (retired); Enduro mountain bike
- Role: Rider

Professional teams
- 2012–2013: Dukla Trenčín–Trek
- 2014–2016: Tinkoff–Saxo
- 2017–2018: Bora–Hansgrohe

Michael Kolář (born 21 December 1992) is an Enduro mountain bike racer. Kolář also competed as a road bicycle racer between 2012 and 2018 for the Dukla Trenčín–Trek, Tinkoff and Bora–Hansgrohe teams.

For the 2014 season, Kolář joined UCI World Tour team, Tinkoff–Saxo, from the Dukla Trenčín–Trek team. He participated to the three wins of the World Championship by Peter Sagan for Slovakia in 2015, 2016 and 2017. He was named in the startlist for the 2017 Vuelta a España.
