= Lukas Jaun =

Swiss cyclist (born 1991)

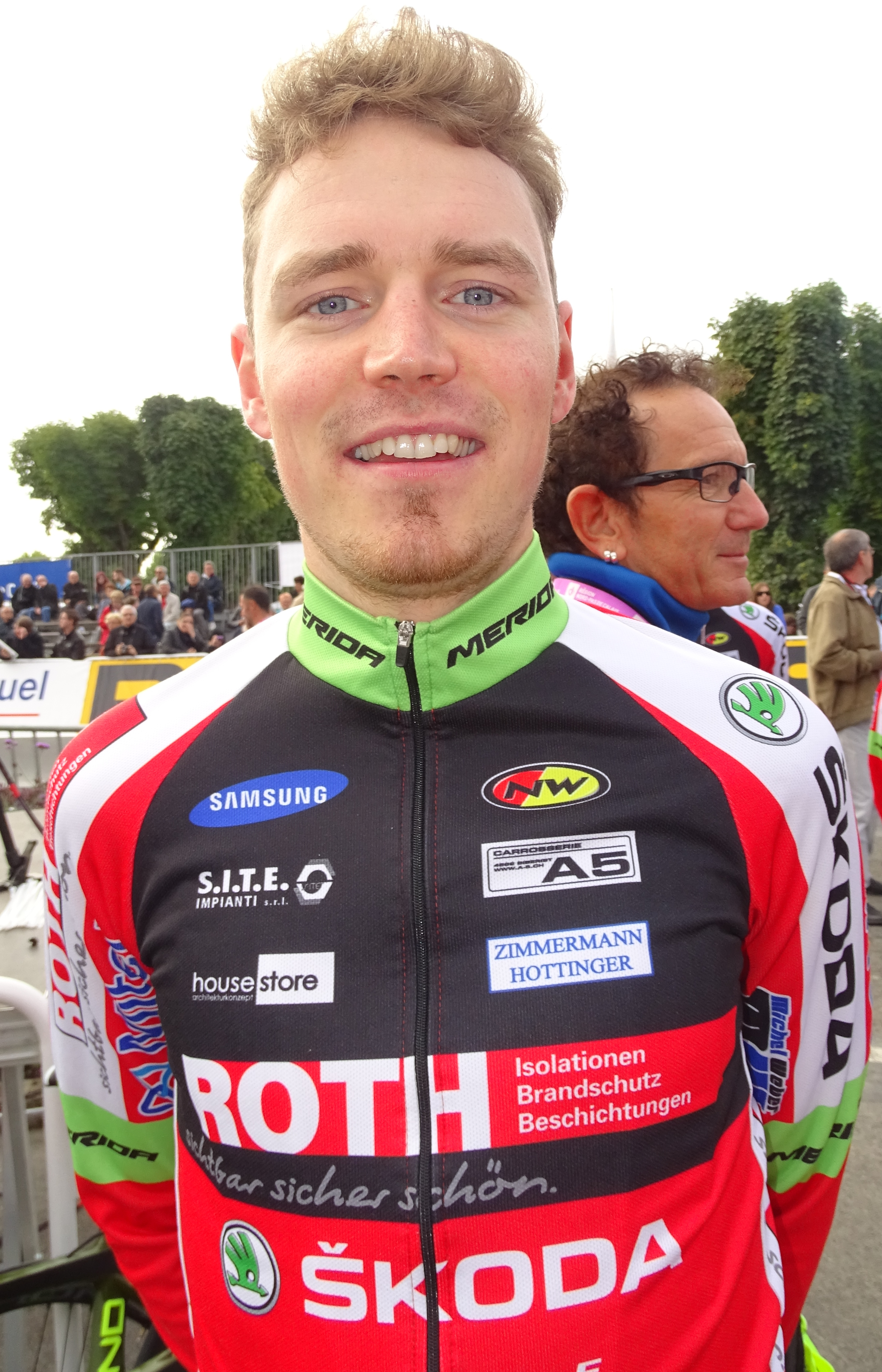
- Jaun in 2015

Personal information
- Born: 29 July 1991 (age 35) Biel/Bienne, Switzerland
- Height: 1.8 m (5 ft 11 in)
- Weight: 66 kg (146 lb)

Cycling career
- Sport: Cycling
- Current team: Retired
- Discipline: Road
- Role: Rider

Professional team
- 2015–2017: Roth–Škoda

Lukas Jaun (born 29 July 1991) is a Swiss former professional cyclist, who rode for Roth–Akros between 2015 and 2017. In 2015, Jaun finished eighth at the Grand Prix de la ville de Nogent-sur-Oise.
