= Patria Rastra =

Indonesian cyclist

Personal information
- Full name: Patria Rastra Dinawan
- Born: 26 November 1989 (age 36) Serang, Indonesia

Cycling career
- Sport: Cycling
- Current team: Retired
- Discipline: Road
- Role: Rider

Professional teams
- 2010: Polygon Sweet Nice
- 2014–2016: Pegasus Continental Cycling Team

Patria Rastra Dinawan (born 26 November 1989) is an Indonesian former professional cyclist.

== Major results ==
2008
3rd Road race, National Road Championships
2010
Tour de Indonesia

1st Stages 1 (TTT) & 7

5th Tour de Jakarta
2012
3rd Tour de Jakarta
2014
Tour de Ijen

1st Points classification
1st Stage 2

1st Stage 3 Tour de Filipinas
