= FNIX–SCOM–Hengxiang Cycling Team =

Chinese cycling team

Team information
- UCI code: FNX
- Registered: China
- Founded: 2011
- Discipline: Road
- Status: UCI Continental Team

Key personnel
- General manager: Wang Yue
- Team managers: Li Fuyu; Wu Zheliang

Team name history
- 2011–2015 2016 2017–2024 2025–: Hengxiang Cycling Team; Wisdom–Hengxiang Cycling Team; Hengxiang Cycling Team; FNIX–SCOM–Hengxiang Cycling Team

FNIX–SCOM–Hengxiang Cycling Team (UCI team code: FNX) is a Chinese UCI Continental cycling team, founded in 2011.

== Team roster ==
As of 17 January 2024.

Rider	Date of birth
Ethan Batt (NZL)	20 August 1998 (age 28)
Māris Bogdanovičs (LAT)	19 November 1991 (age 34)
Chen Jiwei (CHN)	6 March 2005 (age 21)
Chen Mingrun (CHN)	17 August 1996 (age 30)
Deng Zhiying (CHN)	17 August 2004 (age 22)
Dou Lixin (CHN)	20 January 2005 (age 21)

Rider	Date of birth
Gao Yongbing (CHN)	10 January 2002 (age 24)
Guo Xin (CHN)	9 March 2003 (age 23)
Song Chenggang (CHN)	6 August 2003 (age 23)
Sun Tao (CHN)	30 January 2002 (age 24)
Andris Vosekalns (LAT)	26 June 1992 (age 34)
Xu Changquan (CHN)	16 January 1997 (age 29)

== Major wins ==
2013
Stage 3 Tour de Langkawi, Wang Meiyin
2014
China National Road Race Championships, Jingbiao Zhao
2015
Stage 2 Tour of Thailand, Ma Guangtong
2016
Stage 3 Tour de Flores, Ronald Yeung
Stage 4 Tour de Flores, Jianpeng Liu
Prologue Tour of China II, Thomas Rabou
Stage 3 Tour of Fuzhou, Jingbiao Zhao
2018
Stage 1 Tour of Fuzhou, Lü Xianjing
2019
Stage 3 Tour de Iskandar Johor, Wang Junyong
Mountains classification Tour of China I, Zhang Zheng
Overall Tour of China II, Lü Xianjing
Stage 3 Tour of Quanzhou Bay, Lü Xianjing
Mountains classification Tour of Quanzhou Bay, Lü Xianjing
2020
China National Road Race Championships, Wang Meiyin
2023
China National Road Race Championships, Ma Binyan
