= Ma Guangtong =

Chinese bicycle racer

Personal information
- Full name: Ma Guangtong
- Born: 5 May 1995 (age 31)

Cycling career
- Sport: Cycling
- Current team: FNIX–SCOM–Hengxiang Cycling Team
- Discipline: Road
- Role: Rider

Professional team
- 2014–: Hengxiang Cycling Team

Ma Guangtong (born 5 May 1995) is a Chinese cyclist, who currently rides for UCI Continental team FNIX–SCOM–Hengxiang Cycling Team.

== Major results ==
2015
Tour of Thailand

1st Points classification
1st Stage 2

2nd Overall Tour of Yancheng Coastal Wetlands

1st Young rider classification

2016
1st Road race, National Road Championships
1st Points classification Tour de Ijen
1st Mountains classification Tour of Hainan
2017
2nd Overall Tour of Thailand
5th Road race, Asian Under-23 Road Championships
