= 2012 Tour de Langkawi, Stage 1 to Stage 10 =

Cycling race stages

The 2012 Tour de Langkawi was the 17th edition of the Tour de Langkawi, a cycling stage race that takes place in Malaysia. The race consisted of ten stages, starting in Putrajaya on 24 February briefly heading south along the west coast of the Peninsular Malaysia before returning north and crossing eastward to finish in Kuala Terengganu on 4 March.

The tour opened with an individual time trial (ITT), and again featured a stage finish at Genting Highlands. The final stage included five circuits around Kuala Terengganu. The seven other stages were flat or undulating.

== Stage 1 ==
24 February 2012 — Putrajaya, 20.3 km (12.6 mi), Individual time trial

Stage 1 Results and General Classification after Stage 1

	Rider	Team	Time
1	David Zabriskie (USA)	Garmin–Barracuda	24' 34"
2	Adam Phelan (AUS)	Drapac Cycling	+ 01' 00"
3	Darren Lapthorne (AUS)	Drapac Cycling	+ 01' 10"
4	Tom Danielson (USA)	Garmin–Barracuda	+ 01' 17"
5	José Rujano (VEN)	Androni Giocattoli–Venezuela	+ 01' 26"
6	Joseph Cooper (NZL)	New Zealand	+ 01' 31"
7	Dmitriy Gruzdev (KAZ)	Astana	+ 01' 33"
8	Alexsandr Dyachenko (KAZ)	Astana	+ 01' 38"
9	Nathan Haas (AUS)	Garmin–Barracuda	+ 01' 39"
10	Behnam Khalilikhosroshahi (IRI)	Tabriz Petrochemical Team	+ 01' 46"

== Stage 2 ==
25 February 2012 — Putrajaya to Melaka, 151 km (93.8 mi)

Stage 2 result

	Rider	Team	Time
1	Andrea Guardini (ITA)	Farnese Vini–Selle Italia	3h 35' 19"
2	Jake Keough (USA)	UnitedHealthcare	+ 0"
3	Christian Delle Stelle (ITA)	Colnago–CSF Bardiani	+ 0"
4	Anuar Manan (MAS)	Champion System	+ 0"
5	Raymond Kreder (NED)	Garmin–Barracuda	+ 0"
6	Jani Tewelde (ERI)	MTN–Qhubeka	+ 0"
7	Yohann Gène (FRA)	Team Europcar	+ 0"
8	Marco Canola (ITA)	Colnago–CSF Bardiani	+ 0"
9	Valentin Iglinsky (KAZ)	Astana	+ 0"
10	Zamri Salleh (MAS)	Terengganu Cycling Team	+ 0"

General Classification after Stage 2

	Rider	Team	Time
1	David Zabriskie (USA)	Garmin–Barracuda	03h 59' 53"
2	Adam Phelan (AUS)	Drapac Cycling	+ 01' 00"
3	Darren Lapthorne (AUS)	Drapac Cycling	+ 01' 10"
4	Tom Danielson (USA)	Garmin–Barracuda	+ 01' 17"
5	José Rujano (VEN)	Androni Giocattoli–Venezuela	+ 01' 26"
6	Joseph Cooper (NZL)	New Zealand	+ 01' 31"
7	Dmitriy Gruzdev (KAZ)	Astana	+ 01' 33"
8	Alexsandr Dyachenko (KAZ)	Astana	+ 01' 39"
9	Nathan Haas (AUS)	Garmin–Barracuda	+ 01' 39"
10	Behnam Khalilikhosroshahi (IRI)	Tabriz Petrochemical Team	+ 01' 46"

== Stage 3 ==
26 February 2012 — Melaka to Parit Sulong, 187.6 km (116.6 mi)

Stage 3 result

	Rider	Team	Time
1	Andrea Guardini (ITA)	Farnese Vini–Selle Italia	4h 30' 11"
2	Raymond Kreder (NED)	Garmin–Barracuda	+ 0"
3	Anuar Manan (MAS)	Champion System	+ 0"
4	Sonny Colbrelli (ITA)	Colnago–CSF Bardiani	+ 0"
5	Valentin Iglinsky (KAZ)	Astana	+ 0"
6	Jake Keough (USA)	UnitedHealthcare	+ 0"
7	Hossein Nateghi (IRI)	Tabriz Petrochemical Team	+ 0"
8	Roman Van Uden (NZL)	New Zealand	+ 0"
9	Ramin Maleki Mizan (IRI)	Tabriz Petrochemical Team	+ 0"
10	James Williamson (NZL)	New Zealand	+ 0"

General Classification after Stage 3

	Rider	Team	Time
1	David Zabriskie (USA)	Garmin–Barracuda	08h 30' 04"
2	Adam Phelan (AUS)	Drapac Cycling	+ 01' 00"
3	Darren Lapthorne (AUS)	Drapac Cycling	+ 01' 10"
4	Tom Danielson (USA)	Garmin–Barracuda	+ 01' 17"
5	José Rujano (VEN)	Androni Giocattoli–Venezuela	+ 01' 26"
6	Joseph Cooper (NZL)	New Zealand	+ 01' 31"
7	Dmitriy Gruzdev (KAZ)	Astana	+ 01' 33"
8	Alexsandr Dyachenko (KAZ)	Astana	+ 01' 39"
9	Behnam Khalilikhosroshahi (IRI)	Tabriz Petrochemical Team	+ 01' 46"
10	Floris Goesinnen (NED)	Drapac Cycling	+ 01' 50"

== Stage 4 ==
27 February 2012 — Batu Pahat to Muar, 169.4 km (105.3 mi)

There will be no climbs in the stage with only three intermediate sprints (64.1 km, 84.5 km and 115.5 km) for the day. Like in the previous stage, undulating terrain close to the second intermediate sprint zone, will allow attacks from breakaway riders. A gradual descent after the third intermediate sprint.

Stage 4 result

	Rider	Team	Time
1	Andrea Guardini (ITA)	Farnese Vini–Selle Italia	3h 57' 11"
2	Jake Keough (USA)	UnitedHealthcare	+ 0"
3	Harrif Salleh (MAS)	Terengganu Cycling Team	+ 0"
4	Yohann Gène (FRA)	Team Europcar	+ 0"
5	Valentin Iglinsky (KAZ)	Astana	+ 0"
6	Sonny Colbrelli (ITA)	Colnago–CSF Bardiani	+ 0"
7	Anuar Manan (MAS)	Champion System	+ 0"
8	Kévin Reza (FRA)	Team Europcar	+ 0"
9	Jani Tewelde (ERI)	MTN–Qhubeka	+ 0"
10	Hossein Nateghi (IRI)	Tabriz Petrochemical Team	+ 0"

General Classification after Stage 4

	Rider	Team	Time
1	David Zabriskie (USA)	Garmin–Barracuda	12h 27' 15"
2	Adam Phelan (AUS)	Drapac Cycling	+ 01' 00"
3	Darren Lapthorne (AUS)	Drapac Cycling	+ 01' 10"
4	Tom Danielson (USA)	Garmin–Barracuda	+ 01' 17"
5	José Rujano (VEN)	Androni Giocattoli–Venezuela	+ 01' 26"
6	Joseph Cooper (NZL)	New Zealand	+ 01' 31"
7	Dmitriy Gruzdev (KAZ)	Astana	+ 01' 33"
8	Alexsandr Dyachenko (KAZ)	Astana	+ 01' 39"
9	Behnam Khalilikhosroshahi (IRI)	Tabriz Petrochemical Team	+ 01' 46"
10	Floris Goesinnen (NED)	Drapac Cycling	+ 01' 50"

== Stage 5 ==
28 February 2012 — Ayer Keroh to Pandan Indah, 190 km (118.1 mi)

General classification leader David Zabriskie finished 19 minutes after stage winner José Serpa. His race director suspected fever, heat stroke, or dehydration caused Zabriskie to drop off the back.

Stage 5 result

	Rider	Team	Time
1	José Serpa (COL)	Androni Giocattoli–Venezuela	4h 32' 17"
2	Darren Lapthorne (AUS)	Drapac Cycling	+ 0"
3	Matteo Rabottini (ITA)	Farnese Vini–Selle Italia	+ 11"
4	Adiq Husainie Othman (MAS)	Champion System	+ 11"
5	Alexsandr Dyachenko (KAZ)	Astana	+ 11"
6	Víctor Niño (COL)	Azad University Cross Team	+ 11"
7	Ghader Mizbani (IRI)	Tabriz Petrochemical Team	+ 11"
8	Jani Tewelde (ERI)	MTN–Qhubeka	+ 24"
9	Valentin Iglinskiy (KAZ)	Astana	+ 24"
10	Taiji Nishitani (JPN)	Aisan Racing Team	+ 24"

General Classification after Stage 5

	Rider	Team	Time
1	Darren Lapthorne (AUS)	Drapac Cycling	17h 00' 36"
2	Tom Danielson (USA)	Garmin–Barracuda	+ 37"
3	Alexsandr Dyachenko (KAZ)	Astana	+ 46"
4	José Rujano (VEN)	Androni Giocattoli–Venezuela	+ 46"
5	Joseph Cooper (NZL)	New Zealand	+ 51"
6	Dmitriy Gruzdev (KAZ)	Astana	+ 53"
7	José Serpa (COL)	Androni Giocattoli–Venezuela	+ 01' 08"
8	Artem Ovechkin (RUS)	RusVelo	+ 01' 11"
9	Yohann Gène (FRA)	Team Europcar	+ 01' 12"
10	Alfredo Balloni (ITA)	Farnese Vini–Selle Italia	+ 01' 17"

== Stage 6 ==
29 February 2012 — Proton, Shah Alam to Genting Highlands, 108 km (67.1 mi)

The Queen stage of the Tour. There were three intermediate sprints in the first 60 km stretch, starting at the 35 km mark. The stage finished at the top of the Hors category climb up to Genting Highlands. In a similar fashion to David Zabriskie's trouble on Stage 5, overnight race leader Darren Lapthorne of Drapac Cycling lost the overall lead to José Serpa from Androni Giocattoli–Venezuela. Lapthorne was suffering from severe chest pains and was unable to match the pace of the leaders up the final climb, eventually finishing over 15 minutes behind Serpa.

Stage 6 result

	Rider	Team	Time
1	José Serpa (COL)	Androni Giocattoli–Venezuela	03h 09' 37"
2	Víctor Niño (COL)	Azad University Cross Team	+ 02"
3	José Rujano (VEN)	Androni Giocattoli–Venezuela	+ 46"
4	Alexsandr Dyachenko (KAZ)	Astana	+ 2' 32"
5	Jackson Rodríguez (VEN)	Androni Giocattoli–Venezuela	+ 2' 53"
6	Stefano Locatelli (ITA)	Colnago–CSF Bardiani	+ 2' 53"
7	Matteo Rabottini (ITA)	Farnese Vini–Selle Italia	+ 3' 25"
8	Chris Butler (USA)	Champion System	+ 3' 26"
9	Andrey Zeits (KAZ)	Astana	+ 3' 28"
10	Dennis Van Niekerk (RSA)	MTN–Qhubeka	+ 3' 35"

General Classification after Stage 6

	Rider	Team	Time
1	José Serpa (COL)	Androni Giocattoli–Venezuela	20h 11' 11"
2	José Rujano (VEN)	Androni Giocattoli–Venezuela	+ 30"
3	Víctor Niño (COL)	Azad University Cross Team	+ 56"
4	Alexsandr Dyachenko (KAZ)	Astana	+ 2' 20"
5	Jackson Rodríguez (VEN)	Androni Giocattoli–Venezuela	+ 3' 43"
6	Stefano Locatelli (ITA)	Colnago–CSF Bardiani	+ 4' 15"
7	Ghader Mizbani (COL)	Tabriz Petrochemical Team	+ 4' 23"
8	Andrey Zeits (KAZ)	Astana	+ 4' 28"
9	Dennis Van Niekerk (RSA)	MTN–Qhubeka	+ 4' 33"
10	Chris Butler (USA)	Champion System	+ 5' 09"

== Stage 7 ==
1 March 2012 — Bentong to Kuantan, 205.8 km (127.9 mi)

This stage is the longest stage of the Tour this year. Three intermediate sprints starting from Mentakab (57.7 km), Maran (117.3 km) and Gambang (164 km) while there is a Category Four climb at 95.5 km.

Stage 7 result

	Rider	Team	Time
1	Marco Canola (ITA)	Colnago–CSF Bardiani	4h 25' 17"
2	Seo Joon-Yong (KOR)	Seoul Cycling Team	+ 0"
3	Serguy Klimov (RUS)	RusVelo	+ 0"
4	Mathieu Claude (FRA)	Team Europcar	+ 0"
5	Floris Goesinnen (NED)	Drapac Cycling	+ 0"
6	Raymond Kreder (NED)	Garmin–Barracuda	+ 11"
7	Valentin Iglinskiy (KAZ)	Astana	+ 11"
8	Suhardi Hassan (MAS)	Malaysia	+ 11"
9	Yohann Gène (FRA)	Team Europcar	+ 11"
10	Kenichi Suzuki (JPN)	Aisan Racing Team	+ 13"

General Classification after Stage 7

	Rider	Team	Time
1	José Serpa (COL)	Androni Giocattoli–Venezuela	24h 38' 10"
2	José Rujano (VEN)	Androni Giocattoli–Venezuela	+ 30"
3	Víctor Niño (COL)	Azad University Cross Team	+ 56"
4	Alexsandr Dyachenko (KAZ)	Astana	+ 02' 20"
5	Jackson Rodríguez (VEN)	Androni Giocattoli–Venezuela	+ 03' 43"
6	Stefano Locatelli (ITA)	Colnago–CSF Bardiani	+ 04' 15"
7	Ghader Mizbani (COL)	Tabriz Petrochemical Team	+ 04' 23"
8	Andrey Zeits (KAZ)	Astana	+ 04' 28"
9	Dennis Van Niekerk (RSA)	MTN–Qhubeka	+ 04' 33"
10	Joseph Cooper (NZL)	New Zealand	+ 04' 44"

== Stage 8 ==
2 March 2012 — Pekan to Chukai, 100.8 km (62.6 mi)

Stage 8 result

	Rider	Team	Time
1	Andrea Guardini (ITA)	Farnese Vini–Selle Italia	2h 13' 27"
2	Harrif Salleh (MAS)	Terengganu Cycling Team	+ 0"
3	Jake Keough (USA)	UnitedHealthcare	+ 0"
4	Hossein Nateghi (IRI)	Tabriz Petrochemical Team	+ 0"
5	Matteo Pelucci (ITA)	Team Europcar	+ 0"
6	Taiji Nishitani (JPN)	Aisan Racing Team	+ 0"
7	Sonny Colbrelli (ITA)	Colnago–CSF Bardiani	+ 0"
8	Valentin Iglinsky (KAZ)	Astana	+ 0"
9	Jani Tewelde (ERI)	MTN–Qhubeka	+ 0"
10	Raymond Kreder (NED)	Garmin–Barracuda	+ 0"

General Classification after Stage 8

	Rider	Team	
1	José Serpa (COL)	Androni Giocattoli–Venezuela	26h 51' 37"
2	José Rujano (VEN)	Androni Giocattoli–Venezuela	+ 30"
3	Víctor Niño (COL)	Azad University Cross Team	+ 56"
4	Alexsandr Dyachenko (KAZ)	Astana	+ 02' 20"
5	Jackson Rodríguez (VEN)	Androni Giocattoli–Venezuela	+ 03' 43"
6	Stefano Locatelli (ITA)	Colnago–CSF Bardiani	+ 04' 15"
7	Ghader Mizbani (COL)	Tabriz Petrochemical Team	+ 04' 23"
8	Andrey Zeits (KAZ)	Astana	+ 04' 28"
9	Dennis Van Niekerk (RSA)	MTN–Qhubeka	+ 04' 33"
10	Joseph Cooper (NZL)	New Zealand	+ 04' 44"

== Stage 9 ==
3 March 2012 — Kemasik to Kuala Terengganu, 165.7 km (103.0 mi)

Andrea Guardini won his fifth stage of the 2012 Tour de Langkawi. He is the first cyclist to record ten stage victories in the history of the Tour de Langkawi. The previous record of nine victories was established in 2005 by Graeme Brown riding for the Ceramica Panaria–Navigare cycling team, now known as Colnago–CSF Bardiani.

Stage 9 result

	Rider	Team	Time
1	Andrea Guardini (ITA)	Farnese Vini–Selle Italia	3h 27' 06"
2	Matteo Pelucci (ITA)	Team Europcar	+ 0"
3	Raymond Kreder (NED)	Garmin–Barracuda	+ 0"
4	Jake Keough (USA)	UnitedHealthcare	+ 0"
5	Sonny Colbrelli (ITA)	Colnago–CSF Bardiani	+ 0"
6	Valentin Iglinsky (KAZ)	Astana	+ 0"
7	Jani Tewelde (ERI)	MTN–Qhubeka	+ 0"
8	Zamri Salleh (MAS)	Terengganu Cycling Team	+ 0"
9	Thomas Bertonlini (ITA)	Farnese Vini–Selle Italia	+ 0"
10	Harrif Salleh (MAS)	Terengganu Cycling Team	+ 0"

General Classification after Stage 9

	Rider	Team	Time
1	José Serpa (COL)	Androni Giocattoli–Venezuela	30h 18' 43"
2	José Rujano (VEN)	Androni Giocattoli–Venezuela	+ 30"
3	Víctor Niño (COL)	Azad University Cross Team	+ 56"
4	Alexsandr Dyachenko (KAZ)	Astana	+ 02' 20"
5	Jackson Rodríguez (VEN)	Androni Giocattoli–Venezuela	+ 03' 43"
6	Stefano Locatelli (ITA)	Colnago–CSF Bardiani	+ 04' 15"
7	Ghader Mizbani (COL)	Tabriz Petrochemical Team	+ 04' 23"
8	Andrey Zeits (KAZ)	Astana	+ 04' 28"
9	Dennis Van Niekerk (RSA)	MTN–Qhubeka	+ 04' 33"
10	Joseph Cooper (NZL)	New Zealand	+ 04' 44"

== Stage 10 ==
4 March 2012 — Kenyir Lake to Kuala Terengganu, 116.9 km (72.6 mi), Criterium

Stage 10 result

	Rider	Team	Time
1	Andrea Guardini (ITA)	Farnese Vini–Selle Italia	2h 36' 42"
2	Jake Keough (USA)	UnitedHealthcare	+ 0"
3	Sonny Colbrelli (ITA)	Colnago–CSF Bardiani	+ 0"
4	Harrif Salleh (MAS)	Terengganu Cycling Team	+ 0"
5	Raymond Kreder (NED)	Garmin–Barracuda	+ 0"
6	Christian Delle Stelle (ITA)	Colnago–CSF Bardiani	+ 0"
7	Hossei Nateghi (IRI)	Tabriz Petrochemical Team	+ 0"
8	Robert Forster (GER)	UnitedHealthcare	+ 03"
9	Matteo Pelucchi (ITA)	Team Europcar	+ 03"
10	Valentin Iglinsky (KAZ)	Astana	+ 03"

General Classification after Stage 10

	Rider	Team	Time
1	José Serpa (COL)	Androni Giocattoli–Venezuela	32h 55' 31"
2	José Rujano (VEN)	Androni Giocattoli–Venezuela	+ 30"
3	Víctor Niño (COL)	Azad University Cross Team	+ 01' 03"
4	Alexsandr Dyachenko (KAZ)	Astana	+ 02' 20"
5	Jackson Rodríguez (VEN)	Androni Giocattoli–Venezuela	+ 03' 50"
6	Stefano Locatelli (ITA)	Colnago–CSF Bardiani	+ 04' 15"
7	Ghader Mizbani (COL)	Tabriz Petrochemical Team	+ 04' 23"
8	Andrey Zeits (KAZ)	Astana	+ 04' 28"
9	Dennis Van Niekerk (RSA)	MTN–Qhubeka	+ 04' 33"
10	Joseph Cooper (NZL)	New Zealand	+ 04' 44"
