= 2014 Bardiani–CSF season =

2014 Bardiani–CSF season
Manager	Roberto Reverberi
One-day victories	3
Stage race overall victories	–
Stage race stage victories	9
Previous season • Next season

The 2014 season for the Bardiani–CSF cycling team began in February at the Gran Premio della Costa Etruschi. Bardiani–CSF is an Italian-registered UCI Professional Continental cycling team that participated in road bicycle racing events on the UCI Continental Circuits and when selected as a wildcard to UCI ProTour events.

== 2014 roster ==
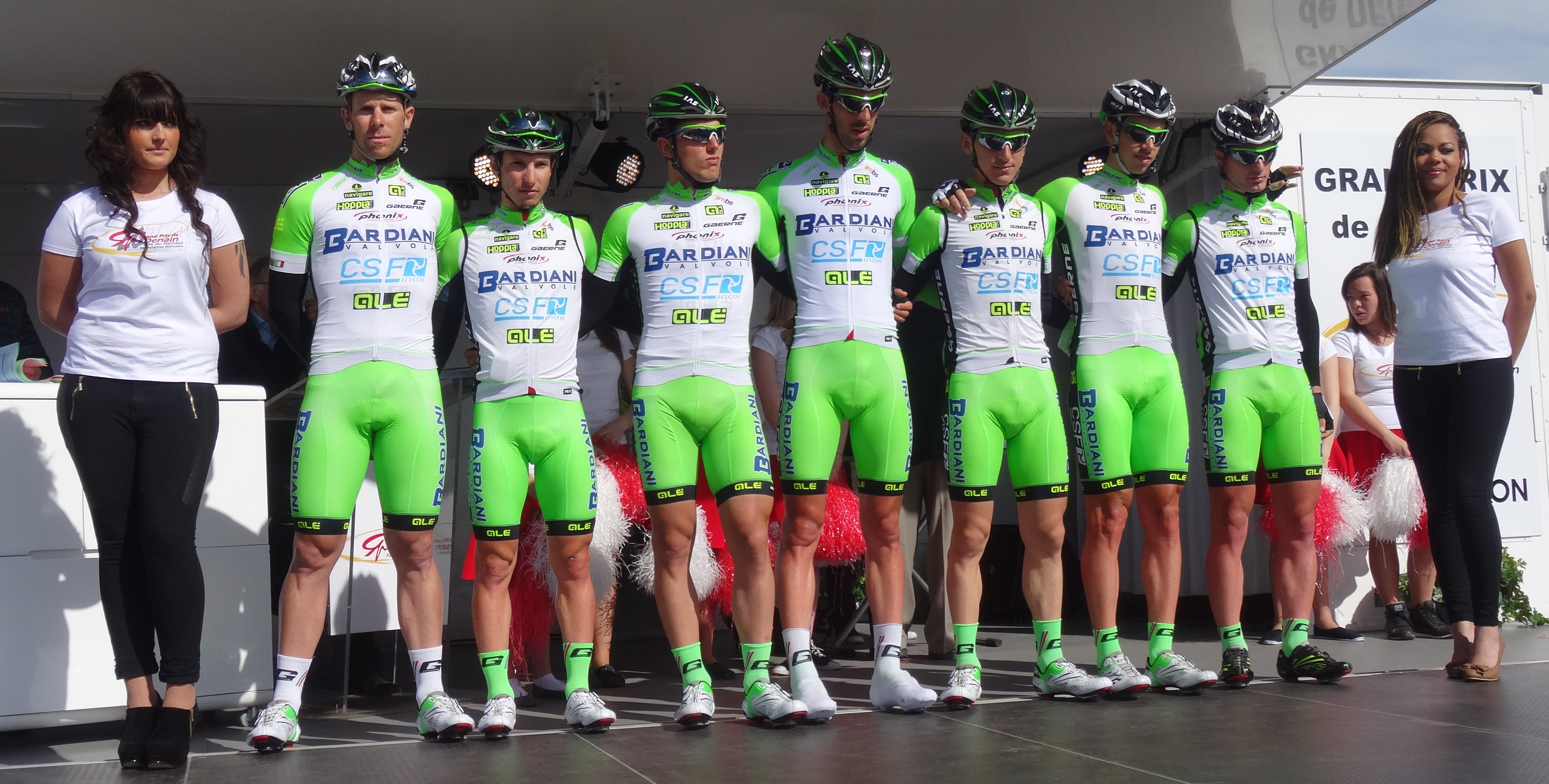
Grand Prix de Denain 2014.

As of 10 January 2014.

Rider	Date of birth
Enrico Barbin (ITA)	4 March 1990 (aged 23)
Enrico Battaglin (ITA)	17 November 1989 (aged 24)
Nicola Boem (ITA)	27 September 1989 (aged 24)
Francesco Manuel Bongiorno (ITA)	1 September 1990 (aged 23)
Marco Canola (ITA)	26 December 1988 (aged 25)
Sonny Colbrelli (ITA)	17 May 1990 (aged 23)
Marco Coledan (ITA)	22 August 1988 (aged 25)
Paolo Colonna (ITA)	24 March 1987 (aged 26)
Donato De Ieso (ITA)	27 February 1989 (aged 24)

Rider	Date of birth
Filippo Fortin (ITA)	1 February 1989 (aged 24)
Stefano Locatelli (ITA)	26 February 1989 (aged 24)
Andrea Manfredi (ITA)	10 February 1992 (aged 21)
Angelo Pagani (ITA)	4 August 1988 (aged 25)
Andrea Piechele (ITA)	29 June 1987 (aged 26)
Stefano Pirazzi (ITA)	11 March 1987 (aged 26)
Nicola Ruffoni (ITA)	14 December 1990 (aged 23)
Edoardo Zardini (ITA)	2 November 1989 (aged 24)

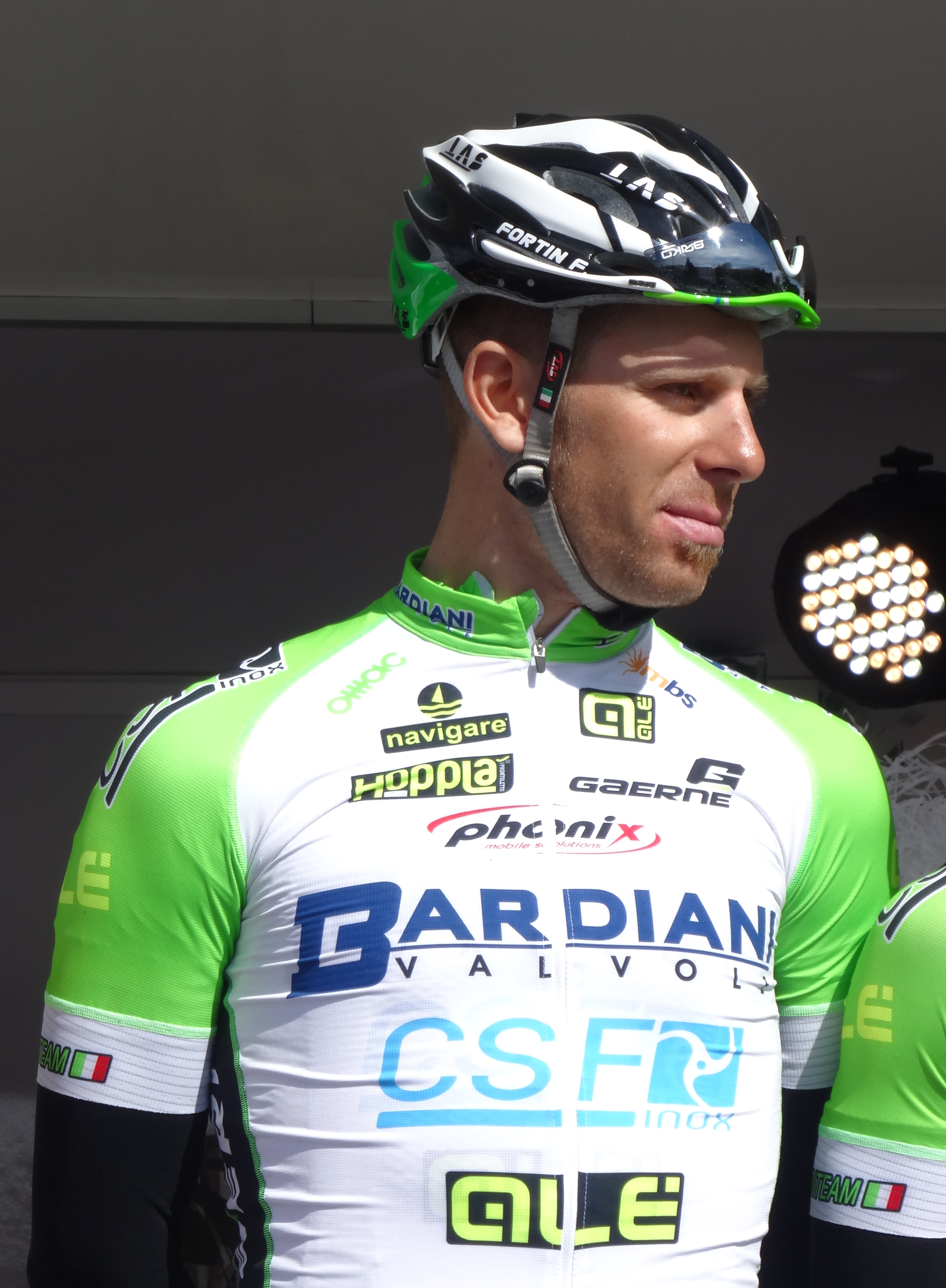
Filippo Fortin.

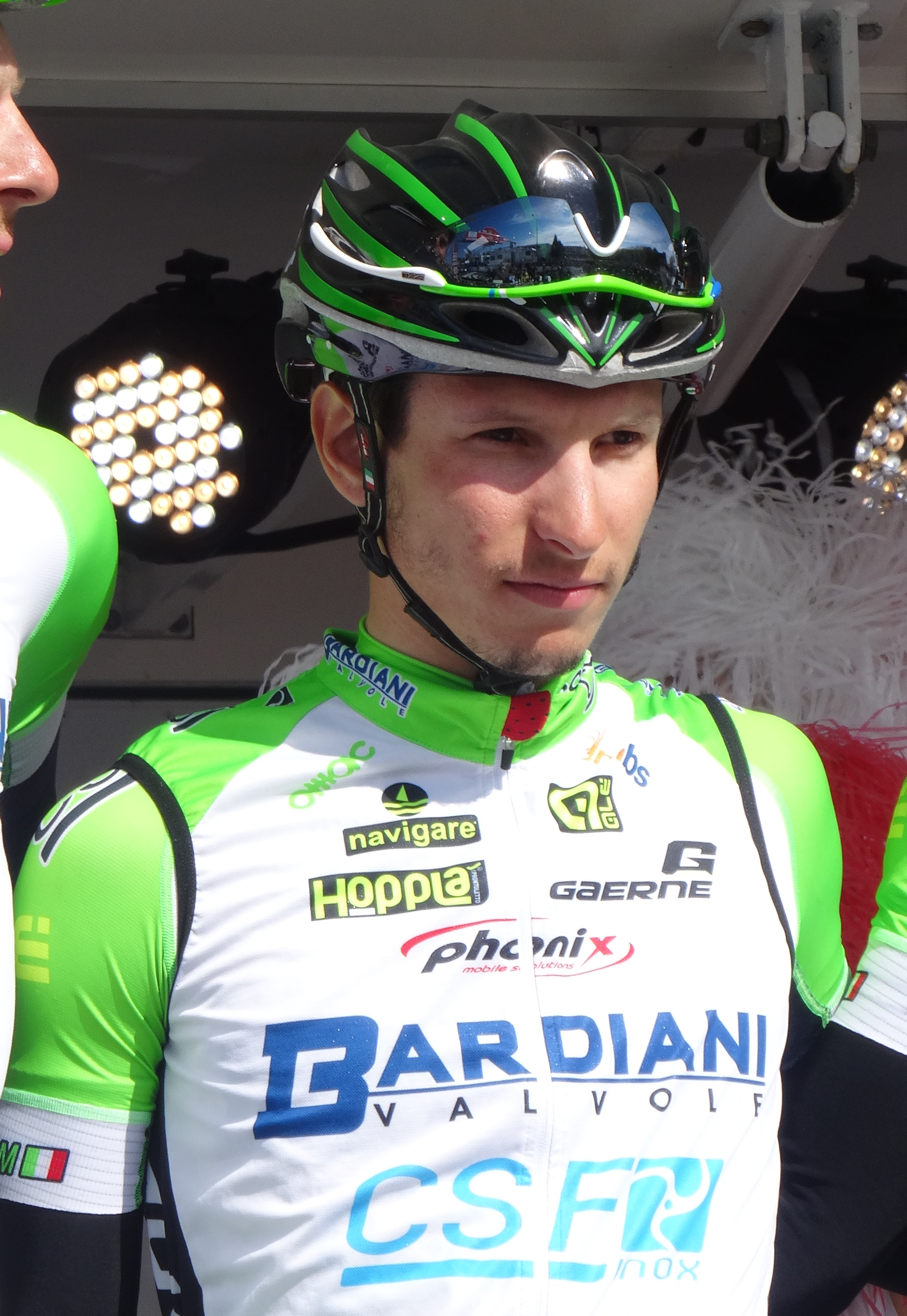
Marco Canola.

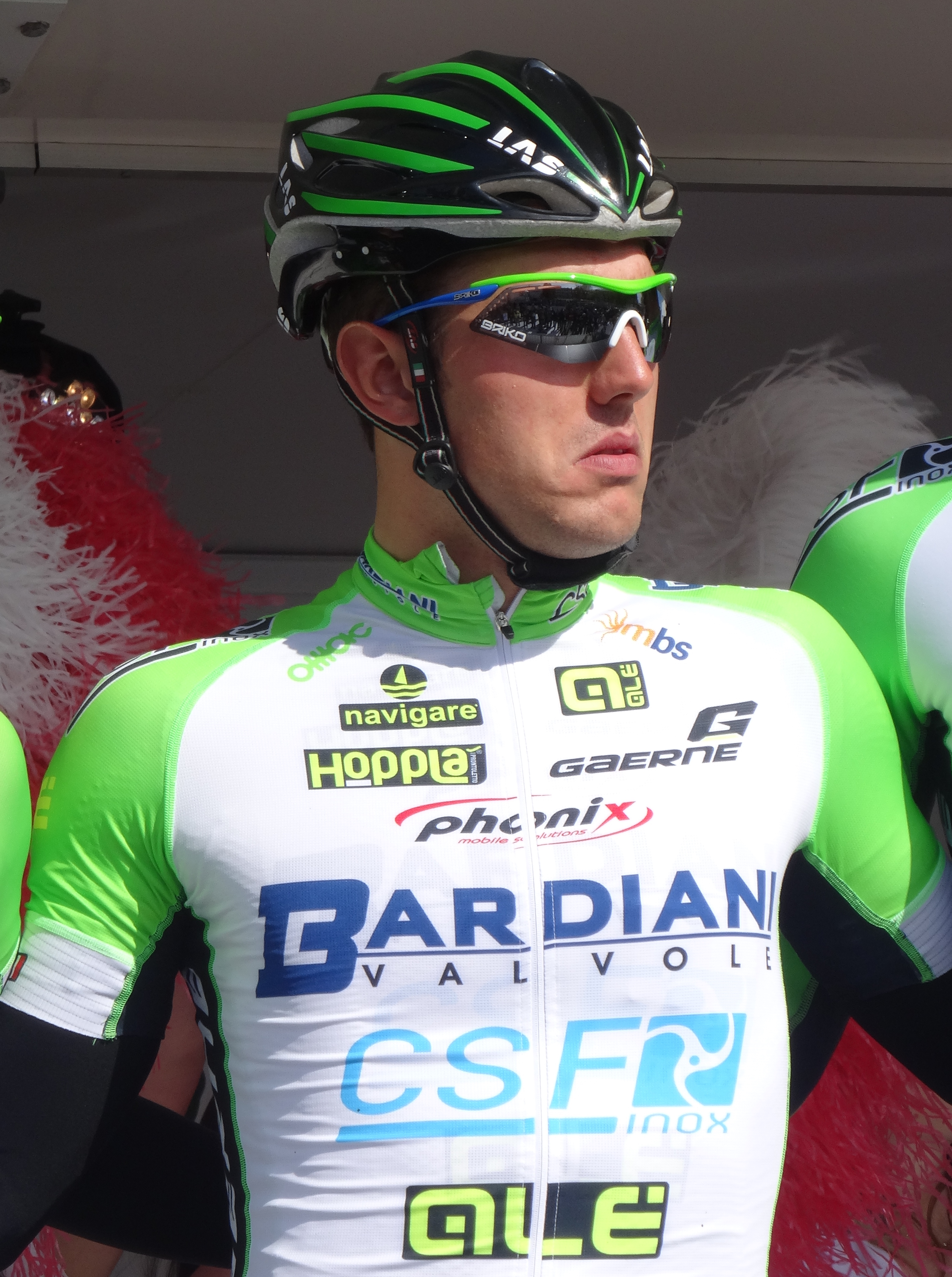
Sonny Colbrelli.

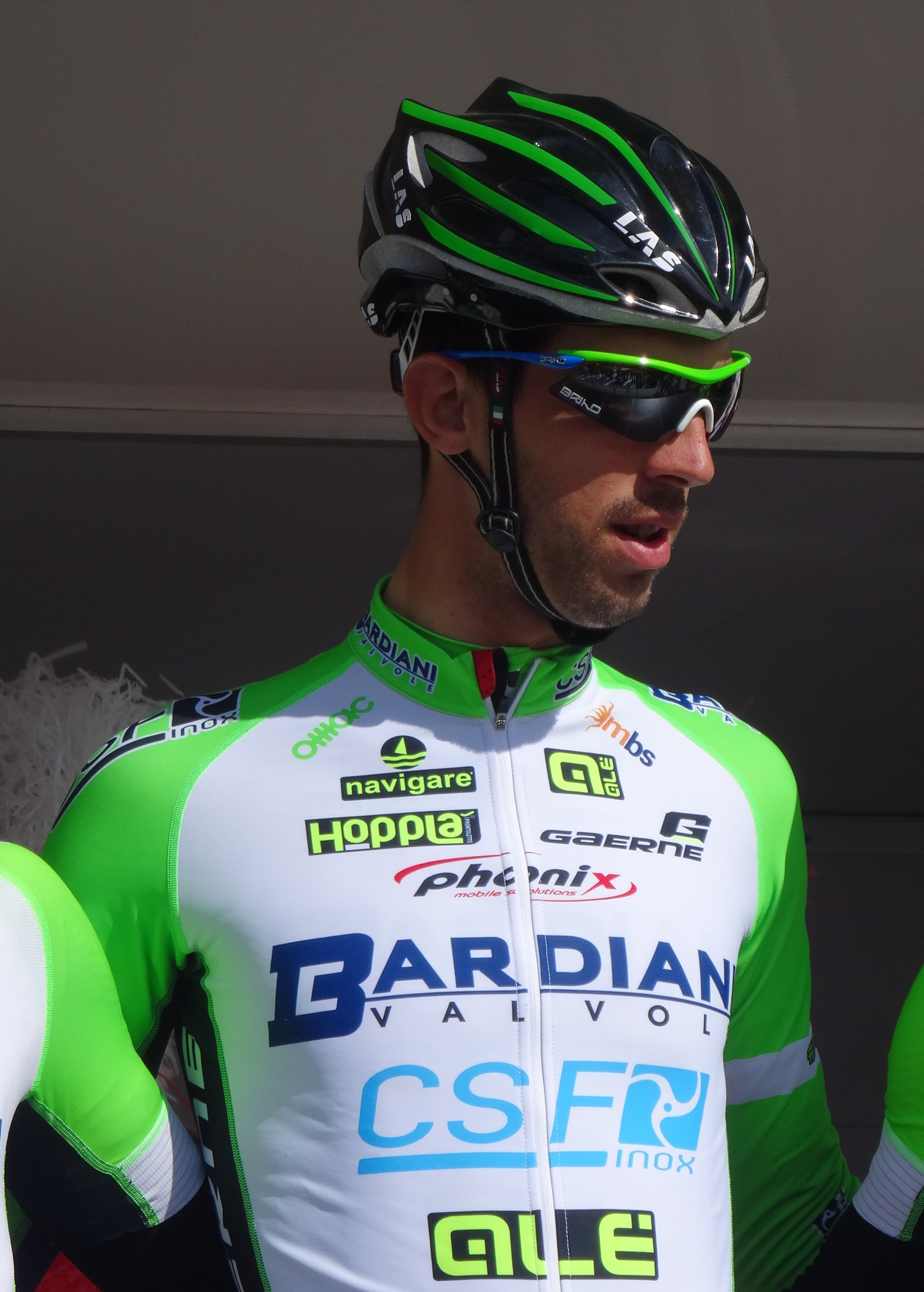
Nicola Boem.

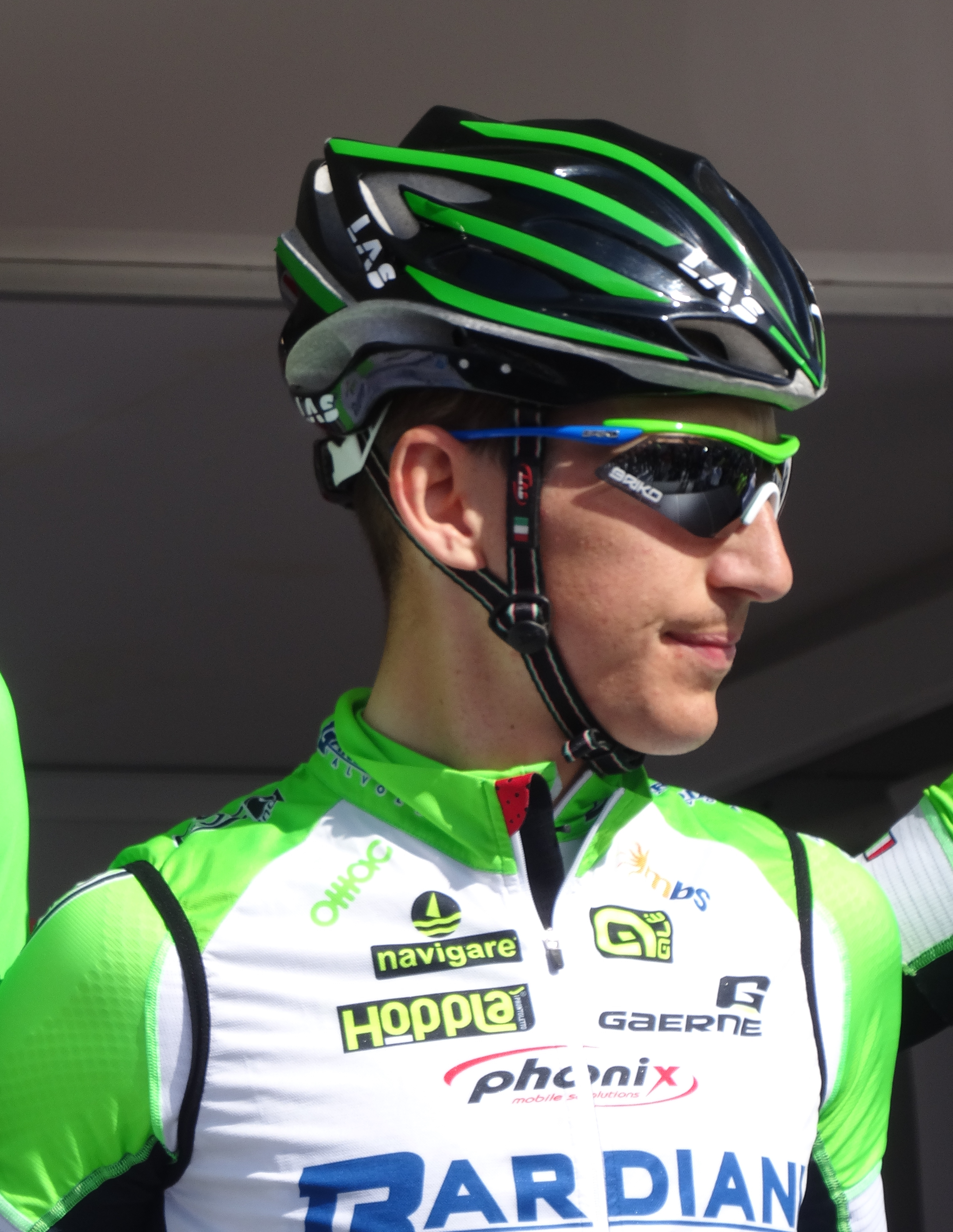
Enrico Barbin.

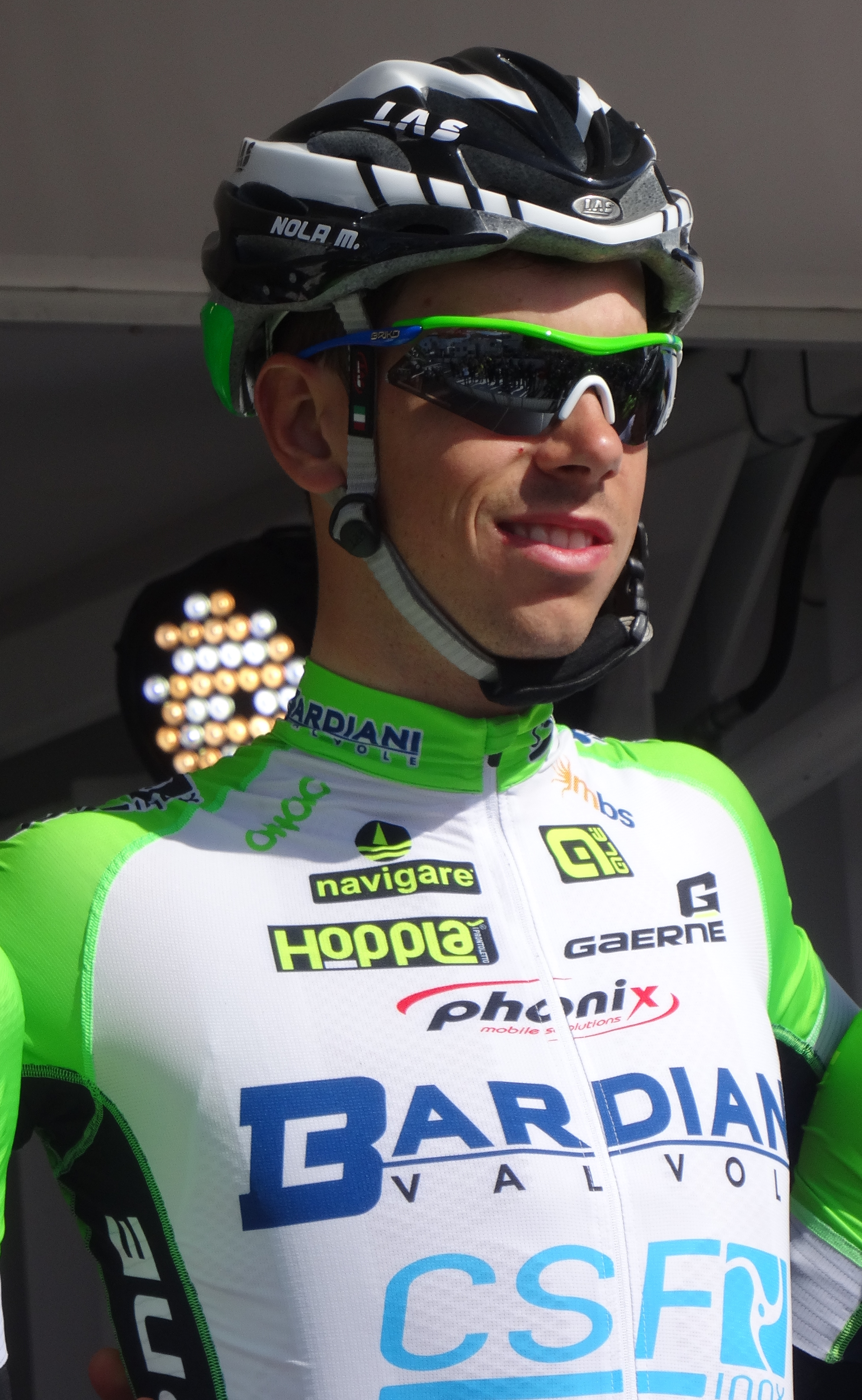
Angelo Pagani.

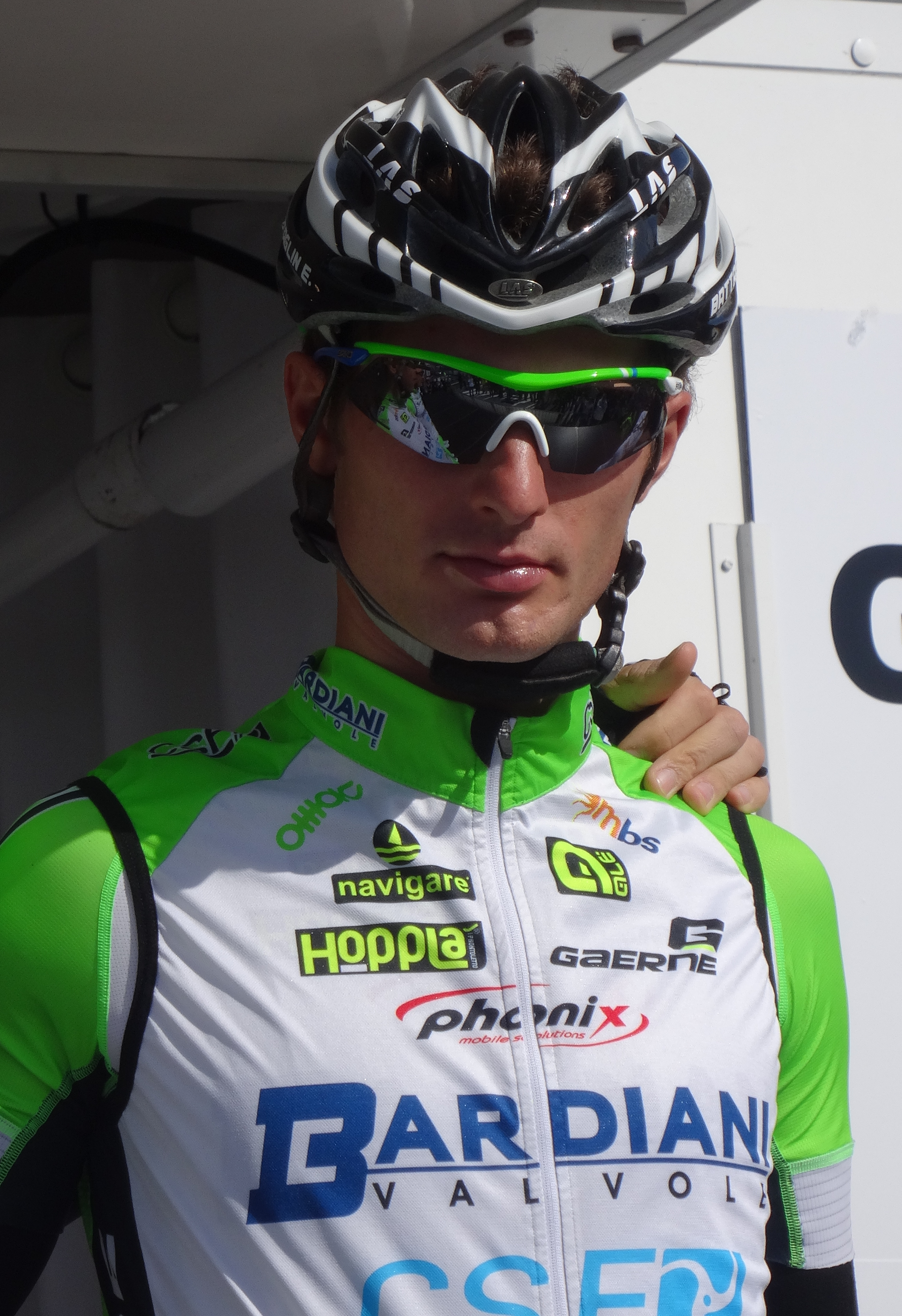
Enrico Battaglin.

Riders who joined the team for the 2014 season

Rider	2013 team
Paolo Colonna	neo-pro (Team Colpack)
Andrea Manfredi	neo-pro (Ceramica Flaminia–Fondriest)
Andrea Piechele	ex-pro (Ceramica Flaminia–Fondriest, 2013)
Nicola Ruffoni	neo-pro (Team Colpack)

Riders who left the team during or after the 2013 season

Rider	2014 team
Christian Delle Stelle	Team Idea
Andrea Di Corrado	Colpack
Sacha Modolo	Lampre–Merida
Andrea Pasqualon	Area Zero Pro Team

== Season victories ==
Date	Race	Competition	Rider	Country	Location
18 March	Tirreno–Adriatico, Mountains classification	UCI World Tour	Marco Canola (ITA)	Italy	
23 April	Giro del Trentino, Stage 2	UCI Europe Tour	Edoardo Zardini (ITA)	Italy	Brentonico
23 May	Giro d'Italia, Stage 13	UCI World Tour	Marco Canola (ITA)	Italy	Rivarolo Canavese
24 May	Giro d'Italia, Stage 14	UCI World Tour	Enrico Battaglin (ITA)	Italy	Oropa
28 May	Giro d'Italia, Stage 17	UCI World Tour	Stefano Pirazzi (ITA)	Italy	Vittorio Veneto
1 June	Giro d'Italia, Energy Prize classification	UCI World Tour	Enrico Battaglin (ITA)	Italy	
20 June	Tour of Slovenia, Stage 2	UCI Europe Tour	Sonny Colbrelli (ITA)	Slovenia	Kočevje
21 June	Tour of Slovenia, Stage 3	UCI Europe Tour	Francesco Manuel Bongiorno (ITA)	Slovenia	Trije Kralji
22 June	Tour of Slovenia, Teams classification	UCI Europe Tour	(Note: The riders on the squad were Enrico Battaglin, Stefano Pirazzi, Sonny Colbrelli, Edoardo Zardini, Angelo Pagani, Enrico Barbin, Francesco Manuel Bongiorno and Andrea Manfredi.)	Slovenia	
24 June	Giro dell'Appennino	UCI Europe Tour	Sonny Colbrelli (ITA)	Italy	Genova
10 August	Danmark Rundt, Stage 6	UCI Europe Tour	Nicola Boem (ITA)	Denmark	Frederiksberg
22 August	Tour du Limousin, Young rider classification	UCI Europe Tour	Francesco Manuel Bongiorno (ITA)	France	
28 August	Tour du Poitou-Charentes, Stage 3	UCI Europe Tour	Nicola Ruffoni (ITA)	France	L'Isle-Jourdain
9 September	Tour of Britain, Stage 3	UCI Europe Tour	Edoardo Zardini (ITA)	United Kingdom	The Tumble
20 September	Memorial Marco Pantani	UCI Europe Tour	Sonny Colbrelli (ITA)	Italy	Cesenatico
9 October	Coppa Sabatini	UCI Europe Tour	Sonny Colbrelli (ITA)	Italy	Peccioli
