= 2012 Tour de Langkawi =

2011–12 UCI Asia Tour, race 10 of 28

Race details
- Dates: 24 February–4 March 2012
- Stages: 10
- Distance: 1,413.4 km (878.2 mi)
- Winning time: 32h 55' 31"

Results
Jersey awarded to the overall winner	Winner	José Serpa (COL)	(Androni Giocattoli–Venezuela)
	Second	José Rujano (VEN)	(Androni Giocattoli–Venezuela)
	Third	Víctor Niño (COL)	(Azad University Cross Team)
Jersey awarded to the points classification winner	Points	Andrea Guardini (ITA)	(Farnese Vini–Selle Italia)
Jersey awarded to the mountains classification winner	Mountains	José Serpa (COL)	(Androni Giocattoli–Venezuela)
	Team	Androni Giocattoli–Venezuela	

The 2012 Tour de Langkawi was the 17th edition of the Tour de Langkawi, a cycling stage race that took place in Malaysia. It began on 24 February in Putrajaya and ended on 4 March in Kuala Terengganu which carried the slogan "Ready for the World". The race was sanctioned by the Union Cycliste Internationale (UCI) as a 2.HC (hors category) race on the 2011–12 UCI Asia Tour calendar.

The race was won for the second time by Colombia's José Serpa, after taking the lead of the race with his second consecutive stage win on the sixth stage, and held the lead until the end of the race. Serpa's winning margin over his Androni Giocattoli–Venezuela team-mate José Rujano was 30 seconds, and the podium was completed by Víctor Niño of the Azad University Cross Team, 33 seconds behind Rujano and 63 in arrears of Serpa. In the race's other classifications, Serpa also finished at the top of the mountains classification, Farnese Vini–Selle Italia's Andrea Guardini won the points classification, after taking a record-breaking six stage victories, and Androni Giocattoli–Venezuela finished over twelve minutes clear of their nearest rivals in the teams classification. Astana and their rider Alexsandr Dyachenko finished at the head of their respective Asian sub-classifications.

== Teams ==
22 teams accepted invitations to participate in the 2012 Tour de Langkawi. Two UCI ProTeams were invited to the race, along with seven UCI Professional Continental and ten UCI Continental teams. The field was completed by three national selection teams.

UCI ProTour teams

- Astana
- Garmin–Barracuda

UCI Professional Continental teams

- Androni Giocattoli–Venezuela
- Champion System
- Colnago–CSF Bardiani
- Farnese Vini–Selle Italia
- MTN–Qhubeka
- Team Europcar
- UnitedHealthcare

UCI Continental teams

- Aisan Racing Team
- Azad University Cross Team
- Drapac Cycling
- Max Success Sports
- OCBC Singapore Continental Cycling Team
- RTS Racing Team
- RusVelo
- Seoul Cycling Team
- Tabriz Petrochemical Team
- Terengganu Cycling Team

National teams

- Indonesia
- Malaysia
- New Zealand

== Stages ==
The race comprises 10 stages, covering 1413.4 kilometres.

Stage	Date	Course	Distance	Stage result		
Stage	Date	Course	Distance	Winner	Second	Third
1	24 February	Putrajaya Individual time trial	20.3 km (12.6 mi)	David Zabriskie (USA); Garmin–Barracuda	Adam Phelan (USA); Drapac Cycling	Darren Lapthorne (USA); Drapac Cycling
2	25 February	Putrajaya to Malacca	151 km (93.8 mi)	Andrea Guardini (ITA); Farnese Vini–Selle Italia	Jake Keough (USA); UnitedHealthcare	Christian Delle Stelle (ITA); Colnago–CSF Bardiani
3	26 February	Malacca to Parit Sulong	187.6 km (116.6 mi)	Andrea Guardini (ITA); Farnese Vini–Selle Italia	Raymond Kreder (NED); Garmin–Barracuda	Anuar Manan (MAS); Champion System
4	27 February	Batu Pahat to Muar	169.4 km (105.3 mi)	Andrea Guardini (ITA); Farnese Vini–Selle Italia	Jake Keough (USA); UnitedHealthcare	Harrif Salleh (MAS); Terengganu Cycling Team
5	28 February	Ayer Keroh to Pandan Indah	190 km (118.1 mi)	José Serpa (COL); Androni Giocattoli–Venezuela	Darren Lapthorne (AUS); Drapac Cycling	Matteo Rabottoni (ITA); Farnese Vini–Selle Italia
6	29 February	Proton, Shah Alam to Genting Highlands	108 km (67.1 mi)	José Serpa (COL); Androni Giocattoli–Venezuela	Víctor Niño (COL); Azad University Cross Team	José Rujano (VEN); Androni Giocattoli–Venezuela
7	1 March	Bentong to Kuantan	205.8 km (127.9 mi)	Marco Canola (ITA); Colnago–CSF Bardiani	Seo Joon-Yong (KOR); Seoul Cycling Team	Serguy Klimov (RUS); RusVelo
8	2 March	Pekan to Chukai	100.8 km (62.6 mi)	Andrea Guardini (ITA); Farnese Vini–Selle Italia	Harrif Salleh (MAS); Terengganu Cycling Team	Jake Keough (USA); UnitedHealthcare
9	3 March	Kemasik to Kuala Terengganu	165.7 km (103.0 mi)	Andrea Guardini (ITA); Farnese Vini–Selle Italia	Matteo Pelucci (ITA); Team Europcar	Raymond Kreder (NED); Garmin–Barracuda
10	4 March	Kenyir Lake to Kuala Terengganu Criterium	114.8 km (71.3 mi)	Andrea Guardini (ITA); Farnese Vini–Selle Italia	Jake Keough (USA); UnitedHealthcare	Sonny Colbrelli (USA); Colnago–CSF Bardiani

== Classification leadership ==
Stage	Winner	General classification	Points classification	Mountains classification	Asian rider classification	Team classification	Asian team classification
1	David Zabriskie	David Zabriskie	not available	not available	Dmitriy Gruzdev	Garmin–Barracuda	Astana
2	Andrea Guardini	David Zabriskie	Andrea Guardini	Floris Goesinnen	Dmitriy Gruzdev	Garmin–Barracuda	Astana
3	Andrea Guardini	David Zabriskie	Andrea Guardini	Floris Goesinnen	Dmitriy Gruzdev	Garmin–Barracuda	Astana
4	Andrea Guardini	David Zabriskie	Andrea Guardini	Floris Goesinnen	Dmitriy Gruzdev	Garmin–Barracuda	Astana
5	José Serpa	Darren Lapthorne	Andrea Guardini	Matteo Rabottini	Alexsandr Dyachenko	Androni Giocattoli–Venezuela	Astana
6	José Serpa	José Serpa	Andrea Guardini	José Serpa	Alexsandr Dyachenko	Androni Giocattoli–Venezuela	Astana
7	Marco Canola	José Serpa	Valentin Iglinsky	José Serpa	Alexsandr Dyachenko	Androni Giocattoli–Venezuela	Astana
8	Andrea Guardini	José Serpa	Valentin Iglinsky	José Serpa	Alexsandr Dyachenko	Androni Giocattoli–Venezuela	Astana
9	Andrea Guardini	José Serpa	Andrea Guardini	José Serpa	Alexsandr Dyachenko	Androni Giocattoli–Venezuela	Astana
10	Andrea Guardini	José Serpa	Andrea Guardini	José Serpa	Alexsandr Dyachenko	Androni Giocattoli–Venezuela	Astana
Final		José Serpa	Andrea Guardini	José Serpa	Alexsandr Dyachenko	Androni Giocattoli–Venezuela	Astana

== Final standings ==
=== General classification ===
	Rider	Team	Time
1	José Serpa (COL)	Androni Giocattoli–Venezuela	32h 55' 31"
2	José Rujano (VEN)	Androni Giocattoli–Venezuela	+ 30"
3	Víctor Niño (COL)	Azad University Cross Team	+ 01' 03"
4	Alexsandr Dyachenko (KAZ)	Astana	+ 02' 20"
5	Jackson Rodríguez (VEN)	Androni Giocattoli–Venezuela	+ 03' 50"
6	Stefano Locatelli (ITA)	Colnago–CSF Bardiani	+ 04' 15"
7	Ghader Mizbani (IRI)	Tabriz Petrochemical Team	+ 04' 23"
8	Andrey Zeits (KAZ)	Astana	+ 04' 28"
9	Dennis Van Niekerk (RSA)	MTN–Qhubeka	+ 04' 33"
10	Joseph Cooper (NZL)	New Zealand	+ 04' 44"

=== Points classification ===
	Rider	Team	Points
1	Andrea Guardini (ITA)	Farnese Vini–Selle Italia	94
2	Valentin Iglinsky (KAZ)	Astana	85
3	Jake Keough (USA)	UnitedHealthcare	79

=== Mountains classification ===
	Rider	Team	Points
1	José Serpa (COL)	Androni Giocattoli–Venezuela	27
2	Matteo Rabottini (ITA)	Farnese Vini–Selle Italia	24
3	José Rujano (VEN)	Androni Giocattoli–Venezuela	24

=== Asian rider classification ===
	Rider	Team	Time
1	Alexsandr Dyachenko (KAZ)	Astana	32h 57' 51"
2	Ghader Mizbani (IRI)	Tabriz Petrochemical Team	+ 02' 03"
3	Andrey Zeits (KAZ)	Astana	+ 02' 08"

=== Team classification ===
	Team	Time
1	Androni Giocattoli–Venezuela	98h 50' 34"
2	Astana	+ 12' 03"
3	MTN–Qhubeka	+ 13' 36"
4	Champion System	+ 13' 37"
5	Tabriz Petrochemical Team	+ 18' 08"
6	New Zealand	+ 22' 41"
7	Azad University Cross Team	+ 24' 20"
8	RusVelo	+ 25' 24"
9	Colnago–CSF Bardiani	+ 27' 56"
10	Terengganu Cycling Team	+ 28' 55"

=== Asian team classification ===
	Team	Time
1	Astana	99h 02' 37"
2	Tabriz Petrochemical Team	+ 06' 05"
3	Terengganu Cycling Team	+ 16' 52"
4	Aisan Racing Team	+ 27' 24"
5	Seoul Cycling Team	+ 28' 44"
6	Malaysia	+ 31' 14"
7	Indonesia	+ 33' 17"
8	Max Success Sport	+ 40' 52"
9	Azad University Cross Team	+ 01h 07' 08"
10	OCBC Singapore Continental Cycling Team	+ 01h 34' 23"

== Stage results ==
=== Stage 1 ===
24 February 2012 — Putrajaya, 20.3 km (12.6 mi), Individual time trial

	Rider	Team	Time
1	David Zabriskie (USA)	Garmin–Barracuda	24' 34"
2	Adam Phelan (AUS)	Drapac Cycling	+ 01' 00"
3	Darren Lapthorne (AUS)	Drapac Cycling	+ 01' 10"
4	Tom Danielson (USA)	Garmin–Barracuda	+ 01' 17"
5	José Rujano (VEN)	Androni Giocattoli–Venezuela	+ 01' 26"
6	Joseph Cooper (NZL)	New Zealand	+ 01' 31"
7	Dmitriy Gruzdev (KAZ)	Astana	+ 01' 33"
8	Alexsandr Dyachenko (KAZ)	Astana	+ 01' 38"
9	Nathan Haas (AUS)	Garmin–Barracuda	+ 01' 39"
10	Behnam Khalilikhosroshahi (IRI)	Tabriz Petrochemical Team	+ 01' 46"

=== Stage 2 ===
25 February 2012 — Putrajaya to Melaka, 151 km (93.8 mi)

	Rider	Team	Time
1	Andrea Guardini (ITA)	Farnese Vini–Selle Italia	03h 35' 19"
2	Jake Keough (USA)	UnitedHealthcare	+ 0"
3	Christian Delle Stelle (ITA)	Colnago–CSF Bardiani	+ 0"
4	Anuar Manan (MAS)	Champion System	+ 0"
5	Raymond Kreder (NED)	Garmin–Barracuda	+ 0"
6	Jani Tewelde (ERI)	MTN–Qhubeka	+ 0"
7	Yohann Gène (FRA)	Team Europcar	+ 0"
8	Marco Canola (ITA)	Colnago–CSF Bardiani	+ 0"
9	Valentin Iglinsky (KAZ)	Astana	+ 0"
10	Zamri Salleh (MAS)	Terengganu Cycling Team	+ 0"

=== Stage 3 ===
26 February 2012 — Melaka to Parit Sulong, 187.6 km (116.6 mi)

	Rider	Team	Time
1	Andrea Guardini (ITA)	Farnese Vini–Selle Italia	04h 30' 11"
2	Raymond Kreder (NED)	Garmin–Barracuda	+ 0"
3	Anuar Manan (MAS)	Champion System	+ 0"
4	Sonny Colbrelli (ITA)	Colnago–CSF Bardiani	+ 0"
5	Valentin Iglinsky (KAZ)	Astana	+ 0"
6	Jake Keough (USA)	UnitedHealthcare	+ 0"
7	Hossein Nateghi (IRI)	Tabriz Petrochemical Team	+ 0"
8	Roman Van Uden (NZL)	New Zealand	+ 0"
9	Ramin Maleki Mizan (IRI)	Tabriz Petrochemical Team	+ 0"
10	James Williamson (NZL)	New Zealand	+ 0"

=== Stage 4 ===
27 February 2012 — Batu Pahat to Muar, 169.4 km (105.3 mi)

	Rider	Team	Time
1	Andrea Guardini (ITA)	Farnese Vini–Selle Italia	03h 57' 11"
2	Jake Keough (USA)	UnitedHealthcare	+ 0"
3	Harrif Salleh (MAS)	Terengganu Cycling Team	+ 0"
4	Yohann Gène (FRA)	Team Europcar	+ 0"
5	Valentin Iglinsky (KAZ)	Astana	+ 0"
6	Sonny Colbrelli (ITA)	Colnago–CSF Bardiani	+ 0"
7	Anuar Manan (MAS)	Champion System	+ 0"
8	Kévin Reza (FRA)	Team Europcar	+ 0"
9	Jani Tewelde (ERI)	MTN–Qhubeka	+ 0"
10	Hossein Nateghi (IRI)	Tabriz Petrochemical Team	+ 0"

=== Stage 5 ===
28 February 2012 — Ayer Keroh to Pandan Indah, 190 km (118.1 mi)

	Rider	Team	Time
1	José Serpa (COL)	Androni Giocattoli–Venezuela	4h 32' 17"
2	Darren Lapthorne (AUS)	Drapac Cycling	+ 0"
3	Matteo Rabottini (ITA)	Farnese Vini–Selle Italia	+ 11"
4	Adiq Husainie Othman (MAS)	Champion System	+ 11"
5	Alexsandr Dyachenko (KAZ)	Astana	+ 11"
6	Víctor Niño (COL)	Azad University Cross Team	+ 11"
7	Ghader Mizbani (IRI)	Tabriz Petrochemical Team	+ 11"
8	Jani Tewelde (ERI)	MTN–Qhubeka	+ 24"
9	Valentin Iglinskiy (KAZ)	Astana	+ 24"
10	Taiji Nishitani (JPN)	Aisan Racing Team	+ 24"

=== Stage 6 ===
29 February 2012 — Proton, Shah Alam to Genting Highlands, 108 km (67.1 mi)

	Rider	Team	Time
1	José Serpa (COL)	Androni Giocattoli–Venezuela	03h 09' 37"
2	Víctor Niño (COL)	Azad University Cross Team	+ 02"
3	José Rujano (VEN)	Androni Giocattoli–Venezuela	+ 46"
4	Alexsandr Dyachenko (KAZ)	Astana	+ 2' 32"
5	Jackson Rodríguez (VEN)	Androni Giocattoli–Venezuela	+ 2' 53"
6	Stefano Locatelli (ITA)	Colnago–CSF Bardiani	+ 2' 53"
7	Matteo Rabottini (ITA)	Farnese Vini–Selle Italia	+ 3' 25"
8	Chris Butler (USA)	Champion System	+ 3' 26"
9	Andrey Zeits (KAZ)	Astana	+ 3' 28"
10	Dennis Van Niekerk (RSA)	MTN–Qhubeka	+ 3' 35"

=== Stage 7 ===
1 March 2012 — Bentong to Kuantan, 205.8 km (127.9 mi)

	Rider	Team	Time
1	Marco Canola (ITA)	Colnago–CSF Bardiani	4h 25' 17"
2	Seo Joon-Yong (KOR)	Seoul Cycling Team	+ 0"
3	Serguy Klimov (RUS)	RusVelo	+ 0"
4	Mathieu Claude (FRA)	Team Europcar	+ 0"
5	Floris Goesinnen (NED)	Drapac Cycling	+ 0"
6	Raymond Kreder (NED)	Garmin–Barracuda	+ 11"
7	Valentin Iglinskiy (KAZ)	Astana	+ 11"
8	Suhardi Hassan (MAS)	Malaysia	+ 11"
9	Yohann Gène (FRA)	Team Europcar	+ 11"
10	Kenichi Suzuki (JPN)	Aisan Racing Team	+ 13"

=== Stage 8 ===
2 March 2012 — Pekan to Chukai, 100.8 km (62.6 mi)

	Rider	Team	Time
1	Andrea Guardini (ITA)	Farnese Vini–Selle Italia	2h 13' 27"
2	Harrif Salleh (MAS)	Terengganu Cycling Team	+ 0"
3	Jake Keough (USA)	UnitedHealthcare	+ 0"
4	Hossein Nateghi (IRI)	Tabriz Petrochemical Team	+ 0"
5	Matteo Pelucci (ITA)	Team Europcar	+ 0"
6	Taiji Nishitani (JPN)	Aisan Racing Team	+ 0"
7	Sonny Colbrelli (ITA)	Colnago–CSF Bardiani	+ 0"
8	Valentin Iglinsky (KAZ)	Astana	+ 0"
9	Jani Tewelde (ERI)	MTN–Qhubeka	+ 0"
10	Raymond Kreder (NED)	Garmin–Barracuda	+ 0"

=== Stage 9 ===
3 March 2012 — Kemasik to Kuala Terengganu, 165.7 km (103.0 mi)

	Rider	Team	Time
1	Andrea Guardini (ITA)	Farnese Vini–Selle Italia	03h 27' 06"
2	Matteo Pelucci (ITA)	Team Europcar	+ 0"
3	Raymond Kreder (NED)	Garmin–Barracuda	+ 0"
4	Jake Keough (USA)	UnitedHealthcare	+ 0"
5	Sonny Colbrelli (ITA)	Colnago–CSF Bardiani	+ 0"
6	Valentin Iglinsky (KAZ)	Astana	+ 0"
7	Jani Tewelde (ERI)	MTN–Qhubeka	+ 0"
8	Zamri Salleh (MAS)	Terengganu Cycling Team	+ 0"
9	Thomas Bertonlini (ITA)	Farnese Vini–Selle Italia	+ 0"
10	Harrif Salleh (MAS)	Terengganu Cycling Team	+ 0"

=== Stage 10 ===
4 March 2012 — Kenyir Lake to Kuala Terengganu, 116.9 km (72.6 mi), Criterium

	Rider	Team	Time
1	Andrea Guardini (ITA)	Farnese Vini–Selle Italia	2h 36' 42"
2	Jake Keough (USA)	UnitedHealthcare	+ 0"
3	Sonny Colbrelli (ITA)	Colnago–CSF Bardiani	+ 0"
4	Harrif Salleh (MAS)	Terengganu Cycling Team	+ 0"
5	Raymond Kreder (NED)	Garmin–Barracuda	+ 0"
6	Christian Delle Stelle (ITA)	Colnago–CSF Bardiani	+ 0"
7	Hossei Nateghi (IRI)	Tabriz Petrochemical Team	+ 0"
8	Robert Forster (GER)	UnitedHealthcare	+ 3"
9	Matteo Pelucchi (ITA)	Team Europcar	+ 3"
10	Valentin Iglinsky (KAZ)	Astana	+ 3"
