= 2015 Bardiani–CSF season =

Bardiani–CSF
- 2015 season
- UCI code: BAR
- Status: UCI Professional Continental
- Manager: Roberto Reverberi
- Main sponsor(s): Bardiani Valvole & CSF Inox
- Based: Italy
- Bicycles: MCipollini

Season victories
- One-day races: 1
- Stage race overall: 1
- Stage race stages: 2

The 2015 season for the Bardiani–CSF cycling team began in February at the Dubai Tour. Bardiani–CSF is an Italian-registered UCI Professional Continental cycling team that participated in road bicycle racing events on the UCI Continental Circuits and when selected as a wildcard to UCI ProTour events.

== 2015 roster ==
Rider	Date of birth
Simone Andreetta (ITA)	30 August 1993 (aged 21)
Enrico Barbin (ITA)	4 March 1990 (aged 24)
Enrico Battaglin (ITA)	17 November 1989 (aged 25)
Nicola Boem (ITA)	27 September 1989 (aged 25)
Francesco Manuel Bongiorno (ITA)	1 September 1990 (aged 24)
Luca Chirico (ITA)	16 July 1992 (aged 22)
Sonny Colbrelli (ITA)	17 May 1990 (aged 24)
Andrea Manfredi (ITA)	10 February 1992 (aged 22)

Rider	Date of birth
Andrea Piechele (ITA)	29 June 1987 (aged 27)
Stefano Pirazzi (ITA)	11 March 1987 (aged 27)
Nicola Ruffoni (ITA)	14 December 1990 (aged 24)
Paolo Simion (ITA)	10 October 1992 (aged 22)
Luca Sterbini (ITA)	12 November 1992 (aged 22)
Simone Sterbini (ITA)	11 December 1993 (aged 21)
Alessandro Tonelli (ITA)	29 May 1992 (aged 22)
Edoardo Zardini (ITA)	2 November 1989 (aged 25)

Riders who joined the team for the 2015 season

Rider	2014 team
Simone Andreetta	neo-pro (Zalf-Euromobil-Fior)
Luca Chirico	neo-pro (MG.Kvis-Wilier)
Paolo Simion	neo-pro (Mastromarco Chianti)
Luca Sterbini	neo-pro (Palazzago)
Simone Sterbini	neo-pro (Palazzago)
Alessandro Tonelli	neo-pro (Zalf-Euromobil-Fior)

Riders who left the team during or after the 2014 season

Rider	2015 team
Marco Canola	UnitedHealthcare
Marco Coledan	Trek Factory Racing
Paolo Colonna	
Donato De Ieso	
Filippo Fortin	GM-VC Abruzzo
Stefano Locatelli	Retired
Angelo Pagani	Retired

== Season victories ==
Date	Race	Competition	Rider	Country	Location
19 May	Giro d'Italia, Stage 10	UCI World Tour	Nicola Boem (ITA)	Italy	Forlì
18 August	Tour du Limousin, Stage 1	UCI Europe Tour	Sonny Colbrelli (ITA)	France	Saint-Yrieix-la-Perche
21 August	Tour du Limousin, Overall	UCI Europe Tour	Sonny Colbrelli (ITA)	France	
11 October	Gran Premio Bruno Beghelli	UCI Europe Tour	Sonny Colbrelli (ITA)	Italy	Monteveglio
