= 2013 Giro del Trentino =

2013 UCI Europe Tour

Race details
- Dates: 16–19 April 2013
- Stages: 5
- Distance: 710.3 km (441.4 mi)
- Winning time: 17h 49' 11"

Results
Jersey awarded to the overall winner	Winner	Vincenzo Nibali (ITA)	(Astana)
	Second	Mauro Santambrogio (ITA)	(Vini Fantini–Selle Italia)
	Third	Maxime Bouet (FRA)	(Ag2r–La Mondiale)
Jersey awarded to the mountains classification winner	Mountains	Vincenzo Nibali (ITA)	(Astana)
Jersey awarded to the youth classification winner	Youth	Fabio Aru (ITA)	(Astana)
Jersey awarded to the sprints classification winner	Sprints	Jarlinson Pantano (COL)	(Colombia)
	Team	Astana	

The 2013 Giro del Trentino was the 37th edition of the Giro del Trentino cycling stage race. It started on 16 April in Lienz (Austria) and ended on 19 April in Sega di Ala. The race, that was officially presented on 8 April in Trento, consisted of four stages, with the first one divided into two half-stages.

The race was won by Astana rider Vincenzo Nibali, who claimed the leader's jersey in the final stage and won the King of the Mountains classification as well. Mauro Santambrogio (Vini Fantini-Selle Italia) was second and Maxime Bouet of Ag2r–La Mondiale completed the podium. In the race's other classifications, Jarlinson Pantano of Colombia won the Sprints classification and Astana's Fabio Aru won the Young Rider classification, with Astana finishing at the head of the Teams classification.

== Teams ==
Six World Tour teams took part in the race: Ag2r–La Mondiale, Astana, BMC, Cannondale, Lampre–Merida and Team Sky. Among the riders, there were six Grand Tour-winners: Vincenzo Nibali, Bradley Wiggins, Cadel Evans, Ivan Basso, Michele Scarponi and Stefano Garzelli.

A total of 18 teams were invited to the race:

UCI ProTeams
- Ag2r–La Mondiale
- Astana
- BMC Racing Team
- Cannondale
- Lampre–Merida
- Team Sky
UCI Professional Continental Teams
- Team Europcar
- Androni Giocattoli–Venezuela
- Bardiani Valvole–CSF Inox
- CCC–Polsat–Polkowice
- Vini Fantini–Selle Italia
- Colombia
- Caja Rural–Seguros RGA
- Champion System
- RusVelo
- MTN–Qhubeka
- NetApp–Endura
UCI Continental Teams
- Ceramica Flaminia–Fondriest

== Race overview ==
Stage	Date	Course	Distance	Type	Winner	Ref
1a	16 April	Lienz (Austria) to Lienz	128.5 km (79.8 mi)	Flat Stage	Maxime Bouet (FRA)	
1b	16 April	Lienz	14.1 km (8.8 mi)	Team time trial	Team Sky	
2	17 April	Sillian (Austria) to Vetriolo Terme	224.8 km (139.7 mi)	Mountain stage	Kanstantsin Sivtsov (BLR)	
3	18 April	Pergine Valsugana to Condino (Valle del Chiese)	176.1 km (109.4 mi)	Intermediate stage	Ivan Santaromita (ITA)	
4	19 April	Arco to Sega di Ala	166.8 km (103.6 mi)	Mountain stage	Vincenzo Nibali (ITA)	

== Stages ==
=== Stage 1a ===
16 April 2013 – Lienz (Austria) to Lienz, 128.5 km (79.8 mi)

Stage 1a Result
	Rider	Team	Time
1	Maxime Bouet (FRA)	Ag2r–La Mondiale	2h 48' 59"
2	Josef Černý (CZE)	CCC–Polsat–Polkowice	s.t.
3	Michael Rodríguez (COL)	Colombia	s.t.
4	Nicola Dal Santo (ITA)	Ceramica Flaminia–Fondriest	+ 39"
5	Enzo Mojano (ARG)	Caja Rural–Seguros RGA	+ 39"
6	Pavel Kochetkov (RUS)	RusVelo	+ 39"
7	Jacques Janse van Rensburg (RSA)	MTN–Qhubeka	+ 41"
8	Xu Gang (CHN)	Champion System	+ 1' 11"
9	Enrico Battaglin (ITA)	Bardiani Valvole–CSF Inox	+ 6' 51"
10	Leonardo Duque (COL)	Colombia	+ 6' 51"

General Classification after Stage 1a
	Rider	Team	Time
1	Maxime Bouet (FRA)	Ag2r–La Mondiale	2h 48' 53"
2	Josef Černý (CZE)	CCC–Polsat–Polkowice	+ 2"
3	Michael Rodríguez (COL)	Colombia	+ 4"
4	Nicola Dal Santo (ITA)	Ceramica Flaminia–Fondriest	+ 45"
5	Enzo Mojano (ARG)	Caja Rural–Seguros RGA	+ 45"
6	Pavel Kochetkov (RUS)	RusVelo	+ 45"
7	Jacques Janse van Rensburg (RSA)	MTN–Qhubeka	+ 47"
8	Xu Gang (CHN)	Champion System	+ 1' 17"
9	Enrico Battaglin (ITA)	Bardiani Valvole–CSF Inox	+ 6' 57"
10	Leonardo Duque (COL)	Colombia	+ 6' 57"

=== Stage 1b ===
16 April 2013 – Lienz, 14.1 km (8.8 mi) team time trial (TTT)

Stage 1b Result
	Team	Time
1	Team Sky	15' 20"
2	Astana	+ 13"
3	Lampre–Merida	+ 16"
4	NetApp–Endura	+ 24"
5	Team Europcar	+ 35"
6	Bardiani Valvole–CSF Inox	+ 35"
7	Vini Fantini–Selle Italia	+ 39"
8	Androni Giocattoli–Venezuela	+ 44"
9	BMC Racing Team	+ 49"
10	Cannondale	+ 49"

General Classification after Stage 1b
	Rider	Team	Time
1	Josef Černý (CZE)	CCC–Polsat–Polkowice	3h 05' 07"
2	Maxime Bouet (FRA)	Ag2r–La Mondiale	+11"
3	Michael Rodríguez (COL)	Colombia	+ 16"
4	Jacques Janse van Rensburg (RSA)	MTN–Qhubeka	+ 44"
5	Pavel Kochetkov (RUS)	RusVelo	+ 49"
6	Enzo Mojano (ARG)	Caja Rural–Seguros RGA	+ 50"
7	Nicola Dal Santo (ITA)	Ceramica Flaminia–Fondriest	+ 59"
8	Xu Gang (CHN)	Champion System	+ 2' 05"
9	Peter Kennaugh (GBR)	Team Sky	+ 6' 03"
10	Christian Knees (GER)	Team Sky	+ 6' 03"

=== Stage 2 ===
17 April 2013 – Sillian (Austria) to Vetriolo Terme, 224.8 km (139.7 mi)

Stage 2 Result
	Rider	Team	Time
1	Kanstantsin Sivtsov (BLR)	Team Sky	5h 48' 07"
2	Mauro Santambrogio (ITA)	Vini Fantini–Selle Italia	+ 4"
3	Vincenzo Nibali (ITA)	Astana	+ 19"
4	Bradley Wiggins (GBR)	Team Sky	+ 19"
5	Domenico Pozzovivo (ITA)	Ag2r–La Mondiale	+ 28"
6	Stefano Pirazzi (ITA)	Bardiani Valvole–CSF Inox	+ 34"
7	Fabio Aru (ITA)	Astana	+ 37"
8	Alexsandr Dyachenko (KAZ)	Astana	+ 38"
9	Pierre Rolland (FRA)	Team Europcar	+ 45"
10	Cadel Evans (AUS)	BMC Racing Team	+ 45"

General Classification after Stage 2
	Rider	Team	Time
1	Maxime Bouet (FRA)	Ag2r–La Mondiale	8h 55' 48"
2	Kanstantsin Sivtsov (BLR)	Team Sky	+ 3' 19"
3	Pavel Kochetkov (RUS)	RusVelo	+ 3' 35"
4	Bradley Wiggins (GBR)	Team Sky	+ 3' 48"
5	Vincenzo Nibali (ITA)	Astana	+ 3' 57"
6	Michael Rodríguez (COL)	Colombia	+ 4' 02"
7	Mauro Santambrogio (ITA)	Vini Fantini–Selle Italia	+ 4' 06"
8	Fabio Aru (ITA)	Astana	+ 4' 19"
9	Alexsandr Dyachenko (KAZ)	Astana	+ 4' 20"
10	Stefano Pirazzi (ITA)	Bardiani Valvole–CSF Inox	+ 4' 38"

=== Stage 3 ===
18 April 2013 – Pergine Valsugana to Condino (Valle del Chiese), 176.1 km (109.4 mi)

Stage 3 Result
	Rider	Team	Time
1	Ivan Santaromita (ITA)	BMC Racing Team	4h 26' 25"
2	Paolo Tiralongo (ITA)	Astana	s.t.
3	Michele Scarponi (ITA)	Lampre–Merida	s.t.
4	Stefano Locatelli (ITA)	Bardiani Valvole–CSF Inox	+ 34"
5	Cayetano Sarmiento (COL)	Cannondale	+ 34"
6	Antonio Piedra (ESP)	Caja Rural–Seguros RGA	+ 34"
7	Stefano Pirazzi (ITA)	Bardiani Valvole–CSF Inox	+ 1' 12"
8	Enrico Battaglin (ITA)	Bardiani Valvole–CSF Inox	+ 1' 23"
9	Emanuele Sella (ITA)	Androni Giocattoli–Venezuela	+ 1' 23"
10	Miguel Ángel Rubiano (COL)	Androni Giocattoli–Venezuela	+ 1' 23"

General Classification after Stage 3
	Rider	Team	Time
1	Maxime Bouet (FRA)	Ag2r–La Mondiale	13h 23' 36"
2	Kanstantsin Sivtsov (BLR)	Team Sky	+ 3' 19"
3	Bradley Wiggins (GBR)	Team Sky	+ 3' 48"
4	Vincenzo Nibali (ITA)	Astana	+ 3' 57"
5	Mauro Santambrogio (ITA)	Vini Fantini–Selle Italia	+ 4' 06"
6	Fabio Aru (ITA)	Astana	+ 4' 19"
7	Alexsandr Dyachenko (KAZ)	Astana	+ 4' 20"
8	Stefano Pirazzi (ITA)	Bardiani Valvole–CSF Inox	+ 4' 27"
9	Pierre Rolland (FRA)	Team Europcar	+ 4' 49"
10	Przemysław Niemiec (POL)	Lampre–Merida	+ 4' 52"

=== Stage 4 ===
19 April 2013 – Arco to Sega di Ala, 166.8 km (103.6 mi)

Stage 4 Result
	Rider	Team	Time
1	Vincenzo Nibali (ITA)	Astana	4h 21' 48"
2	Mauro Santambrogio (ITA)	Vini Fantini–Selle Italia	+ 8"
3	Przemysław Niemiec (POL)	Lampre–Merida	+ 44"
4	Fabio Aru (ITA)	Astana	+ 44"
5	Cadel Evans (AUS)	BMC Racing Team	+ 1' 02"
6	Stefano Locatelli (ITA)	Bardiani Valvole–CSF Inox	+ 1' 10"
7	Stefano Pirazzi (ITA)	Bardiani Valvole–CSF Inox	+ 1' 35"
8	Marcos García (ESP)	Caja Rural–Seguros RGA	+ 1' 37"
9	Bradley Wiggins (GBR)	Team Sky	+ 1' 39"
10	Pierre Rolland (FRA)	Team Europcar	+ 2' 20"

General Classification after Stage 4
	Rider	Team	Time
1	Vincenzo Nibali (ITA)	Astana	17h 49' 11"
2	Mauro Santambrogio (ITA)	Vini Fantini–Selle Italia	+ 21"
3	Maxime Bouet (FRA)	Ag2r–La Mondiale	+ 55"
4	Fabio Aru (ITA)	Astana	+ 1' 16"
5	Bradley Wiggins (GBR)	Team Sky	+ 1' 40"
6	Przemysław Niemiec (POL)	Lampre–Merida	+ 1' 45"
7	Stefano Pirazzi (ITA)	Bardiani Valvole–CSF Inox	+ 2' 15"
8	Cadel Evans (AUS)	BMC Racing Team	+ 2' 18"
9	Stefano Locatelli (ITA)	Bardiani Valvole–CSF Inox	+ 3' 05"
10	Pierre Rolland (FRA)	Team Europcar	+ 3' 22"

== Classification leadership table ==
Stage	Winner	General Classification	Mountains Classification	Sprints Classification	Young Rider Classification	Team Classification
1a	Maxime Bouet	Maxime Bouet	Michael Rodríguez	Pavel Kochetkov	Josef Černý	n/a
1b	Team Sky	Josef Černý	Michael Rodríguez	Pavel Kochetkov	Josef Černý	CCC–Polsat–Polkowice
2	Kanstantsin Sivtsov	Maxime Bouet	Kanstantsin Sivtsov	Pavel Kochetkov	Michael Rodríguez	Caja Rural–Seguros RGA
3	Ivan Santaromita	Maxime Bouet	Michele Scarponi	Cayetano Sarmiento	Fabio Aru	Astana
4	Vincenzo Nibali	Vincenzo Nibali	Vincenzo Nibali	Jarlinson Pantano	Fabio Aru	Astana
Final		Vincenzo Nibali	Vincenzo Nibali	Jarlinson Pantano	Fabio Aru	Astana

== Final standings ==
=== General classification ===
	Rider	Team	Time
1	Vincenzo Nibali (ITA)	Astana	17h 49' 11"
2	Mauro Santambrogio (ITA)	Vini Fantini–Selle Italia	+ 21"
3	Maxime Bouet (FRA)	Ag2r–La Mondiale	+ 55"
4	Fabio Aru (ITA)	Astana	+ 1' 16"
5	Bradley Wiggins (GBR)	Team Sky	+ 1' 40"
6	Przemysław Niemiec (POL)	Lampre–Merida	+ 1' 45"
7	Stefano Pirazzi (ITA)	Bardiani Valvole–CSF Inox	+ 2' 15"
8	Cadel Evans (AUS)	BMC Racing Team	+ 2' 18"
9	Stefano Locatelli (ITA)	Bardiani Valvole–CSF Inox	+ 3' 05"
10	Pierre Rolland (FRA)	Team Europcar	+ 3' 22"

=== King of the Mountains classification ===
	Rider	Team	Points
1	Vincenzo Nibali (ITA)	Astana	16
2	Mauro Santambrogio (ITA)	Vini Fantini–Selle Italia	16
3	Michele Scarponi (ITA)	Lampre–Merida	9

=== Points classification ===
	Rider	Team	Points
1	Jarlinson Pantano (COL)	Colombia	6
2	Cayetano Sarmiento (COL)	Cannondale	6
3	Pavel Kochetkov (RUS)	RusVelo	6

=== Young Rider classification ===
	Rider	Team	Time
1	Fabio Aru (ITA)	Astana	17h 50' 27"
2	Stefano Locatelli (ITA)	Bardiani Valvole–CSF Inox	+ 1' 49"
3	Diego Rosa (ITA)	Androni Giocattoli–Venezuela	+ 3' 44"

=== Teams classification ===
	Team	Time
1	Astana	53h 00' 56"
2	Caja Rural–Seguros RGA	+ 6' 02"
3	Androni Giocattoli–Venezuela	+ 16' 25"
