= Guardini =

Guardini is an Italian surname. Notable people with the surname include:

- Andrea Guardini (born 1989), Italian cyclist
- Romano Guardini (1885–1968), Italian-born German Roman Catholic priest and theologian
