= Michael Rodríguez (cyclist) =

Colombian cyclist

Personal information
- Full name: Michael Rodríguez Galindo
- Born: 29 July 1989 (age 37) Colombia

Cycling career
- Sport: Cycling
- Current team: Fundación Herrera Team HYF
- Discipline: Road
- Role: Rider
- Rider type: Climber

Amateur teams
- 2010–2011: Boyacá orgullo de América
- 2014: EBSA–Indiaportes Boyacá
- 2015: Raza de Campeones Loteria da Boyacá
- 2020–: Fundación Herrera Team HYF

Professional teams
- 2012–2013: Colombia–Coldeportes
- 2016: Boyacá Raza de Campeones
- 2017: Canels Turbo

Michael Rodríguez Galindo (born 29 July 1989) is a Colombian road racing cyclist, who currently rides for Colombian amateur team Fundación Herrera Team HYF. Rodriguez specialises as a climber.

== Biography ==
Rodríguez's first strong international performance came with a 6th-place finish riding for the Colombia national team at the 2011 Tour de l'Avenir. He signed for the Colombia–Coldeportes team when it formed in 2012, and was retained into the 2013 season. His first high placing in an open-age race came in stage 1a of the 2013 Giro del Trentino, where he finished third as part of a breakaway in the opening stage.

== Major results ==
2008
5th Overall Vuelta a Bolivia
2009
3rd Time trial, National Under-23 Road Championships
2011
6th Overall Tour de l'Avenir
