= Jackson Rodríguez =

Venezuelan road bicycle racer

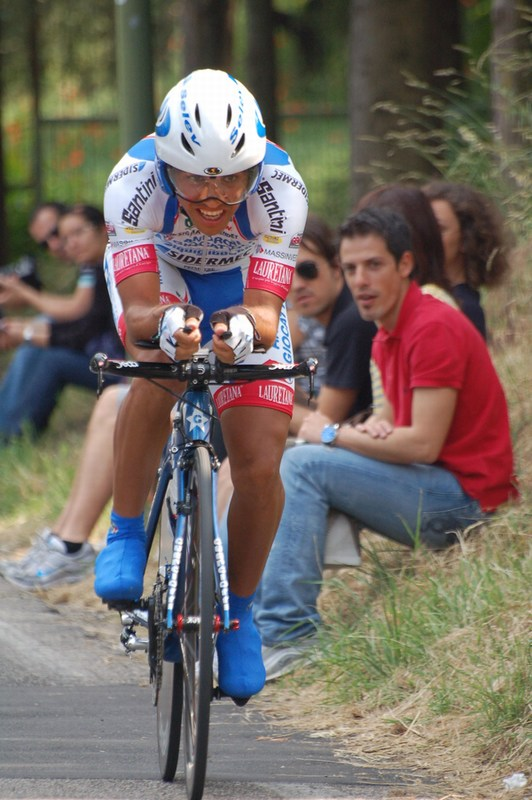

Personal information
- Full name: Jackson Jesús Rodríguez Ortíz
- Born: February 25, 1985 (age 41) Rubio, Venezuela
- Height: 1.70 m (5 ft 7 in)
- Weight: 58 kg (128 lb)

Cycling career
- Sport: Cycling
- Current team: JHS Grupo–Super Ahorro
- Discipline: Road
- Role: Rider

Amateur teams
- 2005–2007: Loteria del Táchira
- 2016–2017: JHS Aves–Intac.Táchira
- 2018–2019: Deportivo Táchira–JHS
- 2019–: JHS Grupo–Andiempaques

Professional teams
- 2008–2015: Diquigiovanni–Androni
- 2017: China Continental Team of Gansu Bank

Jackson Jesús Rodríguez Ortíz (born February 25, 1985, in Rubio) is a Venezuelan professional road bicycle racer, who currently rides for amateur team JHS Grupo–Super Ahorro.

== Major results ==
2005
4th Overall Vuelta a Venezuela
8th Overall Vuelta a Cuba

1st Young rider classification

10th Overall Vuelta al Táchira

1st Stage 5

2006
1st Stage 7 Clásico Ciclístico Banfoandes
4th Road race, Central American and Caribbean Games
5th Overall Vuelta a Cuba

1st Young rider classification
1st Stage 2

7th Overall Vuelta al Táchira

1st Young rider classification
1st Stage 11

9th Overall Vuelta a Venezuela

1st Mountains classification
1st Stage 5

2007
3rd Overall Vuelta al Táchira

1st Points classification
1st Young rider classification
1st Stage 2 (TTT)

8th Road race, Pan American Road Championships
2008
1st Stage 5a Vuelta a la Independencia Nacional
1st Stage 3 Vuelta a Bramón
3rd Overall Volta ao Alentejo

1st Stage 1

4th Tour du Finistère
7th Overall Tour de Langkawi
8th Overall Vuelta a Venezuela

1st Stage 2

10th Overall Tour of Qinghai Lake
10th Overall Clásico Ciclístico Banfoandes
2009
1st Overall Vuelta Mexico Telmex

1st Stage 2

3rd Overall Tour de Langkawi
3rd GP Industria & Artigianato di Larciano
10th Overall Tour de San Luis
10th Overall Giro del Trentino
2010
5th GP Industria & Artigianato di Larciano
6th Overall Tour de San Luis

1st Stage 5

6th Giro dell'Appennino
8th Overall Settimana Internazionale di Coppi e Bartali
2011
1st Stage 1b (TTT) Settimana Internazionale di Coppi e Bartali
4th Giro dell'Appennino
10th GP Industria & Artigianato di Larciano
2012
1st Stage 5 Vuelta a Venezuela
5th Overall Tour de Langkawi
2013
6th Overall Vuelta a Venezuela

1st Stages 6 & 9

9th GP Industria & Artigianato di Larciano
2014
8th Road race, Central American and Caribbean Games
2016
1st Stage 10 Vuelta al Táchira
2017
9th Overall Vuelta al Táchira

1st Stage 2

2019
1st Stage 3 Vuelta Ciclista a Miranda

=== Grand Tour general classification results timeline ===
Grand Tour	2009	2010	2011	2012	2013	2014
Giro d'Italia	26	51	DNF	49	50	86
Tour de France	Has not contested during his career					
Vuelta a España	Has not contested during his career					

Legend
—	Did not compete
DNF	Did not finish
