= Andrea Guardini =

Italian racing cyclist

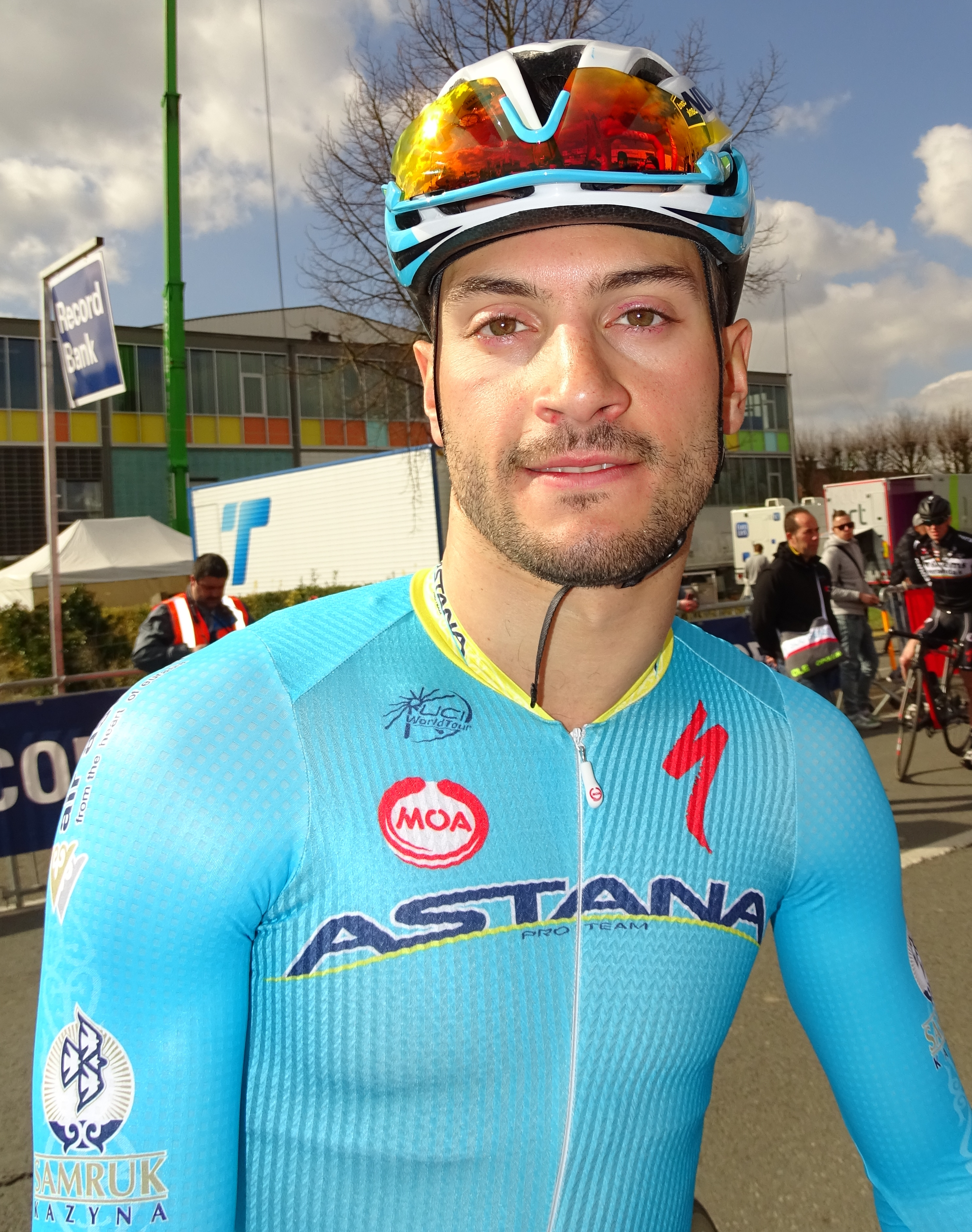
- Guardini at the 2015 E3 Harelbeke

Personal information
- Full name: Andrea Guardini
- Nickname: Mr. Langkawi
- Born: 12 June 1989 (age 37) Tregnago, Italy
- Height: 1.68 m (5 ft 6 in)
- Weight: 68 kg (150 lb)

Cycling career
- Sport: Cycling
- Disciplines: Road; Track
- Role: Rider
- Rider type: Sprinter

Amateur teams
- 2008–2009: Lucchini Neri Comauto Cocif
- 2010: Casati NGC Perrel

Professional teams
- 2010: → ISD–NERI (stagiaire)
- 2011–2012: Farnese Vini–Neri Sottoli
- 2013–2016: Astana
- 2017: UAE Abu Dhabi
- 2018–2019: Bardiani–CSF
- 2020–2021: Giotti Victoria

Major wins
- Grand Tours Giro d'Italia 1 individual stage (2012)

Andrea Guardini (born 12 June 1989) is an Italian former professional cyclist, who rode professionally between 2011 and 2021 for the Farnese Vini–Selle Italia, Astana, UAE Team Emirates, Bardiani–CSF and Giotti Victoria–Savini Due teams.

A sprinter, Guardini currently holds the record for most stage wins at the Tour de Langkawi with twenty-four stage victories; recording five at the 2011 race, six in 2012, one in 2013, two in 2014 and 2018, and four in 2015 and 2016. With 43 career wins, the majority of his victories came in the Tour de Langkawi.

== Major results ==
2007
4th Road race, UEC European Junior Road Championships
2009
3rd Road race, Mediterranean Games
3rd Circuito del Porto
2010
1st Stage 3 Girobio
2011
Tour de Langkawi

1st Points classification
1st Stages 1, 2, 6, 7 & 10

Tour of Turkey

1st Stages 1 & 7

1st Stage 5 Tour of Qatar
1st Stage 5 Volta a Portugal
1st Stage 3 Tour of Slovenia
1st Stage 5 Giro di Padania
2012
1st Stage 18 Giro d'Italia
Tour de Langkawi

1st Points classification
1st Stages 2, 3, 4, 8, 9 & 10

Tour of Qinghai Lake

1st Stages 9, 10 & 12

3rd Grand Prix de Denain
2013
1st Stage 7 Tour de Langkawi
4th Scheldeprijs
2014
Tour de Langkawi

1st Stages 3 & 10

Danmark Rundt

1st Stages 2 & 4

1st Stage 1 Eneco Tour
8th Scheldeprijs
2015
Tour of Oman

1st Points classification
1st Stage 1

Tour de Langkawi

1st Stages 1, 2, 4 & 8

1st Stage 1 Abu Dhabi Tour
1st Stage 1 World Ports Classic
2nd Overall Tour de Picardie

1st Stage 2

2016
Tour de Langkawi

1st Points classification
1st Stages 1, 5, 7 & 8

9th Overall Tour de Picardie
2018
Tour de Langkawi

1st Points classification
1st Stages 1 & 8

1st Stage 4 Tour of Hainan
8th Giro del Piemonte
2019
1st Stage 3 Istrian Spring Trophy
1st Stage 10 Tour of Qinghai Lake
2nd Trofej Umag
2020
Tour of Romania

1st Stages 1 & 5

2021
3rd Overall Tour of Szeklerland

1st Stages 1 & 3

4th Grand Prix Gazipaşa
4th GP Manavgat

=== Grand Tour general classification results timeline ===
Grand Tour	2012	2013	2014	2015	2016	2017	2018
Giro d'Italia	DNF	—	—	—	—	—	DNF
Tour de France	Did not contest during his career						
Vuelta a España	—	—	159	—	—	—	—

Legend
—	Did not compete
DNF	Did not finish
