= Andrea Manfredi =

Italian cyclist (1992–2018)

Personal information
- Full name: Andrea Manfredi
- Born: 10 February 1992 Massa, Italy
- Died: 29 October 2018 (aged 26) Java Sea, Indonesia

Cycling career
- Sport: Cycling
- Discipline: Road
- Role: Rider

Amateur teams
- 2011–2012: Hopplà–Truck Italia–Mavo Infissi–Valdarno Project
- 2016: Team Palazzago

Professional teams
- 2013: Ceramica Flaminia–Fondriest
- 2014–2015: Bardiani–CSF

Andrea Manfredi (10 February 1992 – 29 October 2018) was an Italian cyclist who competed professionally from 2013 to 2015. The last team he rode for prior to his death was the amateur team Palazzago in 2016. Prior to that, Manfredi was a professional rider with the team Bardiani–CSF.

== Death ==
Manfredi was one of the passengers out of the 189 people on board Lion Air Flight 610, all of whom were killed when it crashed into the Java Sea shortly after takeoff.

== Major results ==
2012
3rd Overall Giro della Valle d'Aosta

1st Stage 2

2013
5th Overall Giro della Regione Friuli Venezia Giulia
