= Darren Lapthorne =

Australian racing cyclist

Personal information
- Full name: Darren Lapthorne
- Born: 4 March 1983 (age 43) Melbourne, Australia
- Height: 1.81 m (5 ft 11 in)
- Weight: 68 kg (150 lb)

Cycling career
- Sport: Cycling
- Current team: Retired
- Discipline: Road
- Role: Rider

Amateur team
- 2005: MG Xpower–BigPond

Professional teams
- 2006–2007: Drapac–Porsche
- 2008: Sparkasse
- 2009–2010: Rapha Condor
- 2011–2015: Drapac Professional Cycling

Major wins
- National Road Race Championships (2007)

Darren Lapthorne (born 4 March 1983) is an Australian former professional racing cyclist.

== Career ==
Born in Melbourne, Lapthorne began his career in 2006 with the Australian Professional Team Drapac–Porsche. In his first year, he won the road race of the Teams Road Championships. He also finished third in one stage of the Herald Sun Tour. In January 2007 he achieved his greatest success by winning the Australian National Road Race Championships. He rode for the German Team Sparkasse in 2008 and for British team Rapha Condor in 2009.

He retired from professional racing in 2016.

== Personal life ==
In December 2008, Lapthorne returned to competition after 2 months out following the much-publicised 18 September 2008 disappearance and death of his younger sister, Britt (born 1987), while she was backpacking in Dubrovnik, Croatia. During this time, Lapthorne was heavily involved in the early informal efforts to identify her whereabouts, and for helping to expose the lack of attention given to the case by local police. In late 2008, he assisted in the repatriation of her remains to Australia and also attended the subsequent state coroner's hearing in 2015.

== Major results ==
2005
1st Stage 9 Tour of the Murray River
2006
1st Stage 7 Tour de Korea
1st Stage 4 Tour of Gippsland
2007
1st Road race, National Road Championships
1st Overall De Bortoli Tour

1st Stages 1a & 2

1st Melle
1st Stage 1b Tour of the Southern Grampians
1st Stage 1 Mersey Valley Tour
2nd Overall Tour de Hokkaido

1st Stage 5

2008
1st Stage 5 Geelong Bay Classic Series, Geelong
2009
1st Stage 2 Tour de Beauce
2010
2nd Ryedale Grand Prix
2013
8th Overall Tour of Japan
10th Overall Tour of Hainan
2014
3rd Overall Tour d'Azerbaïdjan
