= Dennis van Niekerk =

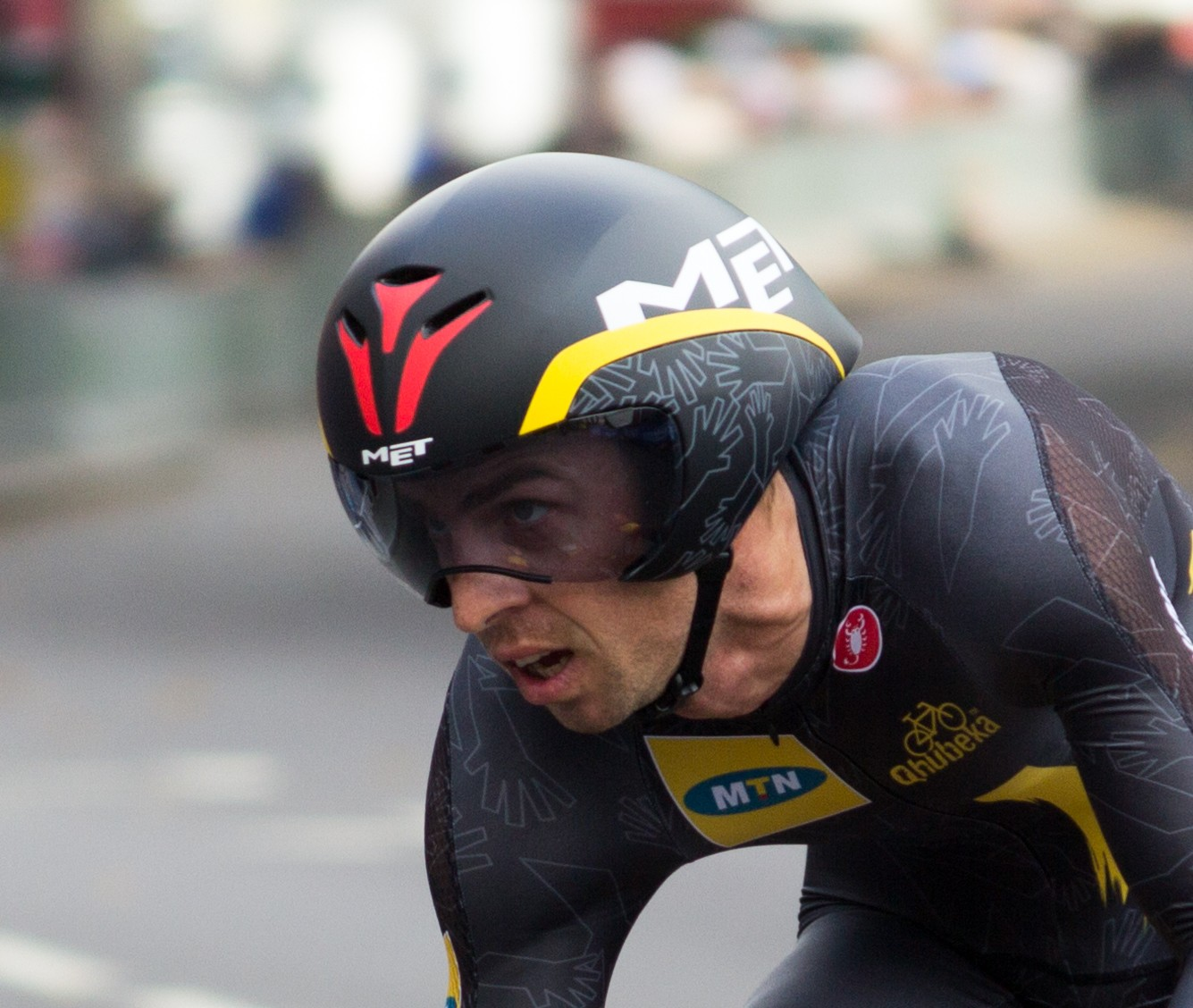

Personal information
- Born: 19 October 1984 (age 41) Kroonstad, South Korea

Cycling career
- Sport: Cycling
- Discipline: Road
- Role: Rider

Professional teams
- 2005: Exel
- 2007–2009: Team Konica Minolta
- 2011–2014: MTN–Qhubeka

Dennis van Niekerk (born 19 October 1984 in Kroonstad) is a South African cyclist.

== Major results ==
2009
3rd Giro del Capo III
2013
1st Stage 5 Tour de Korea (TTT)
