= Alexsandr Dyachenko =

Kazakh road bicycle racer

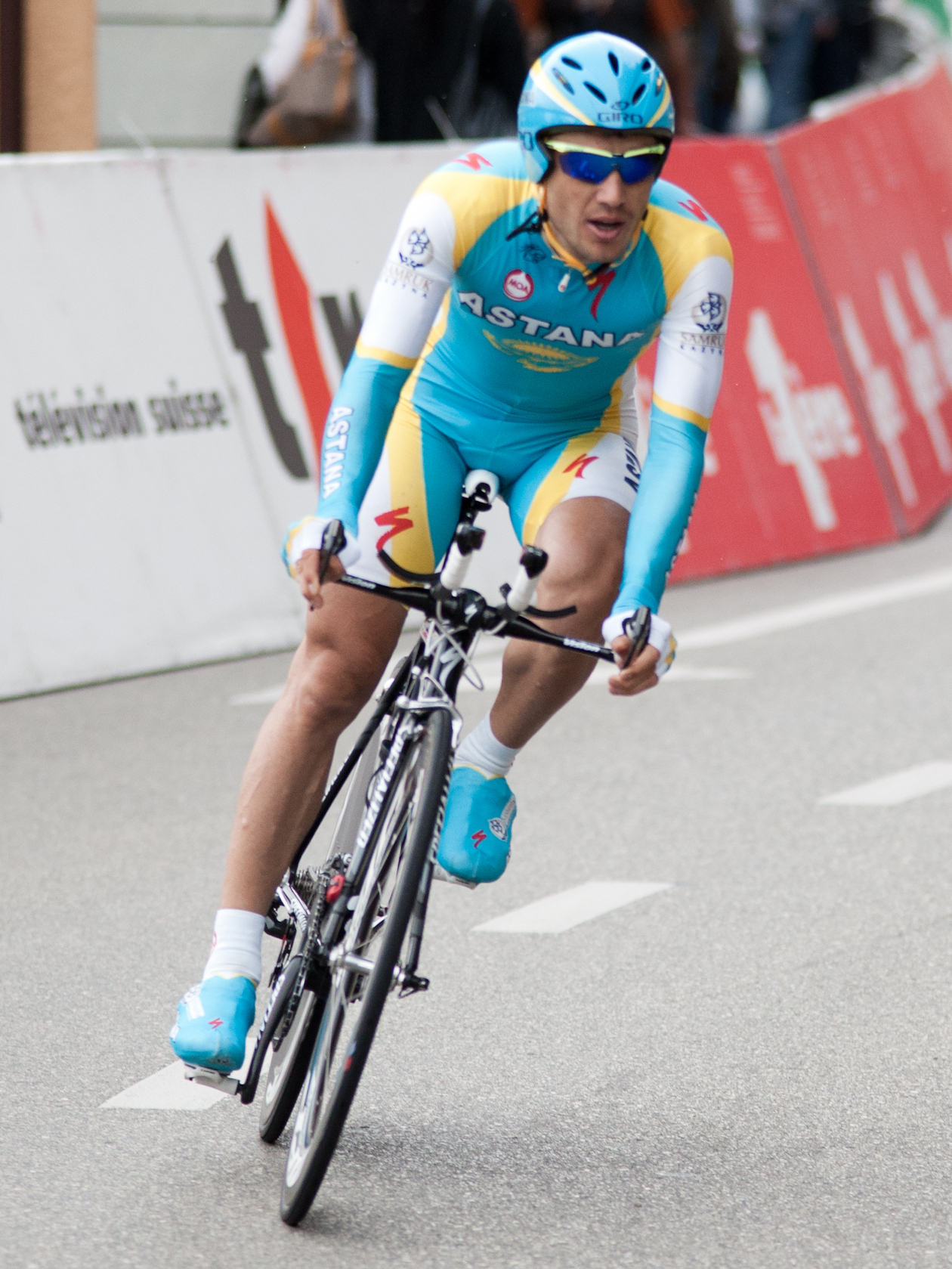
- Dyachenko at the 2010 Tour de Romandie

Personal information
- Full name: Alexsandr Dyachenko
- Born: 17 October 1983 (age 42)
- Height: 1.75 m (5 ft 9 in)
- Weight: 69 kg (152 lb)

Cycling career
- Sport: Cycling
- Current team: Retired
- Discipline: Road
- Role: Rider

Professional teams
- 2004–2006: Capec
- 2008: Ulan
- 2009–2015: Astana

Major wins
- Stage races Presidential Cycling Tour of Turkey (2012) Single-day races and Classics National Time Trial Championships (2007) National Road Race Championships (2013)

Alexsandr Dyachenko (born 17 October 1983) is a Kazakh former professional road bicycle racer, who rode professionally from 2004 to 2006 and 2008 to 2015, for the Capec, Ulan and Astana teams.

In 2012, Dyachenko put in a solid performance at the Tour of Turkey, where he finished second overall, but the original winner Ivailo Gabrovski tested positive for erythropoietin (EPO). In October, it was announced that Gabrovski was stripped of the title, which went to Dyachenko.

== Major results ==
2005
9th Overall Tour of Greece
10th Overall Tour of Japan
2006
5th Overall Tour of Japan
6th Overall Tour of Hainan
8th Overall Tour of Greece
2007
1st Time trial, National Road Championships
3rd Overall Tour of Japan

1st Mountains classification

6th Overall Tour de l'Ain
10th Overall Tour of Bulgaria

1st Stage 4

10th Overall Tour of Hainan
2008
2nd Trofeo Città di Castelfidardo
6th Overall Okolo Slovenska
6th GP Capodarco
9th Ruota d'Oro
10th Overall Tour of Hainan
2009
7th Overall Volta a Catalunya
2011
3rd Time trial, National Road Championships
9th Time trial, UCI Road World Championships
10th Overall Tour of Hainan
2012
1st Overall Tour of Turkey

1st Stage 3

4th Overall Tour de Langkawi
5th Overall Tour of Austria
2013
National Road Championships

1st Road race
2nd Time trial

2nd Overall Tour of Austria
2014
6th Overall Tour of Hainan

=== Grand Tour general classification results timeline ===
Grand Tour	2010	2011	2012
Giro d'Italia	DNF	111	119
Tour de France	—	—	—
Vuelta a España	32	102	137

Legend
—	Did not compete
DNF	Did not finish
