= Adam Phelan =

Australian cyclist

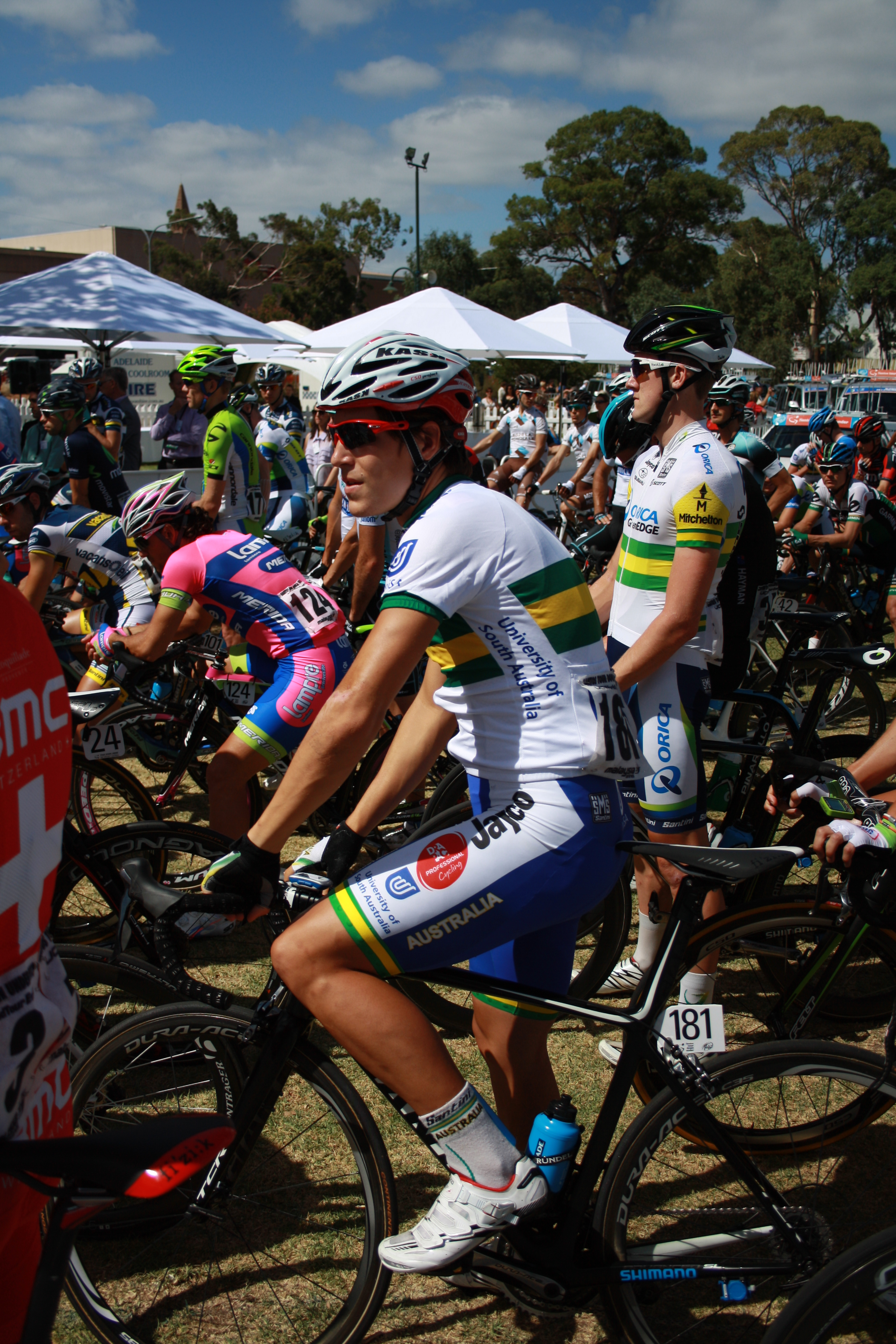
- Phelan at the 2013 Tour Down Under

Personal information
- Born: 23 August 1991 (age 35) Canberra, Australia

Cycling career
- Sport: Cycling
- Current team: Retired
- Discipline: Road
- Role: Rider

Professional team
- 2011–2016: Drapac Professional Cycling

Adam Phelan (born 23 August 1991) is an Australian former professional racing cyclist who rode professionally between 2011 and 2016. He represented Australia at the under 23 UCI World Road Race Championships in 2013 (Italy) and 2012 (the Netherlands). He won the 37th Gran Premio di Poggiana and the prologue in the 2011 Tour de Taiwan. Other notable results include 2nd place in stages of the Tour de Langkawi and Tour of Japan, as well as runner-up in the 2013 Gran Premio della Liberazione.
