= Floris Goesinnen =

Dutch cyclist

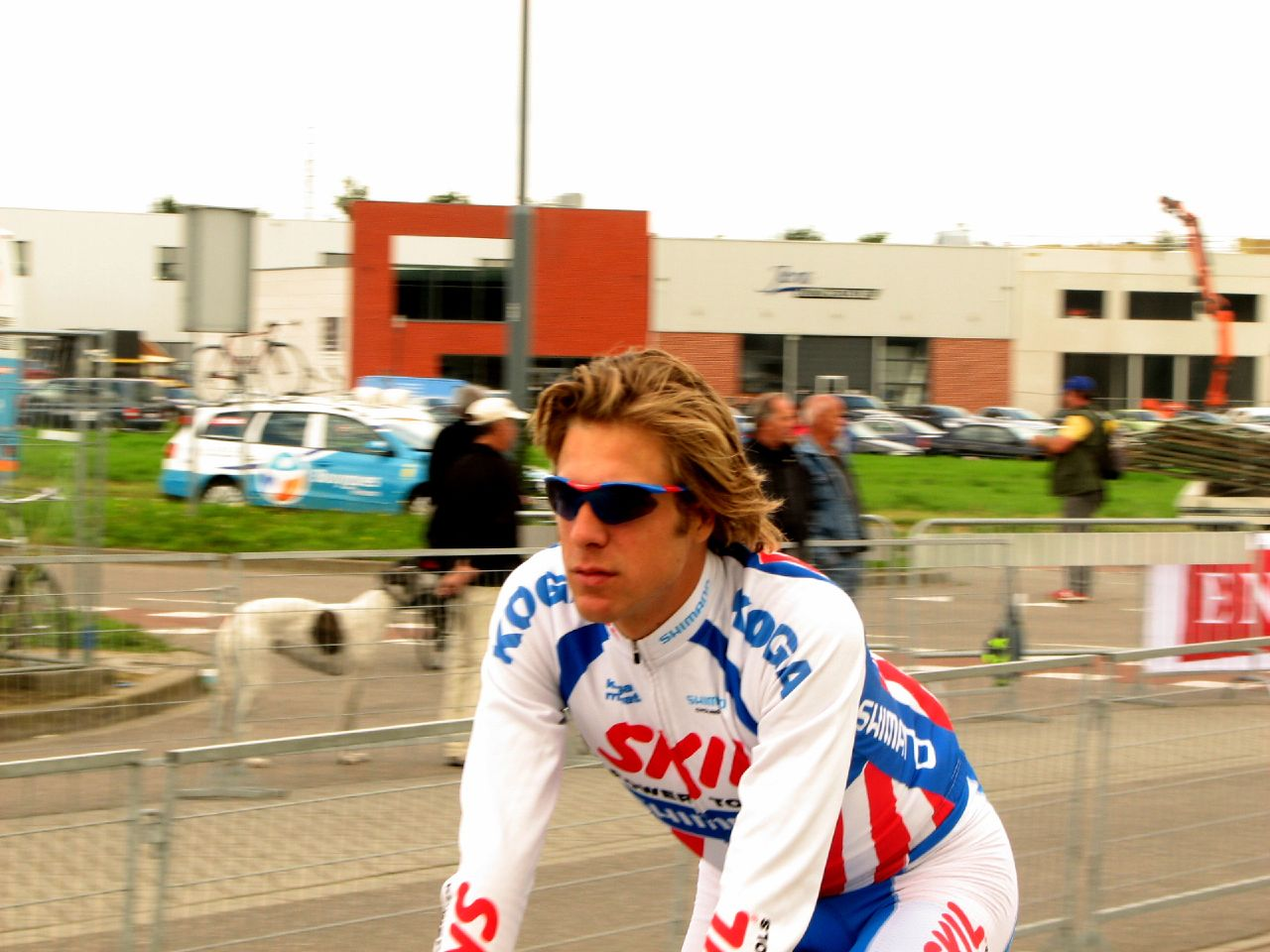

Personal information
- Nickname: Flogo
- Born: 30 October 1983 (age 42) Opperdoes, Netherlands

Cycling career
- Sport: Cycling
- Discipline: Road
- Role: Rider

Professional teams
- 2004–2005: Team Moser–AH.nl
- 2006: Van Vliet–EBH Advocaten
- 2006–2010: Skil–Shimano
- 2011–2014: Drapac Professional Cycling

Floris Goesinnen (born 30 October 1983 in Opperdoes) is a Dutch former professional road cyclist.

== Major results ==
2006
2nd Ronde van Drenthe
5th Hel van het Mergelland
2007
1st Nationale Sluitingsprijs
2008
1st Stage 1 Tour de l'Ain
1st Stage 1b (TTT) Brixia Tour
5th Grand Prix d'Isbergues
2009
5th Halle–Ingooigem
2010
7th Druivenkoers-Overijse
2011
1st Stage 4 Tour de Taiwan
3rd Internationale Wielertrofee Jong Maar Moedig
4th Road race, National Road Championships
8th Overall Rás Tailteann
9th Ocbc Cycle Classic Singapore
2012
1st Stage 2 Flèche du Sud
2nd Overall Tour of Taihu Lake
8th Overall New Zealand Cycle Classic
