= Andrea Piechele =

Italian cyclist

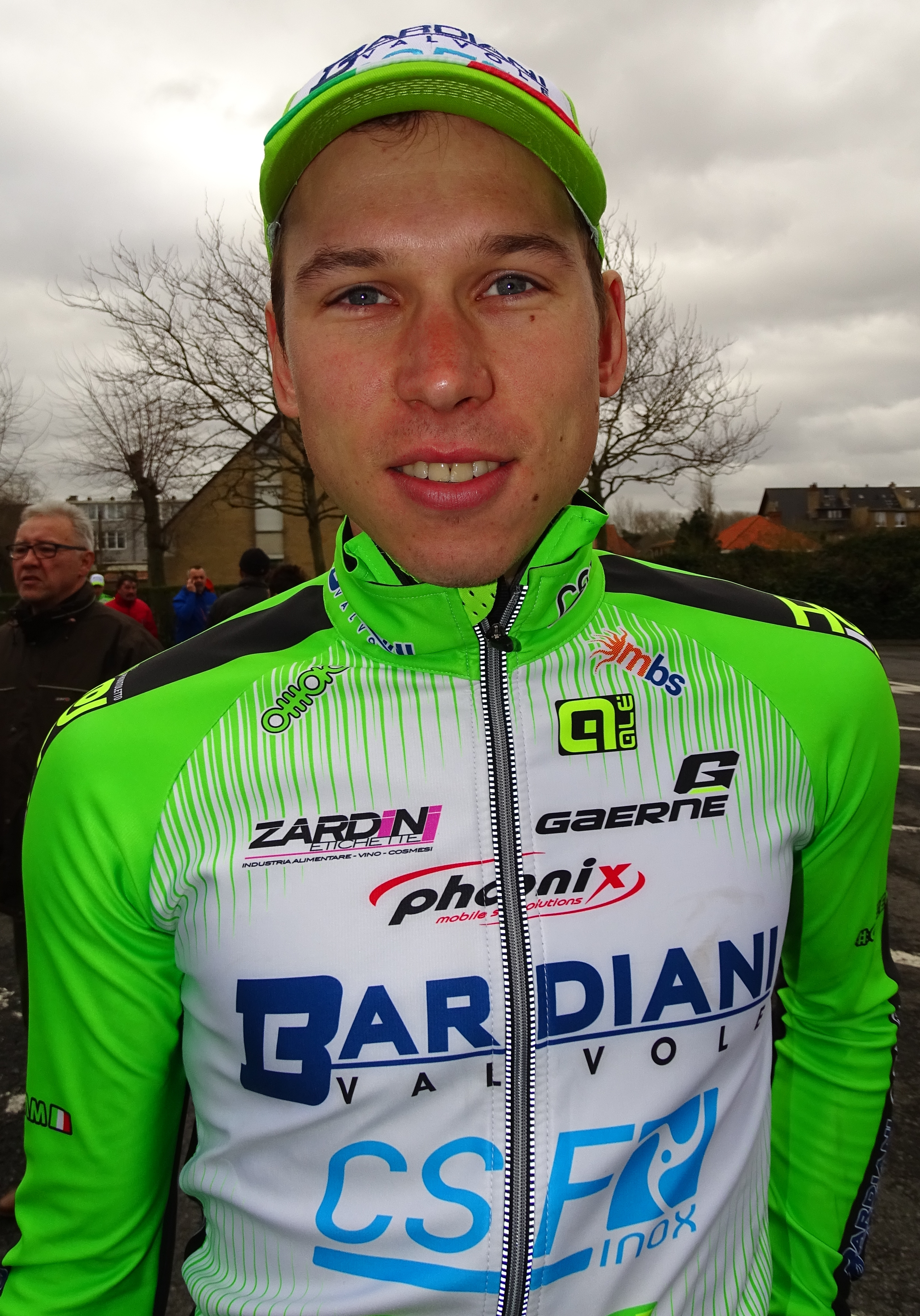
- Piechele in 2015

Personal information
- Full name: Andrea Piechele
- Born: 29 June 1987 (age 39) Cles, Italy

Cycling career
- Sport: Cycling
- Current team: Retired
- Discipline: Road
- Role: Rider

Amateur teams
- 2007–2009: U.C. Trevigiani–Dynamon
- 2008: Team Columbia (stagiaire)

Professional teams
- 2010: Carmiooro NGC
- 2011–2012: Colnago–CSF Inox
- 2013: Ceramica Flaminia–Fondriest
- 2014–2015: Bardiani–CSF

Andrea Piechele (born 29 June 1987 in Cles) is an Italian former professional cyclist, who competed professionally between 2010 and 2015.

== Major results ==
2008
Giro del Friuli-Venezia Giulia

1st Points classification
1st Stage 2

10th Trofeo Banca Popolare di Vicenza
2009
2nd Giro del Medio Brenta
3rd Trofeo Banca Popolare di Vicenza
2010
2nd Circuito de Getxo
6th Ronde van Drenthe
9th Gran Premio della Costa Etruschi
10th Cholet-Pays de Loire
2011
8th Gran Premio Industria e Commercio Artigianato Carnaghese
2013
3rd Memorial Marco Pantani
3rd Tour du Jura
4th Coppa Bernocchi
2014
6th Coppa Ugo Agostoni
7th Tour of Almaty
9th Châteauroux Classic
