= Paolo Colonna =

Italian cyclist

Personal information
- Full name: Paolo Colonna
- Born: March 24, 1987 (age 39) Altamura, Italy

Cycling career
- Sport: Cycling
- Current team: Retired
- Discipline: Road
- Role: Rider

Amateur teams
- 2011: Team Idea
- 2012–2013: Team Colpack

Professional team
- 2014: Bardiani–CSF

Paolo Colonna (born March 24, 1987) is an Italian former professional cyclist.

== Major results ==
2013
1st Road race, National Amateur Road Championships
1st Stage 3 Giro del Friuli Venezia Giulia
2nd Gran Premio San Giuseppe
