= Donato De Ieso =

Italian cyclist (born 1989)

Personal information
- Full name: Donato De Ieso
- Born: 27 February 1989 (age 37) Pago Veiano

Cycling career
- Sport: Cycling
- Discipline: Road
- Role: Rider

Amateur team
- 2009–2012: Vejus–TMF–R.Novara-BH Bikes

Professional team
- 2013–2014: Bardiani Valvole–CSF Inox

Donato De Ieso (born 27 February 1989 in Pago Veiano) is an Italian former cyclist, who rode professionally in 2013 and 2014, exclusively for the Bardiani–CSF team.

== Palmarès ==
2011
Coppa San Sabino
Trophée Rigoberto Lamonica
2012
Trophée Salvatore Morucci
