= Christian Delle Stelle =

Italian cyclist

Personal information
- Full name: Christian Delle Stelle
- Born: 4 February 1989 (age 37) Cuggiono, Italy

Cycling career
- Sport: Cycling
- Discipline: Road
- Role: Rider

Amateur teams
- 2007: Biringhello Piemonte My Hotels
- 2008–2009: Filmop Sorelle Ramonda Bottoli
- 2010–2011: U.C. Trevigiani–Dynamon–Bottoli

Professional teams
- 2011–2013: Colnago–CSF Inox
- 2014: Team Idea
- 2014: MG Kvis–Trevigiani
- 2015: CCC–Sprandi–Polkowice

Christian Delle Stelle (born 4 February 1989) is an Italian former professional racing cyclist.

== Major results ==
2009
1st Giro del Medio Brenta
2011
2nd Circuito del Porto
2013
8th RideLondon–Surrey Classic
2014
1st GP Izola
1st Trofeo Franco Balestra
Okolo Slovenska

1st Points classification
1st Stage 4

2nd Gran Premio Nobili Rubinetterie
2nd Grand Prix Sarajevo
2015
10th Münsterland Giro
