= Stefano Locatelli =

Italian cyclist

Personal information
- Full name: Stefano Locatelli
- Born: 26 February 1989 (age 37) Bergamo, Italy
- Height: 1.76 m (5 ft 9 in)
- Weight: 60 kg (132 lb)

Cycling career
- Sport: Cycling
- Current team: Retired
- Discipline: Road
- Role: Rider
- Rider type: Climber

Amateur team
- 2009–2011: U.C. Bergamasca 1902–De Nardi–Colpack

Professional team
- 2012–2014: Colnago–CSF Bardiani

Stefano Locatelli (born 26 February 1989 in Bergamo) is an Italian former racing cyclist.

== Major results ==
2009
1st Gran Premio Palio del Recioto
2nd Cronoscalata Gardone Val Trompia-Prati di Caregno
2010
2nd GP Capodarco
5th Overall Girobio
2012
6th Overall Tour de Langkawi
6th GP Industria e Commercio Artigianato Carnaghese
2013
9th Overall Giro del Trentino

=== Grand Tour general classification results timeline ===
Grand Tour	2012	2013
Giro d'Italia	DNF	102
Tour de France	—	—
Vuelta a España	—	—

Legend
—	Did not compete
DNF	Did not finish
