= Radoslav Rogina =

Croatian road bicycle racer

Personal information
- Full name: Radoslav Rogina
- Born: 3 March 1979 (age 47) Varaždin, SFR Yugoslavia (now Croatia)

Cycling career
- Sport: Cycling
- Current team: Retired
- Discipline: Road
- Role: Rider

Amateur team
- 2000–2001: KRKA–Telekom Slovenije

Professional teams
- 2002–2003: Perutnina Ptuj–KRKA–Telekom Slovenije
- 2004–2005: Tenax
- 2006–2008: Perutnina Ptuj
- 2009–2011: Loborika
- 2012–2020: Adria Mobil

Major wins
- Stage races Tour of Slovenia (2013) Sibiu Cycling Tour (2014) Tour of Qinghai Lake (2015) Single-day races and Classics National Road Race Championships (2003, 2009, 2010, 2014, 2016) National Time Trial Championships (2003)

Radoslav Rogina (born 3 March 1979) is a Croatian former professional road bicycle racer, who rode professionally between 2002 and 2020, for the Tenax, Perutnina Ptuj, Loborika and Adria Mobil teams. Rogina represented Croatia at the 2008 Summer Olympics when he finished 25th in the road race event. He represented Croatia again at the 2012 Summer Olympics in London finishing 41st in road race.

== Major results ==
1999
2nd Road race, National Road Championships
2000
3rd Time trial, National Road Championships
4th Poreč Trophy
2001
2nd Road race, National Road Championships
3rd Overall GP Kranj

1st Stage 2

8th Poreč Trophy
2002
National Road Championships

2nd Time trial
3rd Road race

6th Overall Tour de Normandie
6th Poreč Trophy
9th Gran Premio della Costa Etruschi
2003
National Road Championships

1st Road race
1st Time trial

1st Overall The Paths of King Nikola

1st Stages 1 & 3

1st GP Istria 3
2nd Overall Tour de l'Avenir
2nd Poreč Trophy
3rd Overall Istrian Spring Trophy
10th Overall Tour of Slovenia
10th Overall Tour of Austria
10th GP Istria 2
2004
National Road Championships

2nd Road race
2nd Time trial

6th Giro del Medio Brenta
2005
2nd Road race, National Road Championships
3rd Overall Tour of Slovenia
2006
1st Overall The Paths of King Nikola

1st Points classification
1st Mountains classification
1st Stage 3

3rd GP Hydraulika Mikolasek
3rd Grand Prix Kooperativa
6th Overall Tour of Slovenia
7th Giro d'Oro
7th Rund um die Hainleite
9th Overall Vuelta a Cuba
2007
1st Overall Tour of Croatia
1st GP Triberg-Schwarzwald
2nd Road race, National Road Championships
2nd Overall Tour de Serbie

1st Stage 2

2nd Memorijal Nevio Valčić
2nd Beograd–Čačak
3rd Overall Paris–Corrèze
4th Overall Tour du Loir-et-Cher
4th Overall Okolo Slovenska
5th Overall Szlakiem Grodów Piastowskich
7th Overall The Paths of King Nikola
10th GP Kranj
2008
2nd Overall Tour de Serbie

1st Stages 2 & 4

3rd Overall Istrian Spring Trophy
3rd Overall Rhône-Alpes Isère Tour
3rd Memorijal Stjepan Grgac
4th Overall The Paths of King Nikola
4th Overall Tour of Slovenia

1st Stage 2

8th GP Ljubljana–Zagreb
2009
1st Road race, National Road Championships
1st Overall The Paths of King Nikola

1st Stage 1

1st Trofeo Internazionale Bastianelli
2nd Memorijal Stjepan Grgac
3rd Overall Istrian Spring Trophy
4th Overall Tour of Qinghai Lake
4th Memorijal Nevio Valčić
5th GP Folignano
2010
1st Road race, National Road Championships
2nd Overall Tour of Qinghai Lake

1st Stage 1

2nd Poreč Trophy
3rd Overall Istrian Spring Trophy

1st Stage 3

3rd Overall Tour du Maroc

1st Stage 2

4th GP Folignano
4th GP Betonexpressz 2000
4th Memorijal Stjepan Grgac
6th Overall Rhône-Alpes Isère Tour
6th Trofeo Zsšdi
8th GP Ljubljana–Zagreb
2011
1st Memorijal Stjepan Grgac
2nd Overall Istrian Spring Trophy
2nd Overall Tour of Slovenia
3rd Belgrade–Banja Luka I
3rd GP Judendorf Straßenengel
4th Trofeo Zsšdi
4th Trofeo Internazionale Bastianelli
5th Poreč Trophy
5th Tour of Vojvodina I
6th Overall Circuit des Ardennes
9th Tour of Vojvodina II
10th Central European Tour Budapest GP
10th GP Ljubljana–Zagreb
2012
5th Belgrade–Banja Luka I
5th Belgrade–Banja Luka II
8th Giro dell'Appennino
10th Overall Szlakiem Grodów Piastowskich

1st Mountains classification
1st Stage 4

2013
1st Overall Tour of Slovenia

1st Mountains classification
1st Stage 3

1st GP Sencur
2nd Road race, National Road Championships
2nd Overall Istrian Spring Trophy
2nd Overall Settimana Ciclistica Lombarda
2nd Raiffeisen Grand Prix
4th Grand Prix Südkärnten
5th Central European Tour Košice–Miskolc
6th GP Kranj
7th Croatia–Slovenia
8th Giro dell'Appennino
2014
1st Road race, National Road Championships
1st Overall Sibiu Cycling Tour

1st Points classification
1st Stage 1

1st GP Judendorf-Strassengel
4th Overall Tour d'Azerbaïdjan
8th Overall Tour of Al Zubarah
10th Overall Okolo Slovenska
2015
1st Overall Tour of Qinghai Lake
6th Overall Tour of Slovenia
2016
1st Road race, National Road Championships
2nd GP Kranj
4th GP Izola
5th Overall Tour of Croatia
9th Croatia–Slovenia
10th Overall Tour of Małopolska
2017
5th Overall Tour of Qinghai Lake
9th Overall Okolo Jižních Čech
10th Overall Szlakiem Grodów Piastowskich
2018
3rd Overall Tour of Qinghai Lake
4th Overall Tour of Croatia
5th Overall Rhône-Alpes Isère Tour
7th Overall Istrian Spring Trophy
2019
2nd Road race, National Road Championships
3rd Overall Sibiu Cycling Tour
4th Overall Tour of Bihor
7th Overall Tour of Antalya
10th Overall CRO Race
