= Kristjan Fajt =

Slovenian cyclist (born 1982)

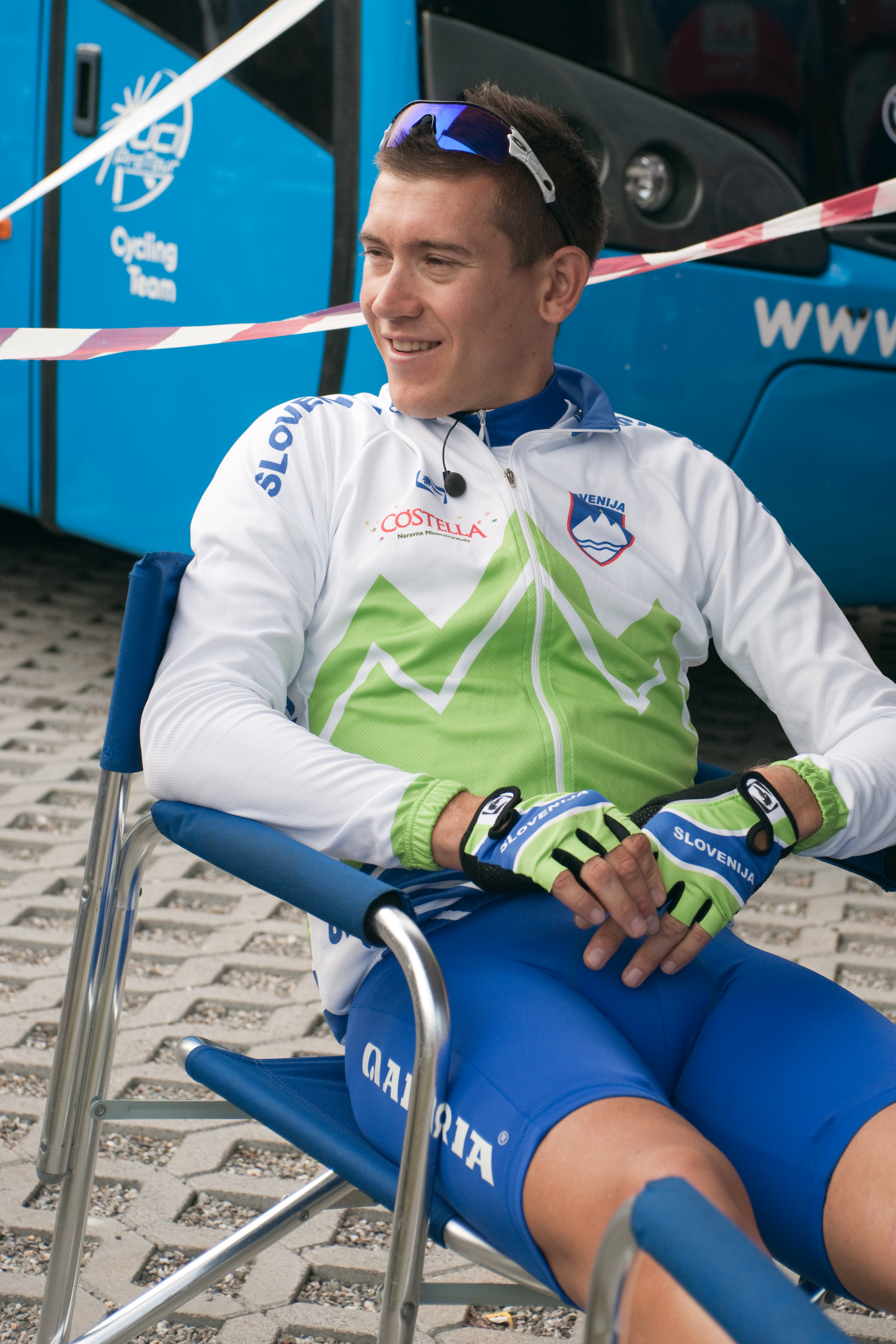
- Fajt in 2009

Personal information
- Full name: Kristjan Fajt
- Born: 7 May 1982 (age 44) Koper, SFR Yugoslavia (now Slovenia)

Cycling career
- Sport: Cycling
- Discipline: Road
- Role: Rider

Amateur team
- 2004–2005: Team Tenex

Professional teams
- 2006–2007: Radenska–PowerBar
- 2008: Perutnina Ptuj
- 2009–2016: Adria Mobil

Kristjan Fajt (born 7 May 1982) is a Slovenian racing cyclist, who last rode for UCI Continental team Adria Mobil. His only professional win to date came at the 2008 Tour of Qinghai Lake. He rode for Slovenia at the 2014 UCI Road World Championships.

In March 2016, Fajt recorded a positive test for erythropoietin (EPO) at the Istrian Spring Trophy. He was later given a 45-month ban in October 2016 backdated to March, with his ban expiring in January 2020.

== Major results ==
2002
3rd Overall GP Kranj
9th Road race, UEC European Under-23 Road Championships
2003
1st Overall Giro delle Regioni

1st Stage 2

3rd Road race, UEC European Under-23 Road Championships
4th Gran Premio Palio del Recioto
6th Giro del Belvedere
2004
7th Overall Giro d'Abruzzo
2006
1st Time trial, National Road Championships
4th Trofeo Internazionale Bastianelli
4th Tour of Vojvodina
8th Overall Giro del Friuli-Venezia Giulia
8th Ruota d'Oro
10th Poreč Trophy
10th Grand Prix Kooperativa
2007
1st Grand Prix Kooperativa
4th Overall The Paths of King Nikola
5th Belgrade–Banja Luka I
10th Belgrade–Banja Luka II
2008
1st Stage 3 Tour of Qinghai Lake
2nd Overall The Paths of King Nikola

1st Stage 3

2nd Schaal Sels
3rd Tour of Vojvodina I
10th Ljubljana–Zagreb
2009
3rd Zagreb–Ljubljana
6th Overall Circuit des Ardennes
7th Prague–Karlovy Vary–Prague
2010
8th Gran Premio di Lugano
2011
1st Ljubljana–Zagreb
3rd Coupe des Carpathes
2012
1st Tour of Vojvodina I
2nd Tour of Vojvodina II
3rd Time trial, National Road Championships
6th Banja Luka–Belgrade II
2013
National Road Championships

3rd Time trial
5th Road race

3rd Overall Tour of Al Zubarah
3rd GP Kranj
5th Raiffeisen Grand Prix
2014
2nd Overall Okolo Slovenska
2nd Overall Tour of Al Zubarah
3rd Road race, National Road Championships
4th Tour Bohemia
2015
2nd Road race, National Road Championships
4th Belgrade–Banja Luka II

== See also ==
- List of doping cases in cycling
