= Jure Kocjan =

Slovenian road bicycle racer

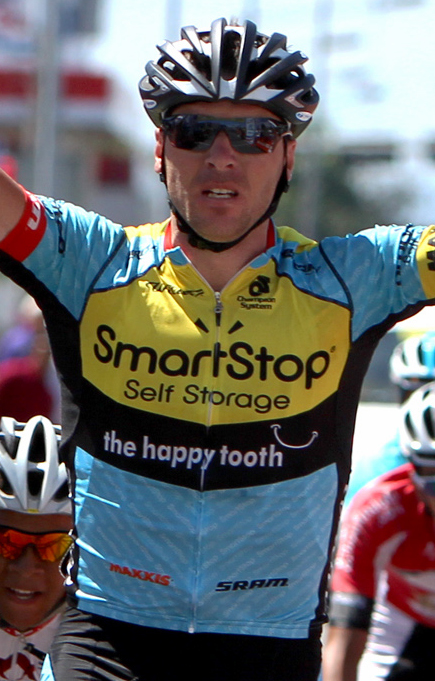
- Kocjan in 2014

Personal information
- Full name: Jure Kocjan
- Born: 18 October 1984 (age 41): Jesenice, Municipality of Jesenice, Yugoslavia; (now Slovenia)

Cycling career
- Sport: Cycling
- Current team: Retired
- Discipline: Road
- Role: Rider
- Rider type: Sprinter

Professional teams
- 2005–2007: Radenska–Rog
- 2008: Perutnina Ptuj
- 2009–2010: Carmiooro A Style
- 2011–2012: Team Type 1–Sanofi Aventis
- 2013: Euskaltel–Euskadi
- 2014–2015: Team SmartStop
- 2016: Lupus Racing Team

Major wins
- Grand Prix Pino Cerami (2010)

Jure Kocjan (born 18 October 1984) is a Slovenian former professional road racing cyclist, who rode professionally between 2005 and 2016.

== Career ==
Born in Jesenice, Kocjan represented Slovenia in the Men's road race at the 2010 UCI Road World Championships. His first notable win came at the 2008 Vuelta a Cuba.

Kocjan joined Team SmartStop for the 2014 season, after his previous team – Euskaltel–Euskadi – folded at the end of the 2013 season.

He signed for the Lupus Racing Team for 2016, but following a retest in early 2016 of a sample from 2012 he was provisionally suspended by the UCI and fired by the team. He was subsequently given a four year ban by the UCI, with his ban expiring in January 2020.

== Major results ==
2004
8th GP Kranj
2005
1st Stage 1 Jadranska Magistrala
7th Trofeo Zsšdi
2006
1st Tour of Vojvodina
2nd Trofeo Internazionale Bastianelli
2nd Trofeo Gianfranco Bianchin
2nd GP Kooperativa
4th Giro del Mendrisiotto
4th Gran Premio Palio del Recioto
6th GP Kranj
7th Trofeo Zsšdi
2007
2nd Belgrade–Banja Luka II
3rd Trofeo Zsšdi
2008
Vuelta a Cuba

1st Stages 2 & 6

2nd GP Kranj
2nd Rund um die Nürnberger Altstadt
4th Neuseen Classics
8th Overall Tour of Qinghai Lake

1st Stage 8

8th Tour de Rijke
2009
2nd Road race, National Road Championships
2nd Overall Étoile de Bessèges

1st Stage 3

5th Overall Tour of Qinghai Lake

1st Stages 3 & 8

7th GP Kranj
7th Gran Premio Industria e Commercio Artigianato Carnaghese
8th Gran Premio Città di Camaiore
10th Cholet-Pays de Loire
2010
1st Grand Prix Pino Cerami
2nd Gran Premio di Lugano
4th Gran Premio Industria e Commercio Artigianato Carnaghese
5th Neuseen Classics
7th Rund um Köln
7th Trofeo Laigueglia
10th Giro del Friuli
2011
2nd Flèche d'Emeraude
2nd Gran Premio dell'Insubria-Lugano
4th GP Kranj
4th Montepaschi Strade Bianche
4th Gran Premio di Lugano
4th Grand Prix d'Ouverture La Marseillaise
5th Philadelphia International Championship
6th Overall Tour du Limousin
6th Gran Premio Industria e Commercio Artigianato Carnaghese
2012
~~Tour du Limousin~~

~~1st Stages 1 & 3~~

~~7th Gran Premio Città di Camaiore~~
~~8th Flèche d'Emeraude~~
~~10th Route Adélie~~
2014
1st Overall Grand Prix Cycliste de Saguenay

1st Points classification
1st Stage 4

~~Vuelta a la Independencia Nacional~~

~~1st Stages 3 & 6a~~

1st Sprints classification Tour of Utah
2nd Philadelphia International Championship
2015
1st Stage 2 Tour of Utah
2nd Winston-Salem Cycling Classic
