= Gregor Gazvoda =

Slovenian cyclist

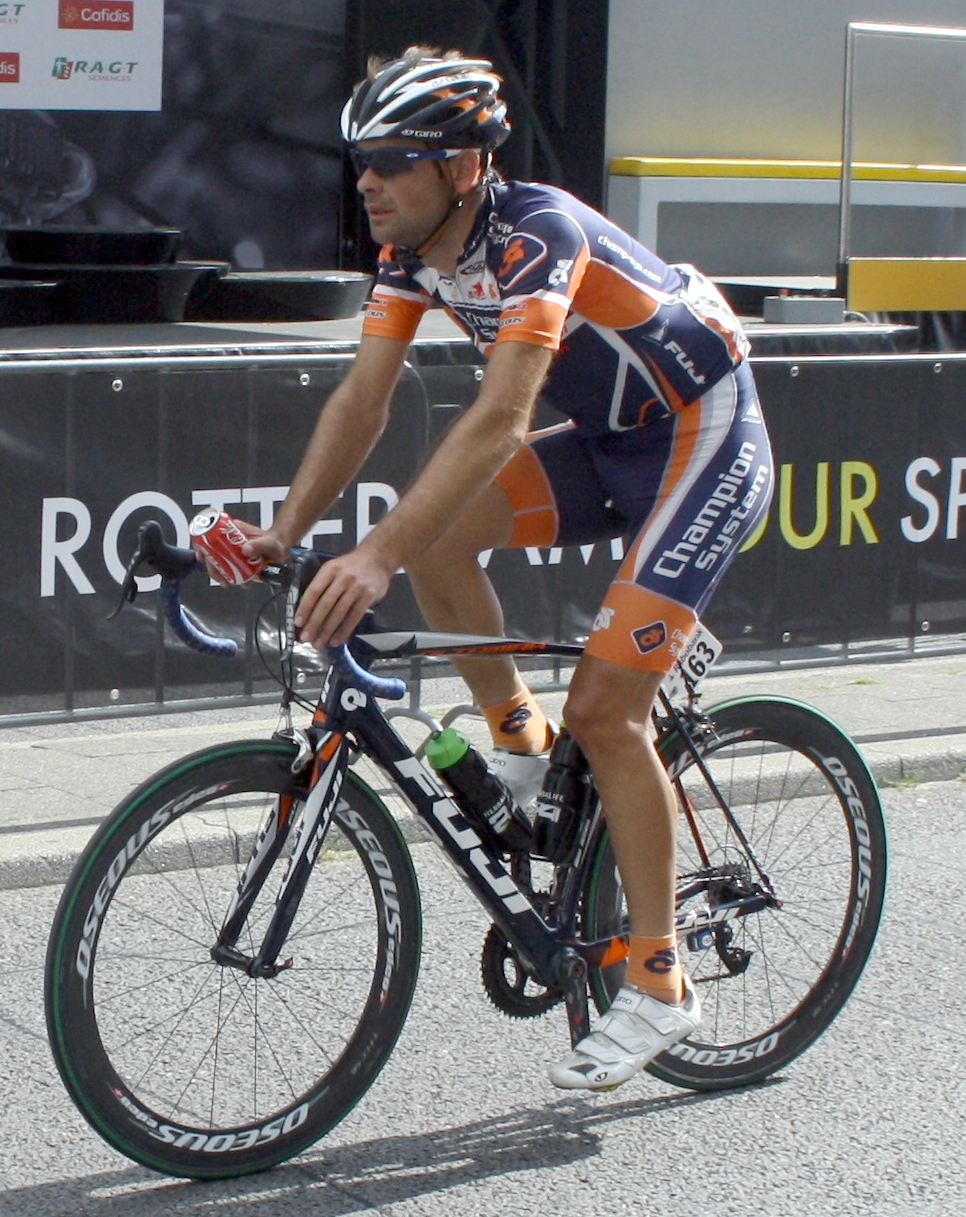
- Gazvoda at the 2013 World Ports Classic.

Personal information
- Full name: Gregor Gazvoda
- Nickname: Grega
- Born: 15 October 1981 (age 45) Maribor, Yugoslavia
- Height: 1.87 m (6 ft 2 in)
- Weight: 72 kg (159 lb)

Cycling career
- Sport: Cycling
- Current team: Tirol KTM Cycling Team
- Discipline: Road
- Role: Rider (retired); Directeur sportif

Amateur team
- 2000–2003: KRKA–Telekom Slovenije

Professional teams
- 2004–2008: Perutnina Ptuj
- 2009: EQA–Meitan Hompo–Graphite Design
- 2010: Arbö KTM–Gebrüder Weiss
- 2011: Perutnina Ptuj
- 2012: Ag2r–La Mondiale
- 2013: Champion System
- 2014: Gebrüder Weiss–Oberndorfer
- 2015–2016: Kinan Cycling Team
- 2017–2018: Adria Mobil

Managerial team
- 2019–: Tirol KTM Cycling Team

Major wins
- Tour of Qinghai Lake (2011); National Time Trial Championships (2005, 2008, 2010, 2014)

Gregor Gazvoda (born 15 October 1981) is a Slovenian former professional racing cyclist, who currently works as a directeur sportif for UCI Continental team Tirol KTM Cycling Team.

== Career ==
After racing for Perutnina Ptuj at Continental level for four years – the team folded in 2008 – he raced for the Japanese team Meitan-Hompo and then joined Perutnina Ptuj again as the team was re-established. He was the first Slovenian cyclist to win a 2.HC race at Tour of Qinghai Lake. It was the points he gathered at the UCI Asia Tour that helped him get a contract with a UCI ProTour team for 2012.

Gazvoda rejoined Gebrüder Weiss–Oberndorfer for the 2014 season, after his previous team – Champion System – folded at the end of the 2013 season.

== Major results ==
2002
8th Overall Olympia's Tour

1st Stage 8 (ITT)

8th Overall Grand Prix Guillaume Tell
9th Time trial, UCI Under-23 Road World Championships
2004
2nd Time trial, National Road Championships
2005
National Road Championships

1st Time trial
2nd Road race

1st Stage 7 Vuelta a Cuba
2007
2nd Time trial, National Road Championships
3rd Overall Course de Solidarność et des Champions Olympiques
9th Chrono des Nations
2008
National Road Championships

1st Time trial
3rd Road race

1st Tour of Vojvodina II
1st Stage 4 (ITT) Circuit des Ardennes
6th Chrono des Nations
9th Ljubljana–Zagreb
2009
2nd Time trial, National Road Championships
2010
1st Time trial, National Road Championships
1st Stage 2 Tour of Qinghai Lake
8th Tour of Taihu Lake
2011
1st Overall Tour of Qinghai Lake

1st Stage 3

1st Tour of Vojvodina I
3rd Road race, National Road Championships
6th Banja Luka–Belgrade I
2012
2nd Time trial, National Road Championships
2013
5th Philadelphia International Cycling Classic
2014
1st Time trial, National Road Championships
2017
2nd Time trial, National Road Championships
