= Matej Stare =

Slovenian cyclist

Personal information
- Born: 20 February 1978 (age 48) Kranj, Slovenia

Cycling career
- Sport: Cycling
- Current team: Retired
- Discipline: Road
- Role: Rider

Professional teams
- 2002–2008: Perutnina Ptuj
- 2009–2010: Sava

Matej Stare (born 20 February 1978 in Kranj) is a former Slovenian racing cyclist.

== Palmares ==
2001
1st Stage 4 Tour of Croatia
2004
1st Poreč Trophy
2006
1st Stage 2 The Paths of King Nikola
1st Stage 6 Tour of Morocco
2007
1st Stage 1 The Paths of King Nikola
1st Tour de Serbie

1st Stage 4

1st Stage 4b Okolo Slovenska
2nd Tour of Croatia
2008
1st Stage 12 Vuelta a Cuba
1st Belgrade–Banja Luka II
1st Raiffeisen Grand Prix
6th Tour of Qinghai Lake
2009
1st Stage 3 The Paths of King Nikola
3rd Gran Premio Industrie del Marmo
2010
3rd Poreč Trophy
