= Mitja Mahorič =

Slovenian cyclist

Personal information
- Nicknames: mičo, miki
- Born: May 12, 1976 (age 50) Ptuj, Slovenia
- Height: 184 cm (6 ft 0 in)

Cycling career
- Sport: Cycling
- Discipline: Road
- Role: Rider

Professional teams
- 2002–2008: Perutnina Ptuj-KRKA-Telekom Slovenije
- 2010–2011: Adria Mobil

Mitja Mahorič (born 12 May 1976) is a Slovenian cyclist. He won the mountain race of the Slovenian National Road Race Championships in 2001 and 2003 as well as the Tour of Slovenia in 2003 and 2004.

== Major results ==
2000
2nd Time trial, National Road Championships
5th Overall Tour of Slovenia

1st Stage 4

2001
1st Time trial, National Road Championships
2002
10th Overall Istrian Spring Trophy
10th Overall Tour of Austria
2003
1st Overall Tour of Slovenia
1st Time trial, National Road Championships
2nd Overall Paths of King Nikola
2nd GP Istria
4th Overall Istrian Spring Trophy
2004
1st Overall Tour of Slovenia

1st Stage 5

7th Overall Tour de Normandie
2005
1st Overall Paths of King Nikola
1st Road race, National Road Championships
4th Overall Vuelta a Cuba
4th GP Triberg-Schwarzwald
6th Overall Circuit de Lorraine
7th Overall Circuit des Ardennes
7th Overall Tour of Slovenia
9th Berner Rundfahrt
2006
1st Raiffeisen Grand Prix
3rd Overall Paths of King Nikola

1st Stage 4

4th Overall Szlakiem Grodów Piastowskich
4th Overall Course de Solidarność et des Champions Olympiques
6th Overall Rothaus Regio-Tour
7th Overall Olympia's Tour
8th GP Triberg-Schwarzwald
9th Overall Tour of Slovenia
2007
1st Overall Paths of King Nikola
1st Mountains classification Circuit des Ardennes
1st Mountains classification Okolo Slovenska
2nd Overall Szlakiem Grodów Piastowskich
3rd Overall Tour of Croatia
4th Beograd-Cacak
6th Overall Tour du Loir-et-Cher

1st Stage 3

6th GP Triberg-Schwarzwald
9th Overall Tour of Slovenia
9th GP Kranj
2008
1st Overall Paths of King Nikola

1st Stages 1 & 2

1st Stage 11 Vuelta a Cuba
1st Mountains classification Tour of Slovenia
1st Classic Beograd-Cacak
3rd Overall Szlakiem Grodów Piastowskich
5th Overall Circuit des Ardennes
2009
1st Overall Istrian Spring Trophy
1st Road race, National Road Championships
3rd Overall Tour of Qinghai Lake
4th Overall Paths of King Nikola
8th Overall Tour of Slovenia
2010
4th Overall Tour of Qinghai Lake
9th Overall Circuit Cycliste Sarthe
10th Overall Tour of Slovenia
2011
3rd Overall Istrian Spring Trophy
