= Matej Marin =

Slovenian cyclist (1980–2021)

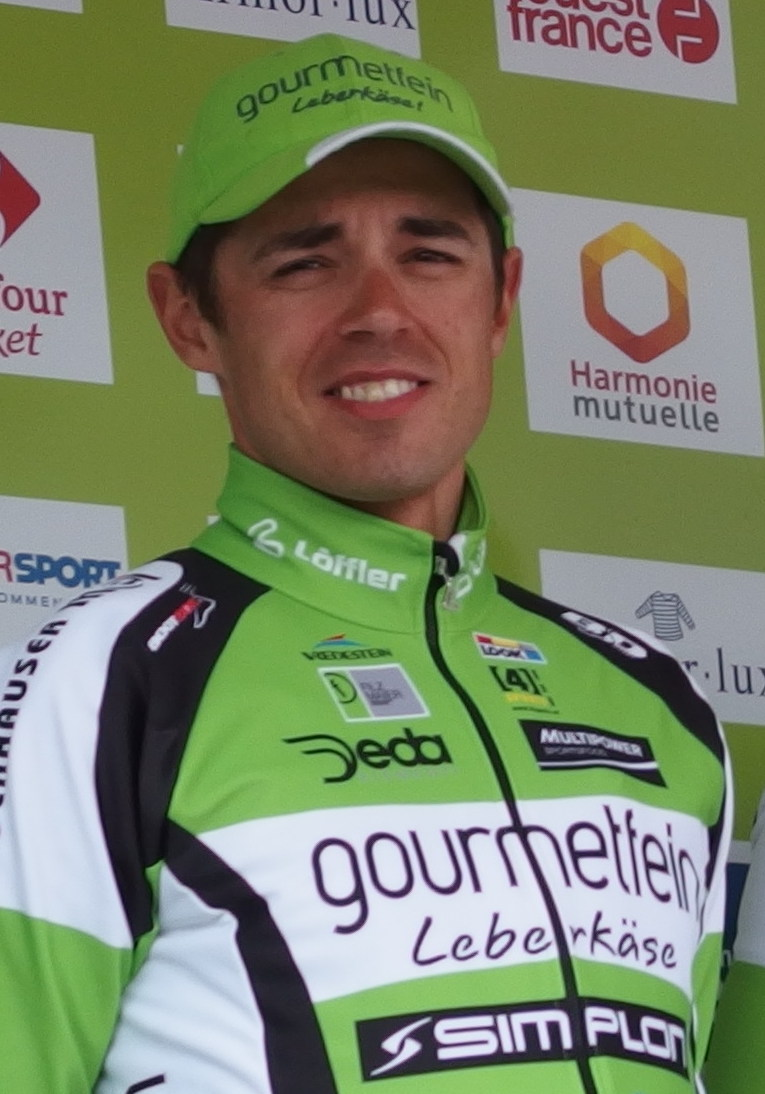
- Marin at the 2014 Tour de Bretagne

Personal information
- Born: 2 July 1980 Slovenia, Yugoslavia
- Died: 5 September 2021 (aged 41)

Cycling career
- Sport: Cycling
- Current team: Retired
- Discipline: Road
- Role: Rider

Professional teams
- 2003–2011: Perutnina Ptuj
- 2012–2015: RC Arbö–Wels–Gourmetfein

Matej Marin (2 July 1980 – 5 September 2021) was a Slovenian professional racing cyclist, who rode professionally between 2003 and 2015 for the Perutnina Ptuj and Team Felbermayr–Simplon Wels teams. He rode at the 2013 UCI Road World Championships.

== Major results ==
2003
2nd Overall Tour de Serbie
2004
2nd Overall Tour de Serbie
2005
9th GP Kranj
2006
1st Stage 1 Rhône-Alpes Isère Tour
2008
6th Tour of Vojvodina I
7th Tour of Vojvodina II
2009
1st Tour of Vojvodina I
2010
1st Banja Luka–Belgrade II
2011
2nd Banja Luka–Belgrade I
9th Raiffeisen Grand Prix
2012
3rd Overall Tour of Szeklerland

1st Stage 1 (TTT)

2013
Istrian Spring Trophy

1st Points classification
1st Stage 3

2nd GP Sencur
2014
1st Grand Prix Sarajevo
3rd Croatia–Slovenia
2015
7th Belgrade–Banja Luka I
9th Croatia–Slovenia
