= Jure Golčer =

Slovenian road bicycle racer

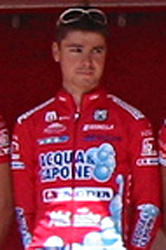

Personal information
- Full name: Jure Golčer
- Born: July 12, 1977 (age 49) Maribor, Yugoslavia
- Height: 1.80 m (5 ft 11 in)
- Weight: 66 kg (146 lb)

Cycling career
- Sport: Cycling
- Current team: Retired
- Discipline: Road
- Role: Rider

Professional teams
- 2001: Corratec World MTB Team
- 2002: Perutnina Ptuj–KRKA–Telekom Slovenije
- 2003: Volksbank–Ideal
- 2004: Formaggi Pinzolo Fiavè
- 2005: Acqua & Sapone–Adria Mobil
- 2006: Perutnina Ptuj
- 2007: Tenax–Menikini
- 2008–2009: LPR Brakes–Ballan
- 2010: De Rosa–Stac Plastic
- 2011: Perutnina Ptuj
- 2012–2013: Tirol Cycling Team
- 2014–2015: Gourmetfein–Simplon Wels
- 2016–2018: Adria Mobil

Major wins
- One-day races and Classics National Road Race Championships (2006) GP Izola (2016)

Jure Golčer (born July 12, 1977 in Maribor) is a Slovenian former professional road bicycle racer, who competed professionally between 2001 and 2018 for the Corratec World MTB Team, Volksbank–Ideal, Formaggi Pinzolo Fiavè, Acqua & Sapone–Adria Mobil, Tenax–Menikini, LPR Brakes–Farnese Vini, De Rosa–Stac Plastic, Perutnina Ptuj (three spells), Tirol Cycling Team, Team Felbermayr–Simplon Wels and Adria Mobil.

== Major results ==
2001
3rd Overall Jadranska Magistrala
2002
1st Overall Jadranska Magistrala
5th Overall Tour of Slovenia
2003
2nd Overall Tour of Slovenia

1st Stage 5

2nd Overall Tour of Austria
4th Time trial, National Road Championships
5th GP Triberg-Schwarzwald
6th Poreč Trophy 3
8th Overall Jadranska Magistrala
2004
1st Giro d'Oro
2nd Overall Giro del Trentino
5th Overall Tour of Austria
2005
6th Overall Brixia Tour
2006
1st Road race, National Road Championships
1st Overall Tour of Slovenia
1st GP Hydraulika Mikolasek
1st GP Triberg-Schwarzwald
7th Overall The Paths of King Nikola
7th Giro del Belvedere
2007
3rd Overall Tour of Austria
4th Memorial Marco Pantani
7th Monte Paschi Eroica
8th Overall Tour of Slovenia
2008
1st Overall Tour of Slovenia

1st Stage 3

4th Overall Giro del Trentino
9th Overall Tour of Austria
10th Overall Settimana Ciclistica Lombarda
2010
5th Road race, National Road Championships
2011
10th Overall Szlakiem Grodów Piastowskich
2012
3rd Overall Flèche du Sud
7th Overall Szlakiem Grodów Piastowskich
7th Overall Tour of Slovenia
2013
3rd Road race, National Road Championships
7th Overall Tour of Slovenia
7th Raiffeisen Grand Prix
2014
4th Overall Rhône-Alpes Isère Tour
5th Road race, National Road Championships
8th Overall Tour of Austria
9th Overall Tour of Slovenia
2015
3rd Overall Tour of Slovenia
7th Overall Rhône-Alpes Isère Tour
2016
1st GP Izola
5th Overall Istrian Spring Trophy
5th Overall Tour of Slovenia
2018
6th GP Laguna
8th Overall Szlakiem Walk Majora Hubala
