= Igor Kranjec =

Slovenian cyclist

Personal information
- Born: 27 September 1972 (age 54) Slovenia

Cycling career
- Sport: Cycling
- Current team: Retired
- Discipline: Road
- Role: Rider

Professional teams
- 2001–2002: De Nardi–Pasta Montegrappa
- 2004: Perutnina Ptuj

Igor Kranjec (born 27 September 1972 in Slovenia) is a former Slovenian cyclist.

== Major results ==
1996
1st Stage 4 Tour de Slovénie
1st Stage 6 Okolo Slovenska
1st GP Kranj
1997
2nd Overall Okolo Slovenska
1998
1st Road race, National Road Championships
1st Raiffeisen Grand Prix
1st Stage 1 GP Kranj
1999
1st Overall GP Kranj

1st Stage 3

1st Raiffeisen Grand Prix
2000
1st Overall Tour of Yugoslavia

1st Stages 1, 4 & 5

3rd Time trial, National Road Championships
3rd Poreč Trophy 5
3rd Lavanttaler Radsporttage
2001
1st Mountains classification UNIQA Classic
4th Giro d'Oro
2002
5th Stausee Rundfahrt
2006
8th GP Kranj
2007
2nd Beograd-Banja Luka I
3rd Beograd-Banja Luka II
8th Road race, National Road Championships
