= Matej Mugerli =

Slovenian cyclist

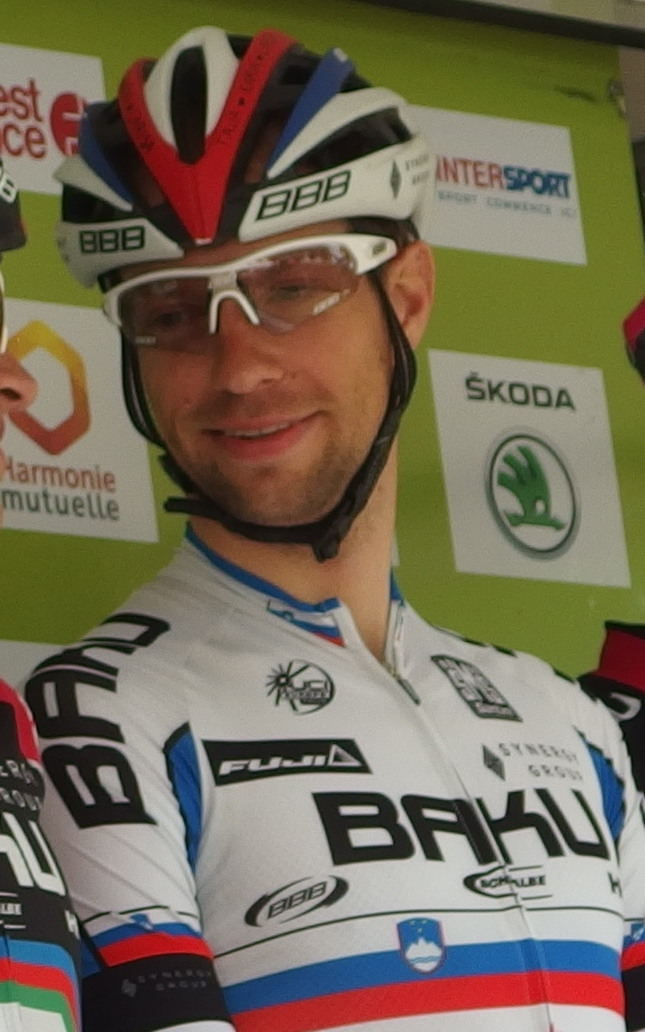
- Mugerli at the 2015 Tour de Bretagne

Personal information
- Full name: Matej Mugerli
- Born: 17 June 1981 (age 45): Nova Gorica, SR Slovenia, SFR Yugoslavia; (now Slovenia)
- Height: 1.82 m (6 ft 0 in)
- Weight: 68 kg (150 lb)

Cycling career
- Sport: Cycling
- Current team: Hrinkow Advarics
- Discipline: Road
- Role: Rider (retired); Directeur sportif

Amateur teams
- 2001: Zoccorinese–Vellutex
- 2002: Perutnina Ptuj–KRKA–Telekom Slovenije
- 2003: Filmop
- 2004: Ima–Moro–Brugnotto–Zottarelli–Spercenigo
- 2004: Vini Caldirola–Nobili Rubinetterie (stagiaire)
- 2009–2010: Perutnina Ptuj

Professional teams
- 2005–2008: Liquigas–Bianchi
- 2011: Perutnina Ptuj
- 2012–2014: Adria Mobil
- 2015–2016: Synergy Baku
- 2017–2020: Amplatz–BMC

Managerial team
- 2021–: Hrinkow Advarics Cycleang

Major wins
- One-day races and Classics National Road Race Championships (2014)

Matej Mugerli (born 17 June 1981 in Nova Gorica) is a Slovenian former professional road bicycle racer, who rode professionally between 2005 and 2008, and from 2011 to 2020 for the Liquigas, Perutnina Ptuj, Adria Mobil, Synergy Baku and SPORT.LAND. Niederösterreich teams. He now works as a directeur sportif for UCI Continental team Hrinkow Advarics.

== Major results ==
1998
5th Road race, UCI Junior Road World Championships
2001
5th GP Kranj
2003
2nd GP Kranj
5th Road race, UCI Under-23 Road World Championships
6th Trofeo Gianfranco Bianchin
8th Giro del Belvedere
2004
1st Overall Giro del Friuli-Venezia Giulia
1st Gran Premio Industrie del Marmo
Volta do Rio de Janeiro

1st Mountains classification
1st Stages 3 & 4

2nd Trofeo Città di San Vendemiano
2005
4th Gran Premio di Chiasso
9th Tour du Haut Var
9th Classic Haribo
10th Gran Premio di Lugano
2006
1st Stage 6 Volta a Catalunya
2007
2nd GP Kranj
2010
1st Zagreb–Ljubljana
2nd Overall Tour de Serbie

1st Stage 5

2011
4th Overall Tour of China

1st Stage 8

4th Overall Tour of Qinghai Lake
5th Raiffeisen Grand Prix
7th Ljubljana–Zagreb
9th Tour of Vojvodina I
10th Poreč Trophy
2012
1st Poreč Trophy
1st Banja Luka–Beograd II
2nd Ljubljana–Zagreb
4th Giro di Toscana
6th Overall Course de la Solidarité Olympique
8th Tour of Vojvodina II
10th Gran Premio di Lugano
10th Tour of Vojvodina I
2013
1st Overall Istrian Spring Trophy

1st Stage 1

1st Poreč Trophy
1st Banja Luka–Beograd II
1st Classic Beograd–Čačak
National Road Championships

2nd Road race
2nd Time trial

2nd Grand Prix Südkärnten
3rd Banja Luka–Beograd I
4th GP Sencur
4th Giro di Toscana
6th Croatia–Slovenia
7th Trofeo Laigueglia
7th Central European Tour Budapest GP
8th Raiffeisen Grand Prix
2014
1st Road race, National Road Championships
1st Trofej Umag
1st Gran Premio Industrie del Marmo
2nd Grand Prix Südkärnten
3rd Poreč Trophy
4th Overall Circuit des Ardennes
4th GP Izola
4th Central European Tour Ibrány GP
5th Overall Okolo Slovenska
5th Giro del Medio Brenta
8th Overall Istrian Spring Trophy
8th Gran Premio di Lugano
9th Raiffeisen Grand Prix
10th Overall Tour d'Azerbaïdjan
2015
2nd Odessa Grand Prix I
2nd Odessa Grand Prix II
3rd Overall Tour d'Azerbaïdjan
5th Belgrade–Banja Luka I
6th Overall Tour de Bretagne

1st Stage 2

7th Tour of Almaty
9th Overall Tour of Qinghai Lake
2016
1st Overall Tour de Serbie

1st Stage 3

1st Poreč Trophy
1st Stage 3 Tour d'Azerbaïdjan
2nd Overall Tour of Qinghai Lake
3rd Overall Istrian Spring Trophy

1st Stage 3

3rd Overall Tour of Szeklerland

1st Points classification
1st Stage 3b

2017
1st Overall Istrian Spring Trophy

1st Stage 2

1st Poreč Trophy
1st GP Kranj
1st Stage 3 Tour d'Azerbaïdjan
1st Stage 3 Okolo Slovenska
3rd GP Izola
