= Klemen Štimulak =

Slovenian cyclist

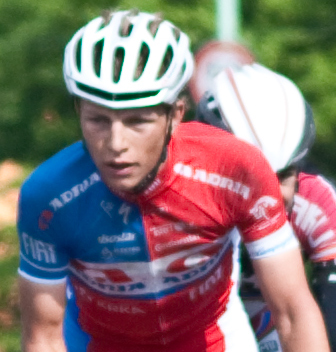
- Štimulak in 2014

Personal information
- Born: 20 July 1990 (age 36) Dobrna, Slovenia

Cycling career
- Sport: Cycling
- Current team: Retired
- Discipline: Road
- Role: Rider

Professional teams
- 2009–2012: Radenska–KD Financial Point
- 2013–2015: Adria Mobil

Major wins
- One-day races and Classics National Time Trial Championships (2013)

Klemen Štimulak (born 20 July 1990) is a Slovenian retired racing cyclist, who rode professionally between 2009 and 2015 for the Radenska and Adria Mobil teams. He rode at the 2014 UCI Road World Championships.

== Major results ==
2009
7th Ljubljana–Zagreb
2010
3rd Time trial, National Under-23 Road Championships
2011
9th La Côte Picarde
2012
3rd Time trial, National Under-23 Road Championships
3rd Trofeo Banca Popolare di Vicenza
6th Overall Coupe des nations Ville Saguenay
2013
1st Time trial, National Road Championships
3rd Croatia–Slovenia
2014
1st Giro del Medio Brenta
1st Mountains classification Tour of Slovenia
2nd Time trial, National Road Championships
2015
3rd Time trial, National Road Championships
