= Nevio =

Nevio is a masculine given name which is borne by:

- Nevio Devide (born 1966), Italian former tennis player
- Nevio de Zordo (1943–2014), Italian bobsledder
- Nevio Marasović (born 1983), Croatian film director and screenwriter
- Nevio Orlandi (born 1954), Italian football manager
- Nevio Passaro (born 1980), German–Italian singer, songwriter and producer
- Nevio Pizzolitto (born 1976), Canadian soccer player
- Nevio Scala (born 1947), Italian football sporting director, coach and former player
- Nevio Skull (1903–1945), Italian businessman and politician
- Nevenko Valčić (1933–2007), Yugoslav cyclist nicknamed Nevio
