= Martin Otoničar =

Slovenian bicycle racer

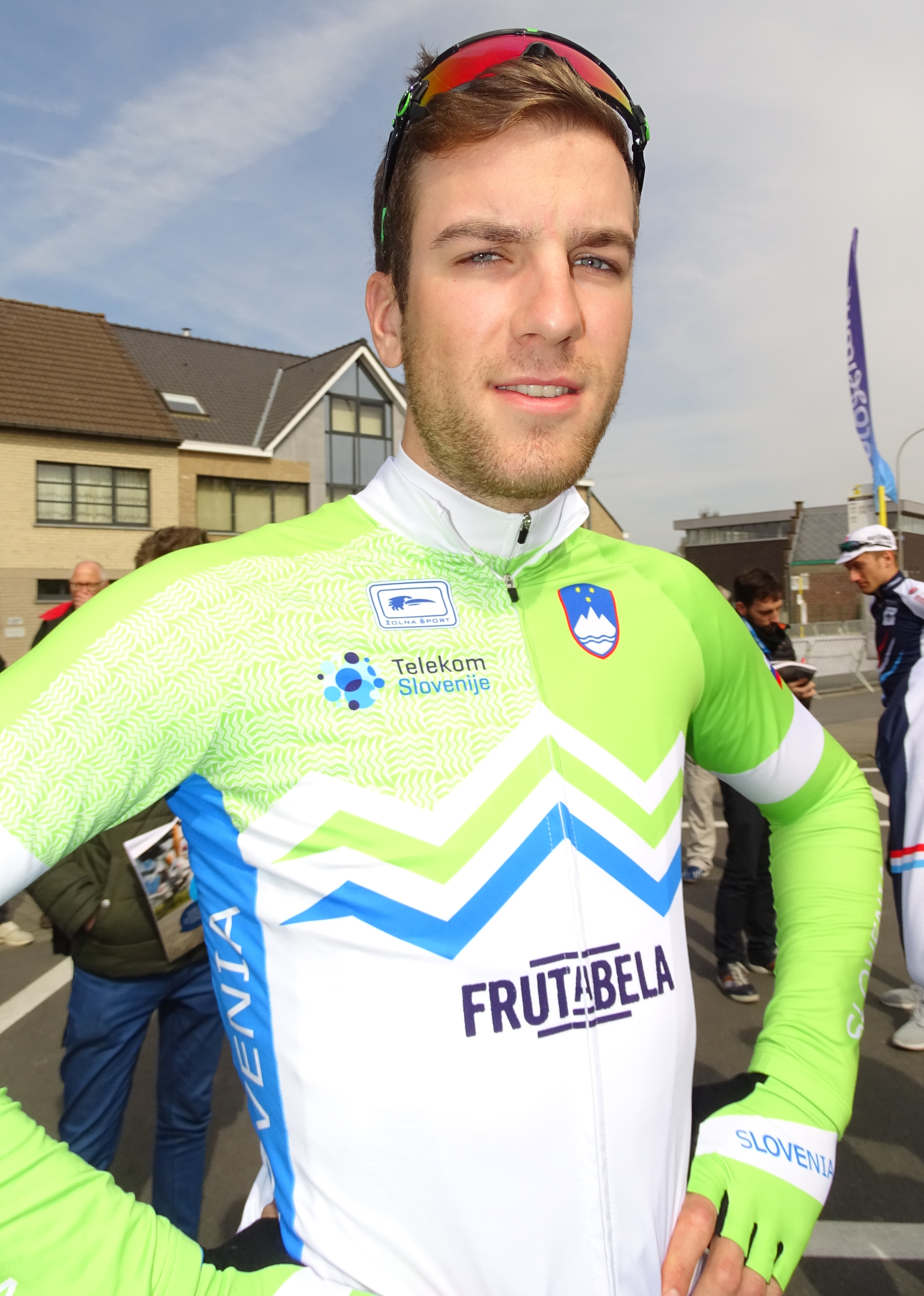
- Otoničar in 2016

Personal information
- Full name: Martin Otoničar
- Born: 8 May 1994 (age 32)

Cycling career
- Sport: Cycling
- Current team: Retired
- Discipline: Road
- Role: Rider

Amateur team
- 2016: Delio Gallina–Colosio–Eurofeed

Professional team
- 2013–2015: Radenska

Martin Otoničar (born 8 May 1994) is a Slovenian former professional cyclist.

== Major results ==
2011
National Junior Road Championships

1st Road race
2nd Time trial

2nd Trofeo Guido Dorigo
6th Overall Grand Prix Général Patton

1st Stage 2

2012
2nd Coppa Pietro Linari
3rd Overall Tour de la Région de Lódz

1st Stage 3

4th Paris–Roubaix Juniors
6th GP Dell'Arno
7th Piccola San Remo
2014
1st Banja Luka–Belgrade I
2nd Central European Tour Košice–Miskolc
4th Trofej Umag
8th Banja Luka–Belgrade II
2015
1st Grand Prix Šenčur
1st Points classification Istrian Spring Trophy
4th GP Slovakia
5th Time trial, National Road Championships
8th Gran Premio della Liberazione
2016
5th Time trial, National Road Championships
