= Mattia De Marchi =

Italian cyclist

Personal information
- Full name: Mattia De Marchi
- Born: 3 June 1991 (age 35) Mirano, Italy

Cycling career
- Sport: Cycling
- Disciplines: Road; Gravel
- Role: Rider

Amateur teams
- 2007: S.C. Calzaturificio Donna Carolina
- 2008–2009: Team La Torre
- 2011–2014: U.S. Fausto Coppi Gazzera–Videa
- 2015–2016: Cycling Team Friuli

Professional teams
- 2016: Androni Giocattoli–Sidermec (stagiaire)
- 2017: Hrinkow Advarics Cycleang

Mattia De Marchi (born 3 June 1991 in Mirano) is an Italian former professional road cyclist and current gravel racer.

== Major results ==
2015
1st Stage 4 Okolo Jižních Čech
9th Overall Tour of Małopolska
2016
1st GP Kranj
1st Stage 4 Tour of China I
7th Croatia–Slovenia
8th Trofeo Edil C
10th Gran Premio Industrie del Marmo
2023
1st The Traka 360
2024
1st Utopia Gravel Fest
5th Unbound Gravel 200
