= Perutnina Ptuj (cycling team) =

Cycling team (1985–2011)

Team information
- UCI code: PER
- Registered: Slovenia
- Founded: 1985
- Discipline: Road
- Status: Amateur (–2001; 2009–2010; 2012–); Division II (2002); Division III (2003–2004); UCI Continental (2005–2008; 2011)

Team name history
- 1999–2001; 2002; 2003–: Perutnina Ptuj–Radenska Rog; Perutnina Ptuj–KRKA–Telekom Slovenije; Perutnina Ptuj

Perutnina Ptuj (UCI team code: PER) is a road cycling team. It was founded in 1985, as Kolesarski klub Ptuj and started as a recreative club. In 1992 Kolesarski klub Ptuj signed a list about permanent collaboration with Perutnina Ptuj and was renamed in Kolesarski klub Perutnina Ptuj. It is based in Ptuj, Slovenia. Senior team participated on professional level and competed at UCI Continental Circuits races 2002–2008 and 2011.

== Major wins ==
2002
Poreč Trophy III, Boštjan Mervar
Overall Istrian Spring Trophy, Jure Golčer

Stage 1, Boštjan Mervar

Stage 5 Tour of Slovenia, Boštjan Mervar
Raiffeisen GP, Boštjan Mervar
Stage 2 Tour of Austria, Boštjan Mervar
Slovenia Road Race Championships, Boris Premužič
2003
GP Istria 1, Boštjan Mervar
GP Istria 2, Dean Podgornik
GP Istria 3, Radoslav Rogina
Poreč Trophy II, Boštjan Mervar
Stage 1 Istrian Spring Trophy, Boštjan Mervar
Overall The Paths of King Nikola, Radoslav Rogina
Stages 1 & 3, Radoslav Rogina
GP Krka, Dean Podgornik
Overall Tour of Slovenia, Mitja Mahorič

Stage 6, Boštjan Mervar

Stage 8 Olympia's Tour, Dean Podgornik
Stage 2 Tour of Serbia, Miran Kelner
Stage 3b Tour of Serbia, Dean Podgornik
Slovenia Time Trial Championships, Mitja Mahorič
Croatia Time Trial Championships, Radoslav Rogina
Croatia Road Race Championships, Radoslav Rogina
Stage 3 UNIQA Classic, Boštjan Mervar
2004
Poreč Trophy, Matej Stare
Stage 2 Istrian Spring Trophy, Borut Božič
Overall The Paths of King Nikola, Massimo Demarin

Stage 2, Massimo Demarin

Overall Tour of Slovenia, Mitja Mahorič

Stages 2 & 3, Borut Božič
Stage 5, Mitja Mahorič

Stage 6 Olympia's Tour, Aldo Ino Ilešič
Stage 1 FBD Milk Ras, Valter Bonca
Stage 6 Tour de Serbie, Borut Božič
Croatia Time Trial Championships, Matija Kvasina
Croatia Road Race Championships, Tomislav Dančulović
2005
Stage 6 Vuelta a Cuba, Matej Marin
Stage 7 Vuelta a Cuba, Gregor Gažvoda
Overall Istrian Spring Trophy, Borut Božič

Prologue, Boštjan Mervar
Stage 2, Borut Božič

Overall The Paths of King Nikola, Mitja Mahorič

Stage 1b, Team Time Trial

Stage 1 Tour du Loir-et-Cher, Matej Stare
GP Kranj, Martin Hvastija
Stage 4 Tour of Slovenia, Boštjan Mervar
Overall Tour de Serbie, Matija Kvasina

Stage 1a, Matej Marin
Stage 2, Matija Kvasina

Slovenia Time Trial Championships, Gregor Gažvoda
Slovenia Road Race Championships, Mitja Mahorič
Croatia Road Race Championships, Matija Kvasina
Stage 3 Tour de l'Avenir, Borut Božič
2006
Stage 4, 11b & 13 Vuelta a Cuba, Borut Božič
Stage 8 Vuelta a Cuba, Boštjan Mervar
Stage 11a Vuelta a Cuba, Matija Kvasina
Overall Istrian Spring Trophy, Borut Božič

Prologue, Borut Božič

Overall The Paths of King Nikola, Radoslav Rogina

Stage 2, Matej Stare
Stage 3, Radoslav Rogina
Stage 4, Mitja Mahorič

Stage 1 Circuit des Ardennes, Borut Božič
Overall Rhône-Alpes Isère Tour, Tomislav Dančulović

Stage 1, Matej Marin

Stages 1, 2 & 7 Olympia's Tour, Borut Božič
GP Hydraulika Mikolasek, Jure Golčer
GP Palma, Boštjan Mervar
GP Kranj, Boštjan Mervar
GP Triberg-Schwarzwald, Jure Golčer
GP Judendorf-Strassengel, Mitja Mahorič
Stages 1 & 4 Tour of Slovenia, Borut Božič
Croatia Time Trial Championships, Matija Kvasina
Croatia Road Race Championships, Hrvoje Miholjević
Slovenia Road Race Championships, Jure Golčer
Stage 4 Course de la Solidarité Olympique, Aldo Ino Ilešič
2007
Overall The Paths of King Nikola, Mitja Mahorič

Stage 1, Matej Stare

Stage 3 Tour du Loir-et-Cher, Mitja Mahorič
Belgrade-Čačak, Matija Kvasina
GP Triberg-Schwarzwald, Radoslav Rogina
Overall Tour de Serbie, Matej Stare

Stage 3, Radoslav Rogina
Stage 5, Matej Stare

Croatia Time Trial Championships, Matija Kvasina
Stage 2 Course de la Solidarité Olympique, Matija Kvasina
Stage 4b Tour de Slovaquie, Matej Stare
Overall Tour de Croatie, Radoslav Rogina

Stage 3, Mitja Mahorič

2008
Stages 2 & 6 Vuelta a Cuba, Jure Kocjan
Stages 5 & 13 Vuelta a Cuba, Kristijan Koren
Stage 11 Vuelta a Cuba, Mitja Mahorič
Stage 12 Vuelta a Cuba, Mitja Mahorič
Prologue Istrian Spring Trophy, Kristijan Koren
Overall The Paths of King Nikola, Mitja Mahorič

Stages 1 & 2, Mitja Mahorič
Stage 3, Kristijan Fajt

Stage 4 Circuit des Ardennes, Gregor Gažvoda
Belgrade–Banja Luka II, Matej Stare
Belgrade–Čačak, Mitja Mahorič
GP Judendorf-Strassengel, Matej Stare
Velika Nagrada Ptuja, Gregor Gažvoda
Stage 2 Tour of Slovenia, Radoslav Rogina
Overall Tour de Serbie, Matija Kvasina

Stages 2 & 4, Radoslav Rogina

Croatia Time Trial Championships, Matija Kvasina
Slovenia Time Trial Championships, Gregor Gažvoda
Stage 3 Tour of Qinghai Lake, Kristijan Fajt
Stage 9 Tour of Qinghai Lake, Jure Kocjan
Kroz Vojvodina II, Gregor Gažvoda
2009
Kroz Vojvodina I, Matej Marin
2010
Overall Istrian Spring Trophy, Robert Vrečer

Prologue & Stage 2, Robert Vrečer

Zagreb–Ljubljana, Matej Mugerli
Overall Tour de Slovaquie, Robert Vrečer

Stages 4 & 5, Robert Vrečer

Trofeo Bianchin, Robert Vrečer
2011
Overall Istrian Spring Trophy, Robert Vrečer

Prologue & Stage 2, Robert Vrečer

Overall Szlakiem Grodów Piastowskich, Robert Vrečer

Stage 2, Robert Vrečer

Prologue Tour of Slovenia, Robert Vrečer
Overall Tour of Qinghai Lake, Gregor Gazvoda

Stage 3, Gregor Gazvoda

Tour of Vojvodina I, Gregor Gazvoda
Stage 8 Tour of China, Matej Mugerli

== 2011 squad ==
As of May 30, 2011.

Rider	Date of birth
Dejan Bajt (SLO)	October 28, 1987 (age 38)
Tomaž Bauman (SLO)	November 5, 1990 (age 35)
Gregor Gazvoda (SLO)	October 15, 1981 (age 44)
Jure Golčer (SLO)	July 12, 1977 (age 49)
Matej Marin (SLO)	July 2, 1980 (age 46)
Matej Mugerli (SLO)	June 17, 1981 (age 45)
Amadej Petelinšek (SLO)	October 16, 1992 (age 33)

Rider	Date of birth
Luka Rakuša (SLO)	May 1, 1985 (age 41)
Boštjan Rezman (SLO)	December 12, 1980 (age 45)
Žiga Slak (SLO)	March 5, 1991 (age 35)
Alen Tement (SLO)	December 21, 1990 (age 35)
Nico Vogrinec (SLO)	October 19, 1990 (age 35)
Robert Vrečer (SLO)	October 8, 1980 (age 45)
