= Jan Bratkowski =

German cyclist

Personal information
- Born: 25 July 1975 (age 51) Würzburg, Germany

Cycling career
- Sport: Cycling
- Current team: Retired
- Discipline: Road
- Role: Rider

Professional teams
- 1997: Team E-plus Service
- 1998: Gerolsteiner
- 1998: Team Koga–Wattenscheid
- 1999: De Nardi–Pasta Montegrappa
- 2000: Mercury Cycling Team
- 2000: Team Coast
- 2001: De Nardi–Pasta Montegrappa
- 2002: Cage Maglierie–Olmo
- 2005: Team Lamonta

Jan Bratkowski (born 25 July 1975) is a German former professional racing cyclist. He notably won the Raiffeisen Grand Prix in 2001 and the Grand Prix Pino Cerami in 2000.

== Major results ==
1999
2nd Overall GP Kranj

1st Stage 2

2nd Raiffeisen Grand Prix
9th Overall UNIQA Classic

1st Stage 2

2000
1st Grand Prix Pino Cerami
1st Stage 12 Tour de Langkawi
2nd Route Adélie
4th First Union Invitational
4th GP de la Ville de Rennes
5th Road race, National Road Championships
7th Omloop van het Houtland
7th Tour Beneden-Maas
2001
1st Raiffeisen Grand Prix
1st Poreč Trophy 4
2nd Poreč Trophy 3
7th Stausee-Rundfahrt
8th Giro della Provincia di Siracusa
2002
3rd Trofeo dell'Etna
2005
2nd GP Buchholz
10th GP Rudy Dhaenens
