= Team Ljubljana Gusto Santic =

Slovenian cycling team

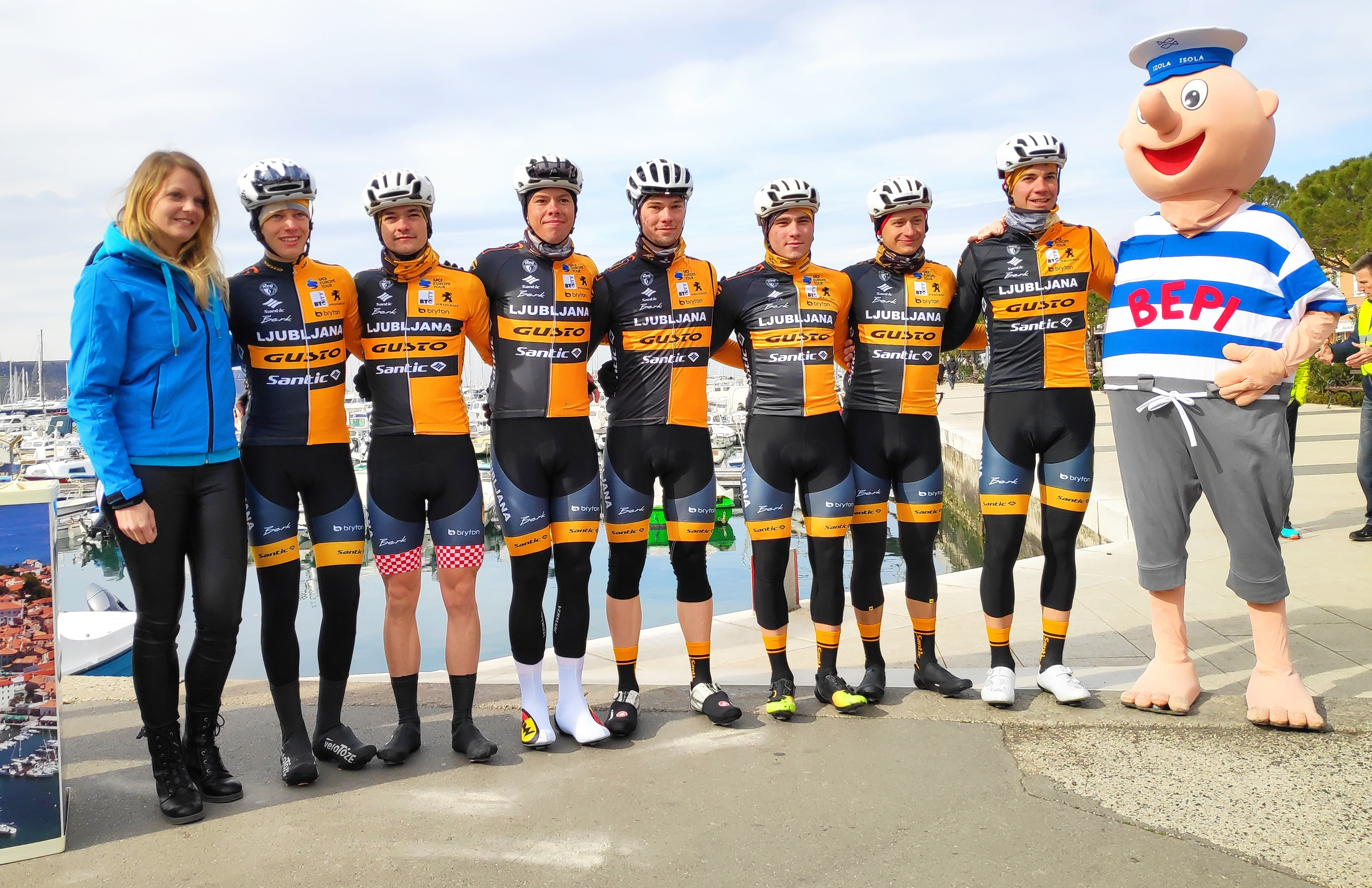
- Ljubljana Gusto Santic on 2019 GP Izola

Team information
- UCI code: LGS
- Registered: Slovenia
- Founded: 1949
- Discipline: Road
- Status: Continental
- Bicycles: Gusto
- Website: Team home page

Key personnel
- General manager: Tomaž Poljanec
- Team managers: Luka Žele; Miha Koncilija

Team name history
- 1949–2005 2005 2006–2007 2008–2009 2010 2011–2014 2015–2016 2017 2018 2019–: Rog Ljubljana; Radenska–Rog; Radenska–PowerBar; Radenska–KD Financial Point; Zheroquadro–Radenska; Radenska; Radenska–Ljubljana; Rog–Ljubljana; Team Ljubljana Gusto Xaurum; Team Ljubljana Gusto Santic
Team Ljubljana Gusto Santic jersey
Jersey

Team Ljubljana Gusto Santic (UCI team code: LGS) is a Slovenian cycling team founded in 1949, which has competed as a UCI Continental team since 2005. It participates in UCI Continental Circuits races.

== Team roster ==
As of 17 February 2021.

Rider	Date of birth
Blaž Avbelj (SLO)	2 November 2001 (age 24)
Zac Barnhill (AUS)	18 November 2002 (age 23)
Tilen Finkšt (SLO)	6 July 1997 (age 29)
Dylan Hopkins (AUS)	23 September 2001 (age 24)
Jernej Hribar (SLO)	19 July 2002 (age 24)
Carlo Jurišević (CRO)	14 October 2001 (age 24)

Rider	Date of birth
Matic Maček (SLO)	8 October 2002 (age 23)
Teo Pečnik (SLO)	31 March 2002 (age 24)
Peng Yuan-tang (TWN)	10 May 1993 (age 33)
Viktor Potočki (CRO)	27 March 1999 (age 27)
Anže Skok (SLO)	15 September 2000 (age 25)
Ažbe Žibert (SLO)	21 December 2002 (age 23)

== Major wins ==
2005
Stage 1 Istrian Spring Trophy, Jure Kocjan
2006
Slovenia Time Trial Championships, Kristjan Fajt
Stage 6 Tour de Slovaquie, Matic Strgar
Tour of Vojvodina, Jure Kocjan
Trofeo Bianchin, Matic Strgar
2007
Beograd-Banja Luka I, Matej Gnezda
GP Kooperativa, Kristjan Fajt
2008
Cronoscalata Gardone Valtrompia, Robert Vrečer
Giro del Medio Brenta, Robert Vrečer
Ljubljana–Zagreb, Robert Vrečer
Kroz Vojvodina I, Robert Vrečer
Trofeo Bianchin, Robert Vrečer
2009
Overall Istrian Spring Trophy, Mitja Mahorič
Stage 4 The Paths of King Nikola, Bostjan Rezman
2010
Croatia Time Trial Championships, Matija Kvasina
Gran Premio della Liberazione, Jan Tratnik
Overall Coupe des Nations Ville de Saguenay, Luka Mezgec
2012
Piccolo Giro di Lombardia, Jan Polanc
2013
Slovenia Road Race Championships, Luka Pibernik
Overall Giro del Friuli-Venezia Giulia, Jan Polanc

Stage 4, Jan Polanc

Stage 2 Czech Cycling Tour, Luka Pibernik
2014
Banja Luka–Belgrad I, Martin Otoničar
2016
Stage 5 Tour de Hongrie, Rok Korošec
2017
Stage 2 Tour de Hongrie, Žiga Jerman
2018
Gent–Wevelgem Juniors, Žiga Jerman
Overall Giro della Regione Friuli Venezia Giulia, Tadej Pogačar
2019
Stage 3 Tour of Japan, Ben Hill
2021
Croatia Road Race Championships, Viktor Potočki
2021
Croatia Criterium Championships, Carlo Jurisevic

== National Champions ==
2006
Slovenia Time Trial, Kristjan Fajt
2010
Croatia Time Trial, Matija Kvasina
2013
Slovenia Road Race, Luka Pibernik
2021
Croatia Road Race, Viktor Potočki
2021
Croatia Criterium, Carlo Jurisevic
