= GP Hydraulika Mikolasek =

Road cycling race

Grand Prix Hydraulika Mikolasek
Race details
- Date: May
- Region: Slovakia
- Discipline: Road
- Competition: UCI Europe Tour
- Type: One day race

History
- First edition: 2005
- Editions: 5
- Final edition: 2010
- First winner: Andrey Mizourov (KAZ)
- Most wins: No repeat winners
- Final winner: Alois Kaňkovský (CZE)

The Grand Prix Hydraulika Mikolasek was a single-day road cycling race held annually in Slovakia from 2005 to 2010. It was part of UCI Europe Tour as a category 1.2 event. In 2005, the race was titled GP Jamp.

== Winners ==
Year	Winner	Second	Third
2005	(Kazakhstan) Andrey Mizourov	(Kazakhstan) Aleksandr Dyachenko	(Slovenia) Andrej Omulec
2006	(Slovenia) Jure Golčer	(Poland) Radosław Romanik	(Croatia) Radoslav Rogina
2007	(Poland) Marcin Sapa	(Poland) Grzegorz Zoledziowski	(Slovenia) Kristjan Fajt
2008	(Hungary) Péter Kusztor	(Italy) Davide D'Angelo	(Germany) Dominik Nerz
2009	Cancelled		
2010	(Czech Republic) Alois Kaňkovský	(Czech Republic) Petr Benčík	(Slovakia) Pavol Polievka
