= Istrian Spring Tour =

Croatian multi-day road cycling race

Race details
- Date: Mid-March
- Region: Istria
- Local name: Istarsko proljeće (in Croatian)
- Discipline: Road race
- Competition: UCI Europe Tour
- Type: Stage race

History
- First edition: 1961
- Editions: 65 (as of 2026)
- First winner: Nevio Valčić (YUG)
- Most wins: Janez Zakotnik (YUG) (4 wins)
- Most recent: Matisse Van Kerckhove (BEL)

The Istrian Spring Tour, formerly known as the Istrian Spring Trophy (Croatian: Istarsko proljeće), is a multi-day road bicycle race held annually in the Croatian part of the Istria peninsula. The race was first organized in 1961 as a small competition reserved to local cyclists. In 2000, it was opened to professional riders; since 2005, it is rated as a 2.2 event on the UCI Europe Tour. Before 2006, the race was called "Jadranska magistrala".

The 2012 edition of the race featured a prologue and three stages totaling 487 kilometres (303 mi), and was contested by more than 200 cyclists from 35 teams.

== Winners ==
Year	Country	Rider	Team
1961	Yugoslavia	Nevio Valčić	Pula
1962	Yugoslavia	Nevio Valčić	Pula
1963	Yugoslavia	Lino Sebelić	Pula
1964	Yugoslavia	Jože Šantavec	Odred Ljubljana
1965	Yugoslavia	Franc Škerlj	Rog Ljubljana
1966	Yugoslavia	Franc Škerlj	Rog Ljubljana
1967	Yugoslavia	Cvitko Bilić	Siporex Pula
1968	Yugoslavia	Cvitko Bilić	Siporex Pula
1969	Yugoslavia	Milivoj Pocrnja	Siporex Pula
1970	Yugoslavia	Cvitko Bilić	Siporex Pula
1971	Yugoslavia	Janez Zakotnik	Rog Ljubljana
1972	Yugoslavia	Janez Zakotnik	Rog Ljubljana
1973	Yugoslavia	Ivan Kastelic	Rog Ljubljana
1974	Yugoslavia	Janez Zakotnik	Rog Ljubljana
1975	Yugoslavia	Branko Bedeković	ZMC Zagreb
1976	Yugoslavia	Bojan Ropret	Sava Kranj
1977	Yugoslavia	Janez Zakotnik	Rog Ljubljana
1978	Yugoslavia	Drago Frelih	Sava Kranj
1979	Yugoslavia	Bojan Ropret	Sava Kranj
1980	Yugoslavia	Vinko Polončič	Rog Ljubljana
1981	Yugoslavia	Bruno Bulić	Siporex Pula
1982	Czechoslovakia	Milan Petroš	Bohumin ČSSR
1983	Yugoslavia	Petar Stojanović	Čukarički Beograd
1984	Yugoslavia	Primož Čerin	Rog Ljubljana
1985	Yugoslavia	Andrej Žaubi	Rog Ljubljana
1986	Yugoslavia	Željko Pavlić	ZMC Zagreb
1987	Yugoslavia	Marko Polanc	Sava Kranj
1988	Yugoslavia	Robert Pintarič	Rog Ljubljana
1989	Yugoslavia	Gorazd Penko	Rog Ljubljana
1990	Yugoslavia	Marko Polanc	Sava Kranj
1991	Yugoslavia	Aleš Pagon	Sava Kranj
1992	Slovenia	Jure Robič	Astra Ljubljana
1993	Estonia	Andres Lauk	Szolniki C.
1994	Slovenia	Sandi Papež	Krka Novo Mesto
1995	Bulgaria	Stanimir Odrinski	Celje
1996	Italy	Luca Manfredini	Caneva Italia
1997	Slovenia	Andrej Hauptman	Rog Ljubljana
1998	Austria	Mathias Buxhofer	ARBÖ Tel-Team
1999	Austria	Arno Kaspert	ARBÖ Elk haus
2000	Croatia	Vladimir Miholjević	KRKA–Telekom Slovenije
2001	Slovenia	Andrej Hauptman	Tacconi Sport–Vini Caldirola
2002	Slovenia	Jure Golčer	Perutnina Ptuj–KRKA Telekom
2003	Netherlands	Pieter Weening	Rabobank TT3
2004	Slovenia	Jure Zrimšek	Perutnina Ptuj–KRKA Telekom
2005	Slovenia	Borut Božič	Perutnina Ptuj
2006	Slovenia	Borut Božič	Perutnina Ptuj
2007	Norway	Edvald Boasson Hagen	Maxbo–Bianchi
2008	Italy	Eddy Ratti	Nippo–Endeka
2009	Slovenia	Mitja Mahorič	Radenska KD Financial Point
2010	Slovenia	Robert Vrečer	Perutnina Ptuj
2011	Slovenia	Robert Vrečer	Perutnina Ptuj
2012	Austria	Markus Eibegger	RC Arbö–Wels–Gourmetfein
2013	Slovenia	Matej Mugerli	Adria Mobil
2014	Denmark	Magnus Cort	Cult Energy–Vital Water
2015	Austria	Markus Eibegger	Synergy Baku
2016	Belgium	Olivier Pardini	Wallonie-Bruxelles–Group Protect
2017	Slovenia	Matej Mugerli	Amplatz–BMC
2018	Norway	Krister Hagen	Team Coop
2019	Austria	Felix Gall	Development Team Sunweb
2020	No race due to the COVID-19 pandemic		
2021	New Zealand	Finn Fisher-Black	Jumbo–Visma Development Team
2022	United States	Matthew Riccitello	Hagens Berman Axeon
2023	Netherlands	Tijmen Graat	Jumbo–Visma Development Team
2024	France	Noa Isidore	Decathlon–AG2R La Mondiale Development Team
2025	France	Adrien Boichis	Red Bull–Bora–Hansgrohe Rookies
2026	Belgium	Matisse Van Kerckhove	Visma–Lease a Bike Development

== Sources ==
- HBS: Pobjednici Jadranske Magistrale. Wayback Archive
