= Vladimir Kuvalja =

Bosnian cyclist (born 1977)

Vladimir Kuvalja (born 20 June 1977 in Bosnia Herzegovina) is a Yugoslavian road racing cyclist. He won his country's National Championship in 2012.

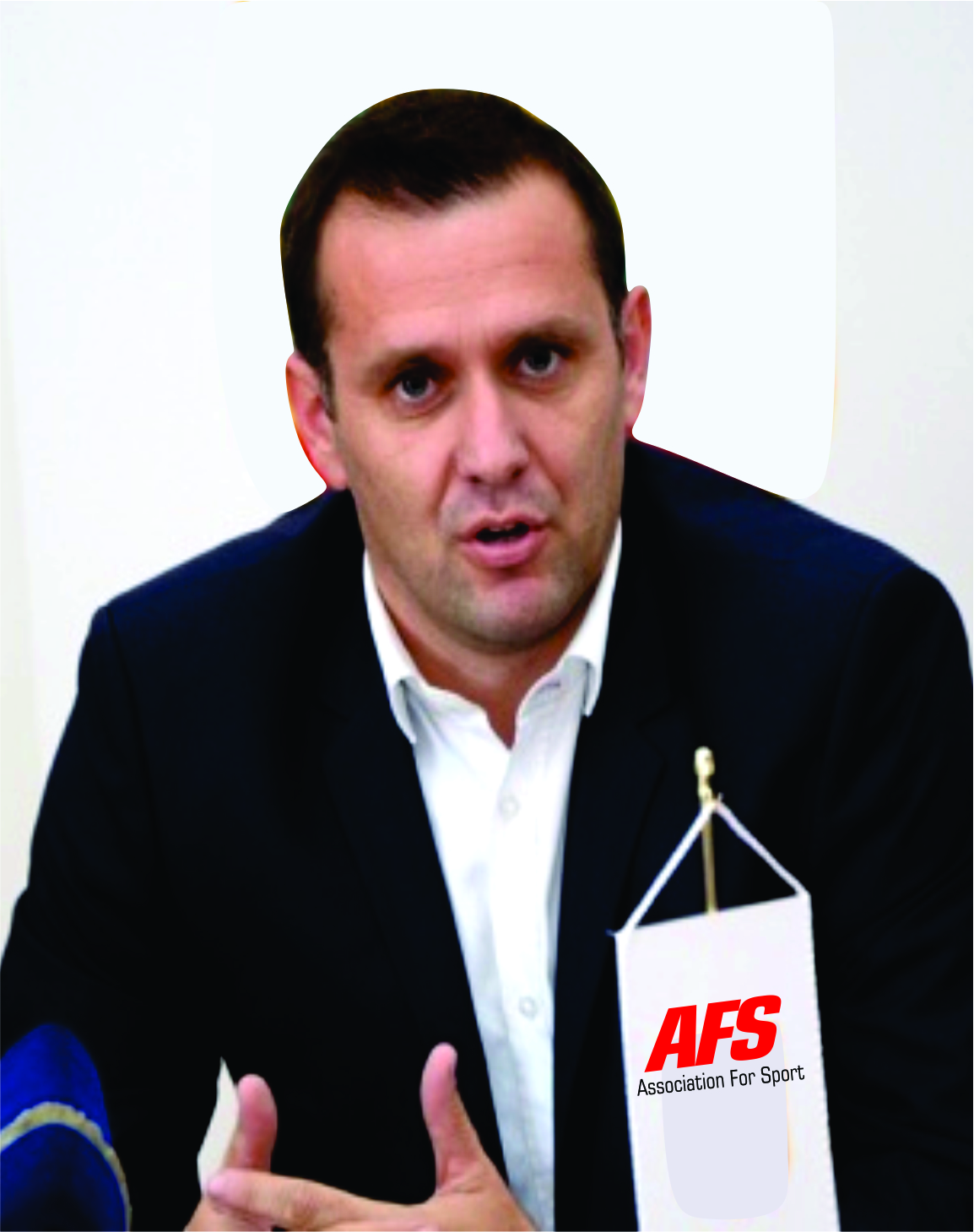
Vladimir Kuvalja, General director "AFS" photo 2015

General director of the Belgrade Banjaluka Belgrade–Banja Luka

== Major results ==
- 2012 National Champion Bosnia and Herzegovina
- 1993 National Champion Republic of Srpska
- 1994 National Champion Republic of Srpska
- 1995 Member od the Yugoslavia national cycling team
- 2001 Vice champion Formula A CEV
- 2005 Mediterranean Games Spain
- 2009 Mediterranean Games Italy
