= Grand Prix Sarajevo =

Bosnian one-day road cycling race

Race details
- Date: June
- Region: Bosnia and Herzegovina
- Discipline: Road
- Competition: UCI Europe Tour
- Type: One-day race

History
- First edition: 2014
- Editions: 2
- Final edition: 2015
- First winner: Matej Marin (SLO)
- Most wins: No repeat winners
- Final winner: Gašper Katrašnik (SLO)

The Grand Prix Sarajevo was a road cycling race held in 2014 and 2015 in Bosnia and Herzegovina. It was part of the UCI Europe Tour, as a category 1.2 race.

== Winners ==
Year	Country	Rider	Team
2014	Slovenia	Matej Marin	Gourmetfein–Simplon Wels
2015	Slovenia	Gašper Katrašnik	Sava
