= Matej Gnezda =

Slovenian bicycle racer

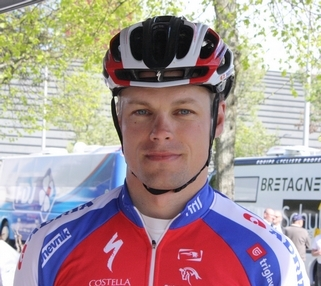
- Gnezda in 2011

Personal information
- Full name: Matej Gnezda
- Born: 12 January 1979 (age 47) Slovenia

Cycling career
- Sport: Cycling
- Current team: Retired
- Discipline: Road
- Role: Rider

Professional teams
- 2005–2008: Radenska–Rog
- 2009–2012: Adria Mobil

Matej Gnezda (born 12 January 1979) is a Slovenian former professional racing cyclist.

== Major results ==
2006
3rd Time trial, National Road Championships
2007
1st Belgrade–Banja Luka I
3rd Road race, National Road Championships
2008
2nd Belgrade–Banja Luka II
2010
1st Poreč Trophy
1st GP Kranj
2nd Road race, National Road Championships
2nd Trofeo Zsšdi
2012
2nd Poreč Trophy
