= Janez Zakotnik =

Yugoslav cyclist

Personal information
- Born: 2 June 1950 (age 76) Ljubljana, Yugoslavia

Cycling career
- Sport: Cycling

Janez Zakotnik (born 2 June 1950) is a former Yugoslav cyclist. He competed in the individual road race and team time trial events at the 1972 Summer Olympics.
