= GP Triberg-Schwarzwald =

Race details
- Date: Early June
- Region: Triberg, Germany
- Local name(s): GP Triberg-Schwarzwald (in German)
- Discipline: Road
- Competition: UCI Europe Tour
- Type: Single-day

History
- First edition: 2002
- Editions: 8
- Final edition: 2009
- First winner: Jorgen Bo Petersen (DEN)
- Final winner: Heinrich Haussler (GER)

The GP Triberg-Schwarzwald was a single-day road bicycle race held annually in June in Triberg im Schwarzwald, Germany. From 2005 to 2009 it was part of the UCI Europe Tour, being organised as 1.1 race.

== Winners ==
| Year | Country | Rider | Team |
|---|---|---|---|
| 2002 | Denmark | Jørgen Bo Petersen | EDS-Fakta |
| 2003 | Germany | Torsten Hiekmann | T-Mobile Team |
| 2004 | Germany | Markus Fothen | Gerolsteiner |
| 2005 | Germany | Fabian Wegmann | Gerolsteiner |
| 2006 | Slovenia | Jure Golčer | Perutnina Ptuj |
| 2007 | Croatia | Radoslav Rogina | Perutnina Ptuj |
| 2008 | Switzerland | Mathias Frank | Gerolsteiner |
| 2009 | Germany | Heinrich Haussler | Cervélo TestTeam |
