= 2015 Tour of Qinghai Lake =

UCI Asia Tour

Race details
- Stages: 13
- Distance: 2,022 km (1,256 mi)

The 2015 Tour of Qinghai Lake is the 14th edition of an annual professional road bicycle racing stage race held in Qinghai Province, China since 2002, named after Qinghai Lake. The race is run at the highest category (apart from those races which make up the UCI World Tour, and is rated by the International Cycling Union (UCI) as a 2.HC (hors category) race as part of the UCI Asia Tour.

== Stage Winners ==
List of stages
| Stage | Date | Route | Distance | Winner | Team |
|---|---|---|---|---|---|
| Stage 1 | 5 July | Xining – Xining | 121 km (75 mi) | Marko Kump (SVN) | Adria Mobil |
| Stage 2 | 6 July | Duoba – Datong | 188 km (117 mi) | Marko Kump (SVN) | Adria Mobil |
| Stage 3 | 7 July | Xining – Qinghai Lake | 148 km (92 mi) | Oleksandr Polivoda (UKR) | Kolss BDC Team |
| Stage 4 | 8 July | Qinghai Lake – Gangcha | 185 km (115 mi) | Ivan Savitskiy (RUS) | RusVelo |
| Stage 5 | 9 July | Xihaizhen – Gonghe | 133 km (83 mi) | Primož Roglič (SVN) | Adria Mobil |
| Stage 6 | 10 July | Gongche – Guide | 138 km (86 mi) | Marko Kump (SVN) | Adria Mobil |
| Stage 7 | 11 July | Guide – Xunhua | 190 km (118 mi) | Ilia Koshevoy (BLR) | Lampre-Merida |
| Stage 8 | 12 July | Xunhua – Linxia | 126 km (78 mi) | Mattia Gavazzi (ITA) | Amore & Vita - Selle SMP |
| Stage 9 | 13 July | Linxiai – Dingxi | 203 km (126 mi) | Marko Kump (SVN) | Adria Mobil |
| | 14 July | Rest day | | | |
| Stage 10 | 15 July | Tianshui – Tianshui | 100 km (62 mi) | Mattia Gavazzi (ITA) | Amore & Vita - Selle SMP |
| Stage 11 | 16 July | Tianshui – Pingliang | 235 km (146 mi) | Mattia Gavazzi (ITA) | Amore & Vita - Selle SMP |
| Stage 12 | 17 July | Zhongwei – Zhongwei | 120 km (75 mi) | Marko Kump (SVN) | Adria Mobil |
| Stage 13 | 18 July | Shuitonggou – Yinchuan | 135 km (84 mi) | Mattia Gavazzi (ITA) | Amore & Vita - Selle SMP |
