= Novo Mesto (cycling team) =

Slovenian cycling team

KK Novo Mesto
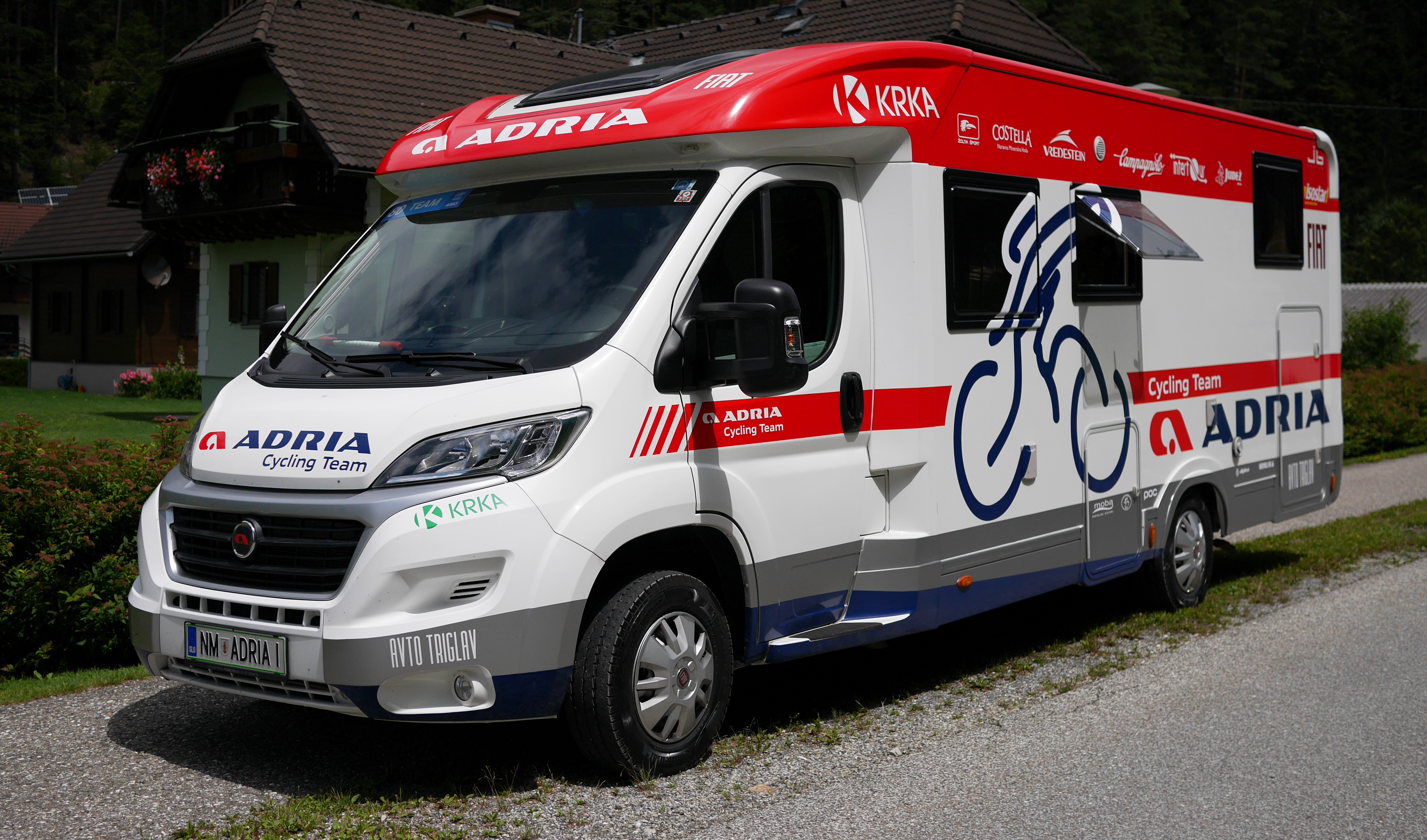
- Adria Mobil support car (2018)

Team information
- UCI code: ADR
- Registered: Novo Mesto, Slovenia
- Founded: 2005
- Discipline: Road
- Status: Continental
- Bicycles: 2003–2008 Moser; 2009–2010 Fondriest; 2011–2020 Specialized; 2021–2023 Basso Bikes; 2024 Merida; 2025-2026 Wilier Triestina
- Components: [[ ]]
- Website: Team home page

Key personnel
- General manager: Bogdan Fink
- Team managers: Srečko Glivar; Boštjan Mervar; Marko Kump (Directeur sportif)

Team name history
- 2005 2006–: KRKA–Adria Mobil; Adria Mobil
Novo Mesto jersey
Jersey

KK Novo Mesto (UCI team code: ADR) is a Continental cycling team founded in 1972 (as continental team from 2005). It is based in Novo Mesto, Slovenia and it participates in UCI Continental Circuits races.

Team was sponsored by producer of motorhomes and caravans Adria Mobil, which is also sponsoring GP Adria Mobil one day race and Tour of Slovenia. Adria Mobil sponsored up to season 2025, in 2026 they left main sponsorship to municipality Novo Mesto and renamed to KK Novo Mesto (Kolesarski Klub Novo Mesto).

== History ==
The team Adria Mobil started back in 1972 where the team was initially called Cycling team Novo mesto. In 1997 the club created a second professional cycling team KRKA–Telekom Slovenije this folded in 2011.

== Team roster ==
As of 23 May 2023.

Rider	Date of birth
Đorđe Đurić (SER)	21 June 2000 (age 26)
Tilen Finkšt (SLO)	6 July 1997 (age 29)
Gal Glivar (SLO)	1 May 2002 (age 24)
Kristjan Hočevar (SLO)	3 May 1999 (age 27)
Aljaž Jarc (SLO)	9 April 1999 (age 27)

Rider	Date of birth
Dimitar Jovanoski (MKD)	6 October 2003 (age 22)
Martin Jurík (SLO)	2 October 2004 (age 21)
Kristijan Koren (SLO)	25 November 1986 (age 39)
Boštjan Murn (SLO)	15 January 2001 (age 25)
Aljaž Turk (SLO)	23 December 2004 (age 21)

== Major wins ==
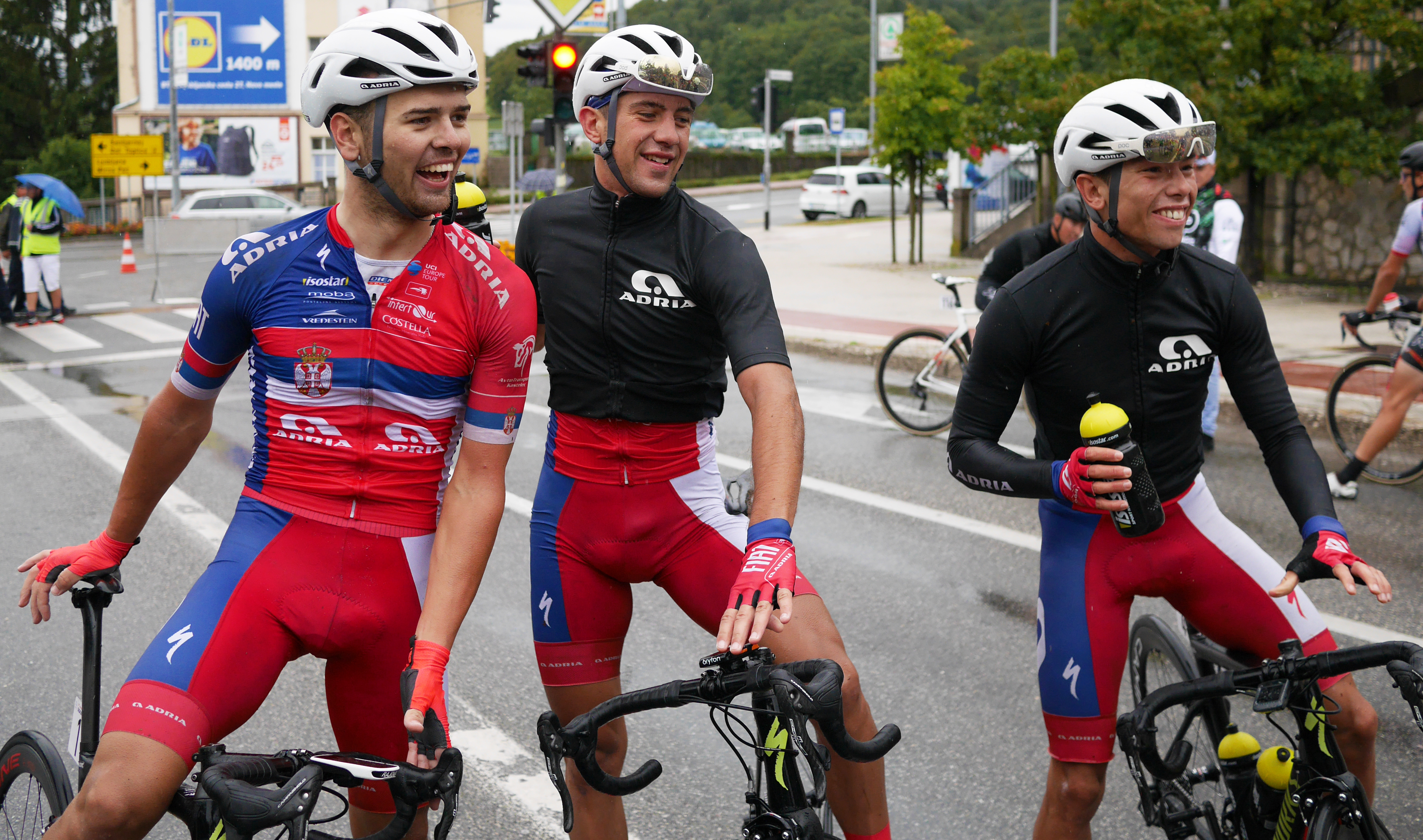
Team Adria Mobil celebrating victory on 2018 Croatia-Slovenia race which was won by Dušan Rajović (first from left)

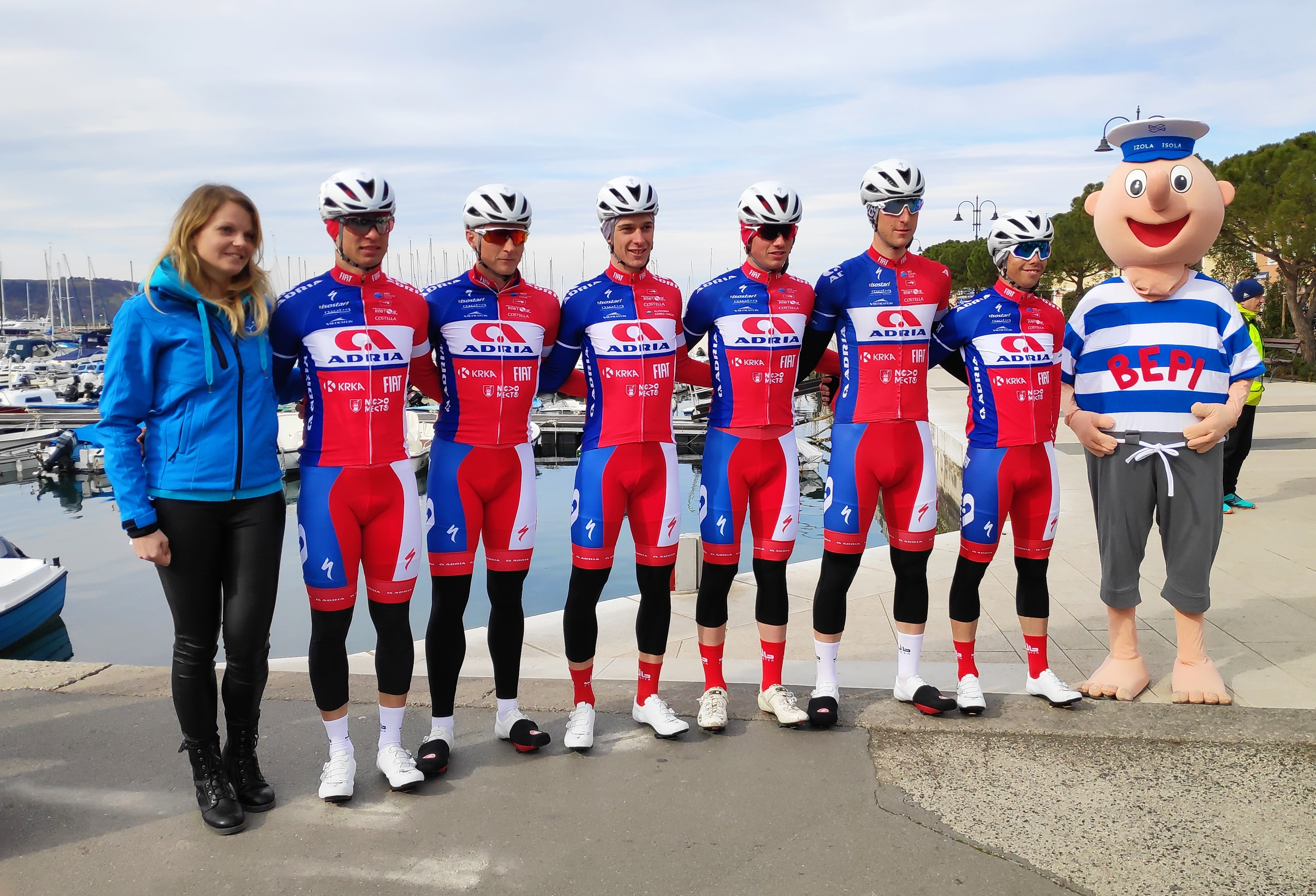
Adria Mobil in 2019 GP Izola, which was won by Marko Kump (second from left)

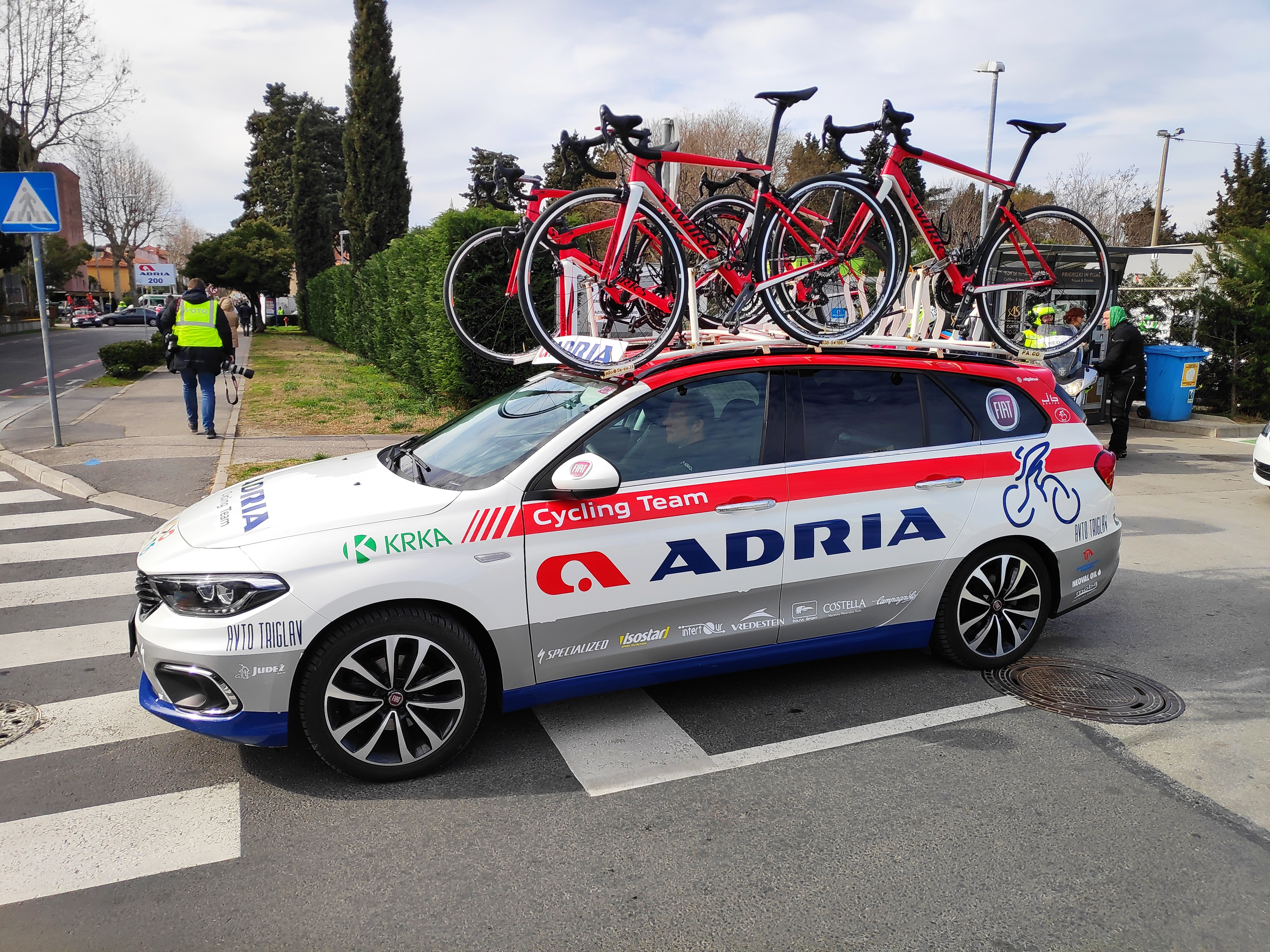
Fiat Tipo support car (2019)

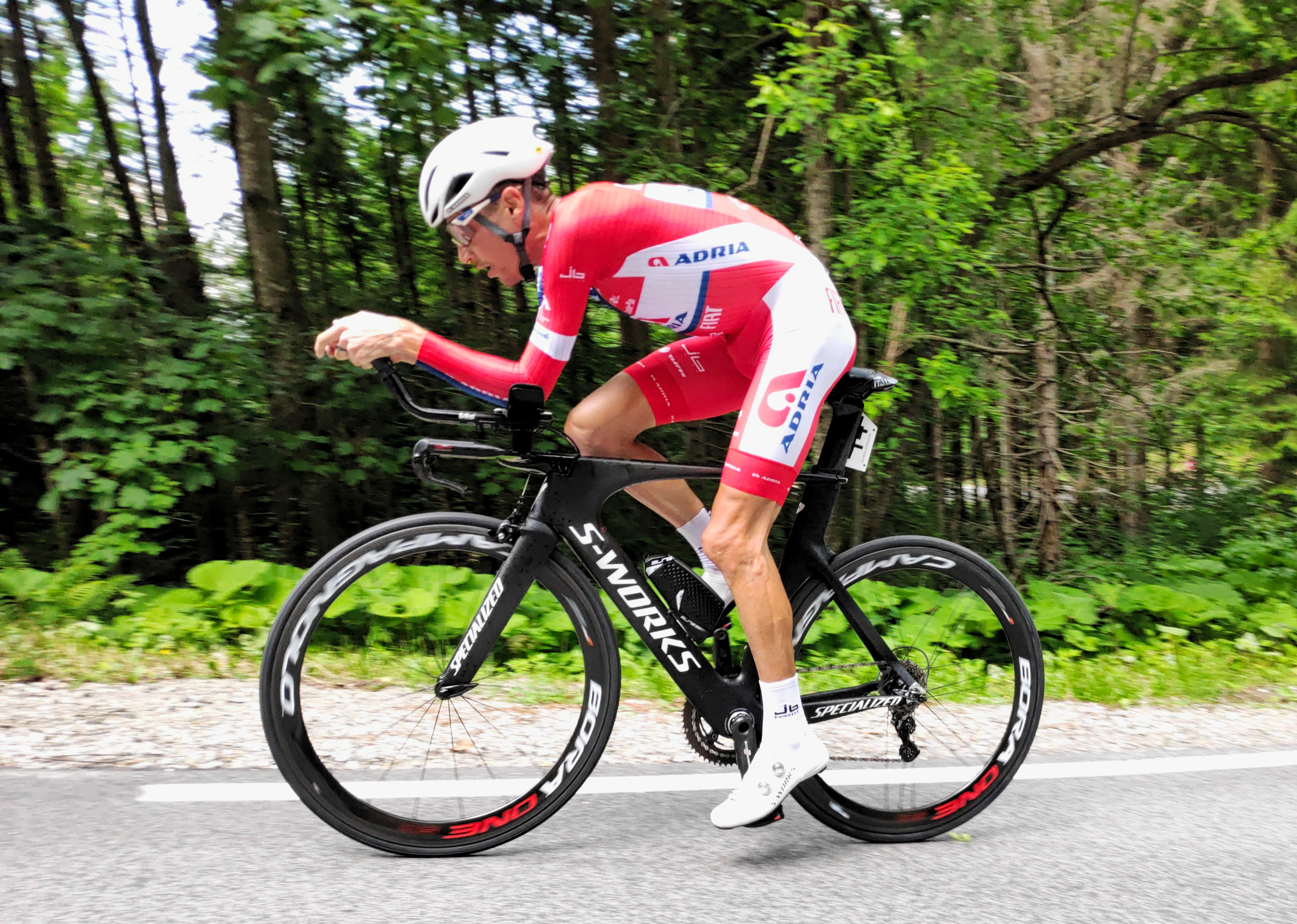
Janez Brajkovič at the 2020 Slovenian National Time Trial Championships

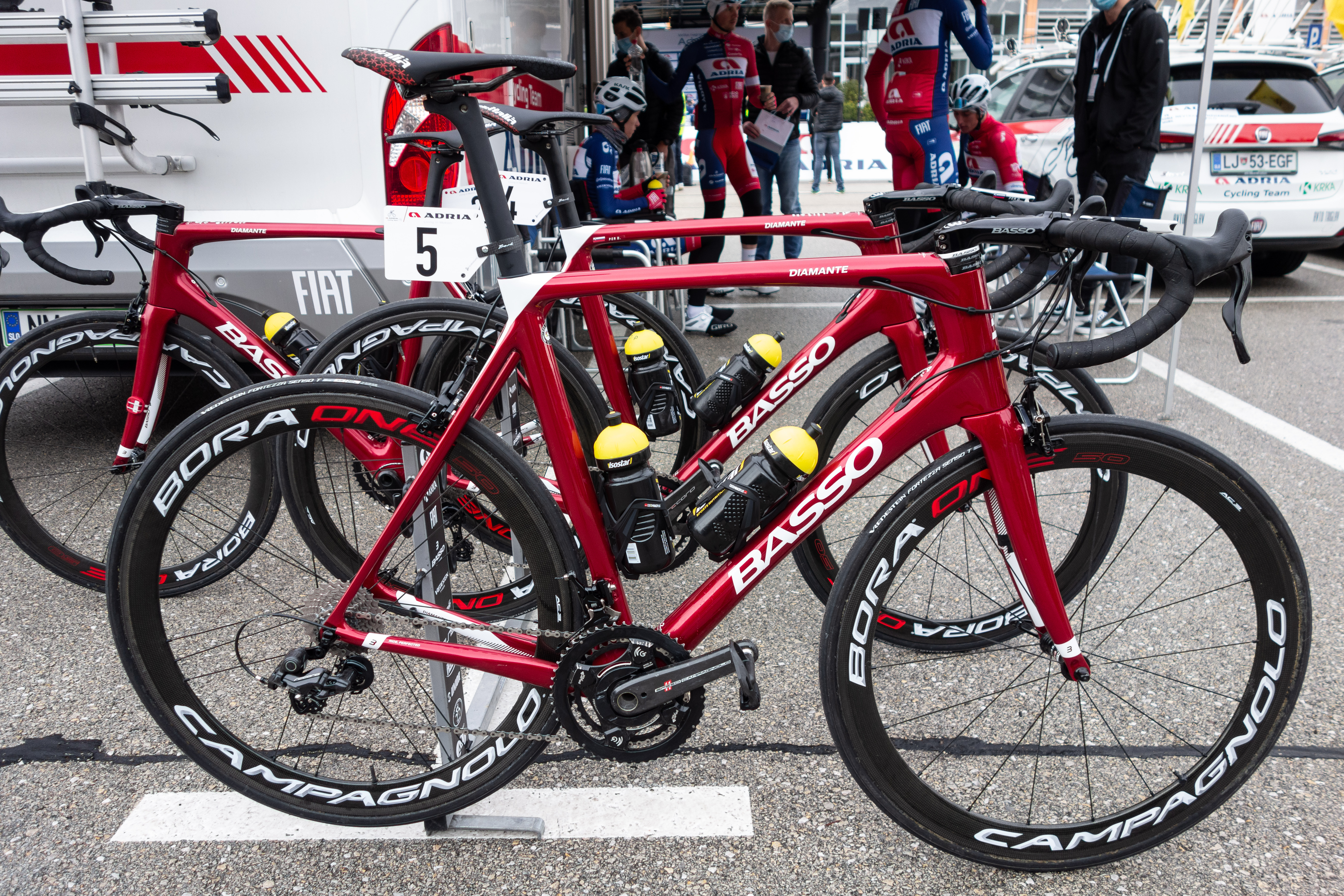
Basso Diamante (2021)

2005
Stage 3 Istrian Spring Trophy, Janez Brajkovič
Stage 6 Thüringen Rundfahrt der U23, Miha Švab
2006
Overall Tour of Slovenia, Tomaž Nose

Stage 2 & 3, Tomaž Nose

Poreč Trophy, Simon Špilak
2007
Poreč Trophy, Marko Kump
Gran Premio Palio del Recioto, Robert Kišerlovski
Overall Tour of Slovenia, Tomaž Nose
Prologue Tour de Croatie, Jure Zrimšek
2008
GP Kranj, Grega Bole
2009
Stage 1 Istrian Spring Trophy, Marko Kump
Stage 4 Tour of Slovenia, Marko Kump
Slovenian National Road Race Championships, Blaž Jarc
Ljubljana–Zagreb, Robert Vrečer
Stage 7 Tour of Hainan, Grega Bole
2010
Trofeo Zsšdi, Marko Kump
Poreč Trophy, Matej Gnezda
Stage 4 Settimana Internazionale di Coppi e Bartali, Marko Kump
GP Kranj, Matej Gnezda
2011
Poreč Trophy, Blaž Jarc
Ljubljana–Zagreb, Kristjan Fajt
2012
Poreč Trophy, Matej Mugerli
Stage 1 Istrian Spring Trophy, Marko Kump
Banja Luka–Beograd I, Marko Kump
Banja Luka–Beograd II, Matej Mugerli
Stage 1 Szlakiem Grodów Piastowskich, Marko Kump
Stage 4 Szlakiem Grodów Piastowskich, Radoslav Rogina
Grand Prix Südkärnten, Marko Kump
Central European Tour Budapest GP, Marko Kump
Ljubljana–Zagreb, Marko Kump
Tour of Vojvodina I, Kristjan Fajt
2013
Slovenia Time Trial Championships, Klemen Štimulak
Trofej Umag, Aljaž Hočevar
Poreč Trophy, Matej Mugerli
Overall Istrian Spring Trophy, Matej Mugerli

Stage 1, Matej Mugerli

GP Šenčur, Radoslav Rogina
Banja Luka–Beograd II, Matej Mugerli
Classic Beograd–Čačak, Matej Mugerli
Overall Tour of Slovenia, Radoslav Rogina

Stage 3, Radoslav Rogina

2014
Croatia Road Race Championships, Radoslav Rogina
Croatia Time Trial Championships, Bruno Maltar
Slovenia Road Race Championships, Matej Mugerli
Trofej Umag, Matej Mugerli
Gran Premio Industrie del Marmo, Matej Mugerli
Stage 2 Tour d'Azerbaïdjan, Primož Roglič
GP Judendorf-Strassengel, Radoslav Rogina
Giro del Medio Brenta, Klemen Štimulak
Overall Sibiu Cycling Tour, Radoslav Rogina

Stage 1, Radoslav Rogina

Croatia–Slovenia, Primož Roglič
2015
Trofej Umag, Marko Kump
Poreč Trophy, Marko Kump
Stage 3 Istrian Spring Trophy, Marko Kump
GP Adria Mobil, Marko Kump
Belgrade–Banja Luka I, Marko Kump
Stage 2 Tour of Croatia, Marko Kump
Overall Tour d'Azerbaïdjan, Primož Roglič

Stage 1, Marko Kump
Stage 2, Primož Roglič

Overall Tour of Małopolska, Marko Kump

Stages 1 & 2, Marko Kump

Overall Tour of Slovenia, Primož Roglič

Stage 3, Primož Roglič
Stage 4, Marko Kump

Overall Tour of Qinghai Lake, Radoslav Rogina

Stages 1, 2, 6, 9 & 12, Marko Kump
Stage 5, Primož Roglič

Croatia–Slovenia, Marko Kump
2016
GP Izola, Jure Golčer
Ronde van Vlaanderen U23, David Per
Slovenia Time Trial Championships, David Per
Croatia Road Race Championships, Radoslav Rogina
2017
Serbia Time Trial Championships, Dušan Rajović
Stage 2 Tour of Qinghai Lake, Dušan Rajović
Croatia–Slovenia, Dušan Rajović
2018
GP Izola, Dušan Rajović
Overall Belgrade–Banja Luka, Gašper Katrašnik

Stages 1 & 2, Gašper Katrašnik

Stage 4 Szlakiem Grodów Piastowskich, Gašper Katrašnik
Serbia Time Trial Championships, Dušan Rajović
Stage 10 Tour of Qinghai Lake, Dušan Rajović
Croatia–Slovenia, Dušan Rajović
2019
GP Izola, Marko Kump
International Rhodes Grand Prix, Dušan Rajović
Stage 1 International Tour of Rhodes, Dušan Rajović
GP Adria Mobil, Marko Kump
Stage 4 Belgrade–Banja Luka, Marko Kump
Stage 1 Tour of Bihor, Marko Kump
Stage 2 (ITT) Tour of Bihor, Dušan Rajović
GP Kranj, Marko Kump
Croatia–Slovenia, Marko Kump
Stage 1 CRO Race, Marko Kump
Stage 4 CRO Race, Dušan Rajović
2021
Croatia–Slovenia, Žiga Horvat
2022
Slovenia National Road Race Championships, Kristijan Koren

== National champions ==
2013
Slovenia Time Trial Klemen Štimulak
2014
Croatia Road Race Radoslav Rogina
Croatia Time Trial Bruno Maltar
Slovenia Road Race Matej Mugerli
2016
Slovenia Time Trial David Per
Croatia Road Race Radoslav Rogina
2017
Serbia Time Trial Dušan Rajović
2018
Serbia Time Trial Dušan Rajović
2022
Slovenia Road Race Kristjan Koren
