= Jože Valenčič =

Yugoslav cyclist

Personal information
- Born: 26 January 1948 (age 78) Ljubljana, FPR Yugoslavia

Cycling career
- Sport: Cycling

Jože Valenčič (born 26 January 1948) is a former Yugoslav cyclist. He competed in the individual road race and team time trial events at the 1972 Summer Olympics.
