= GP Kranj =

Annual road bicycle race in Kranj, Slovenia

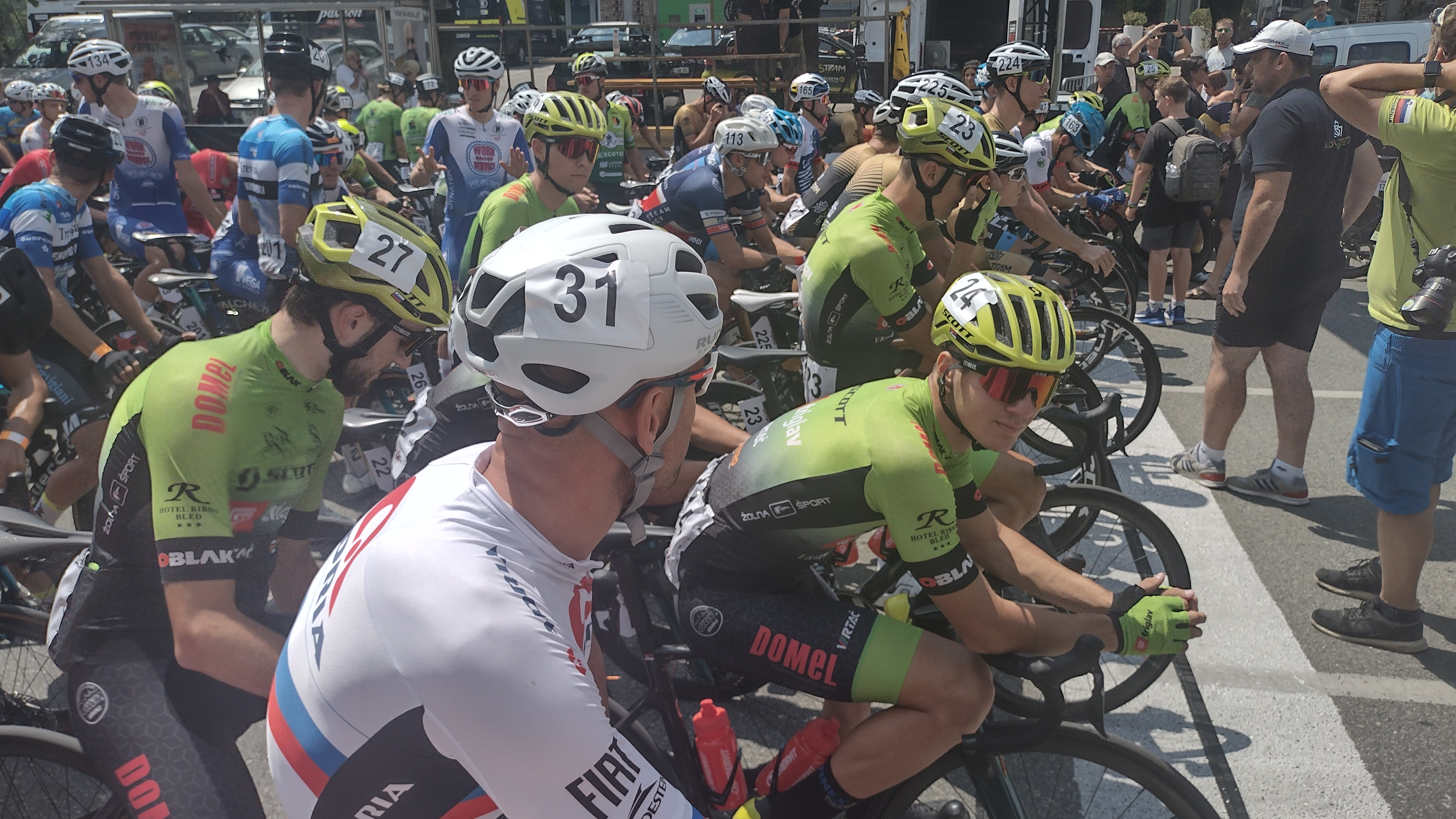

Race details
- Date: Early June
- Region: Kranj, Slovenia
- Local name: GP Kranj (in Slovene)
- Discipline: Road race
- Competition: UCI Europe Tour
- Type: Single-day
- Organiser: Kolesarski Klub Sava Kranj
- Web site: www.kklub-sava.si

History
- First edition: 1967
- Editions: 57 (as of 2025)
- First winner: Jože Valenčič (YUG)
- Most wins: Bojan Ropret (YUG) (4 wins)
- Most recent: José Juan Prieto (MEX)

GP Kranj is a single-day road bicycle race held annually in June in Kranj, Slovenia. Since 2011, the race is organized as a 1.2 event on the UCI Europe Tour. From 2007 to 2011, it held 1.1 status.

== Winners ==
Year	Country	Rider	Team
1967	Yugoslavia	Jože Valenčič	
1968	Yugoslavia	Franc Hvasti	
1969	Yugoslavia	Slavko Žagar	
1970	Yugoslavia	Rudi Valenčič	
1971	Yugoslavia	Franc Hvasti	
1972	Yugoslavia	Jože Valenčič	
1973	Yugoslavia	Franc Hvasti	
1974	Yugoslavia	Janez Končar	
1975	Yugoslavia	Janez Končar	
1976	Yugoslavia	Miro Rakuš	
1977	Yugoslavia	Bojan Ropret	
1978	Yugoslavia	Bojan Ropret	
1979	Yugoslavia	Bojan Udovič	
1980	No race		
1981	Yugoslavia	Bojan Ropret	
1982	Yugoslavia	Vinko Polončič	
1983	Yugoslavia	Bojan Ropret	
1984	Yugoslavia	Radomir Pavlovič	
1985	Yugoslavia	Jure Pavlič	
1986	Yugoslavia	Rajko Čubrič	
1987	Italy	Fabrizio Bontempi	
1988	Yugoslavia	Sandi Papež	
1989	Yugoslavia	Vladimir Brkovič	
1990	Yugoslavia	Robert Pintarič	
1991	Yugoslavia	Aleš Pagon	
1992	Slovenia	Sandi Papež	
1993	Slovenia	Robert Pintarič	
1994	Slovenia	Gorazd Štangelj	
1995	Slovenia	Bogdan Ravbar	
1996	Slovenia	Igor Kranjec	
1997	Slovenia	Martin Hvastija	
1998	Slovenia	Gorazd Štangelj	
1999	Slovenia	Igor Kranjec	
2000	Italy	Massimo Girardello	
2001	Italy	Daniele Masolino	
2002	Russia	Mikhail Timochine	
2003	Italy	Giorgio Orizio	
2004	Italy	Giovanni Visconti	
2005	Slovenia	Martin Hvastija	Perutnina Ptuj
2006	Slovenia	Boštjan Mervar	Perutnina Ptuj
2007	Slovenia	Borut Božič	Team LPR
2008	Slovenia	Grega Bole	Adria Mobil
2009	Slovenia	Gašper Švab	Sava
2010	Slovenia	Matej Gnezda	Adria Mobil
2011	Italy	Simone Ponzi	Liquigas–Cannondale
2012	No race		
2013	Austria	Lukas Pöstlberger	Gourmetfein–Simplon
2014	Slovenia	Jan Tratnik	Amplatz–BMC
2015	Hungary	Péter Kusztor	Amplatz–BMC
2016	Italy	Mattia De Marchi	Cycling Team Friuli
2017	Slovenia	Matej Mugerli	Amplatz–BMC
2018	Austria	Daniel Auer	WSA–Pushbikers
2019	Slovenia	Marko Kump	Adria Mobil
2020	Netherlands	Olav Kooij	Jumbo–Visma Development Team
2021	Italy	Riccardo Verza	Zalf Euromobil Fior
2022	Italy	Andrea Peron	Team Novo Nordisk
2023	Italy	Edoardo Zamperini	Zalf Euromobil Fior
2024	[[|]]	Roman Ermakov	CTF Victorious
2025	Mexico	José Juan Prieto	Petrolike
2026	No race due to financial reasons		
