= Sandi Papež =

Yugoslav cyclist

Personal information
- Born: 25 February 1965 (age 61) Novo Mesto, Yugoslavia

Cycling career
- Sport: Cycling

Sandi Papež (born 25 February 1965) is a Yugoslav former cyclist. He competed in the team time trial at the 1988 Summer Olympics.
