= Nevenko Valčić =

Yugoslav cyclist

Personal information
- Nickname: Nevio
- Born: 1 January 1933 Loborika, Marčana
- Died: 3 February 2007 (aged 74) Pula
- Height: 174 cm (5 ft 9 in)
- Weight: 74 kg (163 lb)

Cycling career
- Sport: Cycling

Nevenko "Nevio" Valčić (1 January 1933 – 3 February 2007) was a Croatian cyclist who competed for Yugoslavia. He competed in the individual road race and team time trial events at the 1960 Summer Olympics.
