= Tour of Vojvodina =

Road cycling race

Race details
- Date: September
- Region: Serbia
- Discipline: Road
- Competition: UCI Europe Tour
- Type: One-day race

History
- First edition: 2006
- Editions: 5
- Final edition: 2012
- First winner: Jure Kocjan (SLO); Gregor Gazvoda (SLO)
- Most wins: No repeat winners
- Final winner: Kristjan Fajt (SLO); Clemens Fankhauser (AUT)

The Tour of Vojvodina was a road cycling race held in Serbia. The race consisted of two one day races. It was part of UCI Europe Tour in category 1.2.

== Winners ==
=== Tour of Vojvodina I ===
Year	Country	Rider	Team
2006	Slovenia	Jure Kocjan	Radenska–PowerBar
2008	Slovenia	Robert Vrečer	Radenska–KD Financial Point
2009	Slovenia	Matej Marin	Perutnina Ptuj
2011	Slovenia	Gregor Gazvoda	Perutnina Ptuj
2012	Slovenia	Kristjan Fajt	Adria Mobil

=== Tour of Vojvodina II ===
Year	Country	Rider	Team
2008	Slovenia	Gregor Gazvoda	Perutnina Ptuj
2009	Bulgaria	Ivailo Gabrovski	Heraklion–Nessebar
2011	Serbia	Žolt Dér	
2012	Austria	Clemens Fankhauser	Tirol Cycling Team
