= Vinko Polončič =

Yugoslav cyclist

Personal information
- Born: 13 July 1957 (age 69) Ljubljana, Yugoslavia

Cycling career
- Sport: Cycling
- Current team: Kamen Pazin
- Discipline: Road
- Role: Rider (retired); Team manager; Directeur sportif

Professional team
- 1983–1984: Malvor–Bottecchia

Managerial team
- 2010–: Meridiana–Kamen

Vinko Polončič (born 13 July 1957) is a Yugoslav former cyclist. He competed in the individual road race and team time trial events at the 1980 Summer Olympics. He ranked 3rd in the 1983 Giro di Puglia, and 4th in the 1981 GP Capodarco.

He now works as a directeur sportif for UCI Continental team Kamen Pazin.
