= Bojan Ropret =

Slovene cyclist

Personal information
- Born: 17 August 1957 (age 69) Kranj, Yugoslavia

Cycling career
- Sport: Cycling

Bojan Ropret (born 17 August 1957) is a former Slovene cyclist. He competed for Yugoslavia at the 1976, 1980 and 1984 Summer Olympics.

== Major results ==
1983
Mediterranean Games

Road Race
Team Trial
