= Poreč Classic =

Croatian one-day road cycling race

Race details
- Date: Early March
- Region: Istria, Croatia
- English name: Poreč Classic
- Local name: Trofej Poreč
- Discipline: Road race
- Competition: UCI Europe Tour
- Type: Single-day

History
- First edition: 2000
- Editions: 27 (as of 2026)
- First winner: Endrio Leoni (ITA)
- Most wins: Matej Mugerli (SLO) (4 wins)
- Most recent: Viggo Moore (USA)

The Poreč Classic (formerly known as Poreč Trophy, Trofej Plava Laguna, G. P. Istria, Trophy Riviera and G.P. Umag) is a road bicycle race held annually near the town of Poreč, in the Istrian peninsula, Croatia. It is organized as a 1.2 event on the UCI Europe Tour. The race originally consisted of five challenges (six in 2002); since 2004, the event consists of a single race.

== Poreč Trophy ==
=== Winners ===
Year	Country	Rider	Team
2000	Italy	Endrio Leoni	Alessio
2001	Croatia	Vladimir Miholjević	KRKA–Telekom Slovenije
2002	Ukraine	Volodymyr Bileka	Landbouwkrediet–Colnago
2003	Italy	Angelo Ciccone	Marchiol Frezza Safi-Site
2004	Slovenia	Matej Stare	Perutnina Ptuj
2005	Austria	Jochen Summer	Elk Haus–Simplon
2006	Slovenia	Simon Špilak	Adria Mobil
2007	Slovenia	Marko Kump	Adria Mobil
2008	Slovenia	Aldo Ino Ilešič	Sava
2009	Norway	Ole Haavardsholm	Joker–Bianchi
2010	Slovenia	Matej Gnezda	Adria Mobil
2011	Slovenia	Blaž Jarc	Adria Mobil
2012	Slovenia	Matej Mugerli	Adria Mobil
2013	Slovenia	Matej Mugerli	Adria Mobil
2014	Ukraine	Maksym Averin	Synergy Baku
2015	Slovenia	Marko Kump	Adria Mobil
2016	Slovenia	Matej Mugerli	Synergy Baku
2017	Slovenia	Matej Mugerli	Amplatz–BMC
2018	Latvia	Emīls Liepiņš	ONE Pro Cycling
2019	Switzerland	Fabian Lienhard	IAM–Excelsior
2020	Netherlands	Olav Kooij	Jumbo–Visma Development Team
2021	Italy	Filippo Fiorelli	Bardiani–CSF–Faizanè
2022	Serbia	Dušan Rajović	Team Corratec
2023	Poland	Patryk Stosz	Voster ATS Team
2024	Great Britain	Matthew Brennan	Visma–Lease a Bike Development
2025	Italy	Matteo Milan	Lidl–Trek Future Racing
2026	United States	Viggo Moore	Tirol KTM Cycling Team

== Challenge races ==
=== Poreč Trophy 2 ===
Year	Country	Rider	Team
2000	Italy	Endrio Leoni	Alessio
2001	Slovenia	Zoran Klemencic	Tacconi Sport–Vini Caldirola
2002	Ukraine	Yaroslav Popovych	Landbouwkrediet–Colnago
2003	Slovenia	Boštjan Mervar	Perutnina Ptuj

=== Poreč Trophy 3 ===
Year	Country	Rider	Team
2000	Italy	Flavio Zandarin	Alessio
2001	Estonia	Andrus Aug	Amore & Vita–Beretta
2002	Slovenia	Boštjan Mervar	KRKA–Telekom Slovenije
2003	Belgium	Alexey Shchebelin	

=== Poreč Trophy 4 ===
Year	Country	Rider	Team
2000	Slovenia	Martin Hvastija	Alessio
2001	Germany	Jan Bratkowski	De Nardi–Pasta Montegrappa
2002	Estonia	Andrus Aug	De Nardi–Pasta Montegrappa

=== Poreč Trophy 5 ===
Year	Country	Rider	Team
2000	Czech Republic	Tomas Konečný	Wüstenrot–ZVVZ
2001	Czech Republic	Lubor Tesař	Wüstenrot–ZVVZ
2002	Croatia	Hrvoje Miholjević	

=== Poreč Trophy 6 ===
Year	Country	Rider	Team
2002	New Zealand	Fraser MacMaster	Volksbank–Ideal
