= Raiffeisen Grand Prix =

Austrian one-day road cycling race

Race details
- Date: June (until 2015); September (from 2016)
- Region: Styria
- Discipline: road
- Competition: UCI Europe Tour
- Type: One day race
- Web site: www.rc-judendorf.at

History
- First edition: 1996
- Editions: 23
- Final edition: 2019
- First winner: Luca Sironi (ITA)
- Most wins: Igor Kranjec (SLO); Riccardo Zoidl (AUT); Maciej Paterski (POL) (2 wins)
- Final winner: Maciej Paterski (POL)

The Raiffeisen Grand Prix was a cycling race held annually in Austria between 1996 and 2019. It was held as part of the UCI Europe Tour as a category 1.2 race.

== Winners ==
Year	Country	Rider	Team
1996	Italy	Luca Sironi	
1997	Italy	Simone Simonetti	
1998	Slovenia	Igor Kranjec	
1999	Slovenia	Igor Kranjec	
2000	Austria	Josef Lontscharitsch	
2001	Germany	Jan Bratkowski	
2002	Slovenia	Boštjan Mervar	
2003	Austria	Georg Totschnig	Gerolsteiner
2004	Austria	Andreas Matzbacher	Saeco
2005	Poland	Krzysztof Ciesielski	
2006	Slovenia	Mitja Mahorič	Perutnina Ptuj
2007	Austria	Christian Pfannberger	Elk Haus–Simplon
2008	Slovenia	Matej Stare	Perutnina Ptuj
2009	Austria	Markus Eibegger	Elk Haus
2010	Austria	Matthias Brändle	Footon–Servetto–Fuji
2011	Croatia	Tomislav Dančulović	Loborika Favorit Team
2012	No race		
2013	Austria	Riccardo Zoidl	Gourmetfein–Simplon
2014	Croatia	Radoslav Rogina	Adria Mobil
2015	Austria	Gregor Mühlberger	Team Felbermayr–Simplon Wels
2016	Austria	Riccardo Zoidl	Trek–Segafredo
2017	Canada	Adam de Vos	Rally Cycling
2018	Poland	Maciej Paterski	Wibatech Merx 7R
2019	Poland	Maciej Paterski	Wibatech Merx 7R
