= The Paths of King Nikola =

Montenegrin bicycle race

Race details
- Date: Late-March
- Region: Montenegro
- English name: The Paths of King Nikola
- Discipline: Road race
- Competition: UCI Europe Tour
- Type: Stage race

History
- First edition: 2002
- Editions: 16 (as of 2010)
- First winner: (Italy) Ivan Denobile
- Most wins: (Croatia) Radoslav Rogina (Slovenia) Mitja Mahorič (3 wins)
- Most recent: (Bulgaria) Vladimir Koev

The Paths of King Nikola was a road bicycle race held annually in Montenegro. The name is a reference to King Nikola I (1841–1921), the ruler of the Principality of Montenegro. The first edition was in 2002; since 2005, it is organized as a 2.2 event on the UCI Europe Tour.

== Winners ==
Year	Country	Rider	Team
2002	Italy	Ivan De Nobile	Aran Cucine Cantina Tollo
2003	Croatia	Radoslav Rogina	Perutnina Ptuj
2004	Croatia	Massimo Demarin	Perutnina Ptuj
2005	Slovenia	Mitja Mahorič	Perutnina Ptuj
2006	Croatia	Radoslav Rogina	Perutnina Ptuj
2007	Slovenia	Mitja Mahorič	Perutnina Ptuj
2008	Slovenia	Mitja Mahorič	Perutnina Ptuj
2009	Croatia	Radoslav Rogina	Perutnina Ptuj
2010	Bulgaria	Vladimir Koev	Hemus 1896-Vivelo
2011	No race due to an insufficient amount of safety measures taken by the race organisers		
