= Tour of Qinghai Lake =

Annual cycling event in Qinghai, China

Race details
- Date: July
- Region: Qinghai Province, China
- Local name: 环青海湖国际公路自行车赛 (in Chinese)
- Discipline: Road
- Competition: UCI ProSeries
- Type: Stage race
- Organiser: Chinese Cycling Association
- Web site: www.tdql.cn

History
- First edition: 2002
- Editions: 24 (as of 2026)
- First winner: Tom Danielson (USA)
- Most wins: Henok Mulubrhan (ERI) (2 wins)
- Most recent: Jonathan Caicedo (ECU)

The Tour of Qinghai Lake is an annual professional road bicycle racing stage race held in the Qinghai province of China since 2002 and is named after Qinghai Lake. The race is sanctioned by the International Cycling Union (UCI) as a 2.HC race as part of the UCI Asia Tour. The race was to become part of the new UCI ProSeries in 2020, although the event in 2020 was cancelled due to the COVID-19 pandemic. The 2021 and 2022 events were held as a class 2.2 race with all domestic teams due to the international travel restrictions during the pandemic. The race returned to the UCI ProSeries in 2023.

== Past winners ==
=== General classification ===
Year	Country	Rider	Team
2002	United States	Tom Danielson	Mercury Cycling Team
2003	Italy	Damiano Cunego	Italy (national team)
2004	South Africa	Ryan Cox	Barloworld
2005	Czech Republic	Martin Mareš	eD'system - ZVVZ
2006	Netherlands	Maarten Tjallingii	Skil–Shimano
2007	Italy	Gabriele Missaglia	Diquigiovanni–Selle Italia
2008	United States	Tyler Hamilton	Rock Racing
2009	Kazakhstan	Andrey Mizurov	Tabriz Petrochemical Team
2010	Iran	Hossein Askari	Tabriz Petrochemical Team
2011	Slovenia	Gregor Gazvoda	Perutnina Ptuj
2012	Iran	Hossein Alizadeh	Tabriz Petrochemical Team
2013	Iran	Samad Pourseyedi	Tabriz Petrochemical Team
2014 (Note: The initial winner of the 2014 edition, Kazakhstan's Ilya Davidenok (Continental Team Astana), was disqualified for failing a doping test.)	Ukraine	Mykhaylo Kononenko	Kolss Cycling Team
2015	Croatia	Radoslav Rogina	Adria Mobil
2016	Ukraine	Sergiy Lagkuti	Kolss BDC Team
2017	Venezuela	Jonathan Monsalve	Qinghai Tianyoude Cycling Team
2018	Colombia	Hernán Aguirre	Team Manzana Postobón
2019	Colombia	Robinson Chalapud	Medellín
2020	No race		
2021	China	Zhang Zhishan	Tianyoude Hotel Cycling Team
2022	China	Liu Jiankun	Pingtan International Tourism Island Cycling Team
2023	Eritrea	Henok Mulubrhan	Green Project–Bardiani–CSF–Faizanè
2024	Ecuador	Jefferson Alveiro Cepeda	Caja Rural–Seguros RGA
2025	Eritrea	Henok Mulubrhan	XDS Astana Team
2026	Ecuador	Jonathan Caicedo	Wheeltop Rotor Chengdu Team
