= Belgrade–Banja Luka =

Road cycling race

Race details
- Date: April
- Region: Serbia and Bosnia and Herzegovina
- Discipline: Road race
- Competition: UCI Europe Tour
- Type: Stage race
- Organiser: AFS
- Race director: Vladimir Kuvalja

History
- First edition: 2007
- Editions: 20 (as of 2026)
- First winner: Matej Gnezda (SLO)
- Most wins: Marko Kump (SLO); Matej Mugerli (SLO); Jakub Kaczmarek (POL); (2 wins each)
- Most recent: Dušan Rajović (SRB)

Belgrade–Banja Luka is a road bicycle race held annually since 2007 in Serbia and Bosnia and Herzegovina respectively. Until 2017, it is made up of two one-day races: Belgrade–Banja Luka I and Belgrade–Banja Luka II, which were both organized as category 1.2 events on the UCI Europe Tour. Since 2018 it has been held as one stage race, as a category 2.1 event from 2018 to 2022 and 2.2 since 2023.

== About ==
Belgrade Banja Luka started for the first time in 2007, and it has been included in the calendar of the World Cycling Union "UCI" the same year. The race attracted a large number of teams from all over the world, and today it's a universal event and one of the largest sporting events in Bosnia and Herzegovina and Serbia. The Belgrade Banja Luka Race is an event of the highest public interest for the promotion of sports in Republika Srpska and Serbia. The race was declared by the Republic of Serbia Government and the Government of the "Republika Srpska" to be an event of the highest importance for the Republika Srpska and Serbia. Small Chronology of Event: 2019: 16 cities and municipalities were involved in the race. Increased number of stages from two (2) to four stages (4)

2018: The race is listed in the first international event category of UCI 2.1, which indicates that today it is ranked with the largest races in the world such as "Tour de France", "Giro d'Italia" ... 2017: A record number of media and broadcasters transmit and report from the Race. A total of 8 broadcasters and 80 journalists from home and abroad. The viewership of the Race was 8% in the country and 4% abroad. The same year the Race was declared as the largest media sporting event. 2016: RTRS broadcasts the race live for the first time. The viewership index was 10% in BiH, which means that the broadcast was watched by over 300,000 people, while the viewership index in the region was 2%, which indicates that the race was followed by 0.5 million people.

2015: A record was broken in the number of participating countries and the number of riders: 190 riders from 30 countries. The race entered the hundred (100) best organized cycling events of all time and it was qualified for the 2016 Rio Olympics • 2014: Award for the biggest sports event in Banja Luka. • 2013: Entering the top ten races in the world for 2013. • 2012: Breaking the record of the former Yugoslavia with 182 starters from 25 countries. • 2011: The title of the fastest UCI race in the world in 2011. • 2010: Breaking the live event record for one sporting event, 60,000 people followed the race. • 2009: The race enters the professional category with over 75% of professional teams from all over the world. • 2008: 9 Mayors and 3 Ministers of Sport from Serbia, Republika Srpska and Slovenia attended opening ceremony for the Race.

== Winners ==
=== Belgrade–Banja Luka I ===
Year	Country	Rider	Team
2007	Serbia	Žolt Dér	P-Nivo
2008	Slovenia	Aldo Ino Ilešič	Sava
2009	Latvia	Normunds Lasis	Cycling Club Bourgas
2010	Slovenia	Jure Zrimšek	Sava
2011	Hungary	Krisztian Lovassy	Ora Hotels
2012	Slovenia	Marko Kump	Adria Mobil
2013	Slovakia	Michael Kolář	Dukla Trenčín–Trek
2014	Slovenia	Martin Otoničar	Radenska
2015	Slovenia	Marko Kump	Adria Mobil
2016	Ukraine	Vitaliy Buts	Kolss BDC Team
2017	Hungary	Barnabás Peák	Kontent–DKSI

=== Belgrade–Banja Luka II ===
Year	Country	Rider	Team
2010	Slovenia	Matej Marin	Perutnina Ptuj
2011	Croatia	Matija Kvasina	Loborika Favorit Team
2012	Slovenia	Matej Mugerli	Adria Mobil
2013	Slovenia	Matej Mugerli	Adria Mobil
2014	Serbia	Ivan Stević	Racing Cycles-Kastro Team
2015	Slovenia	Andi Bajc	Amplatz–BMC
2016	Italy	Filippo Fortin	GM Europa Ovini
2017	Italy	Nicola Gaffurini	Sangemini–MG.K Vis

=== Belgrade–Banja Luka ===
Year	Country	Rider	Team
2018	Slovenia	Gašper Katrašnik	Adria Mobil
2019	Poland	Paweł Franczak	Voster ATS Team
2020	Poland	Jakub Kaczmarek	Mazowsze Serce Polski
2021	Estonia	Mihkel Räim	Mazowsze Serce Polski
2022	Poland	Jakub Kaczmarek	HRE Mazowsze Serce Polski
2023	Slovenia	Gregor Matija Černe	mebloJOGI Pro-concrete
2024	Poland	Piotr Pekala	Santic–Wibatech
2025	Serbia	Dušan Rajović	Serbia (national team)
