= Vuelta a Cuba =

Cycling race

Race details
- Date: Mid-February
- Region: Cuba
- Discipline: Road
- Competition: UCI America Tour
- Type: Stage race

History
- First edition: 1964
- Editions: 35 (as of 2010)
- Final edition: 2010
- First winner: Sergio Martínez (CUB)
- Most wins: Eduardo Alonso (CUB) (6 Wins)
- Final winner: Arnold Alcolea (CUB)

The Vuelta a Cuba (English: Tour of Cuba) was a multi-day road bicycle racing stage race held annually each February in Cuba. It was held from 1964 to 2010. When the UCI Continental Circuits were created in 2005, the Vuelta a Cuba was added to the UCI America Tour schedule.

== Past winners ==
Year	Winner	Country	Team
1964	Sergio "Pipián" Martínez	Cuba	Matanzas
1965	Rodolfo Noriega	Cuba	Cotorro
1966	Sergio "Pipián" Martínez (2)	Cuba	Matanzas
1967	Henryk Kowalski	Poland	Poland
1968	Sergio "Pipián" Martínez (3)	Cuba	Cuba
1969	Sergio "Pipián" Martínez (4)	Cuba	Cuba
1970	No Event		
1971	Raúl Vázquez	Cuba	Cuba
1972	Aldo "Búfalo" Arencibia	Cuba	Cuba
1973	Leonardo Hernández	Cuba	Las Villas
1974	Carlos Cardet	Cuba	Cuba
1975	No Event		
1976	Aldo "Búfalo" Arencibia (2)	Cuba	Cuba
1977	Carlos Cardet (2)	Cuba	Cuba
1978	Serguei Sujorochenkov	Soviet Union	Cuba
1979	Carlos Cardet (3)	Cuba	Cuba
1980	Aldo "Búfalo" Arencibia (3)	Cuba	Habana
1981	Jorge A. Pérez	Cuba	Cuba
1982	No Event		
1983	Olaf Jentszch	East Germany	Germany A
1984	Eduardo Alonso	Cuba	Cuba
1985	Alexander Zinoviev	Soviet Union	URSS A
1986	Eduardo Alonso (2)	Cuba	Cuba A
1987	Eduardo Alonso (3)	Cuba	Cuba A
1988	Eduardo Alonso (4)	Cuba	Cuba
1989	Eduardo Alonso (5)	Cuba	Cuba A
1990	Eduardo Alonso (6)	Cuba	Cuba
1991- 1999	No Event		
2000	Pedro Pablo Pérez	Cuba	Cuba
2001	Pedro Pablo Pérez (2)	Cuba	Cuba
2002	Filippo Pozzato	Italy	Mapei-Quick Step
2003	Todd Herriot	United States	UPMC Fuji
2004	Pedro Pablo Pérez (3)	Cuba	Cuba
2005	Damier Martinez	Cuba	Cuba A
2006	Pedro Pablo Pérez (4)	Cuba	Cuba
2007	Svein Tuft	Canada	Symmetrics Cycling Team
2008	Pedro Pablo Pérez (5)	Cuba	Cuba
2009	Arnold Alcolea	Cuba	Cuba
2010	Arnold Alcolea (2)	Cuba	Cuba
