= Croatia–Slovenia =

One-day road cycling race

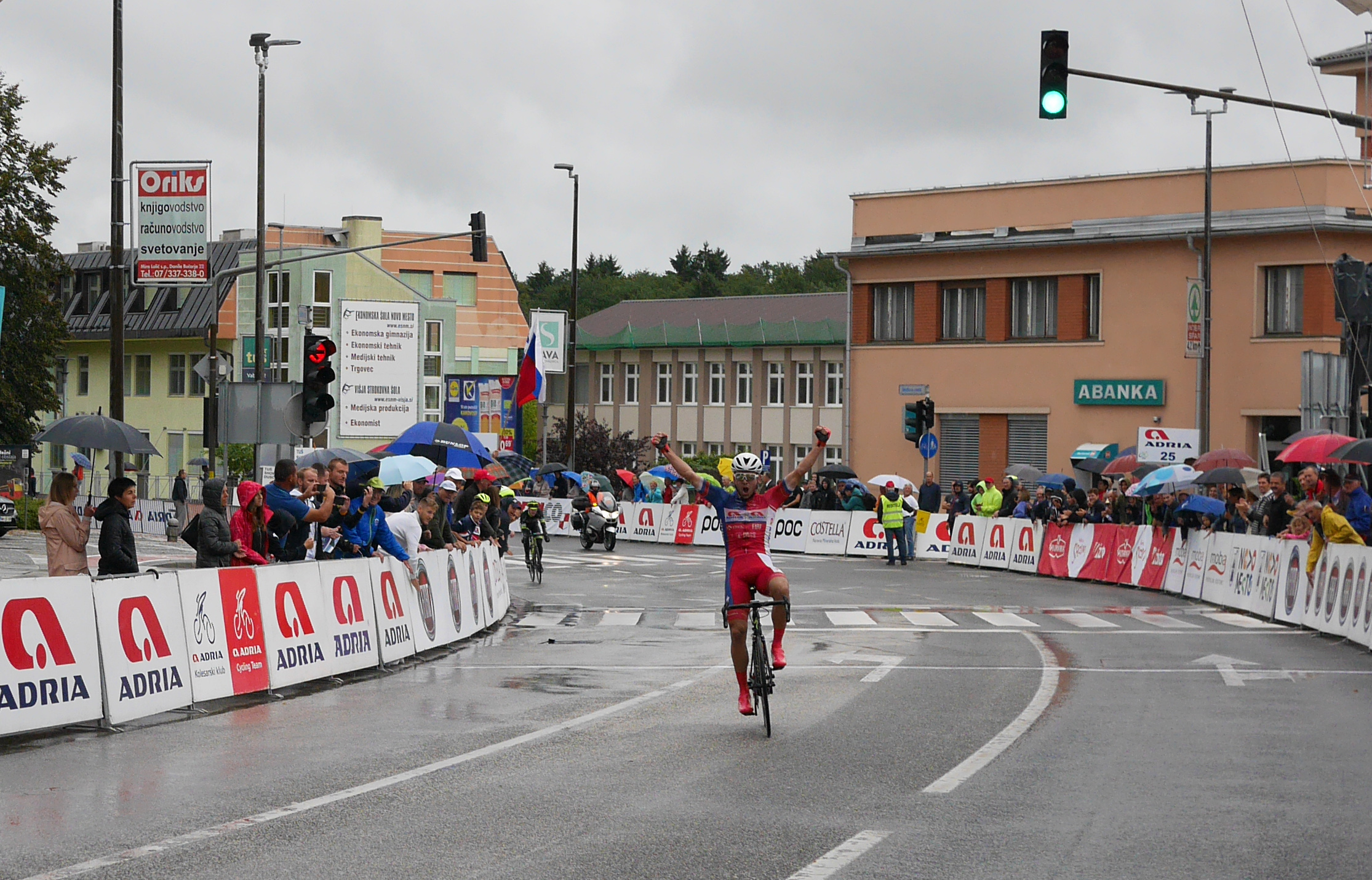
- Dušan Rajović passing finish line (2018)

Race details
- Date: August
- Region: Zagreb and Novo Mesto
- Discipline: Road
- Competition: UCI Europe Tour
- Type: One day race
- Web site: www.adria-mobil-cycling.com/si

History
- First edition: 2008
- Editions: 13 (as of 2021)
- First winner: Robert Vrečer (SLO)
- Most wins: Marko Kump (SLO) (3 wins)
- Most recent: Žiga Horvat (SLO)

Croatia–Slovenia is a one-day cycling race that has been held annually since 2008. It is part of UCI Europe Tour in category 1.2. It was formerly known as Ljubljana-Zagreb and Zagreb-Ljubljana, but the new finish line had moved from Ljubljana to Novo Mesto.

== Winners ==
Year	Country	Rider	Team
2008	Slovenia	Robert Vrečer	Radenska–KD Financial Point
2009	Slovenia	Robert Vrečer	Adria Mobil
2010	Slovenia	Matej Mugerli	Adria Mobil
2011	Slovenia	Kristjan Fajt	Adria Mobil
2012	Slovenia	Marko Kump	Adria Mobil
2013	Austria	Riccardo Zoidl	Gourmetfein–Simplon
2014	Slovenia	Primož Roglič	Adria Mobil
2015	Slovenia	Marko Kump	Adria Mobil
2016	Germany	Jannik Steimle	Team Felbermayr–Simplon Wels
2017	Serbia	Dušan Rajović	Adria Mobil
2018	Serbia	Dušan Rajović	Adria Mobil
2019	Slovenia	Marko Kump	Adria Mobil
2020	No race due to coronavirus pandemic		
2021	Slovenia	Žiga Horvat	Adria Mobil
