= 2003 Tour of Slovenia =

UCI‑2.5 race

Race details
- Dates: 6–11 May 2003
- Stages: 6
- Distance: 1,038 km (645 mi)
- Winning time: 25h 12' 18"

Results
Jersey awarded to the overall winner	Winner	(Slovenia) Mitja Mahorič
	Second	(Slovenia) Jure Golčer
	Third	(Austria) Andreas Matzbacher
Jersey awarded to the points classification winner	Points	(Slovenia) Boštjan Mervar
Jersey awarded to the mountains classification winner	Mountains	(Switzerland) Christian Heule
Jersey awarded to the young rider classification winner	Young rider	(Austria) Andreas Matzbacher
Jersey awarded to the sprints classification winner	Sprints	(Slovenia) Aldo Ino Ilešič
	Team	(Switzerland) Team Macandina

The 2003 Tour of Slovenia (Slovene: Dirka po Sloveniji) was the 9th edition of the Tour of Slovenia, categorized as UCI‑2.5 stage race held between 6 and 11 May 2003.

The race consisted of 6 stages with 1,038 km (645.0 mi) in total.

== Teams ==
Total 108 riders (80 finished it) from 19 teams started the race.

=== Professional ===
- (Slovenia) Perutnina Ptuj
- (Austria) Volksbank–Ideal
- (Austria) Elk Haus Sportunion Schrems
- (Netherlands) Van Hemert Groep Cycling Team
- (Switzerland) Team Macandina
- (Bulgaria) Miche
- (Poland) Amore & Vita–Beretta
- (Belgium) Quick-Step–Davitamon
- (Japan) Nippon Hodo

=== Amateur ===
- (Slovenia) Radenska Rog
- (Slovenia) TBP Lenart
- (Slovenia) Sava Kranj
- (Slovenia) Krka Novo mesto
- (Slovenia) Perutnina Ptuj U23
- (Slovenia) STA
- (Croatia) Kamen Pazin

=== National ===
- Austria
- Slovakia
- Germany

== Route and stages ==
Stage characteristics and winners
Stage	Date	Course	Length	Type	Winner
1	6 May	Čatež – Ptuj	167 km (104 mi)	Plain stage	(Slovenia) Jure Zrimšek
2	7 May	Ormož – Beltinci	168 km (104 mi)	Plain stage	(Slovenia) Leon Makarovič
3	8 May	Lenart – Ljubljana	203 km (126 mi)	Intermediate stage	(Slovenia) Aldo Ino Ilešič
4	9 May	Vrhnika – Kranj	176 km (109 mi)	Intermediate stage	(Switzerland) Christian Heule
5	10 May	Grosuplje – Vršič	168 km (104 mi)	Mountain stage	(Slovenia) Jure Golčer
6	11 May	Šentjernej – Novo mesto	156 km (97 mi)	Plain stage	(Slovenia) Boštjan Mervar
Total		1,038 km (645.0 mi)			

== Classification leadership ==
Classification leadership by stage
Stage	Winner	General classification	Points classification	Mountains classification	Young rider classification	Intermediate sprints classification	Team classification
1	Jure Zrimšek	Jure Zrimšek	not available	not available	not available	not available	not available
2	Leon Makarovič	Leon Makarovič	not available	not available	not available	not available	not available
3	Aldo Ino Ilešič	Leon Makarovič	not available	not available	not available	not available	not available
4	Christian Heule	Christian Heule	not available	not available	not available	not available	not available
5	Jure Golčer	Mitja Mahorič	not available	not available	not available	not available	not available
6	Boštjan Mervar	Mitja Mahorič	Boštjan Mervar	Christian Heule	Aldo Ino Ilešič	Andreas Matzbacher	Macandina
Final		Mitja Mahorič	Boštjan Mervar	Christian Heule	Aldo Ino Ilešič	Andreas Matzbacher	Team Macandina

== Final classification standings ==
Legend
Denotes the leader of the general classification	Denotes the leader of the mountains classification
Denotes the leader of the points classification	Denotes the leader of the young rider classification
Denotes the winner of the int. sprints classification	Denotes the leader of the team classification

=== General classification ===
Rank	Rider	Team	Time
1	(Slovenia) Mitja Mahorič	Perutnina Ptuj	25h 12' 18"
2	(Slovenia) Jure Golčer	Volksbank	+ 4"
3	(Austria) Andreas Matzbacher	Austria	+ 28"
4	(Croatia) Massimo Demarin	Perutnina Ptuj	+ 34"
5	(Netherlands) Stef Clement	Van Hemert Groep Cycling Team	+ 54"
6	(Zimbabwe) Timothy Jones	Amore & Vita	+ 1' 13"
7	(Belgium) Johan Van Summeren	Quick.step Davitamon	+ 1' 31"
8	(Italy) Renzo Mazzoleni	Team Macandina	+ 1' 36"
9	(Austria) Harald Totschnig	Austria	+ 1' 43"
10	(Croatia) Radoslav Rogina	Perutnina Ptuj	+ 1' 47"

=== Points classification ===
Rank	Rider	Team	Points
1	(Slovenia) Boštjan Mervar	Perutnina Ptuj	73
2	(Slovenia) Matic Strgar	Radenska Rog	51
3	(Slovenia) Jure Golčer	Volksbank	45
4	(Slovenia) Aldo Ino Ilešič	Perutnina Ptuj U23	44
5	(Zimbabwe) Timothy Jones	Amore & Vita	40

=== Mountains classification ===
Rank	Rider	Team	Points
1	(Switzerland) Christian Heule	Team Macandina	20
2	(Zimbabwe) Timothy Jones	Amore & Vita	14
3	(Switzerland) Pascal Hungerbühler	Volksbank	12
4	(Slovenia) Jure Golčer	Volksbank	11
5	(Slovenia) Igor Kranjec	Kamen Pazin	10

=== Young rider classification ===
Rank	Rider	Team	Time
1	(Austria) Andreas Matzbacher	Austria	25h 12' 46"
2	(Netherlands) Stef Clement	Van Hemert Groep Cycling Team	+ 26"
3	(Belgium) Johan Van Summeren	Quick.step Davitamon	+ 1' 03"
4	(Slovenia) Matic Strgar	Radenska Rog	+ 1' 59"
5	(Slovenia) Tomaž Nose	Krka Novo mesto	+ 2' 26"

=== Intermediate sprints classification ===
Rank	Rider	Team	Points
1	(Slovenia) Aldo Ino Ilešič	Perutnina Ptuj U23	15
2	(Slovenia) Leon Makarovič	Radenska Rog	12
3	(Slovenia) Mitja Mahorič	Perutnina Ptuj	10
4	(Austria) Christoph Kerschbaum	Austria	10
5	(Italy) Alberati Paolo	Miche	7

=== Team classification ===
Rank	Team	Time
1	(Switzerland) Team Macandina	
