= 2006 Tour of Slovenia =

UCI Europe Tour (2.1 race)

Race details
- Dates: 8–11 June 2006
- Stages: 4
- Distance: 711 km (442 mi)
- Winning time: 18h 11' 37"

Results
Jersey awarded to the overall winner	Winner	(Slovenia) Jure Golčer (Note: Tomaž Nose's (original winner) results were later (November 2006) deleted due bureaucratic deficiency on application (treated asdoping).)
	Second	(Poland) Przemysław Niemiec
	Third	(Croatia) Robert Kišerlovski
Jersey awarded to the points classification winner	Points	(Slovenia) Borut Božič
Jersey awarded to the mountains classification winner	Mountains	(Slovenia) Matej Gnezda
Jersey awarded to the young rider classification winner	Young rider	(Croatia) Robert Kišerlovski
	Team	(Slovenia) Adria Mobil

The 2006 Tour of Slovenia (Slovene: Dirka po Sloveniji) was the 13th edition of the Tour of Slovenia, categorized as 2.1 stage race (UCI Europe Tour) held between 8 and 11 June 2006.

The race consisted of 4 stages with 711 km (451.1 mi) in total.

The result of Tomaž Nose, the original winner of the race, was later deleted due to not a classical doping but more due to bureaucratic deficiency. He did not report the prescripted medication to UCI in time. He got unnreasonably high and unffair suspension at first for 20 months from November 2006 to July 2008, but he was still competing during this time. But the public was informed about this only in August 2007, ten months later since official suspension. Meanwhile, he won another race edition (2007) and he kept the result of this race, because later the ban was reduced by Court of Arbitration for Sport to 6 months only.

Jure Golčer subsequently became the new official race winner. Borut Božič took points classification (blue jersey), Matej Gnezda won mountains classification (polkadot jersey), Robert Kišerlovski took young rider classification (radler shirt) and Adria Mobil won team classification.

== Teams ==
Total 98 riders (93 finished it) from 13 teams started the race.

=== Pro Tour ===
- (Italy) Lampre–Fondital
- (Italy) Liquigas

=== Pro Continental ===
- (Italy) Acqua & Sapone
- (Republic of Ireland) Tenax–Salmilano
- (Bulgaria) Miche
- (Italy) Androni Giocattoli–3C Casalinghi Jet

=== Continental ===
- (Slovenia) Perutnina Ptuj
- (Slovenia) Sava
- (Slovenia) Adria Mobil
- (Slovenia) Radenska–PowerBar
- (Poland) Amore & Vita–McDonald's
- (Czech Republic) PSK Whirlpool–Hradec Krlove

=== National ===
- Austria

== Route and stages ==
Stage characteristics and winners
Stage	Date	Course	Length	Type	Winner
1	8 June	Lendava – Brežice	214 km (133 mi)	Hilly stage	(Slovenia) Borut Božič
2	9 June	Medvode – Sveta Gora	183 km (114 mi)	Intermediate stage	(Slovenia) Jure Golčer (Slovenia) ~~Tomaž Nose~~
3	10 June	Nova Gorica – Vršič	158 km (98 mi)	Mountain stage	(Slovenia) Jure Golčer; ~~(Slovenia) Tomaž Nose~~
4	11 June	Grosuplje – Novo mesto	156 km (97 mi)	Hilly	(Slovenia) Borut Božič
Skupno		711 km (441.8 mi)			

== Classification leadership ==
Classification leadership by stage
Stage	Winner	General classification	Points classification	Mountains classification	Young rider classification	Team classification
1	Borut Božič	Borut Božič	Borut Božič	Matej Gnezda	Jure Žagar	Lampre–Fondital
2	Jure Golčer; ~~Tomaž Nose~~	Jure Golčer; ~~Tomaž Nose~~	Borut Božič	Matej Gnezda	Miha Švab	Adria Mobil
3	Jure Golčer; ~~Tomaž Nose~~	Jure Golčer; ~~Tomaž Nose~~	Jure Golčer; ~~Tomaž Nose~~	Jure Golčer; ~~Tomaž Nose~~	Robert Kišerlovski	Adria Mobil
4	Borut Božič	Jure Golčer; ~~Tomaž Nose~~	Borut Božič	Matej Gnezda	Robert Kišerlovski	Adria Mobil
Final		~~Tomaž Nose~~ Jure Golčer	Borut Božič	Matej Gnezda	Robert Kišerlovski	Adria Mobil

== Final classification standings ==
Legend
Denotes the leader of the general classification	Denotes the leader of the mountains classification
Denotes the leader of the points classification	Denotes the leader of the young rider classification
Denotes the leader of the team classification	

=== General classification ===
Rank	Rider	Team	Time
~~DSQ~~	(Slovenia) ~~Tomaž Nose~~	Adria Mobil	~~18h 11' 10"~~
1	(Slovenia) Jure Golčer	Perutnina Ptuj	+ 27"
2	(Poland) Przemysław Niemiec	Miche	+ 2' 21"
3	(Croatia) Robert Kišerlovski	Adria Mobil	+ 2' 37"
4	(Croatia) Matija Kvasina	Perutnina Ptuj	+ 3' 26"
5	(Croatia) Radoslav Rogina	Perutnina Ptuj	+ 3' 42"
6	(Slovenia) Miha Švab	Adria Mobil	+ 3' 44"
7	(Slovenia) Tadej Valjavec	Lampre-Fondital	+ 3' 48"
8	(Slovenia) Mitja Mahorič	Perutnina Ptuj	+ 4' 13"
9	(Slovenia) Gorazd Štangelj	Lampre-Fondital	+ 4' 59"
10	(Slovenia) Valter Bonča	Sava	+ 5' 06"

=== Points classification ===
Rank	Rider	Team	Points
1	(Slovenia) Borut Božič	Perutnina Ptuj	55
~~DSQ~~	(Slovenia) ~~Tomaž Nose~~	Adria Mobil	~~50~~
2	(Slovenia) Jure Golčer	Perutnina Ptuj	40
3	(Slovenia) Jure Zrimšek	Aqua & Sapone	36
4	(Estonia) Andrus Aug	Acqua & Sapone	32
5	(Poland) Przemysław Niemiec	Miche	30
6	(Italy) Mattia Gavazzi	Amore & Vita-McDonald's	30
7	(Slovenia) Gorazd Štangelj	Lampre-Fondital	29
8	(Croatia) Robert Kišerlovski	Adria Mobil	26
9	(Slovenia) Zoran Klemenčič	Adria Mobil	25
10	(Slovenia) Matija Kvasina	Perutnina Ptuj	22

=== Mountains classification ===
Rank	Rider	Team	Points
1	(Slovenia) Matej Gnezda	Radenska Powerbar	21
~~DSQ~~	(Slovenia) ~~Tomaž Nose~~	Adria Mobil	~~20~~
2	(Slovenia) Jure Golčer	Perutnina Ptuj	12
3	(Croatia) Hrvoje Miholjević	Perutnina Ptuj	5
4	(Slovenia) Grega Bole	Sava	5
5	(Slovenia) Blaž Mihovec	Radenska Powerbar	5

=== Young rider classification ===
Rank	Rider	Team	Time
1	(Croatia) Robert Kišerlovski	Adria Mobil	18h 13' 47"
2	(Slovenia) Miha Švab	Adria Mobil	+ 1' 07"
3	(Italy) Eros Capecchi	Liquigas	+ 2' 32"
4	(Czech Republic) Roman Kreuziger	Liquigas	+ 3' 27"
5	(Austria) Markus Eibegger	Austria	+ 5' 29"

=== Team classification ===
Rank	Team	Time
1	(Slovenia) Adria Mobil	54h 40′ 15″
2	(Slovenia) Perutnina Ptuj	+ 1′ 03″
3	(Italy) Liquigas	+ 16′ 47″
4	(Slovenia) Sava	+ 17′ 58″
5	(Italy) Lampre-Fondital	+ 19′ 12″
6	(Slovenia) Radenska Powerbar	+ 20′ 27″
7	(Italy) Acqua & Sapone - Caffè Mokambo	+ 24′ 43″
8	(Czech Republic) PSK Whirlpool Hradec Kralove	+ 25′ 50″
9	(Austria) Avstrija	+ 25′ 54″
10	(Republic of Ireland) Tenax Salmilano	+ 26′ 31″
