= 2004 Tour of Slovenia =

UCI‑2.5 race

Race details
- Dates: 4–9 May 2004
- Stages: 7
- Distance: 922 km (572.9 mi)
- Winning time: 21h 48' 03"

Results
Jersey awarded to the overall winner	Winner	(Slovenia) Mitja Mahorič
	Second	(Belarus) Aleksandr Kuschynski
	Third	(Slovenia) Matic Strgar
Jersey awarded to the points classification winner	Points	(Slovenia) Matic Strgar
Jersey awarded to the mountains classification winner	Mountains	(Slovenia) Matic Strgar
Jersey awarded to the youth classification winner	Youth	(Slovenia) Matic Strgar
Jersey awarded to the sprints classification winner	Sprints	(Sweden) Jonas Ljungblad
	Team	(Slovenia) Krka Novo mesto

The 2004 Tour of Slovenia (Slovene: Dirka po Sloveniji) was the 11th edition of the Tour of Slovenia, categorized as UCI‑2.5 stage race held between 4 and 9 May 2004.

The race consisted of 7 stages with 922 km (572.9 mi) in total.

The original race was 995 km (618.3 mi) long, but the 6th stage from Villach (AUT)–Vršič finish ha to be shortened due to bad weather at Vršič Pass for 72 km (45 mi), with new finish at Ljubelj.

The 1st time race crossed the national borders, at 5 stages; Italy (2x), Austria (2x) and Croatia (1x).

== Teams ==
Total 115 riders (79 finished it) from 20 teams started the race.

=== Professional ===
- (Slovenia) Perutnina Ptuj
- (Slovenia) Sava Kranj
- (Austria) Volksbank–Ideal Leingrüber
- (Austria) Team Hervis Apossort
- (Switzerland) Team Macandina-Kewa Rad
- (Poland) Amore & Vita–Beretta
- Team Nippo Japan
- (Germany) Winfix Arnolds Sicherheit
- (Italy) Cyber Team Faresin
- (Switzerland) Saeco-Romer's-Wetzikon
- (Netherlands) Axa Cycling Team
- (Netherlands) Team Moser-AH.nl

=== Amateur ===
- (Slovenia) Radenska Rog
- (Slovenia) TBP Lenart
- (Slovenia) Krka Novo mesto
- (Slovenia) Štajerska
- (Croatia) Kamen Pazin

=== National ===
- Austria
- Slovakia
- Germany

== Route and stages ==
Stage characteristics and winners
Stage	Date	Course	Length	Type	Winner
1	4 May	Izola – Trst/Trieste (Italy)	76 km (47 mi)	Hilly stage	(Belarus) Aleksandr Kuschynski
2	4 May	Trst/Trieste (Italy) – Nova Gorica	72 km (45 mi)	Plain stage	(Slovenia) Borut Božič
3	5 May	Ljubljana – Zagreb (Croatia)	190 km (118 mi)	Plain stage	(Slovenia) Borut Božič
4	6 May	Ormož – Ptuj	160 km (99 mi)	Plain stage	(Sweden) Jonas Ljungblad
5	7 May	Lenart – Beljak/Villach (Austria)	208 km (129 mi)	Plain stage	(Slovenia) Mitja Mahorič
6	8 May	Beljak/Villach (Austria) – Ljubelj; ~~Beljak/Villach (Austria) –Vršič~~	66 km (41 mi); ~~139 km (86 mi)~~	Mountain stage	(Slovenia) Tomaž Nose
7	9 May	Grosuplje – Novo mesto	150 km (93 mi)	Plain stage	(Netherlands) Peter Möhlmann
Total		922 km (572.9 mi); ~~995 km (618.3 mi)~~			

== Classification leadership ==
Classification leadership by stage
Stage	Winner	General classification	Points classification	Mountains classification	Young rider classification	Intermediate sprints classification	Team classification
1	Aleksandr Kuschynski	Aleksandr Kuschynski	Aleksandr Kuschynski	Matic Strgar	Andrej Omulec	Jonas Ljungblad	Amore & Vita Beretta
2	Borut Božič	Aleksandr Kuschynski	Jure Zrimšek	Matic Strgar	Andrej Omulec	Jonas Ljungblad	Amore & Vita Beretta
3	Borut Božič	Andrej Omulec	Jure Zrimšek	Matic Strgar	Andrej Omulec	Borut Božič	Radenska Rog
4	Jonas Ljungblad	Borut Božič	Jure Zrimšek	Matic Strgar	Jure Zrimšek	Borut Božič	Perutnina Ptuj
5	Mitja Mahorič	Aleksandr Kuschynski	Jonas Ljungblad	Matic Strgar	Leon Makarovič	Mitja Mahorič	Perutnina Ptuj
6	Tomaž Nose	Mitja Mahorič	Matic Strgar	Matic Strgar	Matic Strgar	Jonas Ljungblad	Krka Novo mesto
7	Peter Möhlmann	Mitja Mahorič	Matic Strgar	Matic Strgar	Matic Strgar	Jonas Ljungblad	Krka Novo mesto
Final		Mitja Mahorič	Matic Strgar	Matic Strgar	Matic Strgar	Jonas Ljungblad	Krka

== Final classification standings ==
Legend
Denotes the leader of the general classification	Denotes the leader of the mountains classification
Denotes the leader of the points classification	Denotes the leader of the young rider classification
Denotes the winner of the int. sprints classification	Denotes the leader of the team classification

=== General classification ===
Rank	Rider	Team	Time
1	(Slovenia) Mitja Mahorič	Perutnina Ptuj	21h 48' 03"
2	(Belarus) Aleksandr Kuschynski	Amore & Vita Beretta	+ 26"
3	(Slovenia) Matic Strgar	Radenska Rog	+ 41"
4	(Slovenia) Miha Švab	Krka Novo mesto	+ 54"
5	(Slovenia) Jani Brajkovič	Krka Novo mesto	+ 59"
6	(Croatia) Matija Kvasina	Perutnina Ptuj	+ 1' 00"
7	(Slovenia) Leon Makarovič	Radenska Rog	+ 1' 01"
8	(Lithuania) Drąsutis Stundžia	Cyber Team Faresin	+ 1' 08"
9	(Finland) Kjell Carlström	Amore & Vita Beretta	+ 2' 01"
10	(Sweden) Jonas Ljungblad	Amore & Vita Beretta	+ 2' 05"

=== Points classification ===
Rank	Rider	Team	Points
1	(Slovenia) Matic Strgar	Radenska Rog	64
2	(Czech Republic) Petr Herman	Team Hervis Apossort	46
3	(Slovenia) Mitja Mahorič	Perutnina Ptuj	45
4	(Switzerland) Christian Heule	Team Macandina (Kewa Rad)	45
5	(Belarus) Aleksandr Kuschynski	Amore & Vita Beretta	44

=== Mountains classification ===
Rank	Rider	Team	Points
1	(Slovenia) Matic Strgar	Radenska Rog	18
2	(Slovenia) Mitja Mahorič	Perutnina Ptuj	16
3	(Slovenia) Tomaž Nose	Krka Novo mesto	11
4	(Slovenia) Jani Brajkovič	Krka Novo mesto	9
5	(Switzerland) Sascha Urweider	Saeco-Romer's-Wetzikon	9

=== Young rider classification ===
Rank	Rider	Team	Time
1	(Slovenia) Matic Strgar	Radenska Rog	21h 48' 44"
2	(Slovenia) Miha Švab	Krka Novo mesto	+ 13"
3	(Slovenia) Jani Brajkovič	Krka Novo mesto	+ 18"
4	(Slovenia) Leon Makarovič	Radenska Rog	+ 20"
5	(Austria) Markus Eibegger	Avstrija	+ 1′ 14"

=== Intermediate sprints classification ===
Rank	Rider	Team	Points
1	(Sweden) Jonas Ljungblad	Amore & Vita Beretta	12
2	(Slovenia) Mitja Mahorič	Perutnina Ptuj	8
3	(Switzerland) Sascha Urweider	Saeco-Romer's-Wetzikon	7
4	(Slovenia) Andrej Omulec	Radenska Rog	6
5	(Slovenia) Valter Bonča	Perutnina Ptuj	4

=== Team classification ===
Rank	Team	Time
1	(Slovenia) Krka Novo mesto	65h 25' 36"
2	(Slovenia) Perutnina Ptuj	+ 1′ 21″
3	(Poland) Amore & Vita Beretta	+ 3′ 17″
4	(Switzerland) Team Macandina-Kewa Rad	+ 6′ 14″
5	(Slovakia) Slovaška	+ 9′ 07″
...	...	...
6	(Slovenia) Radenska Rog	+ 14′ 02″
7	(Slovenia) Sava Kranj	+ 30′ 14″
14	(Slovenia) TBP Lenart	+ 1h 40′ 26″
