= 2002 Tour of Slovenia =

UCI‑2.5 race

Race details
- Dates: 7–12 May 2002
- Stages: 7
- Distance: 1,029 km (639 mi)
- Winning time: 24h 21' 21"

Results
Jersey awarded to the overall winner	Winner	(Russia) Evgeni Petrov
	Second	(Slovenia) Dean Podgornik
	Third	(Austria) Hannes Hempel
Jersey awarded to the points classification winner	Points	(Russia) Evgeni Petrov
Jersey awarded to the mountains classification winner	Mountains	(Slovenia) Dean Podgornik
Jersey awarded to the young rider classification winner	Young rider	(Germany) Patrik Sinkewitz
Jersey awarded to the sprints classification winner	Sprints	(Austria) Hannes Hempel
	Team	(Italy) Mapei–Quick-Step

The 2002 Tour of Slovenia (Slovene: Dirka po Sloveniji) was the 9th edition of the Tour of Slovenia, categorized as UCI‑2.5 stage race held between 7 and 12 May 2002.

The race consisted of 7 stages with 1,029 km (639.4 mi) in total.

== Teams ==
Total 98 riders (73 finished it) from 14 teams started the race.

=== Professional ===
- (Slovenia) Perutnina Ptuj–KRKA–Telekom Slovenije (TT2)
- (Italy) Mapei–Quick-Step (TT3)
- (Australia) iTeamNova.com (TT3)
- (United States) Saturn Cycling Team (TT3)
- (Austria) Team Gericom Bikedrive (TT3)
- (Austria) Volksbank–Ideal (TT3)
- (Netherlands) Van Hemert Groep Cycling Team (TT3)
- (Germany) LTA - Quattro Logistics (TT3)
- (Czech Republic) AC Sparta Praha (TT3)
  (TT = trade team)

=== Amateur ===
- (Slovenia) Radenska Rog
- (Slovenia) HiT Casino
- (Slovenia) Sava Kranj
- (Slovenia) Krka Telekom
- (Slovenia) Perutnina Ptuj (young team)

== Route and stages ==
Stage characteristics and winners
Stage	Date	Course	Length	Type	Winner
1	7 May	Čatež – Beltinci	190 km (118 mi)	Plain stage	(Switzerland) Aurélien Clerc
2	8 May	Radenci – Ptuj	120 km (75 mi)	Plain stage	(Slovenia) Marko Žepič
3	8 May	Ptuj – Gomilci – Ptuj	13 km (8 mi)	Time trial	(Slovenia) Dean Podgornik
4	9 May	Slovenska Bistrica – Ljubljana	161 km (100 mi)	Intermediate stage	(Italy) Filippo Pozzato
5	10 May	Ivančna Gorica – Ajdovščina	175 km (109 mi)	Mountain stage	(Russia) Evgeni Petrov
6	11 May	Nova Gorica – Vršič – Kranj	182 km (113 mi)	Mountain stage	(Slovenia) Boštjan Mervar
7	12 May	Ribnica – Novo mesto	178 km (111 mi)	Plain stage	(Italy) Filippo Pozzato
Total		1,029 km (639.4 mi)			

== Classification leadership ==
Classification leadership by stage
Stage	Winner	General classification	Points classification	Mountains classification	Young rider classification	Intermediate sprints classification	Team classification
1	Aurélien Clerc	Aurélien Clerc	Boštjan Mervar	Tim Johnson	Jure Zrimšek	not available	Mapei–Quick-Step
2	Marko Žepič	Marko Žepič	Marko Žepič	Aurélien Clerc	Jure Zrimšek	Tim Johnson	not available
3	Dean Podgornik	Dean Podgornik	not available	not available	not available	not available	Mapei–Quick-Step
4	Filippo Pozzato	Dean Podgornik	not available	not available	not available	not available	Mapei–Quick-Step
5	Evgeni Petrov	Evgeni Petrov	Evgeni Petrov	Dean Podgornik	Patrik Sinkewitz	Hannes Hempl	Mapei–Quick-Step
6	Boštjan Mervar	Evgeni Petrov	not available	not available	not available	not available	Mapei–Quick-Step
7	Filippo Pozzato	Evgeni Petrov	Evgeni Petrov	Dean Podgornik	Patrik Sinkewitz	Hannes Hempel	Mapei–Quick-Step
Final		Evgeni Petrov	Evgeni Petrov	Dean Podgornik	Patrik Sinkewitz	Hannes Hempel	Mapei–Quick-Step

== Final classification standings ==
Legend
Denotes the leader of the general classification	Denotes the leader of the mountains classification
Denotes the leader of the points classification	Denotes the leader of the young rider classification
Denotes the winner of the int. sprints classification	Denotes the leader of the team classification

=== General classification ===
Rank	Rider	Team	Time
1	(Russia) Evgeni Petrov	Mapei-Quick Step Espoirs	24h 21' 21"
2	(Slovenia) Dean Podgornik	HiT Casino	+ 34"
3	(Austria) Hannes Hempel	Team Gericom Bikedrive	+ 1' 01"
4	(Croatia) Massimo Demarin	HiT Casino	+ 1' 02"
5	(Slovenia) Jure Golčer	Perutnina Ptuj-Krka Telekom	+ 1' 12"
6	(Germany) Patrik Sinkewitz	Mapei-Quick Step Espoirs	+ 1' 22"
7	(Slovenia) Valter Bonča	Perutnina Ptuj-Krka Telekom	+ 1' 37"
8	(Slovenia) Tomaž Nose	Krka Telekom	+ 1' 48"
9	(Australia) Alan Iacuone	iTeamNova.com	+ 2' 08"
10	(New Zealand) Fraser McMaster	Volksbank-Ideal	+ 2' 13"

=== Points classification ===
Rank	Rider	Team	Points
1	(Russia) Evgeni Petrov	Mapei-Quick Step Espoirs	

=== Mountains classification ===
Rank	Rider	Team	Points
1	(Slovenia) Dean Podgornik	Hit Casino	

=== Young rider classification ===
Rank	Rider	Team	Time
1	(Germany) Patrik Sinkewitz	Mapei-Quick Step Espoirs	24h 22' 43"
2	(Slovenia) Tomaž Nose	Krka Telekom	+ 26"
3	(Slovenia) Gregor Gazvoda	Perutnina Ptuj	+ 2' 55"

=== Intermediate sprints classification ===
Rank	Rider	Team	Points
1	(Austria) Hannes Hempel	Team Gericom Bikedrive	

=== Team classification ===
Rank	Team	Time
1	(Italy) Mapei–Quick-Step	
