= 1999 Tour of Slovenia =

UCI‑5 race

Race details
- Dates: 3–9 May 1999
- Stages: 6 + prologue
- Distance: 1,102.5 km (685.1 mi)
- Winning time: 26h 39' 44"

Results
Jersey awarded to the overall winner	Winner	(Zimbabwe) Timothy Jones
	Second	(Slovenia) Tadej Valjavec
	Third	(Italy) Stefano Panetta
Jersey awarded to the points classification winner	Points	(Italy) Gabriele Balducci
Jersey awarded to the mountains classification winner	Mountains	(Slovenia) Martin Derganc
Jersey awarded to the youth classification winner	Youth	(Slovenia) Tadej Valjavec
Jersey awarded to the sprints classification winner	Sprints	(Slovenia) Martin Derganc
	Team	(Slovenia) KRKA–Telekom Slovenije

The 1999 Tour of Slovenia (Slovene: Dirka po Sloveniji) was the 6th edition of the Tour of Slovenia, categorized as UCI‑5 stage race held between 3 and 9 May 1999.

The race consisted of opening prologue and actual 6 stages with 1,102 km (685.1 mi) in total.

== Teams ==
Total 98 riders (63 finished it) from 10 different countries and 18 teams started the race.

=== Professional ===
- (Slovenia) KRKA–Telekom Slovenije
- (United Kingdom) Amore & Vita–Giubileo 2000–Beretta
- (Italy) Cantina Tollo
- (Italy) Navigare–Gaerne
- (United Kingdom) Linda McCartney On Tour
- (Poland) Mróz
- (Germany) Peugeot Team Berlin
- (Czech Republic) Joko Velamos

=== Amateur ===
- (Slovenia) Perutnina Ptuj - Radenska Rog (2 clubs united)
- (Slovenia) Savaprojekt Krško
- (Slovenia) Perutnina Ptuj
- (Slovenia) Sava Kranj
- (Netherlands) Van Vliet-Weba-Gazelle
- Elk-Austria
- (Croatia) Kamen Pazin

=== National ===
- Ukraine
- (Slovakia) Slovak
- Slovenia (young team)

== Route and stages ==
Stage characteristics and winners
Stage	Date	Course	Length	Type	Winner
0	3 May	Nova Gorica	2.5 km (2 mi)	Prologue	(Slovenia) Boštjan Mervar
1	4 May	Nova Gorica – Nova Gorica	185 km (115 mi)	Hilly stage	(Italy) Gabriele Balducci
2	5 May	Ribnica – Rogaška Slatina	176 km (109 mi)	Plain stage	(Austria) Josef Lontscharitsch
3	6 May	Radenci – Beltinci	161 km (100 mi)	Plain stage	(Italy) Enrico Degano
4	7 May	Maribor – Ljubljana	191 km (119 mi)	Intermediate stage	(Italy) Dario Pieri
5	8 May	Grosuplje – Vršič	202 km (126 mi)	Mountain stage	(Zimbabwe) Timothy Jones
6	9 May	Semič – Novo mesto	185 km (115 mi)	Plain stage	(Italy) Moreno Di Biase
Total		1,102.5 km (685.1 mi)			

== Classification leadership ==
Classification leadership by stage
Stage	Winner	General classification	Points classification	Mountains classification	Young rider classification	Intermediate sprints classification	Team classification
0	Boštjan Mervar	Boštjan Mervar	not available	not available	not available	not available	Krka Telekom
1	Gabriele Balducci	Boštjan Mervar	not available	Marko Derganc	Matej Gnezda	Marko Derganc	Krka Telekom
2	Josef Lontscharitsch	Boštjan Mervar	Josef Lontscharitsch	Gerrit Glomser	Matej Gnezda	Marko Derganc	not available
3	Enrico Degano	Boštjan Mervar	Gabriele Balducci	Gerrit Glomser	Matej Gnezda	Marko Derganc	Krka Telekom
4	Dario Pieri	Boštjan Mervar	Boštjan Mervar	Marko Derganc	Matej Gnezda	Marko Derganc	Krka Telekom
5	Timothy Jones	Timothy Jones	Boštjan Mervar	Marko Derganc	not available	Marko Derganc	not available
6	Moreno di Biase	Timothy Jones	Gabriele Balducci	Marko Derganc	Tadej Valjavec	Marko Derganc	Krka Telekom
Final		Timothy Jones	Gabriele Balducci	Martin Derganc	Tadej Valjavec	Martin Derganc	Krka Telekom

== Final classification standings ==
Legend
Denotes the leader of the general classification	Denotes the leader of the mountains classification
Denotes the leader of the points classification	Denotes the winner of the young rider classification
Denotes the leader of the int. sprints classification	Denotes the leader of the team classification

=== General classification ===
Rank	Rider	Team	Time
1	(Zimbabwe) Timothy Jones	Amore&Vita	26h 39' 44"
2	(Slovenia) Tadej Valjavec	Sava Kranj	+ 1' 49"
3	(Italy) Stefano Panetta	Navigare - Gaerne	+ 2' 04"
4	(Austria) Gerrit Glomser	Navigare - Gaerne	+ 2' 06"
5	(Italy) Massimo Giunti	Cantina Tollo	+ 2' 23"
6	(Slovenia) Boštjan Mervar	Krka Telekom	+ 2' 33"
7	(Slovenia) Uroš Murn	Krka Telekom	+ 2' 45"
8	(Italy) Federico Giabbecueci	Cantina Tollo	+ 2' 53"
9	(Slovenia) Sandi Šmerc	Savaprojekt Krško	+ 2' 57"
10	(Slovenia) Boris Premužič	Perutnina Ptuj-Radenska Rog	+ 3' 16"

=== Points classification ===
Rank	Rider	Team	Points
1	(Italy) Gabriele Balducci	Navigare - Gaerne	74
2	(Italy) Moreno di Biase	Cantina Tollo	72
3	(Slovenia) Boštjan Mervar	Krka Telekom	71
4	(Austria) Josef Lontscharitsch	Elk-Austria	66
5	(Slovenia) Uroš Murn	Krka Telekom	40

=== Mountains classification ===
Rank	Rider	Team	Points
1	(Slovenia) Martin Derganc	Slovenija mladi	20
2	(Slovenia) Klemen Tušek	Slovenija mladi	11
3	(Zimbabwe) Timothy Jones	Amore & Vita	10
4	(Italy) Stefano Panetta	Navigare-Gaerne	7
5	(Austria) Gerrid Glomser	Navigare-Gaerne	7

=== Young rider classification ===
Rank	Rider	Team	Time
1	(Slovenia) Tadej Valjavec	Sava Kranj	26h 41' 33"
2	(Slovenia) Matej Stare	Sava Kranj	+ 5' 35"
3	(Slovenia) Martin Derganc	Slovenija mladi	+ 7' 32"

=== Intermediate sprints classification ===
Rank	Rider	Team	Points
1	(Slovenia) Martin Derganc	Slovenija mladi	38
2	(Slovenia) Klemen Tušek	Slovenija mladi	20
3	(Italy) Maurizio De Pasquale	Amore&Vita	15
4	(Italy) Andrea Patuelli	Navigare-Gaerne	13
5	(Austria) Gerrid Glomser	Navigare-Gaerne	8

=== Team classification ===
Rank	Team	Time
1	(Slovenia) Krka Telekom	
2	(Italy) Cantina Tollo	+ 1′ 52″
3	(Slovenia) Perutnina Ptuj - Radenska Rog	+ 1′ 58″
4	(Slovenia) Sava	+ 9′ 05″
5		
...	...	...
8	(Slovenia) Savaprojekt Krško	+ 22′ 33″
9	(Slovenia) Slovenija mladi	+ 23′ 51″
11	(Slovenia) Perutnina Ptuj	+ 38′ 52″
