= 2009 Tour of Slovenia =

UCI Europe Tour (2.1 race)

Race details
- Dates: 18–21 June 2009
- Stages: 4
- Distance: 699.7 km (434.8 mi)
- Winning time: 18h 01' 56"

Results
| Jersey awarded to the overall winner | Winner | (Denmark) Jakob Fuglsang |
| | Second | (Slovenia) Tomaž Nose |
| | Third | (Italy) Domenico Pozzovivo |
| Jersey awarded to the points classification winner | Points | (Denmark) Jakob Fuglsang |
| Jersey awarded to the mountains classification winner | Mountains | (Denmark) Jakob Fuglsang |
| Jersey awarded to the young rider classification winner | Young rider | (Slovenia) Blaž Furdi |
| | Team | (Denmark) Team Saxo Bank |

The 2009 Tour of Slovenia (Slovene: Dirka po Sloveniji) was the 16th edition of the Tour of Slovenia, categorized as a 2.1 stage race (UCI Europe Tour) held between 18 and 21 June 2009.

The race consisted of 4 stages with 699.7 km (434.8 mi) in total.

== Teams ==
Total 122 riders (96 finished it) from 16 teams started the race.

=== Pro Tour ===
- (Denmark) Team Saxo Bank
- (Italy) Lampre–NGC
- (Italy) ISD–Neri
- (Italy) Liquigas

=== Pro Continental ===
- (Italy) Carmiooro A Style
- (Italy) CSF Group–Navigare
- (Italy) Centri della Calzatura
- (Italy) Acqua & Sapone–Caffè Mokambo
- (Austria) ELK Haus-Simplon
- (Czech Republic) PSK Whirlpool–Author

=== Continental ===
- (Slovenia) Motomat Delo Revije
- (Slovenia) Sava
- (Slovenia) Adria Mobil
- (Slovenia) Radenska–KD Financial Point

=== National ===
- Croatia
- Slovenia

== Route and stages ==
Stage characteristics and winners
| Stage | Date | Course | Length | Type | Winner |
|---|---|---|---|---|---|
| 1 | 18 June | Koper – Villach (Austria) | 229 km (142 mi) | | (Denmark) Jakob Fuglsang |
| 2 | 19 June | Kamnik – Ljubljana | 143 km (89 mi) | | (Italy) Giovanni Visconti |
| 3 | 20 June | Lenart – Krvavec | 174.7 km (109 mi) | Mountain stage | (Slovenia) Simon Špilak |
| 4 | 21 June | Šentjernej – Novo mesto | 153 km (95 mi) | | (Slovenia) Marko Kump |
| Total | | 699.7 km (434.8 mi) | | | |

== Classification leadership ==
Classification leadership by stage
| Stage | Winner | General classification | Points classification | Mountains classification | Young rider classification | Team classification |
|---|---|---|---|---|---|---|
| 1 | Jakob Fuglsang | Jakob Fuglsang | Jakob Fuglsang | Jakob Fuglsang | Blaž Furdi | Team Saxo Bank |
| 2 | Giovanni Visconti | Jakob Fuglsang | Giovanni Visconti | Jakob Fuglsang | Blaž Furdi | Team Saxo Bank |
| 3 | Simon Špilak | Jakob Fuglsang | Jakob Fuglsang | Jakob Fuglsang | Blaž Furdi | Team Saxo Bank |
| 4 | Giovanni Visconti | Jakob Fuglsang | Jakob Fuglsang | Jakob Fuglsang | Blaž Furdi | Team Saxo Bank |
| Final | | Jakob Fuglsang | Jakob Fuglsang | Jakob Fuglsang | Blaž Furdi | Team Saxo Bank |

== Final classification standings ==
Legend
| Denotes the leader of the general classification | Denotes the leader of the mountains classification |
| Denotes the leader of the points classification | Denotes the leader of the young rider classification |
| Denotes the leader of the team classification | |

=== General classification ===
| Rank | Rider | Team | Time |
|---|---|---|---|
| 1 | (Denmark) Jakob Fuglsang | Team Saxo Bank | 18h 01' 56" |
| 2 | (Slovenia) Tomaž Nose | Adria Mobil | + 02' 48" |
| 3 | (Italy) Domenico Pozzovivo | CSF Group–Navigare | + 03' 14" |
| 4 | (Italy) Dario Cioni | ISD–Neri | + 03' 29" |
| 5 | (Slovenia) Gašper Švab | Sava | + 03' 54" |
| 6 | (Croatia) Matija Kvasina | Croatia | + 04' 36" |
| 7 | (Germany) Jens Voigt | Team Saxo Bank | + 05' 08" |
| 8 | (Slovenia) Mitja Mahorič | Radenska–KD Financial Point | + 05' 14" |
| 9 | (Russia) Alexandr Kolobnev | Team Saxo Bank | + 06' 01" |
| 10 | (Slovenia) Gorazd Štangelj | Liquigas | + 06' 10" |

=== Team classification ===
| Rank | Team | Time |
|---|---|---|
| 1 | (Denmark) Team Saxo Bank | 54h 16' 49" |
| 2 | (Italy) ISD–Neri | + 05' 01" |
| 3 | (Italy) Lampre–NGC | + 10' 01" |
| 4 | (Slovenia) Sava | + 14' 06" |
| 5 | (Italy) Liquigas | + 17' 30" |
| 6 | (Italy) CSF Group–Navigare | + 17' 34" |
| 7 | (Italy) Acqua & Sapone–Caffè Mokambo | + 22' 06" |
| 8 | Croatia | + 27' 05" |
| 9 | Slovenia | + 28' 12" |
| 10 | (Slovenia) Radenska–KD Financial Point | + 35' 20" |
