= 1998 Tour of Slovenia =

UCI‑5 race

Race details
- Dates: 4–10 May 1998
- Stages: 7 + prologue
- Distance: 1,085 km (674.2 mi)
- Winning time: 26h 28' 01"

Results
Jersey awarded to the overall winner	Winner	(Slovenia) Branko Filip
	Second	(Slovenia) Gorazd Štangelj
	Third	(Bulgaria) Pavel Shumanov
Jersey awarded to the points classification winner	Points	(Slovenia) Andrej Hauptman
Jersey awarded to the mountains classification winner	Mountains	(Slovenia) Igor Kranjec
Jersey awarded to the youth classification winner	Youth	(Slovenia) Mitja Mahorič
Jersey awarded to the sprints classification winner	Sprints	(Slovenia) Igor Kranjec
	Team	(Slovenia) KRKA–Telekom Slovenije

The 1998 Tour of Slovenia (Slovene: Dirka po Sloveniji) was the 5th edition of the Tour of Slovenia, categorized as UCI‑5 stage race held between 4 and 10 May 1998.

The race consisted of prologue and actual 7 stages with 1,085 km (674.2 mi) in total.

== Teams ==
Total 98 riders (62 finished it) from 13 different countries and 16 teams started the race.

=== Professional ===
- (Slovenia) KRKA–Telekom Slovenije
- (Italy) Amore & Vita–ForzArcore
- (Italy) Kross–Selle Italia
- (United Kingdom) Linda McCartney On Tour
- (Poland) Mróz
- (Czech Republic) ZVVZ–DLD
- (Germany) Agro–Adler Brandenburg

=== Amateur ===
- (Slovenia) Perutnina Ptuj - Radenska Rog (2 clubs united)
- (Slovenia) Savaprojekt
- (Slovenia) Hit Casino
- (Slovenia) Sava

=== National ===
- (Slovakia) Slovak
- Croatia
- Bulgaria
- United Kingdom
- Ukraine

== Route and stages ==
Stage characteristics and winners
Stage	Date	Course	Length	Type	Winner
0	4 May	Ptuj	3.4 km (2 mi)	Prologue	(Germany) Olaf Pollack
1	5 May	Radenci – Beltinci	198 km (123 mi)	Plain stage	(Germany) Olaf Pollack
2	6 May	Maribor – Kranj	168 km (104 mi)	Intermediate stage	(Slovenia) Andrej Hauptman
3	7 May	Krško – Brežice – Krško	18 km (11 mi)	Time trial	(Slovenia) Valter Bonča
4	7 May	Semič – Metlika – Semič	85 km (53 mi)	Plain stage	(Italy) Maurizio De Pasquale
5	8 May	Ribnica – Nova Gorica	230 km (143 mi)	Intermediate stage	(Italy) Simone Zucchi
6	9 May	Nova Gorica – Vršič – Ljubljana	206 km (128 mi)	Mountain stage	(Italy) Simone Mori
7	10 May	Grosuplje – Novo mesto	177 km (110 mi)	Hilly stage	(Slovenia) Andrej Hauptman
Total		1,085 km (674.2 mi)			

== Classification leadership ==
Classification leadership by stage
Stage	Winner	General classification	Points classification	Mountains classification	Young rider classification	Intermediate sprints classification	Team classification
0	Olaf Pollack	Olaf Pollack	not available	not available	Tadej Valjavec	not available	not available
1	Olaf Pollack	Olaf Pollack	not available	Uroš Murn	Tadej Valjavec	Rik Reinerink	not available
2	Andrej Hauptman	Gorazd Štangelj	not available	Uroš Murn	Mitja Mahorič	Marko Baloh	Mroz
3	Valter Bonča	Branko Filip	not available	not available	not available	not available	not available
4	Maurizio De Pasquale	Branko Filip	not available	not available	not available	not available	not available
5	Simone Zucchi	Branko Filip	Andrej Hauptman	Igor Kranjec	not available	Martin Čotak	not available
6	Simone Mori	Branko Filip	Andrej Hauptman	not available	not available	not available	not available
7	Andrej Hauptman	Branko Filip	Andrej Hauptman	Igor Kranjec	Mitja Mahorič	Igor Kranjec	Krka Telekom
Final		Branko Filip	Andrej Hauptman	Igor Kranjec	Mitja Mahorič	Igor Kranjec	Krka Telekom

== Final classification standings ==
Legend
Denotes the leader of the general classification	Denotes the leader of the mountains classification
Denotes the leader of the points classification	Denotes the winner of the young rider classification
Denotes the leader of the int. sprints classification	Denotes the leader of the team classification

=== General classification ===
Rank	Rider	Team	Time
1	(Slovenia) Branko Filip	Krka Telekom	26h 38' 01"
2	(Slovenia) Gorazd Štangelj	Krka Telekom	+ 4"
3	(Bulgaria) Pavel Shumanov	Krka Telekom	+ 9"
4	(Slovenia) Valter Bonča	PP&RR	+ 21"
5	(Poland) Cezary Zamana	Mroz	+ 33"
6	(Poland) Andrzej Sypytkowski	Mroz	+ 33"
7	(Czech Republic) Tomáš Konečný	ZVVS	+ 38"
8	(Slovenia) Saša Sviben	Krka Telekom	+ 50"
9	(Czech Republic) Miloslav Kejval	ZVVS	+ 51"
10	(Slovenia) Rajko Petek	Sava	+ 1' 13"

=== Points classification ===
Rank	Rider	Team	Points
1	(Slovenia) Andrej Hauptman	PP&RR	97
2	(Italy) Simone Zucchi	Amore & Vita	75
3	(Czech Republic) Tomáš Konečný	ZVVS	74
4	(Slovenia) Gorazd Štangelj	Krka Telekom	71
5	(Slovenia) Boštjan Mervar	Krka Telekom	65

=== Mountains classification ===
Rank	Rider	Team	Points
1	(Slovenia) Igor Kranjec	PP&RR	18
2	(Croatia) Martin Čotar	Sava	14
3	(Italy) Maurizio De Pasquale	Amore & Vita	13

=== Young rider classification ===
Rank	Rider	Team	Time
1	(Slovenia) Mitja Mahorič	PP&RR	26h 39' 43"
2	(Czech Republic) Richard Faltus	aZVVS	
3	(Slovenia) Tadej Valjavec	Sava	

=== Intermediate sprints classification ===
Rank	Rider	Team	Points
1	(Slovenia) Igor Kranjec	PP&RR	24
2	(Croatia) Martin Čotak	Sava	16
3	(United Kingdom) Julian Clark	Linda McCartney	11

=== Team classification ===
Rank	Team	Time
1	(Slovenia) Krka Telekom	79h 55′ 02″
2	(Poland) Mroz	+ 55″
3	(Slovenia) Perutnina Ptuj - Radenska Rog	+ 1′ 20″
4	(Czech Republic) ZVVS	+ 2′ 21″
5	(Italy) Amore & Vita	+ 5′ 22″
...	...	...
6	(Slovenia) Sava	+ 1h 07′ 10″
10	(Slovenia) Hit Casino	+ 1h 25′ 54″
