= 2000 Tour of Slovenia =

UCI‑2.5 race
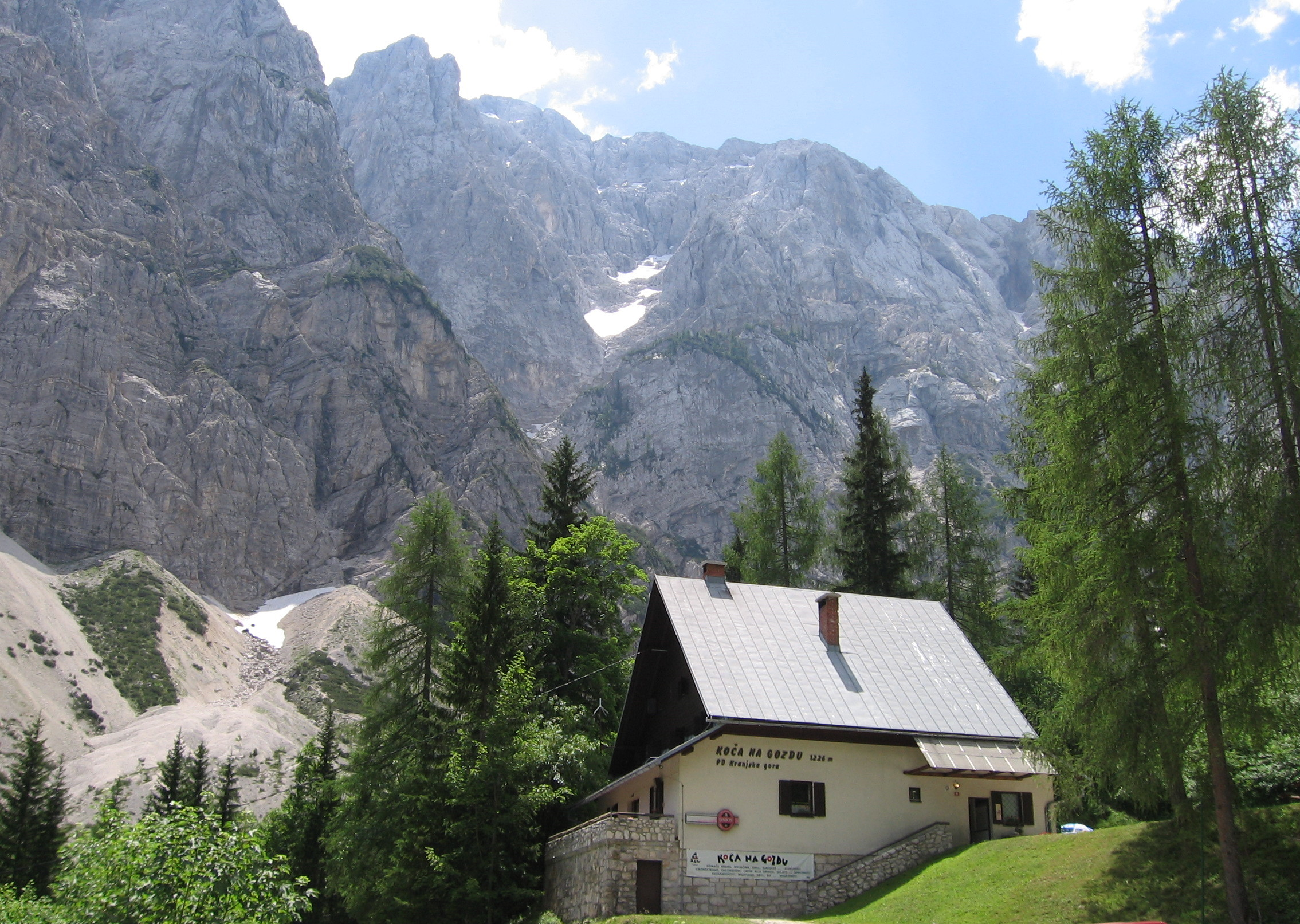
- Koča na Gozdu (1,226 m a.s.l.); 4th stage finish – shortened below Vršič

Race details
- Dates: 16–21 May 2000
- Stages: 5 + prologue
- Distance: 864.2 km (537.0 mi)
- Winning time: 20h 43' 10"

Results
| Jersey awarded to the overall winner | Winner | (Slovenia) Martin Derganc |
| | Second | (Croatia) Vladimir Miholjević |
| | Third | (Slovenia) Boris Premužič |
| Jersey awarded to the points classification winner | Points | (Slovenia) Mitja Mahorič |
| Jersey awarded to the mountains classification winner | Mountains | (Slovenia) Mitja Mahorič |
| Jersey awarded to the youth classification winner | Youth | (Slovenia) Matej Gnezda |
| Jersey awarded to the sprints classification winner | Sprints | (Slovenia) Uroš Murn |
| | Team | (Slovenia) KRKA–Telekom Slovenije |

The 2000 Tour of Slovenia (Slovene: Dirka po Sloveniji) was the 7th edition of the Tour of Slovenia, categorized as UCI‑2.5 stage race held between 16 and 21 May 2000.

The race consisted of prologue and actual 5 stages with 864.2 km (537.0 mi) in total.

The original race was 918.2 km (570.5 mi) long, but the 4th stage from Ribnica–Mangartsko sedlo, was shortened due to snowfall at Vršič Pass for 54 km (33.6 mi), with new lowered finish at Koča na Gozdu.

== Teams ==
Total 92 riders (62 finished it) from 18 teams started the race.

=== Professional ===
- (Slovenia) KRKA–Telekom Slovenije
- (United Kingdom) Amore & Vita–Giubileo 2000–Beretta
- (Italy) Cantina Tollo
- (Italy) Mapei–Quick-Step
- (Italy) Alexio
- (Czech Republic) PKS Unit Expert
- (Czech Republic) Joko Velamos
- (Poland) Atlas Lukullus
- (Switzerland) Kia Villinger
- (Germany) Team Coast

=== Amateur ===
- (Slovenia) Perutnina Ptuj - Radenska Rog (2 clubs united)
- (Slovenia) Ekipa Dolenjska (Krka Telekom II)
- (Slovenia) Perutnina Ptuj
- (Slovenia) Savaprojekt Krško
- (Slovenia) Sava Kranj
- (Netherlands) Rietveld Wielerteam 2000

=== National ===
- Canada
- (Slovakia) Slovak

== Route and stages ==
Stage characteristics and winners
| Stage | Date | Course | Length | Type | Winner |
|---|---|---|---|---|---|
| 0 | 16 May | Novo mesto | 2.2 km (1 mi) | Prologue | (Hungary) László Bodrogi |
| 1 | 17 May | Čatež – Radenci | 198 km (123 mi) | Plain stage | (Switzerland) Christian Weber |
| 2 | 18 May | Radenci – Beltinci | 166 km (103 mi) | Plain stage | (Italy) Dario David Cioni |
| 3 | 19 May | Slovenska Bistrica – Ljubljana | 161 km (100 mi) | Intermediate stage | (Slovenia) Uroš Murn |
| 4 | 20 May | Ribnica – Koča na Gozdu (~~Ribnica~~ – ~~Vršič~~ – ~~Mangartsko sedlo)~~ | 150 km (93 mi); ~~204 km (127 mi)~~ | Mountain stage | (Slovenia) Mitja Mahorič |
| 5 | 21 May | Nova Gorica – Novo mesto | 187 km (116 mi) | Plain stage | (Poland) Seweryn Kohut |
| Total | | 864.2 km (537.0 mi); ~~918.2 km (570.5 mi)~~ | | | |

== Classification leadership ==
Classification leadership by stage
| Stage | Winner | General classification | Points classification | Mountains classification | Young rider classification | Intermediate sprints classification | Team classification |
|---|---|---|---|---|---|---|---|
| 0 | László Bodrogi | László Bodrogi | not available | not awarded | not available | not available | Krka Telekom |
| 1 | Christian Weber | Christian Weber | Christian Weber | Radek Blahut | Marko Žepič | Camiel Soesbergen | Krka Telekom |
| 2 | Dario David Cioni | Christian Weber | not available | not available | not available | Dario David Cioni | not available |
| 3 | Uroš Murn | Boris Premužič | not available | not available | not available | not available | not available |
| 4 | Mitja Mahorič | Mitja Mahorič | Mitja Mahorič | Mitja Mahorič | Matej Gnezda | Uroš Murn | Krka Telekom |
| 5 | Seweryn Kohut | Martin Derganc | Mitja Mahorič | Mitja Mahorič | Matej Gnezda | Uroš Murn | Krka Telekom |
| Final | | Martin Derganc | Mitja Mahorič | Mitja Mahorič | Matej Gnezda | Uroš Murn | Krka telekom |

== Final classification standings ==
Legend
| Denotes the leader of the general classification | Denotes the leader of the mountains classification |
| Denotes the leader of the points classification | Denotes the leader of the young rider classification |
| Denotes the winner of the int. sprints classification | Denotes the leader of the team classification |

=== General classification ===
| Rank | Rider | Team | Time |
|---|---|---|---|
| 1 | (Slovenia) Martin Derganc | Krka Telekom | 20h 43' 10" |
| 2 | (Croatia) Vladimir Miholjević | Krka Telekom | + 16" |
| 3 | (Slovenia) Boris Premužič | Krka Telekom | + 1' 06" |
| 4 | (Canada) Sylvain Beauchamp | Kanada | + 1' 34" |
| 5 | (Slovenia) Mitja Mahorič | Perutnina Ptuj | + 1' 42" |
| 6 | (Canada) Brian Walton | Kanada | + 1' 55" |
| 7 | (Switzerland) Christian Weber | Kia-Villiger | + 2' 04" |
| 8 | (Italy) Eddy Ratti | Mapei-Quick Step | + 2' 50" |
| 9 | (Switzerland) Alexandre Moos | Kia-Villiger | + 3' 21" |
| 10 | (Poland) Seweryn Kohut | Amore & Vita | + 4' 16" |

=== Points classification ===
| Rank | Rider | Team | Points |
|---|---|---|---|
| 1 | (Slovenia) Mitja Mahorič | Perutnina Ptuj | 54 |
| 2 | (Slovenia) Martin Derganc | Krka Telekom | 42 |
| 3 | (Italy) Dario David Cioni | Mapei-Quick Step | 41 |
| 4 | (Croatia) Vladimir Miholjević | Krka Telekom | 40 |
| 5 | (Poland) Seweryn Kohut | Amore & Vita | 37 |

=== Mountains classification ===
| Rank | Rider | Team | Points |
|---|---|---|---|
| 1 | (Slovenia) Mitja Mahorič | Perutnina Ptuj | 25 |
| 2 | (Slovenia) Uroš Murn | Krka Telekom | 15 |
| 3 | (Switzerland) Alexandre Moos | Kia-Villiger | 12 |
| 4 | (Slovenia) Igor Kranjec | PP & RR | 7 |
| 5 | (Poland) Seweryn Kohut | Amore & Vita | 6 |

=== Young rider classification ===
| Rank | Rider | Team | Time |
|---|---|---|---|
| 1 | (Slovenia) Matej Gnezda | PP & RR | 20h 54' 07" |
| 2 | (Slovenia) Matej Stare | Sava Kranj | + 1' 05" |
| 3 | (Slovenia) Matija Kotnik | PP & RR | + 4' 54" |
| 4 | (Netherlands) Jorne J. Videler | Rietveld Wielerteam 2000 | + 11' 00" |
| 5 | (South Africa) Ryan Cox | Amore & Vita | + 11' 48" |

=== Intermediate sprints classification ===
| Rank | Rider | Team | Points |
|---|---|---|---|
| 1 | (Slovenia) Uroš Murn | Krka Telekom | 18 |
| 2 | (Slovenia) Mitja Mahorič | Perutnina Ptuj | 13 |
| 3 | (Slovenia) Gregor Zagorc | Ekipa Dolenjska | 11 |
| 4 | (Italy) Dario David Cioni | Mapei-Quick Step | 10 |
| 5 | (Slovenia) Dean Podgornik | Sava Kranj | 9 |

=== Team classification ===
| Rank | Team | Time |
|---|---|---|
| 1 | (Slovenia) Krka Telekom | 62h 08' 34" |
| 2 | (Italy) Mapei - Quick Step | + 12′ 51″ |
| 3 | (United Kingdom) Amore & Vita | + 24′ 01″ |
| 4 | (Canada) Kanada | + 24′ 11″ |
| 5 | (Germany) Team Coast | + 29′ 14″ |
| ... | ... | ... |
| 6 | (Slovenia) Perutnina Ptuj Radenska Rog | + 32′ 27″ |
| 8 | (Slovenia) Sava Kranj | + 40′ 26″ |
| 12 | (Slovenia) Perutnina Ptuj | + 1h 18′ 36″ |
