= 2005 Tour of Slovenia =

UCI Europe Tour (2.1 race)

Race details
- Dates: 9–12 June 2005
- Stages: 4
- Distance: 611 km (379.7 mi)
- Winning time: 15h 34' 33"

Results
Jersey awarded to the overall winner	Winner	(Poland) Przemysław Niemiec
	Second	(Italy) Fortunato Baliani
	Third	(Croatia) Radoslav Rogina
Jersey awarded to the points classification winner	Points	(Italy) Ruggero Marzoli
Jersey awarded to the mountains classification winner	Mountains	(Poland) Przemysław Niemiec
Jersey awarded to the youth classification winner	Youth	(Slovenia) Janez Brajkovič
	Team	(Bulgaria) Miche

The 2005 Tour of Slovenia (Slovene: Dirka po Sloveniji) was the 12th edition of the Tour of Slovenia, categorized as 2.1 stage race (UCI Europe Tour) held between 9 and 12 June 2005.

The race consisted of 4 stages with 611 km (379.7 mi) in total.

== Teams ==
Total 123 riders (75 finished it) from 16 teams started the race.

=== Pro Continental ===
- (Italy) Acqua & Sapone–Adria Mobil
- (Italy) Ceramica Panaria–Navigare
- (Bulgaria) Miche
- (Republic of Ireland) Tenax–Nobili Rubinetterie

=== Continental ===
- (Slovenia) Perutnina Ptuj
- (Slovenia) Sava
- (Slovenia) KRKA–Adria Mobil
- (Slovenia) Radenska–Rog
- (Japan) Team Nippo
- (Italy) Androni Giocattoli–3C Casalinghi
- (Poland) Amore & Vita–Beretta
- (Austria) Volksbank–Leingrüber Ideal
- (Netherlands) Rabobank Continental Team
- (Czech Republic) Ed' System ZVVZ

=== National ===
- Slovenia
- Austria

== Route and stages ==
Stage characteristics and winners
Stage	Date	Course	Length	Type	Winner
1	9 June	Ptuj – Ptuj	160 km (99 mi)	Hilly stage	(Italy) Ruggero Marzoli
2	10 June	Medvode – Beljak/Villach (Austria)	171 km (106 mi)	Intermediate stage	(Italy) Marco Marcato
3	11 June	Trbiž/Tarvisio (Italy) – Vršič	133 km (83 mi)	Mountain stage	(Poland) Przemysław Niemiec
4	12 June	Šentjernej – Novo mesto	147 km (91 mi)	Hilly stage	(Slovenia) Boštjan Mervar
Total		611 km (379.7 mi)			

== Classification leadership ==
Classification leadership by stage
Stage	Winner	General classification	Points classification	Mountains classification	Young rider classification	Team classification
1	Ruggero Marzoli	Ruggero Marzoli	Ruggero Marzoli	Wolfgang Murer	Simon Špilak	Rabobank
2	Marco Marcato	Ruggero Marzoli	Ruggero Marzoli	Matej Stare	Marco Marcato	Team Androni Giocattoli-3C
3	Przemysław Niemiec	Przemysław Niemiec	Ruggero Marzoli	Fraser MacMaster	Janez Brajkovič	Miche
4	Boštjan Mervar	Przemysław Niemiec	Ruggero Marzoli	Przemysław Niemiec	Janez Brajkovič	Miche
Final		Przemysław Niemiec	Ruggero Marzoli	Przemysław Niemiec	Janez Brajkovič	Miche

== Final classification standings ==
Legend
Denotes the leader of the general classification	Denotes the leader of the mountains classification
Denotes the leader of the points classification	Denotes the leader of the young rider classification
Denotes the leader of the team classification	

=== General classification ===
Rank	Rider	Team	Time
1	(Poland) Przemysław Niemiec	Miche	15h 34' 33"
2	(Italy) Fortunato Baliani	Ceramica Panaria-Navigare	+ 30"
3	(Croatia) Radoslav Rogina	Tenax-Nobili Rubinetterie	+ 35"
4	(Italy) Raffaele Ferrara	Team Androni Giocattoli-3C Casalinghi	+ 50"
5	(Slovenia) Jani Brajkovič	KRKA-Adria Mobil	+ 54"
6	(Slovenia) Valter Bonča	Sava	+ 55"
7	(Slovenia) Mitja Mahorič	Perutnina Ptuj	+ 59"
8	(Croatia) Robert Kišerlovski	KRKA-Adria Mobil	+ 1' 02"
9	(Poland) Slawomir Kohut	Miche	+ 1' 09"
10	(Croatia) Matija Kvasina	Perutnina Ptuj	+ 1' 13"

=== Points classification ===
Rank	Rider	Team	Points
1	(Italy) Ruggero Marzoli	Acqua & Sapone-Adria Mobil	65
2	(Germany) Rene Weissinger	Volksbank Leingruber Ideal	42
3	(Italy) Marco Marcato	Team Androni Giocattoli-3C Casalinghi	37
4	(Mexico) Juan Magallanes Aranda	Team Androni Giocattoli-3C Casalinghi	36
5	(Slovenia) Boštjan Mervar	Perutnina Ptuj	35
6	(Slovenia) Uroš Murn	Slovenija	30
7	(Poland) Przemysław Niemiec	Miche	25
8	(Slovenia) Matej Stare	Perutnina Ptuj	25
9	(Italy) Maurizio Carta	Miche	22
10	(Slovenia) Mitja Mahorič	Perutnina Ptuj	21

=== Mountains classification ===
Rank	Rider	Team	Points
1	(Poland) Przemysław Niemiec	Miche	15
2	(New Zealand) Fraser MacMaster	Volksbank Leingruber Ideal	11
3	(Slovenia) Matej Stare	Perutnina Ptuj	10
4	(Slovenia) Matic Strgar	Radenska Rog	7
5	(Slovenia) Rok Jerše	Sava	6

=== Young rider classification ===
Rank	Rider	Team	Time
1	(Slovenia) Jani Brajkovič	KRKA-Adria Mobil	15h 35' 27"
2	(Croatia) Robert Kišerlovski	KRKA-Adria Mobil	+ 08"
3	(Slovenia) Miha Švab	KRKA-Adria Mobil	+ 35"
4	(Netherlands) Lars Boom	Rabobank	+ 1' 27"
5	(Slovenia) Jure Kocjan	Radenska Rog	+ 1' 47"

=== Team classification ===
Rank	Team	Time
1	(Bulgaria) Miche	46h 46′ 48″
2	(Slovenia) Krka Adria Mobil	+ 20″
3	(Slovenia) Perutnina Ptuj	+ 01′ 19″
4	(Italy) Team Androni Giocattoli-3C	+ 03′ 33″
5	(Slovenia) Sava Kranj	+ 05′ 14″
6	(Slovenia) Radenska Rog	+ 06′ 54″
7	(Czech Republic) eD'system - ZVVZ	+ 7′ 10″
8	(Republic of Ireland) Tenax-Nobili Rubinetterie	+ 7′ 34″
9	(Italy) Acqua & Sapone-Adria Mobil	+ 9′ 01″
10	(Netherlands) Rabobank	+ 13′ 34″
