= 2001 Tour of Slovenia =

UCI‑2.5 race

Race details
- Dates: 8–13 May 2001
- Stages: 7
- Distance: 1,005.5 km (624.8 mi)
- Winning time: 24h 44' 58"

Results
Jersey awarded to the overall winner	Winner	(Russia) Faat Zahirov
	Second	(Slovenia) Martin Derganc
	Third	(Croatia) Vladimir Miholjević
Jersey awarded to the points classification winner	Points	(Russia) Faat Zahirov
Jersey awarded to the mountains classification winner	Mountains	(Slovenia) Matej Marin
Jersey awarded to the young rider classification winner	Young rider	(Slovenia) Radoslav Rogina
Jersey awarded to the sprints classification winner	Sprints	(Italy) Filippo Baldo
	Team	(Poland) Amore & Vita–Beretta

The 2001 Tour of Slovenia (Slovene: Dirka po Sloveniji) was the 8th edition of the Tour of Slovenia, categorized as UCI‑2.5 stage race held between 8 and 13 May 2001.

The race consisted of 7 stages with 1,005.5 km (624.8 mi) in total.

== Teams ==
Total 117 riders (59 finished it) from 16 teams started the race.

=== Professional ===
- (Slovenia) KRKA–Telekom Slovenije
- (Poland) Amore & Vita–Beretta
- (Slovakia) De Nardi–Pasta Montegrappa
- (Belgium) Mapei–Quick-Step
- (Poland) Mróz–Supradyn Witaminy
- (Poland) Ceresit–CCC–Mat
- (Switzerland) KIA-Suisse
- (United States) DeFeet-Lemond
- (Netherlands) Van Vliet Weba

=== Amateur ===
- (Slovenia) Radenska Rog
- (Slovenia) Dolenjska (Krka Telekom U23)
- (Slovenia) Perutnina Ptuj
- (Slovenia) Savaprojekt Krško
- (Slovenia) Sava Kranj

=== National ===
- Austria

== Route and stages ==
Stage characteristics and winners
Stage	Date	Course	Length	Type	Winner
1	8 May	Čatež – Beltinci	190 km (118 mi)	Plain stage	(Italy) Stefano Zanini
2	9 May	Radenci – Ptuj	120 km (75 mi)	Plain stage	(Slovenia) Boštjan Mervar
3	9 May	Zreče – Rogla	16.5 km (10 mi)	Mountain time trial	(Russia) Faat Zakirov
4	10 May	Maribor – Ljubljana	168 km (104 mi)	Hillystage	(Slovenia) Dean Podgornik
5	11 May	Ivančna Gorica – Ajdovščina	175 km (109 mi)	Mountain stage	(Poland) Seweryn Kohut
6	12 May	Sežana – Vršič	158 km (98 mi)	Mountain stage	(Russia) Faat Zakirov
7	13 May	Ribnica – Novo mesto	178 km (111 mi)	Plain stage	(Lithuania) Remigius Lupeikis
Total		1,005.5 km (624.8 mi)			

== Classification leadership ==
Classification leadership by stage
Stage	Winner	General classification	Points classification	Mountains classification	Young rider classification	Intermediate sprints classification	Team classification
1	Stefano Zanini	Stefano Zanini	Stefano Zanini	Boštjan Kavčnik	Matej Marin	Boštjan Kavčnik	Van Vliet Weba
2	Boštjan Mervar	Boštjan Mervar	not available	not available	not available	not available	not available
3	Faat Zakirov	Faat Zakirov	Boštjan Mervar	Boštjan Kavčnik	Radoslav Rogina	Matej Marin	Amore & Vita-Beretta
4	Dean Podgornik	Faat Zakirov	Boštjan Mervar	not available	not available	not available	KRKA Telekom
5	Seweryn Kohut	Vladimir Miholjević	Boštjan Mervar	not available	not available	not available	Amore & Vita-Beretta
6	Faat Zakirov	Faat Zakirov	Faat Zakirov	Matej Marin	not available	Vladimir Miholjević	Amore & Vita-Beretta
7	Remigius Lupeikis	Faat Zakirov	Faat Zakirov	Matej Marin	Filippo Baldo	Radoslav Rogina	Amore & Vita-Beretta
Final		Faat Zakirov	Faat Zakirov	Matej Marin	Filippo Baldo	Radoslav Rogina	Amore & Vita

== Final classification standings ==
Legend
Denotes the leader of the general classification	Denotes the leader of the mountains classification
Denotes the leader of the points classification	Denotes the leader of the young rider classification
Denotes the winner of the int. sprints classification	Denotes the leader of the team classification

=== General classification ===
Rank	Rider	Team	Time
1	(Russia) Faat Zakirov	Amore&Vita-Beretta	24h 44' 58"
2	(Slovenia) Martin Derganc	Krka Telekom	+ 1' 09"
3	(Croatia) Vladimir Miholjević	Krka Telekom	+ 1' 23"
4	(Poland) Seweryn Kohut	Amore&Vita-Beretta	+ 2' 20"
5	(Poland) Slawomir Kohut	Amore&Vita-Beretta	+ 3' 54"
6	(Italy) Luca Belluomini	CCC Mat	+ 5' 05"
7	(Poland) Jaroslaw Rebiewski	CCC Mat	+ 5' 34"
8	(Austria) Martin Mosers	Austria	+ 6' 35"
9	(Italy) Simone Mori	KIA-Suisse	+ 7' 33"
10	(Austria) Jürgen Pauritsch	Austria	+ 8' 26"

=== Points classification ===
Rank	Rider	Team	Points
1	(Russia) Faat Zakirov	Amore&Vita-Beretta	55
2	(Croatia) Vladimir Miholjević	Krka Telekom	48
3	(Poland) Seweryn Kohut	Amore&Vita-Beretta	48
4	(Slovenia) Boštjan Mervar	Krka Telekom	45
5	(Slovenia) Martin Derganc	Krka Telekom	43

=== Mountains classification ===
Rank	Rider	Team	Points
1	(Slovenia) Matej Marin	Perutnina Ptuj	23
2	(Italy) Filippo Baldo	KIA-Suisse	21
3	(Slovenia) Branko Filip	Krka Telekom	6
4	(Austria) Bernhard Eisel	Mapei-Quick Step	6
5	(Croatia) Radoslav Rogina	Perutnina Ptuj	5

=== Young rider classification ===
Rank	Rider	Team	Time
1	(Croatia) Radoslav Rogina	Perutnina Ptuj	24h 54' 13"
2	(Croatia) Hrvoje Miholjević	Sava Kranj	+ 1' 37"
3	(Slovenia) Darko Mrvar	Dolenjska	+ 1' 57"
4	(Croatia) Massimo Demarin	Perutnina Ptuj	+ 5' 21"
5	(Slovenia) Marko Žepič	Sava Kranj	+ 7' 39"

=== Intermediate sprints classification ===
Rank	Rider	Team	Points
1	(Italy) Filippo Baldo	KIA-Suisse	15
2	(Croatia) Vladimir Miholjević	Krka Telekom	13
3	(Poland) Seweryn Kohut	Amore&Vita-Beretta	13
4	(Russia) Faat Zakirov	Amore&Vita-Beretta	10
5	(Slovenia) Martin Derganc	Krka Telekom	6

=== Team classification ===
Rank	Team	Time
1	(Poland) Amore&Vita-Beretta	62h 08' 34"
2	(Slovenia) Krka Telekom	+ 5′ 04″
3	(Belgium) Mapei-Quick Step	+ 22′ 47″
4	(Slovenia) Perutnina Ptuj	+ 26′ 38″
5	(Poland) CCC Mat	+ 27′ 56″
...	...	...
7	(Slovenia) Radenska Rog Mix	+ 31′ 49″
8	(Slovenia) Sava Kranj	+ 32′ 02″
11	(Slovenia) Dolenjska	+ 1h 43′ 29″
