= 2012 Tour of Slovenia =

UCI Europe Tour (2.1 race)

Race details
- Dates: 14–17 June 2012
- Stages: 4
- Distance: 566.2 km (351.8 mi)
- Winning time: 14h 20' 42"

Results
Jersey awarded to the overall winner	Winner	(Slovenia) Janez Brajkovič
	Second	(Italy) Domenico Pozzovivo
	Third	(Portugal) Bruno Pires (Note: All Kristjan Koren's results from 2011 and 2012 were subsequently deleted due to doping in 2019.)
Jersey awarded to the points classification winner	Points	(Italy) Simone Ponzi
Jersey awarded to the mountains classification winner	Mountains	(Belgium) Preben Van Hecke
Jersey awarded to the youth classification winner	Youth	(Slovenia) Jan Polanc
	Team	(Croatia) Loborika Favorit Team

The 2012 Tour of Slovenia (Slovene: Dirka po Sloveniji) was the 19th edition of the Tour of Slovenia, categorized as 2.1 stage race (UCI Europe Tour) held between 14 and 17 June 2012.

The race consisted of 4 stages with 566.2 km (351.8 mi) in total.

The yellow jersey reserved for overall classification since the 1st edition, was replaced with blue jersey, because Planet–Siol.net company was the new main sponsor, which turned out to be the only time.

== Teams ==
Total 117 riders (99 finished it) from 15 teams started the race.

=== UCI ProTeams ===
- (Kazakhstan) Astana
- (Denmark) Saxo Bank–Tinkoff Bank
- (Italy) Farnese Vini–Selle Italia
- (Italy) Colnago–CSF Bardiani
- (Italy) Liquigas–Cannondale
- (Belgium) Topsport Vlaanderen–Mercator
- (Italy) Lampre–ISD
- (Australia) Orica–GreenEDGE

=== UCI Professional Continental ===
- (Italy) Acqua & Sapone

=== UCI Continental ===
- (Slovenia) Adria Mobil
- (Slovenia) Radenska
- (Slovenia) Sava
- (Austria) Tirol Cycling Team
- (Italy) Team Idea
- (Croatia) Loborika Favorit Team

== Route and stages ==
Stage characteristics and winners
Stage	Date	Course	Length	Type	Winner
1	14 June	Celje – Novo mesto	152 km (94 mi)	Intermediate stage	(Italy) Simone Ponzi
2	15 June	Kočevje – Metlika	177.4 km (110 mi)	Intermediate stage	(South Africa) Daryl Impey
3	16 June	Ivančna Gorica – Škofja Loka	219 km (136 mi)	Mountain stage	(Italy) Domenico Pozzovivo
4	17 June	Ljubljana – Ljubljana	17.8 km (11 mi)	Individual time trial	(Italy) Adriano Malori (Slovenia) ~~Kristjan Koren~~
Total		566.2 km (351.8 mi)			

== Classification leadership ==
Classification leadership by stage
Stage	Winner	General classification	Points classification	Mountains classification	Young rider classification	Team classification
1	Simone Ponzi	Simone Ponzi	Simone Ponzi	Klemen Štimulak	Arthur Vanoverberghe	not awarded
2	Daryl Impey	Simone Ponzi	not awarded	Klemen Štimulak	Jan Polanc	not awarded
3	Domenico Pozzovivo	Domenico Pozzovivo	not awarded	Preben Van Hecke	Jan Polanc	not awarded
4	~~Kristjan Koren~~; Adriano Malori	Janez Brajkovič	~~Kristjan Koren~~; Simone Ponzi	Preben Van Hecke	Jan Polanc	Loborika Favorit Team
Final		Janez Brajkovič	~~Kristjan Koren~~ Simone Ponzi	Preben Van Hecke	Jan Polanc	Loborika Favorit Team

== Final classification standings ==
Legend
Denotes the leader of the general classification	Denotes the leader of the mountains classification
Denotes the leader of the points classification	Denotes the leader of the young rider classification
Denotes the leader of the team classification	

=== General classification ===
Rank	Rider	Team	Time
1	(Slovenia) Janez Brajkovič	Astana	14h 20' 42"
2	(Italy) Domenico Pozzovivo	Colnago–CSF Bardiani	+ 06"
DSQ	~~(Slovenia) Kristjan Koren~~	~~Liquigas–Cannondale~~	~~+ 1' 16"~~
3	(Portugal) Bruno Pires	Saxo Bank–Tinkoff Bank	+ 2' 12"
4	(Italy) Matteo Rabottini	Farnese Vini–Selle Italia	+ 2' 23"
5	(Germany) Dominik Nerz	Liquigas–Cannondale	+ 2' 35"
6	(Slovenia) Jure Golčer	Tirol Cycling Team	+ 2' 39"
7	(Italy) Daniele Ratto	Liquigas–Cannondale	+ 2' 45"
8	(Slovenia) Tomaž Nose	Adria Mobil	+ 0' 45"
9	(Colombia) Winner Anacona	Lampre–ISD	+ 2' 51"
10	(Italy) Francesco Failli	Farnese Vini–Selle Italia	+ 2' 53"

=== Points classification ===
Rank	Rider	Team	Points
DSQ	~~(Slovenia) Kristjan Koren~~	~~Liquigas–Cannondale~~	~~65~~
1	(Italy) Simone Ponzi	Astana	45
2	(Italy) Daniele Ratto	Liquigas–Cannondale	44
3	(South Africa) Daryl Impey	Orica–GreenEDGE	
4	(Italy) Domenico Pozzovivo	Colnago–CSF Bardiani	
5	(Slovenia) Janez Brajkovič	Astana	
6	(Belgium) Preben Van Hecke	Topsport Vlaanderen–Mercator	
7	(Italy) Francesco Failli	Farnese Vini–Selle Italia	
8	(Italy) Adriano Malori	Lampre–ISD	
9	(Italy) Francesco Reda	Acqua & Sapone	

=== Mountains classification ===
Rank	Rider	Team	Time
1	(Belgium) Preben Van Hecke	Topsport Vlaanderen–Mercator	30
2	(Slovenia) Klemen Štimulak	Radenska	25
3	(Slovenia) Janez Brajkovič	Astana	12
4	(Ukraine) Vitaliy Buts	Lampre–ISD	
5	(Italy) Domenico Pozzovivo	Colnago–CSF Bardiani	
6	(Italy) Andrea Pasqualon	Colnago–CSF Bardiani	
7	(Australia) David Tanner	Saxo Bank–Tinkoff Bank	
8	(Slovenia) Tomaž Nose	Adria Mobil	
9	(Austria) Harald Totschnig	Tirol Cycling Team	
10	(Portugal) Bruno Pires	Saxo Bank–Tinkoff Bank	

=== Young rider classification ===
Rank	Rider	Team	Time
1	(Slovenia) Jan Polanc	Radenska	14h 27' 24"
2	(Belgium) Preben Van Hecke	Topsport Vlaanderen–Mercator	+ 10' 58"
3	(Belgium) Arthur Vanoverberghe	Topsport Vlaanderen–Mercator	+ 11' 11"
4	(Slovenia) Jan Tratnik	Radenska	+ 15' 03"
5	(Slovenia) Jan Tratnik	Radenska	+ 16' 29"
6	(Slovenia) Jan Tratnik	Radenska	+ 18' 59"
7	(Slovenia) Klemen Štimulak	Radenska	+ 23' 16"
8	(Slovenia) Tim Mikelj	Sava	+ 29' 59"
9	(Slovenia) Mark Džamastagič	Sava	+ 34' 00"
10	(Austria) Maximilian Kuen	Tirol Cycling Team	+ 36' 46"
