= 2010 Tour of Slovenia =

UCI Europe Tour (2.1 race)

Race details
- Dates: 17–20 June 2010
- Stages: 4
- Distance: 667 km (414.5 mi)
- Winning time: 16h 18' 22"

Results
Jersey awarded to the overall winner	Winner	(Italy) Vincenzo Nibali
	Second	(Italy) Giovanni Visconti
	Third	(Denmark) Chris Anker Sørensen
Jersey awarded to the points classification winner	Points	(Slovenia) Grega Bole
Jersey awarded to the mountains classification winner	Mountains	(France) Stéphane Rossetto
Jersey awarded to the youth classification winner	Youth	(Slovenia) Blaž Furdi
	Team	(Denmark) Team Saxo Bank

The 2010 Tour of Slovenia (Slovene: Dirka po Sloveniji) was the 17th edition of the Tour of Slovenia, categorized as 2.1 stage race (UCI Europe Tour) held between 17 and 20 June 2010.

The race consisted of 4 stages with 667 km (414.5 mi) in total.

== Teams ==
Total 109 riders (101 finished it) from 14 teams started the race.

=== UCI ProTeams ===
- (Belgium) Topsport Vlaanderen–Mercator
- (Denmark) Team Saxo Bank
- (Italy) Liquigas–Doimo
- (Italy) Lampre–Farnese Vini
- (Netherlands) Vacansoleil

=== UCI Professional Continental ===
- (Italy) Acqua & Sapone
- (Spain) Xacobeo–Galicia

=== UCI Continental ===
- (Slovenia) Adria Mobil
- (Slovenia) Zheroquadro–Radenska
- (Slovenia) Sava
- (Croatia) Loborika
- (Italy) ISD–NERI
- (Republic of Ireland) Ceramica Flaminia
- (Slovenia) Obrazi Delo Revije

== Route and stages ==
Stage characteristics and winners
Stage	Date	Course	Length	Type	Winner
1	17 June	Koper – Medvode	173 km (107 mi)		(Slovenia) Grega Bole
2	18 June	Ljubljana – Villach (Austria)	166 km (103 mi)		(Slovenia) Grega Bole
3	19 June	Bled – Krvavec	171 km (106 mi)	Mountain stage	(Italy) Vincenzo Nibali
4	20 June	Brežice – Novo mesto	157 km (98 mi)		(Italy) Francesco Chicchi
Total		667 km (414.5 mi)			

== Classification leadership ==
Classification leadership by stage
Stage	Winner	General classification	Points classification	Mountains classification	Young rider classification	Team classification
1	Grega Bole	Grega Bole	Grega Bole	Stéphane Rossetto	Marko Kump	not available
2	Grega Bole	Grega Bole	Grega Bole	not available	Blaž Furdi	not available
3	Vincenzo Nibali	Vincenzo Nibali	Grega Bole	not available	Blaž Furdi	not available
4	Francesco Chicchi	Vincenzo Nibali	Grega Bole	Stéphane Rossetto	Blaž Furdi	Team Saxo Bank
Final		Vincenzo Nibali	Grega Bole	Stéphane Rossetto	Blaž Furdi	Team Saxo Bank

== Final classification standings ==
Legend
Denotes the leader of the general classification	Denotes the leader of the mountains classification
Denotes the leader of the points classification	Denotes the leader of the young rider classification
Denotes the leader of the team classification	

=== General classification ===
Rank	Rider	Team	Time
1	(Italy) Vincenzo Nibali	Liquigas–Doimo	16h 18' 22"
2	(Italy) Giovanni Visconti	ISD–NERI	+ 41"
3	(Denmark) Chris Anker Sørensen	Team Saxo Bank	+ 51"
4	(Italy) Andrea Noè	Ceramica Flaminia	+ 55"
5	(Colombia) Cayetano Sarmiento	Acqua & Sapone	+ 55"
6	(Denmark) Anders Lund	Team Saxo Bank	1' 08"
7	(Spain) Marcos García	Xacobeo–Galicia	1' 08"
8	(Slovenia) Gašper Švab	Sava	1' 58"
9	(Slovenia) Grega Bole	Lampre–Farnese Vini	2' 00"
10	(Slovenia) Mitja Mahorič	Adria Mobil	2' 08"

=== Points classification ===
Rank	Rider	Team	Points
1	(Slovenia) Grega Bole	Lampre–Farnese Vini	67
2	(Italy) Giovanni Visconti	ISD–NERI	47
3	(Slovenia) Marko Kump	Adria Mobil	34
4	(Italy) Vincenzo Nibali	Liquigas–Doimo	29
5	(Slovenia) Blaž Furdi	Sava	27
6	(Italy) Daniele Bennati	Liquigas–Doimo	27
7	(Italy) Francesco Chicchi	Liquigas–Doimo	25
8	(Slovenia) Borut Božič	Vacansoleil	24
9	(Belgium) Michael Van Staeyen	Topsport Vlaanderen–Mercator	24
10	(Poland) Jaroslaw Marycz	Team Saxo Bank	23

=== Mountains classification ===
Rank	Rider	Team	Points
1	(France) Stéphane Rossetto	Vacansoleil	18
2	(Italy) Vincenzo Nibali	Liquigas–Doimo	16
3	(Slovenia) Luka Rakuša	ISD–NERI	12
4	(Slovenia) Vladimir Kerkez	Sava	8
5	(Italy) Giovanni Visconti	ISD–NERI	8
6	(Denmark) Chris Anker Sørensen	Team Saxo Bank	6
7	(Tunisia) Rafaâ Chtioui	Acqua & Sapone	6
8	(Spain) Marcos García	Xacobeo–Galicia	6
9	(Italy) Gianluca Mirenda	ISD–NERI	6
10	(Germany) Danilo Hondo	Lampre–Farnese Vini	6

=== Young rider classification ===
Rank	Rider	Team	Time
1	(Slovenia) Blaž Furdi	Sava	16h 18' 22"
2	(Slovenia) Luka Mezgec	Zheroquadro–Radenska	1' 20"
3	(Italy) Alfredo Balloni	Lampre–Farnese Vini	2' 44"
4	(Slovenia) Jan Tratnik	Zheroquadro–Radenska	4' 58"
5	(Slovenia) Marko Kump	Adria Mobil	12' 10"
6	(Belgium) Michael Van Staeyen	Topsport Vlaanderen–Mercator	13' 35"
7	(Slovenia) Blaž Jarc	Adria Mobil	15' 57"
8	(Slovenia) Jure Bitenc	Obrazi Delo Revije	17' 28"
9	(Slovenia) Mark Džamagastič	Sava	18' 50"
10	(Slovenia) Andi Bajc	Zheroquadro–Radenska	24' 48"

=== Team classification ===
Rank	Team	Time
1	(Denmark) Team Saxo Bank	49h 01' 36"
2	(Italy) Acqua & Sapone	+ 6"
3	(Italy) Liquigas–Doimo	+ 12"
4	(Slovenia) Sava	+ 1' 25"
5	(Republic of Ireland) Ceramica Flaminia	+ 3' 13"
6	(Spain) Xacobeo–Galicia	+ 3' 29"
7	(Italy) ISD–NERI	+ 4' 44"
8	(Slovenia) Zheroquadro–Radenska	+ 6' 57"
9	(Netherlands) Vacansoleil	+ 12' 09"
10	(Croatia) Loborika	+ 13' 20"
