= 2011 Tour of Slovenia =

UCI Europe Tour (2.1 race)

Race details
- Dates: 16–19 June 2011
- Stages: 4
- Distance: 547.8 km (340.4 mi)
- Winning time: 13h 42' 46"

Results
Jersey awarded to the overall winner	Winner	(Italy) Diego Ulissi
	Second	(Croatia) Radoslav Rogina
	Third	(Slovenia) Robert Vrečer
Jersey awarded to the points classification winner	Points	(Slovenia) Robert Vrečer (Note: All Kristjan Koren's results from 2011 and 2012 were subsequently deleted due to doping in 2019.)
Jersey awarded to the mountains classification winner	Mountains	(Italy) Diego Ulissi
Jersey awarded to the youth classification winner	Youth	(Italy) Diego Ulissi
	Team	(Croatia) Loborika Favorit Team

The 2011 Tour of Slovenia (Slovene: Dirka po Sloveniji) was the 18th edition of the Tour of Slovenia, categorized as 2.1 stage race (UCI Europe Tour) held between 16 and 19 June 2011.

The race consisted of 4 stages with 547.8 kilometres (340.4 mi) in total.

== Teams ==
Total 115 riders (97 finished it) from 15 teams started the race.

=== UCI ProTeams ===
- (Belgium) Topsport Vlaanderen–Mercator
- (Denmark) Saxo Bank–SunGard
- (Italy) Farnese Vini–Neri Sottoli
- (Italy) Liquigas–Cannondale
- (Italy) Lampre–ISD

=== UCI Professional Continental ===
- (Italy) Acqua & Sapone
- (Spain) Geox–TMC
- (France) Cofidis

=== UCI Continental ===
- (Slovenia) Adria Mobil
- (Slovenia) Radenska
- (Slovenia) Perutnina Ptuj
- (Slovenia) Sava
- (Croatia) Loborika Favorit Team
- (Italy) D'Angelo & Antenucci–Nippo
- (Turkey) Konya–Şekerspor–Torku–Vivelo

== Route and stages ==
Stage characteristics and winners
Stage	Date	Course	Length	Type	Winner
1	16 June	Ljubljana – Ljubljana	6.6 km (4 mi)	Individual time trial	(Slovenia) Robert Vrečer
2	17 June	Koper – Nova Gorica	189.6 km (118 mi)		(Italy) Elia Viviani
3	18 June	Tržič – Golte	170.6 km (106 mi)	Mountain stage	(Italy) Diego Ulissi
4	19 June	Ptuj – Novo mesto	181 km (112 mi)		(Italy) Andrea Guardini
Total		547.8 km (340.4 mi)			

== Classification leadership ==
Classification leadership by stage
Stage	Winner	General classification	Points classification	Mountains classification	Young rider classification	Team classification
1	Robert Vrečer	Robert Vrečer	Robert Vrečer	not awarded	Diego Ulissi	Liquigas–Cannondale
2	Elia Viviani	Robert Vrečer	~~Kristjan Koren~~; Giovanni Visconti	not awarded	Diego Ulissi	Liquigas–Cannondale
3	Diego Ulissi	Diego Ulissi	~~Kristjan Koren~~; Robert Vrečer	Diego Ulissi	Diego Ulissi	Loborika Favorit Team
4	Andrea Guardini	Diego Ulissi	~~Kristjan Koren~~; Robert Vrečer	Diego Ulissi	Diego Ulissi	Loborika Favorit Team
Final		Diego Ulissi	~~Kristjan Koren~~ Robert Vrečer	Diego Ulissi	Diego Ulissi	Loborika Favorit Team

== Final classification standings ==
Legend
Denotes the leader of the general classification	Denotes the leader of the mountains classification
Denotes the leader of the points classification	Denotes the leader of the young rider classification
Denotes the leader of the team classification	

=== General classification ===
Rank	Rider	Team	Time
1	(Italy) Diego Ulissi	Lampre–ISD	13h 42' 46"
2	(Croatia) Radoslav Rogina	Loborika Favorit Team	+ 36"
3	(Slovenia) Robert Vrečer	Perutnina Ptuj	+ 43"
4	(Italy) Luca Ascani	D'Angelo & Antenucci–Nippo	+ 1' 00"
5	(Slovenia) Simon Špilak	Lampre–ISD	+1' 13"
DSQ	~~(Slovenia) Kristjan Koren~~	~~Liquigas–Cannondale~~	~~+ 1' 27"~~
6	(Spain) Carlos Sastre	Geox–TMC	+ 2' 23"
7	(Croatia) Matija Kvasina	Loborika Favorit Team	+ 2' 25"
8	(Denmark) Nicki Sørensen	Saxo Bank–SunGard	+ 2' 51"
DSQ	~~(Bulgaria) Vladimir Koev (Note: All Vladimir Koev's results from 2010 and 2011 were deleted, because of to doping that happened in 2006 (1st) and 2010 (2nd time).)~~	~~Konya–Şekerspor–Torku–Vivelo~~	~~+ 3' 01"~~
9	(Switzerland) Marcel Wyss	Geox–TMC	+ 3' 17"
10	(Slovenia) Jure Golčer	Perutnina Ptuj	+ 3' 18"

=== Points classification ===
Rank	Rider	Team	Points
DSQ	~~(Slovenia) Kristjan Koren~~	~~Liquigas–Cannondale~~	~~44~~
1	(Slovenia) Robert Vrečer	Perutnina Ptuj	39
2	(Italy) Diego Ulissi	Lampre–ISD	35
3	(Slovenia) Grega Bole	Lampre–ISD	34
4	(Italy) Elia Viviani	Liquigas–Cannondale	31
5	(Croatia) Radoslav Rogina	Loborika Favorit Team	26
6	(Italy) Andrea Guardini	Farnese Vini–Neri Sottoli	25
7	(Italy) Luca Ascani	D'Angelo & Antenucci–Nippo	24
8	(Slovenia) Blaž Jarc	Adria Mobil	21
9	(Italy) Alessandro Petacchi	Lampre–ISD	21
10	(Belgium) Jens Keukeleire	Cofidis	21

=== Mountains classification ===
Rank	Rider	Team	Points
1	(Italy) Diego Ulissi	Lampre–ISD	12
2	(Slovenia) Grega Bole	Lampre–ISD	12
3	(Croatia) Radoslav Rogina	Loborika Favorit Team	8
4	(Belgium) Sander Armée	Topsport Vlaanderen–Mercator	6
5	(Slovenia) Simon Špilak	Lampre–ISD	6
6	(Slovenia) Nik Burjek	Sava	6
7	(Luxembourg) Laurent Didier	Saxo Bank–SunGard	4
8	(Slovenia) Robert Vrečer	Perutnina Ptuj	4
9	(Slovenia) Andrej Omulec	Loborika Favorit Team	4
10	(Italy) Francesco Di Paolo	Acqua & Sapone	3

=== Young rider classification ===
Rank	Rider	Team	Time
1	(Italy) Diego Ulissi	Lampre–ISD	13h 42' 46"
2	(Poland) Rafał Majka	Saxo Bank–SunGard	+ 5' 20"
3	(Slovenia) Jan Polanc	Radenska	+ 6' 06"
4	(Slovenia) Jan Bostner	Radenska	+ 12' 48"
5	(Slovenia) Klemen Štimulak	Radenska	+ 16' 06"
6	(Slovenia) Tim Mikelj	Sava	+ 17' 22"
7	(Croatia) Deni Baniček	Loborika Favorit Team	+ 18' 36"
8	(Italy) Davide Cimolai	Liquigas–Cannondale	+ 19' 59"
9	(Italy) Elia Viviani	Liquigas–Cannondale	+ 20' 41"
10	(France) Adrien Petit	Cofidis	+ 20' 41"

=== Team classification ===
Rank	Team	Time
1	(Croatia) Loborika Favorit Team	13h 42' 46"
2	(Spain) Geox–TMC	+ 1' 42"
3	(Italy) D'Angelo & Antenucci–Nippo	+ 3' 44"
4	(Belgium) Topsport Vlaanderen–Mercator	+ 6' 36"
5	(Slovenia) Adria Mobil	+ 7' 06"
6	(Denmark) Saxo Bank–SunGard	+ 7' 27"
7	(Italy) Lampre–ISD	+ 8' 21"
8	(Italy) Acqua & Sapone	+ 10' 20"
9	(Slovenia) Sava	+ 10' 44"
10	(Slovenia) Perutnina Ptuj	+ 10' 50"
