= Tour of Slovenia =

Slovenian multi-day road cycling race

Race details
- Date: May (until 2004); June (from 2005)
- Region: Slovenia
- English name: Tour of Slovenia
- Local name: Dirka po Sloveniji (in Slovene)
- Discipline: Road
- Competition: UCI ProSeries (since 2020)
- Type: Stage race
- Organiser: Ciklotour (1993–1997); KK Adria Mobil (from 1998)
- Race director: Bogdan Fink
- Web site: tourofslovenia.si/en/

History
- First edition: 1993
- Editions: 32 (as of 2026)
- First winner: (Slovenia) Boris Premužič
- Most wins: 5 riders with 2 wins each (Note: The two-time winners are Slovenian riders Mitja Mahorič, Jure Golčer, Primož Roglič and Tadej Pogačar, along with Diego Ulissi from Italy.)
- Most recent: (Germany) Florian Lipowitz

Tour of Slovenia (Dirka po Sloveniji) is a five-day road cycling stage race held since 1993.

Between 2005 and 2018, it was organised as a 2.1 race on the UCI Europe Tour. The 2019 edition was classified as a 2.HC race. It became part of the UCI ProSeries in 2020.

Race made a significant progress and importance with more and more international recognition over the years. From the unknown local third class race in the beginnings, it is now part of the world's second tier level of road cycling with world class athletes. In 2017, when Slovenian Tourist Organisation (STO) decided to start promoting country's trademark, its green landscape, on Eurosport 1 and 2, was a huge game changer. All five stages of the race are being broadcast live in about 120 countries all over the world.

World class cyclists such as Rigoberto Urán, Rafał Majka, Primož Roglič, Jakob Fuglsang, Vincenzo Nibali and Tadej Pogačar competed here in the course of their careers and brought the international attention.

In 2017, they introduced green jersey for general classification, representing country's green nature.

Along with the Tour de Suisse, it is the last top level preparatory stage race before Tour de France. Mojca Novak (President of organizing committee) retired 2023, new president is Bogdan Fink.

== Winners ==
=== Overall wins per country ===
Wins	Country
14	Slovenia
6	Italy
2	Poland; Russia; Germany
1	Croatia; Denmark; Estonia; Portugal; Zimbabwe; Norway

=== Top 3 results ===
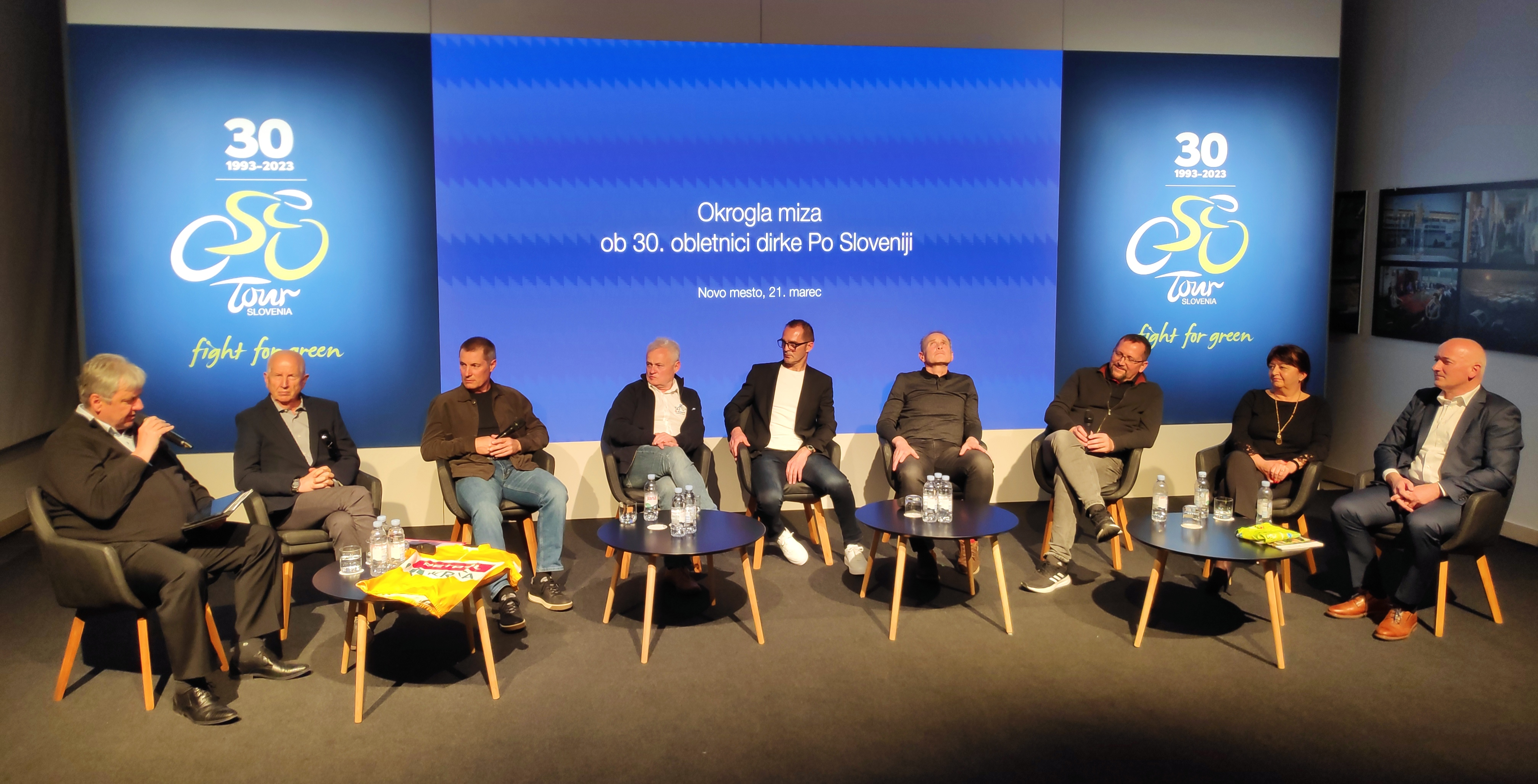
Meeting in 2023, 30 years after first race: (from left) Boris Lozej, Srečko Glivar (2nd in 1993), Boris Premužič (1993 Winner), Gorazd Štangelj (3rd in 1993), Primož Čerin, Martin Hvastija, Mojca Novak (President of organizing committee) and Bogdan Fink (Organizing Director)

Race in 2011

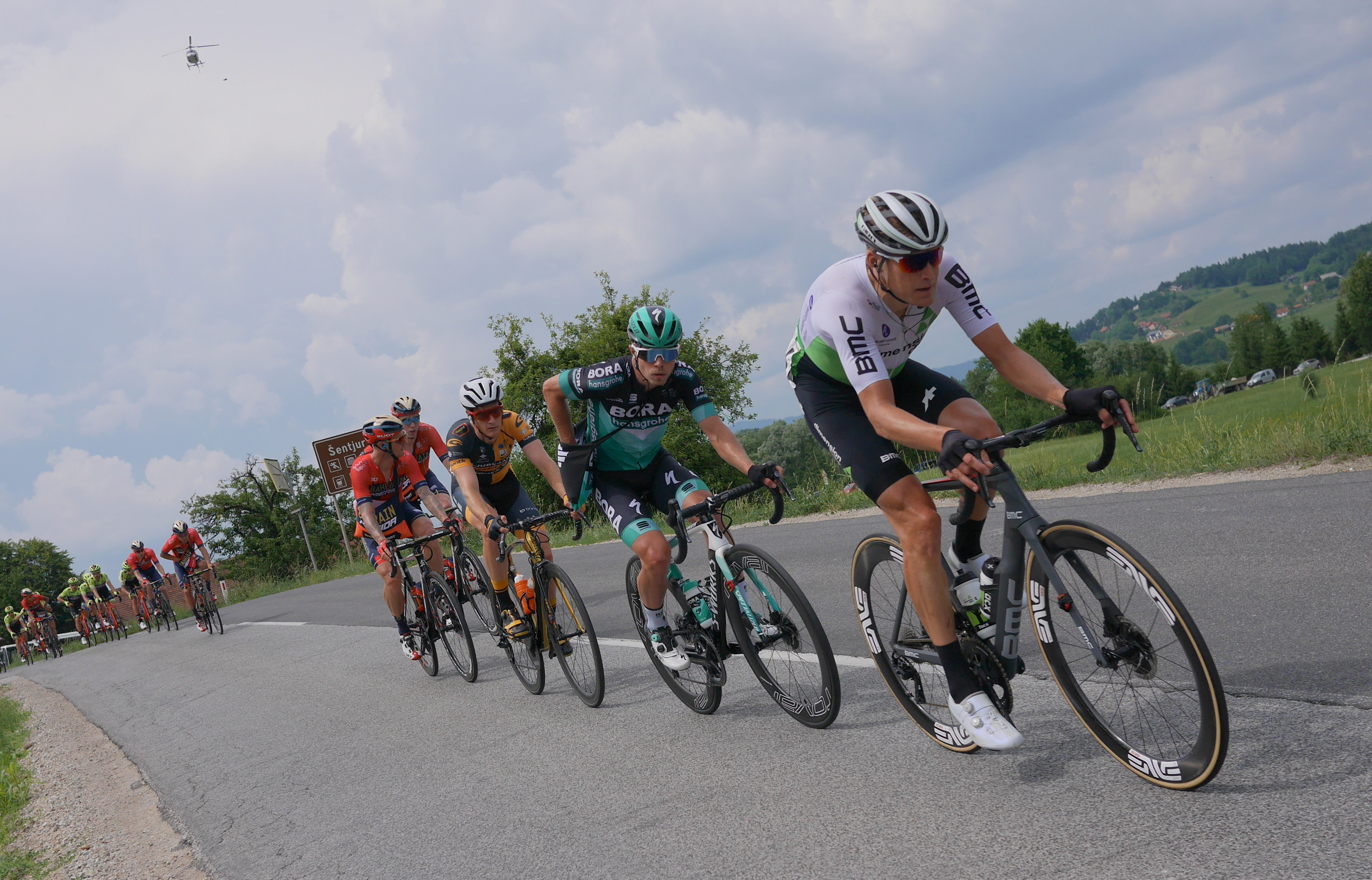
Race in 2019

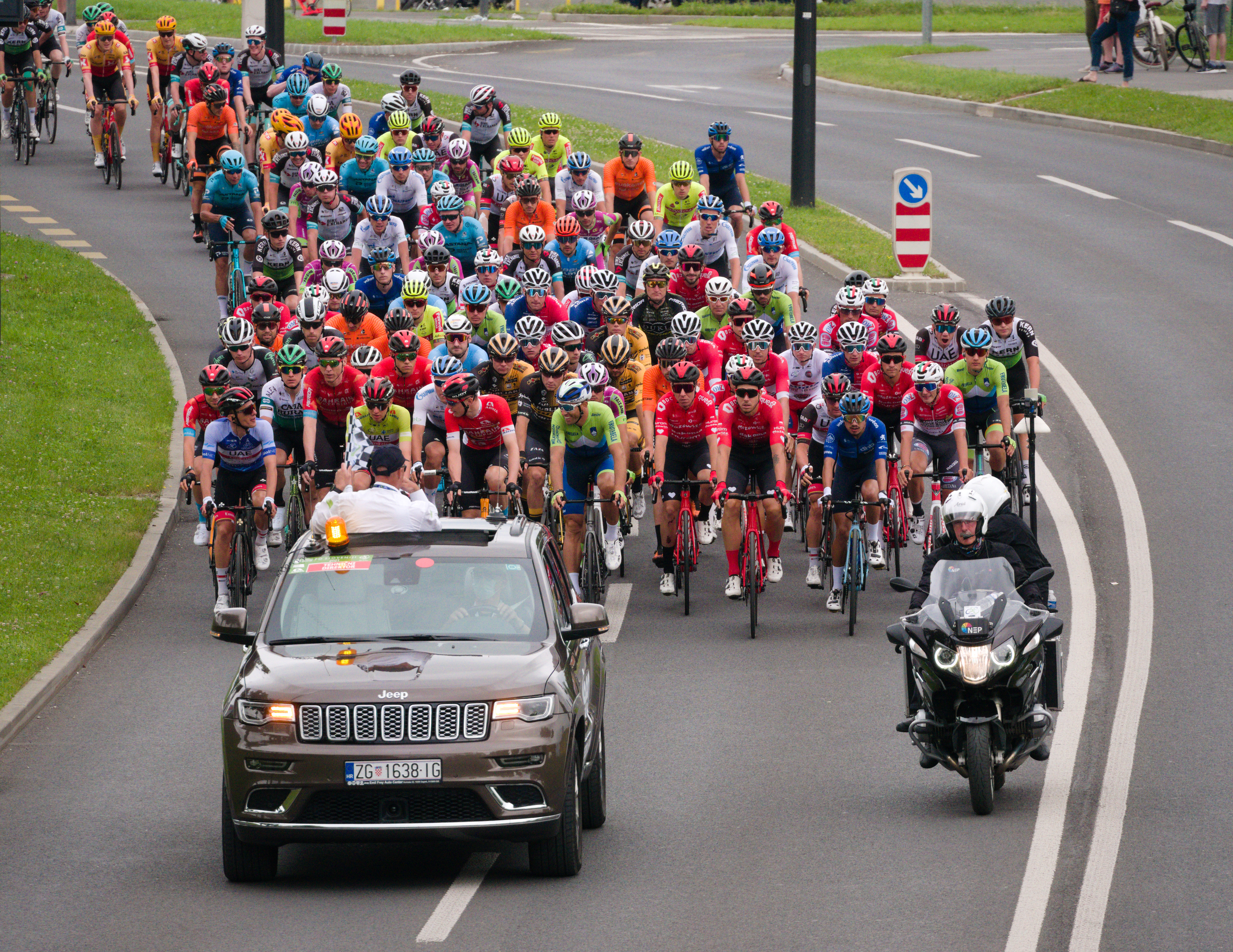
Race in 2021

Year	First	Second	Third
↓ Amateur race ↓
1993	(Slovenia) Boris Premužič	(Slovenia) Srečko Glivar	(Slovenia) Gorazd Štangelj
1994	(Germany) Tobias Steinhauser	(Slovenia) Boris Premužič	(Slovenia) Sandi Papež
↓ Semi‑Pro Open race ↓
1995	(Slovenia) Valter Bonča	(Slovenia) Boris Premužič	(Italy) Marco Antonio Di Renzo
↓ UCI‑5 race ↓
1996	(Italy) Lorenzo Di Silvestro	(Italy) Stefano Giraldi	(Italy) Marco Antonio Di Renzo
1997	cancelled due to financial reasons (Note: Original organiser (Ciklotour) could not solve financial terms, after what organisation was passed to actual organiser Kolesarski klub Telekom with help of Cycling Federation of Slovenia)		
1998	(Slovenia) Branko Filip	(Slovenia) Gorazd Štangelj	(Bulgaria) Pavel Shumanov
1999	(Zimbabwe) Timothy Jones	(Slovenia) Tadej Valjavec	(Italy) Stefano Panetta
↓ UCI‑2.5 race ↓
2000	(Slovenia) Martin Derganc	(Croatia) Vladimir Miholjević	(Slovenia) Boris Premužič
2001	(Russia) Faat Zakirov	(Slovenia) Martin Derganc	(Croatia) Vladimir Miholjević
2002	(Russia) Evgeni Petrov	(Slovenia) Dean Podgornik	(Austria) Hannes Hempel
2003	(Slovenia) Mitja Mahorič	(Slovenia) Jure Golčer	(Austria) Andreas Matzbacher
2004	(Slovenia) Mitja Mahorič	(Belarus) Aleksandr Kuschynski	(Slovenia) Matic Strgar
↓UCI Europe Tour (2.1 race) ↓
2005	(Poland) Przemysław Niemiec	(Italy) Fortunato Baliani	(Croatia) Radoslav Rogina
2006	(Slovenia) Jure Golčer (Note: To the original 2006 race winner Tomaž Nose (Slovenia), was this win taken away in 2008. That's why Jure Golčer (2nd) Przemysław Niemiec (3rd) and Robert Kišerlovski (4th) subsequently each advanced for one place up.)	(Poland) Przemysław Niemiec	(Croatia) Robert Kišerlovski
2007	(Slovenia) Tomaž Nose	(Italy) Vincenzo Nibali	(Italy) Andrea Noè
2008	(Slovenia) Jure Golčer	(Italy) Franco Pellizotti	(Croatia) Robert Kišerlovski
2009	(Denmark) Jakob Fuglsang	(Slovenia) Tomaž Nose	(Italy) Domenico Pozzovivo
2010	(Italy) Vincenzo Nibali	(Italy) Giovanni Visconti	(Denmark) Chris Anker Sørensen
2011	(Italy) Diego Ulissi	(Croatia) Radoslav Rogina	(Slovenia) Robert Vrečer
2012	(Slovenia) Janez Brajkovič	(Italy) Domenico Pozzovivo	(Slovenia) Kristijan Koren
2013	(Croatia) Radoslav Rogina	(Slovenia) Jan Polanc	(Germany) Patrik Sinkewitz
2014	(Portugal) Tiago Machado	(Russia) Ilnur Zakarin	(Italy) Matteo Rabottini
2015	(Slovenia) Primož Roglič	(Spain) Mikel Nieve	(Slovenia) Jure Golčer
2016	(Estonia) Rein Taaramäe	(Australia) Jack Haig	(Czech Republic) Jan Bárta
2017	(Poland) Rafał Majka	(Italy) Giovanni Visconti	(Australia) Jack Haig
2018	(Slovenia) Primož Roglič	(Colombia) Rigoberto Urán	(Slovenia) Matej Mohorič
↓ UCI Europe Tour (2.HC race) ↓
2019	(Italy) Diego Ulissi	(Italy) Giovanni Visconti	(Russia) Aleksandr Vlasov
↓ UCI Europe Tour ↓ ↓ UCI ProSeries ↓
2020	cancelled due to the COVID-19 pandemic in Slovenia		
2021	(Slovenia) Tadej Pogačar	(Italy) Diego Ulissi	(Italy) Matteo Sobrero
↓ UCI ProSeries ↓
2022	(Slovenia) Tadej Pogačar	(Poland) Rafał Majka	(Slovenia) Domen Novak
2023	(Italy) Filippo Zana	(Slovenia) Matej Mohorič	(Italy) Diego Ulissi
2024	(Italy) Giovanni Aleotti	(Spain) Pello Bilbao	(Italy) Giulio Pellizzari
2025	(Norway) A. Halland Johannessen	(Austria) Felix Großschartner	(United Kingdom) Tao Geoghegan Hart
2026	(Germany) Florian Lipowitz	(Italy) Giulio Pellizzari	(Slovenia) Jakob Omrzel

== Classifications ==
=== Current jersey colors ===
General	Points	Mountains	Young rider

=== List of all jersey winners by years ===
Jersey colors changed many times over the years. There were also Best Slovenian (1993) and Delo's sprints (1996) classifications.

	General	Points	Mountains	Young rider	Team	Intermediate sprints
Year						
1993	Boris Premužič	Boštjan Mervar	Gianluca Pianegonda	Gorazd Štangelj	Slovenia 1	Boštjan Mervar
1994	Tobias Steinhauser	Tobias Steinhauser	Tobias Steinhauser	Branko Filip	Slovenia	Jens Lehmann
1995	Valter Bonča	Luca Pavanello	Marco Di Renzo	Sergej Autko	Italy	Frank Høj
Year						
1996	Lorenzo Di Silvestro	Lorenzo Di Silvestro	Alexander Vinokourov	Tadej Valjavec	Cantina Tollo–Co.Bo.	Alexander Vinokourov
Year						
1998	Branko Filip	Andrej Hauptman	Igor Kranjec	Mitja Mahorič	Krka Telekom	Igor Kranjec
Year						
1999	Timothy Jones	Gabriele Balducci	Martin Derganc	Tadej Valjavec	Krka Telekom	Martin Derganc
Year						
2000	Martin Derganc	Mitja Mahorič	Mitja Mahorič	Matej Gnezda	Krka Telekom	Uroš Murn
2001	Faat Zakirov	Faat Zakirov	Matej Marin	Filippo Baldo	Amore & Vita-Beretta	Radoslav Rogina
2002	Evgeni Petrov	Evgeni Petrov	Dean Podgornik	Patrik Sinkewitz	Mapei–Quick-Step	Hannes Hempel
2003	Mitja Mahorič	Boštjan Mervar	Christian Heule	Aldo Ino Ilešič	Team Macandina	Andreas Matzbacher
2004	Mitja Mahorič	Matic Strgar	Matic Strgar	Matic Strgar	Krka Novo mesto	Jonas Ljungblad
Year						
2005	Przemysław Niemiec	Ruggero Marzoli	Przemysław Niemiec	Janez Brajkovič	Miche	not awarded
2006	Jure Golčer	Borut Božič	Matej Gnezda	Robert Kišerlovski	Adria Mobil	not awarded
2007	Tomaž Nose	Vincenzo Nibali	Gabriele Bosisio	Simon Špilak	Liquigas	not awarded
2008	Jure Golčer	Enrico Rossi	Mitja Mahorič	Robert Kišerlovski	Perutnina Ptuj	not awarded
2009	Jakob Fuglsang	Jakob Fuglsang	Jakob Fuglsang	Blaž Furdi	Team Saxo Bank	not awarded
2010	Vincenzo Nibali	Grega Bole	Stéphane Rossetto	Blaž Furdi	Team Saxo Bank	not awarded
2011	Diego Ulissi	Robert Vrečer	Diego Ulissi	Diego Ulissi	Loborika Favorit	not awarded
Year						
2012	Janez Brajkovič	Simone Ponzi	Preben Van Hecke	Jan Polanc	Loborika Favorit	not awarded
Year						
2013	Radoslav Rogina	Brett Lancaster	Radoslav Rogina	Jan Polanc	Adria Mobil	not awarded
Year						
2014	Tiago Machado	Michael Matthews	Klemen Štimulak	Simon Yates	Bardiani–CSF	not awarded
2015	Primož Roglič	Salvatore Puccio	Mauro Finetto	Domen Novak	Adria Mobil	not awarded
2016	Rein Taaramäe	Jack Haig	Jan Tratnik	Egan Bernal	Androni Giocattoli	not awarded
Year						
2017	Rafał Majka	Sam Bennett	Rafał Majka	Tadej Pogačar	Nippo–Vini Fantini	not awarded
2018	Primož Roglič	Simone Consonni	Fausto Masnada	Tadej Pogačar	Team Sunweb	not awarded
2019	Diego Ulissi	Luka Mezgec	Aleksandr Vlasov	Tadej Pogačar	UAE Team Emirates	not awarded
2021	Tadej Pogačar	Matej Mohorič	Tadej Pogačar	Kristjan Hočevar	UAE Team Emirates	not awarded
2022	Tadej Pogačar	Tadej Pogačar	Rafał Majka	Vojtěch Řepa	Caja Rural–Seguros	not awarded
2023	Filippo Zana	Ide Schelling	Samuele Zoccarato	Raúl García Pierna	Equipo Kern Pharma	not awarded
2024	Giovanni Aleotti	Giovanni Aleotti	Davide Baldaccini	Giulio Pellizzari	VF Group–Bardiani–CSF–Faizanè	not awarded
2025	Anders Halland Johannessen	Fabio Christen	Juan Pedro Lopez	Jakob Omrzel	VF Group–Bardiani–CSF–Faizanè	not awarded
Year						
2026	Florian Lipowitz	Laurence Pithie	Florian Lipowitz	Jakob Omrzel	Red Bull–Bora–Hansgrohe	not awarded
