= 2008 Tour of Slovenia =

UCI Europe Tour (2.1 race)

Race details
- Dates: 11–14 June 2008
- Stages: 4
- Distance: 620 km (385.3 mi)
- Winning time: 15h 06' 19"

Results
Jersey awarded to the overall winner	Winner	(Slovenia) Jure Golčer
	Second	(Italy) Franco Pellizotti
	Third	(Croatia) Robert Kišerlovski
Jersey awarded to the points classification winner	Points	(Italy) Enrico Rossi
Jersey awarded to the mountains classification winner	Mountains	(Slovenia) Mitja Mahorič
Jersey awarded to the youth classification winner	Youth	(Croatia) Robert Kišerlovski
	Team	(Slovenia) Perutnina Ptuj

The 2008 Tour of Slovenia (Slovene: Dirka po Sloveniji) was the 15th edition of the Tour of Slovenia, categorized as 2.1 stage race (UCI Europe Tour) held between 11 and 14 June 2008.

The race consisted of 4 stages with 620 km (385.3 mi) in total.

The original race was 650 km (403.9 mi) long, but the 3rd stage from Škofja Loka–Krvavec, had to be shortened due to bad weather for 30 km (18.6 mi), missed out Šenturska Gora–Kamnik round.

== Teams ==
Total 122 riders (87 finished it) from 16 teams started the race.

=== Pro Tour ===
- (Italy) Lampre
- (Italy) Liquigas

=== Pro Continental ===
- (Italy) Acqua & Sapone–Caffè Mokambo
- (Republic of Ireland) LPR Brakes–Ballan
- (Switzerland) NGC Medical–OTC Industria Porte
- (Austria) ELK Haus-Simplon
- (Czech Republic) PSK Whirlpool–Author
- (Venezuela) Diquigiovanni–Androni

=== Continental ===
- (Slovenia) Perutnina Ptuj
- (Slovenia) Sava
- (Slovenia) Adria Mobil
- (Slovenia) Radenska–KD Financial Point
- (San Marino) Miche–Silver Cross
- (San Marino) Nippo–Endeka
- (Serbia) Centri della Calzatura–Partizan

=== National ===
- Croatia

== Route and stages ==
Stage characteristics and winners
Stage	Date	Course	Length	Type		Winner
1	11 June	Ljubljana – Postojna	161 km (100 mi)	22x22_pik	Hilly stage	(Italy) Claudio Cucinotta
2	12 June	Piran – Koper	179 km (111 mi)	22x22_pik	Hilly stage	(Croatia) Radoslav Rogina
3	13 June	Škofja Loka – Krvavec	123 km (76 mi); ~~153 km (95 mi)~~	22x22_pik	Mountain stage	(Slovenia) Jure Golčer
4	14 June	Celje – Novo mesto	157 km (98 mi)	20x20_pik	Hilly stage	(Italy) Francesco Chicchi
Total		620 km (385.3 mi); ~~650 km (404 mi)~~				

== Classification leadership ==
Classification leadership by stage
Stage	Winner	General classification	Points classification	Mountains classification	Young rider classification	Team classification
1	Claudio Cucinotta	Claudio Cucinotta	Claudio Cucinotta	Kristjan Fajt	Björn Thurau	NGC Medical–OTC Industria Porte
2	Radoslav Rogina	Claudio Cucinotta	Claudio Cucinotta	Mitja Mahorič	Björn Thurau	Perutnina Ptuj
3	Jure Golčer	Jure Golčer	Enrico Rossi	Jure Golčer	Robert Kišerlovski	Perutnina Ptuj
4	Francesco Chicchi	Jure Golčer	Enrico Rossi	Jure Golčer	Robert Kišerlovski	Perutnina Ptuj
Final		Jure Golčer	Enrico Rossi	Mitja Mahorič	Robert Kišerlovski	Perutnina Ptuj

== Final classification standings ==
Legend
Denotes the leader of the general classification	Denotes the leader of the mountains classification
Denotes the leader of the points classification	Denotes the leader of the young rider classification
Denotes the leader of the team classification	

=== General classification ===
Rank	Rider	Team	Time
1	(Slovenia) Jure Golčer	LPR Brakes	15h 06' 19"
2	(Italy) Franco Pellizotti	Liquigas	+ 13"
3	(Croatia) Robert Kišerlovski	Adria Mobil	+ 29"
4	(Croatia) Radoslav Rogina	Perutnina Ptuj	+ 43"
5	(Slovenia) Simon Špilak	Lampre	+ 51"
6	(Poland) Przemysław Niemiec	Miche	+ 1' 00"
7	(Slovenia) Grega Bole	Adria Mobil	+ 1' 06"
8	(Croatia) Matija Kvasina	Perutnina Ptuj	+ 1' 10"
9	(Italy) Luca Zanasca	Calzatura Partizan	+ 1' 37"
10	(Ukraine) Ruslan Podgornij	LPR Brakes	+ 1' 46"

=== Points classification ===
Rank	Rider	Team	Points
1	(Italy) Enrico Rossi	Medical - OTC	54
2	(Italy) Francesco Chicchi	Liquigas	39
3	(Croatia) Radoslav Rogina	Perutnina Ptuj	37
4	(Slovenia) Jure Kocjan	Perutnina Ptuj	30
5	(Italy) Claudio Cucinotta	LPR Brakes	27
6	(Italy) Simone Cadamuro	Nippo-Endeka	27
7	(Slovenia) Jure Golčer	LPR Brakes	25
8	(Slovenia) Mitja Mahorič	Perutnina Ptuj	24
9	(Italy) Alberto Curtolo	Liquigas	21
10	(Italy) Franco Pellizotti	Liquigas	20

=== Mountains classification ===
Rank	Rider	Team	Points
1	(Slovenia) Mitja Mahorič	Perutnina Ptuj	15
2	(Slovenia) Jure Golčer	LPR Brakes	12
3	(Slovenia) Kristjan Fajt	Perutnina Ptuj	9
4	(Italy) Franco Pellizotti	Liquigas	8
5	(Croatia) Robert Kišerlovski	Adria Mobil	6

=== Young rider classification ===
Rank	Rider	Team	Time
1	(Croatia) Robert Kišerlovski	Adria Mobil	15h 06' 48"
2	(Slovenia) Simon Špilak	Lampre	+ 22"
3	(Slovenia) Blaž Furdi	Sava	+ 3' 22"
4	(Slovenia) Andi Bajc	Radenska KD FT	+ 4' 55"
5	(Czech Republic) Jakub Danačík	PSK Whirlpool	+ 9' 38"

=== Team classification ===
Rank	Team	Time
1	(Slovenia) Perutnina Ptuj	45h 23′ 00″
2	(San Marino) Miche	+ 2′ 38″
3	(Italy) Liquigas	+ 2′ 43″
4	(Slovenia) Radenska KD FT	+ 5′ 54″
5	(Austria) Elk Haus - Simplon	+ 6′ 09″
6	(Slovenia) Adria Mobil	+ 7′ 04″
7	(Serbia) Calzatura-Partizan	+ 7′ 13″
8	(Czech Republic) PSK Whirlpool	+ 9′ 32″
9	(Slovenia) Sava	+ 13′ 09″
10	(Republic of Ireland) LPR Brakes	+ 15′ 51″
