= 2013 Tour of Slovenia =

UCI Europe Tour (2.1 race)

Race details
- Dates: 13–16 June 2013
- Stages: 4
- Distance: 503.1 km (312.6 mi)
- Winning time: 13h 05' 56"

Results
Jersey awarded to the overall winner	Winner	(Croatia) Radoslav Rogina
	Second	(Slovenia) Jan Polanc
	Third	(Germany) Patrik Sinkewitz
Jersey awarded to the points classification winner	Points	(Australia) Brett Lancaster
Jersey awarded to the mountains classification winner	Mountains	(Croatia) Radoslav Rogina
Jersey awarded to the youth classification winner	Youth	(Slovenia) Jan Polanc
	Team	(Slovenia) Adria Mobil

The 2013 Tour of Slovenia (Slovene: Dirka po Sloveniji) was the 20th edition of the Tour of Slovenia, categorized as 2.1 stage race (UCI Europe Tour) held between 13 and 16 June 2013.

Yellow jersey for overall classification returned after 2 years (replacing temporary blue jersey).

The race consisted of 4 stages with 503.1 km (312.6 mi) in total.

== Teams ==
Total 117 riders (99 finished it) from 15 teams started the race.

=== UCI ProTeams ===
- (Italy) Vini Fantini–Selle Italia
- (Italy) Bardiani Valvole–CSF Inox
- (Belgium) Topsport Vlaanderen–Baloise
- (Italy) Lampre–Merida
- (Italy) Androni Giocattoli–Venezuela
- (Australia) Orica–GreenEDGE

=== UCI Professional Continental ===
- (Italy) Colombia
- (Russia) RusVelo

=== UCI Continental ===
- (Russia) Lokosphinx
- (Slovenia) Adria Mobil
- (Croatia) Meridiana–Kamen
- (Slovenia) Sava
- (Austria) Tirol Cycling Team
- (Kazakhstan) Continental Team Astana
- (Slovenia) Radenska

== Route and stages ==
Stage characteristics and winners
Stage	Date	Course	Length	Type	Winner
1	13 June	Ljubljana – Ljubljana	8.8 km (5 mi)	Individual time trial	(Canada) Svein Tuft
2	14 June	Kočevje – Višnja Gora	168.5 km (105 mi)		(Italy) Fabio Felline
3	15 June	Škofja Loka – Vršič	170 km (106 mi)	Mountain stage	(Croatia) Radoslav Rogina
4	16 June	Brežice – Novo mesto	155.8 km (97 mi)		(Australia) Brett Lancaster
Total		503.1 km (312.6 mi)			

== Classification leadership ==
Classification leadership by stage
Stage	Winner	General classification	Points classification	Mountains classification	Young rider classification	Team classification
1	Svein Tuft	Svein Tuft	Svein Tuft	not awarded	Kirill Sveshnikov	Orica–GreenEDGE
2	Fabio Felline	Fabio Felline	Fabio Felline	Dalivier Ospina	Jan Polanc	Androni Giocattoli–Venezuela
3	Radoslav Rogina	Radoslav Rogina	Radoslav Rogina	Radoslav Rogina	Jan Polanc	Adria Mobil
4	Brett Lancaster	Radoslav Rogina	Brett Lancaster	Radoslav Rogina	Jan Polanc	Adria Mobil
Final		Radoslav Rogina	Brett Lancaster	Radoslav Rogina	Jan Polanc	Adria Mobil

== Final classification standings ==
Legend
Denotes the leader of the general classification	Denotes the leader of the mountains classification
Denotes the leader of the points classification	Denotes the leader of the young rider classification
Denotes the leader of the team classification	

=== General classification ===
Rank	Rider	Team	Time
1	(Croatia) Radoslav Rogina	Adria Mobil	13h 05' 56"
2	(Slovenia) Jan Polanc	Radenska	+ 19"
3	(Germany) Patrik Sinkewitz	Meridiana–Kamen	+ 37"
4	(Slovenia) Tadej Valjavec	Sava	+ 01' 05"
5	(Italy) Angelo Pagani	Bardiani Valvole–CSF Inox	+ 01' 56"
6	(Colombia) Darwin Atapuma	Colombia	+ 02' 15"
7	(Slovenia) Jure Golčer	Tirol Cycling Team	+ 03' 02"
8	(Italy) Enrico Barbin	Bardiani Valvole–CSF Inox	+ 03' 22"
9	(Kazakhstan) Tilegen Maidos	Continental Team Astana	+ 03' 51"
10	(Russia) Alexander Rybakov	RusVelo	+ 03' 55"

=== Points classification ===
Rank	Rider	Team	Points
1	(Australia) Brett Lancaster	Orica–GreenEDGE	45
2	(Croatia) Radoslav Rogina	Adria Mobil	41
3	(Slovenia) Jan Polanc	Radenska	31
4	(Italy) Fabio Felline	Androni Giocattoli–Venezuela	31
5	(Italy) Enrico Barbin	Bardiani Valvole–CSF Inox	30
6	(Colombia) Darwin Atapuma	Colombia	28
7	(Argentina) Maximiliano Richeze	Lampre–Merida	28
8	(Canada) Svein Tuft	Orica–GreenEDGE	25
9	(Slovenia) Tadej Valjavec	Sava	22
10	(Australia) Wesley Sulzberger	Orica–GreenEDGE	20

=== Mountains classification ===
Rank	Rider	Team	Points
1	(Croatia) Radoslav Rogina	Adria Mobil	15
2	(Colombia) Dalivier Ospina	Colombia	12
3	(Slovenia) Primož Roglič	Adria Mobil	12
4	(Belgium) Laurens De Vreese	Topsport Vlaanderen–Baloise	9
5	(Germany) Patrik Sinkewitz	Meridiana–Kamen	9
6	(Italy) Antonino Parrinello	Androni Giocattoli–Venezuela	8
7	(Slovenia) Jan Polanc	Radenska	8
8	(Italy) Matteo Di Serafino	Androni Giocattoli–Venezuela	6
9	(Australia) Wesley Sulzberger	Orica–GreenEDGE	6
10	(Slovenia) Matej Mugerli	Adria Mobil	6

=== Young rider classification ===
Rank	Rider	Team	Time
1	(Slovenia) Jan Polanc	Radenska	13h 06' 15"
2	(Kazakhstan) Tilegen Maidos	Continental Team Astana	+ 03' 32"
3	(Slovenia) Matej Mohorič	Sava	+ 13' 59"
4	(Slovenia) Luka Pibernik	Radenska	+ 30' 04"
5	(Slovenia) Jaka Boštner	Radenska	+ 30' 28"
6	(Slovenia) Jure Bitenc	Sava	+ 32' 31"
7	(Austria) Martin Weiss	Tirol Cycling Team	+ 35' 37"
8	(Slovenia) Mark Džamastagič	Sava	+ 36' 50"
9	(Slovenia) Tim Mikelj	Sava	+ 37' 25"
10	(Slovenia) Marko Pavlič	Radenska	+ 39' 05"

=== Team classification ===
Rank	Team	Time
1	(Slovenia) Adria Mobil	39h 26' 56"
2	(Italy) Bardiani Valvole–CSF Inox	+ 13' 08"
3	(Austria) Tirol Cycling Team	+ 16' 21"
4	(Belgium) Topsport Vlaanderen–Baloise	+ 16' 28"
5	(Kazakhstan) Continental Team Astana	+ 17' 26"
6	(Italy) Colombia	+ 18' 32"
7	(Russia) RusVelo	+ 21' 36"
8	(Italy) Androni Giocattoli–Venezuela	+ 27' 55"
9	(Italy) Vini Fantini–Selle Italia	+ 30' 42"
10	(Slovenia) Sava	+ 31' 18"
