= Aldo Ino Ilešič =

Slovenian cyclist

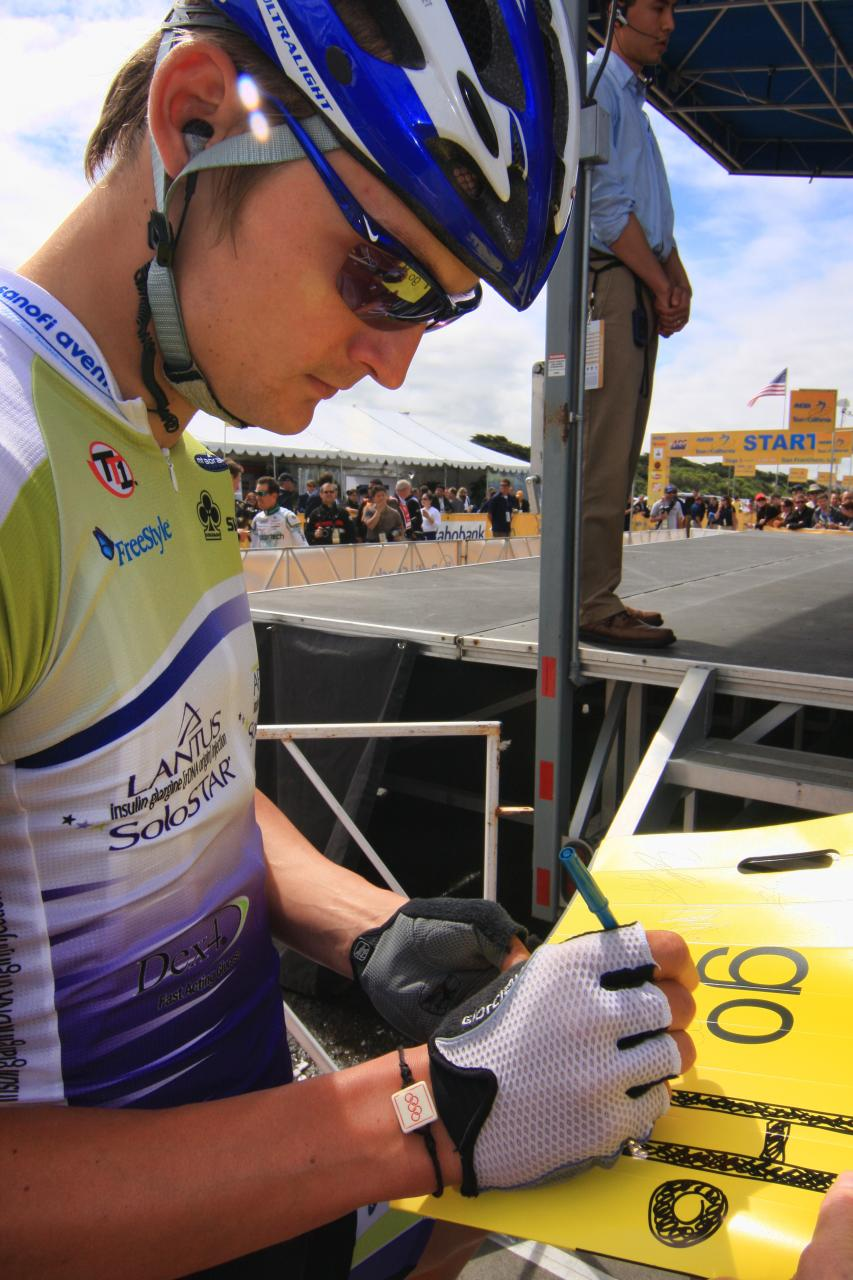

Personal information
- Full name: Aldo Ino Ilešič
- Born: September 1, 1984 (age 42) Ptuj

Cycling career
- Sport: Cycling
- Discipline: Road
- Role: Rider
- Rider type: Sprinter

Professional teams
- 2004–2007: Perutnina Ptuj
- 2008: Sava
- 2009–2012: Team Type 1
- 2013–2014: UnitedHealthcare
- 2015: Team Vorarlberg
- 2016: Astellas

Aldo Ino Ilešič (born 1 September 1984 in Ptuj) is a Slovenian cyclist who last rode for UCI Continental team Astellas.

== Major results ==
2003
Tour of Slovenia

1st Points classification
1st Stage 3

2004
1st Stage 6 Olympia's Tour
2005
1st Stage 1b (TTT) The Paths of King Nikola
4th Poreč Trophy
2006
1st Stage 5a Giro delle Regioni
1st Stage 4 Course de la Solidarité Olympique
5th Poreč Trophy
2007
4th Poreč Trophy
2008
1st Poreč Trophy
1st Banja Luka–Belgrade I
3rd GP Kranj
4th Banja Luka–Belgrade II
2010
Tour du Maroc

1st Stages 3, 7 & 10

1st Stage 1 Vuelta Mexico Telmex
Tour do Rio

1st Stages 4 & 5

2012
1st Stage 7 Tour of Qinghai Lake
1st Stage 4 Tour do Rio
2nd Philadelphia International Championship
6th Overall Tour of China I

1st Stage 3

2013
1st Clarendon Cup
2015
10th Trofej Umag
2016
2nd Overall Red Hook Crit Series
2017
9th Overall Red Hook Crit Series

1st Last-Chance-Race Barcelona No. 5
3rd Brooklyn No. 10
5th Milan No. 8
