= Timothy Jones (cyclist) =

Zimbabwean cyclist (born 1975)

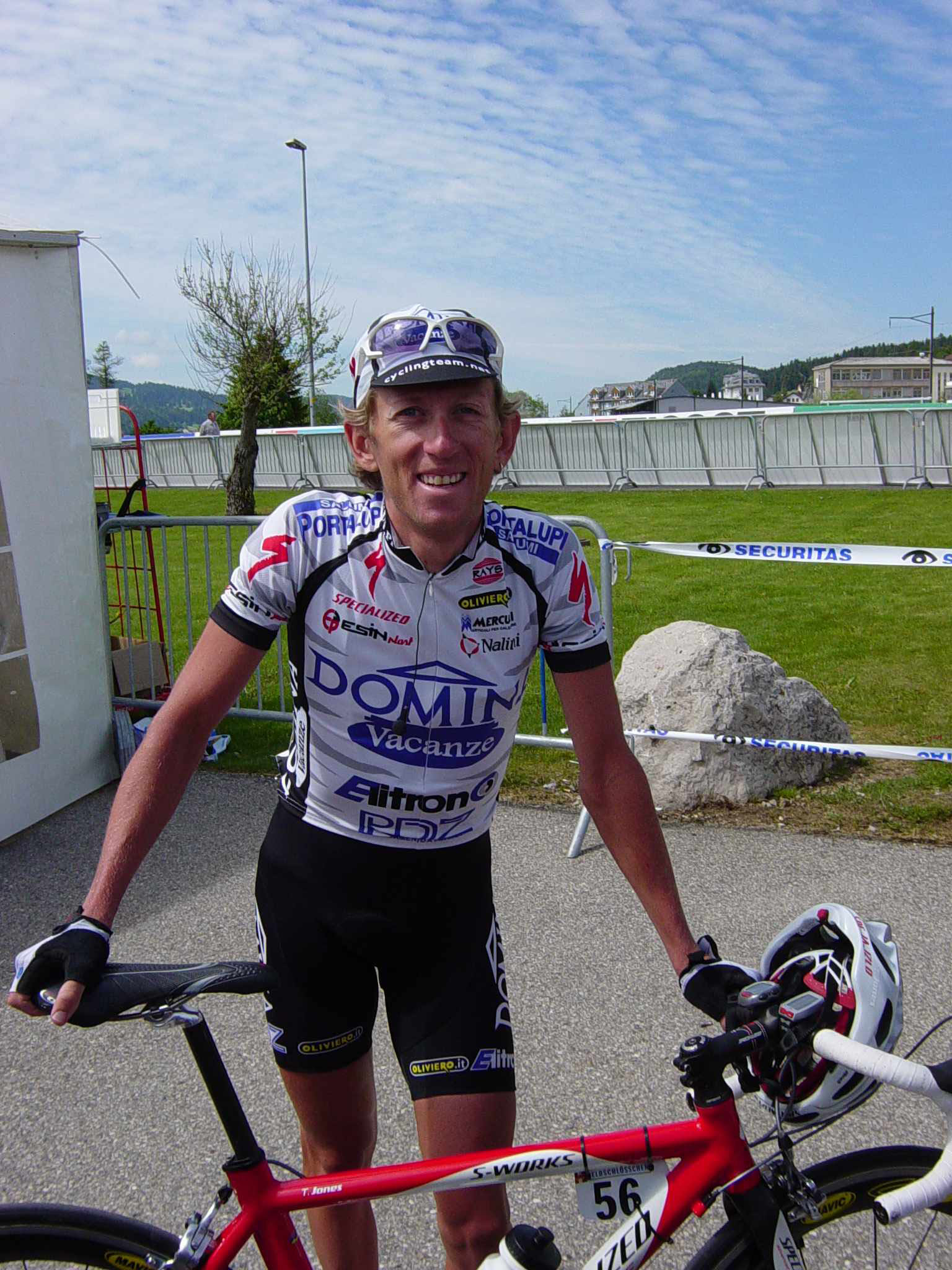
- Timothy Jones in 2004

Personal information
- Full name: Timothy Jones
- Born: 1 August 1975 (age 51) Salisbury, Rhodesia (now Harare, Zimbabwe)

Cycling career
- Sport: Cycling
- Discipline: Road
- Role: Rider

Professional teams
- 1997–1999: Amore & Vita–ForzArcore
- 2000–2002: Mobilvetta Design–Rossin
- 2002: Mercury Cycling Team
- 2003: Amore & Vita–Beretta
- 2003–2004: Domina Vacanze–Elitron
- 2005: Tenax–Nobili Rubinetterie
- 2006–2007: Amore & Vita–McDonald's

Timothy David Jones (born 1 August 1975 in Harare) is a Zimbabwean former professional road racing cyclist. He raced in Europe for ten years, riding for Amore & Vita–ForzArcore, Mobilvetta Design–Rossin, Mercury, Domina Vacanze–Elitron and Tenax–Nobili Rubinetterie professional cycling teams.

His most notable victories are stage 3 of the 2003 Settimana Ciclista Lombarda, Tour of Slovenia (1999), Giro del Capo (1998) in South Africa and the 2001 Giro dell'Etna in Italy where he beat Davide Rebellin and Ivan Basso. He is the first Zimbabwean to compete in a Grand Tour, finishing 73rd in the 2001 Giro d'Italia. Jones brother, Nathan represented Zimbabwe at the 1991 Cycling Junior World Championships that were held in Colorado. His youngest brother Adam is a notable publisher and editor of Wealth Magazine in Botswana. He is also the ex-brother-in-law of Italian cyclists Antonio and Ivan Fanelli.

== Major results ==
1998
1st Time trial, National Road Championships
1st Overall Giro del Capo

1st Stage 4

8th Overall Tour de l'Ain
10th Overall Vuelta a Asturias
1999
1st Overall Tour of Slovenia

1st Stage 5

3rd Overall Uniqa Classic
7th Overall Giro del Trentino
2001
1st Giro dell'Etna
1st Stage 3 Settimana Ciclistica Lombarda
2003
2nd Overall Settimana Ciclistica Lombarda

1st Stage 3

3rd Gran Premio Industria e Commercio Artigianato Carnaghese
6th Overall Tour of Slovenia
7th Overall Giro della Liguria
7th Gran Premio de Llodio
9th Overall Giro d'Abruzzo
2004
2nd Overall Settimana Ciclistica Lombarda
4th Overall Giro d'Abruzzo
8th Overall Settimana Internazionale di Coppi e Bartali
2006
2nd Overall Circuito Montañés
2007
1st Maratona dles Dolomites

== See also ==
- Zimbabwe Cycling Federation
