= Martin Derganc =

Slovenian cyclist

Personal information
- Born: March 20, 1977 (age 49) Novo Mesto, Slovenia

Cycling career
- Sport: Cycling
- Current team: Retired
- Discipline: Road
- Role: Rider

Professional teams
- 2000–2001: KRKA–Telekom Slovenije
- 2002: Acqua & Sapone
- 2003–2005: Domina Vacanze–Elitron

Martin Derganc (born 20 March 1977 in Novo Mesto) is a Slovenian former professional road cyclist.

== Career achievements ==
=== Major results ===
1997
1st Krka Grand Prix
1999
1st Coppa della Pace
2000
1st Overall Tour de Slovénie
1st Overall Tour of Croatia

1st Stage 2

1st Krka Grand Prix
4th Time trial, National Road Championships
2001
1st Road race, National Road Championships
2nd Overall Tour de Slovénie
3rd Vlaamse Havenpijl
7th Rund um Düren
9th Overall Brixia Tour
9th Overall Tour of Austria
10th Tre Valli Varesine
2002
1st Stage 4 Tour of Austria
2003
1st Overall Brixia Tour

1st Stage 2

=== Grand Tour general classification results timeline ===
Grand Tour	2002	2003	2004
Giro d'Italia	126	—	95
Tour de France	—	—	—
Vuelta a España	DNF	—	—

Legend
DSQ	Disqualified
DNF	Did not finish
