= Valter Bonča =

Slovenian cyclist

Personal information
- Born: 17 March 1968 (age 58) Ljubljana, Yugoslavia

Cycling career
- Sport: Cycling
- Current team: Tirol KTM Cycling Team
- Discipline: Road
- Role: Rider (retired); Team manager; Directeur sportif

Amateur team
- 1992: Jolly Componibili–Club 88 (stagiaire)

Professional teams
- 1993: Jolly Componibili–Club 88
- 1994: Amore & Vita–Galatron
- 1995: ZG Mobili–Selle Italia
- 1996: Glacial–Selle Italia
- 1999: Mróz
- 2000: Bosch Hausgeräte-Sport Kärnten-Junkers
- 2001–2004: KRKA–Telekom Slovenije
- 2005–2006: Sava

Managerial teams
- 2009–2010: Motomat–Delo Revije
- 2015: Tirol Cycling Team
- 2017: Tirol Cycling Team
- 2019–: Tirol KTM Cycling Team

Valter Bonča (born 17 March 1968) is a Slovenian former racing cyclist, who currently works as a directeur sportif for UCI Continental team Tirol KTM Cycling Team. He competed at the 1988 Summer Olympics, representing Yugoslavia, and at the 1992 Summer Olympics, representing Slovenia.

== Major results ==
1989
1st Overall Tour of Austria
1990
2nd Overall Vienna-Rabenstein-Gresten-Vienne
1991
2nd Overall Vienna-Rabenstein-Gresten-Vienne
1992
1st Overall Tour of Austria
1995
1st Overall Tour of Slovenia
1998
1st Stage 3 Tour of Slovenia
2000
National Road Championships

1st Time trial
2nd Road race

1st Stage 3 Tour of Rhodes
2nd Overall Sachsen Tour

1st Stage 5a

3rd Overall Tour de Bohemia

1st Stage 4

2002
3rd Jadranska Magistrala
2003
National Road Championships

2nd Road race
2nd Time trial

2004
2nd Overall FBD Insurance Rás

1st Stage 1

2nd Giro d'Abruzzo
2005
2nd Time trial, National Road Championships
3rd Overall Paths of King Nikola

=== Grand Tour general classification results timeline ===
Grand Tour	1993	1994
Giro d'Italia	35	DNF
Tour de France	—	—
Vuelta a España	—	—

Legend
DNF	Did not finish
