= Tomaž Nose =

Slovenian cyclist

Personal information
- Full name: Tomaž Nose
- Born: April 21, 1982 (age 44)

Cycling career
- Sport: Cycling
- Discipline: Road
- Role: Rider

Amateur teams
- 2001: KRKA–Telekom Slovenije (stagiaire)
- 2002: Perutnina Ptuj–KRKA–Telekom Slovenije (stagiaire)
- 2003: KRKA–Telekom

Professional teams
- 2004–2005: Phonak
- 2006–2014: Adria Mobil

Major wins
- Giro della Valle d'Aosta (2004); Tour of Slovenia (2007)

Tomaž Nose (born 21 April 1982) is a Slovenian retired racing cyclist.

== Major results ==
2000
5th Road race, UCI Road World Championships
2002
2nd Overall GP Kranj
4th Overall Istrian Spring Trophy
5th Road race, UEC European Under-23 Road Championships
5th Trofeo Zsšdi
2003
2nd Overall GP Tell

1st Stage 2

3rd Giro del Belvedere
3rd Overall Giro delle Regioni
9th Overall Istrian Spring Trophy
2004
1st Overall GP Tell

1st Stage 2

1st GP Palio del Recioto
1st Stage 6 Tour de Slovénie
2nd Giro del Belvedere
7th Trofeo Piva
2006
1st Overall Tour de Slovénie

1st Stages 2 & 3

2nd Road race, National Road Championships
10th Overall Giro del Trentino
2007
1st Overall Tour de Slovénie
2nd Road race, National Road Championships
8th Overall Brixia Tour
2009
2nd Overall Tour de Slovénie
6th GP Industria & Artigianato
2010
6th GP Industria & Artigianato
2011
6th Memoriał Henryka Łasaka
2012
3rd GP Nobili Rubinetterie
6th Trofeo Zsšdi
9th Overall Tour de Slovénie
2013
3rd Classic Beograd–Cacak
6th Raiffeisen Grand Prix
8th Overall Settimana Ciclistica Lombarda
