= 2015 Tour de Hongrie =

2015 UCI Europe Tour

Race details
- Dates: 4–9 August
- Stages: 5 + Prologue
- Distance: 702 km (436 mi)
- Winning time: 15hr 31' 02"

Results
| Jersey awarded to the overall winner | Winner | Tom Thill (LUX) | (Differdange–Losch) |
| | Second | Andi Bajc (SLO) | (Amplatz-BMC) |
| | Third | James Early (NZL) | (Team Stölting) |
| Jersey awarded to the points classification winner | Points | Jan Tratnik (SLO) | (Amplatz-BMC) |
| Jersey awarded to the mountains classification winner | Mountains | Marius Hafsås (NOR) | (Team Fixit.no) |
| Jersey awarded to the young rider classification winner | Young rider | Moritz Backofen (GER) | (Team Stölting) |
| | Team | Amplatz-BMC | |

The 2015 Tour de Hongrie was a six-day cycling stage race that took place in Hungary in August 2015. The race is the 36th edition of the Tour de Hongrie. It was rated as a 2.2 event as part of the 2015 UCI Europe Tour. The race included five stages+Prologue, starting in Szombathely on 4 August and returning there for the finish on 9 August in Budapest.

== Schedule ==
Stage characteristics and winners
| Stage | Date | Course | Distance | Type | Winner |
|---|---|---|---|---|---|
| P | 4 August | Szombathely | 1.2 km (0.7 mi) | Individual time trial | Manuel Porzner (GER) |
| 1 | 5 August | Szombathely to Keszthely | 112 km (70 mi) | Plain stage | Maroš Kováč (SVK) |
| 2 | 6 August | Balatonföldvár to Kecskemét | 200 km (124 mi) | Plain stage | Marek Čanecký (SVK) |
| 3 | 7 August | Abony to Karcag | 136 km (85 mi) | Plain stage | Manuel Porzner (GER) |
| 4 | 8 August | Karcag to Gyöngyös (Kékestető) | 146 km (91 mi) | Intermediate stage | Andi Bajc (SLO) |
| 5 | 9 August | Gyöngyös to Budapest | 105 km (65 mi) | Plain stage | Jan Tratnik (SLO) |
| Total | | | 700.2 km (435 mi) | | |

== Participating teams ==
16 teams were invited to the 2015 Tour de Hongrie: and 6 UCI Continental, 4 Regional, 1 national (Serbia) and 5 Hungarian teams.

Riders of 21 different nationalities participated, the largest numbers being from Hungary (32), Izrael, the Netherlands Norway, Serbia and Slovakia (6), Czech Republic and Germany (5), Spain (3), France, Luxembourg, Slovenia, Ukraine and United States (2), with Belgium, Colombia, Guatemala, Italy, Latvia, Lithuania and New Zealand all having 1.

The teams entering the race were:

Participating teams

- Amplatz-BMC
- Differdange-Losch
- Utensilnord
- Mugenrace Prolog
- DKSI
- Veloki Team
- Cube-Csömör
- Kemo Dukla Trencin
- Start-Massi
- Team Stölting
- Serbia (national team)
- Team Fixit.no
- Forman Cinelli
- West-Frisia
- Equipe CMI
- For Galilee Cycles

== Stages ==
=== Prologue ===
4 August 2015 — Szombathely, 1.2 km (0.7 mi), individual time trial (ITT)

Prologue and General Classification Result

| | Rider | Team | Time |
|---|---|---|---|
| 1 | Manuel Porzner (GER) | Team Stölting | 1' 10" |
| 2 | Henrik Sandal (NOR) | Team Fixit.no | + 2" |
| 3 | Ole Quast (GER) | Team Stölting | + 3" |
| 4 | Marek Čanecký (SVK) | Amplatz-BMC | + 3" |
| 5 | Patrik Tybor (SVK) | Kemo–Dukla Trenčín | + 3" |
| 6 | Moritz Backofen (GER) | Team Stölting | + 3" |
| 7 | Jan Tratnik (SLO) | Amplatz-BMC | + 3" |
| 8 | Péter Kusztor (HUN) | Amplatz-BMC | + 3" |
| 9 | Marius Hafsås (NOR) | Team Fixit.no | + 3" |
| 10 | Filip Eidsheim (NOR) | Team Fixit.no | + 4" |

=== Stage 1 ===
5 August 2015 — Szombathely to Keszthely, 112 km (69.6 mi)

Stage 1 Result

| | Rider | Team | Time |
|---|---|---|---|
| 1 | Maroš Kováč (SVK) | Kemo–Dukla Trenčín | 2h 19' 26" |
| 2 | Janis Dakteris (LAT) | Differdange–Losch | + 10" |
| 3 | Patrik Tybor (SVK) | Kemo–Dukla Trenčín | + 14" |
| 4 | Ivan Stević (SRB) | Serbia | + 26" |
| 5 | Oostra Folkert (NED) | West-Frisia | + 28" |
| 6 | Péter Kusztor (HUN) | Amplatz-BMC | + 33" |
| 7 | Jan Tratnik (SLO) | Amplatz-BMC | + 1' 21" |
| 8 | Filip Eidsheim (NOR) | Team Fixit.no | + 1' 21" |
| 9 | Manuel Porzner (GER) | Team Stölting | + 1' 21" |
| 10 | Krisztián Lovassy (HUN) | Differdange–Losch | + 1' 21" |

General Classification after Stage 1

| | Rider | Team | Time |
|---|---|---|---|
| 1 | Maroš Kováč (SVK) | Kemo–Dukla Trenčín | 2h 20' 40" |
| 2 | Janis Dakteris (LAT) | Differdange–Losch | + 12" |
| 3 | Patrik Tybor (SVK) | Kemo–Dukla Trenčín | + 13" |
| 4 | Ivan Stević (SRB) | Serbia | + 27" |
| 5 | Oostra Folkert (NED) | West-Frisia | + 32" |
| 6 | Péter Kusztor (HUN) | Amplatz-BMC | + 33" |
| 7 | Manuel Porzner (GER) | Team Stölting | + 1' 17" |
| 8 | Henrik Sandal (NOR) | Team Fixit.no | + 1' 20" |
| 9 | Jan Tratnik (SLO) | Amplatz-BMC | + 1' 21" |
| 10 | Filip Eidsheim (NOR) | Team Fixit.no | + 1' 21" |

=== Stage 2 ===
6 August 2015 — Balatonföldvár to Kecskemét, 200 km (124.3 mi)

Stage 2 Result

| | Rider | Team | Time |
|---|---|---|---|
| 1 | Marek Čanecký (SVK) | Amplatz-BMC | 3h 54' 49" |
| 2 | Tom Thill (LUX) | Differdange–Losch | s.t. |
| 3 | Maximilian Kuen (AUT) | Amplatz-BMC | + 11" |
| 4 | Andi Bajc (SLO) | Amplatz-BMC | + 55" |
| 5 | James Early (NZL) | Team Stölting | + 57" |
| 6 | Adrian Gjølberg (NOR) | Team Fixit.no | + 2' 05" |
| 7 | Johan Coenen (BEL) | Differdange–Losch | + 2' 05" |
| 8 | Stefan Stefanović (SRB) | Serbia | + 2' 13" |
| 9 | Sjors Dekker (NED) | West-Frisia | + 2' 15" |
| 10 | Marc Vilanova (ESP) | Start-Massi | + 2' 56" |

General Classification after Stage 2

| | Rider | Team | Time |
|---|---|---|---|
| 1 | Marek Čanecký (SVK) | Amplatz-BMC | 6h 16' 45" |
| 2 | Tom Thill (LUX) | Differdange–Losch | + 7" |
| 3 | Maximilian Kuen (AUT) | Amplatz-BMC | + 19" |
| 4 | Andi Bajc (SLO) | Amplatz-BMC | + 1' 08" |
| 5 | James Early (NZL) | Team Stölting | + 1' 10" |
| 6 | Maroš Kováč (SVK) | Kemo–Dukla Trenčín | + 2' 08" |
| 7 | Johan Coenen (BEL) | Differdange–Losch | + 2' 18" |
| 8 | Janis Dakteris (LAT) | Differdange–Losch | + 2' 21" |
| 9 | Patrik Tybor (SVK) | Kemo–Dukla Trenčín | + 2' 24" |
| 10 | Sjors Dekker (NED) | West-Frisia | + 2' 27" |

=== Stage 3 ===
7 August 2015 — Abony to Karcag, 136 km (84.5 mi)

Stage 3 Result

| | Rider | Team | Time |
|---|---|---|---|
| 1 | Manuel Porzner (GER) | Team Stölting | 3h 18' 03" |
| 2 | Filip Eidsheim (NOR) | Team Fixit.no | s.t. |
| 3 | Joris de Boer (NED) | West-Frisia | s.t. |
| 4 | Gediminas Kaupas (LTU) | Differdange–Losch | s.t. |
| 5 | Ivan Stević (SRB) | Serbia | s.t. |
| 6 | Jan Tratnik (SLO) | Amplatz-BMC | s.t. |
| 7 | Zsolt Dér (HUN) | Start-Massi | s.t. |
| 8 | Norbert Ábrók (HUN) | DKSI | s.t. |
| 9 | Janis Dakteris (LAT) | Differdange–Losch | s.t. |
| 10 | Balázs Rózsa (HUN) | Utensilnord | s.t. |

General Classification after Stage 3

| | Rider | Team | Time |
|---|---|---|---|
| 1 | Marek Čanecký (SVK) | Amplatz-BMC | 9h 34' 49" |
| 2 | Tom Thill (LUX) | Differdange–Losch | + 6" |
| 3 | Maximilian Kuen (AUT) | Amplatz-BMC | + 18" |
| 4 | Andi Bajc (SLO) | Amplatz-BMC | + 1' 08" |
| 5 | James Early (NZL) | Team Stölting | + 1' 09" |
| 6 | Oostra Folkert (NED) | West-Frisia | + 1' 31" |
| 7 | Maroš Kováč (SVK) | Kemo–Dukla Trenčín | + 2' 04" |
| 8 | Janis Dakteris (LAT) | Differdange–Losch | + 2' 16" |
| 9 | Patrik Tybor (SVK) | Kemo–Dukla Trenčín | + 2' 17" |
| 10 | Johan Coenen (BEL) | Differdange–Losch | + 2' 17" |

=== Stage 4 ===
8 August 2015 — Karcag to Kékestető, 146 km (90.7 mi)

Stage 4 Result

| | Rider | Team | Time |
|---|---|---|---|
| 1 | Andi Bajc (SLO) | Amplatz-BMC | 3h 33' 46" |
| 2 | Patrik Tybor (SVK) | Kemo–Dukla Trenčín | + 2" |
| 3 | Moritz Backofen (GER) | Team Stölting | + 7" |
| 4 | Tom Thill (LUX) | Differdange–Losch | + 11" |
| 5 | Krisztián Lovassy (HUN) | Differdange–Losch | + 31" |
| 6 | Zoltán Vígh (HUN) | Veloki Team | + 38" |
| 7 | Marko Stanković (SRB) | Serbia | + 45" |
| 8 | Axel Costa (ESP) | Start-Massi | + 51" |
| 9 | Marc Vilanova (ESP) | Start-Massi | + 57" |
| 10 | Adne van Engelen (NED) | West-Frisia | + 57" |

General Classification after Stage 4

| | Rider | Team | Time |
|---|---|---|---|
| 1 | Tom Thill (LUX) | Differdange–Losch | 13h 08' 51" |
| 2 | Andi Bajc (SLO) | Amplatz-BMC | + 50" |
| 3 | James Early (NZL) | Team Stölting | + 1' 51" |
| 4 | Patrik Tybor (SVK) | Kemo–Dukla Trenčín | + 2' 02" |
| 5 | Oostra Folkert (NED) | West-Frisia | + 2' 11" |
| 6 | Moritz Backofen (GER) | Team Stölting | + 3' 19" |
| 7 | Stefan Stefanović (SRB) | Serbia | + 3' 27" |
| 8 | Johan Coenen (BEL) | Differdange–Losch | + 3' 37" |
| 9 | Krisztián Lovassy (HUN) | Differdange–Losch | + 3' 39" |
| 10 | Péter Kusztor (HUN) | Amplatz-BMC | + 3' 49" |

=== Stage 5 ===
9 August 2015 — Gyöngyös to Budapest (Buda Castle), 105 km (65.2 mi)

Stage 5 Result

| | Rider | Team | Time |
|---|---|---|---|
| 1 | Jan Tratnik (SLO) | Amplatz-BMC | 2h 22' 00" |
| 2 | Andi Bajc (SLO) | Amplatz-BMC | + 11" |
| 3 | Krisztián Lovassy (HUN) | Differdange–Losch | + 11" |
| 4 | Ivan Stević (SRB) | Serbia | + 11" |
| 5 | Marek Čanecký (SVK) | Amplatz-BMC | + 11" |
| 6 | Manuel Porzner (GER) | Team Stölting | + 11" |
| 7 | Patrik Tybor (SVK) | Kemo–Dukla Trenčín | + 11" |
| 8 | Maximilian Kuen (AUT) | Amplatz-BMC | + 11" |
| 9 | Norbert Ábrók (HUN) | DKSI | + 11" |
| 10 | Henrik Sandal (NOR) | Team Fixit.no | + 11" |

Final General Classification

| | Rider | Team | Time |
|---|---|---|---|
| 1 | Tom Thill (LUX) | Differdange–Losch | 15h 31' 02" |
| 2 | Andi Bajc (SLO) | Amplatz-BMC | + 44" |
| 3 | James Early (NZL) | Team Stölting | + 1' 51" |
| 4 | Patrik Tybor (SVK) | Kemo–Dukla Trenčín | + 2' 02" |
| 5 | Oostra Folkert (NED) | West-Frisia | + 2' 11" |
| 6 | Moritz Backofen (GER) | Team Stölting | + 3' 19" |
| 7 | Stefan Stefanović (SRB) | Serbia | + 3' 27" |
| 8 | Krisztián Lovassy (HUN) | Differdange–Losch | + 3' 35" |
| 9 | Johan Coenen (BEL) | Differdange–Losch | + 3' 37" |
| 10 | Janis Dakteris (LAT) | Differdange–Losch | + 3' 52" |

== Classification leadership ==
Classification leadership by stage
| Stage | Winner | General classification | Points classification | Mountains classification | Young rider classification | Team classification |
|---|---|---|---|---|---|---|
| P | Manuel Porzner | Manuel Porzner | Ole Quast | Marek Čanecký | Manuel Porzner | Team Stölting |
| 1 | Maroš Kováč | Maroš Kováč | Maroš Kováč | Marius Hafsås | Manuel Porzner | Kemo–Dukla Trenčín |
| 2 | Marek Čanecký | Marek Čanecký | Marek Čanecký | Marius Hafsås | Sjors Dekker | Amplatz-BMC |
| 3 | Manuel Porzner | Marek Čanecký | Marek Čanecký | Marius Hafsås | Stefan Stefanović | Amplatz-BMC |
| 4 | Andi Bajc | Tom Thill | Marek Čanecký | Marius Hafsås | Moritz Backofen | Differdange–Losch |
| 5 | Jan Tratnik | Tom Thill | Jan Tratnik | Marius Hafsås | Moritz Backofen | Amplatz-BMC |
| Final | | Tom Thill | Jan Tratnik | Marius Hafsås | Moritz Backofen | Amplatz-BMC |

== Final standings ==
Legend
| Yellow jersey | Denotes the leader of the general classification | Green jersey | Denotes the leader of the points classification |
| Red jersey | Denotes the leader of the mountains classification | White jersey | Denotes the leader of the young rider classification |

=== General classification ===
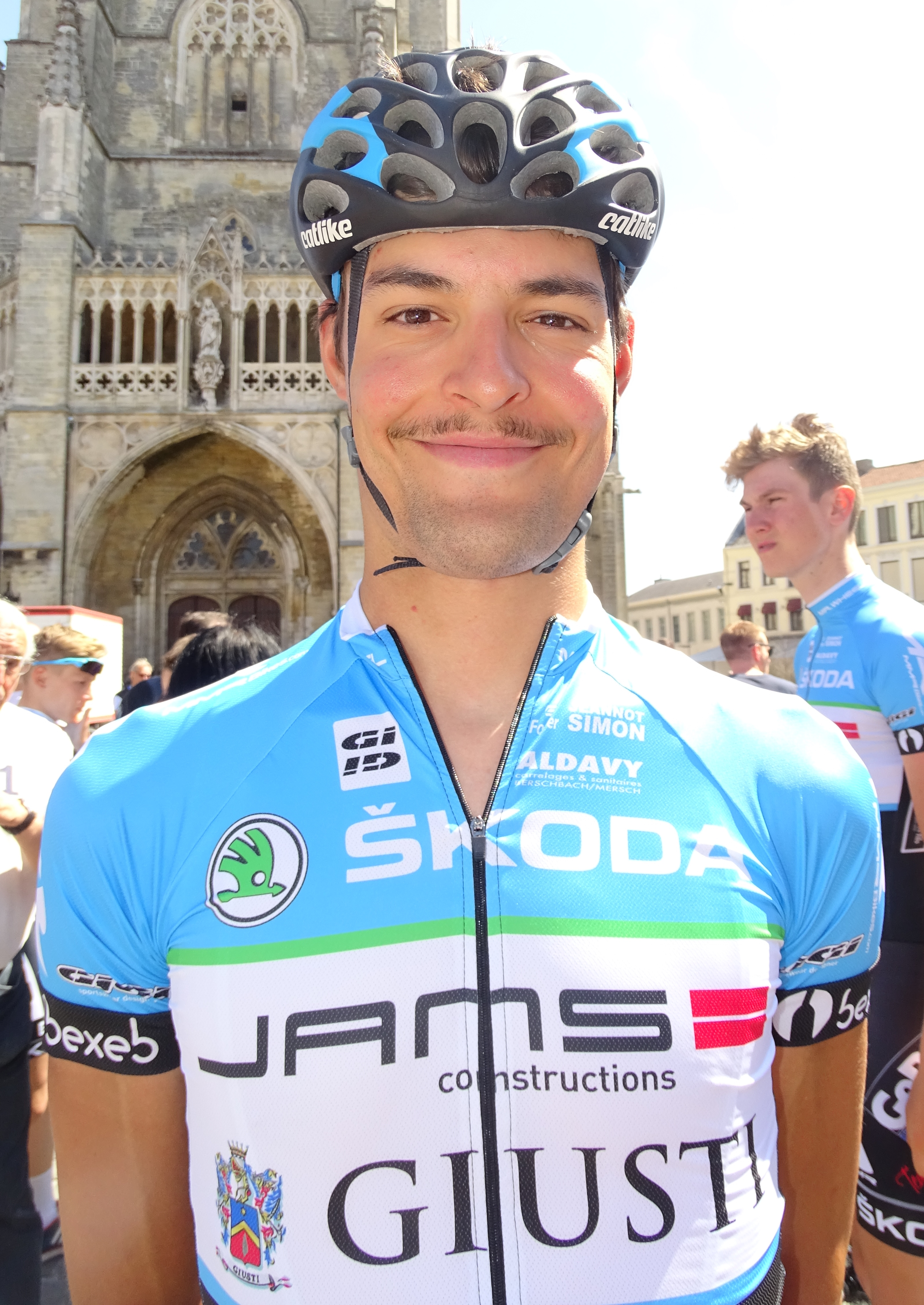
Tom Thill

General classification (1–10)
| Rank | Rider | Team | Time |
|---|---|---|---|
| 1 | Tom Thill (LUX) | Differdange–Losch | 15h 31' 02" |
| 2 | Andi Bajc (SLO) | Amplatz-BMC | + 44" |
| 3 | James Early (NZL) | Team Stölting | + 1' 51" |
| 4 | Patrik Tybor (SVK) | Kemo–Dukla Trenčín | + 2' 02" |
| 5 | Oostra Folkert (NED) | West-Frisia | + 2' 11" |
| 6 | Moritz Backofen (GER) | Team Stölting | + 3' 19" |
| 7 | Stefan Stefanović (SRB) | Serbia (national team) | + 3' 27" |
| 8 | Krisztián Lovassy (HUN) | Differdange–Losch | + 3' 35" |
| 9 | Johan Coenen (BEL) | Differdange–Losch | + 3' 37" |
| 10 | Janis Dakteris (LAT) | Differdange–Losch | + 3' 52" |

=== Points classification ===
Points classification (1–10)
| Rank | Rider | Team | Points |
|---|---|---|---|
| 1 | Jan Tratnik (SLO) | Amplatz-BMC | 15 |
| 2 | Marek Čanecký (SVK) | Amplatz-BMC | 15 |
| 3 | Ivan Stević (SRB) | Serbia (national team) | 14 |
| 4 | Manuel Porzner (GER) | Team Stölting | 11 |
| 5 | Krisztián Lovassy (HUN) | Differdange–Losch | 10 |
| 6 | Zoltán Ruttkay (HUN) | Hungary (national team) | 10 |
| 7 | Maroš Kováč (SVK) | Kemo–Dukla Trenčín | 10 |
| 8 | Andi Bajc (SLO) | Amplatz-BMC | 9 |
| 9 | Maximillian Kuen (AUT) | Amplatz-BMC | 9 |
| 10 | Janis Dakteris (LAT) | Differdange–Losch | 6 |

=== Mountains classification ===
Mountains classification (1–10)
| Rank | Rider | Team | Points |
|---|---|---|---|
| 1 | Marius Hafsås (NOR) | Team Fixit.no | 19 |
| 2 | Patrik Tybor (SVK) | Kemo–Dukla Trenčín | 16 |
| 3 | Andi Bajc (SLO) | Amplatz-BMC | 13 |
| 4 | Tom Thill (LUX) | Differdange–Losch | 9 |
| 5 | Johan Coenen (BEL) | Differdange–Losch | 7 |
| 6 | Krisztián Lovassy (HUN) | Differdange–Losch | 6 |
| 7 | Moritz Backofen (GER) | Team Stölting | 6 |
| 8 | Jan Tratnik (SLO) | Amplatz-BMC | 3 |
| 9 | Maximillian Kuen (AUT) | Amplatz-BMC | 3 |
| 10 | Folkert Oostra (NED) | West-Frisia | 3 |

=== Young riders classification ===
Young riders classification [under 23] (1–10)
| Rank | Rider | Team | Time |
|---|---|---|---|
| 1 | Moritz Backofen (GER) | Team Stölting | 13h 34' 21" |
| 2 | Stefan Stefanović (SRB) | Serbia (national team) | + 8" |
| 3 | Adne van Engelen (NED) | West-Frisia | + 54" |
| 4 | Sjors Dekker (NED) | West-Frisia | + 1' 26" |
| 5 | Axel Costa (ESP) | Start-Massi | + 1' 34" |
| 6 | Balázs Rózsa (HUN) | Utensilnord | + 2' 15" |
| 7 | Viktor Filutás (HUN) | Utensilnord | + 2' 32" |
| 8 | Dániel Móricz (HUN) | Utensilnord | + 2' 37" |
| 9 | Márton Dina (HUN) | Cube-Csömör | + 3' 28" |
| 10 | András Kriván (HUN) | Mugenrace Prolog | + 5' 35" |

=== Team classification ===
Team classification (1–5)
| Rank | Team | Time |
|---|---|---|
| 1 | Amplatz-BMC | 36h 44' 46" |
| 2 | Differdange–Losch | + 1" |
| 3 | West-Frisia | + 5' 02" |
| 4 | Utensilnord | + 8' 57" |
| 5 | Start-Massi | + 9' 19" |

== See also ==
- 2015 in men's road cycling
- 2015 in sports
