= 2018 Tour of Slovenia =

2018 UCI Europe Tour (2.1 race)
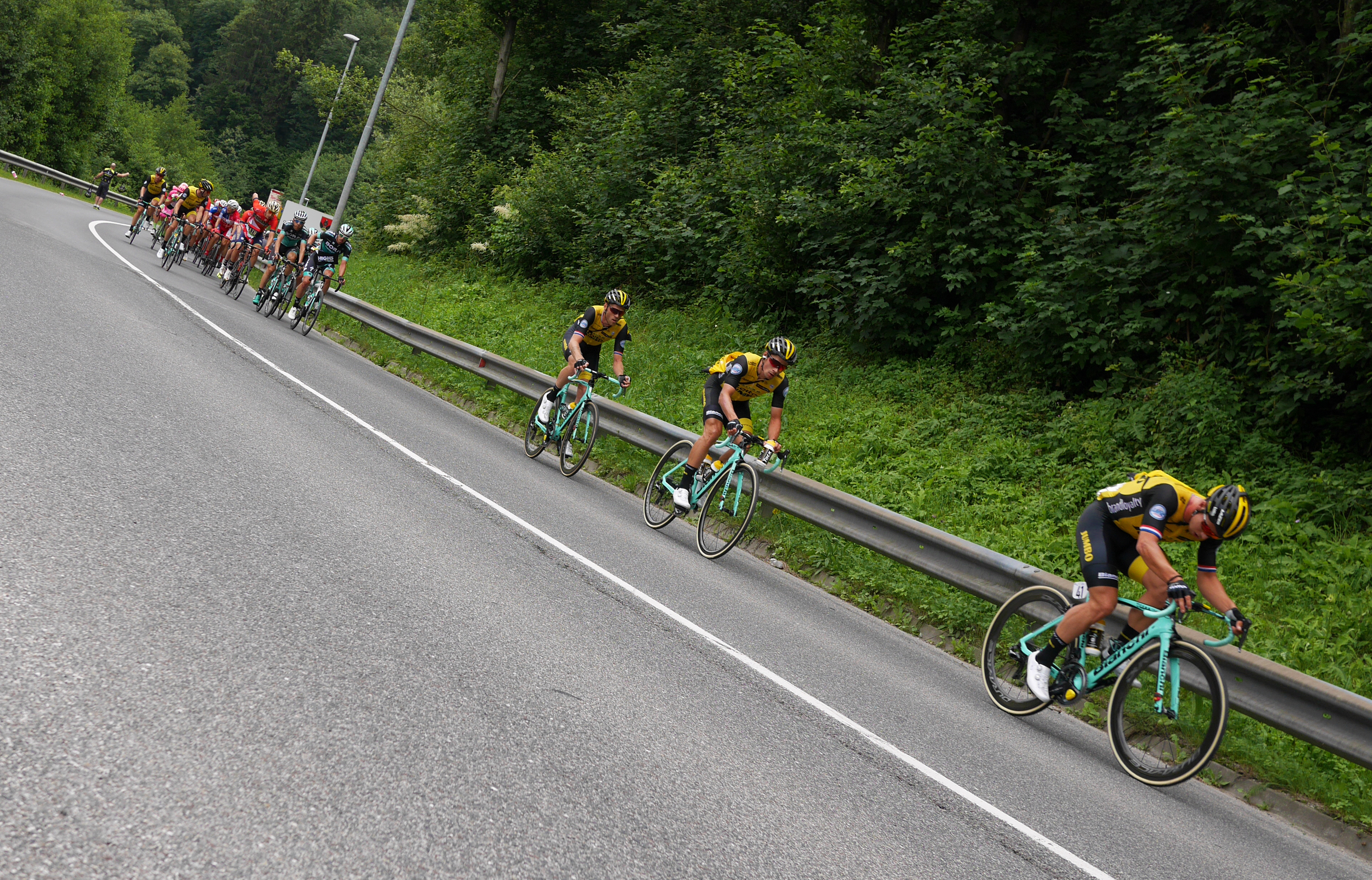
- 3rd stage of Tour of Slovenia 2018

Race details
- Dates: 13–17 June
- Stages: 5
- Distance: 664.1 km (412.7 mi)
- Winning time: 15h 18' 13"

Results
Jersey awarded to the overall winner	Winner	(Slovenia) Primož Roglič	(LottoNL–Jumbo)
	Second	(Colombia) Rigoberto Urán	(EF Education First–Drapac)
	Third	(Slovenia) Matej Mohorič	(Bahrain–Merida)
Jersey awarded to the points classification winner	Points	(Italy) Simone Consonni	(UAE Team Emirates)
Jersey awarded to the mountains classification winner	Mountains	(Italy) Fausto Masnada	(Androni Giocattoli–Sidermec)
Jersey awarded to the youth classification winner	Youth	(Slovenia) Tadej Pogačar	(Ljubljana Gusto Xaurum)
	Team	(Germany) Team Sunweb	

The 2018 Tour of Slovenia (Slovene: Dirka po Sloveniji) was the 25th edition of the Tour of Slovenia cycling stage race, held between 13 and 17 June 2018. It was organised as a 2.1 race on the UCI Europe Tour, consisted of 5 stages in total.

The race was decided on its queen stage 4 in the Kamnik–Savinja Alps with climbs to Seeberg Saddle (1218 m), Pavlič Pass (1338 m) and Volovljek Pass (1029 m). The stage was won by Primož Roglič (LottoNL–Jumbo) with a 33-second lead over 2nd-placed Matej Mohorič (Bahrain–Merida), with Rafał Majka (Bora–Hansgrohe) in 3rd.

== Teams ==
Total 151 riders (143 finished it) from 22 teams started the race.

9 UCI WorldTeams and 13 UCI Professional Continental and Continental teams

UCI WorldTeams

- Bahrain–Merida
- Bora–Hansgrohe
- Team Dimension Data
- LottoNL–Jumbo
- Team Sunweb
- UAE Team Emirates
- EF Education First–Drapac p/b Cannondale
- Mitchelton–Scott
- Team Katusha–Alpecin

UCI Professional Continental teams

- Gazprom–RusVelo
- Nippo–Vini Fantini–Europa Ovini
- Israel Cycling Academy
- Wilier Triestina–Selle Italia
- Androni–Sidermec–Bottecchia

UCI Continental teams

- Adria Mobil
- My Bike–Stevens
- Elkov–Author
- Meridiana–Kamen
- Ljubljana Gusto Xaurum
- Sangemini–MG.K Vis Vega
- Dukla Banská Bystrica

National teams

- Slovenia

== Route and stages ==
Stage characteristics and winners
Stage	Date	Course	Distance	Type	Winner
1	13 June	Lendava – Murska Sobota	159 km (99 mi)	Intermediate stage	(Italy) Simone Consonni
2	14 June	Maribor – Rogaška Slatina	152.7 km (95 mi)	Intermediate stage	(Netherlands) Dylan Groenewegen
3	15 June	Slovenske Konjice – Celje	175.7 km (109 mi)	Intermediate stage	(Colombia) Rigoberto Urán
4	16 June	Ljubljana – Kamnik	155.2 km (96 mi)	Mountain stage	(Slovenia) Primož Roglič
5	17 June	Trebnje – Novo mesto	21.5 km (13 mi)	Individual time trial	(Slovenia) Primož Roglič
Total		664.1 km (412.7 mi)			

=== Stage 1 ===
13 June 2018 — Lendava to Murska Sobota, 159 km (98.8 mi)

Rank	Rider	Team	Time
Official results
1	(Italy) Simone Consonni	UAE Team Emirates	3h 32' 05"
2	(Italy) Matteo Pelucchi	Bora–Hansgrohe	+ 0"
3	(Italy) Niccolò Bonifazio	Bahrain–Merida	+ 0"
4	(Slovenia) Luka Mezgec	Mitchelton–Scott	+ 0"
5	(Germany) Rick Zabel	Team Katusha–Alpecin	+ 0"
6	(Norway) Sondre Holst Enger	Israel Cycling Academy	+ 0"
7	(Netherlands) Timo Roosen	LottoNL–Jumbo	+ 0"
8	(Slovenia) Rok Korošec	My Bike–Stevens	+ 0"
9	(Italy) Sacha Modolo	Cannondale–Drapac	+ 0"
10	(Italy) Luca Colnaghi	Sangemini–MG.K Vis Vega	+ 0"
General classification after the stage
1	(Italy) Simone Consonni	UAE Team Emirates	3h 31' 55"
2	(Australia) Benjamin Hill	Ljubljana Gusto Xaurum	+ 2"
3	(Slovenia) Jon Božič	Adria Mobil	+ 3"
4	(Italy) Matteo Pelucchi	Bora–Hansgrohe	+ 4"
5	(Italy) Niccolò Bonifazio	Bahrain–Merida	+ 6"
6	(Slovakia) Juraj Belan	Dukla Banská Bystrica	+ 8"
7	(Slovenia) Luka Mezgec	Mitchelton–Scott	+ 10"
8	(Germany) Rick Zabel	Team Katusha–Alpecin	+ 10"
9	(Norway) Sondre Holst Enger	Israel Cycling Academy	+ 10"
10	(Netherlands) Timo Roosen	LottoNL–Jumbo	+ 10"

=== Stage 2 ===
14 June 2018 — Maribor to Rogaška Slatina, 152.7 km (94.9 mi)

Rank	Rider	Team	Time
Official results
1	(Netherlands) Dylan Groenewegen	LottoNL–Jumbo	3h 35' 43"
2	(Italy) Matteo Pelucchi	Bora–Hansgrohe	+ 0"
3	(Australia) Caleb Ewan	Mitchelton–Scott	+ 0"
4	(Italy) Simone Consonni	UAE Team Emirates	+ 0"
5	(Italy) Manuel Belletti	Androni Giocattoli–Sidermec	+ 0"
6	(United Kingdom) Mark Cavendish	Team Dimension Data	+ 0"
7	(Serbia) Dušan Rajović	Adria Mobil	+ 0"
8	(Italy) Damiano Cima	Nippo–Vini Fantini–Europa Ovini	+ 0"
9	(Slovenia) Rok Korošec	My Bike–Stevens	+ 0"
10	(Italy) Paolo Totò	Sangemini–MG.K Vis Vega	+ 0"
General classification after the stage
1	(Australia) Benjamin Hill	Ljubljana Gusto Xaurum	7h 7' 33"
2	(Italy) Matteo Pelucchi	Bora–Hansgrohe	+ 3"
3	(Italy) Simone Consonni	UAE Team Emirates	+ 5"
4	(Netherlands) Dylan Groenewegen	LottoNL–Jumbo	+ 5"
5	(Slovenia) Gašper Katrašnik	Adria Mobil	+ 7"
6	(Slovenia) Jon Božič	Adria Mobil	+ 8"
7	(Australia) Caleb Ewan	Mitchelton–Scott	+ 11"
8	(Slovakia) Juraj Bellan	Dukla Banská Bystrica	+ 13"
9	(Slovenia) Rok Korošec	My Bike–Stevens	+ 15"
10	(Slovenia) Luka Mezgec	Mitchelton–Scott	+ 15"

=== Stage 3 ===
15 June 2018 — Slovenske Konjice to Celje, 175.7 km (109.2 mi)

Rank	Rider	Team	Time
Official results
1	(Colombia) Rigoberto Urán	EF Education First–Drapac p/b Cannondale	4h 56' 00"
2	(South Africa) Daryl Impey	Mitchelton–Scott	+ 0"
3	(Slovenia) Primož Roglič	LottoNL–Jumbo	+ 4"
4	(Poland) Rafał Majka	Bora–Hansgrohe	+ 4"
5	(Russia) Ildar Arslanov	Gazprom–RusVelo	+ 6"
6	(Croatia) Robert Kišerlovski	Team Katusha–Alpecin	+11"
7	(Italy) Marco Canola	Nippo–Vini Fantini–Europa Ovini	+ 12'
8	(Australia) Michael Storer	Team Sunweb	+ 14"
9	(Italy) Davide Formolo	Bora–Hansgrohe	+ 14"
10	(Slovenia) Matej Mohorič	Bahrain–Merida	+ 17"
General classification after the stage
1	(Colombia) Rigoberto Urán	EF Education First–Drapac p/b Cannondale	11h 08' 34"
2	(South Africa) Daryl Impey	Mitchelton–Scott	+ 4"
3	(Slovenia) Primož Roglič	LottoNL–Jumbo	+ 10"
4	(Poland) Rafał Majka	Bora–Hansgrohe	+ 14"
5	(Russia) Ildar Arslanov	Gazprom–RusVelo	+ 16"
6	(Croatia) Robert Kišerlovski	Team Katusha–Alpecin	+21"
7	(Italy) Marco Canola	Nippo–Vini Fantini–Europa Ovini	+ 22'
8	(Italy) Davide Formolo	Bora–Hansgrohe	+ 24"
9	(Australia) Michael Storer	Team Sunweb	+ 24"
10	(Slovenia) Matej Mohorič	Bahrain–Merida	+ 25"

=== Stage 4 ===
16 June 2018 — Ljubljana to Kamnik, 155.2 km (96.4 mi)

Rank	Rider	Team	Time
Official results
1	(Slovenia) Primož Roglič	LottoNL–Jumbo	3h 44' 53"
2	(Slovenia) Matej Mohorič	Bahrain–Merida	+ 33"
3	(Poland) Rafał Majka	Bora–Hansgrohe	+ 33"
4	(Slovenia) Tadej Pogačar	Ljubljana Gusto Xaurum	+ 33"
5	(Colombia) Rigoberto Urán	EF Education First–Drapac p/b Cannondale	+ 33"
6	(Australia) Michael Storer	Team Sunweb	+ 33"
7	(South Africa) Ildar Arslanov	Gazprom–RusVelo	+ 33"
8	(Australia) Christoper Hamilton	Team Sunweb	+ 33"
9	(Slovenia) Janez Brajkovič	Adria Mobil	+ 33"
10	(Colombia) Iván Sosa	Androni Giocattoli–Sidermec	+ 33"
General classification after the stage
1	(Slovenia) Primož Roglič	LottoNL–Jumbo	14h 53' 27"
2	(Colombia) Rigoberto Urán	EF Education First–Drapac p/b Cannondale	+ 33"
3	(Poland) Rafał Majka	Bora–Hansgrohe	+ 43"
4	(Russia) Ildar Arslanov	Gazprom–RusVelo	+ 49"
5	(Slovenia) Matej Mohorič	Bahrain–Merida	+ 52"
6	(Australia) Michael Storer	Team Sunweb	+ 57"
7	(Slovenia) Tadej Pogačar	Ljubljana Gusto Xaurum	+ 1' 00"
8	(Slovenia) Janez Brajkovič	Adria Mobil	+1' 07"
9	(Croatia) Robert Kišerlovski	Team Katusha–Alpecin	+1' 59"
10	(Italy) Marco Canola	Nippo–Vini Fantini–Europa Ovini	+ 2' 00"

=== Stage 5 ===
17 June 2018 — Trebnje to Novo mesto, 21.5 km (13.4 mi)

Rank	Rider	Team	Time
Official results
1	(Slovenia) Primož Roglič	LottoNL–Jumbo	24' 46"
2	(Slovenia) Jan Tratnik	CCC–Sprandi–Polkowice	+ 27.08"
3	(Czech Republic) Josef Černý	Elkov–Author	+ 35.87"
4	(New Zealand) Jack Bauer	Mitchelton–Scott	+ 38.12"
5	(New Zealand) Thomas Scully	EF Education First–Drapac p/b Cannondale	+ 43.62"
6	(Australia) Luke Durbridge	Mitchelton–Scott	+ 46.75"
7	(Germany) Roger Kluge	Mitchelton–Scott	+ 47.31"
8	(United Kingdom) Alex Dowsett	Team Katusha–Alpecin	+ 51.63"
9	(Norway) Vegard Stake Laengen	UAE Team Emirates	+ 52.66"
10	(Germany) Nils Politt	Team Katusha–Alpecin	+ 55.81"

== Classification leadership ==
Points for the mountains classification
Position	1	2	3	4	5
Points for Category 1	12	8	6	4	2
Points for Category 2	6	4	2	0	
Points for Category 3	3	2	1	0	
Points for Category 4	1	0		0	

In the 2018 Tour of Slovenia, four different jerseys were awarded. The general classification was calculated by adding each cyclist's finishing times on each stage, and allowing time bonuses for the first three finishers at intermediate sprints (three seconds to first, two seconds to second and one second to third) and at the finish of mass-start stages; these were awarded to the first three finishers on all stages: the stage winner won a ten-second bonus, with six and four seconds for the second and third riders respectively. The leader of the classification received a green jersey and the winner of the general classification was considered the winner of the race.

Additionally, there was a points classification, which awarded a red jersey. In the points classification, cyclists received points for finishing in the top 15 in a stage. For winning a stage, a rider earned 25 points, with 20 for second, 16 for third, 14 for fourth, 12 for fifth, 10 for sixth and a point fewer per place down to 1 point for 15th place. Points towards the classification could also be accrued – awarded on a 5–3–1 scale – at intermediate sprint points during each stage; these intermediate sprints also offered bonus seconds towards the general classification as noted above.

Mountains classification, the leadership of which was marked by a blue jersey. In the mountains classification, points towards the classification were won by reaching the top of a climb before other cyclists. Each climb was categorised as either first, second, third or fourth-category, with more points available for the higher-categorised climbs. The fourth and final jersey represented the classification for young riders, marked by a white jersey. This was decided the same way as the general classification, but only riders born after 1 January 1996 were eligible to be ranked in the classification. There was also a classification for teams, in which the times of the best three cyclists per team on each stage were added together; the leading team at the end of the race was the team with the lowest total time.

Best young rider (under 23 years) by time was awarded with white jersey.

Best team, three best times of cyclists of the same team are taken into account.

Classification leadership by stage
Stage	Winner	General classification	Points classification	Mountains classification	Young rider classification	Team classification
1	Simone Consonni	Simone Consonni	Simone Consonni	Benjamin Hill	Jon Božič	Bahrain–Merida
2	Dylan Groenewegen	Benjamin Hill	Matteo Pelucchi	Benjamin Hill	Jon Božič	Adria Mobil
3	Rigoberto Urán	Rigoberto Urán	Matteo Pelucchi	Primož Roglič	Michael Storer	Gazprom–RusVelo
4	Primož Roglič	Primož Roglič	Simone Consonni	Fausto Masnada	Michael Storer	Team Sunweb
5	Primož Roglič	Primož Roglič	Simone Consonni	Fausto Masnada	Tadej Pogačar	Team Sunweb
Final		Primož Roglič	Simone Consonni	Fausto Masnada	Tadej Pogačar	Team Sunweb

== Final classification standings ==
Legend
General classification	Denotes the winner of the General classification	Points classification	Denotes the winner of the Points classification
Mountains classification	Denotes the winner of the Mountains classification	Young rider classification	Denotes the winner of the Young rider classification

=== General classification ===
Rank	Rider	Team	Time
1	(Slovenia) Primož Roglič	LottoNL–Jumbo	15h 18' 13"
2	(Colombia) Rigoberto Urán	EF Education First–Drapac p/b Cannondale	+1' 50"
3	(Slovenia) Matej Mohorič	Bahrain–Merida	+2' 14"
4	(Slovenia) Tadej Pogačar	Ljubljana Gusto Xaurum	+2' 16"
5	(Australia) Michael Storer	Team Sunweb	+2' 18"
6	(Poland) Rafał Majka	Bora–Hansgrohe	+2 '21"
7	(Czech Republic) Josef Černý	Elkov–Author	+3' 09"
8	(Slovenia) Janez Brajkovič	Adria Mobil	+3' 15"
9	(Russia) Ildar Arslanov	Gazprom–RusVelo	+3' 15"
10	(Norway) Vegard Stake Laengen	UAE Team Emirates	+ 3' 16"

=== Points classification ===
Rank	Rider	Team	Points
1	(Italy) Simone Consonni	UAE Team Emirates	52
2	(Italy) Matteo Pelucchi	Bora–Hansgrohe	44
3	(Slovenia) Primož Roglič	LottoNL–Jumbo	41
4	(Colombia) Rigoberto Urán	UAE Team Emirates	37
5	(Poland) Rafał Majka	Bora–Hansgrohe	30
6	(Slovenia) Matej Mohorič	Bahrain–Merida	29
7	(Netherlands) Dylan Groenewegen	LottoNL–Jumbo	25
8	(Australia) Ben Hill	Ljubljana Gusto Xaurum	24
9	(Russia) Ildar Arslanov	Gazprom–RusVelo	21
10	(Slovenia) Tadej Pogačar	Ljubljana Gusto Xaurum	19

=== Mountains classification ===
Rank	Rider	Team	Points
1	(Italy) Fausto Masnada	Androni Giocattoli–Sidermec	18
2	(Slovenia) Primož Roglič	LottoNL–Jumbo	12
3	(Slovenia) Domen Novak	Bahrain–Merida	8
4	(Russia) Alexander Foliforov	Gazprom–RusVelo	6
5	(Australia) Ben Hill	Ljubljana Gusto Xaurum	4
6	(Colombia) Rigoberto Urán	UAE Team Emirates	4
7	(Poland) Rafał Majka	Bora–Hansgrohe	4
8	(Russia) Ildar Arslanov	Gazprom–RusVelo	4
9	(Australia) Jai Hindley	Team Sunweb	4
10	(Slovenia) Žiga Grošelj	Adria Mobil	4

=== Young rider classification ===
Rank	Rider	Team	Time
1	(Slovenia) Tadej Pogačar	Ljubljana Gusto Xaurum	15h 20' 29"
2	(Australia) Michael Storer	Team Sunweb	+ 2"
3	(Australia) Jai Hindley	Team Sunweb	+ 1' 44"
4	(Colombia) Iván Sosa	Androni Giocattoli–Sidermec	+ 6' 45"
5	(Czech Republic) Jakub Otruba	Elkov–Author	+ 10' 16"
6	(Italy) Dario Puccioni	Sangemini–MG.K Vis Vega	+ 17' 08"
7	(Spain) Joan Bou	Nippo–Vini Fantini–Europa Ovini	+ 17' 49"
8	(Slovenia) Tilen Finkšt	Ljubljana Gusto Xaurum	+ 19' 05"
9	(Slovenia) Martin Lavrič	Slovenia	+ 19' 17"
10	(Israel) Omer Goldstein	Israel Cycling Academy	+ 20' 40"

=== Team classification ===
Rank	Team	Time
1	(Germany) Team Sunweb	46h 04' 36"
2	(Russia) Gazprom–RusVelo	+ 6' 01"
3	(Germany) Bora–Hansgrohe	+ 6' 19"
4	(Italy) Androni Giocattoli–Sidermec	+ 9' 02"
5	(Slovenia) Adria Mobil	+ 11' 04"
6	(Czech Republic) Elkov–Author	+ 14' 41"
7	Bahrain–Merida	+ 21' 31"
8	(Switzerland) Team Katusha–Alpecin	+ 23' 39"
9	(United Arab Emirates) UAE Team Emirates	+ 27' 24"
10	Israel Cycling Academy	+ 27' 29"
