= Marek Čanecký =

Slovak bicycle racer (born 1988)

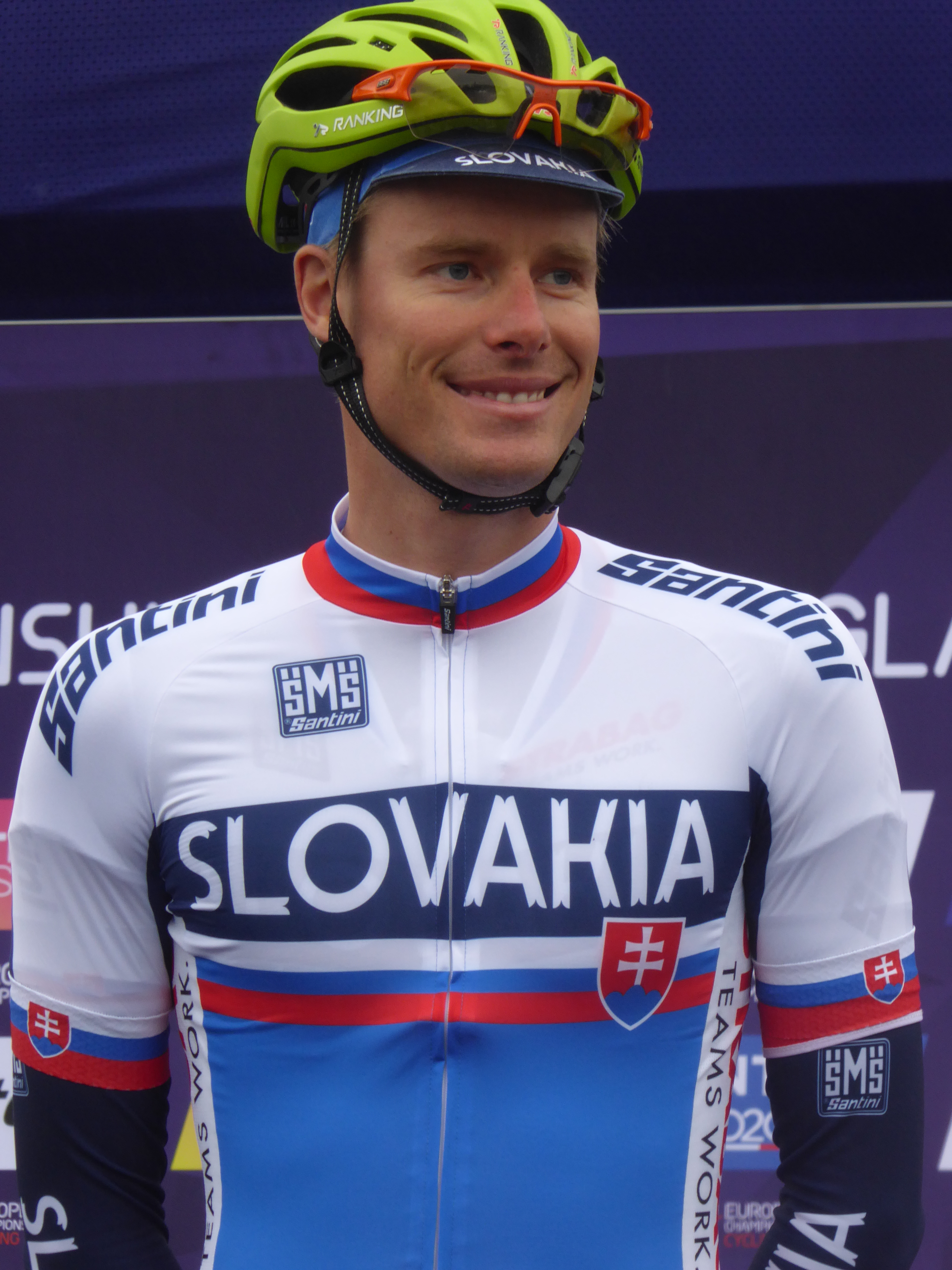
- Čanecký at the 2018 European Road Cycling Championships

Personal information
- Born: 17 June 1988 (age 38) Banská Bystrica, Czechoslovakia
- Height: 1.87 m (6 ft 2 in)
- Weight: 72 kg (159 lb)

Cycling career
- Sport: Cycling
- Current team: Retired
- Discipline: Road
- Role: Rider
- Rider type: Time trialist

Amateur teams
- 2010: World Cycling Centre
- 2022: BRS Kaktus Bike
- 2024: S.C. Cool Bike

Professional teams
- 2011–2012: Manisaspor
- 2013–2017: RSC Amplatz
- 2018–2021: Dukla Banská Bystrica
- 2023: RRK Group–Pierre Baguette–Benzinol

Marek Čanecký (born 17 June 1988 in Banská Bystrica) is a Slovak former cyclist, who competed as a professional from 2011 to 2023.

== Major results ==
2007
9th Grand Prix Bradlo
2009
3rd Time trial, National Under-23 Road Championships
10th Overall Grand Prix Bradlo
2010
1st Time trial, National Under-23 Road Championships
8th Raiffeisen Grand Prix
9th Overall Coupe des nations Ville Saguenay
2011
1st Stage 1 Tour of Marmara
2nd Overall Grand Prix Chantal Biya

1st Stage 2

3rd Road race, National Road Championships
3rd Tour of Vojvodina I
7th Overall Tour of Szeklerland
2012
1st Mountains classification, Grand Prix of Sochi
2013
1st Mountains classification, Oberösterreich Rundfahrt
4th Road race, National Road Championships
9th Scandinavian Race Uppsala
2014
3rd Kerékpárverseny, Visegrad 4 Bicycle Race
2015
1st Stage 2 Tour de Hongrie
3rd Rund um Sebnitz
9th Raiffeisen Grand Prix
2016
National Road Championships

1st Time trial
4th Road race

1st Kerékpárverseny, Visegrad 4 Bicycle Race
4th Croatia–Slovenia
2017
National Road Championships

1st Time trial
4th Road race

6th Raiffeisen Grand Prix
7th Overall Istrian Spring Trophy
2018
1st Time trial, National Road Championships
9th Overall Grand Prix Cycliste de Gemenc
2019
2nd Road race, National Road Championships
2nd Overall Grand Prix Chantal Biya

1st Points classification
1st Stages 2 & 3

3rd Overall Tour du Sénégal
9th Overall In the Steps of Romans

1st Mountains classification

2020
7th Overall Belgrade–Banja Luka
2021
7th Kerékpárverseny, Visegrad 4 Bicycle Race
2022
National Road Championships

2nd Time trial
4th Road race

9th Kerékpárverseny, Visegrad 4 Bicycle Race
2023
National Road Championships

3rd Time trial
5th Road race
