= 2018 Settimana Internazionale di Coppi e Bartali =

2018 UCI Europe Tour

Race details
- Dates: 22–25 March 2018
- Stages: 5
- Distance: 425 km (264.1 mi)
- Winning time: 10h 12' 36"

Results
	Winner	Diego Rosa (ITA)
	Second	Bauke Mollema (NED)
	Third	Richard Carapaz (ECU)
	Points	Chris Lawless (GBR)
	Mountains	Lawson Craddock (USA)
	Youth	Pavel Sivakov (RUS)
	Team	Movistar Team

The 2018 Settimana Internazionale di Coppi e Bartali was a road cycling stage race that took place between 22 and 28 March 2018. The race was rated as a 2.1 event as part of the 2018 UCI Europe Tour, and was the 33rd edition of the Settimana Internazionale di Coppi e Bartali cycling race.

The race was won by Italian rider Diego Rosa of Team Sky.

== Teams ==
Twenty-five teams started the race. Each team had a maximum of seven riders:

UCI WorldTeams

- Team Sky
- LottoNL–Jumbo
- Trek–Segafredo
- EF Education First–Drapac p/b Cannondale
- Movistar Team
- Mitchelton–Scott

UCI Professional Continental teams

- Bardiani–CSF
- WB Aqua Protect Veranclassic
- Delko–Marseille Provence KTM
- Caja Rural–Seguros RGA
- Nippo–Vini Fantini–Europa Ovini
- Fortuneo–Samsic
- Gazprom–RusVelo
- Wanty–Groupe Gobert
- Wilier Triestina–Selle Italia
- Aqua Blue Sport
- Androni Giocattoli–Sidermec
- CCC–Sprandi–Polkowice
- Israel Cycling Academy

UCI Continental teams

- Amore & Vita–Prodir
- ONE Pro Cycling
- Trevigiani Phonix–Hemus 1896
- Sangemini–MG.K Vis Vega
- Biesse–Carrera Gavardo
- MsTina–Focus

== Route ==
Stage characteristics and winners
Stage	Date	Course	Distance	Type	Stage winner
1a	22 March	Gatteo to Gatteo	97.8 km (60.8 mi)	Flat stage	Pascal Eenkhoorn (NED)
1b	22 March	Gatteo a Mare to Gatteo	13.3 km (8.3 mi)	Team time trial	Team Sky
2	23 March	Riccione to Sogliano al Rubicone	130 km (81 mi)	Medium mountain stage	Bauke Mollema (NED)
3	24 March	Crevalcore to Crevalcore	171.4 km (106.5 mi)	Flat stage	Chris Lawless (GBR)
4	25 March	Fiorano Modenese to Fiorano Modenese	12.5 km (7.8 mi)	Individual time trial	Jan Tratnik (SLO)

== Stages ==
=== Stage 1a ===
Stage 1a result

Rank	Rider	Team	Time
1	Pascal Eenkhoorn (NED)	LottoNL–Jumbo	2h 12' 43"
2	Lawson Craddock (USA)	EF Education First–Drapac p/b Cannondale	s.t.
3	Davide Ballerini (ITA)	Androni Giocattoli–Sidermec	+ 1' 07"
4	Chris Lawless (GBR)	Team Sky	s.t.
5	Casper Pedersen (DEN)	Aqua Blue Sport	s.t.
6	Marco Canola (ITA)	Nippo–Vini Fantini–Europa Ovini	s.t.
7	Marco Maronese (ITA)	Bardiani–CSF	s.t.
8	Alessandro Fedeli (ITA)	Trevigiani Phonix–Hemus 1896	s.t.
9	Enrico Battaglin (ITA)	LottoNL–Jumbo	s.t.
10	Riccardo Stacchiotti (ITA)	MsTina–Focus	s.t.

General classification after Stage 1a

Rank	Rider	Team	Time
1	Pascal Eenkhoorn (NED)	LottoNL–Jumbo	2h 12' 37"
2	Lawson Craddock (USA)	EF Education First–Drapac p/b Cannondale	+ 2"
3	Davide Ballerini (ITA)	Androni Giocattoli–Sidermec	+ 1' 11"
4	Chris Lawless (GBR)	Team Sky	+ 1' 13"
5	Casper Pedersen (DEN)	Aqua Blue Sport	s.t.
6	Marco Canola (ITA)	Nippo–Vini Fantini–Europa Ovini	s.t.
7	Marco Maronese (ITA)	Bardiani–CSF	s.t.
8	Alessandro Fedeli (ITA)	Trevigiani Phonix–Hemus 1896	s.t.
9	Enrico Battaglin (ITA)	LottoNL–Jumbo	s.t.
10	Riccardo Stacchiotti (ITA)	MsTina–Focus	s.t.

=== Stage 1b ===
Stage 1b result

Rank	Team	Time
1	Team Sky	14' 44"
2	CCC–Sprandi–Polkowice	+ 10"
3	Mitchelton–Scott	s.t.
4	LottoNL–Jumbo	+ 11"
5	Trek–Segafredo	+ 13"
6	Androni Giocattoli–Sidermec	+ 16"
7	EF Education First–Drapac p/b Cannondale	+ 21"
8	Gazprom–RusVelo	+ 24"
9	Nippo–Vini Fantini–Europa Ovini	+ 29"
10	Wilier Triestina–Selle Italia	+ 30"

General classification after Stage 1b

Rank	Rider	Team	Time
1	Pascal Eenkhoorn (NED)	LottoNL–Jumbo	2h 27' 32"
2	Lawson Craddock (USA)	EF Education First–Drapac p/b Cannondale	+ 12"
3	Chris Lawless (GBR)	Team Sky	+ 1' 02"
4	Diego Rosa (ITA)	Team Sky	s.t.
5	Pavel Sivakov (RUS)	Team Sky	s.t.
6	Jonathan Dibben (GBR)	Team Sky	s.t.
7	Luke Rowe (GBR)	Team Sky	s.t.
8	Jonas Koch (GER)	CCC–Sprandi–Polkowice	+ 1' 12"
9	Jan Tratnik (SLO)	CCC–Sprandi–Polkowice	s.t.
10	Kamil Gradek (POL)	CCC–Sprandi–Polkowice	s.t.

=== Stage 2 ===
Stage 2 result

Rank	Rider	Team	Time
1	Bauke Mollema (NED)	Trek–Segafredo	3h 36' 23"
2	Diego Rosa (ITA)	Team Sky	+ 2"
3	Giulio Ciccone (ITA)	Bardiani–CSF	+ 3"
4	Guillaume Martin (FRA)	Wanty–Groupe Gobert	s.t.
5	Richard Carapaz (ECU)	Movistar Team	s.t.
6	Koen Bouwman (NED)	LottoNL–Jumbo	+ 11"
7	Iván Sosa (COL)	Androni Giocattoli–Sidermec	+ 13"
8	Lucas Hamilton (AUS)	Mitchelton–Scott	+ 33"
9	Davide Ballerini (ITA)	Androni Giocattoli–Sidermec	+ 55"
10	Neilson Powless (USA)	LottoNL–Jumbo	s.t.

General classification after Stage 2

Rank	Rider	Team	Time
1	Diego Rosa (ITA)	Team Sky	6h 04' 53"
2	Bauke Mollema (NED)	Trek–Segafredo	+ 7"
3	Koen Bouwman (NED)	LottoNL–Jumbo	+ 26"
4	Iván Sosa (COL)	Androni Giocattoli–Sidermec	+ 33"
5	Lawson Craddock (USA)	EF Education First–Drapac p/b Cannondale	+ 36"
6	Richard Carapaz (ECU)	Movistar Team	+ 38"
7	Lucas Hamilton (AUS)	Mitchelton–Scott	+ 47"
8	Guillaume Martin (FRA)	Wanty–Groupe Gobert	+ 50"
9	Giulio Ciccone (ITA)	Bardiani–CSF	+ 51"
10	Neilson Powless (USA)	LottoNL–Jumbo	+ 1' 10"

=== Stage 3 ===
Stage 3 result

Rank	Rider	Team	Time
1	Chris Lawless (GBR)	Team Sky	3h 47' 53"
2	Paolo Totò (ITA)	Sangemini–MG.K Vis Vega	s.t.
3	Lorenzo Rota (ITA)	Bardiani–CSF	s.t.
4	Emīls Liepiņš (LAT)	ONE Pro Cycling	s.t.
5	Richard Carapaz (ECU)	Movistar Team	s.t.
6	Mauro Finetto (ITA)	Delko–Marseille Provence KTM	s.t.
7	Fabio Felline (ITA)	Trek–Segafredo	s.t.
8	Alex Turrin (ITA)	Wilier Triestina–Selle Italia	s.t.
9	Nicola Bagioli (ITA)	Nippo–Vini Fantini–Europa Ovini	s.t.
10	Diego Rosa (ITA)	Team Sky	s.t.

General classification after Stage 3

Rank	Rider	Team	Time
1	Diego Rosa (ITA)	Team Sky	9h 52' 46"
2	Bauke Mollema (NED)	Trek–Segafredo	+ 7"
3	Richard Carapaz (ECU)	Movistar Team	+ 38"
4	Lucas Hamilton (AUS)	Mitchelton–Scott	+ 47"
5	Fausto Masnada (ITA)	Androni Giocattoli–Sidermec	+ 1' 22"
6	Christopher Juul-Jensen (DEN)	Mitchelton–Scott	s.t.
7	Pavel Sivakov (RUS)	Team Sky	+ 1' 26"
8	Koen Bouwman (NED)	LottoNL–Jumbo	+ 1' 32"
9	Iván Sosa (COL)	Androni Giocattoli–Sidermec	+ 1' 39"
10	Alex Turrin (ITA)	Wilier Triestina–Selle Italia	+ 1' 50"

=== Stage 4 ===
Stage 4 result

Rank	Rider	Team	Time
1	Jan Tratnik (SLO)	CCC–Sprandi–Polkowice	19' 22"
2	Diego Rosa (ITA)	Team Sky	+ 28"
3	Víctor de la Parte (ESP)	Movistar Team	+ 32"
4	Koen Bouwman (NED)	LottoNL–Jumbo	+ 40"
5	Bauke Mollema (NED)	Trek–Segafredo	+ 41"
6	Neilson Powless (USA)	LottoNL–Jumbo	+ 46"
7	Pavel Sivakov (RUS)	Team Sky	s.t.
8	Eduardo Sepúlveda (ARG)	Movistar Team	+ 47"
9	Richard Carapaz (ECU)	Movistar Team	+ 52"
10	Mauro Finetto (ITA)	Delko–Marseille Provence KTM	s.t.

== Classifications ==
Final general classification

Rank	Rider	Team	Time
1	Diego Rosa (ITA)	Team Sky	10h 12' 36"
2	Bauke Mollema (NED)	Trek–Segafredo	+ 20"
3	Richard Carapaz (ECU)	Movistar Team	+ 1' 02"
4	Pavel Sivakov (RUS)	Team Sky	+ 1' 44"
5	Koen Bouwman (NED)	LottoNL–Jumbo	s.t.
6	Fausto Masnada (ITA)	Androni Giocattoli–Sidermec	+ 1' 51"
7	Lucas Hamilton (AUS)	Mitchelton–Scott	+ 1' 58"
8	Christopher Juul-Jensen (DEN)	Mitchelton–Scott	+ 2' 14"
9	Neilson Powless (USA)	LottoNL–Jumbo	+ 2' 34"
10	Giulio Ciccone (ITA)	Bardiani–CSF	+ 2' 36"

Final points classification

Rank	Rider	Team	Points
1	Chris Lawless (GBR)	Team Sky	15
2	Bauke Mollema (NED)	Trek–Segafredo	10
3	Pascal Eenkhoorn (NED)	LottoNL–Jumbo	10
4	Diego Rosa (ITA)	Team Sky	8
5	Richard Carapaz (ECU)	Movistar Team	8
6	Lawson Craddock (USA)	EF Education First–Drapac p/b Cannondale	8
7	Paolo Totò (ITA)	Sangemini–MG.K Vis Vega	8
8	Giulio Ciccone (ITA)	Bardiani–CSF	6
9	Davide Ballerini (ITA)	Androni Giocattoli–Sidermec	6
10	Lorenzo Rota (ITA)	Bardiani–CSF	6

Final mountains classification

Rank	Rider	Team	Points
1	Lawson Craddock (USA)	EF Education First–Drapac p/b Cannondale	16
2	Marco Minnaard (NED)	Wanty–Groupe Gobert	14
3	Pascal Eenkhoorn (NED)	LottoNL–Jumbo	14
4	Brice Feillu (FRA)	Fortuneo–Samsic	13
5	Giulio Ciccone (ITA)	Bardiani–CSF	8
6	Francesco Gavazzi (ITA)	Androni Giocattoli–Sidermec	8
7	Diego Rosa (ITA)	Team Sky	8
8	Emil Dima (ROM)	MsTina–Focus	8
9	Tyler Williams (USA)	Israel Cycling Academy	7
10	Davide Ballerini (ITA)	Androni Giocattoli–Sidermec	6

Final young rider classification

Rank	Rider	Team	Time
1	Pavel Sivakov (RUS)	Team Sky	10h 14' 20"
2	Lucas Hamilton (AUS)	Mitchelton–Scott	+ 14"
3	Neilson Powless (USA)	LottoNL–Jumbo	+ 50"
4	Iván Sosa (COL)	Androni Giocattoli–Sidermec	+ 1' 06"
5	Artem Nych (RUS)	Gazprom–RusVelo	+ 1' 57"
6	Eddie Dunbar (IRL)	Aqua Blue Sport	+ 2' 00"
7	Alex Aranburu (ESP)	Caja Rural–Seguros RGA	+ 3' 10"
8	Julien Mortier (BEL)	WB Aqua Protect Veranclassic	+ 4' 38"
9	Lorenzo Rota (ITA)	Bardiani–CSF	+ 4' 40"
10	Giovanni Carboni (ITA)	Bardiani–CSF	+ 5' 00"

Final teams classification

Rank	Team	Time
1	Movistar Team	30h 13' 20"
2	LottoNL–Jumbo	+ 1' 04"
3	Androni Giocattoli–Sidermec	+ 1' 45"
4	Aqua Blue Sport	+ 4' 18"
5	Wanty–Groupe Gobert	+ 6' 28"
6	Wilier Triestina–Selle Italia	+ 6' 29"
7	Caja Rural–Seguros RGA	+ 7' 15"
8	Bardiani–CSF	+ 7' 52"
9	Team Sky	+ 11' 32"
10	Gazprom–RusVelo	+ 11' 59"
