= Ildar Arslanov =

Russian cyclist

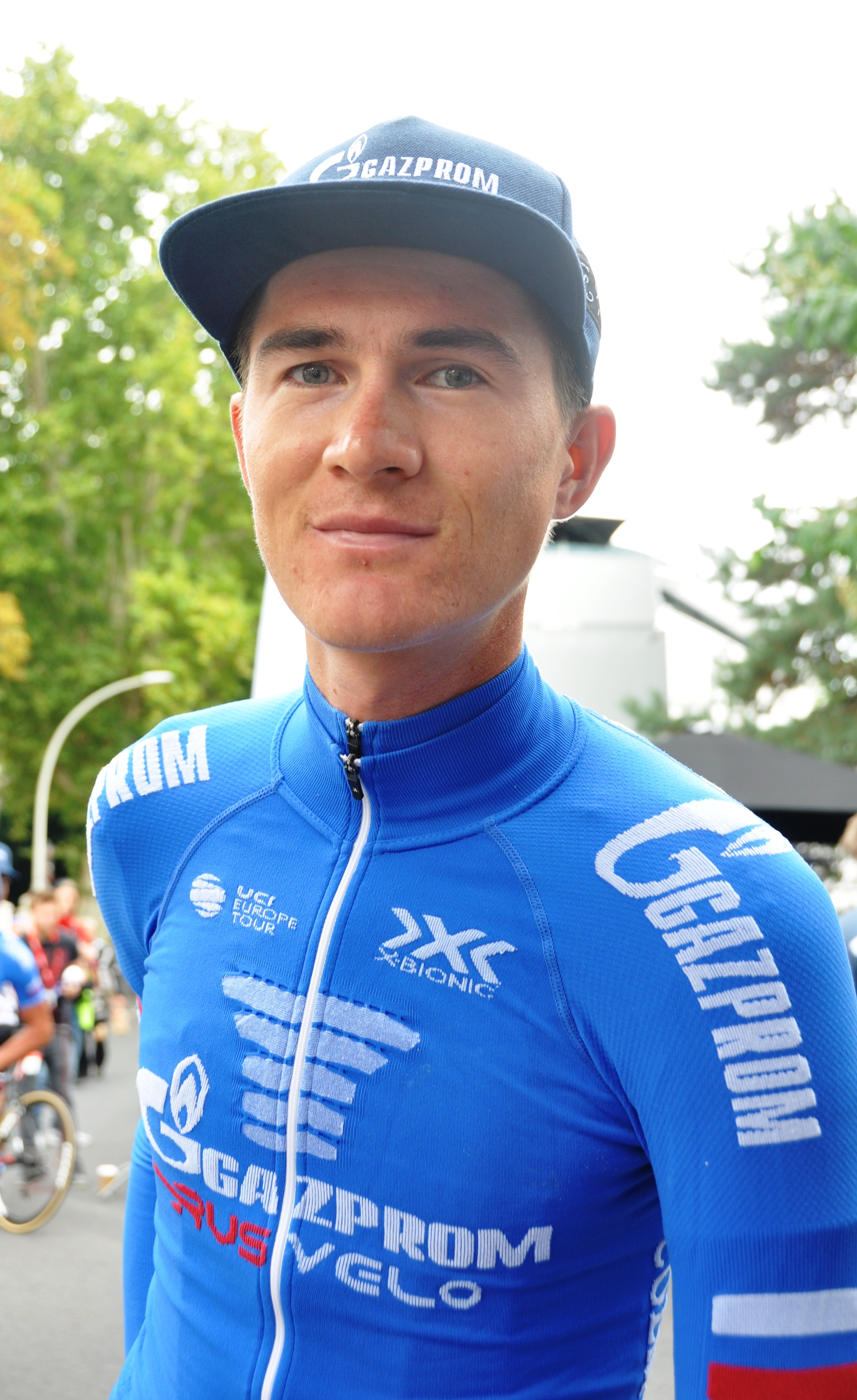
- Arslanov in 2018

Personal information
- Full name: Ildar Rinasovich Arslanov
- Born: 6 April 1994 (age 32) Agidel, Russia
- Height: 185 cm (6 ft 1 in)
- Weight: 63 kg (139 lb)

Cycling career
- Sport: Cycling
- Current team: Retired
- Discipline: Road
- Role: Rider

Professional teams
- 2014: Itera–Katusha
- 2015–2019: RusVelo

Ildar Rinasovich Arslanov (Russian: Ильда́р Рина́сович Арсла́нов; born 6 April 1994) is a Russian former professional racing cyclist, who competed professionally between 2014 and 2019 for the Itera–Katusha and Gazprom–RusVelo teams.

== Major results ==
2011
1st Road race, National Junior Road Championships
2012
1st Road race, National Junior Road Championships
2nd Overall Grand Prix Rüebliland
2013
5th Overall Grand Prix of Adygeya
2014
1st Stage 4 (ITT) Giro della Valle d'Aosta
2015
7th GP Capodarco
9th Trofeo Banca Popolare di Vicenza
2016
5th Overall Tour d'Azerbaïdjan

1st Young rider classification

2017
5th Overall Tour of Turkey
2018
3rd Overall Adriatica Ionica Race
9th Overall Tour of Slovenia
2019
4th Overall Sibiu Cycling Tour
8th Trofeo Laigueglia
