= Johan Coenen =

Belgian cyclist

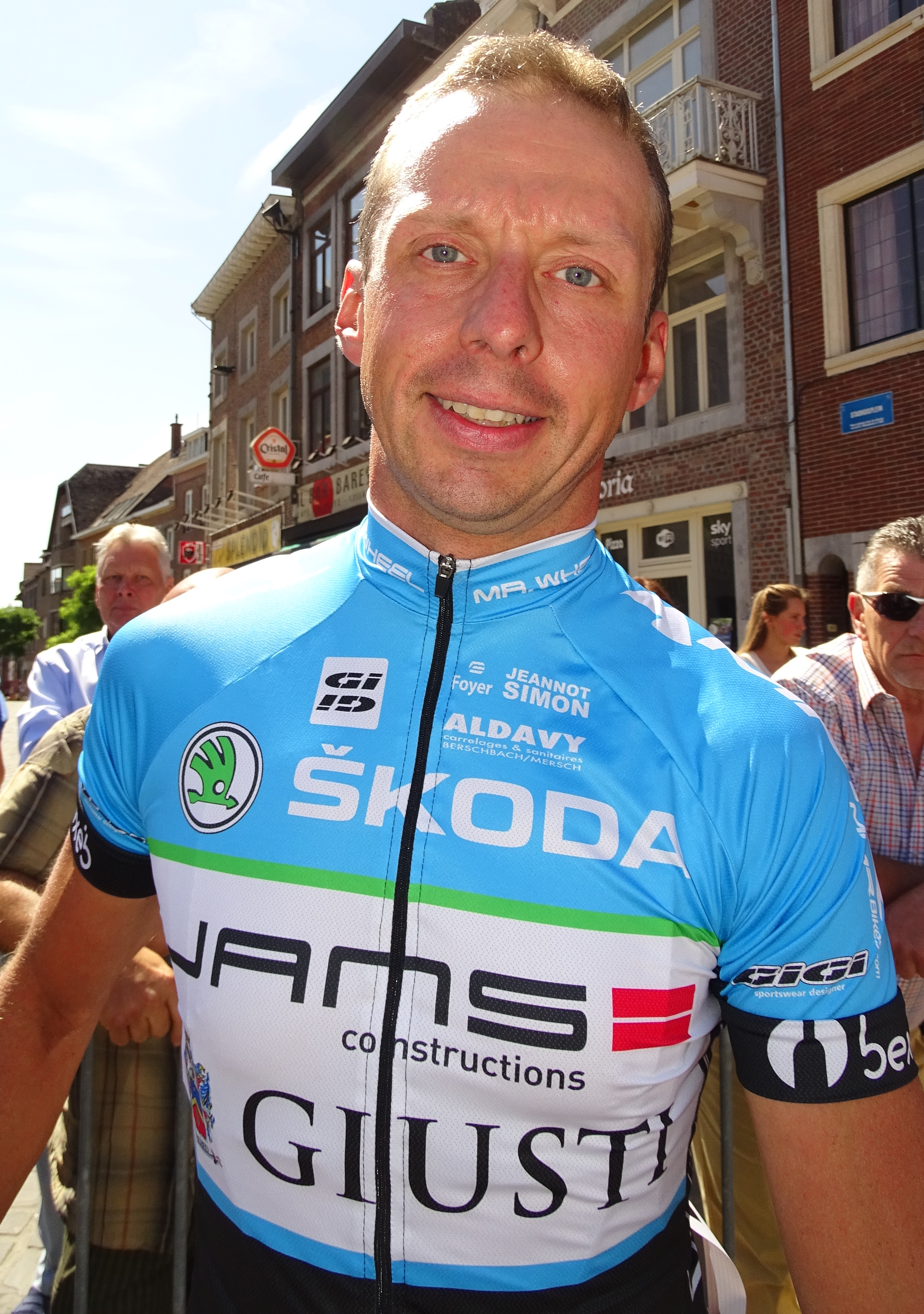

Personal information
- Full name: Johan Coenen
- Born: 4 February 1979 (age 47) Wellen, Belgium
- Height: 1.78 m (5 ft 10 in)
- Weight: 67 kg (148 lb)

Cycling career
- Sport: Cycling
- Current team: Retired
- Discipline: Road
- Role: Rider

Professional teams
- 2002–2003: Marlux
- 2004–2006: Unibet.com
- 2007–2011: Chocolade Jacques–Topsport Vlaanderen
- 2012–2015: Differdange–Magic–SportFood.de

Johan Coenen (born 4 February 1979) is a Belgian former professional road bicycle racer, who rode professionally between 2002 and 2015 for the Marlux, Unibet.com, Topsport Vlaanderen–Mercator and Differdange–Losch teams.

== Major results ==
2000
1st La Côte Picarde
8th Flèche Ardennaise
2002
2nd Tour du Finistère
2003
1st Stage 6 Bayern Rundfahrt
7th Kuurne–Brussels–Kuurne
9th Tour du Doubs
10th Overall Étoile de Bessèges
2004
2nd Rund um den Henninger Turm
2nd Strombeek-Bever Koerse
3rd Paris–Camembert
4th Omloop van het Waasland
7th Overall Tour de Luxembourg
9th Grand Prix Pino Cerami
2005
1st Grand Prix de la Ville de Lillers
7th Flèche Hesbignonne
9th Overall Étoile de Bessèges

1st Mountains classification

10th Overall Tour de Luxembourg
10th Polynormande
2006
1st Circuit de l'Aulne
2nd Grand Prix Pino Cerami
6th Overall Four Days of Dunkirk
6th Grote Prijs Jef Scherens
7th Overall Driedaagse van West-Vlaanderen
7th Overall Tour de Luxembourg
7th Kuurne–Brussels–Kuurne
7th Grand Prix de Plumelec-Morbihan
2007
2nd Zwevegem Koerse
3rd Overall Rheinland-Pfalz Rundfahrt
6th Overall Tour de Wallonie
2008
1st Beverbeek Classic
2nd Wanzele Koerse
6th Schaal Sels
8th Overall Circuit de Lorraine
2009
1st Omloop van het Waasland
2010
2nd Overall Ster Elektrotoer
8th Overall Circuit Franco-Belge
10th Halle–Ingooigem
2012
6th Overall Giro del Friuli-Venezia Giulia

1st Mountains classification

8th Overall Flèche du Sud
8th Ronde Pévéloise
10th Beverbeek Classic
2013
1st Stage 2a Tour de Guadeloupe
2nd Overall Tour de Singkarak

1st Stage 3

8th Overall Boucle de l'Artois
2014
1st Stage 2a Tour de Guadeloupe
6th Circuit de Wallonie
6th Duo Normand (with Boris Carène)
2015
9th Overall Tour de Hongrie
