= 2018 Volta Limburg Classic =

Race details
- Dates: 31 March 2018
- Stages: 1
- Distance: 197.5 km (122.7 mi)
- Winning time: 4h 42' 34"

Results
	Winner	Jan Tratnik (SLO)	(CCC–Sprandi–Polkowice)
	Second	Marco Tizza (ITA)	(Nippo–Vini Fantini–Europa Ovini)
	Third	Jimmy Janssens (BEL)	(Cibel–Cebon)

The 2018 Volta Limburg Classic was the 45th edition of the Volta Limburg Classic cycle race and was held on 31 March 2018. The race started and finished in Eijsden. The race was won by Jan Tratnik.

== Teams ==
Twenty-four teams were invited to take part in the race. These included one UCI WorldTour team, nine UCI Professional Continental teams and fourteen UCI Continental teams.

UCI WorldTour Teams

- LottoNL–Jumbo

UCI Professional Continental Teams

- Aqua Blue Sport
- CCC–Sprandi–Polkowice
- Israel Cycling Academy
- Nippo–Vini Fantini–Europa Ovini
- Roompot–Nederlandse Loterij
- Sport Vlaanderen–Baloise
- Vital Concept
- Wanty–Groupe Gobert
- WB Aqua Protect Veranclassic

UCI Continental Teams

- Alecto Cycling Team
- BEAT Cycling Club
- Canyon Eisberg
- Cibel–Cebon
- Delta Cycling Rotterdam
- Destil–Parkhotel Valkenburg
- Lotto–Kern Haus
- Metec–TKH
- Monkey Town Continental Team
- Riwal CeramicSpeed
- Tarteletto–Isorex
- Team Coop
- Team Virtu Cycling
- Vlasman Track/Road Continental Cycling Team

== Results ==
Result
Rank	Rider	Team	Time
1	Jan Tratnik (SLO)	CCC–Sprandi–Polkowice	4h 42' 34"
2	Marco Tizza (ITA)	Nippo–Vini Fantini–Europa Ovini	+ 1"
3	Jimmy Janssens (BEL)	Cibel–Cebon	+ 1"
4	Thomas Degand (BEL)	Wanty–Groupe Gobert	+ 3"
5	Eddie Dunbar (IRL)	Aqua Blue Sport	+ 5"
6	Jérôme Baugnies (BEL)	Wanty–Groupe Gobert	+ 41"
7	Antoine Warnier (BEL)	WB Aqua Protect Veranclassic	+ 41"
8	Jeroen Meijers (NED)	Roompot–Nederlandse Loterij	+ 53"
9	Aksel Nõmmela (EST)	BEAT Cycling Club	+ 53"
10	Quentin Pacher (FRA)	Vital Concept	+ 53"
