= Ahmet Akdilek =

Turkish racing cyclist (born 1988)

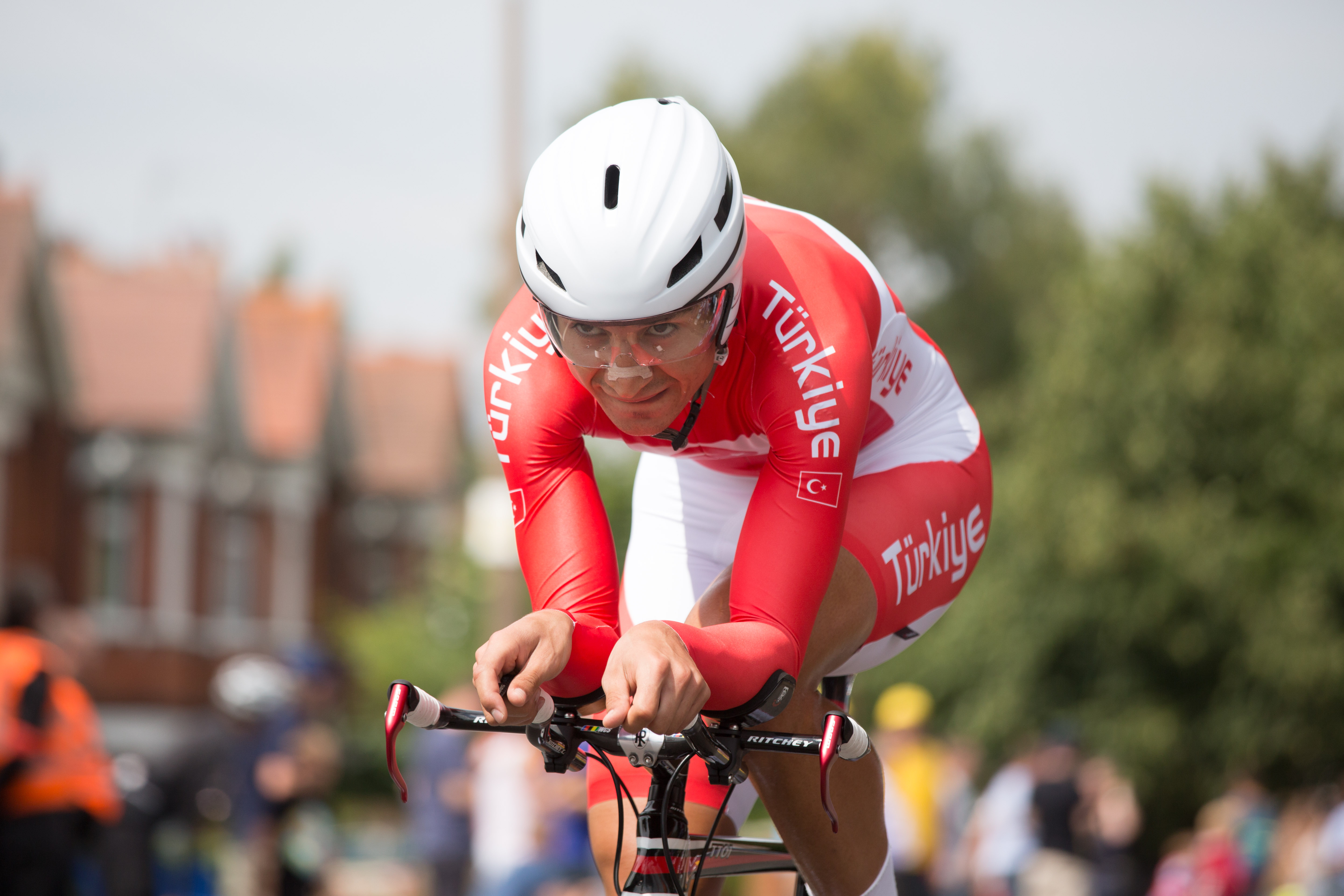
- Akdilek in 2012

Personal information
- Full name: Ahmet Akdilek
- Born: 9 March 1988 (age 38) Konya, Turkey
- Height: 1.78 m (5 ft 10 in)
- Weight: 68 kg (150 lb)

Cycling career
- Sport: Cycling
- Current team: Konya Büyükşehir Belediyespor
- Discipline: Road
- Role: Rider; Directeur sportif

Professional teams
- 2011–2012: Manisaspor
- 2013–2018: Torku Şekerspor
- 2019: Salcano–Sakarya BB Team

Managerial team
- 2023–: Konya Büyükşehir Belediyespor

Ahmet Akdilek (born 9 March 1988) is a Turkish former road cyclist, who competed as a professional from 2011 to 2019. He now works as a directeur sportif for UCI Continental team Konya Büyükşehir Belediyespor.

He qualified for participation in the men's road race at the 2012 Summer Olympics. He also competed in the men's time trial. When riding under the national team, he was coached by Luka Zele.

== Major results ==
2012
4th Overall Tour of Trakya
2013
National Road Championships

8th Road race
8th Time trial

2015
1st Road race, National Road Championships
1st Tour of Çanakkale

1st Prologue

9th GP Oued Eddahab, Les Challenges de la Marche Verte
2017
3rd Trophée Princier, Challenge du Prince
