= Manisaspor Cycling Team =

Team information
- Registered: Manisa, Turkey
- Founded: 2010
- Disbanded: 2012
- Discipline: Road / Mountainbike
- Status: Defunct
- Bicycles: Salcano

Manisaspor Cycling Team was a Turkish professional cycling team, based in Manisa. The team was the men's and women's cycling department of Manisaspor, a major sports club in Manisa, Turkey. In 2011, the team became Turkey's first ever professional bicycle racing team which has UCI Continental team status.

In 2011, Turkish cyclists (Ahmet Akdilek, Recep Ünalan, Mustafa Çarşı, Egemen Erçevik, Mevlüt Erkan, Ali Gülcan, Fatih Harmancı, Bünyamin Özdemir, Timur Taşcan, Serbian Gabor Kasa, Slovak Marek Čanecký, Slovenians Andi Bajc, Dean Podgornik and Tadej Valjavec and New Zealender Jeremy Yates) were in the road discipline team.
