= 2016 Tour d'Azerbaïdjan =

2016 UCI Europe Tour

Race details
- Dates: 4–8 May
- Stages: 5
- Distance: 790.5 km (491.2 mi)
- Winning time: 18hr 59' 12"

Results
Jersey awarded to the overall winner	Winner	Markus Eibegger (AUT)	(Team Felbermayr–Simplon Wels)
	Second	Rinaldo Nocentini (ITA)	(Sporting / Tavira)
	Third	Nikita Stalnov (KAZ)	(Astana City)
Jersey awarded to the points classification winner	Points	Daniel Schorn (AUT)	(Team Felbermayr–Simplon Wels)
Jersey awarded to the mountains classification winner	Mountains	Thomas Lebas (FRA)	(Bridgestone–Anchor)
Jersey awarded to the youth classification winner	Youth	Ildar Arslanov (RUS)	(Gazprom–RusVelo)
	Team	Synergy Baku	

The 2016 Tour d'Azerbaïdjan was a five-day cycling stage race that took place in Azerbaijan in May 2016. The race is the fifth edition of the Tour d'Azerbaïdjan. It was rated as a 2.1 event as part of the 2016 UCI Europe Tour. The race included five stages, starting in Baku on 4 May and returning there for the finish on 8 May.

The race was won by Markus Eibegger (Adria Mobil). He finished the race 2 seconds ahead of Rinaldo Nocentini (Sporting / Tavira), with Nikita Stalnov (Astana City) third. Eibegger's teammate Daniel Schorn won a stage and the points classification, while Synergy Baku won both the team classification and the mountains classification through Alex Surutkovich. The youth classification was won by Ildar Arslanov (Gazprom–RusVelo).

== Schedule ==
Stage characteristics and winners
Stage	Date	Course	Distance	Type	Winner
1	4 May	Baku to Sumqayit	153.5 km (95 mi)	Flat stage	Phil Bauhaus (GER)
2	5 May	Baku to İsmayıllı	186.5 km (116 mi)	Hilly stage	Maksym Averin (AZE)
3	6 May	Qabala to Qabala	177.2 km (110 mi)	Hilly stage	Matej Mugerli (SLO)
4	7 May	Qabala to Pirqulu	115.3 km (72 mi)	Intermediate stage	Luca Wackermann (ITA)
5	8 May	Baku to Baku (3 lap)	158 km (98 mi)	Hilly stage	Michael Schwarzmann (GER)
Total		790.5 km (491.2 mi)			

== Participating teams ==
Twenty-one (21) teams participated in the 2016 edition of the Tour d'Azerbaïdjan.

UCI Professional Continental teams

- Gazprom–RusVelo
- Drapac Professional Cycling
- Bora–Argon 18
- Team Novo Nordisk
- Team Roth
- Wilier Triestina–Southeast

UCI Continental teams

- Synergy Baku
- Alpha Baltic–Maratoni.lv
- Astana City
- Bridgestone–Anchor
- Massi–Kuwait Cycling Project
- Dukla Banská Bystrica
- Al Nasr Pro Cycling Team–Dubai
- Team Felbermayr–Simplon Wels
- Team Illuminate
- Team Sauerland NRW p/b Henley & Partners
- Sporting / Tavira
- Terengganu Cycling Team
- Unieuro–Wilier
- Cycling Academy

National team

- Estonia

== Classification leadership ==
Stage	Winner	General classification	Points classification	Mountains classification	Young rider classification	Team classification
1	Phil Bauhaus	Phil Bauhaus	Phil Bauhaus	Mohd Zamri Salleh	Phil Bauhaus	Unieuro–Wilier
2	Maksym Averin	Guillaume Boivin	Guillaume Boivin	Mauro Finetto	Ildar Arslanov	Synergy Baku
3	Matej Mugerli	Daniel Schorn	Daniel Schorn	Mauro Finetto	Ildar Arslanov	Synergy Baku
4	Luca Wackermann	Markus Eibegger	Luca Wackermann	Thomas Lebas	Ildar Arslanov	Synergy Baku
5	Michael Schwarzmann	Markus Eibegger	Daniel Schorn	Thomas Lebas	Ildar Arslanov	Synergy Baku
Final		Markus Eibegger	Daniel Schorn	Thomas Lebas	Ildar Arslanov	Synergy Baku
