= Sportland Niederösterreich =

Austrian cycling team

SPORT.LAND. Niederösterreich
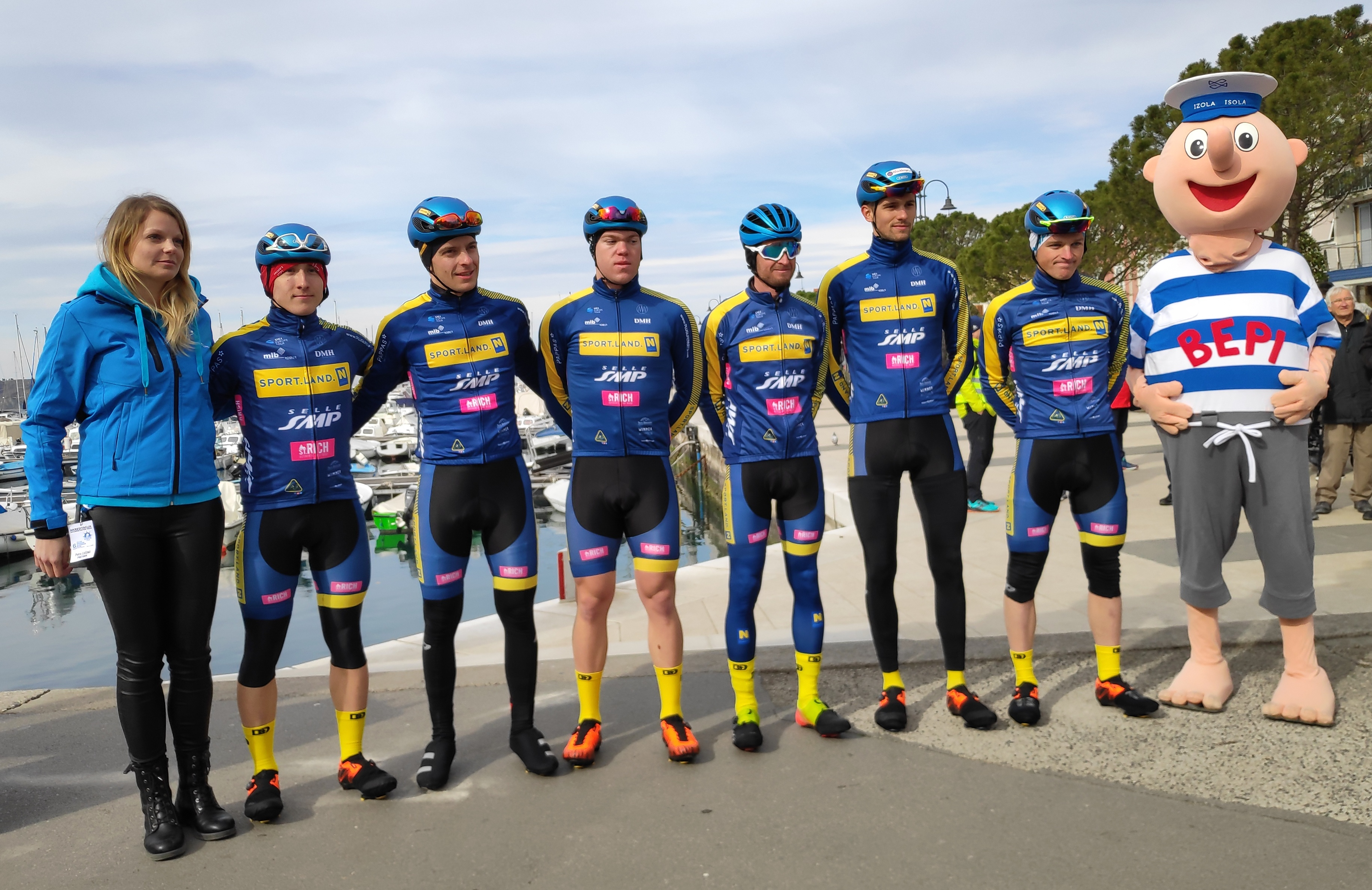
- Team on 2019 GP Izola

Team information
- UCI code: AMP (2014–2017); MBS (2018); CTN (2019–)
- Registered: Austria
- Founded: 2013
- Discipline: Road
- Status: National (2013); UCI Continental (2014–)
- Bicycles: Stevens
- Website: Team home page

Key personnel
- General manager: Patrick Gruber
- Team managers: Josef Gruber; Lukas Viehberger

Team name history
- 2013 2014–2017 2018 2019 2020–: RSC Amplatz; Amplatz–BMC (AMP); My Bike–Stevens (MBS); SPORT.LAND. Niederösterreich Selle SMP–St. Rich (CTN); SPORT.LAND. Niederösterreich (CTN)
Sportland Niederösterreich jersey
Jersey

SPORT.LAND. Niederösterreich is a UCI continental team founded in 2013 and based in Austria. It participates in UCI Continental Circuits races.

== Team roster ==
As of 3 May 2020.

Rider	Date of birth
Andreas Graf (AUT)	7 August 1985 (age 41)
Julian Gruber (AUT)	4 October 1997 (age 28)
Marvin Hammerschmid (AUT)	5 January 1996 (age 30)
Raphael Hammerschmid (AUT)	5 January 1996 (age 30)
Stefan Kolb (AUT)	13 May 1997 (age 29)
Stefan Mastaller (AUT)	7 April 1995 (age 31)

Rider	Date of birth
Matej Mugerli (SLO)	17 June 1981 (age 45)
Luka Pajek (SLO)	17 July 1996 (age 30)
Stefan Pöll (AUT)	28 July 1986 (age 40)
Jakob Reiter (AUT)	12 May 2000 (age 26)
Nikolas Riegler (AUT)	15 September 2001 (age 24)
Jason Saltzman (USA)	18 October 1997 (age 28)

== Major wins ==
2015
Belgrade–Banja Luka II, Andi Bajc
Slovenia National Time Trial Championships, Jan Tratnik
Stage 2 Tour de Hongrie, Marek Čanecký
Stage 4 Tour de Hongrie, Andi Bajc
Stage 5 Tour de Hongrie, Jan Tratnik
Overall East Bohemia Tour, Jan Tratnik

Stage 2, Jan Tratnik

Rund um Sebnitz, Maximilian Kuen
2016
Visegrad 4 Kerékpárverseny, Marek Čanecký
Stage 5 Okolo Slovenska, Jan Tratnik
Slovakia National Time Trial Championships, Marek Čanecký
Hungary National Time Trial Championships, János Pelikán
Slovenia National Road Race Championships, Jan Tratnik
Hungary National Road Race Championships, János Pelikán
Overall East Bohemia Tour, Jan Tratnik

Stage 2, Jan Tratnik

2017
Trofej Umag, Rok Korošec
Poreč Trophy, Matej Mugerli
Overall Istrian Spring Trophy, Matej Mugerli

Stage 2, Matej Mugerli

Stage 3 Tour d'Azerbaïdjan, Matej Mugerli
Stage 3 Okolo Slovenska, Matej Mugerli
Slovakia National Time Trial Championships, Marek Čanecký
2018
Overall Grand Prix Cycliste de Gemenc, Rok Korošec

Stage 1, Rok Korošec

V4 Special Series Debrecen–Ibrány, Péter Kusztor

== National championship ==
2015
Slovenia Time Trial, Jan Tratnik

2016
Slovenia Road Race, Jan Tratnik
Slovakia Time Trial, Marek Canecky
Hungary Road Race, János Pelikán
Hungary Time Trial, János Pelikán

2017
Slovakia Time Trial, Marek Canecky
