= Andi Bajc =

Slovenian cyclist

Personal information
- Full name: Andi Bajc
- Born: 14 November 1988 (age 37): Šempeter pri Gorici, SR Slovenia, SFR Yugoslavia; (now Slovenia)
- Height: 1.78 m (5 ft 10 in)
- Weight: 64 kg (141 lb)

Cycling career
- Sport: Cycling
- Discipline: Road
- Role: Rider
- Rider type: All-rounder

Amateur team
- 2013: RSC Amplatz

Professional teams
- 2007–2010: Radenska–PowerBar
- 2011–2012: Manisaspor
- 2014–2018: Amplatz–BMC
- 2019–2022: Team Felbermayr–Simplon Wels

Andi Bajc (born 14 November 1988) is a Slovenian cyclist, who most recently rode for UCI Continental team Team Felbermayr–Simplon Wels.

== Major results ==
2010
4th Giro del Medio Brenta
9th ZLM Tour
2011
1st Stage 1 Tour of Trakya
5th Overall Tour of Alanya

1st Stage 2

7th Overall Tour of Gallipoli
2012
1st Mountains classification Tour of Trakya
2nd Mayor Cup
6th Ljubljana–Zagreb
7th Memorial Oleg Dyachenko
8th Poreč Trophy
2013
6th Central European Tour Miskolc GP
9th Croatia–Slovenia
9th Tour Bohemia
10th Banja Luka–Belgrade II
2014
3rd Visegrad 4 Bicycle Race – GP Slovakia
6th Overall Istrian Spring Trophy
7th Overall Oberösterreich Rundfahrt
9th Grand Prix Südkärnten
2015
1st Belgrade–Banja Luka II
2nd Overall Tour de Hongrie

1st Stage 4

2nd Raiffeisen Grand Prix
4th Overall Oberösterreich Rundfahrt
5th Croatia–Slovenia
2016
5th GP Laguna
7th Overall Istrian Spring Trophy
8th GP Adria Mobil
2017
6th Overall Okolo Jižních Čech
2018
4th V4 Special Series Debrecen–Ibrány
9th Visegrad 4 – Kerékpárverseny
2019
5th Croatia–Slovenia
7th GP Kranj
8th Overall Oberösterreich Rundfahrt
10th Poreč Trophy
2020
5th Poreč Trophy
2021
7th Poreč Trophy
10th GP Adria Mobil
10th GP Kranj
