= Jan Tratnik =

Slovenian cyclist (born 1990)

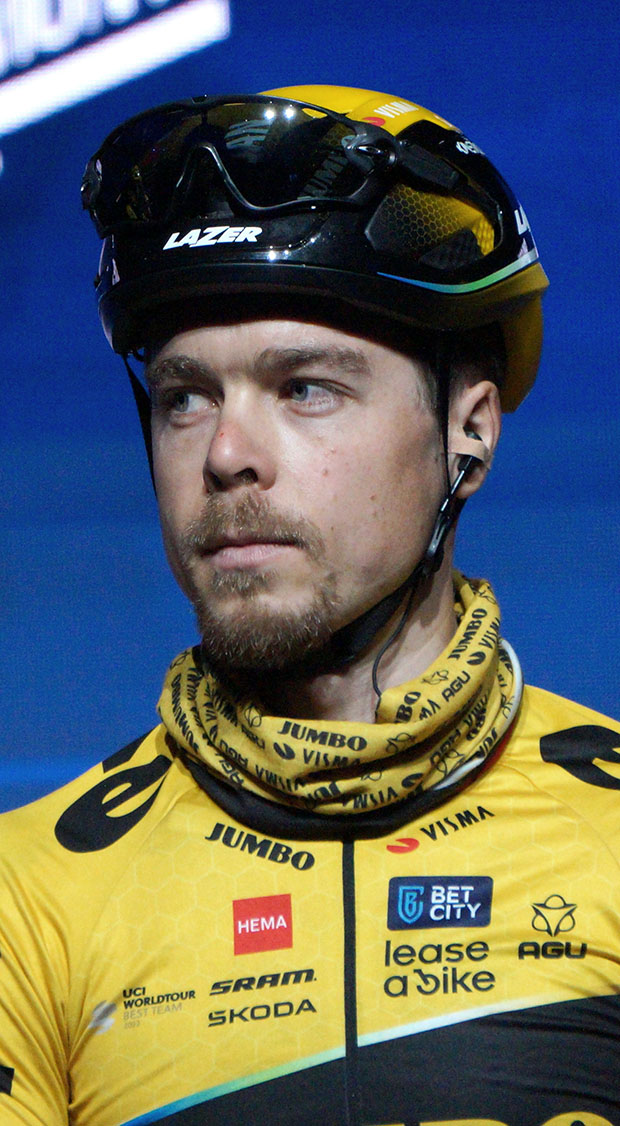
- Tratnik in 2023

Personal information
- Full name: Jan Tratnik
- Nickname: Syuk
- Born: 23 February 1990 (age 36) Ljubljana, SR Slovenia, Yugoslavia
- Height: 1.73 m (5 ft 8 in)
- Weight: 67 kg (148 lb)

Cycling career
- Sport: Cycling
- Current team: Red Bull–Bora–Hansgrohe
- Discipline: Road
- Role: Rider
- Rider type: Rouleur

Professional teams
- 2009–2010: Radenska–KD Financial Point
- 2011: Quick-Step
- 2012: Radenska
- 2013: Tirol Cycling Team
- 2014–2016: Amplatz–BMC
- 2017–2018: CCC–Sprandi–Polkowice
- 2019–2022: Bahrain–Merida
- 2023–2024: Team Jumbo–Visma
- 2025–: Red Bull–Bora–Hansgrohe

Major wins
- Grand Tours Giro d'Italia 1 individual stage (2020) One-day races and Classics National Road Race Championships (2016) National Time Trial Championships (2015, 2018, 2021, 2022) Omloop Het Nieuwsblad (2024)
Medal record
Representing Slovenia
European Road Championships
| Gold medal – first place | 2012 Goes | Under 23 road race |

Jan Tratnik (born 23 February 1990) is a Slovenian cyclist who rides for UCI WorldTeam Red Bull–Bora–Hansgrohe. Professional since 2009, he has won the 2024 Omloop Het Nieuwsblad and a stage of the 2020 Giro d'Italia. Tratnik is also a four time Slovenian national time trial champion and a one-time national road race champion.

== Career ==
=== Junior years (2007–2008) ===
Tratnik started cycling at the age of 17 on the advice of Borut Božič who noticed him during a mountain bike competition organized by his school. He found success in races during his second season as a junior in 2008, winning the national junior time trial championship and the Coppa Linari.

=== Under-23 years (2009–2012) ===
Moving up to the under-23 category, he was recruited by UCI Continental team Radenska–KD Financial Point, which he rode the 2009 and 2010 seasons for. With the team, he had his first victory at the under-23 level, winning the 2010 Gran Premio della Liberazione. He also finished second overall in the Giro delle Regioni, an event on the UCI Under 23 Nations' Cup calendar, and competed at the under-23 world championships both years. At the world championships, Tratnik placed 60th in the road race and 52nd in the time trial in 2009, and did not finish the road race in 2010.

The following season, Tratnik made the step up to the UCI World Tour with Quick-Step. However, he was let go at the end of the season after a lack of results, largely due to an eating disorder causing him to lose an unhealthy amount of weight, forcing him to rejoin Radenska in 2012. That season, he won the European under-23 road race championships in his final year as an under-23 rider.

=== Continental teams (2013–2016) ===
For the 2013 season, Tratnik again moved teams, this time to Austrian Continental squad Tirol Cycling Team. He once again struggled to find form and was involved in several crashes throughout the year.

In 2014, he transferred again, to another Austrian Continental team, Amplatz–BMC, on a three-year contract. Here he found success at a number of Continental Tour level events. In 2015, he won the Grand Prix Südkärnten, the second stage and the general classification of the East Bohemia Tour as well as the fifth stage and the points classification of the Tour de Hongrie. He also finished third in the fourth stage of the Tour of Austria and won the points classification. That same year, he won the elite national time trial championships and placed fourth in the road race. In 2016, his success continued, winning the elite national road race championship and the overall classification of the East Bohemia Tour.

=== CCC–Sprandi–Polkowice (2017–2018) ===
Tratnik's results for Amplatz–BMC caught the attention of Polish UCI Professional Continental team CCC–Sprandi–Polkowice, who signed him on a two-year contract starting in 2017. With the team, Tranik found his best form yet in his career. In 2017, he won the Okolo Slovenska and competed in his first Grand Tour: the Giro d'Italia. He also proved himself to be a strong time trialist, finishing 10th in the time trial at the UCI Road World Championships.

In his second season with the team, Tratnik maintained this form, winning the final stage of the Settimana Internazionale di Coppi e Bartali in Late, a time trial, followed by Volta Limburg Classic a week later. He also won his second national time trial championship and finished second overall in the Tour de Luxembourg among other results.

=== Bahrain–Merida: Return to the World Tour (2019–2022) ===
In 2019 Tratnik returned to the UCI World Tour after a seven year absence with his signing to Bahrain–Merida. In his first season with the team, Tratnik took his first ever World Tour victory, the prologue of the Tour de Romandie, and competed in his first Tour de France. The following March, Tratnik nearly won a stage of Paris–Nice but was caught with 200 meters remaining. However, in October, he took his biggest win in his career yet, winning stage 16 of the Giro d'Italia, six seconds ahead of Ben O'Connor.

In 2021, he won the national time trial championships a third time and defended his title again the following year. In 2022, he also placed ninth in the Dwars door Vlaanderen and Milan–San Remo. He also entered the Giro d'Italia, but suffered from a fracture to his right scaphoid during stage 1, forcing him to drop out two days later.

=== Team Jumbo–Visma (2023–2024) ===
In 2023, Tratnik moved to Team Jumbo–Visma. He was slated to ride the 2023 Giro d'Italia in support of Primož Roglič. However, the day before the race, he was hit by a car while doing recon for the time trial, breaking his kneecap in the process. He was able to return to training four weeks later, and competed in the Vuelta a España.

Tratnik started the 2024 season strong, taking his biggest one-day race victory yet: the Omloop Het Nieuwsblad in a two-man sprint against Nils Politt.

== Major results ==
2008
National Junior Championships

1st Time trial
3rd Road race

1st Coppa Linari
2nd Overall Po Stajerski
2009
3rd Time trial, National Under-23 Road Championships
5th Poreč Trophy
10th Overall Grand Prix du Portugal
2010
1st Gran Premio della Liberazione
2nd Overall Giro delle Regioni
3rd Road race, National Under-23 Road Championships
4th Overall Istrian Spring Trophy
2012
1st Road race, UEC European Under-23 Road Championships
2nd Time trial, National Under-23 Road Championships
4th Ronde van Vlaanderen Beloften
7th Trofeo Banca Popolare di Vicenza
9th Central European Tour Budapest GP
2014
1st GP Kranj
3rd Central European Tour Budapest GP
4th Overall Oberösterreich Rundfahrt
4th Central European Tour Košice–Miskolc
5th Banja Luka–Belgrade II
5th Raiffeisen Grand Prix
6th Poreč Trophy
7th Grand Prix Südkärnten
8th Visegrad 4 Bicycle Race – GP Slovakia
9th GP Izola
2015 (1 pro win)
National Road Championships

1st Time trial
4th Road race

1st Overall East Bohemia Tour

1st Stage 2

Tour de Hongrie

1st Points classification
1st Stage 5

1st Points classification, Tour of Austria
4th GP Adria Mobil
6th Visegrad 4 Bicycle Race – GP Slovakia
10th Belgrade Banjaluka I
2016 (1)
1st Road race, National Road Championships
1st Overall East Bohemia Tour

1st Points classification
1st Stage 2

1st Points classification, Istrian Spring Trophy
1st Mountains classification, Tour of Slovenia
2nd Poreč Trophy
3rd Rudi Altig Race
7th Overall Okolo Slovenska

1st Stage 5

9th GP Izola
2017 (2)
1st Overall Okolo Slovenska

1st Points classification
1st Prologue

1st Stage 1b (TTT) Settimana Internazionale di Coppi e Bartali
3rd Overall Czech Cycling Tour
4th Road race, National Road Championships
8th Overall Volta ao Alentejo
10th Time trial, UCI Road World Championships
2018 (3)
National Road Championships

1st Time trial
4th Road race

1st Volta Limburg Classic
1st Stage 4 (ITT) Settimana Internazionale di Coppi e Bartali
2nd Overall Tour de Luxembourg
2nd Overall Okolo Slovenska
3rd Overall CCC Tour - Grody Piastowskie

1st Stage 1 (ITT)

5th Brabantse Pijl
9th Eschborn–Frankfurt
2019 (1)
1st Prologue Tour de Romandie
3rd Time trial, National Road Championships
8th Chrono des Nations
2020 (1)
1st Stage 16 Giro d'Italia
6th Time trial, UEC European Road Championships
2021 (1)
National Road Championships

1st Time trial
4th Road race

2022 (1)
1st Time trial, National Road Championships
9th Milan–San Remo
9th Dwars door Vlaanderen
2023
1st Stage 3 (TTT) Paris–Nice
1st Stage 2 (TTT) Vuelta a Burgos
9th Coppa Bernocchi
2024 (1)
1st Omloop Het Nieuwsblad
2nd Vuelta a Murcia
3rd Overall Volta ao Algarve
3rd Clásica Jaén Paraíso Interior
8th Road race, Olympic Games
Combativity award Stage 10 Giro d'Italia

=== Grand Tour general classification results timeline ===
| Grand Tour | 2017 | 2018 | 2019 | 2020 | 2021 | 2022 | 2023 | 2024 |
|---|---|---|---|---|---|---|---|---|
| Giro d'Italia | 106 | — | — | 62 | 70 | DNF | — | 34 |
| Tour de France | — | — | 93 | — | — | 72 | — | 64 |
| Vuelta a España | — | — | — | — | 94 | — | 38 | — |

=== Classics results timeline ===
| Monument | 2017 | 2018 | 2019 | 2020 | 2021 | 2022 | 2023 | 2024 | 2025 |
|---|---|---|---|---|---|---|---|---|---|
| Milan–San Remo | — | — | — | — | 134 | 9 | 91 | — | |
| Tour of Flanders | — | — | 87 | — | — | 12 | — | — | |
| Paris–Roubaix | — | — | 86 | NH | — | — | — | — | |
| Liège–Bastogne–Liège | — | — | — | — | — | — | 25 | — | |
| Giro di Lombardia | — | — | — | — | — | — | 47 | — | |
| Classic | 2017 | 2018 | 2019 | 2020 | 2021 | 2022 | 2023 | 2024 | 2025 |
| Omloop Het Nieuwsblad | — | — | — | — | — | — | 94 | 1 | |
| Strade Bianche | — | — | 37 | DNF | 82 | 37 | — | — | |
| E3 Saxo Bank Classic | — | — | DNF | NH | — | — | — | 32 | |
| Gent–Wevelgem | — | — | DNF | — | — | — | — | DNF | |
| Dwars door Vlaanderen | — | — | 33 | NH | — | 9 | — | DNF | |
| Brabantse Pijl | 35 | 5 | 92 | — | — | DNF | — | — | |
| Amstel Gold Race | 89 | — | DNF | NH | 47 | 12 | — | — | |
| Eschborn–Frankfurt | 33 | 9 | — | NH | — | — | — | — | |

Legend
| — | Did not compete |
| DNF | Did not finish |
| IP | In progress |
