= Rund um Sebnitz =

Cycling race in Germany

Race details
- Date: September–October
- Region: Germany
- English name: Tour of Sebnitz
- Discipline: Road
- Competition: UCI Europe Tour
- Type: One day race
- Web site: www.rundumsebnitz.de

History
- First edition: 1954
- Editions: 41 (as of 2015)
- First winner: Helmut Stolper (RDA)
- Most recent: Maximilian Kuen (AUT)

The Rund um Sebnitz is a one-day cycling race held annually in Sebnitz. It has been part of UCI Europe Tour since 2015 in category 1.2.

== Winners ==
- 1954 (East Germany) Helmut Stolper
- 1955 (East Germany) Horst Tüller
- 1956 (East Germany) Peter Härtel
- 1957 (West Germany) Otto Altweck
- 1958 (Belgium) René Vanderveken
- 1959 (East Germany) Klaus Ampler
- 1960 (Netherlands) Aad Biemans
- 1961 (East Germany) Gustav Adolf Schur
- 1962 (East Germany) Eberhard Butzke
- 1963 (Belgium) Eddy Merckx
- 1964 (East Germany) Kurt Müller
- 1965 (Italy) Gianfranco Gallon
- 1966 (East Germany) Dieter Mickein
- 1967 (East Germany) Rainer Marks
- 1968 no race
- 1969 (East Germany) Axel Peschel
- 1970 (East Germany) Dieter Gonschoreck
- 1971 (Belgium) Louis Verreydt
- 1972 (Czechoslovakia) Ludek Kubias
- 1973 (Czechoslovakia) Ludek Kubias
- 1974 (East Germany) Lothar Grüner
- 1975–1989 no race
- 1990 (Colombia) Ángel Lamargo
- 1991–1994 no race
- 1994 (Germany) Ralf Keller
- 1995 (Germany) Jürgen Werner
- 1996 (Germany) Martin Müller
- 1997 (Germany) Uwe Ampler
- 1998 (Germany) Michael Giebelmann
- 1999 (Germany) Timo Scholz
- 2000 (Germany) Torsten Hiekmann
- 2001 (Germany) Tilo Schüler
- 2002 no race
- 2003 (Germany) Paul Martens
- 2004 (Germany) Udo Müller
- 2005 (Germany) Karsten Volkmann
- 2006 (Germany) Erik Mohs
- 2007 (Germany) Erik Mohs
- 2008 (Slovakia) Martin Prázdnovský
- 2009 (Germany) René Obst
- 2010 (Germany) Jens Voigt
- 2011 (Germany) Christian Knees
- 2012 (Germany) Stefan Schäfer
- 2013 no race
- 2014 (Slovenia) Andi Bajc
- 2015 (Austria) Maximilian Kuen
