= Julien Mortier =

Belgian cyclist

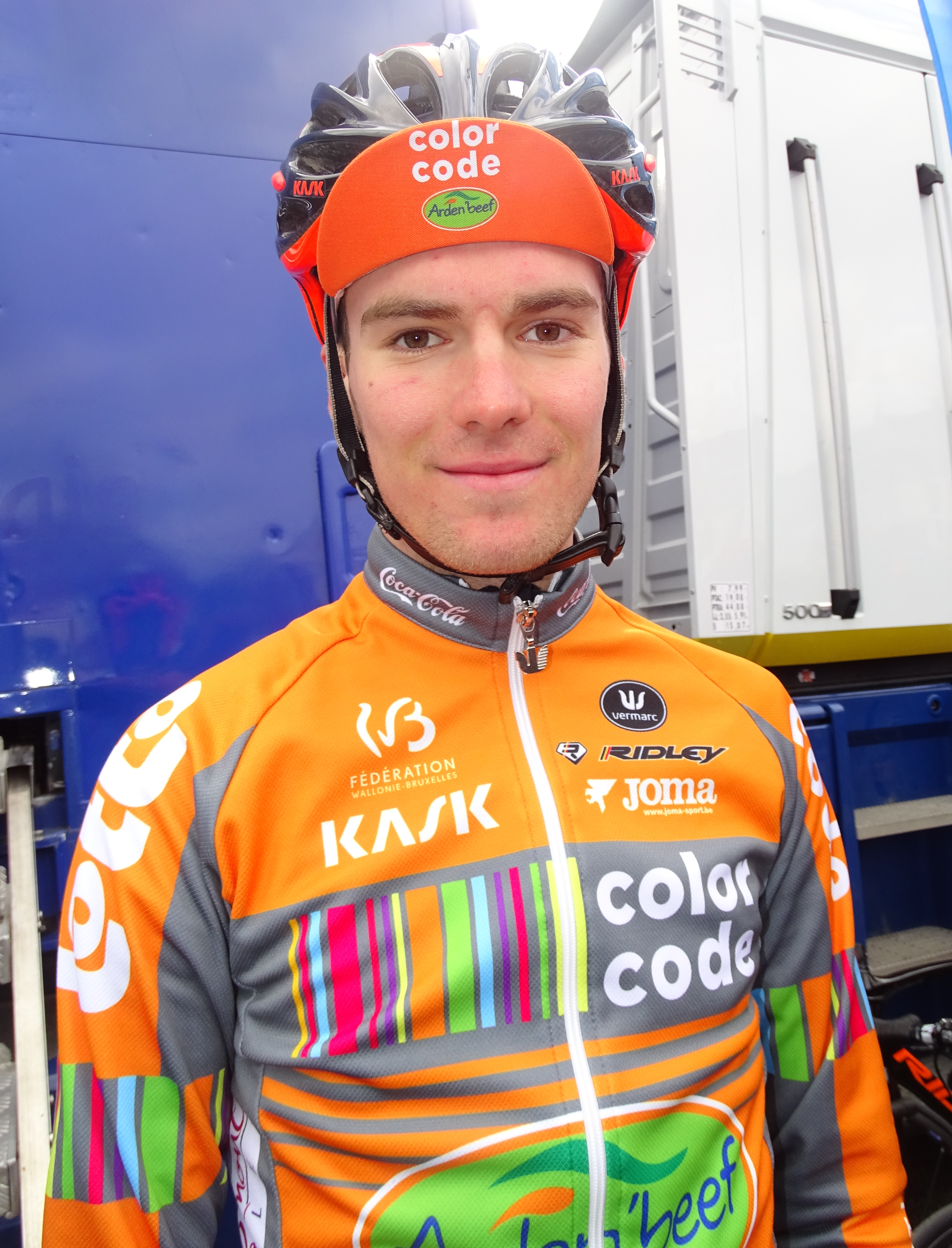
- Mortier in 2016.

Personal information
- Full name: Julien Mortier
- Born: 20 July 1997 (age 29) Tournai, Belgium
- Height: 1.83 m (6 ft 0 in)
- Weight: 66 kg (146 lb)

Cycling career
- Sport: Cycling
- Current team: US Lamentin
- Discipline: Road
- Role: Rider

Amateur teams
- 2017: WB Veranclassic Aqua Protect (stagiaire)
- 2021: Dunkerque Grand Littoral–Cofidis
- 2023–: US Lamentin

Professional teams
- 2016–2017: Color Code–Arden'Beef
- 2018–2020: WB Aqua Protect Veranclassic

Julien Mortier (born 20 July 1997 in Tournai) is a Belgian cyclist, who currently rides for French amateur team US Lamentin.

== Major results ==
2016
7th Grand Prix des Marbriers
8th Circuit de Wallonie
2017
5th Road race, National Under-23 Road Championships
6th Paris–Tours Espoirs
8th Druivenkoers Overijse
9th Liège–Bastogne–Liège U23
2019
4th Paris–Troyes
2020
6th Grand Prix de la Ville de Lillers
