= Maximilian Kuen =

Austrian cyclist

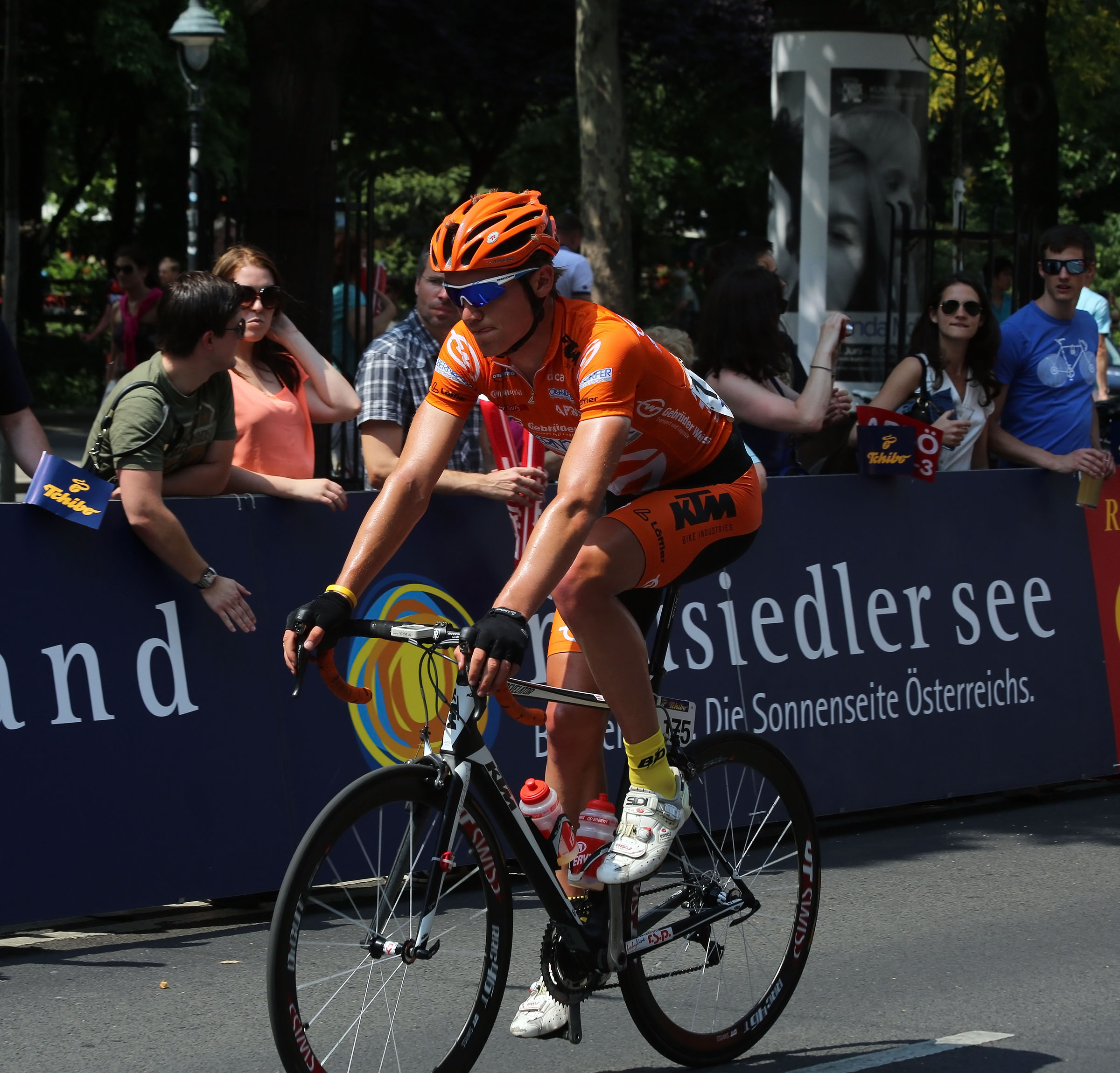
- Kuen in 2013.

Personal information
- Full name: Maximilian Kuen
- Born: 26 May 1992 (age 34) Kufstein, Austria

Cycling career
- Sport: Cycling
- Current team: Retired
- Discipline: Road
- Role: Rider

Professional teams
- 2011–2013: Tyrol Team
- 2013–2014: Arbö–Gebrüder Weiss–Oberndorfer
- 2015–2016: Amplatz–BMC
- 2017: Tirol Cycling Team
- 2018: My Bike–Stevens
- 2019–2021: Team Vorarlberg Santic

Maximilian Kuen (born 26 May 1992) is an Austrian former professional cyclist, who rode professionally between 2011 and 2021 for the Gebrüder Weiss–Oberndorfer, Tirol Cycling Team, My Bike–Stevens and Team Vorarlberg squads.

== Major results ==
2009
3rd Time trial, National Junior Road Championships
2010
1st Time trial, National Junior Road Championships
1st Junior race, National Hill Climb Championships
2013
8th Road race, UEC European Under-23 Road Championships
2014
2nd Road race, National Under-23 Road Championships
2015
1st Rund um Sebnitz
1st Mountains classification Flèche du Sud
2nd National Criterium Championships
5th Overall East Bohemia Tour
2016
10th Visegrad 4 Bicycle Race – Kerékpárverseny
2017
5th Croatia–Slovenia
2018
1st Mountains classification Grand Prix Cycliste de Gemenc
2019
6th Raiffeisen Grand Prix
