= Manuel Porzner =

German cyclist (born 1996)

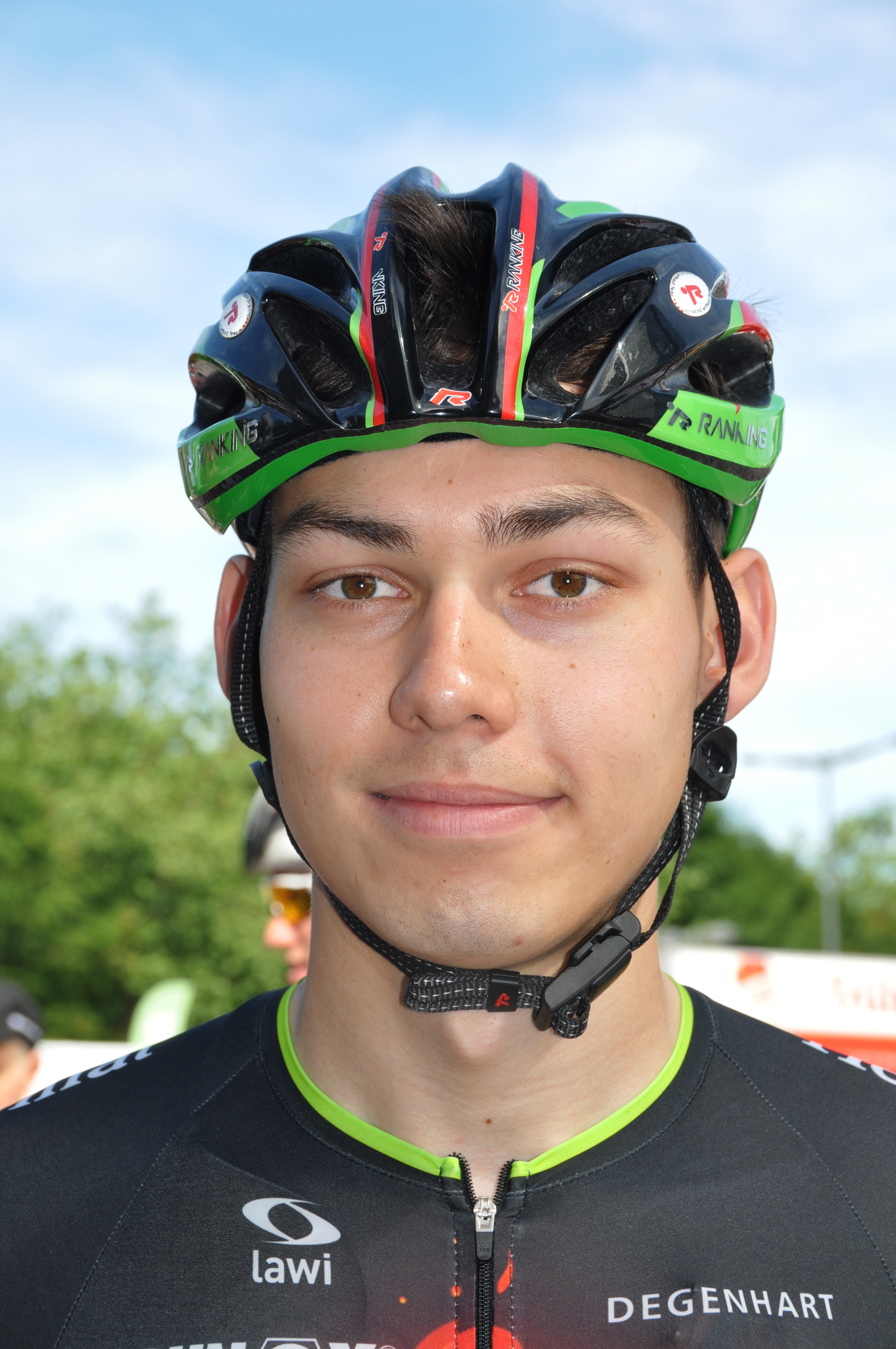
- Porzner in 2017

Personal information
- Full name: Manuel Porzner
- Born: 25 February 1996 (age 30) Ansbach, Germany
- Height: 1.8 m (5 ft 11 in)
- Weight: 75 kg (165 lb)

Cycling career
- Sport: Cycling
- Current team: RSG Ansbach
- Discipline: Road
- Role: Rider

Amateur teams
- 2006–2014: RSG Ansbach
- 2013–2014: Team Auto Eder Bayern
- 2019–: RSG Ansbach

Professional teams
- 2015: Team Stölting
- 2016: Team Vorarlberg
- 2017: Team Heizomat
- 2018: Tirol Cycling Team
- 2019: Herrmann Radteam

Manuel Porzner (born 25 February 1996) is a German racing cyclist, who currently rides for German amateur team RSG Ansbach. He rode for Tirol Cycling Team in the men's team time trial event at the 2018 UCI Road World Championships.

== Major results ==
2013
6th Overall Internationale Niedersachsen-Rundfahrt

1st Stage 4

2014
3rd Overall Sint-Martinusprijs Kontich

1st Points classification

8th Trofeo comune di Vertova
2015
Tour de Hongrie

1st Prologue & Stage 3

2017
3rd Time trial, National Under-23 Road Championships
2018
5th GP Kranj
7th Croatia–Slovenia
