= 2011 UCI Road World Championships – Women's time trial =

Women's time trial
2011 UCI Road World Championships
- Rainbow jersey

Race details
- Dates: 20 September 2011
- Stages: 1
- Distance: 27.8 km (17.3 mi)
- Winning time: 37' 07"

Medalists
	Gold	Judith Arndt (GER)
	Silver	Linda Villumsen (NZL)
	Bronze	Emma Pooley (GBR)

The Women's time trial of the 2011 UCI Road World Championships cycling event took place on 20 September 2011 in Copenhagen, Denmark.

After three previous silver medals in the event, Germany's Judith Arndt took her first gold medal in the damp conditions, recording a time 21 seconds quicker than any of her rivals. New Zealand's Linda Villumsen improved upon her two previous bronze medals to finish second, and the reigning world champion Emma Pooley completed the podium, 2.4 seconds behind Villumsen.

== Route ==
The riders completed two laps on a 13.9 km (8.6 mi) course in the centre of Copenhagen, for a total length of 27.8 km (17.3 mi).

== Final classification ==
Rank	Rider	Country	Time
1	Judith Arndt	Germany	37' 07"
2	Linda Villumsen	New Zealand	+ 21"
3	Emma Pooley	United Kingdom	+ 24"
4	Tara Whitten	Canada	+ 26"
5	Clara Hughes	Canada	+ 36"
6	Ellen van Dijk	Netherlands	+ 38"
7	Rhae-Christie Shaw	Canada	+ 39"
8	Amber Neben	United States	+ 41"
9	Emilia Fahlin	Sweden	+ 55"
10	Marianne Vos	Netherlands	+ 55"
11	Ina-Yoko Teutenberg	Germany	+ 56"
12	Shara Gillow	Australia	+ 1' 00"
13	Elena Tchalykh	Azerbaijan	+ 1' 00"
14	Emma Johansson	Sweden	+ 1' 01"
15	Evelyn Stevens	United States	+ 1' 21"
16	Olga Zabelinskaya	Russia	+ 1' 25"
17	Julia Shaw	United Kingdom	+ 1' 49"
18	Noemi Cantele	Italy	+ 1' 58"
19	Pascale Schnider	Switzerland	+ 1' 58"
20	Pia Sundstedt	Finland	+ 2' 01"
21	Mélodie Lesueur	France	+ 2' 04"
22	Aleksandra Sošenko	Lithuania	+ 2' 08"
23	Olena Pavlukhina	Ukraine	+ 2' 19"
24	Latoya Brulee	Belgium	+ 2' 29"
25	Grete Treier	Estonia	+ 2' 33"
26	Leire Olaberria	Spain	+ 2' 42"
27	Christel Ferrier-Bruneau	France	+ 2' 45"
28	Martina Sáblíková	Czech Republic	+ 2' 57"
29	Alexandra Burchenkova	Russia	+ 3' 01"
30	Ashleigh Moolman	South Africa	+ 3' 07"
31	Taryn Heather	Australia	+ 3' 08"
32	Elisa Longo Borghini	Italy	+ 3' 13"
33	Michelle Lauge Jensen	Denmark	+ 3' 19"
34	Tjaša Rutar	Slovenia	+ 3' 20"
35	Eneritz Iturriaga Echevarri	Spain	+ 3' 28"
36	Alena Amialiusik	Belarus	+ 3' 29"
37	Kataržina Sosna	Lithuania	+ 3' 33"
38	Liesbet De Vocht	Belgium	+ 3' 44"
39	Valeria Müller	Argentina	+ 3' 52"
40	Nontasin Chanpeng	Thailand	+ 3' 59"
41	Tetyana Ryabchenko	Ukraine	+ 4' 00"
42	Verónica Leal Balderas	Mexico	+ 4' 07"
43	Alenka Novak	Slovenia	+ 4' 12"
44	Kathryn Bertine	Saint Kitts and Nevis	+ 4' 17"
45	Monrudee Chapookam	Thailand	+ 4' 21"
46	Jacqueline Hahn	Austria	+ 4' 48"
47	Dinah Chan	Singapore	+ 4' 56"
48	Yelena Antonova	Kazakhstan	+ 5' 21"
49	Martina Růžičková	Czech Republic	+ 5' 46"
50	Seba Al-Raai	Syria	+ 9' 40"
51	Claire Fraser	Guyana	+ 9' 45"
