= Slovenian National Time Trial Championships =

National road cycling championship in Slovenia

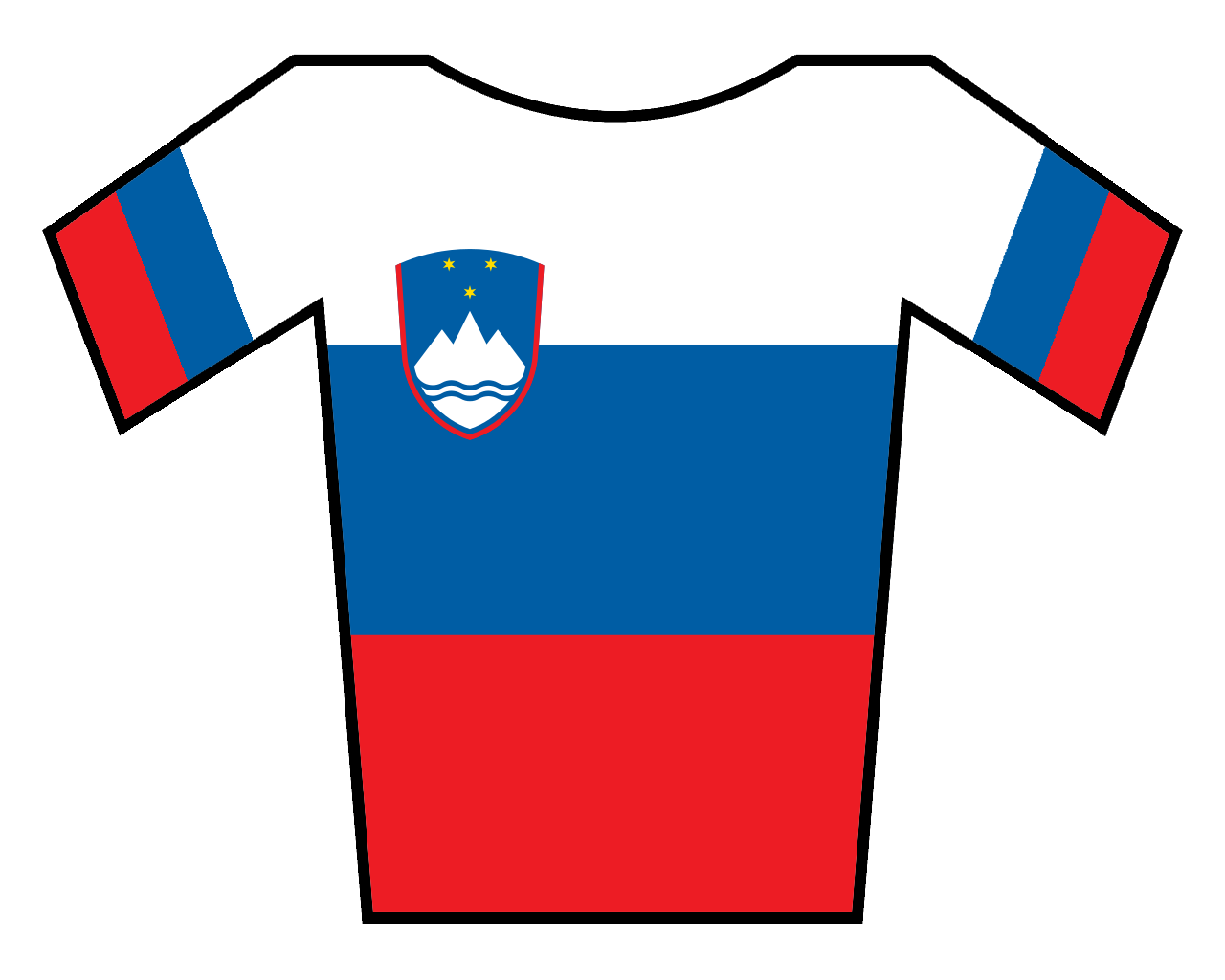

Race details
- Date: June
- Discipline: Time Trial
- Competition: National Championships
- Type: One day time trial race
- Organiser: Different clubs

History
- First edition: 13 October 1991
- Editions: 33 (men), 25 (women)
- First winner: Marko Baloh (M); Kristan (W)
- Most wins: 5x – Gregor Gazvoda (M); 5x – Tjaša Rutar (W)
- Most recent: Primož Roglič (M); Nika Bobnar (W)

The Slovenian National Time Trial Championships have been held since 1991.

Kristijan Koren (U23 category) set the best time in 2006 and 2007 Championships and beat all top riders (Elite), and repeated his successes at the National Time Trials and Road Race in 2009. The Slovenian Cycling Federation later issued a rule change so that U23 results counted only in their own category. After 2010, the potential U23 winner by time would become the absolute champion.

== Statistics ==
=== Multiple champions ===
Riders that managed to win the Elite race more than once.

Titles	Men	Years
5	Gregor Gazvoda	2005, 2007, 2008, 2010, 2014
4	Jan Tratnik	2015, 2018, 2021, 2022
3	Robert Pintarič	1994, 1995, 1996
3	Tadej Pogačar	2019, 2020, 2023
2	Saša Sviben	1993, 1997
2	Mitja Mahorič	2001, 2003
2	Janez Brajkovič	2009, 2011
2	Primož Roglič	2016, 2026
Titles	Women	Years
5	Tjaša Rutar	2008, 2009, 2010, 2011, 2012
4	Urška Žigart	2020, 2022, 2023, 2024
4	Eugenia Bujak	2018, 2019, 2021, 2025
2	Minka Logonder	1995, 1996
2	Urša Pintar	2016, 2017

=== Hosts ===
Host	Men
8	Ljubljana
8	Solkan
2	Kranj
2	Pokljuka
2	Karteljevo
1	Nova Gorica
1	Novo mesto
1	Ptuj
1	Koper
1	Atomske toplice
1	Kozje
1	Zagreb
1	Lenart
1	Tišina
1	Trebnje
1	Celje

Host	Women
8	Ljubljana
6	Solkan
2	Pokljuka
2	Karteljevo
1	Kranj
1	Nova Gorica
1	Novo mesto
1	Kozje
1	Koper
1	Trebnje
1	Celje

== Elite ==
=== Men ===
Map of hosts of all Time Trial Championships since 1991

Gregor Gazvoda	Jan Tratnik
100x	100x
5 titles	4 titles

Tadej Pogačar	Primož Roglič
100x	100x
3 titles	2 titles

Date	Host	Length	Champion	Runner-up	3rd place
13 October 1991	Nova Gorica	40.8 km	Marko Baloh (Merx Celje)	Sandi Papež (KD Krka)	Igor Bertoncelj (Sava Kranj)
1992	Men's Slovenian National Time Trial not held				
16 October 1993	Atom. toplice	42 km	Saša Sviben (KD Krka)	Robert Pintarič (Rog Ljubljana)	Marko Baloh (Rog Ljubljana)
9 October 1994	Kozje	44 km	Robert Pintarič (Rog Ljubljana)	Borut Rovšček (Sava Kranj)	Saša Sviben (Rog Ljubljana)
3 June 1995	Kranj	40 km	Robert Pintarič (Rog Ljubljana)	Brane Ugrenovič (KD Krka)	Boris Premužič (Rog Ljubljana)
29 June 1996	Novo mesto	22.7 km	Robert Pintarič (Rog Ljubljana)	Saša Sviben (Rog Ljubljana)	Boris Premužič (Rog Ljubljana)
27 September 1997	Kranj	40 km	Saša Sviben (Radenska Rog)	Robert Pintarič (Radenska Rog)	Valter Bonča (Radenska Rog)
1998	Men's Slovenian National Time Trial not held				
25 June 1999	Ptuj	48.6 km	Branko Filip (Gerolsteiner)	Saša Sviben (Perutnina Ptuj Radenska Rog)	Kristjan Mugerli (De Nardi–Pasta Montegrappa)
(Note: Zagreb (2000) – hosted common men's Croatian/Slovenian National Time Trial Championships.)22 June 2000	Zagreb	n/a	Valter Bonča (Bosch Hausgeräte)	Mitja Mahorič (KRKA–Telekom Slovenije)	Igor Kranjec (KRKA–Telekom Slovenije)
29 June 2001	Lenart	36.5 km	Mitja Mahorič (KRKA–Telekom Slovenije)	Saša Sviben (Stabil-Steiermark)	Boris Premužič (KRKA–Telekom Slovenije)
2002	Men's Slovenian National Time Trial not held				
27 June 2003	Tišina	40 km	Mitja Mahorič (Perutnina Ptuj)	Valter Bonča (Perutnina Ptuj)	Dean Podgornik (Perutnina Ptuj)
25 June 2004	Solkan	37 km	Dean Podgornik (Tenax)	Gregor Gazvoda (Perutnina Ptuj)	Boris Premužič (Sava Kranj)
19 June 2005	Solkan	36.4 km	Gregor Gazvoda (Perutnina Ptuj)	Valter Bonča (Sava)	Dean Podgornik (Tenax–Nobili Rubinetterie)
(Note: Solkan (2006) – Kristjan Koren (U23) was absolute winner by time, but Kristjan Fajt was the best in Elite category.)8 October 2006	Solkan	37.6 km	Kristjan Fajt (Radenska–PowerBar)	David Tratnik (Radenska–PowerBar)	Matej Gnezda (Radenska–PowerBar)
(Note: Solkan (2007) – Kristjan Koren (U23) was absolute winner by time, but Gregor Gazvoda was the best in Elite category.)25 June 2007	Solkan	37.9 km	Gregor Gazvoda (Perutnina Ptuj)	Matej Mugerli (Liquigas)	Dean Podgornik (MapaMap-BantProfi)
25 June 2008	Solkan	37.9 km	Gregor Gazvoda (Perutnina Ptuj)	Kristjan Koren (Perutnina Ptuj)	Jure Zrimšek (Adria Mobil)
(Note: Solkan (2009) – Blaž Jarc set absolute second best time, but he was only competing in U23 category.)25 June 2009	Solkan	37.9 km	Janez Brajkovič (Astana)	Gregor Gazvoda (EQA–Meitan Hompo–Graphite)	Kristjan Koren (Bottoli Nordelettrica Ramonda)
25 June 2010	Solkan	36.7 km	Gregor Gazvoda (Arbö KTM–Gebrüder Weiss)	Kristjan Koren (Liquigas–Doimo)	Borut Božič (Vacansoleil)
26 June 2011	Solkan	37.9 km	Janez Brajkovič (Team RadioShack)	Robert Vrečer (Obrazi Delo Revije)	(Note: Solkan (2011) – Koren was third. All his results from this and the following year were subsequently annulled and deleted in 2019 due to doping.) (result annulled in 2019)
8 June 2012	Ljubljana	37.4 km	Robert Vrečer (Team Vorarlberg)	Gregor Gazvoda (Ag2r–La Mondiale)	Jan Polanc (Radenska)
7 June 2013	Ljubljana	37.2 km	Klemen Štimulak (Adria Mobil)	Matej Mugerli (Adria Mobil)	Kristjan Fajt (Adria Mobil)
6 June 2014	Ljubljana	36 km	Gregor Gazvoda (Gebrüder Weiss–Oberndorfer)	Klemen Štimulak (Adria Mobil)	Blaž Jarc (NetApp–Endura)
12 June 2015	Ljubljana	44 km	Jan Tratnik (Amplatz–BMC)	Klemen Štimulak (Adria Mobil)	Gregor Gazvoda (Kinan Cycling Team)
10 June 2016	Ljubljana	44 km	Primož Roglič (LottoNL–Jumbo)	Matej Mohorič (Lampre–Merida)	Rok Korošec (Radenska–Ljubljana)
9 June 2017	Ljubljana	44 km	Jan Polanc (UAE Team Emirates)	Gregor Gazvoda (Adria Mobil)	Izidor Penko (Rog–Ljubljana)
8 June 2018	Ljubljana	44 km	Jan Tratnik (CCC–Sprandi–Polkowice)	Tadej Pogačar (UAE Team Emirates)	Izidor Penko (Ljubljana Gusto Xaurum)
7 June 2019	Ljubljana	44 km	Tadej Pogačar (UAE Team Emirates)	Matej Mohorič (Bahrain–Merida)	Jan Tratnik (Bahrain–Merida)
28 June 2020	Pokljuka	15.7 km	Tadej Pogačar (UAE Team Emirates)	Primož Roglič (Team Jumbo–Visma)	Jan Polanc (UAE Team Emirates)
17 June 2021	Koper	31.5 km	Jan Tratnik (Team Bahrain Victorious)	Jan Polanc (UAE Team Emirates)	Tadej Pogačar (UAE Team Emirates)
(Note: Karteljevo (2022) – Time Trials were originally scheduled in Maribor (the same as Road Championships host), but in last minute rescheduled to Karteljevo. At the same time with Slovenian National Championships in time trials, Austrian National Time Trials were also held at Karteljevo.)23 June 2022	Karteljevo	28.8 km	Jan Tratnik (Team Bahrain Victorious)	Matej Mohorič (Team Bahrain Victorious)	Jan Polanc (UAE Team Emirates)
22 June 2023	Pokljuka	15.7 km	Tadej Pogačar (UAE Team Emirates)	Marko Pavlič (mebloJOGI Pro-concrete)	Anže Skok (Ljubljana Gusto Santic)
20 June 2024	Trebnje	30.1 km	Matej Mohorič (Team Bahrain Victorious)	Matevž Govekar (Team Bahrain Victorious)	Jaka Primožič (Hrinkow Advarics)
27 June 2025	Celje	29 km	Mihael Štajnar (Pogi Team Gusto Ljubljana)	Matic Žumer (Adria Mobil)	Timotej Bavec (KK Ribno Alpine Resort Bled)
26 June 2026	Karteljevo	28.8 km	Primož Roglič (Red Bull–Bora–Hansgrohe)	Roman Jermakov (Team Bahrain Victorious)	Jakob Omrzel (Team Bahrain Victorious)

=== Women ===
Tjaša Rutar	Urška Žigart	Eugenia Bujak
100x	60x	100x
5 titles	4 titles	4 titles

Date	Host	Length	Champion	Runner-up	3rd place
13 October 1991	Nova Gorica	13.6 km	Kristan (AS Astra VT)	Marjeta Sajevec (KD Krka)	Marija Trobec (KK Soča)
1992 – 1993	Women's Slovenian National Time Trials not held				
9 October 1994	Kozje	16.5 km	Vida Uršič (Stop Team)	Minka Logonder (Proloco Scott)	Marjeta Sajevec (KD Krka)
3 June 1995	Kranj	20 km	Minka Logonder (Proloco Scott)	Krebs (Avs)	Vida Uršič (Stop Team)
29 June 1996	Novo mesto	14 km	Minka Logonder (Proloco Scott)	Vida Uršič (Stop Team)	Marjeta Sajevec (KD Krka)
1997 – 2005	Women's Slovenian National Time Trials not held				
8 October 2006	Solkan	13 km	Katja Šorli (Brda Dobrovo)	Jelka Rakuš (Bambi AU2)	Maja Štangelj (Adria Mobil)
(Note: Solkan (2007) – only one competitor was on start list in Women's category.)25 June 2007	Solkan	18 km	Jelka Rakuš (Bam.bi BI-A2U)		
25 June 2008	Solkan	18 km	Tjaša Rutar (KK Postojna)	Katja Šorli (KD Brda Dobrovo)	Ajda Opeka (KK Postojna)
25 June 2009	Solkan	18 km	Tjaša Rutar (Klub Polet Garmin)	Polona Batagelj (Pedale Castellano)	Alenka Novak (Klub Polet Garmin)
25 June 2010	Solkan	18 km	Tjaša Rutar (Klub Polet Garmin)	Sigrid Corneo (Top Girls Fassa Bortolo)	Polona Batagelj (Bizkaia–Durango)
26 June 2011	Solkan	18 km	Tjaša Rutar (Klub Polet Garmin)	Polona Batagelj (Bizkaia–Durango)	Alenka Novak (Klub Polet Garmin)
8 June 2012	Ljubljana	18.6 km	Tjaša Rutar (Klub Polet Garmin)	Urša Pintar (Klub Polet Garmin)	Sara Frece (Klub Polet Garmin)
7 June 2013	Ljubljana	18 km	Sara Frece (E.Leclerc–Klub Polet)	Polona Batagelj (Diadora–Pasta Zara)	Alenka Novak (E.Leclerc–Klub Polet)
6 June 2014	Ljubljana	18 km	Polona Batagelj (BTC City Ljubljana)	Sara Frece (BTC City Ljubljana)	Tjaša Rutar (BTC City Ljubljana)
12 June 2015	Ljubljana	22 km	Polona Batagelj (BTC City Ljubljana)	Alenka Novak (BTC City Ljubljana)	Urša Pintar (BTC City Ljubljana)
10 June 2016	Ljubljana	22 km	Urša Pintar (BTC City Ljubljana)	Alenka Novak (n/a)	Urška Žigart (BTC City Ljubljana)
9 June 2017	Ljubljana	21.2 km	Urša Pintar (BTC City Ljubljana)	Polona Batagelj (BTC City Ljubljana)	Alenka Novak (Adria Mobil)
8 June 2018	Ljubljana	22 km	Eugenia Bujak (BTC City Ljubljana)	Urša Pintar (BTC City Ljubljana)	Polona Batagelj (BTC City Ljubljana)
7 June 2019	Ljubljana	22 km	Eugenia Bujak (BTC City Ljubljana)	Urša Pintar (BTC City Ljubljana)	Urška Žigart (BTC City Ljubljana)
28 June 2020	Pokljuka	15.7 km	Urška Žigart (Alé BTC Ljubljana)	Blaža Klemenčič (Habitat Mountainbike Team)	Urška Bravec (Alé BTC Ljubljana)
17 June 2021	Koper	21.2 km	Eugenia Bujak (Alé BTC Ljubljana)	Urša Pintar (Alé BTC Ljubljana)	Urška Žigart (Team BikeExchange)
23 June 2022	Karteljevo	14.4 km	Urška Žigart (Team BikeExchange–Jayco)	Eugenia Bujak (UAE Team ADQ)	Urša Pintar (UAE Team ADQ)
22 June 2023	Pokljuka	15.7 km	Urška Žigart (Team Jayco–AlUla)	Urša Pintar (BTC City Ljubljana Scott)	Nika Bobnar (BTC City Ljubljana Scott)
20 June 2024	Trebnje	20 km	Urška Žigart (Liv AlUla Jayco)	Hana Žumer (BTC City Ljubljana Zhiraf Amb)	Ema Pirš (BTC City Ljubljana Zhiraf Amb)
27 June 2025	Celje	21.7 km	Eugenia Bujak (Cofidis)	Urška Žigart (AG Insurance–Soudal)	Vita Movrin
26 June 2026	Karteljevo	14.4 km	Nika Bobnar (Nexetis)	Zoja Ferlež (Torelli)	Dominika Štrukelj (B. to Win BTC City Ljubljana)

== See also ==
- Slovenian National Road Race Championships
- National Road Cycling Championships
