= Operation Aderlass =

Doping investigation

Operation Aderlass (English: Operation Bloodletting) was an investigation in Austria and Germany into doping practices carried out by Erfurt-based German physician Mark Schmidt. Athletes from various disciplines were named as alleged customers of Schmidt's, receiving illegal blood transfusion for the purpose of enhancing performances, with several of them later confessing. The investigation centred around athletes from cross-country skiing and cycling.

The investigation was sparked following a confession by cross-country skier Johannes Dürr in early 2019, leading to arrests and raids in both Schmidt's Erfurt offices as well as during the FIS Nordic World Ski Championships 2019. Over the following months, prominent athletes such as cyclists Alessandro Petacchi and Danilo Hondo were charged with having used Schmidt's services for the purposes of doping. The investigations concluded with a prison sentence for main defendant Schmidt in January 2021.

== History ==
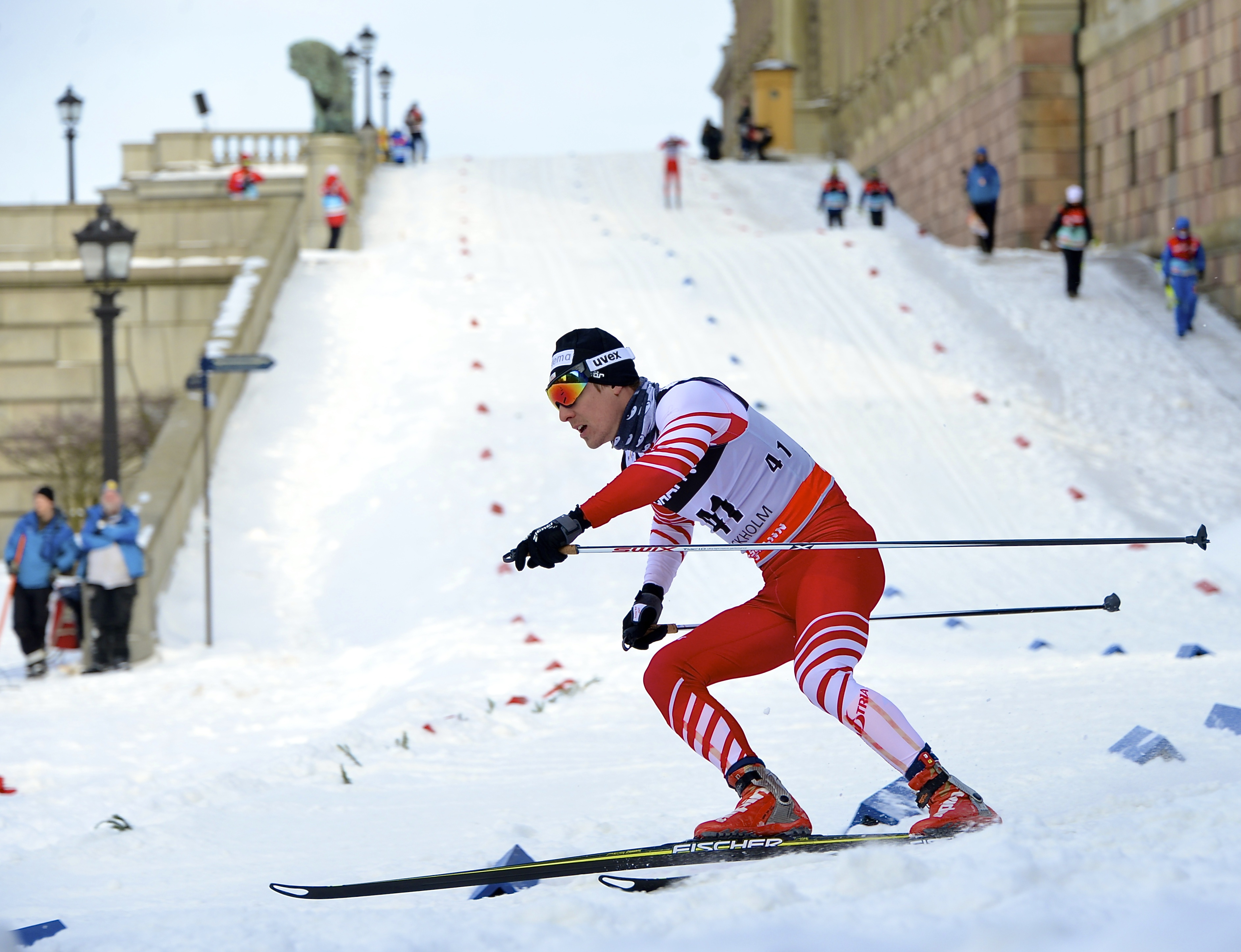
Admissions by cross-country skier Johannes Dürr led to the investigations

The case first came to light through admissions by cross-country skier Johannes Dürr in late February 2019. He named Mark Schmidt, a physician based in the German city of Erfurt, as the head of an operation which carried out systematic blood doping. Schmidt had earlier been team doctor at the Gerolsteiner cycling team. In October 2009, Bernhard Kohl, who had been caught in a doping control while riding for Gerolsteiner in 2008, accused Schmidt of having overseen the doping practices. Schmidt denied the accusations and was cleared by an Austrian court in early 2010. A statement of the court read: "It could not be determined that the plaintiff knew of the defendant's doping practices or helped him by the process of doping or with covering it up." Schmidt at this time worked for Team Milram. Following Dürr's statements, the police raided Schmidt's Erfurt offices on 27 February 2019. The investigation was carried out by the doping task force of the Munich police.

=== Involved athletes ===
On 20 March 2019, the state prosecutors in Bavaria confirmed that a total of 21 athletes were under suspicion of having been customers of Mark Schmidt. Not all names were initially reported, so as not to disturb investigative measures.

==== Winter sports ====
Following Dürr's statements, Austrian police arrested five athletes at the FIS Nordic World Ski Championships 2019 in Seefeld in Tirol. These were the cross-country skiers Max Hauke and Dominik Baldauf from Austria, Andreas Veerpalu and Karel Tammjärv from Estonia, as well as Alexey Poltoranin from Kazakhstan.

Initial revelations suggested that a German speed skater was also involved with Schmidt. On 27 May 2019, the media reported that alpine ski racer Hannes Reichelt was interviewed by the police in the preceding week, concerning possible involvement in the affair. Reichelt vehemently denied the accusations. The charges against Reichelt were dropped on 16 October 2019.

Max Hauke received a suspended five-month sentence on 30 October 2019 from an Innsbruck court for doping violations reaching back to 2015. Dominik Baldauf also received a suspended five-month sentence on 14 January 2020 from the same court. Both athletes had received four-year bans from competition from the Austrian Anti-Doping Agency on 23 July 2019. On 27 January 2020, Johannes Dürr was given a suspended 15-month jail sentence for his involvement in the affair, after pleading guilty. He did however deny having set up connections between Schmidt and fellow cross-country skiers Hauke and Baldauf, as they had claimed. A report by German newspaper Der Tagesspiegel claimed that Dürr had contemplated taking over the doping operations from Schmidt.

The International Ski Federation (FIS) handed four-year bans from competition to Andreas Veerpalu, Karel Tammjärv, and Algo Kärp as well as two Estonian coaches on 29 November 2019. All three athletes had earlier admitted their involvement in the doping practices. Alexey Poltoranin, who had earlier admitted to doping as well, retracted his confession on 8 March 2019. On 12 March, the Kazakh Ministry of Culture and Sports cleared Poltoranin of any charges of having doped, claiming that he only intended to do so and "Fortunately [...] did not use blood doping". He was nevertheless handed a four-year ban from competition by FIS on 6 January 2020.

==== Cycling ====
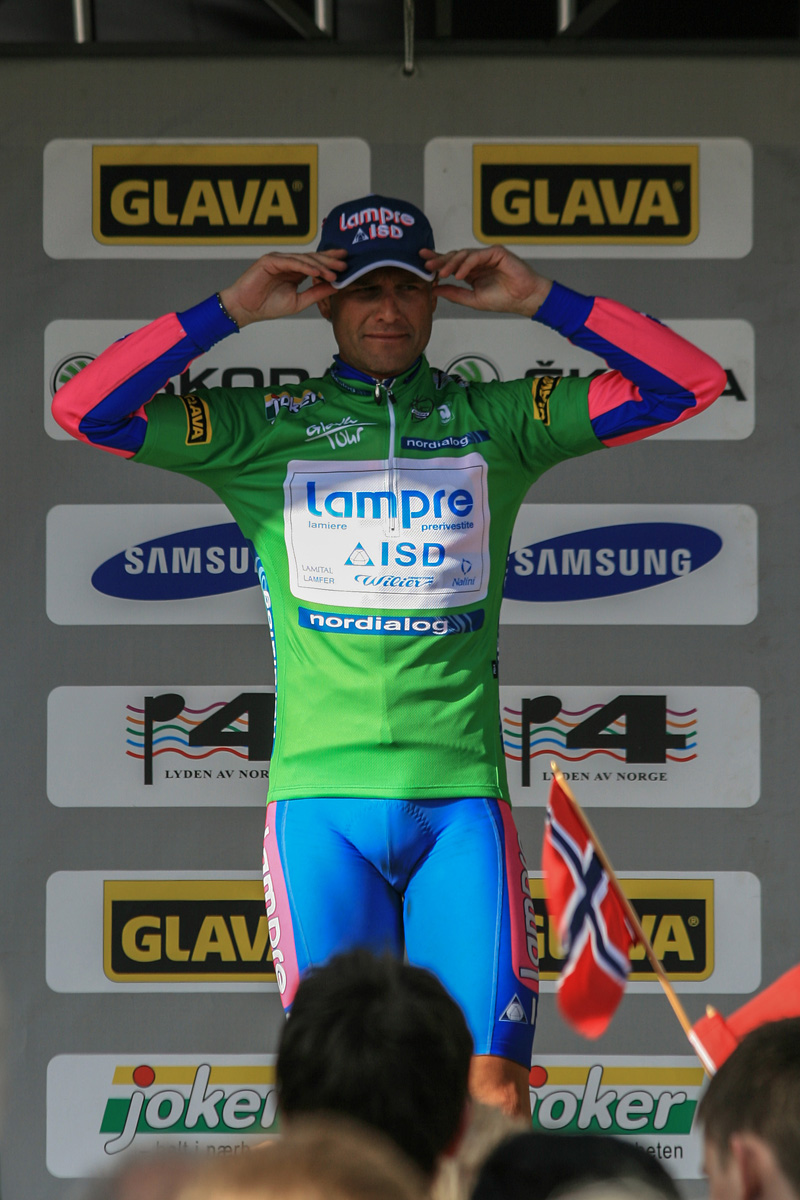
Alessandro Petacchi pictured in 2012, when he allegedly worked with Schmidt for the purposes of doping

On 3 March 2019, Stefan Denifl, who last rode for the Aqua Blue Sport team, confessed to using blood doping under the assistance of Schmidt. One day later, Georg Preidler, riding for Groupama–FDJ at the time, also confessed to having had two blood extractions with Schmidt in late 2018, but denied having actually doped. He nevertheless terminated his contract with the team. Both Denifl and Preidler were provisionally suspended by the sport's governing body, the UCI. Both were handed four-year bans by the Austrian anti-doping organisation on 27 June 2019, and faced charges for commercial sports fraud in addition to their suspensions. On 22 July 2020, Preidler was found guilty of fraud by the Innsbruck Regional Court and handed a twelve-month suspended prison sentence as well as being fined €2,880. Denifl meanwhile was convicted of sports fraud by an Austrian court in January 2021, receiving a 24-month prison sentence, 16 of which were on probation. In November 2021, Denifl's sentence was overturned on appeal, even though he had partly confessed.

Danilo Hondo confessed in an interview with German broadcaster ARD on 13 May 2019 to having used blood doping under Schmidt during 2011, when riding with Lampre–ISD. He was subsequently fired from his job as coach for the Swiss cycling federation. The following day, French newspaper Le Monde announced that retired Italian sprinter Alessandro Petacchi had allegedly worked with Schmidt in 2012 and 2013. Petacchi denied the accusations, but was nevertheless provisionally suspended by the UCI one day later. On 24 August 2019, Petacchi was given a two-year period of ineligibility from the UCI. Alongside Petacchi, Kristijan Koren (Bahrain–Merida), Kristijan Đurasek (UAE Team Emirates), and Borut Božič were also implicated and provisionally suspended. Koren and Đurasek were at the time riding the 2019 Giro d'Italia and the 2019 Tour of California respectively, while Božič worked as a directeur sportif for the Bahrain–Mérida team. Later the same day, Bahrain–Mérida and UAE Team Emirates confirmed that they had pulled their riders from the races. On 9 October, the UCI handed both Koren and Božič two-year bans from competition. On 13 November 2019, Đurasek was given a four-year ban from the UCI for his part in the doping practices.

On 19 May 2019, Italian newspaper Corriere della Sera reported links by Slovenian Milan Eržen to Operation Aderlass, while Eržen was serving as managing director of the Bahrain–Mérida team. Three days later, it was announced that the UCI had been following the activities of Eržen and Slovenian cycling in general in several investigations. Also in May 2019, the UCI suspended mountain biker Christina Kollmann due to blood doping violations in relation to Operation Aderlass. She was subsequently banned from competition for four years and received an eight-month suspended jail sentence from an Austrian court in August 2019. On 27 November 2019, the UCI announced that they had requested anti-doping samples from 2016 and 2017 to be retested, citing information gathered from Austrian authorities.

Retired cyclist Pirmin Lang, who last rode for IAM Cycling, admitted to his involvement with Aderlass on 22 February 2020, following investigations by Swiss newspaper Neue Zürcher Zeitung. He was subsequently dismissed by Swiss Racing Academy, a team he had co-founded and where he was employed as manager and directeur sportif.

In September 2021, Björn Thurau was suspended from competition for nine years and six months, after his involvement came to light due to chat messages he had exchanged with Lang. The German National Anti-Doping Agency (NADA) chose a particularly hard sentence, the longest ever imposed on a German athlete, due to the fact that he not only used, but also distributed performance-enhancing substances. Thurau never publicly acknowledged the accusations. He was stripped of all results from December 2010 onwards.

== Trial ==
The court trial against Schmidt began on 16 September 2020 at the Oberlandesgericht Munich. In its opening statement, the defense accused the prosecution of procedural errors, including illegal surveillance methods, incomplete paperwork, and undue custody.

On 29 September 2020, Schmidt took the stand and confessed to almost all of the 150 counts laid out against him. He admitted to having extracted blood from clients for the purposes of doping from as early as 2012. He did however deny to have acted for financial gain, claiming to have only received money to cover his costs, and insisted that the health of his clients had never been in danger. A day later, Johannes Dürr backed up Schmidt's claims. When testifying as a witness, Dürr claimed to have always "felt in safe, professional hands" with Schmidt. He furthermore refused to blame Schmidt for the doping, a decision he claimed to have taken with his coach. Three of the four co-defendants of Schmidt's also confessed, while another accused, a contractor, refused to testify. The contractor, Dirk Q., was sentenced to two years on probation in 2008 for bodily harm resulting in death, following an incident in January 2003, in which he allegedly assaulted two people, one of whom later died. Dirk Q. was—according to media reports—part of Erfurt's neo-Nazi scene. In this trial, Q. was accused of having worked together with Schmidt, transporting blood as well as doing transfusions. In November, Hondo testified in court, claiming that he doped with blood transfusions under Schmidt's guidance together with Petacchi during 2012. He testified that he had been contacted by Schmidt in late 2011 and then paid €25,000 for doping services over the course of the following year, at the end of which he ended the partnership. Hondo also described the usage of codenames, similar to Operación Puerto, with Hondo being known as "James Bond". At the end of the trial, Schmidt was sentenced to 4 years and 10 months in prison on 16 January 2021.

== Aftermath ==
In total, 50 people from nine countries were charged by the authorities during the Operation Aderlass investigation. According to the Austrian National Anti-Doping Agency (NADA Austria), 16 athletes were suspended by them following involvement in the practices. According to NADA Austria, the operation led to a change in control practices for doping, including testing closer to the beginning of competitions in certain disciplines as well as an update in the rules for anti-doping work in order to be able to react quicker to signs of blood doping. Insights from Operation Aderlass were also used when Austria updated their anti-doping laws in 2021. This included a provision for domestic Austrian sports organizations to work closely with NADA on doping prevention.

Mark Schmidt was released from prison early in June 2022, having served three quarters of his sentence, with the remaining time changed to probation.

== See also ==
- List of doping cases in cycling
