= Barnowo railway station =

Railway station in Pomeranian Voivodeship, Poland

Coordinates: 54.2399°N 17.2403°E

Barnowo

General information
- Location: Barnowo, Pomeranian Voivodeship; Poland
- Owner: Polskie Koleje Państwowe S.A.

Construction
- Structure type: Building: Yes (no longer used); Depot: Never existed Water tower: Never existed

History
- Former names: Barnow until 1945
Location

Barnowo is a non-operational PKP railway station in Barnowo (Pomeranian Voivodeship), Poland.

== Lines crossing the station ==
Start station	End station	Line type
Lipusz	Korzybie	Closed
