= Kołczygłówki railway station =

Railway station in Poland

Kołczygłówki

General information
- Location: Kołczygłówki; Poland
- Coordinates: 54.238518°N 17.191283°E
- Owner: Polskie Koleje Państwowe S.A.

Construction
- Structure type: Building: Yes (no longer used); Depot: Never existed Water tower: Never existed

History
- Former names: Neu Kolziglow until 1945
Location

Kołczygłówki is a non-operational PKP railway station in Kołczygłówki (Pomeranian Voivodeship), Poland.

== Lines crossing the station ==
Start station	End station	Line type
Lipusz	Korzybie	Closed
