= Klęskowo =

Klęskowo may refer to the following places in Poland:

- Klęskowo, Pomeranian Voivodeship
- Klęskowo, Szczecin
