= Milobadz =

Milobadz may refer to the following places in Poland:

- Miłobądz, Pomeranian Voivodeship (north Poland)
- Miłobądź, Pomeranian Voivodeship (north Poland)
- Miłobądz, West Pomeranian Voivodeship (north-west Poland)
- Miłobądź, West Pomeranian Voivodeship (north-west Poland)
