= Radusz =

Radusz may refer to the following places:

- Radusz, Greater Poland Voivodeship (west-central Poland)
- Radusz, Pomeranian Voivodeship (north Poland)
- Radusz, West Pomeranian Voivodeship (north-west Poland)
