= 1997 Tour de Pologne =

Cycling race

Race details
- Dates: 7–14 September 1997
- Stages: 8
- Distance: 1,435.5 km (892.0 mi)
- Winning time: 33h 27' 53"

Results
	Winner	Rolf Järmann (SUI)	(Casino)
	Second	Zenon Jaskuła (POL)	(Mapei–GB)
	Third	Sašo Sviben (SLO)	(Slovenia)

The 1997 Tour de Pologne was the 54th edition of the Tour de Pologne cycle race and was held from 7 September to 14 September 1997. The race started in Kołczygłowy and finished in Kraków. The race was won by Rolf Järmann of the Casino team.

Previous year's (1996) winner was Viatscheslav Djavanin (RUS).

== General classification ==
Final general classification

Rank	Rider	Team	Time
1	Rolf Järmann (SUI)	Casino	33h 27' 53"
2	Zenon Jaskuła (POL)	Mapei–GB	+ 25"
3	Sašo Sviben (SLO)	Slovenia	+ 1' 02"
4	Alexander Vinokourov (KAZ)	Casino	+ 1' 19"
5	Alexei Sivakov (RUS)	Roslotto–ZG Mobili	+ 1' 54"
6	Dainis Ozols (LAT)	Mróz	+ 1' 58"
7	Piotr Ugrumov (LAT)	Roslotto–ZG Mobili	+ 2' 41"
8	Markus Zberg (SUI)	Mercatone Uno	+ 2' 54"
9	Piotr Chmielewski (POL)	Pekaes–Irena–Zepter	+ 3' 58"
10	Gianpaolo Mondini (ITA)	Amore & Vita–ForzArcore	+ 4' 01"
