= Jan Polanc =

Slovenian cyclist

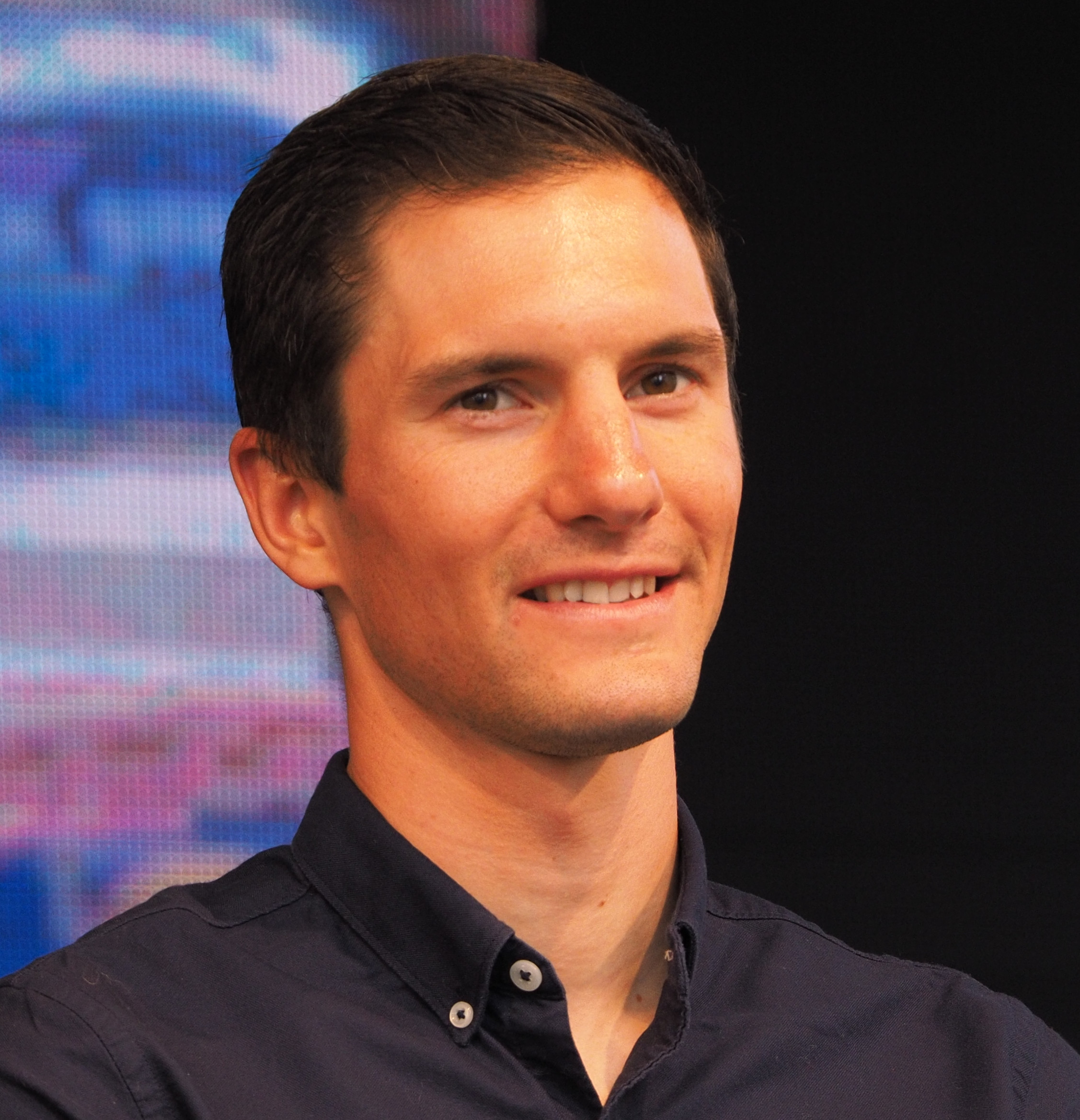
- Polanc in 2019

Personal information
- Born: 6 May 1992 (age 34) Kranj, Slovenia
- Height: 1.72 m (5 ft 8 in)
- Weight: 59 kg (130 lb)

Cycling career
- Sport: Cycling
- Current team: Retired
- Discipline: Road
- Role: Rider
- Rider type: Climber

Amateur team
- 2011–2013: Radenska

Professional team
- 2013–2023: Lampre–Merida

Major wins
- Grand Tours Giro d'Italia 2 individual stages (2015, 2017) One-day races and Classics National Time Trial Championships (2017) Trofeo Laigueglia (2022)

Jan Polanc (born 6 May 1992) is a Slovenian former racing cyclist, who competed professionally for UCI WorldTeam UAE Team Emirates from 2013 to 2023. He is a two time Giro d'Italia stage winner. He was forced to retire in May 2023 after cardiac scans revealed heart irregularities.

== Major results ==
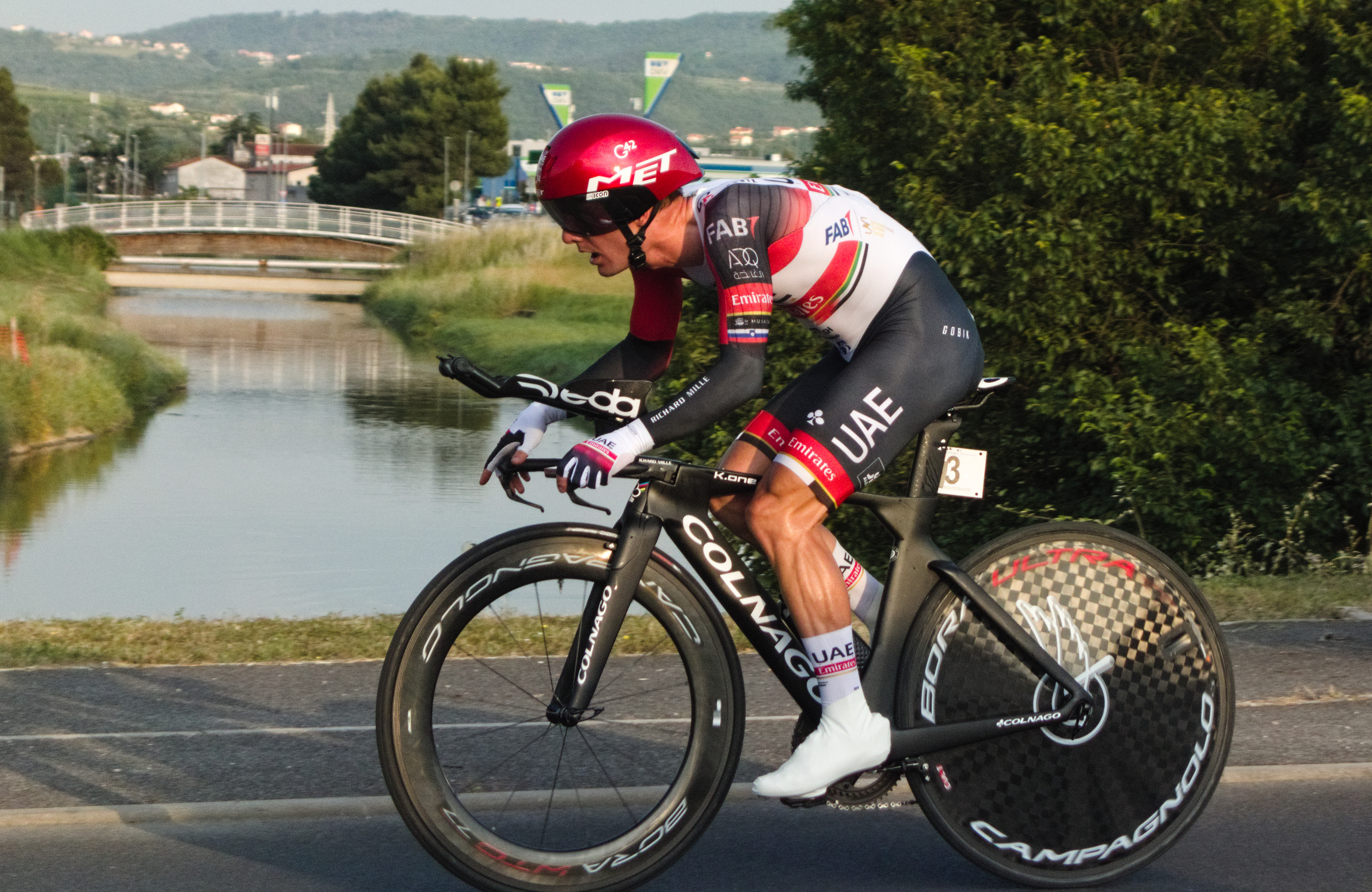
Polanc finished second at the 2021 Slovenian National Time Trial Championships, behind Jan Tratnik

2009
National Junior Road Championships

1st Road race
3rd Time trial

10th Overall Grand Prix Général Patton
2010
1st Time trial, National Junior Road Championships
2nd Trofeo Guido Dorigo
3rd Trofeo Buffoni
4th Overall Giro della Lunigiana

1st Stage 3

5th Road race, UCI Juniors Road World Championships
8th Overall Course de la Paix Juniors
10th Overall Trofeo Karlsberg
2011
5th Overall Giro della Regione Friuli Venezia Giulia
5th Trofeo Città di San Vendemiano
7th Gran Premio di Poggiana
8th Trofeo Banca Popolare di Vicenza
8th Giro del Belvedere
10th Trofeo Zsšdi
2012
1st Time trial, National Under-23 Road Championships
1st Piccolo Giro di Lombardia
1st Young rider classification, Tour of Slovenia
2nd Overall Okolo Jižních Čech
5th Overall Czech Cycling Tour
6th Trofeo Città di San Vendemiano
9th Overall Giro della Regione Friuli Venezia Giulia
9th Trofeo Zsšdi
9th Trofeo Banca Popolare di Vicenza
2013
1st Overall Giro della Regione Friuli Venezia Giulia

1st Young rider classification
1st Stage 4

2nd Overall Tour of Slovenia

1st Young rider classification

5th Overall Course de la Paix Under-23
5th La Côte Picarde
8th GP Kranj
10th Overall Istrian Spring Trophy
2014
9th Japan Cup
2015
Giro d'Italia

1st Stage 5
Held after Stages 5–7

5th Japan Cup
6th Giro dell'Emilia
8th Overall Tour of Slovenia
2017
1st Time trial, National Road Championships
Giro d'Italia

1st Stage 4
Held after Stages 4–11

1st Mountains classification, Tour La Provence
5th Overall Tour of Croatia
2019
6th Overall Tour of Turkey
6th Overall Tour of Oman
6th Overall Giro di Sicilia
7th Overall Adriatica Ionica Race
9th Overall Tour of Slovenia
Giro d'Italia

Held after Stages 12–13

2020
3rd Time trial, National Road Championships
6th Gran Trittico Lombardo
2021
National Road Championships

2nd Road race
2nd Time trial

5th Giro dell'Appennino
9th Overall Tour of Slovenia
2022
1st Trofeo Laigueglia
3rd Time trial, National Road Championships
7th Overall Settimana Internazionale di Coppi e Bartali

=== Grand Tour general classification results timeline ===
Grand Tour	2014	2015	2016	2017	2018	2019	2020	2021	2022
Giro d'Italia	42	53	—	11	32	14	—	—	—
Tour de France	—	—	54	—	—	—	40	—	—
Vuelta a España	—	—	—	38	—	—	—	41	12
