= Grępno =

- Settlement
- Location within Poland
- Coordinates: 54°5′29″N 17°12′4″E
- Country: Poland
- Voivodeship: Pomeranian
- County: Bytów
- Gmina: Kołczygłowy

Grępno [ˈɡrɛmpnɔ] is a settlement in the administrative district of Gmina Kołczygłowy, within Bytów County, Pomeranian Voivodeship, in northern Poland.
