= Wierszynko =

- Settlement
- Location within Poland
- Coordinates: 54°17′24″N 17°12′19″E
- Country: Poland
- Voivodeship: Pomeranian
- County: Bytów
- Gmina: Kołczygłowy

Wierszynko [vjɛrˈʂɨnkɔ] is a settlement in the administrative district of Gmina Kołczygłowy, within Bytów County, Pomeranian Voivodeship, in northern Poland.

For details of the history of the region, see History of Pomerania.

== Climate ==
Wierszynko is located in northern Poland near the Baltic Sea and experiences a temperate continental climate with slight maritime influences, giving it four distinct seasons and a gradual variation in temperatures between winter and summer.

=== Winter ===
Winter typically lasts from November to March, with low temperatures. In January, the average temperature ranges from about −1 °C to 0 °C, and nighttime temperatures can drop below freezing. This period is characterized by snowfall and snow cover, with short daylight hours and generally overcast conditions.

=== Spring ===
Spring begins around April and continues until May. During this season, temperatures gradually rise, snow melts if present, daylight hours increase, and vegetation becomes more active. Average high temperatures in May can reach approximately 12–16 °C.

=== Summer ===
Summer extends from June to August and is the warmest period of the year. Average high temperatures are around 20–24 °C, occasionally higher on peak days. This season has the longest days of the year, with moderate rainfall usually occurring as showers or brief storms.

=== Autumn ===
Autumn lasts from September to October. Temperatures gradually decrease, daylight hours shorten, and the likelihood of rain and cloudy weather increases. Natural foliage changes color, and nights become cooler.
