= Nowe Łubno =

- Settlement
- Location within Poland
- Coordinates: 54°8′21″N 17°13′54″E
- Country: Poland
- Voivodeship: Pomeranian
- County: Bytów
- Gmina: Kołczygłowy

Nowe Łubno [ˈnɔvɛ ˈwubnɔ] is a settlement in the administrative district of Gmina Kołczygłowy, within Bytów County, Pomeranian Voivodeship, in northern Poland.

For details of the history of the region, see History of Pomerania.
