= Gęślice =

- Settlement
- Location within Poland
- Coordinates: 54°16′9″N 17°14′34″E
- Country: Poland
- Voivodeship: Pomeranian
- County: Bytów
- Gmina: Kołczygłowy

Gęślice [ɡɛ̃ˈɕlit͡sɛ] (German: Elisenhöhe)is a settlement in the administrative district of Gmina Kołczygłowy, within Bytów County, Pomeranian Voivodeship, in northern Poland.
