= Darżkowo =

- Village
- Location within Poland
- Coordinates: 54°16′34″N 17°10′26″E
- Country: Poland
- Voivodeship: Pomeranian
- County: Bytów
- Gmina: Kołczygłowy
- Population: 83

Darżkowo [darʂˈkɔvɔ] (German: Darsekow) is a village in the administrative district of Gmina Kołczygłowy, within Bytów County, Pomeranian Voivodeship, in northern Poland.
