= 2022 Trofeo Laigueglia =

2022 UCI ProSeries

Race details
- Dates: 2 March 2022
- Stages: 1
- Distance: 202.0 km (125.5 mi)
- Winning time: 5h 02' 25"

Results
	Winner	Jan Polanc (SLO)	(UAE Team Emirates)
	Second	Juan Ayuso (ESP)	(UAE Team Emirates)
	Third	Alessandro Covi (ITA)	(UAE Team Emirates)

The 2022 Trofeo Laigueglia was a one-day road cycling race that took place on 2 March 2022 in and around Laigueglia. It was the 59th edition of the Trofeo Laigueglia and was rated as a 1.Pro event as part the 2022 UCI ProSeries. The race covered 202 kilometres (126 mi) and finished off with four laps of a finishing circuit that was 11 kilometres (6.8 mi) long and featured two short and sharp climbs, the Colla Micheri and the Capo Mele.

The race was won by Jan Polanc racing for UAE Team Emirates.

== Teams ==
Twenty-five teams were invited to the race. Along with the Italian national team, there were eight UCI WorldTour teams, seven UCI ProTeams, and eight UCI Continental teams. Each team entered up to seven riders, with the exceptions of Astana Qazaqstan Team, which entered six riders, and B&B Hotels–KTM, which only entered five. Of the starting peloton of 165 riders, only 79 finished.

UCI WorldTeams

- AG2R Citroën Team
- Astana Qazaqstan Team
- Cofidis
- Groupama–FDJ
- Ineos Grenadiers
- Intermarché–Wanty–Gobert Matériaux
- Trek–Segafredo
- UAE Team Emirates

UCI ProTeams

- Arkéa–Samsic
- B&B Hotels–KTM
- Bardiani–CSF–Faizanè
- Bingoal Pauwels Sauces WB
- Drone Hopper–Androni Giocattoli
- Eolo–Kometa
- Equipo Kern Pharma

UCI Continental teams

- Beltrami TSA–Tre Colli
- Biesse–Carrera
- General Store–Essegibi–Fratelli Curia
- MG.K Vis Colors for Peace VPM
- Team Colpack–Ballan
- Team Corratec
- Team Qhubeka
- Work Service–Vitalcare–Vega

National teams

- Italy

== Result ==
Result
Rank	Rider	Team	Time
1	Jan Polanc (SLO)	UAE Team Emirates	5h 02' 25"
2	Juan Ayuso (ESP)	UAE Team Emirates	+ 2"
3	Alessandro Covi (ITA)	UAE Team Emirates	+ 2"
4	Lorenzo Rota (ITA)	Intermarché–Wanty–Gobert Matériaux	+ 2"
5	Carlos Rodríguez (ESP)	Ineos Grenadiers	+ 8"
6	Victor Lafay (FRA)	Cofidis	+ 24"
7	Diego Ulissi (ITA)	UAE Team Emirates	+ 32"
8	Giulio Ciccone (ITA)	Trek–Segafredo	+ 32"
9	Quentin Pacher (FRA)	Groupama–FDJ	+ 32"
10	Clément Champoussin (FRA)	AG2R Citroën Team	+ 32"
