= Dean Podgornik =

Slovenian cyclist

Personal information
- Born: 3 July 1979 (age 47) Nova Gorica, Slovenia

Cycling career
- Sport: Cycling
- Current team: Retired
- Discipline: Road
- Role: Rider

Amateur teams
- 1998–1999: Team Parolin Fis
- 2000–2001: Sava Kranj
- 2002: HiT Casino

Professional teams
- 2003: Perutnina Ptuj
- 2004–2005: Tenax
- 2006: Team PR Austria
- 2007: MapaMap-BantProfi
- 2009–2010: Loborika
- 2011: Manisaspor

Dean Podgornik (born 3 July 1979, in Nova Gorica) is a former Slovenian cyclist.

== Palmares ==
2001
1st Stage 3 Tour of Slovenia
2002
2nd Overall Tour of Slovenia

1st Stage 2b (ITT)

2003
1st Stage 8 Olympia's Tour
1st Stage 3a Tour de Serbie
3rd Poreč Trophy
3rd National Time Trial Championships
2004
1st National Time Trial Championships
2005
2nd Veenendaal–Veenendaal
3rd National Time Trial Championships
2010
1st Overall Tour du Maroc

1st Stages 1 & 4
