= Blaž Jarc =

Slovenian former professional cyclist (born 1988)

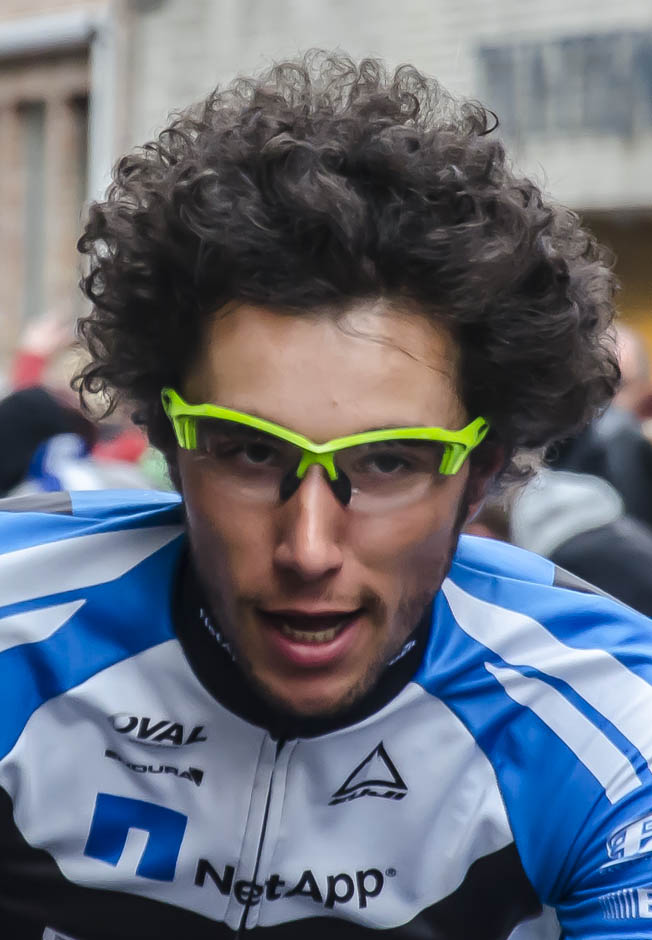

Personal information
- Nickname: Blazer
- Born: 17 July 1988 (age 38) Novo Mesto, Slovenia
- Height: 1.94 m (6 ft 4 in)
- Weight: 87 kg (192 lb)

Cycling career
- Sport: Cycling
- Discipline: Road
- Role: Rider
- Rider type: Sprinter

Professional teams
- 2007–2011: Adria Mobil
- 2011: Team NetApp (stagiaire)
- 2012–2014: Team NetApp

Blaž Jarc (born 17 July 1988) is a Slovenian former professional cyclist, who competed professionally between 2007 and 2014.

== Major results ==
2005
1st Road race, National Junior Road Championships
2007
5th Gran Premio della Liberazione
2009
1st Time trial, National Under-23 Road Championships
8th Time trial, UCI Under-23 Road World Championships
10th Time trial, UEC European Under-23 Road Championships
2010
1st Time trial, National Under-23 Road Championships
3rd ZLM Tour
9th Gran Premio Industria e Commercio Artigianato Carnaghese
2011
1st Porec Trophy
2nd Overall Tour of Gallipoli

1st Stage 1 (ITT)

6th Tour of Vojvodina II
7th Memoriał Henryka Łasaka
8th Rund um Köln
2012
4th Schaal Sels
6th Dutch Food Valley Classic
2013
1st Grote Prijs Stad Zottegem
6th Omloop van het Houtland
7th Halle–Ingooigem
2014
3rd Time trial, National Road Championships
