= Jasionka, Pomeranian Voivodeship =

Jasionka
- Settlement
- Location within Poland
- Coordinates: 54°9′33″N 17°14′4″E
- Country: Poland
- Voivodeship: Pomeranian
- County: Bytów
- Gmina: Kołczygłowy

Jasionka [jaˈɕɔnka] (German: Jassonke) is a settlement in the administrative district of Gmina Kołczygłowy, within Bytów County, Pomeranian Voivodeship, in northern Poland.
