= Nowa Jasionka =

- Settlement
- Location within Poland
- Coordinates: 54°8′57″N 17°14′57″E
- Country: Poland
- Voivodeship: Pomeranian
- County: Bytów
- Gmina: Kołczygłowy
- Population: 0

Nowa Jasionka [ˈnɔva jaˈɕɔnka] is a former settlement in the administrative district of Gmina Kołczygłowy, within Bytów County, Pomeranian Voivodeship, in northern Poland.

For details of the history of the region, see History of Pomerania.
