= Barnowiec, Pomeranian Voivodeship =

Barnowiec
- Village
- Location within Poland
- Coordinates: 54°12′51″N 17°14′5″E
- Country: Poland
- Voivodeship: Pomeranian
- County: Bytów
- Gmina: Kołczygłowy

Population
  - Total: 240
- Postal code: 77-140

Barnowiec [barˈnɔvʲɛt͡s] (German: Reinfeld) is a village in the administrative district of Gmina Kołczygłowy, within Bytów County, Pomeranian Voivodeship, in northern Poland.

The surrounding terrain is very mountainous, with 3 large mountains in a 4 km (2 mi) radius of the village. Wierch nad Kamieniem is just 2.3 km (1 mi) from the village, Pisana Hala at 3.3 km (2 mi) from the village and finally Pstra at 3.7 km (2 mi) from the village centre.

== Notable residents ==
- Johanna von Bismarck, née von Puttkamer (1824-1894) wife of Otto von Bismarck
