= Gałąźnia Wielka =

- Village
- Location within Poland
- Coordinates: 54°18′5″N 17°19′3″E
- Country: Poland
- Voivodeship: Pomeranian
- County: Bytów
- Gmina: Kołczygłowy
- Population: 383

Gałąźnia Wielka [ɡaˈwɔ̃ʑɲa ˈvjɛlka] (German: Groß Gansen) is a village in the administrative district of Gmina Kołczygłowy, within Bytów County, Pomeranian Voivodeship, in northern Poland.
