= Gałąźnia Mała =

- Village
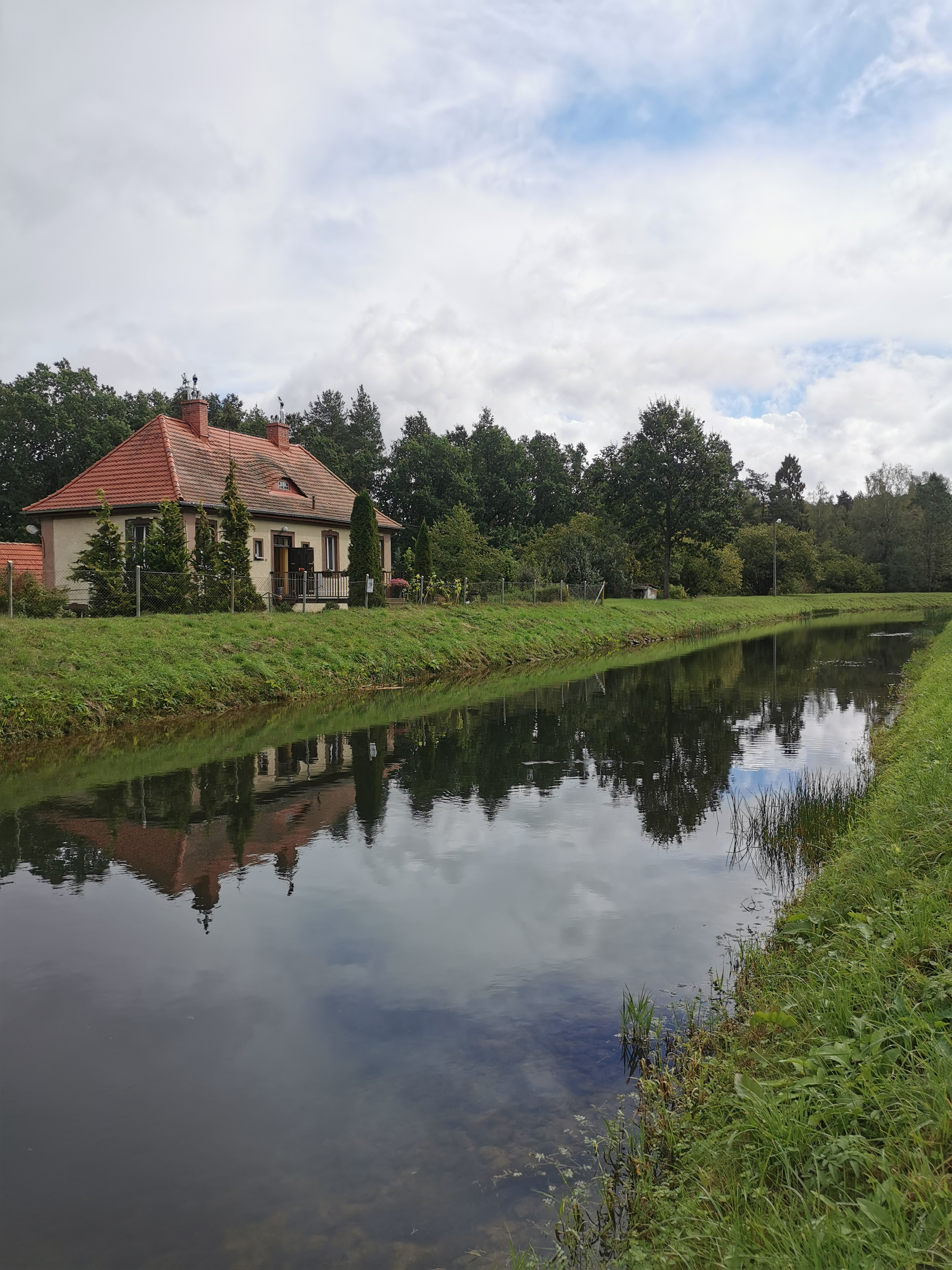

- Location within Poland
- Coordinates: 54°17′20″N 17°18′27″E
- Country: Poland
- Voivodeship: Pomeranian
- County: Bytów
- Gmina: Kołczygłowy
- Population: 132
- Time zone: UTC+1 (CET)
  - Summer (DST): UTC+2 (CEST)
- Postal code: 77-140

Gałąźnia Mała [ɡaˈwɔ̃ʑɲa ˈmawa] (German: Klein Gansen) is a village in the administrative district of Gmina Kołczygłowy, within Bytów County, Pomeranian Voivodeship, in northern Poland.
