= Pustka, Bytów County =

Pustka
- Settlement
- Location within Poland
- Coordinates: 54°7′54″N 17°14′45″E
- Country: Poland
- Voivodeship: Pomeranian
- County: Bytów
- Gmina: Kołczygłowy

Pustka [ˈpustka] (German Putsch) is a settlement in the administrative district of Gmina Kołczygłowy, within Bytów County, Pomeranian Voivodeship, in northern Poland.

For details of the history of the region, see History of Pomerania.
