= Podgórze, Pomeranian Voivodeship =

Podgórze
- Village
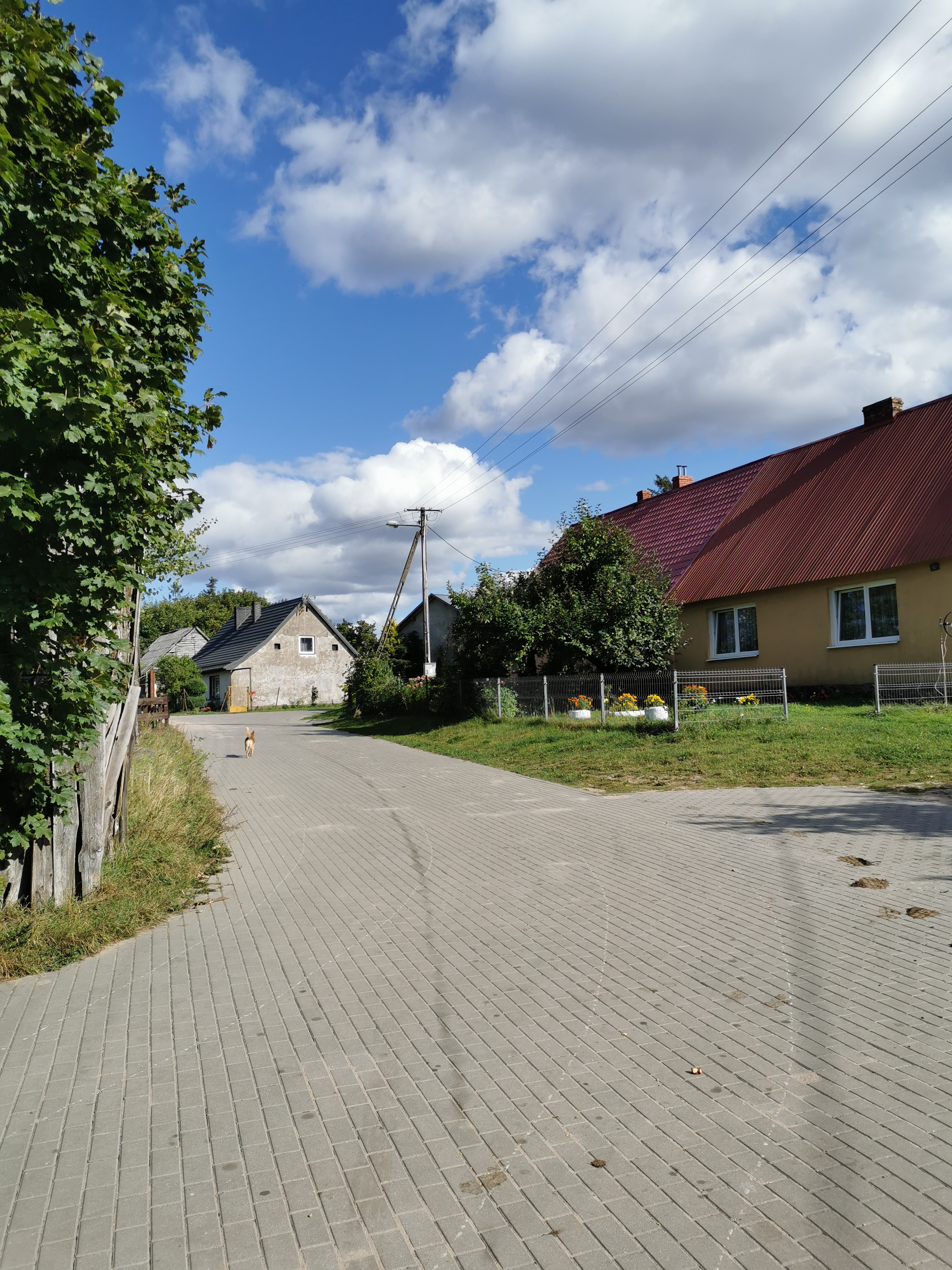

- Location within Poland
- Coordinates: 54°6′18″N 17°13′5″E
- Country: Poland
- Voivodeship: Pomeranian
- County: Bytów
- Gmina: Kołczygłowy

Population
  - Total: 101
- Time zone: UTC+1 (CET)
  - Summer (DST): UTC+2 (CEST)
- Vehicle registration: GBY

Podgórze [pɔdˈɡuʐɛ] is a village in the administrative district of Gmina Kołczygłowy, within Bytów County, Pomeranian Voivodeship, in northern Poland.
