= Przyborze, Pomeranian Voivodeship =

Przyborze
- Settlement
- Location within Poland
- Coordinates: 54°8′32″N 17°16′17″E
- Country: Poland
- Voivodeship: Pomeranian
- County: Bytów
- Gmina: Kołczygłowy
- Population: 18

Przyborze [pʂɨˈbɔʐɛ] is a settlement in the administrative district of Gmina Kołczygłowy, within Bytów County, Pomeranian Voivodeship, in northern Poland.

For details of the history of the region, see History of Pomerania.
