= Laski, Bytów County =

Laski
- Settlement
- Location within Poland
- Coordinates: 54°9′12″N 17°11′11″E
- Country: Poland
- Voivodeship: Pomeranian
- County: Bytów
- Gmina: Kołczygłowy

Laski (Polish pronunciation: [ˈlaskʲi]) is a settlement in the administrative district of Gmina Kołczygłowy, within Bytów County, Pomeranian Voivodeship, in northern Poland.

For details of the history of the region, see History of Pomerania.
