= Górki, Bytów County =

Górki
- Village
- Location within Poland
- Coordinates: 54°16′56″N 17°14′39″E
- Country: Poland
- Voivodeship: Pomeranian
- County: Bytów
- Gmina: Kołczygłowy
- Population: 140

Górki [ˈɡurki] (German: Merino Schäferei) is a village in the administrative district of Gmina Kołczygłowy, within Bytów County, Pomeranian Voivodeship, in northern Poland.
