= Witanowo =

- Village
- Location within Poland
- Coordinates: 54°6′52″N 17°13′4″E
- Country: Poland
- Voivodeship: Pomeranian
- County: Bytów
- Gmina: Kołczygłowy
- Population: 75

Witanowo [vitaˈnɔvɔ] is a village in the administrative district of Gmina Kołczygłowy, within Bytów County, Pomeranian Voivodeship, in northern Poland.

For details of the history of the region, see History of Pomerania.
