= Kristijan Koren =

Slovenian road bicycle racer

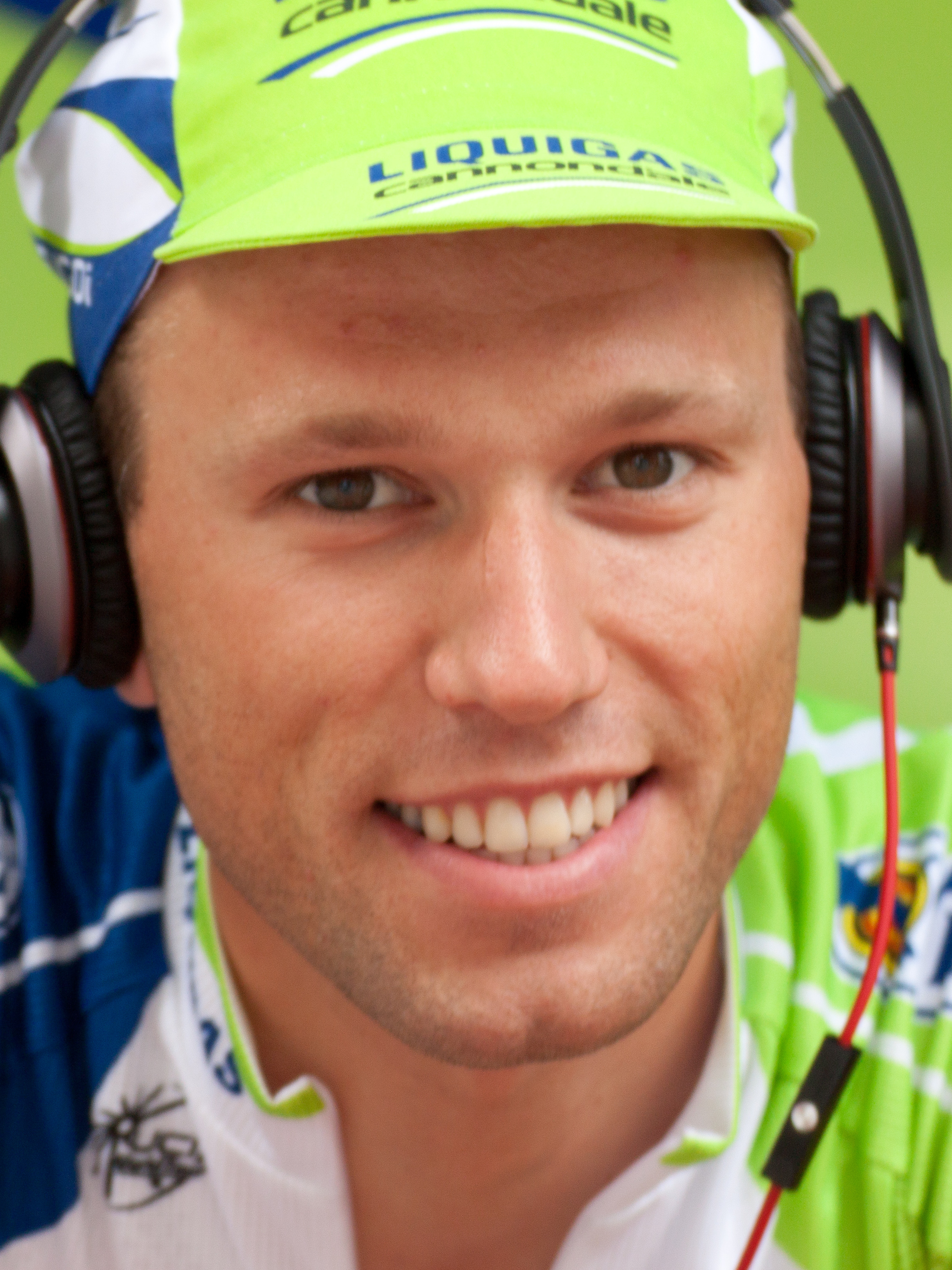
- Koren at the 2012 Critérium du Dauphiné

Personal information
- Born: 25 November 1986 (age 39) Postojna, Slovenia
- Height: 1.83 m (6 ft 0 in)
- Weight: 73 kg (161 lb; 11 st 7 lb)

Cycling career
- Sport: Cycling
- Current team: Kolesarski Klub Novo Mesto
- Discipline: Road
- Role: Rider
- Rider type: All-rounder; Domestique

Amateur teams
- 2005–2007: Sava
- 2008: Perutnina Ptuj
- 2009: Bottoli Nordelettrica Ramonda

Professional teams
- 2010–2014: Liquigas–Doimo
- 2015–2017: Cannondale–Garmin
- 2018–2019: Bahrain–Merida
- 2022–2023: Adria Mobil

Major wins
- One-day races and Classics National Road Race Championships (2022)

Kristijan Koren (born 25 November 1986) is a Slovenian former professional road racing cyclist, who rode for UCI Continental team Kolesarski Klub Novo Mesto.

During his racing career, Koren won the Gran Premio Città di Camaiore in 2010, and the Slovenian National Road Race Championships in 2022. He also served a doping suspension between 2019 and 2021, for his involvement in Operation Aderlass, an investigation into the practices of German physician Mark Schmidt.

== Career ==
Born in Postojna, Koren turned professional with Liquigas–Doimo, a UCI ProTeam, in 2010. He remained with Liquigas–Cannondale for the 2011, 2012, 2013, and 2014 seasons.

Koren signed with Cannondale–Garmin, a UCI ProTeam, for the 2015 season. He was named in the start list for the 2017 Giro d'Italia. In 2019, Koren was banned for two years after it was found that he had doped. The discovery was part of Operation Aderlass.

Upon the conclusion of his suspension, Koren returned to professional racing, competing at the Tour of Slovenia and the GP Kranj in 2021, with the Slovenia national team. He remained without a team until the following May, when he joined the Adria Mobil team ahead of the 2022 Tour de Hongrie. The following month, Koren won the Slovenian National Road Race Championships, after an attack 13 kilometres (8.1 miles) from the finish. It was his final victory, as he announced that he would retire from the sport at the end of 2023.

== Personal life ==
Koren previously resided in Budanje, Slovenia.

== Major results ==
2006
National Under-23 Road Championships

1st Time trial
3rd Road race

5th Time trial, UEC European Under-23 Road Championships
10th Time trial, UCI Under-23 Road World Championships
2007
National Under-23 Road Championships

1st Time trial
3rd Road race

6th Overall Istrian Spring Trophy
6th La Côte Picarde
8th Overall The Paths of King Nikola
2008
1st La Côte Picarde
Vuelta a Cuba

1st Stages 5 & 15

2nd Time trial, National Road Championships
2nd Overall Istrian Spring Trophy

1st Prologue

3rd Overall Giro delle Regioni
3rd Tour de Rijke
UEC European Road Under-23 Championships

6th Road race
10th Time trial

7th Time trial, UCI Road World Under-23 Championships
7th Gran Premio della Liberazione
2009
Giro della Valle d'Aosta

1st Stages 1a (TTT) & 7

2nd Gran Premio di Poggiana
3rd Time trial, National Road Championships
4th Giro del Medio Brenta
5th Time trial, Mediterranean Games
5th Overall Giro del Friuli-Venezia Giulia

1st Stage 3

5th Overall Girobio

1st Stages 8 & 9

7th Memorial Davide Fardelli
2010
1st Gran Premio Città di Camaiore
2nd Time trial, National Road Championships

Voided results from January 2011 to December 2012

2011
~~3rd Time trial, National Road Championships~~
~~4th Coppa Bernocchi~~
~~6th Overall Tour of Slovenia~~
2012
~~3rd Overall Tour of Slovenia~~

~~1st Points classification~~
~~1st Stage 4 (ITT)~~

2014
2nd Gran Premio Bruno Beghelli
4th Overall Tour of Slovenia
5th RideLondon–Surrey Classic
6th Gran Premio della Costa Etruschi
9th Dutch Food Valley Classic
2021
6th GP Kranj
2022
1st Road race, National Road Championships

=== Grand Tour general classification results timeline ===
Grand Tour	2010	2011	2012	2013	2014	2015	2016	2017	2018	2019
Giro d'Italia	—	—	—	—	—	—	—	128	—	DNF
Tour de France	93	~~85~~	~~98~~	100	135	69	152	—	102	—
Vuelta a España	Did not contest during his career									

Legend
—	Did not compete
DNF	Did not finish
DSQ	Disqualified
~~No.~~	Results expunged
