= Gmina Kołczygłowy =

Gmina Kołczygłowy Kołczygłowy Commune
- Gmina
- Coat of arms
- Interactive map of Gmina Kołczygłowy
- Coordinates (Kołczygłowy): 54°14′23″N 17°13′36″E
- Country: Poland
- Voivodeship: Pomeranian
- County: Bytów
- Seat: Kołczygłowy

Area
  - Total: 173.34 km^{2} (66.93 sq mi)

Population (2006)
  - Total: 4,321
  - Density: 24.93/km^{2} (64.56/sq mi)
- Website: http://www.kolczyglowy.pl/

Gmina Kołczygłowy is a rural gmina (administrative district) in Bytów County, Pomeranian Voivodeship, in northern Poland. Its seat is the village of Kołczygłowy, which lies approximately 22 kilometres (14 mi) north-west of Bytów and 93 km (58 mi) west of the regional capital Gdańsk.

The gmina covers an area of 173.34 square kilometres (66.9 sq mi), and as of 2006 its total population is 4,321.

The gmina contains part of the protected area called Słupia Valley Landscape Park.

== Villages ==
Gmina Kołczygłowy contains the villages and settlements of Barkocin, Barnowiec, Barnowo, Barnowski Młyn, Darżkowo, Dobojewo, Gałąźnia Mała, Gałąźnia Wielka, Gęślice, Górki, Grępno, Jasionka, Jezierze, Klęskowo, Kołczygłówki, Kołczygłowy, Laski, Łobzowo, Łubno, Miłobądź, Nowa Jasionka, Nowe Łubno, Podgórze, Przyborze, Pustka, Radusz, Różki, Sierowo, Świelubie, Wądół, Wierszynko, Wierszyno, Witanowo, Zagony and Zatoki.

== Neighbouring gminas ==
Gmina Kołczygłowy is bordered by the gminas of Borzytuchom, Dębnica Kaszubska, Miastko, Trzebielino and Tuchomie.
