= Saša Sviben =

Slovenian cyclist

Personal information
- Born: 10 January 1973 (age 53) Celje, Slovenia

Cycling career
- Sport: Cycling
- Current team: Retired
- Discipline: Road
- Role: Rider

Professional teams
- 1998: KRKA–Telekom Slovenije
- 2000–2001: Stabil–Steiermark
- 2002: Nürnberger Versicherung
- 2003: Perutnina Ptuj

Saša Sviben (born 10 January 1973) is a Slovenian former road cyclist, who competed as a professional from 1998 to 2003.

== Major results ==
1997
National Road Championships

1st Road race
1st Time trial

3rd Overall Tour de Pologne
1998
1st GP Puch Ptuj
8th Overall Tour de Slovénie
8th Overall Tour de Normandie
1999
2nd Time trial, National Road Championships
5th Overall GP Kranj
2000
2nd Raiffeisen Grand Prix
2nd GP Krka
2nd Völkermarkter Radsporttage
2001
1st Kettler Classic-Südkärnten
1st Giro del Medio Brenta
National Road Championships

2nd Time trial
4th Road race

3rd Overall Sachsen-Tour
3rd Criterium d'Abruzzo
3rd Lavanttaler Radsporttage
5th Overall UNIQA Classic
5th Trophy Riviera II
2002
1st Rund um die Hainleite
2nd Road race, National Road Championships
8th Ronde van Drenthe
2003
4th Road race, National Road Championships
