= Zatoki, Pomeranian Voivodeship =

Zatoki
- Village
- Location within Poland
- Coordinates: 54°15′51″N 17°21′3″E
- Country: Poland
- Voivodeship: Pomeranian
- County: Bytów
- Gmina: Kołczygłowy
- Population: 5

Zatoki [zaˈtɔki] is a village in the administrative district of Gmina Kołczygłowy, within Bytów County, Pomeranian Voivodeship, in northern Poland.

For details of the history of the region, see History of Pomerania.
