= Barnowski Młyn =

- Settlement
- Location within Poland
- Coordinates: 54°13′57″N 17°16′26″E
- Country: Poland
- Voivodeship: Pomeranian
- County: Bytów
- Gmina: Kołczygłowy
- Population: 0
- Time zone: UTC+1 (CET)
  - Summer (DST): UTC+2 (CEST)
- Vehicle registration: GBY

Barnowski Młyn [barˈnɔfski ˈmwɨn] (German: Barnower Mühle) is a former settlement in the administrative district of Gmina Kołczygłowy, within Bytów County, Pomeranian Voivodeship, in northern Poland.
