= Dobojewo, Bytów County =

Dobojewo
- Village
- Location within Poland
- Coordinates: 54°17′58″N 17°13′11″E
- Country: Poland
- Voivodeship: Pomeranian
- County: Bytów
- Gmina: Kołczygłowy

Dobojewo [dɔbɔˈjɛvɔ] (German: Franzhof) is a village in the administrative district of Gmina Kołczygłowy, within Bytów County, Pomeranian Voivodeship, in northern Poland.
