= Jezierze =

- Village
- Location within Poland
- Coordinates: 54°15′14″N 17°11′9″E
- Country: Poland
- Voivodeship: Pomeranian
- County: Bytów
- Gmina: Kołczygłowy
- Elevation: 230 m (750 ft)

Jezierze [jɛˈʑɛʐɛ] is a village in the administrative district of Gmina Kołczygłowy, within Bytów County, Pomeranian Voivodeship, in northern Poland.
