= Kołczygłowy =

- Village
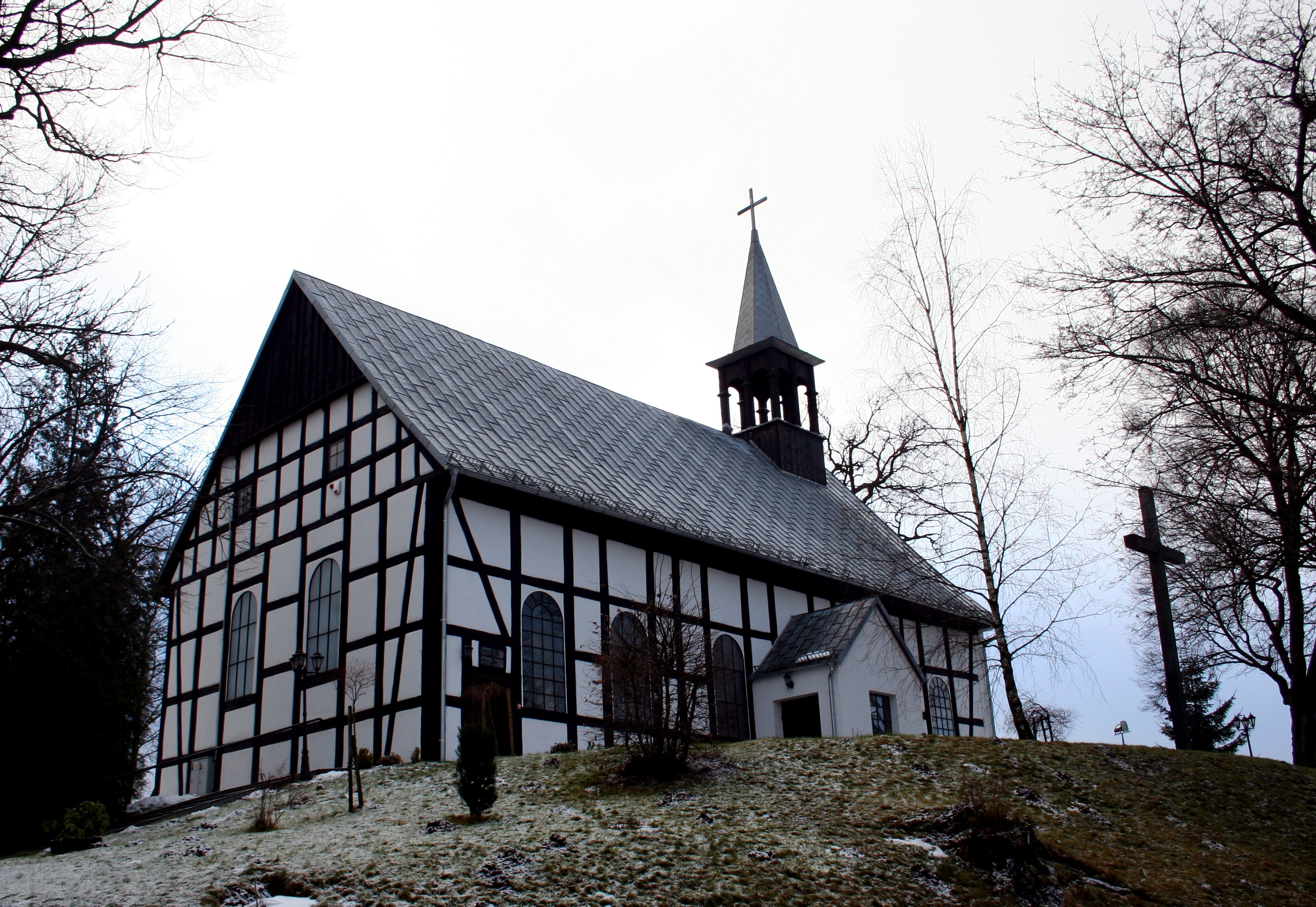
- Christ the King church in Kołczygłowy

- Coat of arms

- Location within Poland
- Coordinates: 54°14′23″N 17°13′36″E
- Country: Poland
- Voivodeship: Pomeranian
- County: Bytów
- Gmina: Kołczygłowy

Area
  - Total: 173.3 km^{2} (66.9 sq mi)
- Elevation: 128 m (420 ft)

Population
  - Total: 1,188
  - Density: 6.855/km^{2} (17.75/sq mi)
- Time zone: UTC+1 (CET)
  - Summer (DST): UTC+2 (CEST)
- Postal Code: 77-140
- Area Code: (+48) 59
- Vehicle registration: GBY
- Website: www.kolczyglowy.pl

Kołczygłowy [kɔu̯t͡ʂɨˈɡwɔvɨ] (German: Alt Kolziglow) is a village in Bytów County, Pomeranian Voivodeship, in northwestern Poland. It is the seat of the gmina (administrative district) called Gmina Kołczygłowy.

The rural church was the place of the marriage of Otto von Bismarck and Johanna von Puttkamer on 28 July 1847.

== Notable people ==
- Czesław Lang (born 1955 in Kołczygłowy) a Polish former road racing cyclist.

== See also ==
- History of Pomerania
