= Barnowo, Pomeranian Voivodeship =

Barnowo
- Village
- Location within Poland
- Coordinates: 54°14′25″N 17°14′36″E
- Country: Poland
- Voivodeship: Pomeranian
- County: Bytów
- Gmina: Kołczygłowy
- Population: 370
- Postal code: 77-140

Barnowo [barˈnɔvɔ] (German: Barnow) is a village in the administrative district of Gmina Kołczygłowy, within Bytów County, Pomeranian Voivodeship, in northern Poland.
