= Miłobądź, Pomeranian Voivodeship =

Miłobądź
- Village
- Location within Poland
- Coordinates: 54°8′8″N 17°12′19″E
- Country: Poland
- Voivodeship: Pomeranian
- County: Bytów
- Gmina: Kołczygłowy

Miłobądź [miˈwɔbɔnt͡ɕ] is a village in the administrative district of Gmina Kołczygłowy, within Bytów County, Pomeranian Voivodeship, in northern Poland.

For details of the history of the region, see History of Pomerania.
