= Dolenje Karteljevo =

- Location in Slovenia
- Coordinates: 45°51′52.16″N 15°8′31.84″E
- Country: Slovenia
- Traditional region: Lower Carniola
- Statistical region: Southeast Slovenia
- Municipality: Novo Mesto

Area
  - Total: 1.97 km^{2} (0.76 sq mi)
- Elevation: 292.7 m (960 ft)

Population (2026)
  - Total: 29
- Postal code: 8000

Dolenje Karteljevo (pronounced [dɔˈleːnjɛ kaɾtɛˈljeːʋɔ]) is a settlement in the hills north of Novo Mesto in southeastern Slovenia. The entire City Municipality of Novo Mesto lies in the traditional region of Lower Carniola and is now included in the Southeast Slovenia Statistical Region. In January 2026, the population was 125.
