= Alenka Novak =

Slovenian racing cyclist

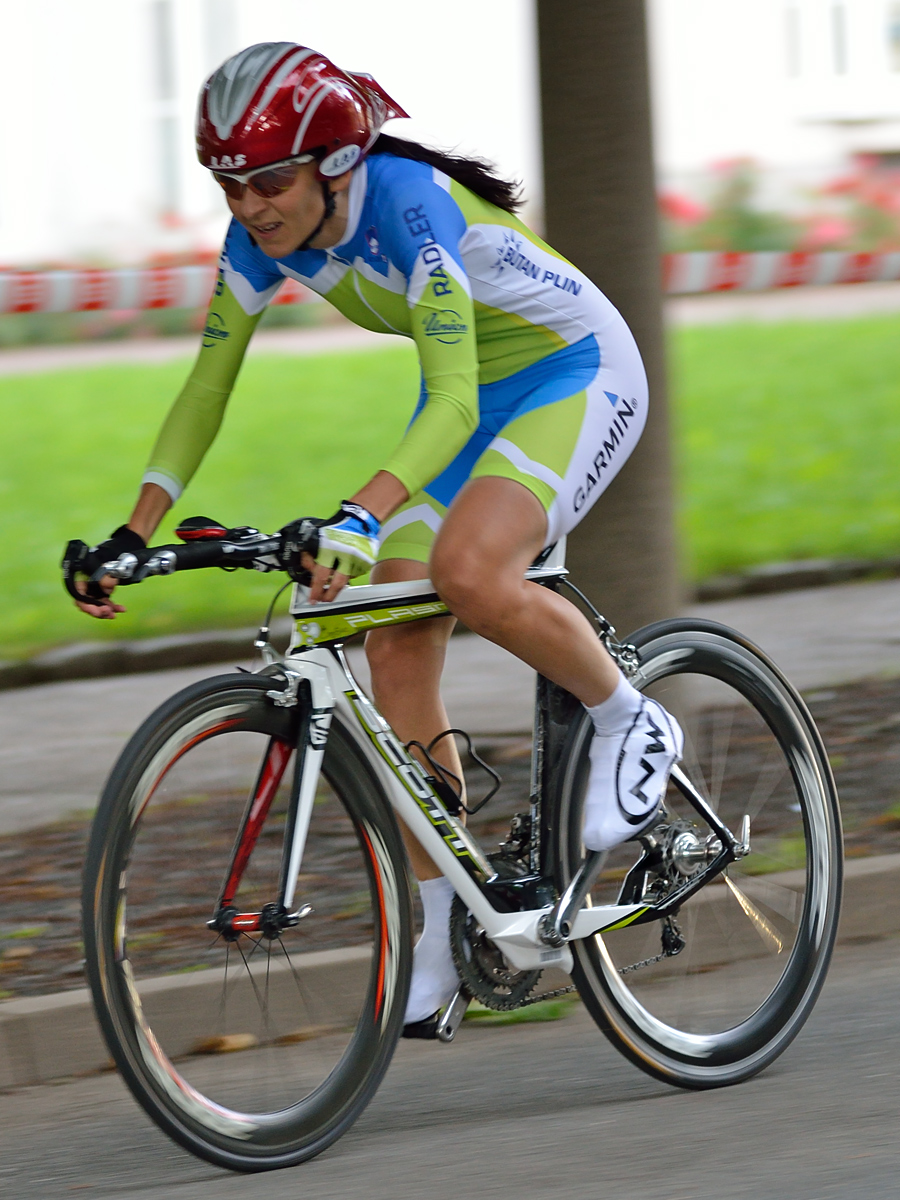
- Novak in 2012

Personal information
- Full name: Alenka Novak
- Born: 17 August 1977 (age 49)

Cycling career
- Sport: Cycling
- Discipline: Road
- Role: Rider

Amateur team
- 2010–2013: Klub Polet Garmin

Professional team
- 2014–2015: BTC City Ljubljana

Alenka Novak (born 17 August 1977) is a Slovenian racing cyclist. A competitor in the 2013 UCI women's time trial in Florence, Novak finished on the podium at the Slovenian National Time Trial Championships on five occasions, with a best finish of second in 2016.
