= Klęskowo, Pomeranian Voivodeship =

Klęskowo
- Settlement
- Location within Poland
- Coordinates: 54°17′5″N 17°17′7″E
- Country: Poland
- Voivodeship: Pomeranian
- County: Bytów
- Gmina: Kołczygłowy

Klęskowo [klɛ̃sˈkɔvɔ] is a settlement in the administrative district of Gmina Kołczygłowy, within Bytów County, Pomeranian Voivodeship, in northern Poland.

For details of the history of the region, see History of Pomerania.
