= Johannes Dürr =

Austrian cross-country skier

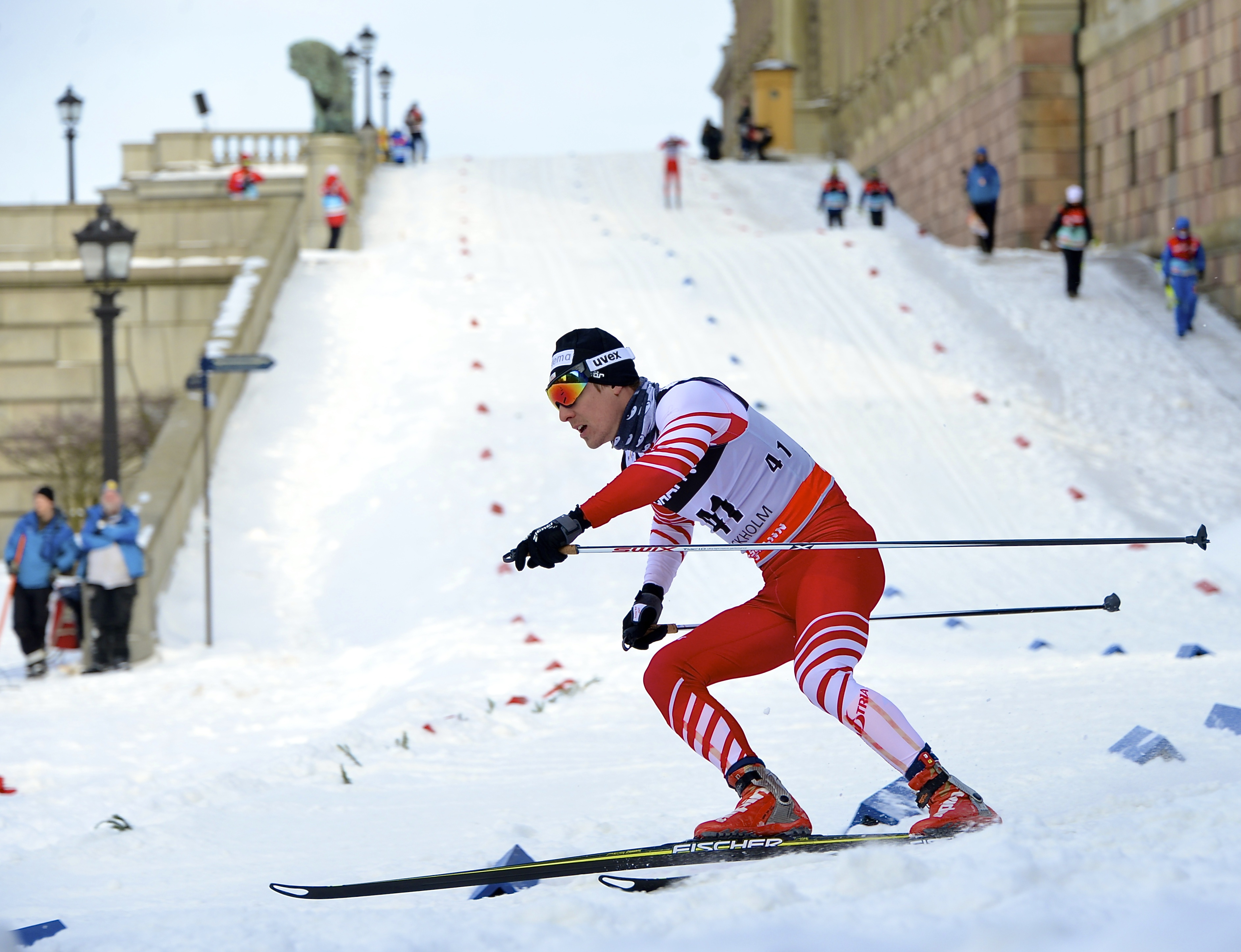

Personal information
- Nationality: Austria
- Born: 12 March 1987 (age 39) Melk, Austria
- Height: 177 cm (5 ft 10 in)

Sport
- Sport: Skiing
- Club: SC Göstling-Hochkar

World Cup career
- Seasons: 2011–2014
- Indiv. starts: 43
- Indiv. podiums: 0
- Team starts: 1
- Team podiums: 0
- Overall titles: 0 – (45th in 2013)
- Discipline titles: 0
Medal record
Men's cross-country skiing
Representing Austria
Junior World Championships
Bronze medal – third place	2007 Tarvisio	4 × 5 km relay

Johannes Dürr (born 12 March 1987) is an Austrian cross-country skier. He has competed in FIS Cross-Country World Cup since 2011. His best result was at the Tour de Ski is third place in season 2013–14, but he was disqualified after he admitted to have been using Erythropoietin (EPO).

During the 2014 Winter Olympics Dürr finished eighth in the skiathlon. He went home to Austria to train for the 50 km run but tested positive for EPO just days before the race. He was subsequently disqualified from the skiathlon race.

== Olympic results ==
Year	Age	15 km individual	30 km skiathlon	50 km mass start	Sprint	4 × 10 km relay	Team sprint
2014	26	—	DSQ	—	—	—	—

== World Championship results ==
Year	Age	15 km individual	30 km skiathlon	50 km mass start	Sprint	4 × 10 km relay	Team sprint
2011	24	—	—	64	—	—	—
2013	26	43	15	—	—	—	—

== World Cup results ==
All results are sourced from the International Ski Federation (FIS).

=== World Cup standings ===
Season	Age	Season standings			Ski Tour standings		
Season	Age	Overall	Distance	Sprint	Nordic Opening	Tour de Ski	World Cup Final
2011	24	NC	NC	NC	DNP	DNF	DNP
2012	25	NC	NC	NC	DNP	DNF	DNP
2013	26	45	35	NC	DNP	24	26
2014	27	DSQ	DSQ	DSQ	DSQ	DSQ	DNP
