= Tjaša Rutar =

Slovenian cyclist

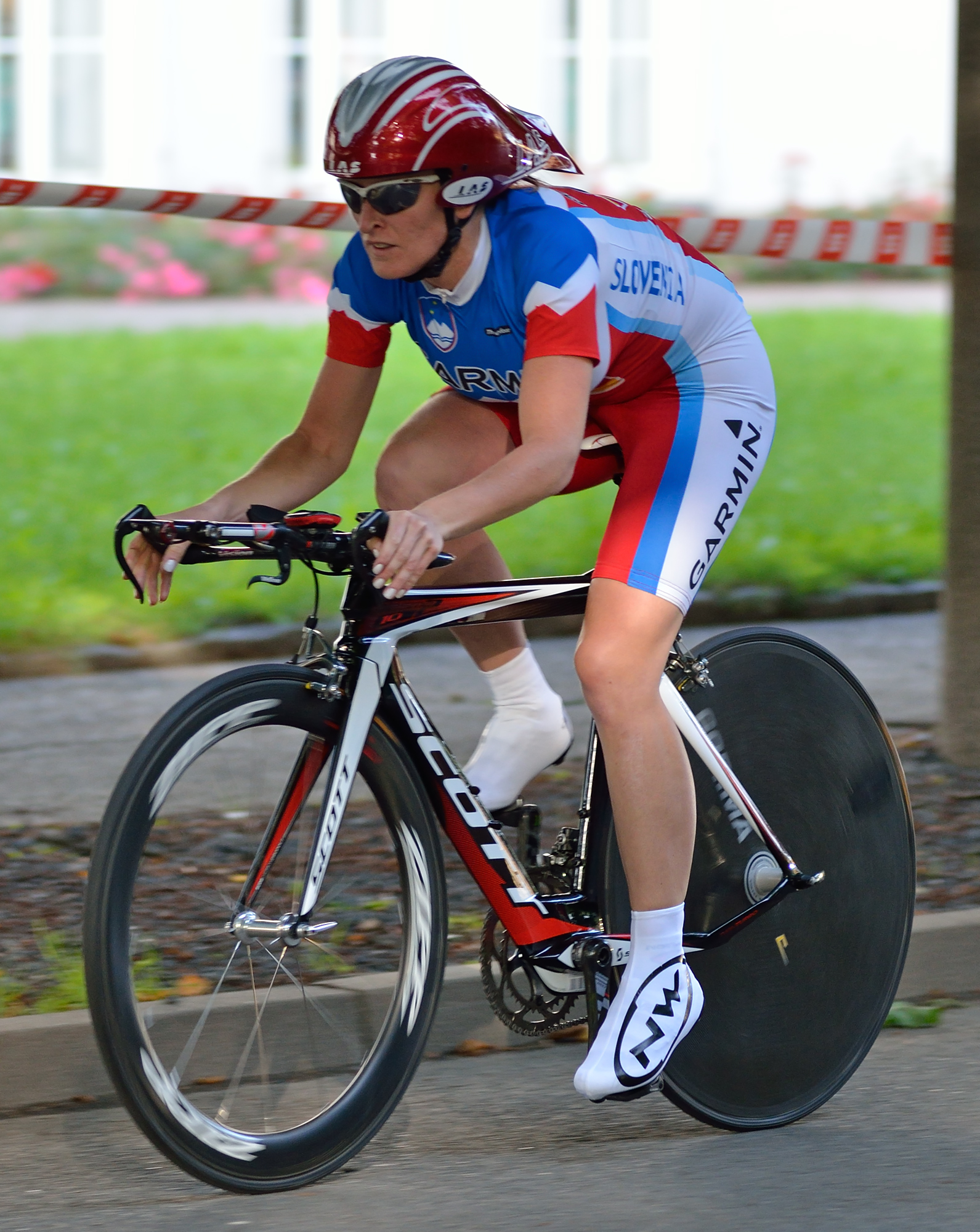
- Rutar in 2012

Personal information
- Born: 10 December 1984 (age 41) Slovenia

Cycling career
- Sport: Cycling
- Discipline: Road cycling

Professional team
- 2014: BTC City Ljubljana

Tjaša Rutar (born 10 December 1984) is a road cyclist from Slovenia. She participated at the 2011 UCI Road World Championships and 2012 UCI Road World Championships.
