= 2019 Tour of Bihor =

2019 UCI Europe Tour

Race details
- Dates: 6–9 June
- Stages: 4
- Distance: 504.0 km (313.2 mi)
- Winning time: 12h 12' 44"

Results
Jersey awarded to the overall winner	Winner	Daniel Muñoz (COL)	(Androni Giocattoli–Sidermec)
	Second	Markus Freiberger (AUT)	(Hrinkow Advarics Cycleang)
	Third	Karel Hník (CZE)	(Elkov–Author)
Jersey awarded to the points classification winner	Points	Marko Kump (SVN)	(Adria Mobil)
Jersey awarded to the mountains classification winner	Mountains	Daniel Muñoz (COL)	(Androni Giocattoli–Sidermec)
	Team	Elkov–Author	

The 2019 Tour of Bihor was the 4th edition of the Tour of Bihor, between 6 and 9 June 2019. The tour was rated as a 2.1 event, as part of the 2019 UCI Europe Tour.

== Route ==
Stages of the 2019 Tour of Bihor
Stage	Date	Route	Distance	Type	Winner
1	7 June	Oradea to Oradea (via Salonta)	163 km (101.3 mi)	Plain stage	(Slovenia) Marko Kump
2a	8 June	Oradea	2 km (1.2 mi)	Individual time trial	(Serbia) Dušan Rajović
2b	8 June	Oradea to Padiș	156 km (96.9 mi)	Mountain stage	(Colombia) Daniel Muñoz
3	9 June	Oradea to Oradea (via Marghita)	183 km (113.7 mi)	Hilly stage	(Czech Republic) Alois Kaňkovský
Total			504 km (313.2 mi)		

== Teams ==
Twenty teams were invited to start the race. These included one UCI Professional Continental, sixteen UCI Continental teams and three national teams.

UCI Professional Continental teams

- Androni Giocattoli–Sidermec

UCI Continental teams

- Adria Mobil
- Apple Team
- Team BridgeLane
- D'Amico–UM Tools
- Elkov–Author
- Team Felbermayr–Simplon Wels
- Cycling Team Friuli
- Giotti Victoria–Palomar
- Hrinkow Advarics Cycleang
- Maloja Pushbikers
- Massi Vivo–Grupo Oresy
- Minsk Cycling Club
- Team Novak
- Sangemini–Trevigiani–MG.K Vis
- Voster ATS Team
- Brunei Continental Cycling Team

National teams

- Romania
- Turkey
- Ukraine

== Stages ==
=== Stage 1 ===
7 June 2019 — Oradea to Oradea (via Salonta), 163 km (101 mi)

Result of Stage 1
Rank	Rider	Team	Time
1	Marko Kump (SVN)	Adria Mobil	3h 54' 39"
2	Matteo Pelucchi (ITA)	Androni Giocattoli–Sidermec	s.t.
3	Leonardo Bonifazio (ITA)	Sangemini–MG.K Vis	s.t.
4	David Per (SVN)	Adria Mobil	s.t.
5	Riccardo Stacchiotti (ITA)	Giotti Victoria–Palomar	s.t.

=== Stage 2a ===
8 June 2019 — Oradea, 2 km (1 mi)

Result of Stage 2a
Rank	Rider	Team	Time
1	Dušan Rajović (SRB)	Adria Mobil	2' 10"
2	Marko Kump (SVN)	Adria Mobil	+ 2"
3	Paweł Franczak (POL)	Voster ATS Team	s.t.
4	Matteo Pelucchi (ITA)	Androni Giocattoli–Sidermec	+ 3"
5	Jodok Salzmann (AUT)	Maloja Pushbikers	+ 4"

General classification after Stage 2a
Rank	Rider	Team	Time
1	Marko Kump (SVN)	Adria Mobil	3h 56' 40"
2	Matteo Pelucchi (ITA)	Androni Giocattoli–Sidermec	+ 6"
3	Dušan Rajović (SRB)	Adria Mobil	+ 9"
4	Paweł Franczak (POL)	Voster ATS Team	+ 11"
5	Jodok Salzmann (AUT)	Maloja Pushbikers	+ 12"

=== Stage 2b ===
8 June 2019 — Oradea to Padiș, 156 km (97 mi)

Result of Stage 2b
Rank	Rider	Team	Time
1	Daniel Muñoz (COL)	Androni Giocattoli–Sidermec	3h 54' 16"
2	Markus Freiberger (AUT)	Hrinkow Advarics Cycleang	+ 19"
3	Karel Hník (CZE)	Elkov–Author	+ 50"
4	Mattia Bais (ITA)	Cycling Team Friuli	s.t.
5	Radoslav Rogina (CRO)	Adria Mobil	s.t.

General classification after Stage 2b
Rank	Rider	Team	Time
1	Daniel Muñoz (COL)	Androni Giocattoli–Sidermec	7h 51' 09"
2	Markus Freiberger (AUT)	Hrinkow Advarics Cycleang	+ 21"
3	Karel Hník (CZE)	Elkov–Author	+ 53"
4	Radoslav Rogina (CRO)	Adria Mobil	s.t.
5	Chris Harper (AUS)	Team BridgeLane	+ 55"

=== Stage 3 ===
9 June 2019 — Oradea to Oradea (via Marghita), 183 km (114 mi)

Result of Stage 3
Rank	Rider	Team	Time
1	Alois Kaňkovský (CZE)	Elkov–Author	4h 21' 35"
2	Marko Kump (SVN)	Adria Mobil	s.t.
3	Riccardo Stacchiotti (ITA)	Giotti Victoria–Palomar	s.t.
4	Daniel Auer (AUT)	Maloja Pushbikers	s.t.
5	Leonardo Bonifazio (ITA)	Sangemini–MG.K Vis	s.t.

General classification after Stage 2B
Rank	Rider	Team	Time
1	Daniel Muñoz (COL)	Androni Giocattoli–Sidermec	12h 12' 44"
2	Markus Freiberger (AUT)	Hrinkow Advarics Cycleang	+ 21"
3	Karel Hník (CZE)	Elkov–Author	+ 53"
4	Radoslav Rogina (CRO)	Adria Mobil	s.t.
5	Chris Harper (AUS)	Team BridgeLane	+ 55"

== Classification leadership table ==
Classification leadership by stage
Stage	Winner	General classification	Points classification	Mountains classification	Young rider classification	Team classification
1	Marko Kump	Marko Kump	Marko Kump	Dominik Hrinkow	Wilmar Molina	Adria Mobil
2A	Dušan Rajović	Marko Kump	Marko Kump	Dominik Hrinkow	Dušan Rajović	Adria Mobil
2B	Daniel Muñoz	Daniel Muñoz	Daniel Muñoz	Daniel Muñoz	Kevin Rivera	Elkov–Author
3	Alois Kaňkovský	Daniel Muñoz	Marko Kump	Daniel Muñoz	Kevin Rivera	Elkov–Author
Final		Daniel Muñoz	Marko Kump	Daniel Muñoz	Kevin Rivera	Elkov–Author

== Standings ==
Legend
Yellow jersey	Denotes the leader of the general classification	White jersey	Denotes the leader of the points classification
Green jersey	Denotes the leader of the mountains classification	Orange jersey	Denotes the leader of the young rider classification

=== General classification ===
General classification (1–10)
Rank	Rider	Team	Time
1	Daniel Muñoz (COL)	Androni Giocattoli–Sidermec	12h 12' 44"
2	Markus Freiberger (AUT)	Hrinkow Advarics Cycleang	+ 0' 21"
3	Karel Hník (CZE)	Elkov–Author	+ 0' 53"
4	Radoslav Rogina (CRO)	Adria Mobil	+ 0' 53"
5	Chris Harper (AUS)	Team BridgeLane	+ 0' 55"
6	Mattia Bais (ITA)	Cycling Team Friuli	+ 0' 55"
7	Benjamin Brkić (AUT)	Team Felbermayr–Simplon Wels	+ 0' 56"
8	Michal Schlegel (CZE)	Elkov–Author	+ 0' 58"
9	Anatoliy Budyak (UKR)	Ukraine	+ 1' 02"
10	Kevin Rivera (CRC)	Androni Giocattoli–Sidermec	+ 1' 08"

Final general classification (11–45)
Rank	Rider	Team	Time
11	Michael Kukrle (CZE)	Elkov–Author	+ 1' 41"
12	Roman Maikin (RUS)	Minsk Cycling Club	+ 1' 45"
13	Hans-Jörg Leopold (AUT)	Maloja Pushbikers	+ 1' 50"
14	Leszek Pluciński (POL)	Voster ATS Team	+ 1' 51"
15	Jacopo Mosca (ITA)	D'Amico–UM Tools	+ 2' 37"
16	Niccolò Salvietti (ITA)	Sangemini–MG.K Vis	+ 2' 39"
17	Paolo Totò (ITA)	Sangemini–MG.K Vis	+ 2' 40"
18	Mateusz Taciak (POL)	Voster ATS Team	+ 2' 41"
19	Andi Bajc (SVN)	Team Felbermayr–Simplon Wels	+ 2' 42"
20	Dominik Neumann (CZE)	Elkov–Author	+ 2' 46"
21	Alessandro Bisolti (ITA)	Androni Giocattoli–Sidermec	+ 4' 10"
22	Žiga Grošelj (SVN)	Adria Mobil	+ 4' 12"
23	Emil Dima (ROU)	Giotti Victoria–Palomar	+ 4' 12"
24	Yauhen Sobal (BLR)	Minsk Cycling Club	+ 4' 13"
25	Felix Ritzinger (AUT)	Maloja Pushbikers	+ 4' 43"
26	Dylan Sunderland (AUS)	Team BridgeLane	+ 5' 05"
27	Yannik Achterberg (GER)	Maloja Pushbikers	+ 5' 29"
28	Vitaliy Buts (UKR)	Ukraine	+ 5' 52"
29	Andriy Vasylyuk (UKR)	Ukraine	+ 5' 54"
30	Antonio Di Sante (ITA)	Sangemini–MG.K Vis	+ 5' 59"
31	František Sisr (CZE)	Elkov–Author	+ 7' 06"
32	Matej Zahálka (CZE)	Elkov–Author	+ 7' 08"
33	Massimo Orlandi (ITA)	Cycling Team Friuli	+ 8' 13"
34	Oleksandr Prevar (UKR)	Ukraine	+ 8' 40"
35	Yegor Dementyev (UKR)	Team Novak	+ 9' 28"
36	Matteo Spreafico (ITA)	Androni Giocattoli–Sidermec	+ 9' 43"
37	Ivan Martinelli (ITA)	D'Amico–UM Tools	+ 9' 47"
38	Stanislau Bazhkou (BLR)	Minsk Cycling Club	+ 9' 51"
39	Vladyslav Soltasiuk (UKR)	Ukraine	+ 10' 20"
40	Johannes Schinnagel (GER)	Maloja Pushbikers	+ 10' 38"
41	Abay Burak (TUR)	Brunei Continental Cycling Team	+ 10' 39"
42	Oleksandr Golovash (UKR)	Ukraine	+ 11' 10"
43	Vladimir Tsoy (KAZ)	Apple Team	+ 11' 15"
44	Marko Kump (SVN)	Adria Mobil	+ 11' 19"
45	Hayden McCormick (AUS)	Team BridgeLane	+ 12' 55"

=== Points classification ===
Points classification (1–10)
Rank	Rider	Team	Points
1	Marko Kump (SVN)	Adria Mobil	37
2	Riccardo Stacchiotti (ITA)	Giotti Victoria–Palomar	26
3	Leonardo Bonifazio (ITA)	Sangemini–MG.K Vis	26
4	Alois Kaňkovský (CZE)	Elkov–Author	25
5	Daniel Muñoz (COL)	Androni Giocattoli–Sidermec	20
6	Markus Freiberger (AUT)	Hrinkow Advarics Cycleang	17
7	Matteo Pelucchi (ITA)	Androni Giocattoli–Sidermec	17
8	Karel Hník (CZE)	Elkov–Author	15
9	David Per (SVN)	Adria Mobil	13
10	Mattia Bais (ITA)	Cycling Team Friuli	13

=== Mountains classification ===
Mountains classification (1–10)
Rank	Rider	Team	Points
1	Daniel Muñoz (COL)	Androni Giocattoli–Sidermec	15
2	Chris Harper (AUS)	Team BridgeLane	10
3	Markus Freiberger (AUT)	Hrinkow Advarics Cycleang	10
4	Andreas Hofer (AUT)	Hrinkow Advarics Cycleang	10
5	Dominik Hrinkow (AUT)	Hrinkow Advarics Cycleang	10
6	Felix Ritzinger (AUT)	Maloja Pushbikers	9
7	Karel Hník (CZE)	Elkov–Author	8
8	Yegor Dementyev (UKR)	Team Novak	8
9	Daniel Lehner (AUT)	Team Felbermayr–Simplon Wels	7
10	Mattia Bais (ITA)	Cycling Team Friuli	6

=== Young rider classification ===
Best young rider classification (1–10)
Rank	Rider	Team	Time
1	Kevin Rivera (CRC)	Androni Giocattoli	12h 13' 52"
2	Emil Dima (ROU)	Giotti Victoria–Palomar	+ 3' 04"
3	Massimo Orlandi (ITA)	Cycling Team Friuli	+ 7' 05"
4	Vladyslav Soltasiuk (UKR)	Ukraine	+ 9' 12"
5	Vladimir Tsoy (KAZ)	Apple Team	+ 10' 07"
6	Daniel Cañas (COL)	Team Novak	+ 12' 42"
7	Jan Koller (AUT)	Felbermayr–Simplon	+ 14' 54"
8	Lukas Reckendorfer (AUT)	Hrinkow Advarics	+ 15' 02"
9	Franco Orocito (ARG)	D'Amico–UM Tools	+ 15' 04"
10	Nicola Venchiarutti (ITA)	Cycling Team Friuli	+ 15' 57"

=== Team classification ===
Team classification (1–10)
Rank	Team	Time
1	(Czech Republic) Elkov–Author (CZE)	36h 41' 38"
2	(Italy) Androni Giocattoli–Sidermec (ITA)	+ 1' 39"
3	(Italy) Sangemini–MG.K Vis (ITA)	+ 7' 50"
4	(Austria) Maloja Pushbikers (AUT)	+ 8' 23"
5	Ukraine (UKR)	+ 9' 22"
6	(Australia) Team BridgeLane (AUS)	+ 10' 58"
7	(Belarus) Minsk Cycling Club (BLR)	+ 12' 15"
8	(Poland) Voster ATS Team (POL)	+ 12' 34"
9	(Slovenia) Adria Mobil (SVN)	+ 13' 01"
10	(Austria) Team Felbermayr–Simplon Wels (AUT)	+ 16' 14"

== See also ==
- 2019 in men's road cycling
- 2019 in sports
