= 2018 Tour of Antalya =

2018 Grand Prix Alanya
- 2018 UCI Europe Tour

Race details
- Dates: 22–25 February 2018
- Stages: 4
- Distance: 450.6 km (280.0 mi)
- Winning time: 11h 07' 59"

Results
	Winner	Artem Ovechkin (RUS)	(Marathon-Tula)
	Second	Cristian Raileanu (MDA)	(Torku Şekerspor)
	Third	Awet Habtom (ERI)	(Polartec–Kometa)

The 2018 Tour of Antalya was the 1st edition of the Tour of Antalya road cycling stage race. It was part of UCI Europe Tour in category 2.2.

== Teams ==
Twenty-five teams were invited to take part in the race. These included two UCI Professional Continental team, twenty UCI Continental teams and three national teams.

UCI Professional Continental teams

- CCC–Sprandi–Polkowice
- Wilier Triestina–Selle Italia

UCI Continental teams

- Synergy Baku
- Minsk Cycling Club
- Team Felbermayr–Simplon Wels
- Leopard Pro Cycling
- Torku Şekerspor
- Tarteletto–Isorex
- Astana City
- Team Sapura Cycling
- Vino–Astana Motors
- Tirol Cycling Team
- Bike Aid
- Monkey Town Continental Team
- Akros–Renfer SA
- Polartec–Kometa
- Apple Team
- Salcano Sakarya
- Brisaspor Cycling Team
- Marathon-Tula
- Salcano Capaddocia
- Eritrel Sport Club

National teams

- Estonia
- Denmark
- Ukraine

== Route ==
Stage schedule
Stage	Date	Route	Distance	Type	Winner
1	22 February	Korkuteli to Korkuteli	158.6 km (99 mi)	Medium-mountain stage	Matteo Moschetti (ITA)
2	23 February	Kemer to Kemer	121.3 km (75 mi)	Mountain stage	Wim Kleiman (NED)
3	24 February	Feslikan to Feslikan	32.5 km (20 mi)	Mountain stage	Artem Ovechkin (RUS)
4	25 February	Side to Lara	146.2 km (91 mi)	Hilly stage	Matteo Moschetti (ITA)

== Stages ==
=== Stage 1 ===
22 February 2018 — Korkuteli to Korkuteli, 158.6 km (99 mi)

Result of Stage 1
Rank	Rider	Team	Time
1	Matteo Moschetti (ITA)	Polartec–Kometa	3h 46' 31"
2	Jakub Mareczko (ITA)	Wilier Triestina–Selle Italia	+ 0"
3	Konrad Gessner (GER)	Leopard Pro Cycling	+ 0"
4	Norman Vahtra (EST)	Estonia	+ 0"
5	Markus Wildauer (AUT)	Tirol Cycling Team	+ 0"
6	Polychronis Tzortzakis (GRE)	Tarteletto–Isorex	+ 0"
7	Filippo Fortin (ITA)	Team Felbermayr–Simplon Wels	+ 0"
8	Alexander Krieger (GER)	Leopard Pro Cycling	+ 0"
9	Meron Abraham (ERI)	Bike Aid	+ 0"
10	Paweł Franczak (POL)	CCC–Sprandi–Polkowice	+ 0"

General classification after Stage 1
Rank	Rider	Team	Time
1	Matteo Moschetti (ITA)	Polartec–Kometa	3h 46' 31"
2	Jakub Mareczko (ITA)	Wilier Triestina–Selle Italia	+ 4"
3	Georg Zimmermann (GER)	Tirol Cycling Team	+ 5"
4	Konrad Gessner (GER)	Leopard Pro Cycling	+ 6"
5	Yauhen Sobal (BLR)	Minsk Cycling Club	+ 6"
6	Ylber Sefa (ALB)	Tarteletto–Isorex	+ 7"
7	Norman Vahtra (EST)	AG2R La Mondiale	+ 10"
8	Markus Wildauer (AUT)	Tirol Cycling Team	+ 10"
9	Polychronis Tzortzakis (GRE)	Tarteletto–Isorex	+ 10"
10	Filippo Fortin (ITA)	Team Felbermayr–Simplon Wels	+ 10"

=== Stage 2 ===
23 February 2018 — Kemer to Kemer, 117 km (73 mi)

Result of Stage 2
Rank	Rider	Team	Time
1	Wim Kleiman (NED)	Monkey Town Continental Team	3h 07' 05"
2	Matthias Krizek (AUT)	Team Felbermayr–Simplon Wels	+ 0"
3	Johannes Schinnagel (GER)	Tirol Cycling Team	+ 0"
4	Markus Wildauer (AUT)	Tirol Cycling Team	+ 0"
5	Mads Rahbek (DEN)	Denmark	+ 0"
6	Cristian Raileanu (MDA)	Torku Şekerspor	+ 0"
7	Paweł Bernas (POL)	CCC–Sprandi–Polkowice	+ 49"
8	Antonio Santoro (ITA)	Monkey Town Continental Team	+ 49"
9	Alexander Krieger (GER)	Leopard Pro Cycling	+ 49"
10	Edoardo Zardini (ITA)	Wilier Triestina–Selle Italia	+ 49"

General classification after Stage 2
Rank	Rider	Team	Time
1	Wim Kleiman (NED)	Monkey Town Continental Team	6h 53' 26"
2	Matthias Krizek (AUT)	Team Felbermayr–Simplon Wels	+ 4"
3	Johannes Schinnagel (GER)	Tirol Cycling Team	+ 6"
4	Markus Wildauer (AUT)	Tirol Cycling Team	+ 9"
5	Mads Rahbek (DEN)	Denmark	+ 10"
6	Cristian Raileanu (MDA)	Torku Şekerspor	+ 0"
7	Alexander Krieger (GER)	Leopard Pro Cycling	+ 59"
8	Ruben Scheire (BEL)	Tarteletto–Isorex	+ 59"
9	Paweł Bernas (POL)	CCC–Sprandi–Polkowice	+ 59"
10	Edoardo Zardini (ITA)	Wilier Triestina–Selle Italia	+ 59"

=== Stage 3 ===
24 February 2018 — Feslikan to Feslikan, 32.5 km (20 mi)

Result of Stage 3
Rank	Rider	Team	Time
1	Artem Ovechkin (RUS)	Marathon-Tula	1h 04' 40"
2	Awet Habtom (ERI)	Polartec–Kometa	+ 42"
3	Edoardo Zardini (ITA)	Wilier Triestina–Selle Italia	+ 44"
4	Ilia Koshevoy (BLR)	Wilier Triestina–Selle Italia	+ 1'01"
5	Cristian Raileanu (MDA)	Torku Şekerspor	+ 1'03"
6	Kevin De Jonghe (BEL)	Tarteletto–Isorex	+ 1'08"
7	Michael Habtom (ERI)	Eritrel Sport Club	+ 1'16"
8	Vadim Pronskiy (KAZ)	Astana City	+ 1'23"
9	Szymon Rekita (POL)	Leopard Pro Cycling	+ 1'30"
10	Benjamin Brkic (AUT)	Tirol Cycling Team	+ 1'35"

General classification after Stage 3
Rank	Rider	Team	Time
1	Artem Ovechkin (RUS)	Marathon-Tula	7h 58' 55"
2	Cristian Raileanu (MDA)	Torku Şekerspor	+ 24"
3	Awet Habtom (ERI)	Polartec–Kometa	+ 46"
4	Edoardo Zardini (ITA)	Wilier Triestina–Selle Italia	+ 50"
5	Wim Kleiman (NED)	Monkey Town Continental Team	+ 1'02"
6	Johannes Schinnagel (GER)	Tirol Cycling Team	+ 1'08"
7	Ilia Koshevoy (BLR)	Wilier Triestina–Selle Italia	+ 1'11"
8	Kevin De Jonghe (BEL)	Tarteletto–Isorex	+ 1'18"
9	Szymon Rekita (POL)	Leopard Pro Cycling	+ 1'40"
10	Benjamin Brkic (AUT)	Tirol Cycling Team	+ 1'45"

=== Stage 4 ===
25 February 2018 — Side to Lara, 123 km (76 mi)

Result of Stage 4
Rank	Rider	Team	Time
1	Matteo Moschetti (ITA)	Polartec–Kometa	3h 09' 04"
2	André Looij (NED)	Monkey Town Continental Team	+ 0"
3	Paweł Franczak (POL)	CCC–Sprandi–Polkowice	+ 0"
4	Alexander Krieger (GER)	Leopard Pro Cycling	+ 0"
5	Filippo Fortin (ITA)	Team Felbermayr–Simplon Wels	+ 0"
6	Yunuz Emre Yilmaz (TUR)	Brisaspor Cycling Team	+ 0"
7	Konrad Gessner (GER)	Leopard Pro Cycling	+ 0"
8	Grigoriy Shtein (KAZ)	Astana City	+ 0"
9	Meron Abraham (ERI)	Bike Aid	+ 0"
10	Markus Wildauer (AUT)	Tirol Cycling Team	+ 0"

General classification after Stage 4
Rank	Rider	Team	Time
1	Artem Ovechkin (RUS)	Marathon-Tula	7h 58' 55"
2	Cristian Raileanu (MDA)	Torku Şekerspor	+ 24"
3	Awet Habtom (ERI)	Polartec–Kometa	+ 46"
4	Edoardo Zardini (ITA)	Wilier Triestina–Selle Italia	+ 50"
5	Wim Kleiman (NED)	Monkey Town Continental Team	+ 1'02"
6	Johannes Schinnagel (GER)	Tirol Cycling Team	+ 1'08"
7	Ilia Koshevoy (BLR)	Wilier Triestina–Selle Italia	+ 1'11"
8	Kevin De Jonghe (BEL)	Tarteletto–Isorex	+ 1'18"
9	Szymon Rekita (POL)	Leopard Pro Cycling	+ 1'40"
10	Benjamin Brkic (AUT)	Tirol Cycling Team	+ 1'45"

== Classification leadership table ==
In the 2018 Tour of Antalya, four different jerseys were awarded for the main classifications. For the general classification, calculated by adding each cyclist's finishing times on each stage, the leader received a pink jersey. This classification was considered the most important of the 2018 Tour of Antalya, and the winner of the classification was considered the winner of the race.

Additionally, there was a points classification, which awarded a yellow jersey. In the points classification, cyclists received points for finishing in the top 5 in a mass-start stage. For winning a stage, a rider earned 5 points, with 4 for second, 3 for third, 2 for fourth and 1 for fifth. Points towards the classification could also be accrued at intermediate sprint points during each stage. The winner of the intermediate sprint earned 5 points, with 4 for second, 3 for third. There was also a mountains classification, the leadership of which was marked by an orange jersey. In the mountains classification, points were won by reaching the top of a climb before other cyclists, with more points available for the higher-categorised climbs. The fourth jersey represented the young rider classification, marked by a white jersey. This was decided in the same way as the general classification, but only riders born after 1 January 1995 were eligible to be ranked in the classification.

Stage	Winner	General classification	Points classification	Mountains classification	Young rider classification	Teams classification
1	Matteo Moschetti	Matteo Moschetti	Georg Zimmermann	Daniel Lehner	Matteo Moschetti	Leopard Pro Cycling
2	Wim Kleiman	Wim Kleiman	Georg Zimmermann	Daniel Lehner	Johannes Schinnagel	Tirol Cycling Team
3	Artem Ovechkin	Artem Ovechkin	Georg Zimmermann	Daniel Lehner	Awet Habtom	Tirol Cycling Team
4	Matteo Moschetti	Artem Ovechkin	Matteo Moschetti	Daniel Lehner	Awet Habtom	Tirol Cycling Team
Final		Artem Ovechkin	Matteo Moschetti	Daniel Lehner	Awet Habtom	Tirol Cycling Team
