= 2019 Adriatica Ionica Race =

2019 UCI Europe Tour

Race details
- Dates: 24 – 28 July 2019
- Stages: 5
- Distance: 815.3 km (506.6 mi)

Results
Jersey awarded to the overall winner	Winner	Mark Padun (UKR)	(Bahrain–Merida)
	Second	Ben Hermans (BEL)	(Israel Cycling Academy)
	Third	James Knox (GBR)	(Deceuninck–Quick-Step)
Jersey awarded to the points classification winner	Points	Álvaro José Hodeg (COL)	(Deceuninck–Quick-Step)
Jersey awarded to the mountains classification winner	Mountains	Ben Hermans (BEL)	(Israel Cycling Academy)
Jersey awarded to the youth classification winner	Youth	Mark Padun (UKR)	(Bahrain–Merida)
	Team	Deceuninck–Quick-Step	

The 2019 Adriatica Ionica Race was a five-stage men's professional road cycling race.

It was the second edition of the Adriatica Ionica Race. The race started on 24 July and finished on 28 July.

The race is part of the UCI Europe Tour, and is categorised by the UCI as a 2.1 race. The previous edition was won by the Colombian rider Iván Sosa (Androni Giocattoli–Sidermec), who, after his transfer to Team Sky, did not return to defend his title. In his absence, Ukrainian Mark Padun (Bahrain–Merida) won the race.

== Teams ==
Nineteen teams of up to seven riders took part in the race:

UCI WorldTeams

- AG2R La Mondiale
- Bahrain–Merida
- Deceuninck–Quick-Step
- EF Education First
- Movistar Team
- Team Dimension Data
- Trek–Segafredo
- UAE Team Emirates

UCI Professional Continental teams

- Androni Giocattoli–Sidermec
- Bardiani–CSF
- Caja Rural–Seguros RGA
- Israel Cycling Academy
- Neri Sottoli–Selle Italia–KTM
- Nippo–Vini Fantini–Faizanè
- Roompot–Charles
- Sport Vlaanderen–Baloise
- Team Novo Nordisk

UCI Continental teams

- Cycling Team Friuli

National Teams

- Italy

== Route ==
The race consisted of five stages totalling 815.3 km (507 mi).

Stage characteristics and winners
Stage	Date	Course	Distance	Type	Winner
1	24 July	Mestre, Venice	83.7 km (52 mi)	Criterium	Phil Bauhaus (GER)
2	25 July	Venice (Favaro Veneto) to Grado	189 km (117 mi)	Flat stage	Álvaro José Hodeg (COL)
3	26 July	Palmanova to Lake Misurina	204.6 km (127 mi)	Mountain stage	Mark Padun (UKR)
4	27 July	Padola to Cormons (Monte Quarin)	204.5 km (127 mi)	Hilly stage	Remco Evenepoel (BEL)
5	28 July	Cormons to Trieste	133.5 km (83 mi)	Flat stage	Álvaro José Hodeg (COL)
	Total		815.3 km (507 mi)		

== Stages ==
=== Stage 1 ===
24 July 2019 - Mestre, Venice, 83.7 km (52 mi), criterium

The criterium on stage 1 featured riders racing a 2.7 km (2 mi) lap, with the best-placed riders completing 31 laps for a total of 83.7 km (52 mi). Though jerseys were awarded after the stage, the times and points accrued during this stage did not count towards the classifications.

Stage 1 result
Rank	Rider	Team	Time
1	Phil Bauhaus (GER)	Bahrain–Merida	1h 43' 36"
2	Álvaro José Hodeg (COL)	Deceuninck–Quick-Step	+ 0"
3	Sep Vanmarcke (BEL)	EF Education First	+ 0"
4	Davide Martinelli (ITA)	Deceuninck–Quick-Step	+ 0"
5	Sacha Modolo (ITA)	EF Education First	+ 0"
6	Boy van Poppel (NED)	Roompot–Charles	+ 0"
7	Mikkel Frølich Honoré (DEN)	Deceuninck–Quick-Step	+ 0"
8	Roberto Ferrari (ITA)	UAE Team Emirates	+ 0"
9	Rui Oliveira (POR)	UAE Team Emirates	+ 0"
10	Florian Sénéchal (FRA)	Deceuninck–Quick-Step	+ 0"

General classification after stage 1
Rank	Rider	Team	Time
1	Phil Bauhaus (GER)	Bahrain–Merida	1h 43' 36"
2	Álvaro José Hodeg (COL)	Deceuninck–Quick-Step	+ 0"
3	Sep Vanmarcke (BEL)	EF Education First	+ 0"
4	Davide Martinelli (ITA)	Deceuninck–Quick-Step	+ 0"
5	Sacha Modolo (ITA)	EF Education First	+ 0"
6	Boy van Poppel (NED)	Roompot–Charles	+ 0"
7	Mikkel Frølich Honoré (DEN)	Deceuninck–Quick-Step	+ 0"
8	Roberto Ferrari (ITA)	UAE Team Emirates	+ 0"
9	Rui Oliveira (POR)	UAE Team Emirates	+ 0"
10	Florian Sénéchal (FRA)	Deceuninck–Quick-Step	+ 0"

=== Stage 2 ===
25 July 2019 - Venice (Favaro Veneto) to Grado, 189 km (117 mi)

Stage 2 result
Rank	Rider	Team	Time
1	Álvaro José Hodeg (COL)	Deceuninck–Quick-Step	4h 09' 58"
2	Florian Sénéchal (FRA)	Deceuninck–Quick-Step	+ 0"
3	Philippe Gilbert (BEL)	Deceuninck–Quick-Step	+ 0"
4	Sacha Modolo (ITA)	EF Education First	+ 0"
5	Heinrich Haussler (AUS)	Bahrain–Merida	+ 0"
6	Sjoerd van Ginneken (NED)	Roompot–Charles	+ 0"
7	Marco Canola (ITA)	Nippo–Vini Fantini–Faizanè	+ 0"
8	Rui Oliveira (POR)	UAE Team Emirates	+ 0"
9	Jordi Warlop (BEL)	Sport Vlaanderen–Baloise	+ 0"
10	Dmitriy Gruzdev (KAZ)	Astana	+ 0"

General classification after stage 2
Rank	Rider	Team	Time
1	Álvaro José Hodeg (COL)	Deceuninck–Quick-Step	4h 09' 48"
2	Florian Sénéchal (FRA)	Deceuninck–Quick-Step	+ 4"
3	Philippe Gilbert (BEL)	Deceuninck–Quick-Step	+ 6"
4	Sacha Modolo (ITA)	EF Education First	+ 10"
5	Heinrich Haussler (AUS)	Bahrain–Merida	+ 10"
6	Sjoerd van Ginneken (NED)	Roompot–Charles	+ 10"
7	Rui Oliveira (POR)	UAE Team Emirates	+ 10"
8	Jordi Warlop (BEL)	Sport Vlaanderen–Baloise	+ 10"
9	Dmitriy Gruzdev (KAZ)	Astana	+ 10"
10	Eduard Prades (ESP)	Movistar Team	+ 10"

=== Stage 3 ===
26 July 2019 - Palmanova to Lake Misurina, 204.6 km (127 mi)

Stage 3 result
Rank	Rider	Team	Time
1	Mark Padun (UKR)	Bahrain–Merida	5h 54' 16"
2	Dayer Quintana (COL)	Neri Sottoli–Selle Italia–KTM	+ 0"
3	Ben Hermans (BEL)	Israel Cycling Academy	+ 0"
4	Jonathan Caicedo (ECU)	EF Education First	+ 0"
5	James Knox (GBR)	Deceuninck–Quick-Step	+ 5"
6	Matteo Badilatti (SUI)	Israel Cycling Academy	+ 41"
7	Nicola Conci (ITA)	Trek–Segafredo	+ 1' 07"
8	Jan Polanc (SLO)	UAE Team Emirates	+ 1' 17"
9	Remco Evenepoel (BEL)	Deceuninck–Quick-Step	+ 1' 31"
10	Daniel Muñoz (COL)	Androni Giocattoli–Sidermec	+ 2' 28"

General classification after stage 3
Rank	Rider	Team	Time
1	Mark Padun (UKR)	Bahrain–Merida	10h 04' 04"
2	Ben Hermans (BEL)	Israel Cycling Academy	+ 6"
3	Jonathan Caicedo (ECU)	EF Education First	+ 10"
4	James Knox (GBR)	Deceuninck–Quick-Step	+ 15"
5	Nicola Conci (ITA)	Trek–Segafredo	+ 1' 17"
6	Dayer Quintana (COL)	Neri Sottoli–Selle Italia–KTM	+ 1' 32"
7	Jan Polanc (SLO)	UAE Team Emirates	+ 2' 55"
8	Remco Evenepoel (BEL)	Deceuninck–Quick-Step	+ 3' 09"
9	Daniel Muñoz (COL)	Androni Giocattoli–Sidermec	+ 4' 06"
10	Mikkel Frølich Honoré (DEN)	Deceuninck–Quick-Step	+ 5' 20"

=== Stage 4 ===
27 July 2019 - Padola to Cormòns (Monte Quarin), 204.5 km (127 mi)

Stage 4 result
Rank	Rider	Team	Time
1	Remco Evenepoel (BEL)	Deceuninck–Quick-Step	4h 50' 19"
2	Philippe Gilbert (BEL)	Deceuninck–Quick-Step	+ 2' 13"
3	Maurits Lammertink (NED)	Roompot–Charles	+ 2' 13"
4	Ben Hermans (BEL)	Israel Cycling Academy	+ 2' 13"
5	James Knox (GBR)	Deceuninck–Quick-Step	+ 2' 13"
6	Mark Padun (UKR)	Bahrain–Merida	+ 2' 13"
7	Eduard Prades (ESP)	Movistar Team	+ 2' 13"
8	Jan Polanc (SLO)	UAE Team Emirates	+ 2' 13"
9	Nicola Conci (ITA)	Trek–Segafredo	+ 2' 13"
10	Dayer Quintana (COL)	Neri Sottoli–Selle Italia–KTM	+ 2' 23"

General classification after stage 4
Rank	Rider	Team	Time
1	Mark Padun (UKR)	Bahrain–Merida	14h 56' 36"
2	Ben Hermans (BEL)	Israel Cycling Academy	+ 6"
3	James Knox (GBR)	Deceuninck–Quick-Step	+ 15"
4	Jonathan Caicedo (ECU)	EF Education First	+ 20"
5	Remco Evenepoel (BEL)	Deceuninck–Quick-Step	+ 46"
6	Nicola Conci (ITA)	Trek–Segafredo	+ 1' 17"
7	Dayer Quintana (COL)	Neri Sottoli–Selle Italia–KTM	+ 1' 42"
8	Jan Polanc (SLO)	UAE Team Emirates	+ 2' 55"
9	Daniel Muñoz (COL)	Androni Giocattoli–Sidermec	+ 4' 25"
10	Mikkel Frølich Honoré (DEN)	Deceuninck–Quick-Step	+ 5' 50"

=== Stage 5 ===
28 July 2019 - Cormòns to Trieste, 133.5 km (83 mi)

Stage 5 result
Rank	Rider	Team	Time
1	Álvaro José Hodeg (COL)	Deceuninck–Quick-Step	2h 10' 02"
2	Edward Theuns (BEL)	Trek–Segafredo	+ 0"
3	Sacha Modolo (ITA)	EF Education First	+ 0"
4	Florian Sénéchal (FRA)	Deceuninck–Quick-Step	+ 0"
5	Jordi Warlop (BEL)	Sport Vlaanderen–Baloise	+ 0"
6	Yevgeniy Gidich (KAZ)	Astana	+ 0"
7	Alberto Dainese (ITA)	Italy	+ 0"
8	Simone Velasco (ITA)	Neri Sottoli–Selle Italia–KTM	+ 0"
9	Matteo Malucelli (ITA)	Caja Rural–Seguros RGA	+ 0"
10	Ryan Gibbons (RSA)	Team Dimension Data	+ 0"

General classification after stage 5
Rank	Rider	Team	Time
1	Mark Padun (UKR)	Bahrain–Merida	17h 06' 45"
2	Ben Hermans (BEL)	Israel Cycling Academy	+ 15"
3	James Knox (GBR)	Deceuninck–Quick-Step	+ 24"
4	Jonathan Caicedo (ECU)	EF Education First	+ 29"
5	Nicola Conci (ITA)	Trek–Segafredo	+ 1' 26"
6	Dayer Quintana (COL)	Neri Sottoli–Selle Italia–KTM	+ 1' 42"
7	Jan Polanc (SLO)	UAE Team Emirates	+ 2' 58"
8	Remco Evenepoel (BEL)	Deceuninck–Quick-Step	+ 4' 20"
9	Daniel Muñoz (COL)	Androni Giocattoli–Sidermec	+ 4' 34"
10	Mikkel Frølich Honoré (DEN)	Deceuninck–Quick-Step	+ 5' 59"

== Classification leadership ==
In the 2019 Adriatica Ionica Race, five jerseys were awarded. The general classification was calculated by adding each cyclist's finishing times on each stage. Time bonuses were awarded to the first three finishers on all stages apart from the time trial stage. The first three riders would get 10, 6, and 4 seconds, respectively. The leader of the general classification received a blue jersey sponsored by Geo&tex2000. This classification was considered the most important of the 2018 Adriatica Ionica, and the winner of the classification was considered the winner of the race.

Points classification points for the top 10 positions by type
Type	1	2	3	4	5	6	7	8	9	10
Flat stage	25	18	12	8	6	5	4	3	2	1
High mountain stage	15	12	9	7	6	5	4	3	2	1
Intermediate sprint	10	6	3	2	1	0				
Team time trial	0									

The second classification was the points classification. Riders were awarded points for finishing in the top ten in a stage. Points were also won in intermediate sprints; ten points for crossing the sprint line first, six points for second place, three for third, two for fourth, and a single point for fifth. The leader of the points classification was awarded a red jersey sponsored by Full Speed Ahead.

Points for the mountains classification
Position	1	2	3	4	5
Points for H.C category	10	8	6	4	2
Points for Category 1	8	6	4	2	1
Points for Category 2	5	3	2	0	
Points for Category 3	3	2	1	0	

The third classification was the mountains classification. Points were awarded to the riders that reached the summit of the most difficult climbs first. The climbs were categorized, in order of increasing difficulty, as third-, second-, and first-category and hors catégorie (read: "beyond category"). The leadership of the mountains classification was marked by a green sponsored by Dolomiti.

The fourth jersey represented the young rider classification, marked by a white jersey sponsored by Gabetti. Only riders born after 1 January 1993 were eligible; the young rider best placed in the general classification was the leader of the young rider classification.

The final classification was the "Fighting Spirit Prize" given after each stage to the rider considered, by a jury, to have "who struggled in order to achieve results in all the competitive moments of the race or the one who take action to start or carry out the longest breakaway". The winner wore an orange jersey sponsored by Suzuki. There was also a classification for teams, in which the times of the best three cyclists in a team on each stage were added together; the leading team at the end of the race was the team with the lowest cumulative time.

Classification leadership by stage
Stage	Winner	General classification	Points classification	Mountains classification	Young rider classification	Combativity classification	Team classification
1	Phil Bauhaus	Phil Bauhaus	Enrico Barbin	not awarded	Álvaro José Hodeg	Danilo Wyss	Deceuninck–Quick-Step
2	Álvaro José Hodeg	Álvaro José Hodeg	Álvaro José Hodeg	not awarded	Álvaro José Hodeg	Etienne van Empel	Deceuninck–Quick-Step
3	Mark Padun	Mark Padun	Álvaro José Hodeg	Ben Hermans	Mark Padun	Mattia Bais	Deceuninck–Quick-Step
4	Remco Evenepoel	Mark Padun	Remco Evenepoel	Ben Hermans	Mark Padun	Fausto Masnada	Deceuninck–Quick-Step
5	Álvaro José Hodeg	Mark Padun	Álvaro José Hodeg	Ben Hermans	Mark Padun	Thimo Willems	Deceuninck–Quick-Step
Final		Mark Padun	Álvaro José Hodeg	Ben Hermans	Mark Padun	No award	Deceuninck–Quick-Step

- In stage 3, Florian Sénéchal, who was second in the points classification, wore the red jersey, because first placed Álvaro José Hodeg wore the blue jersey as leader of the general classification.
- In stage 3, Rui Oliveira, who was second in the best young rider classification, wore the white jersey, because first placed Álvaro José Hodeg wore the blue jersey as leader of the general classification.
- In stage 4, Nicola Conci, who was second in the best young rider classification, wore the white jersey, because first placed Mark Padun wore the blue jersey as leader of the general classification.
- In stage 5, Nicola Conci, who was third in the best young rider classification, wore the white jersey, because first placed Mark Padun wore the blue jersey as leader of the general classification and second placed Remco Evenepoel wore the red jersey as leader of the points classification.

== Final standings ==
Legend
General classification	Denotes the winner of the general classification	Points classification	Denotes the leader of the points classification
Mountains classification	Denotes the leader of the mountains classification	Young rider classification	Denotes the winner of the young rider classification

=== General classification ===
Final general classification (1–10)
Rank	Rider	Team	Time
1	Mark Padun (UKR)	Bahrain–Merida	17h 06' 45"
2	Ben Hermans (BEL)	Israel Cycling Academy	+ 15"
3	James Knox (GBR)	Deceuninck–Quick-Step	+ 24"
4	Jonathan Caicedo (ECU)	EF Education First	+ 29"
5	Nicola Conci (ITA)	Trek–Segafredo	+ 1' 26"
6	Dayer Quintana (COL)	Neri Sottoli–Selle Italia–KTM	+ 1' 42"
7	Jan Polanc (SLO)	UAE Team Emirates	+ 2' 58"
8	Remco Evenepoel (BEL)	Deceuninck–Quick-Step	+ 4' 20"
9	Daniel Muñoz (COL)	Androni Giocattoli–Sidermec	+ 4' 34"
10	Mikkel Frølich Honoré (DEN)	Deceuninck–Quick-Step	+ 5' 59"

=== Points classification ===
Final points classification (1–10)
Rank	Rider	Team	Points
1	Álvaro José Hodeg (COL)	Deceuninck–Quick-Step	50
2	Remco Evenepoel (BEL)	Deceuninck–Quick-Step	37
3	Philippe Gilbert (BEL)	Deceuninck–Quick-Step	30
4	Florian Sénéchal (FRA)	Deceuninck–Quick-Step	26
5	Mark Padun (UKR)	Bahrain–Merida	22
6	Dmitriy Gruzdev (KAZ)	Astana	21
7	Sacha Modolo (ITA)	EF Education First	20
8	Edward Theuns (BEL)	Trek–Segafredo	18
9	Ben Hermans (BEL)	Israel Cycling Academy	17
10	Dayer Quintana (COL)	Neri Sottoli–Selle Italia–KTM	13

=== Mountains classification ===
Final mountains classification (1–10)
Rank	Rider	Team	Points
1	Ben Hermans (BEL)	Israel Cycling Academy	16
2	Mark Padun (UKR)	Bahrain–Merida	13
3	James Knox (GBR)	Deceuninck–Quick-Step	13
4	Dayer Quintana (COL)	Neri Sottoli–Selle Italia–KTM	12
5	Matteo Badilatti (SUI)	Israel Cycling Academy	10
6	Remco Evenepoel (BEL)	Deceuninck–Quick-Step	9
7	Philippe Gilbert (BEL)	Deceuninck–Quick-Step	7
8	Fausto Masnada (ITA)	Androni Giocattoli–Sidermec	5
9	Mads Pedersen (DEN)	Trek–Segafredo	5
10	Jonathan Caicedo (ECU)	EF Education First	4

=== Young rider classification ===
Final young rider classification (1–10)
Rank	Rider	Team	Time
1	Mark Padun (UKR)	Bahrain–Merida	17h 06' 45"
2	Nicola Conci (ITA)	Trek–Segafredo	+ 1' 26"
3	Remco Evenepoel (BEL)	Deceuninck–Quick-Step	+ 4' 20"
4	Daniel Muñoz (COL)	Androni Giocattoli–Sidermec	+ 4' 34"
5	Mikkel Frølich Honoré (DEN)	Deceuninck–Quick-Step	+ 5' 59"
6	Jonas Gregaard (DEN)	Astana	+ 7' 14"
7	Mattia Bais (ITA)	Cycling Team Friuli	+ 24' 34"
8	Joan Bou (ESP)	Nippo–Vini Fantini–Faizanè	+ 26' 21"
9	Yuriy Natarov (KAZ)	Astana	+ 26' 51"
10	Kevin Rivera (CRC)	Androni Giocattoli–Sidermec	+ 31' 15"

=== Team classification ===
Final team classification (1–10)
Rank	Team	Time
1	Deceuninck–Quick-Step	51h 25' 13"
2	Neri Sottoli–Selle Italia–KTM	+ 23' 09"
3	Androni Giocattoli–Sidermec	+ 24' 37"
4	Trek–Segafredo	+ 42' 47"
5	Israel Cycling Academy	+ 49' 10"
6	Astana	+ 51' 58"
7	Movistar Team	+ 56' 46"
8	UAE Team Emirates	+ 1h 02' 24"
9	EF Education First	+ 1h 03' 20"
10	Bahrain–Merida	+ 1h 04' 22"
