= 2018 UCI Road World Championships – Men's team time trial =

Men's team time trial
2018 UCI Road World Championships

Race details
- Dates: 23 September 2018
- Stages: 1
- Distance: 62.4 km (38.8 mi)
- Winning time: 1h 07' 25.94"

Medalists
	Gold	Quick-Step Floors
	Silver	Team Sunweb
	Bronze	BMC Racing Team

The Men's team time trial of the 2018 UCI Road World Championships was a cycling event that took place on 23 September 2018 in Innsbruck, Austria. It was the 34th edition of the championship, and the 7th since its reintroduction for trade teams in 2012. German team Team Sunweb were the defending champions, having won in 2017. 22 teams and 132 riders entered the competition.

The race was won for the first time since 2016 by Quick-Step Floors, finishing 18.46 seconds clear of the defending champions, Team Sunweb, while the BMC Racing Team completed the podium, a further 1.09 seconds in arrears.

== Course ==
The race consisted of a route 62.4 kilometres (38.8 miles) in length, starting from Ötztal and ending in Innsbruck. The route was primarily rolling, except for a climb of 4.5 kilometres (2.8 miles) between Kematen in Tirol and Axams, with an average 5.5% gradient and maximum of 13% in places.

== Final classification ==
All twenty-two teams completed the 62.4-kilometre (38.8 mi)-long course.

Rank	Team	Riders	Time
1	(Belgium) Quick-Step Floors	Kasper Asgreen (DEN); Laurens De Plus (BEL); Bob Jungels (LUX); Yves Lampaert (BEL); Maximilian Schachmann (GER); Niki Terpstra (NED)	1h 07' 25.94"
2	(Germany) Team Sunweb	Tom Dumoulin (NED); Chad Haga (USA); Wilco Kelderman (NED); Søren Kragh Andersen (DEN); Michael Matthews (AUS); Sam Oomen (NED)	+ 18.46"
3	(United States) BMC Racing Team	Patrick Bevin (NZL); Damiano Caruso (ITA); Rohan Dennis (AUS); Stefan Küng (SUI); Greg Van Avermaet (BEL); Tejay van Garderen (USA)	+ 19.55"
4	(United Kingdom) Team Sky	Jonathan Castroviejo (ESP); Owain Doull (GBR); Vasil Kiryienka (BLR); Michał Kwiatkowski (POL); Gianni Moscon (ITA); Ian Stannard (GBR)	+ 44.96"
5	(Australia) Mitchelton–Scott	Jack Bauer (NZL); Luke Durbridge (AUS); Michael Hepburn (AUS); Daryl Impey (RSA); Cameron Meyer (AUS); Matteo Trentin (ITA)	+ 56.68"
6	(Spain) Movistar Team	Andrey Amador (CRC); Winner Anacona (COL); Imanol Erviti (ESP); Nelson Oliveira (POR); Marc Soler (ESP); Jasha Sütterlin (GER)	+ 1' 31.70"
7	(United States) Trek–Segafredo	Julien Bernard (FRA); Matthias Brändle (AUT); Fabio Felline (ITA); Michael Gogl (AUT); Ryan Mullen (IRL); Toms Skujiņš (LAT)	+ 2' 03.97"
8	(Germany) Bora–Hansgrohe	Maciej Bodnar (POL); Felix Großschartner (AUT); Patrick Konrad (AUT); Gregor Mühlberger (AUT); Daniel Oss (ITA); Lukas Pöstlberger (AUT)	+ 2' 07.24"
9	(Poland) CCC–Sprandi–Polkowice	Kamil Gradek (POL); Adrian Kurek (POL); Łukasz Owsian (POL); Szymon Sajnok (POL); Mateusz Taciak (POL); Jan Tratnik (SLO)	+ 2' 37.44"
10	(Kazakhstan) Astana	Magnus Cort (DEN); Hugo Houle (CAN); Andriy Hrivko (UKR); Tanel Kangert (EST); Alexey Lutsenko (KAZ); Michael Valgren (DEN)	+ 2' 53.79"
11	(Switzerland) Team Katusha–Alpecin	Alex Dowsett (GBR); Nathan Haas (AUS); Reto Hollenstein (SUI); Tony Martin (GER); Nils Politt (GER); Mads Würtz Schmidt (DEN)	+ 2' 55.34"
12	(Czech Republic) Elkov–Author	Jan Bárta (CZE); Josef Černý (CZE); Vojtěch Hačecký (CZE); Alois Kaňkovský (CZE); Michael Kukrle (CZE); Jakub Otruba (CZE)	+ 3' 17.44"
13	(Netherlands) LottoNL–Jumbo	Koen Bouwman (NED); Tom Leezer (NED); Neilson Powless (USA); Timo Roosen (NED); Jos van Emden (NED); Danny van Poppel (NED)	+ 3' 28.05"
14	(Austria) Team Vorarlberg Santic	Gian Friesecke (SUI); Daniel Geismayr (AUT); Davide Orrico (ITA); Lukas Rüegg (SUI); Patrick Schelling (SUI); Jannik Steimle (GER)	+ 4' 46.99"
15	(France) AG2R La Mondiale	Gediminas Bagdonas (LTU); François Bidard (FRA); Nico Denz (GER); Silvan Dillier (SUI); Alexandre Geniez (FRA); Alexis Gougeard (FRA)	+ 5' 18.50"
16	(Austria) Team Felbermayr–Simplon Wels	Filippo Fortin (ITA); Matthias Krizek (AUT); Daniel Lehner (AUT); Matthias Mangertseder (GER); Stephan Rabitsch (AUT); Riccardo Zoidl (AUT)	+ 5' 39.47"
17	(Austria) Tirol Cycling Team	Tobias Bayer (AUT); Florian Gamper (AUT); Mario Gamper (AUT); Manuel Porzner (GER); Johannes Schinnagel (GER); Georg Zimmermann (GER)	+ 6' 24.97"
18	(Austria) Hrinkow Advarics Cycleang	Patrick Bosman (AUT); Markus Freiberger (AUT); Andreas Graf (AUT); Andreas Hofer (AUT); Dominik Hrinkow (AUT); Jonas Rapp (GER)	+ 7' 02.77"
19	(Italy) Sangemini–MG.K Vis Vega	Nicola Gaffurini (ITA); Michele Gazzara (ITA); Dario Puccioni (ITA); Niccolò Salvietti (ITA); Michele Scartezzini (ITA); Paolo Totò (ITA)	+ 7' 05.29"
20	(Germany) Team Lotto–Kern Haus	Luca Henn (GER); Jan Hugger (GER); Joshua Huppertz (GER); Robert Kessler (GER); Jonas Rutsch (GER); Daniel Westmattelmann (GER)	+ 7' 33.42"
21	(Slovakia) Dukla Banská Bystrica	Juraj Bellan (SVK); Marek Čanecký (SVK); Ján Andrej Cully (SVK); Martin Mahďar (SVK); Samuel Oros (SVK); Patrik Tybor (SVK)	+ 8' 10.00"
22	(Austria) WSA–Pushbikers	Daniel Auer (AUT); Christian Grasmann (GER); Joshua Harrison (AUS); Felix Ritzinger (AUT); Jodok Salzmann (AUT); Helmut Trettwer (GER)	+ 8' 39.49"
