= Markus Freiberger =

Austrian cyclist

Personal information
- Full name: Markus Freiberger
- Born: 19 December 1995 (age 30)

Cycling career
- Sport: Cycling
- Current team: Hrinkow Advarics
- Discipline: Road
- Role: Rider

Professional teams
- 2015–2017: Tirol Cycling Team
- 2018–2022: Hrinkow Advarics Cycleang

Markus Freiberger (born 19 December 1995) is an Austrian former racing cyclist, who competed as a professional from 2015 to 2022. He rode for Hrinkow Advarics Cycleang in the men's team time trial event at the 2018 UCI Road World Championships.

== Major results ==
2015
1st Mountains classification, Tour of China II
2016
3rd GP Izola
3rd Grand Prix Südkärnten
2017
National Road Championships

1st Under-23 time trial
5th Time trial

7th Time trial, UEC European Under-23 Road Championships
2018
5th Overall Tour de Taiwan
2019
2nd Overall Tour of Bihor
