= 2018 Adriatica Ionica Race =

2018 UCI Europe Tour

Race details
- Dates: 20–24 June 2018
- Stages: 5
- Distance: 676.5 km (420.4 mi)
- Winning time: 16h 39' 22"

Results
Jersey awarded to the overall winner	Winner	Iván Sosa (COL)	(Androni Giocattoli–Sidermec)
	Second	Giulio Ciccone (ITA)	(Bardiani–CSF)
	Third	Ildar Arslanov (RUS)	(Gazprom–RusVelo)
Jersey awarded to the points classification winner	Points	Elia Viviani (ITA)	(Quick-Step Floors)
Jersey awarded to the mountains classification winner	Mountains	Enrico Logica (ITA)	(Biesse–Carrera Gavardo)
Jersey awarded to the youth classification winner	Youth	Iván Sosa (COL)	(Androni Giocattoli–Sidermec)
	Team	UAE Team Emirates	

The 2018 Adriatica Ionica Race/Following the Serenissima Routes was a five-stage men's professional road cycling race.

It was the first edition of the Adriatica Ionica Race/Following the Serenissima Routes. The race started with a team time trial on 20 June in Musile di Piave and finished on 24 June in Trieste. The race is part of the UCI Europe Tour, and is categorised by the UCI as a 2.1 race. The race was won by the Colombian rider Iván Sosa (Androni Giocattoli–Sidermec).

== Teams ==
The 16 teams invited to the race were:

UCI World Tour teams

- Quick-Step Floors
- Bahrain–Merida
- UAE Team Emirates
- Trek–Segafredo
- Team Dimension Data

UCI Professional Continental teams

- Bardiani–CSF
- Androni Giocattoli–Sidermec
- Nippo–Vini Fantini–Europa Ovini
- Wilier Triestina–Selle Italia
- Gazprom–RusVelo
- Israel Cycling Academy
- Roompot–Nederlandse Loterij

UCI Continental teams

- Trevigiani Phonix–Hemus 1896
- Biesse–Carrera Gavardo
- Sangemini–MG.K Vis Vega

National teams

- Italy

== Route ==
Stage characteristics and winners
Stage	Date	Course	Distance	Type	Winner
1	20 June	Musile di Piave to Lido di Jesolo	23.3 km (14 mi)	Team time trial	Quick-Step Floors (BEL)
2	21 June	Lido di Jesolo to Maser	152.5 km (95 mi)	Flat stage	Elia Viviani (ITA)
3	22 June	Mussolente to Passo Giau	154.7 km (96 mi)	Mountain stage	Iván Sosa (COL)
4	23 June	San Vito di Cadore to Grado	229.2 km (142 mi)	Flat stage	Elia Viviani (ITA)
5	24 June	Grado to Trieste	116.8 km (73 mi)	Hilly stage	Elia Viviani (ITA)
	Total		676.5 km (420 mi)		

== Stages ==
=== Stage 1 ===
20 June 2018 — Musile di Piave to Lido di Jesolo, 23.3 km (14 mi), team time trial (TTT)

Result of Stage 1
Rank	Team	Time
1	Quick-Step Floors	25' 29"
2	UAE Team Emirates	+ 14"
3	Trek–Segafredo	+ 18"
4	Team Dimension Data	+ 34"
5	Gazprom–RusVelo	+ 38"
6	Bahrain–Merida	+ 1' 08"
7	Italy (national team)	+ 1' 17"
8	Sangemini–MG.K Vis Vega	+ 1' 18"
9	Androni Giocattoli–Sidermec	+ 1' 18"
10	Bardiani–CSF	+ 1' 22"

General classification after Stage 1
Rank	Rider	Team	Time
1	Elia Viviani (ITA)	Quick-Step Floors	25' 29"
2	James Knox (GBR)	Quick-Step Floors	+ 0"
3	Davide Martinelli (ITA)	Quick-Step Floors	+ 0"
4	Jhonatan Narváez (ECU)	Quick-Step Floors	+ 0"
5	Niki Terpstra (NED)	Quick-Step Floors	+ 0"
6	Valerio Conti (ITA)	UAE Team Emirates	+ 14"
7	Simone Petilli (ITA)	UAE Team Emirates	+ 14"
8	Simone Consonni (ITA)	UAE Team Emirates	+ 14"
9	Manuele Mori (ITA)	UAE Team Emirates	+ 14"
10	Edward Ravasi (ITA)	UAE Team Emirates	+ 14"

=== Stage 2 ===
21 June 2018 — Lido di Jesolo to Maser, 152.5 km (95 mi)

Result of Stage 2
Rank	Rider	Team	Time
1	Elia Viviani (ITA)	Quick-Step Floors	3h 49' 09"
2	Simone Consonni (ITA)	UAE Team Emirates	+ 0"
3	Mihkel Räim (EST)	Israel Cycling Academy	+ 0"
4	Manuel Belletti (ITA)	Androni Giocattoli–Sidermec	+ 0"
5	Enrico Barbin (ITA)	Bardiani–CSF	+ 0"
6	Giacomo Nizzolo (ITA)	Trek–Segafredo	+ 0"
7	Simone Velasco (ITA)	Wilier Triestina–Selle Italia	+ 0"
8	Sergey Shilov (RUS)	Gazprom–RusVelo	+ 0"
9	Kristian Sbaragli (ITA)	Israel Cycling Academy	+ 0"
10	Paolo Totò (ITA)	Sangemini–MG.K Vis Vega	+ 0"

General classification after Stage 2
Rank	Rider	Team	Time
1	Elia Viviani (ITA)	Quick-Step Floors	4h 14' 28"
2	Niki Terpstra (NED)	Quick-Step Floors	+ 10"
3	Simone Consonni (ITA)	UAE Team Emirates	+ 18"
4	Edward Ravasi (ITA)	UAE Team Emirates	+ 24"
5	Simone Petilli (ITA)	UAE Team Emirates	+ 24"
6	Valerio Conti (ITA)	UAE Team Emirates	+ 24"
7	Giacomo Nizzolo (ITA)	Trek–Segafredo	+ 26"
8	Fabio Felline (ITA)	Trek–Segafredo	+ 26"
9	Nicola Conci (ITA)	Trek–Segafredo	+ 26"
10	Peter Stetina (USA)	Trek–Segafredo	+ 29"

=== Stage 3 ===
22 June 2018 — Mussolente to Passo Giau, 154.7 km (96 mi)

Result of Stage 3
Rank	Rider	Team	Time
1	Iván Sosa (COL)	Androni Giocattoli–Sidermec	4h 40' 42"
2	Giulio Ciccone (ITA)	Bardiani–CSF	+ 37"
3	Ben Hermans (BEL)	Israel Cycling Academy	+ 1' 06"
4	Edward Ravasi (ITA)	UAE Team Emirates	+ 1' 12"
5	Pieter Weening (NED)	Roompot–Nederlandse Loterij	+ 1' 29"
6	Ildar Arslanov (RUS)	Gazprom–RusVelo	+ 1' 43"
7	Gianluca Brambilla (ITA)	Trek–Segafredo	+ 2' 20"
8	Peter Stetina (USA)	Trek–Segafredo	+ 2' 27"
9	Giovanni Carboni (ITA)	Bardiani–CSF	+ 2' 39"
10	Simone Petilli (ITA)	UAE Team Emirates	+ 2' 45"

General classification after Stage 3
Rank	Rider	Team	Time
1	Iván Sosa (COL)	Androni Giocattoli–Sidermec	8h 56' 28"
2	Edward Ravasi (ITA)	UAE Team Emirates	+ 18"
3	Giulio Ciccone (ITA)	Bardiani–CSF	+ 45"
4	Ildar Arslanov (RUS)	Gazprom–RusVelo	+ 1' 13"
5	Peter Stetina (USA)	Trek–Segafredo	+ 1' 38"
6	Ben Hermans (BEL)	Israel Cycling Academy	+ 1' 45"
7	Simone Petilli (ITA)	UAE Team Emirates	+ 1' 51"
8	Gianluca Brambilla (ITA)	Trek–Segafredo	+ 1' 54"
9	Pieter Weening (NED)	Roompot–Nederlandse Loterij	+ 2' 03"
10	Valerio Conti (ITA)	UAE Team Emirates	+ 2' 03"

=== Stage 4 ===
23 June 2018 — San Vito di Cadore to Grado, 223.2 km (139 mi)

Result of Stage 4
Rank	Rider	Team	Time
1	Elia Viviani (ITA)	Quick-Step Floors	5h 14' 56"
2	Giacomo Nizzolo (ITA)	Trek–Segafredo	+ 0"
3	Álvaro José Hodeg (COL)	Quick-Step Floors	+ 0"
4	Riccardo Minali (ITA)	Italy (national team)	+ 0"
5	Mark Renshaw (AUS)	Team Dimension Data	+ 0"
6	Reinardt Janse van Rensburg (RSA)	Team Dimension Data	+ 0"
7	Simone Consonni (ITA)	UAE Team Emirates	+ 0"
8	Marco Canola (ITA)	Nippo–Vini Fantini–Europa Ovini	+ 0"
9	Mihkel Räim (EST)	Israel Cycling Academy	+ 0"
10	Jalel Duranti (ITA)	Italy (national team)	+ 0"

General classification after Stage 4
Rank	Rider	Team	Time
1	Iván Sosa (COL)	Androni Giocattoli–Sidermec	14h 11' 30"
2	Giulio Ciccone (ITA)	Bardiani–CSF	+ 45"
3	Ildar Arslanov (RUS)	Gazprom–RusVelo	+ 1' 13"
4	Edward Ravasi (ITA)	UAE Team Emirates	+ 1' 44"
5	Valerio Conti (ITA)	UAE Team Emirates	+ 1' 57"
6	Pieter Weening (NED)	Roompot–Nederlandse Loterij	+ 2' 03"
7	Giovanni Carboni (ITA)	Bardiani–CSF	+ 2' 53"
8	Peter Stetina (USA)	Trek–Segafredo	+ 3' 04"
9	Simone Petilli (ITA)	UAE Team Emirates	+ 3' 17"
10	Gianluca Brambilla (ITA)	Trek–Segafredo	+ 3' 20"

=== Stage 5 ===
24 June 2018 — Grado to Trieste, 116.8 km (73 mi)

Result of Stage 4
Rank	Rider	Team	Time
1	Elia Viviani (ITA)	Quick-Step Floors	2h 27' 48"
2	Mark Cavendish (GBR)	Team Dimension Data	+ 0"
3	Riccardo Minali (ITA)	Italy (national team)	+ 0"
4	Álvaro José Hodeg (COL)	Quick-Step Floors	+ 0"
5	Luca Pacioni (ITA)	Wilier Triestina–Selle Italia	+ 0"
6	Simone Consonni (ITA)	UAE Team Emirates	+ 0"
7	Manuel Belletti (ITA)	Androni Giocattoli–Sidermec	+ 0"
8	Giacomo Nizzolo (ITA)	Trek–Segafredo	+ 0"
9	Marco Canola (ITA)	Nippo–Vini Fantini–Europa Ovini	+ 0"
10	Matteo Trentin (ITA)	Italy (national team)	+ 0"

General classification after Stage 4
Rank	Rider	Team	Time
1	Iván Sosa (COL)	Androni Giocattoli–Sidermec	16h 39' 22"
2	Giulio Ciccone (ITA)	Bardiani–CSF	+ 41"
3	Ildar Arslanov (RUS)	Gazprom–RusVelo	+ 1' 18"
4	Edward Ravasi (ITA)	UAE Team Emirates	+ 1' 40"
5	Valerio Conti (ITA)	UAE Team Emirates	+ 1' 57"
6	Pieter Weening (NED)	Roompot–Nederlandse Loterij	+ 2' 08"
7	Giovanni Carboni (ITA)	Bardiani–CSF	+ 2' 53"
8	Peter Stetina (USA)	Trek–Segafredo	+ 3' 09"
9	Simone Petilli (ITA)	UAE Team Emirates	+ 3' 17"
10	Gianluca Brambilla (ITA)	Trek–Segafredo	+ 3' 20"

== Classification leadership ==
In the 2018 Adriatica Ionica, five jerseys were awarded. The general classification was calculated by adding each cyclist's finishing times on each stage. Time bonuses were awarded to the first three finishers on all stages apart from the time trial stage. The first three riders would get 10, 6, and 4 seconds, respectively. The leader of the general classification received a blue jersey sponsored by Geo&tex2000. This classification was considered the most important of the 2018 Adriatica Ionica, and the winner of the classification was considered the winner of the race.

Points classification points for the top 10 positions by type
Type	1	2	3	4	5	6	7	8	9	10
Flat stage	25	18	12	8	6	5	4	3	2	1
High mountain stage	15	12	9	7	6	5	4	3	2	1
Intermediate sprint	10	6	3	2	1	0				
Team time trial	0									

The second classification was the points classification. Riders were awarded points for finishing in the top ten in a stage. Points were also won in intermediate sprints; ten points for crossing the sprint line first, six points for second place, three for third, two for fourth, and a single point for fifth. The leader of the points classification was awarded a red jersey sponsored by Full Speed Ahead.

Points for the mountains classification
Position	1	2	3	4	5
Points for H.C category	10	8	6	4	2
Points for Category 1	8	6	4	2	1
Points for Category 2	5	3	2	0	
Points for Category 3	3	2	1	0	

The third classification was the mountains classification. Points were awarded to the riders that reached the summit of the most difficult climbs first. The climbs were categorized, in order of increasing difficulty, as third-, second-, and first-category and hors catégorie (read: "beyond category"). The leadership of the mountains classification was marked by a green sponsored by Prologo.

The fourth jersey represented the young rider classification, marked by a white jersey sponsored by Gabetti. Only riders born after 1 January 1993 were eligible; the young rider best placed in the general classification was the leader of the young rider classification.

The final classification was the "Fighting Spirit Prize" given after each stage to the rider considered, by a jury, to have "who struggled in order to achieve results in all the competitive moments of the race or the one who take action to start or carry out the longest breakaway". The winner wore an orange jersey sponsored by Suzuki. There was also a classification for teams, in which the times of the best three cyclists in a team on each stage were added together; the leading team at the end of the race was the team with the lowest cumulative time.

Classification leadership by stage
Stage	Winner	General classification	Points classification	Mountains classification	Young rider classification	Combativity classification	Team classification
1	Quick-Step Floors	Elia Viviani	not awarded	not awarded	James Knox	not awarded	not awarded
2	Elia Viviani	Elia Viviani	Elia Viviani	Enrico Logica	Nicola Conci	Javier Montoya	UAE Team Emirates
3	Iván Sosa	Iván Sosa	Elia Viviani	Iván Sosa	Iván Sosa	Floris Gerts	UAE Team Emirates
4	Elia Viviani	Iván Sosa	Elia Viviani	Enrico Logica	Iván Sosa	Andrea Toniatti	UAE Team Emirates
5	Elia Viviani	Iván Sosa	Elia Viviani	Enrico Logica	Iván Sosa	Michele Gazzara	UAE Team Emirates
Final		Iván Sosa	Elia Viviani	Enrico Logica	Iván Sosa	No award	UAE Team Emirates

- In stage three, Simone Consonni, who was second in the points classification, wore the red jersey, because first placed Elia Viviani wore the blue jersey as leader of the general classification.
- In stage four, Floris Gerts, who was second in the mountains classification, wore the green jersey, because first placed Iván Sosa wore the blue jersey as leader of the general classification.
- In stage four, Giovanni Carboni, who was second in the best young rider classification, wore the white jersey, because first placed Iván Sosa wore the blue jersey as leader of the general classification.
- In stage five, Giovanni Carboni, who was second in the best young rider classification, wore the white jersey, because first placed Iván Sosa wore the blue jersey as leader of the general classification.

== Final standings ==
Legend
General classification	Denotes the winner of the general classification	Points classification	Denotes the leader of the points classification
Mountains classification	Denotes the leader of the mountains classification	Young rider classification	Denotes the winner of the young rider classification

=== General classification ===
Final general classification (1–10)
Rank	Rider	Team	Time
1	Iván Sosa (COL)	Androni Giocattoli–Sidermec	16h 39' 22"
2	Giulio Ciccone (ITA)	Bardiani–CSF	+ 41"
3	Ildar Arslanov (RUS)	Gazprom–RusVelo	+ 1' 18"
4	Edward Ravasi (ITA)	UAE Team Emirates	+ 1' 40"
5	Valerio Conti (ITA)	UAE Team Emirates	+ 1' 57"
6	Pieter Weening (NED)	Roompot–Nederlandse Loterij	+ 2' 08"
7	Giovanni Carboni (ITA)	Bardiani–CSF	+ 2' 53"
8	Peter Stetina (USA)	Trek–Segafredo	+ 3' 09"
9	Simone Petilli (ITA)	UAE Team Emirates	+ 3' 17"
10	Gianluca Brambilla (ITA)	Trek–Segafredo	+ 3' 20"

=== Points classification ===
Final points classification (1–10)
Rank	Rider	Team	Points
1	Elia Viviani (ITA)	Quick-Step Floors	75
2	Simone Consonni (ITA)	UAE Team Emirates	27
3	Giacomo Nizzolo (ITA)	Trek–Segafredo	26
4	Riccardo Minali (ITA)	Italy (national team)	20
5	Álvaro José Hodeg (COL)	Quick-Step Floors	20
6	Mark Cavendish (GBR)	Team Dimension Data	18
7	Iván Sosa (COL)	Androni Giocattoli–Sidermec	15
8	Mihkel Räim (EST)	Israel Cycling Academy	14
9	Giulio Ciccone (ITA)	Bardiani–CSF	12
10	Manuel Belletti (ITA)	Androni Giocattoli–Sidermec	12

=== Mountains classification ===
Final mountains classification (1–10)
Rank	Rider	Team	Points
1	Enrico Logica (ITA)	Biesse–Carrera Gavardo	14
2	Iván Sosa (COL)	Androni Giocattoli–Sidermec	10
3	Floris Gerts (NED)	Roompot–Nederlandse Loterij	10
4	Fabio Felline (ITA)	Trek–Segafredo	8
5	Yukiya Arashiro (JPN)	Bahrain–Merida	8
6	Giulio Ciccone (ITA)	Bardiani–CSF	8
7	Michele Gazzara (ITA)	Sangemini–MG.K Vis Vega	6
8	Marco Frapporti (ITA)	Androni Giocattoli–Sidermec	6
9	Matteo Draperi (ITA)	Sangemini–MG.K Vis Vega	5
10	Edward Ravasi (ITA)	UAE Team Emirates	4

=== Young rider classification ===
Final young rider classification (1–10)
Rank	Rider	Team	Time
1	Iván Sosa (COL)	Androni Giocattoli–Sidermec	16h 39' 22"
2	Giovanni Carboni (ITA)	Bardiani–CSF	+ 2' 53"
3	Artem Nych (RUS)	Gazprom–RusVelo	+ 4' 21"
4	Nicola Conci (ITA)	Trek–Segafredo	+ 6' 29"
5	Abderrahim Zahiri (MAR)	Trevigiani Phonix–Hemus 1896	+ 8' 54"
6	Nicola Bagioli (ITA)	Nippo–Vini Fantini–Europa Ovini	+ 8' 57"
7	Simone Ravanelli (ITA)	Biesse–Carrera Gavardo	+ 9' 49"
8	Filippo Zaccanti (ITA)	Nippo–Vini Fantini–Europa Ovini	+ 10' 14"
9	Simone Velasco (ITA)	Wilier Triestina–Selle Italia	+ 13' 57"
10	James Knox (GBR)	Quick-Step Floors	+ 15' 45"

=== Team classification ===
Final team classification (1–10)
Rank	Team	Time
1	UAE Team Emirates	50h 01' 52"
2	Trek–Segafredo	+ 4' 24"
3	Bardiani–CSF	+ 6' 30"
4	Gazprom–RusVelo	+ 9' 33"
5	Roompot–Nederlandse Loterij	+ 13' 46"
6	Nippo–Vini Fantini–Europa Ovini	+ 15' 54"
7	Androni Giocattoli–Sidermec	+ 16' 47"
8	Israel Cycling Academy	+ 19' 38"
9	Biesse–Carrera Gavardo	+ 23' 07"
10	Wilier Triestina–Selle Italia	+ 26' 14"
