= 2016 UCI Road World Championships – Men's junior time trial =

Men's junior time trial
2016 UCI Road World Championships
- Time trial Rainbow jersey

Race details
- Dates: 11 October 2016
- Stages: 1
- Distance: 28.9 km (17.96 mi)
- Winning time: 34' 42.29"

Medalists
	Gold	Brandon McNulty (United States)
	Silver	Mikkel Bjerg (Denmark)
	Bronze	Ian Garrison (United States)

The Men's junior time trial of the 2016 UCI Road World Championships took place in and around in Doha, Qatar on 11 October 2016. The course of the race was 28.9 km (18.0 mi).

After winning the bronze medal in 2015, Brandon McNulty won the gold medal for the United States, finishing 35.18 seconds clear of his next closest competitor, Mikkel Bjerg from Denmark. The bronze medal was won by McNulty's compatriot Ian Garrison, 17.90 seconds behind Bjerg and 53.08 seconds in arrears of McNulty.

== Qualification ==
=== Qualification for the event ===
All National Federations were allowed to enter four riders for the race, with a maximum of two riders to start. In addition to this number, the outgoing World Champion and the current continental champions were also able to take part.

== Schedule ==
All times are in Arabia Standard Time (UTC+3).

Date	Time	Event
11 October 2016	09:00–12:30	Men's junior time trial

== Final classification ==
Rank	Rider	Time
1	(United States) Brandon McNulty (USA)	34' 42.29"
2	(Denmark) Mikkel Bjerg (DNK)	+ 35.18"
3	(United States) Ian Garrison (USA)	+ 53.08"
4	(Denmark) Julius Johansen (DNK)	+ 1' 02.55"
5	(Belgium) Ruben Apers (BEL)	+ 1' 24.05"
6	(Norway) Iver Knotten (NOR)	+ 1' 32.99"
7	(Eritrea) Awet Habtom (ERI)	+ 1' 40.02"
8	(Switzerland) Marc Hirschi (SUI)	+ 1' 43.70"
9	(Slovenia) Jaka Primožič (SLO)	+ 1' 53.95"
10	(Netherlands) Jarno Mobach (NED)	+ 2' 00.53"
11	(New Zealand) Robert Stannard (NZL)	+ 2' 02.42"
12	(Australia) Alastair Christie-Johnston (AUS)	+ 2' 08.12"
13	(Mexico) Luis Villalobos (MEX)	+ 2' 08.53"
14	(Australia) Maccie Carter (AUS)	+ 2' 16.00"
15	(Spain) Iñigo Elosegui (ESP)	+ 2' 19.23"
16	(Netherlands) Nils Eekhoff (NED)	+ 2' 36.63"
17	(Luxembourg) Michel Ries (LUX)	+ 2' 39.81"
18	(Belgium) Jasper Philipsen (BEL)	+ 2' 41.26"
19	(Slovenia) Nik Čemažar (SLO)	+ 2' 42.08"
20	(Australia) Harry Sweeny (AUS)	+ 2' 42.49"
21	(South Africa) Jason Oosthuizen (RSA)	+ 2' 45.97"
22	(Kazakhstan) Igor Chzhan (KAZ)	+ 2' 46.70"
23	(Norway) Andreas Leknessund (NOR)	+ 2' 49.01"
24	(Canada) Nickolas Zukowsky (CAN)	+ 2' 51.71"
25	(Germany) Bastian Flicke (DEU)	+ 2' 51.92"
26	(Portugal) João Almeida (POR)	+ 2' 57.93"
27	(Italy) Alexander Konychev (ITA)	+ 2' 58.36"
28	(Mongolia) Tegshbayar Batsaikhan (MGL)	+ 2' 59.39"
29	(Serbia) Veljko Stojnić (SRB)	+ 3' 00.80"
30	(Kazakhstan) Ilya Gorbushin (KAZ)	+ 3' 11.87"
31	(Germany) Richard Banusch (DEU)	+ 3' 12.15"
32	(Italy) Alessandro Covi (ITA)	+ 3' 13.93"
33	(Hungary) Barnabás Peák (HUN)	+ 3' 14.69"
34	(France) Alexys Brunel (FRA)	+ 3' 14.92"
35	(Switzerland) Stefan Bissegger (SUI)	+ 3' 17.68"
36	(Czech Republic) Richard Holec (CZE)	+ 3' 18.25"
37	(France) Florentin Lecamus (FRA)	+ 3' 20.14"
38	(Austria) Markus Wildauer (AUT)	+ 3' 27.86"
39	(Poland) Filip Maciejuk (POL)	+ 3' 30.85"
40	(Colombia) Adrián Bustamante (COL)	+ 3' 34.29"
41	(France) Clément Davy (FRA)	+ 3' 39.49"
42	(Republic of Ireland) Ronan Tuomey (IRL)	+ 3' 39.89"
43	(Republic of Ireland) Xeno Young (IRL)	+ 3' 40.72"
44	(New Zealand) James Fouché (NZL)	+ 3' 49.46"
45	(Portugal) Daniel Viegas (POR)	+ 3' 54.48"
46	(Russia) Nikita Shcherbun (RUS)	+ 4' 06.62"
47	(Ukraine) Daniil Nikulin (UKR)	+ 4' 08.29"
48	(Turkey) Halil Ibrahim Dilek (TUR)	+ 4' 08.81"
49	(Ukraine) Vladyslav Shcherban (UKR)	+ 4' 11.71"
50	(South Africa) Damean Oosthuizen (RSA)	+ 4' 15.52"
51	(Russia) Stanislav Koniaev (RUS)	+ 4' 16.59"
52	(Algeria) Hamza Mansouri (ALG)	+ 4' 19.66"
53	(Czech Republic) Jakub Otruba (CZE)	+ 4' 19.97"
54	(Austria) Marco Friedrich (AUT)	+ 4' 21.57"
55	(Turkey) Onur Turgut (TUR)	+ 4' 32.61"
56	(Luxembourg) Raphaël Kockelmann (LUX)	+ 4' 34.20"
57	(Kazakhstan) Vadim Pronskiy (KAZ)	+ 4' 38.69"
58	(Eritrea) Simon Musie (ERI)	+ 4' 40.08"
59	(Latvia) Kristers Ansons (LAT)	+ 4' 43.45"
60	(Algeria) Abdelraouf Bengayou (ALG)	+ 4' 50.05"
61	(Serbia) Ognjen Ilić (SRB)	+ 4' 55.72"
62	(Japan) Ayumu Watanabe (JPN)	+ 5' 20.13"
63	(Iran) Ebrahim Hajizadehasl (IRI)	+ 5' 22.75"
64	(Canada) Matthew Staples (CAN)	+ 5' 28.16"
65	(Trinidad and Tobago) Tyler Cole (TTO)	+ 5' 35.53"
66	(Bahrain) Saad Alsaadi (BHR)	+ 5' 44.78"
67	(Rwanda) Jean Paul René Ukiniwabo (RWA)	+ 5' 48.23"
68	(Azerbaijan) Mikayil Safarli (AZE)	+ 5' 55.79"
69	(China) Sha Sheng (CHN)	+ 5' 58.56"
70	(Vietnam) Phan Hoàng Thái (VIE)	+ 6' 03.79"
71	(Macau) Long San Lao (MAC)	+ 6' 28.45"
72	(Japan) Keitaro Sawada (JPN)	+ 6' 44.33"
73	(Saudi Arabia) Abdulaziz Alkhuwaytim (KSA)	+ 6' 59.05"
74	(Thailand) Thanakhan Chaiyasombat (THA)	+ 7' 07.14"
75	(Azerbaijan) Karim Shiraliyev (AZE)	+ 7' 17.13"
76	(Algeria) Abderahim Amari (ALG)	+ 7' 31.72"
77	(Macau) Chi Son Ieong (MAC)	+ 7' 41.46"
78	(China) Benneng Yu (CHN)	+ 8' 02.57"
79	(Georgia (country)) Tamaz Tsereteli (GEO)	+ 9' 21.14"
80	(Aruba) Jair Kelly (ARU)	+ 9' 24.36"
81	(Saudi Arabia) Abdullah Alrashdi (KSA)	+ 9' 48.12"
82	(Oman) Noofal Al Habsi (OMA)	+ 10' 03.02"
83	(Argentina) Tomás Contte (ARG)	+ 10' 13.02"
DNS	(Qatar) Farhan Al Farizi (QAT)	—
DNS	(Qatar) Gassem Hassan (QAT)	—
