= Jaka Primožič =

Slovenian cyclist (born 1998)

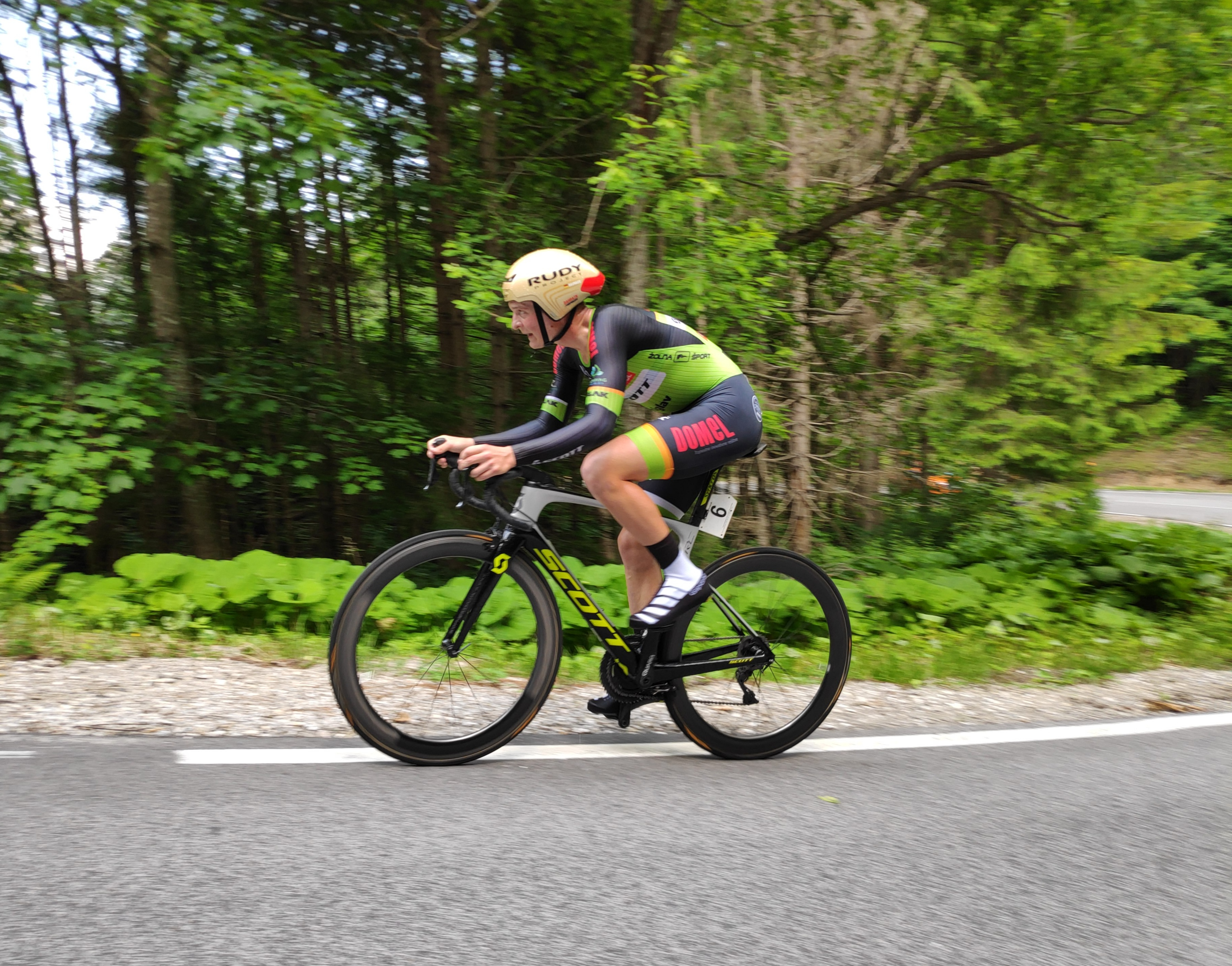
- Primožič in 2020

Personal information
- Born: 8 December 1998 (age 27) Škofja Loka, Slovenia
- Height: 1.79 m (5 ft 10 in)
- Weight: 60 kg (132 lb)

Cycling career
- Sport: Cycling
- Current team: Hrinkow Advarics
- Discipline: Road
- Role: Rider

Amateur team
- 2017–2021: KK Kranj

Professional team
- 2022–: Hrinkow Advarics

Jaka Primožič (born 8 December 1998 in Škofja Loka) is a Slovenian racing cyclist, who currently rides for UCI Continental team Hrinkow Advarics.

== Major results ==
2015
1st Overall Olympic Hopes - Belgrade Trophy Milan Panić

1st Stage 1

2nd Time trial, National Junior Road Championships
2016
1st Overall Olympic Hopes - Belgrade Trophy Milan Panić

1st Stages 1 & 2

1st Overall Oberösterreich Juniorenrundfahrt

1st Stage 3

2nd Montichiari–Roncone
3rd Time trial, National Junior Road Championships
3rd Overall Course de la Paix Juniors
4th Gent–Wevelgem Juniors
5th Overall Giro della Lunigiana
5th Trofeo Citta di Loano
7th Overall GP Général Patton
UCI Junior Road World Championships

8th Road race
9th Time trial

9th Trofeo Guido Dorigo
10th Tour du Pays de Vaud
2017
6th Belgrade–Banja Luka I
2018
4th GP Laguna
10th Time trial, Mediterranean Games
2019
1st Young rider classification, Oberösterreichrundfahrt
5th Overall Carpathian Couriers Race
5th GP Adria Mobil
5th GP Slovenian Istria
5th Gemenc Grand Prix II
5th GP Kranj
8th Gemenc Grand Prix I
2021
8th Overall Istrian Spring Trophy
2022
4th Road race, National Road Championships
7th GP Gorenjska
9th Overall Istrian Spring Trophy
9th Overall Giro della Friuli Venezia Giulia
2023
1st Kirschblütenrennen
1st Mountains classification, Belgrade Banjaluka
3rd GP Vorarlberg
4th Radsaison-Eröffnungsennen Leonding
6th Overall Flèche du Sud
6th GP Kranj
2024
1st GP Vorarlberg
1st Radsaison-Eröffnungsrennen Leonding
National Road Championships

3rd Time trial
4th Road race

6th Kirschblütenrennen
