= Luca Henn =

German cyclist

Personal information
- Full name: Luca Henn
- Born: 18 December 1997 (age 28)
- Height: 1.76 m (5 ft 9 in)
- Weight: 64 kg (141 lb)

Cycling career
- Sport: Cycling
- Current team: Retired
- Discipline: Road
- Role: Rider

Amateur teams
- 2010–2015: Radsport Rhein-Neckar
- 2014–2015: Team Rothaus Baden

Professional team
- 2016–2020: Team Kuota–Lotto

Luca Henn (born 18 December 1997) is a German former racing cyclist, who rode professionally for the Team Lotto–Kern Haus team, between 2016 and 2020. He rode for Team Lotto–Kern Haus in the men's team time trial event at the 2018 UCI Road World Championships.

== Major results ==
2015
8th Overall Keizer der Juniores
2018
1st Young rider classification CCC Tour - Grody Piastowskie
