= Adriatica Ionica Race =

Italian professional men's road bicycle race

- Adriatica Ionica Race

Race details
- Date: June
- Region: Italy
- English name: Adriatica Ionica Race
- Local name(s): Adriatica Ionica Race (in Italian)
- Discipline: Road
- Competition: UCI Europe Tour
- Type: Stage race
- Organiser: ASD Sport Union
- Race director: Moreno Argentin
- Web site: airace.it/en/

History
- First edition: 2018
- Editions: 4 (as of 2022)
- First winner: Iván Sosa (COL)
- Most wins: No repeat winners
- Most recent: Filippo Zana (ITA)

The Adriatica Ionica Race is an Italian annual professional men's road bicycle race introduced in the 2018 season as a part of the UCI Europe Tour, and currently classified as a 2.1 event. The race is organised by former professional cyclist Moreno Argentin and ASD Sport Union.

== History ==
The race was founded by Argentin together with Quanto Basta, with its first edition taking place in 2018.

Although the name of the race suggest the race being run between the coasts of the Adriatic Sea and the Ionian Sea (similarly to how Tirreno–Adriatico is run between the Tyrrhenian and the Adriatic coasts), the first edition was run entirely within two mountainous Italian regions bordering the Adriatic Sea, namely Veneto and Friuli-Venezia Giulia. Race director Mario Argentin has however stated his plans being to within five years expand the race to a ten-day race starting at the Adriatic coast, passing through Austria, Croatia, Montenegro, Bosnia, North Macedonia, Albania and finally finishing in Athens, Greece.

The race returned with its second edition in 2019, which was held between July 24 and July 28.

== Winners ==
Year	Country	Rider	Team
2018	Colombia	Iván Sosa	Androni Giocattoli–Sidermec
2019	Ukraine	Mark Padun	Bahrain–Merida
2020	No race due to the COVID-19 pandemic		
2021	Italy	Lorenzo Fortunato	Eolo–Kometa
2022	Italy	Filippo Zana	Bardiani–CSF–Faizanè
