= Jonas Rapp =

German cyclist (born 1994)

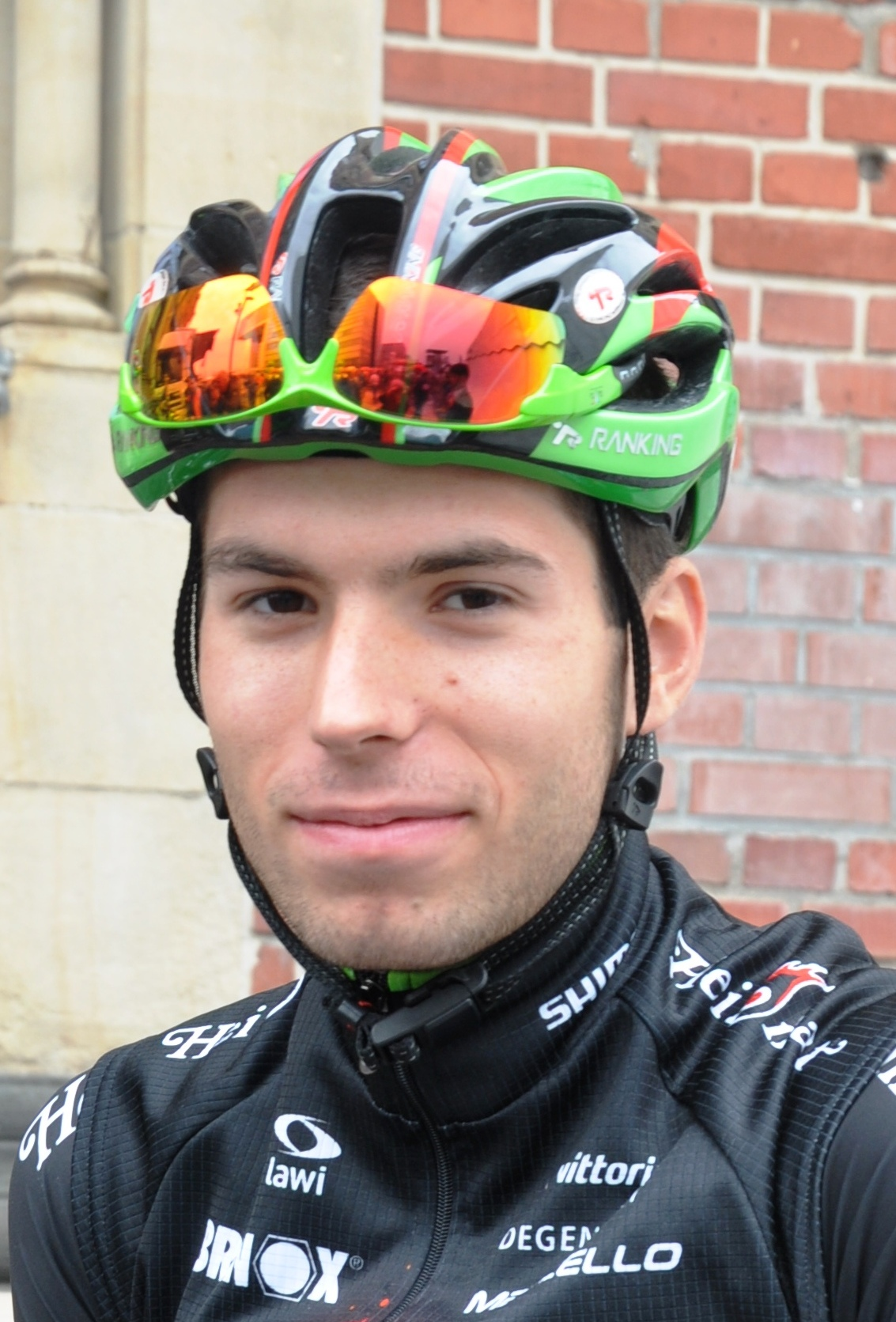
- Rapp in 2016

Personal information
- Full name: Jonas Rapp
- Born: 16 July 1994 (age 32) Rockenhausen, Germany

Cycling career
- Sport: Cycling
- Current team: Hrinkow Advarics
- Discipline: Road
- Role: Rider

Amateur teams
- 2010–2012: RV Mehlingen
- 2013: Radsport Rhein-Neckar
- 2015: RV Mehlingen mein-radladen.de

Professional teams
- 2014: Team Kuota
- 2016–2017: Team Heizomat
- 2018–: Hrinkow Advarics Cycleang

Jonas Rapp (born 16 July 1994) is a German racing cyclist, who currently rides for UCI Continental team Hrinkow Advarics. He rode for Hrinkow Advarics Cycleang in the men's team time trial event at the 2018 UCI Road World Championships.

== Major results ==
2015
7th Road race, National Under–23 Road Championships
2016
8th Overall Oberösterreichrundfahrt
9th Time trial, National Under–23 Road Championships
2017
4th Overall Oberösterreichrundfahrt
4th Duo Normand
2018
4th Overall Oberösterreichrundfahrt
6th Overall Baltyk–Karkonosze Tour
9th GP Kranj
2019
1st Overall Tour of Szeklerland
7th Visegrad 4 Kerekparverseny
2021
1st Overall Giro del Friuli Venezia Giulia

1st Stage 2

8th Overall Sibiu Cycling Tour
9th Overall Tour of Małopolska
10th Overall Belgrade–Banja Luka
2022
2nd GP Vipava Valley & Crossborder Goriška
4th Overall Belgrade Banjaluka
