= Edward Ravasi =

Italian cyclist

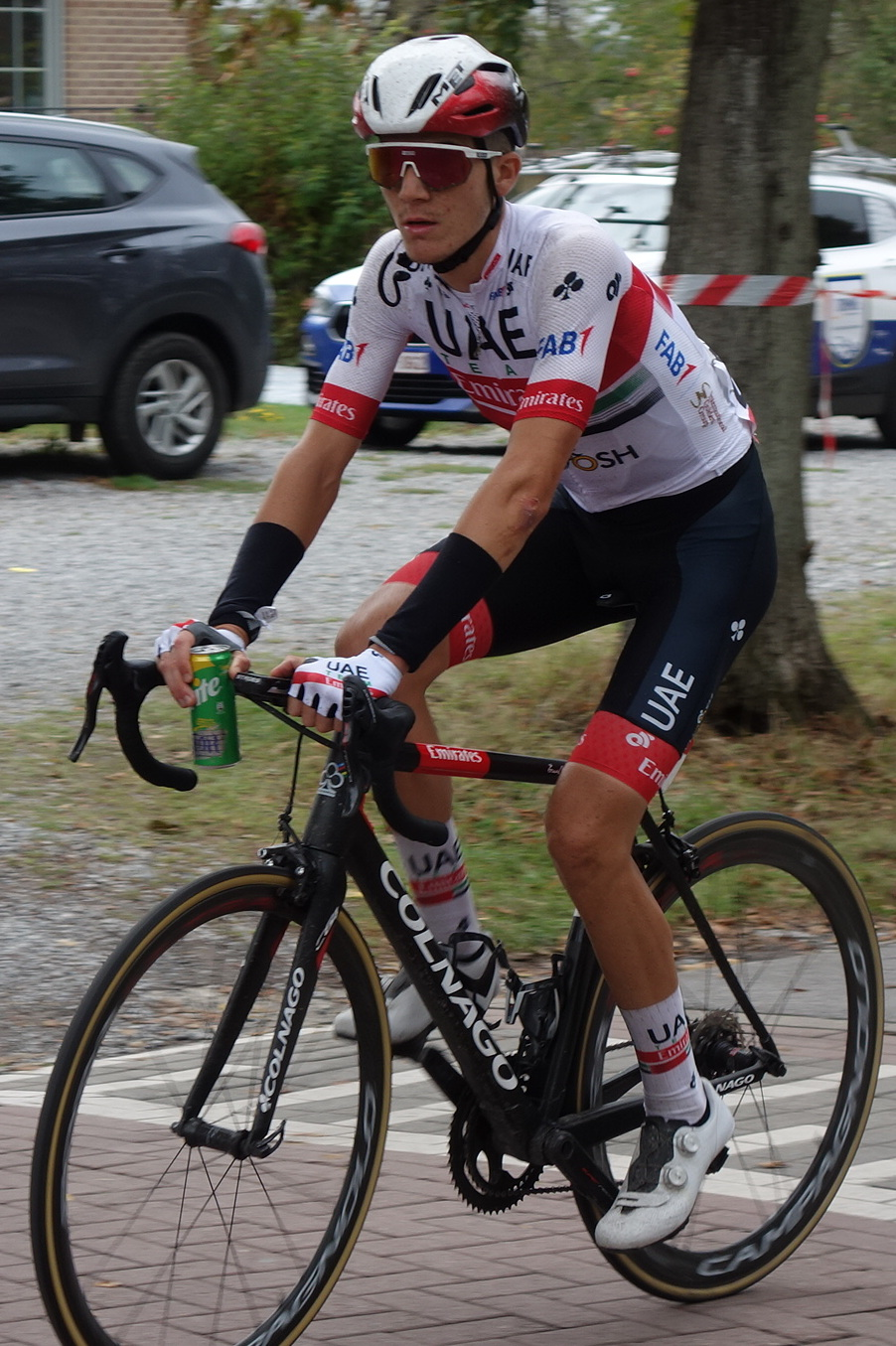

Personal information
- Full name: Edward Ravasi
- Born: 5 June 1994 (age 32) Besnate, Italy
- Height: 1.81 m (5 ft 11 in)
- Weight: 62 kg (137 lb)

Cycling career
- Sport: Cycling
- Current team: Hrinkow Advarics
- Discipline: Road
- Role: Rider
- Rider type: Climber

Amateur team
- 2014–2016: Team Colpack

Professional teams
- 2015: Lampre–Merida (stagiaire)
- 2017–2020: UAE Abu Dhabi
- 2021–2022: Eolo–Kometa
- 2023–: Hrinkow Advarics

Edward Ravasi (born 5 June 1994) is an Italian cyclist, who currently rides for UCI Continental team Hrinkow Advarics. He was named in the start list for the 2017 Giro d'Italia.

== Major results ==
2014
1st Giro del Canavese
1st Stage 3 Giro delle Valli Cuneesi
4th Overall Giro della Valle d'Aosta Mont Blanc
2015
3rd Road race, National Under-23 Road Championships
4th Overall Tour of Croatia

1st Young rider classification

2016
2nd Overall Tour de l'Avenir
2nd GP Capodarco
4th Gran Premio Palio del Recioto
5th Overall Course de la Paix Under-23
5th Overall Giro della Valle d'Aosta Mont Blanc

1st Stage 5

5th Trofeo Banca Popolare di Vicenza
6th Giro del Medio Brenta
6th Gran Premio di Poggiana
6th Piccolo Giro di Lombardia
2017
10th Overall Tour of Slovenia
2018
4th Overall Adriatica Ionica Race

=== Grand Tour general classification results timeline ===
Grand Tour	2017	2018	2019	2020	2021
Giro d'Italia	80	—	—	—	46
Tour de France	—	—	—	—	—
Vuelta a España	—	39	—	—	—

Legend
—	Did not compete
DNF	Did not finish
