= Ian Garrison =

American cyclist

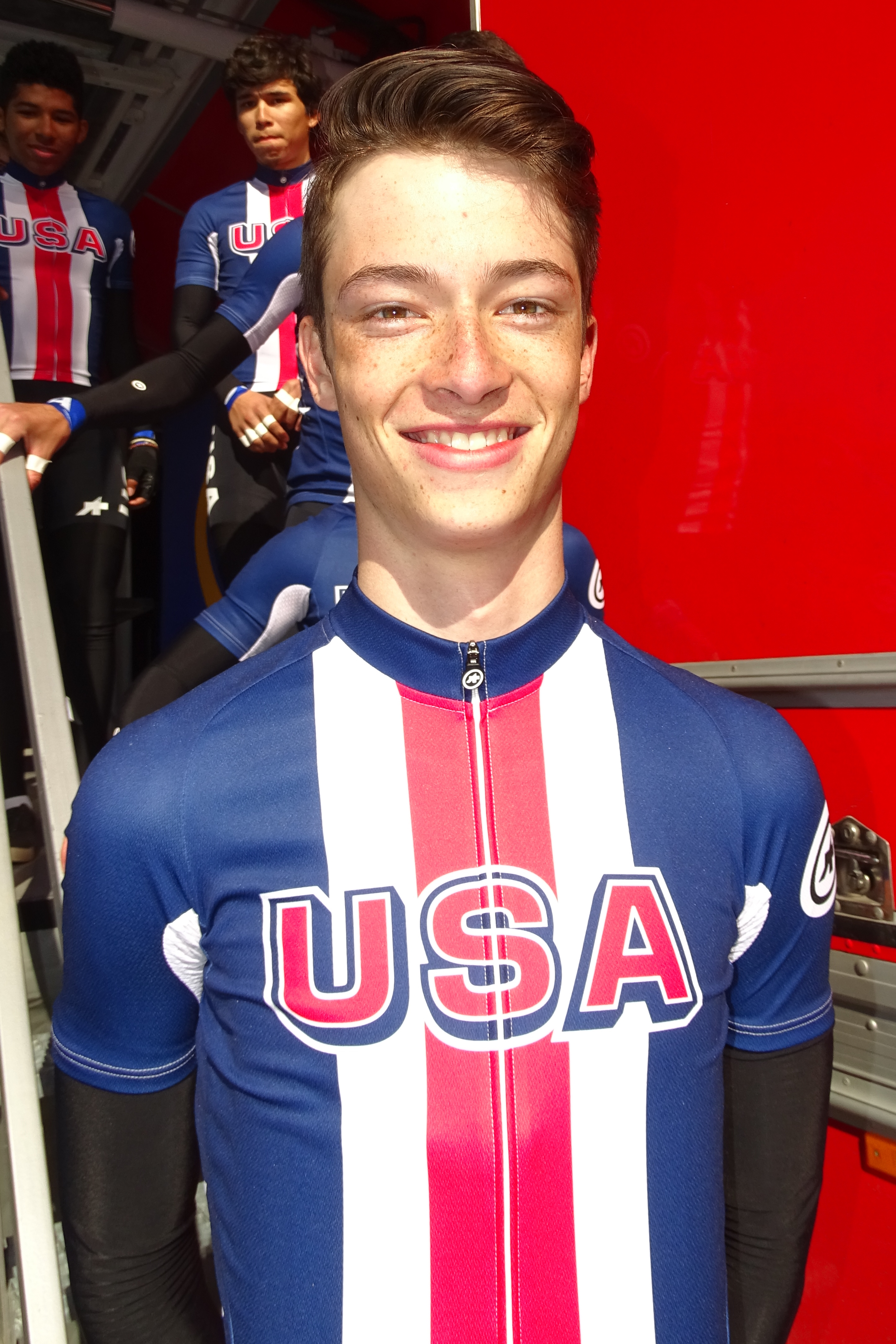
- Garrison in 2016.

Personal information
- Full name: Ian Garrison
- Born: April 14, 1998 (age 28) Decatur, Georgia
- Height: 1.93 m (6 ft 4 in)
- Weight: 76 kg (168 lb; 12 st 0 lb)

Cycling career
- Sport: Cycling
- Current team: Retired
- Discipline: Road
- Role: Rider

Amateur team
- 2015: Hincapie Racing Juniors

Professional teams
- 2017–2019: Axeon–Hagens Berman
- 2020–2021: Deceuninck–Quick-Step.
- 2022: L39ION of Los Angeles

Major wins
- One-day races and Classics National Time Trial Championships (2019)
Medal record
Representing Denmark
Men's road bicycle racing
World Championships
Silver medal – second place	2019 Yorkshire	Under-23 time trial
Bronze medal – third place	2016 Doha	Junior time trial
Pan American Championships
Silver medal – second place	2017 Santo Domingo	Under-23 time trial

Ian Garrison (born April 14, 1998 in Decatur, Georgia) is an American former cyclist, who competed as a professional from 2017 to 2022. In October 2020, he was named in the startlist for the 2020 Vuelta a España, where he finished 127th overall.

== Major results ==
2015
6th Overall Tour de l'Abitibi
2016
2nd Time trial, National Junior Road Championships
3rd Overall Trofeo Karlsberg
3rd Time trial, UCI Junior World Road Championships
8th Tour de l'Abitibi

1st Stage 4

2017
1st Prologue (TTT) Tour Alsace
2nd Time trial, Pan American Under-23 Road Championships
2nd Kattekoers
10th Overall Tour de Beauce

1st Stage 4

2018
1st Prologue Tour Alsace
4th Overall Le Triptyque des Monts et Chateaux
2019
1st Time trial, National Road Championships
1st Time trial, National Under-23 Road Championships
2nd Time trial, UCI Road World Under-23 Championships
2nd Overall Le Triptyque des Monts et Châteaux
10th Hafjell GP

=== Grand Tour general classification results timeline ===
Grand Tour	2020
Giro d'Italia	—
Tour de France	—
Vuelta a España	127

Legend
—	Did not compete
DNF	Did not finish
