= Matthias Mangertseder =

German cyclist

Personal information
- Full name: Matthias Mangertseder
- Born: 24 November 1998 (age 27)

Cycling career
- Sport: Cycling
- Current team: Team Felt–Felbermayr
- Discipline: Road
- Role: Rider

Amateur team
- 2010–2015: Rottaler RSV

Professional teams
- 2016–2019: Team Felbermayr–Simplon Wels
- 2020: Maloja Pushbikers
- 2021–: Team Felbermayr–Simplon Wels

Matthias Mangertseder (born 24 November 1998) is a German racing cyclist, who currently rides for UCI Continental team Team Felt–Felbermayr. He rode for Team Felbermayr–Simplon Wels in the men's team time trial event at the 2018 UCI Road World Championships.
