= Awet Habtom =

Eritrean cyclist

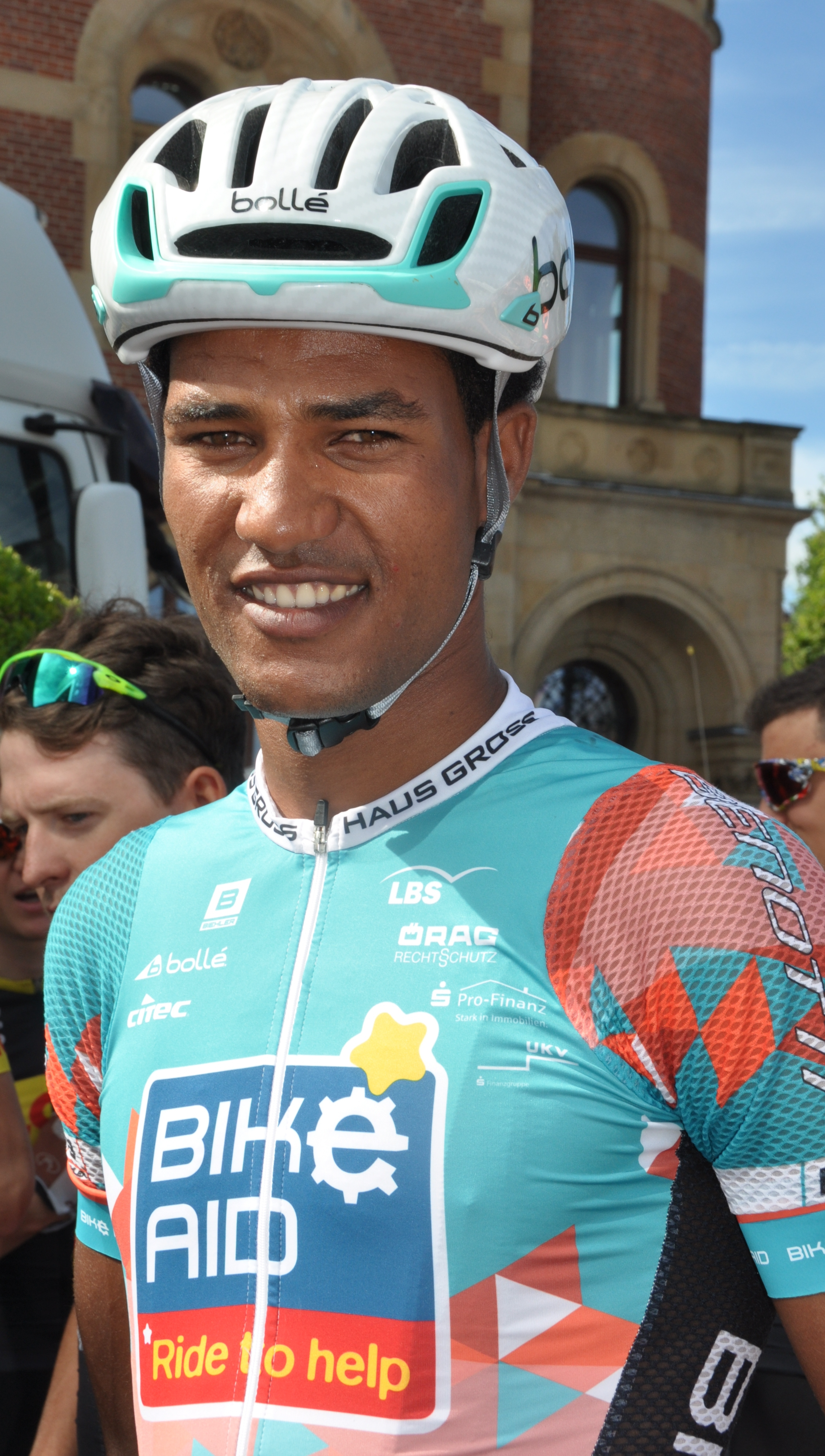
- Habtom in 2017

Personal information
- Full name: Awet Habtom
- Born: 1 January 1998 (age 28)
- Height: 1.83 m (6 ft 0 in)
- Weight: 65 kg (143 lb)

Cycling career
- Sport: Cycling
- Discipline: Road
- Role: Rider

Professional teams
- 2017: Bike Aid
- 2018: Polartec–Kometa

Awet Habtom (born 1 January 1998) is an Eritrean cyclist, who last rode for UCI Continental team Polartec–Kometa.

== Major results ==
2015
1st Road race, National Junior Road Championships
2016
National Junior Road Championships

2nd Road race
2nd Time trial

7th Time trial, UCI Junior Road World Championships
2017
African Road Championships

1st Team time trial
3rd Time trial
8th Road race

8th Overall La Tropicale Amissa Bongo

1st Mountains classification

2018
3rd Overall Tour of Antalya

1st Young rider classification
