= Kevin Rivera =

Costa Rican cyclist

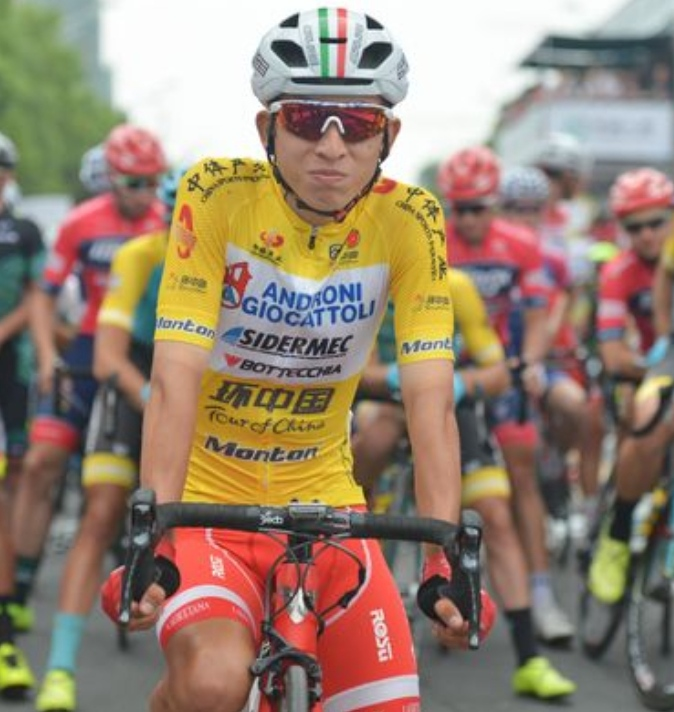

Personal information
- Full name: Kevin Manuel Rivera Serrano
- Born: 28 June 1998 (age 28) Cartago, Costa Rica
- Height: 1.65 m (5 ft 5 in)
- Weight: 56 kg (123 lb)

Cycling career
- Sport: Cycling
- Current team: 7C-Economy Lacoinex
- Discipline: Road
- Role: Rider
- Rider type: Climber

Amateur teams
- 2016: Scott–TeleUno–BCT
- 2022: Scott–Shimano
- 2023–: 7C-Economy Lacoinex

Professional teams
- 2017–2020: Androni Giocattoli–Sidermec
- 2021: Bardiani–CSF–Faizanè
- 2022: Gazprom–RusVelo

Kevin Manuel Rivera Serrano (born 28 June 1998 in Cartago) is a Costa Rican cyclist, currently rides for amateur team 7C-Economy Lacoinex.

== Major results ==
2017
1st Overall Tour of China II

1st Stage 1

2018
1st Stage 7 Vuelta al Táchira
2019
1st Overall Sibiu Cycling Tour

1st Young rider classification
1st Stage 2

3rd Overall Tour of China II

1st Mountains classification
1st Stage 3

9th Milano–Torino
10th Overall Tour of Bihor

1st Young rider classification

2020
1st Stage 4 Tour de Langkawi
3rd Overall Vuelta al Táchira

1st Young rider classification
1st Mountains classification
1st Stages 6 (ITT) & 7

2022
5th Overall Vuelta a Costa Rica

1st Stage 4
