= Daniel Muñoz (cyclist) =

Colombian cyclist

Personal information
- Full name: Daniel Felipe Muñoz Giraldo
- Born: 21 November 1996 (age 29) San Rafael, Antioquia, Colombia
- Height: 1.74 m (5 ft 9 in)
- Weight: 57 kg (126 lb)

Cycling career
- Sport: Cycling
- Current team: Nu Colombia
- Discipline: Road
- Role: Rider
- Rider type: Climber

Amateur teams
- 2015: Team Manzana Postobón
- 2017: EPM
- 2023: EPM–Scott

Professional teams
- 2016: Team Manzana Postobón
- 2018: EPM
- 2019–2022: Androni Giocattoli–Sidermec
- 2024–: Nu Colombia

Daniel Felipe Muñoz Giraldo (born 21 November 1996) is a Colombian cyclist, who currently rides for UCI Continental team Nu Colombia.

== Major results ==
2019
1st Overall Tour of Bihor

1st Mountains classification
1st Stage 2b

2nd Overall Sibiu Cycling Tour

1st Mountains classification

8th Overall Tour de Hongrie
9th Overall Adriatica Ionica Race
2020
9th Overall Tour de Savoie Mont-Blanc
2021
5th Overall Tour of Romania

1st Stage 3

5th Overall Vuelta al Táchira
