= Dominik Hrinkow =

Austrian cyclist

Personal information
- Full name: Dominik Hrinkow
- Born: 4 August 1988 (age 38) Steyr, Austria

Cycling career
- Sport: Cycling
- Current team: Retired
- Discipline: Road
- Role: Rider

Professional teams
- 2007–2009: RC Arbö–Resch & Frisch–Gourmetfein–Wels
- 2010–2014: Vorarlberg–Corratec
- 2014: Tirol Cycling Team
- 2015–2019: Hrinkow Advarics Cycleangteam

Dominik Hrinkow (born 4 August 1988) is an Austrian former racing cyclist, who rode professionally between 2007 and 2019. He rode for Hrinkow Advarics Cycleang in the men's team time trial event at the 2018 UCI Road World Championships.

== Major results ==
2012
9th Overall Oberösterreichrundfahrt
2013
2nd Croatia–Slovenia
2016
6th Croatia–Slovenia
9th Overall Tour du Maroc
2018
4th GP Kranj
7th V4 Special Series Debrecen - Ibrany
10th Overall Baltyk–Karkonosze Tour
2019
1st Stage 2 Tour of Szeklerland
