= Favaro Veneto =

Italian Municipality

Coordinates: 45°30′15″N 12°16′48″E

- Località
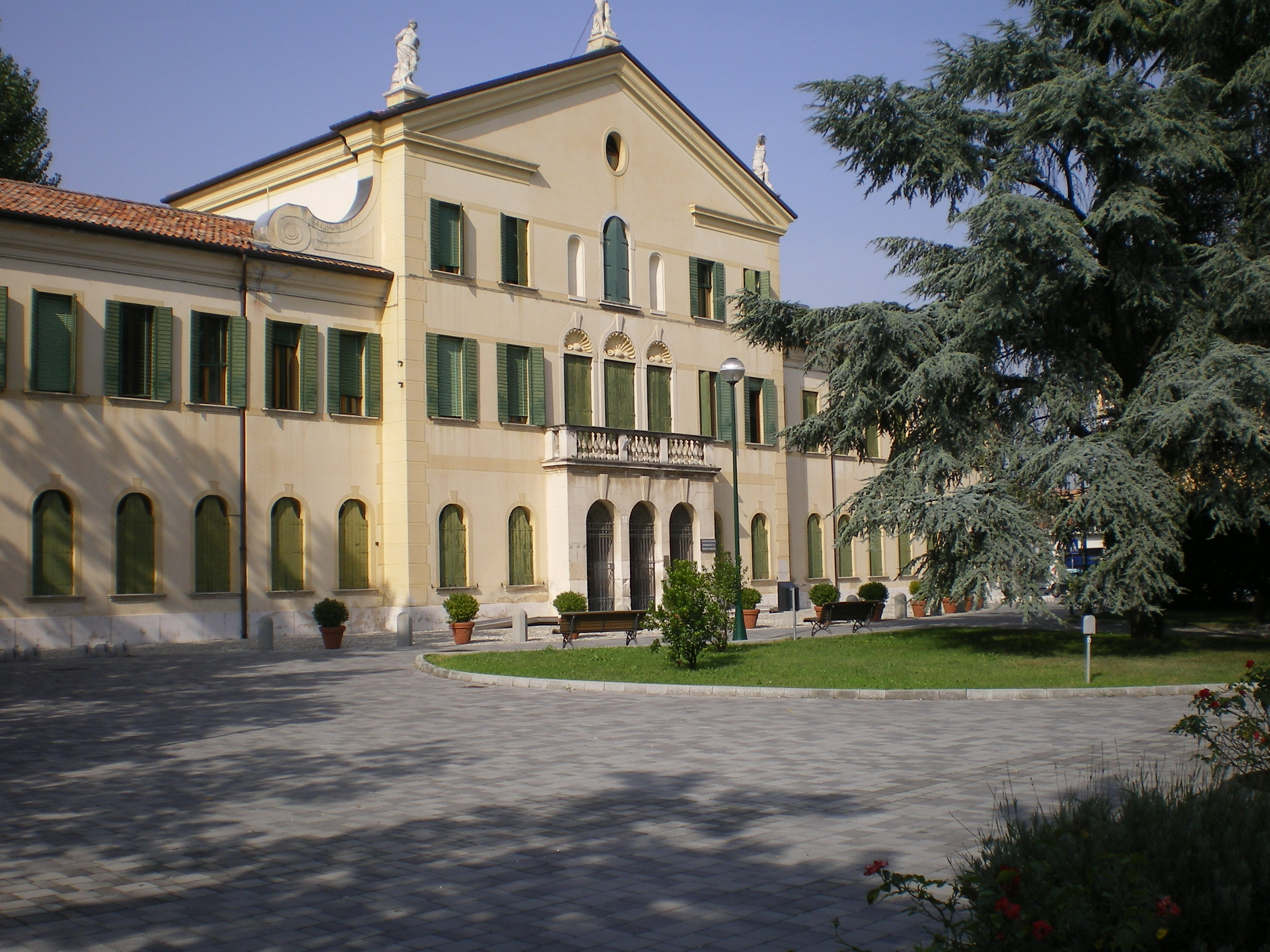
- Favaro Veneto town hall
- Interactive map of Favaro Veneto
- Country: Italy
- Region: Veneto
- Metropolitan city: Venice
- Comune: Venice
- Elevation: 2 m (6.6 ft)

Population (2010)
  - Total: 10,491
- Demonym: favaresi
- Time zone: UTC+1 (CET)
- Postal code: 301743
- Area code: 041

Favaro Veneto is an urban part of the comune (city) of Venice, in the Province of Venice, Veneto, northeastern Italy.

It is the centre for the Favaro Veneto Municipality (Municipalità di Favaro Veneto) which covers the towns of Ca' Noghera, Ca' Solaro, Campalto, Dese and Tessera.

The entire Municipality has 23,753 inhabitants as of 2010.

Media related to Favaro Veneto (Venice) at Wikimedia Commons
