= Patrick Bosman =

Dutch-born Austrian cyclist

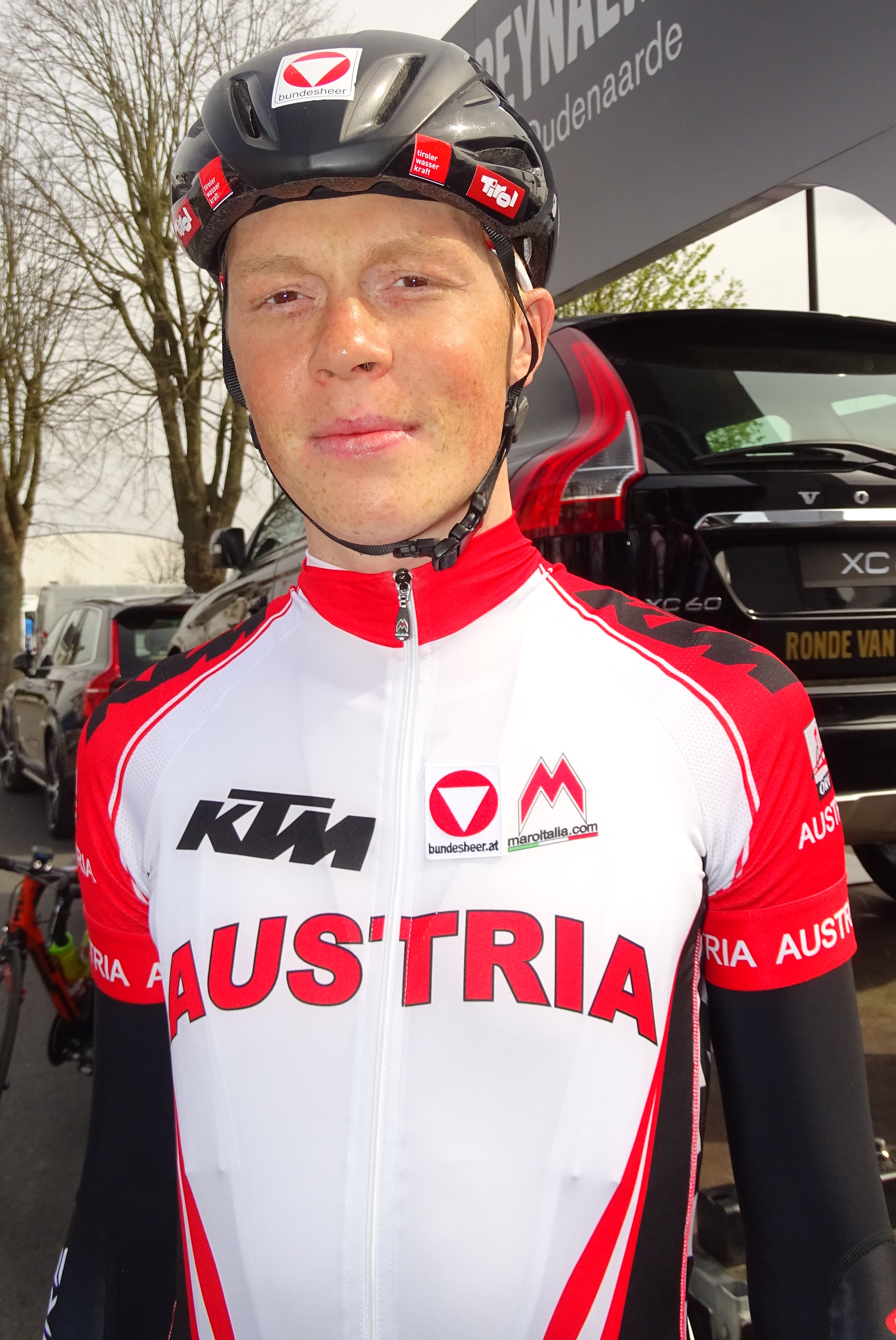
- Bosman in 2016

Personal information
- Full name: Patrick Bosman
- Born: 16 January 1994 (age 32) Wörgl, Tirol, Austria

Cycling career
- Sport: Cycling
- Current team: Retired
- Discipline: Road
- Role: Rider

Professional teams
- 2013–2016: Tirol Cycling Team
- 2017–2019: Hrinkow Advarics Cycleang

Patrick Bosman (born 16 January 1994 in Haren, Groningen) is a Dutch-born Austrian former professional cyclist, who rode between 2013 and 2019 for the Tirol Cycling Team and Hrinkow Advarics Cycleang.

== Major results ==
2014
8th Overall Oberösterreichrundfahrt
2015
8th Overall Tour of China I
2017
1st Overall Tour of Szeklerland

1st Stage 2
