= Mattia Bais =

Italian cyclist (born 1996)

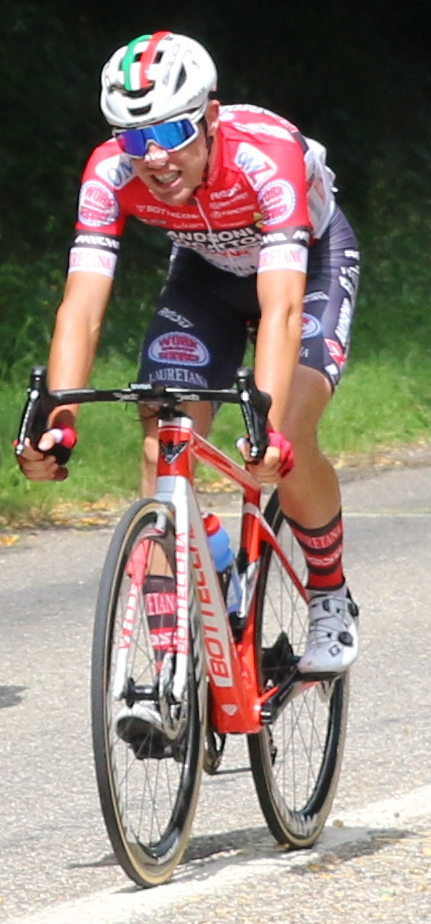
- Mattia Bais at the 2021 Tour Alsace

Personal information
- Nickname: "La freccia di Nogaredo"
- Born: 19 October 1996 (age 29) Rovereto, Italy
- Height: 1.75 m (5 ft 9 in)
- Weight: 66 kg (146 lb)

Cycling career
- Sport: Cycling
- Current team: Team Polti VisitMalta
- Discipline: Road
- Role: Rider

Amateur teams
- 2015: Event Soullimit Cyber
- 2016–2019: Cycling Team Friuli
- 2019: Androni Giocattoli–Sidermec (stagiaire)

Professional teams
- 2020–2022: Androni Giocattoli–Sidermec
- 2023–: Eolo–Kometa

Mattia Bais (born 19 October 1996) is an Italian cyclist, who currently rides for UCI ProTeam Team Polti VisitMalta. Professional since 2020, he has competed in three editions of the Giro d'Italia. His brother Davide is also a professional cyclist on the same team.

== Major results ==
2014
9th G.P. Sportivi Sovilla
2016
10th Gran Premio Sportivi di Poggiana
2017
4th GP Kranj
5th Raiffeisen Grand Prix
6th Croatia–Slovenia
2018
5th Overall Tour of Romania
6th Overall Carpathian Couriers Race

1st Stage 6

7th Trofeo Città di San Vendemiano
10th GP Kranj
2019
2nd Overall Giro della Friuli Venezia Giulia

1st Mountains classification

6th Overall Tour of Bihor
8th Overall Sibiu Cycling Tour
2021
9th Trofeo Matteotti
10th Memorial Marco Pantani
10th Coppa Ugo Agostoni
2022
10th Overall Circuit de la Sarthe
Giro d'Italia

Combativity award Stages 3 & 5

2024
3rd Giro della Romagna
6th Giro del Veneto
10th Overall CRO Race
Combativity award Stage 5 Giro d'Italia

=== Grand Tour general classification results timeline ===
Grand Tour	2020	2021	2022	2023	2024
Giro d'Italia	102	—	82	47	61
Tour de France	—	—	—	—	
Vuelta a España	—	—	—	—	

Legend
—	Did not compete
DNF	Did not finish
