= Leonardo Bonifazio =

Italian bicycle racer (born 1991)

Personal information
- Full name: Leonardo Bonifazio
- Born: 20 March 1991 (age 35) Cuneo, Italy
- Height: 1.7 m (5 ft 7 in)
- Weight: 63 kg (139 lb)

Cycling career
- Sport: Cycling
- Current team: Retired
- Discipline: Road
- Role: Rider

Amateur teams
- 2010: G.S. Mastromarco–Chianti Sensi
- 2015–2016: Viris Maserati–Sisal Matchpoint
- 2017: Team Colpack
- 2018: AVC Aix-en-Provence
- 2018: Nippo–Vini Fantini–Europa Ovini (stagiaire)

Professional teams
- 2019: Sangemini–Trevigiani–MG.K Vis
- 2020–2021: Total Direct Énergie

Leonardo Bonifazio (born 20 March 1991) is an Italian former cyclist, who competed as a professional from 2019 to 2021. His younger brother Niccolò Bonifazio is also a professional cyclist.

== Major results ==
2016
2nd Trofeo Edil C
9th Circuito del Porto
2017
3rd La Popolarissima
4th Circuito del Porto
2018
4th GP de Fourmies
5th Circuito del Porto
8th Overall Tour du Loir-et-Cher

1st Stage 1
