= Konrad Geßner (cyclist) =

German cyclist

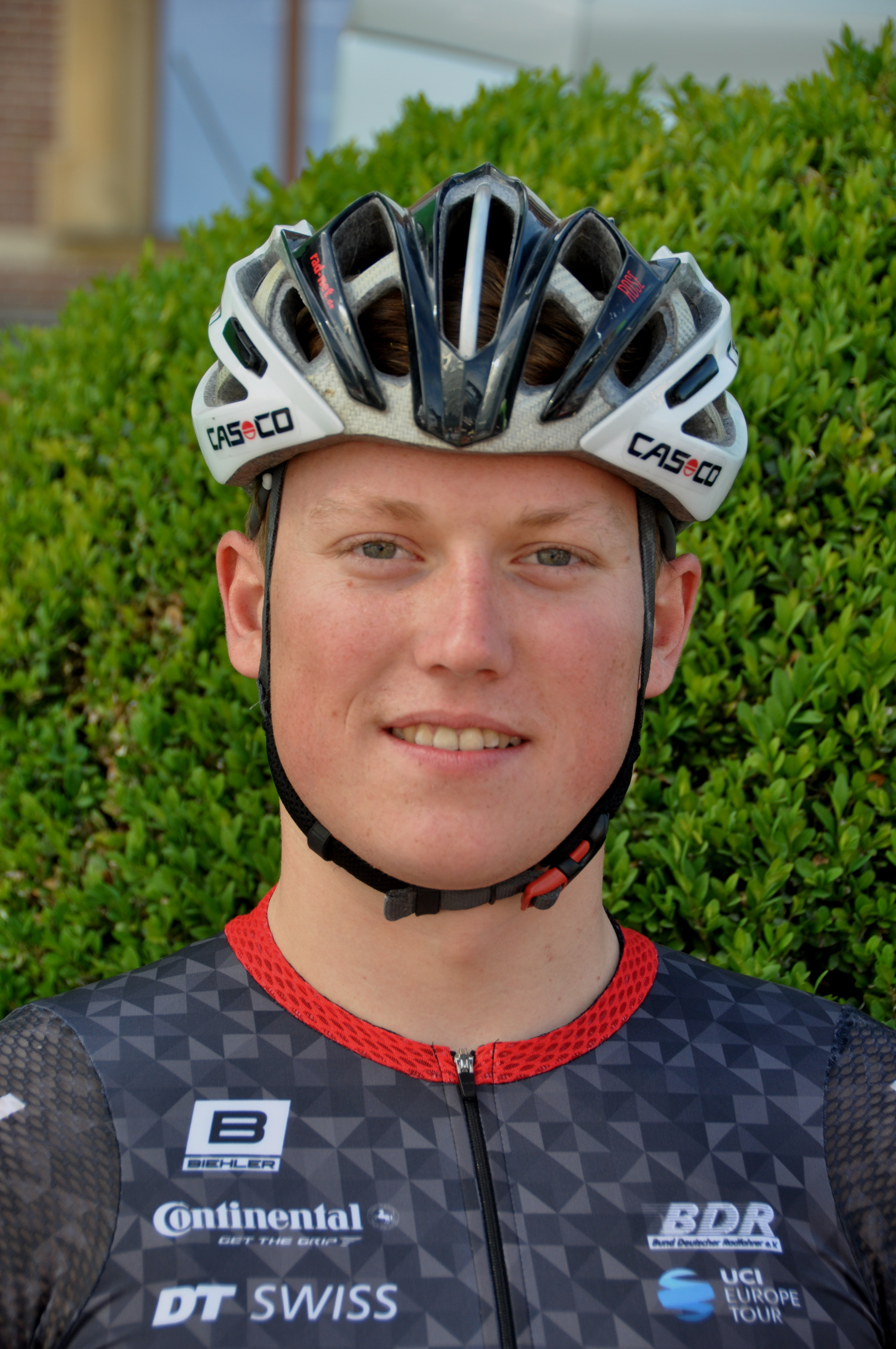
- Geßner in 2017

Personal information
- Full name: Konrad Geßner
- Born: 25 December 1995 (age 30) Erfurt, Germany

Cycling career
- Sport: Cycling
- Current team: Retired
- Discipline: Road
- Role: Rider

Amateur teams
- 2005–2016: RSC Turbine Erfurt
- 2012–2013: Stevens Juniorenteam Thüringen
- 2014–2016: Jenatec Thüringen

Professional teams
- 2017: Rad-Net Rose Team
- 2018–2019: Leopard Pro Cycling

Konrad Geßner (born 25 December 1995 in Erfurt) is a German former professional cyclist, who rode professionally between 2017 and 2019 for the Rad-Net Rose Team and Leopard Pro Cycling teams.

== Major results ==
2016
1st Eschborn-Frankfurt City Loop U23
2nd Road race, National Under-23 Road Championships
6th Road race, National Road Championships
2017
2nd Memorial Grundmanna I Wizowskiego
7th Umag Trophy
10th Kampioenschap van Vlaanderen
