= Tour of Bihor =

Cycling race in Bihor, Romania

Tour of Bihor-Bellotto

Race details
- Date: May/June
- Region: Bihor
- Local name: Turul Ciclist al Bihorului
- Discipline: Road
- Competition: UCI Europe Tour
- Type: Stage race
- Organiser: Bellotto
- Race director: Otto Salamon
- Web site: tourofbihor.ro

History
- First edition: 18 May 2016; 10 years ago
- Editions: 4 (as of 2019)
- First winner: Egan Bernal (COL)
- Most wins: No repeat winners
- Most recent: Daniel Muñoz (COL)

The Tour of Bihor-Bellotto is a multi-day cycling race in Bihor, Romania established 2016. It is part of UCI Europe Tour in category 2.1.

== Winners ==
Year	Country	Rider	Team
2016	Colombia	Egan Bernal	Androni Giocattoli–Sidermec
2017	Colombia	Rodolfo Torres	Androni–Sidermec–Bottecchia
2018	Colombia	Iván Sosa	Androni Giocattoli–Sidermec
2019	Colombia	Daniel Muñoz	Androni Giocattoli–Sidermec
2020	No race due to the COVID-19 pandemic		
