= Matteo Draperi =

Italian cyclist

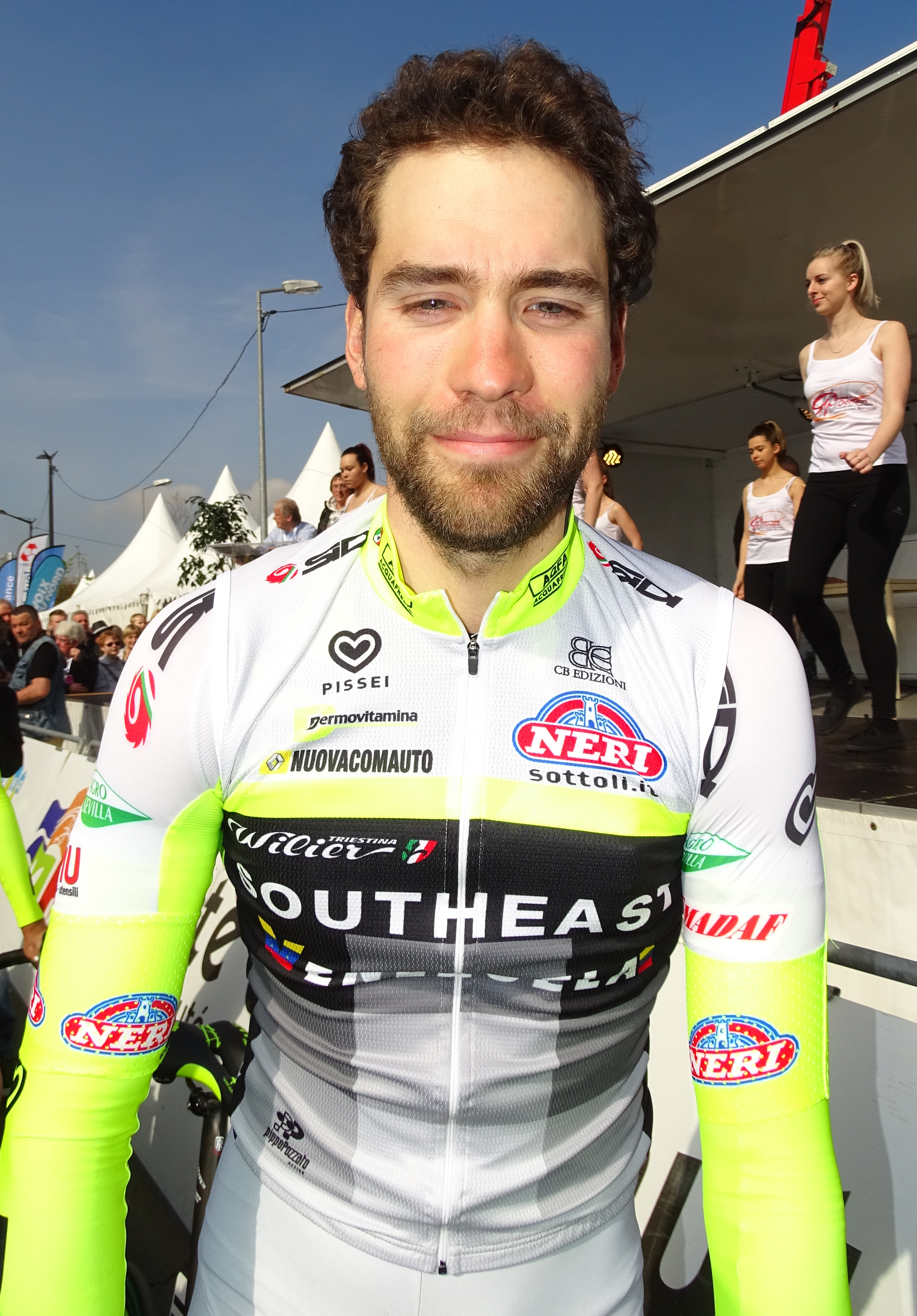

Personal information
- Full name: Matteo Draperi
- Born: 17 January 1991 (age 35) Cuneo, Italy

Cycling career
- Sport: Cycling
- Current team: Team Cycliste Azuréen
- Discipline: Road
- Role: Rider

Amateur teams
- 2010–2012: Brunero Camel Pedalando in Langa
- 2013: Chambery Cyclisme Formation
- 2014–2015: U.C. Monaco
- 2019–: Team Cycliste Azuréen

Professional teams
- 2016–2017: Southeast–Venezuela
- 2018: Sangemini–MG.K Vis Vega

Matteo Draperi (born 17 January 1991) is an Italian road bicycle racer, who currently rides for French amateur squad Team Cycliste Azuréen.

== Career ==
Up through the junior category, Draperi was one of the leading cyclists in his country, finishing second in the national road championship twice, as well as a two-time winner of the challenge "Oscar tuttoBICI". He began the U23 category with physical pain, and underwent a surgical operation to the vertebral column. Because of this problem, he had few results in this category. However, he turned professional in 2016 with Southeast–Venezuela.

== Major results ==
2008
2nd Overall Tre Ciclistica Internazionale Bresciana

1st Young rider classification

5th Overall Giro della Toscana
2009
8th Overall 3 Giorni Orobica
10th Trofeo Emilio Paganessi
2018
8th GP Izola
10th Overall Belgrade Banjaluka
