= Daniel Lehner =

Austrian cyclist (born 1994)

Personal information
- Born: 14 April 1994 (age 32)

Cycling career
- Sport: Cycling
- Current team: Team Felt–Felbermayr
- Discipline: Road
- Role: Rider

Amateur team
- 2020: Team Melasan Sport

Professional teams
- 2013–2014: Gourmetfein–Simplon
- 2015–2016: Team Vorarlberg
- 2017–2019: Team Felbermayr–Simplon Wels
- 2021–: Team Felbermayr–Simplon Wels

Daniel Lehner (born 14 April 1994) is an Austrian racing cyclist, who currently rides for UCI Continental team Team Felt–Felbermayr. He rode for Team Felbermayr–Simplon Wels in the men's team time trial event at the 2018 UCI Road World Championships.

== Major results ==
2018
1st Mountains classification Tour of Antalya
