= Johannes Schinnagel =

German cyclist

Personal information
- Full name: Johannes Schinnagel
- Born: 29 May 1996 (age 30)
- Height: 1.88 m (6 ft 2 in)
- Weight: 68 kg (150 lb)

Cycling career
- Sport: Cycling
- Current team: Team Vorarlberg
- Discipline: Road
- Role: Rider

Amateur teams
- 2007–2014: "forice 89" Dachau
- 2013–2014: Team Auto Eder Bayern
- 2018: Bora–Hansgrohe (stagiaire)

Professional teams
- 2015–2017: Team Felbermayr–Simplon Wels
- 2018: Tirol Cycling Team
- 2019: Maloja Pushbikers
- 2020–: Team Vorarlberg Santic

Johannes Schinnagel (born 29 May 1996) is a German racing cyclist, who currently rides for UCI Continental team Team Vorarlberg. He rode for Tirol Cycling Team in the men's team time trial event at the 2018 UCI Road World Championships.

== Major results ==
2018
1st Stage 1 (TTT) Czech Cycling Tour
6th Overall Tour of Antalya
9th Giro del Belvedere
10th Ghent–Wevelgem U23
2019
10th Overall Oberösterreichrundfahrt
