= Niccolò Salvietti =

Italian cyclist

Personal information
- Full name: Niccolò Salvietti
- Born: 3 November 1993 (age 32)

Cycling career
- Sport: Cycling
- Current team: MG.K Vis Costruzioni e Ambiente
- Discipline: Road
- Role: Rider

Amateur teams
- 2012–2013: Futura Matricardi
- 2014: GFDD Altopack
- 2014–2015: Big Hunter Seanese

Professional team
- 2016–: Norda–MG.K Vis Vega

Niccolò Salvietti (born 3 November 1993) is an Italian racing cyclist, who currently rides for UCI Continental team MG.K Vis Costruzioni e Ambiente. He competed in the men's team time trial event at the 2017 UCI Road World Championships.

== Major results ==
2017
7th Belgrade Banjaluka I
2019
3rd Gemenc Grand Prix I
