= Team Hrinkow Advarics =

Austrian cycling team

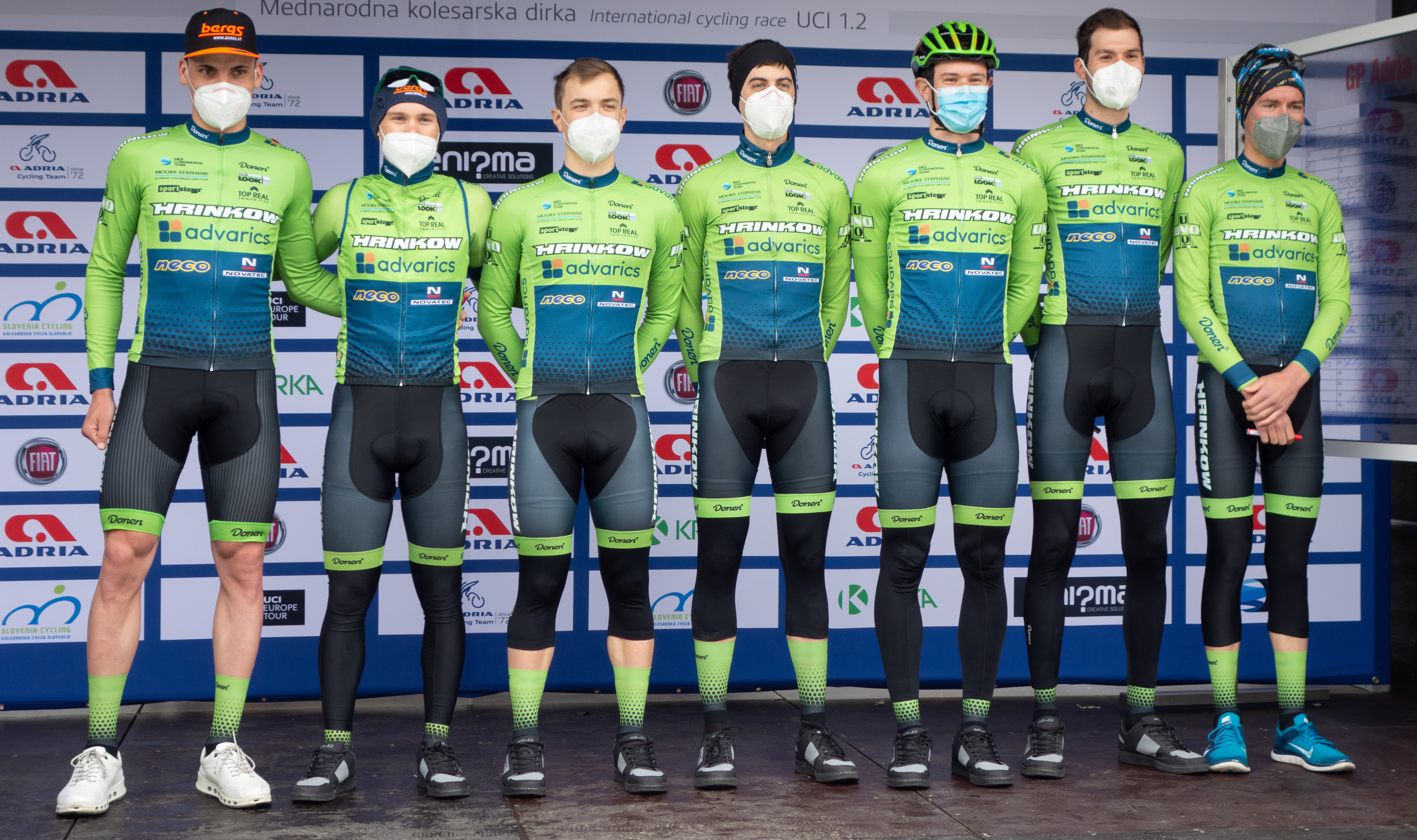

Team information
- UCI code: HAC
- Registered: Austria
- Founded: 2015
- Discipline: Road
- Status: UCI Continental
- Bicycles: Hrinkow
- Website: Team home page

Key personnel
- General manager: Alexander Hrinkow
- Team managers: Matej Mugerli; Andreas Hofer

Team name history
- 2015–2022 2023–: Hrinkow Advarics Cycleang; Hrinkow Advarics
Team Hrinkow Advarics jersey
Jersey

Team Hrinkow Advarics is an Austrian UCI Continental team founded in 2015. It participates in UCI Continental Circuits races.

== Team roster ==
As of 23 May 2023.

Rider	Date of birth
Daniel Eichinger (AUT)	23 October 1995 (age 30)
Marvin Hammerschmid (AUT)	5 January 1996 (age 30)
Raphael Hammerschmid (AUT)	5 January 1996 (age 30)
Žiga Horvat (SLO)	13 September 1998 (age 27)
Michael Konczer (AUT)	10 October 1993 (age 32)
Stefan Kovar (AUT)	15 May 2002 (age 24)

Rider	Date of birth
Timon Loderer (GER)	20 April 1991 (age 35)
Jaka Primožič (SLO)	8 December 1998 (age 27)
Jonas Rapp (GER)	16 July 1994 (age 32)
Edward Ravasi (ITA)	5 June 1994 (age 32)
Johannes Rechenauer (GER)	23 December 1995 (age 30)
Riccardo Verza (ITA)	22 August 1997 (age 29)

== Major wins ==
2015
Stage 7 Rás Tailteann, Andreas Müller
Overall Tour of Szeklerland, Clemens Fankhauser

Stage 2, Clemens Fankhauser

2017
Overall Tour of Szeklerland, Patrick Bosman

Stage 1, Christian Mager
Stage 2, Patrick Bosman

2019
Overall Tour of Szeklerland, Jonas Rapp

Stage 2, Dominik Hrinkow

2021
Overall Giro della Regione Friuli Venezia Giulia, Jonas Rapp

Stage 2, Jonas Rapp
