= Andreas Hofer (cyclist) =

Austrian cyclist (born 1991)

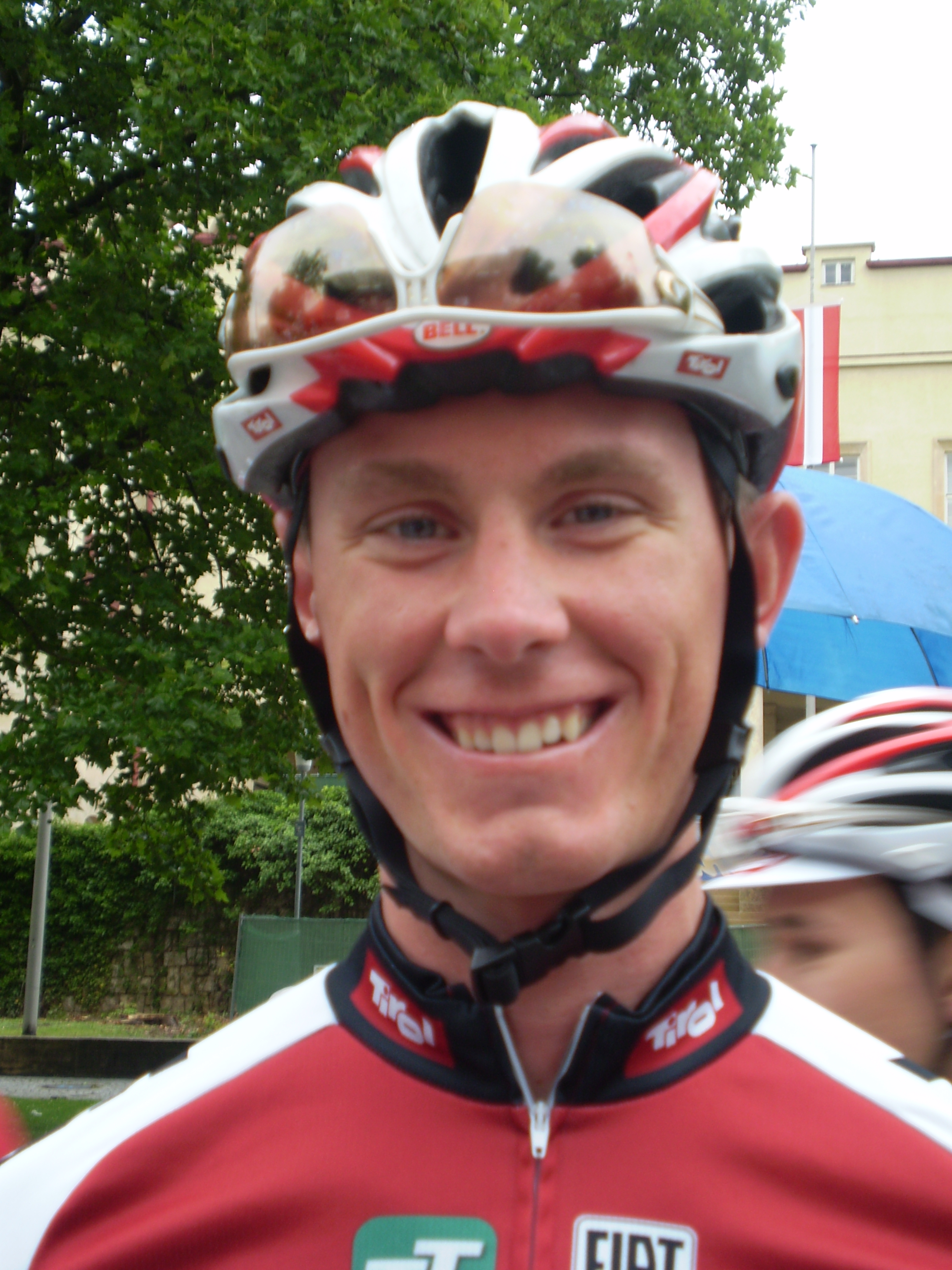
- Hofer in 2011

Personal information
- Full name: Andreas Hofer
- Born: 8 February 1991 (age 35) Wiener Neustadt, Austria

Cycling career
- Sport: Cycling
- Current team: Hrinkow Advarics
- Discipline: Road
- Role: Rider (retired); Directeur sportif
- Rider type: Time trialist

Professional teams
- 2010–2011: Tyrol–Team Radland Tirol
- 2012–2014: Team Vorarlberg
- 2015–2020: Hrinkow Advarics Cycleangteam

Managerial team
- 2021–: Hrinkow Advarics Cycleang

Andreas Hofer (born 8 February 1991 in Wiener Neustadt) is an Austrian former professional cyclist, who rode professionally between 2010 and 2020 for the Tyrol Team, Team Vorarlberg and Hrinkow Advarics Cycleang. He now works as a directeur sportif for UCI Continental team Hrinkow Advarics.

== Major results ==
2009
1st Stage 7 Tour de l'Abitibi
2nd Time trial, National Junior Road Championships
2011
National Road Championships

1st Time trial
1st Under-23 road race
1st Under-23 time trial
3rd Road race

2012
National Road Championships

1st Under-23 time trial
3rd Time trial

3rd Duo Normand (with Robert Vrečer)
2013
National Road Championships

1st Under-23 time trial
3rd Time trial

2014
3rd Time trial, National Road Championships
3rd Overall Kreiz Breizh Elites
6th Race Horizon Park 1
10th Overall Tour of China I
2015
6th Belgrade–Banja Luka I
2017
8th Overall Tour of Szeklerland
2018
5th Croatia–Slovenia
