= 2020 UCI Road World Championships – Men's road race =

Cycling race

Men's road race
2020 UCI Road World Championships

Race details
- Dates: 27 September 2020
- Stages: 1
- Distance: 258.2 km (160.4 mi)
- Winning time: 6h 38' 34"

Medalists
	Gold	(France) Julian Alaphilippe (FRA)
	Silver	(Belgium) Wout van Aert (BEL)
	Bronze	(Switzerland) Marc Hirschi (SUI)

The Men's road race of the 2020 UCI Road World Championships was a cycling event that took place on 27 September 2020 in Imola, Italy. Mads Pedersen was the defending champion, but he did not compete in the race.

For the first time since 1997, a French male rider won the rainbow jersey as Julian Alaphilippe attacked on the final climb of the Cima Gallisterna; he managed to hold off a chasing group of five riders by 24 seconds to take victory at the finish line, at the Autodromo Internazionale Enzo e Dino Ferrari. The silver medal went to Belgium's Wout van Aert – his second of the week – while the bronze medal was taken by Marc Hirschi from Switzerland.

The race took place on a 28.8 kilometres (17.9 mi) course, starting and finishing at the Autodromo Internazionale Enzo e Dino Ferrari (a motor racing circuit). Heading out from the Autodromo into the Emilia-Romagna countryside, the course used two climbs with an average gradient of 10% separated by the town of Riolo Terme, before returning to the Autodromo. The men's road race lapped the course nine times, making a total of 258.2 kilometres (160.4 mi).

== Qualification ==
Qualification was based mainly on the UCI World Ranking by nations as of 17 March 2020.

=== UCI World Rankings ===
The following nations qualified.

Criterium	Rank	Number of riders		Nations
Criterium	Rank	To enter	To start	Nations
UCI World Ranking by Nations	1–10	13	8	Belgium; Italy; France; Colombia; Netherlands; Germany; Slovenia; Australia; Spain; Denmark
UCI World Ranking by Nations	11–20	9	6	Great Britain; Norway; Switzerland; Russia; Austria; Ireland; Kazakhstan; Poland; Ecuador; Slovakia
UCI World Ranking by Nations	21–30	7	4	Canada; Portugal; South Africa; Czech Republic; United States; Estonia; Eritrea; Algeria; New Zealand; Latvia
UCI World Ranking by Nations	31–52	2	1	Turkey; Belarus; Luxembourg; Ukraine; Costa Rica; Japan; Greece; Romania; Hungary; Morocco; Venezuela; Iran; Azerbaijan; Lithuania; Sweden; Rwanda; Guatemala; Mexico; Hong Kong; Argentina; China; Moldova
UCI World Ranking by Individuals (if not already qualified)	1–200	2	1	—N/a

=== Participating nations ===
177 cyclists from 43 nations competed in the event. The number of cyclists per nation is shown in parentheses.

- Australia (8)
- Austria (6)
- Azerbaijan (1)
- Belarus (1)
- Belgium (8)
- Canada (4)
- Colombia (8)
- Costa Rica (1)
- Czech Republic (4)
- Denmark (8)
- Ecuador (3)
- Eritrea (3)
- Estonia (2)
- France (8)
- Germany (8)
- Great Britain (6)
- Greece (1)
- Hungary (1)
- Ireland (3)
- Italy (8)
- Japan (1)
- Kazakhstan (6)
- Latvia (3)
- Lithuania (1)
- Luxembourg (1)
- Mexico (1)
- Morocco (1)
- Netherlands (8)
- New Zealand (4)
- Norway (6)
- Poland (6)
- Portugal (4)
- Romania (1)
- Russia (6)
- Rwanda (1)
- Slovakia (5)
- Slovenia (8)
- South Africa (2)
- Spain (8)
- Sweden (1)
- Switzerland (6)
- Ukraine (1)
- United States (4)

== Final classification ==
177 cyclists were listed to start the 258.2-kilometre (160.4 mi)-long course. However, Alexey Lutsenko was forced to withdraw from the race after testing positive for COVID-19, while Nikias Arndt and Natnael Berhane also did not start. 88 riders completed the full distance.

Rank	Rider	Country	Time
1	Julian Alaphilippe	France	6h 38' 34"
2	Wout van Aert	Belgium	+ 24"
3	Marc Hirschi	Switzerland	+ 24"
4	Michał Kwiatkowski	Poland	+ 24"
5	Jakob Fuglsang	Denmark	+ 24"
6	Primož Roglič	Slovenia	+ 24"
7	Michael Matthews	Australia	+ 53"
8	Alejandro Valverde	Spain	+ 53"
9	Maximilian Schachmann	Germany	+ 53"
10	Damiano Caruso	Italy	+ 53"
11	Michael Valgren	Denmark	+ 53"
12	Michael Woods	Canada	+ 53"
13	Guillaume Martin	France	+ 53"
14	Tom Dumoulin	Netherlands	+ 53"
15	Vincenzo Nibali	Italy	+ 57"
16	Mikel Landa	Spain	+ 57"
17	Simon Geschke	Germany	+ 1' 34"
18	Alberto Bettiol	Italy	+ 1' 34"
19	Rudy Molard	France	+ 1' 34"
20	Pello Bilbao	Spain	+ 1' 34"
21	Greg Van Avermaet	Belgium	+ 1' 34"
22	Richard Carapaz	Ecuador	+ 1' 34"
23	Fausto Masnada	Italy	+ 1' 34"
24	Rigoberto Urán	Colombia	+ 1' 34"
25	Richie Porte	Australia	+ 1' 34"
26	Rui Costa	Portugal	+ 2' 03"
27	Jan Polanc	Slovenia	+ 2' 03"
28	Jesús Herrada	Spain	+ 2' 03"
29	Toms Skujiņš	Latvia	+ 3' 40"
30	Tiesj Benoot	Belgium	+ 3' 44"
31	Daniel Martínez	Colombia	+ 3' 44"
32	Esteban Chaves	Colombia	+ 3' 44"
33	Tadej Pogačar	Slovenia	+ 3' 44"
34	Valentin Madouas	France	+ 5' 15"
35	Dylan van Baarle	Netherlands	+ 5' 48"
36	Markus Hoelgaard	Norway	+ 5' 54"
37	Kenny Elissonde	France	+ 8' 30"
38	Nelson Oliveira	Portugal	+ 8' 49"
39	Tim Wellens	Belgium	+ 9' 24"
40	Loïc Vliegen	Belgium	+ 9' 24"
41	Miguel Ángel López	Colombia	+ 9' 24"
42	Tom Pidcock	Great Britain	+ 9' 24"
43	Giovanni Visconti	Italy	+ 10' 32"
44	Simon Clarke	Australia	+ 10' 32"
45	Sam Oomen	Netherlands	+ 10' 32"
46	Enrico Gasparotto	Switzerland	+ 10' 32"
47	Diego Ulissi	Italy	+ 10' 32"
48	Sergio Higuita	Colombia	+ 10' 32"
49	Vadim Pronskiy	Kazakhstan	+ 10' 32"
50	Sergio Henao	Colombia	+ 10' 32"
51	Nicolas Roche	Ireland	+ 10' 32"
52	Luis León Sánchez	Spain	+ 10' 32"
53	Sepp Kuss	United States	+ 12' 35"
54	Sebastian Schönberger	Austria	+ 15' 25"
55	Georg Zimmermann	Germany	+ 15' 25"
56	Andreas Leknessund	Norway	+ 15' 27"
57	Andrea Bagioli	Italy	+ 15' 27"
58	Krists Neilands	Latvia	+ 16' 20"
59	Jan Hirt	Czech Republic	+ 19' 42"
60	Jonas Gregaard	Denmark	+ 19' 42"
61	Hugo Houle	Canada	+ 19' 42"
62	Dmitry Strakhov	Russia	+ 20' 13"
63	Nico Denz	Germany	+ 21' 59"
64	Jakub Otruba	Czech Republic	+ 21' 59"
65	Casper Pedersen	Denmark	+ 21' 59"
66	Paul Martens	Germany	+ 21' 59"
67	Merhawi Kudus	Eritrea	+ 21' 59"
68	Martijn Tusveld	Netherlands	+ 21' 59"
69	Amanuel Ghebreigzabhier	Eritrea	+ 21' 59"
70	Łukasz Owsian	Poland	+ 21' 59"
71	Adam Ťoupalík	Czech Republic	+ 21' 59"
72	Maciej Paterski	Poland	+ 21' 59"
73	Carl Fredrik Hagen	Norway	+ 21' 59"
74	Yuriy Natarov	Kazakhstan	+ 21' 59"
75	Sergey Chernetskiy	Russia	+ 21' 59"
76	Attila Valter	Hungary	+ 21' 59"
77	Christopher Juul-Jensen	Denmark	+ 21' 59"
78	Louis Meintjes	South Africa	+ 21' 59"
79	Pieter Weening	Netherlands	+ 21' 59"
80	Jonathan Caicedo	Ecuador	+ 21' 59"
81	James Shaw	Great Britain	+ 21' 59"
82	Ivan Rovny	Russia	+ 21' 59"
83	Michał Gołaś	Poland	+ 21' 59"
84	Torstein Træen	Norway	+ 21' 59"
85	Lucas Eriksson	Sweden	+ 21' 59"
86	Ethan Hayter	Great Britain	+ 22' 03"
87	Anatoliy Budyak	Ukraine	+ 28' 05"
88	Ivo Oliveira	Portugal	+ 32' 08"

Rider	Country	Time
Gianluca Brambilla	Italy	DNF
James Knox	Great Britain	DNF
Jai Hindley	Australia	DNF
Dion Smith	New Zealand	DNF
Luke Rowe	Great Britain	DNF
Jasper Stuyven	Belgium	DNF
Pieter Serry	Belgium	DNF
Pascal Eenkhoorn	Netherlands	DNF
Antwan Tolhoek	Netherlands	DNF
Vegard Stake Laengen	Norway	DNF
Jesper Hansen	Denmark	DNF
Chris Hamilton	Australia	DNF
George Bennett	New Zealand	DNF
Nick Schultz	Australia	DNF
Yukiya Arashiro	Japan	DNF
Nans Peters	France	DNF
Julien Bernard	France	DNF
Quentin Pacher	France	DNF
John Degenkolb	Germany	DNF
Luka Mezgec	Slovenia	DNF
Enric Mas	Spain	DNF
David de la Cruz	Spain	DNF
Marc Soler	Spain	DNF
Alexander Cataford	Canada	DNF
Tanel Kangert	Estonia	DNF
Oliver Naesen	Belgium	DNF
Harold Tejada	Colombia	DNF
Denis Nekrasov	Russia	DNF
Jonas Koch	Germany	DNF
Alexandr Riabushenko	Belarus	DNF
Damien Howson	Australia	DNF
Janez Brajkovič	Slovenia	DNF
Neilson Powless	United States	DNF
Brandon McNulty	United States	DNF
Peeter Pruus	Estonia	DNF
Jan Tratnik	Slovenia	DNF
Jefferson Cepeda	Ecuador	DNF
Niklas Eg	Denmark	DNF
Ben Gastauer	Luxembourg	DNF
Vyacheslav Kuznetsov	Russia	DNF
Michael Albasini	Switzerland	DNF
Guillaume Boivin	Canada	DNF
Evaldas Šiškevičius	Lithuania	DNF
Domen Novak	Slovenia	DNF
Luke Durbridge	Australia	DNF
Tobias Bayer	Austria	DNF
Josef Černý	Czech Republic	DNF
Patrik Tybor	Slovakia	DNF
Mikkel Frølich Honoré	Denmark	DNF
Michael Schär	Switzerland	DNF
Ruben Guerreiro	Portugal	DNF
Cristian Camilo Muñoz	Colombia	DNF
Felix Gall	Austria	DNF
Riccardo Zoidl	Austria	DNF
Kamil Małecki	Poland	DNF
Daniil Fominykh	Kazakhstan	DNF
Ben Healy	Ireland	DNF
Nick van der Lijke	Netherlands	DNF
Petr Rikunov	Russia	DNF
Silvan Dillier	Switzerland	DNF
Simon Pellaud	Switzerland	DNF
Finn Fisher-Black	New Zealand	DNF
Abderrahim Zahiri	Morocco	DNF
Odd Christian Eiking	Norway	DNF
Stanisław Aniołkowski	Poland	DNF
Viesturs Lukševics	Latvia	DNF
Patrick Bevin	New Zealand	DNF
Martin Haring	Slovakia	DNF
Kevin Rivera	Costa Rica	DNF
Luka Pibernik	Slovenia	DNF
Nicholas Dlamini	South Africa	DNF
Ulises Alfredo Castillo	Mexico	DNF
Eduard-Michael Grosu	Romania	DNF
Marco Friedrich	Austria	DNF
Hugh Carthy	Great Britain	DNF
Lawson Craddock	United States	DNF
Ján Andrej Cully	Slovakia	DNF
Marek Čanecký	Slovakia	DNF
Polychronis Tzortzakis	Greece	DNF
Juraj Bellan	Slovakia	DNF
Samuel Mugisha	Rwanda	DNF
Elchin Asadov	Azerbaijan	DNF
Dmitriy Gruzdev	Kazakhstan	DNF
Markus Wildauer	Austria	DNF
Ryan Mullen	Ireland	DNF
Zhandos Bizhigitov	Kazakhstan	DNF
Nikias Arndt	Germany	DNS
Alexey Lutsenko	Kazakhstan	DNS
Natnael Berhane	Eritrea	DNS
