= Gregor Mühlberger =

Austrian cyclist

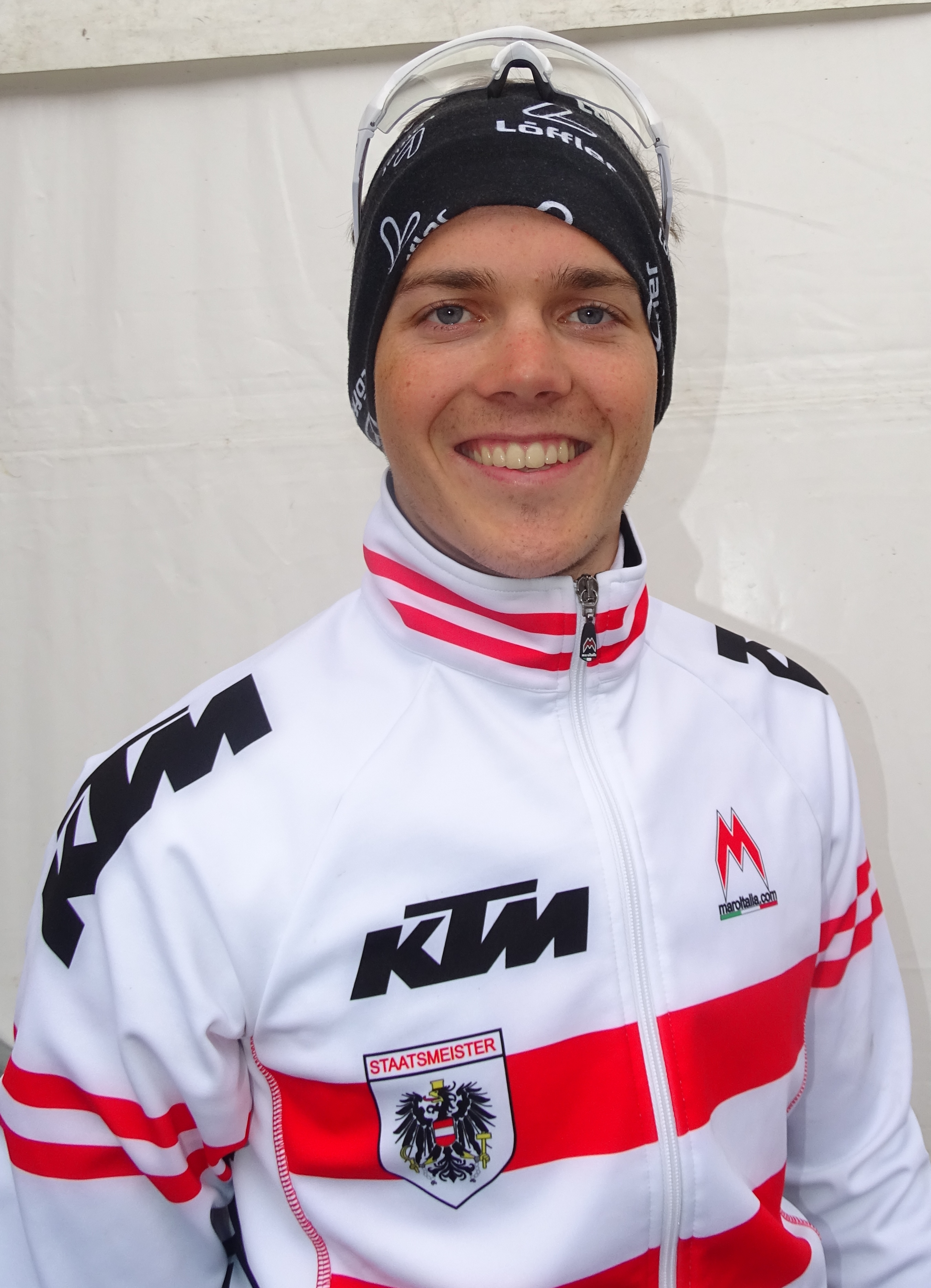
- Mühlberger in 2015

Personal information
- Full name: Gregor Mühlberger
- Born: 4 April 1994 (age 32) Haidershofen, Austria
- Height: 1.80 m (5 ft 11 in)
- Weight: 64 kg (141 lb)

Cycling career
- Sport: Cycling
- Current team: Decathlon CMA CGM
- Discipline: Road
- Role: Rider
- Rider type: Climber

Professional teams
- 2013–2014: Tirol Cycling Team
- → 2014: NetApp–Endura (stagiaire)
- 2015: Team Felbermayr–Simplon Wels
- → 2015: Bora–Argon 18 (stagiaire)
- 2016–2020: Bora–Argon 18
- 2021–2025: Movistar Team
- 2026–: Decathlon CMA CGM

Major wins
- One-day races and Classics National Road Race Championships (2017, 2023)

Gregor Mühlberger (born 4 April 1994) is an Austrian cyclist, who currently rides for the UCI WorldTeam Decathlon CMA CGM.

== Career ==
He rode in the 2016 Vuelta a España and the 2017 Giro d'Italia, and in the 2018 Tour de France. He finished 70th representing Austria at the 2020 Summer Olympics in the Men's individual road race

Mühlberger signed with Movistar Team in 2021.

He signed for Decathlon CMA CGM ahead of the 2026 season. Hw rode in the 2026 Vuelta where he was a key lieutenant for team leader Felix Gall, until he crashed on stage 13.

== Major results ==
2012
1st Mountains classification, Oberösterreich Juniorenrundfahrt
2nd Road race, National Junior Road Championships
2013
6th Overall Tour of Al Zubarah
2014
National Under-23 Road Championships

1st Road race
1st Time trial

1st Overall Carpathian Couriers Race

1st Young rider classification
1st Stage 3 (ITT)

1st Trofeo Banca Popolare di Vicenza
Internationaler Radsporttage Purgstall

1st Stages 1, 2 & 3

National Road Championships

2nd Time trial
2nd Road race

2nd Overall Oberösterreich Rundfahrt

1st Stage 3

4th Overall Istrian Spring Trophy

1st Prologue

6th Raiffeisen Grand Prix
8th Tour Bohemia
9th La Côte Picarde
2015
1st Overall Oberösterreich Rundfahrt

1st Points classification
1st Austrian rider classification
1st Stage 4

1st Overall Course de la Paix Under-23

1st Points classification
1st Stage 2

1st GP Izola
1st Raiffeisen Grand Prix
2nd Giro del Belvedere
National Road Championships

5th Road race
5th Time trial

2016
2nd Road race, National Road Championships
2nd Rudi Altig Race
2017 (2 pro wins)
1st Road race, National Road Championships
1st Rund um Köln
4th Overall Tour of Slovenia
2018 (1)
2nd Trofeo Lloseta–Andratx
5th Trofeo Serra de Tramuntana
8th Overall BinckBank Tour

1st Stage 6

10th Strade Bianche
2019
3rd Road race, National Road Championships
2020 (3)
1st Overall Sibiu Cycling Tour

1st Points classification
1st Mountains classification
1st Stages 1 & 3a (ITT)

2nd Pollença–Andratx
3rd Trofeo Serra de Tramuntana
2023 (3)
1st Road race, National Road Championships
1st Stage 2 Deutschland Tour
1st Stage 4 Tour of the Alps
7th Overall Tour of Britain
2024
2nd Road race, National Road Championships
2nd Coppa Sabatini
5th Mercan'Tour Classic
2026 (3)
1st Overall Tour of Austria

1st Stages 1 & 2

=== Grand Tour general classification results timeline ===
Grand Tour	2016	2017	2018	2019	2020	2021	2022	2023	2024	2025	2026
Giro d'Italia	—	41	—	—	—	—	—	—	—	—	15
Tour de France	—	—	76	25	DNF	—	28	44	56	18	—
Vuelta a España	114	—	—	DNF	—	—	50	—	—	—	

Legend
—	Did not compete
DNF	Did not finish
IP	In progress
