= Cycling at the 2019 European Games – Men's omnium =

Men's omnium at the 2019 European Games
- Venue: Minsk Velodrome
- Date: 30 June
- Competitors: 16 from 16 nations
- Winning points: 178

Medalists
gold medal	Jan-Willem van Schip	Netherlands
silver medal	Théry Schir	Switzerland
bronze medal	Daniel Staniszewski	Poland

The men's omnium competition at the 2019 European Games was held at the Minsk Velodrome on 30 June 2019.

== Results ==
=== Scratch race ===
Rank	Name	Nation	Laps down	Event points
1	Daniel Staniszewski	Poland		40
2	Christos Volikakis	Greece		38
3	Jan-Willem van Schip	Netherlands		36
4	Théry Schir	Switzerland		34
5	Petr Kelemen	Czech Republic		32
6	Rui Oliveira	Portugal		30
7	Raman Tsishkou	Belarus		28
8	Fabio Van den Bossche	Belgium		26
9	Liam Bertazzo	Italy		24
10	Valentin Götzinger	Austria		22
11	Jack Murphy	Ireland		20
12	Norman Vahtra	Estonia		18
13	Krisztián Lovassy	Hungary		16
14	Roman Gladysh	Ukraine		14
15	Illart Zuazubiskar	Spain		12
16	Martin Chren	Slovakia		10
	Gleb Syritsa	Russia	Did not start	

=== Tempo race ===
Rank	Name	Nation	Points in race	Event points
1	Théry Schir	Switzerland	20	40
2	Jan-Willem van Schip	Netherlands	6	38
3	Jack Murphy	Ireland	2	36
4	Raman Tsishkou	Belarus	2	34
5	Rui Oliveira	Portugal	2	32
6	Daniel Staniszewski	Poland	2	30
7	Christos Volikakis	Greece	1	28
8	Valentin Götzinger	Austria	1	26
9	Krisztián Lovassy	Hungary	0	24
10	Norman Vahtra	Estonia	0	22
11	Roman Gladysh	Ukraine	0	20
12	Petr Kelemen	Czech Republic	0	18
13	Liam Bertazzo	Italy	0	16
14	Fabio Van den Bossche	Belgium	0	14
15	Illart Zuazubiskar	Spain	0	12
16	Martin Chren	Slovakia	–40	–40

=== Elimination race ===
Rank	Name	Nation	Event points
1	Jan-Willem van Schip	Netherlands	40
2	Théry Schir	Switzerland	38
3	Fabio Van den Bossche	Belgium	36
4	Daniel Staniszewski	Poland	34
5	Raman Tsishkou	Belarus	32
6	Christos Volikakis	Greece	30
7	Rui Oliveira	Portugal	28
8	Liam Bertazzo	Italy	26
9	Petr Kelemen	Czech Republic	24
10	Jack Murphy	Ireland	22
11	Illart Zuazubiskar	Spain	20
12	Krisztián Lovassy	Hungary	18
13	Roman Gladysh	Ukraine	16
14	Norman Vahtra	Estonia	14
15	Valentin Götzinger	Austria	12
16	Martin Chren	Slovakia	10

=== Points race ===
Rank	Name	Nation	Lap points	Sprint points	Total points	Finish order
1	Jan-Willem van Schip	Netherlands	40	24	64	2
2	Théry Schir	Switzerland	20	12	32	14
3	Fabio Van den Bossche	Belgium	20	8	28	6
4	Rui Oliveira	Portugal	20	5	25	10
5	Liam Bertazzo	Italy	0	22	22	3
6	Daniel Staniszewski	Poland	20	2	22	8
7	Norman Vahtra	Estonia	0	17	17	1
8	Christos Volikakis	Greece	0	11	11	4
9	Raman Tsishkou	Belarus	0	9	9	11
10	Jack Murphy	Ireland	0	4	4	9
11	Valentin Götzinger	Austria	0	3	3	5
12	Krisztián Lovassy	Hungary	0	2	2	13
13	Illart Zuazubiskar	Spain	0	1	1	12
14	Roman Gladysh	Ukraine	0	0	0	15
15	Petr Kelemen	Czech Republic	–20	1	–19	7
	Martin Chren	Slovakia	–40	0		DNF

=== Final ranking ===
The final ranking is given by the sum of the points obtained in the 4 specialties.

Overall rank	Name	Nation	Scratch race	Tempo race	Elimin. race	Points race	Total points
1st place, gold medalist(s)	Jan-Willem van Schip	Netherlands	36	38	40	64	178
2nd place, silver medalist(s)	Théry Schir	Switzerland	34	40	38	32	144
3rd place, bronze medalist(s)	Daniel Staniszewski	Poland	40	30	34	22	126
4	Rui Oliveira	Portugal	30	32	28	25	115
5	Christos Volikakis	Greece	38	28	30	11	107
6	Fabio Van den Bossche	Belgium	26	14	36	28	104
7	Raman Tsishkou	Belarus	28	34	32	9	103
8	Liam Bertazzo	Italy	24	16	26	22	88
9	Jack Murphy	Ireland	20	36	22	4	82
10	Norman Vahtra	Estonia	18	22	14	17	71
11	Valentin Götzinger	Austria	22	26	12	3	63
12	Krisztián Lovassy	Hungary	16	24	18	2	60
13	Petr Kelemen	Czech Republic	32	18	24	–19	55
14	Roman Gladysh	Ukraine	14	20	16	0	50
15	Illart Zuazubiskar	Spain	12	12	20	1	45
	Martin Chren	Slovakia	10	–40	10	DNF	
