= Felix Ritzinger =

Austrian cyclist (born 1996)

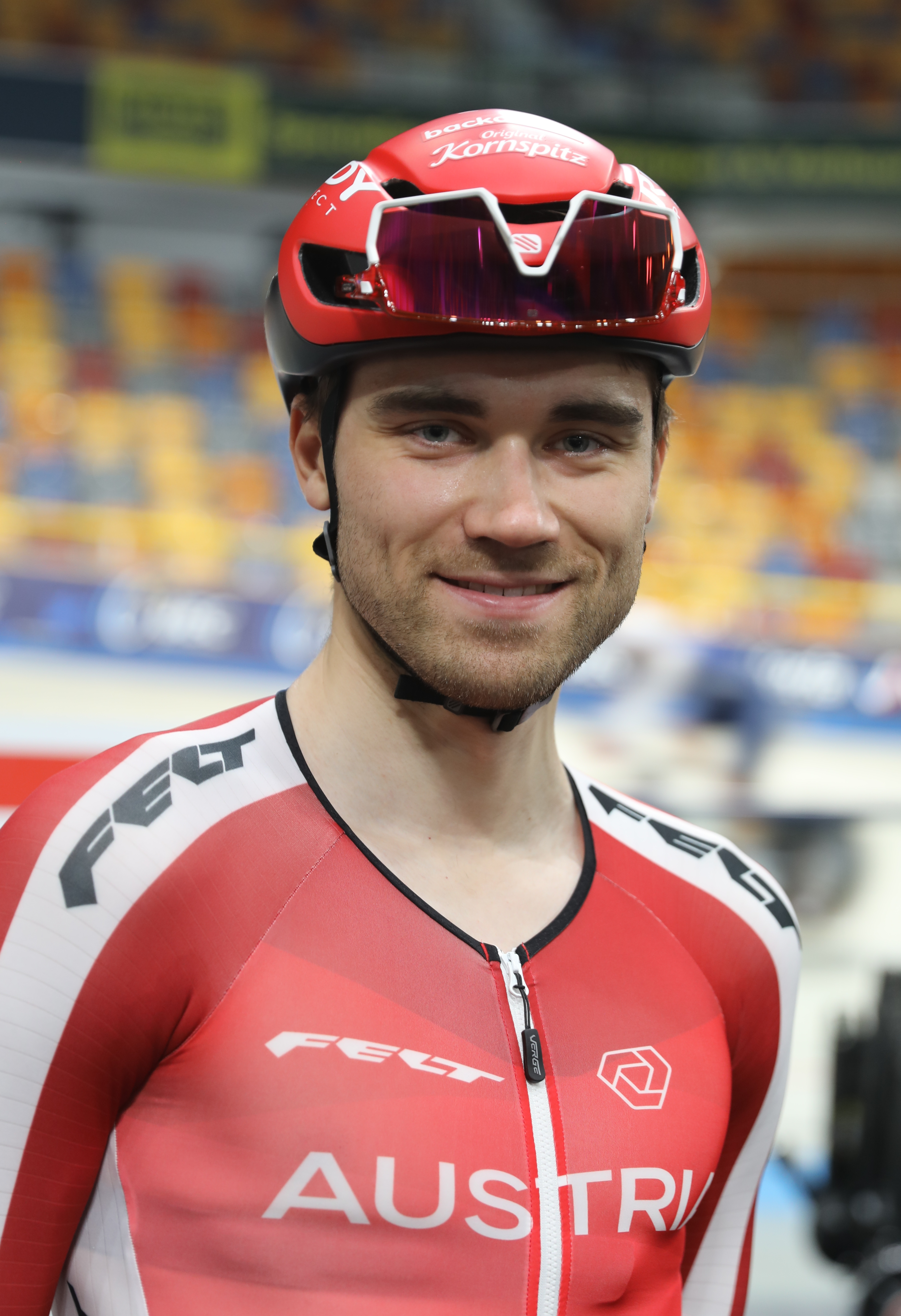
- Ritzinger in 2024

Personal information
- Full name: Felix Ritzinger
- Born: 23 December 1996 (age 29) Vienna, Austria
- Height: 1.91 m (6 ft 3 in)
- Weight: 80 kg (176 lb)

Cycling career
- Sport: Cycling
- Current team: Team Felt–Felbermayr
- Disciplines: Road; Track; Cyclo-cross
- Role: Rider

Amateur team
- 2018: Wohnbefinden Graz ARBÖ

Professional teams
- 2018–2022: WSA–Pushbikers
- 2023–: Team Felbermayr–Simplon Wels

Felix Ritzinger (born 23 December 1996) is an Austrian racing cyclist, who currently rides for UCI Continental team Team Felt–Felbermayr. He rode for WSA–Pushbikers in the men's team time trial event at the 2018 UCI Road World Championships.

== Major results ==
=== Road ===
2019
1st Stage 3b Tour of Szeklerland
4th Time trial, National Road Championships
8th Raiffeisen Grand Prix
2020
3rd Time trial, National Road Championships
2021
2nd Time trial, National Road Championships
2nd GP Slovenia
8th GP Kranj
2022
4th Time trial, National Road Championships
4th GP Vipava Valley & Crossborder Goriška
8th GP Slovenian Istria
2023
2nd Time trial, National Road Championships
8th Grand Prix Poland
2024 (1 pro win)
1st Stage 2 International Tour of Hellas
Tour of Malopolska

1st Points classification
1st Stage 2

4th Overall Tour de Maurice

1st Stage 3

=== Track ===
2015
1st Pursuit, National Track Championships
2016
National Track Championships

1st Pursuit
1st Scratch

2017
National Track Championships

1st Pursuit
1st Scratch

2018
National Track Championships

1st Pursuit
1st Kilometer
1st Keirin

2019
National Track Championships

1st Pursuit
1st Madison (with Tim Wafler)
1st Omnium

2020
National Track Championships

1st Pursuit
1st Madison (with Valentin Götzinger)

2022
National Track Championships

1st Scratch
2nd Points race
2nd Madison

=== Cyclo-cross ===
2015–2016
1st National Under-23 Championships
2016–2017
1st National Under-23 Championships
3rd National Championships
2017–2018
3rd National Championships
2018–2019
2nd National Championships

=== Mountain bike ===
2014
1st National Junior XCO Championships
2016
1st National Under-23 XCO Championships
