= 2009 Tour de Suisse =

2009 UCI World Ranking, race 16 of 24

Race details
- Dates: 13–21 June 2009
- Stages: 9
- Distance: 1,353.4 km (841.0 mi)
- Winning time: 33h 05' 51"

Results
Jersey awarded to the overall winner	Winner	Fabian Cancellara (SUI)	(Team Saxo Bank)
	Second	Tony Martin (GER)	(Team Columbia–High Road)
	Third	Roman Kreuziger (CZE)	(Liquigas)
Jersey awarded to the points classification winner	Points	Fabian Cancellara (SUI)	(Team Saxo Bank)
Jersey awarded to the mountains classification winner	Mountains	Tony Martin (GER)	(Team Columbia–High Road)
Jersey awarded to the sprints classification winner	Sprints	Enrico Gasparotto (ITA)	(Lampre–NGC)
	Team	Team Saxo Bank	

The 2009 Tour de Suisse was the 73rd edition of the Tour de Suisse stage race. It took place from 13 June to 21 June and is part of both the 2009 UCI ProTour and the inaugural World Calendar. It began with a short individual time trial in Liechtenstein and ended with another time trial, in Bern. The race was won by Fabian Cancellara.

== Teams ==
As the Tour de Suisse was a UCI ProTour event, all 18 ProTour teams were invited automatically. They were joined by two Professional Continental teams, Cervélo TestTeam and Vorarlberg–Corratec, to form the event's 20-team peloton.

The 20 teams participating in the race were:

- Ag2r–La Mondiale
- Astana
- Bbox Bouygues Telecom
- Cervélo TestTeam
- Caisse d'Epargne
- Cofidis
- Euskaltel–Euskadi
- Française des Jeux
- Fuji–Servetto
- Garmin–Slipstream
- Lampre–NGC
- Liquigas
- Quick-Step
- Rabobank
- Silence–Lotto
- Team Columbia–High Road
- Team Katusha
- Team Milram
- Team Saxo Bank
- Vorarlberg–Corratec

== Route ==
Stage characteristics and winners
Stage	Date	Course	Distance	Type	Winner
1	13 June	Mauren (Liechtenstein) to Ruggell (Liechtenstein)	7.8 km (4.8 mi)	Individual time trial	Fabian Cancellara (SUI)
2	14 June	Davos to Davos	149.8 km (93.1 mi)	Medium mountain stage	Bernhard Eisel (AUT)
3	15 June	Davos to Lumino	195.4 km (121.4 mi)	Mountain stage	Mark Cavendish (GBR)
4	16 June	Biasca to Stäfa	196.6 km (122.2 mi)	Mountain stage	Matti Breschel (DEN)
5	17 June	Stäfa to Serfaus (Austria)	201.5 km (125.2 mi)	Mountain stage	Michael Albasini (SUI)
6	18 June	Oberriet to Bad Zurzach	178 km (110.6 mi)	Hilly stage	Mark Cavendish (GBR)
7	19 June	Bad Zurzach to Vallorbe Juraparc	204.1 km (126.8 mi)	Medium mountain stage	Kim Kirchen (LUX)
8	20 June	Le Sentier to Crans-Montana	181.7 km (112.9 mi)	Medium mountain stage	Tony Martin (GER)
9	21 June	Bern	38.5 km (23.9 mi)	Individual time trial	Fabian Cancellara (SUI)

== Stages ==
=== Stage 1 ===
13 June 2009 – Mauren (Liechtenstein) to Ruggell (Liechtenstein), 7.8 km (4.8 mi) (ITT)

The course for the brief individual time trial was deceptively difficult, with a categorized climb coming after 5 km and a technical descent down twisting, turning roads to the finish following it.

Two-time former world time trial champion and reigning Swiss national champion Fabian Cancellara was the winner of the opening individual time trial, taking the course 19 seconds faster than Liquigas' Roman Kreuziger. Despite the large gap Cancellara had over the man in second, most of the other times were tightly bunched, with 88 riders within a minute of Cancellara.

Stage 1 Results

	Cyclist	Team	Time
1	Fabian Cancellara (SUI)	Team Saxo Bank	9' 21"
2	Roman Kreuziger (CZE)	Liquigas	+ 19"
3	Andreas Klöden (GER)	Astana	+ 22"
4	George Hincapie (USA)	Team Columbia–High Road	+ 24"
5	Tony Martin (GER)	Team Columbia–High Road	+ 31"
6	Kim Kirchen (LUX)	Team Columbia–High Road	+ 31"
7	Maxime Monfort (BEL)	Team Columbia–High Road	+ 32"
8	Heinrich Haussler (GER)	Cervélo TestTeam	+ 34"
9	Lars Boom (NED)	Rabobank	+ 34"
10	Rui Costa (POR)	Caisse d'Epargne	+ 35"

General Classification after Stage 1

	Cyclist	Team	Time
1	Fabian Cancellara (SUI)	Team Saxo Bank	9' 21"
2	Roman Kreuziger (CZE)	Liquigas	+ 19"
3	Andreas Klöden (GER)	Astana	+ 22"
4	George Hincapie (USA)	Team Columbia–High Road	+ 24"
5	Tony Martin (GER)	Team Columbia–High Road	+ 31"
6	Kim Kirchen (LUX)	Team Columbia–High Road	+ 31"
7	Maxime Monfort (BEL)	Team Columbia–High Road	+ 32"
8	Heinrich Haussler (GER)	Cervélo TestTeam	+ 34"
9	Lars Boom (NED)	Rabobank	+ 34"
10	Rui Costa (POR)	Caisse d'Epargne	+ 35"

=== Stage 2 ===
14 June 2009 – Davos, 150 km (93 mi)

This stage began at 1400 m in elevation, descended to around 500 m, and ended back around 1500 m. After a small climb that came just after the beginning of the stage, there was a 35 km descent to the valley below and over 60 km of flat racing. At that point, the race went back uphill, with both a first- and a third-category climb coming before the finish.

The day began with a breakaway involving Javier Aramendia, Josef Benetseder, and Hervé Duclos-Lassalle, though their maximum advantage over the peloton was only 2'30". The three were caught with 25 km left to race, at which point Tony Martin launched a solo escape that got him over the first category climb before the finish in first position, giving him the lead in the mountains classification and its pink jersey. Martin was himself caught with 6 km to race as the teams of the sprinters worked to get the field together for a mass sprint finish. The sprint was so close between Bernhard Eisel, Gerald Ciolek, and Óscar Freire that even the riders themselves were unsure which of them had won. The photo finish showed Eisel to be the winner. Ninety-five riders had the same time as the stage winner, on a course that was not expected to produce a mass sprint finish.

Stage 2 Results

	Cyclist	Team	Time
1	Bernhard Eisel (AUT)	Team Columbia–High Road	3h 36' 54"
2	Gerald Ciolek (GER)	Team Milram	s.t.
3	Óscar Freire (ESP)	Rabobank	s.t.
4	Francesco Gavazzi (ITA)	Liquigas	s.t.
5	José Joaquín Rojas (ESP)	Caisse d'Epargne	s.t.
6	Xavier Florencio (ESP)	Cervélo TestTeam	s.t.
7	Andreas Dietzker (SUI)	Vorarlberg–Corratec	s.t.
8	Lloyd Mondory (FRA)	Ag2r–La Mondiale	s.t.
9	Enrico Gasparotto (ITA)	Lampre–NGC	s.t.
10	Daniel Moreno (ESP)	Caisse d'Epargne	s.t.

General Classification after Stage 2

	Cyclist	Team	Time
1	Fabian Cancellara (SUI)	Team Saxo Bank	3h 46' 12"
2	Roman Kreuziger (CZE)	Liquigas	+ 22"
3	Andreas Klöden (GER)	Astana	+ 25"
4	George Hincapie (USA)	Team Columbia–High Road	+ 27"
5	Tony Martin (GER)	Team Columbia–High Road	+ 34"
6	Kim Kirchen (LUX)	Team Columbia–High Road	+ 34"
7	Maxime Monfort (BEL)	Team Columbia–High Road	+ 35"
8	Gustav Larsson (SWE)	Team Saxo Bank	+ 36"
9	Rui Costa (POR)	Caisse d'Epargne	+ 38"
10	Bernhard Eisel (AUT)	Team Columbia–High Road	+ 39"

=== Stage 3 ===
15 June 2009 – Davos to Lumino, 195 km (121 mi)

This course was undulating for about 100 km, before the first-category climb of Lukmanier Pass at nearly 2000 m in elevation. The descent from this height took about 40 km, with another 30 km of flat racing before the finish.

The day's escapees were Will Frischkorn, Enrico Gasparotto, Samuel Dumoulin, and Marlon Pérez. Their lead was three minutes at the top of Lukmanier Pass, but with the teams of the sprinters working to get another sprint finish and Gasparotto threatening the overall race lead of Fabian Cancellara (he began the stage 48 seconds back), the peloton caught them with 3 km remaining in the stage. Ryder Hesjedal tried a solo move when the catch occurred, but he was caught with a little over 1 km to go. A bunched sprint was the finish, with Mark Cavendish winning after a successful leadout from Bernhard Eisel, Tony Martin, and George Hincapie.

Stage 3 Results

	Cyclist	Team	Time
1	Mark Cavendish (GBR)	Team Columbia–High Road	4h 39' 27"
2	Óscar Freire (ESP)	Rabobank	s.t.
3	Thor Hushovd (NOR)	Cervélo TestTeam	s.t.
4	Francesco Gavazzi (ITA)	Lampre–NGC	s.t.
5	José Joaquín Rojas (ESP)	Caisse d'Epargne	s.t.
6	Greg Van Avermaet (BEL)	Silence–Lotto	s.t.
7	Renaud Dion (FRA)	Ag2r–La Mondiale	s.t.
8	Yoann Offredo (FRA)	Française des Jeux	s.t.
9	Yauheni Hutarovich (BLR)	Française des Jeux	s.t.
10	Fabian Cancellara (SUI)	Team Saxo Bank	s.t.

General Classification after Stage 3

	Cyclist	Team	Time
1	Fabian Cancellara (SUI)	Team Saxo Bank	8h 25' 39"
2	Roman Kreuziger (CZE)	Liquigas	+ 22"
3	Andreas Klöden (GER)	Astana	+ 25"
4	George Hincapie (USA)	Team Columbia–High Road	+ 27"
5	Tony Martin (GER)	Team Columbia–High Road	+ 34"
6	Maxime Monfort (BEL)	Team Columbia–High Road	+ 35"
7	Gustav Larsson (SWE)	Team Saxo Bank	+ 36"
8	Rui Costa (POR)	Caisse d'Epargne	+ 38"
9	Óscar Freire (ESP)	Rabobank	+ 39"
10	Carlos Barredo (ESP)	Quick-Step	+ 41"

=== Stage 4 ===
16 June 2009 – Biasca to Stäfa, 197 km (122 mi)

This was a mountainous course, which is marked by the outside-categorization climb of Tremola coming almost immediately. At 2108 m, it was the highest point reached in the 2009 Tour de Suisse. There was also a second-category climb later on in the course, the descent from which left close to 40 km of flat racing prior the stage conclusion.

The stage began with a very large early breakaway, with 26 riders coming clear, representing every team except Rabobank. The best-placed man in the group was Columbia–High Road's Tony Martin, who began the day 34 seconds behind race leader Fabian Cancellara. Martin, however, was unable to make the second selection of the day, as 9 of the 26 came clear and wound up contesting the stage together, while the other 17 returned to the peloton.

Tadej Valjavec was the first to try for the stage win, attacking solo from the group of nine with 6 km remaining in the stage, but the Saxo Bank duo of Matti Breschel and Andy Schleck chased him down, uniting the group again. Thomas Rohregger was the next to try his luck, but was caught in the final 150 meters. Maxim Iglinsky looked like he was in line for the win, but Breschel came around him and pipped him at the line for the stage win. The race lead transferred to Valjavec, whose time bonus for third place on the stage outweighed the bonuses Schleck had gotten for winning the intermediate sprints. Schleck wound up in the blue jersey after the stage.

Stage 4 Results

	Cyclist	Team	Time
1	Matti Breschel (DEN)	Team Saxo Bank	3h 57' 03"
2	Maxim Iglinsky (KAZ)	Astana	s.t.
3	Tadej Valjavec (SLO)	Ag2r–La Mondiale	s.t.
4	Peter Velits (SVK)	Team Milram	s.t.
5	Oliver Zaugg (SUI)	Liquigas	s.t.
6	Andy Schleck (LUX)	Team Saxo Bank	s.t.
7	Alexander Efimkin (RUS)	Ag2r–La Mondiale	s.t.
8	Thomas Rohregger (AUT)	Team Milram	s.t.
9	Robert Kišerlovski (CRO)	Fuji–Servetto	s.t.
10	Filippo Pozzato (ITA)	Team Katusha	+ 1' 03"

General Classification after Stage 4

	Cyclist	Team	Time
1	Tadej Valjavec (SLO)	Ag2r–La Mondiale	13h 27' 57"
2	Andy Schleck (LUX)	Team Saxo Bank	+ 2"
3	Peter Velits (SVK)	Team Milram	+ 11"
4	Thomas Rohregger (AUT)	Team Milram	+ 13"
5	Oliver Zaugg (SUI)	Liquigas	+ 14"
6	Fabian Cancellara (SUI)	Team Saxo Bank	+ 20"
7	Robert Kišerlovski (CRO)	Fuji–Servetto	+ 34"
8	Roman Kreuziger (CZE)	Liquigas	+ 42"
9	Maxim Iglinskiy (KAZ)	Astana	+ 42"
10	Andreas Klöden (GER)	Astana	+ 45"

=== Stage 5 ===
17 June 2009 – Stäfa to Serfaus (Austria), 202 km (126 mi)

This was considered the queen stage of the 2009 Tour de Suisse. There were four categorized climbs on the course, two each in the first and third categories. Two of these climbs occurred within the stage's final 10 km, with only a brief false flat between the first-category climb and the third-category summit finish.

There were numerous breakaways during this stage. The first came from Pascal Hungerbühler, who was away alone for the race's first 150 km, holding a maximum advantage of eight minutes. When he was caught, another escape effort involving Marcus Burghardt and Björn Schröder took shape, but they were caught with 10 km left to race, their maximum advantage having been only 46 seconds. Rein Taaramäe and Tony Martin then tried their luck, but were caught by the yellow jersey group with 5 km remaining. The group tried repeatedly to attack and isolate race leader Tadej Valjavec, but his Ag2r team worked to keep the favorites in the same group on the road. Fifteen riders were indeed together for a sprint finish, won by Michael Albasini as he edged out countryman Fabian Cancellara at the line. The day saw a big loser in time, as Andy Schleck lost over a minute to the yellow jersey group, finishing 25th on the stage and dropping from second all the way to 13th on GC after the stage.

Stage 5 Results

	Cyclist	Team	Time
1	Michael Albasini (SUI)	Team Columbia–High Road	5h 24' 04"
2	Fabian Cancellara (SUI)	Team Saxo Bank	s.t.
3	Damiano Cunego (ITA)	Lampre–NGC	s.t.
4	Oliver Zaugg (SUI)	Liquigas	s.t.
5	Vladimir Karpets (RUS)	Team Katusha	s.t.
6	Roman Kreuziger (CZE)	Liquigas	s.t.
7	Fränk Schleck (LUX)	Team Saxo Bank	s.t.
8	Andreas Klöden (GER)	Astana	s.t.
9	Tadej Valjavec (SLO)	Ag2r–La Mondiale	s.t.
10	Maxime Monfort (BEL)	Team Columbia–High Road	s.t.

General Classification after Stage 5

	Cyclist	Team	Time
1	Tadej Valjavec (SLO)	Ag2r–La Mondiale	18h 52' 01"
2	Oliver Zaugg (SUI)	Liquigas	+ 14"
3	Fabian Cancellara (SUI)	Team Saxo Bank	+ 14"
4	Roman Kreuziger (CZE)	Liquigas	+ 42"
5	Andreas Klöden (GER)	Astana	+ 45"
6	Tony Martin (GER)	Team Columbia–High Road	+ 55"
7	Maxime Monfort (BEL)	Team Columbia–High Road	+ 55"
8	Gustav Larsson (SWE)	Team Saxo Bank	+ 56"
9	Vladimir Karpets (RUS)	Team Katusha	+ 1' 01"
10	Rein Taaramäe (EST)	Cofidis	+ 1' 02"

=== Stage 6 ===
18 June 2009 – Oberriet to Bad Zurzach, 178 km (111 mi)

This was a flat stage. After a second-category climb 10 km into the stage, the profile was very flat, with only two small third-category climbs later on. There was a perfectly flat stretch of about 8 km before the finish.

Reto Hollenstein of the continental team Vorarlberg–Corratec managed to break away after 50 km, and stayed solo until 19 km from the finish. Thor Hushovd moved to the front on the wheel of George Hincapie, but was unable to hold off Hincapie's teammate Mark Cavendish. Cavendish took his second stage win of the tour. Fabian Cancellara earned five bonus seconds in intermediate sprints to move into second place in the general classification and trail race leader Tadej Valjavec by only 9 seconds.

Stage 6 Results

	Cyclist	Team	Time
1	Mark Cavendish (GBR)	Team Columbia–High Road	4h 18' 26"
2	Óscar Freire (ESP)	Rabobank	s.t.
3	Francesco Gavazzi (ITA)	Liquigas	s.t.
4	Thor Hushovd (NOR)	Cervélo TestTeam	s.t.
5	Jürgen Roelandts (BEL)	Silence–Lotto	s.t.
6	Matti Breschel (DEN)	Team Saxo Bank	s.t.
7	Koldo Fernández (ESP)	Euskaltel–Euskadi	s.t.
8	Gerald Ciolek (GER)	Team Milram	s.t.
9	José Joaquín Rojas (ESP)	Caisse d'Epargne	s.t.
10	Wouter Weylandt (BEL)	Quick-Step	s.t.

General Classification after Stage 6

	Cyclist	Team	Time
1	Tadej Valjavec (SLO)	Ag2r–La Mondiale	23h 10' 27"
2	Fabian Cancellara (SUI)	Team Saxo Bank	+ 9"
3	Oliver Zaugg (SUI)	Liquigas	+ 14"
4	Roman Kreuziger (CZE)	Liquigas	+ 42"
5	Andreas Klöden (GER)	Astana	+ 45"
6	Tony Martin (GER)	Team Columbia–High Road	+ 54"
7	Maxime Monfort (BEL)	Team Columbia–High Road	+ 55"
8	Gustav Larsson (SWE)	Team Saxo Bank	+ 56"
9	Vladimir Karpets (RUS)	Team Katusha	+ 1' 01"
10	Rein Taaramäe (EST)	Cofidis	+ 1' 02"

=== Stage 7 ===
19 June 2009 – Bad Zurzach to Vallorbe Juraparc, 204 km (127 mi)

For 180 km, this looked like a perfect sprinters' stage, as the course didn't so much as undulate during that time. In the last 24 km, there were two categorized climbs, a third-category climb which preceded a shallow descent before a second-category summit stage finish.

After several unsuccessful breakaway efforts, José Joaquín Rojas, Marcus Burghardt, and Gerald Ciolek succeeded in their escape attempt. Damien Gaudin joined them after a lengthy solo chase, and the four were together as a group for much of the stage, gaining a maximum advantage of six minutes by the 130 km mark. The yellow jersey peloton caught them on the ascent of the third-category climb before the finish. The yellow jersey group stayed together through the first cliumb and the intermediate sprint that came right after it. On the ascend to the stage finish, beginning 3 km from the finish, Roman Kreuziger and Michael Albasini both tried to escape for the stage win, but Kreuziger was fresher, as only he was able to stay away for any length of time. He built an advantage of 17 seconds and appeared poised for the stage win. Maxime Monfort drove the yellow jersey group to a pace that allowed Kim Kirchen to attack next and catch Kreuziger in the stage's final meters for the win.

Stage 7 Results

	Cyclist	Team	Time
1	Kim Kirchen (LUX)	Team Columbia–High Road	4h 56' 41"
2	Roman Kreuziger (CZE)	Liquigas	+ 2"
3	Peter Velits (SVK)	Team Milram	+ 7"
4	Oliver Zaugg (SUI)	Liquigas	+ 7"
5	Eros Capecchi (ITA)	Fuji–Servetto	+ 7"
6	Fabian Cancellara (SUI)	Team Saxo Bank	+ 7"
7	Rui Costa (POR)	Caisse d'Epargne	+ 7"
8	Vladimir Karpets (RUS)	Team Katusha	+ 7"
9	Tony Martin (GER)	Team Columbia–High Road	+ 7"
10	Chris Anker Sørensen (DEN)	Team Saxo Bank	+ 7"

General Classification after Stage 7

	Cyclist	Team	Time
1	Tadej Valjavec (SLO)	Ag2r–La Mondiale	28h 07' 00"
2	Fabian Cancellara (SUI)	Team Saxo Bank	+ 9"
3	Oliver Zaugg (SUI)	Liquigas	+ 14"
4	Roman Kreuziger (CZE)	Liquigas	+ 31"
5	Andreas Klöden (GER)	Astana	+ 45"
6	Tony Martin (GER)	Team Columbia–High Road	+ 51"
7	Maxime Monfort (BEL)	Team Columbia–High Road	+ 55"
8	Gustav Larsson (SWE)	Team Saxo Bank	+ 56"
9	Vladimir Karpets (RUS)	Team Katusha	+ 1' 01"
10	Damiano Cunego (ITA)	Lampre–NGC	+ 1' 02"

=== Stage 8 ===
20 June 2009 – Le Sentier to Crans-Montana, 182 km (113 mi)

This stage started at 1000 m and descended to a valley at 400 m about 50 km later. For the next 90 km, the course was perfectly flat. There was then an uncategorized "wall" of about 200 m in height before a third- and a first-category climb just before the finish.

This stage saw another four-man escape group, Marcel Wyss, Pavel Brutt, Lars Boom, and Hervé Duclos-Lassalle. Their maximum advantage was five and a half minutes, after 132 km. By the beginning of the third-category climb of Botyre, their advantage was just thirty seconds. They were easily caught on that ascent. Team Saxo Bank drove the peloton, to protect Fabian Cancellara from attacks, chiefly from the Liquigas duo of Roman Kreuziger and Oliver Zaugg. In the final kilometer, mountains classification leader Tony Martin and Damiano Cunego attacked and got a small gap over the yellow jersey group, with Martin holding off Cunego in the sprint to give Team Columbia–High Road its sixth stage win in this Tour de Suisse.

Stage 8 Results

	Cyclist	Team	Time
1	Tony Martin (GER)	Team Columbia–High Road	4h 12' 31"
2	Damiano Cunego (ITA)	Lampre–NGC	s.t.
3	Fabian Cancellara (SUI)	Team Saxo Bank	+ 2"
4	Tadej Valjavec (SLO)	Ag2r–La Mondiale	+ 2"
5	Kim Kirchen (LUX)	Team Columbia–High Road	+ 2"
6	Rein Taaramäe (EST)	Cofidis	+ 2"
7	Andreas Klöden (GER)	Astana	+ 2"
8	Roman Kreuziger (CZE)	Liquigas	+ 2"
9	Vladimir Karpets (RUS)	Team Katusha	+ 2"
10	Fränk Schleck (LUX)	Team Saxo Bank	+ 2"

General Classification after Stage 8

	Cyclist	Team	Time
1	Tadej Valjavec (SLO)	Ag2r–La Mondiale	32h 19' 48"
2	Fabian Cancellara (SUI)	Team Saxo Bank	+ 4"
3	Roman Kreuziger (CZE)	Liquigas	+ 28"
4	Tony Martin (GER)	Team Columbia–High Road	+ 39"
5	Andreas Klöden (GER)	Astana	+ 45"
6	Damiano Cunego (ITA)	Lampre–NGC	+ 54"
7	Vladimir Karpets (RUS)	Team Katusha	+ 1' 01"
8	Kim Kirchen (LUX)	Team Columbia–High Road	+ 1' 07"
9	Rein Taaramäe (EST)	Cofidis	+ 1' 08"
10	Maxime Monfort (BEL)	Team Columbia–High Road	+ 1' 12"

=== Stage 9 ===
21 June 2009 – Bern, 39 km (24 mi) (ITT)

The course for the final individual time trial was gently undulating, without any categorized climbs. The finish came on a perfectly flat stretch about 3 km in length; there was a similar perfectly flat stretch about 6 km long earlier in the course.

The early time to beat was set by Silence–Lotto rider Thomas Dekker. His time held up against most of the top riders on GC, as he finished the stage third. The first man to beat him was mountains classification winner Tony Martin, winner of the previous day's stage. His ride was good enough to propel him from fourth overall onto the event's final podium, in second. The second-to-last man to take the course was the stage winner. Time trial specialist Fabian Cancellara dominated the field, with no rider finishing inside a minute of his winning time. Race leader Tadej Valjavec finished 59th on the stage, almost four minutes back of Cancellara, to drop from the race lead to seventh in the final standings. Cancellara wound up as Tour de Suisse champion by over two minutes, after trailing coming into the final day.

Stage 9 Results

	Cyclist	Team	Time
1	Fabian Cancellara (SUI)	Team Saxo Bank	45' 59"
2	Tony Martin (GER)	Team Columbia–High Road	+ 1' 27"
3	~~Thomas Dekker~~ (NED)	Silence–Lotto	+ 1' 42"
4	Marcus Burghardt (GER)	Team Columbia–High Road	+ 1' 43"
5	Sylvain Chavanel (FRA)	Quick-Step	+ 1' 48"
6	Cameron Meyer (AUS)	Garmin–Slipstream	+ 1' 50"
7	Roman Kreuziger (CZE)	Liquigas	+ 2' 00"
8	Brian Vandborg (DEN)	Liquigas	+ 2' 02"
9	Andreas Klöden (GER)	Astana	+ 2' 09"
10	Thor Hushovd (NOR)	Cervélo TestTeam	+ 2' 14"

Final General Classification

	Cyclist	Team	Time
1	Fabian Cancellara (SUI)	Team Saxo Bank	33 05' 51"
2	Tony Martin (GER)	Team Columbia–High Road	+ 2' 02"
3	Roman Kreuziger (CZE)	Liquigas	+ 2' 24"
4	Andreas Klöden (GER)	Astana	+ 2' 50"
5	Vladimir Karpets (RUS)	Team Katusha	+ 3' 18"
6	Damiano Cunego (ITA)	Lampre–NGC	+ 3' 23"
7	Tadej Valjavec (SLO)	Ag2r–La Mondiale	+ 3' 45"
8	Rein Taaramäe (EST)	Cofidis	+ 4' 04"
9	Kim Kirchen (LUX)	Team Columbia–High Road	+ 4' 04"
10	Maxime Monfort (BEL)	Team Columbia–High Road	+ 4' 08"

== Riders' jersey progress table ==
In the 2009 Tour de Suisse, four different jerseys were awarded. For the general classification, calculated by adding the finishing times of the stages per cyclist, and allowing time bonuses for the first three finishers on mass start stages, the leader received a yellow jersey. This classification is considered the most important of the Tour de Suisse, and the winner of the general classification is considered the winner of the Tour de Suisse.

Additionally, there was also a points classification, indicated with a green jersey. In the points classification, cyclists got points for finishing in the top 12 in a stage. The stage win awarded 15 points, second place awarded 12 points, third 10, and one point less per place down the line, to a single point for twelfth. In addition, some points could be won in intermediate sprints.

There was also a mountains classification, indicated with a pink jersey. In the mountains classifications, points are won by reaching the top of a mountain before other cyclists. All climbs were categorized, with most either first, second, third, or fourth-category, with more points available for the higher-categorized climbs. There was also an outside categorization climb at the beginning of Stage 4, which awarded even more points than the first-category climbs.

The fourth classification was the sprint classification. Riders earned points based on their placings in intermediate sprints (which also awarded points toward the green jersey). Points were awarded to the top three in each sprint, six for first, three for second, and one for third – same as for the green jersey. The leader of the sprint classification received a blue jersey.

There was also classification for teams. In this classification, the times of the best three cyclists per stage are added, and the team with the lowest time is leading team.

Stage	Winner	General classification	Mountains classification	Points classification	Sprints classification	Team classification
1	Fabian Cancellara	Fabian Cancellara	no award	Fabian Cancellara	no award	Team Saxo Bank
2	Bernhard Eisel	Fabian Cancellara	Tony Martin	Fabian Cancellara	Fabian Cancellara	Team Saxo Bank
3	Mark Cavendish	Fabian Cancellara	Tony Martin	Óscar Freire	Enrico Gasparotto	Team Saxo Bank
4	Matti Breschel	Tadej Valjavec	Tony Martin	Óscar Freire	Andy Schleck	Team Saxo Bank
5	Michael Albasini	Tadej Valjavec	Tony Martin	Fabian Cancellara	Enrico Gasparotto	Team Saxo Bank
6	Mark Cavendish	Tadej Valjavec	Tony Martin	Mark Cavendish	Enrico Gasparotto	Team Saxo Bank
7	Kim Kirchen	Tadej Valjavec	Tony Martin	Mark Cavendish	Enrico Gasparotto	Team Saxo Bank
8	Tony Martin	Tadej Valjavec	Tony Martin	Fabian Cancellara	Enrico Gasparotto	Team Saxo Bank
9	Fabian Cancellara	Fabian Cancellara	Tony Martin	Fabian Cancellara	Enrico Gasparotto	Team Saxo Bank
Final		Fabian Cancellara	Tony Martin	Fabian Cancellara	Enrico Gasparotto	Team Saxo Bank

Jersey wearers when one rider is leading two or more competitions

If a cyclist leads two or more competitions at the end of a stage, he receives all those jerseys. The next stage, he can only wear one jersey, and he wears the jersey representing leadership in the most important competition (yellow first, then pink, then green, then blue). The other jerseys that the cyclist holds are worn in the next stage by the second-placed rider (or, if needed, third- or fourth-placed rider) of that classification.

- After stage 1, Fabian Cancellara received the yellow jersey and the green jersey, because he was leading both the general and the points classifications. In stage 2, he wore the yellow jersey, and the green jersey was worn by the second-placed cyclist in the points classification, Roman Kreuziger.
- In stage 3, Josef Benetseder wore the blue jersey.
- In stage 3, Bernhard Eisel wore the green jersey.
