= Austrian National Time Trial Championships =

National road cycling championship in Austria

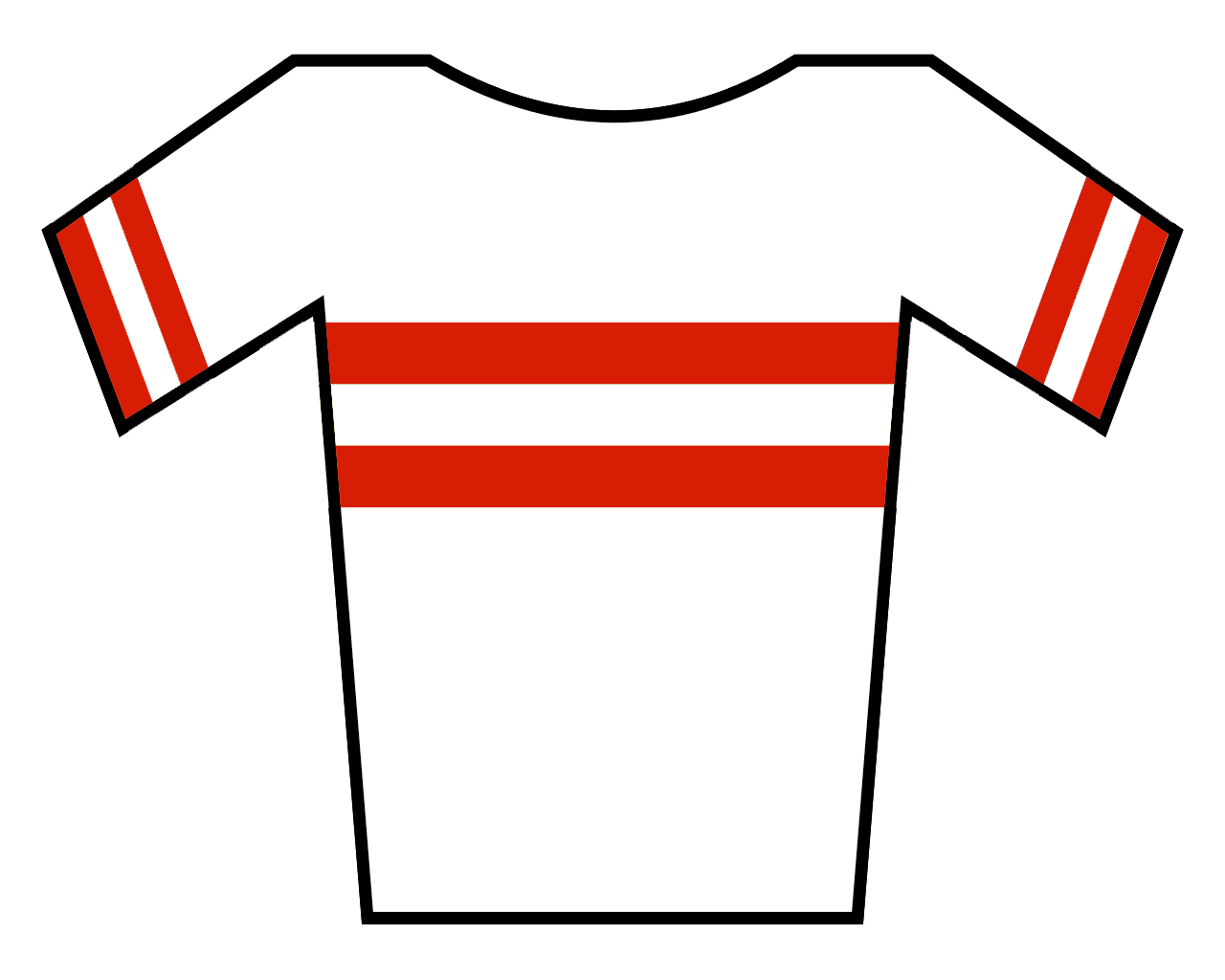
The Champion's Jersey

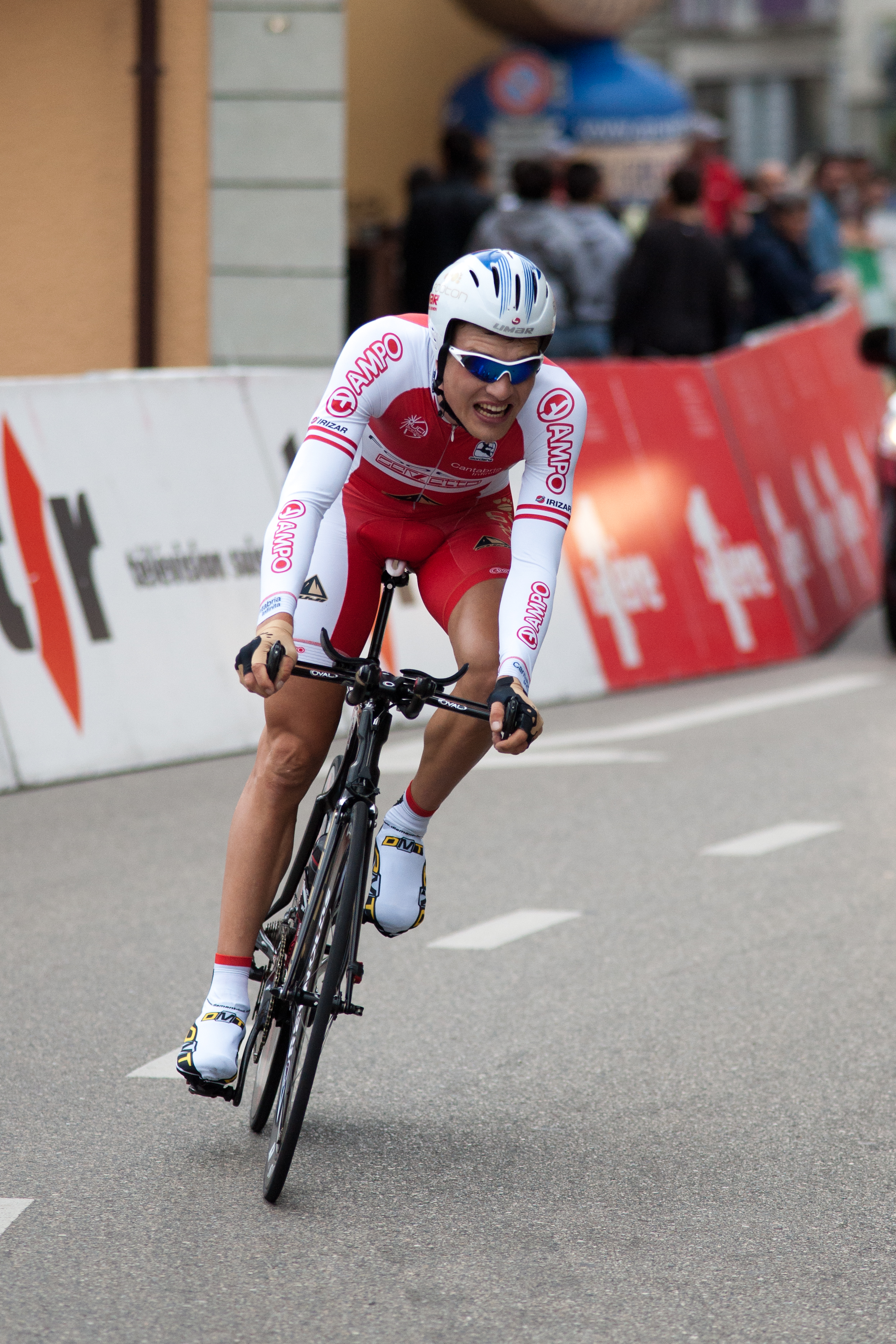
Matthias Brändle

The Austrian National Time Trial Championships are held annually as part of the Austrian National Cycling Championships, they decide the best cyclists in this discipline in Austria, across various categories.

The winners of each event are awarded with a symbolic cycling jersey which is red and white, just like the national flag, these colours can be worn by the rider at other time trialling events in the country to show their status as national champion. The champion's stripes can be combined into a sponsored rider's team kit design for this purpose.

== Multiple winners ==
Men

Wins	Name	Years
7	Matthias Brändle	2009, 2013, 2014, 2016, 2019, 2020, 2021
5	Georg Totschnig	1996, 1997, 2001, 2002, 2004
3	Georg Preidler	2015, 2017, 2018
2	Peter Luttenberger	1998, 2006
2	Felix Großschartner	2022, 2024

Women

Wins	Name	Years
7	Christiane Soeder	2004, 2005, 2006, 2007, 2009, 2010, 2012
6	Doris Posch	1995, 2000, 2001, 2002, 2003, 2011
5	Martina Ritter	2013, 2015, 2016, 2017, 2018
5	Anna Kiesenhofer	2019, 2020, 2021, 2023, 2024
2	Brigitte Krebs	1997, 1998

== Men ==
=== Elite ===
Austrian National Time Trial Championships – Men's elite race
Race details
- Region: Austria
- Discipline: Road bicycle racing
- Type: One-day

History
- First edition: 1996
- First winner: Georg Totschnig
- Most wins: Matthias Brändle (7 wins)
- Most recent: Felix Großschartner

Year	Gold	Silver	Bronze
1996	Georg Totschnig		
1997	Georg Totschnig	Bernhard Gugganig	Dietmar Müller
1998	Peter Luttenberger	Roland Garber	Florian Wiesinger
1999	Florian Wiesinger	René Haselbacher	Josef Lontscharitsch
2000	René Haselbacher	Josef Lontscharitsch	Bernhard Gugganig
2001	Georg Totschnig	Peter Luttenberger	Friedrich Berein
2002	Georg Totschnig	Hannes Hempel	Matthias Buxhofer
2003	Andrew Bradley	Martin Angerer	Martin Moser
2004	Georg Totschnig	Peter Luttenberger	Hans-Peter Obwaller
2005	Hans-Peter Obwaller	Martin Moser	Patrick Riedesser
2006	Peter Luttenberger	Thomas Rohregger	Mario Lexmüller
2007	Rupert Probst	Hans-Peter Obwaller	Christian Pfannberger
2008	Stefan Denifl	Andreas Graf	Harald Starzengruber
2009	Matthias Brändle	Andreas Graf	Michael Pichler
2010	Not held		
2011 (Note: The race was officially won by German rider Tobias Erler.)	Andreas Graf	Josef Benetseder	Riccardo Zoidl
2012	Riccardo Zoidl	Andreas Graf	Josef Benetseder
2013	Matthias Brändle	Andreas Graf	Josef Benetseder
2014	Matthias Brändle	Gregor Mühlberger	Andreas Hofer
2015	Georg Preidler	Riccardo Zoidl	Andreas Graf
2016	Matthias Brändle	Clemens Fankhauser	Riccardo Zoidl
2017	Georg Preidler	Matthias Brändle	Lukas Pöstlberger
2018	Georg Preidler	Matthias Brändle	Felix Großschartner
2019	Matthias Brändle	Johannes Hirschbichler	Patrick Konrad
2020	Matthias Brändle	Patrick Gamper	Felix Ritzinger
2021	Matthias Brändle	Felix Ritzinger	Markus Wildauer
2022	Felix Großschartner	Rainer Kepplinger	Matthias Brändle
2023	Patrick Gamper	Felix Ritzinger	Moran Vermeulen
2024	Felix Großschartner	Patrick Gamper	Adrian Stieger

=== Under 23 ===
Year	Gold	Silver	Bronze
2000	Christian Hölzl	Stefan Probst	Harald Starzengruber
2001	Christian Hölzl	Stefan Probst	Christoph Schlögl
2002	Harald Berger	Andrew Bradley	Martin Gratzer
2003	Andrew Bradley	Mario Lexmüller	Hans-Jörg Leopold
2004	Harald Berger	Andreas Graf	Josef Benetseder
2005	Markus Eibegger	Andreas Graf	Christian Lener
2006	Stefan Denifl	Markus Eibegger	Clemens Fankhauser
2007			
2008	Stefan Denifl	Matthias Brändle	Daniel Schorn
2009	Matthias Brändle	Stefan Mair	Stefan Denifl
2010	Not held		
2011	Andreas Hofer	Lukas Pöstlberger	Dominik Brändle
2012	Andreas Hofer	Lukas Pöstlberger	Patrick Konrad
2013	Andreas Hofer	Patrick Schultus	Gregor Mühlberger
2014	Gregor Mühlberger	Patrick Bosman	Alexander Wachter
2015	Gregor Mühlberger	Michael Gogl	Markus Freiberger
2016	Patrick Gamper	Patrick Bosman	Sebastian Schönberger
2017	Markus Freiberger	Patrick Gamper	Marco Friedrich
2018	Markus Wildauer	Patrick Gamper	Marco Friedrich
2019	Patrick Gamper	Markus Wildauer	Valentin Götzinger
2020	Tobias Bayer	Max Veraszto	Marco Friedrich
2021	Tobias Bayer	Valentin Götzinger	Maximilian Kabas
2022	Maximilian Kabas	Valentin Götzinger	Maximilian Schmidbauer

== Women ==
Austrian National Time Trial Championships – Women's elite race
Race details
- Region: Austria
- Discipline: Road bicycle racing
- Type: One-day

History
- First edition: 1995
- First winner: Doris Posch
- Most wins: Christiane Soeder (7 wins)
- Most recent: Anna Kiesenhofer

Year	Gold	Silver	Bronze
1995	Doris Posch	Tanja Klein	Brigitte Krebs
1996	Tanja Klein	Brigitte Krebs	Doris Posch
1997	Brigitte Krebs	Tanja Klein	Michaela Brunngraber
1998	Brigitte Krebs	Michaela Brunngraber	Doris Posch
1999	Birgit Winter	Michaela Brunngraber	Doris Posch
2000	Doris Posch	Isabella Wieser	Michaela Brunngraber
2001	Doris Posch	Andrea Purner-Koschier	Isabella Wieser
2002	Doris Posch	Brigitte Krebs	Isabella Wieser
2003	Doris Posch	Christiana Haas	Bernadette Schober
2004	Christiane Soeder	Doris Posch	Bärbel Jungmeier
2005	Christiane Soeder	Andrea Graus	Bernadette Schober
2006	Christiane Soeder	Andrea Graus	Monika Schachl
2007	Christiane Soeder	Andrea Graus	Monika Schachl
2008	Monika Schachl	Daniela Pintarelli	Jacqueline Hahn
2009	Christiane Soeder	Daniela Pintarelli	Bettina Tesar
2010	Christiane Soeder	Jacqueline Hahn	Karin Pekovits
2011	Doris Posch	Claudia Pfisterer	Karin Pekovits
2012	Christiane Soeder	Martina Ritter	Manuela Hartl
2013	Martina Ritter	Andrea Graus	Jacqueline Hahn
2014	Jacqueline Hahn	Christina Perchtold	Martina Ritter
2015	Martina Ritter	Jacqueline Hahn	Sylvia Gehnböck
2016	Martina Ritter	Anna Kiesenhofer	Manuela Hartl
2017	Martina Ritter	Manuela Hartl	Astrid Magnet
2018	Martina Ritter	Barbara Mayer	Sylvia Gehnböck
2019	Anna Kiesenhofer	Manuela Hartl	Sarah Rijkes
2020	Anna Kiesenhofer	Astrid Lamprecht	Christina Schweinberger
2021	Anna Kiesenhofer	Gabriela Thanner	Christina Schweinberger
2022	Christina Schweinberger	Anna Kiesenhofer	Gabriela Thanner
2023	Anna Kiesenhofer	Christina Schweinberger	Anna Kofler
2024	Anna Kiesenhofer	Christina Schweinberger	Tabea Huys
