= Marco Friedrich =

Austrian cyclist

Personal information
- Born: 16 February 1998 (age 28) Köflach, Austria
- Height: 1.87 m (6 ft 2 in)
- Weight: 71 kg (157 lb)

Cycling career
- Sport: Cycling
- Current team: Retired
- Discipline: Road
- Role: Rider

Professional teams
- 2017: Maloja Pushbikers
- 2018–2020: Tirol Cycling Team
- 2021–2023: Team Felbermayr–Simplon Wels

Marco Friedrich (born 16 February 1998) is an Austrian former cyclist, who competed as a professional from 2017 to 2021. He was selected to compete in the road race at the 2020 UCI Road World Championships.

After a serious accident in the Czech Republic, he ended his career.

== Major results ==
2015
3rd Time trial, National Junior Road Championships
2016
2nd Time trial, National Junior Road Championships
2017
1st Mountains classification Gemenc Grand Prix
3rd Time trial, National Under-23 Road Championships
2018
3rd Time trial, National Under-23 Road Championships
2020
3rd Time trial, National Under-23 Road Championships
