= Georg Preidler =

Austrian cyclist

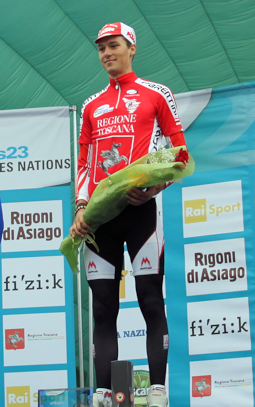
- Preidler after winning the 2011 Toscana-Terra di Ciclismo.

Personal information
- Full name: Georg Preidler
- Born: 17 June 1990 (age 36) Graz, Austria
- Height: 1.89 m (6 ft 2 1/2 in)
- Weight: 69 kg (152 lb)

Cycling career
- Sport: Cycling
- Discipline: Road
- Role: Rider
- Rider type: Climber

Professional teams
- 2010: RC Arbö–Gourmetfein–Wels
- 2011: Tyrol Team
- 2012: Team Type 1–Sanofi
- 2013–2017: Argos–Shimano
- 2018–2019: FDJ

Major wins
- One-day races and Classics National Time Trial Championships (2015, 2017)

Georg Preidler (born 17 June 1990) is an Austrian cyclist, who rode professionally between 2010 and 2019. He won the Austrian National Time Trial Championships in 2015 and 2017, and was stripped of a third title won in 2018.

In 2019, Preidler was implicated in the Operation Aderlass doping scandal, and was given a four-year suspension.

== Career ==
Preidler was born in Graz, Austria. As a junior, he won the national championship title, before Preidler began his professional career in 2010 at the Austrian Continental team RC Arbö–Gourmetfein–Wels. He rode for Team Giant–Alpecin at the 2015 Tour de France, finishing 87th overall.

== Doping ==
In February 2019, Austrian newspaper Kronen Zeitung broke news that a number of professional cyclists had been implicated in the doping scandal uncovered at the FIS Nordic World Ski Championships 2019. Preidler confessed to having his blood extracted for a possible transfusion. On 3 March, Preidler confessed to Austrian police, whilst also terminating his contract with Groupama–FDJ via email. Preidler was due to race during the previous weekend, later admitting to having his blood drawn on two occasions late in 2018. The team then contacted the Union Cycliste Internationale (UCI), the French Anti-Doping Agency (French: Agence française de lutte contre le dopage) and the Mouvement pour un cyclisme crédible (MPCC; English: Movement for Credible Cycling). Preidler was handed a four-year ban on 27 June 2019.

== Major results ==
2011
1st Overall Toscana-Terra di Ciclismo
1st Gran Premio Palio del Recioto
7th Overall Tour de l'Avenir
2012
1st Mountains classification, Tour du Haut Var
1st Mountains classification, Tour of Austria
3rd Grand Prix of Aargau Canton
7th Les Boucles du Sud Ardèche
8th Giro della Provincia di Reggio Calabria
9th Flèche d'Emeraude
2013
1st Mountains classification, Étoile de Bessèges
3rd Rund um Köln
2015
1st Time trial, National Road Championships
2017
1st Time trial, National Road Championships
1st Mountains classification, Vuelta a Andalucía

Voided results from February 2018 to March 2019.

2018
~~National Road Championships~~

~~1st Time trial~~
~~3rd Road race~~

~~6th Overall Tour de Pologne~~

~~1st Stage 6~~

~~7th Raiffeisen Grand Prix~~
~~10th Overall Route d'Occitanie~~

=== Grand Tour general classification results timeline ===
Grand Tour	2013	2014	2015	2016	2017	2018
Giro d'Italia	—	27	—	26	71	~~29~~
Tour de France	—	—	87	56	—	—
Vuelta a España	36	—	—	—	—	~~DNF~~

Legend
—	Did not compete
DNF	Did not finish
~~No.~~	Disqualified result
