= Monika Schachl =

Austrian cyclist

Personal information
- Full name: Monika Schachl
- Born: 21 August 1978 (age 48) Mondsee, Vöcklabruck, Austria
- Height: 1.65 m (5 ft 5 in)
- Weight: 57 kg (126 lb)

Cycling career
- Sport: Cycling
- Current team: Retired
- Disciplines: Road, mountain biking
- Role: Rider, time-trialist, cross-country biker

Professional teams
- 2004: RC ELK Haus Tirol
- 2005: Elk Haus–Simplon
- 2007: Team Uniqa Graz
- 2008: Uniqa
- 2009: Uniqa – Elk

Major wins
- Austrian Championships (Road) (2008); Austrian Championships (ITT) (2008)

Monika Schachl (born 21 August 1978 in Mondsee) is a retired Austrian professional road cyclist and mountain biker. She represented her nation Austria at the 2008 Summer Olympics, and later captured three Austrian championship titles each in mountain biking, road race, and time trial during the 2005 and 2008 seasons. Before her official retirement in 2009, Schachl rode for Team Uniqa Graz in the women's elite professional events on the UCI Women's World Cup, UCI World Championships, and Austrian Championships.

Schachl qualified for the Austrian squad in the women's road race at the 2008 Summer Olympics by receiving one of the nation's two available berths from the UCI World Cup. She successfully completed a grueling race with a forty-sixth-place effort in 3:36:37, trailing behind Belgium's Lieselot Decroix and Mexico's Alessandra Grassi by a scanty, two-second gap.

== Career highlights ==
2005
1st Austrian Mountain Bike Championships
2006
1st Stage 5, Krasna Lipa Tour Féminine, Krásná Lípa (CZE)
3rd Austrian Championships (Road)
3rd Austrian Championships (ITT)
2007
1st Overall, Rad-Tage Salzkammergut, Salzkammergut (AUT)
1st Stage 5, Krasna Lipa Tour Féminine, Krásná Lípa (CZE)
2nd Overall, Wiener Radfest, Vienna (AUT)
3rd Austrian Championships (Road), Podersdorf am See (AUT)
2008
1st Overall, Wiener Radfest, Vienna (AUT)
1st Austrian Championships (Road)
1st Austrian Championships (ITT), Seefeld in Tirol (AUT)
46th Olympic Games (Road), Beijing (CHN)
