= Tobias Bayer =

Austrian cyclist

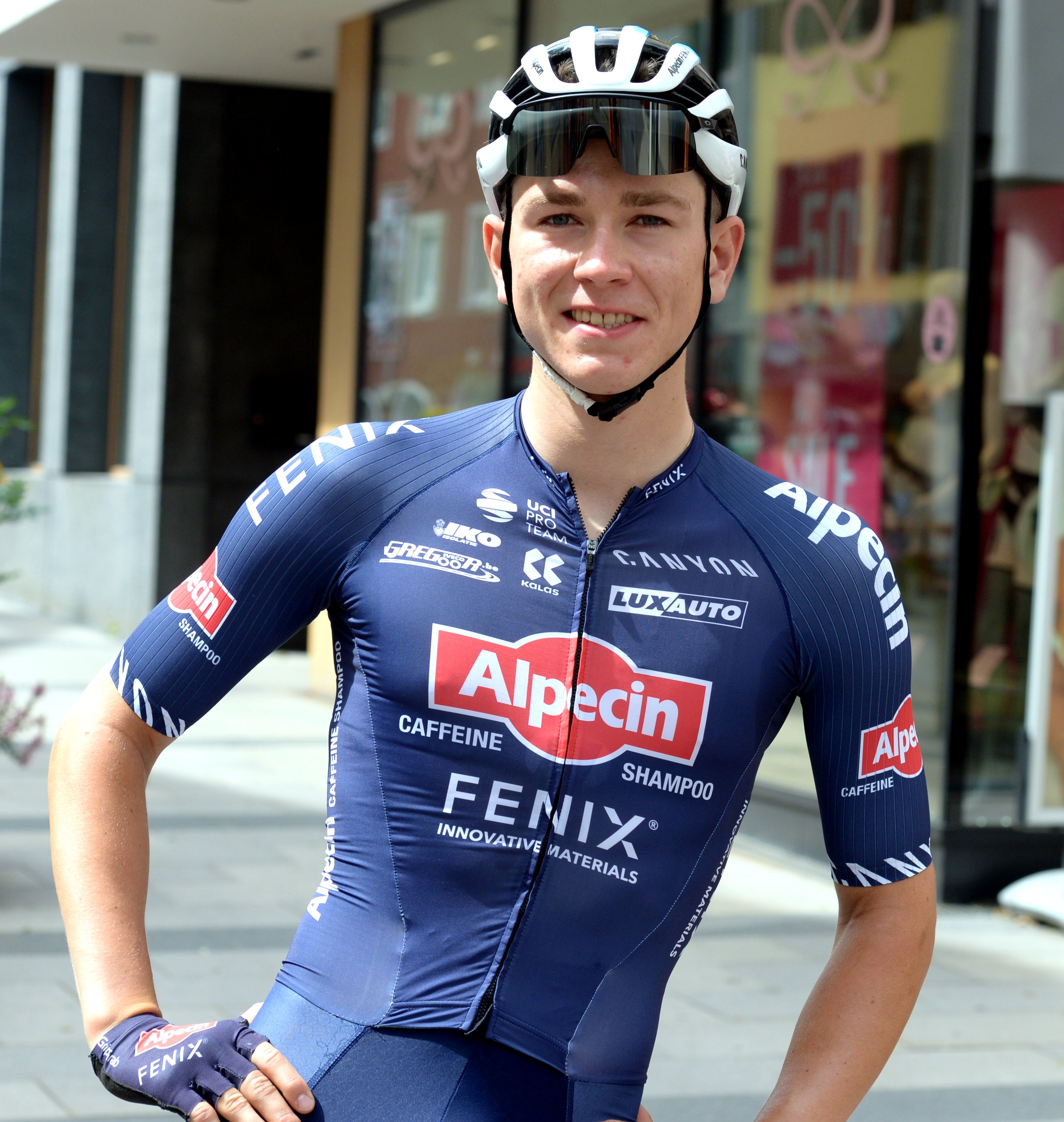
- Bayer in 2021

Personal information
- Full name: Tobias Bayer
- Born: 17 November 1999 (age 26) Straß im Attergau, Austria
- Height: 1.84 m (6 ft 0 in)
- Weight: 71 kg (157 lb)

Cycling career
- Sport: Cycling
- Current team: Alpecin–Premier Tech
- Disciplines: Road, Cyclocross
- Role: Rider

Professional teams
- 2018–2020: Tirol Cycling Team
- 2021–: Alpecin–Fenix

Tobias Bayer (born 17 November 1999) is an Austrian racing cyclist, who currently rides for UCI WorldTeam Alpecin–Premier Tech.

== Career ==
Bayer began his cycling career in 2015, participating in the Race Around Austria team challenge as one of his first races. In 2017, he won the Austrian junior titles in both cyclocross and the individual time trial. His father was also a cyclist and participated in the first Mountain Bike World Championships in Colorado in 1990.

In June 2019, Bayer delivered a noteworthy performance at the Austrian National Road Race Championships near Mondsee, finishing fifth overall and winning the under-23 title ahead of several World Tour professionals.

Bayer rode his first Grand Tour, Vuelta a España in 2021 and supported his captain and sprinter Jasper Philipsen in two stage victories. In 2021 he became Austrian national champion in the under-23 category in both the road race and time trial. He rode for Tirol Cycling Team in the men's team time trial event at the 2018 UCI Road World Championships.

From 2018 to 2021, Bayer was an active athlete in the sports division of the Austrian Armed Forces. In 2020, as a soldier-sportsman, he held the rank of Gefreiter (Private). During the 2020 Giro Ciclistico d'Italia, he finished third on the third stage and briefly led the mountains classification.

For the 2027 season, Bayer changed teams, signing a two-year contract for 2027 and 2028 with the American WorldTour team EF Education. The team is run by cycling executive and former professional rider Jonathan Vaughters.

== Major results ==
=== Cyclo-cross ===
2016–2017
1st National Junior Championships

=== Road ===
2017
1st Time trial, National Junior hampionships
2nd Internationale Cottbuser Junioren-Etappenfahrt
3rd Tour de Haute-Autriche Juniors
7th Road race, UEC European Junior Championships
2018
1st Overall U23 Bundesliga Austria
2019
1st Road race, National Under-23 Championships
5th Road race, National Championships
9th Croatia–Slovenia
10th Overall Giro del Friuli-Venezia Giulia
2020
1st Time trial, National Under-23 Championships
7th Overall Giro della Friuli Venezia Giulia
2021
National Under-23 Championships

1st Road race
1st Time trial

National Championships

2nd Time trial,
4th Road race

9th Overall Boucles de la Mayenne
10th Road race, UCI World Under-23 Championships
10th Road race, UEC European Under-23 Championships
2022
3rd Brussels Cycling Classic
5th Time trial, National Championships
2024
7th Volta NXT Classic
2025
3rd Road race, National Championships

==== Grand Tour general classification results timeline ====
Grand Tour	2021	2022	2023	2024	2025	2026
Giro d'Italia	—	100	—	96	—	80
Tour de France	—	—	—	—	—	
Vuelta a España	DNF	—	141	—	132	

Legend
—	Did not compete
DNF	Did not finish
IP	Race in Progress
