= Josef Benetseder =

Austrian cyclist

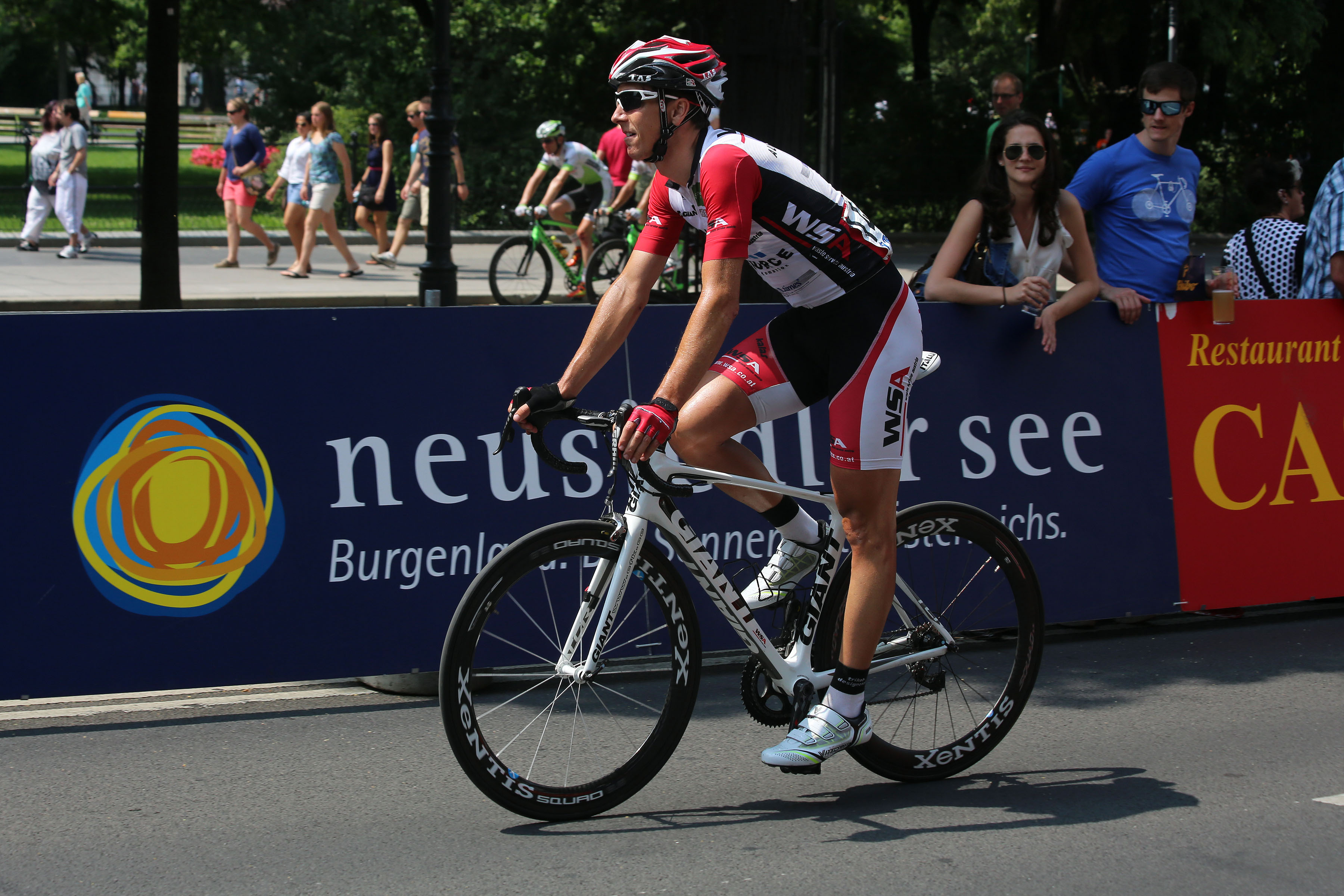
- Benetseder in 2013.

Personal information
- Full name: Josef Benetseder
- Born: 10 February 1983 (age 43) Ried im Innkreis, Austria

Cycling career
- Sport: Cycling
- Current team: Hrinkow Advarics
- Discipline: Road
- Role: Rider (retired); Directeur sportif

Professional teams
- 2006–2012: Vorarlberger
- 2013: WSA
- 2014: Tirol Cycling Team
- 2015–2016: Hrinkow Advarics Cycleangteam

Managerial team
- 2017–: Hrinkow Advarics Cycleang

Josef Benetseder (born 10 February 1983 in Ried im Innkreis) is an Austrian former professional cyclist, who currently works as a directeur sportif for UCI Continental team Hrinkow Advarics.

== Major results ==
2003
3rd Road race, National Under-23 Road Championships
2004
National Under-23 Road Championships

3rd Road race
3rd Time trial

2008
3rd Raiffeisen Grand Prix
8th Giro di Romagna
2010
1st Stage 2 Oberösterreichrundfahrt
2nd Croatia–Slovenia
2011
3rd Time trial, National Road Championships
9th Overall Oberösterreichrundfahrt
9th Croatia–Slovenia
2012
1st National Hill Climb Championships
2nd Road race, National Road Championships
6th Grand Prix Südkärnten
2013
1st Tour Bohemia
5th Banja Luka–Belgrade II
10th Overall Okolo Jižních Čech
