= Lukas Pöstlberger =

Austrian cyclist (born 1992)

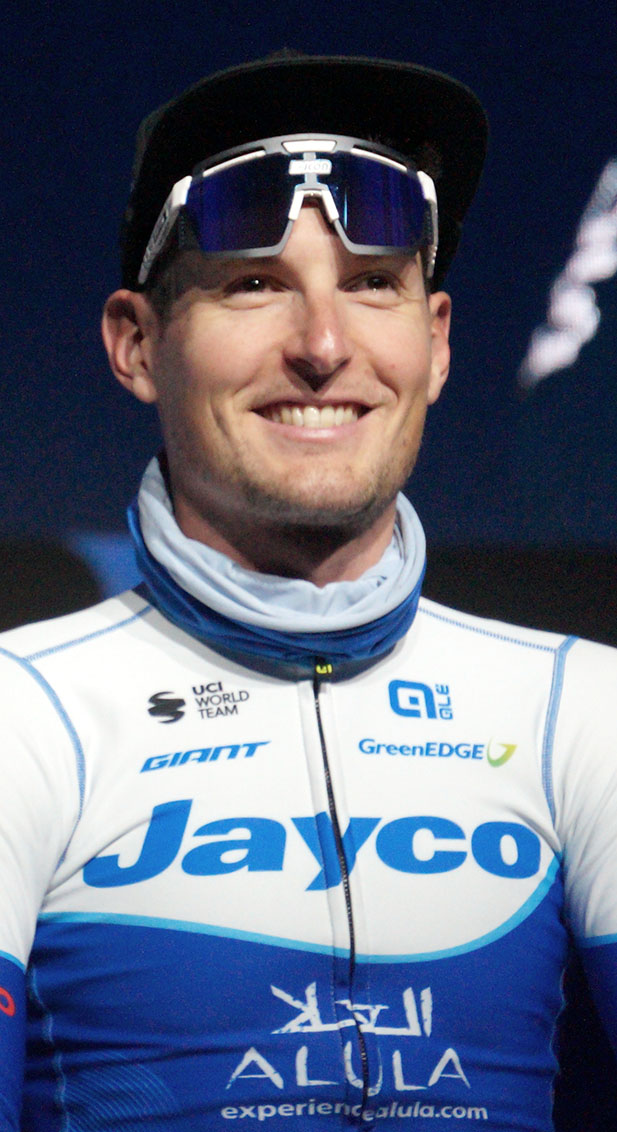
- Pöstlberger in 2023

Personal information
- Nickname: Pösti
- Born: 10 January 1992 (age 34) Vöcklabruck, Upper Austria, Austria
- Height: 1.82 m (5 ft 11 1/2 in)
- Weight: 70 kg (154 lb; 11 st 0 lb)

Cycling career
- Sport: Cycling
- Discipline: Road
- Role: Rider
- Rider type: Rouleur

Amateur team
- 2015: Bora–Argon 18 (stagiaire)

Professional teams
- 2011–2013: RC Arbö–Gourmetfein–Wels
- 2014–2015: Tirol Cycling Team
- 2016–2022: Bora–Argon 18
- 2023: Team Jayco–AlUla

Major wins
- Grand Tours Giro d'Italia 1 individual stage (2017) One-day races and Classics National Road Race Championships (2012, 2018)

Lukas Pöstlberger (born 10 January 1992) is an Austrian cyclist, who most recently rode for UCI WorldTeam Team Jayco–AlUla. He won the Austrian National Road Race Championships in 2012.

== Career ==
Born in Vöcklabruck, Pöstlberger was named in the start list for the 2017 Giro d'Italia and won the opening stage, becoming the first Austrian rider to win a stage of the Giro and the first Austrian to lead the race. In July 2018, he was named in the start list for the 2018 Tour de France.

== Major results ==
2011
1st Stage 1 (TTT) Sibiu Cycling Tour
5th Time trial, National Road Championships
2012
National Road Championships

1st Road race
4th Time trial

1st Stage 3 Tour de l'Avenir
2013
1st GP Kranj
5th Road race, National Road Championships
5th Overall Tour of Al Zubarah
6th Overall Sibiu Cycling Tour

1st Young rider classification

9th Road race, UEC European Under-23 Road Championships
9th Gran Premio San Giuseppe
2014
1st Tour Bohemia
2015
1st Overall An Post Rás
1st Stage 7 Tour of Austria
1st Mountains classification, Oberösterreich Rundfahrt
2nd Belgrade Banjaluka II
3rd Trofeo Edil C
4th Time trial, National Road Championships
10th Overall Istrian Spring Trophy

1st Prologue

Combativity award Overall Tour Alsace
2016
1st Stage 4 Oberösterreich Rundfahrt
10th Druivenkoers Overijse
2017
Giro d'Italia

1st Stage 1
Held & after Stage 1
Held after Stages 1–2

National Road Championships

2nd Road race
3rd Time trial

5th E3 Harelbeke
2018
National Road Championships

1st Road race
4th Time trial

2019
4th Dwars door Vlaanderen
8th Overall Okolo Slovenska
2021
1st Stage 2 Critérium du Dauphiné
2022
3rd Road race, National Road Championships
2023
1st Hong Kong Challenge
3rd Road race, National Road Championships
10th Clàssica Comunitat Valenciana 1969

=== Grand Tour general classification results timeline ===
Grand Tour	2017	2018	2019	2020	2021	2022	2023
Giro d'Italia	114	—	—	—	—	—	95
Tour de France	—	132	DNF	DNF	116	—	
Vuelta a España	—	DNF	—	—	—	—	

Legend
—	Did not compete
DNF	Did not finish
