= Matthias Brändle =

Austrian racing cyclist

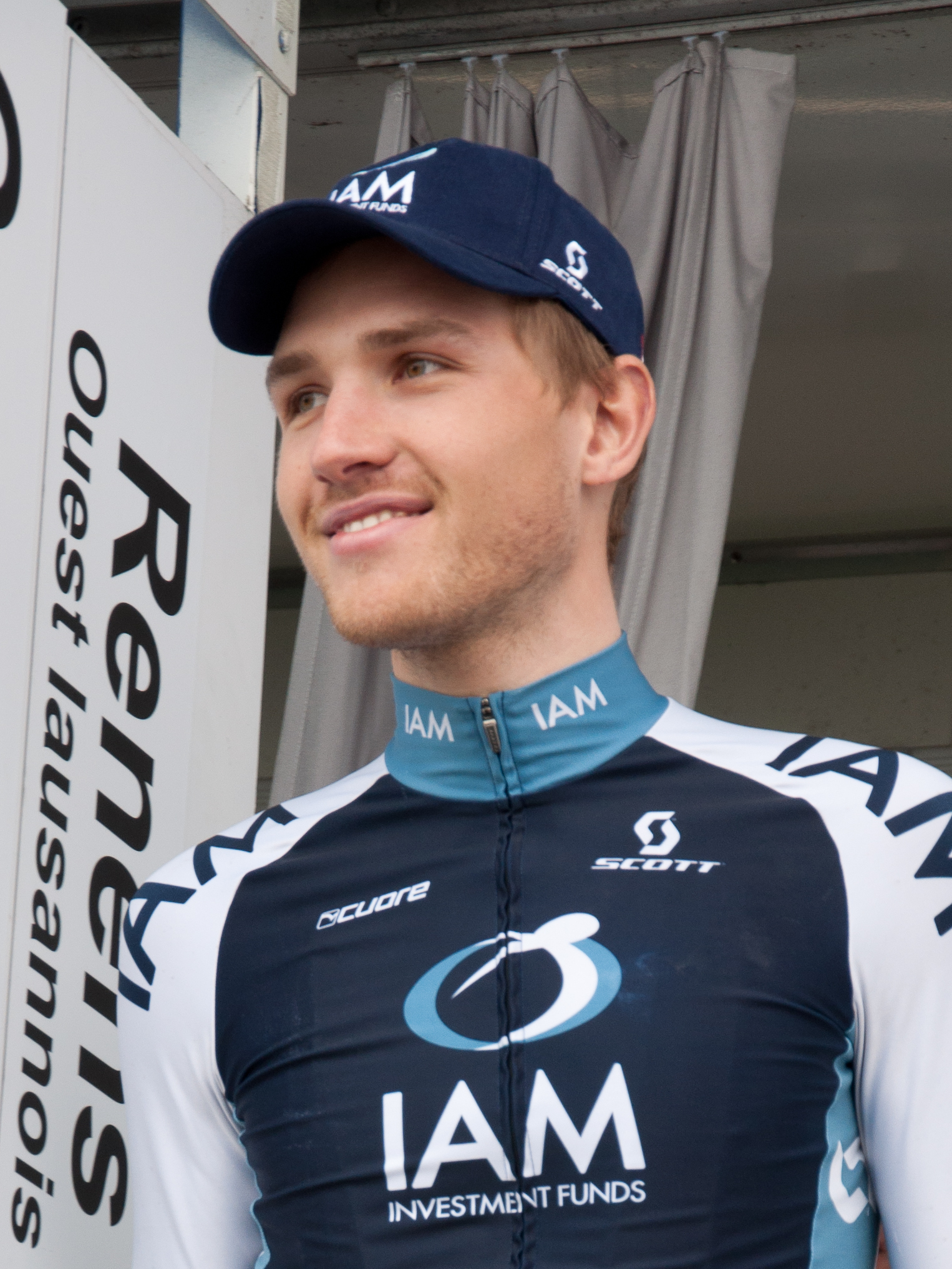
- Brändle at the 2013 Tour de Romandie

Personal information
- Full name: Matthias Brändle
- Born: 7 December 1989 (age 36) Hohenems, Vorarlberg, Austria
- Height: 1.89 m (6 ft 2 in)
- Weight: 77 kg (170 lb)

Cycling career
- Sport: Cycling
- Discipline: Road
- Role: Rider
- Rider type: Time-trialist

Professional teams
- 2008: Team Ista
- 2009: Elk Haus
- 2010–2011: Footon–Servetto–Fuji
- 2012: Team NetApp
- 2013–2016: IAM Cycling
- 2017–2018: Trek–Segafredo
- 2019–2022: Israel Cycling Academy

Major wins
- One-day races and Classics National Road Race Championships (2016) National Time Trial Championships (2009, 2013, 2014, 2016, 2019–2021) World Hour record 30 October 2014, 51.852 km

Matthias Brändle (born 7 December 1989) is an Austrian professional road bicycle racer. Brändle is a seven-time winner of the Austrian National Time Trial Championships (2009, 2013, 2014, 2016, 2019, 2020 and 2021), and also won the Austrian National Road Race Championships in 2016.

== Career ==
In 2012, he rode for Team NetApp. In 2014, Brändle won two consecutive stages of the Tour of Britain.

In October 2014, he followed in the footsteps of his agent Tony Rominger by setting a new hour record, breaking the month-old record set by 43-year-old Jens Voigt under new regulations introduced by the UCI in June 2014 allowing the use of modern track pursuit racing bicycles. The record stood until 8 February 2015 when it was broken by Australian rider Rohan Dennis.

He was named in the start list for the 2015 Tour de France. He won the Austrian National Road Race Championships in 2016.

== Major results ==
2007
1st Overall Trofeo Karlsberg

1st Stage 1

1st Overall Tour de Haute-Autriche

1st Stages 2 & 3

2008
2nd Time trial, National Under-23 Road Championships
2nd Overall Tour de Berlin
3rd Züri-Metzgete
4th Chrono Champenois
7th Overall Grand Prix Guillaume Tell
9th Overall Cinturón a Mallorca
10th Overall Thüringen Rundfahrt der U23
2009 (1 pro win)
National Road Championships

1st Time trial
1st Under-23 time trial

3rd Eschborn–Frankfurt City Loop U23
5th Overall Tour of Hainan
5th Overall Thüringen Rundfahrt der U23
5th Rund um Köln
9th Road race, UCI Road World Under-23 Championships
2010
1st GP Judendorf–Strassengel
8th Overall Tour de Langkawi
2011
1st Sprints classification, Tour de Romandie
2012 (1)
1st Grote Prijs Stad Zottegem
1st Stage 2b (TTT) Settimana Internazionale di Coppi e Bartali
5th Giro dell'Appennino
9th Rund um Köln
2013 (1)
1st Time trial, National Road Championships
1st Sprints classification, Tour de Romandie
1st Mountains classification, Tour de l'Ain
1st Tour du Jura
2nd Polynormande
4th Overall Tour de Luxembourg

1st Young rider classification

4th Cholet-Pays de Loire
4th Tour de Berne
2014 (3)
Hour record: 51.852 km
National Road Championships

1st Time trial
4th Road race

1st Tour de Berne
Tour of Britain

1st Stages 5 & 6

5th Overall Tour of Belgium
10th Overall Tour du Poitou-Charentes
2015 (2)
1st Stage 6 Tour of Oman
1st Prologue Tour of Belgium
4th Overall Tour de l'Eurométropole
2016 (2)
National Road Championships

1st Road race
1st Time trial

2017 (2)
1st Stage 3 (ITT) Tour of Belgium
1st Stage 4 (ITT) Danmark Rundt
2nd Time trial, National Road Championships
2nd Overall Three Days of De Panne
4th Time trial, UEC European Road Championships
2018
2nd Time trial, National Road Championships
2019 (3)
1st Time trial, National Road Championships
2nd Overall Tour of Estonia

1st Prologue

3rd Overall Tour of Taihu Lake

1st Prologue

3rd Duo Normand (with Patrick Gamper)
7th Overall Okolo Slovenska
8th Overall Tour Poitou-Charentes en Nouvelle-Aquitaine
2020 (1)
1st Time trial, National Road Championships
2021 (1)
1st Time trial, National Road Championships
1st Stage 1b (TTT) Settimana Internazionale di Coppi e Bartali
2022
3rd Time trial, National Road Championships

=== Grand Tour general classification results timeline ===
Grand Tour	2010	2011	2012	2013	2014	2015	2016	2017	2018	2019	2020	2021	2022
Giro d'Italia	90	—	111	—	—	—	DNF	—	—	—	126	130	147
Tour de France	—	—	—	—	—	156	—	—	—	—	—	—	—
Vuelta a España	—	155	—	—	—	—	—	—	158	—	—	—	—

Legend
—	Did not compete
DNF	Did not finish

Records
Preceded by Jens Voigt	UCI hour record (51.852 km); 30 October 2014 – 8 February 2015	Succeeded by Rohan Dennis
