= Markus Wildauer =

Austrian cyclist

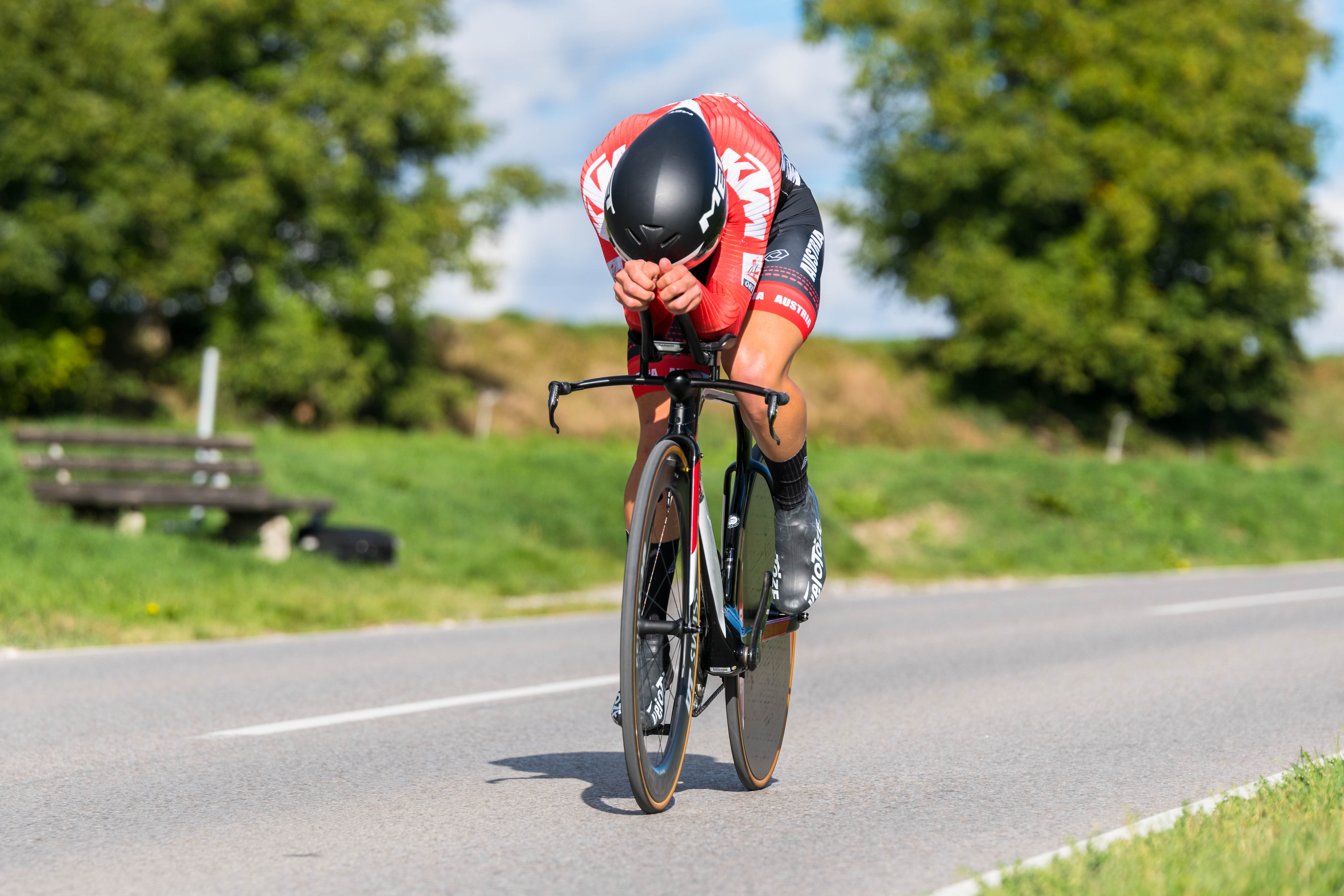
- Wildauer at the 2018 UCI Road World Championships

Personal information
- Full name: Markus Wildauer
- Born: 25 May 1998 (age 28) Schlitters, Austria

Cycling career
- Sport: Cycling
- Current team: Team Vorarlberg
- Discipline: Road
- Role: Rider

Professional teams
- 2017–2020: Tirol Cycling Team
- 2021–: Team Vorarlberg

Markus Wildauer (born 25 May 1998) is an Austrian cyclist, who currently rides for UCI Continental team Team Vorarlberg. He was selected to compete in the road race at the 2020 UCI Road World Championships.

== Major results ==
2016
1st Time trial, National Junior Road Championships
4th Overall Trofeo Karlsberg
2018
1st Time trial, National Under-23 Road Championships
1st Stage 2 Giro Ciclistico d'Italia
3rd Time trial, UEC European Under-23 Road Championships
4th Overall Gemenc Grand Prix

1st Young rider classification

2019
2nd Time trial, National Under-23 Road Championships
4th Gran Premio Industrie del Marmo
9th Time trial, UCI Under-23 Road World Championships
2021
10th Gran Premio di Lugano
