= Maximilian Schmidbauer =

Austrian cyclist (born 2001)

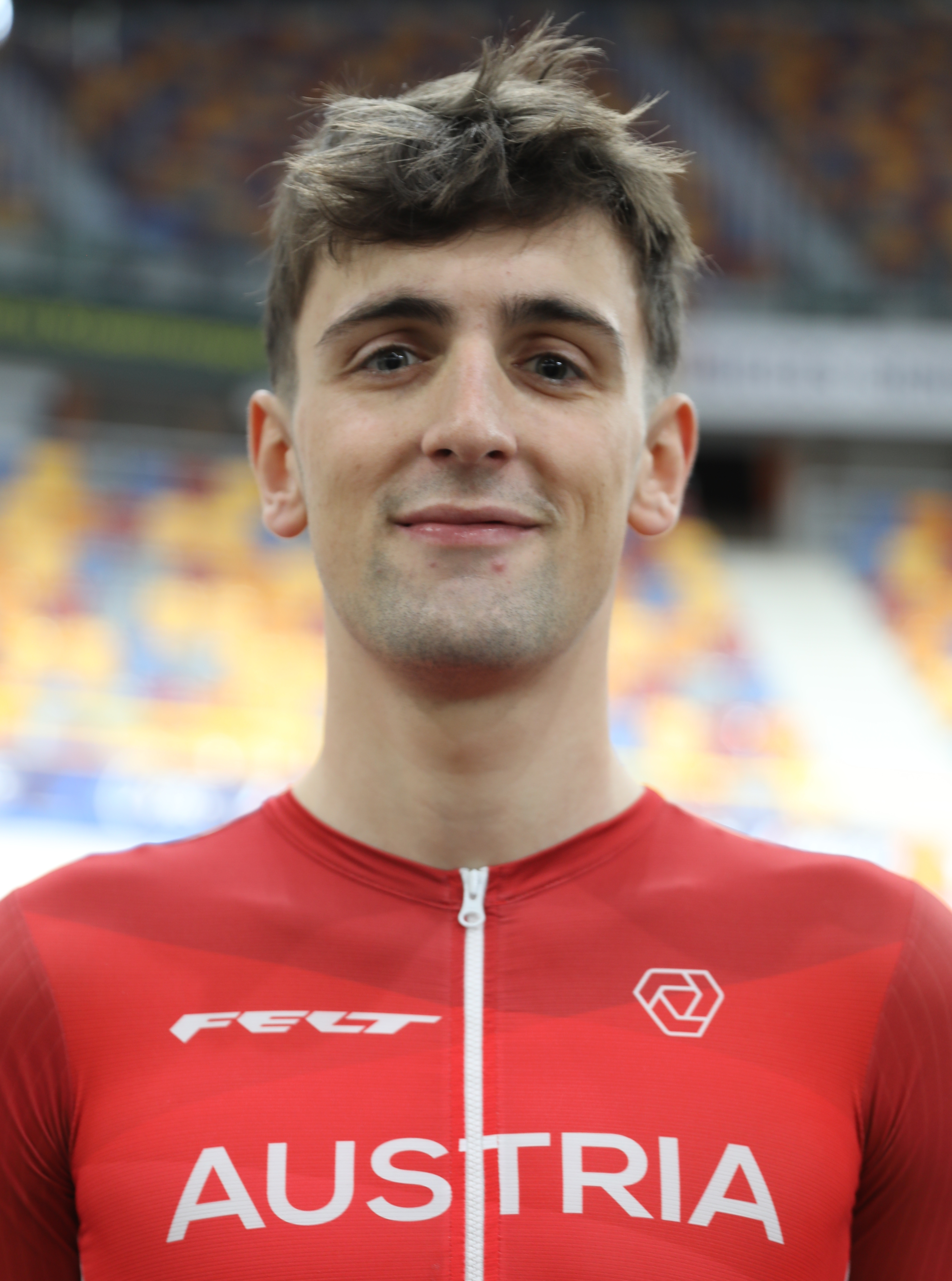
- Schmidbauer in 2024

Personal information
- Born: 23 December 2001 (age 24) Vienna, Austria
- Height: 1.87 m (6 ft 2 in)
- Weight: 80 kg (176 lb)

Cycling career
- Sport: Cycling
- Current team: WSA KTM Graz
- Disciplines: Road; Track
- Role: Rider

Professional team
- 2020–: WSA KTM Graz

Maximilian Schmidbauer (born 23 December 2001) is an Austrian cyclist, who currently rides for UCI Continental team WSA KTM Graz. He competed in the scratch race at the 2021 UCI Track Cycling World Championships and in the mixed team relay at the 2021 UCI Road World Championships.

== Major results ==
=== Road ===
2018
3rd Road race, National Junior Road Championships
2019
2nd Overall Olympic Hopes - Belgrade Trophy Milan Panić

1st Stage 2

3rd Time trial, National Junior Road Championships
2021
4th Time trial, National Under-23 Road Championships

=== Track ===
2021
National Championships

2nd Omnium
2nd Kilometer
2nd Pursuit
2nd Scratch
3rd Points race

2022
1st Points race, UEC European Under-23 Track Championships
