= Jacqueline Hahn =

Austrian cyclist (born 1991)

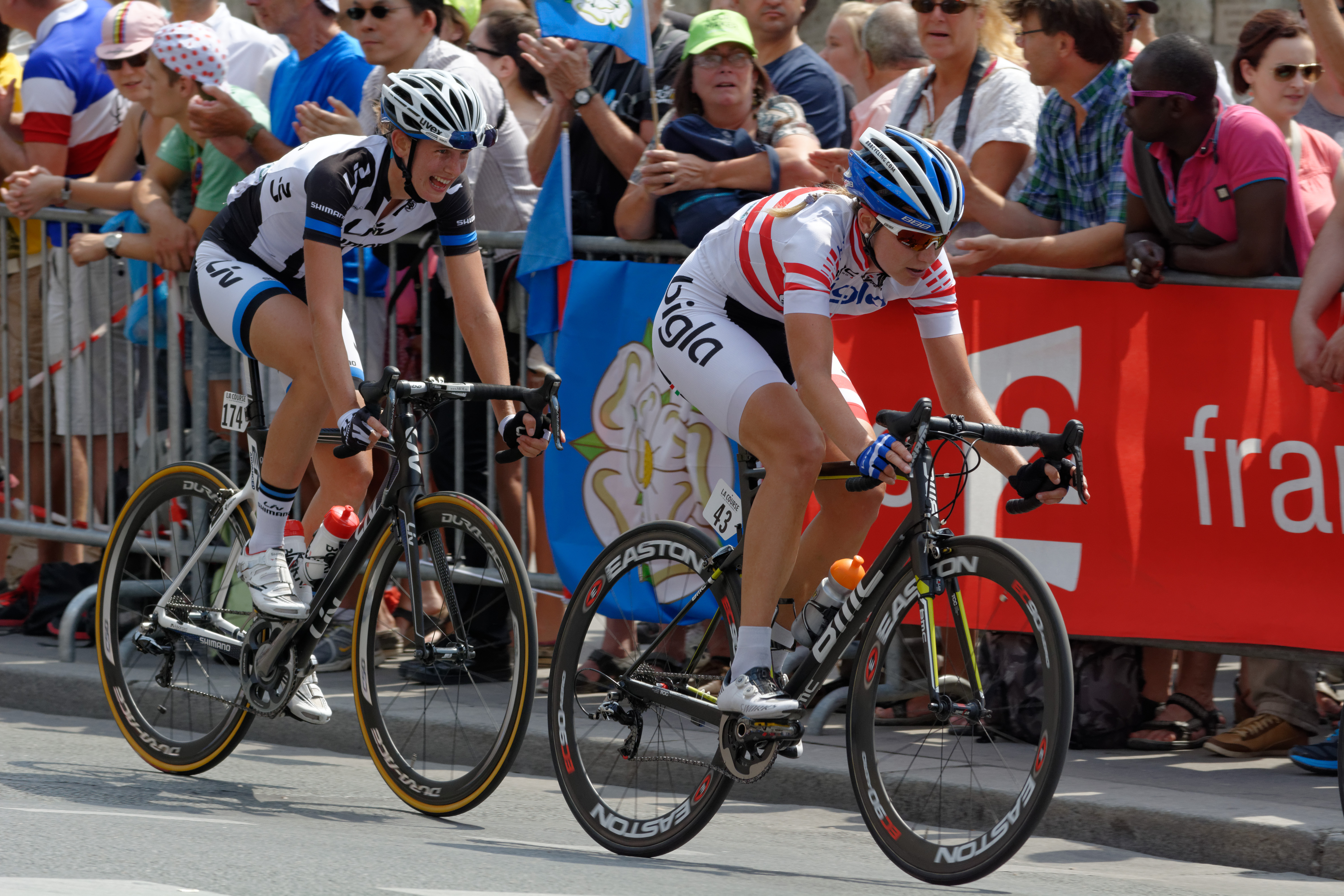
- Hahn (right) at the 2014 La Course by Le Tour de France

Personal information
- Born: 21 July 1991 (age 35) Innsbruck, Austria

Cycling career
- Sport: Cycling
- Current team: Retired
- Disciplines: Road; Cyclo-cross
- Role: Rider

Professional teams
- 2010: Hitec Products UCK
- 2011–2012: Kuota Speed Kueens
- 2014: Bigla Cycling Team
- 2015: Feminine Cycling Team

Major wins
- One day races National Criterium Championships (2009, 2013) National Cyclo-cross Championships (2012) National Road Race Championships (2014)

Jacqueline Hahn (born 21 July 1991) is an Austrian former racing cyclist. She competed in the 2013 UCI women's time trial in Florence. Hahn won national titles in the road race, criterium and cyclo-cross during her career.

== Major results ==
2007
1st Schwazer Raiffeisen
2008
National Road Championships

1st Junior time trial
3rd Road race

2nd Time trial, UEC European Junior Road Championships
2009
National Road Championships

1st Criterium
1st Junior time trial
3rd Road race

1st Tour de Berne (junior)
2010
National Road Championships

1st Under-23 road race
3rd Road race

2011
1st Time trial, National Under-23 Road Championships
1st Langenlois Road Race
1st Langenlois Criterium
9th Overall Gracia–Orlová
2012
1st Elite race, National Cyclo-cross Championships
National Road Championships

1st Under-23 time trial
3rd Time trial

9th Memorial Davide Fardelli
2013
National Road Championships

1st Criterium
1st Under-23 time trial

7th Time trial, UEC European Junior Road Championships
2014
National Road Championships

1st Road race
2nd Time trial

1st GP Osterhas
2015
2nd Time trial, National Road Championships
