= Doris Posch =

Austrian cyclist

Personal information
- Born: 1 April 1973 (age 53) Umhausen, Austria

Cycling career
- Sport: Cycling
- Disciplines: Road cycling, Track cycling
- Role: Rider
- Rider type: Time trialist

Professional team
- 1999: Radclub Tirol

Doris Posch (born 1 April 1973) is a track and road cyclist from Austria. She represented her nation at the 2001 and 2002 UCI Road World Championships. She has won the Austrian National Time Trial Championships six times.
