= Patrick Gamper =

Austrian cyclist

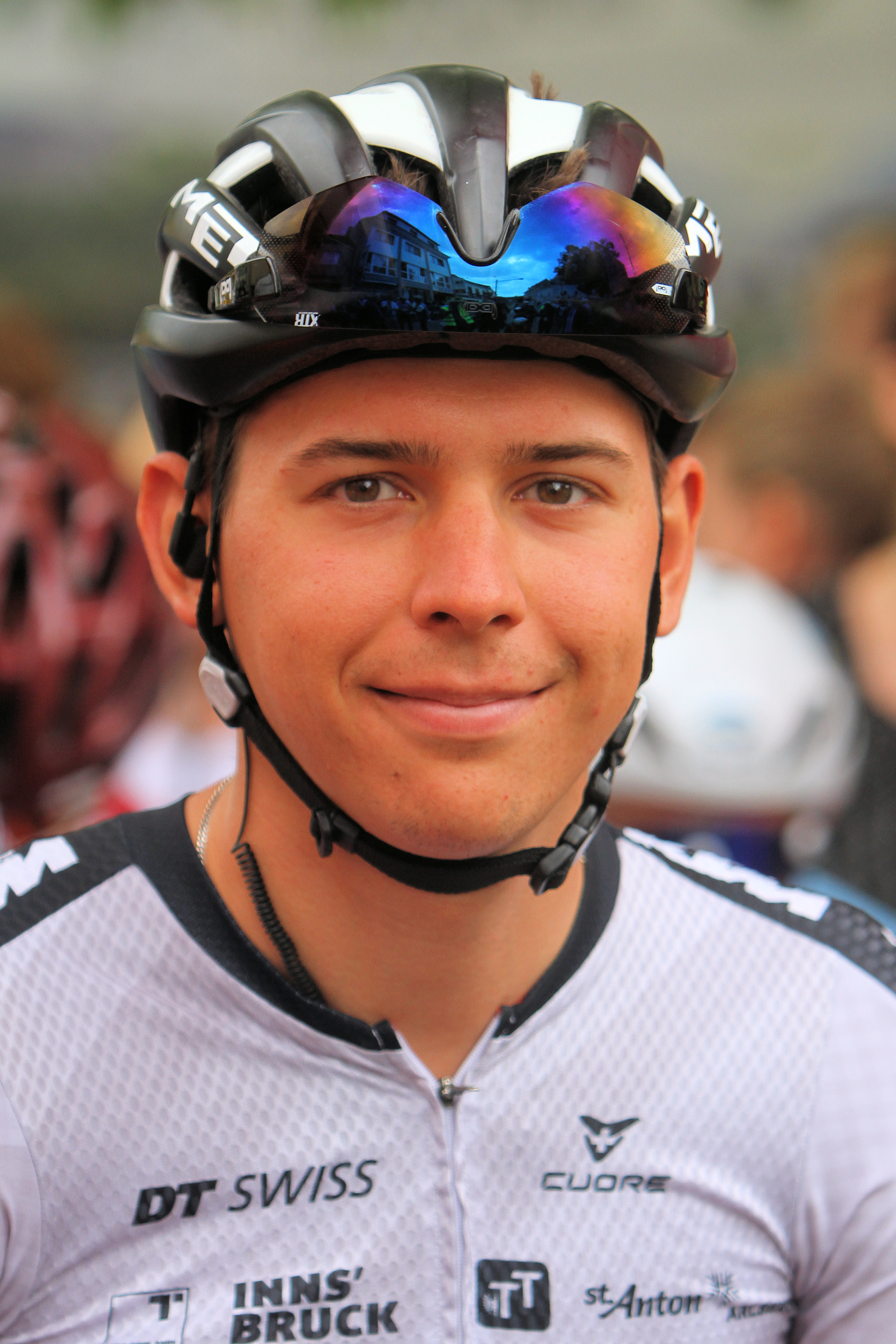
- Gamper in 2019

Personal information
- Full name: Patrick Gamper
- Born: 18 February 1997 (age 29) Münster, Austria
- Height: 1.94 m (6 ft 4 in)
- Weight: 80 kg (176 lb)

Cycling career
- Sport: Cycling
- Current team: Team Jayco–AlUla
- Discipline: Road
- Role: Rider

Professional teams
- 2016–2017: Tirol Cycling Team
- 2018: Polartec–Kometa
- 2019: Tirol KTM Cycling Team
- 2020–2024: Bora–Hansgrohe
- 2025–: Team Jayco–AlUla

Major wins
- One-day races and Classics National Time Trial Championships (2023)

Patrick Gamper (born 18 February 1997) is an Austrian cyclist, who currently rides for UCI WorldTeam Team Jayco–AlUla. In October 2020, he was named in the startlist for the 2020 Giro d'Italia.

== Major results ==
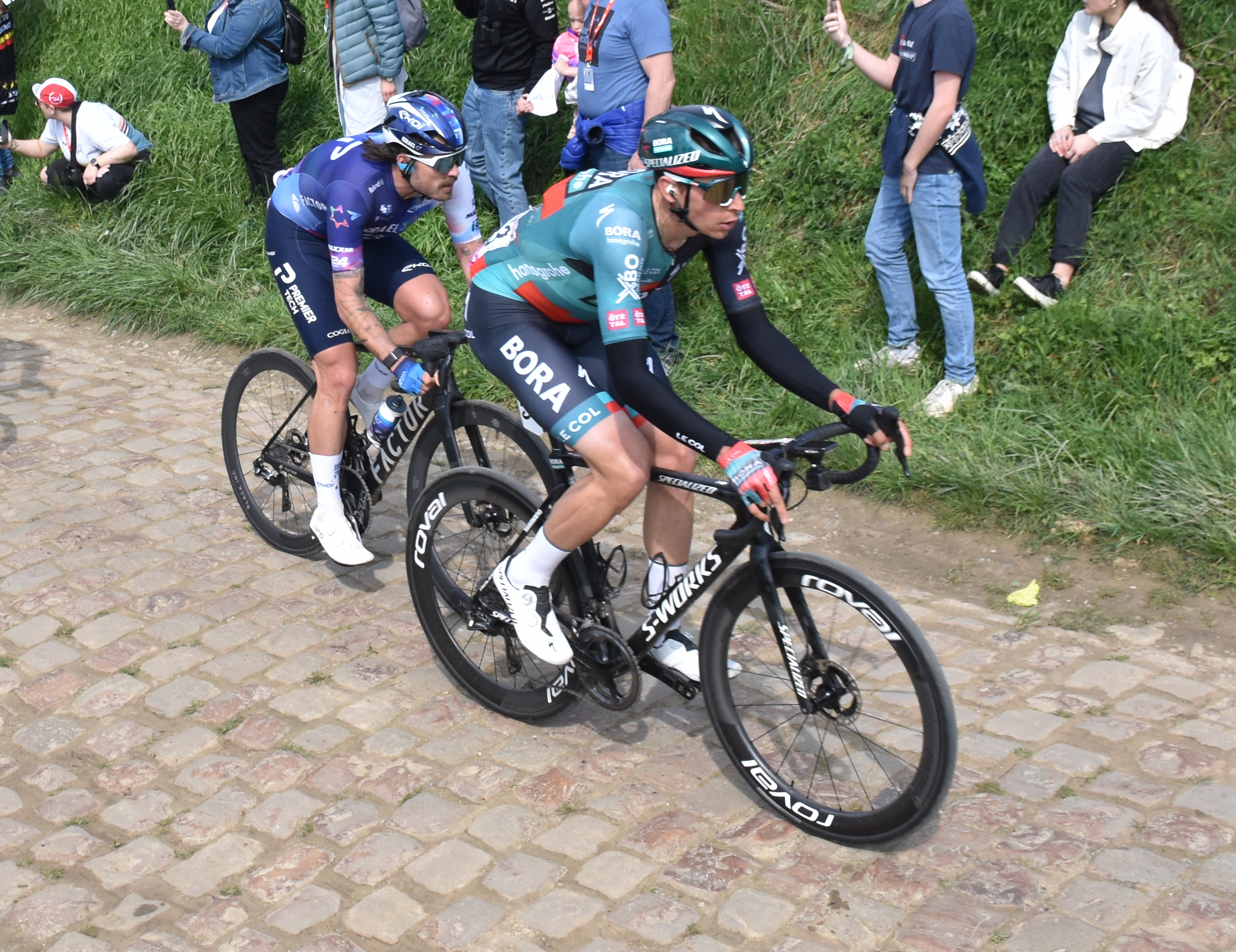
Paris-Roubaix 2023 - Secteur pavé de Quiévy à Saint-Python - N° 73 Patrick Gamper.

2014
National Junior Road Championships

1st Time trial
1st Road race

2015
1st Time trial, National Junior Road Championships
2016
1st Stage 6 Tour de Serbie
2017
3rd Raiffeisen Grand Prix
6th Time trial, UEC European Under-23 Road Championships
2019
1st Time trial, National Under-23 Road Championships
1st Gran Premio Industrie del Marmo
1st Stage 2 Giro del Friuli-Venezia Giulia
2nd Poreč Trophy
3rd Duo Normand (with Matthias Brändle)
9th Kattekoers
2020
2nd Time trial, National Road Championships
2021
National Road Championships

3rd Road race
5th Time trial

2022
2nd Road race, National Road Championships
2023
National Road Championships

1st Time trial
2nd Road race

2024
2nd Time trial, National Road Championships

=== Grand Tour general classification results timeline ===
Grand Tour	2020	2021	2022	2023	2024
Giro d'Italia	DNF	—	108		86
Tour de France	—	—	—	—	
Vuelta a España	—	112	—		

Legend
—	Did not compete
DNF	Did not finish
