= WSA KTM Graz p/b Leomo =

Austrian cycling team

Team information
- UCI code: WSA
- Registered: Austria
- Founded: 2011
- Discipline: Road
- Status: UCI Continental

Key personnel
- General manager: Christoph Resl
- Team managers: Werner Faltheiner; Florian Moser; Errol Rothschädl

Team name history
- 2011–2012 2013 2014–2017 2018 2019 2020–2021 2022–: WSA Viperbike; WSA; WSA–Greenlife; WSA–Pushbikers; Maloja Pushbikers; WSA KTM Graz; WSA KTM Graz p/b Leomo

WSA KTM Graz p/b Leomo is a UCI Continental team founded in 2011 and based in Austria. It participates in UCI Continental Circuits races.

== Team roster ==
As of 17 May 2023.

| Rider | Date of birth |
|---|---|
| Daniel Auer (AUT) | 26 October 1994 (age 31) |
| Adam Hansen (AUS) | 11 May 1981 (age 45) |
| Philipp Hofbauer (AUT) | 20 August 2002 (age 24) |
| Maximilian Kabas (AUT) | 2 August 2001 (age 25) |
| Stinus Kaempe (DEN) | 26 February 2001 (age 25) |

| Rider | Date of birth |
|---|---|
| Leo Kerschbaumer (AUT) | 17 February 2003 (age 23) |
| Stefan Marbler (AUT) | 12 September 2002 (age 23) |
| Martin Messner (AUT) | 9 January 2000 (age 26) |
| Maximilian Schmidbauer (AUT) | 23 December 2001 (age 24) |
| Thomas Tichler (AUT) | 23 May 2000 (age 26) |

== Major wins ==
2011
GP Betonexpressz 2000, Martin Schoffmann
2013
Tour Bohemia, Josef Benetseder
2017
Stage 3b Tour of Szeklerland, Markus Kopfauf
2018
Stage 2b (ITT) Tour of Bihor, Jodok Salzmann
GP Kranj, Daniel Auer
2019
Prologue Oberösterreichrundfahrt, Lukas Schlemmer
V4 Special Series Vasarosnameny - Nyiregyhaza, Daniel Auer
Stage 3b Cycling Tour of Szeklerland, Felix Ritzinger
2020
Austria National Road Race, Valentin Götzinger
2021
Stage 3 Belgrade Banjaluka, Daniel Auer
Stage 4 Tour of Szeklerland, Daniel Auer
2022
Umag Trophy, Daniel Auer
GP Slovenian Istria, Daniel Auer

== National champions ==
2020
Austria Road Race, Valentin Götzinger
