= Tour Bohemia =

Czech one-day road cycling race

Race details
- Date: September
- Region: Bohemia
- Discipline: Road
- Competition: UCI Europe Tour
- Type: One day race

History
- First edition: 2012
- Editions: 3
- Final edition: 2014
- First winner: Maroš Kováč (SVK)
- Most wins: No repeat winners
- Final winner: Lukas Pöstlberger (AUT)

The Tour Bohemia was a one-day cycling race held annually between 2012 and 2014 in the Czech Republic. It was part of UCI Europe Tour in category 1.2. It was replaced in 2015 by the East Bohemia Tour.

== Winners ==
Year	Country	Rider	Team
2012	Slovakia	Maroš Kováč	Dukla Trenčín–Trek
2013	Austria	Josef Benetseder	WSA–Greenlife
2014	Austria	Lukas Pöstlberger	Tirol Cycling Team
