= Michaela Brunngraber =

Austrian cyclist

Personal information
- Born: 16 December 1964 (age 61) Vienna, Austria

Cycling career
- Sport: Cycling

Michaela Brunngraber (born 16 December 1964) is an Austrian cyclist. She competed in the women's points race at the 2000 Summer Olympics.
