= Valentin Götzinger =

Austrian cyclist (born 2000)

Personal information
- Born: 12 December 2000 (age 25) Weinitzen, Austria
- Height: 1.76 m (5 ft 9 in)
- Weight: 71 kg (157 lb)

Cycling career
- Sport: Cycling
- Current team: WSA KTM Graz
- Discipline: Road
- Role: Rider

Professional teams
- 2019: Maloja Pushbikers
- 2020–: WSA KTM Graz

Valentin Götzinger (born 12 December 2000) is an Austrian racing cyclist, who currently rides for UCI Continental team WSA KTM Graz. In August 2020, he won the Austrian National Road Race Championships.

== Major results ==
2018
3rd Time trial, National Junior Road Championships
2019
3rd Time trial, National Under-23 Road Championships
2020
1st Road race, National Road Championships
8th GP Kranj
