= Tirol KTM Cycling Team =

Austrian cycling team

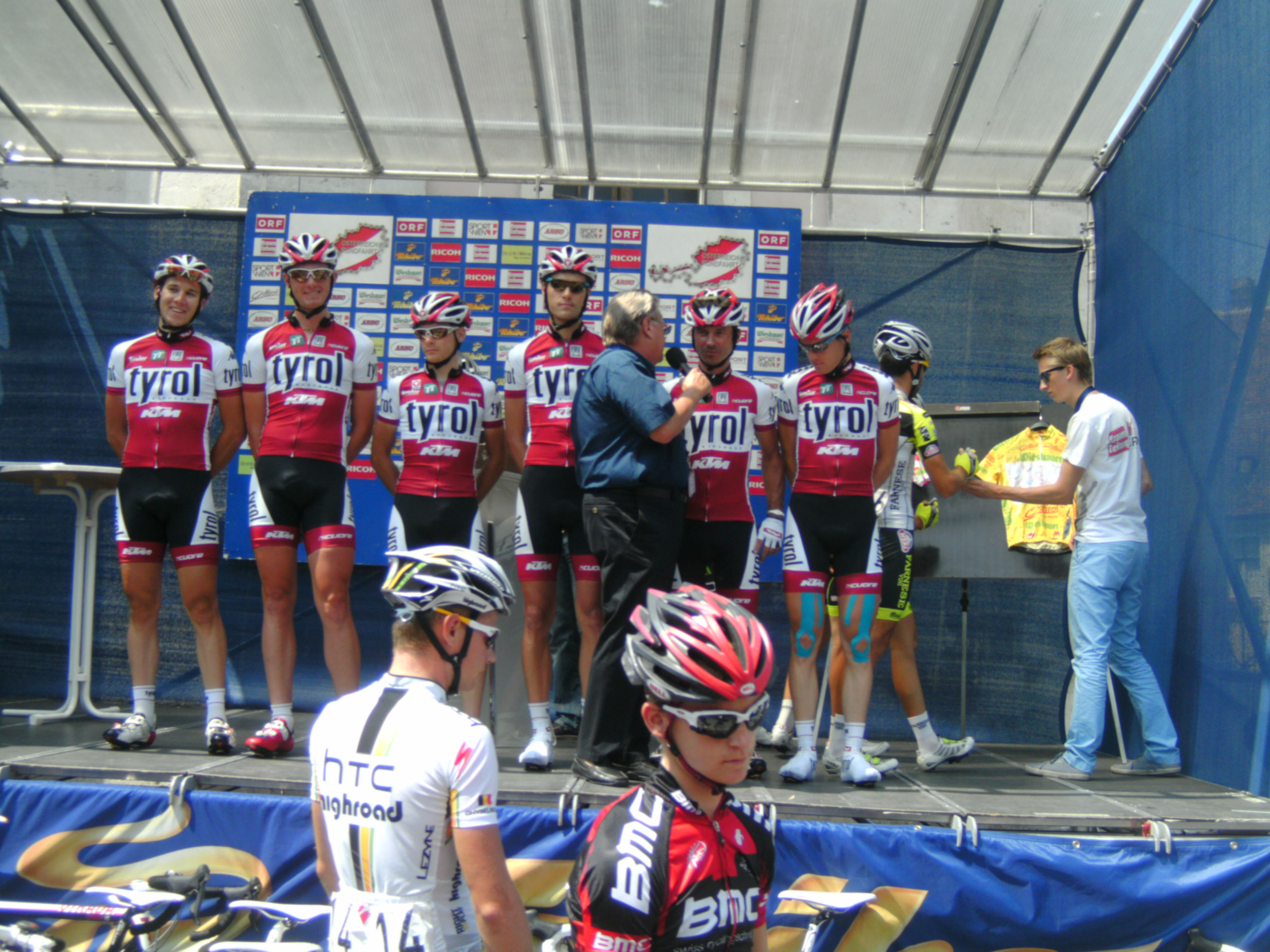

Team information
- Registered: Austria
- Founded: 2008
- Discipline: Road
- Status: UCI Continental

Key personnel
- General manager: Thomas Pupp
- Team managers: Frank Pennings; Harald Berger; Valter Bonča; Gregor Gazvoda; Gerrit Glomser; Peter Leo; Žiga Slak

Team name history
- 2008–2010 2011 2012–2018 2019–: Tyrol–Team Radland Tirol; Tyrol Team; Tirol Cycling Team; Tirol KTM Cycling Team

Tirol KTM Cycling Team is an Austrian UCI Continental team founded in 2008.

== Team roster ==
As of 10 March 2022.

Rider	Date of birth
Paul Buschek (AUT)	19 July 2002 (age 24)
Felix Engelhardt (GER)	19 August 2000 (age 26)
Matevž Govekar (SLO)	17 April 2000 (age 26)
Lukas Grießer (AUT)	8 July 2003 (age 23)
Emilio Halbmayer (AUT)	1 June 2003 (age 23)
Moritz Hörandtner (AUT)	25 June 2003 (age 23)
Stefan Kovar (AUT)	15 May 2002 (age 24)
Florian Lipowitz (GER)	21 September 2000 (age 25)

Rider	Date of birth
Logan McLain (USA)	8 February 2002 (age 24)
David Paumann (AUT)	19 November 2003 (age 22)
Kevin Pezzo Rosola (ITA)	30 November 2002 (age 23)
Linus Rosner (GER)	30 March 2001 (age 25)
Karel Vacek (CZE)	9 September 2000 (age 25)
Tim Wafler (AUT)	28 January 2002 (age 24)
Emanuel Zangerle (AUT)	24 September 2000 (age 25)

== Major wins ==
2011
Gran Premio Palio del Recioto, Georg Preidler
2012
Hungary National Time Trial Championships, Péter Palotai
Tour of Vojvodina II, Clemens Fankhauser
2014
Prologue Istrian Spring Trophy, Gregor Mühlberger
Trofeo Banca Popolare di Vicenza, Gregor Mühlberger
Overall Carpathian Couriers Race, Gregor Mühlberger

Stage 3 (ITT), Gregor Mühlberger

Overall An Post Rás, Clemens Fankhauser
Stage 3 Oberösterreich Rundfahrt, Gregor Mühlberger
Austria National Under-23 Road Race Championships, Gregor Mühlberger
Stage 5 Giro del Friuli-Venezia Giulia, Martin Weiss
Tour Bohemia, Lukas Pöstlberger
2015
Prologue Istrian Spring Trophy, Lukas Pöstlberger
Stage 1 Carpathian Couriers Race, Alexander Wachter
Overall An Post Rás, Lukas Pöstlberger
Stage 7 Tour of Austria, Lukas Pöstlberger
2016
Overall An Post Rás, Clemens Fankhauser
Stage 6 Tour de Serbie, Patrick Gamper
2017
GP Izola, Filippo Fortin
Stage 1 Szlakiem Grodów Piastowskich, Filippo Fortin
Tour de Berne, Filippo Fortin
Stage 1 Flèche du Sud, Filippo Fortin
Stage 5 Flèche du Sud, Matthias Krizek
Stage 2 Oberösterreich Rundfahrt, Filippo Fortin
Stage 7 Tour du Rwanda, Valens Ndayisenga
2018
Stage 2 Giro Ciclistico d'Italia, Markus Wildauer
Stage 3 Giro del Friuli-Venezia Giulia, Georg Zimmermann
2019
Trofeo Banca Popolare di Vicenza, Georg Zimmermann
Gran Premio Industrie del Marmo, Patrick Gamper
Coppa della Pace, Georg Zimmermann
Stage 2 Giro del Friuli-Venezia Giulia, Patrick Gamper
2022
Prologue Istrian Spring Trophy, Matevž Govekar
2025
Trofeo Città di San Vendemiano, Marco Schrettl
2026
1st Poreč Classic, Viggo Moore

== National Champions ==
2018
Australia Track (Madison), Rohan Wight
