= 2016 Okolo Slovenska =

2016 UCI Europe Tour

Race details
- Dates: 7–12 June
- Stages: 5 + Prologue
- Distance: 806.8 km (501.3 mi)
- Winning time: 18hr 45' 06"

Results
Jersey awarded to the overall winner	Winner	Mauro Finetto (ITA)	(Unieuro–Wilier)
	Second	Vitaliy Buts (UKR)	(Kolss BDC Team)
	Third	Kirill Pozdnyakov (RUS)	(Synergy Baku)
Jersey awarded to the points classification winner	Points	František Sisr (CZE)	(Klein Constantia)
Jersey awarded to the mountains classification winner	Mountains	Helmut Trettwer (GER)	(WSA–Greenlife)
Jersey awarded to the young rider classification winner	Young rider	Hamish Schreurs (NZL)	(Klein Constantia)
	Team	WIGGINS	

The 2016 Okolo Slovenska (English: Tour of Slovakia) was a six-day cycling stage race that took place in Slovakia in June 2016. The race is the 60th edition of the Okolo Slovenska. It was rated as a 2.2 event as part of the 2016 UCI Europe Tour. The race included five stages+Prologue, starting in Banská Bystrica on 7 June and returning there for the finish on 12 June in Piešťany.

== Schedule ==
Stage characteristics and winners
Stage	Date	Course	Distance	Type	Winner
P	7 June	Banská Bystrica	1.1 km (0.7 mi)	Individual time trial	Dennis Bakker (NED)
1	8 June	Banská Bystrica to Banská Bystrica	136.8 km (85 mi)	Hilly stage	Matteo Malucelli (ITA)
2	9 June	Banská Bystrica to Štrbské Pleso	170.1 km (106 mi)	Mountain stage	Mauro Finetto (ITA)
3	10 June	Štrbské Pleso to Zuberec	193.2 km (120 mi)	Hilly stage	Markus Eibegger (AUT)
4	11 June	Zuberec to Bojnice	183.7 km (114 mi)	Intermediate stage	Stephan Rabitsch (AUT)
5	12 June	Bojnice to Piešťany	121.9 km (76 mi)	Flat stage	Jan Tratnik (SLO)
Total		806.8 km (501.3 mi)			

== Participating teams ==
Twenty-four (24) team participated in the 2016 edition of the Okolo Slovenska.

UCI Continental teams

- Dukla Banská Bystrica
- Marlux–Napoleon Games
- Parkhotel Valkenburg Continental Team
- Unieuro–Wilier
- GM Europa Ovini
- Synergy Baku
- WIGGINS
- Klein Constantia
- Whirlpool–Author
- CK Příbram Fany Gastro
- Meridiana–Kamen
- Amplatz–BMC
- Team Felbermayr–Simplon Wels
- WSA–Greenlife
- LKT Team Brandenburg
- Team FixIT.no
- Kolss BDC Team
- Staki–Baltik Vairas

Other teams

- Regional Team Central Slovakia
- Lotto Soudal U23

National teams

- Slovakia
- Latvia
- Belarus
- Morocco

== Stages ==
=== Prologue ===
7 June 2016 – Banská Bystrica, 1.1 km (0.7 mi), individual time trial (ITT)

Prologue Result and General Classification after Prologue
Rank	Rider	Team	Time
1	Dennis Bakker (NED)	Parkhotel Valkenburg Continental Team	1' 25"
2	Kevin Pauwels (BEL)	Marlux–Napoleon Games	+ 1"
3	Maroš Kováč (SVK)	Dukla Banská Bystrica	+ 1"
4	Milan Menten (BEL)	Lotto Soudal U23	+ 2"
5	Matteo Malucelli (ITA)	Unieuro–Wilier	+ 2"
6	Klāvs Rubenis (LAT)	Latvia (national)	+ 2"
7	Juraj Bellan (SVK)	Dukla Banská Bystrica	+ 3"
8	Filippo Fortin (ITA)	GM Europa Ovini	+ 3"
9	František Sisr (CZE)	Klein Constantia	+ 3"
10	Michael Vanthourenhout (BEL)	Marlux–Napoleon Games	+ 3"

=== Stage 1 ===
8 June 2016 – Banská Bystrica to Banská Bystrica via (Sliač), 136.8 km (85.0 mi)

Result of Stage 1
Rank	Rider	Team	Time
1	Matteo Malucelli (ITA)	Unieuro–Wilier	3h 00' 49"
2	Filippo Fortin (ITA)	GM Europa Ovini	s.t.
3	František Sisr (CZE)	Klein Constantia	s.t.
4	Alois Kaňkovský (CZE)	Whirlpool–Author	s.t.
5	Willi Willwohl (GER)	LKT Team Brandenburg	s.t.
6	Michele Viola (ITA)	Meridiana–Kamen	s.t.
7	Leon Rohde (GER)	LKT Team Brandenburg	s.t.
8	Davide Mucelli (ITA)	Meridiana–Kamen	s.t.
9	Samir Jabrayilov (AZE)	Synergy Baku	s.t.
10	Maroš Kováč (SVK)	Dukla Banská Bystrica	s.t.

General classification after Stage 1
Rank	Rider	Team	Time
1	Matteo Malucelli (ITA)	Unieuro–Wilier	3h 02' 06"
2	Filippo Fortin (ITA)	GM Europa Ovini	+ 5"
3	František Sisr (CZE)	Klein Constantia	+ 7"
4	Milan Menten (BEL)	Lotto Soudal U23	+ 7"
5	Juraj Bellan (SVK)	Dukla Banská Bystrica	+ 8"
6	Dennis Bakker (NED)	Parkhotel Valkenburg Continental Team	+ 8"
7	Kevin Pauwels (BEL)	Marlux–Napoleon Games	+ 9"
8	Maroš Kováč (SVK)	Dukla Banská Bystrica	+ 9"
9	Peter Schulting (NED)	Parkhotel Valkenburg Continental Team	+ 10"
10	Maximilian Schachmann (GER)	Klein Constantia	+ 11"

=== Stage 2 ===
9 June 2016 – Banská Bystrica to Štrbské Pleso, 170.1 km (105.7 mi)

Result of Stage 2
Rank	Rider	Team	Time
1	Mauro Finetto (ITA)	Unieuro–Wilier	4h 21' 46"
2	Kirill Pozdnyakov (RUS)	Synergy Baku	s.t.
3	Vitaliy Buts (UKR)	Kolss BDC Team	s.t.
4	Hamish Schreurs (NZL)	Klein Constantia	+ 2"
5	Mark Christian (GBR)	WIGGINS	+ 6"
6	Antonio Santoro (ITA)	Meridiana–Kamen	+ 1' 54"
7	Kevin Pauwels (BEL)	Marlux–Napoleon Games	+ 1' 54"
8	Florian Bissinger (GER)	WSA–Greenlife	+ 1' 54"
9	James Knox (GBR)	WIGGINS	+ 1' 54"
10	Matteo Rabottini (ITA)	Meridiana–Kamen	+ 1' 54"

General classification after Stage 2
Rank	Rider	Team	Time
1	Mauro Finetto (ITA)	Unieuro–Wilier	7h 23' 52"
2	Vitaliy Buts (UKR)	Kolss BDC Team	+ 9"
3	Kirill Pozdnyakov (RUS)	Synergy Baku	+ 9"
4	Hamish Schreurs (NZL)	Klein Constantia	+ 13"
5	Mark Christian (GBR)	WIGGINS	+ 19"
6	Kevin Pauwels (BEL)	Marlux–Napoleon Games	+ 2' 03"
7	Florian Bissinger (GER)	WSA–Greenlife	+ 2' 06"
8	Peter Schulting (NED)	Parkhotel Valkenburg Continental Team	+ 2' 06"
9	Maximilian Schachmann (GER)	Klein Constantia	+ 2' 07"
10	Mikkel Frølich Honoré (DEN)	Lotto Soudal U23	+ 2' 08"

=== Stage 3 ===
10 June 2016 – Štrbské Pleso to Zuberec, 193.2 km (120.0 mi)

Result of Stage 3
Rank	Rider	Team	Time
1	Markus Eibegger (AUT)	Team Felbermayr–Simplon Wels	4h 32' 09"
2	Jan Tratnik (SLO)	Amplatz–BMC	+ 1"
3	František Sisr (CZE)	Klein Constantia	+ 1"
4	Filippo Fortin (ITA)	GM Europa Ovini	+ 1"
5	Marek Čanecký (SVK)	Amplatz–BMC	+ 1"
6	Dion Beukeboom (NED)	Parkhotel Valkenburg Continental Team	+ 1"
7	Fabian Schormair (GER)	LKT Team Brandenburg	+ 1"
8	Matteo Rabottini (ITA)	Meridiana–Kamen	+ 1"
9	Emiel Planckaert (BEL)	Lotto Soudal U23	+ 1"
10	Florian Bissinger (GER)	WSA–Greenlife	+ 1"

General classification after Stage 3
Rank	Rider	Team	Time
1	Mauro Finetto (ITA)	Unieuro–Wilier	11h 56' 02"
2	Vitaliy Buts (UKR)	Kolss BDC Team	+ 7"
3	Kirill Pozdnyakov (RUS)	Synergy Baku	+ 9"
4	Hamish Schreurs (NZL)	Klein Constantia	+ 13"
5	Mark Christian (GBR)	WIGGINS	+ 19"
6	Markus Eibegger (AUT)	Team Felbermayr–Simplon Wels	+ 1' 59"
7	Kevin Pauwels (BEL)	Marlux–Napoleon Games	+ 2' 03"
8	Peter Schulting (NED)	Parkhotel Valkenburg Continental Team	+ 2' 03"
9	Maximilian Schachmann (GER)	Klein Constantia	+ 2' 04"
10	Florian Bissinger (GER)	WSA–Greenlife	+ 2' 06"

=== Stage 4 ===
11 June 2016 – Zuberec to Bojnice, 183.7 km (114.1 mi)

Result of Stage 4
Rank	Rider	Team	Time
1	Stephan Rabitsch (AUT)	Team Felbermayr–Simplon Wels	4h 07' 13"
2	Liam Holohan (GBR)	WIGGINS	s.t.
3	Filippo Fortin (ITA)	GM Europa Ovini	+ 32"
4	František Sisr (CZE)	Klein Constantia	+ 32"
5	Michele Viola (ITA)	Meridiana–Kamen	+ 32"
6	Edward Planckaert (BEL)	Lotto Soudal U23	+ 32"
7	Leon Rohde (GER)	LKT Team Brandenburg	+ 32"
8	Davide Mucelli (ITA)	Meridiana–Kamen	+ 32"
9	Jiří Šorm (CZE)	Whirlpool–Author	+ 32"
10	Maksym Averin (AZE)	Synergy Baku	+ 32"

General classification after Stage 4
Rank	Rider	Team	Time
1	Mauro Finetto (ITA)	Unieuro–Wilier	16h 03' 47"
2	Vitaliy Buts (UKR)	Kolss BDC Team	+ 7"
3	Kirill Pozdnyakov (RUS)	Synergy Baku	+ 9"
4	Hamish Schreurs (NZL)	Klein Constantia	+ 13"
5	Mark Christian (GBR)	WIGGINS	+ 19"
6	Stephan Rabitsch (AUT)	Team Felbermayr–Simplon Wels	+ 1' 26"
7	Liam Holohan (GBR)	WIGGINS	+ 1' 30"
8	Markus Eibegger (AUT)	Team Felbermayr–Simplon Wels	+ 1' 59"
9	Kevin Pauwels (BEL)	Marlux–Napoleon Games	+ 2' 03"
10	Peter Schulting (NED)	Parkhotel Valkenburg Continental Team	+ 2' 03"

=== Stage 5 ===
12 June 2016 – Bojnice to Piešťany, 121.9 km (75.7 mi)

Result of Stage 5
Rank	Rider	Team	Time
1	Jan Tratnik (SLO)	Amplatz–BMC	2h 39' 39"
2	Florian Bissinger (GER)	WSA–Greenlife	s.t.
3	František Sisr (CZE)	Klein Constantia	+ 1' 40"
4	Filippo Fortin (ITA)	GM Europa Ovini	+ 1' 40"
5	Alois Kaňkovský (CZE)	Whirlpool–Author	+ 1' 40"
6	Matteo Malucelli (ITA)	Unieuro–Wilier	+ 1' 40"
7	Leon Rohde (GER)	LKT Team Brandenburg	+ 1' 40"
8	Andris Smirnovs (LAT)	Latvia (national)	+ 1' 40"
9	Jannik Steimle (GER)	Team Felbermayr–Simplon Wels	+ 1' 40"
10	Jan Stöhr (CZE)	CK Příbram Fany Gastro	+ 1' 40"

General classification after Stage 5
Rank	Rider	Team	Time
1	Mauro Finetto (ITA)	Unieuro–Wilier	18h 45' 06"
2	Vitaliy Buts (UKR)	Kolss BDC Team	+ 7"
3	Kirill Pozdnyakov (RUS)	Synergy Baku	+ 9"
4	Florian Bissinger (GER)	WSA–Greenlife	+ 11"
5	Hamish Schreurs (NZL)	Klein Constantia	+ 13"
6	Mark Christian (GBR)	WIGGINS	+ 19"
7	Jan Tratnik (SLO)	Amplatz–BMC	+ 40"
8	Stephan Rabitsch (AUT)	Team Felbermayr–Simplon Wels	+ 1' 26"
9	Liam Holohan (GBR)	WIGGINS	+ 1' 30"
10	Markus Eibegger (AUT)	Team Felbermayr–Simplon Wels	+ 1' 59"

== Classification leadership table ==
Stage	Winner	General classification žltý dres	Points classification biely dres s modrým bodkami	Mountains classification biely dres s červenými bodkami	Young rider classification biely dres	Best Slovakian rider bielo-modro-červený dres	Team classification
P	Dennis Bakker	Dennis Bakker	not awarded	not awarded	Milan Menten	Maroš Kováč	Dukla Banská Bystrica
1	Matteo Malucelli	Matteo Malucelli	Matteo Malucelli	Jhonatan Narváez	Milan Menten	Juraj Bellan	Dukla Banská Bystrica
2	Mauro Finetto	Mauro Finetto	Mauro Finetto	Helmut Trettwer	Hamish Schreurs	Marek Čanecký	Klein Constantia
3	Markus Eibegger	Mauro Finetto	František Sisr	Helmut Trettwer	Hamish Schreurs	Marek Čanecký	Klein Constantia
4	Stephan Rabitsch	Mauro Finetto	Filippo Fortin	Helmut Trettwer	Hamish Schreurs	Marek Čanecký	WIGGINS
5	Jan Tratnik	Mauro Finetto	František Sisr	Helmut Trettwer	Hamish Schreurs	Marek Čanecký	WIGGINS
Final		Mauro Finetto	František Sisr	Helmut Trettwer	Hamish Schreurs	Marek Čanecký	WIGGINS

== Final standings ==
Legend
General classification	Denotes the leader of the General classification	Points classification	Denotes the leader of the Points classification
Mountains classification	Denotes the leader of the Mountains classification	Young rider classification	Denotes the leader of the Young rider classification

=== General classification ===
	Rider	Team	Time
1	Mauro Finetto (ITA)	Unieuro–Wilier	18h 45' 06"
2	Vitaliy Buts (UKR)	Kolss BDC Team	+ 7"
3	Kirill Pozdnyakov (RUS)	Synergy Baku	+ 9"
4	Florian Bissinger (GER)	WSA–Greenlife	+ 11"
5	Hamish Schreurs (NZL)	Klein Constantia	+ 13"
6	Mark Christian (GBR)	WIGGINS	+ 19"
7	Jan Tratnik (SLO)	Amplatz–BMC	+ 40"
8	Stephan Rabitsch (AUT)	Team Felbermayr–Simplon Wels	+ 1' 26"
9	Liam Holohan (GBR)	WIGGINS	+ 1' 30"
10	Markus Eibegger (AUT)	Team Felbermayr–Simplon Wels	+ 1' 59"

=== Points classification ===
	Rider	Team	Points
1	František Sisr (CZE)	Klein Constantia	31
2	Filippo Fortin (ITA)	GM Europa Ovini	31
3	Jan Tratnik (SLO)	Amplatz–BMC	25
4	Florian Bissinger (GER)	WSA–Greenlife	22
5	Matteo Malucelli (ITA)	Unieuro–Wilier	16
6	Stephan Rabitsch (AUT)	Team Felbermayr–Simplon Wels	14
7	Mauro Finetto (ITA)	Unieuro–Wilier	13
8	Liam Holohan (GBR)	WIGGINS	13
9	Alois Kaňkovský (CZE)	Whirlpool–Author	13
10	Markus Eibegger (AUT)	Team Felbermayr–Simplon Wels	12

=== Mountains classification ===
	Rider	Team	Points
1	Helmut Trettwer (GER)	WSA–Greenlife	28
2	Jhonatan Narváez (ECU)	Klein Constantia	15
3	Stephan Rabitsch (AUT)	Team Felbermayr–Simplon Wels	13
4	Antonio Santoro (ITA)	Meridiana–Kamen	11
5	Hamish Schreurs (NZL)	Klein Constantia	8
6	Jan Tratnik (SLO)	Amplatz–BMC	7
7	Matteo Rabottini (ITA)	Meridiana–Kamen	6
8	Liam Holohan (GBR)	WIGGINS	5
9	Mark Christian (GBR)	WIGGINS	4
10	James McLaughlin (GBR)	Team Felbermayr–Simplon Wels	4

=== Young riders classification (U23) ===
	Rider	Team	Time
1	Hamish Schreurs (NZL)	Klein Constantia	18h 45' 19"
2	Maximilian Schachmann (GER)	Klein Constantia	+ 1' 50"
3	Mikkel Frølich Honoré (DEN)	Lotto Soudal U23	+ 1' 55"
4	James Knox (GBR)	WIGGINS	+ 1' 57"
5	Jhonatan Narváez (ECU)	Klein Constantia	+ 2' 01"
6	Daniel Pearson (GBR)	WIGGINS	+ 2' 03"
7	Fabian Schormair (GER)	LKT Team Brandenburg	+ 2' 33"
8	Eriks Toms Gavars (LAT)	Latvia	+ 2' 37"
9	Juraj Bellan (SVK)	Dukla Banská Bystrica	+ 2' 50"
10	Ľuboš Malovec (SVK)	Slovakia U23	+ 3' 00"

=== Best Slovak rider classification ===
	Rider	Team	Time
1	Marek Čanecký	Amplatz–BMC	18h 47' 13"
2	Patrik Tybor	Dukla Banská Bystrica	s.t.
3	Juraj Bellan	Dukla Banská Bystrica	+ 56"
4	Ľuboš Malovec	Slovakia U23	+ 1' 06"
5	Roman Broniš	CK Příbram Fany Gastro	+ 1' 22"
6	Martin Haring	Dukla Banská Bystrica	+ 1' 23"
7	Ondrej Glajza	Slovakia U23	+ 2' 37"
8	Filip Taragel	Region West Slovakia	+ 24' 31"
9	Maroš Kováč	Dukla Banská Bystrica	+ 35' 08"
10	Tomáš Višňovský	Region West Slovakia	+ 35' 14"

=== Team classification ===
	Team	Time
1	WIGGINS	56h 19' 27"
2	Klein Constantia	+ 19"
3	Kolss BDC Team	+ 43"
4	Unieuro–Wilier	+ 1' 38"
5	Team Felbermayr–Simplon Wels	+ 1' 44"
6	Meridiana–Kamen	+ 2' 25"
7	Amplatz–BMC	+ 2' 27"
8	Parkhotel Valkenburg Continental Team	+ 3' 04"
9	Lotto Soudal U23	+ 3' 12"
10	Whirlpool–Author	+ 4' 07"
