= 2017 Tour of Austria =

2017 UCI Europe Tour

Race details
- Dates: 2–8 July 2017
- Stages: 6 + Prologue
- Distance: 1,121.7 km (697.0 mi)
- Winning time: 27h 10' 07"

Results
Jersey awarded to the overall winner	Winner	Stefan Denifl (AUT)	(Aqua Blue Sport)
	Second	Delio Fernández (ESP)	(Delko–Marseille Provence KTM)
	Third	Miguel Ángel López (COL)	(Astana)
Jersey awarded to the points classification winner	Points	Sep Vanmarcke (BEL)	(Cannondale–Drapac)
Jersey awarded to the mountains classification winner	Mountains	Pieter Weening (NED)	(Roompot–Nederlandse Loterij)
	Team	Team Dimension Data	

The 2017 Tour of Austria (German: Österreich-Rundfahrt 2017) was the 69th edition of the Tour of Austria cycling stage race. The 1,121.7-kilometre (697.0 mi)-long race started in Graz on 2 July with a prologue individual time trial up the Schloßberg hill, and concluded in Wels on 8 July.

The race consisted of 6 road stages and the aforementioned prologue, one stage less than the 2016 edition. The race was part of the 2017 UCI Europe Tour, and was rated as a 2.1 event.

The race was won by home rider Stefan Denifl (Aqua Blue Sport), who took the first victory of his professional career. Denifl finished 37 seconds clear of Spain's Delio Fernández, riding for the Delko–Marseille Provence KTM squad, while the podium was completed by Colombian Miguel Ángel López of Astana, 59 seconds down on Denifl but a winner of the race's queen stage to the Kitzbüheler Horn. In the race's other classifications, Sep Vanmarcke (Cannondale–Drapac) was the winner of the points classification, Pieter Weening of Roompot–Nederlandse Loterij was the winner of the mountains classification, while Team Dimension Data were the winners of the teams classification.

== Schedule ==
The route for the race was announced on 9 June 2017.

Stage characteristics and winners
Stage	Date	Course	Distance	Type	Winner
P	2 July	Schloßberg (Graz)	0.8 km (0.5 mi)	Mountain time trial	Oscar Gatto (ITA)
1	3 July	Graz to Vienna	196.0 km (122 mi)	Medium-mountain stage	Elia Viviani (ITA)
2	4 July	Vienna to Pöggstall	199.6 km (124 mi)	Hilly stage	Tom-Jelte Slagter (NED)
3	5 July	Wieselburg to Altheim	226.2 km (141 mi)	Hilly stage	Elia Viviani (ITA)
4	6 July	Salzburg Airport to Kitzbüheler Horn	82.7 km (51 mi)	Mountain stage	Miguel Ángel López (COL)
5	7 July	Kitzbühel to Alpendorf	212.5 km (132 mi)	Mountain stage	Ben O'Connor (AUS)
6	8 July	Alpendorf to Wels	203.9 km (127 mi)	Medium-mountain stage	Clément Venturini (FRA)
Total		1,121.7 km (697.0 mi)			

== Participating teams ==
Nineteen teams were initially scheduled to compete in the 2017 edition of the Tour of Austria, as announced on 9 June 2017. These included four UCI WorldTeams, eight UCI Professional Continental teams, six UCI Continental teams and an Italian national team.

Bardiani–CSF were denied entry to the race, after the squad was banned for 30 days following the positive doping tests for Stefano Pirazzi and Nicola Ruffoni prior to the Giro d'Italia.

UCI WorldTeams

- Astana
- Cannondale–Drapac
- Team Dimension Data
- Team Katusha–Alpecin

UCI Professional Continental teams

- Aqua Blue Sport
- CCC–Sprandi–Polkowice
- Cofidis
- Delko–Marseille Provence KTM
- Gazprom–RusVelo
- Israel Cycling Academy
- Roompot–Nederlandse Loterij

UCI Continental teams

- Amplatz–BMC
- Team Felbermayr–Simplon Wels
- Hrinkow Advarics Cycleang
- Tirol Cycling Team
- Team Vorarlberg
- WSA–Greenlife

National teams

- Italy

== Stages ==
=== Prologue ===
2 July 2017 — Schloßberg (Graz), 0.8 km (0.5 mi), individual time trial (ITT)

Prologue result and General classification after Prologue
Rank	Rider	Team	Time
1	Oscar Gatto (ITA)	Astana	2' 11"
2	Miguel Ángel López (COL)	Astana	+ 1"
3	Will Clarke (AUS)	Cannondale–Drapac	+ 4"
4	Markus Eibegger (AUT)	Team Felbermayr–Simplon Wels	+ 6"
5	Sep Vanmarcke (BEL)	Cannondale–Drapac	+ 7"
6	Anthony Perez (FRA)	Cofidis	+ 7"
7	Andrea Vendrame (ITA)	Italy (national team)	+ 8"
8	Jan Tratnik (SLO)	CCC–Sprandi–Polkowice	+ 8"
9	Pieter Weening (NED)	Roompot–Nederlandse Loterij	+ 9"
10	Lukas Schlemmer (AUT)	Team Felbermayr–Simplon Wels	+ 10"

=== Stage 1 ===
3 July 2017 — Graz to Vienna, 196 km (121.8 mi)

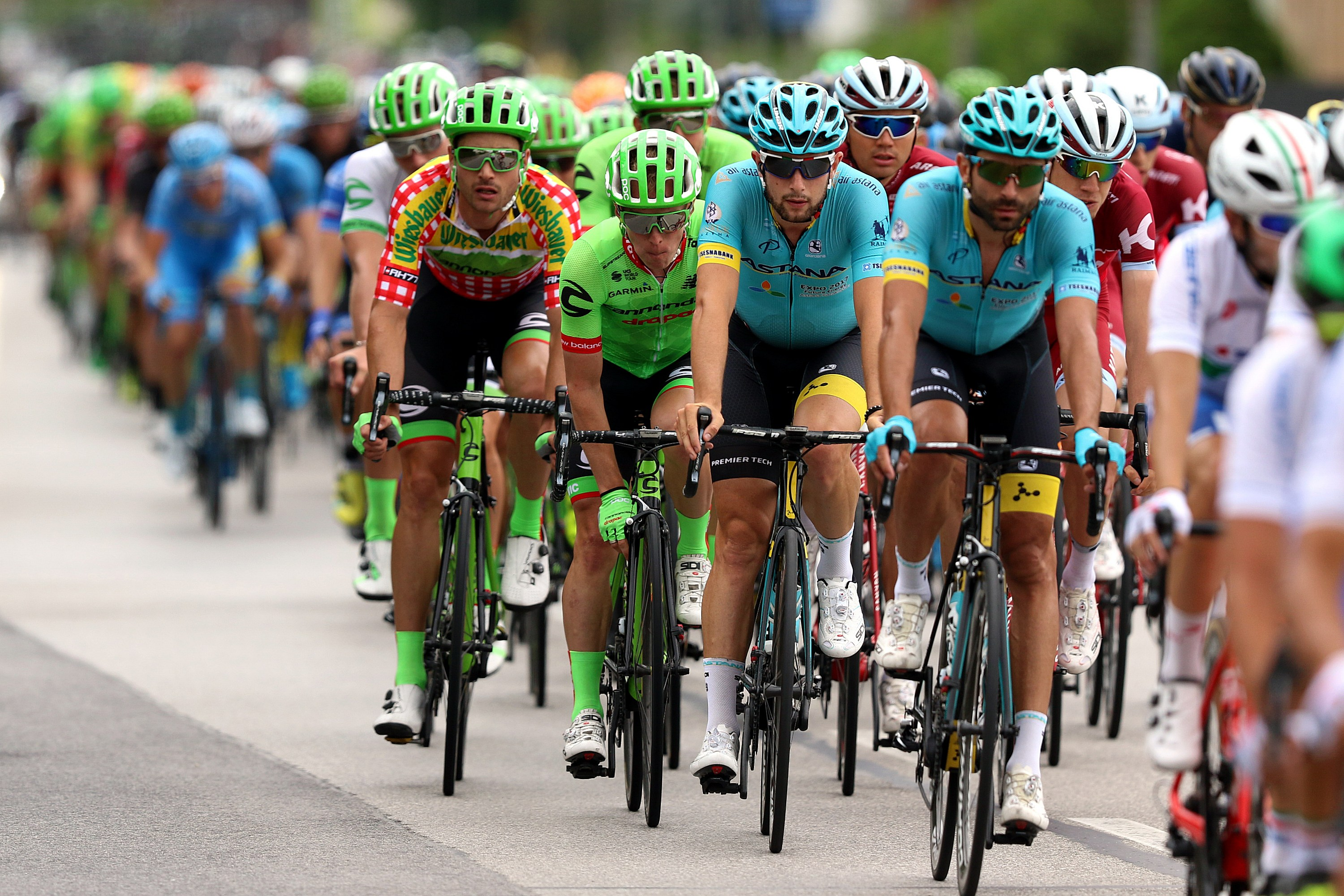
The peloton during the first stage of the race.

Stage 1 result
Rank	Rider	Team	Time
1	Elia Viviani (ITA)	Italy (national team)	4h 28' 50"
2	Sep Vanmarcke (BEL)	Cannondale–Drapac	+ 0"
3	Jason Lowndes (AUS)	Israel Cycling Academy	+ 0"
4	Rok Korošec (SLO)	Amplatz–BMC	+ 0"
5	Youcef Reguigui (ALG)	Team Dimension Data	+ 0"
6	Alexander Porsev (RUS)	Gazprom–RusVelo	+ 0"
7	Clément Venturini (FRA)	Cofidis	+ 0"
8	Ryan Gibbons (RSA)	Team Dimension Data	+ 0"
9	Alex Howes (USA)	Cannondale–Drapac	+ 0"
10	Andrew Fenn (GBR)	Aqua Blue Sport	+ 0"

General classification after Stage 1
Rank	Rider	Team	Time
1	Sep Vanmarcke (BEL)	Cannondale–Drapac	4h 31' 02"
2	Will Clarke (AUS)	Cannondale–Drapac	+ 3"
3	Markus Eibegger (AUT)	Team Felbermayr–Simplon Wels	+ 5"
4	Andrea Vendrame (ITA)	Italy (national team)	+ 7"
5	Elia Viviani (ITA)	Italy (national team)	+ 9"
6	Stephan Rabitsch (AUT)	Team Felbermayr–Simplon Wels	+ 10"
7	Jhonatan Restrepo (COL)	Team Katusha–Alpecin	+ 11"
8	Sven Erik Bystrøm (NOR)	Team Katusha–Alpecin	+ 11"
9	Ivan Savitskiy (RUS)	Gazprom–RusVelo	+ 11"
10	Felix Großschartner (AUT)	CCC–Sprandi–Polkowice	+ 11"

=== Stage 2 ===
4 July 2017 — Vienna to Pöggstall, 199.6 km (124.0 mi)

Stage 2 result
Rank	Rider	Team	Time
1	Tom-Jelte Slagter (NED)	Cannondale–Drapac	5h 00' 08"
2	Mekseb Debesay (ERI)	Team Dimension Data	+ 0"
3	Miguel Ángel López (COL)	Astana	+ 0"
4	Martijn Tusveld (NED)	Roompot–Nederlandse Loterij	+ 0"
5	Sep Vanmarcke (BEL)	Cannondale–Drapac	+ 9"
6	Clément Venturini (FRA)	Cofidis	+ 9"
7	Sven Erik Bystrøm (NOR)	Team Katusha–Alpecin	+ 9"
8	Ivan Savitskiy (RUS)	Gazprom–RusVelo	+ 9"
9	Manuel Belletti (ITA)	Italy (national team)	+ 9"
10	Guillaume Boivin (CAN)	Israel Cycling Academy	+ 9"

General classification after Stage 2
Rank	Rider	Team	Time
1	Sep Vanmarcke (BEL)	Cannondale–Drapac	9h 31' 19"
2	Andrea Vendrame (ITA)	Italy (national team)	+ 7"
3	Stephan Rabitsch (AUT)	Team Felbermayr–Simplon Wels	+ 10"
4	Sven Erik Bystrøm (NOR)	Team Katusha–Alpecin	+ 11"
5	Ivan Savitskiy (RUS)	Gazprom–RusVelo	+ 11"
6	Felix Großschartner (AUT)	CCC–Sprandi–Polkowice	+ 11"
7	Delio Fernández (ESP)	Delko–Marseille Provence KTM	+ 12"
8	Stefan Denifl (AUT)	Aqua Blue Sport	+ 12"
9	Clément Venturini (FRA)	Cofidis	+ 15"
10	Ben O'Connor (AUS)	Team Dimension Data	+ 19"

=== Stage 3 ===
5 July 2017 — Wieselburg to Altheim, 226.2 km (140.6 mi)

Stage 3 result
Rank	Rider	Team	Time
1	Elia Viviani (ITA)	Italy (national team)	5h 22' 12"
2	Jason Lowndes (AUS)	Israel Cycling Academy	+ 0"
3	Sep Vanmarcke (BEL)	Cannondale–Drapac	+ 0"
4	Filippo Fortin (ITA)	Tirol Cycling Team	+ 0"
5	Clément Venturini (FRA)	Cofidis	+ 0"
6	Ryan Gibbons (RSA)	Team Dimension Data	+ 0"
7	Sjoerd van Ginneken (NED)	Roompot–Nederlandse Loterij	+ 0"
8	Riccardo Minali (ITA)	Astana	+ 0"
9	Rok Korošec (SLO)	Amplatz–BMC	+ 0"
10	Fabian Lienhard (SUI)	Team Vorarlberg	+ 0"

General classification after Stage 3
Rank	Rider	Team	Time
1	Sep Vanmarcke (BEL)	Cannondale–Drapac	14h 53' 27"
2	Andrea Vendrame (ITA)	Italy (national team)	+ 11"
3	Stephan Rabitsch (AUT)	Team Felbermayr–Simplon Wels	+ 14"
4	Sven Erik Bystrøm (NOR)	Team Katusha–Alpecin	+ 15"
5	Ivan Savitskiy (RUS)	Gazprom–RusVelo	+ 15"
6	Felix Großschartner (AUT)	CCC–Sprandi–Polkowice	+ 15"
7	Delio Fernández (ESP)	Delko–Marseille Provence KTM	+ 16"
8	Stefan Denifl (AUT)	Aqua Blue Sport	+ 16"
9	Clément Venturini (FRA)	Cofidis	+ 19"
10	Ben O'Connor (AUS)	Team Dimension Data	+ 23"

=== Stage 4 ===
6 July 2017 — Salzburg Airport to Kitzbüheler Horn, 82.7 km (51.4 mi)

Stage 4 result
Rank	Rider	Team	Time
1	Miguel Ángel López (COL)	Astana	2h 09' 16"
2	Stefan Denifl (AUT)	Aqua Blue Sport	+ 17"
3	Giulio Ciccone (ITA)	Italy (national team)	+ 50"
4	Alexey Rybalkin (RUS)	Gazprom–RusVelo	+ 52"
5	Delio Fernández (ESP)	Delko–Marseille Provence KTM	+ 52"
6	Rein Taaramäe (EST)	Team Katusha–Alpecin	+ 54"
7	Ángel Madrazo (ESP)	Delko–Marseille Provence KTM	+ 1' 14"
8	Sergey Firsanov (RUS)	Gazprom–RusVelo	+ 1' 26"
9	Martijn Tusveld (NED)	Roompot–Nederlandse Loterij	+ 1' 31"
10	Felix Großschartner (AUT)	CCC–Sprandi–Polkowice	+ 1' 33"

General classification after Stage 4
Rank	Rider	Team	Time
1	Stefan Denifl (AUT)	Aqua Blue Sport	17h 03' 10"
2	Delio Fernández (ESP)	Delko–Marseille Provence KTM	+ 41"
3	Miguel Ángel López (COL)	Astana	+ 56"
4	Rein Taaramäe (EST)	Team Katusha–Alpecin	+ 1' 01"
5	Felix Großschartner (AUT)	CCC–Sprandi–Polkowice	+ 1' 21"
6	Daniel Teklehaimanot (ERI)	Team Dimension Data	+ 2' 21"
7	Giulio Ciccone (ITA)	Italy (national team)	+ 2' 22"
8	Alexey Rybalkin (RUS)	Gazprom–RusVelo	+ 2' 32"
9	Ángel Madrazo (ESP)	Delko–Marseille Provence KTM	+ 2' 43"
10	Martijn Tusveld (NED)	Roompot–Nederlandse Loterij	+ 2' 50"

=== Stage 5 ===
7 July 2017 — Kitzbühel to Alpendorf, 212.5 km (132.0 mi)

Stage 5 result
Rank	Rider	Team	Time
1	Ben O'Connor (AUS)	Team Dimension Data	5h 35' 34"
2	Riccardo Zoidl (AUT)	Team Felbermayr–Simplon Wels	+ 11"
3	Pieter Weening (NED)	Roompot–Nederlandse Loterij	+ 1' 40"
4	Giulio Ciccone (ITA)	Italy (national team)	+ 1' 46"
5	Felix Großschartner (AUT)	CCC–Sprandi–Polkowice	+ 1' 46"
6	Delio Fernández (ESP)	Delko–Marseille Provence KTM	+ 1' 58"
7	Patrick Schelling (SUI)	Team Vorarlberg	+ 1' 58"
8	Mekseb Debesay (ERI)	Team Dimension Data	+ 1' 58"
9	Martijn Tusveld (NED)	Roompot–Nederlandse Loterij	+ 2' 02"
10	Stefan Denifl (AUT)	Aqua Blue Sport	+ 2' 02"

General classification after Stage 5
Rank	Rider	Team	Time
1	Stefan Denifl (AUT)	Aqua Blue Sport	22h 40' 46"
2	Delio Fernández (ESP)	Delko–Marseille Provence KTM	+ 37"
3	Miguel Ángel López (COL)	Astana	+ 59"
4	Felix Großschartner (AUT)	CCC–Sprandi–Polkowice	+ 1' 05"
5	Ben O'Connor (AUS)	Team Dimension Data	+ 1' 08"
6	Giulio Ciccone (ITA)	Italy (national team)	+ 2' 06"
7	Daniel Teklehaimanot (ERI)	Team Dimension Data	+ 2' 21"
8	Alexey Rybalkin (RUS)	Gazprom–RusVelo	+ 2' 32"
9	Ángel Madrazo (ESP)	Delko–Marseille Provence KTM	+ 2' 46"
10	Martijn Tusveld (NED)	Roompot–Nederlandse Loterij	+ 2' 50"

=== Stage 6 ===
8 July 2017 — Alpendorf to Wels, 203.9 km (126.7 mi)

Stage 6 result
Rank	Rider	Team	Time
1	Clément Venturini (FRA)	Cofidis	4h 29' 21"
2	Sep Vanmarcke (BEL)	Cannondale–Drapac	+ 0"
3	Ryan Gibbons (RSA)	Team Dimension Data	+ 0"
4	Pim Ligthart (NED)	Roompot–Nederlandse Loterij	+ 0"
5	Ivan Savitskiy (RUS)	Gazprom–RusVelo	+ 0"
6	Davide Ballerini (ITA)	Italy (national team)	+ 0"
7	Oscar Gatto (ITA)	Astana	+ 0"
8	Gian Friesecke (SUI)	Team Vorarlberg	+ 0"
9	Guillaume Boivin (CAN)	Israel Cycling Academy	+ 0"
10	Sven Erik Bystrøm (NOR)	Team Katusha–Alpecin	+ 0"

Final general classification
Rank	Rider	Team	Time
1	Stefan Denifl (AUT)	Aqua Blue Sport	27h 10' 07"
2	Delio Fernández (ESP)	Delko–Marseille Provence KTM	+ 37"
3	Miguel Ángel López (COL)	Astana	+ 59"
4	Felix Großschartner (AUT)	CCC–Sprandi–Polkowice	+ 1' 00"
5	Ben O'Connor (AUS)	Team Dimension Data	+ 1' 08"
6	Giulio Ciccone (ITA)	Italy (national team)	+ 2' 06"
7	Daniel Teklehaimanot (ERI)	Team Dimension Data	+ 2' 21"
8	Alexey Rybalkin (RUS)	Gazprom–RusVelo	+ 2' 32"
9	Ángel Madrazo (ESP)	Delko–Marseille Provence KTM	+ 2' 46"
10	Martijn Tusveld (NED)	Roompot–Nederlandse Loterij	+ 2' 50"

== Classification leadership table ==
In the 2017 Tour of Austria, four jerseys were awarded. The general classification was calculated by adding each cyclist's finishing times on each stage. Time bonuses were awarded to the first three finishers on all stages except the prologue: the stage winner won a ten-second bonus, with six and four seconds for the second and third riders respectively. Bonus seconds were also awarded to the first three riders at intermediate sprints – three seconds for the winner of the sprint, two seconds for the rider in second and one second for the rider in third. The leader of the general classification received a yellow jersey. This classification was considered the most important of the 2017 Tour of Austria, and the winner of the classification was considered the winner of the race.

Points for the mountains classification
Position	1	2	3	4	5
Points for Super-category	15	10	8	6	4
Points for Category 1	12	8	6	4	2
Points for Category 2	8	6	4	0	
Points for Category 3	5	3	1	0	
Points for Category 4	2	1	0	0	

The second jersey represented the mountains classification, marked by a red jersey with white polka dots and yellow trim. Points for this classification were won by the first riders to the top of each categorised climb, with more points available for the higher-categorised climbs. For the hors- and first-category climbs, the top five riders scored points, while the other categories rewarded the top three riders with points.

Additionally, there was a points classification, which awarded a green jersey. In the points classification, cyclists received points for finishing in the top 15 in a stage, with the exception of the opening prologue stage. For winning a stage, a rider earned 15 points, with 12 for second, 10 for third, 8 for fourth with a point fewer per place down to two points for 10th place. Points towards the classification could also be accrued – awarded on a 4–2–1 scale – at intermediate sprint points during each stage; these intermediate sprints also offered bonus seconds towards the general classification as noted above.

The fourth and final jersey represented the classification for Austrian riders, marked by a red jersey. This was decided the same way as the general classification, but only riders born in Austria were eligible to be ranked in the classification. There was also a team classification, in which the times of the best three cyclists per team on each stage were added together; the leading team at the end of the race was the team with the lowest total time.

Stage	Winner	General classification	Mountains classification	Points classification	Austrian rider classification	Team classification
P	Oscar Gatto	Oscar Gatto	Oscar Gatto	Not awarded	Markus Eibegger	Astana
1	Elia Viviani	Sep Vanmarcke	Stephan Rabitsch	Elia Viviani	Markus Eibegger	Cannondale–Drapac
2	Tom-Jelte Slagter	Sep Vanmarcke	Stephan Rabitsch	Sep Vanmarcke	Stephan Rabitsch	Team Dimension Data
3	Elia Viviani	Sep Vanmarcke	Stephan Rabitsch	Elia Viviani	Stephan Rabitsch	Team Dimension Data
4	Miguel Ángel López	Stefan Denifl	Stephan Rabitsch	Elia Viviani	Stefan Denifl	Gazprom–RusVelo
5	Ben O'Connor	Stefan Denifl	Stephan Rabitsch	Elia Viviani	Stefan Denifl	Team Dimension Data
6	Clément Venturini	Stefan Denifl	Pieter Weening	Sep Vanmarcke	Stefan Denifl	Team Dimension Data
Final		Stefan Denifl	Pieter Weening	Sep Vanmarcke	Stefan Denifl	Team Dimension Data
