= 2017 Okolo Slovenska =

2017 Tour of Slovakia
2017 UCI Europe Tour

Race details
- Dates: 7–11 June 2017
- Stages: 4 & Prologue
- Distance: 762.1 km (473.5 mi)
- Winning time: 18h 13' 29"

Results
Jersey awarded to the overall winner	Winner	Jan Tratnik (SLO)	(CCC–Sprandi–Polkowice)
	Second	Mattia Cattaneo (ITA)	(Androni–Sidermec–Bottecchia)
	Third	Piotr Brożyna (POL)	(CCC–Sprandi–Polkowice)
Jersey awarded to the points classification winner	Points	Jan Tratnik (SLO)	(CCC–Sprandi–Polkowice)
Jersey awarded to the mountains classification winner	Mountains	Daniel Turek (CZE)	(NSN Cycling Team)
Jersey awarded to the young rider classification winner	Young rider	Piotr Brożyna (POL)	(CCC–Sprandi–Polkowice)
	Team	Androni–Sidermec–Bottecchia	

The 2017 Okolo Slovenska (transl. 2017 Tour of Slovakia) was a five-day cycling stage race that took place in Slovakia between 7 and 11 June 2017. The race was the 61st edition of the Okolo Slovenska; it was rated as a 2.1 event as part of the 2017 UCI Europe Tour, an upgrade from 2.2 in 2016. The race included four stages and a race-opening prologue individual time trial, starting in Levoča and finishing in Trnava.

The race was won by Slovenian rider Jan Tratnik, riding for the CCC–Sprandi–Polkowice team.

== Schedule ==
The race route was announced on 5 April 2017.

Stage characteristics and winners
Stage	Date	Course	Distance	Type	Winner
P	7 June	Levoča	3.7 km (2.3 mi)	Individual time trial	Jan Tratnik (SLO)
1	8 June	Levoča to Banská Bystrica	211.8 km (132 mi)	Hilly stage	Mihkel Räim (EST)
2	9 June	Banská Bystrica to Nitra	172 km (107 mi)	Mountain stage	Matteo Malucelli (ITA)
3	10 June	Nitra to Trnava	222.1 km (138 mi)	Hilly stage	Matej Mugerli (SLO)
4	11 June	Trnava to Trnava	152.5 km (95 mi)	Intermediate stage	Ivan Savitskiy (RUS)
Total		762.1 km (473.5 mi)			

== Participating teams ==
Twenty-five teams participated in the 2017 edition of the Okolo Slovenska. These included five UCI Professional Continental teams, sixteen UCI Continental teams and four national teams.

UCI Professional Continental teams

- CCC–Sprandi–Polkowice
- Gazprom–RusVelo
- Israel Cycling Academy
- Team Manzana Postobón
- Androni–Sidermec–Bottecchia

UCI Continental teams

- 0711 / Cycling
- Amore & Vita–Selle SMP
- Amplatz–BMC
- Astana City
- Bike Aid
- Dukla Banská Bystrica
- Elkov–Author
- Kolss Cycling Team
- Marlux–Napoleon Games
- Massi–Kuwait Cycling Project
- Meridiana–Kamen
- Monkey Town Continental Team
- Rietumu Banka–Riga
- Synergy Baku
- Unieuro Trevigiani–Hemus 1896
- WSA–Greenlife

National teams

- Czech Republic
- Hungary
- Russia
- Slovakia

== Stages ==
=== Prologue ===
7 June 2017 — Levoča, 3.7 km (2.3 mi), individual time trial (ITT)

Prologue result & General classification after Prologue
Rank	Rider	Team	Time
1	Jan Tratnik (SLO)	CCC–Sprandi–Polkowice	4' 43"
2	Josef Černý (CZE)	Elkov–Author	+ 7"
3	Mattia Cattaneo (ITA)	Androni–Sidermec–Bottecchia	+ 15"
4	Matej Mugerli (SLO)	Amplatz–BMC	+ 19"
5	Piotr Brożyna (POL)	CCC–Sprandi–Polkowice	+ 19"
6	Ricardo Vilela (POR)	Team Manzana Postobón	+ 20"
7	Marcin Białobłocki (POL)	CCC–Sprandi–Polkowice	+ 20"
8	Tomáš Bucháček (CZE)	Elkov–Author	+ 20"
9	František Sisr (CZE)	CCC–Sprandi–Polkowice	+ 20"
10	Marco Frapporti (ITA)	Androni–Sidermec–Bottecchia	+ 21"

=== Stage 1 ===
8 June 2017 — Levoča to Banská Bystrica, 211.8 km (132 mi)

Stage 1 result
Rank	Rider	Team	Time
1	Mihkel Räim (EST)	Israel Cycling Academy	5h 06' 20"
2	Kevin Pauwels (BEL)	Marlux–Napoleon Games	+ 0"
3	Davide Mucelli (ITA)	Meridiana–Kamen	+ 0"
4	Sergio Higuita (COL)	Team Manzana Postobón	+ 0"
5	Dennis van Winden (NED)	Israel Cycling Academy	+ 0"
6	Jan Tratnik (SLO)	CCC–Sprandi–Polkowice	+ 0"
7	Dieter Vanthourenhout (BEL)	Marlux–Napoleon Games	+ 0"
8	Paweł Cieślik (POL)	Elkov–Author	+ 0"
9	Matvey Nikitin (KAZ)	Astana City	+ 0"
10	Ricardo Vilela (POR)	Team Manzana Postobón	+ 0"

General classification after Stage 1
Rank	Rider	Team	Time
1	Jan Tratnik (SLO)	CCC–Sprandi–Polkowice	5h 10' 57"
2	Josef Černý (CZE)	Elkov–Author	+ 13"
3	Mattia Cattaneo (ITA)	Androni–Sidermec–Bottecchia	+ 21"
4	Marco Frapporti (ITA)	Androni–Sidermec–Bottecchia	+ 24"
5	Piotr Brożyna (POL)	CCC–Sprandi–Polkowice	+ 25"
6	Ricardo Vilela (POR)	Team Manzana Postobón	+ 26"
7	Mihkel Räim (EST)	Israel Cycling Academy	+ 26"
8	Tomáš Bucháček (CZE)	Elkov–Author	+ 26"
9	Krists Neilands (LAT)	Israel Cycling Academy	+ 26"
10	Eli Iserbyt (BEL)	Marlux–Napoleon Games	+ 27"

=== Stage 2 ===
9 June 2017 — Banská Bystrica to Nitra, 172 km (107 mi)

Stage 2 result
Rank	Rider	Team	Time
1	Matteo Malucelli (ITA)	Androni–Sidermec–Bottecchia	4h 11' 50"
2	Jan Tratnik (SLO)	CCC–Sprandi–Polkowice	+ 0"
3	Matej Mugerli (SLO)	Amplatz–BMC	+ 0"
4	Marco Benfatto (ITA)	Androni–Sidermec–Bottecchia	+ 0"
5	Zak Dempster (AUS)	Israel Cycling Academy	+ 0"
6	Josef Černý (CZE)	Elkov–Author	+ 0"
7	Marco Zamparella (ITA)	Amore & Vita–Selle SMP	+ 0"
8	Marco Zanotti (ITA)	Monkey Town Continental Team	+ 0"
9	Rok Korošec (SLO)	Amplatz–BMC	+ 0"
10	Ivan Savitskiy (RUS)	Gazprom–RusVelo	+ 0"

General classification after Stage 2
Rank	Rider	Team	Time
1	Jan Tratnik (SLO)	CCC–Sprandi–Polkowice	9h 22' 40"
2	Josef Černý (CZE)	Elkov–Author	+ 20"
3	Ricardo Vilela (POR)	Team Manzana Postobón	+ 28"
4	Mattia Cattaneo (ITA)	Androni–Sidermec–Bottecchia	+ 28"
5	Marco Frapporti (ITA)	Androni–Sidermec–Bottecchia	+ 31"
6	Piotr Brożyna (POL)	CCC–Sprandi–Polkowice	+ 32"
7	Mihkel Räim (EST)	Israel Cycling Academy	+ 33"
8	Tomáš Bucháček (CZE)	Elkov–Author	+ 33"
9	Krists Neilands (LAT)	Israel Cycling Academy	+ 33"
10	Egan Bernal (COL)	Androni–Sidermec–Bottecchia	+ 34"

=== Stage 3 ===
10 June 2017 — Nitra to Trnava, 222.1 km (138 mi)

Stage 3 result
Rank	Rider	Team	Time
1	Matej Mugerli (SLO)	Amplatz–BMC	5h 26' 04"
2	Josef Černý (CZE)	Elkov–Author	+ 7"
3	Jan Tratnik (SLO)	CCC–Sprandi–Polkowice	+ 7"
4	Sergio Higuita (COL)	Team Manzana Postobón	+ 7"
5	Michael Vanthourenhout (BEL)	Marlux–Napoleon Games	+ 7"
6	Peeter Pruus (EST)	Rietumu Banka–Riga	+ 7"
7	Florian Bissinger (GER)	WSA–Greenlife	+ 7"
8	Andriy Kulyk (UKR)	Kolss Cycling Team	+ 7"
9	Jiří Polnický (CZE)	Elkov–Author	+ 7"
10	Ivan Savitskiy (RUS)	Gazprom–RusVelo	+ 7"

General classification after Stage 3
Rank	Rider	Team	Time
1	Jan Tratnik (SLO)	CCC–Sprandi–Polkowice	14h 48' 47"
2	Josef Černý (CZE)	Elkov–Author	+ 17"
3	Ricardo Vilela (POR)	Team Manzana Postobón	+ 32"
4	Mattia Cattaneo (ITA)	Androni–Sidermec–Bottecchia	+ 32"
5	Piotr Brożyna (POL)	CCC–Sprandi–Polkowice	+ 36"
6	Mihkel Räim (EST)	Israel Cycling Academy	+ 37"
7	Tomáš Bucháček (CZE)	Elkov–Author	+ 37"
8	Krists Neilands (LAT)	Israel Cycling Academy	+ 37"
9	Jiří Polnický (CZE)	Elkov–Author	+ 38"
10	Egan Bernal (COL)	Androni–Sidermec–Bottecchia	+ 38"

=== Stage 4 ===
11 June 2017 — Trnava to Trnava, 152.5 km (95 mi)

Stage 4 result
Rank	Rider	Team	Time
1	Ivan Savitskiy (RUS)	Gazprom–RusVelo	3h 24' 42"
2	Rok Korošec (SLO)	Amplatz–BMC	+ 0"
3	Matteo Malucelli (ITA)	Androni–Sidermec–Bottecchia	+ 0"
4	Marco Benfatto (ITA)	Androni–Sidermec–Bottecchia	+ 0"
5	Mihkel Räim (EST)	Israel Cycling Academy	+ 0"
6	Marco Zamparella (ITA)	Amore & Vita–Selle SMP	+ 0"
7	Mattia Viel (ITA)	Unieuro Trevigiani–Hemus 1896	+ 0"
8	José Viejo (ESP)	Unieuro Trevigiani–Hemus 1896	+ 0"
9	Andriy Kulyk (UKR)	Kolss Cycling Team	+ 0"
10	Davide Mucelli (ITA)	Meridiana–Kamen	+ 0"

Final general classification
Rank	Rider	Team	Time
1	Jan Tratnik (SLO)	CCC–Sprandi–Polkowice	18h 13' 29"
2	Mattia Cattaneo (ITA)	Androni–Sidermec–Bottecchia	+ 32"
3	Piotr Brożyna (POL)	CCC–Sprandi–Polkowice	+ 36"
4	Mihkel Räim (EST)	Israel Cycling Academy	+ 37"
5	Tomáš Bucháček (CZE)	Elkov–Author	+ 37"
6	Krists Neilands (LAT)	Israel Cycling Academy	+ 37"
7	Patrik Tybor (SVK)	Dukla Banská Bystrica	+ 38"
8	Andriy Vasylyuk (UKR)	Kolss Cycling Team	+ 38"
9	Florian Bissinger (GER)	WSA–Greenlife	+ 39"
10	Josef Černý (CZE)	Elkov–Author	+ 39"

== Classification leadership table ==
In the 2017 Tour of Slovakia, five different jerseys were awarded. The general classification was calculated by adding each cyclist's finishing times on each stage, and allowing time bonuses for the first three finishers at intermediate sprints (three seconds to first, two seconds to second and one second to third) and at the finish of mass-start stages; these were awarded to the first three finishers on all stages: the stage winner won a ten-second bonus, with six and four seconds for the second and third riders respectively. The leader of the classification received a yellow jersey; it was considered the most important of the 2017 Tour of Slovakia, and the winner of the classification was considered the winner of the race.

Points for the mountains classification
Position	1	2	3
Points for Category 1	6	4	2
Points for Category 2	3	2	1

There was also a mountains classification, the leadership of which was marked by a white jersey with red polka dots. In the mountains classification, points towards the classification were won by reaching the top of a climb before other cyclists. Each climb was categorised as either first, or third-category, with more points available for the higher-categorised climbs; however points were awarded to the top three riders in both categories.

Points for the points classification
Position	1	2	3	4	5	6	7	8	9	10
Stage finishes	10	9	8	7	6	5	4	3	2	1
Intermediate sprints	3	2	1	0						

Additionally, there was a points classification, which awarded a white jersey with blue polka dots. In the points classification, cyclists received points for finishing in the top 10 in a stage, with the exception of the prologue. For winning a stage, a rider earned 10 points, with 9 for second, 8 for third and so on, down to 1 point for 10th place. Points towards the classification could also be accrued – awarded on a 3–2–1 scale – at intermediate sprint points during each stage; these intermediate sprints also offered bonus seconds towards the general classification as noted above.

The fourth jersey represented the classification for young riders, marked by a white jersey. This was decided the same way as the general classification, but only riders born after 1 January 1995 were eligible to be ranked in the classification. The fifth and final jersey represented the classification for Slovak riders, marked by a white, blue and red jersey. This was decided the same way as the general classification, but only riders born in Slovakia were eligible to be ranked in the classification. There was also a team classification, in which the times of the best three cyclists per team on each stage were added together; the leading team at the end of the race was the team with the lowest total time.

Stage	Winner	General classification	Points classification	Mountains classification	Young rider classification	Slovak rider classification	Team classification
P	Jan Tratnik	Jan Tratnik	Not awarded	Not awarded	Piotr Brożyna	Patrik Tybor	CCC–Sprandi–Polkowice
1	Mihkel Räim	Jan Tratnik	Jan Tratnik	Daniel Turek	Piotr Brożyna	Patrik Tybor	Elkov–Author
2	Matteo Malucelli	Jan Tratnik	Jan Tratnik	Daniel Turek	Piotr Brożyna	Patrik Tybor	Elkov–Author
3	Matej Mugerli	Jan Tratnik	Jan Tratnik	Daniel Turek	Piotr Brożyna	Patrik Tybor	Elkov–Author
4	Ivan Savitskiy	Jan Tratnik	Jan Tratnik	Daniel Turek	Piotr Brożyna	Patrik Tybor	Androni–Sidermec–Bottecchia
Final		Jan Tratnik	Jan Tratnik	Daniel Turek	Piotr Brożyna	Patrik Tybor	Androni–Sidermec–Bottecchia
