= Daniel Turek =

Czech cyclist

Personal information
- Full name: Daniel Turek
- Born: 19 January 1993 (age 33) Lanškroun, Czech Republic
- Height: 1.83 m (6 ft 0 in)
- Weight: 72 kg (159 lb)

Cycling career
- Sport: Cycling
- Current team: ATT Investments
- Discipline: Road
- Role: Rider

Amateur team
- 2012–2014: TJ Favorit Brno

Professional teams
- 2015–2019: Cycling Academy
- 2020: Israel Cycling Academy
- 2021–2022: Team Felbermayr–Simplon Wels
- 2023–: ATT Investments

Daniel Turek (born 19 January 1993 in Lanškroun) is a Czech cyclist, who currently rides for UCI Continental team ATT Investments.

== Major results ==
2010
1st Time trial, National Junior Road Championships
2012
3rd Time trial, National Under-23 Road Championships
2013
10th Overall Carpathian Couriers Race
2014
2nd Road race, National Under-23 Road Championships
6th Tour Bohemia
8th Overall Carpathian Couriers Race
10th GP Czech Republic
2015
1st Stage 4 Tour d'Azerbaïdjan
1st Stage 1 Tour de Berlin
2nd Road race, National Under-23 Road Championships
2016
3rd Overall Tour de Hongrie
5th Overall Sibiu Cycling Tour

1st Mountains classification

5th Overall Tour de Beauce
5th Poreč Trophy
7th GP Kranj
8th Overall Grand Prix Cycliste de Saguenay
2017
1st Mountains classification, Okolo Slovenska
4th Gran Premio di Lugano
2018
8th Overall Tour of Taihu Lake
10th Overall Czech Cycling Tour
2019
1st Mountains classification, Vuelta a Asturias
8th Overall Tour of Norway
9th Overall Tour of Taihu Lake
2020
2nd Overall Dookoła Mazowsza
5th Time trial, National Road Championships
5th Overall Bałtyk–Karkonosze Tour
9th Overall Course de Solidarność et des Champions Olympiques
2021
1st Mountains classification Sibiu Cycling Tour
1st Stage 1 Oberösterreich Rundfahrt
1st Stage 3 Circuit des Ardennes
2nd GP Czech Republic
3rd Road race, National Road Championships
6th International Rhodes Grand Prix
7th Overall International Tour of Rhodes
9th Overall À travers les Hauts-de-France
2022
1st Mountains classification, Tour of Antalya
2023
4th Time trial, National Road Championships
8th Overall International Tour of Hellas
9th Overall South Aegean Tour
2024
6th Overall Tour de Bretagne
10th GP Czech Republic
