= Maloja Pushbikers =

German cycling team

Team information
- UCI code: PBS
- Registered: Germany
- Founded: 2014
- Disciplines: Road; Track
- Status: Club (2014–2017); UCI Continental (2018); Club (2019); UCI Continental (2020-)
- Bicycles: Fuji (2014–2019); Wiawis (2020–2023); Argon 18 (2024–2027)
- Components: SRAM, FSA
- Website: Team home page

Key personnel
- General manager: Christian Grasmann
- Team managers: Gregor Pavlic; Alex Kastenhuber; Marko Hladnik

Team name history
- 2014–2017 2018 2019-: Maloja Pushbikers; WSA Pushbikers; Maloja Pushbikers
Maloja Pushbikers jersey
Jersey

Maloja Pushbikers (UCI Code: PBS) is a German professional cycling team founded in 2014 around team manager Christian Grasmann.

Grasmann, who was also active as a cyclist until the end of 2018, initially focused on track cycling before the organization cooperated with an Austrian UCI Continental team in road cycling in 2018 under the name WSA Pushbikers. In 2019, the team split and the Austrian team continued to ride under the name WSA KTM Graz. In 2020, the squad became a UCI Continental team for the first time in its current form.

Its title sponsor, Maloja, is a German clothing manufacturer, specialising in outdoor sports.

== Team roster ==
As of 10 January 2024.

Rider	Date of birth
Max Benz-Kuch (GER)	24 October 2000 (age 25)
Wolfgang Brandl (GER)	12 March 1986 (age 40)
Roy Eefting (NED)	4 September 1989 (age 37)
Filippo Fortin (ITA)	1 February 1989 (age 37)
Claudio Imhof (CH)	26 September 1990 (age 35)
Moritz Malcharek (GER)	29 July 1997 (age 29)
Matias Malmberg (DEN)	31 August 2000 (age 26)

Rider	Date of birth
Martin Meiler (GER)	19 March 1998 (age 28)
Felix James Meo (NZL)	3 April 1997 (age 29)
Patrick Reißig (GER)	3 June 1994 (age 32)
Daniel Schrag (GER)	3 April 2003 (age 23)
Fabian Steininger (AUT)	12 September 2000 (age 25)
Philip Weber (GER)	24 July 1998 (age 28)
Jermaine Zemke (GER)	29 August 2005 (age 21)

== Major wins ==
2018
Stage 2b (ITT) Tour of Bihor, Jodok Salzmann
GP Kranj, Daniel Auer
2019
Stage 3b Cycling Tour of Szeklerland, Felix Ritzinger
V4 Special Series Vasarosnameny - Nyiregyhaza, Daniel Auer
Prologue Oberösterreichrundfahrt, Lukas Schlemmer
2022
Stage 2 Belgrade Banjaluka, Filippo Fortin
2023
Stage 1 In the footsteps of the Romans, Filippo Fortin
Stage 2 In the footsteps of the Romans, Filippo Fortin
Overall In the footsteps of the Romans, Filippo Fortin
Stage 1a Tour of Bulgaria, Filippo Fortin
Stage 1 Tour of Estonia, Filippo Fortin
Stage 3 Belgrade Banjaluka, Filippo Fortin
Stage 1 Tour de Taiwan, Roy Eefting
