= Florian Bissinger =

German bicycle racer

Personal information
- Full name: Florian Bissinger
- Born: 30 January 1988 (age 38) Munich, Germany

Cycling career
- Sport: Cycling
- Current team: Retired
- Discipline: Road
- Role: Rider

Amateur teams
- 2004–2009: RSV Rosenheim
- 2010: RSV Irschenberg

Professional teams
- 2011: Arbö–Gebrüder Weiss–Oberndorfer
- 2012–2013: Team Vorarlberg
- 2014–2017: WSA–Greenlife

Florian Bissinger (born 30 January 1988 in Munich) is a German former cyclist, who rode professionally between 2011 and 2017 for the Arbö–Gebrüder Weiss–Oberndorfer, Team Vorarlberg and WSA–Greenlife teams.

== Major results ==
2011
1st Overall Tour of Szeklerland

1st Stage 2

6th Raiffeisen Grand Prix
8th Overall Tour of Greece
8th Overall Oberösterreich Rundfahrt
8th Ljubljana–Zagreb
10th Scandinavian Race Uppsala
10th Jūrmala Grand Prix
2012
3rd Paris–Mantes-en-Yvelines
4th Ljubljana–Zagreb
2013
5th Overall Oberösterreich Rundfahrt

1st Stage 1

8th Grand Prix de la ville de Nogent-sur-Oise
2014
3rd Central European Tour Košice–Miskolc
4th Raiffeisen Grand Prix
6th Central European Tour Budapest GP
10th Banja Luka–Belgrade II
2015
3rd Raiffeisen Grand Prix
4th Rund um Sebnitz
5th Visegrad 4 Bicycle Race GP Czech Republic
6th Croatia–Slovenia
10th Overall Tour of Szeklerland
2016
4th Overall Okolo Slovenska
4th Overall Tour of Szeklerland
7th Overall East Bohemia Tour
8th Overall Tour of Bihor

1st Prologue

10th Poreč Trophy
2017
6th Overall Tour of Bihor
9th Overall Okolo Slovenska
