= Brożyna =

Brożyna is a Polish surname. Notable people with the surname include:

- Tomasz Brożyna (born 1970), Polish cyclist
- Piotr Brożyna (born 1995), Polish cyclist, son of Tomasz
