= Helmut Trettwer =

German cyclist

Personal information
- Full name: Helmut Trettwer
- Born: 29 September 1983 (age 43)

Cycling career
- Sport: Cycling
- Current team: Retired
- Discipline: Road
- Role: Rider

Amateur teams
- 2006–2007: RSV Götting-Bruckmühl
- 2008–2009: RSV 1948 Traunstein
- 2008–2009: Herbalife–Focus
- 2010–2012: Team Baier Landshut
- 2011: A:xus–Bikemoments.com
- 2013–2014: RSV Irschenberg
- 2013: Rudy Project Racing Team
- 2014: Maloja Pushbikers
- 2015: Team Baier Landshut

Professional teams
- 2016–2019: WSA–Greenlife
- 2020–2021: Maloja Pushbikers

Helmut Trettwer (born 29 September 1983) is a German former racing cyclist. He rode for WSA–Pushbikers in the men's team time trial event at the 2018 UCI Road World Championships.

== Major results ==
2014
3rd Harlem Skyscraper Classic
2016
1st Mountains classification, Okolo Slovenska
3rd Grand Prix Vorarlberg
3rd Burgenland Rundfahrt
7th Grand Prix Poland
2017
8th Croatia–Slovenia
2018
3rd Grand Prix Vorarlberg
2019
3rd Grand Prix Vorarlberg
