= Markus Eibegger =

Austrian racing cyclist

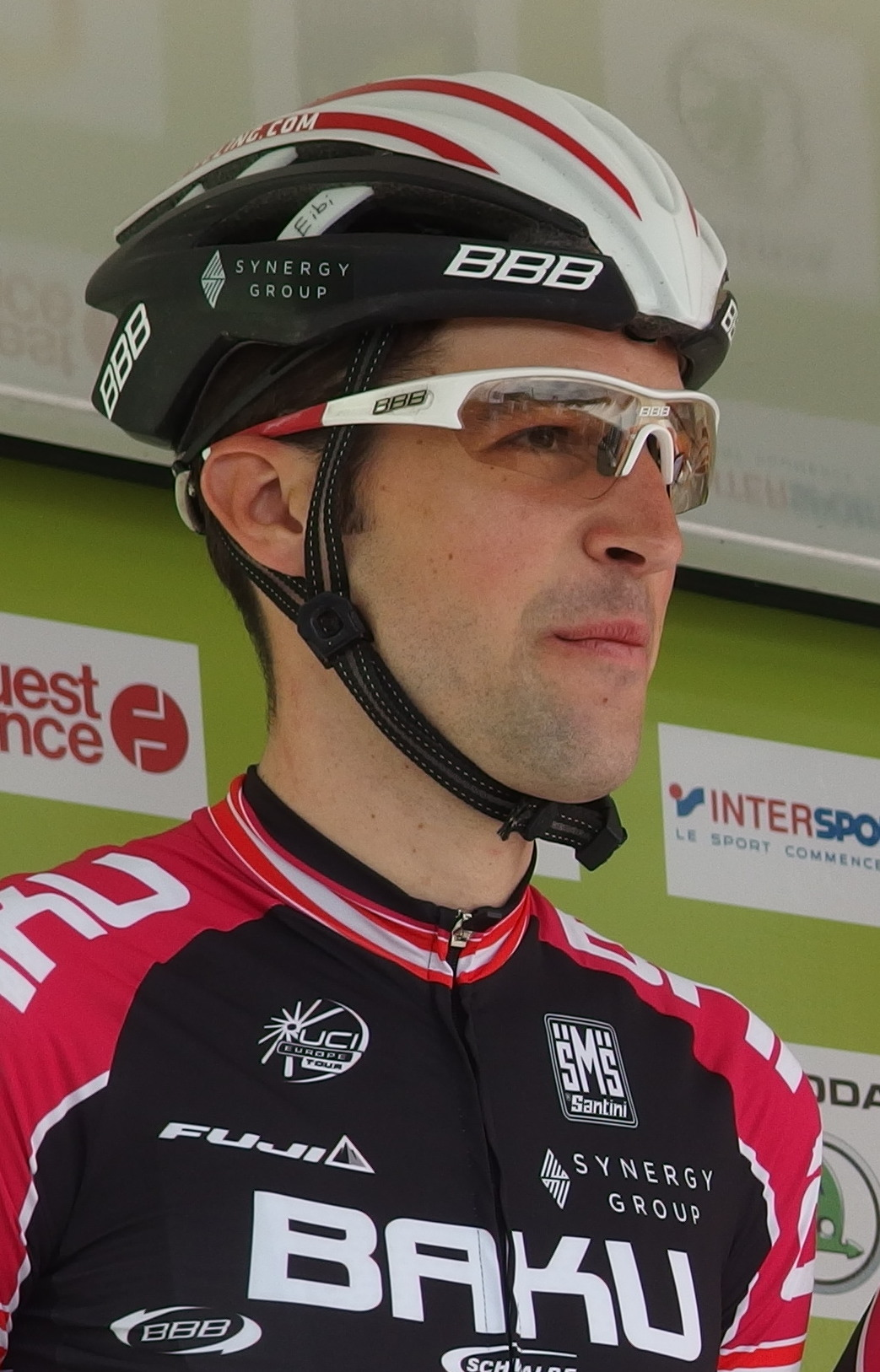

Personal information
- Full name: Markus Eibegger
- Born: 16 October 1984 (age 41) Austria

Cycling career
- Sport: Cycling
- Current team: Retired
- Discipline: Road
- Role: Rider

Professional teams
- 2007–2009: Elk Haus–Simplon
- 2010: Footon–Servetto–Fuji
- 2011: Tabriz Petrochemical Team
- 2012–2013: RC Arbö–Wels–Gourmetfein
- 2014–2015: Synergy Baku
- 2016–2018: Team Felbermayr–Simplon Wels

Major wins
- One-day races and Classics National Road Race Championships (2009)

Markus Eibegger (born 16 October 1984) is an Austrian former professional road bicycle racer, who rode professionally between 2007 and 2018. He was the winner of the Austrian National Road Race Championships in 2009.

== Major results ==
2005
5th Overall Jadranska Magistrala
9th GP Judendorf-Strassengel
2006
1st Overall Grand Prix Guillaume Tell
1st Salzkammergut-Giro
4th Overall Thüringen Rundfahrt der U23
2007
1st Giro di Festina
2nd Road race, National Road Championships
3rd Overall Route du Sud
4th GP Triberg-Schwarzwald
9th Overall Settimana Ciclistica Lombarda
2009
1st Road race, National Road Championships
1st GP Judendorf-Strassengel
1st Stage 2 Istrian Spring Trophy
5th Overall Bayern–Rundfahrt

1st Stage 2

2010
2nd Raiffeisen Grand Prix
6th Overall Tour de Langkawi
2011
1st Overall Tour de Taiwan

1st Stage 4

2nd Overall Tour de Korea
4th Overall Kerman Tour
4th Overall Oberösterreich Rundfahrt

1st Stage 3

8th Overall Jelajah Malaysia
2012
1st Overall Istrian Spring Trophy

1st Stage 2

7th Trofeo Zsšdi
8th Ljubljana–Zagreb
10th Overall Tour of Szeklerland

1st Stage 1

2013
1st Stage 2 Sibiu Cycling Tour
2nd Overall Circuit des Ardennes
2nd Overall Oberösterreich Rundfahrt
2nd Banja Luka–Beograd II
6th Grand Prix Südkärnten
9th Raiffeisen Grand Prix
2014
An Post Rás

1st Mountains classification
1st Stage 6

1st Stage 4 Tour de Bretagne
3rd Grand Prix Südkärnten
3rd Raiffeisen Grand Prix
6th Overall Tour de Taiwan
2015
1st Overall Istrian Spring Trophy

1st Stage 2

5th Odessa Grand Prix II
9th Tour of Almaty
2016
1st Overall Tour d'Azerbaïdjan
1st Stage 1 Istrian Spring Trophy
2nd GP Izola
3rd Overall Oberösterreich Rundfahrt

1st Points classification
1st Stage 3

5th Overall Rhône-Alpes Isère Tour
6th Poreč Trophy
7th Overall Tour of Austria
8th Overall Tour of Croatia
9th Overall Circuit des Ardennes
10th Overall Okolo Slovenska

1st Stage 3

2017
3rd Overall Oberösterreich Rundfahrt
3rd GP Kranj
10th Overall Rhône-Alpes Isère Tour
2018
4th Overall Rhône-Alpes Isère Tour
6th Overall Istrian Spring Trophy
7th GP Laguna
