= Klein Constantia (cycling team) =

Cycling team

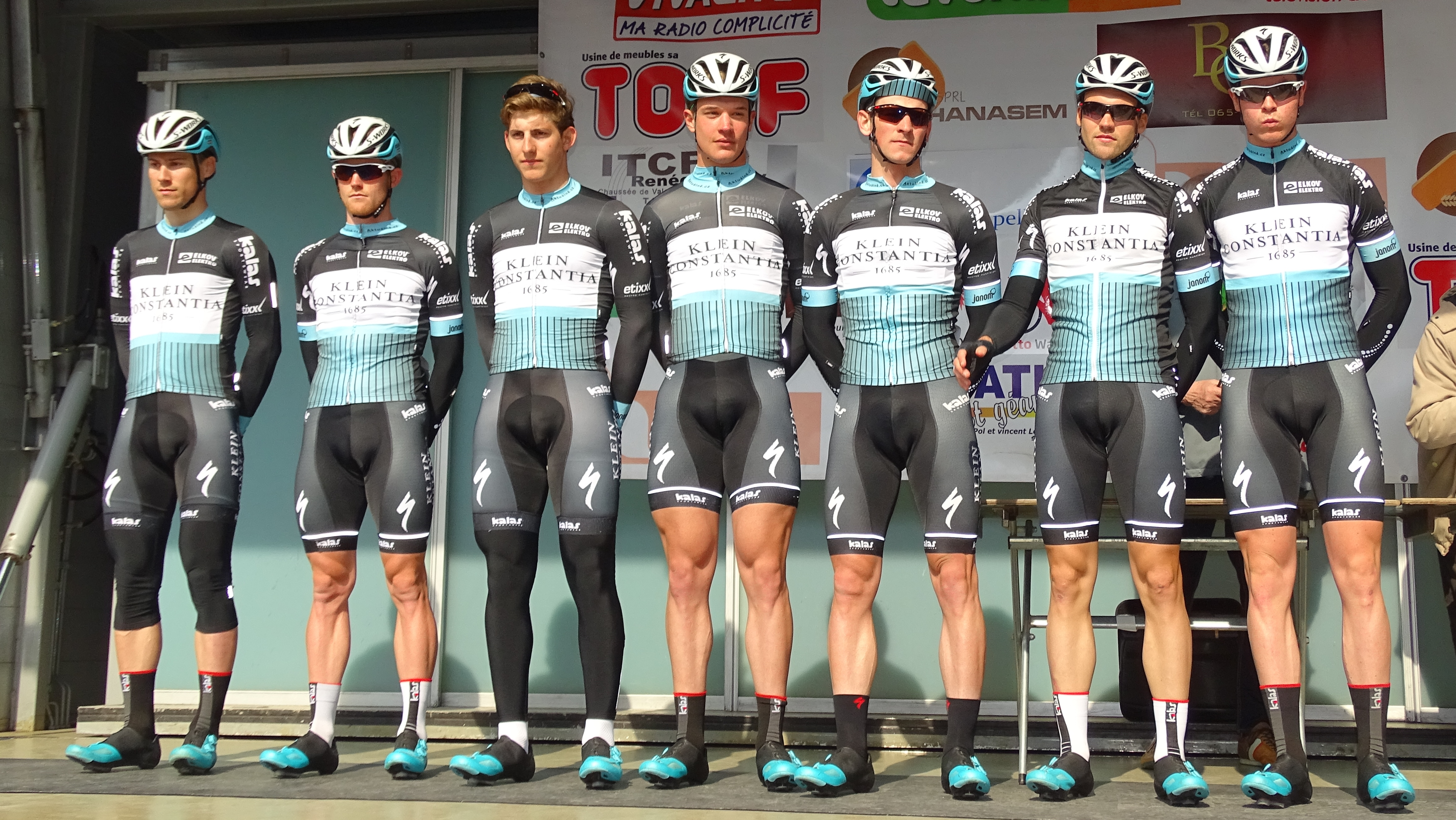

Team information
- UCI code: KLC
- Registered: Czech Republic
- Founded: 2013
- Disbanded: 2016
- Discipline: Road
- Status: Continental

Key personnel
- General manager: Petr Kováč

Team name history
- 2013 2014 2015 2016: Etixx–IHNed; Etixx; AWT Greenway; Klein Constantia

Klein Constantia (UCI team code: KLC) was a UCI Continental cycling team based in the Czech Republic and a development squad for UCI World Tour team Etixx–Quick-Step. It was set up by Patrick Lefevere in 2013.

The team was initially sponsored by Etixx, Belgian producer of supplements and nutrition products, owned by Omega Pharma, and iHNed.cz, Czech news portal, operated by Economia, Czech media company owned by Zdeněk Bakala, who owns Etixx–Quick-Step team. In 2014 Etixx became only sponsor. Since season 2015 Advanced World Transport, Czech transport company, owned by Bakala, and Slovak electric vehicle charging company, took over as title sponsors. The squad has been rebuilt with only two riders staying on board and 10 new young joining the team. In 2016, the South African wine making company Klein Constantia, owned by Zdeněk Bakala, became title sponsor.

== Team roster ==
As of 2 March 2016.

| Rider | Date of birth |
|---|---|
| Nuno Bico (POR) | 3 July 1994 (age 32) |
| Jonas Bokeloh (GER) | 16 March 1996 (age 30) |
| Rémi Cavagna (FRA) | 10 August 1995 (age 31) |
| Iván García Cortina (ESP) | 20 November 1995 (age 31) |
| Przemysław Kasperkiewicz (POL) | 1 March 1994 (age 32) |
| Roman Lehký (CZE) | 30 June 1996 (age 30) |
| Enric Mas (ESP) | 7 January 1995 (age 31) |

| Rider | Date of birth |
|---|---|
| Kenny Molly (BEL) | 24 December 1996 (age 29) |
| Jhonatan Narváez (ECU) | 4 March 1997 (age 29) |
| Maximilian Schachmann (GER) | 9 January 1994 (age 32) |
| Michal Schlegel (CZE) | 31 May 1995 (age 31) |
| Hamish Schreurs (NZL) | 23 January 1994 (age 32) |
| František Sisr (CZE) | 17 March 1993 (age 33) |

== Major wins ==
2013
France U23 National Cyclo-cross Championships, Julian Alaphilippe
Stage 1 Boucle de l'Artois, Louis Verhelst
Stage 1 Circuit des Ardennes, Louis Verhelst
Stage 1 Tour de Bretagne, Louis Verhelst
Stage 4 Tour de Bretagne, Julian Alaphilippe
Grand Prix Südkärnten, Julian Alaphilippe
Overall Okolo Slovenska, Petr Vakoč
Stage 1 Thüringen Rundfahrt der U23, Łukasz Wiśniowski
Stage 3 Thüringen Rundfahrt der U23, Julian Alaphilippe
Poland U23 National Road Race Championships, Łukasz Wiśniowski
Poland U23 National Time Trial Championships, Łukasz Wiśniowski
Overall Vuelta a la Comunidad de Madrid Sub 23, Petr Vakoč

Stage 1, Petr Vakoč

Stage 4 Czech Cycling Tour, Petr Vakoč
Memoriał Henryka Łasaka, Florian Sénéchal
Grand Prix Královéhradeckého kraje, Petr Vakoč
Overall Okolo Jižních Čech, Florian Sénéchal

Stage 2, Florian Sénéchal

2014
Kattekoers, Łukasz Wiśniowski
Stage 4 Tour de Normandie, Łukasz Wiśniowski
Stage 4 Volta ao Alentejo, Karel Hník
Overall Circuit des Ardennes, Łukasz Wiśniowski
Stage 5 Tour de Bretagne, Daniel Hoelgaard
Overall Course de la Paix U23, Samuel Spokes

Stages 2 & 3, Samuel Spokes

Stage 2 Ronde de l'Oise, Daniel Hoelgaard
Netherlands U23 National Road Race Championships, Tim Kerkhof
Stage 3 Troféu Joaquim Agostinho, Karel Hník
Stage 3 Czech Cycling Tour, Jan Hirt
Overall Tour Alsace, Karel Hník

Stage 4, Karel Hník

Stages 1 & 4 Okolo Jižních Čech, Daniel Hoelgaard
2015
Prologue Carpathian Couriers Race, Jan Brockhoff
Stage 4 Carpathian Couriers Race, Erik Baška
Stage 3 Tour de Berlin, Erik Baška
Slovakia U23 National Time Trial Championships, Erik Baška
Slovakia U23 National Road Race Championships, Erik Baška
Puchar Ministra Obrony Narodowej, Erik Baška
2016
New Zealand U23 National Road Race Championships, Hamish Schreurs
Trofej Umag, Jonas Bokeloh
Overall Volta ao Alentejo, Enric Mas

Stage 2, Enric Mas
Stage 5, Rémi Cavagna

Stage 1 Circuit des Ardennes, Rémi Cavagna
Stage 1 Tour de Bretagne, František Sisr
Overall Carpathian Couriers Race, Hamish Schreurs

Prologue & Stage 3, Hamish Schreurs

Overall Tour de Berlin, Rémi Cavagna

Stage 3a (ITT), Rémi Cavagna

Ecuador U23 National Time Trial Championships, Jhonatan Narváez
Stage 3 Paris–Arras Tour, Rémi Cavagna
Overall Tour de Savoie Mont-Blanc, Enric Mas
Czech Republic U23 National Time Trial Championships, Michal Schlegel
Germany U23 National Time Trial Championships, Max Schachmann
Stage 4 Course de Solidarność et des Champions Olympiques, Iván García Cortina
Stage 3 Giro della Valle d'Aosta, Max Schachmann
Overall Tour Alsace, Max Schachmann

Stage 3, Max Schachmann

France U23 National Time Trial Championships, Rémi Cavagna
Stage 1 East Bohemia Tour, František Sisr

== National champions ==
2013
France U23 Cyclo-cross, Julian Alaphilippe
Poland U23 Road Race, Łukasz Wiśniowski
Poland U23 Time Trial, Łukasz Wiśniowski
2014
Netherlands U23 Road Race, Tim Kerkhof
2015
Slovakia U23 Time Trial, Erik Baška
Slovakia U23 Road Race, Erik Baška
2016
New Zealand U23 Road Race, Hamish Schreurs
Ecuador U23 Time Trial, Jhonatan Narváez
Czech U23 Time Trial, Michal Schlegel
Germany U23 Time Trial, Maximilian Schachmann
France U23 Time Trial, Rémi Cavagna
