= Hamish Schreurs =

New Zealand cyclist (born 1994)

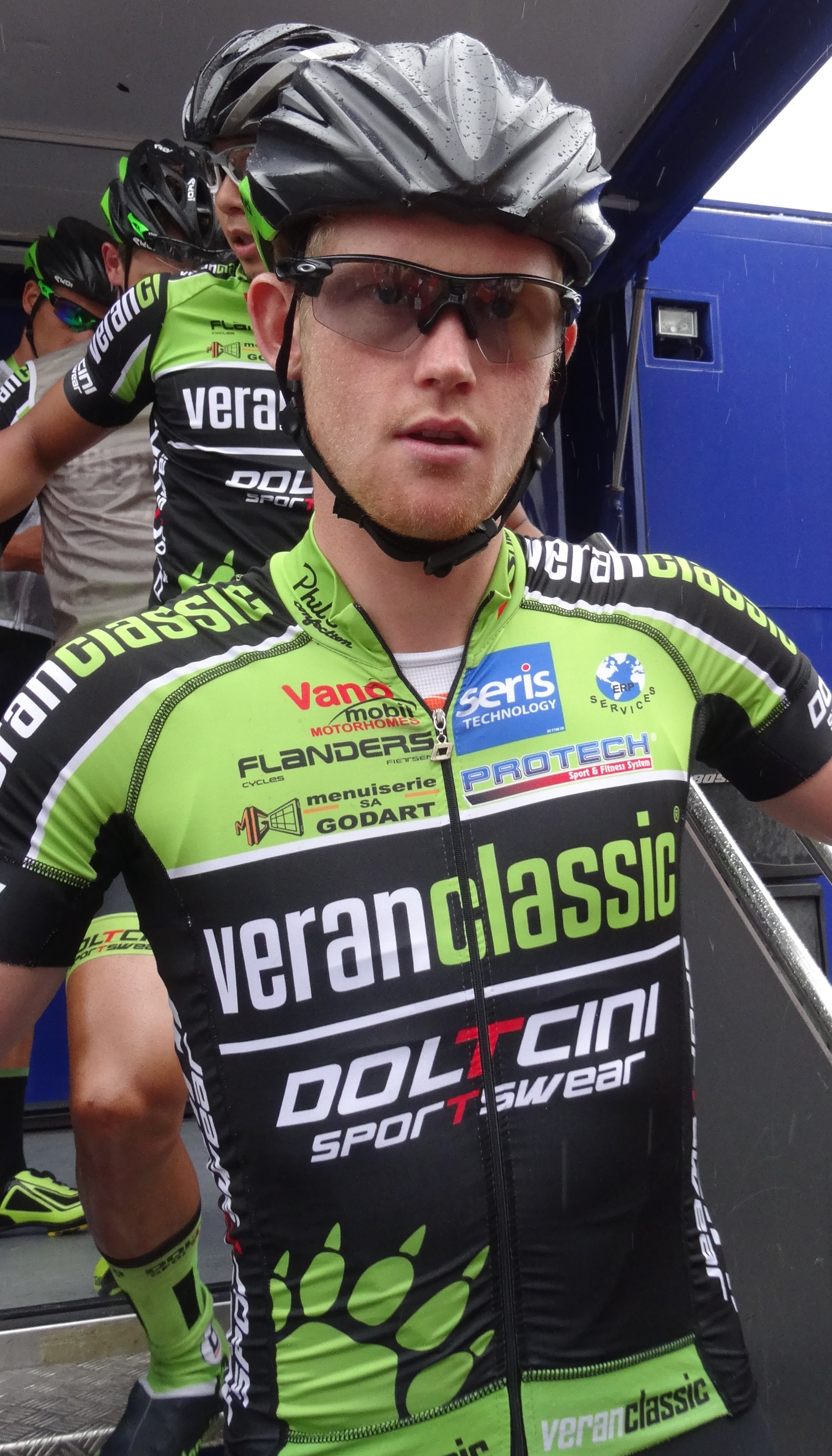
- Schreurs in 2014

Personal information
- Full name: Hamish Schreurs
- Born: 23 January 1994 (age 32) Christchurch, New Zealand
- Height: 1.77 m (5 ft 10 in)
- Weight: 69 kg (152 lb)

Cycling career
- Sport: Cycling
- Discipline: Road
- Role: Rider

Amateur teams
- 2011–2013: Benchmark Homes
- 2015: Sojasun espoir–ACNC

Professional teams
- 2014: Veranclassic–Doltcini
- 2016: Klein Constantia
- 2016: Etixx–Quick-Step (stagiaire)
- 2017–2019: Israel Cycling Academy

Hamish Schreurs (born 23 January 1994) is a New Zealand cyclist, who last rode for UCI Professional Continental team Israel Cycling Academy.

== Major results ==
2015
1st Road race, National Under-23 Road Championships
2016
National Road Championships

1st Under-23 road race
3rd Road race
3rd Under-23 time trial

1st Overall Carpathian Couriers Race

1st Points classification
1st Sprints classification
1st Prologue & Stage 3

3rd Paris–Roubaix Espoirs
5th Overall Okolo Slovenska

1st Young rider classification
