= Matthias Reutimann =

Swiss cyclist

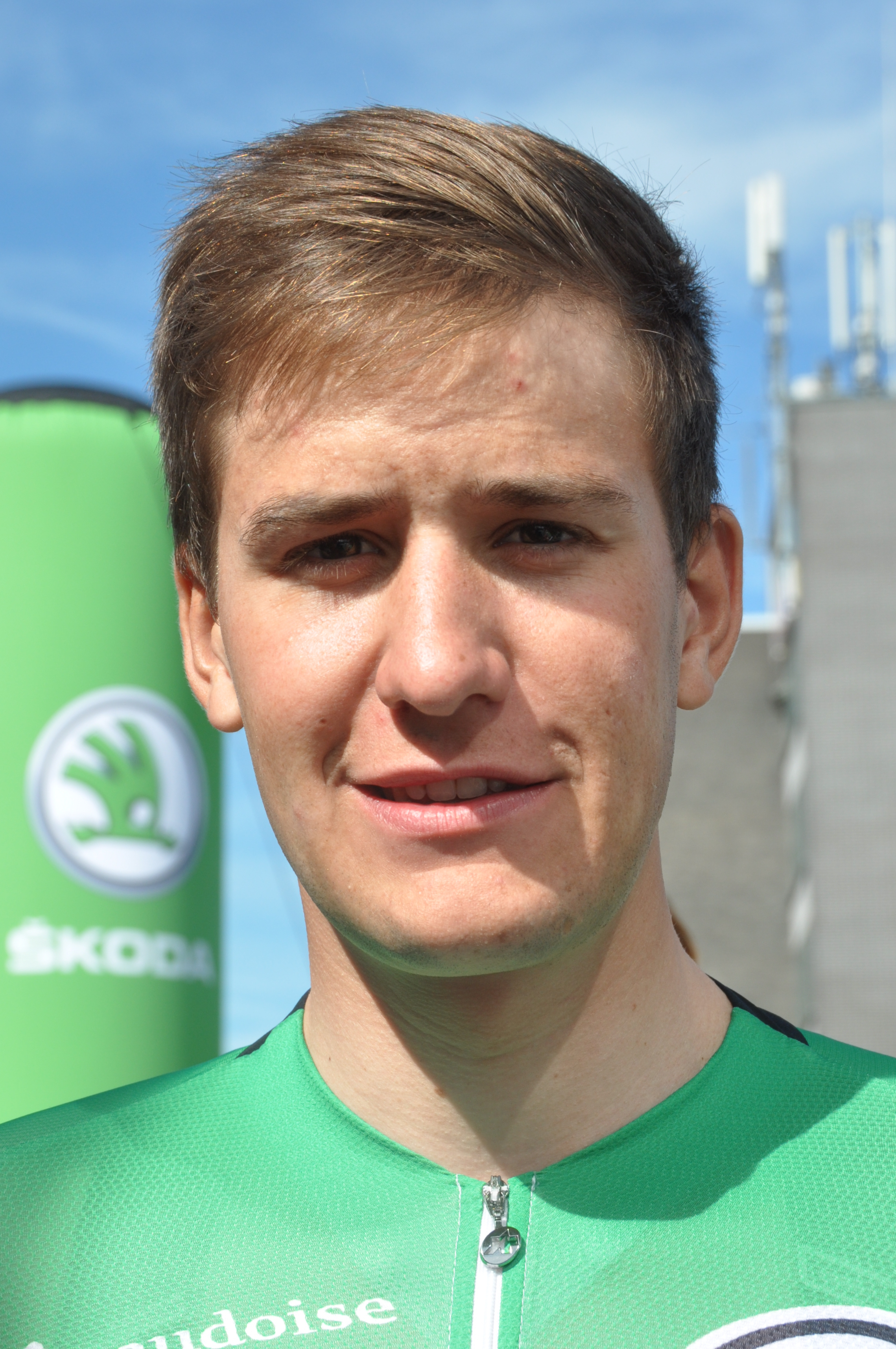
- Reutimann at the 2017 Rund um Köln

Personal information
- Born: 15 November 1994 (age 31) Winterthur, Switzerland
- Height: 1.85 m (6 ft 1 in)
- Weight: 71 kg (157 lb)

Cycling career
- Sport: Cycling
- Current team: Team Felt–Felbermayr
- Discipline: Road
- Role: Rider

Amateur teams
- 2014–2016: VC Mendrisio-PL Valli
- 2018: Swiss Racing Academy

Professional teams
- 2017: Roth–Akros
- 2019–2021: Swiss Racing Academy
- 2022: Team Vorarlberg
- 2023–: Team Felbermayr–Simplon Wels

Matthias Reutimann (born 15 November 1994) is a Swiss cyclist, who currently rides for UCI Continental team Team Felt–Felbermayr. He was selected to compete in the 2021 Tour de Romandie with the Swiss national team.

== Major results ==
2016
1st Coppa d'Inverno
2017
1st Mountains classification, International Tour of Rhodes
2018
1st Hill-climb, National Road Championships
9th Memorial Philippe Van Coningsloo
2019
2nd Hill-climb, National Road Championships
2020
6th Road race, National Road Championships
