= Rupert Probst =

Austrian cyclist

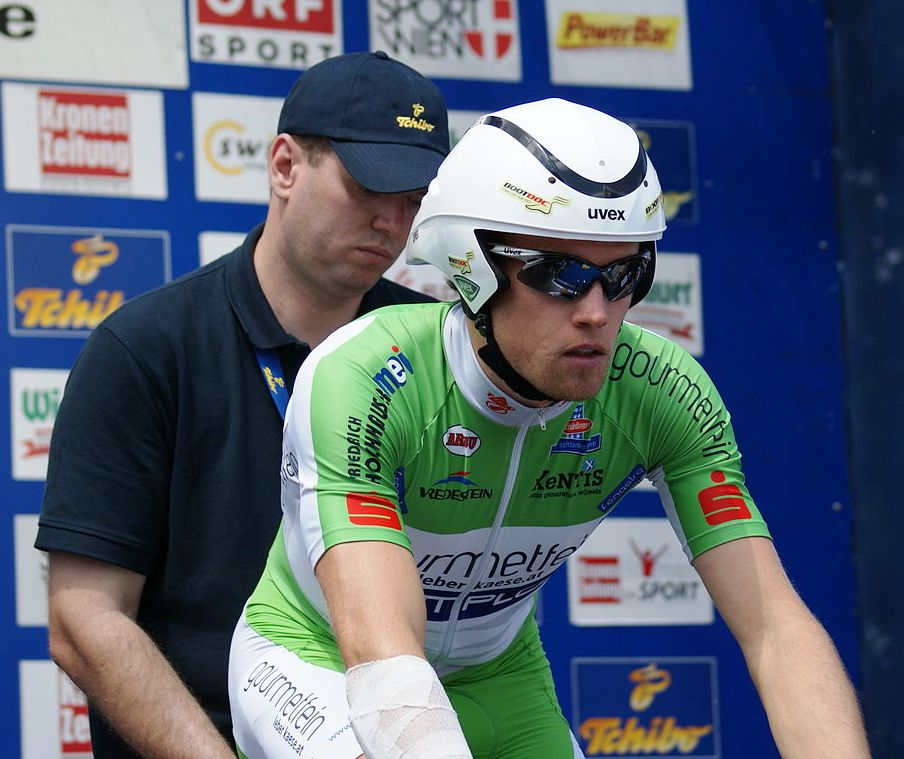

Personal information
- Born: 30 July 1981 (age 45) Oberndorf bei Salzburg, Austria

Cycling career
- Sport: Cycling
- Current team: Retired
- Discipline: Road
- Role: Rider

Professional teams
- 2004: RC Bikepalast.com Salzburg
- 2007: RC Arbö–Resch & Frisch–Gourmetfein–Wels
- 2008: Arbö–KTM–Junkers
- 2009–2010: RC Arbö–Wels–Gourmetfein
- 2011–2012: Arbö–Gebrüder Weiss–Oberndorfer

Rupert Probst (born 30 July 1981) is an Austrian former road cyclist.

== Major results ==
2007
1st National Time Trial Championships
5th National Road Race Championships
2009
3rd GP Kooperativa
7th Rund um Köln
7th Raiffeisen Grand Prix
2010
4th National Road Race Championships
6th Raiffeisen Grand Prix
