= Lukas Schlemmer =

Austrian cyclist

Personal information
- Full name: Lukas Schlemmer
- Born: 5 March 1995 (age 31)

Cycling career
- Sport: Cycling
- Discipline: Road
- Role: Rider

Professional teams
- 2014–2016: WSA–Greenlife
- 2017–2018: Team Felbermayr–Simplon Wels
- 2019–2020: Maloja Pushbikers

Lukas Schlemmer (born 5 March 1995) is an Austrian cyclist, who most recently rode for UCI Continental team WSA KTM Graz.

== Major results ==
2014
8th GP Polski
2016
1st Mountains classification Tour of Szeklerland
1st Stage 2 Tour de Berlin
2017
1st Road race, National Under-23 Road Championships
5th GP Izola
2018
1st Stage 2 Szlakiem Walk Majora Hubala
2nd GP Laguna
2019
1st Prologue Oberösterreich Rundfahrt
