= Pöggstall =

- Municipality
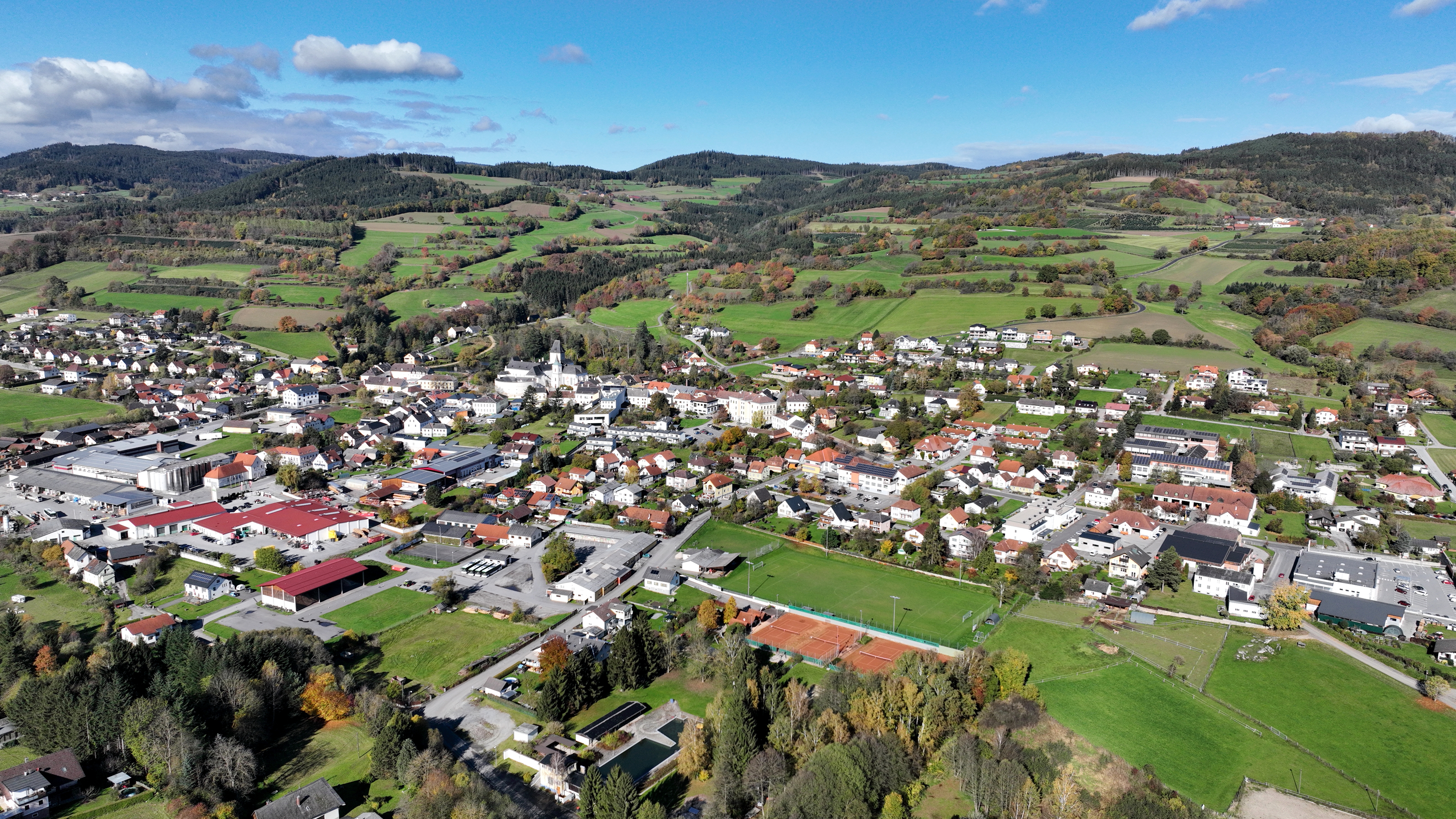
- Southeast view of Pöggstall

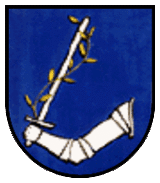
- Coat of arms

- Location within Austria
- Coordinates: 48°19′N 15°12′E
- Country: Austria
- State: Lower Austria
- District: Melk

Government
  - Mayor: Johann Killinger

Area
  - Total: 58.92 km^{2} (22.75 sq mi)
- Elevation: 462 m (1,516 ft)

Population (2018-01-01)
  - Total: 2,435
  - Density: 41.33/km^{2} (107.0/sq mi)
- Time zone: UTC+1 (CET)
  - Summer (DST): UTC+2 (CEST)
- Postal code: 3650
- Area code: 02758
- Website: www.poeggstall.at

Pöggstall is a town in the district of Melk in the Austrian state of Lower Austria.

== Population ==
Historical population
Year	Pop.	±%
1971	2,912	—
1981	2,892	−0.7%
1991	2,732	−5.5%
2001	2,594	−5.1%
