= František Sisr =

Czech cyclist

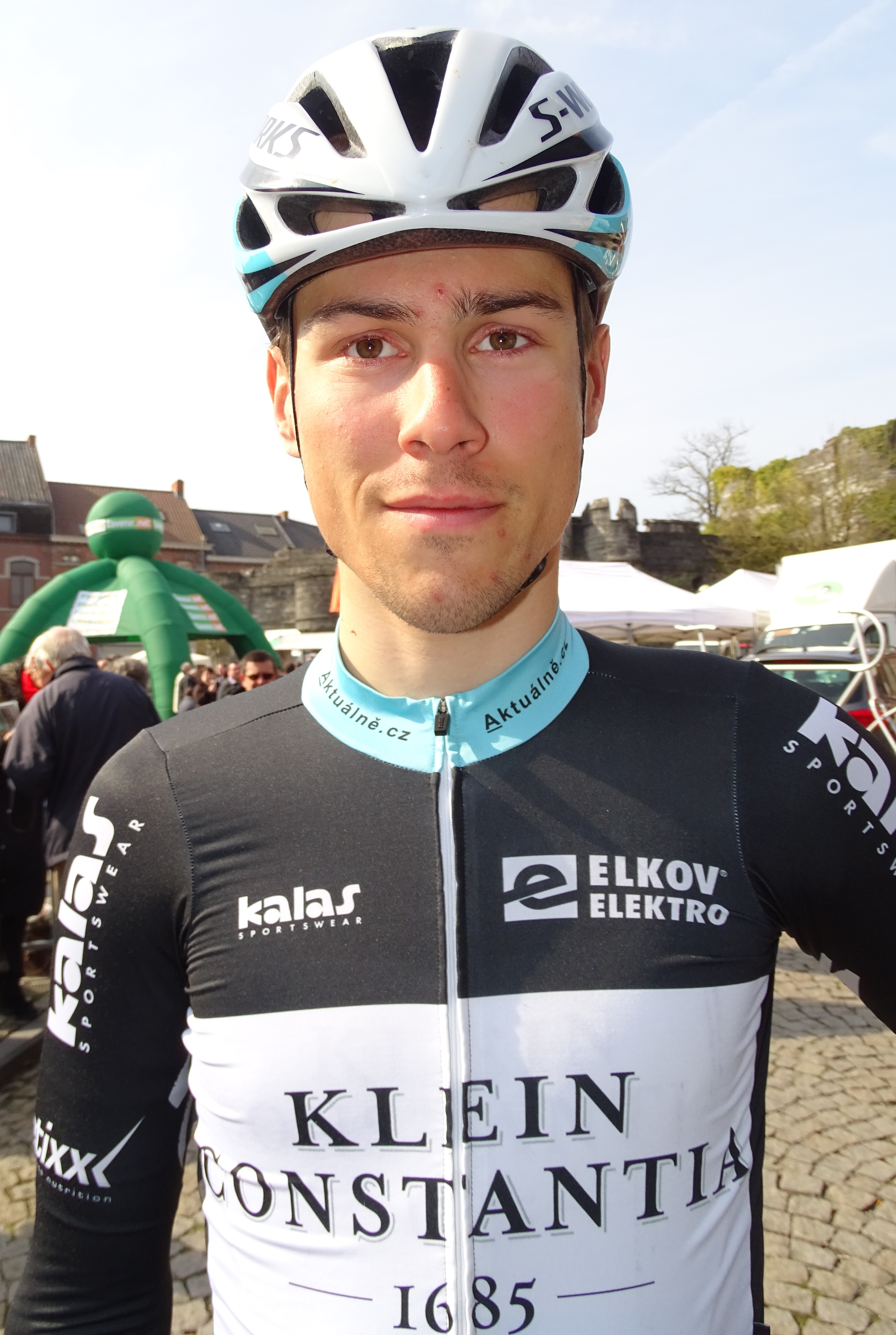
- Sisr in 2016.

Personal information
- Full name: František Sisr
- Born: 17 March 1993 (age 33) Vysoké Mýto, Czech Republic

Cycling career
- Sport: Cycling
- Current team: Kasper Crypto4me
- Disciplines: Road; Track
- Role: Rider (retired); Directeur sportif

Professional teams
- 2012–2015: ASC Dukla Praha
- 2016: Klein Constantia
- 2016: Etixx–Quick-Step (stagiaire)
- 2017–2018: CCC–Sprandi–Polkowice
- 2019–2020: Elkov–Author

Managerial team
- 2021–: Elkov–Kasper

Major wins
- One-day races and Classics National Road Race Championships (2019) Ronde van Drenthe (2018)

Frantisek Sisr (born 17 March 1993) is a Czech former professional cyclist, who rode professionally between 2012 and 2020 for the Team Dukla Praha, Klein Constantia, CCC–Sprandi–Polkowice and Elkov–Kasper teams. He competed in the team pursuit event at the 2013 UCI Track Cycling World Championships, and won the Ronde van Drenthe in 2018. He now works as a directeur sportif for UCI Continental team Kasper Crypto4me.

== Major results ==
2011
2nd Madison, UEC European Junior Track Championships
2013
3rd Team pursuit, UEC European Under-23 Track Championships
8th Tour Bohemia
2015
1st Korona Kocich Gór
1st Points classification East Bohemia Tour
1st Mountains classification Tour of Fuzhou
National Road Championships

3rd Road race
4th Under-23 time trial

8th Overall Tour d'Azerbaïdjan

1st Young rider classification

2016
1st Stage 1 East Bohemia Tour
1st Points classification Okolo Slovenska
2nd Overall Tour de Bretagne

1st Stage 1

5th Overall Course de Solidarność et des Champions Olympiques
5th GP Izola
2017
1st Points race, National Track Championships
4th GP Polski
10th Ronde van Drenthe
2018
1st Ronde van Drenthe
1st GP Hungary
1st Stage 3a (TTT) Sibiu Cycling Tour
9th Schaal Sels
9th Veenendaal–Veenendaal Classic
2019
1st Road race, National Road Championships
2nd Memoriał Romana Siemińskiego
2nd GP Adria Mobil
3rd Overall Dookoła Mazowsza
3rd Memoriał Andrzeja Trochanowskiego
