= Liam Holohan =

British bicycle racer (born 1988)

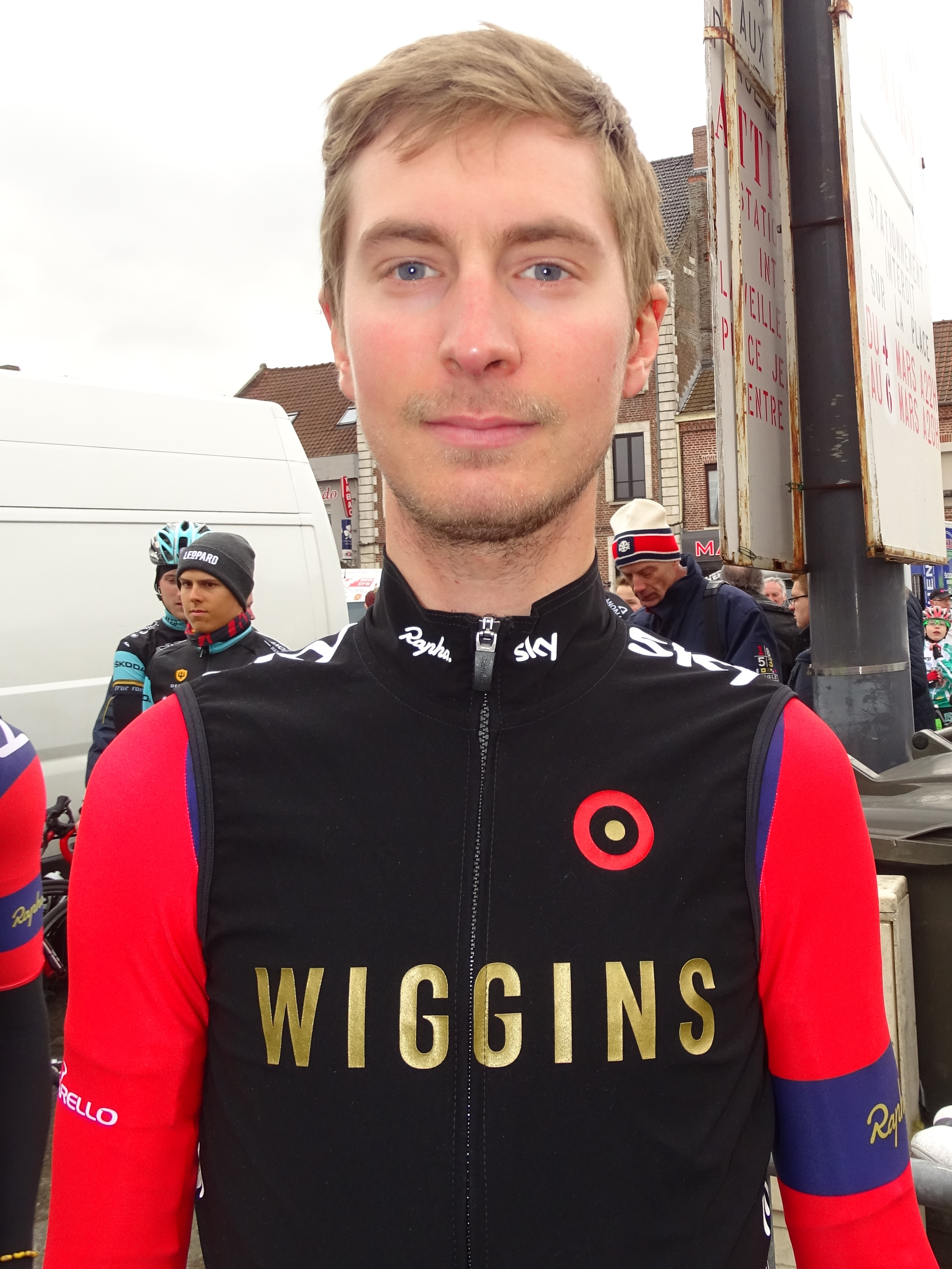
- Holohan in 2016

Personal information
- Full name: Liam Hannu Holohan
- Born: 22 February 1988 (age 38) Leeds, England

Cycling career
- Sport: Cycling
- Current team: Israel Premier Tech
- Discipline: Road
- Role: Coach & Sport Scientist

Amateur teams
- 2017: Metaltek Kuota Racing Team
- 2018: Rhino Velo
- 2018–2020: Holohan Coaching Race Team

Professional teams
- 2009: Rapha Condor
- 2010–2012: Team Raleigh
- 2013–2015: Madison Genesis
- 2016: WIGGINS

Managerial team
- 2021–2022: Saint Piran

Liam Hannu Holohan (born 22 February 1988 in Leeds) is a British former professional cyclist from England, who currently works as a coach and sports scientist for professional cycling team Israel Premier Tech.

== Major results ==
2013
9th Overall Tour de Taiwan
2014
1st Stage 7 An Post Rás
2015
7th Overall Kreiz Breizh Elites
8th Beaumont Trophy
2016
5th Ryedale Grand Prix
9th Overall Tour de Slovaquie
