= Stephan Rabitsch =

Austrian cyclist (born 1991)

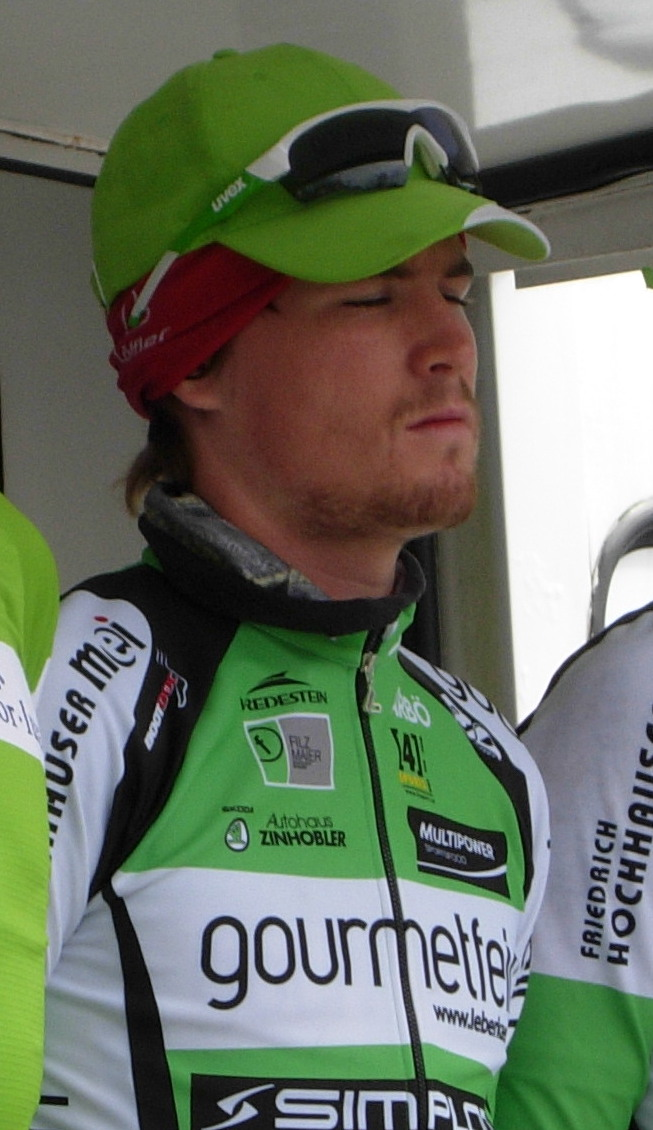
- Rabitsch in 2013

Personal information
- Full name: Stephan Rabitsch
- Born: 28 June 1991 (age 35) Klagenfurt, Austria
- Height: 1.79 m (5 ft 10 in)
- Weight: 69 kg (152 lb)

Cycling career
- Sport: Cycling
- Discipline: Road
- Role: Rider

Professional teams
- 2010–2013: RC Arbö–Gourmetfein–Wels
- 2014: Amplatz–BMC
- 2015–2021: Team Felbermayr–Simplon Wels

Stephan Rabitsch (born 28 June 1991) is an Austrian racing cyclist, who last rode for UCI Continental team Team Felbermayr–Simplon Wels. He rode at the 2013 UCI Road World Championships.

== Major results ==
2008
1st Time trial, National Junior Road Championships
2009
1st Time trial, National Junior Road Championships
2011
1st Stage 1 Sibiu Cycling Tour
2012
1st Stage 1 (TTT) Tour of Szeklerland
2013
5th Ruota d'Oro
2014
5th Croatia–Slovenia
2015
2nd Overall Giro del Friuli-Venezia Giulia
2016
1st Overall Oberösterreich Rundfahrt
8th Overall Okolo Slovenska

1st Stage 4

10th Overall Circuit des Ardennes International
10th G.P. Costa degli Etruschi
10th GP Kranj
2017
1st Overall Oberösterreich Rundfahrt

1st Stage 1

3rd GP Laguna
5th Overall Flèche du Sud

1st Mountains classification

6th Overall Istrian Spring Trophy
7th GP Izola
8th Overall Tour de Savoie Mont-Blanc
2018
1st Overall Rhône-Alpes Isère Tour

1st Stage 3

1st Overall Paris–Arras Tour

1st Stage 2

1st Overall Oberösterreich Rundfahrt

1st Stages 1 & 3

2nd Overall Flèche du Sud
5th Raiffeisen Grand Prix
9th Overall Istrian Spring Trophy
2019
2nd Overall Oberösterreich Rundfahrt
9th Overall Tour of Antalya
10th Raiffeisen Grand Prix
