= Filippo Fortin =

Italian cyclist

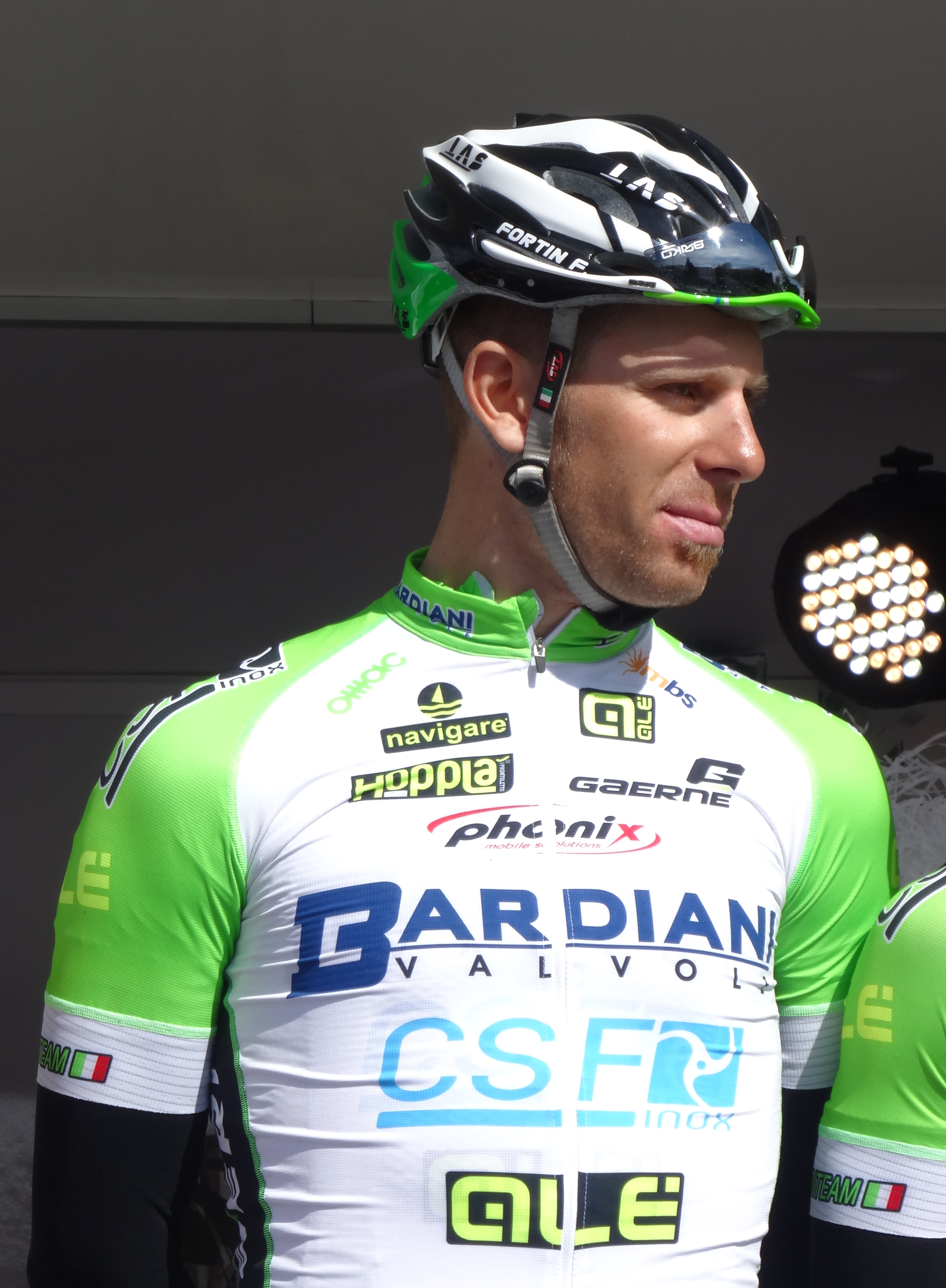
- Fortin in 2014.

Personal information
- Full name: Filippo Fortin
- Born: 1 February 1989 (age 37) Venice, Italy
- Height: 1.83 m (6 ft 0 in)
- Weight: 78 kg (172 lb)

Cycling career
- Sport: Cycling
- Current team: Hrinkow Advarics
- Disciplines: Road; Track
- Role: Rider
- Rider type: Sprinter

Amateur teams
- 2008: FWR Bata–Wilier
- 2009: Molino di Ferro–Giorgione
- 2010–2011: U.C. Trevigiani–Dynamon–Bottoli

Professional teams
- 2011: Androni Giocattoli (stagiaire)
- 2012: Team Type 1–Sanofi
- 2013–2014: Bardiani Valvole–CSF Inox
- 2015–2016: GM Europa Ovini
- 2017: Tirol Cycling Team
- 2018: Team Felbermayr–Simplon Wels
- 2019: Cofidis
- 2020: Team Felbermayr–Simplon Wels
- 2021: Team Vorarlberg
- 2022–2024: Maloja Pushbikers
- 2025: Team Solution Tech–Vini Fantini
- 2026–: Hrinkow Advarics

Filippo Fortin (born 1 February 1989 in Venice) is an Italian professional road and track cyclist, who currently rides for UCI Continental team Hrinkow Advarics.

== Major results ==
2007
1st Team pursuit, National Junior Track Championships (with Elia Viviani, Mario Sgrinzato and Mirko Tedeschi)
2009
8th Trofeo Alcide Degasperi
2011
1st Team pursuit, National Track Championships (with Omar Bertazzo, Giairo Ermeti and Alessandro De Marchi)
1st Stage 4 Vuelta Ciclista de Chile
6th Road race, UCI Under-23 Road World Championships
2012
8th Classic Loire Atlantique
9th Dwars door Drenthe
2015
1st Stage 1 Okolo Slovenska
2nd GP Adria Mobil
2nd Croatia–Slovenia
2016
1st GP Adria Mobil
1st Belgrade–Banja Luka II
Tour de Serbie

1st Points classification
1st Stages 1 & 5

3rd Trofej Umag
7th GP Izola
8th Trofeo Felanitx-Ses Salines-Campos-Porreres
9th Belgrade–Banja Luka I
2017
1st GP Izola
1st Tour de Berne
1st Stage 1 CCC Tour-Grody Piastowskie
Flèche du Sud

1st Points classification
1st Stage 1

1st Stage 1 Oberösterreich Rundfahrt
2nd Trofej Umag
2018
1st GP Adria Mobil
1st Stage 2 Flèche du Sud
1st Stage 4 Szlakiem Walk Majora Hubala
1st Stage 2 Oberösterreich Rundfahrt
1st Stage 4 Czech Cycling Tour
2nd La Popolarissima
3rd Croatia–Slovenia
7th Overall Rhône-Alpes Isère Tour

1st Stage 2

8th GP Laguna
10th Poreč Trophy
2019
9th Tacx Pro Classic
2020
2nd GP Antalya
2nd GP Kranj
5th Grand Prix Alanya
6th Overall Dookoła Mazowsza
2021
1st Stage 1 Istrian Spring Trophy
2nd Trofej Umag
5th Poreč Trophy
2022
1st Stage 2 Belgrade Banjaluka
2nd Großer Preis der Südlichen Weinstraße
5th Circuito del Porto
9th Umag Trophy
9th Poreč Trophy
2023
1st Overall In the footsteps of the Romans

1st Stages 1 & 2

1st Stage 1 Tour of Estonia
1st Stage 1a Tour of Bulgaria
2nd GP Adria Mobil
3rd Overall Baltic Chain Tour
5th Overall Belgrade Banjaluka

1st Stage 3

5th Fyen Rundt
8th Overall Course Cycliste de Solidarnosc et des Champions Olympiques
2024
4th Overall Course Cycliste de Solidarnosc et des Champions Olympiques
7th Circuito del Porto
2025
2nd Umag Classic
5th Circuito del Porto
2026
1st Stage 2 Tour of Malopolska
