= Davide Mucelli =

Italian road racing cyclist

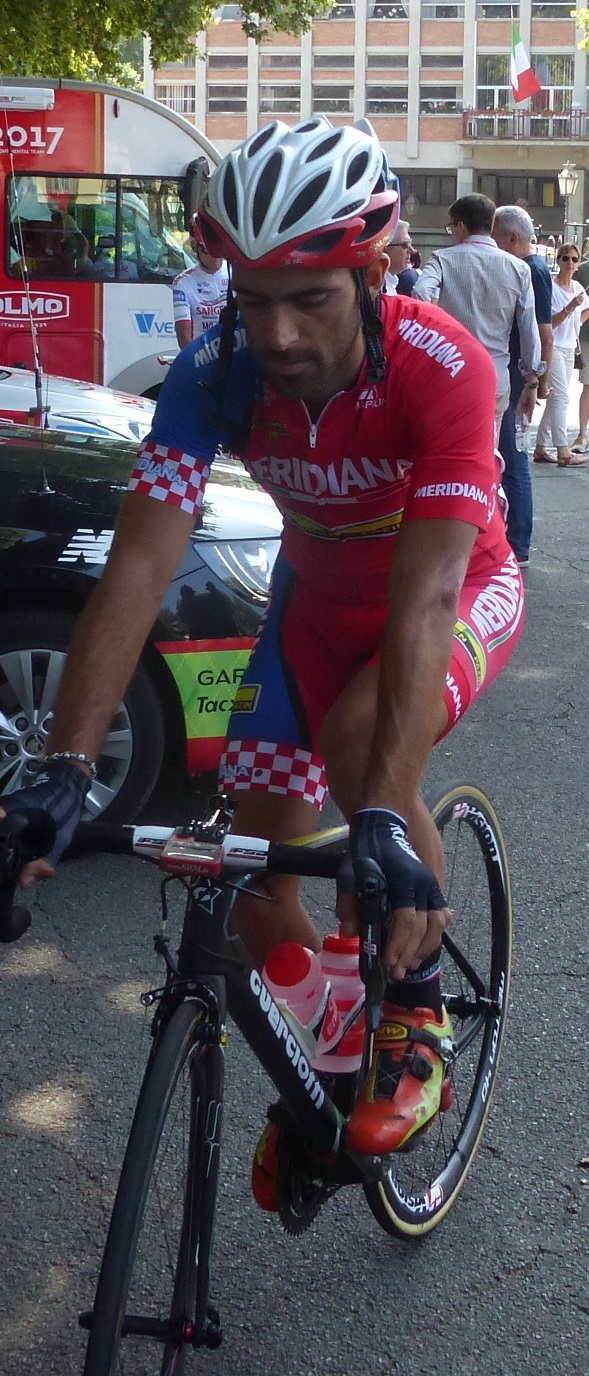
- Davide Mucelli start of the Italian professional championship, Asti 25 June 2017

Personal information
- Full name: Davide Mucelli
- Born: 19 November 1986 (age 39) Livorno, Italy

Cycling career
- Sport: Cycling
- Discipline: Road
- Role: Rider

Professional teams
- 2012: Utensilnord–Named
- 2013: Ceramica Flaminia–Fondriest
- 2014: Meridiana–Kamen
- 2016–2017: Meridiana–Kamen

Davide Mucelli (born 19 November 1986) is an Italian former professional road bicycle racer, who rode professionally from 2012 to 2014, and 2016 to 2017 for the Utensilnord–Named, Ceramica Flaminia–Fondriest and Meridiana–Kamen teams.

== Career ==
Born in Livorno, Mucelli competed as a professional from the start of 2012; he held the lead of the sprints classification on his UCI World Tour début, at the 2012 Tour of the Basque Country. For the 2014 season, Mucelli joined Meridiana–Kamen.

== Major results ==
2006
3rd GP Industria del Cuoio e delle Pelli
3rd Memorial Fausto Coppi
2009
1st GP Industria del Cuoio e delle Pelli
3rd Firenze–Viareggio
3rd Gran Premio Città di Felino
6th Coppa della Pace
2010
2nd Giro delle Valli Aretine
4th Gran Premio San Giuseppe
2011
3rd Gara Ciclistica Millionaria
9th Piccolo Giro di Lombardia
10th Ruota d'Oro
2012
4th Coppa Ugo Agostoni
10th Gran Premio Città di Camaiore
2013
1st Giro dell'Appennino
4th Giro del Medio Brenta
7th Coppa Ugo Agostoni
10th Trofeo Matteotti
10th Coppa Sabatini
2014
3rd Trofej Umag
6th GP Izola
8th Coppa Ugo Agostoni
8th Gran Premio Industria e Commercio di Prato
9th GP Industria & Artigianato di Larciano
10th Poreč Trophy
10th Grand Prix Südkärnten
2016
7th GP Laguna
9th Overall Tour of Bihor
9th Memorial Marco Pantani
2017
4th Poreč Trophy
5th Gran Premio della Costa Etruschi
10th Overall Tour of Qinghai Lake
10th GP Izola
