= Slovak Cycling Federation =

National governing body of cycle racing in Slovakia

SCZ logo

The Slovak Cycling Federation (Slovak: Slovenský Zväz Cyklistiky, SZC) is the national governing body of cycle racing in Slovakia.

The SZC is a member of the UCI and the UEC.
