= Piotr Brożyna =

Polish cyclist

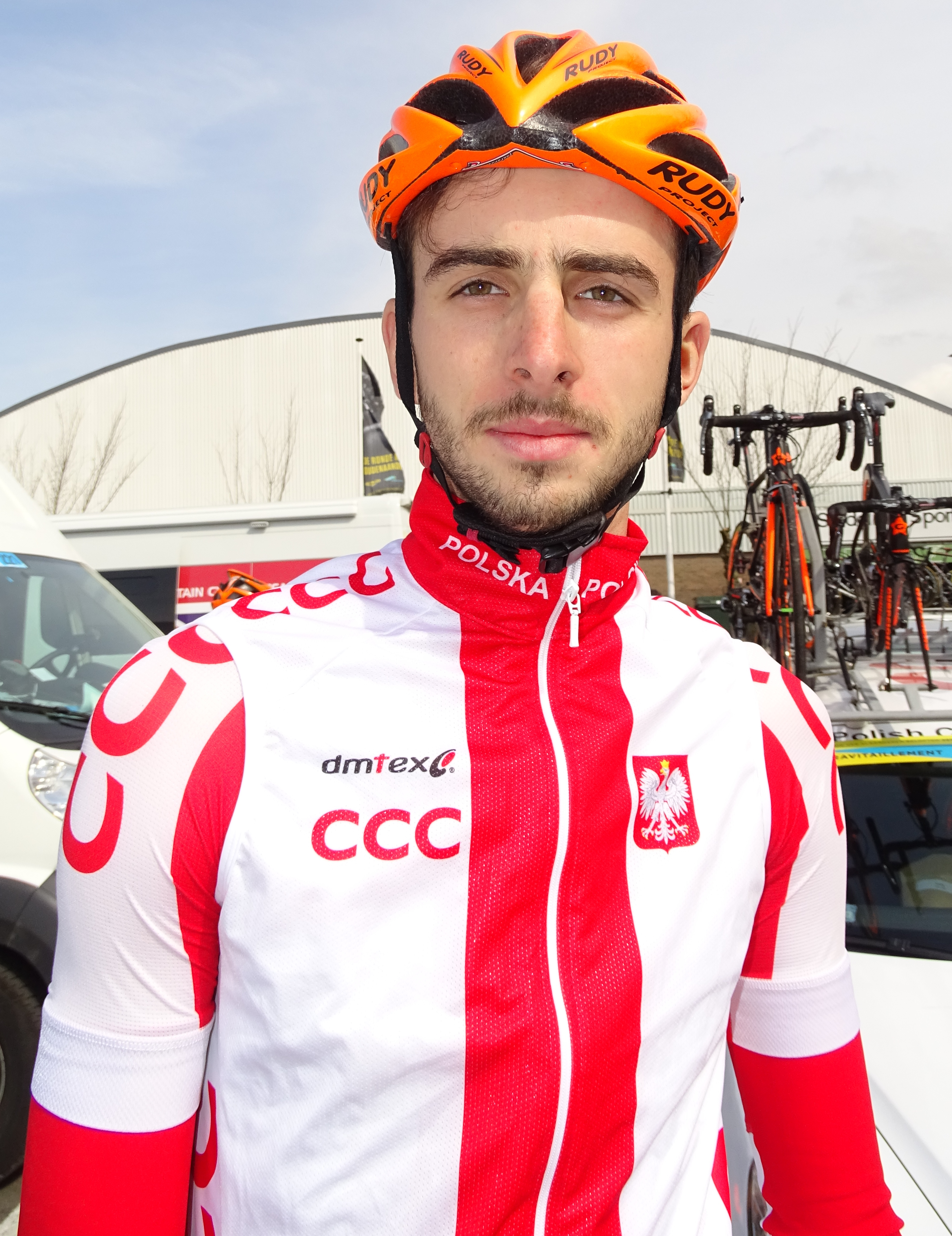
- Brożyna in 2016.

Personal information
- Full name: Piotr Brożyna
- Born: 17 February 1995 (age 31) Zakopane, Poland
- Height: 1.9 m (6 ft 3 in)
- Weight: 71 kg (157 lb)

Cycling career
- Sport: Cycling
- Current team: Team Felt–Felbermayr
- Discipline: Road
- Role: Rider

Amateur team
- 2014: Telco'm–Gimex

Professional teams
- 2015–2019: CCC–Sprandi–Polkowice
- 2020: Voster ATS Team
- 2021–2022: Mazowsze Serce Polski
- 2023: Voster ATS Team
- 2024–: Team Felt–Felbermayr

Piotr Brożyna (born 17 February 1995) is a Polish professional racing cyclist, who currently rides for UCI Continental team Team Felt–Felbermayr.

== Major results ==
2014
1st Road race, National Under-23 Road Championships
2016
3rd Road race, National Under-23 Road Championships
2017
3rd Overall Okolo Slovenska

1st Young rider classification

8th Memorial Grundmanna I Wizowskiego
10th Overall Szlakiem Walk Majora Hubala

1st Young rider classification

2018
7th GP Slovakia, Visegrad 4 Bicycle Race
2019
6th Overall Tour of Romania
6th Overall CCC Tour - Grody Piastowskie
9th Overall Czech Cycling Tour
10th Overall Bałtyk–Karkonosze Tour
2021
5th Overall Szlakiem Grodów Piastowskich
7th Overall Tour of Mevlana
7th Overall Alpes Isère Tour
10th Overall Tour of Małopolska
2022
7th GP Vipava Valley & Crossborder Goriška
7th Memorial Henryka Łasaka
8th GP Adria Mobil
2023
Visegrad 4 Bicycle Race

2nd GP Slovakia
5th GP Czech Republic
7th Kerekparverseny

5th Time trial, National Road Championships
5th Overall Tour of Malopolska
9th Overall Tour of Bulgaria
10th Sundvolden GP
2024
1st Overall Tour de Maurice

1st Stage 2
