= À travers les Hauts-de-France =

French one-day road cycling race

Race details
- Date: May
- Region: France
- Discipline: Road
- Type: One-day race
- Organiser: Clovis Sport Organisation
- Web site: www.clovissportorganisation.fr

History
- First edition: 2010
- Editions: 12 (as of 2022)
- First winner: Rudy Lesschaeve (FRA)
- Most wins: No repeat winners
- Most recent: Mischa Bredewold (NED)

À travers les Hauts-de-France, formerly known as the Paris–Arras Tour is a one-day cycling race that has been held annually in northern France since 2010.

Between 2010 and 2021, it was a men's professional stage race, part of UCI Europe Tour in category 2.2. In January 2022, it was announced that the 2022 edition of the race would change format, becoming a professional women's one-day race in category 1.2.

== Winners ==
=== Men's race (2010-2021) ===
Year	Event name	Rider	Team
2010	Paris-Arras Tour	Rudy Lesschaeve (FRA)	CC Nogent-sur-Oise
2011	Paris-Arras Tour	Romain Delalot (FRA)	CC Nogent-sur-Oise
2012	Paris-Arras Tour	Benoît Daeninck (FRA)	CC Nogent-sur-Oise
2013	Paris-Arras Tour	Joey Rosskopf (USA)	Hincapie Sportswear Development Team
2014	Paris-Arras Tour	Maxime Vantomme (BEL)	Roubaix–Lille Métropole
2015	Paris-Arras Tour	Joeri Calleeuw (BEL)	Verandas Willems
2016	Paris-Arras Tour	Aidis Kruopis (LIT)	Verandas Willems
2017	A Travers Les Hauts De France - Trophee Paris-Arras Tour	Jordan Levasseur (FRA)	Armée de Terre
2018	A Travers Les Hauts De France - Trophee Paris-Arras Tour	Stephan Rabitsch (AUT)	Team Felbermayr–Simplon Wels
2019	A Travers les Hauts de France	Ethan Hayter (GBR)	Great Britain (national team)
2020	No race due to the COVID-19 pandemic in France		
2021	A Travers les Hauts de France	Jason Tesson (FRA)	St. Michel–Auber93

=== Women's race (2022 onwards) ===
Year	Rider	Team
2022	Mischa Bredewold (NED)	Parkhotel Valkenburg
