= Team Felt–Felbermayr =

Austrian cycling team

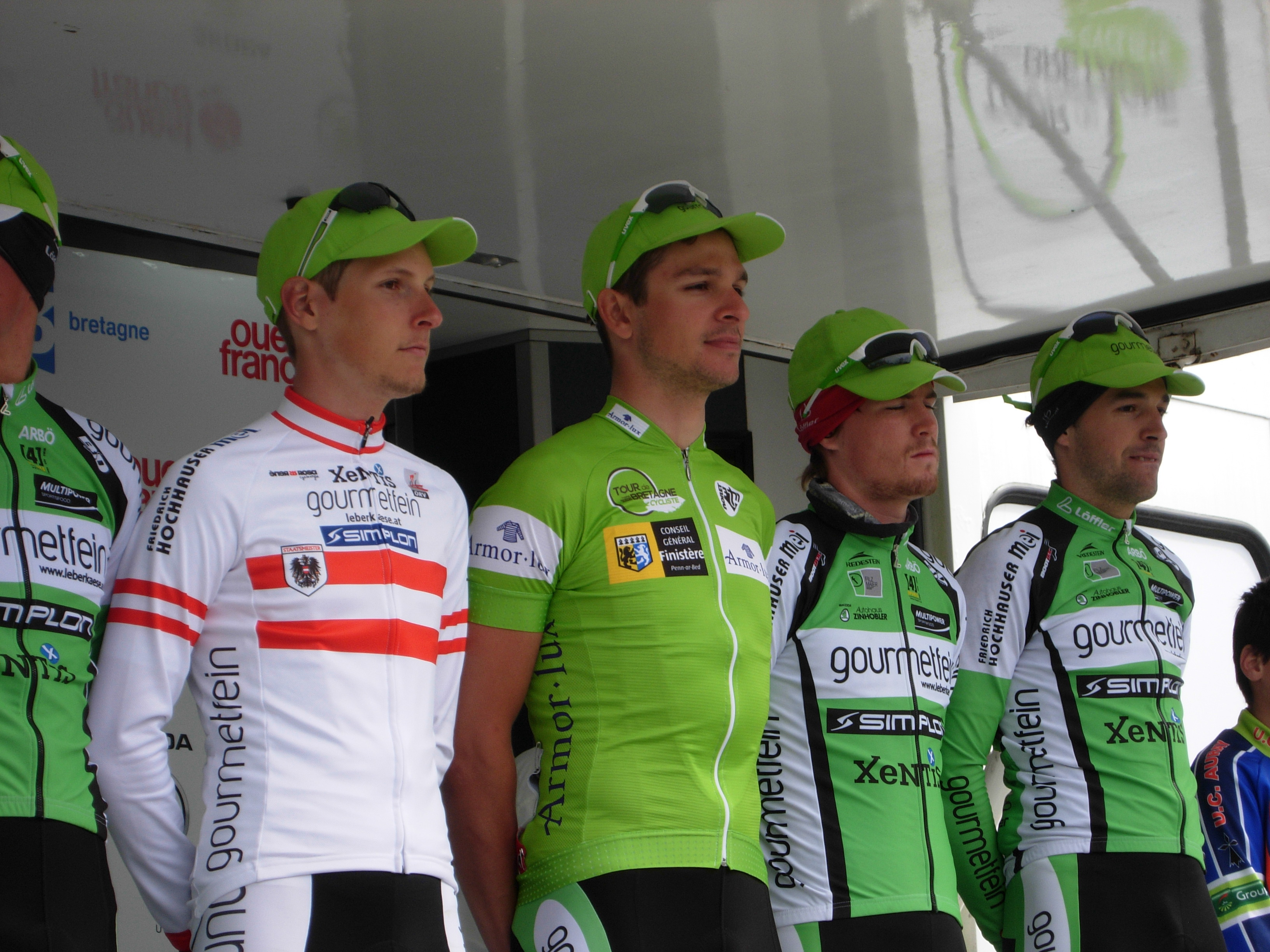

Team information
- UCI code: RSW
- Registered: Austria
- Founded: 2004
- Discipline: Road
- Status: UCI Continental

Key personnel
- General manager: Daniel Repitz
- Team managers: Andreas Grossek; Paul Renger

Team name history
- 2004 2005 2006 2007 2008–2009 2010–2011 2012 2013 2014 2015–2023 2024–: Radclub–Resch & Frisch–EYBL; Arbö–Resch & Frisch–EYBL; RC Arbö–Resch & Frisch–Wels; RC Arbö–Resch & Frisch–Gourmetfein–Wels; RC Arbö–Wels–Gourmetfein; RC Arbö–Gourmetfein–Wels; RC Arbö–Wels–Gourmetfein; Gourmetfein–Simplon; Gourmetfein–Simplon Wels; Team Felbermayr–Simplon Wels; Team Felt–Felbermayr

Team Felt–Felbermayr (UCI team code: RSW) is a UCI Continental team founded in 2004. The team is based in Austria and participates in UCI Continental Circuits races.

== Doping ==
In July 2017, it was announced by the UCI that Matija Kvasina had tested positive for an experimental drug known as Molidustat (BAY-85-3934), during two tests taken during the 2017 Flèche du Sud – a race in which he won. Molidustat represents a class of drugs that act on the same physiological pathways and enzyme cascades as those which are activated during altitude training. Oxygen deprivation has the effect of stimulating the body's production of erythropoietin (EPO) – Molidustat imitates this. Kvasina was subsequently kicked out of the 2017 Tour of Austria.

== Team roster ==
As of 14 February 2024.

Rider	Date of birth
Piotr Brożyna (POL)	17 February 1995 (age 31)
Josef Dirnbauer (AUT)	27 June 1998 (age 28)
Daniel Federspiel (AUT)	21 April 1987 (age 39)
Miguel Heidemann (GER)	27 January 1998 (age 28)
Dominik Hödlmose (AUT)	27 July 2005 (age 21)
Michael Kukrle (CZE)	17 November 1994 (age 31)
Hermann Pernsteiner (AUT)	7 August 1990 (age 36)
Julian Pöchacker (AUT)	26 November 1999 (age 26)

Rider	Date of birth
Jakob Purtscheller (AUT)	9 July 2004 (age 22)
Matthias Reutimann (SUI)	15 November 1994 (age 31)
Felix Ritzinger (AUT)	23 December 1996 (age 29)
Sebastian Schönberger (AUT)	14 May 1994 (age 32)
Patryk Stosz (POL)	15 July 1994 (age 32)
Tom Wirtgen (LUX)	4 March 1996 (age 30)
Emanuel Zangerle (AUT)	24 September 2000 (age 25)
Riccardo Zoidl (AUT)	8 April 1988 (age 38)

== Major wins ==
2006
Stage 4 Tour du Maroc, Klaus Steinkeller
2007
Austria Time Trial Championships, Rupert Probst
2011
Stage 1 Sibiu Cycling Tour, Team time trial
Stage 5 Sibiu Cycling Tour, Riccardo Zoidl
Tobago Cycling Classic, Riccardo Zoidl
2012
Austria Road Race Championships, Lukas Pöstlberger
Austria Time Trial Championships, Riccardo Zoidl
Overall Istrian Spring Trophy, Markus Eibegger

Stage 2, Markus Eibegger

Stage 3 Okolo Slovenska, Werner Riebenbauer
Stage 3 Oberösterreich Rundfahrt, Riccardo Zoidl
Stage 1 Tour of Szeklerland, Team time trial
2013
Overall UCI Europe Tour, Riccardo Zoidl
Croatia Time Trial Championships, Matija Kvasina
Austria Road Race Championships, Riccardo Zoidl
Stage 3 Istrian Spring Trophy, Matej Marin
Overall Circuit des Ardennes, Riccardo Zoidl

Stage 2, Riccardo Zoidl

Overall Tour de Bretagne, Riccardo Zoidl

Stage 2, Riccardo Zoidl

Raiffeisen Grand Prix, Riccardo Zoidl
Overall Oberösterreich Rundfahrt, Riccardo Zoidl

Stages 2 & 3, Riccardo Zoidl

Overall Tour of Austria, Riccardo Zoidl
Stage 2 Sibiu Cycling Tour, Markus Eibegger
GP Kranj, Lukas Pöstlberger
Croatia–Slovenia, Riccardo Zoidl
Stage 3 Okolo Jižních Čech, Matija Kvasina
2014
Stage 2b Le Triptyque des Monts et Châteaux, Patrick Konrad
Overall Rhône-Alpes Isère Tour, Matija Kvasina
Overall Oberösterreich Rundfahrt, Patrick Konrad
Grand Prix Sarajevo, Matej Marin
2015
GP Laguna, Michael Gogl
GP Izola, Gregor Mühlberger
Trofeo Banca Popolare di Vicenza, Felix Großschartner
Raiffeisen Grand Prix, Gregor Mühlberger
Overall Oberösterreich Rundfahrt, Gregor Mühlberger

Stage 4, Gregor Mühlberger

Croatia Time Trial Championships, Matija Kvasina
Stage 2 Giro della Regione Friuli Venezia Giulia, Felix Großschartner
2016
Stage 1 Istrian Spring Trophy, Markus Eibegger
Overall Tour d'Azerbaïdjan, Markus Eibegger
Stage 1 Rhône-Alpes Isère Tour, Daniel Schorn
Stage 3 Okolo Slovenska, Markus Eibegger
2017
Le Triptyque des Monts et Châteaux, Daniel Auer
Stage 4 Circuit des Ardennes, Riccardo Zoidl
Stage 3 Flèche du Sud, Riccardo Zoidl
Overall Oberösterreich Rundfahrt, Stephan Rabitsch

Stage 1, Stephan Rabitsch

2018
GP Adria Mobil, Filippo Fortin
Overall Rhône-Alpes Isère Tour, Stephan Rabitsch

Stage 2, Filippo Fortin
Stage 3, Stephan Rabitsch

Stage 2 Flèche du Sud, Filippo Fortin
Overall Paris–Arras Tour, Stephan Rabitsch

Stage 2, Stephan Rabitsch

Stage 2 Szlakiem Walk Majora Hubala, Lukas Schlemmer
Stage 4 Szlakiem Walk Majora Hubala, Filippo Fortin
Overall Oberösterreich Rundfahrt, Stephan Rabitsch

Stages 1 & 3, Stephan Rabitsch
Stage 2, Filippo Fortin

Overall Tour de Savoie Mont-Blanc, Riccardo Zoidl
Overall Czech Cycling Tour, Riccardo Zoidl

Stage 2, Riccardo Zoidl
Stage 4, Filippo Fortin

2019
Overall Rhône-Alpes Isère Tour, Matthias Krizek
2020
Stage 3 Tour of Antalya, Riccardo Zoidl
2021
Stage 1 Oberösterreich Rundfahrt, Daniel Turek
Stage 3 Circuit des Ardennes, Daniel Turek

== National champions ==
2007
Austria Time Trial Rupert Probst
2012
Austria Time Trial Riccardo Zoidl
Austria Road Race Lukas Pöstlberger
2013
Austria Road Race Riccardo Zoidl
Croatia Time Trial Matija Kvasina
2015
Croatia Time Trial Matija Kvasina
