= Oberösterreich Rundfahrt =

Austrian multi-day road cycling race

Oberösterreichrundfahrt
Race details
- Date: June
- Region: Upper Austria
- Discipline: road
- Competition: UCI Europe Tour
- Type: Stage race
- Organiser: Cycling Federation of Upper Austria
- Web site: www.ooe-classics.at/ooe-rundfahrt

History
- First edition: 2010
- Editions: 16 (as of 2026)
- First winner: Leopold König (CZE)
- Most wins: Stephan Rabitsch (AUT) (3 wins)
- Most recent: Henrique Bravo (BRA)

The Oberösterreichrundfahrt is a cycling race held annually in the Austrian state Upper Austria. It was created in 2010 and is part of the UCI Europe Tour as a category 2.2 race.

== Winners ==
Year	Country	Rider	Team
2010	Czech Republic	Leopold König	PSK Whirlpool–Author
2011	Czech Republic	Petr Benčík	PSK Whirlpool–Author
2012	Slovenia	Robert Vrečer	Team Vorarlberg
2013	Austria	Riccardo Zoidl	Gourmetfein–Simplon
2014	Austria	Patrick Konrad	Gourmetfein–Simplon Wels
2015	Austria	Gregor Mühlberger	Team Felbermayr–Simplon Wels
2016	Austria	Stephan Rabitsch	Team Felbermayr–Simplon Wels
2017	Austria	Stephan Rabitsch	Team Felbermayr–Simplon Wels
2018	Austria	Stephan Rabitsch	Team Felbermayr–Simplon Wels
2019	Germany	Jannik Steimle	Team Vorarlberg Santic
2020	No race due to the COVID-19 pandemic in Austria		
2021	France	Alexis Guérin	Team Vorarlberg
2022	Austria	Rainer Kepplinger	Hrinkow Advarics
2023	Italy	Luca Vergallito	Alpecin–Deceuninck Development Team
2024	France	Adrien Maire	TDT–Unibet Cycling Team
2025	Mexico	Edgar Cadena	Petrolike
2026	Brazil	Henrique Bravo	Soudal–Quick-Step Devo Team
