= 2016 Bardiani–CSF season =

Bardiani–CSF
- 2016 season
- UCI code: BAR
- Status: UCI Professional Continental
- Manager: Roberto Reverberi
- Main sponsor(s): Bardiani Valvole & CSF Inox
- Based: Italy
- Bicycles: MCipollini

Season victories
- One-day races: 5
- Stage race stages: 8

The 2016 season for the Bardiani–CSF cycling team began in February at the Dubai Tour. Bardiani–CSF is an Italian-registered UCI Professional Continental cycling team that participated in road bicycle racing events on the UCI Continental Circuits and when selected as a wildcard to UCI WorldTour events.

== 2016 roster ==
Rider	Date of birth
Simone Andreetta (ITA)	30 August 1993 (aged 22)
Enrico Barbin (ITA)	4 March 1990 (aged 25)
Nicola Boem (ITA)	27 September 1989 (aged 26)
Francesco Manuel Bongiorno (ITA)	1 September 1990 (aged 25)
Luca Chirico (ITA)	16 July 1992 (aged 23)
Giulio Ciccone (ITA)	20 December 1994 (aged 21)
Sonny Colbrelli (ITA)	17 May 1990 (aged 25)
Mirco Maestri (ITA)	26 October 1991 (aged 24)
Stefano Pirazzi (ITA)	11 March 1987 (aged 28)

Rider	Date of birth
Lorenzo Rota (ITA)	23 May 1995 (aged 20)
Nicola Ruffoni (ITA)	14 December 1990 (aged 25)
Paolo Simion (ITA)	10 October 1992 (aged 23)
Luca Sterbini (ITA)	12 November 1992 (aged 23)
Simone Sterbini (ITA)	11 December 1993 (aged 22)
Alessandro Tonelli (ITA)	29 May 1992 (aged 23)
Simone Velasco (ITA)	2 December 1995 (aged 20)
Edoardo Zardini (ITA)	2 November 1989 (aged 26)

Riders who joined the team for the 2016 season

Rider	2015 team
Simone Velasco	neo-pro
Mirco Maestri	neo-pro
Giulio Ciccone	neo-pro
Lorenzo Rota	Unieuro–Wilier

Riders who left the team during or after the 2015 season

Rider	2016 team
Enrico Battaglin	LottoNL–Jumbo
Andrea Manfredi	Retired

== Season victories ==
Date	Race	Competition	Rider	Country	Location
28 February	Gran Premio di Lugano	UCI Europe Tour	Sonny Colbrelli (ITA)	Switzerland	Lugano
27 March	Settimana Internazionale di Coppi e Bartali, Stage 4	UCI Europe Tour	Stefano Pirazzi (ITA)	Italy	Pavullo
17 May	Giro d'Italia, Stage 10	UCI World Tour	Giulio Ciccone (ITA)	Italy	Sestola
3 July	Tour of Austria, Stage 1	UCI Europe Tour	Nicola Ruffoni (ITA)	Austria	Salzburg
7 July	Tour of Austria, Stage 5	UCI Europe Tour	Simone Sterbini (ITA)	Austria	Dobratsch
8 July	Tour of Austria, Stage 6	UCI Europe Tour	Nicola Ruffoni (ITA)	Austria	Stegersbach
18 August	Tour du Limousin, Stage 3	UCI Europe Tour	Sonny Colbrelli (ITA)	France	Liginiac
19 August	Tour du Limousin, Stage 4	UCI Europe Tour	Sonny Colbrelli (ITA)	France	Limoges
26 August	Tour du Poitou-Charentes, Stage 5	UCI Europe Tour	Sonny Colbrelli (ITA)	France	Poitiers
15 September	Coppa Ugo Agostoni	UCI Europe Tour	Sonny Colbrelli (ITA)	Italy	Lissone
22 September	Coppa Sabatini	UCI Europe Tour	Sonny Colbrelli (ITA)	Italy	Peccioli
25 September	Gran Premio Bruno Beghelli	UCI Europe Tour	Nicola Ruffoni (ITA)	Italy	Monteveglio
27 September	Tre Valli Varesine	UCI Europe Tour	Sonny Colbrelli (ITA)	Italy	Varese
