= 2018 Tour of Austria =

2018 UCI Europe Tour

Race details
- Dates: 7–14 July 2018
- Stages: 8
- Distance: 1,163.7 km (723.1 mi)
- Winning time: 29h 11' 51"

Results
Jersey awarded to the overall winner	Winner	Ben Hermans (BEL)	(Israel Cycling Academy)
	Second	Hermann Pernsteiner (AUT)	(Bahrain–Merida)
	Third	Dario Cataldo (ITA)	(Astana)
Jersey awarded to the points classification winner	Points	Giovanni Visconti (ITA)	(Bahrain–Merida)
Jersey awarded to the mountains classification winner	Mountains	Aaron Gate (NZL)	(Aqua Blue Sport)
	Team	Bahrain–Merida	

The 2017 Tour of Austria (German: Österreich-Rundfahrt 2018) was the 70th edition of the Tour of Austria cycling stage race. It began in Feldkirch and finished in Fels, covering a course of 1,163.7 kilometres (723.1 mi) over eight stages. The race was ranked 2.1 as part of the 2018 UCI Europe Tour.

Belgian cyclist Ben Hermans, of the Israel Cycling Academy team, won the race overall. He finished eighteen seconds ahead of second-place Hermann Pernsteiner, of Austria and Bahrain–Merida, and forty-four seconds ahead of Italian Dario Cataldo, riding for Astana, in third. Pernsteiner's teammate, Giovanni Visconti, won the points classification, while Australian rider Aaron Gate, of the Aqua Blue Sport team, took home the mountains classification jersey. The teams classification was won by Bahrain–Merida.

== Teams ==
Twenty teams competed in the 2018 Tour of Austria, among them four UCI WorldTeams, nine UCI Professional Continental teams, and seven UCI Continental teams. Most teams started with seven riders; however, Vérandas Willems–Crelan and Adria Mobil started with only six.

UCI WorldTeams

- Astana
- Bahrain–Merida
- Team Dimension Data
- EF Education First–Drapac p/b Cannondale

UCI Professional Continental Teams

- Aqua Blue Sport
- Bardiani–CSF
- CCC–Sprandi–Polkowice
- Delko–Marseille Provence KTM
- Gazprom–RusVelo
- Israel Cycling Academy
- Roompot–Nederlandse Loterij
- Vérandas Willems–Crelan
- Wanty–Groupe Gobert

UCI Continental Teams

- Adria Mobil
- My Bike–Stevens
- Team Felbermayr–Simplon Wels
- Hrinkow Advarics Cycleang
- Team Vorarlberg Santic
- Tirol Cycling Team
- WSA–Pushbikers

== Route ==
Stage characteristics and winners
Stage	Date	Course	Distance	Type	Winner
1	7 July	Feldkirch to Feldkirch	152.8 km (94.9 mi)	Medium mountain stage	Matej Mohorič (SLO)
2	8 July	Feldkirch to Fulpmes/Telfes	181.5 km (112.8 mi)	Medium mountain stage	Giovanni Visconti (ITA)
3	9 July	Kufstein to Kitzbüheler Horn	133.6 km (83.0 mi)	Mountain stage	Ben Hermans (BEL)
4	10 July	Kitzbühel to Prägraten	143 km (88.9 mi)	Mountain stage	Giovanni Visconti (ITA)
5	11 July	Matrei to Grossglockner	92.9 km (57.7 mi)	Mountain stage	Pieter Weening (NED)
6	12 July	Knittelfeld to Wenigzell	167.4 km (104.0 mi)	Medium mountain stage	Alexey Lutsenko (KAZ)
7	13 July	Waidhofen/Ybbs to Sonntagberg	129.3 km (80.3 mi)	Medium mountain stage	Antonio Nibali (ITA)
8	14 July	Scheibbs to Wels	163.2 km (101.4 mi)	Flat stage	Giovanni Visconti (ITA)

== Stages ==
=== Stage 1 ===
7 July 2018 – Feldkirch to Feldkirch, 152.8 km (94.9 mi)

Stage 1 result
Rank	Rider	Team	Time
1	Matej Mohorič (SLO)	Bahrain–Merida	3h 26' 02"
2	Giovanni Visconti (ITA)	Bahrain–Merida	+ 00"
3	Huub Duijn (NED)	Vérandas Willems–Crelan	+ 00"
4	Floris Gerts (NED)	Roompot–Nederlandse Loterij	+ 00"
5	Odd Christian Eiking (NOR)	Wanty–Groupe Gobert	+ 00"
6	Mark Padun (UKR)	Bahrain–Merida	+ 00"
7	Frederik Backaert (BEL)	Wanty–Groupe Gobert	+ 00"
8	Mark Christian (GBR)	Aqua Blue Sport	+ 00"
9	Roland Thalmann (SUI)	Team Vorarlberg Santic	+ 00"
10	Georg Zimmermann (GER)	Tirol Cycling Team	+ 00"

General classification after Stage 1
Rank	Rider	Team	Time
1	Matej Mohorič (SLO)	Bahrain–Merida	3h 25' 52"
2	Giovanni Visconti (ITA)	Bahrain–Merida	+ 04"
3	Mark Christian (GBR)	Aqua Blue Sport	+ 05"
4	Ben Hermans (BEL)	Israel Cycling Academy	+ 05"
5	Huub Duijn (NED)	Vérandas Willems–Crelan	+ 06"
6	Floris Gerts (NED)	Roompot–Nederlandse Loterij	+ 10"
7	Odd Christian Eiking (NOR)	Wanty–Groupe Gobert	+ 10"
8	Mark Padun (UKR)	Bahrain–Merida	+ 10"
9	Frederik Backaert (BEL)	Wanty–Groupe Gobert	+ 10"
10	Roland Thalmann (SUI)	Team Vorarlberg Santic	+ 10"

=== Stage 2 ===
8 July 2018 – Feldkirch to Fulpmes/Telfes, 181.5 km (112.8 mi)

Stage 2 result
Rank	Rider	Team	Time
1	Giovanni Visconti (ITA)	Bahrain–Merida	4h 30' 32"
2	Michel Kreder (NED)	Aqua Blue Sport	+ 00"
3	Huub Duijn (NED)	Vérandas Willems–Crelan	+ 00"
4	Odd Christian Eiking (NOR)	Wanty–Groupe Gobert	+ 00"
5	Alexey Lutsenko (KAZ)	Astana	+ 03"
6	Frederik Backaert (BEL)	Wanty–Groupe Gobert	+ 03"
7	Žiga Grošelj (SLO)	Adria Mobil	+ 03"
8	Riccardo Zoidl (AUT)	Team Felbermayr–Simplon Wels	+ 03"
9	Nick van der Lijke (NED)	Roompot–Nederlandse Loterij	+ 03"
10	Pieter Weening (NED)	Roompot–Nederlandse Loterij	+ 03"

General classification after Stage 2
Rank	Rider	Team	Time
1	Giovanni Visconti (ITA)	Bahrain–Merida	7h 56' 18"
2	Huub Duijn (NED)	Vérandas Willems–Crelan	+ 08"
3	Matej Mohorič (SLO)	Bahrain–Merida	+ 09"
4	Michel Kreder (NED)	Aqua Blue Sport	+ 10"
5	Ben Hermans (BEL)	Israel Cycling Academy	+ 14"
6	Mark Christian (GBR)	Aqua Blue Sport	+ 14"
7	Odd Christian Eiking (NOR)	Wanty–Groupe Gobert	+ 16"
8	Frederik Backaert (BEL)	Wanty–Groupe Gobert	+ 19"
9	Georg Zimmermann (GER)	Tirol Cycling Team	+ 19"
10	Floris Gerts (NED)	Roompot–Nederlandse Loterij	+ 19"

=== Stage 3 ===
9 July 2018 – Kufstein to Kitzbüheler Horn, 133.6 km (83.0 mi)

Stage 3 result
Rank	Rider	Team	Time
1	Ben Hermans (BEL)	Israel Cycling Academy	3h 30' 11"
2	Hermann Pernsteiner (AUT)	Bahrain–Merida	+ 09"
3	Dario Cataldo (ITA)	Astana	+ 15"
4	Matteo Badilatti (SUI)	Team Vorarlberg Santic	+ 25"
5	Patrick Schelling (SUI)	Team Vorarlberg Santic	+ 25"
6	Mark Padun (UKR)	Bahrain–Merida	+ 35"
7	Mark Christian (GBR)	Aqua Blue Sport	+ 37"
8	Javier Moreno (ESP)	Delko–Marseille Provence KTM	+ 43"
9	Andrey Zeits (KAZ)	Astana	+ 45"
10	Giovanni Carboni (ITA)	Bardiani–CSF	+ 50"

General classification after Stage 3
Rank	Rider	Team	Time
1	Ben Hermans (BEL)	Israel Cycling Academy	11h 26' 33"
2	Hermann Pernsteiner (AUT)	Bahrain–Merida	+ 18"
3	Dario Cataldo (ITA)	Astana	+ 26"
4	Patrick Schelling (SUI)	Team Vorarlberg Santic	+ 40"
5	Matteo Badilatti (SUI)	Team Vorarlberg Santic	+ 40"
6	Mark Christian (GBR)	Aqua Blue Sport	+ 47"
7	Mark Padun (UKR)	Bahrain–Merida	+ 50"
8	Javier Moreno (ESP)	Delko–Marseille Provence KTM	+ 58"
9	Andrey Zeits (KAZ)	Astana	+ 1' 00"
10	Giovanni Carboni (ITA)	Bardiani–CSF	+ 1' 05"

=== Stage 4 ===
10 July 2018 – Kitzbühel to Prägraten, 143 km (88.9 mi)

Stage 4 result
Rank	Rider	Team	Time
1	Giovanni Visconti (ITA)	Bahrain–Merida	3h 14' 28"
2	Wout van Aert (BEL)	Vérandas Willems–Crelan	+ 00"
3	Michael Bresciani (ITA)	Bardiani–CSF	+ 00"
4	Mark Padun (UKR)	Bahrain–Merida	+ 00"
5	Nick van der Lijke (NED)	Roompot–Nederlandse Loterij	+ 00"
6	Dario Cataldo (ITA)	Astana	+ 00"
7	Alexey Lutsenko (KAZ)	Astana	+ 00"
8	Michel Kreder (NED)	Aqua Blue Sport	+ 00"
9	Floris Gerts (NED)	Roompot–Nederlandse Loterij	+ 00"
10	Daniel Geismayr (AUT)	Team Vorarlberg Santic	+ 00"

General classification after Stage 4
Rank	Rider	Team	Time
1	Ben Hermans (BEL)	Israel Cycling Academy	14h 41' 01"
2	Hermann Pernsteiner (AUT)	Bahrain–Merida	+ 18"
3	Dario Cataldo (ITA)	Astana	+ 26"
4	Patrick Schelling (SUI)	Team Vorarlberg Santic	+ 40"
5	Matteo Badilatti (SUI)	Team Vorarlberg Santic	+ 40"
6	Mark Christian (GBR)	Aqua Blue Sport	+ 47"
7	Mark Padun (UKR)	Bahrain–Merida	+ 50"
8	Javier Moreno (ESP)	Delko–Marseille Provence KTM	+ 58"
9	Andrey Zeits (KAZ)	Astana	+ 1' 00"
10	Giovanni Carboni (ITA)	Bardiani–CSF	+ 1' 05"

=== Stage 5 ===
11 July 2018 – Matrei to Grossglockner, 92.9 km (57.7 mi)

Stage 5 result
Rank	Rider	Team	Time
1	Pieter Weening (NED)	Roompot–Nederlandse Loterij	2h 50' 32"
2	Alexander Foliforov (RUS)	Gazprom–RusVelo	+ 49"
3	Simone Sterbini (ITA)	Bardiani–CSF	+ 1' 11"
4	Antonio Nibali (ITA)	Bahrain–Merida	+ 1' 26"
5	Javier Moreno (ESP)	Delko–Marseille Provence KTM	+ 1' 36"
6	Riccardo Zoidl (AUT)	Team Felbermayr–Simplon Wels	+ 1' 36"
7	Ben Hermans (BEL)	Israel Cycling Academy	+ 1' 40"
8	Hermann Pernsteiner (AUT)	Bahrain–Merida	+ 1' 40"
9	Mark Padun (UKR)	Bahrain–Merida	+ 1' 51"
10	Patrick Schelling (SUI)	Team Vorarlberg Santic	+ 1' 53"

General classification after Stage 5
Rank	Rider	Team	Time
1	Ben Hermans (BEL)	Israel Cycling Academy	17h 33' 13"
2	Hermann Pernsteiner (AUT)	Bahrain–Merida	+ 18"
3	Dario Cataldo (ITA)	Astana	+ 48"
4	Patrick Schelling (SUI)	Team Vorarlberg Santic	+ 53"
5	Javier Moreno (ESP)	Delko–Marseille Provence KTM	+ 54"
6	Mark Padun (UKR)	Bahrain–Merida	+ 1' 01"
7	Riccardo Zoidl (AUT)	Team Felbermayr–Simplon Wels	+ 1' 14"
8	Giovanni Carboni (ITA)	Bardiani–CSF	+ 1' 45"
9	Ildar Arslanov (RUS)	Gazprom–RusVelo	+ 1' 49"
10	Matteo Badilatti (SUI)	Team Vorarlberg Santic	+ 2' 02"

=== Stage 6 ===
12 July 2018 – Knittelfeld to Wenigzell, 167.4 km (104.0 mi)

Stage 6 result
Rank	Rider	Team	Time
1	Alexey Lutsenko (KAZ)	Astana	4h 19' 25"
2	Matej Mohorič (SLO)	Bahrain–Merida	+ 07"
3	Odd Christian Eiking (NOR)	Wanty–Groupe Gobert	+ 50"
4	Lachlan Morton (AUS)	Team Dimension Data	+ 54"
5	Simone Sterbini (ITA)	Bardiani–CSF	+ 59"
6	Ángel Madrazo (ESP)	Delko–Marseille Provence KTM	+ 1' 03"
7	Wout van Aert (BEL)	Vérandas Willems–Crelan	+ 1' 38"
8	Riccardo Zoidl (AUT)	Team Felbermayr–Simplon Wels	+ 2' 12"
9	Dario Cataldo (ITA)	Astana	+ 2' 14"
10	Paweł Cieślik (POL)	CCC–Sprandi–Polkowice	+ 2' 14"

General classification after Stage 6
Rank	Rider	Team	Time
1	Ben Hermans (BEL)	Israel Cycling Academy	21h 54' 52"
2	Hermann Pernsteiner (AUT)	Bahrain–Merida	+ 18"
3	Dario Cataldo (ITA)	Astana	+ 48"
4	Patrick Schelling (SUI)	Team Vorarlberg Santic	+ 53"
5	Javier Moreno (ESP)	Delko–Marseille Provence KTM	+ 54"
6	Mark Padun (UKR)	Bahrain–Merida	+ 1' 01"
7	Riccardo Zoidl (AUT)	Team Felbermayr–Simplon Wels	+ 1' 12"
8	Ángel Madrazo (ESP)	Delko–Marseille Provence KTM	+ 1' 33"
9	Giovanni Carboni (ITA)	Bardiani–CSF	+ 1' 45"
10	Ildar Arslanov (RUS)	Gazprom–RusVelo	+ 1' 49"

=== Stage 7 ===
13 July 2018 – Waidhofen/Ybbs to Sonntagberg, 129.3 km (80.3 mi)

Stage 7 result
Rank	Rider	Team	Time
1	Antonio Nibali (ITA)	Bahrain–Merida	3h 38' 57"
2	Paweł Cieślik (POL)	CCC–Sprandi–Polkowice	+ 03"
3	Artem Nych (RUS)	Gazprom–RusVelo	+ 15"
4	Matej Mohorič (SLO)	Bahrain–Merida	+ 35"
5	Dario Cataldo (ITA)	Astana	+ 1' 08"
6	Ben Hermans (BEL)	Israel Cycling Academy	+ 1' 12"
7	Hermann Pernsteiner (AUT)	Bahrain–Merida	+ 1' 12"
8	Riccardo Zoidl (AUT)	Team Felbermayr–Simplon Wels	+ 1' 12"
9	Louis Meintjes (RSA)	Team Dimension Data	+ 1' 12"
10	Patrick Schelling (SUI)	Team Vorarlberg Santic	+ 1' 20"

General classification after Stage 7
Rank	Rider	Team	Time
1	Ben Hermans (BEL)	Israel Cycling Academy	25h 35' 01"
2	Hermann Pernsteiner (AUT)	Bahrain–Merida	+ 18"
3	Dario Cataldo (ITA)	Astana	+ 44"
4	Patrick Schelling (SUI)	Team Vorarlberg Santic	+ 1' 01"
5	Riccardo Zoidl (AUT)	Team Felbermayr–Simplon Wels	+ 1' 12"
6	Javier Moreno (ESP)	Delko–Marseille Provence KTM	+ 1' 21"
7	Ángel Madrazo (ESP)	Delko–Marseille Provence KTM	+ 1' 41"
8	Giovanni Carboni (ITA)	Bardiani–CSF	+ 1' 58"
9	Matteo Badilatti (SUI)	Team Vorarlberg Santic	+ 2' 13"
10	Artem Nych (RUS)	Gazprom–RusVelo	+ 2' 18"

=== Stage 8 ===
14 July 2018 – Scheibbs to Wels, 163.2 km (101.4 mi)

Stage 8 result
Rank	Rider	Team	Time
1	Giovanni Visconti (ITA)	Bahrain–Merida	3h 36' 01"
2	Alexey Lutsenko (KAZ)	Astana	+ 00"
3	Nick van der Lijke (NED)	Roompot–Nederlandse Loterij	+ 00"
4	Nikolay Mihaylov (BUL)	Delko–Marseille Provence KTM	+ 00"
5	Lachlan Morton (AUS)	Team Dimension Data	+ 00"
6	Wout van Aert (BEL)	Vérandas Willems–Crelan	+ 49"
7	Marco Maronese (ITA)	Bardiani–CSF	+ 49"
8	Yevgeniy Gidich (KAZ)	Astana	+ 49"
9	Manuel Porzner (GER)	Tirol Cycling Team	+ 49"
10	Shane Archbold (NZL)	Aqua Blue Sport	+ 49"

General classification after Stage 8
Rank	Rider	Team	Time
1	Ben Hermans (BEL)	Israel Cycling Academy	29h 11' 51"
2	Hermann Pernsteiner (AUT)	Bahrain–Merida	+ 18"
3	Dario Cataldo (ITA)	Astana	+ 44"
4	Patrick Schelling (SUI)	Team Vorarlberg Santic	+ 1' 01"
5	Riccardo Zoidl (AUT)	Team Felbermayr–Simplon Wels	+ 1' 12"
6	Javier Moreno (ESP)	Delko–Marseille Provence KTM	+ 1' 21"
7	Ángel Madrazo (ESP)	Delko–Marseille Provence KTM	+ 1' 41"
8	Giovanni Carboni (ITA)	Bardiani–CSF	+ 1' 58"
9	Matteo Badilatti (SUI)	Team Vorarlberg Santic	+ 2' 13"
10	Artem Nych (RUS)	Gazprom–RusVelo	+ 2' 18"

== Classification leadership ==
Stage	Winner	General classification	Points classification	Mountains classification	Austrian rider classification	Team classification
1	Matej Mohorič	Matej Mohorič	Matej Mohorič (Note: On stage 2, Giovanni Visconti wore the green jersey as second in the points classification, as Matej Mohorič wore the overall race leader's jersey.)	Aaron Gate	Stephan Rabitsch	Israel Cycling Academy
2	Giovanni Visconti	Giovanni Visconti	Giovanni Visconti (Note: On stage 3, Huub Duijn wore the green jersey as second in the points competition, as Giovanni Visconti wore the general classification leader's jersey.)	Aaron Gate	Stephan Rabitsch	Aqua Blue Sport
3	Ben Hermans	Ben Hermans	Giovanni Visconti	Aaron Gate	Hermann Pernsteiner	Bahrain–Merida
4	Giovanni Visconti	Ben Hermans	Giovanni Visconti	Aaron Gate	Hermann Pernsteiner	Bahrain–Merida
5	Pieter Weening	Ben Hermans	Giovanni Visconti	Aaron Gate	Hermann Pernsteiner	Bahrain–Merida
6	Alexey Lutsenko	Ben Hermans	Giovanni Visconti	Aaron Gate	Hermann Pernsteiner	Bahrain–Merida
7	Antonio Nibali	Ben Hermans	Matej Mohorič	Aaron Gate	Hermann Pernsteiner	Bahrain–Merida
8	Giovanni Visconti	Ben Hermans	Giovanni Visconti	Aaron Gate	Hermann Pernsteiner	Bahrain–Merida
Final		Ben Hermans	Giovanni Visconti	Aaron Gate	Hermann Pernsteiner	Bahrain–Merida

== Final classification standings ==
Legend
Denotes the winner of the general classification	Denotes the winner of the mountains classification
Denotes the winner of the points classification	Denotes the winner of the Austrian rider classification

=== General classification ===
Final general classification (1-10)
Rank	Rider	Team	Time
1	Ben Hermans (BEL)	Israel Cycling Academy	29h 11' 51"
2	Hermann Pernsteiner (AUT)	Bahrain–Merida	+ 18"
3	Dario Cataldo (ITA)	Astana	+ 44"
4	Patrick Schelling (SUI)	Team Vorarlberg Santic	+ 1' 01"
5	Riccardo Zoidl (AUT)	Team Felbermayr–Simplon Wels	+ 1' 12"
6	Javier Moreno (ESP)	Delko–Marseille Provence KTM	+ 1' 21"
7	Ángel Madrazo (ESP)	Delko–Marseille Provence KTM	+ 1' 41"
8	Giovanni Carboni (ITA)	Bardiani–CSF	+ 1' 58"
9	Matteo Badilatti (SUI)	Team Vorarlberg Santic	+ 2' 13"
10	Artem Nych (RUS)	Gazprom–RusVelo	+ 2' 18"

=== Points classification ===
Final points classification (1-10)
Rank	Rider	Team	Points
1	Giovanni Visconti (ITA)	Bahrain–Merida	68
2	Matej Mohorič (SLO)	Bahrain–Merida	65
3	Alexey Lutsenko (KAZ)	Astana	47
4	Ben Hermans (BEL)	Israel Cycling Academy	27
5	Dario Cataldo (ITA)	Astana	26
6	Nick van der Lijke (NED)	Roompot–Nederlandse Loterij	25
7	Odd Christian Eiking (NOR)	Wanty–Groupe Gobert	25
8	Antonio Nibali (ITA)	Bahrain–Merida	23
9	Wout van Aert (BEL)	Vérandas Willems–Crelan	23
10	Hermann Pernsteiner (AUT)	Bahrain–Merida	21

=== Mountains classification ===
Final mountains classification (1-10)
Rank	Rider	Team	Points
1	Aaron Gate (AUS)	Aqua Blue Sport	81
2	Davide Orrico (ITA)	Team Vorarlberg Santic	53
3	Alexey Lutsenko (KAZ)	Astana	40
4	Matej Mohorič (SLO)	Bahrain–Merida	30
5	Marcel Neuhäuser (AUT)	Tirol Cycling Team	21
6	Antonio Nibali (ITA)	Bahrain–Merida	18
7	Pieter Weening (NED)	Roompot–Nederlandse Loterij	16
8	Matthias Krizek (AUT)	Team Felbermayr–Simplon Wels	16
9	Ben Hermans (BEL)	Israel Cycling Academy	15
10	Giovanni Visconti (ITA)	Bahrain–Merida	14

=== Team classification ===
Final team classification (1-10)
Rank	Team	Time
1	Bahrain–Merida	87h 34' 14"
2	Team Vorarlberg Santic	+ 10' 47"
3	Gazprom–RusVelo	+ 12' 05"
4	Astana	+ 17' 15"
5	Delko–Marseille Provence KTM	+ 29' 09"
6	CCC–Sprandi–Polkowice	+ 33' 48"
7	Team Dimension Data	+ 35' 25"
8	Israel Cycling Academy	+ 41' 27"
9	Wanty–Groupe Gobert	+ 43' 14"
10	Roompot–Nederlandse Loterij	+ 51' 16"
