= 2016 Tour of Austria =

2016 UCI Europe Tour

Race details
- Dates: 2–9 July
- Stages: 7 + Prologue
- Distance: 1,287.3 km (799.9 mi)
- Winning time: 30hr 52' 09"

Results
Jersey awarded to the overall winner	Winner	Jan Hirt (CZE)	(CCC–Sprandi–Polkowice)
	Second	Guillaume Martin (FRA)	(Wanty–Groupe Gobert)
	Third	Patrick Schelling (SUI)	(Team Vorarlberg)
Jersey awarded to the points classification winner	Points	Frederik Backaert (BEL)	(Wanty–Groupe Gobert)
Jersey awarded to the mountains classification winner	Mountains	Alessandro Vanotti (ITA)	(Astana)
	Team	Wanty–Groupe Gobert	

The 2016 Tour of Austria (German: Österreich-Rundfahrt) was the 68th edition of the Tour of Austria cycling stage race. The 1287.3 km (799.9 mi)-long race started in Vienna on 2 July with an individual time trial prologue, and concluded in Vienna on 9 July. This was the first time in several years that the race consisted of 7 stages plus a prologue. The race is part of the 2016 UCI Europe Tour, and is rated as a 2.1 event.

== Schedule ==
Stage characteristics and winners
Stage	Date	Course	Distance	Type	Winner
P	2 July	Kitzbüheler Horn	700 m (2,296.6 ft)	Mountain time trial	Will Clarke (AUS)
1	3 July	Innsbruck to Salzburg	186.2 km (116 mi)	Intermediate stage	Nicola Ruffoni (ITA)
2	4 July	Mondsee to Steyr	205.5 km (128 mi)	Intermediate stage	Clément Venturini (FRA)
3	5 July	Ardagger to Sonntagberg	181.3 km (113 mi)	Hilly stage	Brendan Canty (AUS)
4	6 July	Rottenmann to Edelweißspitze	182.2 km (113 mi)	Mountain stage	Jan Hirt (CZE)
5	7 July	Millstatt to Dobratsch	147.3 km (92 mi)	Mountain stage	Simone Sterbini (ITA)
6	8 July	Graz to Stegersbach	203.9 km (127 mi)	Intermediate stage	Nicola Ruffoni (ITA)
7	9 July	Bad Tatzmannsdorf to Vienna	179.8 km (112 mi)	Hilly stage	Frederik Backaert (BEL)
Total		1,286.9 km (799.6 mi)			

== Participating teams ==
Nineteen (19) team participated in the 2016 edition of the Tour of Austria.

UCI WorldTeams (18/1)

- Astana

UCI Professional Continental teams

- CCC–Sprandi–Polkowice
- Cofidis
- Wanty–Groupe Gobert
- Roompot–Oranje Peloton
- Gazprom–RusVelo
- Bardiani–CSF
- Stölting Service Group
- Delko–Marseille Provence KTM
- Team Roth
- Drapac Professional Cycling

UCI Continental teams

- Amplatz–BMC
- Team Felbermayr–Simplon Wels
- Hrinkow Advarics Cycleangteam
- Tirol Cycling Team
- Team Vorarlberg
- WSA–Greenlife
- Adria Mobil
- Wibatech–Fuji

== Stages ==
=== Prologue ===
2 July 2016 — Kitzbüheler Horn, 700 m (2,296.6 ft), individual time trial (ITT)

Prologue result and General classification after Prologue
Rank	Rider	Team	Time
1	Will Clarke (AUS)	Drapac Professional Cycling	1' 10"
2	Lukas Schlemmer (AUT)	WSA–Greenlife	+ 1"
3	Sylwester Janiszewski (POL)	Wibatech–Fuji	+ 2"
4	Nicola Ruffoni (ITA)	Bardiani–CSF	+ 3"
5	Arman Kamyshev (KAZ)	Astana	+ 4"
6	Andrea Pasqualon (ITA)	Team Roth	+ 4"
7	Jan Tratnik (SLO)	Amplatz–BMC	+ 4"
8	Adrian Honkisz (POL)	CCC–Sprandi–Polkowice	+ 4"
9	Luca Chirico (ITA)	Bardiani–CSF	+ 4"
10	Clemens Fankhauser (AUT)	Tirol Cycling Team	+ 4"

=== Stage 1 ===
3 July 2016 — Innsbruck to Salzburg, 186.2 km (115.7 mi)

Result of Stage 1
Rank	Rider	Team	Time
1	Nicola Ruffoni (ITA)	Bardiani–CSF	4h 00' 51"
2	Andrea Pasqualon (ITA)	Team Roth	s.t.
3	Yannick Martinez (FRA)	Delko–Marseille Provence KTM	s.t.
4	Clément Venturini (FRA)	Cofidis	s.t.
5	Daniel Auer (AUT)	Team Felbermayr–Simplon Wels	s.t.
6	Arman Kamyshev (KAZ)	Astana	s.t.
7	Sjoerd van Ginneken (NED)	Roompot–Oranje Peloton	s.t.
8	Gašper Katrašnik (SLO)	Adria Mobil	s.t.
9	Patryk Stosz (POL)	CCC–Sprandi–Polkowice	s.t.
10	Artur Ershov (RUS)	Gazprom–RusVelo	s.t.

General classification after Stage 1
Rank	Rider	Team	Time
1	Nicola Ruffoni (ITA)	Bardiani–CSF	4h 01' 54"
2	Andrea Pasqualon (ITA)	Team Roth	+ 5"
3	Will Clarke (AUS)	Drapac Professional Cycling	+ 7"
4	Lukas Schlemmer (AUT)	WSA–Greenlife	+ 8"
5	Sylwester Janiszewski (POL)	Wibatech–Fuji	+ 9"
6	Arman Kamyshev (KAZ)	Astana	+ 11"
7	Jan Tratnik (SLO)	Amplatz–BMC	+ 11"
8	Adrian Honkisz (POL)	CCC–Sprandi–Polkowice	+ 11"
9	Luca Chirico (ITA)	Bardiani–CSF	+ 11"
10	Clemens Fankhauser (AUT)	Tirol Cycling Team	+ 11"

=== Stage 2 ===
4 July 2016 — Mondsee to Steyr, 205.5 km (127.7 mi)

Result of Stage 2
Rank	Rider	Team	Time
1	Clément Venturini (FRA)	Cofidis	4h 48' 25"
2	Andrea Pasqualon (ITA)	Team Roth	s.t.
3	Sjoerd van Ginneken (NED)	Roompot–Oranje Peloton	s.t.
4	Frederik Backaert (BEL)	Wanty–Groupe Gobert	s.t.
5	Delio Fernández (ESP)	Delko–Marseille Provence KTM	s.t.
6	Sylwester Janiszewski (POL)	Wibatech–Fuji	s.t.
7	Rudy Molard (FRA)	Cofidis	s.t.
8	Bakhtiyar Kozhatayev (KAZ)	Astana	s.t.
9	Matthias Krizek (AUT)	Team Roth	s.t.
10	Florian Bissinger (GER)	WSA–Greenlife	s.t.

General classification after Stage 2
Rank	Rider	Team	Time
1	Andrea Pasqualon (ITA)	Team Roth	8h 50' 18"
2	Clément Venturini (FRA)	Cofidis	+ 4"
3	Sylwester Janiszewski (POL)	Wibatech–Fuji	+ 10"
4	Quentin Pacher (FRA)	Delko–Marseille Provence KTM	+ 10"
5	Arman Kamyshev (KAZ)	Astana	+ 12"
6	Jan Tratnik (SLO)	Amplatz–BMC	+ 12"
7	Luca Chirico (ITA)	Bardiani–CSF	+ 12"
8	Clemens Fankhauser (AUT)	Tirol Cycling Team	+ 12"
9	Markus Eibegger (AUT)	Team Felbermayr–Simplon Wels	+ 15"
10	Sjoerd van Ginneken (NED)	Roompot–Oranje Peloton	+ 16"

=== Stage 3 ===
5 July 2016 — Ardagger Markt to Sonntagberg, 181.1 km (112.5 mi)

Result of Stage 3
Rank	Rider	Team	Time
1	Brendan Canty (AUS)	Drapac Professional Cycling	4h 59' 20"
2	Markus Eibegger (AUT)	Team Felbermayr–Simplon Wels	+ 11"
3	Marek Rutkiewicz (POL)	Wibatech–Fuji	+ 17"
4	Hermann Pernsteiner (AUT)	Amplatz–BMC	+ 17"
5	Guillaume Martin (FRA)	Wanty–Groupe Gobert	+ 17"
6	Jan Hirt (CZE)	CCC–Sprandi–Polkowice	+ 20"
7	Stéphane Rossetto (FRA)	Cofidis	+ 22"
8	Patrick Schelling (SUI)	Team Vorarlberg	+ 22"
9	Stefano Pirazzi (ITA)	Bardiani–CSF	+ 26"
10	Delio Fernández (ESP)	Delko–Marseille Provence KTM	+ 28"

General classification after Stage 3
Rank	Rider	Team	Time
1	Markus Eibegger (AUT)	Team Felbermayr–Simplon Wels	13h 49' 58"
2	Brendan Canty (AUS)	Drapac Professional Cycling	+ 4"
3	Marek Rutkiewicz (POL)	Wibatech–Fuji	+ 13"
4	Guillaume Martin (FRA)	Wanty–Groupe Gobert	+ 17"
5	Patrick Schelling (SUI)	Team Vorarlberg	+ 23"
6	Jan Hirt (CZE)	CCC–Sprandi–Polkowice	+ 24"
7	Delio Fernández (ESP)	Delko–Marseille Provence KTM	+ 27"
8	Stéphane Rossetto (FRA)	Cofidis	+ 29"
9	Stephan Rabitsch (AUT)	Team Felbermayr–Simplon Wels	+ 30"
10	Clemens Fankhauser (AUT)	Tirol Cycling Team	+ 31"

=== Stage 4 ===
6 July 2016 — Rottenmann to Edelweißspitze, 182.2 km (113.2 mi)

Result of Stage 4
Rank	Rider	Team	Time
1	Jan Hirt (CZE)	CCC–Sprandi–Polkowice	5h 17' 23"
2	David Belda (ESP)	Team Roth	+ 43"
3	Guillaume Martin (FRA)	Wanty–Groupe Gobert	+ 1' 18"
4	Patrick Schelling (SUI)	Team Vorarlberg	+ 1' 20"
5	Delio Fernández (ESP)	Delko–Marseille Provence KTM	+ 1' 20"
6	Stéphane Rossetto (FRA)	Cofidis	+ 1' 34"
7	Hermann Pernsteiner (AUT)	Amplatz–BMC	+ 1' 47"
8	Bakhtiyar Kozhatayev (KAZ)	Astana	+ 2' 42"
9	Rémy Di Gregorio (FRA)	Delko–Marseille Provence KTM	+ 2' 46"
10	Marco Minnaard (NED)	Wanty–Groupe Gobert	+ 2' 46"

General classification after Stage 4
Rank	Rider	Team	Time
1	Jan Hirt (CZE)	CCC–Sprandi–Polkowice	19h 07' 35"
2	Guillaume Martin (FRA)	Wanty–Groupe Gobert	+ 1' 17"
3	Patrick Schelling (SUI)	Team Vorarlberg	+ 1' 29"
4	Delio Fernández (ESP)	Delko–Marseille; Provence KTM	+ 1' 33"
5	Stéphane Rossetto (FRA)	Cofidis	+ 1' 49"
6	Hermann Pernsteiner (AUT)	Amplatz–BMC	+ 2' 06"
7	Brendan Canty (AUS)	Drapac Professional Cycling	+ 3' 23"
8	Bakhtiyar Kozhatayev (KAZ)	Astana	+ 3' 31"
9	Markus Eibegger (AUT)	Team Felbermayr–Simplon Wels	+ 3' 42"
10	Marco Minnaard (NED)	Wanty–Groupe Gobert	+ 3' 53"

=== Stage 5 ===
7 July 2016 — Millstatt to Dobratsch, 147.3 km (91.5 mi)

Result of Stage 5
Rank	Rider	Team	Time
1	Simone Sterbini (ITA)	Bardiani–CSF	3h 36' 43"
2	David Belda (ESP)	Team Roth	+ 2' 02"
3	Markus Eibegger (AUT)	Team Felbermayr–Simplon Wels	+ 2' 06"
4	Delio Fernández (ESP)	Delko–Marseille Provence KTM	+ 2' 12"
5	Guillaume Martin (FRA)	Wanty–Groupe Gobert	+ 2' 12"
6	Aleksey Rybalkin (RUS)	Gazprom–RusVelo	+ 2' 12"
7	Jan Hirt (CZE)	CCC–Sprandi–Polkowice	+ 2' 12"
8	Antwan Tolhoek (NED)	Roompot–Oranje Peloton	+ 2' 12"
9	Patrick Schelling (SUI)	Team Vorarlberg	+ 2' 12"
10	Stéphane Rossetto (FRA)	Cofidis	+ 2' 12"

General classification after Stage 5
Rank	Rider	Team	Time
1	Jan Hirt (CZE)	CCC–Sprandi–Polkowice	22h 46' 30"
2	Guillaume Martin (FRA)	Wanty–Groupe Gobert	+ 1' 17"
3	Patrick Schelling (SUI)	Team Vorarlberg	+ 1' 29"
4	Delio Fernández (ESP)	Delko–Marseille; Provence KTM	+ 1' 33"
5	Stéphane Rossetto (FRA)	Cofidis	+ 1' 49"
6	Hermann Pernsteiner (AUT)	Amplatz–BMC	+ 2' 11"
7	Brendan Canty (AUS)	Drapac Professional Cycling	+ 3' 28"
8	Markus Eibegger (AUT)	Team Felbermayr–Simplon Wels	+ 3' 32"
9	David Belda (ESP)	Team Roth	+ 3' 50"
10	Marco Minnaard (NED)	Wanty–Groupe Gobert	+ 3' 58"

=== Stage 6 ===
8 July 2016 — Graz to Stegersbach, 204.3 km (126.9 mi)

Result of Stage 6
Rank	Rider	Team	Time
1	Nicola Ruffoni (ITA)	Bardiani–CSF	4h 41' 51"
2	Daniel Auer (AUT)	Team Felbermayr–Simplon Wels	s.t.
3	Sylwester Janiszewski (POL)	Wibatech–Fuji	s.t.
4	Sjoerd van Ginneken (NED)	Roompot–Oranje Peloton	s.t.
5	Anthony Turgis (FRA)	Cofidis	s.t.
6	Frederik Backaert (BEL)	Wanty–Groupe Gobert	s.t.
7	Evaldas Šiškevičius (LTU)	Delko–Marseille Provence KTM	s.t.
8	Andrea Pasqualon (ITA)	Team Roth	s.t.
9	Francesc Zurita (ESP)	Team Vorarlberg	s.t.
10	Patryk Stosz (POL)	CCC–Sprandi–Polkowice	s.t.

General classification after Stage 6
Rank	Rider	Team	Time
1	Jan Hirt (CZE)	CCC–Sprandi–Polkowice	27h 28' 21"
2	Guillaume Martin (FRA)	Wanty–Groupe Gobert	+ 1' 17"
3	Patrick Schelling (SUI)	Team Vorarlberg	+ 1' 29"
4	Delio Fernández (ESP)	Delko–Marseille; Provence KTM	+ 1' 31"
5	Stéphane Rossetto (FRA)	Cofidis	+ 1' 49"
6	Hermann Pernsteiner (AUT)	Amplatz–BMC	+ 2' 11"
7	Brendan Canty (AUS)	Drapac Professional Cycling	+ 3' 28"
8	Markus Eibegger (AUT)	Team Felbermayr–Simplon Wels	+ 3' 32"
9	David Belda (ESP)	Team Roth	+ 3' 50"
10	Marco Minnaard (NED)	Wanty–Groupe Gobert	+ 3' 58"

=== Stage 7 ===
9 July 2016 — Bad Tatzmannsdorf to Vienna (Kahlenberg), 179.8 km (111.7 mi)

Result of Stage 7
Rank	Rider	Team	Time
1	Frederik Backaert (BEL)	Wanty–Groupe Gobert	3h 23' 34"
2	Markus Eibegger (AUT)	Team Felbermayr–Simplon Wels	+ 9"
3	David Belda (ESP)	Team Roth	+ 14"
4	Delio Fernández (ESP)	Delko–Marseille Provence KTM	+ 14"
5	Clemens Fankhauser (AUT)	Tirol Cycling Team	+ 14"
6	Guillaume Martin (FRA)	Wanty–Groupe Gobert	+ 14"
7	Rudy Molard (FRA)	Cofidis	+ 14"
8	Stéphane Rossetto (FRA)	Cofidis	+ 14"
9	Patrick Schelling (SUI)	Team Vorarlberg	+ 14"
10	Brendan Canty (AUS)	Drapac Professional Cycling	+ 14"

General classification after Stage 7
Rank	Rider	Team	Time
1	Jan Hirt (CZE)	CCC–Sprandi–Polkowice	30h 52' 09"
2	Guillaume Martin (FRA)	Wanty–Groupe Gobert	+ 1' 17"
3	Patrick Schelling (SUI)	Team Vorarlberg	+ 1' 29"
4	Delio Fernández (ESP)	Delko–Marseille; Provence KTM	+ 1' 31"
5	Stéphane Rossetto (FRA)	Cofidis	+ 1' 49"
6	Hermann Pernsteiner (AUT)	Amplatz–BMC	+ 2' 21"
7	Markus Eibegger (AUT)	Team Felbermayr–Simplon Wels	+ 3' 21"
8	Brendan Canty (AUS)	Drapac Professional Cycling	+ 3' 28"
9	David Belda (ESP)	Team Roth	+ 3' 46"
10	Marco Minnaard (NED)	Wanty–Groupe Gobert	+ 4' 19"

== Classification leadership ==
Stage	Winner	General classification Führungstrikot	Mountains classification Bergtrikot	Points classification Punktetrikot	Best Austrian rider bester Österreicher	Team classification
P	Will Clarke	Will Clarke	Will Clarke	not awarded	Lukas Schlemmer	Astana
1	Nicola Ruffoni	Nicola Ruffoni	Alessandro Vanotti	Nicola Ruffoni	Lukas Schlemmer	Astana
2	Clément Venturini	Andrea Pasqualon	Jacek Morajko	Andrea Pasqualon	Clemens Fankhauser	Astana
3	Brendan Canty	Markus Eibegger	Alessandro Vanotti	Andrea Pasqualon	Markus Eibegger	CCC–Sprandi–Polkowice
4	Jan Hirt	Jan Hirt	Alessandro Vanotti	Andrea Pasqualon	Hermann Pernsteiner	Wanty–Groupe Gobert
5	Simone Sterbini	Jan Hirt	Jan Hirt	Matthias Krizek	Hermann Pernsteiner	Wanty–Groupe Gobert
6	Nicola Ruffoni	Jan Hirt	Alessandro Vanotti	Andrea Pasqualon	Hermann Pernsteiner	Wanty–Groupe Gobert
7	Frederik Backaert	Jan Hirt	Alessandro Vanotti	Frederik Backaert	Hermann Pernsteiner	Wanty–Groupe Gobert
Final		Jan Hirt	Alessandro Vanotti	Frederik Backaert	Hermann Pernsteiner	Wanty–Groupe Gobert

== Final standings ==
Legend
General classification	Denotes the leader of the General classification	Mountains classification	Denotes the leader of the Mountains classification
Points classification	Denotes the leader of the Points classification	Best Austrian rider classification	Denotes the leader of the Best Austrian rider classification

=== General classification ===
	Rider	Team	Time
1	Jan Hirt (CZE)	CCC–Sprandi–Polkowice	30h 52' 09"
2	Guillaume Martin (FRA)	Wanty–Groupe Gobert	+ 1' 17"
3	Patrick Schelling (SUI)	Team Vorarlberg	+ 1' 29"
4	Delio Fernández (ESP)	Delko–Marseille Provence KTM	+ 1' 31"
5	Stéphane Rossetto (FRA)	Cofidis	+ 1' 49"
6	Hermann Pernsteiner (AUT)	Amplatz–BMC	+ 2' 21"
7	Markus Eibegger (AUT)	Team Felbermayr–Simplon Wels	+ 3' 21"
8	Brendan Canty (AUS)	Drapac Professional Cycling	+ 3' 28"
9	David Belda (ESP)	Team Roth	+ 3' 46"
10	Marco Minnaard (NED)	Wanty–Groupe Gobert	+ 4' 19"

=== Mountains classification ===
	Rider	Team	Points
1	Alessandro Vanotti (ITA)	Astana	34
2	David Belda (ESP)	Team Roth	24
3	Jan Hirt (CZE)	CCC–Sprandi–Polkowice	23
4	Maximilian Kuen (AUT)	Amplatz–BMC	18
5	Marcin Mrożek (POL)	CCC–Sprandi–Polkowice	14
6	Simone Sterbini (ITA)	Bardiani–CSF	12
7	Brendan Canty (AUS)	Drapac Professional Cycling	12
8	Nick van der Lijke (NED)	Roompot–Oranje Peloton	11
9	Patrick Schelling (SUI)	Team Vorarlberg	10
10	Aleksey Rybalkin (RUS)	Gazprom–RusVelo	10

=== Points classification ===
	Rider	Team	Points
1	Frederik Backaert (BEL)	Wanty–Groupe Gobert	41
2	Delio Fernández (ESP)	Delko–Marseille Provence KTM	34
3	Markus Eibegger (AUT)	Team Felbermayr–Simplon Wels	34
4	David Belda (ESP)	Team Roth	34
5	Andrea Pasqualon (ITA)	Team Roth	32
6	Guillaume Martin (FRA)	Wanty–Groupe Gobert	30
7	Matthias Krizek (AUT)	Team Roth	27
8	Jan Hirt (CZE)	CCC–Sprandi–Polkowice	26
9	Clément Venturini (FRA)	Cofidis	23
10	Sjoerd van Ginneken (NED)	Roompot–Oranje Peloton	23

=== Best Austrian rider classification ===
	Rider	Team	Time
1	Hermann Pernsteiner	Amplatz–BMC	30h 54' 30"
2	Markus Eibegger	Team Felbermayr–Simplon Wels	+ 1' 00"
3	Clemens Fankhauser	Tirol Cycling Team	+ 3' 49"
4	Stephan Rabitsch	Team Felbermayr–Simplon Wels	+ 13' 11"
5	Sebastian Schönberger	Tirol Cycling Team	+ 20' 02"
6	Dominik Hrinkow	Hrinkow Advarics Cycleangteam	+ 22' 27"
7	Matthias Krizek	Team Roth	+ 23' 52"
8	Hans-Jörg Leopold	WSA–Greenlife	+ 33' 45"
9	Patrick Bosman	Tirol Cycling Team	+ 38' 45"
10	Stefan Pöll	WSA–Greenlife	+ 42' 45"

=== Team classification ===
	Team	Time
1	Wanty–Groupe Gobert	92h 46' 16"
2	Drapac Professional Cycling	+ 21' 13"
3	CCC–Sprandi–Polkowice	+ 23' 17"
4	Bardiani–CSF	+ 27' 10"
5	Amplatz–BMC	+ 29' 19"
6	Cofidis	+ 33' 31"
7	Adria Mobil	+ 34' 21"
8	Delko–Marseille Provence KTM	+ 36' 59"
9	Team Roth	+ 37' 11"
10	Roompot–Oranje Peloton	+ 44' 33"
