= Brendan Canty (disambiguation) =

Brendan Canty (born 1966) is an American musician, composer, producer and filmmaker.

Brendan Canty may also refer to:

- Brendan Canty (cyclist) (born 1992), Australian former professional road racing cyclist
- Brendan Canty, Irish film director who made the 2025 drama film Christy
