= 2017 Vuelta a Andalucía =

2017 UCI Europe Tour

Race details
- Dates: 15–19 February 2017
- Stages: 5
- Distance: 675.9 km (420.0 mi)
- Winning time: 17h 12' 23"

Results
Jersey awarded to the overall winner	Winner	Alejandro Valverde (Spain)	(Movistar Team)
	Second	Alberto Contador (Spain)	(Trek–Segafredo)
	Third	Thibaut Pinot (France)	(FDJ)
Jersey awarded to the points classification winner	Points	Alejandro Valverde (Spain)	(Movistar Team)
Jersey awarded to the mountains classification winner	Mountains	Georg Preidler (Austria)	(Team Sunweb)
Jersey awarded to the sprints classification winner	Sprints	Marco Minnaard (Netherlands)	(Wanty–Groupe Gobert)
	Team	Team Sky	

The 2017 Vuelta a Andalucía was a road cycling stage race that took place in Andalusia between 15 and 19 February 2017. The race was rated as a 2.HC event as part of the 2017 UCI Europe Tour, and was the 63rd edition of the Vuelta a Andalucía.

The five-stage race was won for a record-extending fifth time – in six years – by Alejandro Valverde of the Movistar Team, taking the 100th victory of his professional career in the process. Valverde won the opening stage of the race, and after losing the lead to Trek–Segafredo's Alberto Contador the following day, Valverde re-assumed the lead of the race by finishing second to Victor Campenaerts (LottoNL–Jumbo) in the third stage time trial; Valverde was able to maintain a lead of one second over Contador for the remainder of the race. The podium was completed by Thibaut Pinot, who finished five seconds further back in third place for the FDJ team.

With consistent finishing during the race, Valverde was also able to win the points and combination classifications, and was the best-placed Spanish rider. Georg Preidler won the green jersey for the mountains classification, riding for Team Sunweb, while Wanty–Groupe Gobert rider Marco Minnaard won the white jersey for the intermediate sprints classification. The teams classification was won by Team Sky, with three of the squad's riders – Wout Poels, Diego Rosa and Mikel Landa – in fourth, fifth and sixth overall respectively.

== Teams ==
21 teams were invited to take part in the race. These included nine UCI WorldTeams, ten UCI Professional Continental teams and two UCI Continental teams.

UCI WorldTeams

- Bahrain–Merida
- Cannondale–Drapac
- FDJ
- Lotto–Soudal
- LottoNL–Jumbo
- Movistar Team
- Team Sky
- Team Sunweb
- Trek–Segafredo

UCI Professional Continental teams

- Caja Rural–Seguros RGA
- CCC–Sprandi–Polkowice
- Cofidis
- Direct Énergie
- Gazprom–RusVelo
- Israel Cycling Academy
- Roompot–Nederlandse Loterij
- Sport Vlaanderen–Baloise
- Vérandas Willems–Crelan
- Wanty–Groupe Gobert

UCI Continental teams

- Burgos BH
- Euskadi Basque Country–Murias

== Route ==
Stage schedule
Stage	Date	Route	Distance	Type	Winner
1	15 February	Rincón de la Victoria to Granada	155 km (96 mi)	Medium-mountain stage	Alejandro Valverde (ESP)
2	16 February	Torredonjimeno to Mancha Real	179 km (111 mi)	Mountain stage	Thibaut Pinot (FRA)
3	17 February	Lucena to Lucena	11.9 km (7 mi)	Individual time trial	Victor Campenaerts (BEL)
4	18 February	La Campana to Seville	178.5 km (111 mi)	Flat stage	Bryan Coquard (FRA)
5	19 February	Setenil de las Bodegas to Coín	151.5 km (94 mi)	Hilly stage	Tim Wellens (BEL)

== Stages ==
=== Stage 1 ===
15 February 2017 — Rincón de la Victoria to Granada, 155 km (96 mi)

Result of Stage 1 & General classification after Stage 1
Rank	Rider	Team	Time
1	Alejandro Valverde (ESP)	Movistar Team	4h 02' 28"
2	Wout Poels (NED)	Team Sky	+ 0"
3	Sébastien Reichenbach (SUI)	FDJ	+ 0"
4	Diego Rosa (ITA)	Team Sky	+ 0"
5	Ion Izagirre (ESP)	Bahrain–Merida	+ 0"
6	Alberto Contador (ESP)	Trek–Segafredo	+ 0"
7	Thibaut Pinot (FRA)	FDJ	+ 5"
8	Mikel Landa (ESP)	Team Sky	+ 5"
9	Rigoberto Urán (COL)	Cannondale–Drapac	+ 5"
10	Warren Barguil (FRA)	Team Sunweb	+ 5"

=== Stage 2 ===
16 February 2017 — Torredonjimeno to Mancha Real, 179 km (111 mi)

Result of Stage 2
Rank	Rider	Team	Time
1	Thibaut Pinot (FRA)	FDJ	4h 44' 03"
2	Alberto Contador (ESP)	Trek–Segafredo	+ 2"
3	Alejandro Valverde (ESP)	Movistar Team	+ 7"
4	Ion Izagirre (ESP)	Bahrain–Merida	+ 7"
5	Mikel Landa (ESP)	Team Sky	+ 9"
6	Diego Rosa (ITA)	Team Sky	+ 9"
7	Wout Poels (NED)	Team Sky	+ 13"
8	Sébastien Reichenbach (SUI)	FDJ	+ 28"
9	Pieter Weening (NED)	Roompot–Nederlandse Loterij	+ 46"
10	Floris De Tier (BEL)	LottoNL–Jumbo	+ 46"

General classification after Stage 2
Rank	Rider	Team	Time
1	Alberto Contador (ESP)	Trek–Segafredo	8h 46' 33"
2	Thibaut Pinot (FRA)	FDJ	+ 3"
3	Alejandro Valverde (ESP)	Movistar Team	+ 5"
4	Ion Izagirre (ESP)	Bahrain–Merida	+ 5"
5	Diego Rosa (ITA)	Team Sky	+ 7"
6	Wout Poels (NED)	Team Sky	+ 11"
7	Mikel Landa (ESP)	Team Sky	+ 12"
8	Sébastien Reichenbach (SUI)	FDJ	+ 26"
9	Rigoberto Urán (COL)	Cannondale–Drapac	+ 49"
10	Pieter Weening (NED)	Roompot–Nederlandse Loterij	+ 1' 08"

=== Stage 3 ===
17 February 2017 — Lucena to Lucena, 11.9 km (7 mi), Individual time trial (ITT)

Result of Stage 3
Rank	Rider	Team	Time
1	Victor Campenaerts (BEL)	LottoNL–Jumbo	14' 55"
2	Alejandro Valverde (ESP)	Movistar Team	+ 1"
3	Alberto Contador (ESP)	Trek–Segafredo	+ 7"
4	Thibaut Pinot (FRA)	FDJ	+ 9"
5	Fabio Felline (ITA)	Trek–Segafredo	+ 9"
6	Wout Poels (NED)	Team Sky	+ 16"
7	Tim Wellens (BEL)	Lotto–Soudal	+ 20"
8	Vasil Kiryienka (BLR)	Team Sky	+ 21"
9	Tobias Ludvigsson (SWE)	FDJ	+ 25"
10	Matthias Brändle (AUT)	Trek–Segafredo	+ 28"

General classification after Stage 3
Rank	Rider	Team	Time
1	Alejandro Valverde (ESP)	Movistar Team	9h 01' 34"
2	Alberto Contador (ESP)	Trek–Segafredo	+ 1"
3	Thibaut Pinot (FRA)	FDJ	+ 6"
4	Wout Poels (NED)	Team Sky	+ 21"
5	Diego Rosa (ITA)	Team Sky	+ 45"
6	Mikel Landa (ESP)	Team Sky	+ 48"
7	Sébastien Reichenbach (SUI)	FDJ	+ 52"
8	Rigoberto Urán (COL)	Cannondale–Drapac	+ 1' 29"
9	Ondřej Cink (CZE)	Bahrain–Merida	+ 1' 48"
10	Javier Moreno (ESP)	Bahrain–Merida	+ 1' 50"

=== Stage 4 ===
18 February 2017 — La Campana to Seville, 178.5 km (111 mi)

Result of Stage 4
Rank	Rider	Team	Time
1	Bryan Coquard (FRA)	Direct Énergie	4h 10' 33"
2	Daniel Hoelgaard (NOR)	FDJ	+ 0"
3	Hugo Hofstetter (FRA)	Cofidis	+ 0"
4	Moreno Hofland (NED)	Lotto–Soudal	+ 0"
5	Raymond Kreder (NED)	Roompot–Nederlandse Loterij	+ 0"
6	Mihkel Räim (EST)	Israel Cycling Academy	+ 0"
7	Roman Maikin (RUS)	Gazprom–RusVelo	+ 0"
8	Maxime Farazijn (BEL)	Sport Vlaanderen–Baloise	+ 0"
9	Rigoberto Urán (COL)	Cannondale–Drapac	+ 0"
10	Eduard Prades (ESP)	Caja Rural–Seguros RGA	+ 0"

General classification after Stage 4
Rank	Rider	Team	Time
1	Alejandro Valverde (ESP)	Movistar Team	13h 12' 07"
2	Alberto Contador (ESP)	Trek–Segafredo	+ 1"
3	Thibaut Pinot (FRA)	FDJ	+ 6"
4	Wout Poels (NED)	Team Sky	+ 21"
5	Diego Rosa (ITA)	Team Sky	+ 45"
6	Mikel Landa (ESP)	Team Sky	+ 48"
7	Sébastien Reichenbach (SUI)	FDJ	+ 52"
8	Rigoberto Urán (COL)	Cannondale–Drapac	+ 1' 29"
9	Ondřej Cink (CZE)	Bahrain–Merida	+ 1' 48"
10	Javier Moreno (ESP)	Bahrain–Merida	+ 1' 50"

=== Stage 5 ===
19 February 2017 — Setenil de las Bodegas to Coín, 151.5 km (94 mi)

Result of Stage 5
Rank	Rider	Team	Time
1	Tim Wellens (BEL)	Lotto–Soudal	3h 58' 31"
2	Simon Clarke (AUS)	Cannondale–Drapac	+ 0"
3	Victor Campenaerts (BEL)	LottoNL–Jumbo	+ 0"
4	Maciej Paterski (POL)	CCC–Sprandi–Polkowice	+ 0"
5	Domen Novak (SLO)	Bahrain–Merida	+ 0"
6	Nick van der Lijke (NED)	Roompot–Nederlandse Loterij	+ 0"
7	Marco Minnaard (NED)	Wanty–Groupe Gobert	+ 1' 34"
8	Héctor Sáez (ESP)	Caja Rural–Seguros RGA	+ 1' 45"
9	Iván García (ESP)	Bahrain–Merida	+ 1' 45"
10	Hugo Hofstetter (FRA)	Cofidis	+ 1' 45"

Final general classification
Rank	Rider	Team	Time
1	Alejandro Valverde (ESP)	Movistar Team	17h 12' 23"
2	Alberto Contador (ESP)	Trek–Segafredo	+ 1"
3	Thibaut Pinot (FRA)	FDJ	+ 6"
4	Wout Poels (NED)	Team Sky	+ 21"
5	Diego Rosa (ITA)	Team Sky	+ 45"
6	Mikel Landa (ESP)	Team Sky	+ 48"
7	Sébastien Reichenbach (SUI)	FDJ	+ 52"
8	Rigoberto Urán (COL)	Cannondale–Drapac	+ 1' 29"
9	Ondřej Cink (CZE)	Bahrain–Merida	+ 1' 48"
10	Javier Moreno (ESP)	Bahrain–Merida	+ 1' 50"

== Classification leadership table ==
In the 2017 Vuelta a Andalucía, four different jerseys were awarded. For the general classification, calculated by adding each cyclist's finishing times on each stage, the leader received a red jersey. This classification was considered the most important of the 2017 Vuelta a Andalucía, and the winner of the classification was considered the winner of the race.

Additionally, there was a points classification, which awarded a yellow jersey. In the points classification, cyclists received points for finishing in the top 15 in a stage. For winning a stage, a rider earned 25 points, with 20 for second, 16 for third, 13 for fourth, 11 for fifth with a point fewer per place down to a single point for 15th place. There was also a sprints classification for the points awarded at designated intermediate sprints, where the leadership of which was marked by a white jersey.

The fourth jersey represented the mountains classification, the leadership of which was marked by a green jersey. In the mountains classification, points were won by reaching the top of a climb before other cyclists, with more points available for the higher-categorised climbs. There was also a classification for teams, in which the times of the best three cyclists per team on each stage were added together; the leading team at the end of the race was the team with the lowest total time.

Stage	Winner	General classification	Mountains classification	Sprints classification	Points classification	Teams classification
1	Alejandro Valverde	Alejandro Valverde	Georg Preidler	Daniel Turek	Alejandro Valverde	Team Sky
2	Thibaut Pinot	Alberto Contador	Georg Preidler	Daniel Turek	Alejandro Valverde	Team Sky
3	Victor Campenaerts	Alejandro Valverde	Georg Preidler	Daniel Turek	Alejandro Valverde	Team Sky
4	Bryan Coquard	Alejandro Valverde	Georg Preidler	Daniel Turek	Alejandro Valverde	Team Sky
5	Tim Wellens	Alejandro Valverde	Georg Preidler	Marco Minnaard	Alejandro Valverde	Team Sky
Final		Alejandro Valverde	Georg Preidler	Marco Minnaard	Alejandro Valverde	Team Sky
