= Javier Moreno (cyclist) =

Spanish racing cyclist (born 1984)

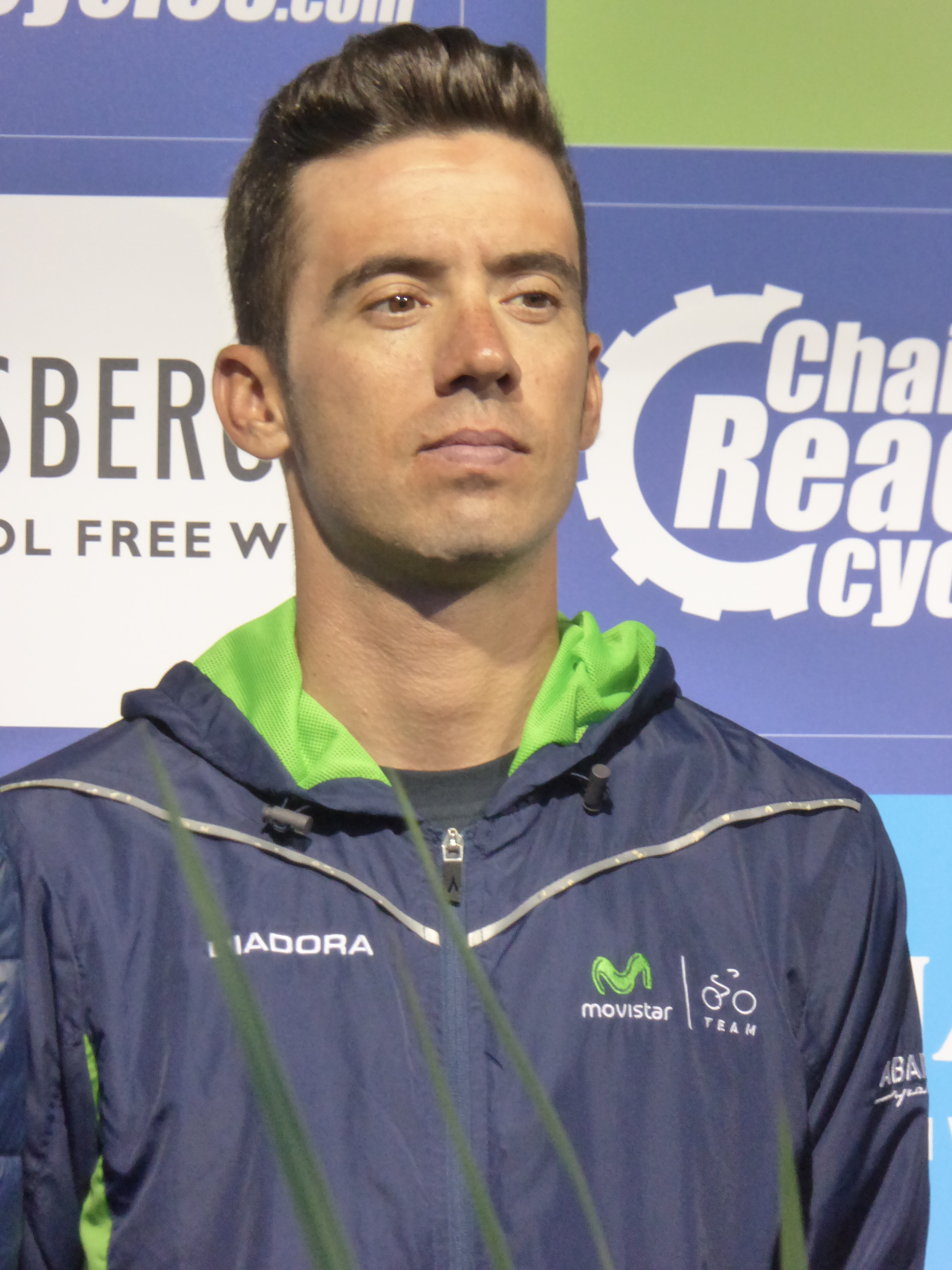
- Moreno at the 2016 Tour of Britain.

Personal information
- Full name: Javier Moreno Bazán
- Nickname: Javi
- Born: 18 July 1984 (age 42) Jaén, Spain
- Height: 181 cm (5 ft 11 in)
- Weight: 63 kg (139 lb; 9.9 st)

Cycling career
- Sport: Cycling
- Current team: Anicolor / Campicarn
- Disciplines: Road; Mountain biking
- Role: Rider
- Rider type: Climber; Puncheur

Amateur teams
- 2003–2005: Ávila Rojas
- 2006: Grupo Nicolas Mateos
- 2007: Spiuk–Extremadura
- 2020: Sport Bike

Professional teams
- 2008–2010: Andalucía–Cajasur
- 2011: Caja Rural
- 2012–2016: Movistar Team
- 2017: Bahrain–Merida
- 2018–2019: Delko–Marseille Provence KTM
- 2021–: Efapel

Major wins
- Grand Tours Vuelta a España 2 TTT stages (2012, 2014)

Javier Moreno Bazán (born 18 July 1984) is a Spanish professional cyclist, who currently rides for UCI Continental team Anicolor / Campicarn. Prior to this, Moreno has also competed for the Andalucía–Cajasur, Caja Rural, Movistar Team, Bahrain–Merida and Delko–Marseille Provence teams.

== Career ==
Moreno was born in Jaén. In 2009, Moreno won the third annual Criterium Ciudad de Jaén race, an unofficial two-day competition held during the off-season of the UCI World Tour circuit.

Moreno was named in the start list for the 2016 Giro d'Italia, but abandoned the race on Stage 7. After five years with Movistar, in September 2016 Moreno announced that he would join Bahrain–Merida for the 2017 season, with a role as a domestique for Vincenzo Nibali and with his main focus for the season being the Giro d'Italia. At the Giro d'Italia, he was disqualified on stage 4 of the race, after pushing Diego Rosa. In June 2017, he was named in the startlist for the Tour de France.

== Major results ==
2005
1st Road race, National Under-23 Road Championships
2007
1st Stage 4 Vuelta a la Comunidad de Madrid
7th Clásica a los Puertos de Guadarrama
8th GP Miguel Induráin
8th Prueba Villafranca de Ordizia
9th Overall Vuelta a Burgos
10th Subida al Naranco
2008
6th Clásica a los Puertos de Guadarrama
9th Subida al Naranco
2009
3rd Overall Vuelta a Asturias
2010
5th Klasika Primavera
6th Overall Vuelta a Castilla y León
2011
1st Overall Vuelta a Asturias

1st Stage 3

2nd Overall Vuelta a la Comunidad de Madrid
7th GP Miguel Induráin
9th Klasika Primavera
2012
1st Overall Vuelta a Castilla y León

1st Points classification
1st Combativity classification

1st Stage 1 (TTT) Vuelta a España
5th Overall Vuelta a Burgos
8th Overall Tour Down Under
2013
1st Vuelta a la Comunidad de Madrid
2nd Overall Tour Down Under

1st Mountains classification

3rd Overall Vuelta a Asturias

1st Stage 2

2014
1st Stage 1 (TTT) Vuelta a España
2nd Overall Tour of Austria
5th Overall Vuelta a Castilla y León
10th Prueba Villafranca de Ordizia
2015
1st Stage 1b (ITT) Vuelta a Andalucia
6th Overall Vuelta a la Comunidad de Madrid
7th Overall Vuelta a Castilla y León
9th Overall Vuelta a Asturias
2016
4th Prueba Villafranca de Ordizia
5th Overall Volta a la Comunitat Valenciana
6th Overall Circuit de la Sarthe
2017
10th Overall Vuelta a Andalucía
2018
1st Overall Sharjah International Cycling Tour
1st Overall Vuelta a Aragón
6th Overall Tour de l'Ain

1st Stage 2

6th Overall Tour of Austria
2019
6th Mont Ventoux Dénivelé Challenge
9th Overall Tour de l'Ain
2021
5th Clássica da Arrábida

=== Grand Tour general classification results timeline ===
Grand Tour	2008	2009	2010	2011	2012	2013	2014	2015	2016	2017
Giro d'Italia	—	—	—	—	—	—	—	—	DNF	DSQ
Tour de France	—	—	—	—	—	—	—	—	—	119
Vuelta a España	21	—	51	—	66	76	90	80	—	DNF

Legend
—	Did not compete
DNF	Did not finish
