= Alessandro Vanotti =

Road bicycle racer

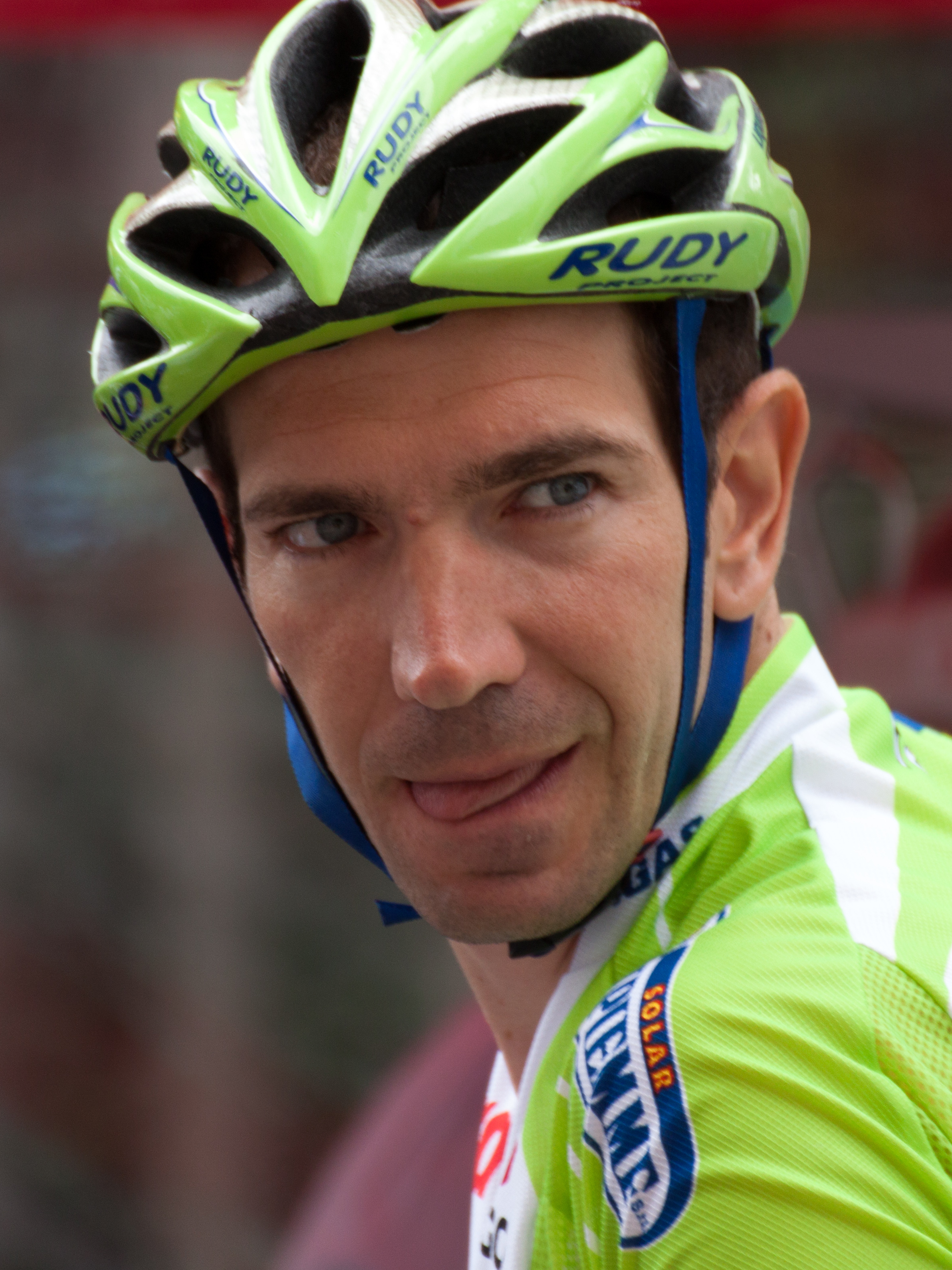
- Vanotti at the 2012 Critérium du Dauphiné

Personal information
- Full name: Alessandro Vanotti
- Born: 16 September 1980 (age 46) Bergamo, Italy
- Height: 1.85 m (6 ft 1 in)
- Weight: 73 kg (161 lb)

Cycling career
- Sport: Cycling
- Discipline: Road
- Role: Rider

Professional teams
- 2004–2005: De Nardi
- 2006: Team Milram
- 2007–2012: Liquigas
- 2013–2016: Astana

Alessandro Vanotti (born 16 September 1980 in Bergamo) is an Italian former professional road bicycle racer.

Vanotti rode the Tour de France 5 times. He left Liquigas–Cannondale at the end of the 2012 season and joined Astana on a two-year contract from the 2013 season onwards.

== Major results ==
2003
3rd Trofeo Franco Balestra
5th Gran Premio Industria e Commercio Artigianato Carnaghese
2005
9th GP Triberg-Schwarzwald
2007
Settimana Ciclistica Lombarda

1st Prologue (TTT) & 4

1st Stage 1 (TTT) Giro d'Italia
2008
1st Stage 1b (TTT) Settimana Internazionale di Coppi e Bartali
1st Stage 1 (TTT) Vuelta a España
2010
1st Stage 1b (TTT) Settimana Internazionale di Coppi e Bartali
1st Stage 4 (TTT) Giro d'Italia
2013
1st Stage 1 (TTT) Vuelta a España
2015
1st Stage 2 (TTT) Vuelta a Burgos
2016
1st Mountains classification Tour of Austria
1st Stage 2 (TTT) Vuelta a Burgos

=== Grand Tour general classification results timeline ===
Grand Tour	2004	2005	2006	2007	2008	2009	2010	2011	2012	2013	2014	2015	2016
Giro d'Italia	44	74	69	106	86	105	76	72	—	DNF	—	—	—
Tour de France	—	133	—	—	—	119	—	132	118	—	147	—	—
Vuelta a España	—	—	—	66	75	—	—	—	—	113	—	135	97

Legend
—	Did not compete
DNF	Did not finish
