= 2009 Vuelta a Asturias =

Race details
- Dates: 28 April–2 May 2009
- Stages: 5
- Distance: 799.7 km (496.9 mi)
- Winning time: 19h 19' 06"

Results
| Jersey awarded to the overall winner | Winner | Francisco Mancebo (ESP) | (Rock Racing) |
| | Second | Tiago Machado (POR) | (Madeinox–Boavista) |
| | Third | Javier Moreno (ESP) | (Andalucía–Cajasur) |

The 2009 Vuelta a Asturias was the 53rd edition of the Vuelta a Asturias road cycling stage race, which was held from 28 April to 2 May 2009. The race started and finished in Oviedo. The race was won by Francisco Mancebo of the Rock Racing team.

== General classification ==
Final general classification

| Rank | Rider | Team | Time |
|---|---|---|---|
| 1 | Francisco Mancebo (ESP) | Rock Racing | 19h 19' 06" |
| 2 | Tiago Machado (POR) | Madeinox–Boavista | + 24" |
| 3 | Javier Moreno (ESP) | Andalucía–Cajasur | + 39" |
| 4 | Nuno Ribeiro (POR) | Liberty Seguros | + 47" |
| 5 | Santiago Pérez (ESP) | Madeinox–Boavista | + 1' 12" |
| 6 | José Herrada (ESP) | Contentpolis–Ampo | + 2' 06" |
| 7 | Glen Chadwick (NZL) | Rock Racing | + 3' 06" |
| 8 | Amets Txurruka (ESP) | Euskaltel–Euskadi | + 3' 07" |
| 9 | Héctor Guerra (ESP) | Liberty Seguros | + 3' 08" |
| 10 | Samuel Sánchez (ESP) | Euskaltel–Euskadi | + 3' 11" |
