= Marco Minnaard =

Dutch cyclist

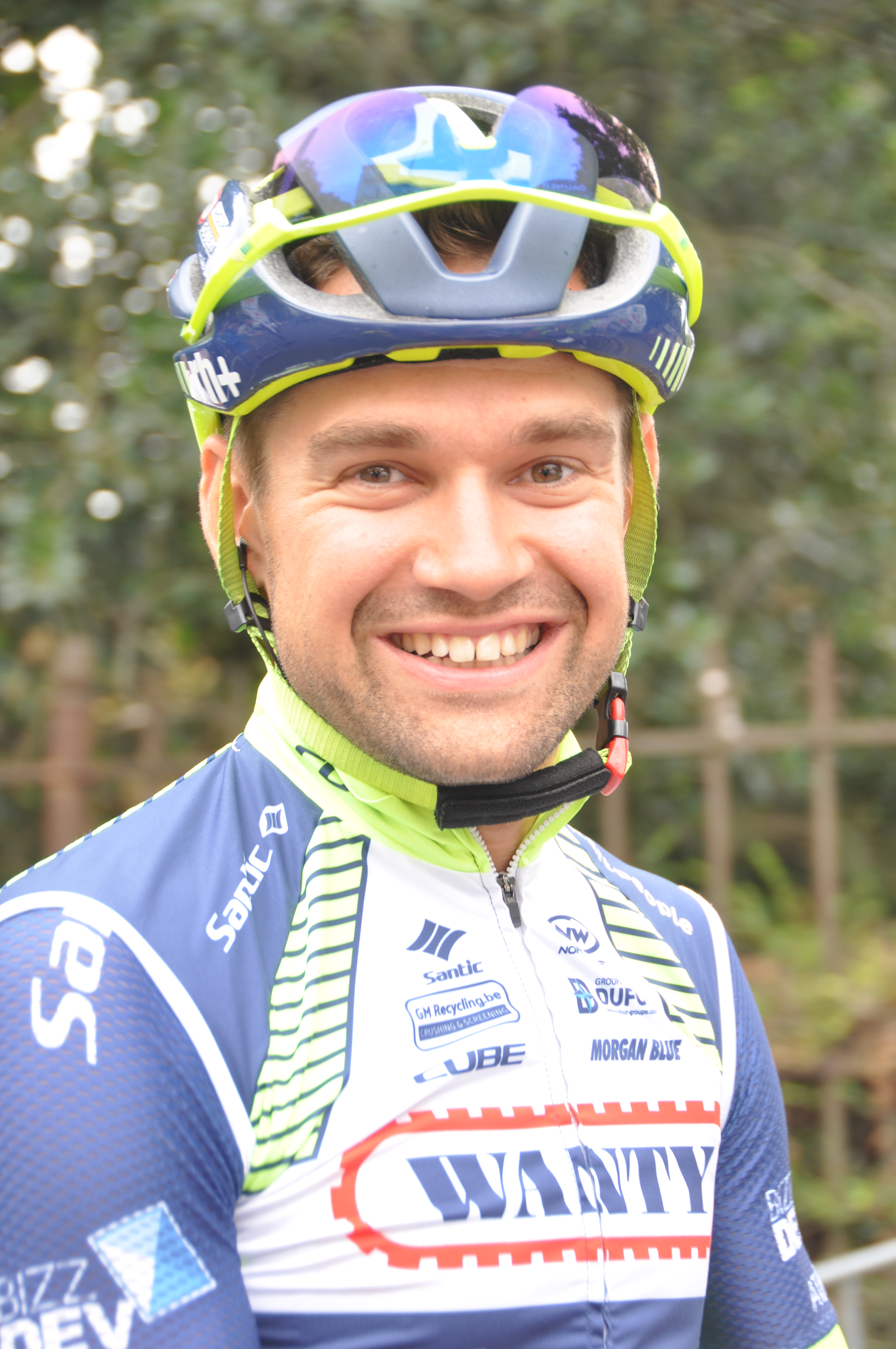
- Minnaard at the 2018 Deutschland Tour

Personal information
- Full name: Marinus Cornelis Minnaard
- Born: 11 April 1989 (age 37) Wemeldinge, Netherlands
- Height: 1.78 m (5 ft 10 in)
- Weight: 65 kg (143 lb; 10 st 3 lb)

Cycling career
- Sport: Cycling
- Disciplines: Road; Track
- Role: Rider

Professional teams
- 2012–2013: Rabobank Continental Team
- 2014–2019: Wanty–Groupe Gobert

Marinus Cornelis "Marco" Minnaard (born 11 April 1989 in Wemeldinge) is a Dutch former professional cyclist, who rode professionally between 2012 and 2019 for the Rabobank Development Team and Wanty–Gobert teams. In June 2017, he was named in the startlist for the Tour de France.

== Major results ==
2012
3rd Kattekoers
9th Overall Tour of China I
9th Ronde van Midden-Nederland
10th Grand Prix Pino Cerami
2014
1st Mountains classification La Tropicale Amissa Bongo
4th Tour de Vendée
2016
7th Overall Tour of Norway
10th Overall Tour of Austria
2017
1st Overall Rhône-Alpes Isère Tour

1st Points classification

1st Sprints classification Vuelta a Andalucía
9th Overall Tour du Limousin
2019
1st Mountains classification Tour Poitou-Charentes en Nouvelle-Aquitaine
9th Overall Rhône-Alpes Isère Tour

=== Grand Tour general classification results timeline ===
Grand Tour	2017	2018
Giro d'Italia	—	—
Tour de France	40	64
Vuelta a España	—	—

Legend
—	Did not compete
DNF	Did not finish
