= La Campana =

La Campana, Spain
- Municipality
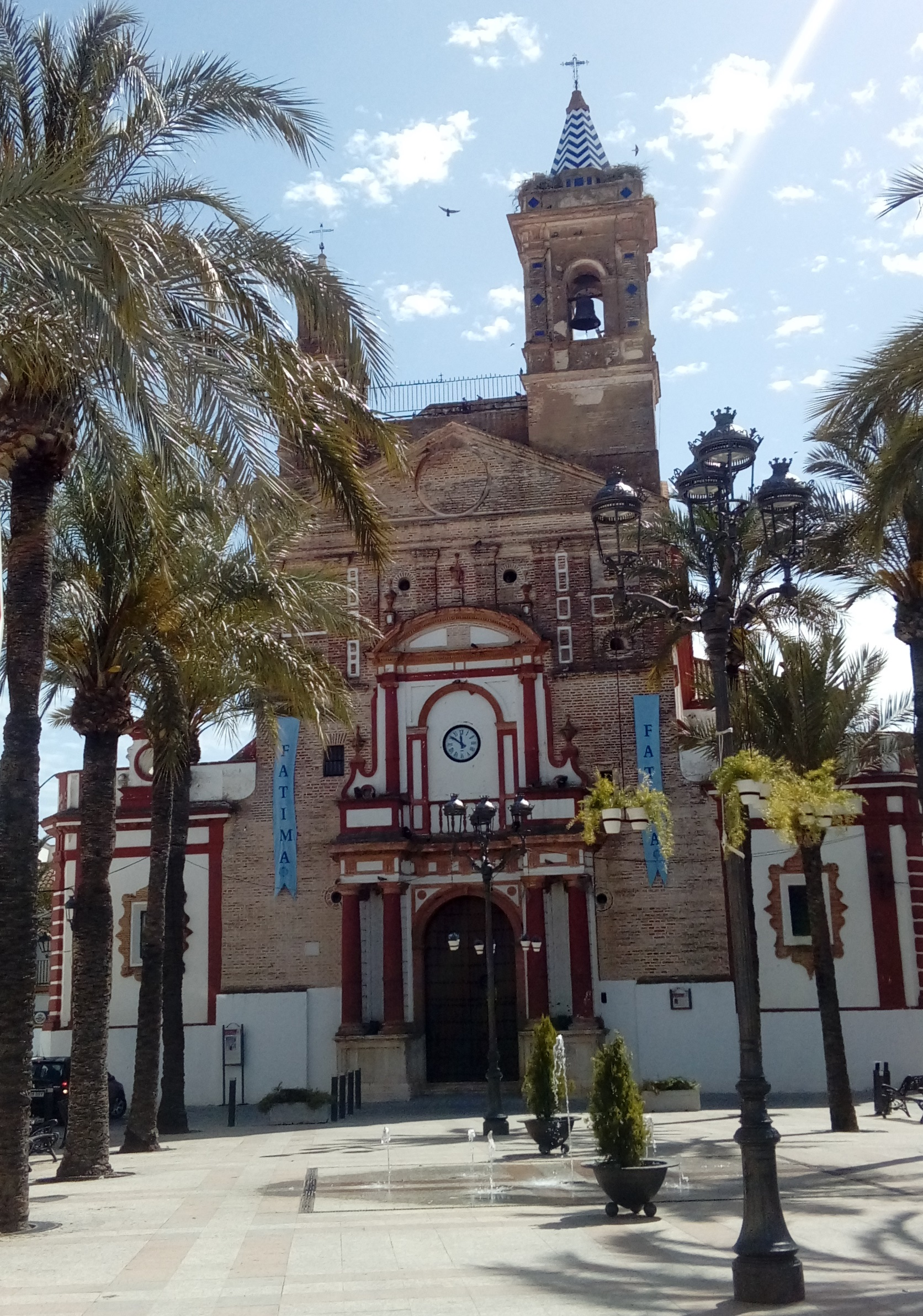
- The church of Santa María la Blanca in Plaza de Andalucía

- Flag Coat of arms
- Interactive map of La Campana, Spain
- Coordinates: 37°34′05″N 5°25′40″W
- Country: Spain
- Province: Seville
- Municipality: La Campana

Government
  - Mayor: Manuel Fernández Oviedo

Area
  - Total: 125 km^{2} (48 sq mi)
- Elevation: 134 m (440 ft)

Population (2025-01-01)
  - Total: 5,122
  - Density: 41.0/km^{2} (106/sq mi)
- Time zone: UTC+1 (CET)
  - Summer (DST): UTC+2 (CEST)
- Website: https://www.lacampana.es/

La Campana (Spanish pronunciation: [la kamˈpana]) is a town located in the province of Seville, Spain. It lies 56 kilometres (35 mi) from Seville, the capital of the province. According to the 2020 census (INE), the town had a population of 5,238 inhabitants.

== See also ==
- List of municipalities in Seville
