= Wenigzell =

- Municipality
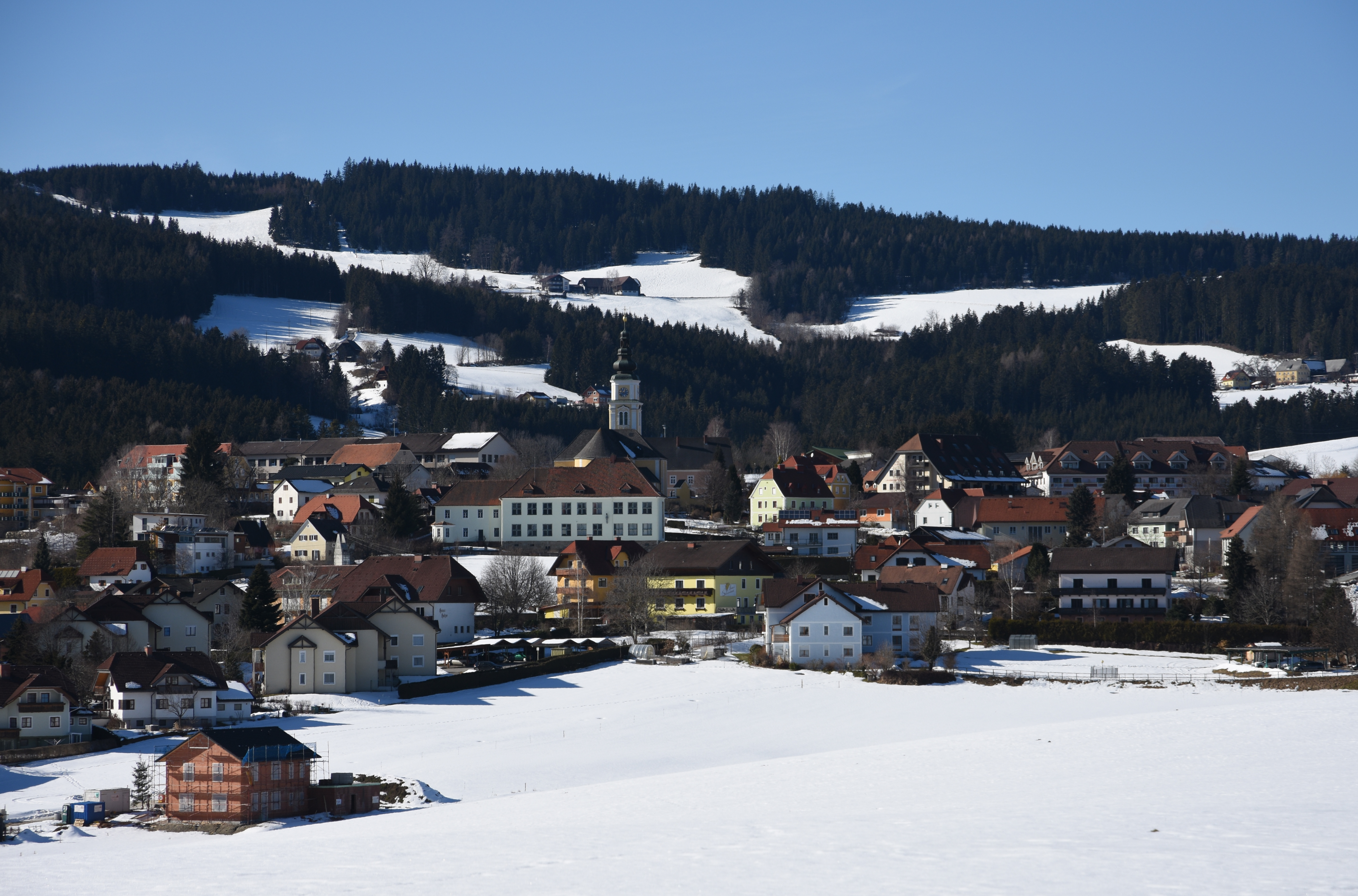
- Market square

- Coat of arms

- Location within Austria
- Coordinates: 47°25′00″N 15°47′00″E
- Country: Austria
- State: Styria
- District: Hartberg-Fürstenfeld

Government
  - Mayor: Herbert Berger (ÖVP)

Area
  - Total: 35.49 km^{2} (13.70 sq mi)
- Elevation: 831 m (2,726 ft)

Population (2018-01-01)
  - Total: 1,391
  - Density: 39.19/km^{2} (101.5/sq mi)
- Time zone: UTC+1 (CET)
  - Summer (DST): UTC+2 (CEST)
- Postal code: 8254
- Area code: 0 33 36
- Vehicle registration: HF
- Website: www.wenigzell. steiermark.at

Wenigzell is a municipality in the district of Hartberg-Fürstenfeld in Styria, Austria.
