= Nicola Ruffoni =

Italian cyclist

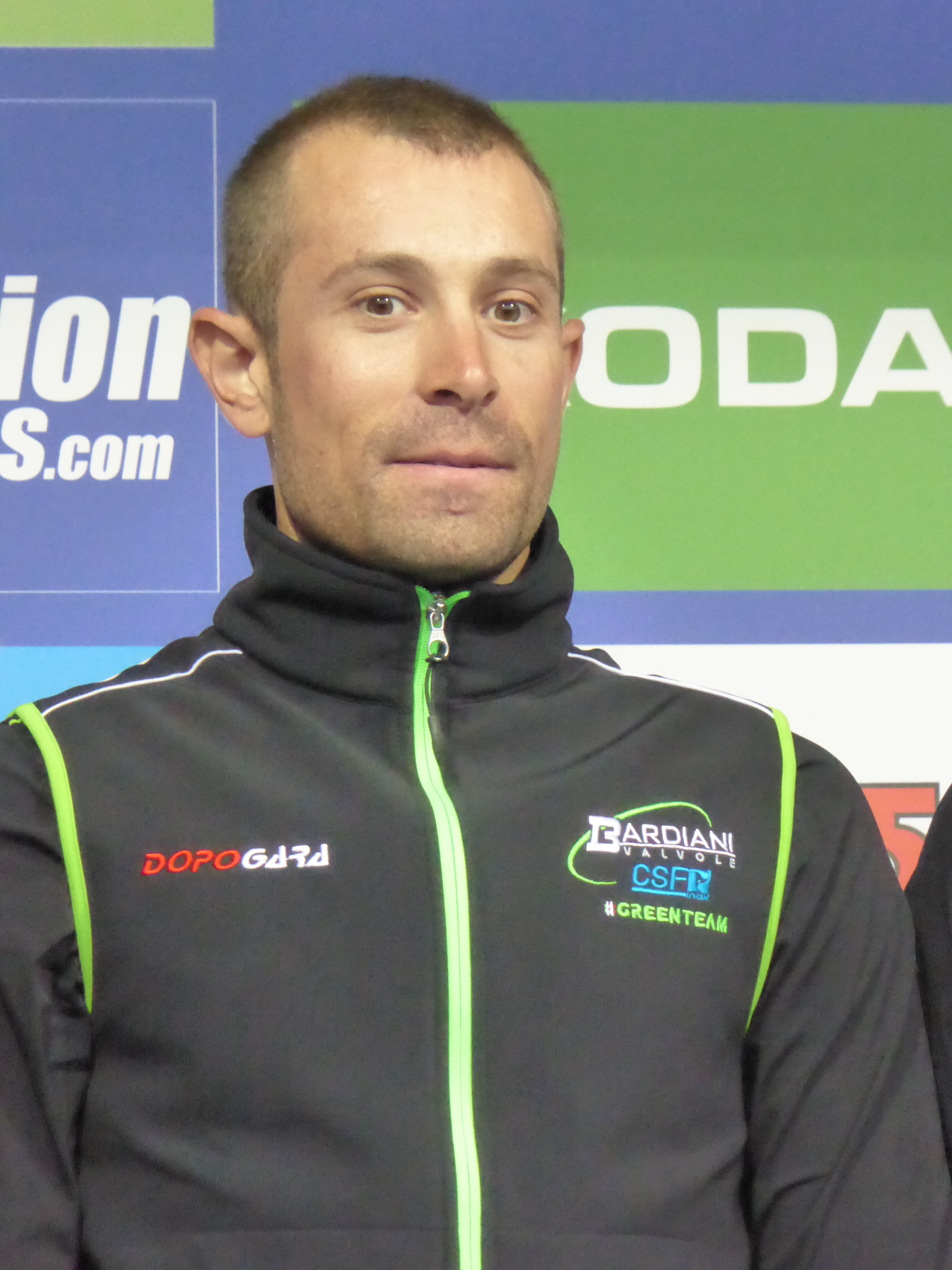
- Ruffoni at the 2016 Tour of Britain

Personal information
- Full name: Nicola Ruffoni
- Born: 14 December 1990 (age 35) Brescia, Italy
- Height: 1.73 m (5 ft 8 in)
- Weight: 70 kg (154 lb)

Cycling career
- Sport: Cycling
- Discipline: Road
- Role: Rider
- Rider type: Sprinter

Amateur teams
- 2007–2008: Aspiratori Otelli–Cas. Zani
- 2009–2010: G.S. Gavardo–Tecmor ASD
- 2011: Team Idea
- 2012–2013: Team Colpack
- 2013: Bardiani Valvole–CSF Inox (stagiaire)

Professional team
- 2014–2017: Bardiani–CSF

Major wins
- One-day races and Classics Gran Premio Bruno Beghelli (2016)

Nicola Ruffoni (born 14 December 1990) is an Italian racing cyclist.

== Career ==
He competed in the 2014 Giro d'Italia, but failed to finish within the time limit on stage 11. He rode in the 2015 Giro d'Italia, but withdrew on stage 15.

In May 2017, one day before the start of the 2017 Giro d'Italia, the UCI announced that Ruffoni and Bardiani–CSF team-mate Stefano Pirazzi had tested positive for growth hormone-releasing peptides in out-of-competition controls carried out the previous month. Later that month the UCI confirmed that both riders' B-samples had also tested positive, leading Bardiani-CSF to confirm that they would terminate both riders' contracts. On 14 December 2017, the Union Cycliste Internationale (UCI) banned Ruffoni for four years, and as a result, he was unable to compete until May 2021.

== Major results ==
2009
5th Trofeo Città di Brescia
2010
6th Circuito del Porto
2012
2nd Circuito del Porto
2nd Trofeo Città di Brescia
5th Road race, UEC European Under-23 Road Championships
5th Trofeo Papà Cervi
2013
1st Road race, Mediterranean Games
Giro del Friuli-Venezia Giulia

1st Stages 1 & 2

4th Circuito del Porto
8th Trofeo Alcide Degasperi
2014
1st Stage 3 Tour du Poitou-Charentes
8th Gran Premio Bruno Beghelli
2015
7th Grand Prix de Denain
2016
1st Gran Premio Bruno Beghelli
Tour of Austria

1st Stages 1 & 6

2nd Coppa Bernocchi
2017
Tour of Croatia

1st Points classification
1st Stages 3 & 4

=== Grand Tour general classification results timeline ===
Grand Tour	2014	2015	2016	2017
Giro d'Italia	DNF	DNF	DNF	DNS
Tour de France	—	—	—	—
Vuelta a España	—	—	—	—

Legend
—	Did not compete
DNF	Did not finish
