= Marcin Mrożek =

Polish cyclist

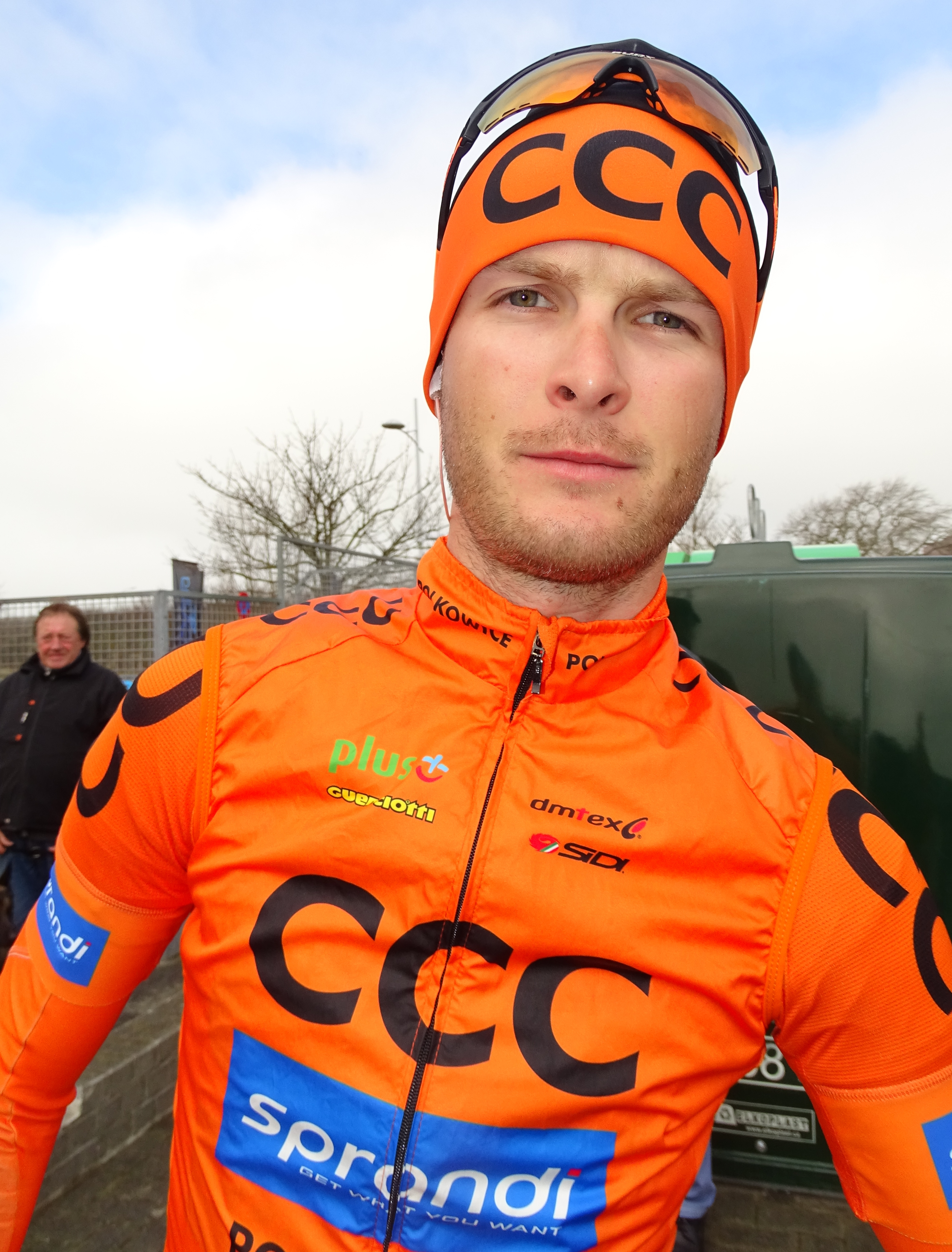
- Mrożek in 2016.

Personal information
- Full name: Marcin Mrożek
- Born: 26 February 1990 (age 36) Targanice, Poland
- Height: 1.76 m (5 ft 9 in)
- Weight: 66 kg (146 lb)

Cycling career
- Sport: Cycling
- Current team: Retired
- Discipline: Road
- Role: Rider

Amateur teams
- 2009: TC Chrobry Felt Głogów
- 2011–2012: Fracor Aba Arredamenti Grupposei
- 2013–2015: Vejus–TMF

Professional teams
- 2014: Androni Giocattoli–Venezuela (stagiaire)
- 2016–2017: CCC–Sprandi–Polkowice

Marcin Mrożek (born 26 February 1990) is a Polish former cyclist, who rode professionally for UCI Professional Continental team CCC–Sprandi–Polkowice, in 2016 and 2017.

== Major results ==
2013
6th Trofeo Internazionale Bastianelli
2014
10th Trofeo Internazionale Bastianelli
2015
9th Giro del Medio Brenta
2016
10th Korona Kocich Gór
