= Hermann Pernsteiner =

Austrian cyclist

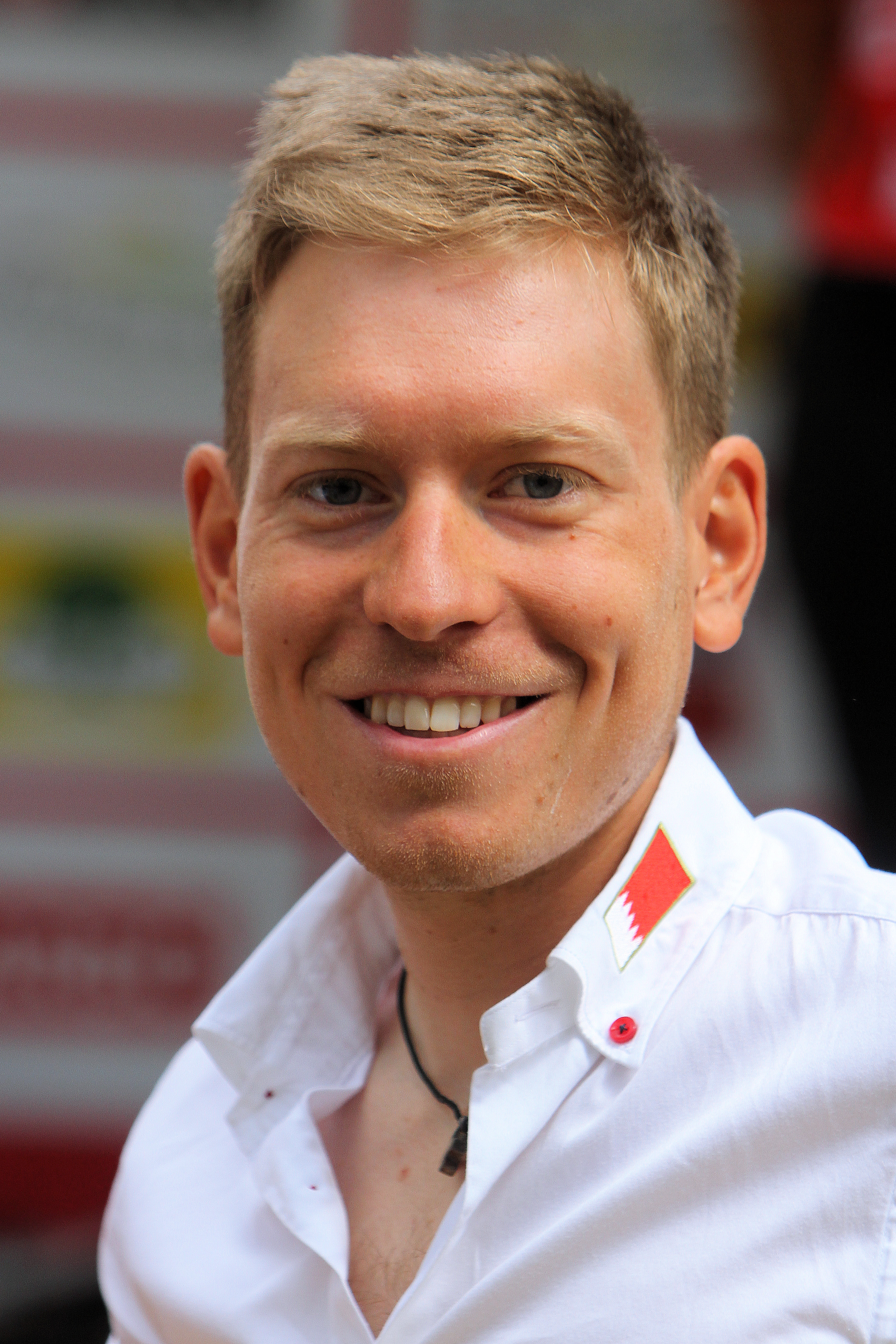
- Pernsteiner in 2019.

Personal information
- Full name: Hermann Pernsteiner
- Born: 7 August 1990 (age 36) Oberwart, Burgenland, Austria
- Height: 1.68 m (5 ft 6 in)
- Weight: 65 kg (143 lb)

Cycling career
- Sport: Cycling
- Current team: Team Felt–Felbermayr
- Disciplines: Road; Mountain biking
- Role: Rider
- Rider type: Climber

Professional teams
- 2016–2017: Amplatz–BMC
- 2018–2023: Bahrain–Merida
- 2024–: Team Felt–Felbermayr

Hermann Pernsteiner (born 7 August 1990) is an Austrian professional road racing cyclist, who currently rides for the UCI Continental team Team Felt–Felbermayr. In August 2018, he was named in the startlist for the 2018 Vuelta a España. In October 2020, he was named in the startlist for the 2020 Giro d'Italia. He finished 30th in the road race at the 2020 Summer Olympics.

== Major results ==
2016
6th Overall Tour of Austria

1st Austrian rider classification

2017
1st Overall Tour d'Azerbaïdjan
6th Overall Tour of Slovenia
10th Overall Istrian Spring Trophy
2018
1st Gran Premio di Lugano
2nd Overall Tour of Austria
2nd Overall Tour of Japan
2020
10th Overall Giro d'Italia
10th Overall Tour Down Under
2022
4th Japan Cup

=== Grand Tour general classification results timeline ===
Grand Tour	2018	2019	2020
Giro d'Italia	—	—	10
Tour de France	—	—	—
Vuelta a España	DNF	15	—

Legend
—	Did not compete
DNF	Did not finish
