= Sjoerd van Ginneken =

Dutch cyclist (born 1992)

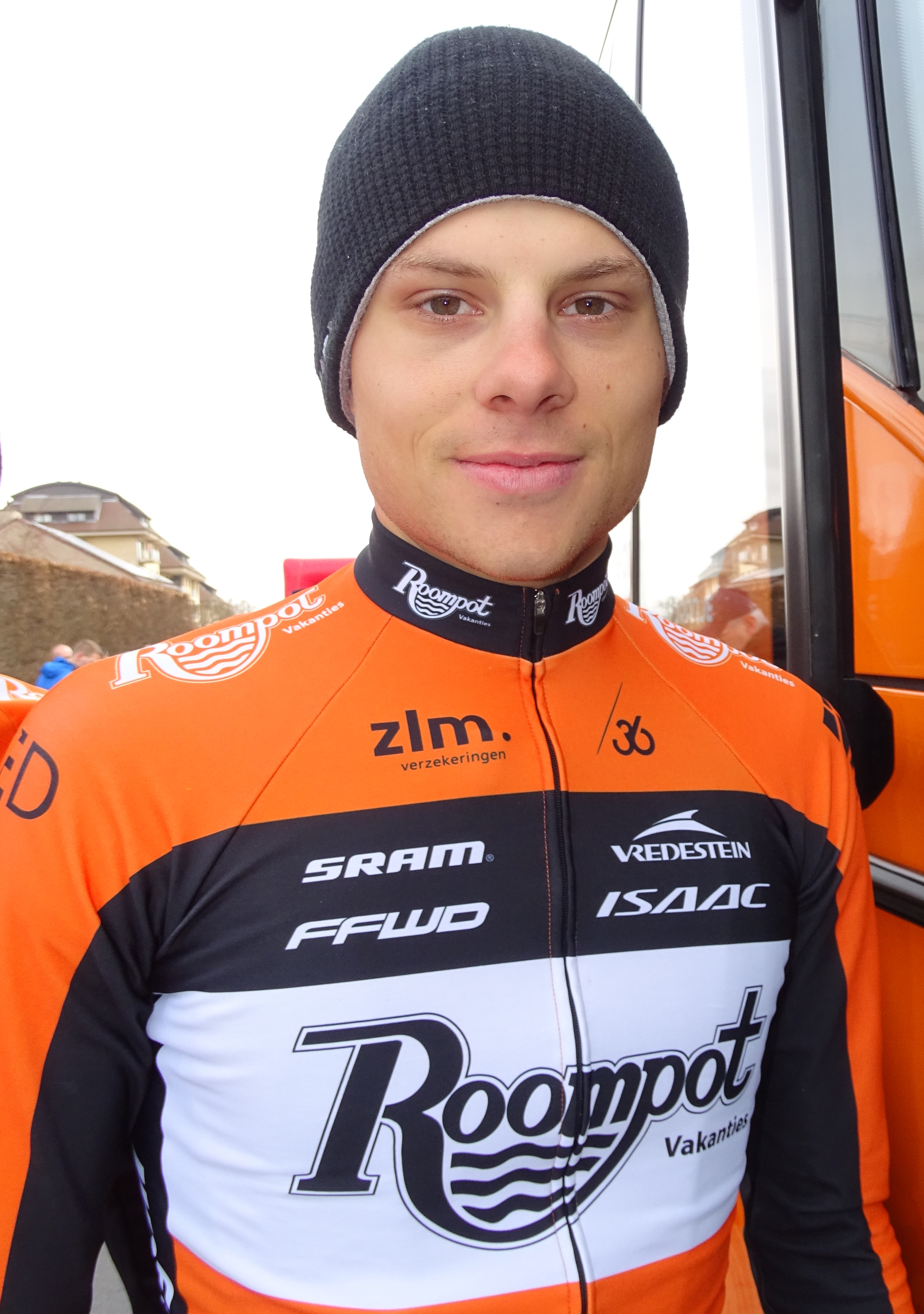
- Van Ginneken at the 2015 E3 Harelbeke

Personal information
- Full name: Sjoerd van Ginneken
- Born: 6 November 1992 (age 33) Heerle, Netherlands

Cycling career
- Sport: Cycling
- Current team: Retired
- Discipline: Road
- Role: Rider

Amateur team
- 2012–2013: Parkhotel Rooding Valkenburg

Professional teams
- 2014: Metec–TKH
- 2015–2019: Team Roompot

Sjoerd van Ginneken (born 6 November 1992) is a Dutch former professional racing cyclist, who competed professionally between 2014 and 2019 for the Metec–TKH and Roompot–Charles teams.

== Major results ==
2014
3rd Baronie Breda Classic
4th Overall Czech Cycling Tour

1st Young rider classification
1st Stage 1 (TTT)

8th Overall Okolo Slovenska

1st Young rider classification

2018
6th Antwerp Port Epic
7th Druivenkoers Overijse
2019
7th Grote Prijs Jef Scherens
9th Clásica de Almería
9th Ronde van Overijssel
