= 2016 Settimana Internazionale di Coppi e Bartali =

2016 UCI Europe Tour

Race details
- Dates: 24–27 March 2015
- Stages: 5
- Distance: 599.5 km (372.5 mi)
- Winning time: 14h 14' 58"

Results
Jersey awarded to the overall winner	Winner	Sergey Firsanov (RUS)	(Gazprom–RusVelo)
	Second	Mauro Finetto (ITA)	(Unieuro–Wilier)
	Third	Gianni Moscon (ITA)	(Team Sky)
Jersey awarded to the points classification winner	Points	Mauro Finetto (ITA)	(Unieuro–Wilier)
Jersey awarded to the mountains classification winner	Mountains	Sergey Firsanov (RUS)	(Gazprom–RusVelo)
Jersey awarded to the youth classification winner	Youth	Egan Bernal (COL)	(Androni Giocattoli–Sidermec)
	Team	Team Sky	

The 2016 Settimana Internazionale di Coppi e Bartali is the 31st edition of the Settimana Internazionale di Coppi e Bartali cycling stage race. It started on 24 March in Gatteo and will end on 27 March in Pavullo.

== Schedule ==
Like the previous two editions, the 2016 race has four days of racing. The first of this is a split stage, with a road stage followed by a team time trial the same day. The following three days each had one stage.

Stage	Date	Course	Distance	Type	Winner
1a	24 March	Gatteo to Gatteo	95.9 km (59.6 mi)	Hilly stage	Manuel Belletti (ITA)
1b	24 March	Gatteo Mare to Gatteo	13.3 km (8.3 mi)	Team time trial	Gazprom–RusVelo
2	25 March	Riccione to Sogliano al Rubicone	154.7 km (96.1 mi)	Intermediate stage	Sergey Firsanov (RUS)
3	26 March	Calderara di Reno to Crevalcore	172 km (106.9 mi)	Flat stage	Jakub Mareczko (ITA)
4	27 March	Pavullo to Pavullo	163.6 km (101.7 mi)	Intermediate stage	Stefano Pirazzi (ITA)
Total		599.5 km (372.5 mi)			

== Teams ==
A total of 25 teams took part to the race

=== UCI WorldTeams ===
- Team Dimension Data
- Team Sky

=== UCI Professional Continental Teams ===
- Southeast–Venezuela
- Androni Giocattoli–Sidermec
- Bardiani–CSF
- Gazprom–RusVelo
- Nippo–Vini Fantini
- Topsport Vlaanderen–Baloise

=== UCI Continental teams ===
- Synergy Baku
- WIGGINS
- D'Amico–Bottecchia
- GM Europa Ovini
- Norda–MG.K Vis Vega
- Unieuro–Wilier
- Cycling Academy
- Meridiana–Kamen
- Christina Jewelry Pro Cycling
- Tirol Cycling Team
- Skydive Dubai–Al Ahli
- Amore & Vita–Selle SMP
- Adria Mobil
- Kolss BDC Team
- Team TreFor
- Rally Cycling

=== National Teams ===
- Italy

== Classifications leadership table ==
Stage	Winner	General classification	Points classification	Mountains classification	Young rider classification	Teams classification
1a	Manuel Belletti	Manuel Belletti	Manuel Belletti	Vitaliy Buts	Davide Plebani	Southeast Pro Cycling
1b	Gazprom–RusVelo	Artur Ershov	Manuel Belletti	Vitaliy Buts	Davide Plebani	Gazprom–RusVelo
2	Sergey Firsanov	Sergey Firsanov	Sergey Firsanov	Kirill Pozdnyakov	Domen Novak	Team Sky
3	Jakub Mareczko	Sergey Firsanov	Mattia Gavazzi	Kirill Pozdnyakov	Domen Novak	Team Sky
4	Stefano Pirazzi	Sergey Firsanov	Mauro Finetto	Sergey Firsanov	Egan Bernal	Team Sky
Final		Sergey Firsanov	Mauro Finetto	Sergey Firsanov	Egan Bernal	Team Sky
