= Frederik Backaert =

Belgian cyclist

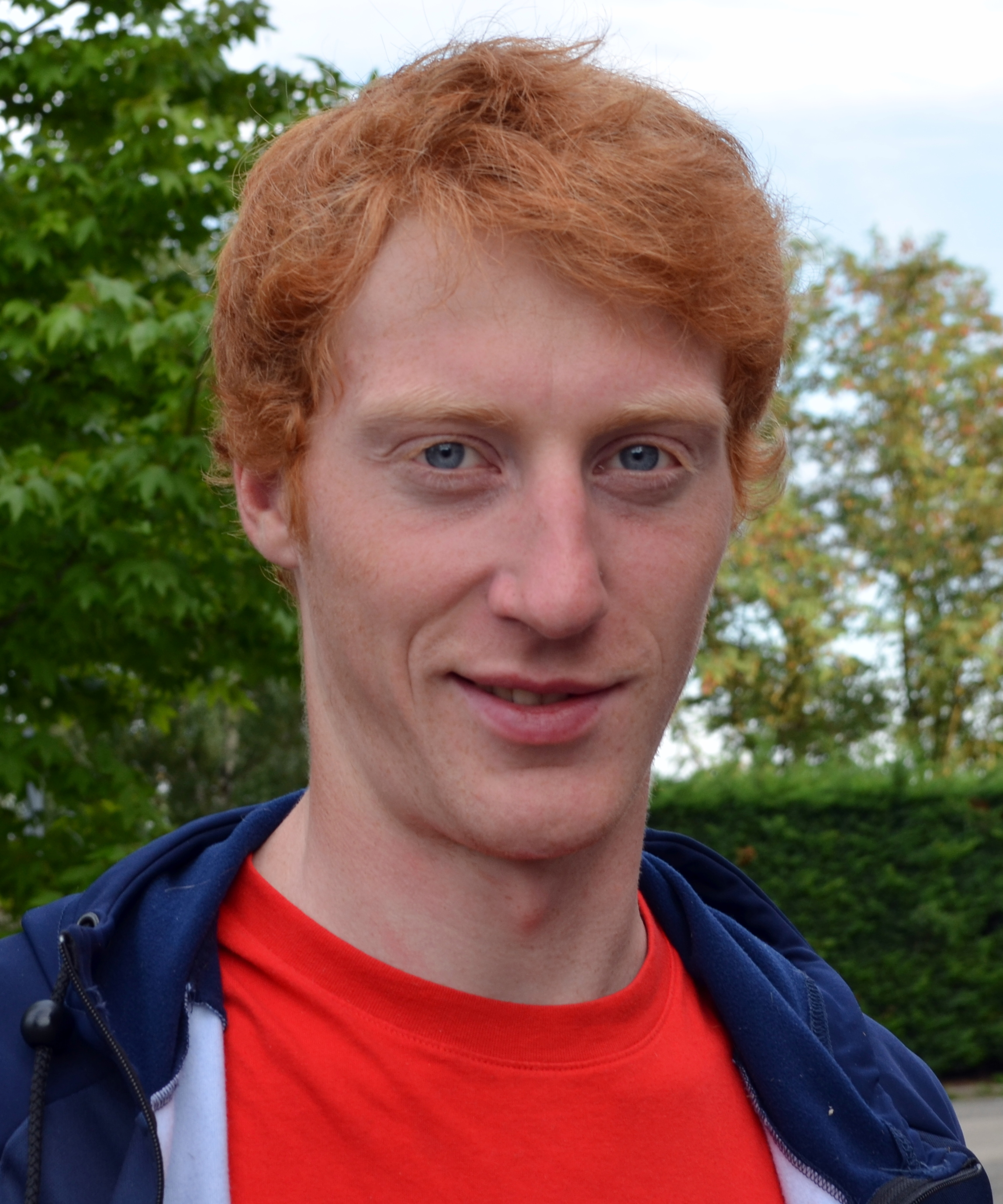
- Backaert at the 2014 Tour de l'Ain

Personal information
- Full name: Frederik Backaert
- Born: 13 March 1990 (age 36) Ghent, Belgium
- Height: 1.88 m (6 ft 2 in)
- Weight: 75 kg (165 lb; 11.8 st)

Cycling career
- Sport: Cycling
- Current team: Retired
- Discipline: Road
- Role: Rider

Amateur teams
- 2012: United
- 2012: Landbouwkrediet–Euphony (stagiaire)
- 2013: EFC–Omega Pharma–Quick-Step

Professional teams
- 2014–2019: Wanty–Groupe Gobert
- 2020–2021: B&B Hotels–Vital Concept

Frederik Backaert (born 13 March 1990 in Ghent) is a Belgian former professional cyclist, who rode professionally between 2014 and 2021, for the Wanty–Gobert and B&B Hotels p/b KTM teams. In June 2017, he was named in the startlist for the Tour de France.

== Major results ==
2012
1st Grand Prix de Momignies
1st Stage 5 Tour de Liège
2013
1st Overall Trois Jours de Cherbourg

1st Stage 1

2nd Overall Tour de Liège

1st Stages 2 & 5

9th Circuit de Wallonie
10th Grand Prix des Marbriers
2014
2nd GP Paul Borremans Viane-Geraardsbergen
4th Internationale Wielertrofee Jong Maar Moedig
2015
4th Overall Four Days of Dunkirk
6th Omloop van het Waasland
7th Tour du Finistère
10th Overall Tour of Belgium
10th Internationale Wielertrofee Jong Maar Moedig
2016
Tour of Austria

1st Points classification
1st Stage 7

2017
2nd Tro-Bro Léon
5th Le Samyn
5th Tour du Finistère
7th Overall Giro di Toscana
8th Bruges Cycling Classic
2018
9th Overall Tour de Wallonie
9th Le Samyn
2019
4th Tour du Finistère
10th Overall Four Days of Dunkirk
10th Tro-Bro Léon

=== Grand Tour general classification results timeline ===
Grand Tour	2017	2018	2019
Giro d'Italia	—	—	—
Tour de France	132	—	120
Vuelta a España	—	—	—

Legend
—	Did not compete
DNF	Did not finish
