= Brendan Canty (cyclist) =

Australian bicycle racer

Personal information
- Full name: Brendan Canty
- Born: 17 January 1992 (age 34) Frankston, Victoria, Australia
- Height: 1.70 m (5 ft 7 in)
- Weight: 60 kg (132 lb)

Cycling career
- Sport: Cycling
- Current team: Retired
- Discipline: Road
- Role: Rider
- Rider type: Climber

Amateur teams
- 2014: Drapac Professional Cycling (stagiaire)
- 2015: Drapac Professional Cycling (stagiaire)

Professional teams
- 2015: Team Budget Forklifts
- 2016: Drapac Professional Cycling
- 2017–2018: Cannondale–Drapac

Brendan Canty (born 17 January 1992) is an Australian former professional road racing cyclist, who rode professionally between 2015 and 2018 for Team Budget Forklifts, Drapac Professional Cycling and EF Education First–Drapac p/b Cannondale. Following his retirement, Canty became a financial analyst for international education company EF Education First.

== Major results ==
2015
1st Stage 3a (ITT) Tour de Beauce
7th Overall Herald Sun Tour
2016
2nd Road race, Oceania Road Championships
7th Overall Tour of Oman

1st Young rider classification

8th Overall Tour of Austria

1st Stage 3

2017
National Road Championships

6th Time trial
7th Road race

2018
9th Road race, National Road Championships

=== Grand Tour general classification results timeline ===
Grand Tour	2017
Giro d'Italia	—
Tour de France	—
Vuelta a España	113

Legend
—	Did not compete
DNF	Did not finish
