= Simone Sterbini =

Italian cyclist

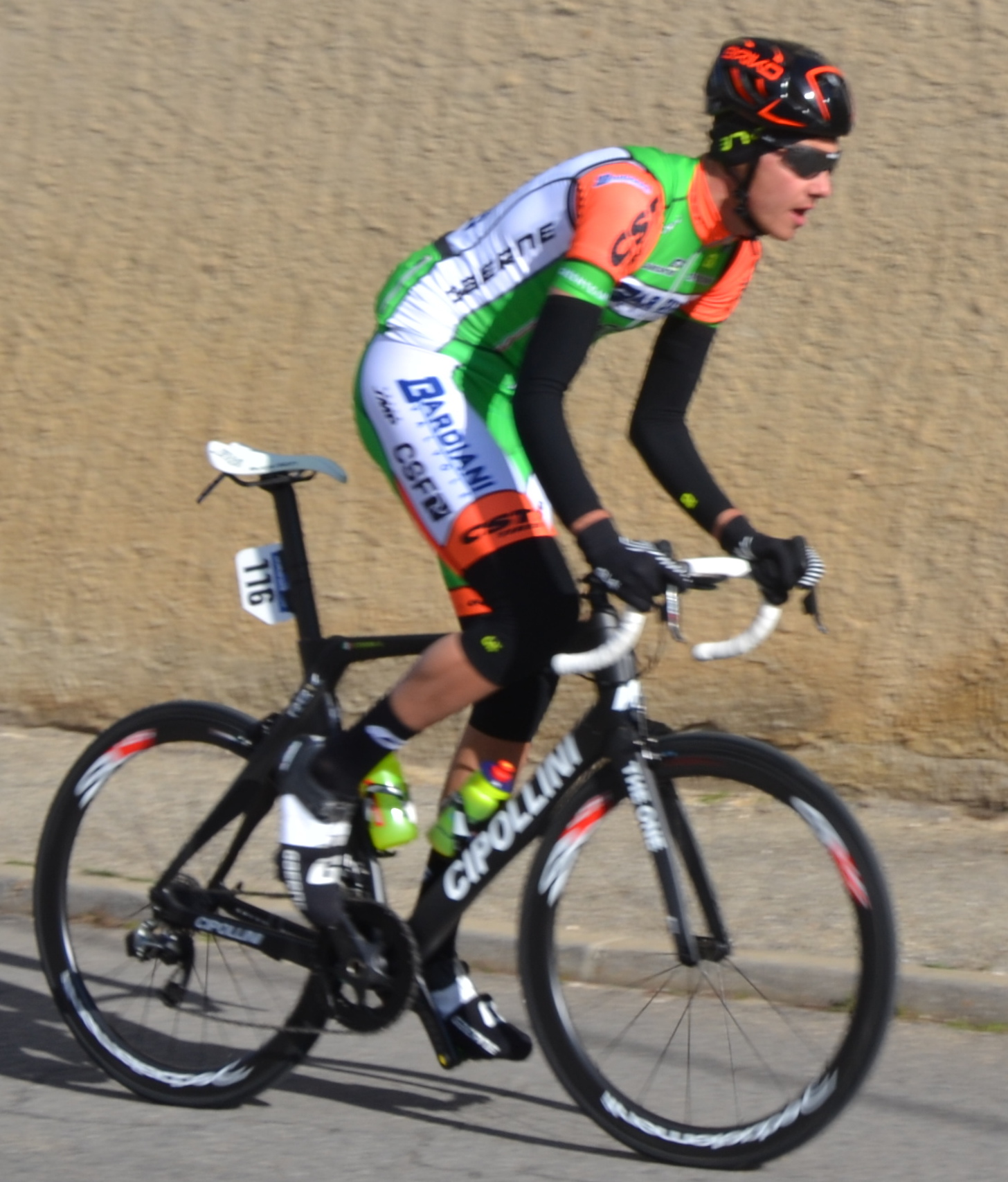
- Sterbini at the 2018 Étoile de Bessèges.

Personal information
- Born: 11 December 1993 (age 32) Palestrina, Lazio, Italy
- Height: 192 cm (6 ft 4 in)
- Weight: 67 kg (148 lb)

Cycling career
- Sport: Cycling
- Current team: Retired
- Discipline: Road
- Role: Rider
- Rider type: Climbing specialist

Amateur teams
- 2012–2014: Palazzago Elledent Rad Logistica
- 2014: Bardiani–CSF (stagiaire)

Professional teams
- 2015–2018: Bardiani–CSF
- 2019: Giotti Victoria–Palomar

Simone Sterbini (born 11 December 1993) is an Italian former professional racing cyclist, who rode professionally between 2015 and 2019 for the Bardiani–CSF and Giotti Victoria–Palomar teams.

== Major results ==
2013
10th Gran Premio Palio del Recioto
2014
1st Road race, National Under-23 Road Championships
10th Gran Premio Palio del Recioto
2016
1st Stage 5 Tour of Austria
