= Dobratsch =

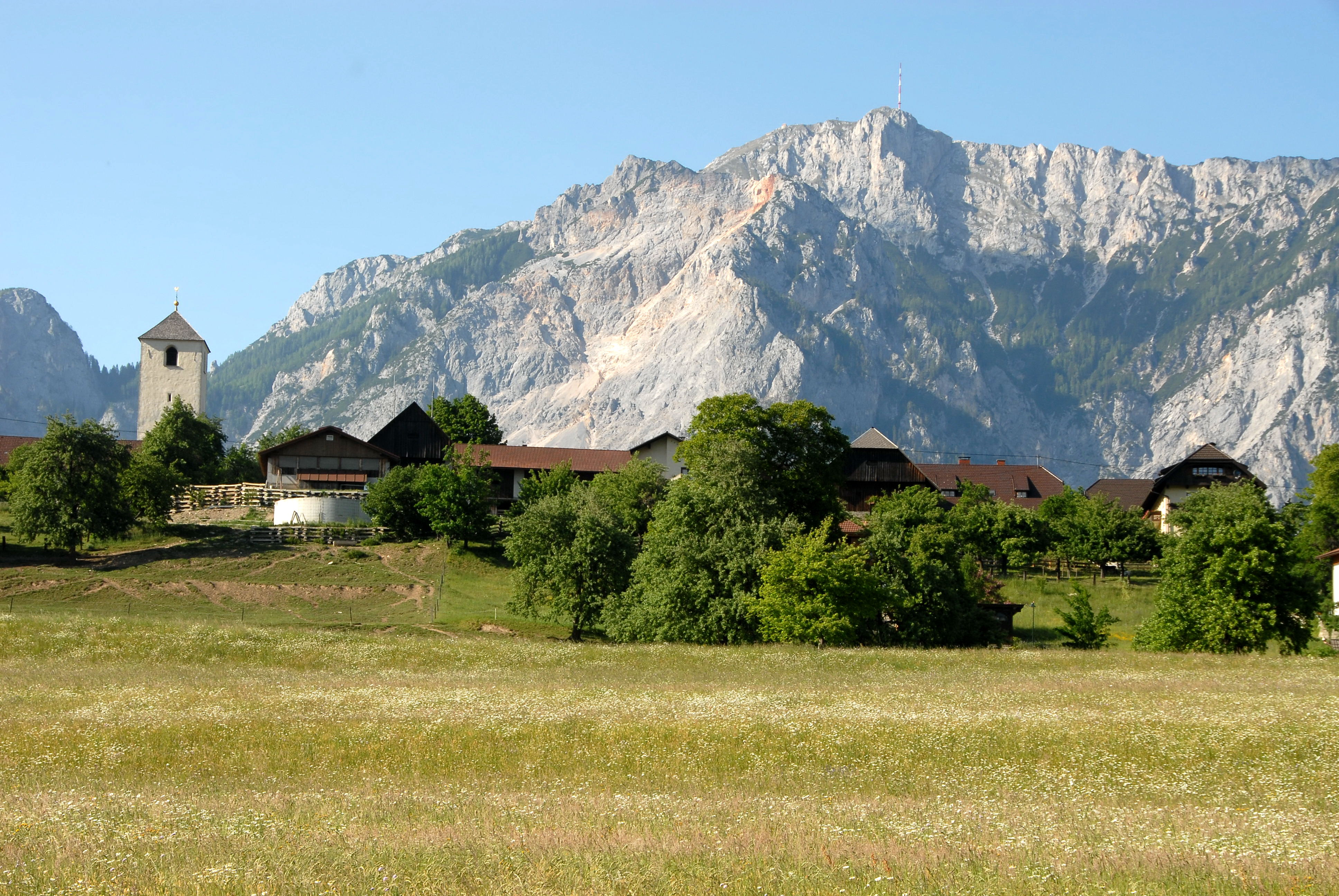
South side of Dobratsch as seen from Hohenthurn.

Dobratsch (German pronunciation: [ˈdoːbʁat͡ʃ]; Slovenian: Dobrač) or the Villacher Alps (German: Villacher Alpen, Slovenian: Beljaščica) is a mountain range in the Carinthia region of Austria. Its peak is 2,166 meters (7,106 ft) above sea level and it is a protected natural park. It forms the foothills of the Gailtal Alps and is immediately west of the town of Villach.

== Climate ==
Dobratsch has a subarctic climate (Köppen Dfc) bordering on tundra climate (Köppen ET).

Climate data for Villacher Alpe/Dobratsch: 2117m (1991−2020 normals)
Month	Jan	Feb	Mar	Apr	May	Jun	Jul	Aug	Sep	Oct	Nov	Dec	Year
Record high °C (°F)	9.4 (48.9)	9.0 (48.2)	9.8 (49.6)	13.5 (56.3)	18.3 (64.9)	22.5 (72.5)	22.0 (71.6)	23.6 (74.5)	18.0 (64.4)	17.1 (62.8)	12.5 (54.5)	9.2 (48.6)	23.6 (74.5)
Mean daily maximum °C (°F)	−3.1 (26.4)	−3.7 (25.3)	−1.2 (29.8)	1.9 (35.4)	6.3 (43.3)	10.8 (51.4)	12.4 (54.3)	12.4 (54.3)	8.2 (46.8)	4.8 (40.6)	0.7 (33.3)	−2.3 (27.9)	3.9 (39.1)
Daily mean °C (°F)	−5.6 (21.9)	−6.0 (21.2)	−3.7 (25.3)	−0.5 (31.1)	4.0 (39.2)	8.1 (46.6)	10.0 (50.0)	10.2 (50.4)	5.9 (42.6)	2.7 (36.9)	−1.5 (29.3)	−4.8 (23.4)	1.6 (34.8)
Mean daily minimum °C (°F)	−7.8 (18.0)	−9.1 (15.6)	−6.0 (21.2)	−2.9 (26.8)	1.4 (34.5)	5.3 (41.5)	6.9 (44.4)	7.3 (45.1)	3.6 (38.5)	0.5 (32.9)	−3.6 (25.5)	−6.8 (19.8)	−0.9 (30.3)
Record low °C (°F)	−23.0 (−9.4)	−27.5 (−17.5)	−22.8 (−9.0)	−17.2 (1.0)	−8.8 (16.2)	−6.0 (21.2)	−1.5 (29.3)	−3.0 (26.6)	−6.1 (21.0)	−15.0 (5.0)	−19.5 (−3.1)	−24.5 (−12.1)	−27.5 (−17.5)
Average precipitation mm (inches)	69.0 (2.72)	63.2 (2.49)	74.7 (2.94)	92.0 (3.62)	109 (4.3)	131.3 (5.17)	150.1 (5.91)	168.7 (6.64)	128.9 (5.07)	123.5 (4.86)	138.6 (5.46)	97.4 (3.83)	1,346.4 (53.01)
Average snowfall cm (inches)	43.7 (17.2)	59.3 (23.3)	60.5 (23.8)	55.5 (21.9)	26.6 (10.5)	3.3 (1.3)	1.0 (0.4)	0.9 (0.4)	12.6 (5.0)	26.7 (10.5)	65.0 (25.6)	62.8 (24.7)	417.9 (164.6)
Average precipitation days (≥ 1.0 mm)	7.5	7.1	8.9	11.0	12.4	12.4	12.6	12.5	9.8	9.5	10.6	9.2	123.5
Average snowy days (≥ 1 cm)	30.6	28.3	31.0	29.4	15.9	2.0	0.2	0.2	3.1	9.4	20.6	28.9	199.6
Source: Central Institute for Meteorology and Geodynamics
