= Stefano Pirazzi =

Italian cyclist

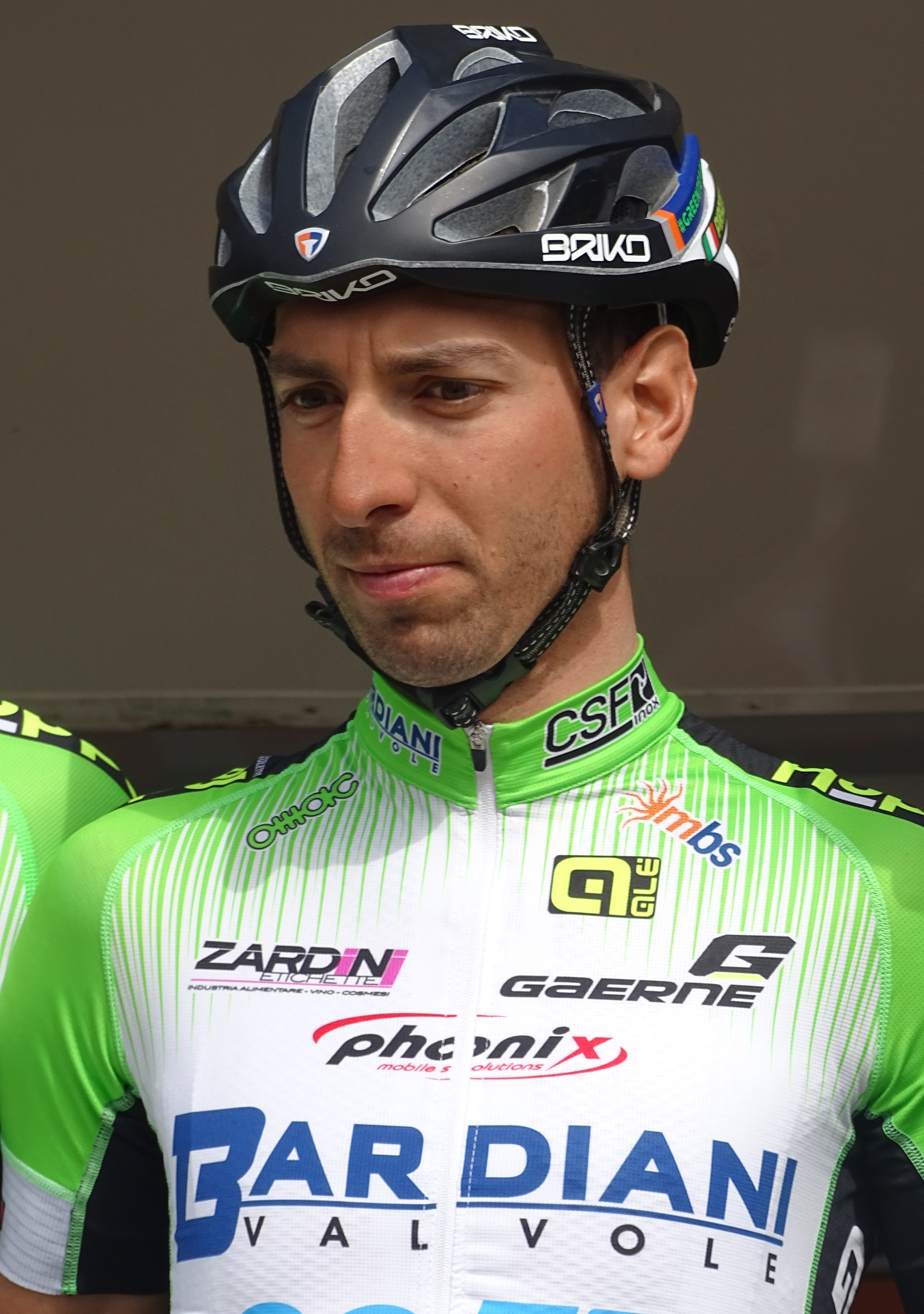

Personal information
- Full name: Stefano Pirazzi
- Born: 11 March 1987 (age 39) Alatri, Italy
- Height: 1.80 m (5 ft 11 in)
- Weight: 62 kg (137 lb)

Cycling career
- Sport: Cycling
- Current team: Amore & Vita
- Discipline: Road
- Role: Rider
- Rider type: Climber

Amateur team
- 2007–2009: Palazzago Saclà Maiet

Professional teams
- 2010–2017: Colnago–CSF Inox
- 2021–: Amore & Vita

Major wins
- Grand Tours Giro d'Italia Mountains classification (2013) 1 individual stage (2014)

Stefano Pirazzi (born 11 March 1987) is an Italian professional road bicycle racer, who currently rides for UCI Continental team Amore & Vita.

== Career ==
Born in Alatri, Pirazzi has competed as a professional since 2010, joining Colnago–CSF Inox from the amateur ranks; his twin brother Roberto is also a cyclist, and was also a member of the Palazzago Rad Logistica team with Stefano in 2009.

In May 2017, one day before the start of the 2017 Giro d'Italia, the UCI announced that Pirazzi and Bardiani–CSF team-mate Nicola Ruffoni had tested positive for growth hormone-releasing peptides in out-of-competition controls carried out the previous month. Later that month the UCI confirmed that both riders' B-samples had also tested positive, leading Bardiani–CSF to confirm that they would terminate both riders' contracts. In October, Pirazzi was given a four-year ban backdated to the date of the original announcement – as a result, he was unable to compete again until May 2021. Following the completion of his ban, he joined the Amore & Vita team, making his first start at the Mercan'Tour Classic Alpes-Maritimes.

== Major results ==
2007
1st Stage 3 Giro delle Regioni
4th Giro del Canavese
6th Gara Ciclistica Milionaria
8th Overall Volta a Lleida

1st Mountains classification
1st Stages 4 & 5b

2008
3rd Road race, National Under-23 Road Championships
7th Cronoscalata Gardone Valtrompia
2009
1st Gara Milionaria Montappone
3rd Trofeo Internazionale Bastianelli
6th Giro del Cigno
2011
1st Mountains classification, Giro della Provincia di Reggio Calabria
1st Young rider classification, Giro del Trentino
3rd Overall Settimana Internazionale di Coppi e Bartali
2012
1st Mountains classification, Tirreno–Adriatico
2013
1st Mountains classification, Giro d'Italia
2nd Time trial, National Road Championships
7th Overall Giro del Trentino
2014 (1 pro win)
1st Stage 17 Giro d'Italia
4th Time trial, National Road Championships
2015
2nd Giro dell'Appennino
2016 (1)
4th Overall Settimana Internazionale di Coppi e Bartali

1st Stage 4

=== Grand Tour general classification results timeline ===
Grand Tour	2010	2011	2012	2013	2014	2015	2016
Giro d'Italia	120	61	46	44	85	22	18
Tour de France	Did not contest during his career						
Vuelta a España	Did not contest during his career						

Legend
—	Did not compete
DNF	Did not finish
