= List of cycling magazines =

A cycling magazine or bicycle magazine is a magazine with news and reports on bicycles, cycling, and the bicycle industry.

Bicycle magazines may feature new bicycle tests and comparisons, which describe advantages and disadvantages of similar models; future models speculations; bicycle tour descriptions; bicycle safety issues, lists of new models and gear with prices, manufacturer advertisements, specifications and ratings; new and used bicycle advertisements; bicycle racing news and events; and other information.

Among the first publications for cyclists appears to be Cycling UK’s (then the "Bicycle Touring Club") club journal which was first published in October 1878. Other early cycling-oriented magazines were Cyclist and Wheeling (1880 or earlier) and the London-based Bicycling News (1881 or earlier). In the 1880s more than a dozen magazines already existed in the UK. A particularly long-running publication is Cycling Weekly which was started in 1891 as Cycling. Cycling was the largest cycling magazine in the 1890s.

== Magazines ==
Cycling magazines include:

- Adventure Cyclist, USA
- Bicycle Quarterly (2002–) USA
- Bicycling (1961), USA
- BIKE Magazine (2018–), UK
- Dirt Rag (1989–2020), USA
- Cycle Sport (1993–2016), UK
- Cycling Active (2009–2016), UK
- Cycling Plus (1992–), UK
- Cycling Weekly, UK
- Cycling West, USA, 1993–
- Cycling World, UK
- Cyclist, UK
- L'Industrie Vélocipédique (1882–1913), France
- Mountain Bike Rider, UK
- Mountain Biking UK, UK
- Procycling, UK
- Rouleur (2006–), UK
- Singletrack, UK
- Sporting Cyclist, UK
- Vélo Magazine, France
- Velo Vision, UK
- VeloNews, USA
