= Bob Bob Ricard =

Restaurant in London

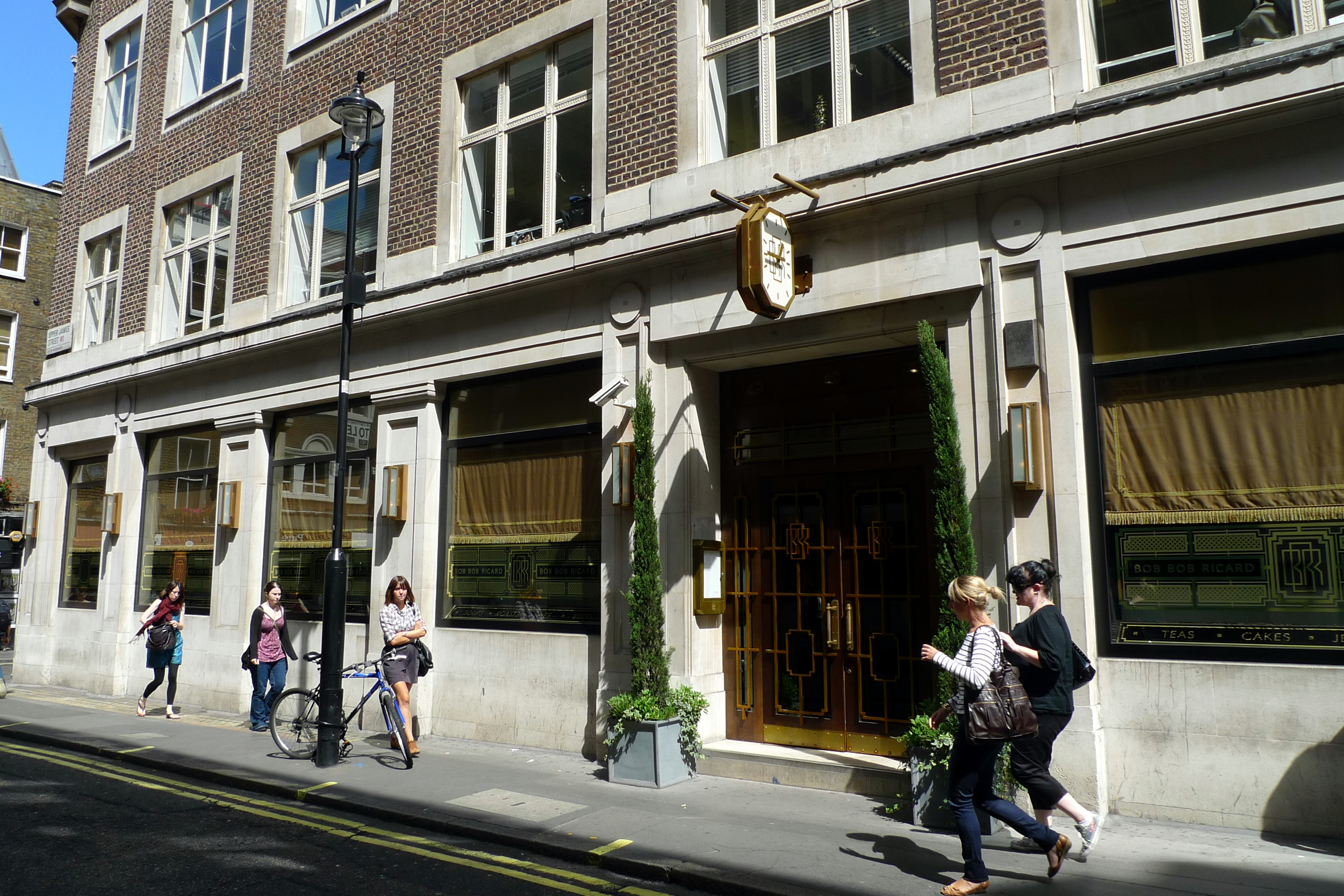

- Location within Central London

Restaurant information
- Established: 2008
- Location: 1 Upper James Street, London, W1F 9DF, UK
- Coordinates: 51°30′44″N 0°8′14″W
- Website: www.bobbobricard.com

Bob Bob Ricard (or BBR) is a restaurant near Golden Square in London's Soho district.

== History ==
The restaurant opened in late 2008 and is owned by the Russian-born British entrepreneur Leonid Shutov.

== Wine pricing ==
BBR has a stated maximum mark-up not exceeding £50 per bottle, however expensive the wine. While the prices of entry level wines and champagnes may not differ much from those of other top London restaurants, the gap becomes dramatic on anything over £30–40 per bottle. BBR states in the wine list what their UK competition charges for the same wines.

== Design ==
Stephen Bayley, a British design critic and author, writing in The Observer in January 2009 has described BBR's interior as "foreign and weird", "fastidiously executed to the wrong plan" and "a bizarre combination of Norman Rockwell-style American diner with banquettes, plus terrazzo, perhaps from a Cannes fish restaurant, antiqued mirror ceiling, real as well as metaphorical brass" destined for "the trashcan of history". In the same month, BBR was pronounced winner of Wallpaper magazine's 2009 Global Design Awards, while in September Time Out magazine's Eating & Drinking Awards 2009 picked BBR as winner for Best New Design, citing that "working within a loose theme of Orient Express meets American diner, (David) Collins has brought polish and professionalism to this Soho restaurant, with exquisite finishes, intimate booth seating, marble table tops, theatrical drapes, wooden panelling, brass rails and an inlaid floor". In 2009, BBR was the winner of the Identity category at the Restaurant & Bar Design Awards.

== Reception ==
One of UK's pre-eminent restaurant critics, The Sunday Times's AA Gill (who described it as "Liberace's bathroom dropped into a Texan diner") called the restaurant "the last turkey standing" and awarded it the rarely seen "No stars" out of five. At the same time, MasterChef's Gregg Wallace gave the restaurant "10 out of 10 for food" in his review for BBC's Olive magazine, while the pundit for Metro Marina O'Loughlin declared "I'm prepared to dent any possible credentials by saying I love the deliciously daft Bob Bob Ricard". Matthew Norman's review of the restaurant in The Guardian in April 2009 was followed by the same publication in May 2009 declaring BBR Number 22 of The World's 50 Coolest Places to Eat.
