= 2015 Giro d'Italia =

2015 UCI World Tour, race 15 of 28
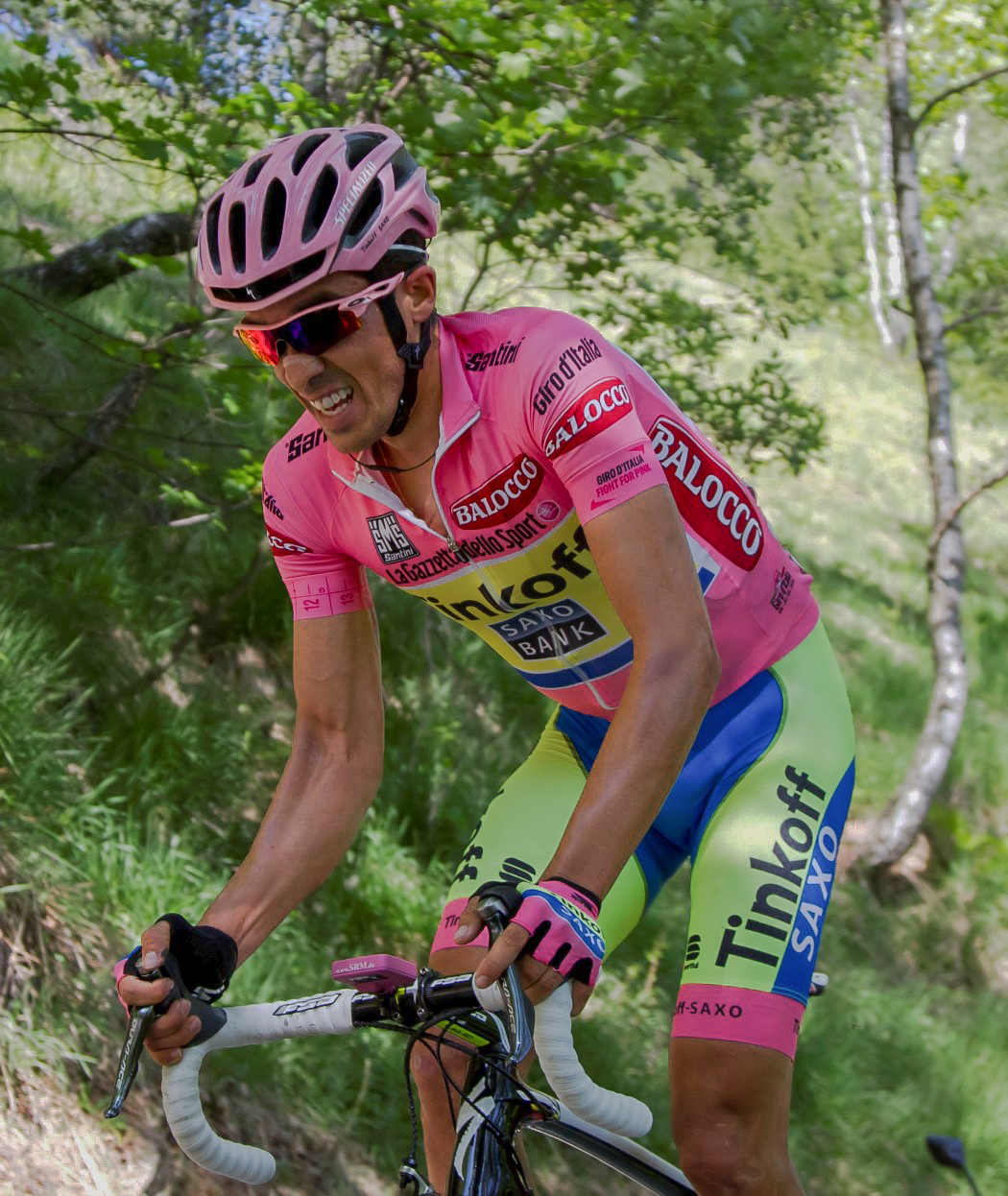
- Alberto Contador, winner of the 2015 Giro, wearing the pink jersey

Race details
- Dates: 9 May – 31 May 2015
- Stages: 21
- Distance: 3,481.8 km (2,163.5 mi)
- Winning time: 88h 22' 25"

Results
Jersey awarded to the overall winner	Winner	Alberto Contador (ESP)	(Tinkoff–Saxo)
	Second	Fabio Aru (ITA)	(Astana)
	Third	Mikel Landa (ESP)	(Astana)
Jersey awarded to the points classification winner	Points	Giacomo Nizzolo (ITA)	(Trek Factory Racing)
Jersey awarded to the mountains classification winner	Mountains	Giovanni Visconti (ITA)	(Movistar Team)
Jersey awarded to the young rider classification winner	Young rider	Fabio Aru (ITA)	(Astana)
	Sprints	Marco Bandiera (ITA)	(Androni Giocattoli–Sidermec)
Jersey awarded to the combativity classification winner	Combativity	Philippe Gilbert (BEL)	(BMC Racing Team)
	Team	Astana	
	Team points	Astana	

The 2015 Giro d'Italia (English: Tour of Italy) was a three-week Grand Tour cycling stage race that took place in May 2015. It was the 98th running of the Giro d'Italia and took place principally in Italy, although some stages visited France and Switzerland. The 3,481.8-kilometre (2,163.5 mi) race included 21 stages, beginning in San Lorenzo al Mare on 9 May and concluding in Milan on 31 May. It was the fifteenth race of the 2015 UCI World Tour. The Giro was won by Alberto Contador (Tinkoff–Saxo), with Fabio Aru (Astana) second and Aru's teammate Mikel Landa third.

Contador first took the lead after stage 5, the race's first uphill finish. His defence of the pink jersey (given to the leader in the General classification in the Giro d'Italia) was put in doubt when he injured his left shoulder in a crash in the sixth stage. He held his lead through several stages but was caught up in another crash in stage 13, which caused him to lose the lead. He took the lead back the following day in the 59.4-kilometre (36.9 mi) Individual time trial, where he gained a lead of several minutes over all his rivals. Despite aggressive riding from Aru and Landa in the final week, Contador was able to defend his lead to the finish of the race. This was his third Giro d'Italia title, after the 2008 race.

As well as finishing second overall, Aru won the white jersey as the best young rider in the week. Giacomo Nizzolo (Trek Factory Racing) won the points competition and Giovanni Visconti (Movistar) won the mountains classification. Astana finished first in both the team ranking by time and the team ranking by points. Contador, Visconti and Nizzolo all won their classifications without winning any stage victories.

== Teams ==
As the Giro d'Italia was a UCI World Tour event, all seventeen UCI WorldTeams were automatically invited and obliged to send a squad. Five UCI Professional Continental teams were given wildcard places in the race by RCS Sport, the race organisers. Four of these were Italian-based teams: Androni Giocattoli–Sidermec, Bardiani–CSF, Nippo–Vini Fantini and Southeast Pro Cycling. Southeast's entry in the race was earned by their victory in the 2014 Coppa Italia, when they competed as Neri Sottoli; they were invited despite three recent doping cases in the team. The final wildcard place was awarded to CCC–Sprandi–Polkowice, a Polish-based team. CCC-Sprandi-Polkowice's invitation immediately received attention because the team's roster included two prominent riders who has previously served bans for doping: Stefan Schumacher and Davide Rebellin. The day after the announcement, Cycling Weekly reported that the team might omit the riders from its squad for the race.

Several prominent teams applied for wildcard places but were unsuccessful. These were UnitedHealthcare, Colombia, Wanty–Groupe Gobert and Caja Rural–Seguros RGA.

The team presentation took place in San Remo on the evening before the first stage. As each team sent nine riders to the race, the startlist contained 198 riders. George Bennett (LottoNL–Jumbo) was withdrawn from the startlist on the night before the race, however, as a blood test had revealed low cortisol levels. As his team was part of the Movement for Credible Cycling (MPCC), he was not allowed to start the Giro. LottoNL–Jumbo therefore began the race with eight riders and there were 197 riders in the peloton at the beginning of the race. This included riders from 36 different countries, with the largest numbers coming from Italy (59), France (15), Belgium (12) and the Netherlands (12). The average age of riders in the Giro was 28.95; they ranged from the 21-year-old Rick Zabel (BMC Racing Team) to the 41-year-old Alessandro Petacchi (Southeast).

UCI WorldTeams

- AG2R La Mondiale
- Astana
- BMC Racing Team
- Etixx–Quick-Step
- FDJ
- IAM Cycling
- Lampre–Merida
- Lotto–Soudal
- Movistar Team
- Orica–GreenEDGE
- Cannondale–Garmin
- Team Giant–Alpecin
- Team Katusha
- LottoNL–Jumbo
- Team Sky
- Tinkoff–Saxo
- Trek Factory Racing

UCI Professional Continental teams

- Bardiani–CSF
- CCC–Sprandi–Polkowice
- Southeast Pro Cycling
- Nippo–Vini Fantini
- Androni Giocattoli–Sidermec

== Pre-race favourites ==
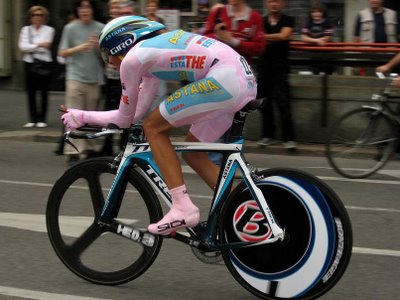
Alberto Contador (Tinkoff–Saxo), photographed in the individual time trial during his victory in the 2008 Giro d'Italia, was the principal favourite for victory in 2015.

The winner of the 2014 Giro d'Italia, Nairo Quintana (Movistar Team), chose not to defend his title in order to focus on the Tour de France. The principal favourite for the race was Alberto Contador (Tinkoff–Saxo), especially as Chris Froome (Team Sky) and Vincenzo Nibali (Astana), two of the most successful active Grand Tour riders, also chose to focus on the Tour and to skip the Giro. Contador, who had won the 2014 Vuelta a España, was attempting to win both the Giro and the Tour in the same season. No rider had achieved this double since Marco Pantani in 1998; Contador described his ambition to do "something that people will remember forever". Contador's last attempt to win both the Giro and the Tour – in the 2011 season – ended in failure. Although he finished first in the Giro, he only managed fifth place in the Tour; both results were subsequently removed because of a ban due to a doping case from 2010.

The rider considered most likely to challenge Contador for the general classification was Richie Porte (Sky). Porte had already achieved nine race victories in 2015, including the overall victories in Paris–Nice, the Volta a Catalunya and the Giro del Trentino. Porte was expected to be particularly strong in the individual time trial, as well as in the mountains. Porte had not shown consistent form in a Grand Tour in recent years, however, and there were doubts about his ability to maintain his form over a three-week race.

Rigoberto Urán (Etixx–Quick-Step) – who had finished second in 2013 and 2014 – was also among the favourites, with the long individual time trial expected to suit him. Fabio Aru (Astana) – who had finished third in 2014 – was also expected to perform well; VeloNews described him as "perhaps the best pure climber in the race". Other riders expected to challenge for the higher places included Ilnur Zakarin (Team Katusha), who had just won the Tour de Romandie, Domenico Pozzovivo (AG2R La Mondiale), Jurgen Van den Broeck (Lotto–Soudal), Damiano Caruso (BMC) and Ryder Hesjedal (Cannondale–Garmin), the winner of the 2012 Giro d'Italia. Four former winners of the Giro started the 2015 edition: Contador, Hesjedal, Ivan Basso (Tinkoff–Saxo) and Damiano Cunego (Nippo–Vini Fantini).

Other prominent riders to start the race included a large number of prominent sprinters, including André Greipel (Lotto–Soudal) and Michael Matthews (Orica–GreenEDGE). Greipel was expected to perform well in the few flat stages. Matthews had the ability to win hillier stages; his team's strength in the team time trial was expected to put him into the pink jersey as leader of the general classification during the first week; he had also worn the jersey in the first week of the 2014 Giro. Tom Boonen (Etixx–Quick-Step), a former world champion, participated in the Giro for the first time in his career.

== Route and stages ==
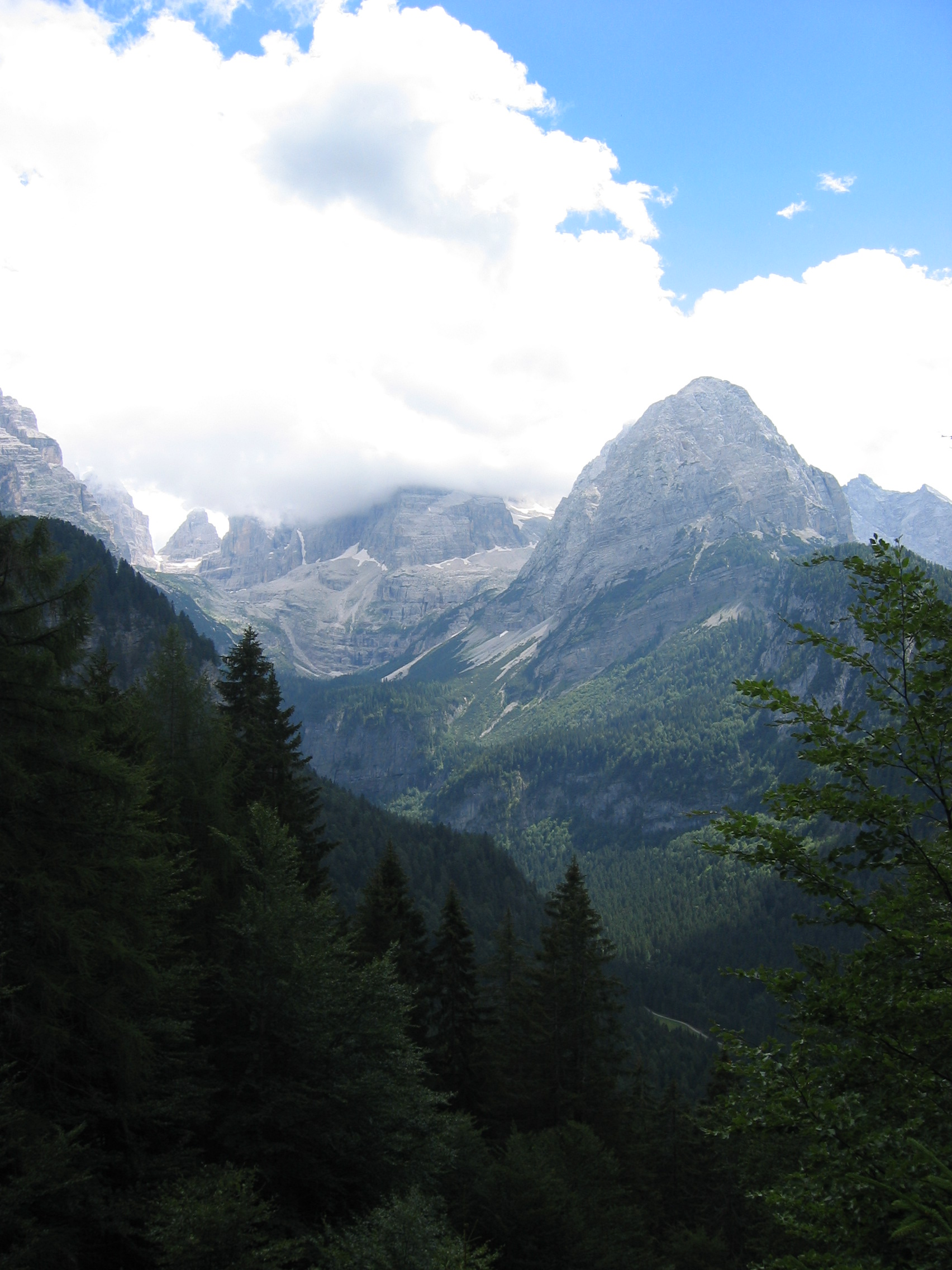
The Dolomites around Madonna di Campiglio, where stage 15 finished

The first announcement of the route for the 2015 Giro came in July 2014, when RCS Sport announced that it would begin with a team time trial from San Lorenzo al Mare along the coast to San Remo. The route would use the Riviera dei Fiori cycle path and would start at the foot of the Cipressa climb made famous by its inclusion in the Milan–San Remo classic. The route used neither the climb of the Cipressa nor that of the Poggio di San Remo; it kept to the coastline and was entirely flat. The stage would end on the Lungomare Italo Calvino in San Remo. The following two stages were announced at the same time. The second stage – the first mass-start stage of the race – would suit the sprinters, while the third stage would take the riders to La Spezia, where the small climb of the Biassa would come towards the end of the stage. A further route announcement was made in mid-September. Mauro Vegni, the race director, announced that the Giro would return to the climb of the Madonna di Campiglio for the first time since 1999. In the 1999 Giro, Marco Pantani won the stage that finished on the climb and was in the race lead; he failed a test for EPO use, however, and was expelled from the race. The full route announcement was made in Milan on 6 October at an event attended by many riders expected to participate in the Giro.

An additional stage in Liguria was included in the route. This was the new third stage, with the stage to La Spezia now stage 4. The additional stage was hilly but had a long flat section towards the finish. The first summit finish of the race came on the second-category climb of the Abetone at the end of stage 5. There was then one flat stage, which was followed by the hilly stage 7, which was the longest stage in any Giro d'Italia since 2000 at 263 kilometres (163 mi). These took the riders south along the Tyrrhenian coast and into Campania and then inland towards the southern Apennines. The race then entered the mountains for stages 8 and 9. Stage 8 had a summit finish on the Campitello Matese; stage 9 included mountains and hills throughout. This was followed by the race's first rest day.

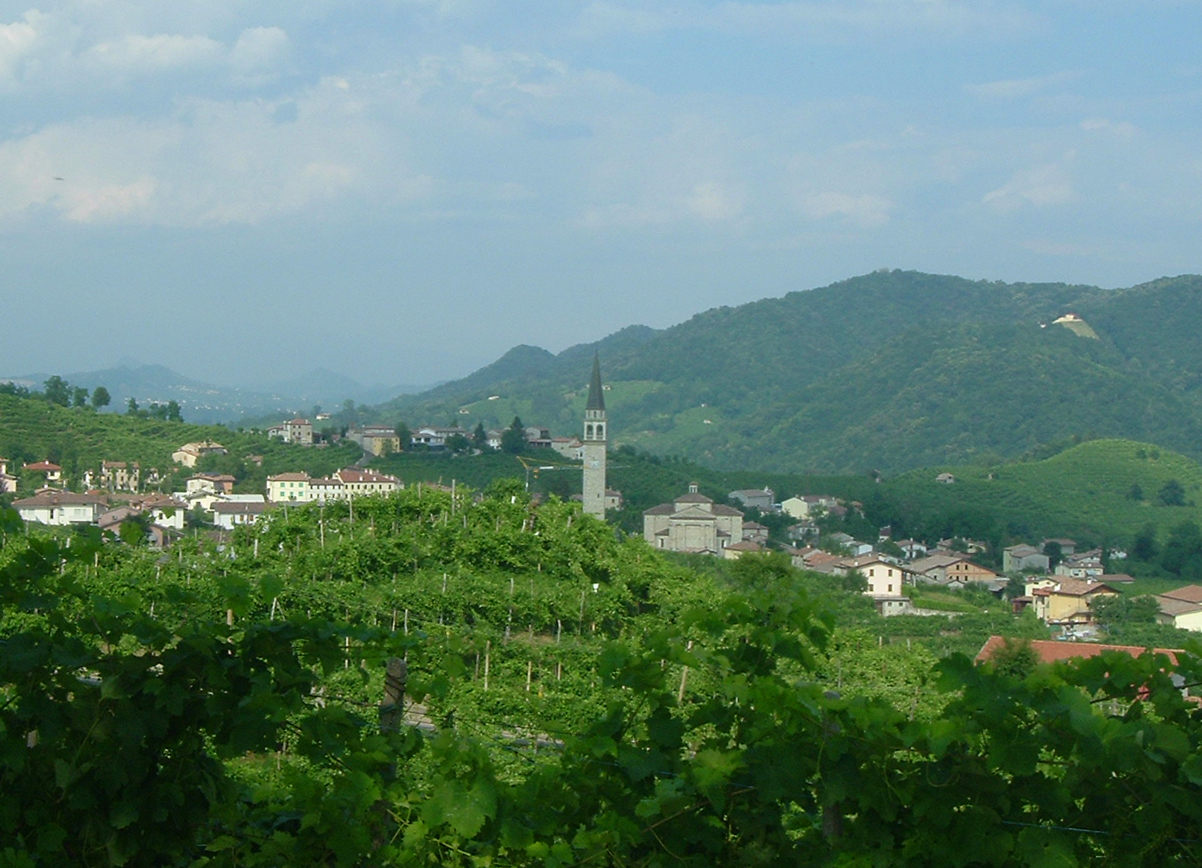
The individual time trial took the riders through the vineyards around Valdobbiadene.

The rest day included a transfer to Civitanova Marche on the Adriatic coast. The subsequent stages took the riders along the coast and then into the Dolomites. Immediately after the rest day, there were four relatively flat stages, although two of them included hills towards the end. These were followed by the race's only individual time trial. This was 59.2 kilometres (36.8 mi) in length and was one of the longest time trials in the Giro in recent years. It began with 30 kilometres (19 mi) of flat roads, which were followed by rolling roads towards the finish line in Valdobbiadene. After the time trial came the stage to Madonna di Campiglio, which included several other difficult climbs. This was followed by the second rest day.

The final week of the race began with a stage that crossed the very difficult Passo di Mortirolo on the way to a finish on a third-category climb in Aprica. Cycling Weekly described this as "this year's blockbuster stage". This was followed by one of the flattest stages of the race, which took the Giro out of Italy for the first time in 2015 as it crossed into Switzerland for a finish in Lugano. There were then three consecutive days with high mountains. The eighteenth stage of the race started in Melide, Switzerland in Switzerland and took the riders across the difficult Monte Ologno before a difficult descent to the finish. There were then two consecutive summit finishes on the Cervinia and on Sestriere. The final stage was a largely ceremonial flat stage towards a finish in Milan.

The highest climb of the 2015 Giro – known as the Cima Coppi – was the Colle delle Finestre on the penultimate stage. This was 2,178 metres (7,146 ft) above sea level. In general, the climbs were lower than in previous years, following controversy in the 2014 Giro over the crossing of the Stelvio Pass. The race organisers also tried to make the transfers between stages shorter.

List of stages
Stage	Date	Course	Distance	Type	Winner
1	9 May	San Lorenzo al Mare to Sanremo	17.6 km (11 mi)	Team time trial	Orica–GreenEDGE
2	10 May	Albenga to Genoa	177 km (110 mi)	Flat stage	Elia Viviani (ITA)
3	11 May	Rapallo to Sestri Levante	136 km (85 mi)	Medium-mountain stage	Michael Matthews (AUS)
4	12 May	Chiavari to La Spezia	150 km (93 mi)	Medium-mountain stage	Davide Formolo (ITA)
5	13 May	La Spezia to Abetone	152 km (94 mi)	Medium-mountain stage	Jan Polanc (SLO)
6	14 May	Montecatini Terme to Castiglione della Pescaia	183 km (114 mi)	Flat stage	André Greipel (GER)
7	15 May	Grosseto to Fiuggi	264 km (164 mi)	Flat stage	Diego Ulissi (ITA)
8	16 May	Fiuggi to Campitello Matese	186 km (116 mi)	Mountain stage	Beñat Intxausti (ESP)
9	17 May	Benevento to San Giorgio del Sannio	224 km (139 mi)	Medium-mountain stage	Paolo Tiralongo (ITA)
	18 May	Rest day (Civitanova Marche)			
10	19 May	Civitanova Marche to Forlì	200 km (124 mi)	Flat stage	Nicola Boem (ITA)
11	20 May	Forlì to Imola (Autodromo Enzo e Dino Ferrari)	153 km (95 mi)	Medium-mountain stage	Ilnur Zakarin (RUS)
12	21 May	Imola to Vicenza (Monte Berico)	190 km (118 mi)	Medium-mountain stage	Philippe Gilbert (BEL)
13	22 May	Montecchio Maggiore to Jesolo	147 km (91 mi)	Flat stage	Sacha Modolo (ITA)
14	23 May	Treviso to Valdobbiadene	59.4 km (37 mi)	Individual time trial	Vasil Kiryienka (BLR)
15	24 May	Marostica to Madonna di Campiglio	165 km (103 mi)	Mountain stage	Mikel Landa (ESP)
	25 May	Rest day (Madonna di Campiglio)			
16	26 May	Pinzolo to Aprica	174 km (108 mi)	Mountain stage	Mikel Landa (ESP)
17	27 May	Tirano to Lugano (Switzerland)	134 km (83 mi)	Flat stage	Sacha Modolo (ITA)
18	28 May	Melide (Switzerland) to Verbania	170 km (106 mi)	Medium-mountain stage	Philippe Gilbert (BEL)
19	29 May	Gravellona Toce to Cervinia	236 km (147 mi)	Mountain stage	Fabio Aru (ITA)
20	30 May	Saint-Vincent to Sestriere	196 km (122 mi)	Mountain stage	Fabio Aru (ITA)
21	31 May	Turin to Milan	185 km (115 mi)	Flat stage	Iljo Keisse (BEL)

== Race overview ==
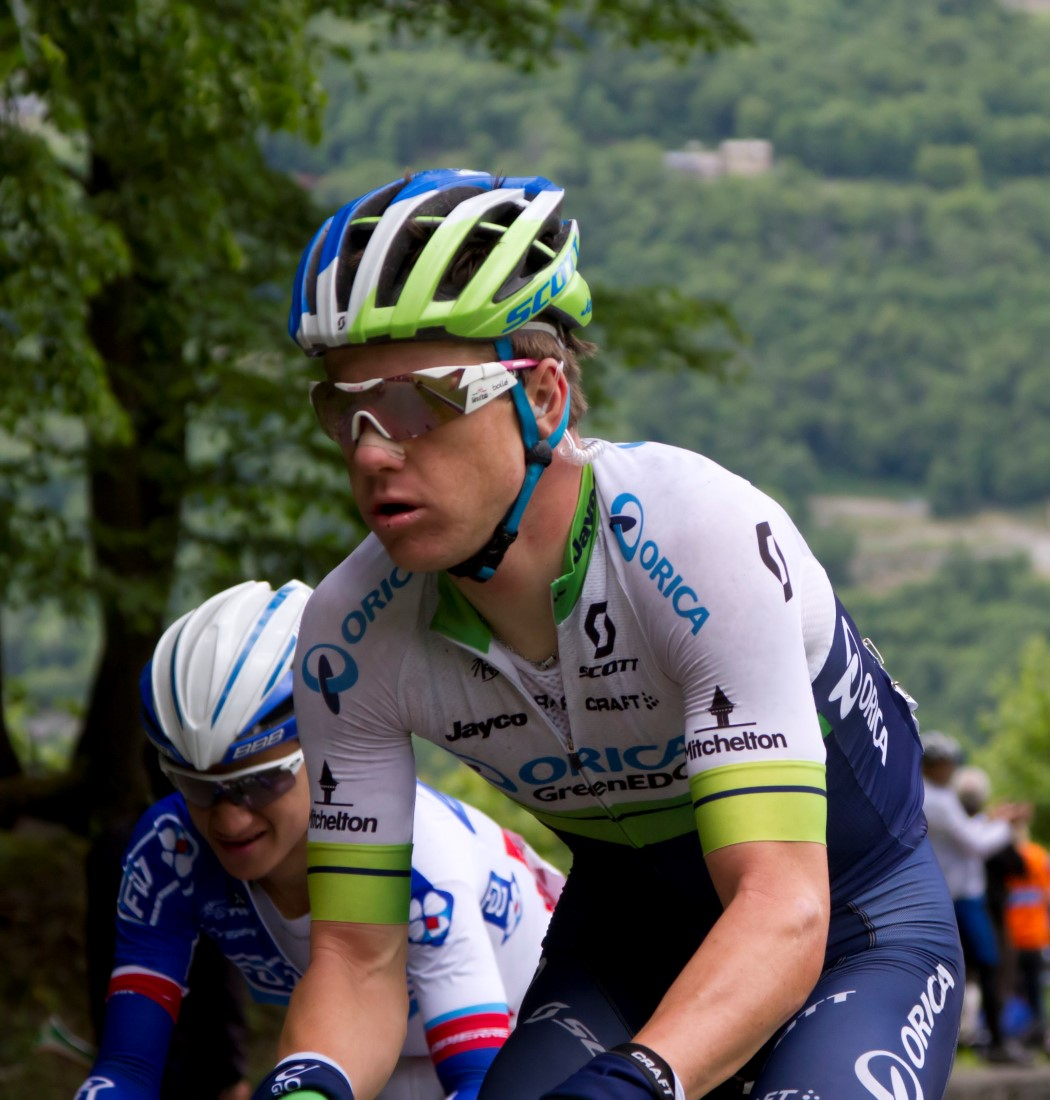
Simon Clarke was one of three Australian Orica–GreenEDGE riders to lead the Giro during the first week (photographed during stage 16).

Stage 1, the team time trial, was won by Orica–GreenEDGE. Simon Gerrans was the first rider to cross the line, so he became the first leader of the race. Tinkoff–Saxo were second, seven seconds slower, which made Contador the best-placed rider among the general classification favourites. He gained six seconds on Aru and twenty seconds on Porte. Elia Viviani won the sprint on stage 2; he therefore took the lead in the points classification. Michael Matthews finished seventh on the stage and moved into the pink jersey. Matthews extended his lead by winning stage 3 in a sprint from a reduced group. There was particular concern during the stage after Domenico Pozzovivo (AG2R La Mondiale) crashed on a descent; he abandoned the race and was taken to hospital. The fourth stage was won by Davide Formolo (Cannondale–Garmin) from an early breakaway. Astana raced aggressively in the second part of the stage and put significant pressure on the other general classification riders; Rigoberto Urán lost more than 40 seconds, while Tinkoff–Saxo appeared weak in support of Contador. Matthews lost around 20 minutes; Simon Clarke took over the lead of the race. Clarke was the third Australian rider for the Orica–GreenEDGE team to lead the 2015 Giro.

Stage 5, with its summit finish at Abetone, was also won by a rider from a breakaway, this time Jan Polanc (Lampre–Merida), who attacked on the final climb and won by more than a minute. The general classification favourites attacked on the final climb; Contador was the first to attack and was followed by Aru and Porte. They were then joined by Mikel Landa, Aru's teammate, and gained time over all the other riders. Clarke lost over two minutes to Contador, Aru and Porte; he therefore lost the lead in the general classification and Contador became the new leader of the race, two seconds ahead of Aru and twenty ahead of Porte. Contador's lead came under threat the following day. The stage was won by Greipel in a sprint finish, but there was a large crash in the final metres. This was caused by a spectator who was leaning over the crash barriers with a camera; Daniele Colli (Nippo–Vini Fantini) collided with him and caused a large number of riders to crash behind him. Contador was among the riders to crash; although he finished the stage on the same time as Greipel, he was treated for a shoulder injury by his team doctor and was unable to put on the leader's jersey on the podium. Despite suffering from the injury, Contador started and finished the following day's stage. This was won in a sprint finish by Diego Ulissi (Lampre–Mérida), while Contador retained the race lead.

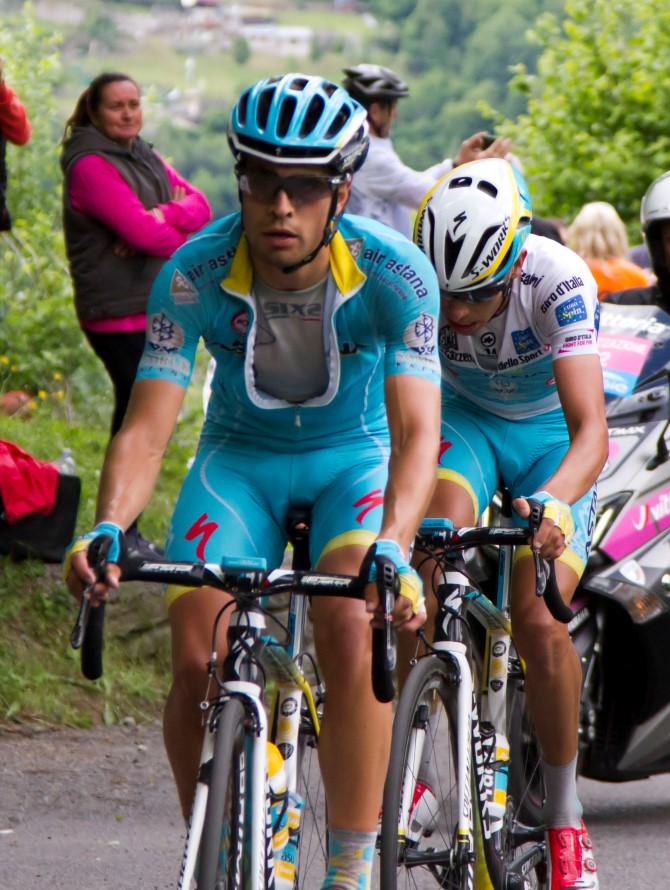
Mikel Landa (left) leading Fabio Aru (both Astana) during stage 16

Contador continued to be troubled by his injury during stage 8, which finished on the climb of the Campitello Matese. The stage was won by Beñat Intxausti (Movistar), who was in the day's early breakaway and attacked on the final climb. Astana again rode hard to put pressure on the other riders; eventually a group formed of Contador, Aru, Porte and Landa. Landa then attacked and finished second on the stage, 15 seconds ahead of the other three riders. He therefore moved up into fifth place overall, while Contador increased his lead over Aru by winning bonus seconds at an intermediate sprint. Stage 9 was also won by a rider from a breakaway: Paolo Tiralongo (Astana) took a solo victory. Aru, Contador, Porte and Landa were again alone in a group towards the end of the stage; although they came to the finish together, Aru took a second out of the others in the sprint. This moved him to three seconds behind Contador. The following day was the first rest day of the race.

After the rest day, stage 10 was once again won by a rider from a breakaway: Nicola Boem (Bardiani–CSF) sprinted to the victory from a small group. A large group – including Contador, Aru and Landa – finished together. Porte, however, suffered a mechanical problem in the final 10 kilometres (6.2 mi) and he was unable to regain contact with the main group, despite assistance from his teammates and from Michael Matthews, Porte's fellow Australian. Porte lost over 40 seconds to the other general classification favourites. After the stage, it was revealed that Porte had been given assistance by another Australian Orica–GreenEDGE rider, Simon Clarke. Clarke had seen Porte waiting for assistance and had given him one of his own wheels. This was illegal under UCI rules that prohibit "non-regulation assistance to a rider from another team"; Porte was therefore given a two-minute time penalty and dropped to twelfth place, over three minutes behind Contador, with Landa moving up to third place.

Stage 11 was won by Ilnur Zakarin, who attacked from an all-day breakaway 23 kilometres (14 mi) from the finish line and rode solo to the finish. The general classification favourites all finished together. Stage 12 finished with a short, steep climb. It was won by Philippe Gilbert (BMC). Contador finished second to win six bonus seconds; his lead was further extended as Aru and Landa both lost several seconds on the climb. Contador lost the lead the following day, however. The stage was won in a bunch sprint by Sacha Modolo (Lampre–Merida); just over 3 kilometres (1.9 mi) before the finish line, however, there was a large crash that delayed a large number of riders. Contador was one of the riders delayed in the crash; he lost 36 seconds to Aru, who therefore took over the race lead. Porte was also caught up in the crash and lost another two minutes.

Stage 14 was the individual time trial, which was won by Vasil Kiryienka (Sky). Contador finished third on the stage, nearly three minutes ahead of Aru. Contador therefore moved back into the race lead. Contador passed Landa on the road, despite starting three minutes after him; Landa lost over four minutes and fell to seventh place overall. Movistar's Andrey Amador moved up into third. Stage 15 was the final stage of the second week and was the climb to Madonna di Campiglio. Landa won the stage after Astana rode hard on the final climb; he finished five seconds ahead of Contador and moved back up to fourth place. Contador finished a second ahead of Aru and extended his lead further due to bonus seconds for his third-place finish. Porte, who had lost over 30 minutes during the weekend following the crash in stage 13, withdrew from the race after the stage.

After the rest day, Landa won a second consecutive stage. Contador had suffered a puncture at the foot of the penultimate climb – the Mortirolo – and at one point was nearly a minute behind Landa and Aru. Contador caught Landa and Aru, however, then attacked them. Although Landa was able to follow Contador's attack, Aru was not. On the final climb to Aprica, Landa attacked and won the stage, 38 seconds ahead of Contador. Aru, meanwhile, lost nearly three minutes to Landa. Landa moved up into second place, although he was still over four minutes behind Contador, with Aru now third. Sacha Modolo won his second stage the following day, in a sprint finish, with Giacomo Nizzolo (Trek Factory Racing) moving into the lead of the points classification. Philippe Gilbert also won a second stage of the 2015 Giro on stage 18, escaping in a breakaway early in the day and attacking 19 kilometres (12 mi) from the finish to take a solo victory. Contador again increased his lead, however: after Aru and Landa were caught behind a crash, Contador ordered his team to attack. Cyclingnews.com suggested this was revenge for Astana's attack on stage 16. Contador then attacked alone and, after cooperation with Ryder Hesjedal, gained more than a minute on his rivals. Landa was second, over five minutes behind, with Aru a further 50 seconds back.

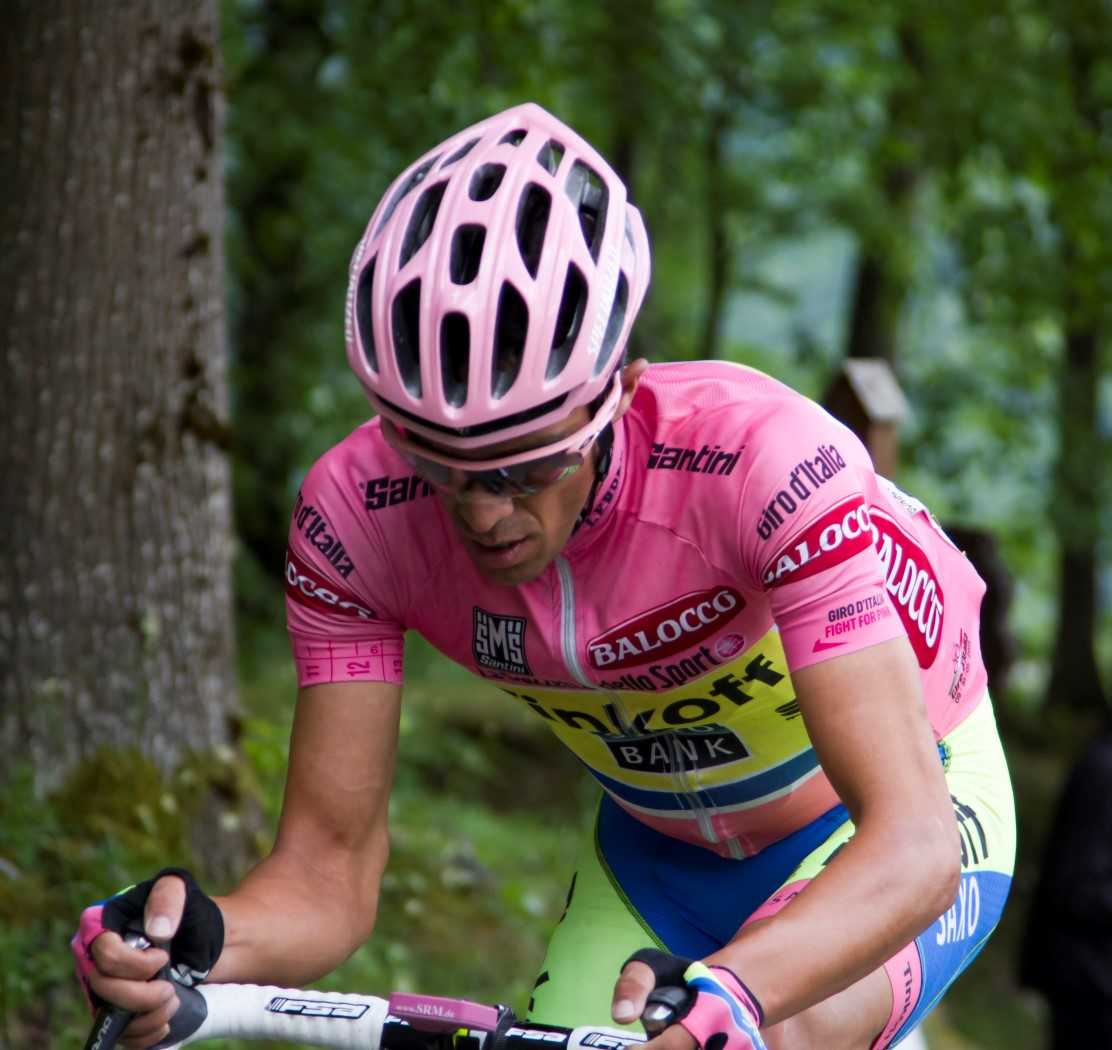
Alberto Contador (Tinkoff–Saxo) wearing the pink jersey as leader of the general classification during stage 16

Stage 19 was the first of two consecutive summit finishes. The stage was won by Aru, who attacked early in the final climb. Contador was content to let the other riders dictate the pace in the chasing group, which finished over a minute behind Aru. Landa finished in the same group; Aru therefore moved back ahead of him into second place overall. Aru won again on stage 20, the final difficult stage of the Giro. Contador was isolated from his teammates early in the first of the day's two climbs. The roads towards the top of the climb – the Colle delle Finestre – were gravel. Landa attacked around this point and Contador was unable to follow. With Contador struggling, the other riders in the group attacked. Contador was a minute behind them at the summit, with Landa further ahead. At the foot of the final climb, Landa was ordered by his team to wait for Aru with the hope that, by working together, the two riders could put enough time into Contador to win the Giro. Aru attacked in the final kilometres of the final climb to Sestriere and won the stage. Landa was 24 seconds behind. Despite losing over two minutes, Contador retained his race lead.

The final stage of the Giro was a flat stage ending with several laps of a circuit in Milan. It was not expected to affect the general classification, with a bunch sprint the likely conclusion. There was an attack on the finishing circuit, however, by Iljo Keisse (Etixx–Quick-Step) and Luke Durbridge (Orica–GreenEDGE). Although they never had more than a minute's lead, they were able to stay away from the peloton to the finish. Keisse won the sprint between the pair for the stage victory. Contador finished in the leading group to secure the overall victory, just under two minutes ahead of Aru. Contador thus won the overall 2015 Giro d'Italia without winning any stage victories.

== Classification leadership ==
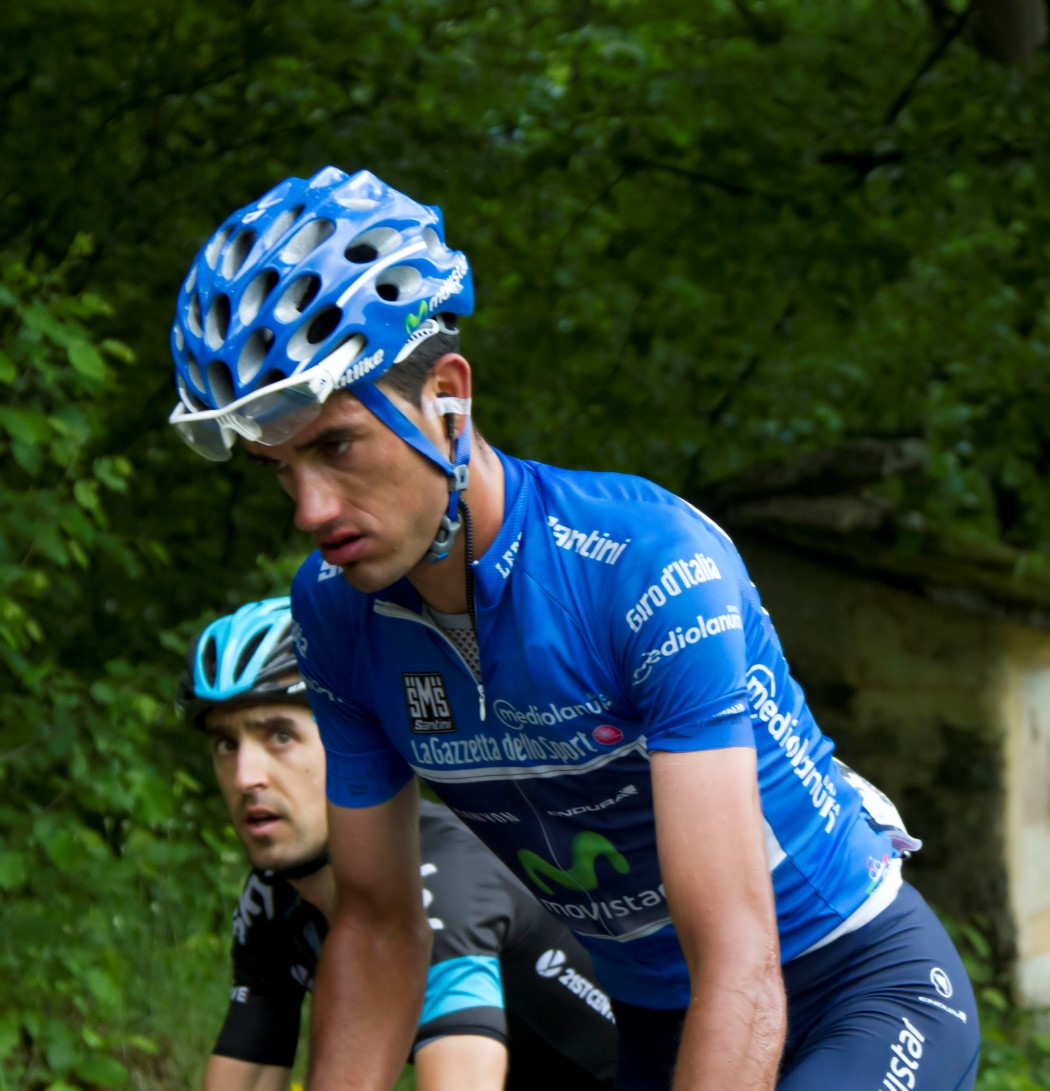
Beñat Intxausti (Movistar) wearing the blue jersey as leader of the mountains classification during stage 16. The classification was won by his teammate Giovanni Visconti.

In the 2015 Giro d'Italia, four different jerseys were awarded. The first and most important is the general classification, calculated by adding each rider's finishing times on each stage. Riders received time bonuses for finishing in the first three places on each stage (excluding the team time trial and individual time trial). The rider with the lowest cumulative time was awarded the pink jersey (the maglia rosa) and was considered the winner of the Giro d'Italia.

Additionally, there was a points classification. Riders won points for finishing in the top 15 on each stage. Flat stages award more points that mountainous stages, meaning that this classification tends to favour sprinters. In addition, points can be won in intermediate sprints. The winner of the points classification won the red jersey.

There was also a mountains classification. Points were awarded for reaching the top of a climb towards the front of the race. Each climb will be categorized as either first, second, third, or fourth-category, with more points available for the higher-categorized climbs. The Cima Coppi, the race's highest point of elevation, awards more points than the other first-category climbs. At 2,178 metres (7,146 ft), the Cima Coppi for the 2015 Giro d'Italia was the unpaved Colle delle Finestre.

The fourth jersey represented the young rider classification. This was decided the same way as the general classification, but only riders born after 1 January 1990 were eligible. The winner of the classification was awarded a white jersey.

There were also two classifications for teams. In the Trofeo Fast Team classification, the times of the best three cyclists per team on each stage were added up; the leading team was the team with the lowest total time. The Trofeo Super Team was a team points classification, with the top 20 placed riders on each stage earning points (20 for first place, 19 for second place and so on, down to a single point for 20th) for their team.

Classification leadership by stage
Stage	Winner	General classification	Points classification	Mountains classification	Young rider classification	Trofeo Fast Team	Trofeo Super Team
1	Orica–GreenEDGE	Simon Gerrans	not awarded	not awarded	Michael Matthews	Orica–GreenEDGE	Orica–GreenEDGE
2	Elia Viviani	Michael Matthews	Elia Viviani	Bert-Jan Lindeman	Michael Matthews	Orica–GreenEDGE	Orica–GreenEDGE
3	Michael Matthews	Michael Matthews	Elia Viviani	Pavel Kochetkov	Michael Matthews	Orica–GreenEDGE	Orica–GreenEDGE
4	Davide Formolo	Simon Clarke	Elia Viviani	Pavel Kochetkov	Esteban Chaves	Astana	Orica–GreenEDGE
5	Jan Polanc	Alberto Contador	Elia Viviani	Jan Polanc	Fabio Aru	Astana	Orica–GreenEDGE
6	André Greipel	Alberto Contador	André Greipel	Jan Polanc	Fabio Aru	Astana	Orica–GreenEDGE
7	Diego Ulissi	Alberto Contador	Elia Viviani	Jan Polanc	Fabio Aru	Astana	Orica–GreenEDGE
8	Beñat Intxausti	Alberto Contador	Elia Viviani	Beñat Intxausti	Fabio Aru	Astana	Orica–GreenEDGE
9	Paolo Tiralongo	Alberto Contador	Elia Viviani	Simon Geschke	Fabio Aru	Astana	Astana
10	Nicola Boem	Alberto Contador	Nicola Boem	Simon Geschke	Fabio Aru	Astana	Astana
11	Ilnur Zakarin	Alberto Contador	Nicola Boem	Beñat Intxausti	Fabio Aru	Astana	Astana
12	Philippe Gilbert	Alberto Contador	Nicola Boem	Beñat Intxausti	Fabio Aru	Astana	Astana
13	Sacha Modolo	Fabio Aru	Elia Viviani	Beñat Intxausti	Fabio Aru	Astana	Astana
14	Vasil Kiryienka	Alberto Contador	Elia Viviani	Beñat Intxausti	Fabio Aru	Astana	Astana
15	Mikel Landa	Alberto Contador	Elia Viviani	Beñat Intxausti	Fabio Aru	Astana	Astana
16	Mikel Landa	Alberto Contador	Elia Viviani	Steven Kruijswijk	Fabio Aru	Astana	Astana
17	Sacha Modolo	Alberto Contador	Giacomo Nizzolo	Steven Kruijswijk	Fabio Aru	Astana	Astana
18	Philippe Gilbert	Alberto Contador	Giacomo Nizzolo	Steven Kruijswijk	Fabio Aru	Astana	Astana
19	Fabio Aru	Alberto Contador	Giacomo Nizzolo	Giovanni Visconti	Fabio Aru	Astana	Astana
20	Fabio Aru	Alberto Contador	Giacomo Nizzolo	Giovanni Visconti	Fabio Aru	Astana	Astana
21	Iljo Keisse	Alberto Contador	Giacomo Nizzolo	Giovanni Visconti	Fabio Aru	Astana	Astana
Final		Alberto Contador	Giacomo Nizzolo	Giovanni Visconti	Fabio Aru	Astana	Astana

Notes

- In stage 3, Esteban Chaves, who was second in the young riders classification, wore the white jersey, because Michael Matthews (in first place) wore the pink jersey as leader of the general classification during that stage.
- In stage 14, Davide Formolo, who was second in the young riders classification, wore the white jersey, because Fabio Aru (in first place) wore the pink jersey as leader of the general classification during that stage.

== Final standings ==
Legend
General classification	Denotes the leader of the General classification	Mountains classification	Denotes the leader of the Mountains classification
Points classification	Denotes the leader of the Points classification	Young rider classification	Denotes the leader of the Young rider classification

=== General classification ===
Final general classification (1–10)
	Rider	Team	Time
1	Alberto Contador (ESP)	Tinkoff–Saxo	88h 22' 25"
2	Fabio Aru (ITA)	Astana	+ 1' 53"
3	Mikel Landa (ESP)	Astana	+ 3' 05"
4	Andrey Amador (CRC)	Movistar Team	+ 8' 10"
5	Ryder Hesjedal (CAN)	Cannondale–Garmin	+ 9' 52"
6	Leopold König (CZE)	Team Sky	+ 10' 41"
7	Steven Kruijswijk (NED)	LottoNL–Jumbo	+ 10' 53"
8	Damiano Caruso (ITA)	BMC Racing Team	+ 12' 08"
9	Alexandre Geniez (FRA)	FDJ	+ 15' 51"
10	Yuri Trofimov (RUS)	Team Katusha	+ 16' 14"

Final general classification (11–163)
11	Maxime Monfort (BEL)	Lotto–Soudal	+ 17' 51"
12	Jurgen Van den Broeck (BEL)	Lotto–Soudal	+ 25' 12"
13	Tanel Kangert (EST)	Astana	+ 28' 05"
14	Rigoberto Urán (COL)	Etixx–Quick-Step	+ 28' 26"
15	Amaël Moinard (FRA)	BMC Racing Team	+ 30' 35"
16	Darwin Atapuma (COL)	BMC Racing Team	+ 40' 36"
17	Mikel Nieve (ESP)	Team Sky	+ 48' 24"
18	Giovanni Visconti (ITA)	Movistar Team	+ 50' 32"
19	Paolo Tiralongo (ITA)	Astana	+ 1h 03' 38"
20	Carlos Betancur (COL)	AG2R La Mondiale	+ 1h 17' 27"
21	André Cardoso (POR)	Cannondale–Garmin	+ 1h 19' 27"
22	Stefano Pirazzi (ITA)	Bardiani–CSF	+ 1h 21' 38"
23	Diego Rosa (ITA)	Astana	+ 1h 24' 57"
24	Franco Pellizotti (ITA)	Androni Giocattoli–Sidermec	+ 1h 30' 49"
25	Dario Cataldo (ITA)	Astana	+ 1h 35' 24"
26	Kanstantsin Sivtsov (BLR)	Team Sky	+ 1h 45' 52"
27	Jon Izagirre (ESP)	Movistar Team	+ 1h 46' 30"
28	Roman Kreuziger (CZE)	Tinkoff–Saxo	+ 1h 47' 03"
29	Beñat Intxausti (ESP)	Movistar Team	+ 1h 49' 22"
30	Jonathan Monsalve (VEN)	Southeast Pro Cycling	+ 1h 50' 19"
31	Davide Formolo (ITA)	Cannondale–Garmin	+ 1h 53' 39"
32	Fabio Felline (ITA)	Trek Factory Racing	+ 1h 55' 57"
33	Michael Rogers (AUS)	Tinkoff–Saxo	+ 2h 11' 06"
34	David de la Cruz (ESP)	Etixx–Quick-Step	+ 2h 15' 27"
35	Luis León Sánchez (ESP)	Astana	+ 2h 17' 30"
36	Sylvain Chavanel (FRA)	IAM Cycling	+ 2h 22' 52"
37	Pavel Kochetkov (RUS)	Team Katusha	+ 2h 23' 10"
38	Igor Antón (ESP)	Movistar Team	+ 2h 27' 19"
39	Philippe Gilbert (BEL)	BMC Racing Team	+ 2h 30' 21"
40	Przemysław Niemiec (POL)	Lampre–Merida	+ 2h 39' 20"
41	Sebastián Henao (COL)	Team Sky	+ 2h 39' 28"
42	Hubert Dupont (FRA)	AG2R La Mondiale	+ 2h 44' 08"
43	Francis Mourey (FRA)	FDJ	+ 2h 44' 29"
44	Ilnur Zakarin (RUS)	Team Katusha	+ 2h 45' 10"
45	Sylwester Szmyd (POL)	CCC–Sprandi–Polkowice	+ 2h 45' 21"
46	Kenny Elissonde (FRA)	FDJ	+ 2h 46' 57"
47	Maxime Bouet (FRA)	Etixx–Quick-Step	+ 2h 48' 49"
48	Branislau Samoilau (BLR)	CCC–Sprandi–Polkowice	+ 2h 49' 01"
49	Alessandro Bisolti (ITA)	Nippo–Vini Fantini	+ 2h 51' 45"
50	Simone Stortoni (ITA)	Androni Giocattoli–Sidermec	+ 2h 51' 48"
51	Ivan Basso (ITA)	Tinkoff–Saxo	+ 2h 52' 16"
52	Silvan Dillier (SUI)	BMC Racing Team	+ 2h 53' 04"
53	Jan Polanc (SLO)	Lampre–Merida	+ 2h 55' 08"
54	Matteo Montaguti (ITA)	AG2R La Mondiale	+ 3h 01' 35"
55	Esteban Chaves (COL)	Orica–GreenEDGE	+ 3h 01' 37"
56	Martijn Keizer (NED)	LottoNL–Jumbo	+ 3h 02' 04"
57	Mauro Finetto (ITA)	Southeast Pro Cycling	+ 3h 05' 25"
58	Francesco Gavazzi (ITA)	Southeast Pro Cycling	+ 3h 06' 40"
59	Andrey Zeits (KAZ)	Astana	+ 3h 09' 32"
60	Francesco Manuel Bongiorno (ITA)	Bardiani–CSF	+ 3h 12' 36"
61	Grega Bole (SLO)	CCC–Sprandi–Polkowice	+ 3h 15' 43"
62	Rubén Fernández (ESP)	Movistar Team	+ 3h 18' 16"
63	Simon Clarke (AUS)	Orica–GreenEDGE	+ 3h 20' 33"
64	Diego Ulissi (ITA)	Lampre–Merida	+ 3h 20' 48"
65	Sander Armée (BEL)	Lotto–Soudal	+ 3h 21' 35"
66	Brent Bookwalter (USA)	BMC Racing Team	+ 3h 21' 47"
67	Nate Brown (USA)	Cannondale–Garmin	+ 3h 23' 43"
68	Salvatore Puccio (ITA)	Team Sky	+ 3h 30' 11"
69	Clément Chevrier (FRA)	IAM Cycling	+ 3h 31' 24"
70	Marcus Burghardt (DEU)	BMC Racing Team	+ 3h 33' 49"
71	Gianfranco Zilioli (ITA)	Androni Giocattoli–Sidermec	+ 3h 34' 29"
72	Sergey Lagutin (RUS)	Team Katusha	+ 3h 36' 11"
73	Rinaldo Nocentini (ITA)	AG2R La Mondiale	+ 3h 36' 24"
74	Jesús Herrada (ESP)	Movistar Team	+ 3h 40' 04"
75	Axel Domont (FRA)	AG2R La Mondiale	+ 3h 40' 42"
76	Tom-Jelte Slagter (NED)	Cannondale–Garmin	+ 3h 43' 59"
77	Adam Hansen (AUS)	Lotto–Soudal	+ 3h 49' 51"
78	Davide Villella (ITA)	Cannondale–Garmin	+ 3h 57' 09"
79	Maciej Paterski (POL)	CCC–Sprandi–Polkowice	+ 3h 58' 14"
80	Manuele Mori (ITA)	Lampre–Merida	+ 3h 59' 30"
81	Marek Rutkiewicz (POL)	CCC–Sprandi–Polkowice	+ 4h 00' 37"
82	Edoardo Zardini (ITA)	Bardiani–CSF	+ 4h 00' 50"
83	Tobias Ludvigsson (SWE)	Team Giant–Alpecin	+ 4h 02' 19"
84	Vasil Kiryienka (BLR)	Team Sky	+ 4h 03' 27"
85	Davide Malacarne (ITA)	Astana	+ 4h 04' 18"
86	Nick van der Lijke (NED)	LottoNL–Jumbo	+ 4h 06' 57"
87	Anthony Roux (FRA)	FDJ	+ 4h 14' 22"
88	Luca Chirico (ITA)	Bardiani–CSF	+ 4h 16' 30"
89	Simon Geschke (DEU)	Team Giant–Alpecin	+ 4h 16' 52"
90	Lars Bak (DEN)	Lotto–Soudal	+ 4h 20' 23"
91	Tsgabu Grmay (ETH)	Lampre–Merida	+ 4h 20' 33"
92	Pieter Weening (NED)	Orica–GreenEDGE	+ 4h 20' 38"
93	Dayer Quintana (COL)	Movistar Team	+ 4h 21' 18"
94	Patrick Gretsch (DEU)	AG2R La Mondiale	+ 4h 25' 13"
95	Bert-Jan Lindeman (NED)	LottoNL–Jumbo	+ 4h 26' 02"
96	Manuele Boaro (ITA)	Tinkoff–Saxo	+ 4h 26' 32"
97	Sérgio Paulinho (POR)	Tinkoff–Saxo	+ 4h 32' 23"
98	Marco Frapporti (ITA)	Androni Giocattoli–Sidermec	+ 4h 33' 17"
99	Chad Haga (USA)	Team Giant–Alpecin	+ 4h 34' 18"
100	Sonny Colbrelli (ITA)	Bardiani–CSF	+ 4h 34' 27"
101	Giacomo Berlato (ITA)	Nippo–Vini Fantini	+ 4h 35' 09"
102	Maxim Belkov (RUS)	Team Katusha	+ 4h 35' 43"
103	Kévin Reza (FRA)	FDJ	+ 4h 37' 05"
104	Elia Favilli (ITA)	Southeast Pro Cycling	+ 4h 40' 04"
105	Julien Bérard (FRA)	AG2R La Mondiale	+ 4h 42' 01"
106	Matteo Busato (ITA)	Southeast Pro Cycling	+ 4h 42' 22"
107	Heinrich Haussler (AUS)	IAM Cycling	+ 4h 43' 01"
108	Pierpaolo De Negri (ITA)	Nippo–Vini Fantini	+ 4h 46' 51"
109	Luke Durbridge (AUS)	Orica–GreenEDGE	+ 4h 50' 24"
110	Fabio Sabatini (ITA)	Etixx–Quick-Step	+ 4h 52' 39"
111	Luca Paolini (ITA)	Team Katusha	+ 4h 54' 31"
112	Matteo Tosatto (ITA)	Tinkoff–Saxo	+ 4h 54' 45"
113	Hugo Houle (CAN)	AG2R La Mondiale	+ 4h 54' 57"
114	Sergey Chernetskiy (RUS)	Team Katusha	+ 5h 00' 19"
115	Ivan Rovny (RUS)	Tinkoff–Saxo	+ 5h 00' 44"
116	Petr Vakoč (CZE)	Etixx–Quick-Step	+ 5h 01' 14"
117	Fumiyuki Beppu (JPN)	Trek Factory Racing	+ 5h 02' 43"
118	Łukasz Owsian (POL)	CCC–Sprandi–Polkowice	+ 5h 04' 07"
119	Maarten Tjallingii (NED)	LottoNL–Jumbo	+ 5h 07' 22"
120	Janier Acevedo (COL)	Cannondale–Garmin	+ 5h 09' 07"
121	Cédric Pineau (FRA)	FDJ	+ 5h 10' 03"
122	Sam Bewley (NZL)	Orica–GreenEDGE	+ 5h 10' 21"
123	Davide Appollonio (ITA)	Androni Giocattoli–Sidermec	+ 5h 11' 20"
124	Arnaud Courteille (FRA)	FDJ	+ 5h 12' 26"
125	Elia Viviani (ITA)	Team Sky	+ 5h 14' 35"
126	Sacha Modolo (ITA)	Lampre–Merida	+ 5h 16' 43"
127	Maximiliano Richeze (ARG)	Lampre–Merida	+ 5h 16' 51"
128	Brett Lancaster (AUS)	Orica–GreenEDGE	+ 5h 18' 55"
129	Nikolay Mihaylov (BUL)	CCC–Sprandi–Polkowice	+ 5h 20' 57"
130	Murilo Fischer (BRA)	FDJ	+ 5h 23' 37"
131	Alan Marangoni (ITA)	Cannondale–Garmin	+ 5h 24' 22"
132	Alexander Porsev (RUS)	Team Katusha	+ 5h 26' 12"
133	Roberto Ferrari (ITA)	Lampre–Merida	+ 5h 26' 53"
134	Caleb Fairly (USA)	Team Giant–Alpecin	+ 5h 27' 03"
135	Christopher Juul-Jensen (DEN)	Tinkoff–Saxo	+ 5h 30' 09"
136	Moreno Hofland (NED)	LottoNL–Jumbo	+ 5h 32' 46"
137	Giacomo Nizzolo (ITA)	Trek Factory Racing	+ 5h 33' 26"
138	Luka Mezgec (SLO)	Team Giant–Alpecin	+ 5h 34' 36"
139	Serghei Țvetcov (ROU)	Androni Giocattoli–Sidermec	+ 5h 35' 03"
140	Bartłomiej Matysiak (POL)	CCC–Sprandi–Polkowice	+ 5h 37' 55"
141	Eugenio Alafaci (ITA)	Trek Factory Racing	+ 5h 38' 12"
142	Rick Zabel (DEU)	BMC Racing Team	+ 5h 42' 25"
143	Bernhard Eisel (AUT)	Team Sky	+ 5h 42' 37"
144	Rick Flens (NED)	LottoNL–Jumbo	+ 5h 45' 15"
145	Iljo Keisse (BEL)	Etixx–Quick-Step	+ 5h 46' 04"
146	Boy van Poppel (NED)	Trek Factory Racing	+ 5h 48' 23"
147	Jussi Veikkanen (FIN)	FDJ	+ 5h 48' 41"
148	Nikias Arndt (DEU)	Team Giant–Alpecin	+ 5h 53' 20"
149	Fábio Silvestre (POR)	Trek Factory Racing	+ 5h 54' 39"
150	Eduard-Michael Grosu (ROU)	Nippo–Vini Fantini	+ 5h 54' 43"
151	Calvin Watson (AUS)	Trek Factory Racing	+ 5h 56' 12"
152	Riccardo Stacchiotti (ITA)	Nippo–Vini Fantini	+ 5h 59' 25"
153	Tom Stamsnijder (NED)	Team Giant–Alpecin	+ 6h 00' 08"
154	Alessandro Malaguti (ITA)	Nippo–Vini Fantini	+ 6h 03' 41"
155	Marco Bandiera (ITA)	Androni Giocattoli–Sidermec	+ 6h 06' 50"
156	Ji Cheng (CHN)	Team Giant–Alpecin	+ 6h 09' 33"
157	Eugert Zhupa (ALB)	Southeast Pro Cycling	+ 6h 10' 11"
158	Bert De Backer (BEL)	Team Giant–Alpecin	+ 6h 10' 15"
159	Nicola Boem (ITA)	Bardiani–CSF	+ 6h 10' 26"
160	Michael Hepburn (AUS)	Orica–GreenEDGE	+ 6h 13' 16"
161	Aleksejs Saramotins (LAT)	IAM Cycling	+ 6h 22' 00"
162	Roger Kluge (DEU)	IAM Cycling	+ 6h 33' 40"
163	Marco Coledan (ITA)	Trek Factory Racing	+ 6h 40' 13"

=== Mountains classification ===
Final mountains classification (1–10)
	Rider	Team	Points
1	Giovanni Visconti (ITA)	Movistar Team	125
2	Mikel Landa (ESP)	Astana	122
3	Steven Kruijswijk (NED)	LottoNL–Jumbo	115
4	Beñat Intxausti (ESP)	Movistar Team	107
5	Fabio Aru (ITA)	Astana	80
6	Carlos Betancur (COL)	AG2R La Mondiale	75
7	Ryder Hesjedal (CAN)	Cannondale–Garmin	70
8	Simon Geschke (GER)	Team Giant–Alpecin	53
9	Pavel Kochetkov (RUS)	Team Katusha	52
10	Alberto Contador (ESP)	Tinkoff–Saxo	51

=== Points classification ===
Final points classification (1–10)
	Rider	Team	Points
1	Giacomo Nizzolo (ITA)	Trek Factory Racing	181
2	Philippe Gilbert (BEL)	BMC Racing Team	148
3	Sacha Modolo (ITA)	Lampre–Merida	147
4	Elia Viviani (ITA)	Team Sky	144
5	Nicola Boem (ITA)	Bardiani–CSF	127
6	Iljo Keisse (BEL)	Etixx–Quick-Step	98
7	Alberto Contador (ESP)	Tinkoff–Saxo	96
8	Marco Bandiera (ITA)	Androni Giocattoli–Sidermec	92
9	Diego Ulissi (ITA)	Lampre–Merida	83
10	Luka Mezgec (SLO)	Team Giant–Alpecin	78

=== Young riders classification ===
Final young rider classification (1–10)
	Rider	Team	Time
1	Fabio Aru (ITA)	Astana	88h 24' 18"
2	Davide Formolo (ITA)	Cannondale–Garmin	+ 1h 51' 46"
3	Fabio Felline (ITA)	Trek Factory Racing	+ 1h 54' 04"
4	Sebastián Henao (COL)	Team Sky	+ 2h 37' 35"
5	Kenny Elissonde (FRA)	FDJ	+ 2h 45' 04"
6	Silvan Dillier (SUI)	BMC Racing Team	+ 2h 51' 11"
7	Jan Polanc (SLO)	Lampre–Merida	+ 2h 53' 15"
8	Esteban Chaves (COL)	Orica–GreenEDGE	+ 2h 59' 44"
9	Francesco Bongiorno (ITA)	Bardiani–CSF	+ 3h 10' 43"
10	Rubén Fernández (ESP)	Movistar Team	+ 3h 16' 23"

=== Trofeo Fast Team classification ===
Final team classification (1–10)
	Team	Time
1	(Kazakhstan) Astana	264h 42' 31"
2	(United States) BMC Racing Team	+ 43' 16"
3	(United Kingdom) Team Sky	+ 1h 13' 51"
4	(Spain) Movistar Team	+ 1h 20' 16"
5	(United States) Cannondale–Garmin	+ 2h 26' 57"
6	(Belgium) Lotto–Soudal	+ 3h 02' 42"
7	(Russia) Tinkoff–Saxo	+ 3h 14' 36"
8	(Russia) Team Katusha	+ 3h 32' 21"
9	(France) FDJ	+ 4h 27' 13"
10	(Belgium) Etixx–Quick-Step	+ 4h 43' 52"

=== Trofeo Super Team classification ===
Final team points classification (1–10)
	Team	Points
1	(Kazakhstan) Astana	640
2	(United States) BMC Racing Team	334
3	(Italy) Lampre–Merida	317
4	(United Kingdom) Team Sky	284
5	(Spain) Movistar Team	272
6	(Australia) Orica–GreenEDGE	251
7	(Netherlands) LottoNL–Jumbo	239
8	(Italy) Bardiani–CSF	238
9	(Russia) Tinkoff–Saxo	233
10	(Russia) Team Katusha	233

=== Minor classifications ===
Several other minor classifications were awarded. The first of these was the intermediate sprint classification (Italian: Traguardi Volanti). Each road stage had two sprints during the stage. The first five riders across the intermediate sprint line were awarded points; the rider with the most points at the end of the race won the classification. This classification was won by Marco Bandiera (Androni Giocattoli–Sidermec). A similar classification, the Azzuri d'Italia prize, was decided by points awarded to the top three riders on each stage. It was similar to the points classification, but with fewer riders awarded points. The classification was won by Mikel Landa. Another classification – the combativity prize (Italian: Premio Combattivita) – involved points awarded to the first riders at the stage finishes, at intermediate sprints and at the summits of categorised climbs. It was won by Philippe Gilbert.

There was also a breakaway award (Italian: Premio della Fuga). For this, points were awarded to each rider in any breakaway smaller than 10 riders that escaped for at least 5 kilometres (3.1 mi). Each rider was awarded a point for each kilometre that he was away from the peloton. The rider with the most points at the end of the Giro won the award. The classification was also won by Bandiera. The final individual classification was the "energy classification" (Italian: Premio Energy). In each stage, the fastest three riders in the final 3 kilometres (1.9 mi) of the stage were awarded points. The rider with the most points at the end of the Giro won the classification. The award was won by Fabio Aru.

The final classification was a "fair play" ranking for each team. Teams were given penalty points for infringing various rules. These ranged from a half-point penalty for offences that merited a warning from the race officials to a 2000-point penalty for a positive doping test. The team that had the lowest points total at the end of the Giro won the classification. It was won by Nippo–Vini Fantini, who did not receive any penalty points during the Giro.
