= Immediate Media Company =

British publishing house

Immediate Media Company Limited
- Industry: Publishing house
- Predecessor: Magicalia, BBC Magazines, Origin Publishing
- Founded: London and Bristol, England (1 November 2011)
- Headquarters: London, W6; United Kingdom
- Key people: CEO Tom Bureau
- Number of employees: 1,300
- Parent: Hubert Burda Media
- Website: www.immediate.co.uk

Immediate Media Company Limited (with IMMEDIATE styled in all uppercase as its logo) is a British multinational publishing house that produces a wide range of magazine titles, including Radio Times, BBC Top Gear, Good Food and many others. In H1 2018, the company's titles reported a combined ABC circulation of 1.59 million, including 1.1M active subscribers. In 2018 it reported selling 70+ million magazines.

The publishing house is owned by Hubert Burda Media, and is an agglomeration of Magicalia, Origin Publishing and BBC Magazines, publishing both media content and software platforms. Approximately 85% of its revenue is from content services, with the remainder from advertising.

Immediate Media also owns Immediate Live, a business that launches nationwide live events, including Good Food Shows, Knitting & Stitching Shows, Gardeners' World Live and others.

== History ==
Immediate Media originated from the combined assets of several formerly independent publishing houses, including BBC Magazines, Magicalia, Future plc, Hitched and Jewellery Maker.

In late 2011 the BBC's magazine-publishing business was sold to Exponent Private Equity, following clearance by the Office of Fair Trading. Exponent had previously acquired Magicalia Limited, a digital publisher and platform provider based in London. Magicalia was founded in 1999 by Adam Laird and Jeremy Tapp. Its inaugural website was bikemagic.com. In 2000, it began offering B2B publishing services, with clients such as Runner's World magazine.

In 2011 Magicalia's assets were combined with those of Origin Publishing and BBC Magazines to form Immediate Media. Tom Bureau, then-CEO of Magicalia, became the Chief Executive of the new company.

In May 2014 Immediate Media acquired Future plc's sport and craft titles. The sport portfolio included the websites Bikeradar.com and Cyclingnews.com and the magazines Cycling Plus, Procycling and Mountain Biking UK. The craft titles included Love Patchwork and Quilting, Simply Knitting, and Mollie Makes. In January 2015, Immediate Media acquired Hitched.co.uk, a UK wedding planning brand. In November 2015 Immediate Media acquired its first television property, Jewellery Maker, a TV and online commerce platform, from the Genuine Gemstone Company, adding to its Crafts and Arts portfolio. Jewellery Maker employed over 100 people at the time of its acquisition. It has since expanded into TV, video and e-commerce.

Hubert Burda Media acquired Immediate Media in 2017, for £270 million (5-6 x EBITDA).

In 2019, Immediate Media sold Procycling magazine and the Cyclingnews.com website back to Future plc.

In 2023, Immediate Media sold several of its smaller magazines to Our Publishing, founded by the former management of Origin Publishing.

== Divisions ==
=== TV and Entertainment ===
Radio Times is a British weekly television and radio programme listings magazine, founded in 1923 by John Reith, the then general manager of the BBC. It was the world's first broadcast listings magazine. The title was published entirely in-house by BBC Magazines from 1937 until 2011, when the BBC Magazines division was sold to Immediate Media. Its peak weekly circulation was 8.8 million. In 2014 it accounted for 60% of Immediate Media's profit. It is the UK's biggest-selling magazine, with a weekly print ABC of 577,087, and the UK's biggest weekly subscription title, with 271,237 subscribers in 2018.

=== Homes and Gardening ===
- BBC Gardeners' World
- The Recommended

=== Motoring ===
- BBC Top Gear

=== Parents and children ===
Immediate Media says that it has the largest market share in the UK children's magazines sector, with a total ABC-audited circulation of 780,194.

- Made For Mums

=== Specialist ===
- Easy Cook
- Good Food
- History Extra
- Olive

=== Youth and Children ===
- Andy's Amazing Adventures
- Art-Draw and Create
- Baby Shark
- BBC CBeebies
- BBC CBeebies ART
- BBC CBeebies Special
- BBC Match of the Day Magazine
- BBC Match of the Day Specials
- Bluey
- Disney's Animated Adventures
- Disney's Comic
- Disney's Explorer
- Disney Girl
- Disney Frozen
- Disney Frozen Fun Time
- Disney Stars
- Disney Princess Create and Collect
- Girl Talk
- Hatchimals
- Lego Ninjago
- Lego Disney Princesses
- Lego Superhero Legends
- Lego Star Wars
- Lego Specials
- Lego Giant Series
- Lego City
- MEGA!
- PJ Masks
- Pokémon
- Ultimate Series

== Platforms and other revenue ==
Some Immediate Media brands serve as e-commerce marketplaces. These include the wedding site hitched.co.uk and the TV shopping arm of Jewellery Maker. In July 2022, Immediate Media launched The Recommended, an internet shopping guide devoted to e-commerce recommendations and buyers' guides. Immediate Media also organises live events such as the Radio Times Festival.

Immediate Media sells market research services based around its consumer panel, which the company says has 14,000 respondents. The firm also provides data analytics, loyalty publishing and IP licensing.
