= Spasia Pandora Dinkovski =

- Born: 1986 (age 39–40); Crawley, England
- Education: Staffordshire University
- Years active: 2020–present
- Culinary career
- Cooking style: Balkan
- Current restaurant: Doma
- Previous restaurant: Mystic Burek

Spasia Pandora Dinkovski (born 1986) is an English chef, entrepreneur and author. She first gained prominence through her Mystic Burek business. She authored the cookbook Doma: Traditional Flavours and Modern Recipes from the Balkan Diaspora (2024).

== Early life ==
Dinkovski was born in Crawley, West Sussex to Macedonian parents. At age 17, she worked at a Turkish restaurant in her hometown. She studied at Staffordshire University.

== Career ==
Dinkovski started Mystic Börek as a food delivery service in July 2020, centred around the titular Balkan-style pies. As of March 2021, the business operated out of a professional kitchen. Dinkovski appeared on the 2022 Observer Food Monthly list of "[People] we love in the world of food right now".

Mystic Burek opened as a physical pie shop and café in 2023 in Sydenham, South London.Time Out London named Mystic Burek one of the best London restaurants of 2024. Dinkovski was shortlisted for 2024 CODE Hospitality Women of the Year in the Entrepreneur category.

As a writer, Dinkovski began contributing recipes to House & Garden, Olive and The Guardian. Via DK, her debut cookbook Doma: Traditional Flavours and Modern Recipes from the Balkan Diaspora was published in 2024. Marina Rabin of The Caterer named Doma one of the best cookbooks of 2024. Doma received a Diaspora accolade at the Gourmand World Cookbook Awards.

Dinkovski closed the in-person Mystic Burek shop later in 2024 and re-opened it as the restaurant Doma (working name Kafana) the following year.

== Personal life ==
As of 2025, Dinkovski has a partner, Tom, with whom she collaborates on her business.

== Bibliography ==
- Doma: Traditional Flavours and Modern Recipes from the Balkan Diaspora (2024)
