= Cyclingnews.com =

Website providing cycling news

- Screenshot of the website in November 2024
- Website type: News
- Available in: English
- Owner: Future
- Creator: Bill Mitchell
- Editor: Peter Stuart
- Website: cyclingnews.com
- Commercial: Yes
- Registration: Optional
- Launched: 1995; 31 years ago
- Current status: Active

Cyclingnews.com is a website providing coverage of cycle racing—including road, track, mountain bike, cyclocross and gravel—as well as bike-related reviews and buying advice. Since 2019, the site is owned by British publishing company Future. The site has been called "the world leader in cycling sport coverage" by industry publication Bicycle Retailer.

== History ==
In 1995 Australian Bill Mitchell, a keen cyclist and professor of economics at the University of Newcastle, created the website titled "Bill’s Cycling Racing Results and News" after finding there was a need for fast-breaking news and race results in English-speaking countries. In 1999 Sydney-based publishing company Knapp Communications purchased the website from Mitchell, and in July 2007 they sold it to British publisher Future plc for £2.2m.

In July 2014 it was bought by Immediate Media Company, with sister website BikeRadar and sister magazines Cycling Plus, Mountain Biking UK, and Procycling. In February 2019, Immediate Media sold both Cyclingnews and Procycling back to Future.

== See also ==
- List of cycling magazines
- Pedaltech-Cyclingnews-Jako
- Cycling Weekly
- VeloNews
