= Winning Bicycle Racing Illustrated =

Cycling magazine

- The first issue of Winning Bicycle Racing Illustrated (July 1983), featuring Eddy Merckx
- Publisher: Jean-Claude Garot
- Founder: Jean-Claude Garot
- Founded: 1983
- First issue: July 1983; 43 years ago
- Final issue: 1998
- Country: Belgium
- Based in: Brussels
- Language: English
- ISSN: 1051-9572

Winning Bicycle Racing Illustrated or Ciclisme International was an English- and French-language cycling magazine published in Belgium that covered European road racing. It ran from July 1983 to 1998.

== History ==
Winning Bicycle Racing Illustrated was founded by Belgian journalist and publisher Jean-Claude Garot, who had previously created the weekly newspaper Pour. Based in Brussels, Winning began as an English-language magazine first and only sold in North America, with its first issue released in July 1983. The US version of Winning was edited by Rich Carlson, a passionate cyclist devoted to covering the sport. It later made a version for Belgium and France in French, as Ciclisme International, as well as a further version in the United Kingdom. Garot sold Winning US in 1997. It soon failed, and along with Ciclisme International and Winning UK, ended in 1998.
Garot, at the same time, also published "Triathlete Magazine" with US editor Lisa Park. Among the great accomplishments of Triathlete Magazine, was the 1993 internet live streaming of the Wildflower Triathlon, orchestrated by Bill Streed, the magazine's avant-garde and progressive content director.

== See also ==
- Cycle Sport (magazine)
- Cycling Weekly
- International Cycle Sport
- VeloNews
