= Marina O'Loughlin =

British journalist, writer and restaurant critic

Marina O'Loughlin is a British journalist, writer and restaurant critic.

== Career ==
O'Loughlin was the regular weekly restaurant reviewer in the London Metro from 2006 to 2012, before moving to The Guardian, where she took over from John Lanchester. In 2017, she succeeded the late A. A. Gill as restaurant critic for The Sunday Times, remaining until the end of October 2022.

She had a monthly travel column in the BBC Olive magazine detailing her food trips to locations including Macau and Glasgow, before moving on to BBC Good Food. She has also worked on a freelance basis for The Independent and London Evening Standard newspapers and Noble Rot magazine.

== Awards and recognition ==
O'Loughlin has been awarded the Guild of Food Writers' Restaurant Reviewer of the Year twice; once in 2011 and in 2015 as well as Fortnum and Mason awards for Restaurant Writing in 2014 and 2015 and the prestigious 2015 Press Award for Criticism.

She was said to be one of the most influential Londoners in the annual Evening Standard "1,000 Most Influential People in London" supplement in 2008, 2010 and 2012. O'Loughlin has also made The Sunday Times' "Britain's 500 Most Influential" list three years running, from 2014 to 2016.

== Personal life ==
O'Loughlin is thought to have a Glaswegian accent, but now lives with her husband and two children between London and the Isle of Thanet on the Kent Coast.
