= 2017 Dubai Tour =

UCI Asia Tour

Race details
- Dates: 31 January – 4 February 2017
- Stages: 4 (Note: Reduced from 5 stages and 863 km (536 mi) due to the cancellation of the fourth stage.)
- Distance: 691 km (429.4 mi)
- Winning time: 15h 08' 56"

Results
Jersey awarded to the overall winner	Winner	Marcel Kittel (Germany)	(Quick-Step Floors)
	Second	Dylan Groenewegen (Netherlands)	(LottoNL–Jumbo)
	Third	John Degenkolb (Germany)	(Trek–Segafredo)
Jersey awarded to the points classification winner	Points	Marcel Kittel (Germany)	(Quick-Step Floors)
Jersey awarded to the youth classification winner	Youth	Dylan Groenewegen (Netherlands)	(LottoNL–Jumbo)
	Sprints	Nicola Boem (Italy)	(Bardiani–CSF)
	Team	UAE Abu Dhabi	

The 2017 Dubai Tour was a road cycling stage race that took place in Dubai between 31 January and 4 February 2017. It was the fourth edition of the Dubai Tour and was rated as a 2.HC event as part of the 2017 UCI Asia Tour.

The race was won for the second consecutive year by Germany's Marcel Kittel for the Quick-Step Floors team. Kittel won three of the four stages to be run – comfortably winning the points classification as a result – while in the other stage, Kittel was involved in a skirmish with Andriy Hrivko, which resulted in the Astana rider being ejected from the race. Kittel won the overall classification by 18 seconds ahead of LottoNL–Jumbo's Dylan Groenewegen from the Netherlands, who won the young rider classification in doing so. The final podium was completed by Kittel's compatriot John Degenkolb, a further two seconds in arrears, with the Trek–Segafredo rider winning the stage not won by Kittel. In the other race classifications, Italian rider Nicola Boem (Bardiani–CSF) won the intermediate sprints classification, while the UAE Abu Dhabi squad won the teams classification.

== Teams ==
As the Dubai Tour was a 2.HC event, a limited number of UCI WorldTeams were able to participate in the race. In total, 16 teams participated in the race: 10 UCI WorldTeams, 4 Professional Continental teams, Continental team ONE Pro Cycling, and a national selection from the United Arab Emirates.

UCI WorldTeams

- Astana
- Bahrain–Merida
- BMC Racing Team
- Team Dimension Data
- LottoNL–Jumbo
- Movistar Team
- Quick-Step Floors
- Team Sky
- Trek–Segafredo
- UAE Abu Dhabi

UCI Professional Continental Teams

- Aqua Blue Sport
- Bardiani–CSF
- Team Novo Nordisk
- Wilier Triestina–Selle Italia

UCI Continental Teams

- ONE Pro Cycling

National teams

- United Arab Emirates

== Route ==
For the 2017 Dubai Tour, the race was extended from four stages to five stages. The full itinerary was released on 13 December 2016.

The fourth stage, initially scheduled to be run over 172 km (107 mi) and to start in Dubai was initially shortened due to strong winds and sandstorms. The new stage was 109 km (68 mi) long and due to start in Hatta, whilst still finishing at the Hatta Dam. The stage was later cancelled altogether due to the winds.

Stage schedule
Stage	Date	Route	Distance	Type	Winner
1	31 January	Dubai to Palm Jumeirah	181 km (112 mi)	Flat stage	Marcel Kittel (GER)
2	1 February	Dubai to Ras al-Khaimah	186 km (116 mi)	Flat stage	Marcel Kittel (GER)
3	2 February	Dubai to Al Aqah	200 km (124 mi)	Flat stage	John Degenkolb (GER)
4	3 February	Hatta to Hatta Dam	109 km (68 mi) (Note: Stage reduced from 172 km (107 mi) due to expected strong winds and sandstorms.)	Medium-mountain stage	Stage cancelled
5	4 February	Dubai to City Walk	124 km (77 mi)	Flat stage	Marcel Kittel (GER)

== Stages ==
=== Stage 1 ===
31 January 2017 — Dubai to Palm Jumeirah, 181 km (112 mi)

Result of Stage 1
Rank	Rider	Team	Time
1	Marcel Kittel (GER)	Quick-Step Floors	4h 06' 33"
2	Dylan Groenewegen (NED)	LottoNL–Jumbo	+ 0"
3	Mark Cavendish (GBR)	Team Dimension Data	+ 0"
4	John Degenkolb (GER)	Trek–Segafredo	+ 0"
5	Sacha Modolo (ITA)	UAE Abu Dhabi	+ 0"
6	Elia Viviani (ITA)	Team Sky	+ 0"
7	Jempy Drucker (LUX)	BMC Racing Team	+ 0"
8	Simone Consonni (ITA)	UAE Abu Dhabi	+ 0"
9	Steele Von Hoff (AUS)	ONE Pro Cycling	+ 0"
10	Adam Blythe (GBR)	Aqua Blue Sport	+ 0"

General classification after Stage 1
Rank	Rider	Team	Time
1	Marcel Kittel (GER)	Quick-Step Floors	4h 06' 23"
2	Nicola Boem (ITA)	Bardiani–CSF	+ 3"
3	Dylan Groenewegen (NED)	LottoNL–Jumbo	+ 4"
4	Tom Stewart (GBR)	ONE Pro Cycling	+ 4"
5	Mark Cavendish (GBR)	Team Dimension Data	+ 6"
6	Silvan Dillier (SUI)	BMC Racing Team	+ 6"
7	John Degenkolb (GER)	Trek–Segafredo	+ 10"
8	Sacha Modolo (ITA)	UAE Abu Dhabi	+ 10"
9	Elia Viviani (ITA)	Team Sky	+ 10"
10	Jempy Drucker (LUX)	BMC Racing Team	+ 10"

=== Stage 2 ===
1 February 2017 — Dubai to Ras al-Khaimah, 188 km (117 mi)

Result of Stage 2
Rank	Rider	Team	Time
1	Marcel Kittel (GER)	Quick-Step Floors	4h 25' 33"
2	Dylan Groenewegen (NED)	LottoNL–Jumbo	+ 0"
3	Jakub Mareczko (ITA)	Wilier Triestina–Selle Italia	+ 0"
4	John Degenkolb (GER)	Trek–Segafredo	+ 0"
5	Sacha Modolo (ITA)	UAE Abu Dhabi	+ 0"
6	Juan José Lobato (ESP)	LottoNL–Jumbo	+ 0"
7	Mark Cavendish (GBR)	Team Dimension Data	+ 0"
8	Riccardo Minali (ITA)	Astana	+ 0"
9	Marco Maronese (ITA)	Bardiani–CSF	+ 0"
10	Adam Blythe (GBR)	Aqua Blue Sport	+ 0"

General classification after Stage 2
Rank	Rider	Team	Time
1	Marcel Kittel (GER)	Quick-Step Floors	8h 31' 46"
2	Dylan Groenewegen (NED)	LottoNL–Jumbo	+ 8"
3	Nicola Boem (ITA)	Bardiani–CSF	+ 13"
4	Jempy Drucker (LUX)	BMC Racing Team	+ 14"
5	Tom Stewart (GBR)	ONE Pro Cycling	+ 14"
6	Mark Cavendish (GBR)	Team Dimension Data	+ 16"
7	Jakub Mareczko (ITA)	Wilier Triestina–Selle Italia	+ 16"
8	Yousif Mirza (UAE)	UAE Abu Dhabi	+ 16"
9	Silvan Dillier (SUI)	BMC Racing Team	+ 16"
10	Peter Williams (GBR)	ONE Pro Cycling	+ 19"

=== Stage 3 ===
2 February 2017 — Dubai to Al Aqah, 200 km (124 mi)

Result of Stage 3
Rank	Rider	Team	Time
1	John Degenkolb (GER)	Trek–Segafredo	4h 03' 08"
2	Reinardt Janse van Rensburg (RSA)	Team Dimension Data	+ 0"
3	Sonny Colbrelli (ITA)	Bahrain–Merida	+ 0"
4	Juan José Lobato (ESP)	LottoNL–Jumbo	+ 0"
5	Riccardo Minali (ITA)	Astana	+ 0"
6	Jempy Drucker (LUX)	BMC Racing Team	+ 0"
7	Elia Viviani (ITA)	Team Sky	+ 0"
8	Dylan Groenewegen (NED)	LottoNL–Jumbo	+ 0"
9	Adam Blythe (GBR)	Aqua Blue Sport	+ 0"
10	Daniele Bennati (ITA)	Movistar Team	+ 0"

General classification after Stage 3
Rank	Rider	Team	Time
1	Marcel Kittel (GER)	Quick-Step Floors	12h 34' 54"
2	Dylan Groenewegen (NED)	LottoNL–Jumbo	+ 8"
3	John Degenkolb (GER)	Trek–Segafredo	+ 10"
4	Nicola Boem (ITA)	Bardiani–CSF	+ 13"
5	Jempy Drucker (LUX)	BMC Racing Team	+ 14"
6	Reinardt Janse van Rensburg (RSA)	Team Dimension Data	+ 14"
7	Alex Dowsett (GBR)	Movistar Team	+ 14"
8	Tom Stewart (GBR)	ONE Pro Cycling	+ 14"
9	Jakub Mareczko (ITA)	Wilier Triestina–Selle Italia	+ 16"
10	Mark Cavendish (GBR)	Team Dimension Data	+ 16"

=== Stage 4 ===
3 February 2017 — Hatta to Hatta Dam, 109 km (68 mi)

The stage was cancelled altogether due to strong winds.

Remained the general classification after Stage 4
Rank	Rider	Team	Time
1	Marcel Kittel (GER)	Quick-Step Floors	12h 34' 54"
2	Dylan Groenewegen (NED)	LottoNL–Jumbo	+ 8"
3	John Degenkolb (GER)	Trek–Segafredo	+ 10"
4	Nicola Boem (ITA)	Bardiani–CSF	+ 13"
5	Jempy Drucker (LUX)	BMC Racing Team	+ 14"
6	Reinardt Janse van Rensburg (RSA)	Team Dimension Data	+ 14"
7	Alex Dowsett (GBR)	Movistar Team	+ 14"
8	Tom Stewart (GBR)	ONE Pro Cycling	+ 14"
9	Jakub Mareczko (ITA)	Wilier Triestina–Selle Italia	+ 16"
10	Mark Cavendish (GBR)	Team Dimension Data	+ 16"

=== Stage 5 ===
4 February 2017 — Dubai to City Walk, 124 km (77 mi)

Result of Stage 5
Rank	Rider	Team	Time
1	Marcel Kittel (GER)	Quick-Step Floors	2h 34' 12"
2	Elia Viviani (ITA)	Team Sky	+ 0"
3	Riccardo Minali (ITA)	Astana	+ 0"
4	Mark Cavendish (GBR)	Team Dimension Data	+ 0"
5	John Degenkolb (GER)	Trek–Segafredo	+ 0"
6	Sacha Modolo (ITA)	UAE Abu Dhabi	+ 0"
7	Jempy Drucker (LUX)	BMC Racing Team	+ 0"
8	Paolo Simion (ITA)	Bardiani–CSF	+ 0"
9	Sonny Colbrelli (ITA)	Bahrain–Merida	+ 0"
10	Dylan Groenewegen (NED)	LottoNL–Jumbo	+ 0"

Final general classification
Rank	Rider	Team	Time
1	Marcel Kittel (GER)	Quick-Step Floors	15h 08' 56"
2	Dylan Groenewegen (NED)	LottoNL–Jumbo	+ 18"
3	John Degenkolb (GER)	Trek–Segafredo	+ 20"
4	Jempy Drucker (LUX)	BMC Racing Team	+ 24"
5	Elia Viviani (ITA)	Team Sky	+ 24"
6	Tom Stewart (GBR)	ONE Pro Cycling	+ 24"
7	Riccardo Minali (ITA)	Astana	+ 26"
8	Mark Cavendish (GBR)	Team Dimension Data	+ 26"
9	Reinardt Janse van Rensburg (RSA)	Team Dimension Data	+ 27"
10	Alex Dowsett (GBR)	Movistar Team	+ 27"

== Classification leadership table ==
In the 2017 Dubai Tour, four different jerseys were awarded. For the general classification, calculated by adding each cyclist's finishing times on each stage, and allowing time bonuses for the first three finishers at intermediate sprints and at the finish of mass-start stages, the leader received a blue jersey. This classification was considered the most important of the 2017 Dubai Tour, and the winner of the classification was considered the winner of the race.

Additionally, there was a points classification, which awarded a red jersey. In the points classification, cyclists received points for finishing in the top 10 in a stage. For winning a stage, a rider earned 25 points, with 16 for second, 11 for third, 8 for fourth, 6 for fifth with a point fewer per place down to a single point for 10th place. Points towards the classification could also be accrued at intermediate sprint points during each stage; these intermediate sprints also offered bonus seconds towards the general classification. There was also a sprints classification for the points awarded at the aforementioned intermediate sprints, where the leadership of which was marked by a jersey in the colours of the United Arab Emirates flag.

The fourth jersey represented the young rider classification, marked by a white jersey. This was decided in the same way as the general classification, but only riders born after 1 January 1992 were eligible to be ranked in the classification. There was also a classification for teams, in which the times of the best three cyclists per team on each stage were added together; the leading team at the end of the race was the team with the lowest total time.

Stage	Winner	General classification	Points classification	Young rider classification	Sprints classification	Team classification
1	Marcel Kittel	Marcel Kittel	Marcel Kittel	Dylan Groenewegen	Nicola Boem	UAE Abu Dhabi
2	Marcel Kittel	Marcel Kittel	Marcel Kittel	Dylan Groenewegen	Nicola Boem	UAE Abu Dhabi
3	John Degenkolb	Marcel Kittel	Marcel Kittel	Dylan Groenewegen	Nicola Boem	UAE Abu Dhabi
4	Stage cancelled	Marcel Kittel	Marcel Kittel	Dylan Groenewegen	Nicola Boem	UAE Abu Dhabi
5	Marcel Kittel	Marcel Kittel	Marcel Kittel	Dylan Groenewegen	Nicola Boem	UAE Abu Dhabi
Final		Marcel Kittel	Marcel Kittel	Dylan Groenewegen	Nicola Boem	UAE Abu Dhabi
