= International Cycle Sport =

- The April 1971 issue of International Cycle Sport, featuring Roger De Vlaeminck
- Former editors: Jock Wadley (1968–1971)
- Staff writers: John Wilcockson; René de Latour
- Frequency: Monthly
- Founder: Ron Kitching
- First issue: May 1968; 57 years ago
- Final issue Number: December 1984; 199
- Company: Kennedy Brothers Publishing
- Country: United Kingdom
- Based in: Silsden
- Language: English
- ISSN: 0020-6504
- OCLC: 924483375

International Cycle Sport was a British cycling magazine that covered British and European road racing. It had 199 issues between May 1968 and December 1984.

== History ==
International Cycle Sport was the idea of Kennedy Brothers Publishing, a printing company in Keighley, Yorkshire, owned by three brothers. With help from cycle parts importer and advertiser Ron Kitching, they brought in Jock Wadley as editor, who was head of the newly defunct Sporting Cyclist.

By 1972, the magazine was selling around the world, with a special issue for the United States that had different centre pages for local stories.

== See also ==
- Cycling Weekly
- VeloNews
- Winning Bicycle Racing Illustrated
