= Girl Talk (magazine) =

British children's magazine

- Categories: Fashion, Celebrity
- Publisher: Immediate Media Company
- Total circulation: 43,777 (First half of 2013) (June 2013)
- Founded: 1995
- Country: United Kingdom
- Language: English
- Website: www.girltalkmagazine.com

Girl Talk is a British teen magazine published by Immediate Media Company. The target audience are girls from the ages of 7 to 12.

== History and profile ==
Girl Talk was started in 1995. According to the U.K. magazine distribution website: Girl Talk is placed under the children's category and is dubbed as a magazine that has "…got all the latest gossip about your favorite celebrities, fascinating features on the things that are important to you and brilliant posters for your wall." It also states that Girl Talk distributes twenty six issues per year. The magazine is the U.K.'s oldest publication for girls in the 7-12 age group and is edited by Bea Appleby. Appleby has recently suggested that she would like the magazine to make a positive difference in the lives of girls, while still being appealing to young girls' attraction to gendered interests such as celebrity culture and beauty. In order to endorse female strength and intelligence, the magazine promotes its five messages in every issue which are as follows: • I will love myself the way I am • By working hard I know I can achieve great things • I will accept others for who they are • I will have confidence to stand up for my friends and other girls • I believe girls are equal to boys.

== 2014 rebrand ==
In 2014, Bea explained to The Telegraph that she is attempting to respond to overtly sexualized pop culture that has influenced young girls to view their sexuality and appearance as important parts of their identity. The fact that their readers had voted in a recent questionnaire that it is more important for them to feel 'pretty' as opposed to anything else including options such as 'brave' or 'clever' sparked Bea's interest in incorporating new material along with what they already promote. While she admits that magazine's such as Girl Talk include topics like celebrity gossip and beauty tips, she also attempts to take responsibility and introduce changes to encourage young girls not to limit themselves to traditionally female roles and sexist ideals. To do so, she says that although the publication will continue to provide readers with what they are used to, they will also introduce new topics that are intellectually stimulating. The changes, including interviewing a scientist, and discussing world issues such as the Taliban, will promote the idea that ... "being pretty and famous isn't everything." The magazine will also be introducing a "Girls Are Amazing" campaign for the same reasons.

== Website ==
Girl Talk has its own interactive website designed in various shades of pink and decorated with hearts, with some outlining done in bright yellow. The subheading categories include: "Home, Win, Fun, Gossip, Cringe, Games, Videos and Girl Talk Art." Girl Talk Art links to another publication under the Girl Talk category, which is marketed towards girls who are more interested in creative endeavors with an emphasis on art, rather than celebrity gossip and popular culture. There is an option for users to subscribe to an email list, which will then have them receive an email newsletter biweekly with information that will appear in the next issue. The site contains gossip about celebrities, television shows, contests, and videos from the editors and writers.
