= Jock Wadley =

English journalist

John Borland Wadley (1914 – March 1981) was an English journalist whose magazines and reporting opened Continental cycle racing to fans in Britain. Wadley covered 18 Tours de France from 1956. He worked for the British weekly, The Bicycle and then started and edited the monthlies Coureur (later Sporting Cyclist) and International Cycle Sport. He also wrote a number of books.

== Cycling origins ==
Wadley began cycling with the Colchester Rovers club when he was 14. He and a friend, Alf Kettle, were between the towns of Kelvedon and Coggeshall when they took a wrong turning into a farm track by moonlight, riding by the light of acetylene lamps. Kettle called Wadley "Willy", because it was what all new members were called. He said it was "like the Tour de France". It was the first time Wadley had heard of the race, which was still in the era of daily stages that started at dawn and rode on unsurfaced roads. He wanted to know more. He went to the world track championships in Paris when he was 19 and came home starry-eyed over riders like Jeff Scherens and Lucien Michard. He ordered the daily paper L'Auto, which organised the Tour, from a newsagent in Colchester. The man warned him it cost 1½d (1p or about 3 US cents) and that the cost was extravagant.

== Journalism ==
Wadley joined The Bicycle soon after it started, in February 1936, and became the magazine's foreign correspondent. The paper opened in opposition to Cycling, to counter Cycling's perceived establishment views, which included not covering massed racing on the open road after the Second World War and giving what some readers saw as little attention to professional cycling, such as the Tour de France. Cycling was originally dismissive of a breakaway organisation, the British League of Racing Cyclists and campaigned against it and did little to cover its races; The Bicycle saw itself as neither for or against the BLRC but saw massed-start racing an exciting part of cycle-racing. The Bicycle appeared on Tuesday rather than the Friday of its rival.

Wadley translated reports in French and Belgian papers, and cuttings sent by the magazine's correspondent at L'Auto and cycled around the Continent reporting the races he saw and writing accounts of the riders he had met. Adrian Bell, the British publisher who compiled a collection of Wadley's work, wrote:

And so began a pattern of working life and, with it, a unique style of writing about cycling that Wadley was to maintain, to a greater or lesser extent, for more than 20 years. When not required for race-reporting duties in England, he would load the panniers of his bicycle – spare clothes and maps in one, a portable typewriter in the other – and take to the roads of France, Belgium Holland. Whatever the route, it was of his choosing. And back would come the reports – of major Tours, French classics, frenetic kermesses over the Belgian pavé, or six-day dramas on the steep banking of indoor velodromes – or interviews with current riders or with those whose exploits had once made cycling history, or simply touring features that depicted the appealing variety of the terrain through which he travelled. During one two-month tour in the spring of 1954, he submitted 3,000 words a week; there was simply nothing like it in the English cycling press.

Wadley left the magazine two years later and joined the press department of the bicycle maker, Hercules, which was sponsoring prominent British riders to break long-distance records. From there he was conscripted into the services at the start of the Second World War.

With the return of peace, he became one of three press officers for the sport's governing body, the Union Cycliste Internationale when the Olympic Games were held in London in 1948. He then rejoined The Bicycle and stayed until it closed in 1955. That year he started work on a monthly magazine, initially called Coureur but then, because a magazine with a similar title already existed, Sporting Cyclist.

=== Sporting Cyclist ===
Wadley recalled of his redundancy: "I saw more cycling... than in four far-from-dull years on The Bicycle. As the programme included my first all-the-way Tour de France, I had enough material in hand to write a book... The dream, however, was to bring out a continental-style all-cycling magazine."

In late 1956, Wadley secured the backing of the publisher Charles Buchan, former football captain of Arsenal and England, who wanted a companion to his magazine, Football Monthly. Wadley told Buchan that he had a proposal which would never make him rich but wouldn't disgrace him, an approach so novel that Buchan was interested from the start. Issue number one was written by Wadley, who had also taken most of the photographs. It was produced at the home of Peter Bryan, Wadley's editor at The Bicycle, with help from a photographer, Bill Lovelace, and a designer, Glenn Steward. They too had worked at The Bicycle.

Sporting Cyclist introduced Continental racing through the Franco-American writer, René de Latour. His role was "friend of the stars", providing insights into Continental racing at a time when Cycling concentrated on domestic issues.

The cycle parts importer and advertiser, Ron Kitching, wrote:

This was a real innovation and an instant success. It was filled with exciting stories of both home and overseas events, written not only by Jock himself but also by the top cycling writers of the day – like René de Latour, Harry Aspden, Charles Ruys and Dick Snowden, Geoffrey Nicholson and David Saunders.

The last edition was in April 1968, volume 12, number 4. Sporting Cyclist was by then owned by Longacre Press, which had bought Buchan's publications. Longacre also published Cycling and the two merged. The assistant editor, Roy Green, who had joined in 1960, left Sporting Cyclist to join Amateur Photographer.

Wadley set up another magazine, International Cycle Sport, which after 199 issues in 17 years also failed, by which time Wadley's contract as editor had long since not been renewed.

=== International Cycle Sport ===
International Cycle Sport was the idea of Kennedy Brothers, a printing company in Keighley, Yorkshire owned by three brothers. It was the first English-language cycling magazine printed in colour, with a colour cover and several colour pages inside. The contents were those which would have appeared in the next Sporting Cyclist. Wadley's assistant editor, John Wilcockson, said: "We were thrilled with the first issue that came off the presses, even though the colour reproduction was pretty awful." One of the pictures, of the Belgian rider Patrick Sercu was printed the wrong way round.

Wadley wrote in his first leading article:

I had launched [Sporting Cyclist] because I knew the cycling world wanted it. There was never any suggestion that it would make a lot of money for anybody. Yet within a few years, after a series of mergers and takeovers, Sporting Cyclist found itself under the control of a giant publishing organisation whose business, understandably, was to make money. A small monthly magazine supported by what it considered to be a "dying industry" was obviously of little interest to such a concern, and its eventual merger with Cycling was simply a matter of time. When the decision was taken I and my most able assistant Roy Green were given the chance of carrying on with the combined publication, but neither accepted the offer.

The magazine was produced in a basement office in Kingston upon Thames Surrey, rented from Maurice Cumberworth, race director of the Milk Race. Kennedy Brothers, however, failed and a receiver passed its assets to another Yorkshire printer, Peter Fretwell. The magazine was among the assets. Fretwell's company was also struggling and the receiver hoped to make one strong company out of two weak ones.

Wilcockson said:

Peter Fretwell was a tough-minded businessman, the antithesis of the mild-mannered Wadley. The two men didn't get on... The arrangement worked for a while, but Fretwell soon decided that he could do without Wadley. I was prepared to go too, but my 'father' [Wadley] said no... Well, within a year, I was fired too.

Adrian Bell wrote:

So the saying goes, you can never walk the same road twice. ICS was not Sporting Cyclist in full-colour guise. In the first place it never had the same breadth of coverage. Secondly, not only was it more narrowly focused, it contained fewer articles, and they were mainly written by professional journalists. In its text and the use of full-page colour photography, it was closer to a contemporary monthly cycling journal; it was never a diary written by clubmen for clubmen.

=== Tour de France ===
Jock Wadley covered 18 Tours de France not only for his magazine but for the London Daily Telegraph. The paper then decided to send its specialist cycling reporter, David Saunders. Until then Saunders had not wanted to spend a month of each summer away from home.

The new arrangement ended Wadley's newspaper career and halted the occasional contributions he made to BBC Radio, where he reported on noisy short-wave and telephone links from races such as the world championship and Bordeaux–Paris, a race from which he reported the victory of the British rider, Tom Simpson.

It also ended Wadley's habit of following the Tour in the car of French journalist colleagues and he covered his 19th Tour by bike and wrote a book called My Nineteenth Tour de France.

His years at the Tour de France earned him the race's medal. He received it from the organisers Jacques Goddet and Félix Lévitan at Carpentras in 1970. For many years he had been the only permanent English-speaking reporter on the Tour and the race press officer, Louis Lapeyre, who for many years refused to speak to any anglophone journalists let alone do it in English, finally negotiated with them through Wadley.

=== Tom Simpson ===
Few cyclists featured in Wadley's writing as much as Tom Simpson, the first Briton to wear the yellow jersey in the Tour de France. Wadley's first encounter with him was in 1955 while he was at a training camp in Monaco sponsored by the derailleur-maker, Simplex. The camp was run by the former Tour rider, Charles Pélissier. Wadley went there to report, specifically on a promising Irish rider called Seamus Elliott, who had won his place as a prize in the previous year's Tour of Ireland.

Many cyclists unable to attend the camp wrote to Pélissier, asking his advice. Wadley translated them into French for him. One said:

Dear Sir, I am writing to you hoping you will give me some advice on racing and training for the 1955 season. I am 16 years old, and have raced on the track and also massed start road races, competing in between, in time trials. In my first track event I gained 3rd place, in road races I have won 2 prizes and in time trials I have won 4 prizes. My positions in time trials were 11th, 8th, 15th, 7th. I have done 25 miles in 1hr 34 seconds, which is the fastest time for a 16-year-old in England this year.

I would like to know, if you think it is advisable to compete in so many different events, and also what greatest mileage I should race. I have been told that if I race often, I will burn myself out, and will be no good when I get older, do you think this is true. Yours in sport, Thomas Simpson, HARWORTH & DIST. C.C.

There is no evidence of a reply from Pélissier, who didn't speak English, although Wadley suggested in Sporting Cyclist in 1965 that he may have done.

=== Writing style ===
Martin Ayres, one of several who wrote their first articles for Sporting Cyclist and went on to edit cycling magazines of their own, said that Wadley's discursive, first-person style looked simple but "I tried to copy Jock's style once or twice when I was editor of Cycling, but when I did it, it just seemed like name-dropping.'

Adrian Bell wrote:

This consistent use of the first person in his articles is crucial to understanding the appeal of his writing. Regardless of whether he was composing an account of a race, interviewing an old-time, retired cyclist, or describing a leisurely tour, he always used this technique. Events were not reported as if they were simple objective facts, nor were they sensationalised; always we saw them through his eyes and ears. He offered us his thoughts, his emotions and his immediate impressions at the moment of their happening, and if those impressions needed to be revised in the light of later revelations, he did that, too, and explained why... Good letter-writers, so they say, are basically good conversationalists and, by all accounts, J. B. Wadley was certainly that.

== Long-distance riding ==
Wadley always rode in Hush Puppy shoes, which he said hurt his feet less than conventional cycling shoes. He rode long distances both in races such as 24-hour time-trials – he rode just short of 400 miles in the North Road event when he was 59 – and outside competition. His first book, My 19th Tour de France, starts: "I had practised and thoroughly enjoyed what I had for so long been preaching. Instead of lazing 3,000 miles in a press car, I had pedalled 1,750 on a bike. Instead of scribbling 400 words a night and phoning them through to Fleet Street, I have taken my time in writing 90,000 and sent them to the printers."

His fondness for France led him to join the Union Sportif at Créteil, in the Paris suburbs. That led to his riding the 1,200 km challenge, Paris–Brest–Paris, which he recorded in another book, Old Roads and New. His writing inspired riders around the world. In Britain it led to the creation of Audax UK to provide a means for British riders to take part. In Canada said the long-distance enthusiast Eric Fergusson:

Here in British Columbia, "Brestward Ho!" [title of the chapter recounting Paris–Brest–Paris] did indeed make its mark. After reading the story, local cycling legend John Hathaway committed to ride the Audax version of PBP in 1976. While in France, he met the randonneur PBP organiser Robert Lepertel and was persuaded to come back for the next randonneur PBP in 1979. Three years later Hathaway returned to France with fellow randonneur pioneers Dan McGuire, Gerry Pareja, and Wayne Phillips to participate in (and complete!) PBP '79 marking the birth of randonneur cycling in British Columbia, and indeed, in Canada.

There was a celebration marking the 25th anniversary of BC Randonneurs at the club's annual general meeting in September 2003. At this event Gerry Pareja... held up a copy of Old Roads and New. With the "Brestward Ho!" chapter in mind Gerry suggested that: 'This book probably had more to do with getting English-speaking cyclists to become interested in PBP than anything else written about it.'

Wadley rode the Brevet des Randonneurs des Alpes, a mountain challenge, in 1973. It was run as a time-trial over the col de Glandon, the Croix de Fer, the Telegraphe and the Galibier. The race started in Grenoble at 2 am. Wadley had hoped to meet Pierre Brambilla, who lost the Tour de France on the last day in 1947. He was attacked, against a tradition that the race leader would be left to ride to Paris in glory, by the Frenchman Jean Robic. Wadley had met Brambilla but never remembered to ask the truth of the story that he was so upset by his defeat that he buried his bike in his garden.

Graeme Fife wrote:

"Brambilla caught Wadley on the approach to the Galibier. Wadley thought the Italian veteran (now 53 years old) would have been miles ahead, but he'd overslept and set out an hour late. He offered to give Wadley a tow up the Galibier; Wadley declined and Brambilla flew off. Wadley remembered the buried bicycle story and called out, but too late... the chance to confirm or scotch missed."

== Death ==
Wadley remained disillusioned at the closure of Sporting Cyclist – "the only time I saw him angry", said Peter Bryan – and at being fired from International Cycle Sport and at the mixed success of his book-publishing venture. He died in March 1981 and his ashes were scattered on the col du Glandon in the Alps. His widow, Mary, had asked that his ashes be scattered on the route of the Tour.

They were taken by a group of readers led by the British enthusiast, Neville Chanin. They scattered them on Bastille Day during the Tour de France. Chanin wrote:

We dined well that night [before the scattering of ashes] but then we usually do. This meal was a special one: our table was laid for eight, yet fellow diners noted only seven lads present. They watched in silence as we drank a toast to the unoccupied chair at the head of our table... It seemed logical and fitting that Jock should attend his final Tour with a bunch of British clubmen... We – the seven of us – had each taken a turn in carrying the remains of our Sporting Cyclist over the mountain roads he knew so well and now Chris would carry him up the Glandon – two hours of real climbing.

I'd chosen a special spot on the Glandon because, in 1973 on his 59th birthday, Jock had climbed that pass while riding the Brevet Randonneur des Alpes. Dave was first to the summit and had descended the 13km to locate the spot in the Défilé de Maupas where the Torrent des Sept Laux comes crashing down from seven lakes higher up the mountain, forming a spectacular waterfall. He had already gathered a selection of mountain flowers and arranged them in a plastic bottle and was making a simple cross as I arrived... Our intentions had been announced on Radio Tour and the organisers had positioned a gendarme nearby to ensure that our scattering of his ashes was not interrupted. It was sad and silent.

Peter Bryan said: "Wadley's beautiful turn of phrase could be applied equally to a touring theme or race report, and he carried you, the reader, along with him as though you were riding and hearing his words borne from the front saddle."

Ron Kitching said:

He wasn't ruthless enough to be a businessman, he just floated through life absorbing the cycling scene and reflecting it in his articles and books. I don't think Jock ever worked as such, he just put down in words what his thoughts were. Jock was a real gentleman but he did tend to wander off. We were sponsoring the Tour of the North and International Cycle Sport was one of the sponsors. He turned up on his bike, just pottering about. He seemed more interested in riding his bike than covering the race. Which was his downfall, really.

An annual road race is held near Colchester each summer in Wadley's memory. Wadley had been president of the Colchester Rovers. A collection of his writing was published in 2002: From the pen of J. B. Wadley, ed: Adrian Bell, Mousehold Press, Norwich.
