= Nicola Boem =

Italian cyclist

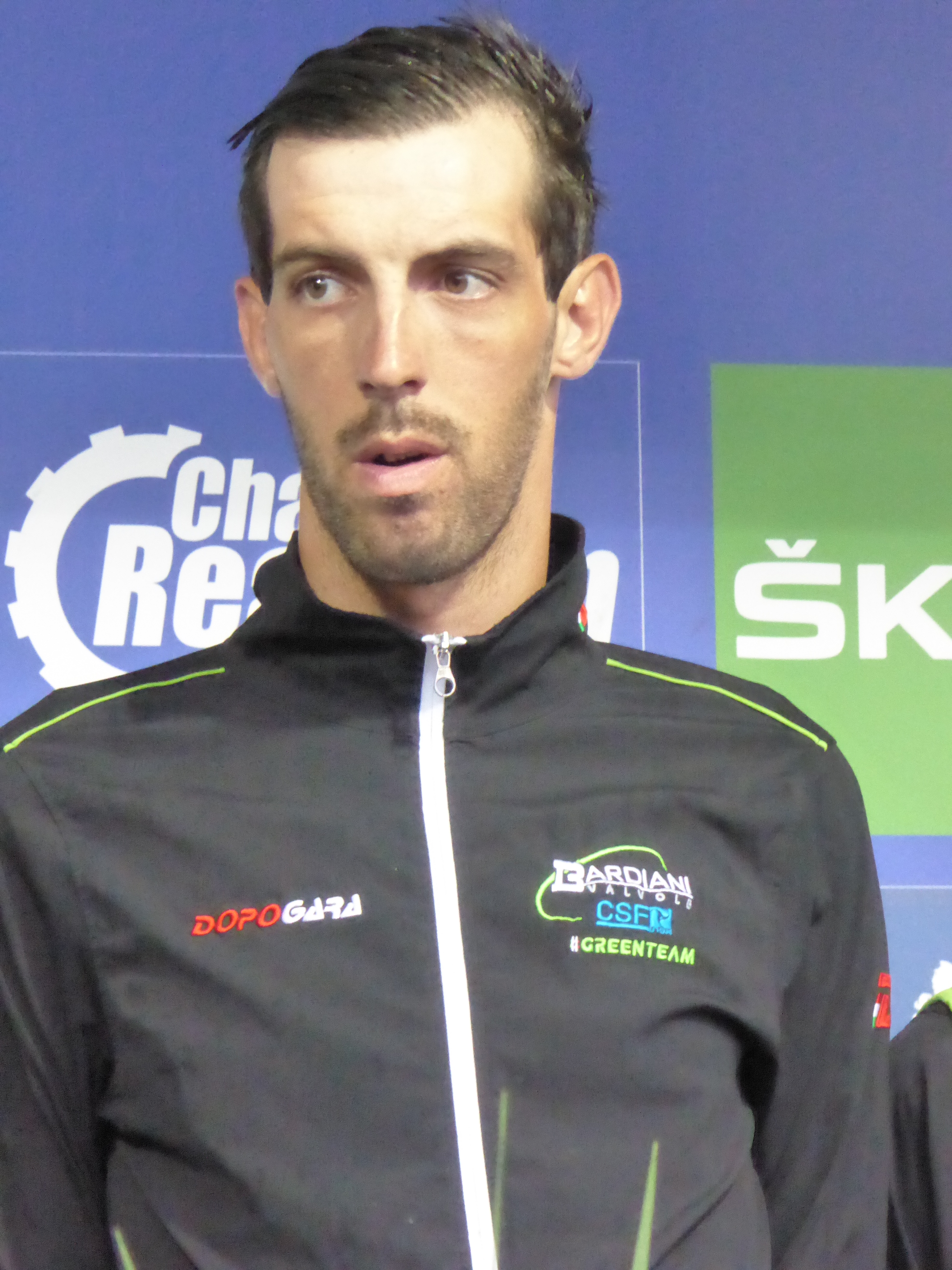
- Boem at the 2016 Tour of Britain

Personal information
- Full name: Nicola Boem
- Born: 27 September 1989 (age 37) San Donà di Piave, Italy
- Height: 187 cm (6 ft 2 in)
- Weight: 75 kg (165 lb)

Cycling career
- Sport: Cycling
- Current team: Retired
- Discipline: Road
- Role: Rider
- Rider type: Rouleur

Amateur teams
- 2008: U.C. Basso Piave
- 2009: Marchiol–Pasta Montegrappa–Site–Heraclia
- 2010: Reale Mutua–ORT
- 2010–2012: Zalf–Désirée–Fior
- 2012: Colnago–CSF Bardiani (stagiaire)

Professional team
- 2013–2017: Bardiani Valvole–CSF Inox

Major wins
- Grand Tours Giro d'Italia 1 individual stage (2015)

Nicola Boem (born 27 September 1989) is an Italian former racing cyclist, who competed professionally between 2013 and 2017, all for the Bardiani–CSF team.

He competed in the Giro d'Italia five times, winning Stage 10 of the 2015 Giro d'Italia in solo fashion after attacking his breakaway companions.

== Major results ==
2007
2nd Time trial, National Junior Road Championships
2009
2nd Giro del Belvedere
5th Coppa San Geo
2010
1st Stage 6 Giro della Valle d'Aosta
3rd Trofeo Franco Balestra
8th Giro del Belvedere
2011
1st Giro del Belvedere
2nd Trofeo Franco Balestra
3rd Overall Giro del Veneto e delle Dolomiti
5th Overall Coupe des nations Ville Saguenay
6th Trofeo Edil C
2012
2nd Coppa San Geo
2nd Trofeo Edil C
2014
1st Stage 6 Danmark Rundt
2015
Giro d'Italia

1st Stage 10
Held after Stages 10–12

2017
1st Sprints classification Dubai Tour

=== Grand Tour general classification results timeline ===
Grand Tour	2013	2014	2015	2016	2017
Giro d'Italia	137	128	159	139	152
Tour de France	Did not contest during career				
Vuelta a España	Did not contest during career				

Legend
—	Did not compete
DNF	Did not finish
