= René de Latour =

American journalist

René de Latour (born New York, United States, 30 September 1906, died Quiberon, France, 4 September 1986) was a Franco-American sports journalist, race director of the Tour de l'Avenir cycle race, and correspondent of the British magazine, Sporting Cyclist, to which he contributed to 120 of the 131 issues.

== Background ==
René de Latour was born in 42nd Street, New York. His father was French, born in Lyon, and his mother Belgian, from Verviers. The family returned to France at the start of World War I, when de Latour was eight. He never lost a slight American accent when he spoke English.

The war was an exciting time for a young boy and de Latour made the most of that and his freedom. In 1917 he met American soldiers in Paris and became their interpreter and guide. He took them to the Folies Bergère when he was 11. His American links gave him an interest in baseball but it was cycling that filled his life.

== Cycling ==
The venue for cycle-racing in the centre of Paris was the Vélodrome d'Hiver, an indoor track close to the Eiffel Tower. There he met the Canadian star, Willie Spencer, becoming not just interpreter and guide but his odd-job boy, or runner, during races. He boasted that that was the last time he ever paid to enter the velodrome.

De Latour shared a bike with his brother until he was 15. The next year he saved for his own and then joined the Club Sportif de Montrouge, in southern Paris. He became a modest racer but nothing better. At 20, French law gave him the opportunity to decide his nationality. He could be American through his birth in the USA or French through his father. He chose to be French and spent 18 months in the army.

He returned to the Vel' d'Hiv' on leaving national service and again looked after Americans, including the motor-paced champion, Charlie Jaeger. That brought him a job with Reggie McNamara during six-day races and eventually as trainer, or at any rate advisor, to Hubert Opperman in the Tour de France.

It was in the Vel' d'Hiv, according to a report in The Bicycle that "Latour, cycling reporter" was held with other cycling officials and journalists as a suspected collaborator during the German occupation of France between 1940 and 1944.

== Journalism ==
René de Latour's byline first appeared in Paris-Soir in 1932. He was recruited by the chief cycling writer, Gaston Benac. He helped Benac find the route for the first Grand Prix des Nations.

He moved to L'Équipe, for which he not only wrote but directed the Tour de l'Avenir for 10 years. He said the highlight of his career was being taken for dinner by Fausto Coppi and hearing from him of his dispute and rivalry with Gino Bartali.

== Personality ==
Jock Wadley, who recruited de Latour for Sporting Cyclist and took him to International Cycle Sport after Sporting Cyclist 's closure, described de Latour as "an undemonstrative man who may appear sullen. His humour is dry and, to an Englishman, rather stern;"

The British journalist Ron White once asked de Latour what happened to the British riders in the Tour de l'Avenir. De Latour answered, without looking up: "I don't know - I wasn't that far back."

De Latour often travelled by scooter, usually a Vespa. He paced Fausto Coppi during his warm-up for the world hour record at the Vigorelli track in Milan. De Latour was the last editor of Vespa Journal while he was still working at L'Équipe

He wrote a novel, Le Mort mène le Peloton (death leads the race) in 1951 and, in English, World Champions I Have Known

== Retirement and death ==
De Latour retired at the start of the 1980s to a cottage with a library in Quiberon. He had a stroke and developed dementia. He died aged 79.
