= Good Food (brand) =

Global food media brand

- Cover of the December 2024 issue
- Editor: Lily Barclay
- Categories: Food
- Frequency: Monthly
- Total circulation: 211,221 (June 2016)
- Company: Immediate Media
- Country: United Kingdom
- Language: English
- Website: bbcgoodfood.com

Good Food, known as BBC Good Food until 2024, is a global food media brand established in 1989, with a monthly magazine, website, app, live events and series of books.

Keith Kendrick is Head of Magazines along with Dr. Keith Rowley, with Christine Hayes as BBC Good Food's first brand editorial director. Natalie Hardwick is the editor of bbcgoodfood.com.

In November 2014, the BBC Good Food brand celebrated its 25th anniversary with a new logo, designed by international branding agency Lambie-Nairn.

BBC Good Food magazine was awarded Food and Drink Magazine of the year at the DMA 2013 Digital Magazine Awards and Digital Magazine of the Year at the PPA Digital Publishing Awards 2013.

In 2018, rights to the brand were acquired from BBC Studios by Immediate Media. In 2024, the continued use of the BBC name ended and the brand was renamed Good Food starting with April 2024 issue.
