= VeloNews =

American cycling magazine

- The 25th anniversary issue of VeloNews, March 17, 1997
- Editor-in-chief: Fred Dreier
- Former editors: John Wilcockson
- Categories: Sport magazine
- Frequency: Weekly
- Circulation: 70,000
- Founder: Barbara and Robert George
- Founded: 1972
- First issue: March 1972
- Company: Outside
- Country: United States
- Based in: Boulder, Colorado
- Language: English
- Website: velonews.com
- ISSN: 0161-1798

VeloNews was an American cycling magazine headquartered in Boulder, Colorado dedicated to the sport of cycling. After 50 years of leading cycling journalism in the United States, VeloNews was purchased by Outside Inc. in early 2021. Months later, another major U.S. road cycling publication, Cycling Tips, was acquired in July 2021. Soon after acquisition, however, CEO Robin Thurston refocused Outside Inc's business model, stating in April 2022 that "Outside's future is in NFTs." The NFT marketplace crashed within six months. In a letter to staff on November 15, announcing layoffs, Thurston stated that "The fundamentals of our business are sound," but "economic headwinds that every media and technology business is facing have only intensified." On June 1, 2023, VeloNews.com quietly closed as the URL stopped directing to the dedicated VeloNews homepage.

== History ==
The magazine was first published as Northeast Cycling News in March 1972 by Barbara and Robert George.

== See also ==
- Cyclingnews.com
- Cycle Sport (magazine)
- Cycling Weekly
- International Cycle Sport
- Winning Bicycle Racing Illustrated
