= Cycling Active =

British cycling magazine

Cycle Active
- Editor: Robert Garbutt
- Categories: Cycling
- Frequency: 13 times a year
- Circulation: 23,152 (ABC Jan – Dec 2013)
- Publisher: TI Media
- Founded: 2009
- First issue: September 2009
- Final issue: September 2016
- Country: United Kingdom
- Language: English
- Website: Cycle Active

Cycle Active was a cycling magazine published 13 times a year by TI Media. The magazine was in circulation between September 2009 and September 2016.

== History and profile ==
Cycle Active was first published in September 2009. It was restarted in October 2015. It was first edited by Robert Garbutt and then, by Hannah Reynolds. The magazine ended publication in September 2016. The magazine and Cycle Sport were incorporated into Cycling Weekly, which is also published by the same company.
