= L'Industrie Vélocipédique =

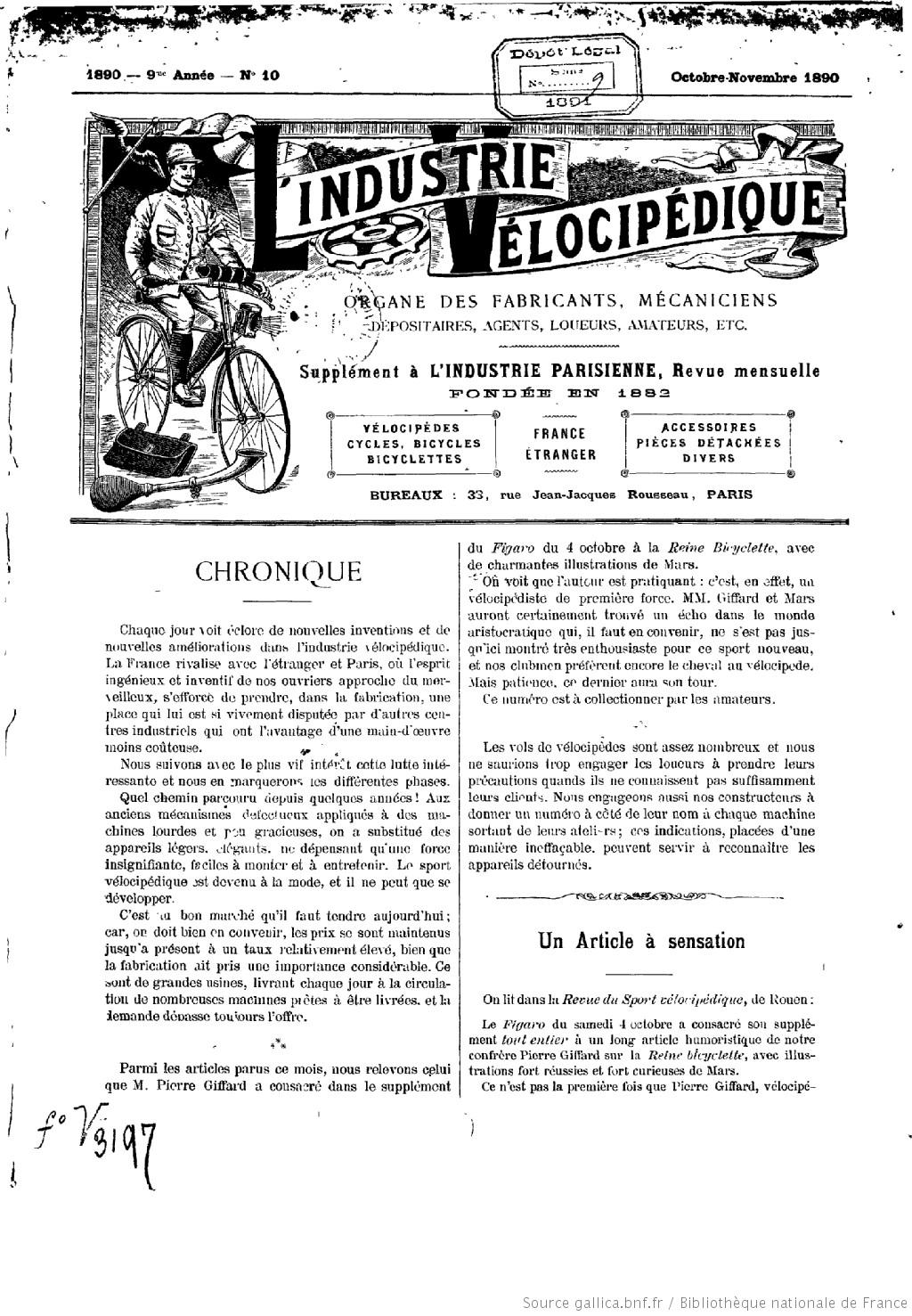
L'Industrie Vélocipédique 1890

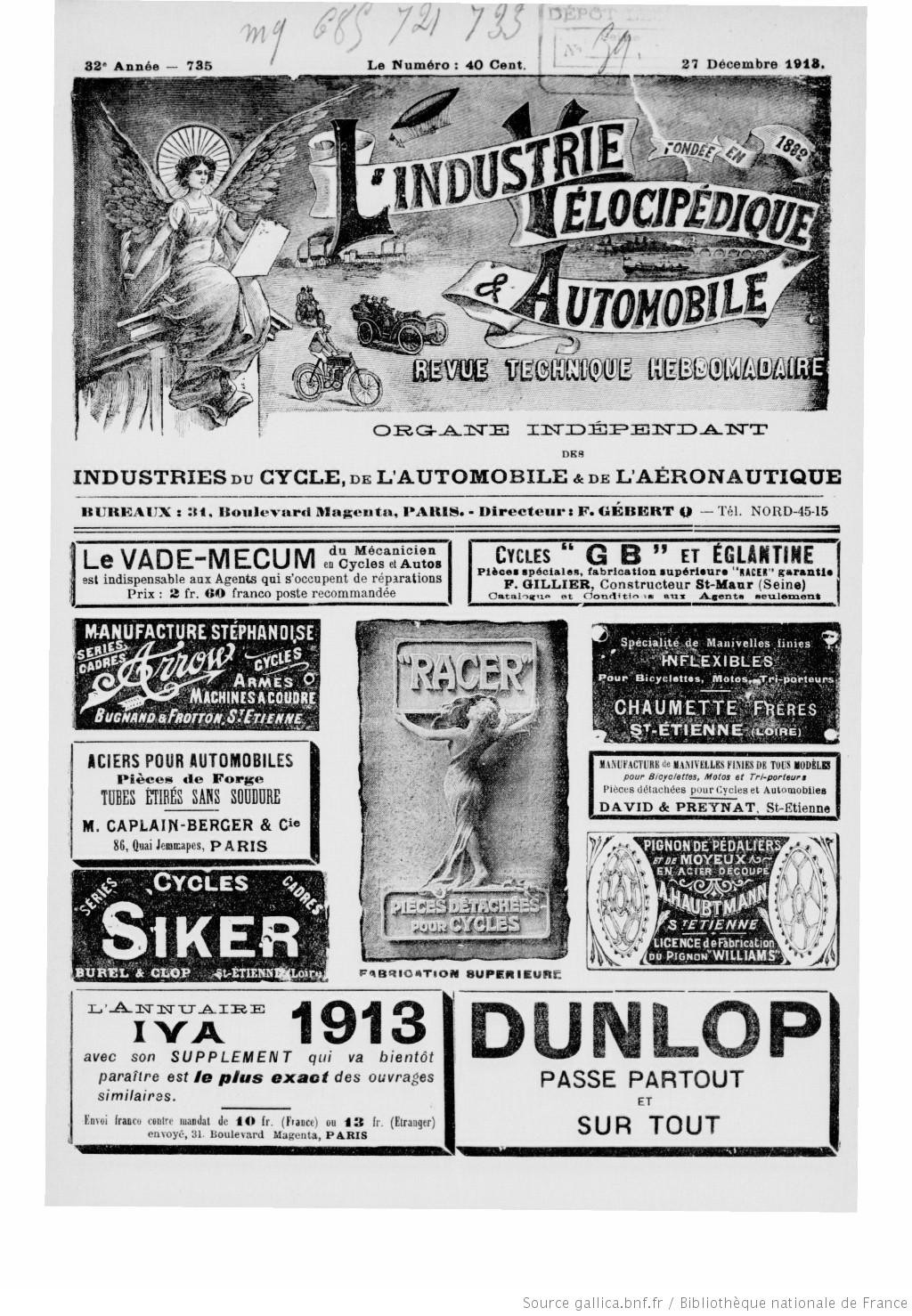
L'Industrie Vélocipédique et Automobile 1913

L'Industrie Vélocipédique (Bicycle Industry) was a French periodical that was published bi-monthly from 1882. It covered cycling (velocipeding) and described itself as "the organ of manufacturers, mechanics, depositors, agents, renters, amateurs, etc". It was published from offices at 33 rue Jean Jacques Rousseau, Paris.

By 1910 it had changed its name to L'Industrie Vélocipédique et Automobile.

The last recorded publication was 27 December 1913 by which time the title had evolved to L'Industrie Vélocipédique et Automobile, Revue technique Hebdomadaire (Fortnightly), the Independent organ of the Cycle, Automobile and Aeronautical industries.

== Cycling Publication market ==
By 1903 the French market for cycling publications was large, energetic and crowded. Thus L'Industrie Vélocipédique had to compete with La Revue des Sport; La Revue du Sport Vélocipédique; Le Veloce-Sport; Le Cycle; Le Monde Cycliste; La France Cycliste; Les Sportes Athletiques; Le Cycliste; Le Bulletin Officiel de l'Union Velocipedique de France; Le Cycliste Belge; Le Cyclisme; La Bicyclette; L'Écho des Sports de Paris; the daily cycling newspaper Le Velo and L'Auto-Vélo.

== National Library of France – Gallica ==
All copies of L'Industrie Vélocipédique are stored at the National Library of France – Gallica. They can be freely accessed online at Gallica, Online Archive, L'Industrie Vélocipédique Index
