= Velo Vision =

Quarterly magazine on bicycles

Cover of VeloVision Issue 21, showing the kind of unusual content featured in the magazine

VeloVision was a quarterly magazine that covered specialised bicycles, utility cycling and human power worldwide since 2000 and was originally published and edited by Peter Eland. The format is 230mm x 280mm (slightly over A4). The headquarters of the magazine was in York.

In 2015, Eland retired from publishing the magazine and sold it to a former reader, Howard Yeomans. VeloVision covered utility and delivery bikes, commuting, folding bikes, tandems, special needs cycling, recumbents. The magazine closed in December 2016.

A last effort was tried with a number 53 in March 2018, by Simon Webb, using crowdfunding.

A French website now uses a similar name, in 2024.
