= Sporting Cyclist =

Magazine published in the United Kingdom

- The September 1967 issue of Sporting Cyclist, featuring the death of Tom Simpson
- Categories: Sport magazine
- Frequency: Monthly
- Founder: Jock Wadley
- Founded: 1955; 70 years ago
- First issue: Winter 1955
- Final issue Number: April 1968; 131
- Company: Charles Buchan's Publications; Longacre Press
- Country: United Kingdom
- Language: English

Sporting Cyclist was a British cycling A4-sized magazine originally called Coureur. It began in 1955 and ended after 131 issues in April 1968.

== History ==
=== Coureur ===
Coureur - the magazine for the sporting cyclist was the idea of the journalist, Jock Wadley. John Borland Wadley joined the weekly magazine, The Bicycle, soon after it started in February 1936. The publication opened as opposition to the established weekly, Cycling, to counter Cycling's perceived establishment views, which included not covering massed racing on the open road after the Second World War and giving what some readers saw as little attention to professional cycling, such as the Tour de France, on the Continent. Cycling was originally dismissive of a breakaway organisation, the British League of Racing Cyclists (BLRC) and frequently campaigned against it and did little to cover its races; The Bicycle, on the other hand, saw itself as neither for or against the BLRC but saw the massed-start racing on the road for which it stood as a normal and even exciting part of cycle-racing. That was also the view of Jock Wadley, who used his enthusiasm for road racing and for France to report from the Continent whenever he could.

In 1955, The Bicycle closed and was absorbed by Cycling, which did not take on its staff. Wadley recalled of the months following his redundancy: "I saw more cycling... than in four far-from-dull years on The Bicycle. As the programme included my first all-the-way Tour de France, I had enough material in hand to write a book... The dream, however, was to bring out a continental-style all-cycling magazine."

Money for the new magazine, called Coureur, came from a London cycling enthusiast and timber-dealer called Vic Jenner. Jenner was an enthusiast for all forms of cycling and once offered to pay the Tour de France winner, Jacques Anquetil to race against the clock in a time-trial in Essex. Jenner died, however, before the contract could be organised. He did, though, see the appearance of the first issue of Coureur in autumn 1955.

Issue number one was written entirely by Wadley, who had also taken most of the photographs. It was produced at the home of Peter Bryan, until recently editor of The Bicycle, with help from a photographer, Bill Lovelace, and a designer, Glenn Steward. They too had worked at The Bicycle. The title was the last thing to be decided, chosen by Steward from a list of suggestions from Wadley. The first issue had no advertising, the second had six pages and the fourth more than 12.

The first issue was sold for two shillings and sixpence at the British Best All-Rounder 1955 prizegiving at Royal Alber Hall London. Among those who bought a copy was the editor of Cycling, H. H. "Harry" England. Three further issues were published in 1956: spring, summer and autumn.

=== Sporting Cyclist ===
In late 1956, Wadley secured the backing of the publisher Charles Buchan, former football captain of Arsenal and England, who wanted a companion to his magazine, Football Monthly. Wadley told Buchan that he had a proposal which would never make him rich but wouldn't disgrace him, an approach so novel that Buchan was interested from the start. Under Buchan, the magazine changed name to Sporting Cyclist because there was already a magazine called Courier, which was too similar a name. The newsagent chain, W.H. Smith, had declined to sell the magazine because of the similarity.

Sporting Cyclist, which was always written largely by Wadley, introduced Continental racing to British readers, especially through the contributions of the Franco-American writer, René de Latour, who became race director of the Tour de l'Avenir and worked as a cycling journalist in Paris, where he had moved with his parents when he was young. His role was as the magazine's "friend of the stars", providing insights into Continental racing at a time when Cycling concentrated its reporting on domestic issues. Sporting Cyclist celebrated each Tour de France by printing its cover on yellow paper. It carried pictures from Wadley, from news agencies and from the assistant editor, Roy Green, who joined the magazine in 1960. The art editor was Glenn Steward.

The first Sporting Cyclist was published in May 1957 and it went on to sell 11,000 or more copies a month, with the exception of the Tour de France issue in September which sold more.

The cycle parts importer and advertiser, Ron Kitching, wrote:

This was a real innovation and an instant success. It was filled with exciting stories of both home and overseas events, written not only by Jock himself but also by the top cycling writers of the day - like René de Latour, Harry Aspden, Charles Ruys and Dick Snowden, Geoffrey Nicholson and David Saunders.

=== Closure ===
The last edition was in April 1968, volume 12, number 4. Wadley had already left and the final issue was edited by Green. His leader said:

This is a critical time for cycling and, consequently, for cycling magazines. The post-war bubble of enthusiasm for the sport and pastime burst many years ago; club memberships shrank, the industry shrivelled and other publications collapsed through lack of support.

Sporting Cyclist was by then owned by Longacre Press, which had bought Buchan's publications. Longacre also published Cycling and the two publications merged. "This new 'tandem' will be known as Cycling and Sporting Cyclist", said the leader, "and will bring the best of all home and foreign journalism within one set of covers every week." Wadley wasn't convinced and set up another magazine, International Cycle Sport, which after 199 issues in 17 years also failed, by which time Wadley's contract as editor had long since not been renewed. Roy Green left Sporting Cyclist to join Amateur Photographer.

Wadley wrote in his first leading article in International Cycle Sport

I had launched [Sporting Cyclist] because I knew the cycling world wanted it. There was never any suggestion that it would make a lot of money for anybody. Yet within a few years, after a series of mergers and takeovers, Sporting Cyclist found itself under the control of a giant publishing organisation whose business, understandably, was to make money. A small monthly magazine supported by what it considered to be a "dying industry" was obviously of little interest to such a concern, and its eventual merger with Cycling was simply a matter of time. When the decision was taken I and my most able assistant Roy Green were given the chance of carrying on with the combined publication, but neither accepted the offer.

Sporting Cyclist ran as the centre pages of Cycling for some years before being dropped.

== Legacy ==
Sporting Cyclist's legacy was that it established a demand for news of Continental racing, and insights from the Tour de France and interviews with star riders, that could no longer be denied. Cycling had in any case moved in that direction under the editorship of Alan Gayfer, who was editing the magazine when Sporting Cyclist was merged with it.

There are now several monthly cycling magazines in Britain, of which Procycling and Cycle Sport are spiritual successors of Sporting Cyclist.

=== Wadley's death ===
J. B. Wadley died in March 1981 and his ashes were scattered on the col du Glandon in the Alps, which he had ridden on his 59th birthday in 1973. Peter Bryan, who had been Wadley's editor at The Bicycle and an associate at Sporting Cyclist, said: "Wadley's beautiful turn of phrase could be applied equally to a touring theme or race report, and he carried you, the reader, along with him as though you were riding and hearing his words borne from the front saddle."

Kitching said: "He wasn't ruthless enough to be a businessman, he just floated through life absorbing the cycling scene and reflecting it in his articles and books. Which was his downfall, really."

A collection of Wadley's writing, including Sporting Cyclist was published in 2002: From the pen of J. B. Wadley, ed: Adrian Bell, Mousehold Press, Norwich.
