= Cycle Sport (magazine) =

British cycling magazine

- The final issue of Cycle Sport (September 2016), featuring Mark Cavendish
- Editor: Robert Garbutt
- Categories: Cycling
- Frequency: 13 issues a year
- Circulation: 19,614 (ABC Jan – Dec 2013); Print and digital editions.
- Publisher: IPC Media
- First issue: June 1993; 31 years ago
- Final issue: September 2016
- Country: United Kingdom
- Language: English
- ISSN: 0161-3553

Cycle Sport was a cycling magazine published 13 times a year by IPC Media. The magazine was first published in June 1993. It was edited by Robert Garbutt. In July 2016, it was announced that the magazine was to closed down, with the final issue being September 2016. The magazine and Cycling Active were incorporated into Cycling Weekly, which is also published by the same company.
