= Olive (food magazine) =

British food magazine

- Cover of the October 2024 issue
- Categories: Food magazine
- Frequency: Monthly
- Total circulation: 60,725 (June 2013)
- Founded: 2003
- Company: Immediate Media Co.
- Country: United Kingdom
- Language: English
- Website: olivemagazine.com

Olive is a print magazine launched in 2003 and is a premium, monthly British food magazine featuring triple-tested recipes, restaurant recommendations, and food-focused travel.
