= Cycling Plus =

British cycling magazine

- Cover of the June 2024 issue
- Editor: Rob Spedding
- Frequency: 13 issues a year
- Circulation: 44,000
- Founded: 1992
- Company: Our Media
- Country: UK
- Based in: Bristol
- Language: English

CyclingPlus is a road cycling sport magazine owned by Our Media. First published in 1992, there are 13 issues a year. The magazine contains product reviews and reports on rides around the UK, and is reminiscent of Bicycling magazine of the 1970s in the USA. It is (as of 2017) edited by Rob Spedding with the majority of the readers being in their mid forties, and has a circulation of 44,000.

The magazine was acquired by Immediate Media from Future plc in 2014. Our Media acquired several magazines, including Cycling Plus, from Immediate Media in 2023.
