= 2015 Nippo–Vini Fantini season =

Nippo–Vini Fantini
- 2015 season
- UCI code: VFN
- Status: UCI Professional Continental
- Manager: Hiroshi Daimon
- Main sponsor(s): Farnese vini & Nippo
- Based: Italy
- Bicycles: De Rosa
- Groupset: Campagnolo

Season victories
- One-day races: -
- Stage race overall: 2
- Stage race stages: 9

The 2015 season for the Nippo–Vini Fantini cycling team began in January at the Tour de San Luis. The team participated in UCI Continental Circuits and UCI World Tour events when given a wildcard invitation.

== 2015 roster ==
Rider	Date of birth
Giacomo Berlato (ITA)	5 May 1992 (aged 22)
Alessandro Bisolti (ITA)	7 March 1985 (aged 29)
Didier Chaparro (COL)	7 July 1987 (aged 27)
Daniele Colli (ITA)	19 April 1982 (aged 32)
Damiano Cunego (ITA)	19 September 1981 (aged 33)
Pierpaolo De Negri (ITA)	5 June 1986 (aged 28)
Iuri Filosi (ITA)	17 January 1992 (aged 22)
Eduard-Michael Grosu (ROU)	4 September 1992 (aged 22)
Manabu Ishibashi (JPN)	30 November 1992 (aged 22)

Rider	Date of birth
Shiki Kuroeda (JPN)	8 January 1992 (aged 22)
Alessandro Malaguti (ITA)	22 September 1987 (aged 27)
Nicolas Marini (ITA)	29 July 1993 (aged 21)
Antonio Nibali (ITA)	23 September 1992 (aged 22)
Emanuele Onesti (Note: Onesti joined the team on 1 August as a stagiaire, from Aran Cucine.) (ITA)	21 June 1995 (aged 19)
Mattia Pozzo (ITA)	26 January 1989 (aged 25)
Riccardo Stacchiotti (ITA)	8 November 1991 (aged 23)
Antonio Viola (ITA)	21 September 1990 (aged 24)
Genki Yamamoto (JPN)	19 November 1991 (aged 23)

Riders who joined the team for the 2015 season

Rider	2014 team
Giacomo Berlato	neo-pro (Zalf-Euromobil)
Alessandro Bisolti	neo-pro (Vini Fantini–Nippo)
Didier Chaparro	ex-pro (Colombia–Coldeportes, 2013)
Daniele Colli	Neri Sottoli
Damiano Cunego	Lampre–Merida
Pierpaolo De Negri	Vini Fantini–Nippo
Iuri Filosi	neo-pro (Team Colpack)
Eduard Michael Grosu	neo-pro (Vini Fantini–Nippo)
Manabu Ishibashi	neo-pro (Vini Fantini–Nippo)
Shiki Kuroeda	neo-pro (Vini Fantini–Nippo)
Alessandro Malaguti	Vini Fantini–Nippo
Nicolas Marini	neo-pro (Zalf-Euromobil)
Antonio Nibali	neo-pro (Marchiol-Emisfero)
Mattia Pozzo	Neri Sottoli
Riccardo Stacchiotti	neo-pro (Vini Fantini–Nippo)
Antonio Viola	neo-pro (Vini Fantini–Nippo)
Genki Yamamoto	neo-pro (Vini Fantini–Nippo)

== Season victories ==
Date	Race	Competition	Rider	Country	Location
20 May	Tour of Japan, Stage 3	UCI Asia Tour	Nicolas Marini (ITA)	Japan	Mino
31 May	Giro d'Italia, Fair Play classification	UCI World Tour	(Note: The riders on the squad were Damiano Cunego, Giacomo Berlato, Alessandro Bisolti, Daniele Colli, Pierpaolo De Negri, Eduard-Michael Grosu, Manabu Ishibashi, Alessandro Malaguti and Riccardo Stacchiotti)	Italy	
19 June	Tour of Slovenia, Stage 2	UCI Europe Tour	Pierpaolo De Negri (ITA)	Slovenia	Kočevje
11 September	Tour de Hokkaido, Stage 1	UCI Asia Tour	Riccardo Stacchiotti (ITA)	Japan	Asahikawa
12 September	Tour de Hokkaido, Stage 2	UCI Asia Tour	Daniele Colli (ITA)	Japan	Biei
13 September	Tour de Hokkaido, Stage 3	UCI Asia Tour	Riccardo Stacchiotti (ITA)	Japan	Sapporo
13 September	Tour de Hokkaido, Overall	UCI Asia Tour	Riccardo Stacchiotti (ITA)	Japan	
13 September	Tour de Hokkaido, Points classification	UCI Asia Tour	Daniele Colli (ITA)	Japan	
13 September	Tour de Hokkaido, Teams classification	UCI Asia Tour	(Note: The riders on the squad were Riccardo Stacchiotti, Iuri Filosi, Daniele Colli, Genki Yamamoto and Giacomo Berlato)	Japan	
6 October	Tour of China I, Stage 4	UCI Asia Tour	Daniele Colli (ITA)	China	Wuhan
9 October	Tour of China I, Overall	UCI Asia Tour	Daniele Colli (ITA)	China	
13 October	Tour of China II, Stage 2	UCI Asia Tour	Nicolas Marini (ITA)	China	Shaoyang Langshan
14 October	Tour of China II, Stage 3	UCI Asia Tour	Nicolas Marini (ITA)	China	Shaoshan
18 October	Tour of China II, Stage 6	UCI Asia Tour	Nicolas Marini (ITA)	China	Zhuhai
