= 2016 Nippo–Vini Fantini season =

Nippo–Vini Fantini
- 2016 season
- UCI code: NIP
- Status: UCI Professional Continental
- Manager: Hiroshi Daimon
- Main sponsor(s): Farnese vini & Nippo
- Based: Italy
- Bicycles: De Rosa
- Groupset: Campagnolo

Season victories
- One-day races: 1
- Stage race overall: 1
- Stage race stages: 5

The 2016 season for the Nippo–Vini Fantini cycling team began in January at the Tour de San Luis. The team participated in UCI Continental Circuits and UCI World Tour events when given a wildcard invitation.

== 2016 roster ==
Rider	Date of birth
Nicola Bagioli (Note: Bagioli joined the team on 1 August as a stagiaire, from Zalf Euromobil Désirée Fior.) (ITA)	19 February 1995 (aged 20)
Giacomo Berlato (ITA)	5 May 1992 (aged 23)
Alessandro Bisolti (ITA)	7 March 1985 (aged 30)
Grega Bole (SLO)	13 August 1985 (aged 30)
Daniele Colli (ITA)	19 April 1982 (aged 33)
Damiano Cunego (ITA)	19 September 1981 (aged 34)
Pierpaolo De Negri (ITA)	5 June 1986 (aged 29)
Iuri Filosi (ITA)	17 January 1992 (aged 23)
David Gaona Vázquez (Note: Gaona Vázquez joined the team on 1 August as a stagiaire, from Hermanos Carranza.) (MEX)	2 March 1997 (aged 18)
Eduard-Michael Grosu (ROU)	4 September 1992 (aged 23)

Rider	Date of birth
Manabu Ishibashi (JPN)	30 November 1992 (aged 23)
Yūma Koishi (JPN)	15 September 1993 (aged 22)
Kazushige Kuboki (JPN)	6 June 1989 (aged 26)
Nicolas Marini (ITA)	29 July 1993 (aged 22)
Antonio Nibali (ITA)	23 September 1992 (aged 23)
Riccardo Stacchiotti (ITA)	8 November 1991 (aged 24)
Antonio Viola (ITA)	21 September 1990 (aged 25)
Genki Yamamoto (JPN)	19 November 1991 (aged 24)
Gianfranco Zilioli (ITA)	5 March 1990 (aged 25)

Riders who joined the team for the 2016 season

Rider	2015 team
Yūma Koishi	CCT p/b Champion System
Grega Bole	CCC–Sprandi–Polkowice
Kazushige Kuboki	Team Ukyo
Gianfranco Zilioli	Androni Giocattoli–Sidermec

Riders who left the team during or after the 2015 season

Rider	2016 team
Alessandro Malaguti	Unieuro–Wilier
Shiki Kuroeda	Aisan Racing Team
Mattia Pozzo	Retired
Didier Chaparro	

== Season victories ==
Date	Race	Competition	Rider	Country	Location
7 February	Gran Premio della Costa Etruschi	UCI Europe Tour	Grega Bole (SLO)	Italy	Tuscany
5 June	Tour of Japan, Points classification	UCI Asia Tour	Pierpaolo De Negri (ITA)	Japan	
12 June	Tour de Korea, Overall	UCI Asia Tour	Grega Bole (SLO)	South Korea	
24 July	Tour of Qinghai Lake, Stage 8	UCI Asia Tour	Nicolas Marini (ITA)	China	Linxia
30 July	Tour of Qinghai Lake, Points classification	UCI Asia Tour	Daniele Colli (ITA)	China	
2 September	Tour de Hokkaido, Stage 3	UCI Asia Tour	Pierpaolo De Negri (ITA)	Japan	Kutchan
3 September	Tour de Hokkaido, Points classification	UCI Asia Tour	Pierpaolo De Negri (ITA)	Japan	
14 September	Tour of China I, Stage 5	UCI Asia Tour	Nicolas Marini (ITA)	China	Leshan
9 November	Tour of Taihu Lake, Stage 4	UCI Asia Tour	Nicolas Marini (ITA)	China	Wujiang
10 November	Tour of Taihu Lake, Stage 5	UCI Asia Tour	Eduard-Michael Grosu (ROU)	China	Haimen
