= 2015 Giro d'Italia, Stage 12 to Stage 21 =

Stages 12 to 21 of an Italian multi-day road cycling race

The 2015 Giro d'Italia began on 9 May, and stage 12 occurred on 21 May.

Legend
A pink jersey	Denotes the leader of the general classification	A blue jersey	Denotes the leader of the mountains classification
A red jersey	Denotes the leader of the points classification	A white jersey	Denotes the leader of the young rider classification

== Stage 12 ==
21 May 2015 — Imola to Vicenza (Monte Berico), 190 km (118.1 mi)

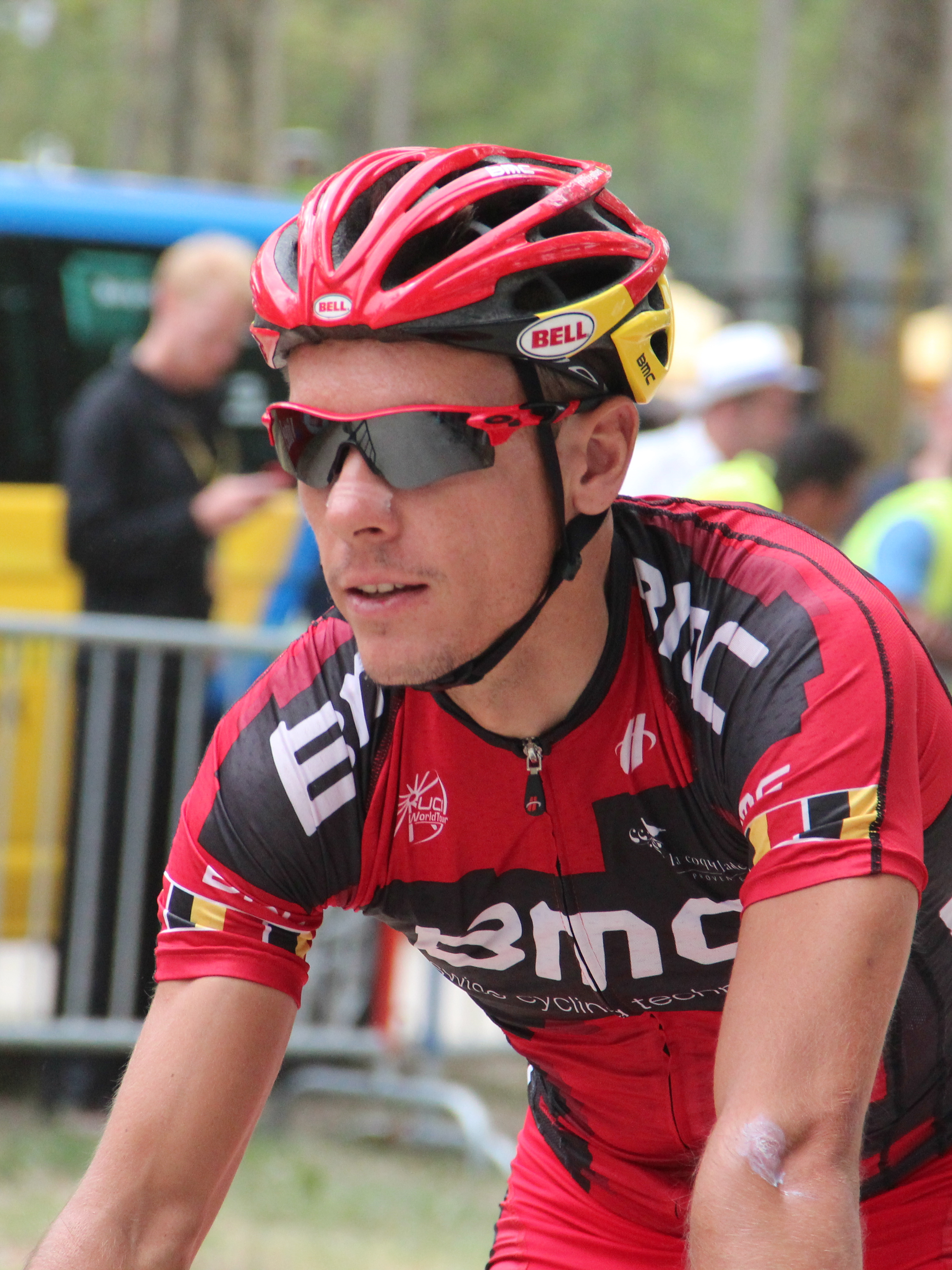
Philippe Gilbert won Stage 12, which had the characteristics of a Classic in the finale

The 12th stage of the Giro featured another chance for the Classics specialists to take a stage victory. The first 129 kilometres (80 miles) of the stage was entirely flat before the riders tackled three categorised climbs on the route - the fourth category Castelnuovo, the third category Crosara and the fourth category Monte Berico. Along with the three climbs, the uncategorised climb of Perarolo was also located on the route. The ascent of Monte Berico started at around 1 kilometre (0.62 miles) from the finish, averaging 7.1% and going all the way to the finish. The short climb provided a chance for the general classification contenders to make some differences in the overall standings.

For the first 70 kilometres (43 miles), no rider could break away from the peloton as the riders' pace was at around 50 kilometres per hour (31 mph) during that stretch. Finally, 5 riders, consisting of AG2R La Mondiale's Patrick Gretsch, Androni Giocattoli–Sidermec's Davide Appollonio, Bardiani–CSF's Enrico Barbin, FDJ's Kenny Elissonde and LottoNL–Jumbo's Nick van der Lijke, were able to build a gap on the peloton. However, they were not allowed to build a big lead as the peloton only allowed them to have an advantage of around 2 minutes. The peloton began to reel them in one by one with around 50 kilometres (31 miles) still remaining with Gretsch being the last rider reeled in by the peloton. Afterwards, Gianfranco Zilioli of Androni Giocattoli–Sidermec attacked but Louis Vervaeke of Lotto–Soudal joined and dropped him but he was not able to build much of a gap and soon, he was also caught. As the riders approached the summit of Crosara, Beñat Intxausti also attacked but his only focus was maintaining the blue jersey. Maglia rosa wearer, Alberto Contador, also gave in a little dig to put him in the right place on the descent.

On the descent, several riders crashed including Simon Gerrans, dropping him out of contention for the stage win. At the front, Alexandre Geniez attacked but his descending style got him off-road and he was also caught. The peloton also split on the descent but they eventually regrouped into a smaller peloton. With around 16 kilometres (9.9 miles) to go, Franco Pellizotti of Androni Giocattoli–Sidermec attacked and although he tried to go solo, Astana's Tanel Kangert chased and joined him. The duo were able to build a gap of nearly 30 seconds as the riders closed in on the ascent of Monte Berico. In the final kilometre, Kangert was able to distance Pellizotti but Kangert was also caught with around 200 metres (660 feet) left. After a while, Philippe Gilbert attacked and no one was able to catch him as he took his second Giro stage win. From behind, the peloton split into three groups with Contador taking second place and the 6 bonus seconds, 3 seconds behind Gilbert. With Fabio Aru finishing 8 seconds in arrears of Contador and coupled with the time bonuses he gained, Contador stayed in pink and extended his general classification lead over Aru to 17 seconds.

Stage 12 result

	Rider	Team	Time
1	Philippe Gilbert (BEL)	BMC Racing Team	4h 22' 50"
2	Alberto Contador (ESP)	Tinkoff–Saxo	+ 3"
3	Diego Ulissi (ITA)	Lampre–Merida	+ 3"
4	Simon Geschke (GER)	Team Giant–Alpecin	+ 3"
5	Enrico Battaglin (ITA)	Bardiani–CSF	+ 3"
6	Paolo Tiralongo (ITA)	Astana	+ 3"
7	Ion Izagirre (ESP)	Movistar Team	+ 6"
8	Carlos Betancur (COL)	AG2R La Mondiale	+ 6"
9	Jurgen Van den Broeck (BEL)	Lotto–Soudal	+ 6"
10	Mikel Landa (ESP)	Astana	+ 6"

General classification after Stage 12

	Rider	Team	Time
1	Alberto Contador (ESP)	Tinkoff–Saxo	51h 17' 06"
2	Fabio Aru (ITA)	Astana	+ 17"
3	Mikel Landa (ESP)	Astana	+ 55"
4	Dario Cataldo (ITA)	Astana	+ 1' 30"
5	Roman Kreuziger (CZE)	Tinkoff–Saxo	+ 1' 55"
6	Rigoberto Urán (COL)	Etixx–Quick-Step	+ 2' 19"
7	Giovanni Visconti (ITA)	Movistar Team	+ 2' 21"
8	Damiano Caruso (ITA)	BMC Racing Team	+ 2' 29"
9	Andrey Amador (CRC)	Movistar Team	+ 2' 38"
10	Leopold König (CZE)	Team Sky	+ 2' 44"

== Stage 13 ==
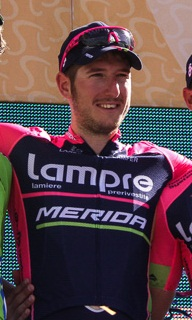
Sacha Modolo said it was his destiny to win in Jesolo, in his home region

22 May 2015 — Montecchio Maggiore to Jesolo, 147 km (91.3 mi)

After two stages partially designed for Classics specialists, the riders tackled an entirely flat course designed for pure sprinters. No climbs were included on the route and no uphill roads were included on the stage. The final 20 kilometres (12 miles) could have introduced winds that sparked echelons in the peloton and rain could have also been a factor on the stage, especially on the expected bunch sprint in the finale.

Unlike the previous stage when a break was not allowed to go away easily, a break was already established early, consisting of BMC Racing Team's Rick Zabel, IAM Cycling's Jérôme Pineau and Androni Giocattoli–Sidermec's Marco Frapporti. The break was not allowed to build a large gap, however, as the peloton only allowed them to have an advantage of around two and a half minutes before chasing them. At one point during the stage, the break was stopped by a crossing train and as a result, the peloton also slowed down to allow the break to build a gap again. However, the advantage of the breakaway went down from two minutes to just around one minute. Frapporti won the first intermediate sprint while Zabel won the second intermediate sprint. However, the peloton was quickly closing in on the three breakaway riders.

With the chase being led by the sprinters' teams, the gap was down to around 30 seconds with around 25 kilometres (16 miles) left and with 20 kilometres (12 miles) left, the lead of the trio was down to 14 seconds. The trio would eventually be caught 17.5 kilometres (10.9 miles) from the finish. After all riders regrouped, Tinkoff–Saxo led the peloton for around 10 kilometres (6.2 miles) before Trek Factory Racing took over with 6 kilometres (3.7 miles) to go, trying to set up their sprinter, Giacomo Nizzolo. However, with 3.2 kilometres (2.0 miles) left, a crash took down most of the riders. Among those caught in the crash were general classification contenders, Alberto Contador and Richie Porte. As the crash took place just outside the 3-kilometre (1.9-mile) banner, time lost would stand. Meanwhile, up front, Lampre–Merida took over the peloton as the riders were closing in on the finish. Lampre–Merida perfectly led out their sprinter, Sacha Modolo, as Modolo took the stage win ahead of Nizzolo and Elia Viviani. Main general classification contenders, Fabio Aru and Rigoberto Urán, both of whom were able to escape the crash, finished four seconds behind Modolo; Contador finished 36 seconds behind Aru, while Porte lost two minutes on the day. As a result of the crash, Aru took over the maglia rosa ahead of the individual time trial, with a 19-second advantage over Contador. It was the first time in his career that Contador lost a leader's jersey in a Grand Tour after wearing the jersey previously during the race.

Stage 13 result

	Rider	Team	Time
1	Sacha Modolo (ITA)	Lampre–Merida	3h 03' 08"
2	Giacomo Nizzolo (ITA)	Trek Factory Racing	+ 0"
3	Elia Viviani (ITA)	Team Sky	+ 0"
4	Alexander Porsev (RUS)	Team Katusha	+ 0"
5	Eduard-Michael Grosu (ROU)	Nippo–Vini Fantini	+ 0"
6	Maximiliano Richeze (ARG)	Lampre–Merida	+ 0"
7	Moreno Hofland (NED)	LottoNL–Jumbo	+ 0"
8	Nicola Ruffoni (ITA)	Bardiani–CSF	+ 0"
9	Luka Mezgec (SLO)	Team Giant–Alpecin	+ 0"
10	Heinrich Haussler (AUS)	IAM Cycling	+ 0"

General classification after Stage 13

	Rider	Team	Time
1	Fabio Aru (ITA)	Astana	54h 20' 35"
2	Alberto Contador (ESP)	Tinkoff–Saxo	+ 19"
3	Mikel Landa (ESP)	Astana	+ 1' 14"
4	Roman Kreuziger (CZE)	Tinkoff–Saxo	+ 1' 38"
5	Dario Cataldo (ITA)	Astana	+ 1' 49"
6	Rigoberto Urán (COL)	Etixx–Quick-Step	+ 2' 02"
7	Damiano Caruso (ITA)	BMC Racing Team	+ 2' 12"
8	Andrey Amador (CRC)	Movistar Team	+ 2' 21"
9	Giovanni Visconti (ITA)	Movistar Team	+ 2' 40"
10	Yuri Trofimov (RUS)	Team Katusha	+ 3' 15"

== Stage 14 ==
23 May 2015 — Treviso to Valdobbiadene, 59.4 km (36.9 mi), individual time trial (ITT)

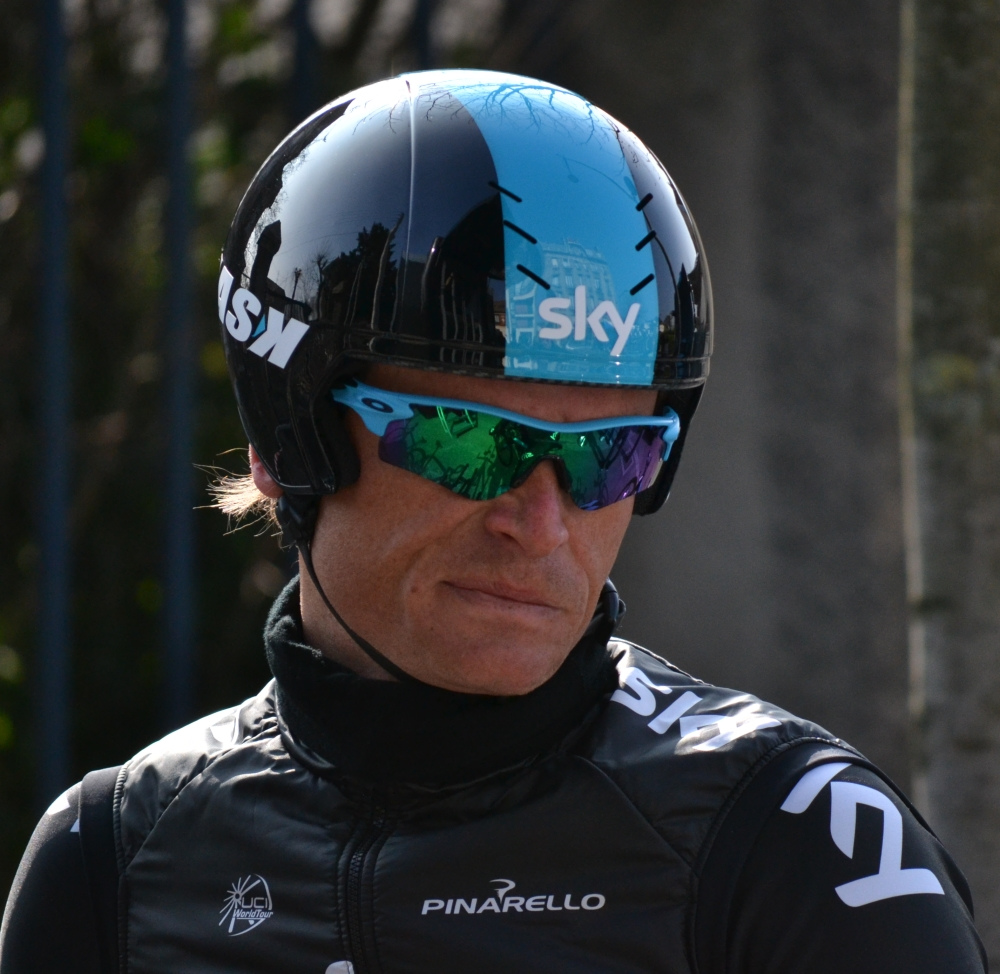
Vasil Kiryienka won the time trial by 12 seconds, ahead of Luis León Sánchez

Featuring the only individual time trial of this year's Giro, the stage was the longest individual time trial since 2009 when Denis Menchov won Stage 12, a 60.6-kilometre (37.7-mile) test, on his way to overall victory. The riders travelled from Treviso to Valdobbiadene, the home of prosecco and tiramisu. The first 30 kilometres (19 miles) of the stage was flat while the rest of the stage was hilly, including the fourth category climb of San Pietro Di Feletto in the middle of the stage. After the climb, a short descent followed before the riders went up a hill again. Another short descent followed before a short 400-metre (1,300-foot) climb to the finish. The stage was considered as the most crucial of the Giro and was expected to build huge time gaps between the riders. Following tradition, the riders set off in reverse order of the general classification, starting from the last-placed rider to the leader of the standings. Thus, Marco Coledan of Trek Factory Racing, who was 3h 15' 15" behind maglia rosa wearer Fabio Aru at the start of the day, was the first rider off the start ramp.

However, Coledan was not the first rider to cross the finish line as Michael Hepburn, the third rider off the start ramp, set a time of 1h 21' 05" to set the early time to beat. Shortly after, Nikolay Mihaylov beat Hepburn's times at the intermediate time checks before setting the best time at the finish of 1h 20' 32", 33 seconds faster than Hepburn's time. Christopher Juul-Jensen and Alexander Porsev went close to beating Mihaylov's time but they both fell short at the finish. After a while, Luke Durbridge took Mihaylov out of the hot seat, setting a time of 1h 19' 28", bettering Mihaylov's time by more than a minute. Time trial specialist, Kristof Vandewalle went close to beating Durbridge's time but Vandewalle came back from a crash and fell short by 5 seconds. However, both Vasil Kiryienka and Patrick Gretsch went faster than Durbridge's time. Gretsch set a time of 1h 18' 15" to knock Durbridge off the hot seat but Kiryienka immediately beat Gretsch with a time of 1h 17' 52", 23 seconds better than Gretsch. Kiryienka's time would not be beaten as he took his third Giro stage win.

The focus would eventually shift to the general classification favourites. Change in weather and wind direction played a factor in the stage result and it made it hard for the late starters to set faster times than the early starters. Riders like Jurgen Van den Broeck, Andrey Amador and Leopold König set good times that were enough to move them up the standings. Soon, the four main overall contenders, Richie Porte, Rigoberto Urán, Alberto Contador and Aru went off the start ramp. Porte was the first to set off and although he was expected to set a good time, he struggled as he only finished with a time of 1h 22' 12" in 55th place, 4' 20" behind Kiryienka. Urán, who was a favourite for the stage victory, struggled as well and he could not repeat his performance in the previous year's stage 12 time trial. He could only set a time of 1h 20' 37", 2' 45" behind in 23rd place. After some time, Contador went off the start ramp and despite the effects of his injury and his tweaked time trial position, he set the fastest time of all the general classification favourites. Despite being 1' 05" off Kiryienka's pace at the first intermediate time check, Contador put significant time gaps into his main rivals, even catching his three-minute man, Mikel Landa, on the course as he eventually recorded a time of 1h 18' 06", the third best time and just 14 seconds behind Kiryienka's time. Aru did his best to limit his losses but he could only finish with a time of 1h 20' 53", 3' 01" behind Kiryienka and more importantly, 2' 47" behind Contador. As a result of the huge time gaps, Urán rose to fourth place in the overall standings, 4' 14" behind, while Porte suffered as he dropped to 17th place in the general classification, 8' 52" in arrears. More importantly, Contador retook the maglia rosa by 2' 28" over Aru in second with Amador in third at 3' 36" behind.

Stage 14 result

	Rider	Team	Time
1	Vasil Kiryienka (BLR)	Team Sky	1h 17' 52"
2	Luis León Sánchez (ESP)	Astana	+ 12"
3	Alberto Contador (ESP)	Tinkoff–Saxo	+ 14"
4	Patrick Gretsch (GER)	AG2R La Mondiale	+ 23"
5	Steven Kruijswijk (NED)	LottoNL–Jumbo	+ 1' 09"
6	Tanel Kangert (EST)	Astana	+ 1' 17"
7	Jurgen Van den Broeck (BEL)	Lotto–Soudal	+ 1' 25"
8	Fabio Felline (ITA)	Trek Factory Racing	+ 1' 26"
9	Tobias Ludvigsson (SWE)	Team Giant–Alpecin	+ 1' 27"
10	Luke Durbridge (AUS)	Orica–GreenEDGE	+ 1' 36"

General classification after Stage 14

	Rider	Team	Time
1	Alberto Contador (ESP)	Tinkoff–Saxo	55h 39' 00"
2	Fabio Aru (ITA)	Astana	+ 2' 28"
3	Andrey Amador (CRC)	Movistar Team	+ 3' 36"
4	Rigoberto Urán (COL)	Etixx–Quick-Step	+ 4' 14"
5	Jurgen Van den Broeck (BEL)	Lotto–Soudal	+ 4' 17"
6	Dario Cataldo (ITA)	Astana	+ 4' 50"
7	Mikel Landa (ESP)	Astana	+ 4' 55"
8	Damiano Caruso (ITA)	BMC Racing Team	+ 4' 56"
9	Roman Kreuziger (CZE)	Tinkoff–Saxo	+ 4' 57"
10	Leopold König (CZE)	Team Sky	+ 5' 35"

== Stage 15 ==
24 May 2015 — Marostica to Madonna di Campiglio, 165 km (102.5 mi)

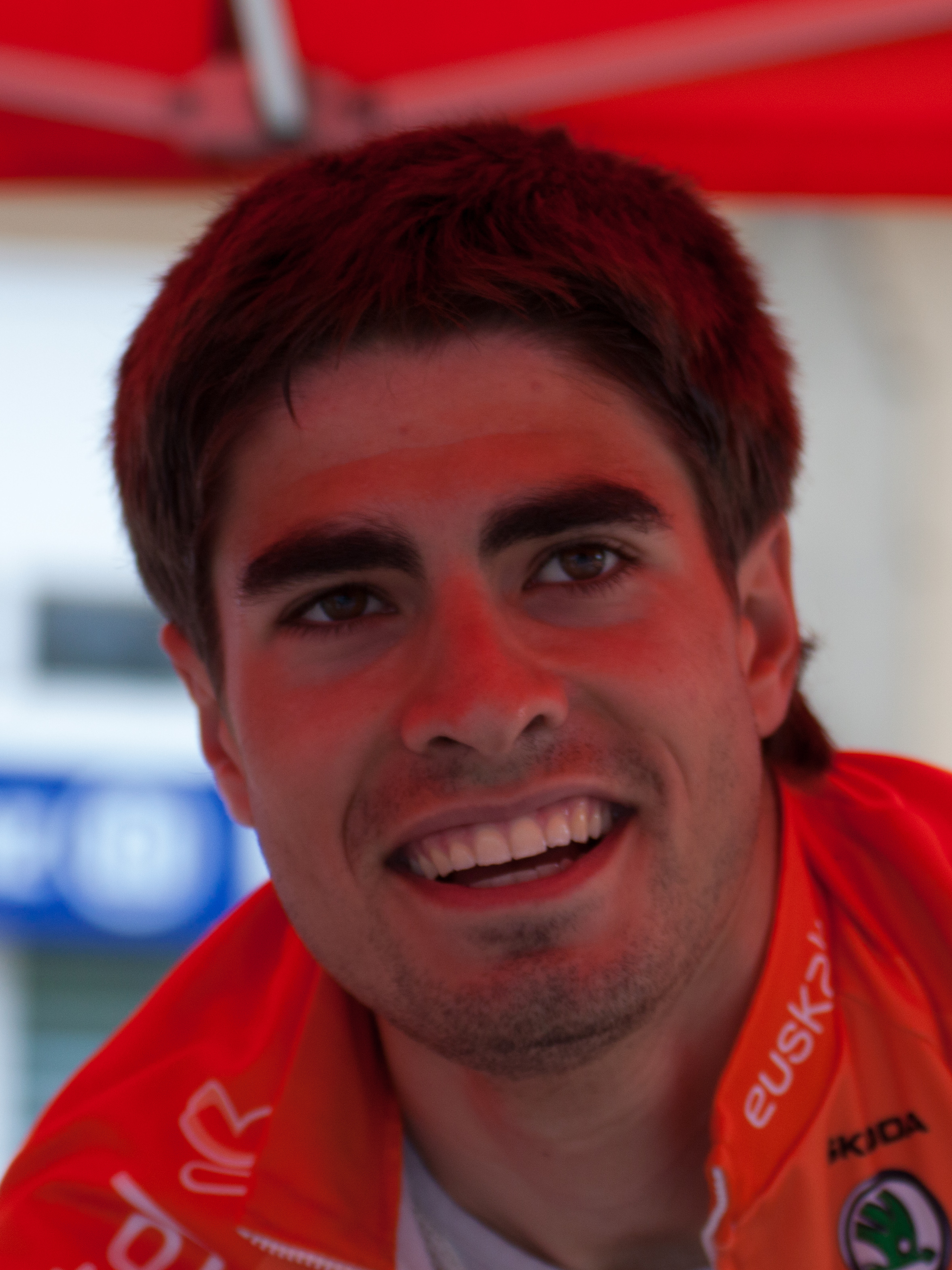
Mikel Landa took a breakthrough win as his leader Fabio Aru was distanced

To end the race's second week, the riders tackled the second high-mountain stage of the 2015 Giro d'Italia, the first of two Dolomites stages. There were three categorised climbs on the course - the second category La Fricca, the first category Passo Daone and the final first category ascent to the summit finish at Madonna di Campiglio. The ascent to Madonna di Campiglio was well known for its appearance in 1999 when Marco Pantani won the stage finishing at the ski resort. Pantani was eventually expelled from the race before the next stage due to a high hematocrit level. This stage was expected to feature another showdown between the race's main general classification favorites.

After four successive stages marred by bad weather, the riders rode the stage under clear blue skies. No rider was able to break away until the middle of the climb to La Fricca when a ten-man group slowly made their way to the front. The best-placed rider in the breakaway was Giovanni Visconti of Movistar Team, who was 6' 04" behind maglia rosa wearer, Alberto Contador, before the stage. The break was only allowed to build a gap of around 2 minutes before the peloton began the chase. As the break began to close in on the climb of Passo Daone, Visconti, Team Sky's Kanstantsin Sivtsov, AG2R La Mondiale's Hubert Dupont and BMC Racing Team's Brent Bookwalter attacked out of the breakaway and managed to build a gap again while the other six breakaway riders chose to wait for the peloton to catch up to them. On the ascent of Passo Daone, general classification contenders, Richie Porte and Rigoberto Urán were both dropped by the peloton. Porte eventually lost 27 minutes on the day and withdrew from the race the next day while Urán lost 8 minutes on the day to drop out of the top 10. Up front, Bookwalter was distanced on the ascent and at the top of the climb, Visconti took the maximum mountains classification points. In the peloton, Contador found himself isolated with no teammates around him while rival Fabio Aru still had five riders for support.

On the descent, several riders crashed and chief among them was Contador's teammate Roman Kreuziger, in ninth place overall. As the four-man break neared Madonna di Campiglio, Sivtsov and Visconti dropped back to help their teammates, leaving Dupont as the lone breakaway rider. He was eventually caught after the second intermediate sprint, where Contador sprinted to take two bonus seconds. On the final ascent, Astana continued to set the pace and the group of favourites continued to dwindle down until eight riders remained with 5 kilometres (3.1 miles) to go. When Tanel Kangert finally let go of the pace, Mikel Landa sparked the attacks at the front. He was chased down by Contador while Aru struggled behind. Aru and Yuri Trofimov eventually bridged the gap to Contador and Landa. Contador would also put in an attack but his three companions were able to chase him down. Trofimov was dropped shortly after but as the trio up front neared the final kilometre, Trofimov rejoined the group, and attacked past them, taking advantage of the general classification battle between Contador and Aru. Landa chased after Trofimov, catching and passing him with 450 metres (1,480 feet) to go. Landa stayed up front to take the stage win, two seconds ahead of Trofimov. Contador gained one second on Aru at the finish and also took the time bonuses for third place. The riders finished scattered behind, shaking up the general classification standings once more as Contador extended his lead over Aru to 2' 35" while Andrey Amador held on to his third place, 4' 19" behind in arrears. Contador stayed in pink ahead of the second and final rest day with six stages remaining in the Giro. Following Porte's withdrawal, Team Sky thus turned their hopes to Leopold König, in fifth place overall after the stage.

Stage 15 result

	Rider	Team	Time
1	Mikel Landa (ESP)	Astana	4h 22' 35"
2	Yuri Trofimov (RUS)	Team Katusha	+ 2"
3	Alberto Contador (ESP)	Tinkoff–Saxo	+ 5"
4	Fabio Aru (ITA)	Astana	+ 6"
5	Steven Kruijswijk (NED)	LottoNL–Jumbo	+ 38"
6	Andrey Amador (CRC)	Movistar Team	+ 42"
7	Leopold König (CZE)	Team Sky	+ 1' 00"
8	Tanel Kangert (EST)	Astana	+ 1' 10"
9	Alexandre Geniez (FRA)	FDJ	+ 1' 49"
10	Damiano Caruso (ITA)	BMC Racing Team	+ 2' 13"

General classification after Stage 15

	Rider	Team	Time
1	Alberto Contador (ESP)	Tinkoff–Saxo	60h 01' 34"
2	Fabio Aru (ITA)	Astana	+ 2' 35"
3	Andrey Amador (CRC)	Movistar Team	+ 4' 19"
4	Mikel Landa (ESP)	Astana	+ 4' 46"
5	Leopold König (CZE)	Team Sky	+ 6' 36"
6	Yuri Trofimov (RUS)	Team Katusha	+ 6' 58"
7	Damiano Caruso (ITA)	BMC Racing Team	+ 7' 10"
8	Maxime Monfort (BEL)	Lotto–Soudal	+ 8' 20"
9	Giovanni Visconti (ITA)	Movistar Team	+ 9' 53"
10	Alexandre Geniez (FRA)	FDJ	+ 10' 03"

== Stage 16 ==
26 May 2015 — Pinzolo to Aprica, 174 km (108.1 mi)

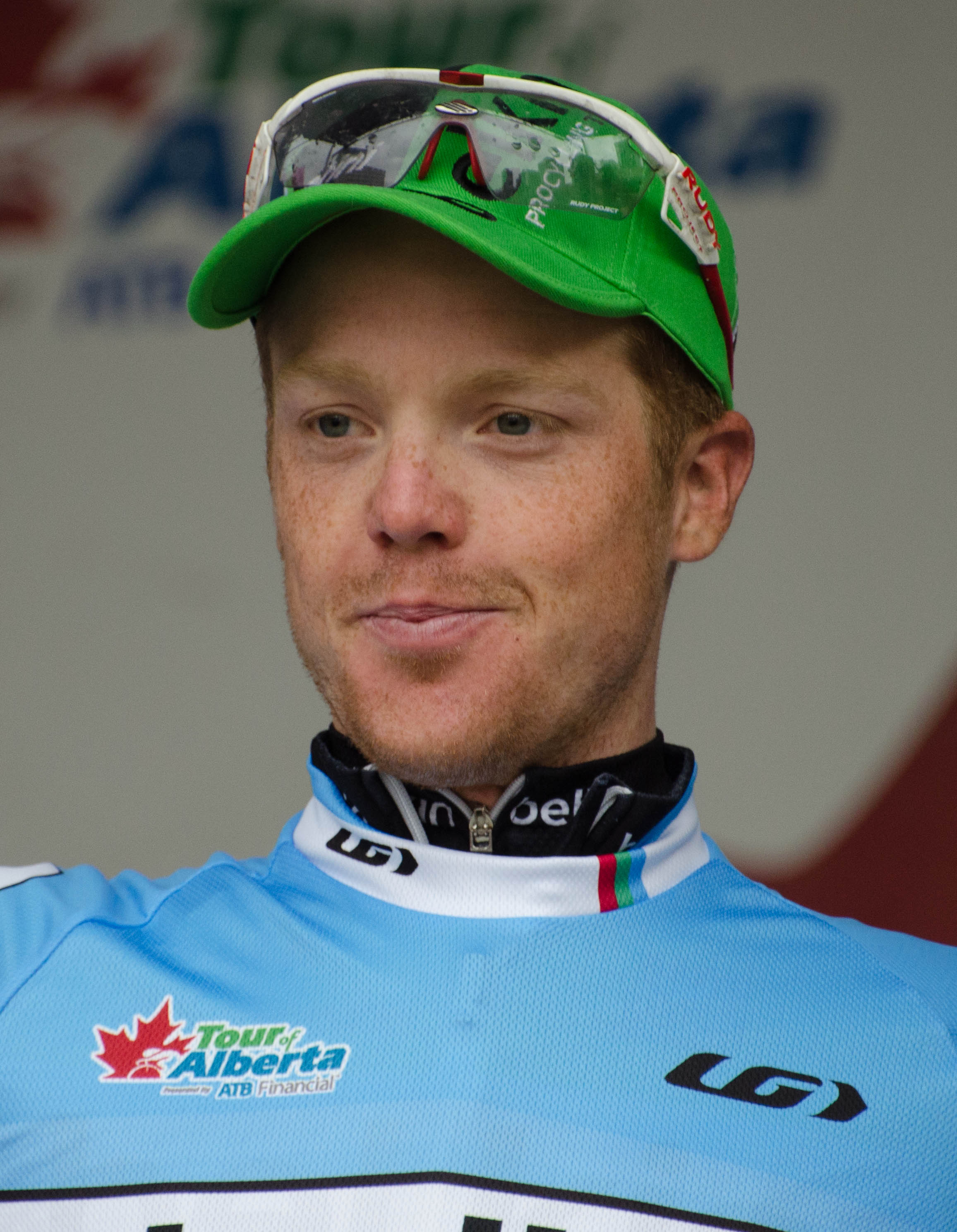
Steven Kruijswijk took the second position of the stage behind Mikel Landa

The queen stage of the 2015 Giro d'Italia, the first stage in the third week of the race consisted of five categorised climbs. The first climb, the second-category Campo Carlo Magno, commenced immediately after the start and saw the riders reach an altitude of 1,681 m (5,515 ft). After the descent, and a short false-flat section, the riders climbed the Tonale Pass, which was also a second category climb, followed by the third-category ascent to Aprica, with the riders crossing the finish of the stage for the first time on its summit. Although averaging 3.5%, the gradient topped 15% at the start of the ascent. The first intermediate sprint occurred partway through the ascent. Having descended from there and after passing the second intermediate sprint in Tirano, the riders had to tackle the Mortirolo Pass. The climb was not especially high, at 1,854 m (6,083 ft), but with an average gradient of 10.9% and reaching 18% halfway through the ascent. After a long descent, the riders ascended to Aprica again, with the finish occurring at an altitude of 1,173 m (3,848 ft).

After a sunny day to Madonna di Campiglio, the rain again played a factor on the stage. On the ascent of Campo Carlo Magno, several riders attempted to build a breakaway until nine riders were able to build a gap on the descent. The best-placed rider in the breakaway was Cannondale–Garmin's Ryder Hesjedal, who was sitting in 13th place, 11' 17" behind maglia rosa wearer, Alberto Contador. Two additional riders, Lotto–Soudal's Sander Armée and Orica–GreenEDGE's Simon Clarke, bridged over to the break to make it 11 riders in the breakaway. Their advantage only reached around two minutes after 80 kilometres (50 miles) of racing, prompting Hesjedal to attack his breakaway companions on the first ascent to Aprica. He was able to quickly build a gap of around one to two minutes on the descent. At this point, Astana's Diego Rosa fell off his bike, while Contador had a mechanical problem. At the same time, Team Katusha and Astana immediately pressed on the pace at the front, sparking a bit of controversy over respect and fair play. Contador immediately received the wheel of teammate, Ivan Basso, but by the time he was riding again, his group was nearly a minute behind the group containing Fabio Aru. Aru's group immediately caught the breakaway riders, including Hesjedal. With a deficit of 52 seconds at the start of the Mortirolo, Contador attacked out of his group.

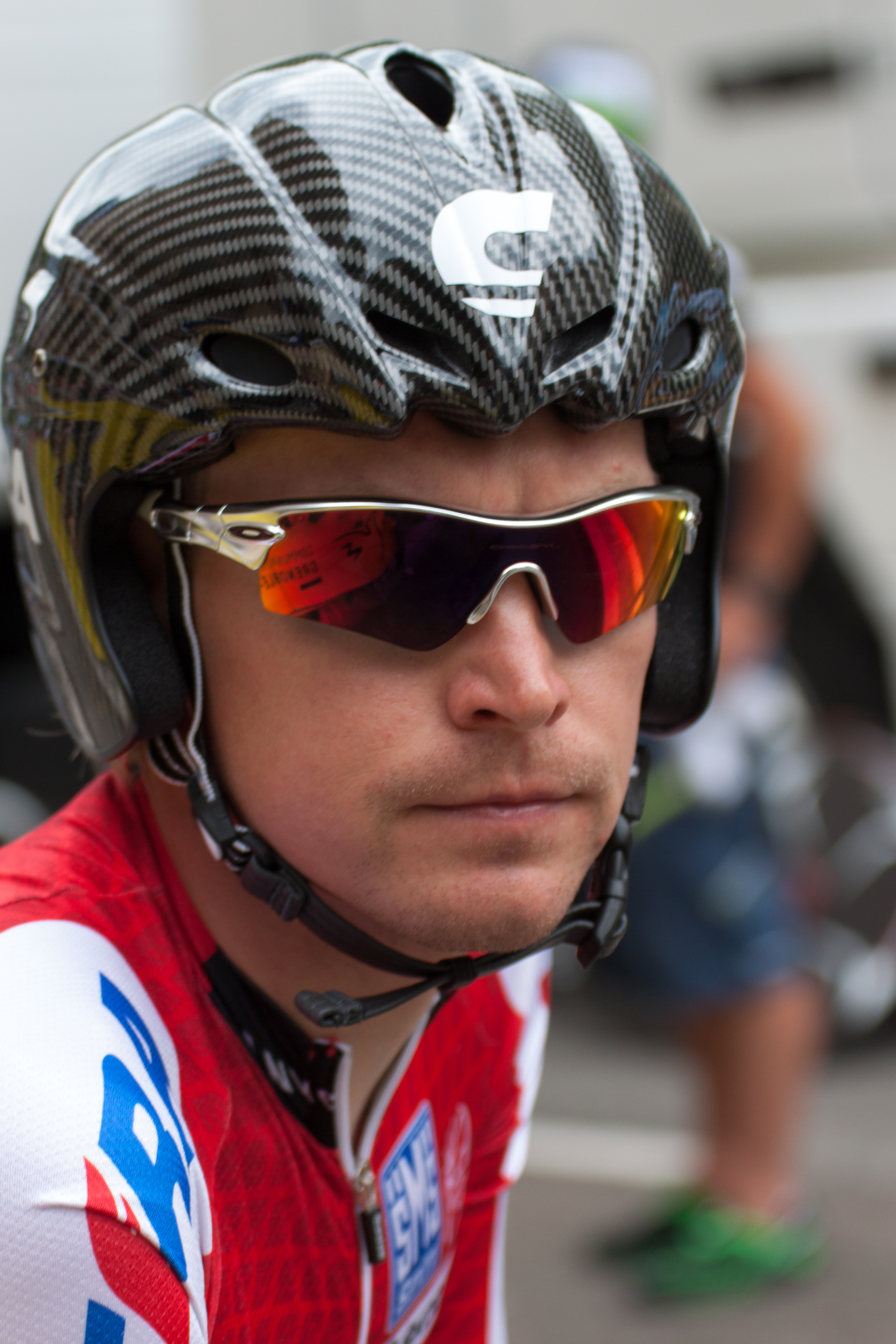
Yuri Trofimov finished fourth on the stage, and moved into the top five placings overall.

On the ascent of Mortirolo, several riders continued to fall off the back, with Mikel Landa pressing on the pace at the front. Contador quickly caught the dropped riders, working with several riders in order to bridge the gap to Aru. His deficit hovered around 40 to 50 seconds before he slowly closed the gap with the help of riders like compatriot Igor Antón. With around 40 kilometres (25 miles) to go, Aru's group was within sight of Contador and after a bit more effort, he finally bridged the gap to the leading chasers which consisted of two riders, Aru and Landa with Steven Kruijswijk further up the front. Contador soon attacked on his own, immediately pursued by Kruijswijk while Landa was instructed by Aru to give chase as well. Aru struggled to catch the leading group and he continued to lose time on the ascent. He was passed and dropped by Yuri Trofimov and Hesjedal as they closed in on the summit. At the top, it was Kruijswijk who led the leading trio while Trofimov and Hesjedal were almost a minute behind. Third-placed overall, Andrey Amador, also caught and dropped Aru as they passed the summit over a minute and a half behind the leading trio.

On the long descent, Contador set a fast pace, quickly followed by Kruijswijk and Landa. Trofimov descended the Mortirolo aggressively, dropping Hesjedal in the process. He came within ten seconds of Contador's group before dropping back. Aru also set an aggressive pace on the descent, catching up to Amador before stopping due to a mechanical problem. When Aru changed his bike, he forgot to pick up a bidon and as he was already within 20 kilometres (12 miles) of the finish, he was not allowed to get a bidon or he would be penalised. As a result, Aru had to finish the rest of the stage without having a drink. At one point, Aru had Trofimov, Hesjedal and Amador within his sights on the ascent to Aprica but he continued to drop back and he lost more time to Contador. With the leading trio within 5 kilometres (3.1 miles) of the finish, Kruijswijk attacked but he was quickly chased by Contador and Landa. In turn, Landa attacked in pursuit of another stage win and although Contador tried to give chase, Landa continued to increase his advantage. Landa would not be caught as he took his second successive stage victory, 38 seconds ahead of Kruijswijk and Contador with Amador's group finishing more than two minutes behind after distancing Hesjedal by a few metres. Landa's stage victory marked the first time that a rider won multiple stages at the 2015 race. The riders behind finished within scattered groups but at considerable distances behind as only fifteen riders finished within ten minutes of Landa's time. Trofimov's strong ride allowed him to enter the top 5 while Kruijswijk's and Hesjedal's ride moved them inside the top 10. Aru crossed the line nearly three minutes behind his teammate, Landa, and in the process, Landa moved up to second overall, 50" ahead of Aru in third but 4' 02" behind Contador, who retained his maglia rosa with five stages left.

Stage 16 result

	Rider	Team	Time
1	Mikel Landa (ESP)	Astana	5h 02' 51"
2	Steven Kruijswijk (NED)	LottoNL–Jumbo	+ 38"
3	Alberto Contador (ESP)	Tinkoff–Saxo	+ 38"
4	Yuri Trofimov (RUS)	Team Katusha	+ 2' 03"
5	Andrey Amador (CRC)	Movistar Team	+ 2' 03"
6	Ryder Hesjedal (CAN)	Cannondale–Garmin	+ 2' 10"
7	Fabio Aru (ITA)	Astana	+ 2' 51"
8	Damiano Caruso (ITA)	BMC Racing Team	+ 3' 16"
9	Leopold König (CZE)	Team Sky	+ 3' 19"
10	Carlos Betancur (COL)	AG2R La Mondiale	+ 3' 19"

General classification after Stage 16

	Rider	Team	Time
1	Alberto Contador (ESP)	Tinkoff–Saxo	65h 04' 59"
2	Mikel Landa (ESP)	Astana	+ 4' 02"
3	Fabio Aru (ITA)	Astana	+ 4' 52"
4	Andrey Amador (CRC)	Movistar Team	+ 5' 48"
5	Yuri Trofimov (RUS)	Team Katusha	+ 8' 27"
6	Leopold König (CZE)	Team Sky	+ 9' 31"
7	Damiano Caruso (ITA)	BMC Racing Team	+ 9' 52"
8	Steven Kruijswijk (NED)	LottoNL–Jumbo	+ 11' 40"
9	Alexandre Geniez (FRA)	FDJ	+ 12' 48"
10	Ryder Hesjedal (CAN)	Cannondale–Garmin	+ 12' 49"

== Stage 17 ==
27 May 2015 — Tirano to Lugano (Switzerland), 134 km (83.3 mi)

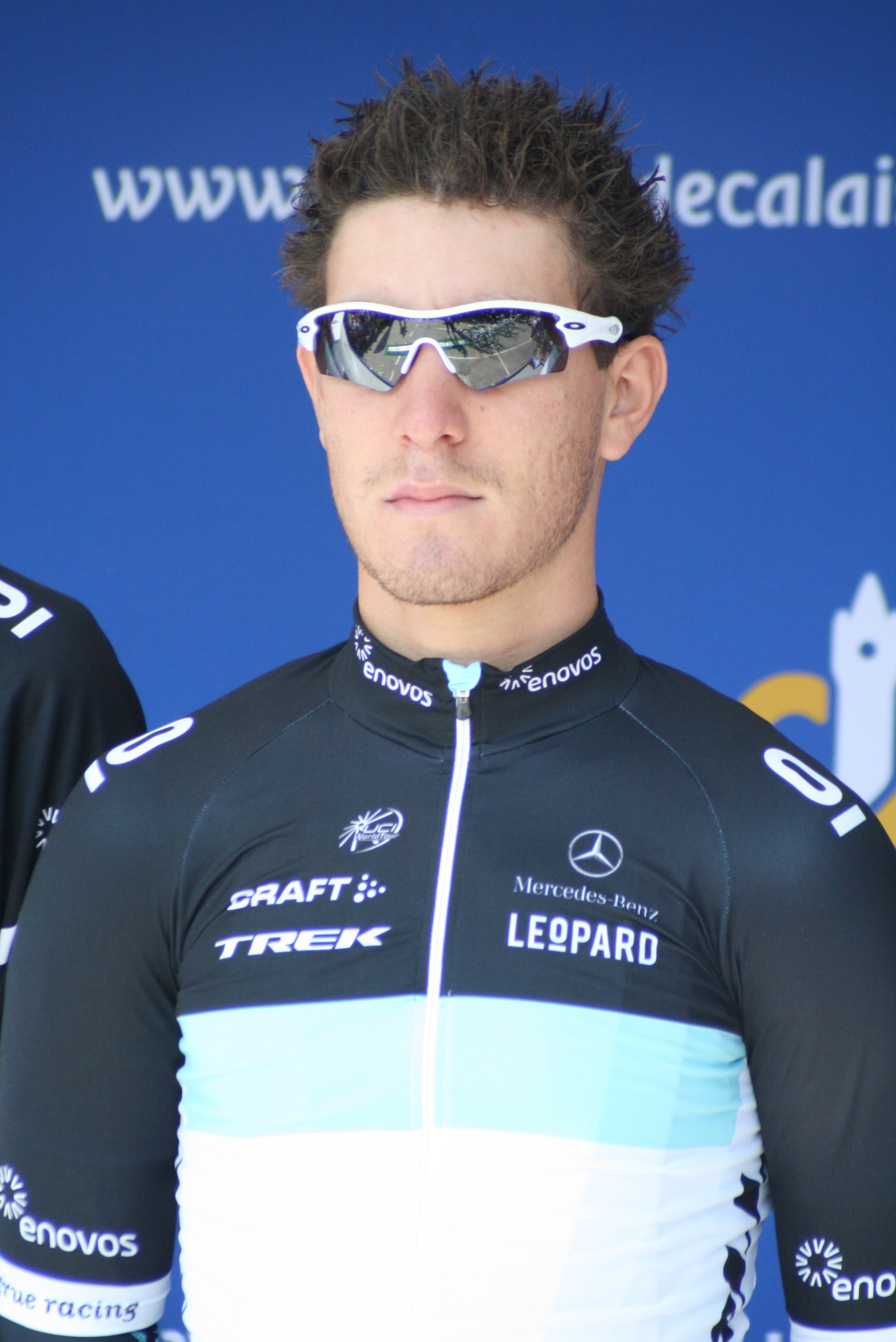
Giacomo Nizzolo moved into the lead of the points classification with second place on the stage

The only stage of the 2015 Giro d'Italia to go outside of Italy, the stage was the last chance for the sprinters to win a stage before the final flat stage to Milan. 8 kilometres (5.0 miles) from the start of the stage, the riders tackled the only categorised climb of the route - the third category ascent of Teglio. Following the descent, the course was mostly flat with only two short and uncategorised climbs near the end of the stage. At around 8 kilometres (5.0 miles) from the end of the stage, the riders reached Switzerland, finishing near the Lake of Lugano.

Just 2 kilometres (1.2 miles) into the stage, Etixx–Quick-Step's Iljo Keisse, Androni Giocattoli–Sidermec's Marco Bandiera and Nippo–Vini Fantini's Giacomo Berlato immediately went on the attack. Despite the fact that no one in the breakaway posed a threat in the general classification, the trio was only allowed an advantage of around three minutes, with the sprinters' teams controlling the pace. At the first intermediate sprint, the break took the first three places before points classification leader, Elia Viviani, outsprinted Giacomo Nizzolo to increase his lead in the classification. At the second intermediate sprint, the break took the first three places again before Nizzolo outsprinted Viviani to negate Viviani's earlier advantage gained. Up front, the breakaway's advantage began to drop quickly and with 40 kilometres (25 miles) remaining, the advantage was down to less than a minute before the peloton slowed the pace a bit. However, with 30 kilometres (19 miles) left, the break's lead was just around 30 seconds before the break was finally caught with 27 kilometres (17 miles) remaining in the stage.

With around 25 kilometres (16 miles) remaining, Adam Hansen and Patrick Gretsch attacked off the front on a short uncategorised ascent. Darwin Atapuma tried to give chase and he successfully did so after a few seconds of chasing. Hansen soon took off solo with Gretsch and Atapuma returning to the peloton. Hansen, riding in his 11th consecutive Grand Tour, was able to build a lead of 20 seconds before the Team Giant–Alpecin-led peloton brought the gap down quickly. Shortly before the race reached Switzerland, Hansen was caught and Tinkoff–Saxo took over the pacing in the peloton. With 5.5 kilometres (3.4 miles) left from the finish, Tom-Jelte Slagter attacked in a bid to win the stage. He was quickly chased by Philippe Gilbert but both riders were unable to build a substantial gap. Luca Paolini was next to attack with around 3 kilometres (1.9 miles) remaining and he was able to build a decent gap. However, the peloton quickly gave chase and with around 1 kilometre (0.62 miles) remaining, Paolini was caught. During the finale, Luka Mezgec tried to sprint for his second Giro stage win but Lampre–Merida did a perfect lead-out once again, setting up Sacha Modolo for his second stage win and his team's fourth in the race. Nizzolo overtook Mezgec to take second on the stage and he assumed the lead in the points classification after Viviani missed out on the top 10. The general classification contenders finished safely within the peloton and with no change overall, Alberto Contador kept the maglia rosa.

Stage 17 result

	Rider	Team	Time
1	Sacha Modolo (ITA)	Lampre–Merida	3h 07' 51"
2	Giacomo Nizzolo (ITA)	Trek Factory Racing	+ 0"
3	Luka Mezgec (SLO)	Team Giant–Alpecin	+ 0"
4	Heinrich Haussler (AUS)	IAM Cycling	+ 0"
5	Davide Appollonio (ITA)	Androni Giocattoli–Sidermec	+ 0"
6	Stig Broeckx (BEL)	Lotto–Soudal	+ 0"
7	Juan José Lobato (ESP)	Movistar Team	+ 0"
8	Alexander Porsev (RUS)	Team Katusha	+ 0"
9	Kévin Reza (FRA)	FDJ	+ 0"
10	Nick van der Lijke (NED)	LottoNL–Jumbo	+ 0"

General classification after Stage 17

	Rider	Team	Time
1	Alberto Contador (ESP)	Tinkoff–Saxo	68h 12' 50"
2	Mikel Landa (ESP)	Astana	+ 4' 02"
3	Fabio Aru (ITA)	Astana	+ 4' 52"
4	Andrey Amador (CRC)	Movistar Team	+ 5' 48"
5	Yuri Trofimov (RUS)	Team Katusha	+ 8' 27"
6	Leopold König (CZE)	Team Sky	+ 9' 31"
7	Damiano Caruso (ITA)	BMC Racing Team	+ 9' 52"
8	Steven Kruijswijk (NED)	LottoNL–Jumbo	+ 11' 40"
9	Alexandre Geniez (FRA)	FDJ	+ 12' 48"
10	Ryder Hesjedal (CAN)	Cannondale–Garmin	+ 13' 01"

== Stage 18 ==
28 May 2015 — Melide (Switzerland) to Verbania, 170 km (105.6 mi)

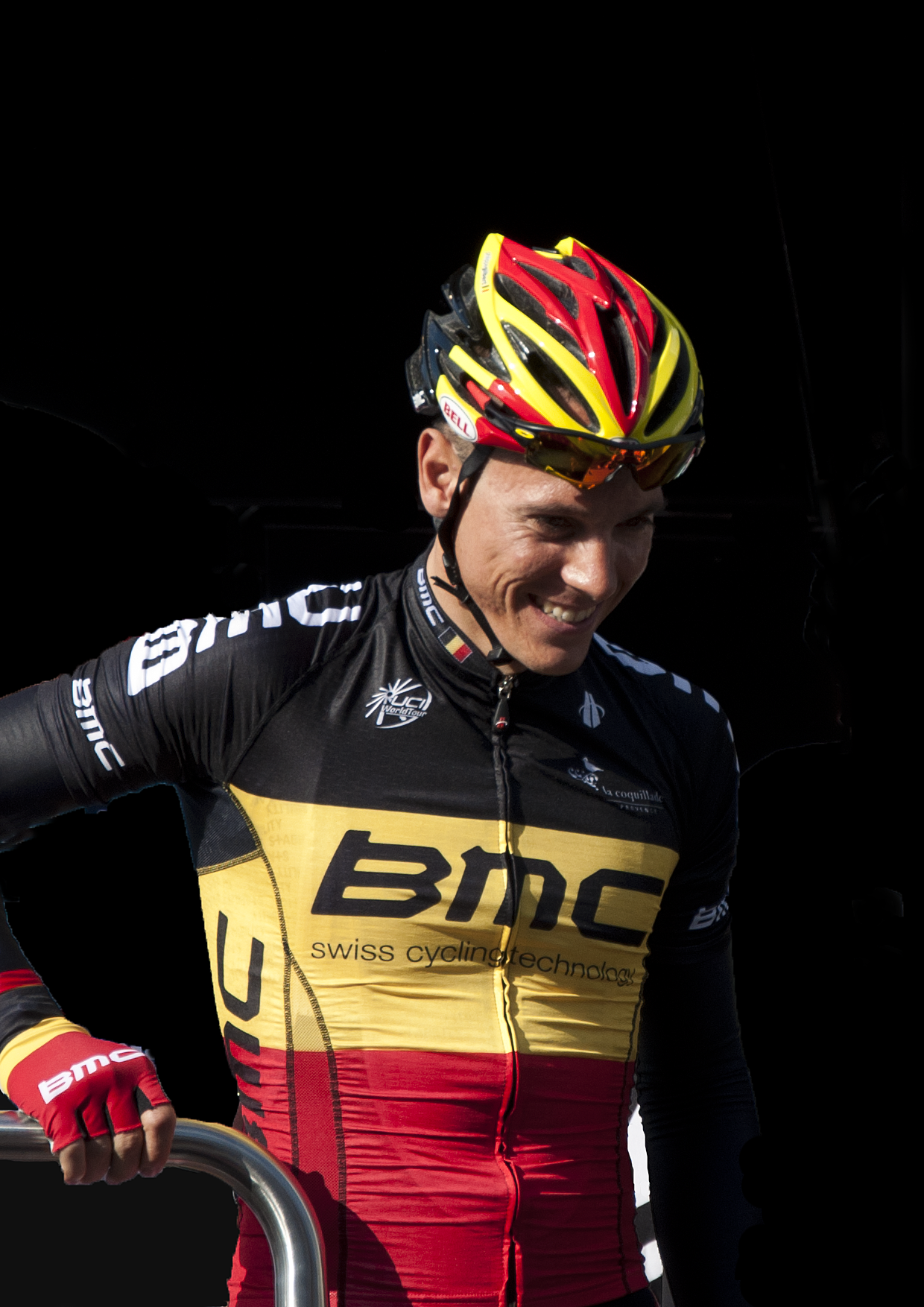
Philippe Gilbert took his second stage victory, having bridged from a chasing group to the breakaway before soloing to victory

Probably the last chance for a breakaway to bring home a victory, the stage featured the first category climb of Monte Ologno near the end of the stage. The first 124 kilometres (77 miles) of the stage was mostly flat but had several lumps along the way before the riders tackled the climb of Monte Ologno. The climb was expected to test everyone, especially the general classification contenders, as it was 10.4 kilometres (6.5 miles) long at an average gradient of 9%. After reaching its summit and after a very short descent, the riders ascended an uncategorised climb before descending again. Another short uncategorised climb was located along the way but the descent went all the way until 6 kilometres (3.7 miles) remaining, where the riders tackled a flat ride to the finish in Verbania.

A fast start to the stage prevented any break from forming until 44 kilometres (27 miles) into the stage when a 14-man group attacked out of the peloton. However, shortly after the break was made, Lampre–Merida's Roberto Ferrari and Nippo–Vini Fantini's Damiano Cunego crashed up front. While Ferrari dropped down to a chase group with Trek Factory Racing's Fabio Felline and Movistar Team's Jesús Herrada, Cunego withdrew from the race. The peloton caught the chase group and allowed the break to have a maximum advantage of around 13 minutes, almost making sure that someone from the break would take the stage win. It was not until the climb of Monte Ologno that the day featured more drama in terms of the general classification and the stage win.

On the ascent of Monte Ologno, the break split into two with some riders from the breakaway dropping back on the climb's steep gradients. The gap between the two breakaway groups hovered at around a minute. Behind, a crash took place, bringing down most of the Team Sky riders but the most notable rider caught behind it was Astana's Mikel Landa, who was sitting in second place overall. At the front of the peloton, maglia rosa wearer, Alberto Contador, told his team, Tinkoff–Saxo, to up the pace. After a while, Contador attacked solo and he immediately built a gap of around two minutes. Contador's attack was presumed by many as payback for what happened on the Mortirolo two days earlier but Contador said after the stage that he told his team to press on the pace even before Landa was caught behind in the crash. A chase group consisting of most of the top 10 riders formed in pursuit of Contador with Landa joining that group after a huge effort. Further up the climb, Contador dropped his chain but he was quickly helped by his mechanic and he was able to keep his lead. Eventually, the only rider to catch up to Contador was Cannondale–Garmin's Ryder Hesjedal, who caught up to Contador at the summit of the climb at around 7 minutes behind the breakaway with the chase group a further minute behind the duo.

On the descent, Davide Villella, who was an original part of the breakaway, was caught by Hesjedal and Contador. Villella, who was Hesjedal's teammate, helped the duo build and maintain their advantage over their chasers. Contador's group maintained a minute-and-a-half advantage over their chase group but still at a large deficit behind the breakaway riders. Up front, the first breakaway group led the second breakaway group by nearly a minute before BMC Racing Team's Philippe Gilbert attacked from the second breakaway group and he was able to get to the front group on the descent. With 19 kilometres (12 miles) left for the break, Gilbert immediately attacked and he was able to build a substantial gap. Several riders from the remnants of the breakaway tried to chase Gilbert but only Francesco Manuel Bongiorno managed to build a gap over the other riders. Gilbert managed to stay up front to take his second win of the race with Bongiorno crossing the finish line 47 seconds behind. The remnants of the break finished a further 14 seconds behind Bongiorno while Hesjedal led Contador across the line, 6' 05" behind Gilbert. The group with Aru and Landa crossed the line 7' 18" behind Gilbert and crucially, 1' 13" behind Contador and Hesjedal. Hesjedal's ride moved him up one spot in the top ten to ninth overall, eight seconds behind eighth-placed Steven Kruijswijk. As a result of his successful attack, Contador extended his lead over Landa to 5' 15" with two key mountain stages and one flat stage remaining in the race.

Stage 18 result

	Rider	Team	Time
1	Philippe Gilbert (BEL)	BMC Racing Team	4h 04' 14"
2	Francesco Manuel Bongiorno (ITA)	Bardiani–CSF	+ 47"
3	Sylvain Chavanel (FRA)	IAM Cycling	+ 1' 01"
4	Matteo Busato (ITA)	Southeast Pro Cycling	+ 1' 01"
5	Amaël Moinard (FRA)	BMC Racing Team	+ 1' 01"
6	David de la Cruz (ESP)	Etixx–Quick-Step	+ 1' 01"
7	Rinaldo Nocentini (ITA)	AG2R La Mondiale	+ 1' 01"
8	Kanstantsin Sivtsov (BLR)	Team Sky	+ 1' 01"
9	Chad Haga (USA)	Team Giant–Alpecin	+ 2' 42"
10	Pieter Weening (NED)	Orica–GreenEDGE	+ 3' 55"

General classification after Stage 18

	Rider	Team	Time
1	Alberto Contador (ESP)	Tinkoff–Saxo	72h 23' 09"
2	Mikel Landa (ESP)	Astana	+ 5' 15"
3	Fabio Aru (ITA)	Astana	+ 6' 05"
4	Andrey Amador (CRC)	Movistar Team	+ 7' 01"
5	Yuri Trofimov (RUS)	Team Katusha	+ 9' 40"
6	Leopold König (CZE)	Team Sky	+ 10' 44"
7	Damiano Caruso (ITA)	BMC Racing Team	+ 11' 05"
8	Steven Kruijswijk (NED)	LottoNL–Jumbo	+ 12' 53"
9	Ryder Hesjedal (CAN)	Cannondale–Garmin	+ 13' 01"
10	Alexandre Geniez (FRA)	FDJ	+ 14' 01"

== Stage 19 ==
29 May 2015 — Gravellona Toce to Cervinia, 236 km (146.6 mi)

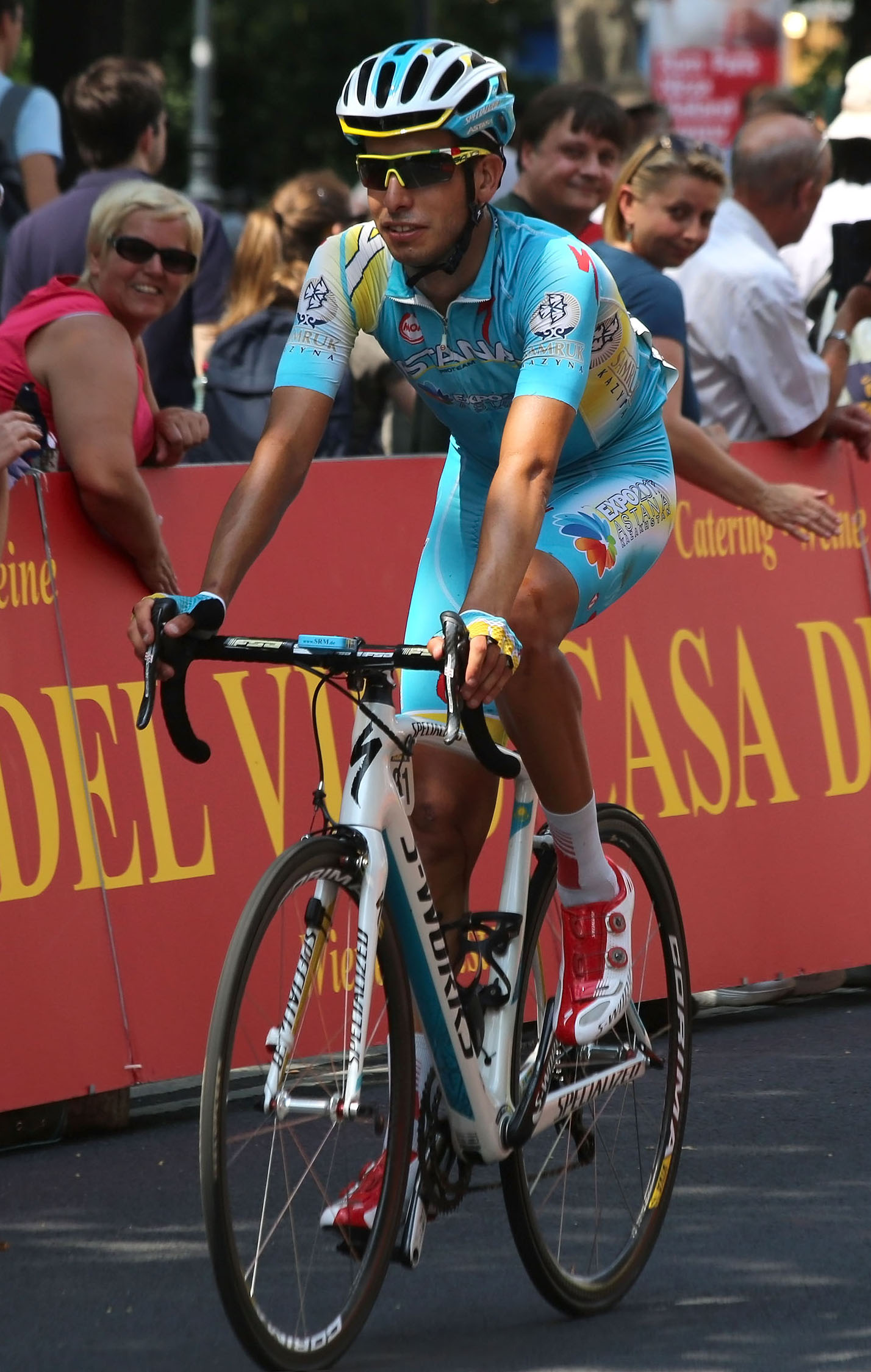
Fabio Aru resurrected and took the win

The penultimate mountain stage of the 2015 Giro d'Italia was expected to feature one of the final showdowns between the main general classification contenders. The first 151 kilometres (94 miles) of the stage was a bit hilly, featuring the third category climb of Croce Serra. The final 85 kilometres (53 miles) of the stage was crucial as it featured three first category climbs. The riders had to tackle the climb of Saint-Barthélemy first, an almost 20-kilometre (12-mile)-long ascent with an average gradient of 6.7%. Following the descent, the riders climbed the Col De Saint-Pantaléon, which was 16.5 kilometres (10.3 miles) long and had an average gradient of 7.2%. After another descent, the riders climbed to Cervinia with the finish line located at a height of 2,001 metres (6,565 ft). The final climb was not very steep, averaging only 5% but was 19.2 kilometres (11.9 miles) in length. The hardest part of the climb came in its middle section with an 8-kilometre (5.0-mile) section having an average gradient of around 7%, before the riders completed the last 3 kilometres (1.9 miles) to the finish in Cervinia. 35 kilometres (22 miles) of the last 44 kilometres (27 miles) of the stage went uphill.

Another fast start to the stage prevented any breakaway from forming easily. After a while, eight riders broke clear from the peloton. The break was not allowed to build a large gap, however, as they only had a maximum advantage of around four minutes on the peloton. Astana soon took over the chase and the gap began to come down. On the first difficult climb of the day, the climb of Saint-Barthélemy, the break began to dwindle down as some of the breakaway riders dropped on the climb. From behind, Steven Kruijswijk and Beñat Intxausti attacked in a battle for the mountains classification. The duo built a short gap before dropping back with Intxausti taking more points at the summit of the climb. As the climb of Col De Saint-Pantaléon got underway, Movistar Team's Giovanni Visconti went off solo with Team Katusha's Pavel Kochetkov and Team Sky's Vasil Kiryienka chasing him. Kiryienka was caught on the climb while Visconti continued to stay up front with Kochetkov chasing him. Kochetkov slowly fell back while the Astana-led peloton kept Visconti's advantage hovering around two minutes on the maglia rosa group. At the summit, Visconti took maximum points, taking over the lead in the mountains classification.

On the short descent of the climb, Kochetkov only had a gap of around 20 seconds over the peloton while Visconti still had a lead of almost two minutes. As the riders reached the lower slopes of the climb to Cervinia, Kochetkov was caught by the Astana-led peloton while Visconti saw his advantage continue to shrink quickly. With around 10 kilometres (6.2 miles) left in the stage, Visconti was finally caught and several minutes later, Mikel Landa gave in a small dig at the front, followed quickly by maglia rosa wearer, Alberto Contador, and Ryder Hesjedal. After the trio were caught by a small number of riders, Hesjedal attacked and he quickly built a substantial advantage. Shortly after, Fabio Aru, who struggled in the previous mountain stages, attacked from a small chase group while Contador chose to mark Landa instead of chasing Aru. Aru quickly bridged over to Hesjedal and he immediately accelerated off the front, dropping Hesjedal in the process. Aru continued to increase his advantage to the line, soloing to a 28-second victory over Hesjedal. Rigoberto Urán, who also struggled in the previous mountain stages, crossed the line in third at 1' 10" down on Aru following a great ride while a chase group containing Contador, Landa, Kruijswijk and Tanel Kangert finished 1' 18" behind. Another strong ride from Hesjedal saw him rise to seventh in the general classification standings while Aru regained his second place from his teammate, Landa, with an advantage of 38 seconds over his teammate but with a 4' 37" deficit to Contador, who continued to stay in pink with one final mountain stage and a flat stage remaining in the race.

Stage 19 result

	Rider	Team	Time
1	Fabio Aru (ITA)	Astana	6h 24' 13"
2	Ryder Hesjedal (CAN)	Cannondale–Garmin	+ 28"
3	Rigoberto Urán (COL)	Etixx–Quick-Step	+ 1' 10"
4	Tanel Kangert (EST)	Astana	+ 1' 18"
5	Steven Kruijswijk (NED)	LottoNL–Jumbo	+ 1' 18"
6	Alberto Contador (ESP)	Tinkoff–Saxo	+ 1' 18"
7	Mikel Landa (ESP)	Astana	+ 1' 18"
8	Leopold König (CZE)	Team Sky	+ 1' 21"
9	Mikel Nieve (ESP)	Team Sky	+ 1' 24"
10	Alexandre Geniez (FRA)	FDJ	+ 2' 24"

General classification after Stage 19

	Rider	Team	Time
1	Alberto Contador (ESP)	Tinkoff–Saxo	78h 48' 40"
2	Fabio Aru (ITA)	Astana	+ 4' 37"
3	Mikel Landa (ESP)	Astana	+ 5' 15"
4	Andrey Amador (CRC)	Movistar Team	+ 8' 10"
5	Leopold König (CZE)	Team Sky	+ 10' 47"
6	Yuri Trofimov (RUS)	Team Katusha	+ 11' 11"
7	Ryder Hesjedal (CAN)	Cannondale–Garmin	+ 12' 05"
8	Damiano Caruso (ITA)	BMC Racing Team	+ 12' 14"
9	Steven Kruijswijk (NED)	LottoNL–Jumbo	+ 12' 53"
10	Alexandre Geniez (FRA)	FDJ	+ 15' 07"

== Stage 20 ==
30 May 2015 — Saint-Vincent to Sestriere, 196 km (121.8 mi)

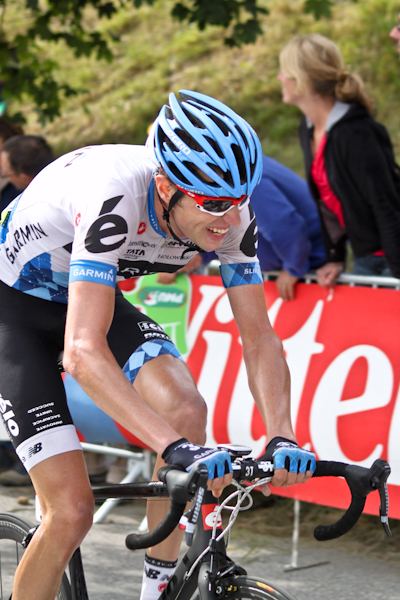
Former Giro d'Italia winner Ryder Hesjedal finished second on the stage, to move up to fifth overall.

The final mountain stage of the race decided the placings in the overall general classification. The first 150 kilometres (93 miles) of the stage served as warm-up before the riders tackled the climb of the Colle delle Finestre. With its summit at a height of 2,178 metres (7,146 feet), it was the Cima Coppi as the highest point reached in the race. The climb, with 45 hairpins, was 18.5 kilometres (11.5 miles) long with an average gradient of 9.2%. The first half of the climb was paved, before the remainder was run on dirt roads. Following a short descent, the riders ascended the easier third category climb to Sestriere. The climb was 9.2 kilometres (5.7 miles) long and averaged 5.4%. The finish line was located at a height of 2,035 metres (6,677 feet).

Several kilometres after the start of the stage, nine riders broke clear of the peloton. The breakaway group was not allowed to build a large gap, however, as they were only allowed to build a maximum advantage of nearly three minutes. As the riders reached the foot of the climb of the Colle delle Finestre, the break's advantage was down to around a minute before Nippo–Vini Fantini's Giacomo Berlato attacked his breakaway companions with Team Katusha's Ilnur Zakarin chasing him solo. The seven other breakaway riders were quickly caught by the peloton. Berlato eventually struggled on the climb as he was passed by Zakarin. In the peloton, Bardiani–CSF's Stefano Pirazzi broke clear to pursue Zakarin on the climb. Zakarin's advantage reached nearly two minutes before Tanel Kangert started the moves in the peloton. He quickly brought most of the general classification contenders with him before attacking once again. Pirazzi was eventually caught by the maglia rosa group as Zakarin continued to stay up front. With the gap at around a minute to Zakarin, Mikel Landa attacked out of the maglia rosa group. Maglia rosa wearer, Alberto Contador, tried to chase him but Landa managed to build a substantial gap on Contador's group. After a while, Ryder Hesjedal accelerated and he was quickly pursued by Steven Kruijswijk, Rigoberto Urán and Fabio Aru, while Contador struggled on the climb. Contador only had Kangert with him but Kangert attacked as well to keep Contador isolated. Up front, Landa was able to catch Zakarin with Landa taking the Cima Coppi at the summit of the Colle delle Finestre. Aru's group crossed the summit at nearly a minute behind Landa and Zakarin while Contador reached the summit a minute and a half behind.

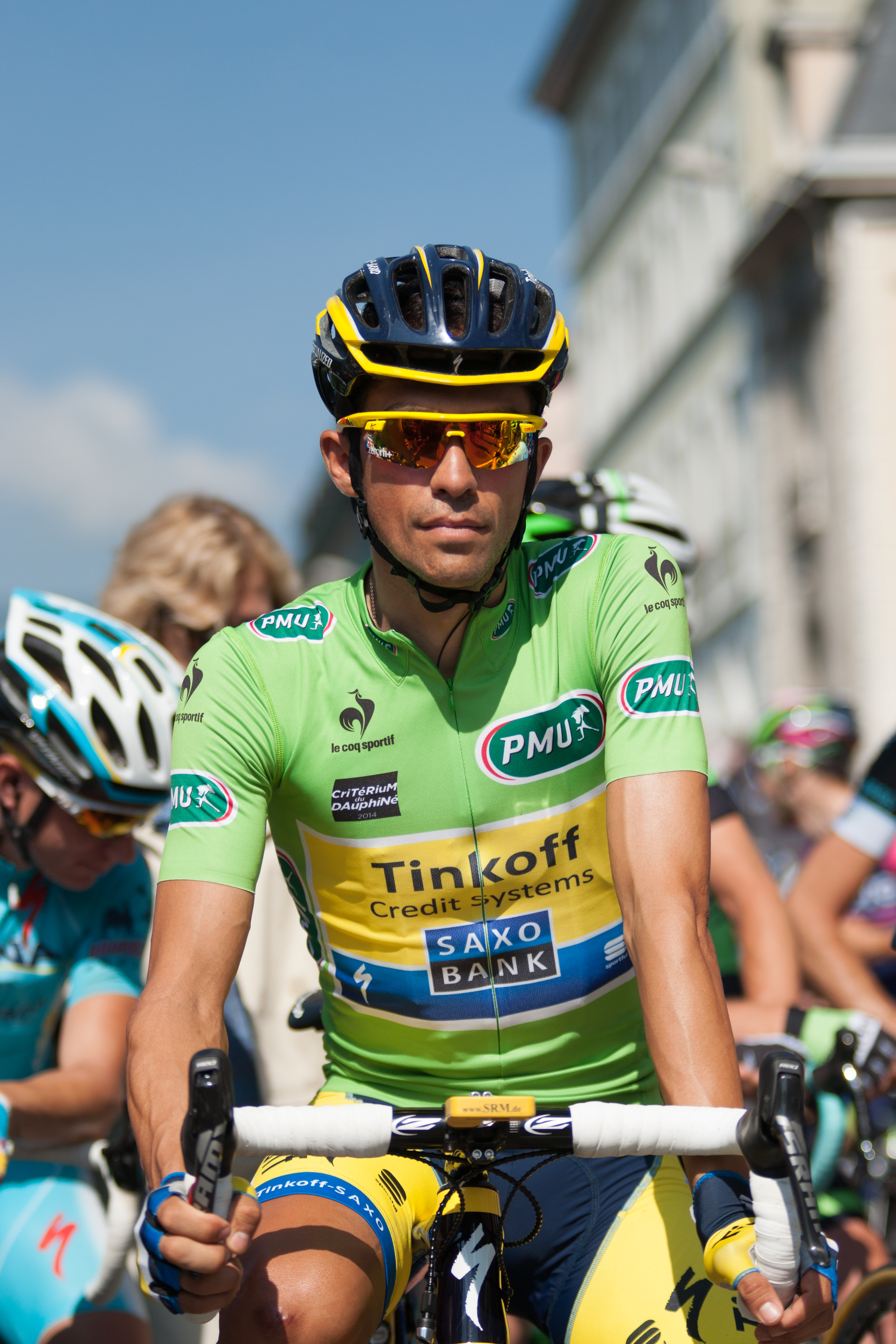
Alberto Contador lost two-and-a-half minutes to Fabio Aru, but maintained his overall lead heading into the final stage.

On the descent, Contador managed to hold the gap at around a minute and a half. Meanwhile, up front, Zakarin refused to work with Landa, prompting Landa to wait for Aru's group. From behind, Contador managed to catch Kangert and he was able to cut the gap to the leading riders to under a minute. The leading riders eventually began to work together in a final chance to try and take the maglia rosa from Contador but despite the fact that their gap increased over Contador, they were not able to really threaten Contador's lead. With around 2 kilometres (1.2 miles) left, Aru attacked in pursuit of the stage win. He was immediately chased by Urán but Aru continued to build his gap. Aru eventually took his second successive stage win, his team's fifth of the race as he finished 18 seconds ahead of Hesjedal, who passed Urán on the finish. Urán finished the stage, 24 seconds behind Aru with Landa and Kruijswijk finishing in fourth and fifth, respectively while Contador, pumping his fist, crossed the line 2' 25" behind Aru. Hesjedal's ride moved him inside the top 5 of the general classification and Kruijswijk's ride allowed him to move up two spots to seventh overall. Although Contador lost two-and-a-half minutes on what he described as an "off-day", he kept the maglia rosa with a lead of 2' 02" and with just a flat stage remaining, he was on the cusp of winning his second Giro d'Italia.

Stage 20 result

	Rider	Team	Time
1	Fabio Aru (ITA)	Astana	5h 12' 25"
2	Ryder Hesjedal (CAN)	Cannondale–Garmin	+ 18"
3	Rigoberto Urán (COL)	Etixx–Quick-Step	+ 24"
4	Mikel Landa (ESP)	Astana	+ 24"
5	Steven Kruijswijk (NED)	LottoNL–Jumbo	+ 34"
6	Alberto Contador (ESP)	Tinkoff–Saxo	+ 2' 25"
7	Tanel Kangert (EST)	Astana	+ 2' 28"
8	Franco Pellizotti (ITA)	Androni Giocattoli–Sidermec	+ 2' 28"
9	Leopold König (CZE)	Team Sky	+ 2' 28"
10	Diego Rosa (ITA)	Astana	+ 2' 28"

General classification after Stage 20

	Rider	Team	Time
1	Alberto Contador (ESP)	Tinkoff–Saxo	84h 03' 30"
2	Fabio Aru (ITA)	Astana	+ 2' 02"
3	Mikel Landa (ESP)	Astana	+ 3' 14"
4	Andrey Amador (CRC)	Movistar Team	+ 8' 19"
5	Ryder Hesjedal (CAN)	Cannondale–Garmin	+ 9' 52"
6	Leopold König (CZE)	Team Sky	+ 10' 50"
7	Steven Kruijswijk (NED)	LottoNL–Jumbo	+ 11' 02"
8	Damiano Caruso (ITA)	BMC Racing Team	+ 12' 17"
9	Alexandre Geniez (FRA)	FDJ	+ 16' 00"
10	Yuri Trofimov (RUS)	Team Katusha	+ 16' 23"

== Stage 21 ==
31 May 2015 — Turin to Milan, 185 km (115.0 mi)

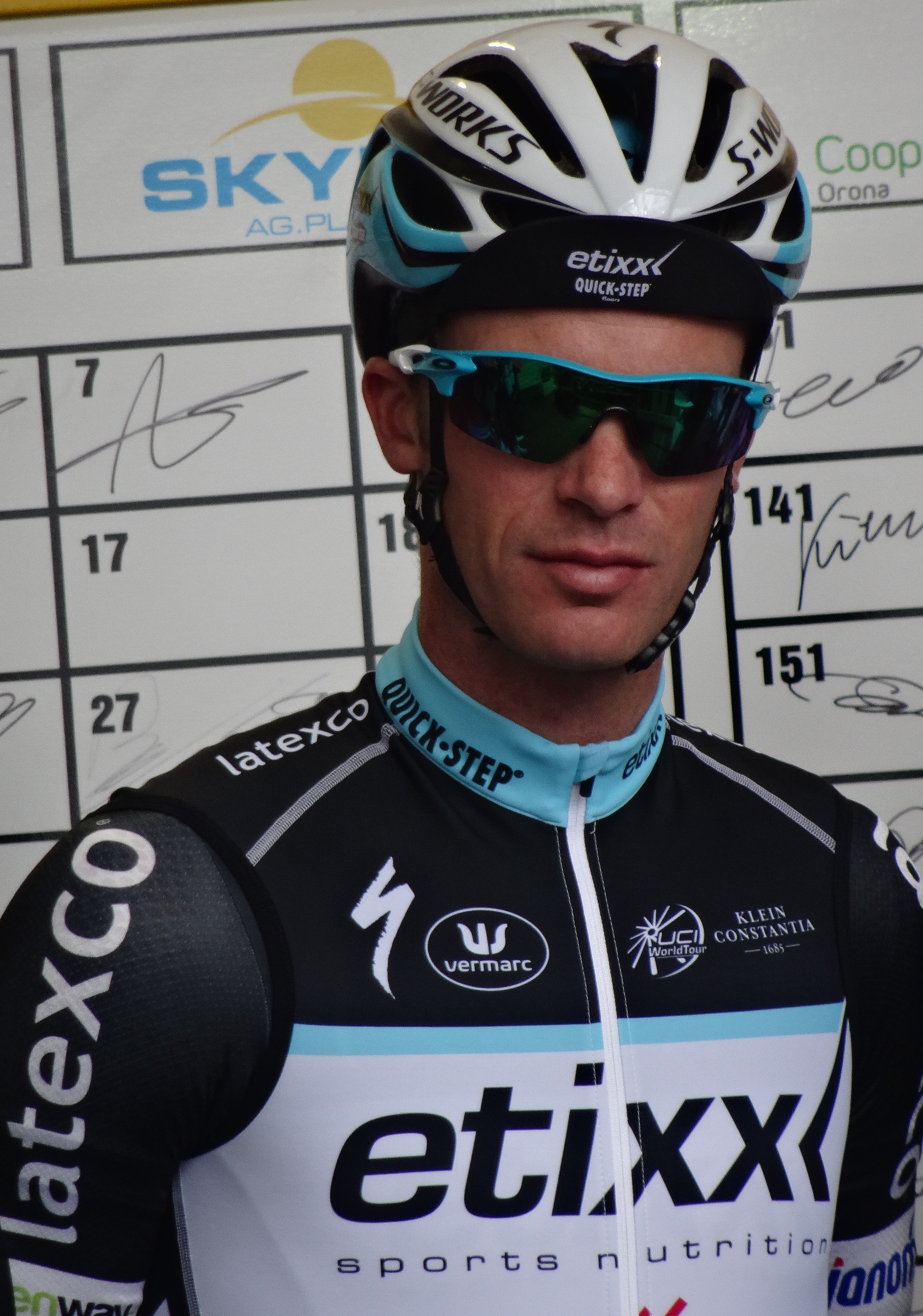
Iljo Keisse made sure that the sprinters' plans were foiled by taking the final stage

The final stage of the race saw the race finish in Milan for the first time since 2012. There were no categorised climbs on the route so it was expected that the pure sprinters would battle it out for the stage win. The course ended with seven laps of a 5.35-kilometre (3.32-mile) circuit. Barring any disasters, it was expected that Alberto Contador would cross the finish line of the stage as the winner of the Giro d'Italia and it was also expected that Giovanni Visconti and Fabio Aru would confirm their wins in the mountains and young rider classifications, respectively. However, the points classification was to be decided during the stage.

As expected, no riders went into the breakaway for almost the first half of the stage. 86 kilometres (53 miles) into the stage, the first attacks were made as three BMC Racing Team riders, Philippe Gilbert, Silvan Dillier and Marcus Burghardt and Lampre–Merida's Maximiliano Richeze pulled out a gap of around a minute. Gilbert's goal during the stage was to take the points classification and he managed to get closer to that goal as he won the first intermediate sprint. The four riders eventually took it easy as they waited for the peloton to catch up to them. After the quartet were caught, AG2R La Mondiale riders, Axel Domont and Patrick Gretsch attacked as well but they were immediately caught by the Tinkoff–Saxo-led peloton. With Tinkoff–Saxo setting a fast pace, no attacks were successful until after the first of seven laps of the circuit in Milan when Etixx–Quick-Step's Iljo Keisse and Orica–GreenEDGE's Luke Durbridge attacked the peloton.

The duo were able to build a gap of around 40 seconds with other teams in the peloton contributing to the chase. Along the way, Team Giant–Alpecin's Luka Mezgec and Team Sky's Leopold König suffered punctures as the duo up front continued to maintain their gap. After a while, Gilbert and IAM Cycling's Heinrich Haussler also suffered punctures as the leading duo kept their advantage at around 40 seconds. Several teams began contributing to the chase but the leading duo worked perfectly together as they held a pretty healthy gap on the peloton heading into the last kilometre of the stage. As the final kilometre wore on, Durbridge and Keisse began playing cat and mouse before Durbridge started his sprint first. However, Keisse came through to the front to take the stage win, his first victory in a Grand Tour. IAM Cycling's Roger Kluge led the peloton across the line, 9 seconds behind the duo while points classification leader, Trek Factory Racing's Giacomo Nizzolo, finished fifth on the stage to win the red jersey. Contador finished the stage safely to win his second Giro title while Aru and Visconti also finished safely to confirm their victories in the young rider classification and the mountains classification, respectively.

Stage 21 result

	Rider	Team	Time
1	Iljo Keisse (BEL)	Etixx–Quick-Step	4h 18' 37"
2	Luke Durbridge (AUS)	Orica–GreenEDGE	+ 0"
3	Roger Kluge (GER)	IAM Cycling	+ 9"
4	Alexander Porsev (RUS)	Team Katusha	+ 9"
5	Giacomo Nizzolo (ITA)	Trek Factory Racing	+ 9"
6	Luka Mezgec (SLO)	Team Giant–Alpecin	+ 9"
7	Elia Viviani (ITA)	Team Sky	+ 9"
8	Moreno Hofland (NED)	LottoNL–Jumbo	+ 9"
9	Davide Appollonio (ITA)	Androni Giocattoli–Sidermec	+ 9"
10	Elia Favilli (ITA)	Southeast Pro Cycling	+ 9"

Final General Classification

	Rider	Team	Time
1	Alberto Contador (ESP)	Tinkoff–Saxo	88h 22' 25"
2	Fabio Aru (ITA)	Astana	+ 1' 53"
3	Mikel Landa (ESP)	Astana	+ 3' 05"
4	Andrey Amador (CRC)	Movistar Team	+ 8' 10"
5	Ryder Hesjedal (CAN)	Cannondale–Garmin	+ 9' 52"
6	Leopold König (CZE)	Team Sky	+ 10' 41"
7	Steven Kruijswijk (NED)	LottoNL–Jumbo	+ 10' 53"
8	Damiano Caruso (ITA)	BMC Racing Team	+ 12' 08"
9	Alexandre Geniez (FRA)	FDJ	+ 15' 51"
10	Yuri Trofimov (RUS)	Team Katusha	+ 16' 14"
