= 2015 Tour of Slovenia =

2015 UCI Europe Tour (2.1 race)
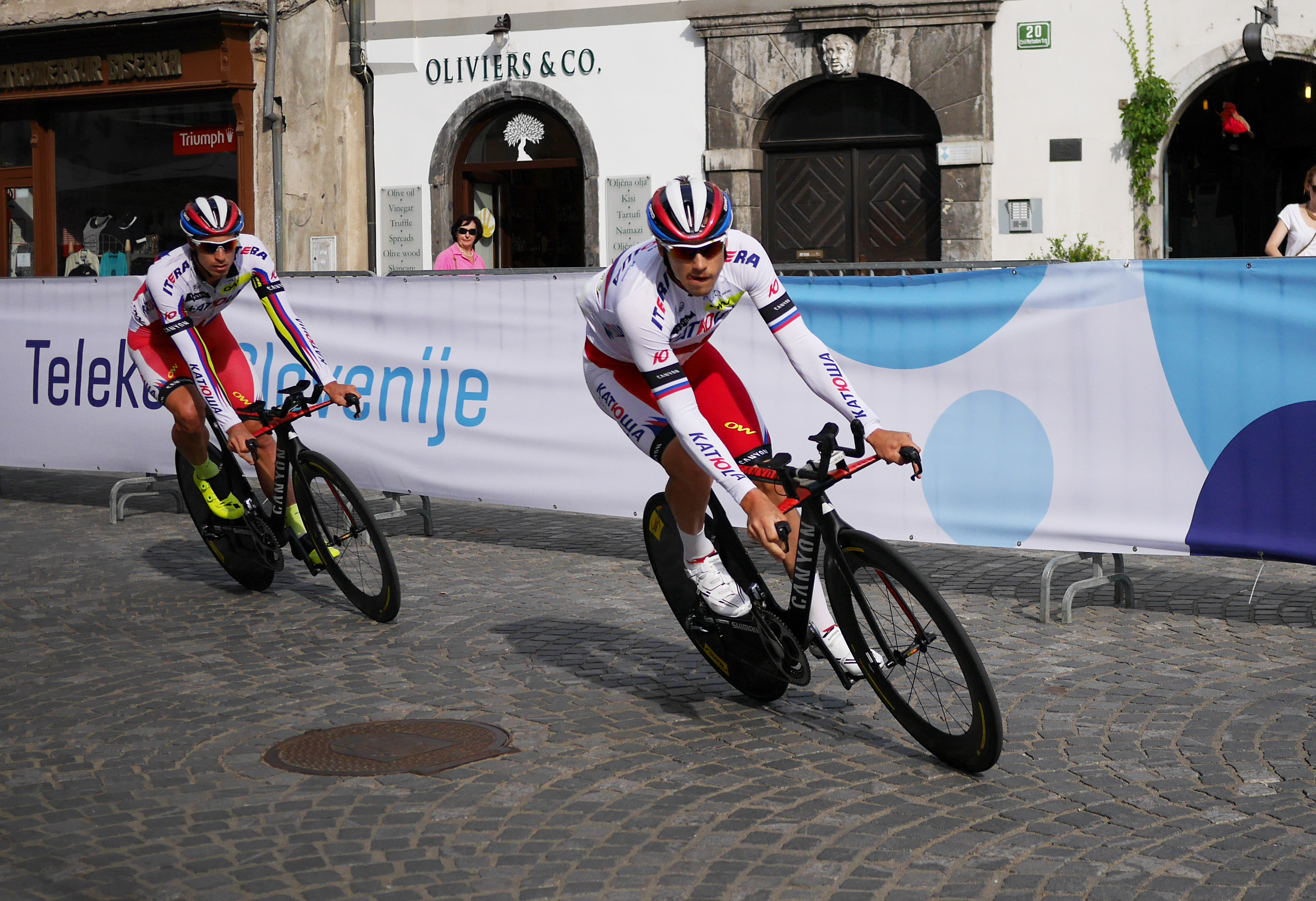
- Russian team Katusha on Stage 1 in Ljubljana

Race details
- Dates: 18–21 June
- Stages: 4
- Distance: 534.8 km (332.3 mi)
- Winning time: 13h 42' 16"

Results
| Jersey awarded to the overall winner | Winner | (Slovenia) Primož Roglič | (Adria Mobil) |
| | Second | (Spain) Mikel Nieve | (Team Sky) |
| | Third | (Slovenia) Jure Golčer | (Team Felbermayr–Simplon Wels) |
| Jersey awarded to the points classification winner | Points | (Italy) Salvatore Puccio (Note: Davide Appollonio's results were expunged following his four-year suspension for erythropoietin (EPO) later in 2015.) | (Team Sky) |
| Jersey awarded to the mountains classification winner | Mountains | (Italy) Mauro Finetto | (Southeast Pro Cycling) |
| Jersey awarded to the young rider classification winner | Young rider | (Slovenia) Domen Novak | (Adria Mobil) |
| | Team | (Slovenia) Adria Mobil | |

The 2015 Tour of Slovenia (Slovene: Dirka po Sloveniji) was the 22nd edition of the Tour of Slovenia, categorized as 2.1 stage race (UCI Europe Tour) held between 18 and 21 June 2015. Primož Roglič won the overall classification, took the race lead on the penultimate stage to the Trije Kralji Ski Resort.

The race consisted of 4 stages with 534.8 km (332.3 mi) in total.

== Teams ==
Total 128 riders (113 finished it) from 17 teams started the race.

=== UCI ProTeams ===
- (United Kingdom) Team Sky
- (Italy) Lampre–Merida
- (Russia) Team Katusha

=== UCI Professional Continental ===
- (United States) UnitedHealthcare
- (Italy) Androni Giocattoli–Sidermec
- (Italy) Nippo–Vini Fantini
- (Italy) Bardiani–CSF
- (Russia) RusVelo
- (Italy) Colombia
- (Italy) Southeast Pro Cycling
- (Belgium) Topsport Vlaanderen–Baloise

=== UCI Continental ===
- (Slovenia) Adria Mobil
- (Slovenia) Radenska–Ljubljana
- (Croatia) Meridiana–Kamen
- (Austria) Team Felbermayr–Simplon Wels
- (Italy) D'Amico–Bottecchia

=== National ===
- Slovenia

== Route and stages ==
Stage characteristics and winners
| Stage | Date | Course | Length | Type | Winner |
|---|---|---|---|---|---|
| 1 | 18 June | Ljubljana – Ljubljana | 8.8 km (5 mi) | Individual time trial | (Russia) Artem Ovechkin |
| 2 | 19 June | Škofja Loka – Kočevje | 182 km (113 mi) | Intermediate stage | (Italy) Pierpaolo De Negri |
| 3 | 20 June | Dobrovnik – Trije Kralji Ski Resort | 178.5 km (111 mi) | Mountain stage | (Slovenia) Primož Roglič |
| 4 | 21 June | Rogaška Slatina – Novo mesto | 165.5 km (103 mi) | Hilly stage | (Slovenia) Marko Kump |
| Total | | 534.8 km (332.3 mi) | | | |

=== Stage 1 ===
Salvatore Puccio (Team Sky) finished second to Artem Ovechkin (Team Katusha) on the stage.

18 June 2015 — Ljubljana to Ljubljana, 8.8 km (5.5 mi), individual time trial (ITT)

| Rank | Rider | Team | Time |
|---|---|---|---|
Official results
| 1 | (Russia) Artem Ovechkin | RusVelo | 10' 22" |
| 2 | (Italy) Salvatore Puccio | Team Sky | + 0" |
| 3 | (Italy) Diego Ulissi | Lampre–Merida | + 2" |
| 4 | (Russia) Vladimir Isaichev | Team Katusha | + 4" |
| 5 | (Russia) Alexander Porsev | Team Katusha | + 5" |
| DSQ | ~~(Italy) Davide Appollonio~~ | ~~Androni Giocattoli–Sidermec~~ | ~~+ 6"~~ |
| 6 | (Italy) Marco Canola | UnitedHealthcare | + 6" |
| 7 | (Slovenia) Jure Golčer | Team Felbermayr–Simplon Wels | + 7" |
| 8 | (Norway) Sven Erik Bystrøm | Team Katusha | + 7" |
| 9 | (Italy) Mauro Finetto | Southeast Pro Cycling | + 7" |
| 10 | (United Kingdom) Andrew Fenn | Lampre–Merida | + 9" |

=== Stage 2 ===
19 June 2015 — Škofja Loka to Kočevje, 182 km (113.1 mi)

| Rank | Rider | Team | Time |
|---|---|---|---|
Official results
| 1 | (Italy) Pierpaolo De Negri | Nippo–Vini Fantini | 4h 39' 52" |
| 2 | (Italy) Antonino Parrinello | D'Amico–Bottecchia | + 0" |
| 3 | (Italy) Simone Ponzi | Southeast Pro Cycling | + 0" |
| 4 | (Italy) Manuele Mori | Lampre–Merida | + 0" |
| 5 | (Italy) Salvatore Puccio | Team Sky | + 0" |
| DSQ | ~~(Italy) Davide Appollonio~~ | ~~Androni Giocattoli–Sidermec~~ | ~~+ 0"~~ |
| 6 | (Croatia) Radoslav Rogina | Adria Mobil | + 0" |
| 7 | (Belgium) Thomas Sprengers | Topsport Vlaanderen–Baloise | + 0" |
| 8 | (Italy) Mauro Finetto | Southeast Pro Cycling | + 0" |
| 9 | (Austria) Matthias Krizek | Team Felbermayr–Simplon Wels | + 0" |
| 10 | (Switzerland) Enea Cambianica | Lampre–Merida | + 0" |
General classification after the stage
| 1 | (Russia) Artem Ovechkin | RusVelo | 4h 50' 14" |
| 2 | (Italy) Salvatore Puccio | Team Sky | + 0" |
| 3 | (Italy) Diego Ulissi | Lampre–Merida | + 2" |
| 4 | (Russia) Vladimir Isaichev | Team Katusha | + 4" |
| DSQ | ~~(Italy) Davide Appollonio~~ | ~~Androni Giocattoli–Sidermec~~ | ~~+ 6"~~ |
| 5 | (Slovenia) Jure Golčer | Team Felbermayr–Simplon Wels | + 7" |
| 6 | (Norway) Sven Erik Bystrøm | Team Katusha | + 7" |
| 7 | (Italy) Mauro Finetto | Southeast Pro Cycling | + 7" |
| 8 | (Australia) Nathan Earle | Team Sky | + 9" |
| 9 | (Belgium) Preben Van Hecke | Topsport Vlaanderen–Baloise | + 11" |
| 10 | (Slovenia) Jan Polanc | Lampre–Merida | + 12" |

=== Stage 3 ===
20 June 2015 — Dobrovnik to Trije Kralji Ski Resort, 178.5 km (110.9 mi)

| Rank | Rider | Team | Time |
|---|---|---|---|
Official results
| 1 | (Slovenia) Primož Roglič | Adria Mobil | 5h 04' 39" |
| 2 | (Spain) Mikel Nieve | Team Sky | + 0" |
| 3 | (Croatia) Radoslav Rogina | Adria Mobil | + 0" |
| 4 | (Italy) Mauro Finetto | Southeast Pro Cycling | + 14" |
| 5 | (Slovenia) Jure Golčer | Team Felbermayr–Simplon Wels | + 14" |
| 6 | (Italy) Diego Ulissi | Lampre–Merida | + 25" |
| 7 | (Italy) Francesco Manuel Bongiorno | Bardiani–CSF | + 37" |
| 8 | (Russia) Egor Silin | Team Katusha | + 45" |
| 9 | (Russia) Alexander Foliforov | RusVelo | + 45" |
| 10 | (Croatia) Matija Kvasina | Team Felbermayr–Simplon Wels | + 45" |
General classification after the stage
| 1 | (Slovenia) Primož Roglič | Adria Mobil | 9h 55' 06" |
| 2 | (Spain) Mikel Nieve | Team Sky | + 5" |
| 3 | (Slovenia) Jure Golčer | Team Felbermayr–Simplon Wels | + 8" |
| 4 | (Italy) Mauro Finetto | Southeast Pro Cycling | + 8" |
| 5 | (Italy) Diego Ulissi | Lampre–Merida | + 14" |
| 6 | (Croatia) Radoslav Rogina | Adria Mobil | + 15" |
| 7 | (Italy) Salvatore Puccio | Team Sky | + 32" |
| 8 | (Slovenia) Jan Polanc | Lampre–Merida | + 44" |
| 9 | (Italy) Simone Stortoni | Androni Giocattoli–Sidermec | + 51" |
| 10 | (Russia) Alexander Foliforov | RusVelo | + 53" |

=== Stage 4 ===
21 June 2015 — Rogaška Slatina to Novo mesto, 165.5 km (102.8 mi)

| Rank | Rider | Team | Time |
|---|---|---|---|
Official results
| 1 | (Slovenia) Marko Kump | Adria Mobil | 3h 47' 10" |
| 2 | (Argentina) Maximiliano Richeze| | Lampre–Merida | + 0" |
| 3 | (Australia) Christopher Sutton | Team Sky | + 0" |
| DSQ | ~~(Italy) Davide Appollonio~~ | ~~Androni Giocattoli–Sidermec~~ | ~~+ 0"~~ |
| 4 | (Belgium) Jarl Salomein | Topsport Vlaanderen–Baloise | + 0" |
| 5 | (Italy) Andrea Piechele | Bardiani–CSF | + 0" |
| 6 | (Germany) Robert Förster | UnitedHealthcare | + 0" |
| 7 | (Italy) Rafael Andriato | Southeast Pro Cycling | + 0" |
| 8 | (Italy) Elia Favilli | Southeast Pro Cycling | + 0" |
| 9 | (Italy) Pierpaolo De Negri | Nippo–Vini Fantini | + 0" |
| 10 | (Italy) Federico Zurlo | UnitedHealthcare | + 0" |

== Classification leadership ==
Classification leadership by stage
| Stage | Winner | General classification | Points classification | Mountains classification | Young rider classification | Team classification |
|---|---|---|---|---|---|---|
| 1 | Artem Ovechkin | Artem Ovechkin | Artem Ovechkin | not awarded | Marko Pavlič | Team Katusha |
| 2 | Pierpaolo De Negri | Artem Ovechkin | Salvatore Puccio | Mauro Finetto | Marko Pavlič | Team Katusha |
| 3 | Primož Roglič | Primož Roglič | Salvatore Puccio | Mauro Finetto | Domen Novak | Adria Mobil |
| 4 | Marko Kump | Primož Roglič | ~~Davide Appollonio~~; Salvatore Puccio | Mauro Finetto | Domen Novak | Adria Mobil |
| Final | | Primož Roglič | Salvatore Puccio | Mauro Finetto | Domen Novak | Adria Mobil |

== Final classification standings ==
Legend
| Yellow jersey | Denotes the winner of the General classification | White jersey | Denotes the winner of the Young rider classification |
| Red jersey | Denotes the winner of the Points classification | Blue jersey | Denotes the winner of the Mountains classification |

=== General classification ===
| Rank | Rider | Team | Time |
|---|---|---|---|
| 1 | (Slovenia) Primož Roglič | Adria Mobil | 13h 42' 16" |
| 2 | (Spain) Mikel Nieve | Team Sky | + 5" |
| 3 | (Slovenia) Jure Golčer | Team Felbermayr–Simplon Wels | + 8" |
| 4 | (Italy) Mauro Finetto | Southeast Pro Cycling | + 8" |
| 5 | (Italy) Diego Ulissi | Lampre–Merida | + 14" |
| 6 | (Croatia) Radoslav Rogina | Adria Mobil | + 15" |
| 7 | (Italy) Salvatore Puccio | Team Sky | + 32" |
| 8 | (Slovenia) Jan Polanc | Lampre–Merida | + 44" |
| 9 | (Italy) Simone Stortoni | Androni Giocattoli–Sidermec | + 51" |
| 10 | (Russia) Alexander Foliforov | RusVelo | + 53" |

=== Points classification ===
| Rank | Rider | Team | Points |
|---|---|---|---|
| DSQ | ~~(Italy) Davide Appollonio~~ | ~~Androni Giocattoli–Sidermec~~ | ~~42~~ |
| 1 | (Italy) Salvatore Puccio | Team Sky | 41 |
| 2 | (Italy) Pierpaolo De Negri | Nippo–Vini Fantini | 31 |
| 3 | (Italy) Mauro Finetto | Southeast Pro Cycling | 27 |
| 4 | (Italy) Diego Ulissi | Lampre–Merida | 26 |
| 5 | (Slovenia) Primož Roglič | Adria Mobil | 25 |
| 6 | (Croatia) Radoslav Rogina | Adria Mobil | 25 |
| 7 | (Russia) Artem Ovechkin | RusVelo | 25 |
| 8 | (Slovenia) Marko Kump | Adria Mobil | 25 |
| 9 | (Italy) Antonino Parrinello | D'Amico–Bottecchia | 23 |
| 10 | (Argentina) Maximiliano Richeze | Lampre–Merida | 22 |

=== Mountains classification ===
| Rank | Rider | Team | Points |
|---|---|---|---|
| 1 | (Italy) Mauro Finetto | Southeast Pro Cycling | 23 |
| 2 | (Slovenia) Primož Roglič | Adria Mobil | 12 |
| 3 | (Slovenia) Klemen Štimulak | Adria Mobil | 12 |
| 4 | (Italy) Gianfranco Zilioli | Androni Giocattoli–Sidermec | 9 |
| 5 | (Belgium) Jarl Salomein | Topsport Vlaanderen–Baloise | 9 |
| 6 | (Spain) Mikel Nieve | Team Sky | 8 |
| 7 | (Colombia) Alex Cano | Colombia | 8 |
| 8 | (Italy) Francesco Gavazzi | Southeast Pro Cycling | 8 |
| 9 | (Croatia) Radoslav Rogina | Adria Mobil | 6 |
| 10 | (Italy) Simone Stortoni | Androni Giocattoli–Sidermec | 4 |

=== Young rider classification ===
| Rank | Rider | Team | Points |
|---|---|---|---|
| 1 | (Slovenia) Domen Novak | Adria Mobil | 13h 43' 56" |
| 2 | (Russia) Artem Nych | RusVelo | + 3' 59" |
| 3 | (Russia) Ildar Arslanov | RusVelo | + 6' 31" |
| 4 | (Slovenia) Marko Pavlič | Radenska–Ljubljana | + 7' 46" |
| 5 | (Slovenia) Žiga Grošelj | Slovenia | + 16' 36" |
| 6 | (Slovenia) Gašper Katrašnik | Slovenia | + 29' 29" |
| 7 | (Italy) Federico Zurlo | UnitedHealthcare | + 32' 04" |
| 8 | (Slovenia) Žiga Ručigaj | Radenska–Ljubljana | + 32' 21" |
| 9 | (Colombia) Edward Díaz | Colombia | + 32' 22" |
| 10 | (Colombia) Carlos Ramírez | Colombia | + 37' 14" |

=== Teams classification ===
| Rank | Team | Time |
|---|---|---|
| 1 | (Slovenia) Adria Mobil | 41h 08' 15" |
| 2 | (United Kingdom) Team Sky | + 31" |
| 3 | (Italy) Androni Giocattoli–Sidermec | + 2' 34" |
| 4 | (Russia) RusVelo | + 6' 37" |
| 5 | (Italy) Southeast Pro Cycling | + 10' 47" |
| 6 | (Italy) Lampre–Merida | + 12' 35" |
| 7 | (Austria) Team Felbermayr–Simplon Wels | + 20' 42" |
| 8 | (Italy) Bardiani–CSF | + 22' 41" |
| 9 | (Italy) Nippo–Vini Fantini | + 29' 00" |
| 10 | (Belgium) Topsport Vlaanderen–Baloise | + 31' 08" |
