= Trije Kralji Ski Resort =

Ski resort in Slovenia

- Interactive map of Trije Kralji Ski Resort
- Location: Planina pod Šumnikom; South-Western Pohorje; Slovenia
- Nearest city: Slovenska Bistrica
- Coordinates: 46.4382°N 15.4598°E
- Vertical: 164 m (538 ft)
- Top elevation: 1,344 m (4,409 ft)
- Base elevation: 1,180 m (3,870 ft)
- Skiable area: 70 acres (0.28 km^{2})
- Trails: Total 1,5 km 0,5 km 1 km
- Longest run: 1 km (0.62 mi)
- Lift system: 2 total 2 surface
- Snowmaking: yes
- Website: jakec-sp.si

Trije Kralji Ski Resort is a Slovenian family ski resort located in western part of Pohorje mountain in municipality of Slovenska Bistrica. It's 18 km away from closest city Slovenska Bistrica.

Resort has two slopes, two lifts and together 1,5 km of skiing terrain and 4 km of cross-country skiing. There are plans to build a new chair-lift and two new slopes.

== Ski slopes ==
| Name | Length | Category |
|---|---|---|
| Črno Jezero | 2 x 450m | easy |
| Veliki Vrh | 2 x 950m | intermediate |
