= Riccardo Stacchiotti =

Italian cyclist

- Stacchiotti in 2026

Personal information
- Full name: Riccardo Stacchiotti
- Born: 8 November 1991 (age 35) Recanati, Italy
- Height: 1.79 m (5 ft 10 in)
- Weight: 70 kg (154 lb)

Cycling career
- Sport: Cycling
- Current team: Retired
- Discipline: Road
- Role: Rider

Amateur teams
- 2010–2012: Reda Mokador
- 2013: Vini Fantini–D'Angelo & Antenucci–Kyklos

Professional teams
- 2013: Team Nippo–De Rosa (stagiaire)
- 2014–2017: Vini Fantini–Nippo
- 2018–2019: MsTina–Focus
- 2020–2021: Vini Zabù–KTM

Riccardo Stacchiotti (born 8 November 1991) is an Italian former professional racing cyclist. He rode in the Giro d'Italia in 2015 and 2016.

== Major results ==
2013
8th Gran Premio della Liberazione
2014
1st Mountains classification Tour of Estonia
10th GP Izola
2015
1st Overall Tour de Hokkaido

1st Stages 1 & 3

5th Overall Tour of China II
9th Overall Tour of China I
2016
2nd Overall Tour of China II
2018
Tour of Bihor

1st Points classification
1st Stage 3

Volta a Portugal

1st Stages 1 & 5

1st Stage 4 GP Nacional 2 de Portugal
2019
Sibiu Cycling Tour

1st Points classification
1st Stage 4

1st Points classification Ronde de l'Oise
1st Stage 1 Giro di Sicilia
4th Trofej Umag
8th Poreč Trophy
9th Coppa Bernocchi

=== Grand Tour general classification results timeline ===
Grand Tour	2015	2016
Giro d'Italia	152	155
Tour de France	—	—
Vuelta a España	—	—

Legend
—	Did not compete
DNF	Did not finish
