= Antonio Viola =

Italian cyclist

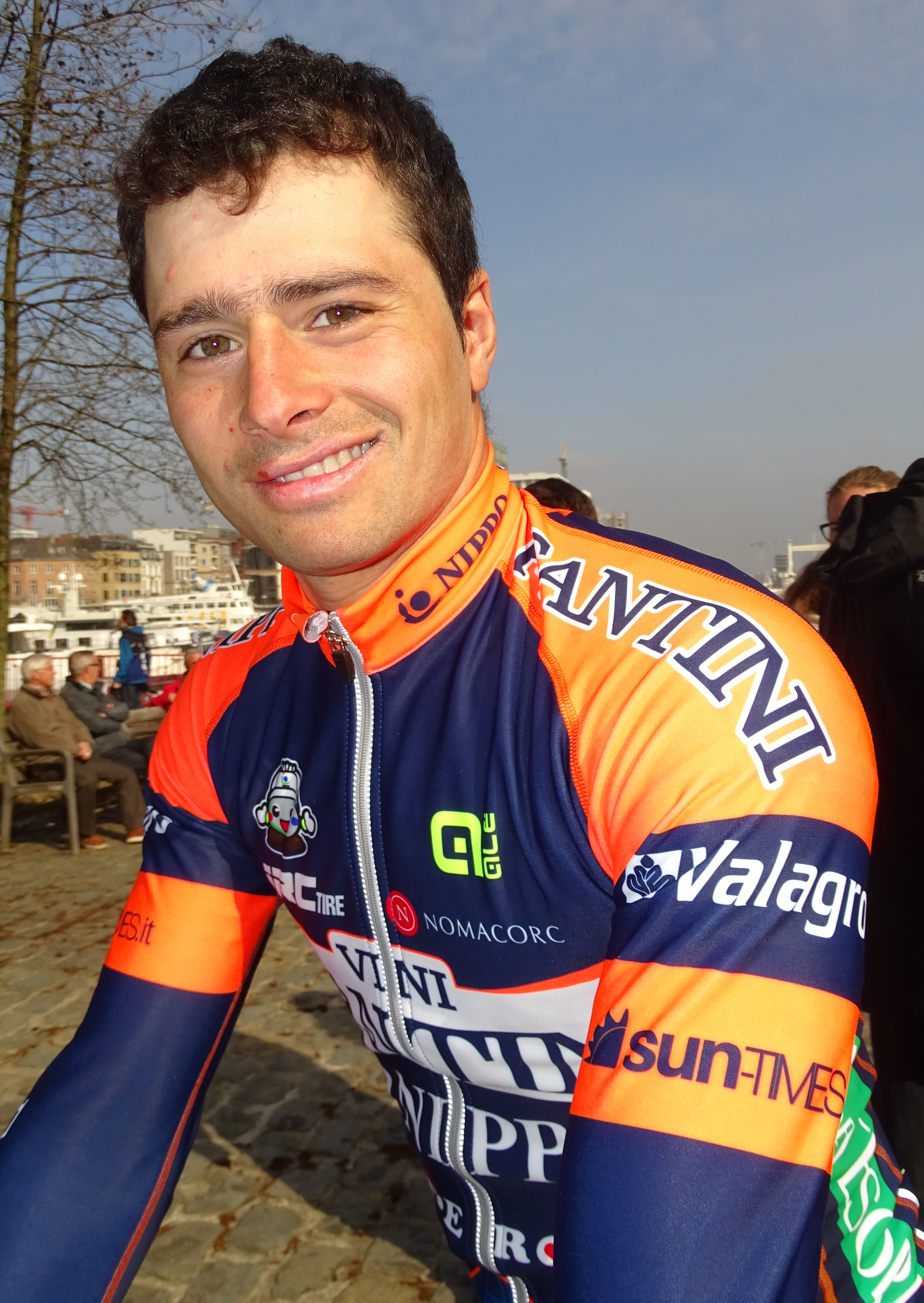

Personal information
- Born: 21 September 1990 (age 36) Potenza, Italy

Cycling career
- Sport: Cycling
- Current team: Vini Fantini-Nippo
- Discipline: Road
- Role: Rider

Professional teams
- 2012: Farnese Vini–Selle Italia (stagiaire)
- 2014-: Vini Fantini-Nippo

Antonio Viola (born 21 September 1990 in Potenza) is an Italian cyclist riding for Nippo–Vini Fantini.
