= Didier Chaparro =

Colombian cyclist

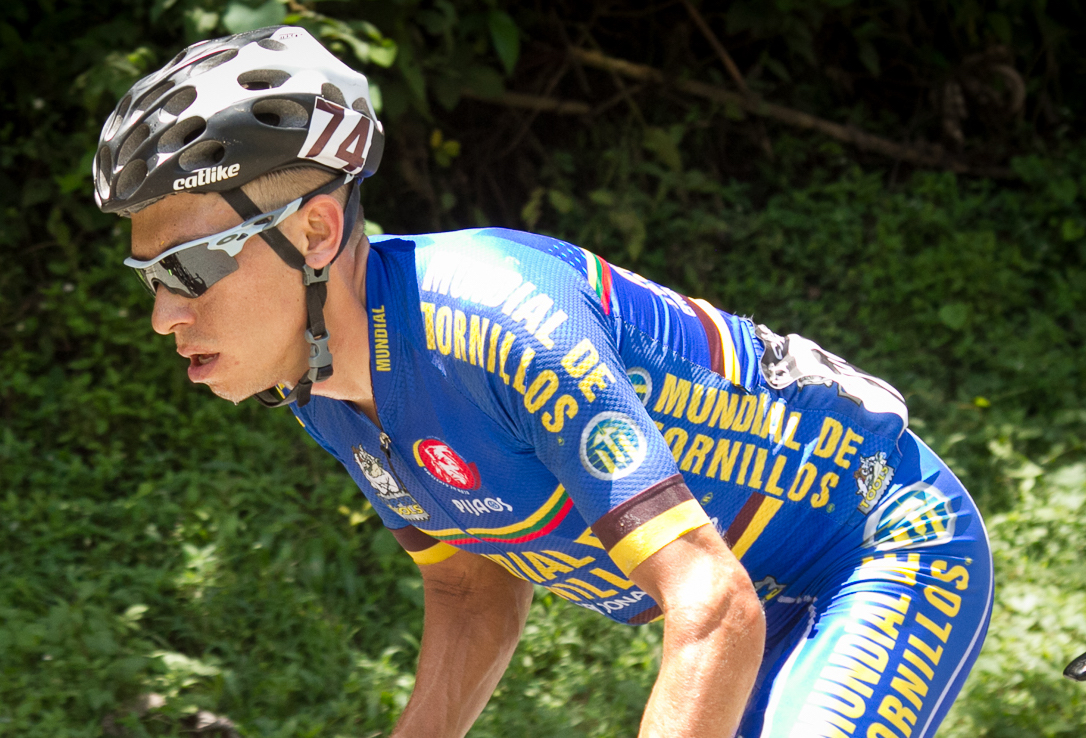
- Chaparro at the 2016 Clásico RCN

Personal information
- Full name: Didier Alonso Chaparro López
- Born: July 7, 1987 (age 39) Colombia
- Height: 1.65 m (5 ft 5 in)
- Weight: 54 kg (119 lb)

Cycling career
- Sport: Cycling
- Discipline: Road
- Role: Rider

Amateur teams
- 2007: Indeportes Antioquia
- 2009: GW–Shimano
- 2010: Chaoyang–ESSA
- 2011: GW–Shimano
- 2014–2015: Fuerzas Armadas–Ejército Nacional
- 2016–2017: Mundial de Tornillos–PijaosWeb
- 2018: Supergiros
- 2021: Equipo Continental Supergiros

Professional teams
- 2012–2013: Coldeportes–Comcel
- 2015: Nippo–Vini Fantini
- 2019–2020: Orgullo Paisa

Didier Alonso Chaparro López (born 7 July 1987) is a Colombian cyclist, who most recently rode for Colombian amateur team Equipo Continental Supergiros.

== Major results ==
2009
1st Stage 4 Clásico RCN
2012
4th Overall Vuelta Ciclista de Chile
2015
7th Overall Tour of Japan
2018
1st Overall Vuelta a Chiriquí
3rd Overall Clásico RCN

1st Stage 7
