= Daniele Colli =

Italian professional road racing cyclist

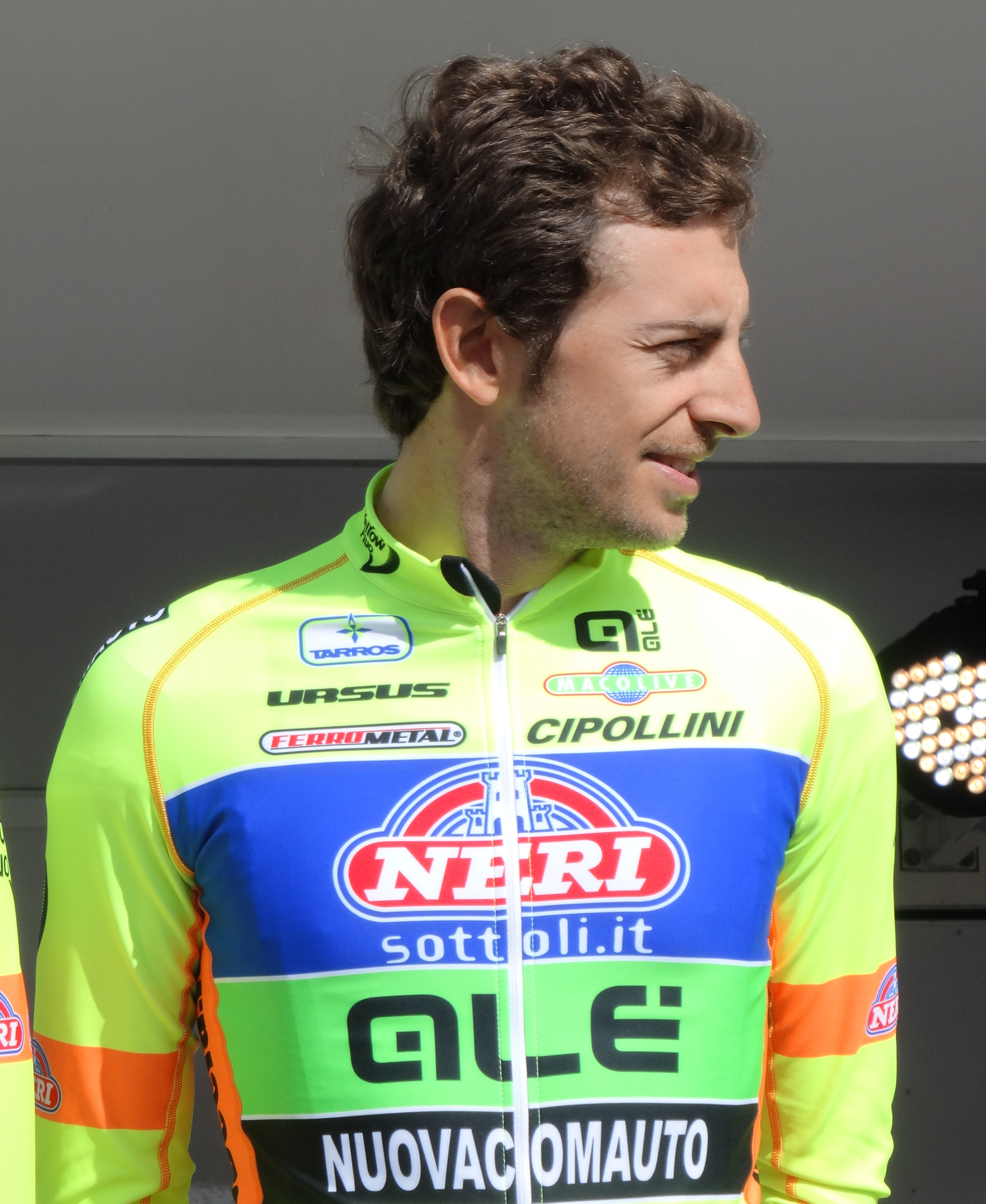
- Colli in 2014

Personal information
- Full name: Daniele Colli
- Born: April 19, 1982 (age 44) Rho, Lombardy, Italy
- Height: 1.79 m (5 ft 10 in)
- Weight: 73 kg (161 lb)

Cycling career
- Sport: Cycling
- Current team: Retired
- Discipline: Road
- Role: Rider

Professional teams
- 2005–2006: Liquigas–Bianchi
- 2007: Ceramica Panaria–Navigare
- 2008: P-Nívó Betonexpressz 2000 Corratec
- 2009: Carmiooro A Style
- 2010: Ceramica Flaminia
- 2011: Geox–TMC
- 2012: Team Type 1–Sanofi
- 2013–2014: Vini Fantini–Selle Italia
- 2015–2016: Nippo–Vini Fantini
- 2017: Qinghai Tianyoude Cycling Team

Daniele Colli (born April 19, 1982) is an Italian former professional road racing cyclist, who rode professionally between 2005 and 2017.

On 14 May 2015, during the Stage 6 of the Giro d'Italia, Colli broke his arm following a collision with spectator.

== Major results ==
1999
1st Road race, National Junior Road Championships
2000
8th Time trial, UCI Junior Road World Championships
2003
10th Trofeo Banca Popolare di Vicenza
2004
1st Gran Premio della Liberazione
1st Trofeo Alcide Degasperi
2nd Coppa Citta' di Asti
5th Coppa della Pace
7th Trofeo Franco Balestra
2006
2nd Down Under Classic
8th Gran Premio della Costa Etruschi
2008
6th Overall Tour of Szeklerland

1st Stage 3

2009
3rd Memorial Cimurri
5th Giro del Mendrisiotto
5th Giro della Romagna
6th Overall Tour of Hainan
6th Neuseen Classics
6th Gran Premio Città di Camaiore
7th Polynormande
8th Trophée des Grimpeurs
8th GP Kranj
2010
3rd Gran Premio Industria e Commercio Artigianato Carnaghese
4th Classica Sarda
4th Rund um Köln
4th Coppa Bernocchi
4th GP Nobili Rubinetterie – Coppa Città di Stresa
5th Grand Prix Pino Cerami
5th Ronde van Drenthe
5th Grand Prix de Denain
8th Memorial Rik Van Steenbergen
10th Overall Circuit de Lorraine
10th Gran Premio Città di Camaiore
2011
7th Gran Premio Industria e Commercio di Prato
8th Overall Danmark Rundt
8th GP Nobili Rubinetterie – Coppa Città di Stresa
8th Paris–Brussels
10th Gran Premio Industria e Commercio Artigianato Carnaghese
2012
1st Stage 8 Tour of Austria
2nd Overall Giro della Provincia di Reggio Calabria
3rd Dwars door Drenthe
4th Philadelphia International Cycling Classic
7th Rogaland GP
2013
5th Coppa Bernocchi
2014
3rd Grand Prix Pino Cerami
4th Volta Limburg Classic
2015
1st Overall Tour of China I

1st Stage 4

2nd Overall Tour de Hokkaido

1st Points classification
1st Stage 2

5th Kuurne–Brussels–Kuurne
2016
1st Points classification Tour of Qinghai Lake
