= Manabu Ishibashi =

Japanese cyclist

Personal information
- Full name: Manabu Ishibashi; Japanese: 石橋 学
- Born: 30 November 1992 (age 33) Sannohe, Aomori, Japan
- Height: 1.77 m (5 ft 10 in)
- Weight: 68 kg (150 lb)

Cycling career
- Sport: Cycling
- Current team: Team UKYO
- Discipline: Road
- Role: Rider

Amateur team
- 2021: Ciel Bleu Kanoya

Professional teams
- 2012: Team UKYO (stagiaire)
- 2013–2016: Team Nippo–De Rosa
- 2017–2020: Bridgestone–Anchor
- 2022–: Team UKYO

Manabu Ishibashi (石橋 学, Ishibashi Manabu; born 30 November 1992) is a Japanese racing cyclist, who currently rides for UCI Continental team Team UKYO.

== Career ==
He joined Team Nippo–De Rosa starting in the 2013 season while he was still a student at the National Institute of Fitness and Sports in Kanoya. He won the Under-23 Japanese National Time Trial Championships in 2014. He stayed on with Nippo–Vini Fantini as it became a Professional Continental team starting in the 2015 season.

Ishibashi became the sixth Japanese cyclist to participate in the Giro d'Italia when he rode in the 2015 edition. He withdrew from the race on the 9th stage. He transferred to Bridgestone–Anchor for the 2017 season.

== Major results ==
2014
1st Time trial, National Under-23 Road Championships
Asian Under-23 Road Championships

7th Time trial
9th Road race

2019
4th Tour de Okinawa
7th Overall Tour of Japan
2024
1st Best Asian rider classification Tour de Langkawi
