= Pierpaolo De Negri =

Italian road racing cyclist

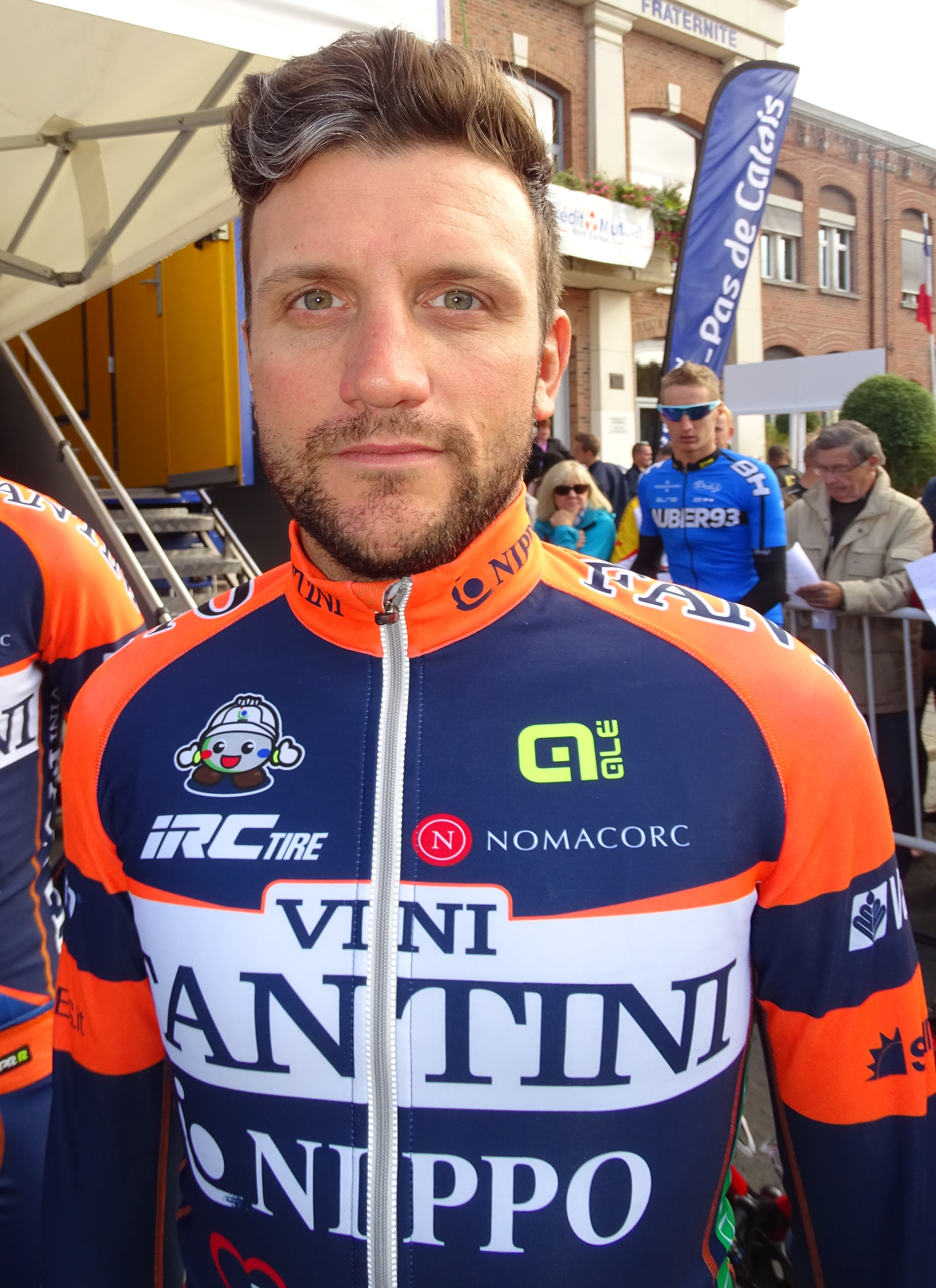
- De Negri at the 2015 Grand Prix de Fourmies.

Personal information
- Full name: Pierpaolo De Negri
- Born: 5 June 1986 (age 40) Genoa, Italy
- Height: 1.7 m (5 ft 7 in)
- Weight: 61 kg (134 lb)

Cycling career
- Sport: Cycling
- Discipline: Road
- Role: Rider

Amateur teams
- 2006: Palazzago
- 2007–2009: Finauto Neri Lucchini Zoccorinese

Professional teams
- 2009: ISD–NERI (stagiaire)
- 2010–2013: ISD–NERI
- 2014–2017: Vini Fantini–Nippo
- 2018: MsTina–Focus

Major wins
- Trofeo Matteotti (2012)

Pierpaolo De Negri (born 5 June 1986) is an Italian professional road bicycle racer, who most recently rode for UCI Continental team MsTina–Focus. During his career, De Negri has also served a doping suspension, after testing positive for anabolic–androgenic steroids (AAS).

== Career ==
Born in Genoa, De Negri has competed as a professional since the start of the 2010 season, joining the ISD–NERI team full-time after a stagiaire contract with the team in the second half of 2009. In July 2012, De Negri took his first victory for the team, by winning the Trofeo Matteotti race in Italy in a sprint of 25 riders.

De Negri left Vini Fantini–Selle Italia at the end of the 2013 season, and joined Vini Fantini–Nippo for the 2014 season. He remained with the team until the end of 2017, when he joined the new MsTina–Focus team.

== Doping ==
On 21 December 2017, De Negri tested positive for anabolic androgenic steroids. In November 2019, De Negri was given a four-year ban – backdated to February 2018, when the positive test was announced.

== Major results ==
2006
9th GP Città di Felino
2007
1st Trofeo Martiri del 4 e 11 Luglio 1944
2nd Gran Premio Somma
2nd Milano–Rapallo
2nd Giro del Casentino
3rd Gran Premio Autodromo di Monza
3rd Memorial Armenio Armanasco
3rd Trofeo Pedalata Elettrica – Memorial Gino Bartali
4th Giro Nazionale del Valdarno
5th Trofeo G.S. Gavardo Tecmor
6th Trofeo Alcide Degasperi
2008
1st Giro del Casentino
1st Gran Premio Somma
1st Trofeo Alvaro Bacci
1st Giro del Valdarno
1st Coppa A.C. Capannolese
1st Firenze–Empoli
2nd Coppa del Mobilio
2nd Coppa Guinigi
2nd Trofeo Tempestini Ledo
3rd ZLM Tour
3rd Giro del Belvedere
3rd Trofeo di Autunno
3rd Trofeo Comune di Lamporecchio
4th Trofeo Rusconi
4th Memorial Pigoni & Coli
4th Firenze–Viareggio
4th Coppa Giulio Burci
4th Trofeo delle Colline Capannoresi
4th Trofeo Caduti di Soprazocco
5th Gran Premio Sagra della Pizza
2009
1st GP La Torre
1st Coppa Giulio Burci
1st Coppa Caduti
1st Coppa Cicogna
2nd GP Montanino
2nd Giro del Compitese
3rd Trofeo Edil C
3rd Firenze–Empoli
3rd Pistoia–Fiorano
3rd GP Comune di Cerreto Guidi
3rd Coppa del Mobilio
4th Trofeo Franco Balestra
4th Piccola Sanremo
4th Memorial Angelo Fumagalli
4th Coppa Penna
5th GP Città di Valeggio
5th Giro delle Due Province
5th Firenze–Viareggio
6th Trofeo delle Colline Capannoresi
6th Coppa Fiera di Mercatale
6th Parma–La Spezia
7th Circuito Internazionale di Caneva
7th Gran Premio Cuoio e Pelli
8th Trofeo Città di Brescia
8th Coppa del Mobilio – Time Trial
10th Trofeo Comune di Lamporecchio
2010
5th Memorial Marco Pantani
8th Coppa Bernocchi
2011
5th Gran Premio Nobili Rubinetterie – Coppa Città di Stresa
8th Grote Prijs Jef Scherens
2012
1st Trofeo Matteotti
2013
Tour of Japan

1st Points classification
1st Stage 3

7th Grand Prix Pino Cerami
7th Giro dell'Appennino
7th Coppa Sabatini
2014
1st Stage 1 Circuit des Ardennes
1st Stage 3 Tour of Japan
8th Overall Tour of Estonia
2015
1st Stage 2 Tour of Slovenia
9th Gran Premio Bruno Beghelli
2016
1st Points classification Tour of Japan
2nd Overall Tour de Hokkaido

1st Points classification
1st Stage 3

2017
4th Omloop Mandel-Leie-Schelde
8th Overall Tour de Hokkaido
8th Grand Prix of Aargau Canton

=== Grand Tour general classification results timeline ===
Grand Tour	2012	2013	2014	2015
Giro d'Italia	120	—	—	108
Tour de France	—	—	—	—
Vuelta a España	—	—	—	—

Legend
—	Did not compete
DNF	Did not finish
