= Giacomo Berlato =

Italian bicycle racer (born 1992)

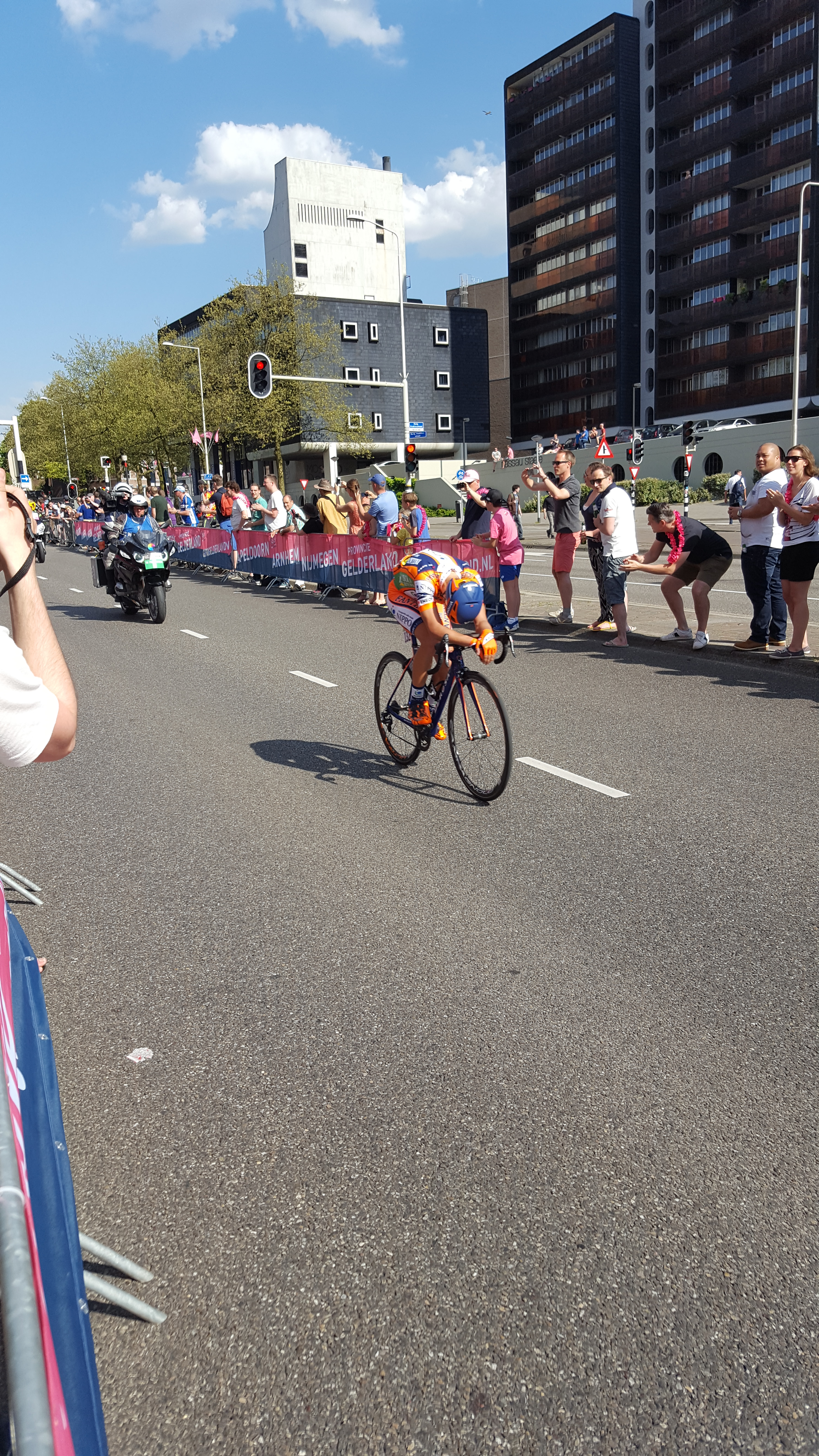
- Berlato at the 2016 Giro d'Italia

Personal information
- Full name: Giacomo Berlato
- Born: 5 February 1992 (age 34) Schio, Italy
- Height: 1.69 m (5 ft 7 in)
- Weight: 60 kg (132 lb)

Cycling career
- Sport: Cycling
- Disciplines: Road; Mountain biking
- Role: Rider

Amateur teams
- 2011: Mantovani Cicli Fontana
- 2012–2014: Zalf–Euromobil–Désirée–Fior
- 2019: Team Bike Innovation Focus Rosti

Professional teams
- 2015–2017: Nippo–Vini Fantini
- 2018: MsTina–Focus

Giacomo Berlato (born 5 February 1992) is an Italian professional racing cyclist, who last rode in mountain biking for Italian amateur team Bike Innovation Focus Rosti. In road racing, Berlato was named in the start list for the 2016 Giro d'Italia.

== Major results ==
2010
3rd Overall Giro della Lunigiana

1st Stage 2

2013
5th Giro del Medio Brenta
2014
1st Trofeo Città di San Vendemiano
1st Ruota d'Oro
9th Trofeo Banca Popolare di Vicenza
2016
4th Overall Tour de Korea
8th Overall Sibiu Cycling Tour
2017
4th Overall Tour de Hokkaido

=== Grand Tour general classification results timeline ===
Grand Tour	2015	2016
Giro d'Italia	101	DNF
Tour de France	—	—
Vuelta a España	—	—

Legend
—	Did not compete
DNF	Did not finish
