= List of teams and cyclists in the 2015 Giro d'Italia =

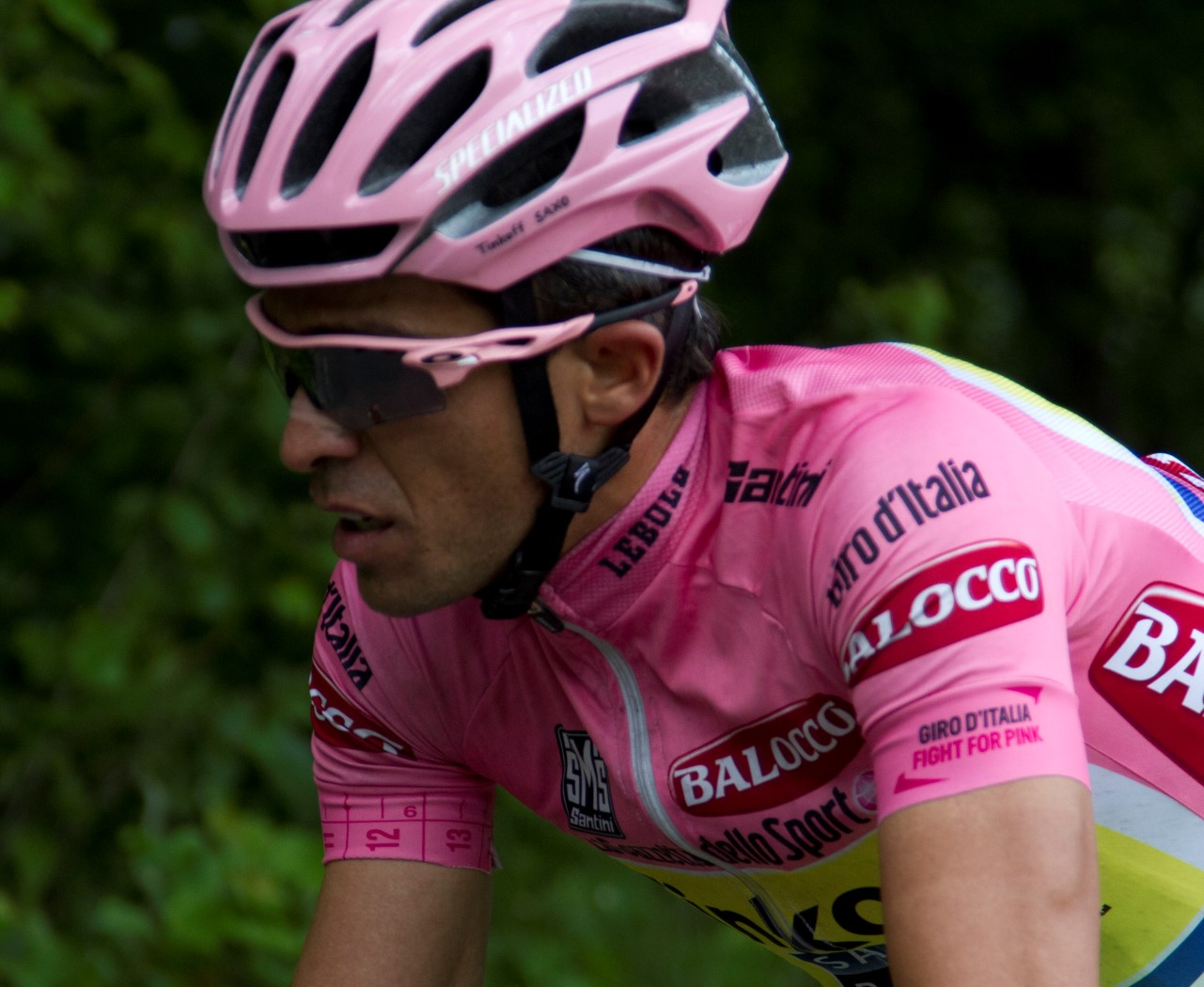
Alberto Contador, winner of the 2015 Giro d'Italia, wearing the leader's pink jersey.

The number of riders per nation participated in the 2015 Giro d'Italia: 20+ / 10–19 / 2–9 / 1

The 2015 Giro d'Italia was the first of cycling's Grand Tours to take place in the 2015 road cycling season. It was the 98th edition of the Giro d'Italia. The race started on 9 May in San Lorenzo al Mare and ended on 31 May in Milan. Although it took place principally in Italy, the route also led the riders into Switzerland.

The 17 UCI WorldTeams were automatically invited and obliged to attend the race. In October 2014, five UCI Professional Continental teams were awarded wildcard places in the race by RCS Sport, the organisers of the Giro, to complete the 22-team peloton. As there were nine men in each team, the initial startlist consisted of 198 riders. However, as LottoNL–Jumbo's George Bennett was forced to withdraw before the race start due to a blood test that revealed a low level of cortisol, only 197 riders started the first stage. These came from 36 countries; more than a quarter of the peloton (59 riders) were Italian, while no other nation had more than 15 riders participating in the race.

The final stage in Milan was completed by 163 riders, with 34 failing to finish the race. The race was won by Alberto Contador (riding for the Tinkoff–Saxo team). Contador wore the general classification leader's pink jersey for the first time on stage 5, the race's first summit finish. He maintained the lead for several days, despite injuring his shoulder in a crash on stage 6. Contador lost the lead to Fabio Aru (Astana) on stage 13 after being held up in another crash, but regained it the following day, when he beat his rivals by several minutes in the race's only individual time trial. Despite coming under pressure from Aru and his teammate Mikel Landa in the final week of racing, Contador preserved his lead to the end of the Giro. Aru finished second, nearly two minutes behind Contador, and won the young rider classification; Landa completed the podium, more than a minute behind Aru. The points classification was won by Giacomo Nizzolo (Trek Factory Racing), while the mountains classification was won by Giovanni Visconti (Movistar Team). Astana won both team classifications.

== Teams ==
All 17 UCI WorldTeams were automatically invited and were obliged to attend the race. As the winners of the 2014 Coppa Italia rankings for Italian teams, Southeast Pro Cycling – who competed as Neri Sottoli in 2014 – were provisionally invited to the race in October 2014. In January 2015, their entry was officially confirmed with the announcement of the five wildcard places, which completed the 22-team peloton. The other wildcard places were awarded to the Androni Giocattoli–Sidermec, Bardiani–CSF, CCC–Sprandi–Polkowice and Nippo–Vini Fantini squads.

The 22 teams that competed in the race were:

UCI WorldTeams

- Astana (riders)
- AG2R La Mondiale (riders)
- FDJ (riders)
- Team Sky (riders)
- Tinkoff–Saxo (riders)
- Movistar Team (riders)
- BMC Racing Team (riders)
- Lotto–Soudal (riders)
- Team Giant–Alpecin (riders)
- Team Katusha (riders)
- Orica–GreenEDGE (riders)
- Etixx–Quick-Step (riders)
- LottoNL–Jumbo (riders)
- Trek Factory Racing (riders)
- Lampre–Merida (riders)
- Cannondale–Garmin (riders)
- IAM Cycling (riders)

UCI Professional Continental teams

- Androni Giocattoli–Sidermec (riders)
- Bardiani–CSF (riders)
- CCC–Sprandi–Polkowice (riders)
- Nippo–Vini Fantini (riders)
- Southeast Pro Cycling (riders)

== Cyclists ==
Legend
| No. | Starting number worn by the rider during the Giro |
| Pos. | Position in the general classification |
| Time | Deficit to the winner of the general classification |
| † | Denotes riders born on or after 1 January 1990 eligible for the young rider classification |
| General classification | Denotes the winner of the general classification |
| Points classification | Denotes the winner of the points classification |
| Mountains classification | Denotes the winner of the mountains classification |
| Young rider classification | Denotes the winner of the young rider classification (eligibility indicated by †) |
| HD | Denotes a rider who failed to finish within the time limit, followed by the stage in which this occurred |
| DNS | Denotes a rider who did not start, followed by the stage before which he withdrew |
| DNF | Denotes a rider who did not finish, followed by the stage in which he withdrew |
Age correct as of 9 May 2015, the date on which the Giro began

=== By starting number ===
| No. | Name | Nationality | Team | Age | Pos. | Time | Ref. |
|---|---|---|---|---|---|---|---|
| 1 | Domenico Pozzovivo | Italy | AG2R La Mondiale | 32 | DNF-3 | — | |
| 2 | Julien Bérard | France | AG2R La Mondiale | 27 | 105 | + 4h 42' 01" | |
| 3 | Carlos Betancur | Colombia | AG2R La Mondiale | 25 | 20 | + 1h 17' 27" | |
| 4 | Axel Domont † | France | AG2R La Mondiale | 24 | 75 | + 3h 40' 42" | |
| 5 | Hubert Dupont | France | AG2R La Mondiale | 34 | 42 | + 2h 44' 08" | |
| 6 | Patrick Gretsch | Germany | AG2R La Mondiale | 28 | 94 | + 4h 25' 13" | |
| 7 | Hugo Houle † | Canada | AG2R La Mondiale | 24 | 113 | + 4h 54' 57" | |
| 8 | Matteo Montaguti | Italy | AG2R La Mondiale | 31 | 54 | + 3h 01' 35" | |
| 9 | Rinaldo Nocentini | Italy | AG2R La Mondiale | 37 | 73 | + 3h 36' 24" | |
| 11 | Franco Pellizotti | Italy | Androni Giocattoli–Sidermec | 37 | 24 | + 1h 30' 49" | |
| 12 | Davide Appollonio | Italy | Androni Giocattoli–Sidermec | 25 | 123 | + 5h 11' 20" | |
| 13 | Marco Bandiera | Italy | Androni Giocattoli–Sidermec | 30 | 155 | + 6h 06' 50" | |
| 14 | Tiziano Dall'Antonia | Italy | Androni Giocattoli–Sidermec | 31 | HD-5 | — | |
| 15 | Marco Frapporti | Italy | Androni Giocattoli–Sidermec | 30 | 98 | + 4h 33' 17" | |
| 16 | Oscar Gatto | Italy | Androni Giocattoli–Sidermec | 30 | DNS-15 | — | |
| 17 | Simone Stortoni | Italy | Androni Giocattoli–Sidermec | 29 | 50 | + 2h 51' 48" | |
| 18 | Serghei Țvetcov | Romania | Androni Giocattoli–Sidermec | 26 | 139 | + 5h 35' 03" | |
| 19 | Gianfranco Zilioli † | Italy | Androni Giocattoli–Sidermec | 25 | 71 | + 3h 34' 29" | |
| 21 | Fabio Aru † | Italy | Astana | 24 | 2 | + 1' 53" | |
| 22 | Dario Cataldo | Italy | Astana | 30 | 25 | + 1h 35' 24" | |
| 23 | Tanel Kangert | Estonia | Astana | 28 | 13 | + 28' 05" | |
| 24 | Mikel Landa | Spain | Astana | 25 | 3 | + 3' 05" | |
| 25 | Davide Malacarne | Italy | Astana | 27 | 85 | + 4h 04' 18" | |
| 26 | Diego Rosa | Italy | Astana | 26 | 23 | + 1h 24' 57" | |
| 27 | Luis León Sánchez | Spain | Astana | 31 | 35 | + 2h 17' 30" | |
| 28 | Paolo Tiralongo | Italy | Astana | 37 | 19 | + 1h 03' 38" | |
| 29 | Andrey Zeits | Kazakhstan | Astana | 28 | 59 | + 3h 09' 32" | |
| 31 | Francesco Manuel Bongiorno † | Italy | Bardiani–CSF | 24 | 60 | + 3h 12' 36" | |
| 32 | Enrico Barbin † | Italy | Bardiani–CSF | 25 | DNF-17 | — | |
| 33 | Enrico Battaglin | Italy | Bardiani–CSF | 25 | DNF-19 | — | |
| 34 | Nicola Boem | Italy | Bardiani–CSF | 25 | 159 | + 6h 10' 26" | |
| 35 | Luca Chirico † | Italy | Bardiani–CSF | 22 | 88 | + 4h 16' 30" | |
| 36 | Sonny Colbrelli † | Italy | Bardiani–CSF | 24 | 100 | + 4h 34' 27" | |
| 37 | Stefano Pirazzi | Italy | Bardiani–CSF | 28 | 22 | + 1h 21' 38" | |
| 38 | Nicola Ruffoni † | Italy | Bardiani–CSF | 24 | DNF-15 | — | |
| 39 | Edoardo Zardini | Italy | Bardiani–CSF | 25 | 82 | + 4h 00' 50" | |
| 41 | Philippe Gilbert | Belgium | BMC Racing Team | 32 | 39 | + 2h 30' 21" | |
| 42 | Darwin Atapuma | Colombia | BMC Racing Team | 27 | 16 | + 40' 36" | |
| 43 | Brent Bookwalter | United States | BMC Racing Team | 31 | 66 | + 3h 21' 47" | |
| 44 | Marcus Burghardt | Germany | BMC Racing Team | 31 | 70 | + 3h 33' 49" | |
| 45 | Damiano Caruso | Italy | BMC Racing Team | 27 | 8 | + 12' 08" | |
| 46 | Silvan Dillier † | Switzerland | BMC Racing Team | 24 | 52 | + 2h 53' 04" | |
| 47 | Stefan Küng † | Switzerland | BMC Racing Team | 21 | DNF-12 | — | |
| 48 | Amaël Moinard | France | BMC Racing Team | 33 | 15 | + 30' 35" | |
| 49 | Rick Zabel † | Germany | BMC Racing Team | 21 | 142 | + 5h 42' 25" | |
| 51 | Maciej Paterski | Poland | CCC–Sprandi–Polkowice | 28 | 79 | + 3h 58' 14" | |
| 52 | Grega Bole | Slovenia | CCC–Sprandi–Polkowice | 29 | 61 | + 3h 15' 43" | |
| 53 | Jarosław Marycz | Poland | CCC–Sprandi–Polkowice | 28 | DNF-12 | — | |
| 54 | Bartłomiej Matysiak | Poland | CCC–Sprandi–Polkowice | 30 | 140 | + 5h 37' 55" | |
| 55 | Nikolay Mihaylov | Bulgaria | CCC–Sprandi–Polkowice | 27 | 129 | + 5h 20' 57" | |
| 56 | Łukasz Owsian † | Poland | CCC–Sprandi–Polkowice | 25 | 118 | + 5h 04' 07" | |
| 57 | Marek Rutkiewicz | Poland | CCC–Sprandi–Polkowice | 34 | 81 | + 4h 00' 37" | |
| 58 | Branislau Samoilau | Belarus | CCC–Sprandi–Polkowice | 29 | 48 | + 2h 49' 01" | |
| 59 | Sylwester Szmyd | Poland | CCC–Sprandi–Polkowice | 37 | 45 | + 2h 45' 21" | |
| 61 | Rigoberto Urán | Colombia | Etixx–Quick-Step | 28 | 14 | + 28' 26" | |
| 62 | Tom Boonen | Belgium | Etixx–Quick-Step | 34 | DNS-14 | — | |
| 63 | Maxime Bouet | France | Etixx–Quick-Step | 28 | 47 | + 2h 48' 49" | |
| 64 | David de la Cruz | Spain | Etixx–Quick-Step | 26 | 34 | + 2h 15' 27" | |
| 65 | Iljo Keisse | Belgium | Etixx–Quick-Step | 32 | 145 | + 5h 46' 04" | |
| 66 | Gianni Meersman | Belgium | Etixx–Quick-Step | 29 | DNF-4 | — | |
| 67 | Fabio Sabatini | Italy | Etixx–Quick-Step | 30 | 110 | + 4h 52' 39" | |
| 68 | Pieter Serry | Belgium | Etixx–Quick-Step | 26 | DNF-2 | — | |
| 69 | Petr Vakoč † | Czech Republic | Etixx–Quick-Step | 22 | 116 | + 5h 01' 14" | |
| 71 | Alexandre Geniez | France | FDJ | 27 | 9 | + 15' 51" | |
| 72 | Arnaud Courteille | France | FDJ | 26 | 124 | + 5h 12' 26" | |
| 73 | Kenny Elissonde † | France | FDJ | 23 | 46 | + 2h 46' 57" | |
| 74 | Murilo Fischer | Brazil | FDJ | 35 | 130 | + 5h 23' 37" | |
| 75 | Francis Mourey | France | FDJ | 34 | 43 | + 2h 44' 29" | |
| 76 | Cédric Pineau | France | FDJ | 30 | 121 | + 5h 10' 03" | |
| 77 | Kévin Reza | France | FDJ | 26 | 103 | + 4h 37' 05" | |
| 78 | Anthony Roux | France | FDJ | 28 | 87 | + 4h 14' 22" | |
| 79 | Jussi Veikkanen | Finland | FDJ | 34 | 147 | + 5h 48' 41" | |
| 81 | Sylvain Chavanel | France | IAM Cycling | 35 | 36 | + 2h 22' 52" | |
| 82 | Clément Chevrier † | France | IAM Cycling | 22 | 69 | + 3h 31' 24" | |
| 83 | Stef Clement | Netherlands | IAM Cycling | 32 | DNF-15 | — | |
| 84 | Heinrich Haussler | Australia | IAM Cycling | 31 | 107 | + 4h 43' 01" | |
| 85 | Roger Kluge | Germany | IAM Cycling | 29 | 162 | + 6h 33' 40" | |
| 86 | Matteo Pelucchi | Italy | IAM Cycling | 26 | DNF-10 | — | |
| 87 | Jérôme Pineau | France | IAM Cycling | 35 | DNF-18 | — | |
| 88 | Sébastien Reichenbach | Switzerland | IAM Cycling | 25 | DNF-16 | — | |
| 89 | Aleksejs Saramotins | Latvia | IAM Cycling | 33 | 161 | + 6h 22' 00" | |
| 91 | Diego Ulissi | Italy | Lampre–Merida | 25 | 64 | + 3h 20' 48" | |
| 92 | Roberto Ferrari | Italy | Lampre–Merida | 32 | 133 | + 5h 26' 53" | |
| 93 | Tsgabu Grmay † | Ethiopia | Lampre–Merida | 23 | 91 | + 4h 20' 33" | |
| 94 | Sacha Modolo | Italy | Lampre–Merida | 27 | 126 | + 5h 16' 43" | |
| 95 | Manuele Mori | Italy | Lampre–Merida | 34 | 80 | + 3h 59' 30" | |
| 96 | Przemysław Niemiec | Poland | Lampre–Merida | 35 | 40 | + 2h 39' 20" | |
| 97 | Jan Polanc † | Slovenia | Lampre–Merida | 23 | 53 | + 2h 55' 08" | |
| 98 | Maximiliano Richeze | Argentina | Lampre–Merida | 32 | 127 | + 5h 16' 51" | |
| 99 | Xu Gang | China | Lampre–Merida | 31 | DNF-16 | — | |
| 100 | Jurgen Van den Broeck | Belgium | Lotto–Soudal | 32 | 12 | + 25' 12" | |
| 101 | Sander Armée | Belgium | Lotto–Soudal | 29 | 65 | + 3h 21' 35" | |
| 102 | Lars Bak | Denmark | Lotto–Soudal | 35 | 90 | + 4h 20' 23" | |
| 103 | Stig Broeckx † | Belgium | Lotto–Soudal | 24 | DNF-18 | — | |
| 104 | André Greipel | Germany | Lotto–Soudal | 32 | DNS-14 | — | |
| 105 | Adam Hansen | Australia | Lotto–Soudal | 33 | 77 | + 3h 49' 51" | |
| 106 | Greg Henderson | New Zealand | Lotto–Soudal | 38 | DNS-14 | — | |
| 107 | Maxime Monfort | Belgium | Lotto–Soudal | 32 | 11 | + 17' 51" | |
| 109 | Louis Vervaeke † | Belgium | Lotto–Soudal | 21 | DNF-16 | — | |
| 111 | Beñat Intxausti | Spain | Movistar Team | 29 | 29 | + 1h 49' 22" | |
| 112 | Andrey Amador | Costa Rica | Movistar Team | 28 | 4 | + 8' 10" | |
| 113 | Igor Antón | Spain | Movistar Team | 32 | 38 | + 2h 27' 19" | |
| 114 | Rubén Fernández † | Spain | Movistar Team | 24 | 62 | + 3h 18' 16" | |
| 115 | Jesús Herrada † | Spain | Movistar Team | 24 | 74 | + 3h 40' 04" | |
| 116 | Jon Izagirre | Spain | Movistar Team | 26 | 27 | + 1h 46' 30" | |
| 117 | Juan José Lobato | Spain | Movistar Team | 26 | DNF-18 | — | |
| 118 | Dayer Quintana † | Colombia | Movistar Team | 22 | 93 | + 4h 21' 18" | |
| 119 | Giovanni Visconti | Italy | Movistar Team | 32 | 18 | + 50' 32" | |
| 121 | Damiano Cunego | Italy | Nippo–Vini Fantini | 33 | DNF-18 | — | |
| 122 | Giacomo Berlato † | Italy | Nippo–Vini Fantini | 23 | 101 | + 4h 35' 09" | |
| 123 | Alessandro Bisolti | Italy | Nippo–Vini Fantini | 30 | 49 | + 2h 51' 45" | |
| 124 | Daniele Colli | Italy | Nippo–Vini Fantini | 33 | DNF-6 | — | |
| 125 | Pierpaolo De Negri | Italy | Nippo–Vini Fantini | 28 | 108 | + 4h 46' 51" | |
| 126 | Eduard-Michael Grosu † | Romania | Nippo–Vini Fantini | 22 | 150 | + 5h 54' 43" | |
| 127 | Manabu Ishibashi † | Japan | Nippo–Vini Fantini | 22 | DNF-9 | — | |
| 128 | Alessandro Malaguti | Italy | Nippo–Vini Fantini | 27 | 154 | + 6h 03' 41" | |
| 129 | Riccardo Stacchiotti † | Italy | Nippo–Vini Fantini | 23 | 152 | + 5h 59' 25" | |
| 131 | Michael Matthews † | Australia | Orica–GreenEDGE | 24 | DNS-14 | — | |
| 132 | Sam Bewley | New Zealand | Orica–GreenEDGE | 27 | 122 | + 5h 10' 21" | |
| 133 | Esteban Chaves † | Colombia | Orica–GreenEDGE | 25 | 55 | + 3h 01' 37" | |
| 134 | Simon Clarke | Australia | Orica–GreenEDGE | 28 | 63 | + 3h 20' 33" | |
| 135 | Luke Durbridge † | Australia | Orica–GreenEDGE | 24 | 109 | + 4h 50' 24" | |
| 136 | Simon Gerrans | Australia | Orica–GreenEDGE | 34 | DNS-13 | — | |
| 137 | Michael Hepburn † | Australia | Orica–GreenEDGE | 23 | 160 | + 6h 13' 16" | |
| 138 | Brett Lancaster | Australia | Orica–GreenEDGE | 35 | 128 | + 5h 18' 55" | |
| 139 | Pieter Weening | Netherlands | Orica–GreenEDGE | 34 | 92 | + 4h 20' 38" | |
| 141 | Manuel Belletti | Italy | Southeast Pro Cycling | 29 | DNF-12 | — | |
| 142 | Matteo Busato | Italy | Southeast Pro Cycling | 27 | 106 | + 4h 42' 22" | |
| 143 | Ramón Carretero † | Panama | Southeast Pro Cycling | 24 | DNF-2 | — | |
| 144 | Elia Favilli | Italy | Southeast Pro Cycling | 26 | 104 | + 4h 40' 04" | |
| 145 | Mauro Finetto | Italy | Southeast Pro Cycling | 29 | 57 | + 3h 05' 25" | |
| 146 | Francesco Gavazzi | Italy | Southeast Pro Cycling | 30 | 58 | + 3h 06' 40" | |
| 147 | Jonathan Monsalve | Venezuela | Southeast Pro Cycling | 25 | 30 | + 1h 50' 19" | |
| 148 | Alessandro Petacchi | Italy | Southeast Pro Cycling | 41 | DNF-20 | — | |
| 149 | Eugert Zhupa † | Albania | Southeast Pro Cycling | 25 | 157 | + 6h 10' 11" | |
| 151 | Ryder Hesjedal | Canada | Cannondale–Garmin | 34 | 5 | + 9' 52" | |
| 152 | Janier Acevedo | Colombia | Cannondale–Garmin | 29 | 120 | + 5h 09' 07" | |
| 153 | Nate Brown † | United States | Cannondale–Garmin | 23 | 67 | + 3h 23' 43" | |
| 154 | André Cardoso | Portugal | Cannondale–Garmin | 30 | 21 | + 1h 19' 27" | |
| 155 | Tom Danielson | United States | Cannondale–Garmin | 37 | DNF-15 | — | |
| 156 | Davide Formolo † | Italy | Cannondale–Garmin | 22 | 31 | + 1h 53' 39" | |
| 157 | Alan Marangoni | Italy | Cannondale–Garmin | 30 | 131 | + 5h 24' 22" | |
| 158 | Tom-Jelte Slagter | Netherlands | Cannondale–Garmin | 25 | 76 | + 3h 43' 59" | |
| 159 | Davide Villella † | Italy | Cannondale–Garmin | 23 | 78 | + 3h 57' 09" | |
| 161 | Luka Mezgec | Slovenia | Team Giant–Alpecin | 26 | 138 | + 5h 34' 36" | |
| 162 | Nikias Arndt † | Germany | Team Giant–Alpecin | 23 | 148 | + 5h 53' 20" | |
| 163 | Bert De Backer | Belgium | Team Giant–Alpecin | 31 | 158 | + 6h 10' 15" | |
| 164 | Caleb Fairly | United States | Team Giant–Alpecin | 28 | 134 | + 5h 27' 03" | |
| 165 | Simon Geschke | Germany | Team Giant–Alpecin | 29 | 89 | + 4h 16' 52" | |
| 166 | Chad Haga | United States | Team Giant–Alpecin | 26 | 99 | + 4h 34' 18" | |
| 167 | Ji Cheng | China | Team Giant–Alpecin | 27 | 156 | + 6h 09' 33" | |
| 168 | Tobias Ludvigsson † | Sweden | Team Giant–Alpecin | 24 | 83 | + 4h 02' 19" | |
| 169 | Tom Stamsnijder | Netherlands | Team Giant–Alpecin | 29 | 153 | + 6h 00' 08" | |
| 171 | Luca Paolini | Italy | Team Katusha | 38 | 111 | + 4h 54' 31" | |
| 172 | Maxim Belkov | Russia | Team Katusha | 30 | 102 | + 4h 35' 43" | |
| 173 | Sergey Chernetskiy † | Russia | Team Katusha | 25 | 114 | + 5h 00' 19" | |
| 174 | Sergey Lagutin | Russia | Team Katusha | 34 | 72 | + 3h 36' 11" | |
| 175 | Alexander Porsev | Russia | Team Katusha | 29 | 132 | + 5h 26' 12" | |
| 176 | Pavel Kochetkov | Russia | Team Katusha | 29 | 37 | + 2h 23' 10" | |
| 177 | Yuri Trofimov | Russia | Team Katusha | 31 | 10 | + 16' 14" | |
| 178 | Anton Vorobyev † | Russia | Team Katusha | 24 | DNS-3 | — | |
| 179 | Ilnur Zakarin | Russia | Team Katusha | 25 | 44 | + 2h 45' 10" | |
| 181 | Steven Kruijswijk | Netherlands | LottoNL–Jumbo | 27 | 7 | + 10' 53" | |
| 182 | George Bennett † | New Zealand | LottoNL–Jumbo | 25 | DNS-1 | — | |
| 183 | Rick Flens | Netherlands | LottoNL–Jumbo | 32 | 144 | + 5h 45' 15" | |
| 184 | Moreno Hofland † | Netherlands | LottoNL–Jumbo | 23 | 136 | + 5h 32' 46" | |
| 185 | Martijn Keizer | Netherlands | LottoNL–Jumbo | 27 | 56 | + 3h 02' 04" | |
| 186 | Bert-Jan Lindeman | Netherlands | LottoNL–Jumbo | 25 | 95 | + 4h 26' 02" | |
| 187 | Maarten Tjallingii | Netherlands | LottoNL–Jumbo | 37 | 119 | + 5h 07' 22" | |
| 188 | Nick van der Lijke † | Netherlands | LottoNL–Jumbo | 23 | 86 | + 4h 06' 57" | |
| 189 | Robert Wagner | Germany | LottoNL–Jumbo | 32 | DNF-4 | — | |
| 191 | Richie Porte | Australia | Team Sky | 30 | DNS-16 | — | |
| 192 | Bernhard Eisel | Austria | Team Sky | 34 | 143 | + 5h 42' 37" | |
| 193 | Sebastián Henao † | Colombia | Team Sky | 21 | 41 | + 2h 39' 28" | |
| 194 | Vasil Kiryienka | Belarus | Team Sky | 33 | 84 | + 4h 03' 27" | |
| 195 | Leopold König | Czech Republic | Team Sky | 27 | 6 | + 10' 41" | |
| 196 | Mikel Nieve | Spain | Team Sky | 30 | 17 | + 48' 24" | |
| 197 | Salvatore Puccio | Italy | Team Sky | 25 | 68 | + 3h 30' 11" | |
| 198 | Kanstantsin Sivtsov | Belarus | Team Sky | 32 | 26 | + 1h 45' 52" | |
| 199 | Elia Viviani | Italy | Team Sky | 26 | 125 | + 5h 14' 35" | |
| 201 | Alberto Contador | Spain | Tinkoff–Saxo | 32 | 1 | 88h 22' 25" | |
| 202 | Ivan Basso | Italy | Tinkoff–Saxo | 37 | 51 | + 2h 52' 16" | |
| 203 | Manuele Boaro | Italy | Tinkoff–Saxo | 28 | 96 | + 4h 26' 32" | |
| 204 | Christopher Juul-Jensen | Denmark | Tinkoff–Saxo | 25 | 135 | + 5h 30' 09" | |
| 205 | Roman Kreuziger | Czech Republic | Tinkoff–Saxo | 29 | 28 | + 1h 47' 03" | |
| 206 | Sérgio Paulinho | Portugal | Tinkoff–Saxo | 35 | 97 | + 4h 32' 23" | |
| 207 | Michael Rogers | Australia | Tinkoff–Saxo | 35 | 33 | + 2h 11' 06" | |
| 208 | Ivan Rovny | Russia | Tinkoff–Saxo | 27 | 115 | + 5h 00' 44" | |
| 209 | Matteo Tosatto | Italy | Tinkoff–Saxo | 40 | 112 | + 4h 54' 45" | |
| 211 | Giacomo Nizzolo | Italy | Trek Factory Racing | 26 | 137 | + 5h 33' 26" | |
| 212 | Eugenio Alafaci † | Italy | Trek Factory Racing | 24 | 141 | + 5h 38' 12" | |
| 213 | Fumiyuki Beppu | Japan | Trek Factory Racing | 32 | 117 | + 5h 02' 43" | |
| 214 | Marco Coledan | Italy | Trek Factory Racing | 26 | 163 | + 6h 40' 13" | |
| 215 | Fabio Felline † | Italy | Trek Factory Racing | 25 | 32 | + 1h 55' 57" | |
| 216 | Fábio Silvestre † | Portugal | Trek Factory Racing | 25 | 149 | + 5h 54' 39" | |
| 217 | Boy van Poppel | Netherlands | Trek Factory Racing | 27 | 146 | + 5h 48' 23" | |
| 218 | Kristof Vandewalle | Belgium | Trek Factory Racing | 30 | DNS-15 | — | |
| 219 | Calvin Watson † | Australia | Trek Factory Racing | 22 | 151 | + 5h 56' 12" | |

=== By team ===
AG2R La Mondiale (ALM)
| No. | Rider | Pos. |
|---|---|---|
| 1 | Domenico Pozzovivo (ITA) | DNF-3 |
| 2 | Julien Bérard (FRA) | 105 |
| 3 | Carlos Betancur (COL) | 20 |
| 4 | Axel Domont (FRA) † | 75 |
| 5 | Hubert Dupont (FRA) | 42 |
| 6 | Patrick Gretsch (DEU) | 94 |
| 7 | Hugo Houle (CAN) † | 113 |
| 8 | Matteo Montaguti (ITA) | 54 |
| 9 | Rinaldo Nocentini (ITA) | 73 |

Androni Giocattoli–Sidermec (AND)
| No. | Rider | Pos. |
|---|---|---|
| 11 | Franco Pellizotti (ITA) | 24 |
| 12 | Davide Appollonio (ITA) | 123 |
| 13 | Marco Bandiera (ITA) | 155 |
| 14 | Tiziano Dall'Antonia (ITA) | HD-5 |
| 15 | Marco Frapporti (ITA) | 98 |
| 16 | Oscar Gatto (ITA) | DNS-15 |
| 17 | Simone Stortoni (ITA) | 50 |
| 18 | Serghei Țvetcov (ROU) | 139 |
| 19 | Gianfranco Zilioli (ITA) † | 71 |

Astana (AST)
| No. | Rider | Pos. |
|---|---|---|
| 21 | Fabio Aru (ITA) † | 2 |
| 22 | Dario Cataldo (ITA) | 25 |
| 23 | Tanel Kangert (EST) | 13 |
| 24 | Mikel Landa (ESP) | 3 |
| 25 | Davide Malacarne (ITA) | 85 |
| 26 | Diego Rosa (ITA) | 23 |
| 27 | Luis León Sánchez (ESP) | 35 |
| 28 | Paolo Tiralongo (ITA) | 19 |
| 29 | Andrey Zeits (KAZ) | 59 |

Bardiani–CSF (CSF)
| No. | Rider | Pos. |
|---|---|---|
| 31 | Francesco Manuel Bongiorno (ITA) † | 60 |
| 32 | Enrico Barbin (ITA) † | DNF-17 |
| 33 | Enrico Battaglin (ITA) | DNF-19 |
| 34 | Nicola Boem (ITA) | 159 |
| 35 | Luca Chirico (ITA) † | 88 |
| 36 | Sonny Colbrelli (ITA) † | 100 |
| 37 | Stefano Pirazzi (ITA) | 22 |
| 38 | Nicola Ruffoni (ITA) † | DNF-15 |
| 39 | Edoardo Zardini (ITA) | 82 |

BMC Racing Team (BMC)
| No. | Rider | Pos. |
|---|---|---|
| 41 | Philippe Gilbert (BEL) | 39 |
| 42 | Darwin Atapuma (COL) | 16 |
| 43 | Brent Bookwalter (USA) | 66 |
| 44 | Marcus Burghardt (DEU) | 70 |
| 45 | Damiano Caruso (ITA) | 8 |
| 46 | Silvan Dillier (SUI) † | 52 |
| 47 | Stefan Küng (SUI) † | DNF-12 |
| 48 | Amaël Moinard (FRA) | 15 |
| 49 | Rick Zabel (DEU) † | 142 |

CCC–Sprandi–Polkowice (CCC)
| No. | Rider | Pos. |
|---|---|---|
| 51 | Maciej Paterski (POL) | 79 |
| 52 | Grega Bole (SLO) | 61 |
| 53 | Jarosław Marycz (POL) | DNF-12 |
| 54 | Bartłomiej Matysiak (POL) | 140 |
| 55 | Nikolay Mihaylov (BUL) | 129 |
| 56 | Łukasz Owsian (POL) † | 118 |
| 57 | Marek Rutkiewicz (POL) | 81 |
| 58 | Branislau Samoilau (BLR) | 48 |
| 59 | Sylwester Szmyd (POL) | 45 |

Etixx–Quick-Step (OPQ)
| No. | Rider | Pos. |
|---|---|---|
| 61 | Rigoberto Urán (COL) | 14 |
| 62 | Tom Boonen (BEL) | DNS-14 |
| 63 | Maxime Bouet (FRA) | 47 |
| 64 | David de la Cruz (ESP) | 34 |
| 65 | Iljo Keisse (BEL) | 145 |
| 66 | Gianni Meersman (BEL) | DNF-4 |
| 67 | Fabio Sabatini (ITA) | 110 |
| 68 | Pieter Serry (BEL) | DNF-2 |
| 69 | Petr Vakoč (CZE) † | 116 |

FDJ (FDJ)
| No. | Rider | Pos. |
|---|---|---|
| 71 | Alexandre Geniez (FRA) | 9 |
| 72 | Arnaud Courteille (FRA) | 124 |
| 73 | Kenny Elissonde (FRA) † | 46 |
| 74 | Murilo Fischer (BRA) | 130 |
| 75 | Francis Mourey (FRA) | 43 |
| 76 | Cédric Pineau (FRA) | 121 |
| 77 | Kévin Reza (FRA) | 103 |
| 78 | Anthony Roux (FRA) | 87 |
| 79 | Jussi Veikkanen (FIN) | 147 |

IAM Cycling (IAM)
| No. | Rider | Pos. |
|---|---|---|
| 81 | Sylvain Chavanel (FRA) | 36 |
| 82 | Clément Chevrier (FRA) † | 69 |
| 83 | Stef Clement (NED) | DNF-15 |
| 84 | Heinrich Haussler (AUS) | 107 |
| 85 | Roger Kluge (DEU) | 162 |
| 86 | Matteo Pelucchi (ITA) | DNF-10 |
| 87 | Jérôme Pineau (FRA) | DNF-18 |
| 88 | Sébastien Reichenbach (SUI) | DNF-16 |
| 89 | Aleksejs Saramotins (LAT) | 161 |

Lampre–Merida (LAM)
| No. | Rider | Pos. |
|---|---|---|
| 91 | Diego Ulissi (ITA) | 64 |
| 92 | Roberto Ferrari (ITA) | 133 |
| 93 | Tsgabu Grmay (ETH) † | 91 |
| 94 | Sacha Modolo (ITA) | 126 |
| 95 | Manuele Mori (ITA) | 80 |
| 96 | Przemysław Niemiec (POL) | 40 |
| 97 | Jan Polanc (SLO) † | 53 |
| 98 | Maximiliano Richeze (ARG) | 127 |
| 99 | Xu Gang (CHN) | DNF-16 |

Lotto–Soudal (LTB)
| No. | Rider | Pos. |
|---|---|---|
| 100 | Jurgen Van den Broeck (BEL) | 12 |
| 101 | Sander Armée (BEL) | 65 |
| 102 | Lars Bak (DEN) | 90 |
| 103 | Stig Broeckx (BEL) † | DNF-18 |
| 104 | André Greipel (DEU) | DNS-14 |
| 105 | Adam Hansen (AUS) | 77 |
| 106 | Greg Henderson (NZL) | DNS-14 |
| 107 | Maxime Monfort (BEL) | 11 |
| 109 | Louis Vervaeke (BEL) † | DNF-16 |

Movistar Team (MOV)
| No. | Rider | Pos. |
|---|---|---|
| 111 | Beñat Intxausti (ESP) | 29 |
| 112 | Andrey Amador (CRC) | 4 |
| 113 | Igor Antón (ESP) | 38 |
| 114 | Rubén Fernández (ESP) † | 62 |
| 115 | Jesús Herrada (ESP) † | 74 |
| 116 | Jon Izagirre (ESP) | 27 |
| 117 | Juan José Lobato (ESP) | DNF-18 |
| 118 | Dayer Quintana (COL) † | 93 |
| 119 | Giovanni Visconti (ITA) | 18 |

Nippo–Vini Fantini (PPO)
| No. | Rider | Pos. |
|---|---|---|
| 121 | Damiano Cunego (ITA) | DNF-18 |
| 122 | Giacomo Berlato (ITA) † | 101 |
| 123 | Alessandro Bisolti (ITA) | 49 |
| 124 | Daniele Colli (ITA) | DNF-6 |
| 125 | Pierpaolo De Negri (ITA) | 108 |
| 126 | Eduard-Michael Grosu (ROU) † | 150 |
| 127 | Manabu Ishibashi (JPN) † | DNF-9 |
| 128 | Alessandro Malaguti (ITA) | 154 |
| 129 | Riccardo Stacchiotti (ITA) † | 152 |

Orica–GreenEDGE (OGE)
| No. | Rider | Pos. |
|---|---|---|
| 131 | Michael Matthews (AUS) † | DNS-14 |
| 132 | Sam Bewley (NZL) | 122 |
| 133 | Esteban Chaves (COL) † | 55 |
| 134 | Simon Clarke (AUS) | 63 |
| 135 | Luke Durbridge (AUS) † | 109 |
| 136 | Simon Gerrans (AUS) | DNS-13 |
| 137 | Michael Hepburn (AUS) † | 160 |
| 138 | Brett Lancaster (AUS) | 128 |
| 139 | Pieter Weening (NED) | 92 |

Southeast Pro Cycling (NRI)
| No. | Rider | Pos. |
|---|---|---|
| 141 | Manuel Belletti (ITA) | DNF-12 |
| 142 | Matteo Busato (ITA) | 106 |
| 143 | Ramón Carretero (PAN) † | DNF-2 |
| 144 | Elia Favilli (ITA) | 104 |
| 145 | Mauro Finetto (ITA) | 57 |
| 146 | Francesco Gavazzi (ITA) | 58 |
| 147 | Jonathan Monsalve (VEN) | 30 |
| 148 | Alessandro Petacchi (ITA) | DNF-20 |
| 149 | Eugert Zhupa (ALB) † | 157 |

Cannondale–Garmin (TCG)
| No. | Rider | Pos. |
|---|---|---|
| 151 | Ryder Hesjedal (CAN) | 5 |
| 152 | Janier Acevedo (COL) | 120 |
| 153 | Nate Brown (USA) † | 67 |
| 154 | André Cardoso (POR) | 21 |
| 155 | Tom Danielson (USA) | DNF-15 |
| 156 | Davide Formolo (ITA) † | 31 |
| 157 | Alan Marangoni (ITA) | 131 |
| 158 | Tom-Jelte Slagter (NED) | 76 |
| 159 | Davide Villella (ITA) † | 78 |

Team Giant–Alpecin (GIA)
| No. | Rider | Pos. |
|---|---|---|
| 161 | Luka Mezgec (SLO) | 138 |
| 162 | Nikias Arndt (DEU) † | 148 |
| 163 | Bert De Backer (BEL) | 158 |
| 164 | Caleb Fairly (USA) | 134 |
| 165 | Simon Geschke (DEU) | 89 |
| 166 | Chad Haga (USA) | 99 |
| 167 | Ji Cheng (CHN) | 156 |
| 168 | Tobias Ludvigsson (SWE) † | 83 |
| 169 | Tom Stamsnijder (NED) | 153 |

Team Katusha (KAT)
| No. | Rider | Pos. |
|---|---|---|
| 171 | Luca Paolini (ITA) | 111 |
| 172 | Maxim Belkov (RUS) | 102 |
| 173 | Sergey Chernetskiy (RUS) † | 114 |
| 174 | Sergey Lagutin (RUS) | 72 |
| 175 | Alexander Porsev (RUS) | 132 |
| 176 | Pavel Kochetkov (RUS) | 37 |
| 177 | Yuri Trofimov (RUS) | 10 |
| 178 | Anton Vorobyev (RUS) † | DNS-3 |
| 179 | Ilnur Zakarin (RUS) | 44 |

LottoNL–Jumbo (TLJ)
| No. | Rider | Pos. |
|---|---|---|
| 181 | Steven Kruijswijk (NED) | 7 |
| 182 | George Bennett (NZL) † | DNS-1 |
| 183 | Rick Flens (NED) | 144 |
| 184 | Moreno Hofland (NED) † | 136 |
| 185 | Martijn Keizer (NED) | 56 |
| 186 | Bert-Jan Lindeman (NED) | 95 |
| 187 | Maarten Tjallingii (NED) | 119 |
| 188 | Nick van der Lijke (NED) † | 86 |
| 189 | Robert Wagner (DEU) | DNF-4 |

Team Sky (SKY)
| No. | Rider | Pos. |
|---|---|---|
| 191 | Richie Porte (AUS) | DNS-16 |
| 192 | Bernhard Eisel (AUT) | 143 |
| 193 | Sebastián Henao (COL) † | 41 |
| 194 | Vasil Kiryienka (BLR) | 84 |
| 195 | Leopold König (CZE) | 6 |
| 196 | Mikel Nieve (ESP) | 17 |
| 197 | Salvatore Puccio (ITA) | 68 |
| 198 | Kanstantsin Sivtsov (BLR) | 26 |
| 199 | Elia Viviani (ITA) | 125 |

Tinkoff–Saxo (SAX)
| No. | Rider | Pos. |
|---|---|---|
| 201 | Alberto Contador (ESP) | 1 |
| 202 | Ivan Basso (ITA) | 51 |
| 203 | Manuele Boaro (ITA) | 96 |
| 204 | Christopher Juul-Jensen (DEN) | 135 |
| 205 | Roman Kreuziger (CZE) | 28 |
| 206 | Sérgio Paulinho (POR) | 97 |
| 207 | Michael Rogers (AUS) | 33 |
| 208 | Ivan Rovny (RUS) | 115 |
| 209 | Matteo Tosatto (ITA) | 112 |

Trek Factory Racing (TFR)
| No. | Rider | Pos. |
|---|---|---|
| 211 | Giacomo Nizzolo (ITA) | 137 |
| 212 | Eugenio Alafaci (ITA) † | 141 |
| 213 | Fumiyuki Beppu (JPN) | 117 |
| 214 | Marco Coledan (ITA) | 163 |
| 215 | Fabio Felline (ITA) † | 32 |
| 216 | Fábio Silvestre (POR) † | 149 |
| 217 | Boy van Poppel (NED) | 146 |
| 218 | Kristof Vandewalle (BEL) | DNS-15 |
| 219 | Calvin Watson (AUS) † | 151 |

=== By nationality ===
The 198 riders that competed in the 2015 Giro d'Italia originated from 36 different countries. Riders from eight countries won stages during the race; Italian riders won the highest number, with seven riders winning a total of nine stages.

| Country | No. of riders | Finishers | Stage wins |
|---|---|---|---|
| Albania | 1 | 1 | |
| Argentina | 1 | 1 | |
| Australia | 11 | 8 | 1 (Michael Matthews) |
| Austria | 1 | 1 | |
| Belarus | 3 | 3 | 1 (Vasil Kiryienka) |
| Belgium | 12 | 6 | 3 (Philippe Gilbert ×2, Iljo Keisse) |
| Brazil | 1 | 1 | |
| Bulgaria | 1 | 1 | |
| Canada | 2 | 2 | |
| China | 2 | 1 | |
| Colombia | 7 | 7 | |
| Costa Rica | 1 | 1 | |
| Czech Republic | 3 | 3 | |
| Denmark | 2 | 2 | |
| Estonia | 1 | 1 | |
| Ethiopia | 1 | 1 | |
| Finland | 1 | 1 | |
| France | 15 | 14 | |
| Germany | 8 | 6 | 1 (André Greipel) |
| Italy | 59 | 48 | 9 (Fabio Aru ×2, Sacha Modolo ×2, Nicola Boem, Davide Formolo, Paolo Tiralongo, Diego Ulissi, Elia Viviani) |
| Japan | 2 | 1 | |
| Kazakhstan | 1 | 1 | |
| Latvia | 1 | 1 | |
| Netherlands | 12 | 11 | |
| New Zealand | 3 | 1 | |
| Panama | 1 | 0 | |
| Poland | 7 | 6 | |
| Portugal | 3 | 3 | |
| Romania | 2 | 2 | |
| Russia | 9 | 8 | 1 (Ilnur Zakarin) |
| Slovenia | 3 | 3 | 1 (Jan Polanc) |
| Spain | 11 | 10 | 3 (Mikel Landa ×2, Beñat Intxausti) |
| Sweden | 1 | 1 | |
| Switzerland | 3 | 1 | |
| United States | 5 | 4 | |
| Venezuela | 1 | 1 | |
| Total | 198 | 163 | 20 (Note: The team time trial on stage 1, won by Orica–GreenEDGE, is not counted in this total.) |
