= 2015 Giro d'Italia, Stage 1 to Stage 11 =

Stages 1 to 11 of an Italian multi-day road cycling race

The 2015 Giro d'Italia began on 9 May, and stage 11 occurred on 20 May. The race began with a team time trial from San Lorenzo al Mare to Sanremo.

Legend
A pink jersey	Denotes the leader of the General classification	A blue jersey	Denotes the leader of the Mountains classification
A red jersey	Denotes the leader of the Points classification	A white jersey	Denotes the leader of the Young rider classification

== Stage 1 ==
9 May 2015 — San Lorenzo al Mare to Sanremo, 17.6 km (10.9 mi), team time trial (TTT)

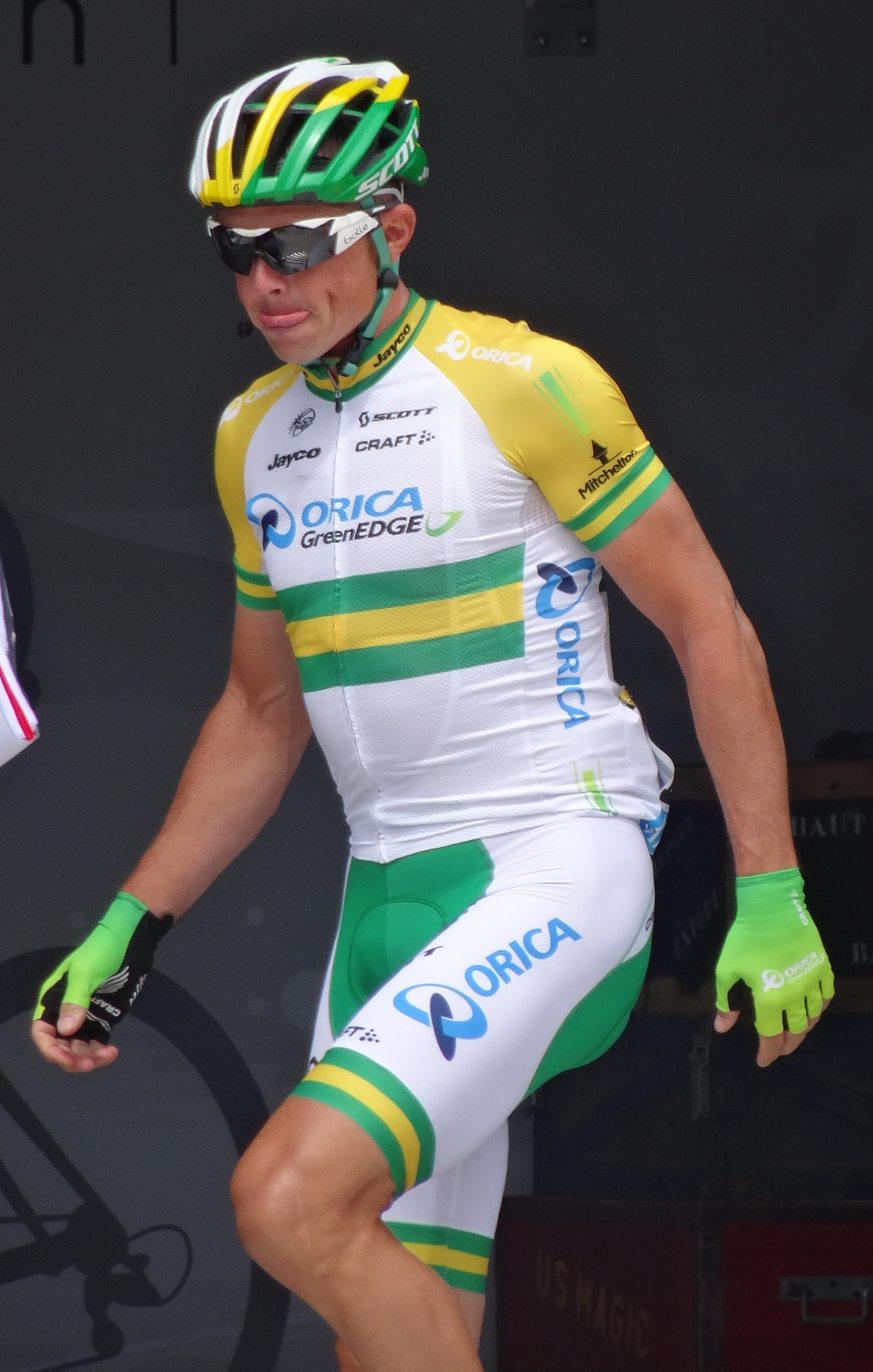
Simon Gerrans was the first wearer of the maglia rosa in this Giro d'Italia

The 2015 Giro started with a team time trial in Liguria, a feature included every year since the 2006 Giro d'Italia. The course was flat, but almost entirely along the Riviera del Flori cycle path. It concluded on the Lungomare Italo Calvino in Sanremo, finish to the Milan–San Remo race between 2008 and 2014. Team Sky were believed to be the favourites, having won the Tour de Romandie team time trial a week before the race started, along with Orica–GreenEDGE, the winners of the previous year's team time trial in Belfast who desired a win in the team time trial by including multiple time-trial specialists in their lineup.

Lampre–Merida were the first team to start, with teams starting after every five minutes. They recorded a time of 20' 25" but their time was only good enough for the second slowest time on the stage. Their time was shortly bettered by AG2R La Mondiale, who were 11 seconds faster. The first competitive time was set by Astana. The Kazakh team set a time of 19' 39" which was good enough to hold the lead for an hour. Some of the favourites for the stage like Team Sky, Etixx–Quick-Step and BMC Racing Team set competitive times but they could not knock Astana off the hot seat. Eventually, only two teams were able to beat Astana's time. The first team to beat their time was Orica–GreenEDGE. They stopped the clock in 19' 26", a time which was good enough for the stage-winning time. The only team to go closer to Orica–GreenEDGE's time was Tinkoff–Saxo, who were the fastest at the 9.9-kilometre (6.2-mile) checkpoint. However they faded in the second half of the course, handing Orica–GreenEDGE the win. Simon Gerrans was first over the line, making him the first leader, although he claimed later that he would not keep it for long, and that Michael Matthews would probably take it in the sprint the next day.

As for the general classification contenders, Alberto Contador of Tinkoff–Saxo was the best-placed rider as he was only 7 seconds off the lead. His advantage over Fabio Aru of Astana was 6 seconds and his advantage over Rigoberto Urán of Etixx–Quick-Step was 12 seconds. Richie Porte of Team Sky suffered the most as he lost 20 seconds to Contador and he lost significant time to other general classification contenders.

Stage 1 result

	Team	Time
1	Orica–GreenEDGE	19' 26"
2	Tinkoff–Saxo	+ 7"
3	Astana	+ 13"
4	Etixx–Quick-Step	+ 19"
5	Movistar Team	+ 21"
6	IAM Cycling	+ 25"
7	BMC Racing Team	+ 25"
8	FDJ	+ 26"
9	Team Sky	+ 27"
10	Team Katusha	+ 27"

General classification after Stage 1

	Rider	Team	Time
1	Simon Gerrans (AUS)	Orica–GreenEDGE	19' 26"
2	Michael Matthews (AUS)	Orica–GreenEDGE	+ 0"
3	Michael Hepburn (AUS)	Orica–GreenEDGE	+ 0"
4	Pieter Weening (NED)	Orica–GreenEDGE	+ 0"
5	Simon Clarke (AUS)	Orica–GreenEDGE	+ 0"
6	Esteban Chaves (COL)	Orica–GreenEDGE	+ 0"
7	Manuele Boaro (ITA)	Tinkoff–Saxo	+ 7"
8	Roman Kreuziger (CZE)	Tinkoff–Saxo	+ 7"
9	Michael Rogers (AUS)	Tinkoff–Saxo	+ 7"
10	Alberto Contador (ESP)	Tinkoff–Saxo	+ 7"

== Stage 2 ==
10 May 2015 — Albenga to Genoa, 177 km (110.0 mi)

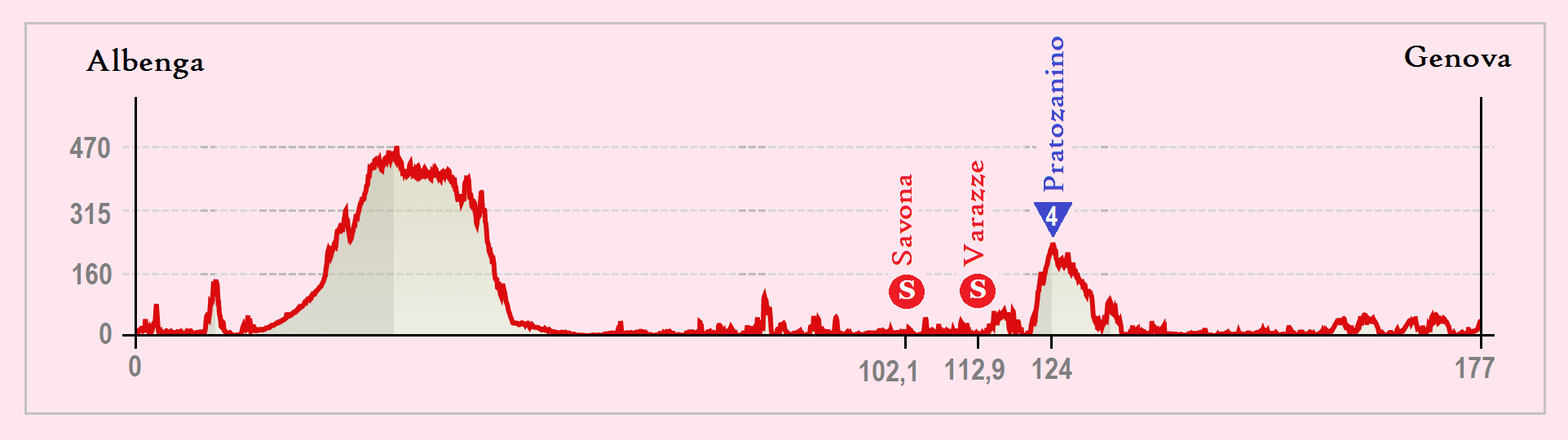
Stage 2 profile

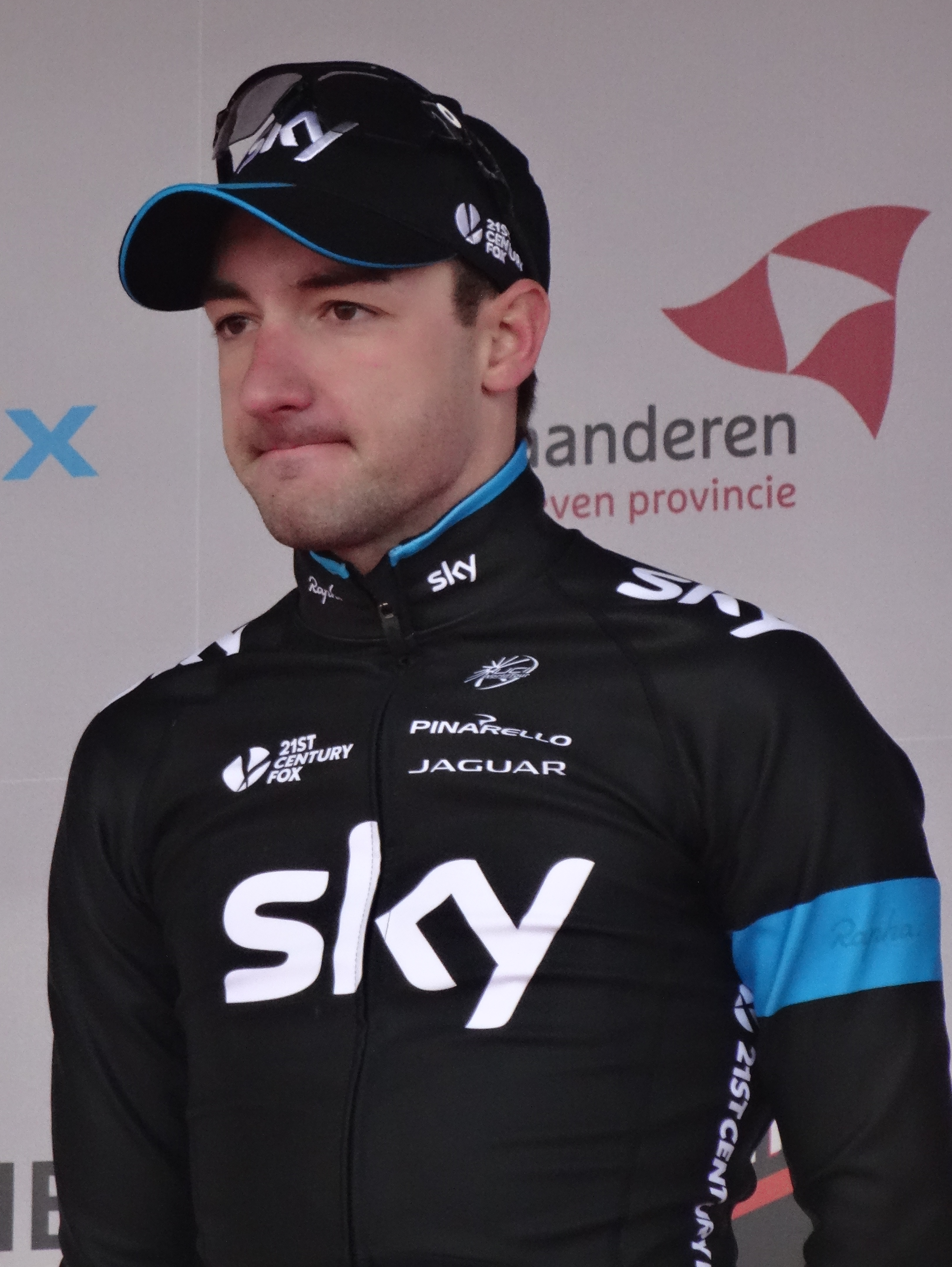
Elia Viviani won the first road stage of the Giro d'Italia.

The first road stage was also held along the Ligurian coast. On the 177-kilometre (110-mile) parcours, there were two intermediate sprints, in Savona and Varazze, along with a fourth category climb of the Pratozanino, but other than that, there were only one other ascent that ended still with more than 120 kilometres (75 miles) to go. As a result, it was still expected to result in a sprint in Genoa, where two laps of a 9.5-kilometre (5.9-mile) circuit were completed, to complete the day's running.

The day's breakaway was formed by five riders, consisting of Androni Giocattoli–Sidermec's Marco Frapporti, CCC–Sprandi–Polkowice's Łukasz Owsian, Eugert Zhupa of Southeast Pro Cycling, Giacomo Berlato of Nippo–Vini Fantini and Bert-Jan Lindeman representing LottoNL–Jumbo. They managed to obtain a lead over the peloton of nine minutes, however, it was then that the peloton, led by Orica–GreenEDGE started pursuit to ensure that their riders would keep the pink jersey. En route, Frapporti took maximum points at both sprints ahead of the mountain sprint.

Owsian soon attacked for the mountain sprint, however, Lindeman countered from his wheel and took maximum points, granting him the blue jersey. At this point, the five were about three minutes ahead of the peloton. Tinkoff–Saxo soon worked hard to bring the field back together and the breakaway was finally concluded when Owsian, the last surviving breakaway rider, was caught with 11 kilometres (6.8 miles) to go. Several crashes took down some sprinters and domestiques but the biggest time loss was suffered by Domenico Pozzovivo as he was caught behind the crashes, and lost 1' 09" in the process. André Greipel was the first to sprint for the win but he was overtaken by Moreno Hofland, who in turn was overtaken by Elia Viviani of Team Sky. Viviani ultimately beat Hofland to the sprint by about a wheel, granting him the red jersey. Finishing 7th on the stage as the highest placed Orica–GreenEDGE rider, Michael Matthews took the maglia rosa although he did not pick up any time bonuses and was still tied on time with Simon Gerrans, Simon Clarke and Esteban Chaves. Matthews also took the white jersey as the best young rider.

Stage 2 result

	Rider	Team	Time
1	Elia Viviani (ITA)	Team Sky	4h 13' 18"
2	Moreno Hofland (NED)	LottoNL–Jumbo	+ 0"
3	André Greipel (GER)	Lotto–Soudal	+ 0"
4	Luka Mezgec (SLO)	Team Giant–Alpecin	+ 0"
5	Alessandro Petacchi (ITA)	Southeast Pro Cycling	+ 0"
6	Giacomo Nizzolo (ITA)	Trek Factory Racing	+ 0"
7	Michael Matthews (AUS)	Orica–GreenEDGE	+ 0"
8	Davide Appollonio (ITA)	Androni Giocattoli–Sidermec	+ 0"
9	Daniele Colli (ITA)	Nippo–Vini Fantini	+ 0"
10	Paolo Tiralongo (ITA)	Astana	+ 0"

General classification after Stage 2

	Rider	Team	Time
1	Michael Matthews (AUS)	Orica–GreenEDGE	4h 32' 44"
2	Simon Gerrans (AUS)	Orica–GreenEDGE	+ 0"
3	Simon Clarke (AUS)	Orica–GreenEDGE	+ 0"
4	Esteban Chaves (COL)	Orica–GreenEDGE	+ 0"
5	Roman Kreuziger (CZE)	Tinkoff–Saxo	+ 7"
6	Alberto Contador (ESP)	Tinkoff–Saxo	+ 7"
7	Michael Rogers (AUS)	Tinkoff–Saxo	+ 7"
8	Manuele Boaro (ITA)	Tinkoff–Saxo	+ 7"
9	Ivan Rovny (RUS)	Tinkoff–Saxo	+ 7"
10	Paolo Tiralongo (ITA)	Astana	+ 13"

== Stage 3 ==
11 May 2015 — Rapallo to Sestri Levante, 136 km (84.5 mi)

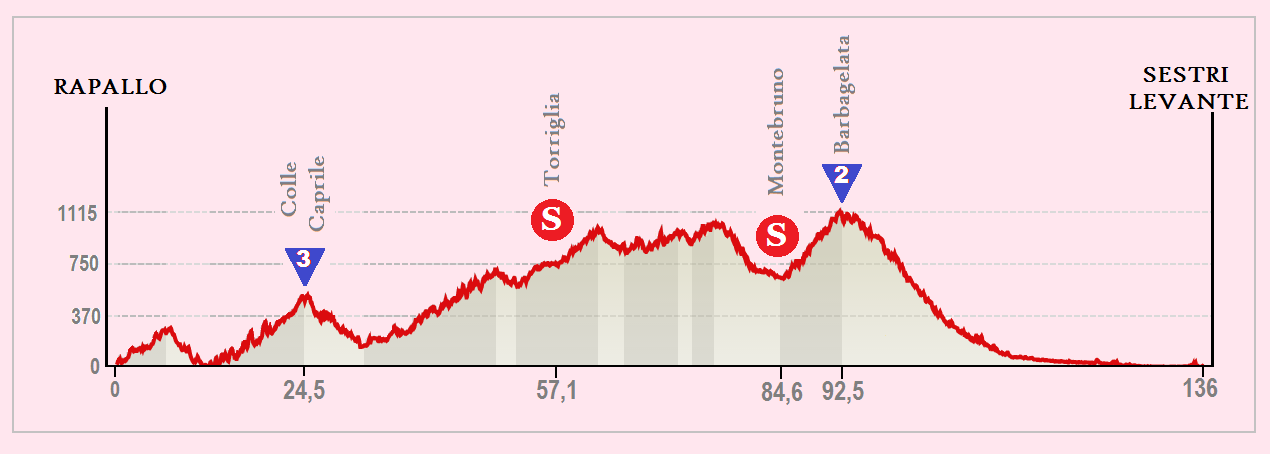
Stage 3 profile

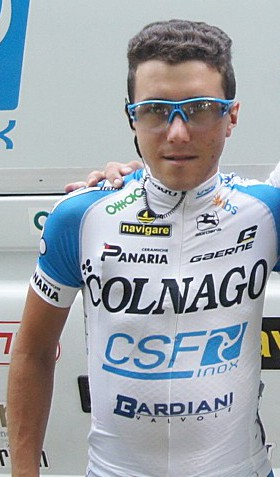
Domenico Pozzovivo suffered a severe crash during Stage 3, ending his Giro prematurely

The first medium-mountain stage was held in the Cinque Terre area. The course was relatively short, but included two climbs - the third-category Colle Caprille and the second category Barbagelata, the summit of which came with 52 kilometres (32.3 miles) to go. It had a long descent, which concluded 25 kilometres (15.5 miles) ahead of the finish in Sestri Levante. There were also two intermediate sprints, in Torriglia and in Montebruno. Pre-race analysis suggested that the stage would either be won by a breakaway, or an attack on the second category climb.

The day's breakaway was formed by 25 riders. The best placed men in the breakaway were Simon Clarke and Esteban Chaves of Orica–GreenEDGE as they were at the same time as maglia rosa wearer Michael Matthews before the beginning of the stage. Tinkoff–Saxo would set a hard tempo in the peloton and the breakaway was only allowed to have a maximum lead of around 3 minutes before the peloton chipped into the lead. During the climbs in the middle of the course, several sprinters fell off the back of the peloton. During the climb of the second category Barbagelata, the breakaway was reduced to around a dozen riders before Pavel Kochetkov of Team Katusha took maximum points at the summit of the climb, ensuring he would take the blue jersey.

During the descent, Domenico Pozzovivo crashed out of the race and he was taken to hospital. Italian television reported that Pozzovivo was moving and breathing for himself when he was taken away in the ambulance. He was bleeding from wounds to his face. As the stage wore on, Adam Hansen, on his 34th birthday, attacked out of the breakaway and he was joined by Maciej Paterski and Clarke. They caught Kochetkov with around 10 kilometres (6.2 miles) left but the peloton caught them with around 3 kilometres (1.9 miles) to go. In the mass sprint, Fabio Felline sprinted for the win but it was Matthews who passed him with 150 metres (490 feet) to go to take the stage win. As a result of the time bonuses, he extended his general classification lead to 6 seconds over Clarke.

Stage 3 result

	Rider	Team	Time
1	Michael Matthews (AUS)	Orica–GreenEDGE	3h 33' 53"
2	Fabio Felline (ITA)	Trek Factory Racing	+ 0"
3	Philippe Gilbert (BEL)	BMC Racing Team	+ 0"
4	Sergey Lagutin (RUS)	Team Katusha	+ 0"
5	Paolo Tiralongo (ITA)	Astana	+ 0"
6	Luca Paolini (ITA)	Team Katusha	+ 0"
7	Francesco Gavazzi (ITA)	Southeast Pro Cycling	+ 0"
8	Enrico Battaglin (ITA)	Bardiani–CSF	+ 0"
9	Luis León Sánchez (ESP)	Astana	+ 0"
10	Jonathan Monsalve (VEN)	Southeast Pro Cycling	+ 0"

General classification after Stage 3

	Rider	Team	Time
1	Michael Matthews (AUS)	Orica–GreenEDGE	8h 06' 27"
2	Simon Clarke (AUS)	Orica–GreenEDGE	+ 6"
3	Simon Gerrans (AUS)	Orica–GreenEDGE	+ 10"
4	Esteban Chaves (COL)	Orica–GreenEDGE	+ 10"
5	Roman Kreuziger (CZE)	Tinkoff–Saxo	+ 17"
6	Alberto Contador (ESP)	Tinkoff–Saxo	+ 17"
7	Michael Rogers (AUS)	Tinkoff–Saxo	+ 17"
8	Paolo Tiralongo (ITA)	Astana	+ 23"
9	Fabio Aru (ITA)	Astana	+ 23"
10	Diego Rosa (ITA)	Astana	+ 23"

== Stage 4 ==
12 May 2015 — Chiavari to La Spezia, 150 km (93.2 mi)

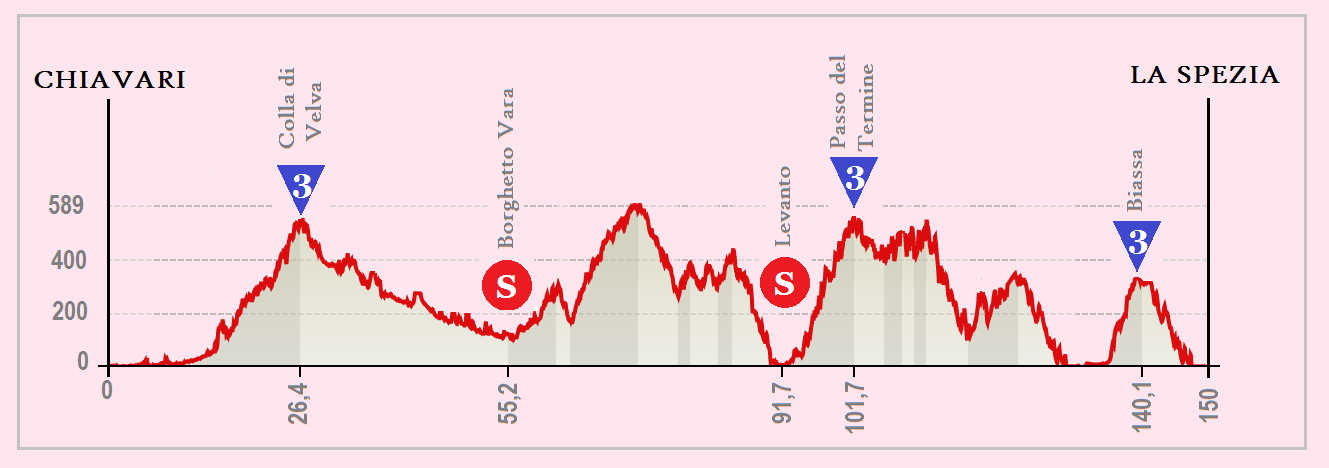
Stage 4 profile

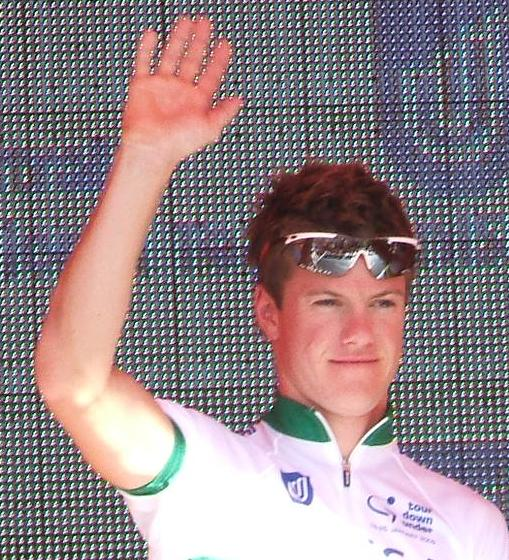
Simon Clarke wore the maglia rosa thanks to his second placing on the stage

The second of three consecutive medium mountain stages took the riders on a short and technical course. The stage featured a series of climbs - the third category Colla di Velva, the uncategorised Passo del Bracco, the third category Passo del Termine and the third category ascent of Biassa. After passing through the finish line for the first time, the riders took a lap on a 17.1-kilometre (10.6-mile) circuit where they tackled the ascent of Biassa before taking on the 10-kilometre (6.2-mile) descent and flat ride to the finish. The finish at La Spezia was last featured in 1989 when Laurent Fignon won the stage en route to winning the Giro.

For the second successive day, the breakaway featured a huge number of riders as 30 riders joined the break. The biggest surprise from the breakaway was Roman Kreuziger of Tinkoff–Saxo, one of Alberto Contador's main lieutenants in the mountains. Despite Kreuziger's presence, the breakaway was allowed to establish a lead of around 10 minutes. Astana soon dictated the pace on the ascent of Passo del Termine and their pace decimated the peloton. Several riders fell off the back of the peloton including the maglia rosa wearer Michael Matthews. Astana's pace was able to reduce the peloton to only around 20 riders and the breakaway's advantage continually decreased as the stage wore on.

As the final climb to Biassa was approaching, Davide Formolo made his move for Cannondale–Garmin, whose general classification hopes was dashed when Ryder Hesjedal was distanced on the climb of Passo del Termine. Giovanni Visconti and Amaël Moinard tried to follow his move but Formolo continued to increase his advantage. On the climb of Biassa itself, the first attack of the general classification contenders was made when Fabio Aru accelerated. He was followed by Contador and Richie Porte while Rigoberto Urán found himself unable to follow their pace. The trio of general classification contenders were able to catch the remnants of the breakaway while Formolo continued to stay out front. Visconti and Moinard eventually failed in their bid to catch Formolo as the chase group caught them. Formolo eventually soloed to his first professional win by 22 seconds ahead of the remaining breakaway riders plus the trio of general classification contenders. Aru tried to sprint for bonus seconds but it was Simon Clarke and Jonathan Monsalve who took the remaining time bonuses. Clarke celebrated as he crossed the finish line, unaware that Formolo already won the stage, before Visconti pointed out that Formolo was the stage winner. Clarke later clarified that his jubilation was for having continued his team's dominance at the Giro. Clarke, however, took the maglia rosa as the new leader of the general classification.

Stage 4 result

	Rider	Team	Time
1	Davide Formolo (ITA)	Cannondale–Garmin	3h 47' 59"
2	Simon Clarke (AUS)	Orica–GreenEDGE	+ 22"
3	Jonathan Monsalve (VEN)	Southeast Pro Cycling	+ 22"
4	Giovanni Visconti (ITA)	Movistar Team	+ 22"
5	Esteban Chaves (COL)	Orica–GreenEDGE	+ 22"
6	Fabio Aru (ITA)	Astana	+ 22"
7	Amaël Moinard (FRA)	BMC Racing Team	+ 22"
8	Dario Cataldo (ITA)	Astana	+ 22"
9	Alberto Contador (ESP)	Tinkoff–Saxo	+ 22"
10	Richie Porte (AUS)	Team Sky	+ 22"

General classification after Stage 4

	Rider	Team	Time
1	Simon Clarke (AUS)	Orica–GreenEDGE	11h 54' 48"
2	Esteban Chaves (COL)	Orica–GreenEDGE	+ 10"
3	Roman Kreuziger (CZE)	Tinkoff–Saxo	+ 17"
4	Alberto Contador (ESP)	Tinkoff–Saxo	+ 17"
5	Fabio Aru (ITA)	Astana	+ 23"
6	Dario Cataldo (ITA)	Astana	+ 23"
7	Giovanni Visconti (ITA)	Movistar Team	+ 29"
8	Amaël Moinard (FRA)	BMC Racing Team	+ 31"
9	Davide Formolo (ITA)	Cannondale–Garmin	+ 31"
10	Richie Porte (AUS)	Team Sky	+ 37"

== Stage 5 ==
13 May 2015 — La Spezia to Abetone, 152 km (94.4 mi)

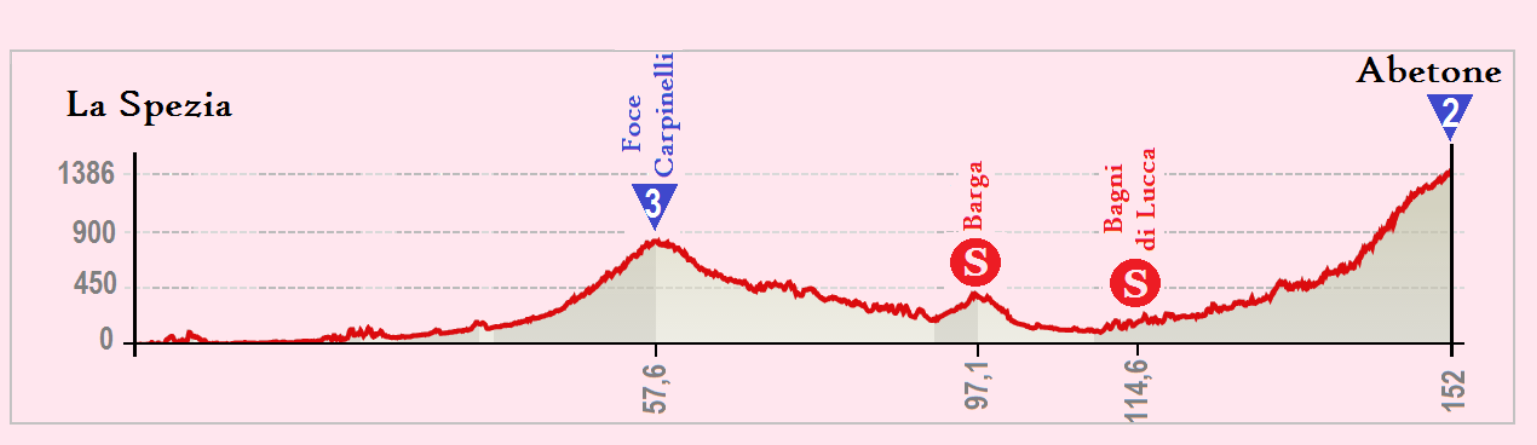
Stage 5 profile

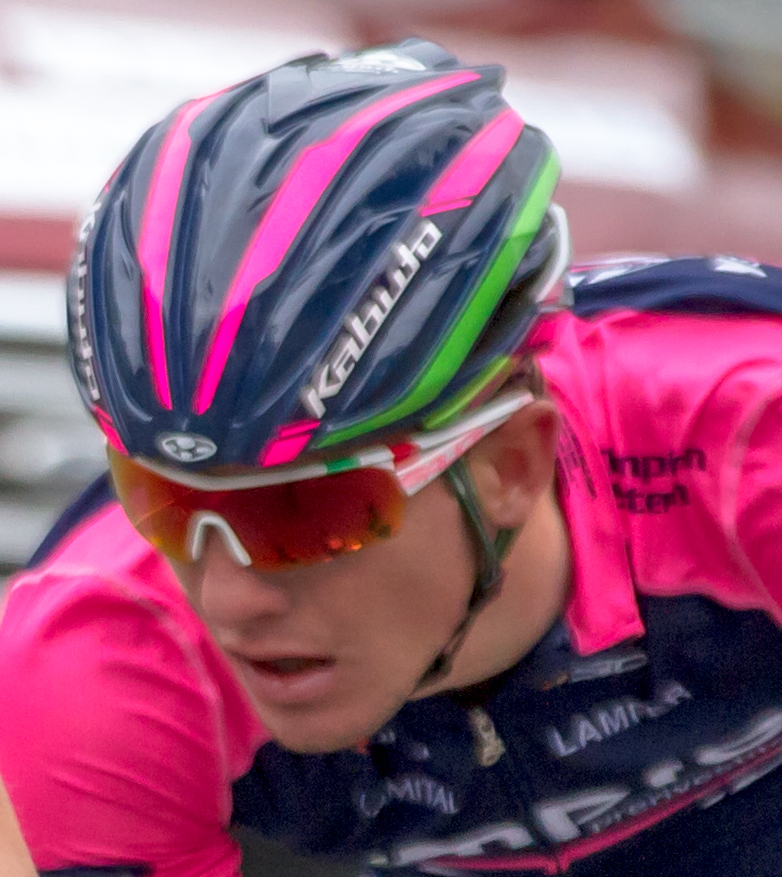
Jan Polanc won the first mountaintop finish of the Giro in solo fashion

After four tough stages, the race headed to its first mountain finish. The stage was expected to be the first showdown between the main contenders as they battled it out for time gaps in the general classification. Before undertaking the final climb, the riders tackled the 10-kilometre (6.2-mile) climb of Foce Carpinelli first 47.5 kilometres (29.5 miles) into the stage. Following the descent, the course gradually went uphill with around 40 kilometres (24.9 miles) left before the climb of Abetone officially started 17.3 kilometres (10.7 miles) from the finish. The early segment of the climb averaged only 2.8% before the riders undertook the most difficult section of the climb which averaged 7.2%. The finishing kilometres approaching the summit eased up a bit, averaging 4.7%.

No riders were able to break clear until after 16 kilometres (9.9 miles) when the day's breakaway was finally formed, consisting of AG2R La Mondiale's Axel Domont, Androni Giocattoli–Sidermec's Serghei Țvetcov, BMC Racing Team's Silvan Dillier, IAM Cycling's Sylvain Chavanel and Lampre–Merida's Jan Polanc. The peloton let their advantage go up to around 11 minutes before Orica–GreenEDGE led the chase. As the stage wore on, it became more likely that the breakaway could survive to the end. The breakaway continued to work together and by the time they started the climb of Abetone, they had an advantage of 5' 33" over the peloton. Chavanel was the first to attack in the breakaway but he was chased down by his fellow breakaway companions. Țvetcov was eventually gapped by Chavanel's attack.

Chavanel tried to attack again but the strongest from the remaining breakaway riders was Polanc, who gradually built a gap. Chavanel tried to chase him but Polanc increased his advantage. From behind, Diego Rosa was the first to attack and he was chased by Ivan Basso. After both were caught, Stefano Pirazzi and Mikel Landa had a go but neither rider could build a substantial gap and both were eventually caught. At this point, maglia rosa wearer Simon Clarke was dropped. Just as the peloton rode through the most difficult section of the climb, Alberto Contador attacked and only Fabio Aru and Richie Porte could follow him. Another general classification contender, Rigoberto Urán, could not follow the trio as he would lose 28 seconds by the stage's end. Porte and Aru traded attacks but each time, the attacks would be nullified. Landa would join the elite group of riders, forming a quartet of chasers. Back at the front, Polanc gradually built his advantage before soloing to the stage win. Contador, Porte, Aru and Landa caught every remnant of the breakaway before the trio of contenders tried to sprint for bonus seconds, dropping Landa in the process. Chavanel was caught shortly before the finish but he hung on for second place, 1' 31" back, with Aru outsprinting Contador and Porte to take the 4-second time bonus for third place. The peloton finished the stage scattered behind and as a result, Contador became the new maglia rosa wearer with Aru in second, only 2 seconds behind him and Porte in third, a further 18 seconds back.

Stage 5 result

	Rider	Team	Time
1	Jan Polanc (SLO)	Lampre–Merida	4h 09' 18"
2	Sylvain Chavanel (FRA)	IAM Cycling	+ 1' 31"
3	Fabio Aru (ITA)	Astana	+ 1' 31"
4	Alberto Contador (ESP)	Tinkoff–Saxo	+ 1' 31"
5	Richie Porte (AUS)	Team Sky	+ 1' 31"
6	Mikel Landa (ESP)	Astana	+ 1' 44"
7	Dario Cataldo (ITA)	Astana	+ 1' 53"
8	Yuri Trofimov (RUS)	Team Katusha	+ 1' 53"
9	Damiano Caruso (ITA)	BMC Racing Team	+ 1' 53"
10	Darwin Atapuma (COL)	BMC Racing Team	+ 1' 53"

General classification after Stage 5

	Rider	Team	Time
1	Alberto Contador (ESP)	Tinkoff–Saxo	16h 05' 54"
2	Fabio Aru (ITA)	Astana	+ 2"
3	Richie Porte (AUS)	Team Sky	+ 20"
4	Roman Kreuziger (CZE)	Tinkoff–Saxo	+ 22"
5	Dario Cataldo (ITA)	Astana	+ 28"
6	Esteban Chaves (COL)	Orica–GreenEDGE	+ 37"
7	Giovanni Visconti (ITA)	Movistar Team	+ 56"
8	Mikel Landa (ESP)	Astana	+ 1' 01"
9	Davide Formolo (ITA)	Cannondale–Garmin	+ 1' 15"
10	Andrey Amador (CRC)	Movistar Team	+ 1' 18"

== Stage 6 ==
14 May 2015 — Montecatini Terme to Castiglione della Pescaia, 183 km (113.7 mi)

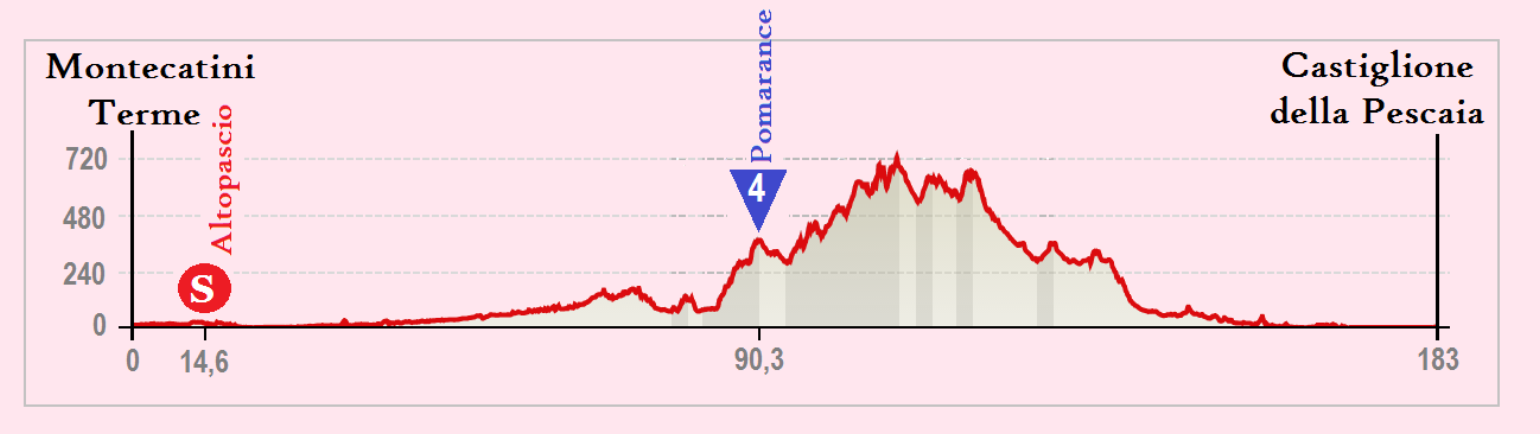
Stage 6 profile

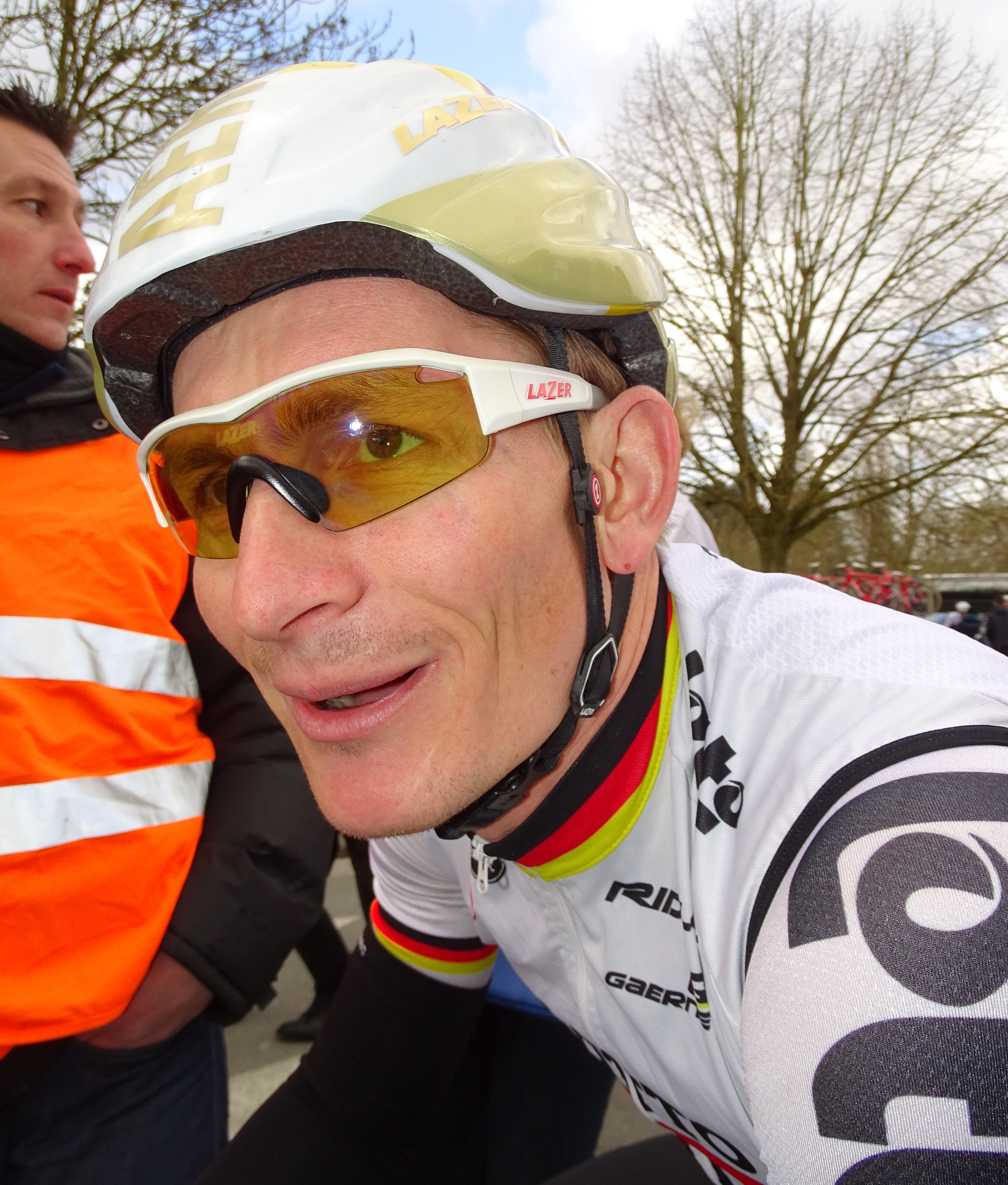
André Greipel grabbed the victory in the mass sprint of Stage 6

After three successive tough stages, the race headed from Montecatini Terme to Castiglione della Pescaia in a day for the sprinters. The stage was mostly flat except for the middle sector where the short fourth category climb of Pomarance was found. The middle sector was undulating, featuring short climbs, before the riders tackled a long descent and a final flat stretch to the finish.

Two breakaways were formed at different times. The first riders to attack were CCC–Sprandi–Polkowice's Marek Rutkiewicz and Nippo–Vini Fantini's Eduard-Michael Grosu, attacking after 2 kilometres (1.2 miles) had passed before Androni Giocattoli–Sidermec's Marco Bandiera, Nippo–Vini Fantini's Alessandro Malaguti and Cannondale–Garmin's Alan Marangoni joined them after 20 kilometres (12 miles). Tinkoff–Saxo had hoped the someone in the break could take Alberto Contador's pink jersey but the sprinters' teams, namely Lotto–Soudal, IAM Cycling, Trek Factory Racing and Team Giant–Alpecin, worked hard to keep the break under control. The breakaway's lead maxed at around five minutes before it started to go down to around three minutes at the final intermediate sprint. At this point, news of headwinds and side winds broke out and as a result of the winds, the breakaway's lead quickly went down and with 14 kilometres (8.7 miles) left in the stage, all riders were together again.

Soon, the teams of the general classification contenders, namely Tinkoff–Saxo, Astana and Team Sky, worked at the front to keep their team leaders out of trouble. As the peloton passed the banner signalling 3 kilometres (1.9 miles) remaining, the sprinters' teams went at the front to build their lead-out trains. In the finishing sprint, a crash took down several riders, including Contador. The crash was caused by Italy's Daniele Colli colliding with a spectator's camera lens, causing Colli to suffer a broken arm. As the chaos scattered behind, Greg Henderson perfectly led out André Greipel as Greipel took the stage win, his third at the Giro. With the win, Greipel took the red jersey to lead the points classification. With the crash happening inside the final 3 kilometres (1.9 miles), the general classification remained unchanged but Contador's challenge for the Giro was put in doubt after X-rays discovered that Contador dislocated his left shoulder in the crash. His injury prevented him from putting on the pink jersey during the podium presentations. Nonetheless, Contador stated that he would try to continue riding the Giro despite the injury.

Stage 6 result

	Rider	Team	Time
1	André Greipel (GER)	Lotto–Soudal	4h 19' 42"
2	Matteo Pelucchi (ITA)	IAM Cycling	+ 0"
3	Sacha Modolo (ITA)	Lampre–Merida	+ 0"
4	Manuel Belletti (ITA)	Southeast Pro Cycling	+ 0"
5	Giacomo Nizzolo (ITA)	Trek Factory Racing	+ 0"
6	Alessandro Petacchi (ITA)	Southeast Pro Cycling	+ 0"
7	Elia Viviani (ITA)	Team Sky	+ 0"
8	Luka Mezgec (SLO)	Team Giant–Alpecin	+ 0"
9	Nicola Ruffoni (ITA)	Bardiani–CSF	+ 0"
10	Davide Appollonio (ITA)	Androni Giocattoli–Sidermec	+ 0"

General classification after Stage 6

	Rider	Team	Time
1	Alberto Contador (ESP)	Tinkoff–Saxo	20h 25' 36"
2	Fabio Aru (ITA)	Astana	+ 2"
3	Richie Porte (AUS)	Team Sky	+ 20"
4	Roman Kreuziger (CZE)	Tinkoff–Saxo	+ 22"
5	Dario Cataldo (ITA)	Astana	+ 28"
6	Esteban Chaves (COL)	Orica–GreenEDGE	+ 37"
7	Giovanni Visconti (ITA)	Movistar Team	+ 56"
8	Mikel Landa (ESP)	Astana	+ 1' 01"
9	Davide Formolo (ITA)	Cannondale–Garmin	+ 1' 15"
10	Andrey Amador (CRC)	Movistar Team	+ 1' 18"

== Stage 7 ==
15 May 2015 — Grosseto to Fiuggi, 264 km (164.0 mi)

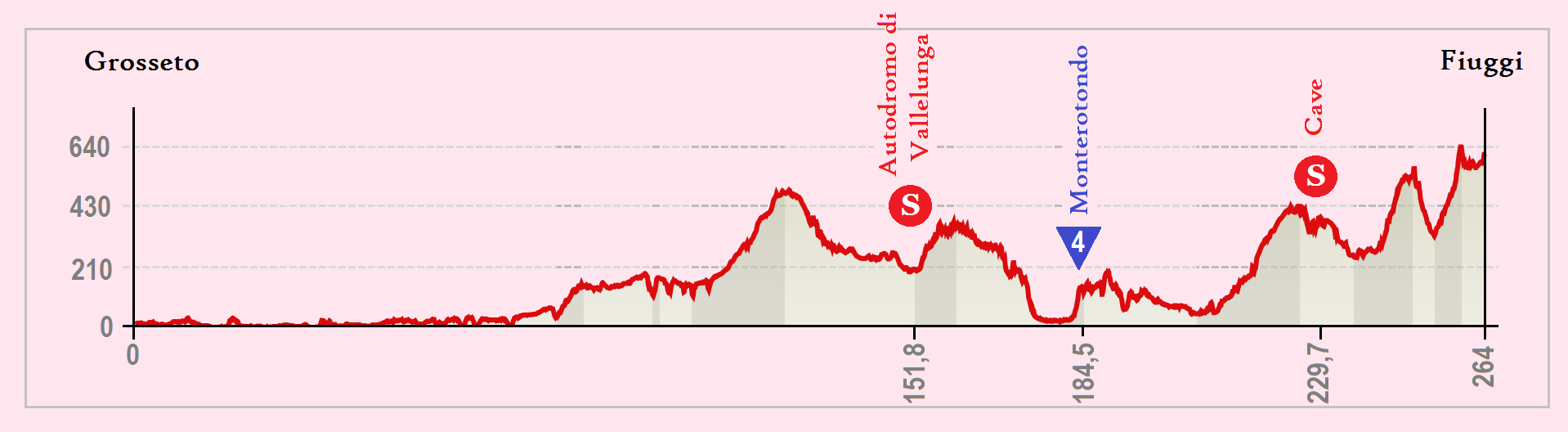
Stage 7 profile

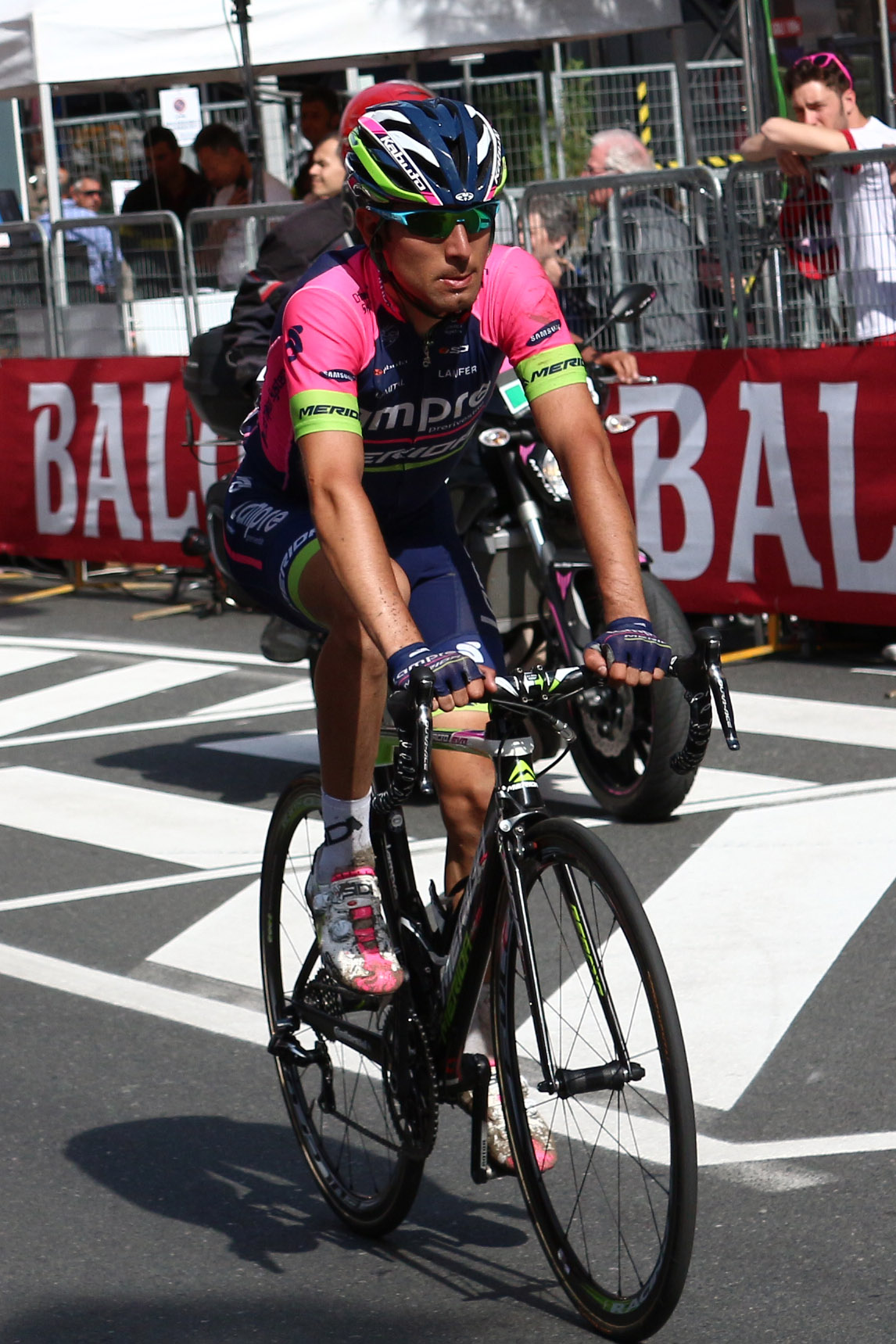
Diego Ulissi took the victory on the slightly uphill finish in Fiuggi

At 264 kilometres (164 miles) long, the course featured the longest stage of the Giro d'Italia since 2000. The route only featured one categorised climb - the fourth category Monterotondo. Despite that, there were other uncategorised climbs during the course which made it difficult for the pure sprinters to survive for a final sprint. The stage was expected to be won by a puncheur or a rouleur.

Despite suffering a shoulder injury, Alberto Contador was able to start the stage. The day's break was formed by four riders, consisting of Androni Giocattoli–Sidermec's Marco Bandiera, Bardiani–CSF's Nicola Boem, Nippo–Vini Fantini's Pierpaolo De Negri and CCC–Sprandi–Polkowice's Nikolay Mihaylov. The peloton let them have an advantage of around 10 minutes with Tinkoff–Saxo controlling the chase and protecting Contador. Due to a strong headwind, the peloton's pace averaged only around 35 kilometres per hour (22 mph). Bandiera took maximum points at the intermediate sprint, after which he pulled out a piece of paper to wish his father a "happy birthday". The break's advantage eventually began to fall quickly after BMC Racing Team hit the front of the peloton.

Bandiera once again took maximum points at the second intermediate sprint but the break was caught with 21 kilometres (13 miles) left. Tinkoff–Saxo, once again, kept station at the front to protect Contador from any danger. Several sprinters fell off the back once the peloton reached the final stretch of the stage. The previous day's stage winner, André Greipel, tried to stay with the peloton but he also fell off the back. Michael Matthews sacrificed his chances for Simon Gerrans but they were not well-placed for the sprint. Eventually, it was Diego Ulissi who came to the front. No one was able to match his speed as he won his first stage since his nine-month suspension. Contador and the other general classification favourites finished safely within the peloton and as a result, Contador kept the maglia rosa.

Stage 7 result

	Rider	Team	Time
1	Diego Ulissi (ITA)	Lampre–Merida	7h 22' 21"
2	Juan José Lobato (ESP)	Movistar Team	+ 0"
3	Simon Gerrans (AUS)	Orica–GreenEDGE	+ 0"
4	Manuel Belletti (ITA)	Southeast Pro Cycling	+ 0"
5	Enrico Battaglin (ITA)	Bardiani–CSF	+ 0"
6	Sonny Colbrelli (ITA)	Bardiani–CSF	+ 0"
7	Fabio Felline (ITA)	Trek Factory Racing	+ 0"
8	Grega Bole (SLO)	CCC–Sprandi–Polkowice	+ 0"
9	Kévin Reza (FRA)	FDJ	+ 0"
10	Sergey Lagutin (RUS)	Team Katusha	+ 0"

General classification after Stage 7

	Rider	Team	Time
1	Alberto Contador (ESP)	Tinkoff–Saxo	27h 48' 00"
2	Fabio Aru (ITA)	Astana	+ 2"
3	Richie Porte (AUS)	Team Sky	+ 20"
4	Roman Kreuziger (CZE)	Tinkoff–Saxo	+ 22"
5	Dario Cataldo (ITA)	Astana	+ 28"
6	Esteban Chaves (COL)	Orica–GreenEDGE	+ 37"
7	Giovanni Visconti (ITA)	Movistar Team	+ 56"
8	Mikel Landa (ESP)	Astana	+ 1' 01"
9	Davide Formolo (ITA)	Cannondale–Garmin	+ 1' 15"
10	Andrey Amador (CRC)	Movistar Team	+ 1' 18"

== Stage 8 ==
16 May 2015 — Fiuggi to Campitello Matese, 186 km (115.6 mi)

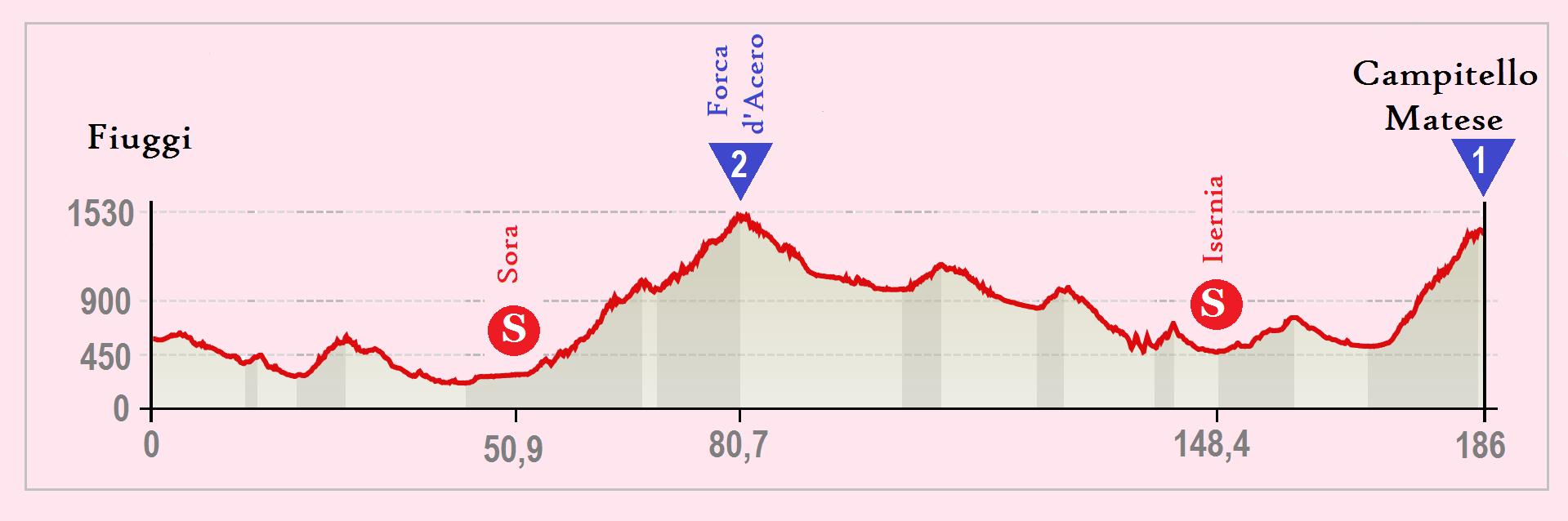
Stage 8 profile

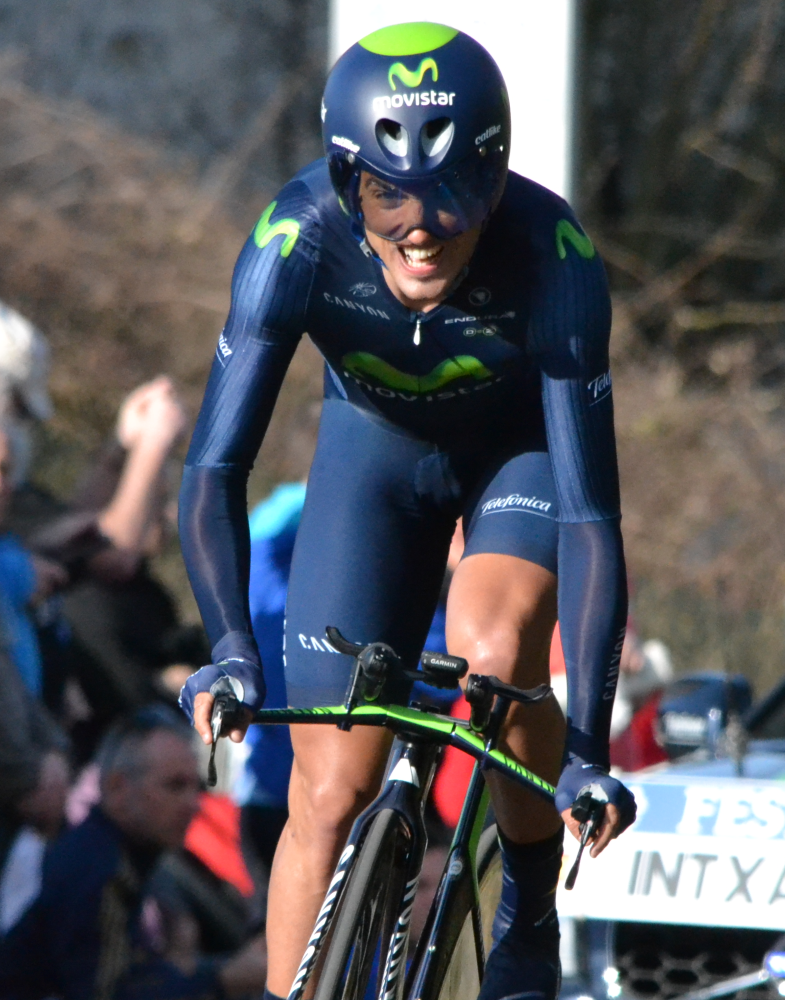
Beñat Intxausti (pictured at Paris–Nice earlier in 2015) won the second summit finish of the race

The stage featured the second summit finish of the race. The riders did tackle two climbs on the course - the second category Forca d'Acero and the first category Campitello Matese. The climb of Forca d'Acero was around 29 kilometres (18 miles) long and topped at approximately 106 kilometres (66 miles) to the finish. The ascent of Campitello Matese was 13.6 kilometres (8.5 miles) long and featured an average gradient of 6.5%. The latter climb was expected to feature another showdown between the main general classification contenders. The stage also featured the first main test for Alberto Contador's left shoulder after his crash two days earlier.

The first kilometres of the stage featured some riders trying to break clear of the peloton but each time, the peloton would catch them. At one point during the stage, the peloton split and maglia rosa wearer, Contador, found himself in a second group at one minute behind the other main general classification contenders. However, the second group managed to bridge over the gap and Contador was even able to increase his lead over Aru in the general classification to 4 seconds after he took time bonuses in the intermediate sprint. At this point, Steven Kruijswijk of LottoNL–Jumbo attacked and he was chased by ten riders as the peloton eased up the pace. Kruijswijk was able to build an advantage but he was chased by AG2R La Mondiale's Carlos Betancur, Androni Giocattoli–Sidermec's Franco Pellizotti and Trek Factory Racing's Kristof Vandewalle. The peloton let the quartet build an advantage of around 9 minutes and soon, Pellizotti was dropped to the chasing group. The peloton slowly decreased their advantage with Astana setting a very fast pace.

On the lower slopes of the climb, Betancur tried to go solo but Kruijswijk responded with a counter-attack that dropped Betancur. From behind in the chasing group, Sébastien Reichenbach and Beñat Intxausti attacked to catch Kruijswijk. They passed Kruijswijk with around 4 kilometres (2.5 miles) to go. From behind in the peloton, Fabio Aru attacked. At first, only his teammate, Mikel Landa was able to follow him but Contador, Richie Porte, Rigoberto Urán and others were able to chase them. Landa eventually went in pursuit of the stage win and after some time, Damiano Cunego attacked as well. Aru and Porte tried to throw in more attacks but Contador and Uran would be able to follow them. Up front, Reichenbach seemed to put Intxausti in difficulty when Intxausti attacked for the win. He would not be caught as he took another Giro stage win. Landa went across the line 20 seconds behind in second while Reichenbach finished in third place, 11 seconds further back. The four main general classification favourites, along with Dario Cataldo, finished together as Contador stayed in pink.

Stage 8 result

	Rider	Team	Time
1	Beñat Intxausti (ESP)	Movistar Team	4h 51' 34"
2	Mikel Landa (ESP)	Astana	+ 20"
3	Sébastien Reichenbach (SUI)	IAM Cycling	+ 31"
4	Fabio Aru (ITA)	Astana	+ 35"
5	Alberto Contador (ESP)	Tinkoff–Saxo	+ 35"
6	Richie Porte (AUS)	Team Sky	+ 35"
7	Rigoberto Urán (COL)	Etixx–Quick-Step	+ 35"
8	Dario Cataldo (ITA)	Astana	+ 35"
9	Damiano Cunego (ITA)	Nippo–Vini Fantini	+ 45"
10	Damiano Caruso (ITA)	BMC Racing Team	+ 45"

General classification after Stage 8

	Rider	Team	Time
1	Alberto Contador (ESP)	Tinkoff–Saxo	32h 40' 07"
2	Fabio Aru (ITA)	Astana	+ 4"
3	Richie Porte (AUS)	Team Sky	+ 22"
4	Dario Cataldo (ITA)	Astana	+ 30"
5	Mikel Landa (ESP)	Astana	+ 42"
6	Roman Kreuziger (CZE)	Tinkoff–Saxo	+ 1' 00"
7	Giovanni Visconti (ITA)	Movistar Team	+ 1' 16"
8	Rigoberto Urán (COL)	Etixx–Quick-Step	+ 1' 24"
9	Damiano Caruso (ITA)	BMC Racing Team	+ 1' 34"
10	Andrey Amador (CRC)	Movistar Team	+ 1' 38"

== Stage 9 ==
17 May 2015 — Benevento to San Giorgio del Sannio, 224 km (139.2 mi)

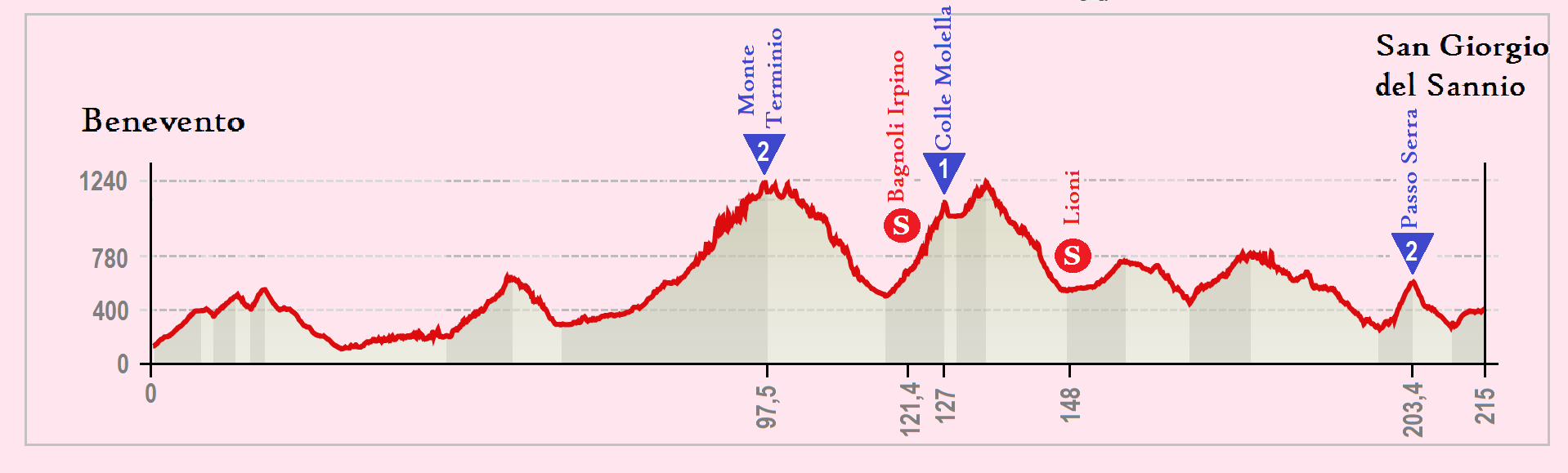
Stage 9 profile

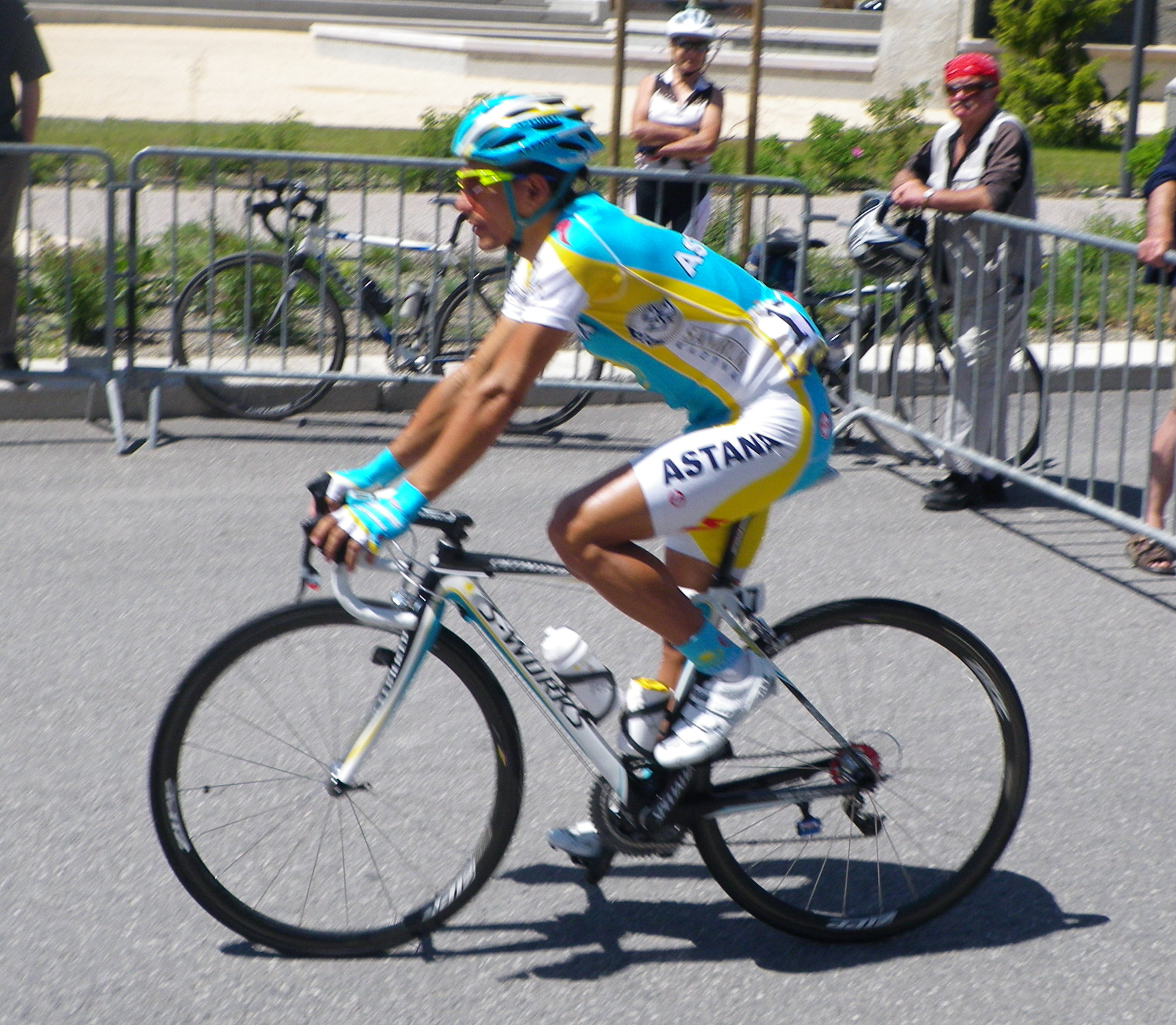
Paolo Tiralongo prevailed during this mountainous stage, soloing to victory in San Giorgio del Sannio

After a hard day in the mountains, the riders faced around 4,000 metres of vertical climbing during the stage. The route featured 3 climbs - the second category Monte Terminio, the first category Colle Molella and the second category Passo Serra. The first ascent to Monte Terminio was expected to possibly take out the non-climbers while the crucial portion of the stage was expected to be the ascent of Passo Serra, which topped out with around 12 kilometres (7.5 miles) to the finish.

The whole group of riders stayed together until the 52-kilometre (32-mile) mark when 11 riders broke clear to form the day's breakaway. In terms of the general classification, the best-placed men in the breakaway were Amaël Moinard, who was at 4' 45" back in the general classification, and Ryder Hesjedal, who was at 6' 49" back of the pink jersey of Alberto Contador. The peloton allowed the gap to reach 5' 53" at the top of the climb of Monte Terminio, at which point Moinard was the virtual maglia rosa. On the descent, Sérgio Paulinho attacked from the peloton but he was unable to keep his lead and soon, he dropped back to the peloton. Up front, Simon Geschke took the first two KOM sprints to take the blue jersey and on the descent of Colle Molella, Dario Cataldo of Astana attacked from the peloton but Tinkoff–Saxo brought him back. Soon, Tom-Jelte Slagter attacked the lead group and he was able to build a gap, taking the second intermediate sprint in the process.

On the descent, a motorcycle crashed on a sharp curve, causing the peloton to slow down in the process. With 50 kilometres (31 miles) to go, the advantage of Slagter over the peloton was increased to nearly 6 minutes. In the chasing group, Paolo Tiralongo and Jesús Herrada attacked but they were brought back. Kenny Elissonde was next to attack and he was chased by Tiralongo but they were brought back as well. Tiralongo attacked again on the ascent of Passo Serra and this time, he was able to pull away. Back in the peloton, Tinkoff–Saxo picked up the pace to reduce Slagter's advantage. On the climb of Passo Serra, Fabio Aru attacked and he was quickly chased down by Contador, Richie Porte and Mikel Landa. Rigoberto Urán struggled once again as he was unable to follow the attacks. Back at the front, with 8.1 kilometres (5.0 miles) left, Tiralongo caught Slagter and after a while, Slagter was dropped and Tiralongo was soon on his own. From the remnants of the break, Steven Kruijswijk attacked in pursuit of Tiralongo but Tiralongo stayed out front, winning the stage solo. Kruijswijk was 21 seconds behind when he crossed the finish line in second and the remnants of the break finished 2 to 6 seconds further back. From the group of the maglia rosa, the four riders worked together to distance Urán further. As the elite group of favourites closed in on the finish, Aru sprinted to take some seconds and he was able to gain one second on Contador and Porte. Urán finished 46 seconds behind Contador and as a result, he fell to 2' 10" behind Contador in the general classification. Contador, meanwhile, saw his lead drop to 3 seconds over Aru as Contador stayed in pink ahead of the first rest day.

Stage 9 result

	Rider	Team	Time
1	Paolo Tiralongo (ITA)	Astana	5h 50' 31"
2	Steven Kruijswijk (NED)	LottoNL–Jumbo	+ 21"
3	Simon Geschke (GER)	Team Giant–Alpecin	+ 23"
4	Amaël Moinard (FRA)	BMC Racing Team	+ 23"
5	Jesús Herrada (ESP)	Movistar Team	+ 23"
6	Carlos Betancur (COL)	AG2R La Mondiale	+ 23"
7	Tom-Jelte Slagter (NED)	Cannondale–Garmin	+ 23"
8	Kenny Elissonde (FRA)	FDJ	+ 23"
9	Ryder Hesjedal (CAN)	Cannondale–Garmin	+ 27"
10	Fabio Aru (ITA)	Astana	+ 56"

General classification after Stage 9

	Rider	Team	Time
1	Alberto Contador (ESP)	Tinkoff–Saxo	38h 31' 35"
2	Fabio Aru (ITA)	Astana	+ 3"
3	Richie Porte (AUS)	Team Sky	+ 22"
4	Mikel Landa (ESP)	Astana	+ 46"
5	Dario Cataldo (ITA)	Astana	+ 1' 16"
6	Roman Kreuziger (CZE)	Tinkoff–Saxo	+ 1' 46"
7	Giovanni Visconti (ITA)	Movistar Team	+ 2' 02"
8	Rigoberto Urán (COL)	Etixx–Quick-Step	+ 2' 10"
9	Damiano Caruso (ITA)	BMC Racing Team	+ 2' 20"
10	Andrey Amador (CRC)	Movistar Team	+ 2' 24"

== Stage 10 ==
19 May 2015 — Civitanova Marche to Forlì, 200 km (124.3 mi)

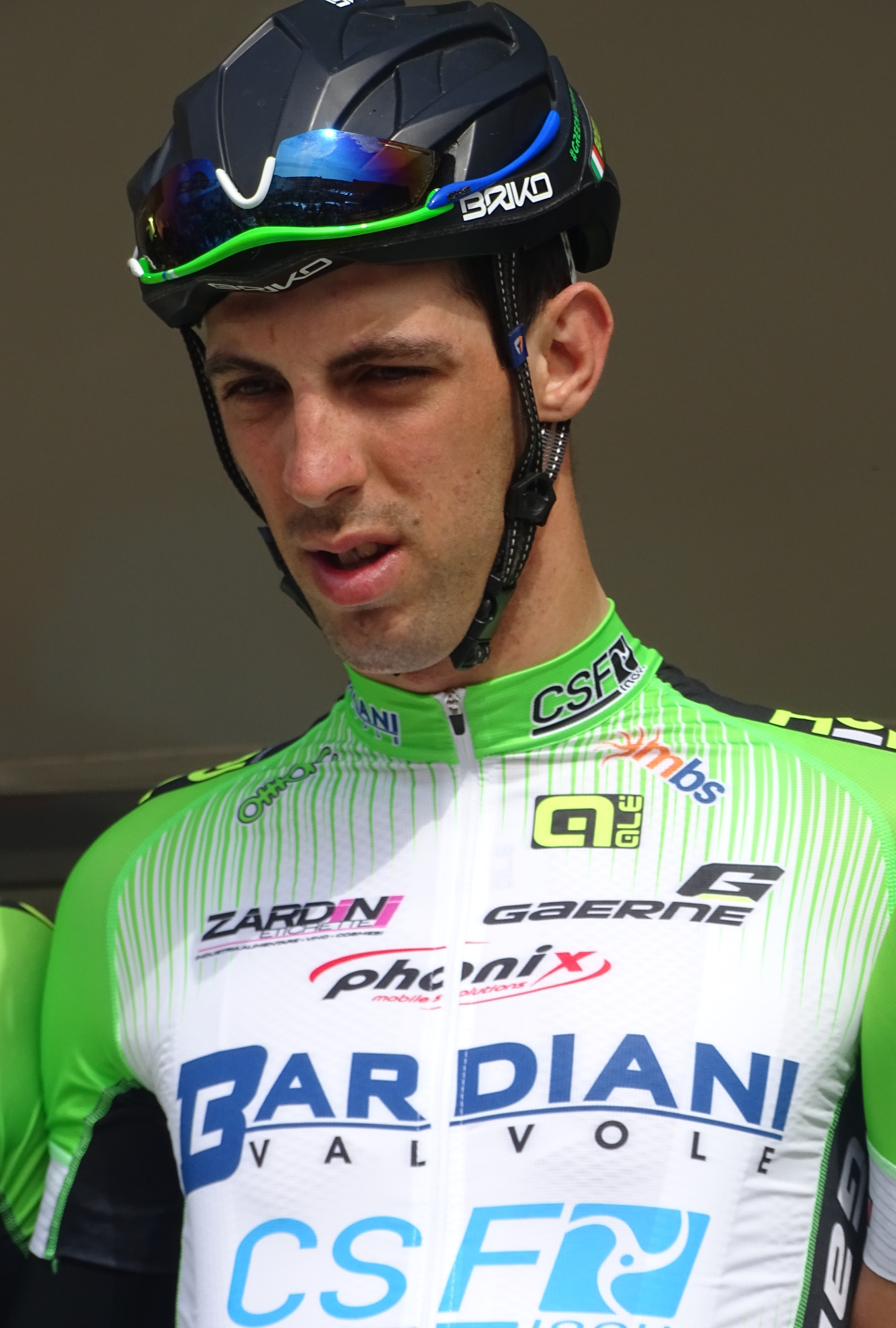
Italian Nicola Boem won Stage 10 out of the breakaway

The second week of the Giro started with an entirely flat stage that was expected to end in a bunch sprint. The riders were taken across the Adriatica coastal road and located in the middle of the stage was the fourth category climb of Monte di Bartolo which was 4.8 kilometres (3.0 miles) long with an average gradient of 3.5%. From there on, the stage was entirely flat until the finish in Forlì. The last time Forlì hosted a Giro stage finish was in 2006 when Robbie McEwen won the sixth stage in a bunch sprint.

The day's breakaway was formed by an all-Italian group, consisting of Bardiani–CSF's Nicola Boem, Nippo–Vini Fantini's Alessandro Malaguti, Southeast Pro Cycling's Matteo Busato, Cannondale–Garmin's Alan Marangoni and Androni Giocattoli–Sidermec's Oscar Gatto. The breakaway was able to establish a lead of around 5 minutes before the sprinters' teams began to chip into the lead. Despite the sprinters' teams' desire to catch the break, the five-man breakaway was not ready to give up as their gap hovered at around 2 to 3 minutes during the flat ride to the finish. Noticing that the peloton was not moving quick enough, BMC Racing Team and AG2R La Mondiale sent riders to attack but the break's lead remained relatively healthy.

Back at the front, the five continued to work together but with around 13 kilometres (8.1 miles) remaining, Gatto suffered a mechanical, causing him to drop back to the peloton. With around 5 kilometres (3.1 miles) to go, the gap to the breakaway was a minute but with the breakaway helped by a tailwind, it seemed more and more likely that the breakaway would survive. As the break closed in on the finish line, Marangoni attacked for the stage win but he would be caught close to the finish. Eventually, it was Boem who outsprinted Busato for the stage win. With the stage win, Boem took the red jersey as leader of the points classification. Giacomo Nizzolo led the peloton across the line 18 seconds later as Alberto Contador kept the maglia rosa. However, one rider notably absent from the group was Richie Porte, as he suffered a flat tyre with around 7 kilometres (4.3 miles) to go. Despite Team Sky's efforts to bridge the gap to the peloton, Porte lost 47 seconds on the day to drop him to fourth place in the general classification. Later in the day, he was given a two-minute penalty for an illegal wheel change – he had received a wheel from fellow Australian, Orica–GreenEDGE's Simon Clarke. As a result, Porte dropped out of the top 10 and he was now 3' 09" behind Contador in the general classification.

Stage 10 result

	Rider	Team	Time
1	Nicola Boem (ITA)	Bardiani–CSF	4h 26' 16"
2	Matteo Busato (ITA)	Southeast Pro Cycling	+ 0"
3	Alessandro Malaguti (ITA)	Nippo–Vini Fantini	+ 2"
4	Alan Marangoni (ITA)	Cannondale–Garmin	+ 4"
5	Giacomo Nizzolo (ITA)	Trek Factory Racing	+ 18"
6	Sacha Modolo (ITA)	Lampre–Merida	+ 18"
7	André Greipel (GER)	Lotto–Soudal	+ 18"
8	Luka Mezgec (SLO)	Team Giant–Alpecin	+ 18"
9	Nicola Ruffoni (ITA)	Bardiani–CSF	+ 18"
10	Davide Appollonio (ITA)	Androni Giocattoli–Sidermec	+ 18"

General classification after Stage 10

	Rider	Team	Time
1	Alberto Contador (ESP)	Tinkoff–Saxo	42h 58' 09"
2	Fabio Aru (ITA)	Astana	+ 3"
3	Mikel Landa (ESP)	Astana	+ 46"
4	Dario Cataldo (ITA)	Astana	+ 1' 16"
5	Roman Kreuziger (CZE)	Tinkoff–Saxo	+ 1' 46"
6	Rigoberto Urán (COL)	Etixx–Quick-Step	+ 2' 10"
7	Giovanni Visconti (ITA)	Movistar Team	+ 2' 12"
8	Damiano Caruso (ITA)	BMC Racing Team	+ 2' 20"
9	Andrey Amador (CRC)	Movistar Team	+ 2' 24"
10	Leopold König (CZE)	Team Sky	+ 2' 30"

== Stage 11 ==
20 May 2015 — Forlì to Imola (Imola Circuit), 153 km (95.1 mi)

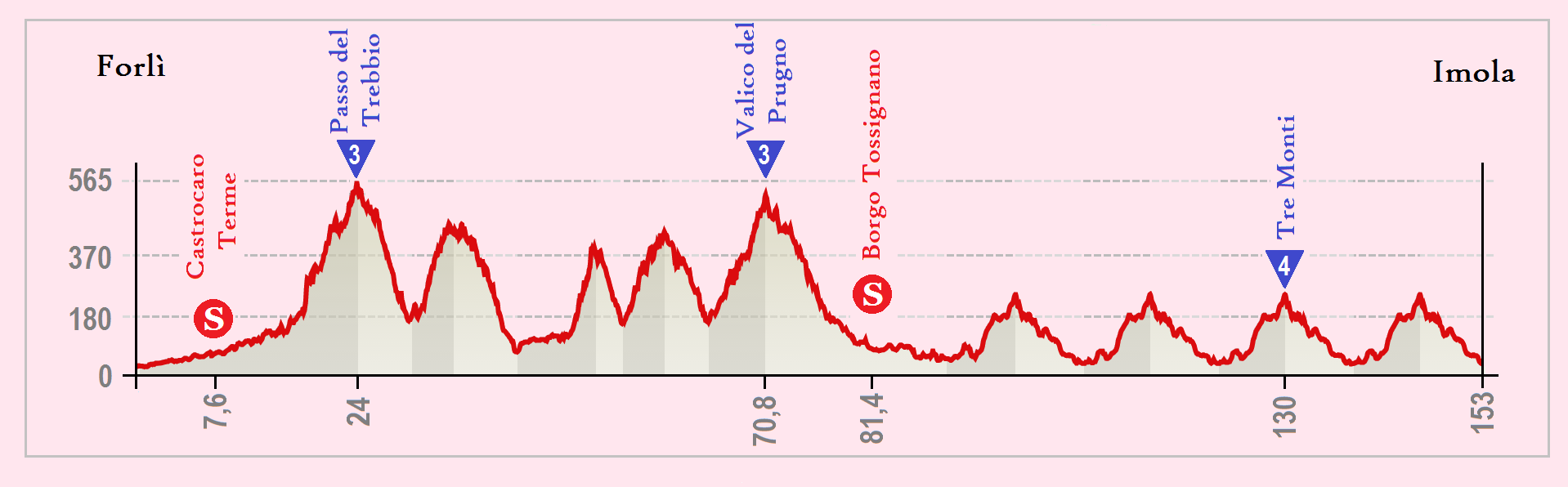
Stage 11 profile.

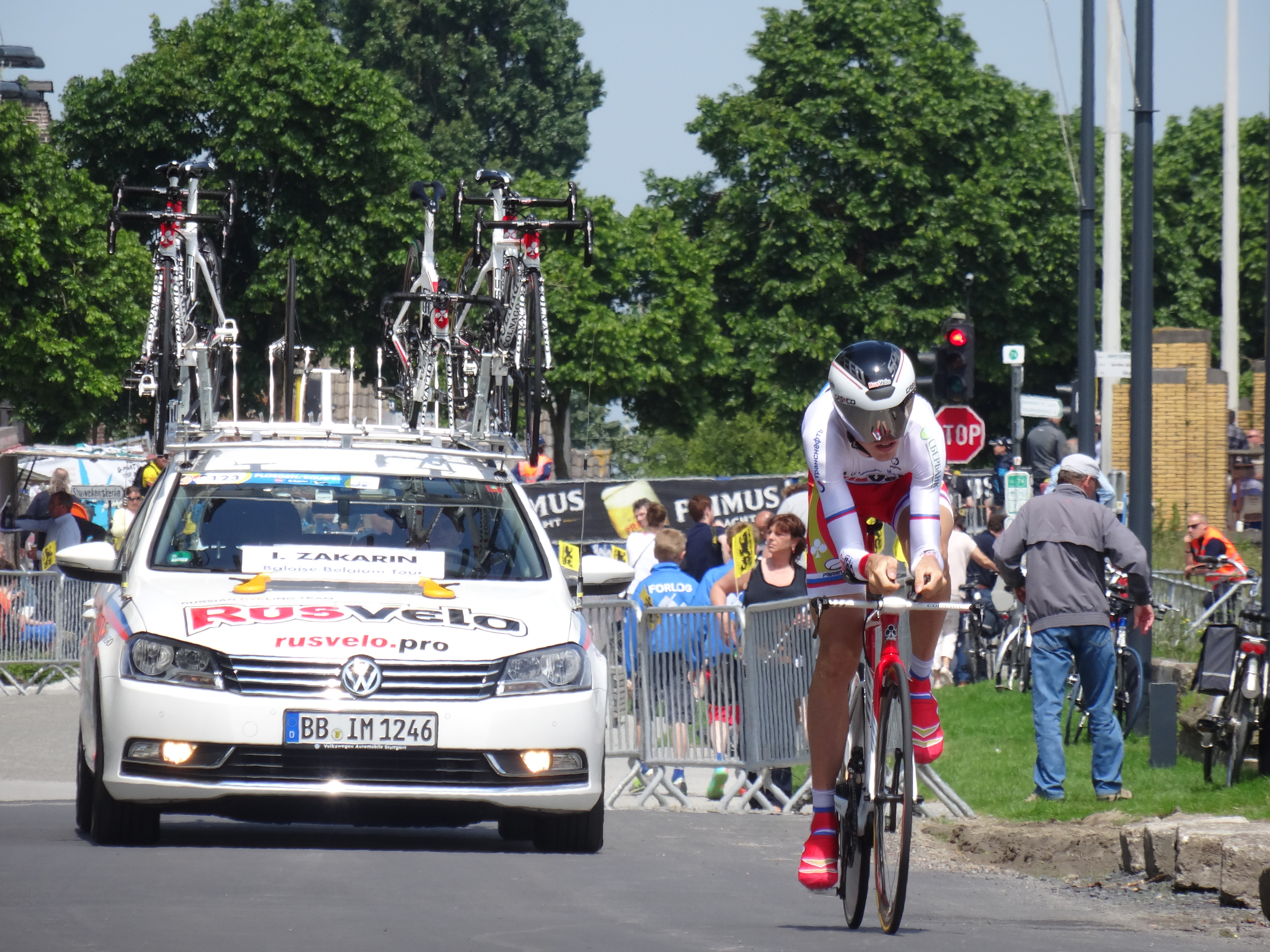
Ilnur Zakarin won the stage which finished at the Imola Circuit

After an almost entirely flat stage, the riders tackled the hills for a lumpy ride. The route contained three categorised climbs - the third category Passo Del Trebio, the third category Valico Del Prugno and the fourth category Tre Monti, which was passed four times during the stage. However, the route also contained several uncategorised climbs. After passing the Valico Del Prugno, the riders entered the Imola Circuit. The finishing circuit of the stage was 15.4 kilometres (9.6 miles) long and the riders tackled it three times. Each circuit contained the climb of Tre Monti but only the third passing of the climb was categorised.

No rider was able to break away until after the first intermediate sprint, 7.6 kilometres (4.7 miles) from the start. Giacomo Nizzolo won the intermediate sprint and shortly after the intermediate sprint, 10 riders slowly made their way into the break. General classification-wise, the best-placed man in the breakaway was Ryder Hesjedal, who was 6' 16" behind maglia rosa wearer Alberto Contador. The break was only allowed to build a gap of 3' 48" before the peloton started the chase. Along the way, Luca Paolini and Carlos Betancur fell off their bikes but they did not suffer serious injuries and Betancur made it back into the break. With 45 kilometres (28 miles) to go and as the riders entered the finishing circuit, the break's lead was down to 57 seconds but the break began to build their lead again. With around 30 kilometres (19 miles) to go, Stefan Küng put in a dig from the peloton and though he tried to bridge the gap to the break, he was caught by the peloton shortly afterwards.

Back up front, Ilnur Zakarin attacked with 22 kilometres (14 miles) to go as the break was closing in on the categorised climb of Tre Monti. He was able to continually increase his gap on the six remaining breakaway riders and he slowly built a gap of around 1 minute on his chasers. As the peloton continued to chase the break, Rigoberto Urán suffered a crash and though he was gapped by around 30 seconds, he was able to make it back to the peloton. Then, as the peloton closed in on the summit of the final ascent of Tre Monti, Contador surprised everyone with an attack. Fabio Aru tried to respond to his attack but Contador was able to build a short gap before being brought back shortly. On the final run-in, Maciej Paterski and Philippe Gilbert attacked out of the peloton but the duo were not able to catch the break. Meanwhile, Zakarin continued to have a steady advantage over his chasers as he eventually soloed across the finish line, 53 seconds ahead of his fellow breakaway riders. Paterski and Gilbert finished 58 seconds behind Zakarin while the peloton crossed the line 1' 02" behind. All of the main general classification riders finished safely within the peloton as Contador stayed in pink heading into the second half of the race.

Stage 11 result

	Rider	Team	Time
1	Ilnur Zakarin (RUS)	Team Katusha	3h 55' 08"
2	Carlos Betancur (COL)	AG2R La Mondiale	+ 53"
3	Franco Pellizotti (ITA)	Androni Giocattoli–Sidermec	+ 53"
4	Beñat Intxausti (ESP)	Movistar Team	+ 53"
5	Diego Rosa (ITA)	Astana	+ 53"
6	Steven Kruijswijk (NED)	LottoNL–Jumbo	+ 53"
7	Ryder Hesjedal (CAN)	Cannondale–Garmin	+ 53"
8	Maciej Paterski (POL)	CCC–Sprandi–Polkowice	+ 58"
9	Philippe Gilbert (BEL)	BMC Racing Team	+ 58"
10	Juan José Lobato (ESP)	Movistar Team	+ 1' 02"

General classification after Stage 11

	Rider	Team	Time
1	Alberto Contador (ESP)	Tinkoff–Saxo	46h 54' 19"
2	Fabio Aru (ITA)	Astana	+ 3"
3	Mikel Landa (ESP)	Astana	+ 46"
4	Dario Cataldo (ITA)	Astana	+ 1' 16"
5	Roman Kreuziger (CZE)	Tinkoff–Saxo	+ 1' 46"
6	Rigoberto Urán (COL)	Etixx–Quick-Step	+ 2' 10"
7	Giovanni Visconti (ITA)	Movistar Team	+ 2' 12"
8	Damiano Caruso (ITA)	BMC Racing Team	+ 2' 20"
9	Andrey Amador (CRC)	Movistar Team	+ 2' 24"
10	Leopold König (CZE)	Team Sky	+ 2' 30"
