= Alessandro Malaguti =

Italian cyclist

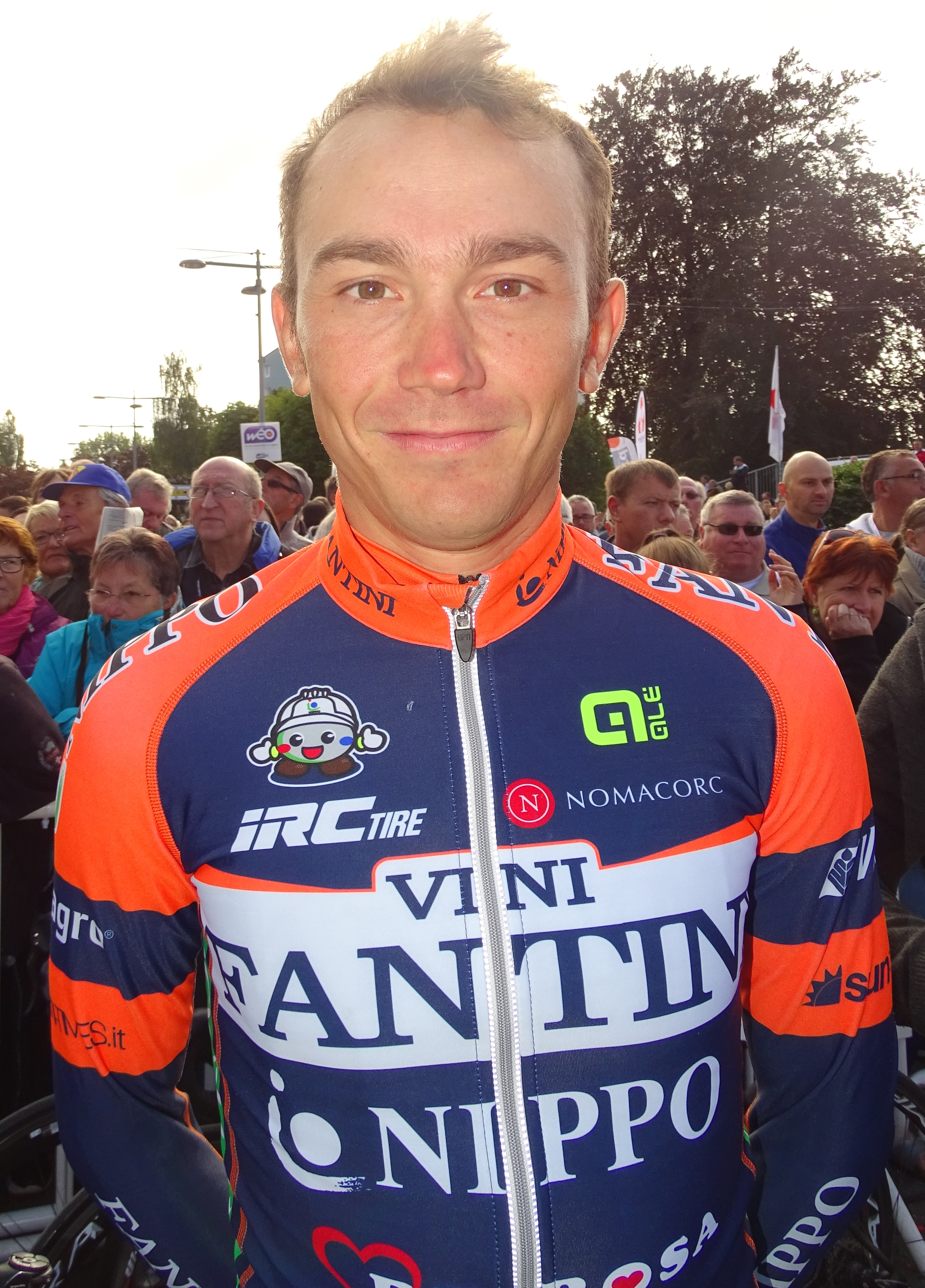
- Malaguti at the 2015 Grand Prix de Fourmies.

Personal information
- Full name: Alessandro Malaguti
- Born: 22 September 1987 (age 39) Forlì, Italy
- Height: 1.74 m (5 ft 9 in)
- Weight: 67 kg (148 lb; 10.6 st)

Cycling career
- Sport: Cycling
- Current team: Retired
- Discipline: Road
- Role: Rider

Amateur team
- 2008–2010: Calzaturieri Montegranaro

Professional teams
- 2011: Ora Hotels–Carrera
- 2012: Miche–Guerciotti
- 2013: Androni Giocattoli–Venezuela
- 2014–2015: Vini Fantini–Nippo
- 2016: Unieuro–Wilier

Alessandro Malaguti (born 22 September 1987) is an Italian former professional road bicycle racer, who rode professionally between 2011 and 2016 for the Ora Hotels–Carrera, Miche–Guerciotti, Androni Giocattoli–Venezuela, Nippo–Vini Fantini and Unieuro–Wilier teams.

== Career ==
Born in Forlì, Malaguti competed as a professional from 2011, when he joined the Ora Hotels–Carrera team. He spent one season with the team, winning a stage of the Vuelta del Uruguay, before he joined Miche–Guerciotti for the 2012 season. Again, he left the team after one season, and joined Androni Giocattoli–Venezuela for the 2013 season. Malaguti took the first European victory of his professional career in March 2013, when he won the 1.1-rated Route Adélie race, the fourth round of the French Road Cycling Cup. Malaguti was the fastest finisher out of a group of sixteen riders who battled for victory in a sprint finish, in Vitré.

For the 2014 season, Malaguti joined Vini Fantini–Nippo.

== Major results ==
2008
1st Coppa del Mobilio
2nd GP Folignano
2nd Gran Premio Città di Foligno
3rd Coppa Caduti
4th Coppa Comune di Castelfranco
5th Memorial Caucci Alberto
5th Trofeo e Gran Premio Banca di Credito Cooperativo del Metauro
6th Gran Premio della Liberazione
8th Trofeo Città di Castelfidardo
10th Giro del Cigno
2009
1st Gran Premio San Giuseppe
2nd Gran Premio Camon
3rd Giro del Cigno
5th Coppa Caduti di Reda
6th Gran Premio della Liberazione
10th Trofeo Cibes
2010
2nd Coppa Festa in Fiera San Salvatore
3rd Coppa Caivano
3rd Trofeo Memorial Secondo Marziali
4th Trofeo Maria SS Addolorata
6th Targa Crocifisso
6th Memorial Matteo Radicchi
7th G.P. Città di Montegranaro
9th GP Industria Commercio e Artigianato di San Giovanni Valdarno
10th Trofeo Città di Lastra a Signa
2011
4th Overall Vuelta del Uruguay

1st Stage 5

2013
1st Route Adélie
8th Gran Premio Bruno Beghelli
9th Circuito de Getxo
9th Tour de Vendée
2014
2nd Overall Tour de Hokkaido

1st Mountains classification
1st Stage 1

2016
3rd Overall Tour du Maroc
5th Tour of Almaty
10th Tour de Berne
