= 2017 Tour de Langkawi =

2017 UCI Asia Tour

Race details
- Dates: 22 February – 1 March 2017
- Stages: 8
- Distance: 1,222.2 km (759.4 mi)
- Winning time: 29h 04' 57"

Results
Jersey awarded to the overall winner	Winner	Ryan Gibbons (RSA)	(Team Dimension Data)
	Second	Cameron Bayly (AUS)	(IsoWhey Sports SwissWellness)
	Third	Alberto Cecchin (ITA)	(Wilier Triestina–Selle Italia)
Jersey awarded to the points classification winner	Points	Ryan Gibbons (RSA)	(Team Dimension Data)
Jersey awarded to the mountains classification winner	Mountains	John Ebsen (DEN)	(Infinite AIS Cycling Team)
Jersey awarded to the team classification winner	Team	IsoWhey Sports SwissWellness	

The 2017 Tour de Langkawi was the 22nd edition of an annual professional road bicycle racing stage race held in Malaysia since 1996. The race was run at the highest category apart from those races which make up the UCI World Tour, and was rated by the Union Cycliste Internationale (UCI) as a 2.HC (hors category) race as part of the 2017 UCI Asia Tour.

The race was won by South African rider Ryan Gibbons for Team Dimension Data, taking the first professional wins of his career. He won the race by 33 seconds ahead of Australia's Cameron Bayly (IsoWhey Sports SwissWellness), while the podium was completed by Italian rider Alberto Cecchin, a further two seconds behind for the Wilier Triestina–Selle Italia squad.

== Teams ==
19 teams accepted invitations to participate in the 2017 Tour de Langkawi. One UCI WorldTeam – Team Dimension Data was invited to the race, along with six UCI Professional Continental and eleven UCI Continental teams. The field was completed by one national selection teams. Each team had a maximum of six riders:

UCI WorldTeams

- Team Dimension Data

UCI Professional Continental teams

- Bardiani–CSF
- Wilier Triestina–Selle Italia
- Team Manzana Postobón
- UnitedHealthcare
- Nippo–Vini Fantini
- Androni–Sidermec–Bottecchia

UCI Continental teams

- IsoWhey Sports SwissWellness
- Aisan Racing Team
- 7 Eleven Roadbike Philippines
- Keyi Look Cycling Team
- Vino–Astana Motors
- KSPO Bianchi Asia
- Thailand Continental Cycling Team
- Team Sapura Cycling
- Terengganu Cycling Team
- Giant Cycling Team
- Infinite AIS Cycling Team

National team

- Malaysia

== Route ==
The itinerary for the race was released on 22 December 2016. It comprised eight stages, and a total distance of 1,222.2 kilometres (759.4 miles).

Stage schedule
Stage	Date	Route	Distance	Type	Winner
1	22 February	Kuala Berang to Kuala Terengganu	124.8 km (78 mi)	Flat stage	Scott Sunderland (AUS)
2	23 February	Jerteh to Gerik	208.1 km (129 mi)	Hilly stage	Travis McCabe (USA)
3	24 February	Serdang to Pantai Remis	118 km (73 mi)	Flat stage	Jakub Mareczko (ITA)
4	25 February	Seri Manjung to Cameron Highlands	174.4 km (108 mi)	Mountain stage	Mekseb Debesay (ERI)
5	26 February	Meru Raya to Kuala Kubu Bharu	151.5 km (94 mi)	Flat stage	Ryan Gibbons (RSA)
6	27 February	Senawang to Muar	176.3 km (110 mi)	Flat stage	Enrico Barbin (ITA)
7	28 February	Malacca to Rembau	148.1 km (92 mi)	Hilly stage	Jakub Mareczko (ITA)
8	1 March	Setiawangsa to Putrajaya	121 km (75 mi)	Flat stage	Travis McCabe (USA)

== Stages ==
=== Stage 1 ===
22 February 2017 — Kuala Berang to Kuala Terengganu, 124.8 km (78 mi)

Result of Stage 1
Rank	Rider	Team	Time
1	Scott Sunderland (AUS)	IsoWhey Sports SwissWellness	2h 54' 45"
2	Ryan Gibbons (RSA)	Team Dimension Data	+ 0"
3	Nicolas Marini (ITA)	Nippo–Vini Fantini	+ 0"
4	Jakub Mareczko (ITA)	Wilier Triestina–Selle Italia	+ 0"
5	Travis McCabe (USA)	UnitedHealthcare	+ 0"
6	Marco Benfatto (ITA)	Androni Giocattoli–Sidermec	+ 0"
7	Shiki Kuroeda (JPN)	Aisan Racing Team	+ 0"
8	Yevgeniy Gidich (KAZ)	Vino–Astana Motors	+ 0"
9	Phuchong Sai-udomsin (THA)	Thailand Continental Cycling Team	+ 4"
10	Enrico Barbin (ITA)	Bardiani–CSF	+ 4"

General classification after Stage 1
Rank	Rider	Team	Time
1	Scott Sunderland (AUS)	IsoWhey Sports SwissWellness	2h 54' 35"
2	Ryan Gibbons (RSA)	Team Dimension Data	+ 4"
3	Nicolas Marini (ITA)	Nippo–Vini Fantini	+ 6"
4	Jakub Mareczko (ITA)	Wilier Triestina–Selle Italia	+ 10"
5	Travis McCabe (USA)	UnitedHealthcare	+ 10"
6	Marco Benfatto (ITA)	Androni Giocattoli–Sidermec	+ 10"
7	Shiki Kuroeda (JPN)	Aisan Racing Team	+ 10"
8	Yevgeniy Gidich (KAZ)	Vino–Astana Motors	+ 10"
9	Phuchong Sai-udomsin (THA)	Thailand Continental Cycling Team	+ 14"
10	Enrico Barbin (ITA)	Bardiani–CSF	+ 14"

=== Stage 2 ===
23 February 2017 — Jerteh to Gerik, 208.1 km (129 mi)

Result of Stage 2
Rank	Rider	Team	Time
1	Travis McCabe (USA)	UnitedHealthcare	5h 04' 41"
2	Filippo Pozzato (ITA)	Wilier Triestina–Selle Italia	+ 0"
3	Ryan Gibbons (RSA)	Team Dimension Data	+ 0"
4	Alberto Cecchin (ITA)	Wilier Triestina–Selle Italia	+ 0"
5	Yevgeniy Gidich (KAZ)	Vino–Astana Motors	+ 0"
6	Marco Maronese (ITA)	Bardiani–CSF	+ 0"
7	Riccardo Stacchiotti (ITA)	Nippo–Vini Fantini	+ 0"
8	Rafael Andriato (BRA)	Wilier Triestina–Selle Italia	+ 0"
9	Cameron Bayly (AUS)	IsoWhey Sports SwissWellness	+ 0"
10	Mohd Shahrul Mat Amin (MAS)	Terengganu Cycling Team	+ 0"

General classification after Stage 2
Rank	Rider	Team	Time
1	Ryan Gibbons (RSA)	Team Dimension Data	7h 59' 13"
2	Travis McCabe (USA)	UnitedHealthcare	+ 3"
3	Filippo Pozzato (ITA)	Wilier Triestina–Selle Italia	+ 11"
4	Alberto Cecchin (ITA)	Wilier Triestina–Selle Italia	+ 11"
5	Yevgeniy Gidich (KAZ)	Vino–Astana Motors	+ 13"
6	Enrico Barbin (ITA)	Bardiani–CSF	+ 16"
7	Rafael Andriato (BRA)	Wilier Triestina–Selle Italia	+ 17"
8	Riccardo Stacchiotti (ITA)	Nippo–Vini Fantini	+ 17"
9	Chris Harper (AUS)	IsoWhey Sports SwissWellness	+ 17"
10	Hideto Nakane (JPN)	Nippo–Vini Fantini	+ 17"

=== Stage 3 ===
24 February 2017 — Serdang to Pantai Remis, 118 km (73 mi)

Result of Stage 3
Rank	Rider	Team	Time
1	Jakub Mareczko (ITA)	Wilier Triestina–Selle Italia	2h 48' 56"
2	Scott Sunderland (AUS)	IsoWhey Sports SwissWellness	+ 0"
3	Mohd Zamri Salleh (MAS)	Terengganu Cycling Team	+ 0"
4	Nicolas Marini (ITA)	Nippo–Vini Fantini	+ 0"
5	Marco Benfatto (ITA)	Androni Giocattoli–Sidermec	+ 0"
6	Travis McCabe (USA)	UnitedHealthcare	+ 0"
7	Enrico Barbin (ITA)	Bardiani–CSF	+ 0"
8	Yevgeniy Gidich (KAZ)	Vino–Astana Motors	+ 0"
9	Thanawut Sanikwathi (THA)	Thailand Continental Cycling Team	+ 0"
10	Mohd Izzat Hilmi Abdul Halil (MAS)	Team Sapura Cycling	+ 0"

General classification after Stage 3
Rank	Rider	Team	Time
1	Ryan Gibbons (RSA)	Team Dimension Data	10h 48' 09"
2	Travis McCabe (USA)	UnitedHealthcare	+ 3"
3	Filippo Pozzato (ITA)	Wilier Triestina–Selle Italia	+ 11"
4	Alberto Cecchin (ITA)	Wilier Triestina–Selle Italia	+ 11"
5	Yevgeniy Gidich (KAZ)	Vino–Astana Motors	+ 13"
6	Enrico Barbin (ITA)	Bardiani–CSF	+ 16"
7	Chris Harper (AUS)	IsoWhey Sports SwissWellness	+ 17"
8	Rafael Andriato (BRA)	Wilier Triestina–Selle Italia	+ 17"
9	Sergey Vlassenko (KAZ)	Vino–Astana Motors	+ 17"
10	Hideto Nakane (JPN)	Nippo–Vini Fantini	+ 17"

=== Stage 4 ===
25 February 2017 — Seri Manjung to Cameron Highlands, 174.4 km (108 mi)

Result of Stage 4
Rank	Rider	Team	Time
1	Mekseb Debesay (ERI)	Team Dimension Data	4h 37' 49"
2	Cameron Bayly (AUS)	IsoWhey Sports SwissWellness	+ 0"
3	Ryan Gibbons (RSA)	Team Dimension Data	+ 4"
4	Yevgeniy Gidich (KAZ)	Vino–Astana Motors	+ 4"
5	Alberto Cecchin (ITA)	Wilier Triestina–Selle Italia	+ 4"
6	Ben O'Connor (AUS)	Team Dimension Data	+ 4"
7	Chris Harper (AUS)	IsoWhey Sports SwissWellness	+ 4"
8	Egan Bernal (COL)	Androni Giocattoli–Sidermec	+ 4"
9	Daniel Jaramillo (COL)	UnitedHealthcare	+ 4"
10	Tim Roe (AUS)	IsoWhey Sports SwissWellness	+ 4"

General classification after Stage 4
Rank	Rider	Team	Time
1	Ryan Gibbons (RSA)	Team Dimension Data	15h 25' 58"
2	Cameron Bayly (AUS)	IsoWhey Sports SwissWellness	+ 11"
3	Alberto Cecchin (ITA)	Wilier Triestina–Selle Italia	+ 15"
4	Yevgeniy Gidich (KAZ)	Vino–Astana Motors	+ 17"
5	Chris Harper (AUS)	IsoWhey Sports SwissWellness	+ 21"
6	Mekseb Debesay (ERI)	Team Dimension Data	+ 21"
7	Daniel Jaramillo (COL)	UnitedHealthcare	+ 21"
8	Egan Bernal (COL)	Androni Giocattoli–Sidermec	+ 21"
9	Tim Roe (AUS)	IsoWhey Sports SwissWellness	+ 21"
10	Ben O'Connor (AUS)	Team Dimension Data	+ 21"

=== Stage 5 ===
26 February 2017 — Meru Raya to Kuala Kubu Bharu, 151.5 km (94 mi)

Result of Stage 5
Rank	Rider	Team	Time
1	Ryan Gibbons (RSA)	Team Dimension Data	3h 27' 20"
2	Jakub Mareczko (ITA)	Wilier Triestina–Selle Italia	+ 0"
3	Travis McCabe (USA)	UnitedHealthcare	+ 0"
4	Riccardo Stacchiotti (ITA)	Nippo–Vini Fantini	+ 0"
5	Anthony Giacoppo (AUS)	IsoWhey Sports SwissWellness	+ 0"
6	Mohd Zamri Salleh (MAS)	Terengganu Cycling Team	+ 0"
7	Marco Maronese (ITA)	Bardiani–CSF	+ 0"
8	Shiki Kuroeda (JPN)	Aisan Racing Team	+ 0"
9	Mohd Izzat Hilmi Abdul Halil (MAS)	Team Sapura Cycling	+ 0"
10	Enrico Barbin (ITA)	Bardiani–CSF	+ 0"

General classification after Stage 5
Rank	Rider	Team	Time
1	Ryan Gibbons (RSA)	Team Dimension Data	18h 53' 06"
2	Cameron Bayly (AUS)	IsoWhey Sports SwissWellness	+ 23"
3	Alberto Cecchin (ITA)	Wilier Triestina–Selle Italia	+ 27"
4	Yevgeniy Gidich (KAZ)	Vino–Astana Motors	+ 29"
5	Mekseb Debesay (ERI)	Team Dimension Data	+ 32"
6	Chris Harper (AUS)	IsoWhey Sports SwissWellness	+ 33"
7	Daniel Jaramillo (COL)	UnitedHealthcare	+ 33"
8	Egan Bernal (COL)	Androni Giocattoli–Sidermec	+ 33"
9	Tim Roe (AUS)	IsoWhey Sports SwissWellness	+ 33"
10	Ben O'Connor (AUS)	Team Dimension Data	+ 33"

=== Stage 6 ===
27 February 2017 — Senawang to Muar, 176.3 km (110 mi)

Result of Stage 6
Rank	Rider	Team	Time
1	Enrico Barbin (ITA)	Bardiani–CSF	4h 09' 16"
2	Anthony Giacoppo (AUS)	IsoWhey Sports SwissWellness	+ 0"
3	Filippo Pozzato (ITA)	Wilier Triestina–Selle Italia	+ 0"
4	Andrea Palini (ITA)	Androni Giocattoli–Sidermec	+ 0"
5	Marco Maronese (ITA)	Bardiani–CSF	+ 0"
6	Marco Benfatto (ITA)	Androni Giocattoli–Sidermec	+ 0"
7	Riccardo Stacchiotti (ITA)	Nippo–Vini Fantini	+ 0"
8	Paolo Simion (ITA)	Bardiani–CSF	+ 0"
9	Daniel Jaramillo (COL)	UnitedHealthcare	+ 0"
10	Mohd Zamri Salleh (MAS)	Terengganu Cycling Team	+ 0"

General classification after Stage 6
Rank	Rider	Team	Time
1	Ryan Gibbons (RSA)	Team Dimension Data	23h 02' 22"
2	Cameron Bayly (AUS)	IsoWhey Sports SwissWellness	+ 23"
3	Alberto Cecchin (ITA)	Wilier Triestina–Selle Italia	+ 27"
4	Mekseb Debesay (ERI)	Team Dimension Data	+ 32"
5	Chris Harper (AUS)	IsoWhey Sports SwissWellness	+ 33"
6	Daniel Jaramillo (COL)	UnitedHealthcare	+ 33"
7	Egan Bernal (COL)	Androni Giocattoli–Sidermec	+ 33"
8	Tim Roe (AUS)	IsoWhey Sports SwissWellness	+ 33"
9	Ben O'Connor (AUS)	Team Dimension Data	+ 33"
10	Fernando Orjuela (COL)	Team Manzana Postobón	+ 40"

=== Stage 7 ===
28 February 2017 — Malacca to Rembau, 148.1 km (92 mi)

Result of Stage 7
Rank	Rider	Team	Time
1	Jakub Mareczko (ITA)	Wilier Triestina–Selle Italia	3h 23' 45"
2	Travis McCabe (USA)	UnitedHealthcare	+ 0"
3	Andrea Palini (ITA)	Androni Giocattoli–Sidermec	+ 0"
4	Seo Joon-yong (KOR)	KSPO Bianchi Asia	+ 0"
5	Ryan Gibbons (RSA)	Team Dimension Data	+ 0"
6	Mekseb Debesay (ERI)	Team Dimension Data	+ 0"
7	Enrico Barbin (ITA)	Bardiani–CSF	+ 0"
8	Paolo Simion (ITA)	Bardiani–CSF	+ 0"
9	Riccardo Stacchiotti (ITA)	Nippo–Vini Fantini	+ 0"
10	Alberto Cecchin (ITA)	Wilier Triestina–Selle Italia	+ 0"

General classification after Stage 7
Rank	Rider	Team	Time
1	Ryan Gibbons (RSA)	Team Dimension Data	26h 26' 06"
2	Cameron Bayly (AUS)	IsoWhey Sports SwissWellness	+ 24"
3	Alberto Cecchin (ITA)	Wilier Triestina–Selle Italia	+ 28"
4	Mekseb Debesay (ERI)	Team Dimension Data	+ 33"
5	Chris Harper (AUS)	IsoWhey Sports SwissWellness	+ 34"
6	Daniel Jaramillo (COL)	UnitedHealthcare	+ 34"
7	Egan Bernal (COL)	Androni Giocattoli–Sidermec	+ 34"
8	Ben O'Connor (AUS)	Team Dimension Data	+ 34"
9	Tim Roe (AUS)	IsoWhey Sports SwissWellness	+ 34"
10	Fernando Orjuela (COL)	Team Manzana Postobón	+ 41"

=== Stage 8 ===
1 March 2017 — Setiawangsa to Putrajaya, 121 km (75 mi)

Result of Stage 8
Rank	Rider	Team	Time
1	Travis McCabe (USA)	UnitedHealthcare	2h 39' 00"
2	Anthony Giacoppo (AUS)	IsoWhey Sports SwissWellness	+ 0"
3	Riccardo Stacchiotti (ITA)	Nippo–Vini Fantini	+ 0"
4	Ryan Gibbons (RSA)	Team Dimension Data	+ 0"
5	Mohd Shahrul Mat Amin (MAS)	Terengganu Cycling Team	+ 0"
6	Andrea Palini (ITA)	Androni Giocattoli–Sidermec	+ 0"
7	Marco Maronese (ITA)	Bardiani–CSF	+ 0"
8	Enrico Barbin (ITA)	Bardiani–CSF	+ 0"
9	Filippo Pozzato (ITA)	Wilier Triestina–Selle Italia	+ 0"
10	Mekseb Debesay (ERI)	Team Dimension Data	+ 0"

Final general classification
Rank	Rider	Team	Time
1	Ryan Gibbons (RSA)	Team Dimension Data	29h 04' 57"
2	Cameron Bayly (AUS)	IsoWhey Sports SwissWellness	+ 33"
3	Alberto Cecchin (ITA)	Wilier Triestina–Selle Italia	+ 35"
4	Daniel Jaramillo (COL)	UnitedHealthcare	+ 37"
5	Mekseb Debesay (ERI)	Team Dimension Data	+ 41"
6	Chris Harper (AUS)	IsoWhey Sports SwissWellness	+ 43"
7	Egan Bernal (COL)	Androni Giocattoli–Sidermec	+ 43"
8	Ben O'Connor (AUS)	Team Dimension Data	+ 43"
9	Tim Roe (AUS)	IsoWhey Sports SwissWellness	+ 43"
10	Fernando Orjuela (COL)	Team Manzana Postobón	+ 50"

== Classification leadership table ==
In the 2017 Tour de Langkawi, four different jerseys were awarded. For the general classification, calculated by adding each cyclist's finishing times on each stage, and allowing time bonuses for the first three finishers at intermediate sprints and at the finish of mass-start stages, the leader received a yellow jersey. This classification was considered the most important of the 2017 Tour de Langkawi, and the winner of the classification was considered the winner of the race.

Additionally, there was a points classification, which awarded a blue jersey. In the points classification, cyclists received points for finishing in the top 10 in a mass-start stage. For winning a stage, a rider earned 15 points, with 12 for second, 9 for third, 7 for fourth with a point fewer per place down to a single point for 10th place. Points towards the classification could also be accrued at intermediate sprint points during each stage; these intermediate sprints also offered bonus seconds towards the general classification. There was also a mountains classification, the leadership of which was marked by a green and red jersey. In the mountains classification, points were won by reaching the top of a climb before other cyclists, with more points available for the higher-categorised climbs.

The fourth jersey represented the Asian rider classification, marked by a white jersey. This was decided in the same way as the general classification, but only riders from Asia were eligible to be ranked in the classification. There was also a classification for teams, in which the times of the best three cyclists in a team on each stage were added together; the leading team at the end of the race was the team with the lowest cumulative time, while there was also an Asian-only variant for the teams as well.

Stage	Winner	General classification	Points classification	Mountains classification	Asian rider classification	Team classification	Asian team classification
1	Scott Sunderland	Scott Sunderland	Scott Sunderland	Nur Amirul Fakhruddin Marzuki	Shiki Kuroeda	IsoWhey Sports SwissWellness	Vino–Astana Motors
2	Travis McCabe	Ryan Gibbons	Ryan Gibbons	John Ebsen	Yevgeniy Gidich	Wilier Triestina–Selle Italia	Vino–Astana Motors
3	Jakub Mareczko	Ryan Gibbons	Scott Sunderland	John Ebsen	Yevgeniy Gidich	IsoWhey Sports SwissWellness	Vino–Astana Motors
4	Mekseb Debesay	Ryan Gibbons	Scott Sunderland	John Ebsen	Yevgeniy Gidich	IsoWhey Sports SwissWellness	Vino–Astana Motors
5	Ryan Gibbons	Ryan Gibbons	Ryan Gibbons	John Ebsen	Yevgeniy Gidich	IsoWhey Sports SwissWellness	Vino–Astana Motors
6	Enrico Barbin	Ryan Gibbons	Ryan Gibbons	John Ebsen	Hideto Nakane	IsoWhey Sports SwissWellness	Vino–Astana Motors
7	Jakub Mareczko	Ryan Gibbons	Jakub Mareczko	John Ebsen	Hideto Nakane	IsoWhey Sports SwissWellness	Vino–Astana Motors
8	Travis McCabe	Ryan Gibbons	Ryan Gibbons	John Ebsen	Hideto Nakane	IsoWhey Sports SwissWellness	Vino–Astana Motors
Final		Ryan Gibbons	Ryan Gibbons	John Ebsen	Hideto Nakane	IsoWhey Sports SwissWellness	Vino–Astana Motors

== Final standings ==
=== General classification ===
Final general classification
Rank	Rider	Team	Time
1	Ryan Gibbons (RSA)	Team Dimension Data	29h 04' 57"
2	Cameron Bayly (AUS)	IsoWhey Sports SwissWellness	+ 33"
3	Alberto Cecchin (ITA)	Wilier Triestina–Selle Italia	+ 35"
4	Daniel Jaramillo (COL)	UnitedHealthcare	+ 37"
5	Mekseb Debesay (ERI)	Team Dimension Data	+ 41"
6	Chris Harper (AUS)	IsoWhey Sports SwissWellness	+ 43"
7	Egan Bernal (COL)	Androni Giocattoli–Sidermec	+ 43"
8	Ben O'Connor (AUS)	Team Dimension Data	+ 43"
9	Tim Roe (AUS)	IsoWhey Sports SwissWellness	+ 43"
10	Fernando Orjuela (COL)	Team Manzana Postobón	+ 50"

=== Points classification ===
Final points classification
Rank	Rider	Team	Points
1	Ryan Gibbons (RSA)	Team Dimension Data	75
2	Travis McCabe (USA)	UnitedHealthcare	62
3	Jakub Mareczko (ITA)	Wilier Triestina–Selle Italia	54
4	Enrico Barbin (ITA)	Bardiani–CSF	33
5	Anthony Giacoppo (AUS)	IsoWhey Sports SwissWellness	32
6	Scott Sunderland (AUS)	IsoWhey Sports SwissWellness	30
7	Seo Joon-yong (KOR)	KSPO Bianchi Asia	28
8	Riccardo Stacchiotti (ITA)	Nippo–Vini Fantini	26
9	Filippo Pozzato (ITA)	Wilier Triestina–Selle Italia	23
10	Alberto Cecchin (ITA)	Wilier Triestina–Selle Italia	22

=== Mountains classification ===
Final mountains classification
Rank	Rider	Team	Points
1	John Ebsen (DEN)	Infinite AIS Cycling Team	36
2	Wilmar Pérez (COL)	Team Sapura Cycling	30
3	Mekseb Debesay (ERI)	Team Dimension Data	26
4	Marcelo Felipe (PHI)	7 Eleven Roadbike Philippines	21
5	Sergio Higuita (COL)	Team Manzana Postobón	21
6	Cameron Bayly (AUS)	IsoWhey Sports SwissWellness	20
7	Nur Amirul Fakhruddin Marzuki (MAS)	Terengganu Cycling Team	16
8	Ryan Gibbons (RSA)	Team Dimension Data	16
9	Loh Sea Keong (MAS)	Thailand Continental Cycling Team	15
10	Daniel Jaramillo (COL)	UnitedHealthcare	14

=== Asian rider classification ===
Final Asian rider classification
Rank	Rider	Team	Time
1	Hideto Nakane (JPN)	Nippo–Vini Fantini	29h 06' 13"
2	Dmitry Lukyanov (KAZ)	Vino–Astana Motors	+ 51"
3	Marcelo Felipe (PHI)	7 Eleven Roadbike Philippines	+ 1' 22"
4	Dadi Suryadi (INA)	Terengganu Cycling Team	+ 3' 21"
5	Masakazu Ito (JPN)	Nippo–Vini Fantini	+ 4' 53"
6	Mohd Shahrul Mat Amin (MAS)	Terengganu Cycling Team	+ 6' 46"
7	Tomohiro Hayakawa (JPN)	Aisan Racing Team	+ 14' 39"
8	Ronald Yeung (HKG)	Infinite AIS Cycling Team	+ 15' 27"
9	Sergey Vlassenko (KAZ)	Vino–Astana Motors	+ 18' 11"
10	Deng Penghai (CHN)	Giant Cycling Team	+ 20' 11"

=== Team classification ===
Final teams classification
Rank	Team	Time
1	IsoWhey Sports SwissWellness	87h 16' 52"
2	Team Dimension Data	+ 0"
3	Team Manzana Postobón	+ 25"
4	Androni Giocattoli–Sidermec	+ 1' 39"
5	UnitedHealthcare	+ 15' 29"
6	Nippo–Vini Fantini	+ 15' 49"
7	Wilier Triestina–Selle Italia	+ 17' 56"
8	Bardiani–CSF	+ 22' 38"
9	Vino–Astana Motors	+ 30' 28"
10	Team Sapura Cycling	+ 43' 13"

=== Asian team classification ===
Final Asian teams classification
Rank	Team	Time
1	Vino–Astana Motors	87h 47' 20"
2	Terengganu Cycling Team	+ 20' 44"
3	Malaysia (national team)	+ 37' 55"
4	Giant Cycling Team	+ 38' 17"
5	7 Eleven Roadbike Philippines	+ 59' 37"
6	Thailand Continental Cycling Team	+ 1h 00' 05"
7	Infinite AIS Cycling Team	+ 1h 04' 26"
8	KSPO Bianchi Asia	+ 1h 14' 18"
9	Keyi Look Cycling Team	+ 1h 18' 45"
10	Aisan Racing Team	+ 1h 25' 08"

=== Riders who failed to finish ===
17 riders failed to finish the race.
Rider	Team
Simone Velasco (ITA)	Bardiani–CSF
Luca Pacioni (ITA)	Androni Giocattoli–Sidermec
Nicolas Marini (ITA)	Nippo–Vini Fantini
Harrif Salleh (MAS)	Terengganu Cycling Team
Yevgeniy Gidich (KAZ)	Vino–Astana Motors
Tanaphon Seanumnuyphon (THA)	Infinite AIS Cycling Team
Hiroaki Harada (JPN)	Aisan Racing Team
Shotaro Watanabe (JPN)	Aisan Racing Team
Park Sung-baek (KOR)	KSPO Bianchi Asia
Kang Seok-ho (KOR)	KSPO Bianchi Asia
Cho Hae-sung (KOR)	KSPO Bianchi Asia
Huang En (CHN)	Keyi Look Cycling Team
Shi Yanhui (CHN)	Keyi Look Cycling Team
Thanawut Sanikwathi (THA)	Thailand Continental Cycling Team
Sarawut Sirironnachai (THA)	Thailand Continental Cycling Team
Josh Berry (AUS)	7 Eleven Roadbike Philippines
Li Xiangyuan (CHN)	Giant Cycling Team
