= UFF =

UFF or Uff may refer to:

== Paramilitaries ==
- Uganda Freedom Fighters, a faction in the Bush War
- Ulster Freedom Fighters, a loyalist faction in Northern Ireland
- United Freedom Front, an American left-wing group

== Science and technology ==
- Universal File Format, in computer-aided test software
- Universal force field, in chemical modelling

== Sport ==
- Uzbekistan Football Federation
- Team UFF, a Brazilian cycling team

== Other uses ==
- Uff!, a Venezuelan boy band
- Universidade Federal Fluminense, a university in Brazil
- UltraFast Fibre, a New Zealand Ultra-Fast Broadband firm
- Ulandshjælp fra Folk til Folk, a Danish humanitarian project

== See also ==
- Uffie (born 1987), American musician
