= 2016 Tour de Romandie =

2016 UCI World Tour, race 14 of 28

Race details
- Dates: 26 April–1 May 2016
- Stages: 6
- Distance: 643.56 km (399.89 mi)
- Winning time: 16h 20' 20"

Results
| Jersey awarded to the overall winner | Winner | Nairo Quintana (COL) | (Movistar Team) |
| | Second | Thibaut Pinot (FRA) | (FDJ) |
| | Third | Ion Izagirre (ESP) | (Movistar Team) |
| Jersey awarded to the points classification winner | Points | Michael Albasini (SUI) | (Orica–GreenEDGE) |
| Jersey awarded to the mountains classification winner | Mountains | Sander Armée (BEL) | (Lotto–Soudal) |
| Jersey awarded to the youth classification winner | Youth | Pierre Latour (FRA) | (AG2R La Mondiale) |
| | Team | Movistar Team | |

The 2016 Tour de Romandie was a road cycling stage race that took place in the Romandy region of Switzerland between 26 April and 1 May. It was the 70th edition of the Tour de Romandie and the 14th event in the 2016 UCI World Tour. The defending champion was Team Katusha's Ilnur Zakarin.

The race included six stages. The first of these was a prologue individual time trial; the five subsequent stages included two summit finishes and a hilly time trial.

== Route ==
Stage schedule
| Stage | Date | Route | Distance | Type | Winner |
|---|---|---|---|---|---|
| P | 26 April | La Chaux-de-Fonds | 3.95 km (2.5 mi) | Individual time trial | Ion Izagirre (ESP) |
| 1 | 27 April | Mathod to Moudon | 100.5 km (62.4 mi) | Flat stage | Marcel Kittel (GER) |
| 2 | 28 April | Moudon to Morgins | 173.9 km (108.1 mi) | Mountain stage | Nairo Quintana (COL) |
| 3 | 29 April | Sion to Sion | 15.11 km (9.4 mi) | Individual time trial | Thibaut Pinot (FRA) |
| 4 | 30 April | Conthey to Villars-sur-Ollon | 172.7 km (107.3 mi) | Mountain stage | Chris Froome (GBR) |
| 5 | 1 May | Ollon to Geneva | 177.4 km (110.2 mi) | Flat stage | Michael Albasini (SUI) |

== Participating teams ==
As the Tour de Romandie is a UCI World Tour event, all eighteen UCI WorldTeams were invited automatically and obliged to enter a team into the race. The race organisers also invited UCI Professional Continental teams Team Roth and Wanty–Groupe Gobert.

UCI WorldTeams

- AG2R La Mondiale
- Astana
- BMC Racing Team
- Cannondale
- Etixx–Quick-Step
- FDJ
- IAM Cycling
- Lampre–Merida
- Lotto–Soudal
- LottoNL–Jumbo
- Movistar Team
- Orica–GreenEDGE
- Team Dimension Data
- Team Giant–Alpecin
- Team Katusha
- Team Sky
- Tinkoff
- Trek–Segafredo

UCI Professional Continental teams

- Team Roth
- Wanty–Groupe Gobert

== Stages ==
=== Prologue ===
26 April 2016 — La Chaux-de-Fonds, 3.95 kilometres (2.45 mi), individual time trial (ITT)

Prologue result
| Rank | Rider | Team | Time |
|---|---|---|---|
| 1 | Ion Izagirre (ESP) | Movistar Team | 5' 33" |
| 2 | Tom Dumoulin (NED) | Team Giant–Alpecin | + 6" |
| 3 | Michał Kwiatkowski (POL) | Team Sky | + 7" |
| 4 | Geraint Thomas (GBR) | Team Sky | + 7" |
| 5 | Gorka Izagirre (ESP) | Movistar Team | + 8" |
| 6 | Moreno Moser (ITA) | Cannondale | + 9" |
| 7 | Reto Hollenstein (SUI) | IAM Cycling | + 11" |
| 8 | Louis Vervaeke (BEL) | Lotto–Soudal | + 11" |
| 9 | Tejay van Garderen (USA) | BMC Racing Team | + 11" |
| 10 | Martijn Keizer (NED) | LottoNL–Jumbo | + 12" |

General classification after prologue
| Rank | Rider | Team | Time |
|---|---|---|---|
| 1 | Ion Izagirre (ESP) | Movistar Team | 5' 33" |
| 2 | Tom Dumoulin (NED) | Team Giant–Alpecin | + 6" |
| 3 | Michał Kwiatkowski (POL) | Team Sky | + 7" |
| 4 | Geraint Thomas (GBR) | Team Sky | + 7" |
| 5 | Gorka Izagirre (ESP) | Movistar Team | + 8" |
| 6 | Moreno Moser (ITA) | Cannondale | + 9" |
| 7 | Reto Hollenstein (SUI) | IAM Cycling | + 11" |
| 8 | Louis Vervaeke (BEL) | Lotto–Soudal | + 11" |
| 9 | Tejay van Garderen (USA) | BMC Racing Team | + 11" |
| 10 | Martijn Keizer (NED) | LottoNL–Jumbo | + 12" |

=== Stage 1 ===
27 April 2016 — Mathod to Moudon, 100.5 kilometres (62.4 mi)

Stage 1 result
| Rank | Rider | Team | Time |
|---|---|---|---|
| 1 | Marcel Kittel (GER) | Etixx–Quick-Step | 2h 27' 46" |
| 2 | Niccolò Bonifazio (ITA) | Trek–Segafredo | + 0" |
| 3 | Michael Albasini (SUI) | Orica–GreenEDGE | + 0" |
| 4 | Tosh van der Sande (BEL) | Lotto–Soudal | + 0" |
| 5 | Ramūnas Navardauskas (LTU) | Cannondale | + 0" |
| 6 | Davide Cimolai (ITA) | Lampre–Merida | + 0" |
| 7 | Samuel Dumoulin (FRA) | AG2R La Mondiale | + 0" |
| 8 | Enrico Gasparotto (ITA) | Wanty–Groupe Gobert | + 0" |
| 9 | Kristian Sbaragli (ITA) | Team Dimension Data | + 0" |
| 10 | Ilnur Zakarin | Team Katusha | + 0" |

General classification after stage 1
| Rank | Rider | Team | Time |
|---|---|---|---|
| 1 | Ion Izagirre (ESP) | Movistar Team | 2h 33' 19" |
| 2 | Tom Dumoulin (NED) | Team Giant–Alpecin | + 6" |
| 3 | Geraint Thomas (GBR) | Team Sky | + 7" |
| 4 | Gorka Izagirre (ESP) | Movistar Team | + 8" |
| 5 | Moreno Moser (ITA) | Cannondale | + 9" |
| 6 | Reto Hollenstein (SUI) | IAM Cycling | + 11" |
| 7 | Louis Vervaeke (BEL) | Lotto–Soudal | + 11" |
| 8 | Tejay van Garderen (USA) | BMC Racing Team | + 11" |
| 9 | Martijn Keizer (NED) | LottoNL–Jumbo | + 12" |
| 10 | Thibaut Pinot (FRA) | FDJ | + 16" |

=== Stage 2 ===
28 April 2016 — Moudon to Morgins, 173.9 kilometres (108.1 mi)

Nairo Quintana claimed victory on Stage 2 due to Ilnur Zakarin being relegated to second for changing his line in the sprint to the finish.

Stage 2 result
| Rank | Rider | Team | Time |
|---|---|---|---|
| 1 | Nairo Quintana (COL) | Movistar Team | 4h 28' 40" |
| 2 | Ilnur Zakarin | Team Katusha | + 0" |
| 3 | Rui Costa (POR) | Lampre–Merida | + 26" |
| 4 | Rigoberto Urán (COL) | Cannondale | + 26" |
| 5 | Thibaut Pinot (FRA) | FDJ | + 26" |
| 6 | Ion Izagirre (ESP) | Movistar Team | + 26" |
| 7 | Rafał Majka (POL) | Tinkoff | + 26" |
| 8 | Mathias Frank (SUI) | IAM Cycling | + 26" |
| 9 | Pierre Rolland (FRA) | Cannondale | + 26" |
| 10 | Simon Špilak (SLO) | Team Katusha | + 26" |

General classification after stage 2
| Rank | Rider | Team | Time |
|---|---|---|---|
| 1 | Nairo Quintana (COL) | Movistar Team | 7h 02' 05" |
| 2 | Ilnur Zakarin | Team Katusha | + 18" |
| 3 | Ion Izagirre (ESP) | Movistar Team | + 20" |
| 4 | Thibaut Pinot (FRA) | FDJ | + 32" |
| 5 | Rui Costa (POR) | Lampre–Merida | + 36" |
| 6 | Mathias Frank (SUI) | IAM Cycling | + 37" |
| 7 | Simon Špilak (SLO) | Team Katusha | + 42" |
| 8 | Pierre Rolland (FRA) | Cannondale | + 43" |
| 9 | Bauke Mollema (NED) | Trek–Segafredo | + 44" |
| 10 | Rigoberto Urán (COL) | Cannondale | + 46" |

=== Stage 3 ===
29 April 2016 — Sion, 15.11 kilometres (9.39 mi) individual time trial (ITT)

Stage 3 result
| Rank | Rider | Team | Time |
|---|---|---|---|
| 1 | Thibaut Pinot (FRA) | FDJ | 20' 21" |
| 2 | Tom Dumoulin (NED) | Team Giant–Alpecin | + 2" |
| 3 | Bob Jungels (LUX) | Etixx–Quick-Step | + 8" |
| 4 | Chris Froome (GBR) | Team Sky | + 9" |
| 5 | Jérôme Coppel (FRA) | IAM Cycling | + 9" |
| 6 | Nairo Quintana (COL) | Movistar Team | + 9" |
| 7 | Ilnur Zakarin (RUS) | Team Katusha | + 17" |
| 8 | Ion Izagirre (ESP) | Movistar Team | + 17" |
| 9 | Steve Morabito (SUI) | FDJ | + 22" |
| 10 | Manuele Boaro (ITA) | Tinkoff | + 24" |

General classification after stage 3
| Rank | Rider | Team | Time |
|---|---|---|---|
| 1 | Nairo Quintana (COL) | Movistar Team | 7h 22' 35" |
| 2 | Thibaut Pinot (FRA) | FDJ | + 23" |
| 3 | Ilnur Zakarin (RUS) | Team Katusha | + 26" |
| 4 | Ion Izagirre (ESP) | Movistar Team | + 29" |
| 5 | Tom Dumoulin (NED) | Team Giant–Alpecin | + 50" |
| 6 | Mathias Frank (SUI) | IAM Cycling | + 1' 06" |
| 7 | Simon Špilak (SLO) | Team Katusha | + 1' 11" |
| 8 | Rui Costa (POR) | Lampre–Merida | + 1' 12" |
| 9 | Tejay van Garderen (USA) | BMC Racing Team | + 1' 22" |
| 10 | Rafał Majka (POL) | Tinkoff | + 1' 23" |

=== Stage 4 ===
30 April 2016 — Conthey to Villars-sur-Ollon, 172.7 kilometres (107.3 mi)

Stage 4 result
| Rank | Rider | Team | Time |
|---|---|---|---|
| 1 | Chris Froome (GBR) | Team Sky | 4h 44' 24" |
| 2 | Ion Izagirre (ESP) | Movistar Team | + 4" |
| 3 | Thibaut Pinot (FRA) | FDJ | + 4" |
| 4 | Ilnur Zakarin (RUS) | Team Katusha | + 4" |
| 5 | Nairo Quintana (COL) | Movistar Team | + 4" |
| 6 | Bauke Mollema (NED) | Trek–Segafredo | + 4" |
| 7 | Rui Costa (POR) | Lampre–Merida | + 4" |
| 8 | Rigoberto Urán (COL) | Cannondale | + 4" |
| 9 | Tejay van Garderen (USA) | BMC Racing Team | + 9" |
| 10 | Simon Špilak (SLO) | Team Katusha | + 9" |

General classification after stage 4
| Rank | Rider | Team | Time |
|---|---|---|---|
| 1 | Nairo Quintana (COL) | Movistar Team | 12h 07' 03" |
| 2 | Thibaut Pinot (FRA) | FDJ | + 19" |
| 3 | Ion Izagirre (ESP) | Movistar Team | + 23" |
| 4 | Ilnur Zakarin (RUS) | Team Katusha | + 26" |
| 5 | Tom Dumoulin (NED) | Team Giant–Alpecin | + 57" |
| 6 | Rui Costa (POR) | Lampre–Merida | + 1' 12" |
| 7 | Simon Špilak (SLO) | Team Katusha | + 1' 16" |
| 8 | Mathias Frank (SUI) | IAM Cycling | + 1' 16" |
| 9 | Bauke Mollema (NED) | Trek–Segafredo | + 1' 24" |
| 10 | Tejay van Garderen (USA) | BMC Racing Team | + 1' 27" |

=== Stage 5 ===
1 May 2016 — Ollon to Geneva, 177.4 kilometres (110.2 mi)

Stage 5 result
| Rank | Rider | Team | Time |
|---|---|---|---|
| 1 | Michael Albasini (SUI) | Orica–GreenEDGE | 4h 13' 17" |
| 2 | Andrey Amador (CRC) | Movistar Team | + 0" |
| 3 | Wilco Kelderman (NED) | LottoNL–Jumbo | + 0" |
| 4 | Niccolò Bonifazio (ITA) | Trek–Segafredo | + 0" |
| 5 | Moreno Hofland (NED) | LottoNL–Jumbo | + 0" |
| 6 | Kristian Sbaragli (ITA) | Team Dimension Data | + 0" |
| 7 | Daryl Impey (RSA) | Orica–GreenEDGE | + 0" |
| 8 | Tom Bohli (SUI) | BMC Racing Team | + 0" |
| 9 | Carlos Verona (ESP) | Etixx–Quick-Step | + 0" |
| 10 | Jarlinson Pantano (COL) | IAM Cycling | + 0" |

General classification after stage 5
| Rank | Rider | Team | Time |
|---|---|---|---|
| 1 | Nairo Quintana (COL) | Movistar Team | 16h 20' 20" |
| 2 | Thibaut Pinot (FRA) | FDJ | + 19" |
| 3 | Ion Izagirre (ESP) | Movistar Team | + 23" |
| 4 | Ilnur Zakarin (RUS) | Team Katusha | + 26" |
| 5 | Tom Dumoulin (NED) | Team Giant–Alpecin | + 57" |
| 6 | Rui Costa (POR) | Lampre–Merida | + 1' 12" |
| 7 | Simon Špilak (SLO) | Team Katusha | + 1' 16" |
| 8 | Mathias Frank (SUI) | IAM Cycling | + 1' 16" |
| 9 | Bauke Mollema (NED) | Trek–Segafredo | + 1' 24" |
| 10 | Tejay van Garderen (USA) | BMC Racing Team | + 1' 27" |

== Classification leadership table ==
In the Tour de Romandie, four jerseys are awarded. The general classification was calculated by adding up each cyclist's finishing times on each stage. Time bonuses were awarded to the first three finishers on road stages (stages 2–5): the stage winner won a ten-second bonus, with six and four seconds for the second and third riders respectively. No bonus seconds were awarded at intermediate sprints. The leader of the general classification received a yellow jersey. This classification was considered the most important of the Tour, and the winner of the classification was considered the winner of the race. The young rider classification was based on the general classification: the highest-ranked rider born after 1 January 1990 was the leader of the classification and wore a white jersey.

There was a mountains classification; the leader of this competition wore a pink jersey. Over the road stages of the race, there were 15 classified climbs, each of which was ranked as first-category, second-category or third-category. The first riders to cross the summit of the climbs won points towards the mountain classification. On first-category climbs, the first five riders won points with the first of these winning 12 points. Points were also awarded to the first five riders across the summit of second-category climbs, though the winner only won 8 points. On third-category climbs, only the first four riders won points, with the first rider winning five points. There was also a points classification. On each of the road stages, there were two intermediate sprints. The first rider in these sprints won 6 points; the second rider won 3 points; the third rider won 1 point. No points were awarded at stage finishes. The winner of the classification won a green jersey.

The final individual classification was a combativity prize. After each road stage, a jury chose the rider on the basis of sportsmanship and effort in the stage. The rider was awarded a red dossard (race number) for the following stage. After the final stage, the jury chose the most combative rider of the race overall.

The final classification was a team classification. This was calculated by adding together the times of the best three riders on each team in each stage except the team time trial. In this stage, the team's finishing time was that of the fifth rider across the line.

| Stage | Winner | General classification | Points classification | Mountains classification | Young rider classification | Combativity prize | Team classification |
|---|---|---|---|---|---|---|---|
| P | Ion Izagirre | Ion Izagirre | Ion Izagirre | Louis Vervaeke | Louis Vervaeke | not awarded | Movistar Team |
| 1 | Marcel Kittel | Ion Izagirre | Marcel Kittel | Sander Armée | Louis Vervaeke | Sander Armée | Movistar Team |
| 2 | Nairo Quintana | Nairo Quintana | Marcel Kittel | Nairo Quintana | Davide Formolo | Daryl Impey | Cannondale |
| 3 | Thibaut Pinot | Nairo Quintana | Ion Izagirre | Nairo Quintana | Damien Howson | not awarded | Movistar Team |
| 4 | Chris Froome | Nairo Quintana | Ion Izagirre | Nairo Quintana | Pierre Latour | Bob Jungels | Movistar Team |
| 5 | Michael Albasini | Nairo Quintana | Michael Albasini | Sander Armée | Pierre Latour | Chris Froome | Movistar Team |
| Final | | Nairo Quintana | Michael Albasini | Sander Armée | Pierre Latour | not awarded | Movistar Team |

== Classification standings ==
=== General classification ===
Final general classification (1–10)
| Rank | Rider | Team | Time |
|---|---|---|---|
| 1 | Nairo Quintana (COL) | Movistar Team | 16h 20' 20" |
| 2 | Thibaut Pinot (FRA) | FDJ | + 19" |
| 3 | Ion Izagirre (ESP) | Movistar Team | + 23" |
| 4 | Ilnur Zakarin | Team Katusha | + 26" |
| 5 | Tom Dumoulin (NED) | Team Giant–Alpecin | + 57" |
| 6 | Rui Costa (POR) | Lampre–Merida | + 1' 12" |
| 7 | Simon Špilak (SLO) | Team Katusha | + 1' 16" |
| 8 | Mathias Frank (SUI) | IAM Cycling | + 1' 16" |
| 9 | Bauke Mollema (NED) | Trek–Segafredo | + 1' 24" |
| 10 | Tejay van Garderen (USA) | BMC Racing Team | + 1' 27" |

=== Points classification ===
Final points classification (1–10)
| Rank | Rider | Team | Points |
|---|---|---|---|
| 1 | Michael Albasini (SWI) | Orica–GreenEDGE | 91 |
| 2 | Ion Izagirre (SPA) | Movistar Team | 81 |
| 3 | Thibaut Pinot (FRA) | FDJ | 75 |
| 4 | Ilnur Zakarin | Team Katusha | 67 |
| 5 | Nairo Quintana (COL) | Movistar Team | 62 |
| 6 | Tom Dumoulin (NED) | Team Giant–Alpecin | 56 |
| 7 | Chris Froome (GBR) | Team Sky | 55 |
| 8 | Niccolò Bonifazio (ITA) | Trek–Segafredo | 48 |
| 9 | Daryl Impey (SAF) | Orica–GreenEDGE | 47 |
| 10 | Andrey Amador (CRI) | Movistar Team | 44 |

=== Mountains classification ===
Final mountains classification (1–10)
| Rank | Rider | Team | Points |
|---|---|---|---|
| 1 | Sander Armée (BEL) | Lotto–Soudal | 42 |
| 2 | Nairo Quintana (COL) | Movistar Team | 34 |
| 3 | Chris Froome (GBR) | Team Sky | 28 |
| 4 | Pavel Kochetkov | Team Katusha | 24 |
| 5 | Tejay van Garderen (USA) | BMC Racing Team | 22 |
| 6 | Ilnur Zakarin | Team Katusha | 16 |
| 7 | Rui Costa (POR) | Lampre–Merida | 16 |
| 8 | Daryl Impey (SAF) | Orica–GreenEDGE | 14 |
| 9 | Marcel Wyss (SWI) | IAM Cycling | 12 |
| 10 | Thibaut Pinot (FRA) | FDJ | 12 |

=== Young rider classification ===
Final young rider classification (1–10)
| Rank | Rider | Team | Time |
|---|---|---|---|
| 1 | Pierre Latour (FRA) | AG2R La Mondiale | 16h 22' 44" |
| 2 | Damien Howson (AUS) | Orica–GreenEDGE | + 1' 57" |
| 3 | Merhawi Kudus (ERI) | Team Dimension Data | + 2' 49" |
| 4 | Carlos Verona (SPA) | Etixx–Quick-Step | + 3' 01" |
| 5 | Jan Polanc (SLO) | Lampre–Merida | + 6' 42" |
| 6 | Jack Haig (AUS) | Orica–GreenEDGE | + 18' 57" |
| 7 | Guillaume Martin (FRA) | Wanty–Groupe Gobert | + 21' 52" |
| 8 | Matej Mohorič (SLO) | Lampre–Merida | + 34' 51" |
| 9 | Alexey Vermeulen (USA) | LottoNL–Jumbo | + 35' 07" |
| 10 | Valentin Baillifard (SWI) | Team Roth | + 43' 08" |

=== Team classification ===
Final team classification (1–10)
| Rank | Team | Time |
|---|---|---|
| 1 | (Spain) Movistar Team | 49h 06' 36" |
| 2 | Team Katusha | + 1' 24" |
| 3 | (United States) Cannondale | + 10' 49" |
| 4 | (France) FDJ | + 13' 26" |
| 5 | (United States) BMC Racing Team | + 13' 51" |
| 6 | (France) AG2R La Mondiale | + 22' 24" |
| 7 | (Italy) Lampre–Merida | + 22' 32" |
| 8 | (South Africa) Team Dimension Data | + 27' 05" |
| 9 | (Belgium) Lotto–Soudal | + 36' 08" |
| 10 | (Belgium) Etixx–Quick-Step | + 38' 51" |
