= List of 2017 UCI Professional Continental and Continental teams =

The Union Cycliste Internationale (UCI), the governing body of cycling, categorises teams into three divisions. The top 18 teams are the UCI WorldTeams and compete in the UCI World Tour. The second and third divisions respectively are the Professional Continental teams and the Continental teams.

The teams compete in the UCI Continental Circuits, which are divided into five continental zones: Africa, America, Asia, Europe and Oceania. They also win points in the UCI World Ranking. Professional Continental teams are also invited to participate in events in the UCI World Tour, although they are not eligible to win points in the World Tour rankings.

== List of 2017 UCI Professional Continental teams ==
According to the UCI Rulebook,

"a professional continental team is an organisation created to take part in road events open to professional continental teams. It is known by a unique name and registered with the UCI in accordance with the provisions below.

- The professional continental team comprises all the riders registered with the UCI as members of the team, the paying agent, the sponsors and all other persons contracted by the paying agent and/or the sponsors to provide for the continuing operation of the team (manager, team manager, coach, paramedical assistant, mechanic, etc.).
- Each professional continental team must employ at least 14 riders, 2 team managers and 3 other staff (paramedical assistants, mechanics, etc.) on a full time basis for the whole registration year."

Code	Official Team Name	Country	Continent
MZN	Team Manzana Postobón	Colombia	America
SOU	Soul Brasil Pro Cycling	Brazil	America
TNN	Team Novo Nordisk	United States	America
UHC	UnitedHealthcare	United States	America
ANS	Androni–Sidermec–Bottecchia	Italy	Europe
ABS	Aqua Blue Sport	Ireland	Europe
BRD	Bardiani–CSF	Italy	Europe
CJR	Caja Rural–Seguros RGA	Spain	Europe
CCC	CCC–Sprandi–Polkowice	Poland	Europe
COF	Cofidis	France	Europe
DMP	Delko–Marseille Provence KTM	France	Europe
DEN	Direct Énergie	France	Europe
TFO	Fortuneo–Oscaro	France	Europe
GAZ	Gazprom–RusVelo	Russia	Europe
ICA	Israel Cycling Academy	Israel	Europe
NIP	Nippo–Vini Fantini	Italy	Europe
RNL	Roompot–Nederlandse Loterij	Netherlands	Europe
SVB	Sport Vlaanderen–Baloise	Belgium	Europe
VWC	Vérandas Willems–Crelan	Belgium	Europe
WGG	Wanty–Groupe Gobert	Belgium	Europe
WVA	WB Veranclassic Aqua Protect	Belgium	Europe
WIL	Wilier Triestina–Selle Italia	Italy	Europe

== UCI Continental teams ==
According to the UCI Rulebook, "a UCI continental team is a team of road riders recognised and licensed to take part in events on the continental calendars by the national federation of the nationality of the majority of its riders and registered with the UCI. The precise structure (legal and financial status, registration, guarantees, standard contract, etc.) of these teams shall be determined by the regulations of the national federation."

=== 2017 UCI Africa Tour teams ===
Code	Official Team Name	Country
DDC	Dimension Data for Qhubeka	South Africa
VCS	Vélo Club Sovac	Algeria

=== 2017 UCI America Tour teams ===
Code	Official Team Name	Country
ACM	Asociación Civil Mardan	Argentina
AFT	A.C. Agrupación Virgen de Fátima	Argentina
EMP	Equipo Continental Municipalidad de Pocito	Argentina
CID	Italomat–Dogo	Argentina
CEA	Los Cascos Esco–AgroPlan	Argentina
MRT	Municipalidad de Rawson–Somos Todos	Argentina
SEP	Sindicato de Empleados Publicos de San Juan	Argentina
EBL	Equipo Bolivia	Bolivia
STF	Start–Vaxes Cycling Team	Bolivia
UFF	Team UFF	Brazil
GQC	Garneau–Québecor	Canada
HRB	H&R Block Pro Cycling	Canada
SPC	Silber Pro Cycling Team	Canada
BSM	Bicicletas Strongman	Colombia
EPM	EPM	Colombia
ECZ	Coldeportes–Zenú	Colombia
GWS	GW–Shimano	Colombia
MED	Medellín–Inder	Colombia
DCT	Inteja Dominican Cycling Team	Dominican Republic
MTE	Team Ecuador	Ecuador
CAS	Canel's–Specialized	Mexico
VIV	Vivo Team Grupo Oresy	Paraguay
AVE	Aevolo	United States
AHB	Axeon–Hagens Berman	United States
CYN	Hangar 15 Bicycles	United States
CCB	CCB Velotooler	United States
CPC	Cylance Pro Cycling	United States
ELV	Elevate–KHS Pro Cycling	United States
HCR	Holowesko Citadel Racing Team	United States
JBC	Jelly Belly–Maxxis	United States
RLY	Rally Cycling	United States
ILU	Team Illuminate	United States

=== 2017 UCI Asia Tour teams ===
Code	Official Team Name	Country
VIB	VIB Bikes	Bahrain
XDS	Beijing XDS–Innova Cycling Team	China
EGCB	China Continental Team of Gansu Bank	China
MSS	Giant Cycling Team	China
JLC	Hainan Jilun Cycling Team	China
HEN	Hengxiang Cycling Team	China
HBT	Holy Brother	China
KYL	Keyi Look Cycling Team	China
MTS	Mitchelton Scott	China
NLC	Ningxia Sports Lottery–Livall Cycling Team	China
TYD	Qinghai Tianyoude Cycling Team	China
LSL	Yunnan Lvshan Landscape–Taishan Pardus	China
GPC	Gapyeong Cycling Team	South Korea
GIC	Geumsan Insam Cello	South Korea
KCT	Korail Cycling Team	South Korea
KSP	KSPO Bianchi Asia	South Korea
LXC	LX Cycling Team	South Korea
SCT	Seoul Cycling Team	South Korea
SKD	Skydive Dubai–Al Ahli	United Arab Emirates
HKS	HKSI Pro Cycling Team	Hong Kong
PCT	Pegasus Continental Cycling Team	Indonesia
KFC	KFC Cycling Team	Indonesia
PKY	Pishgaman Cycling Team	Iran
SPT	Sepahan Cycling Team	Iran
TST	Tabriz Shahrdary Team	Iran
AIS	Aisan Racing Team	Japan
BGT	Bridgestone–Anchor	Japan
IPC	Interpro Cycling Academy	Japan
KIN	Kinan Cycling Team	Japan
MTR	Matrix Powertag	Japan
NAS	Nasu Blasen	Japan
SMN	Shimano Racing Team	Japan
UKO	Team Ukyo	Japan
BLZ	Utsunomiya Blitzen	Japan
TSE	Astana City	Kazakhstan
VAN	Vino–Astana Motors	Kazakhstan
CSM	Memil Pro Cycling	Kuwait
KWC	Kuwait–Cartucho.es	Kuwait
KCP	Massi–Kuwait Cycling Project	Kuwait
NCT	Nice Cycling Team	Kuwait
CCN	CCN	Laos
TSC	Team Sapura Cycling	Malaysia
TSG	Terengganu Cycling Team	Malaysia
7RP	7 Eleven Roadbike Philippines	Philippines
IAC	Infinite AIS Cycling Team	Thailand
RTS	RTS–Monton Racing Team	Taiwan
ACT	Action Cycling Team	Taiwan
TCC	Thailand Continental Cycling Team	Thailand

=== 2017 UCI Europe Tour teams ===
Code	Official Team Name	Country
AMO	Amore & Vita–Selle SMP	Albania
AMP	Amplatz–BMC	Austria
RSW	Team Felbermayr–Simplon Wels	Austria
HAC	Hrinkow Advarics Cycleang	Austria
TIR	Tirol Cycling Team	Austria
VOL	Team Vorarlberg	Austria
WSA	WSA–Greenlife	Austria
BCP	Synergy Baku	Azerbaijan
MCC	Minsk Cycling Club	Belarus
AAS	AGO–Aqua Service	Belgium
BEC	Beobank–Corendon	Belgium
CIB	Cibel–Cebon	Belgium
ERC	ERA–Circus	Belgium
MNG	Marlux–Napoleon Games	Belgium
PSV	Pauwels Sauzen–Vastgoedservice	Belgium
PCW	T.Palm–Pôle Continental Wallon	Belgium
TIS	Tarteletto–Isorex	Belgium
TFL	Telenet–Fidea Lions	Belgium
UNI	Unieuro Trevigiani–Hemus 1896	Bulgaria
MKT	Meridiana–Kamen	Croatia
ASP	AC Sparta Praha	Czech Republic
PFG	CK Příbram Fany Gastro	Czech Republic
ELA	Elkov–Author	Czech Republic
SKC	SKC TUFO Prostějov	Czech Republic
ABB	BHS–Almeborg Bornholm	Denmark
TCQ	Team ColoQuick–Cult	Denmark
CPH	Christina Jewelry–Kuma	Denmark
TGC	Team Giant–Castelli	Denmark
RIW	Riwal Platform	Denmark
TVC	Team Virtu Cycling	Denmark
ADT	Armée de Terre	France
AUB	HP BTP–Auber93	France
RLM	Roubaix–Lille Métropole	France
CYC	0711 / Cycling	Germany
BAI	Bike Aid	Germany
TDA	Dauner D&DQ–Akkon	Germany
THF	Team Heizomat	Germany
LKT	LKT Team Brandenburg	Germany
LKH	Team Lotto–Kern Haus	Germany
RNR	Rad-Net Rose Team	Germany
SVL	Team Sauerland NRW p/b Henley & Partners	Germany
DSU	Development Team Sunweb	Germany
BIK	Bike Channel–Canyon	United Kingdom
JLT	JLT–Condor	United Kingdom
MGT	Madison Genesis	United Kingdom
ONE	ONE Pro Cycling	United Kingdom
RAL	Team Raleigh–GAC	United Kingdom
WGN	WIGGINS	United Kingdom
SKT	An Post–Chain Reaction	Ireland
AZT	D'Amico Utensilnord	Italy
GME	GM Europa Ovini	Italy
SAN	Sangemini–MG.K Vis	Italy
RBR	Rietumu Banka–Riga	Latvia
SIT	Staki–Technorama	Lithuania
CCD	Differdange–Losch	Luxembourg
LPC	Leopard Pro Cycling	Luxembourg
BBD	Baby-Dump Cyclingteam	Netherlands
DCT	Inteja Dominican Cycling Team	Netherlands
DJP	Destil–Jo Piels	Netherlands
MET	Metec–TKH	Netherlands
MCT	Monkey Town Continental Team	Netherlands
SEG	SEG Racing Academy	Netherlands
TCO	Team Coop	Norway
FIX	Team FixIT.no	Norway
TJI	Joker Icopal	Norway
TSS	Team Sparebanken Sør	Norway
UXT	Uno-X Hydrogen Development Team	Norway
DOM	Domin Sport	Poland
THU	Team Hurom	Poland
VOS	Voster Uniwheels Team	Poland
WIB	Wibatech 7R Fuji	Poland
EFP	Efapel	Portugal
LAA	LA Alumínios / Metalusa Blackjack	Portugal
LHL	Louletano–Hospital de Loulé	Portugal
BOA	Rádio Popular–Boavista	Portugal
STA	Sporting / Tavira	Portugal
W52	W52 / FC Porto / Mestre da Cor	Portugal
TCT	Tusnad Cycling Team	Romania
LOK	Lokosphinx	Russia
DVP	Dare Viator Partizan	Serbia
DKB	Dukla Banská Bystrica	Slovakia
ADR	Adria Mobil	Slovenia
ATG	Attaque Team Gusto	Slovenia
ROG	Rog–Ljubljana	Slovenia
TTB	Team Tre Berg–PostNord	Sweden
TRA	Roth–Akros	Switzerland
TRK	Torku Åžekerspor	Turkey
KLS	Kolss Cycling Team	Ukraine
ISD	ISD–Jorbi	Ukraine

=== 2017 UCI Oceania Tour teams ===
Code	Official Team Name	Country
DPV	Drapac–Pat's Veg	Australia
IWS	IsoWhey Sports SwissWellness	Australia
NIS	New South Wales Institute of Sport	Australia
STG	St George Continental Cycling Team	Australia

Preceded by 2016	List of UCI Professional Continental and Continental teams 2017	Succeeded by 2018
