= Pinizzotto =

Pinizzotto is an Italian surname. Notable people with the surname include:

- Leonardo Pinizzotto (born 1986), Italian cyclist
- Peter Pinizzotto, Italian–born Canadian soccer coach and manager
- Steve Pinizzotto (born 1984), Canadian–German ice hockey player
