= 2015 Scheldeprijs =

- Event poster with previous winner Marcel Kittel

Race details
- Dates: 8 April 2015
- Distance: 200 km (124.3 mi)
- Winning time: 4h 30' 10"

Results
	Winner	Alexander Kristoff (NOR)	(Team Katusha)
	Second	Edward Theuns (BEL)	(Topsport Vlaanderen–Baloise)
	Third	Yauheni Hutarovich (BLR)	(Bretagne–Séché Environnement)

The 2015 Scheldeprijs was the 103rd edition of the Scheldeprijs cycling classic. It took place on 8 April, starting in Antwerp and ending in Schoten. The race was rated as a 1.HC event and was part of the 2015 UCI Europe Tour.

The Scheldeprijs particularly suited the sprinters as it included several cobbled roads but no significant climbs. The winner in the previous three editions, Marcel Kittel (Team Giant–Alpecin) was forced to withdraw from the race due to illness; Mark Cavendish (Etixx–Quick-Step), who had also won the race on three occasions, chose not to participate, as did André Greipel (Lotto–Soudal). The race favourite was therefore Alexander Kristoff (Team Katusha), who had won the Tour of Flanders the previous weekend. Other riders considered to have a chance of victory included Peter Sagan (Tinkoff–Saxo), Elia Viviani (Team Sky) and Romain Feillu (Bretagne–Séché Environnement).

An early breakaway was brought back with 4 kilometres (2.5 miles) remaining, with the work done by Team Katusha, Etixx–Quick-Step and Team Sky. There was a large crash at the front of the peloton in the last two kilometres of the race. This took out many of the race favourites. Kristoff was without teammates in the final part of the race, but he was able to follow the FDJ train to win the sprint finish from the small group that had avoided the crash.

== Teams ==
25 teams were invited to the race, including 12 UCI WorldTeams and 13 Professional Continental teams.

WorldTeams

- AG2R La Mondiale
- Astana
- Etixx–Quick-Step
- FDJ
- Lotto–Soudal
- Cannondale–Garmin
- Team Giant–Alpecin
- Team Katusha
- LottoNL–Jumbo
- Team Sky
- Tinkoff–Saxo
- Trek Factory Racing

Professional Continental teams

- Bora–Argon 18
- Bretagne–Séché Environnement
- Cofidis
- Cult Energy Pro Cycling
- MTN–Qhubeka
- Nippo–Vini Fantini
- Southeast Pro Cycling
- Team Europcar
- Team Roompot
- Topsport Vlaanderen–Baloise
- UnitedHealthcare
- Wanty–Groupe Gobert
- Androni Giocattoli

== Results ==
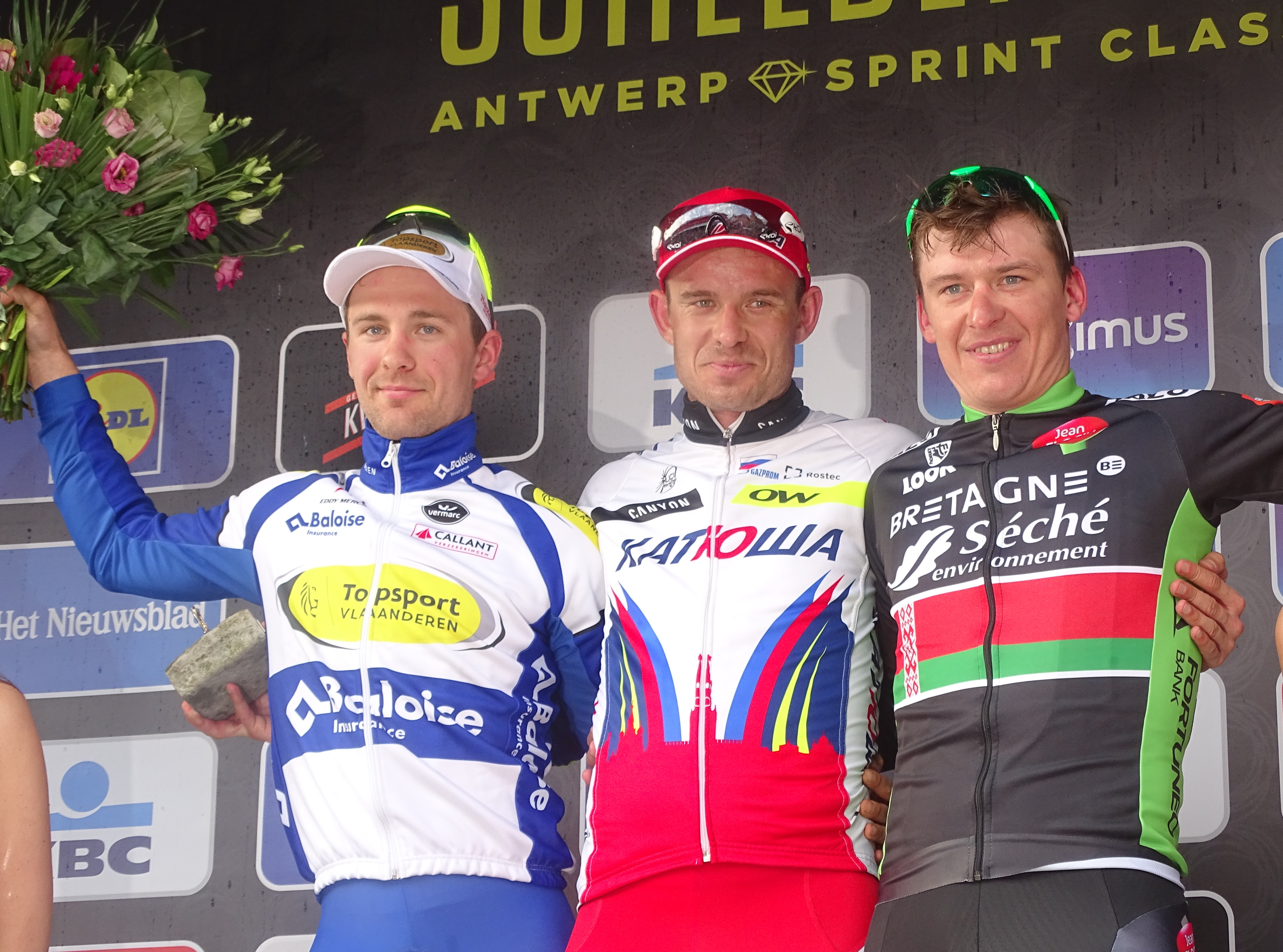
Edward Theuns, winner Alexander Kristoff and Yauheni Hutarovich

Race result
Rank	Rider	Team	Time
1	Alexander Kristoff (NOR)	Team Katusha	4h 30' 10"
2	Edward Theuns (BEL)	Topsport Vlaanderen–Baloise	+ 0"
3	Yauheni Hutarovich (BLR)	Bretagne–Séché Environnement	+ 0"
4	Marc Sarreau (FRA)	FDJ	+ 0"
5	Danny van Poppel (NED)	Trek Factory Racing	+ 0"
6	Matteo Trentin (ITA)	Etixx–Quick-Step	+ 0"
7	Nicolas Marini (ITA)	Nippo–Vini Fantini	+ 0"
8	Michael Van Staeyen (BEL)	Cofidis	+ 0"
9	Tyler Farrar (USA)	MTN–Qhubeka	+ 0"
10	Christoph Pfingsten (GER)	Bora–Argon 18	+ 0"
