= Fernando Orjuela =

Colombian cyclist

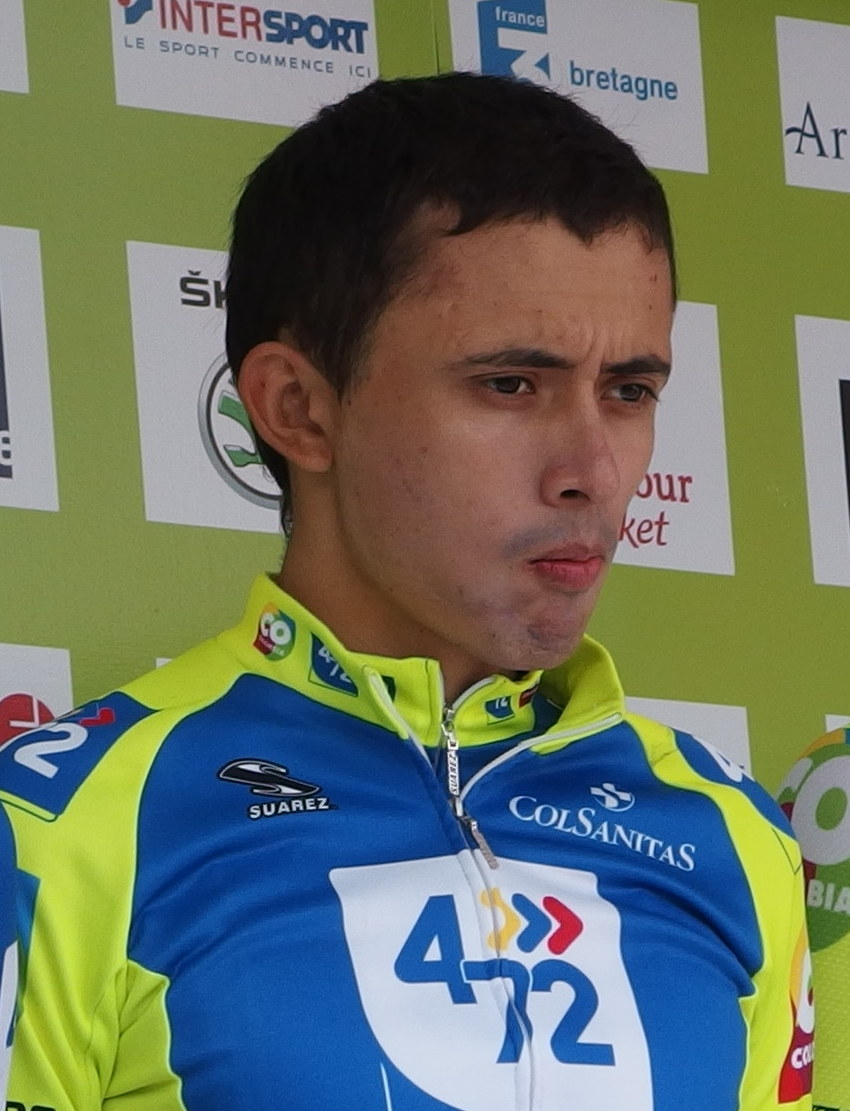
- Orjuela in 2014.

Personal information
- Full name: Fernando Orjuela Gutiérrez
- Born: November 4, 1991 (age 34) Restrepo, Meta
- Height: 1.68 m (5 ft 6 in)
- Weight: 60 kg (132 lb)

Cycling career
- Sport: Cycling
- Discipline: Road
- Role: Rider
- Rider type: All-rounder

Amateur teams
- 2012: Colombia es Pasión–Café de Colombia
- 2015: Team Manzana Postobón
- 2016: Sogamoso Ciudad Influyente–IRDS

Professional teams
- 2013–2014: 4-72 Colombia
- 2017–2018: Team Manzana Postobón

Fernando Orjuela Gutiérrez (born November 4, 1991, in Restrepo, Meta) is a Colombian cyclist, who last rode for UCI Professional Continental team Team Manzana Postobón. He was named in the startlist for the 2017 Vuelta a España.

== Major results ==
2013
2nd Overall Tour Alsace
2014
6th Overall Vuelta Ciclista a Costa Rica
2017
10th Overall Tour de Langkawi
2018
1st Mountains classification Vuelta a Asturias

=== Grand Tour general classification results timeline ===
| Grand Tour | 2017 |
|---|---|
| Giro d'Italia | — |
| Tour de France | — |
| Vuelta a España | 135 |

Legend
| — | Did not compete |
| DNF | Did not finish |
