= Jairo Alexander Beltrán Castañeda =

Colombian kidnapper, sex offender, murderer and suspected serial killer

- Born: Unknown; Meta Department, Colombia
- Other names: "El Monstruode Llano"; Jairo Manotas
- Conviction: Murder x1
- Penalty: Unknown

Details
- Victims: 1–4+
- Span of crimes: Unknown–2015
- Country: Colombia
- State: Meta
- Date apprehended: 2015

Jairo Alexander Beltrán Castañeda (year of birth unknown) is a Colombian kidnapper, sex offender, murderer and suspected serial killer. The authorities accuse him of having committed at least 4 murders, although it is believed that he could have killed more people in Meta, an area where he and his family members were known to commit their crimes.

Nicknamed El Monstruo de Llano and Jairo Manotas, he confessed to the murder of manicurist Sandra Milena Ramírez, which occurred in Meta in 2015. Apart from this, police authorities connected him to three other murders of people who were kidnapped, killed and subsequently buried in mass graves, the same way in which Sandra had been found.

In addition, Beltrán Castañeda was a serial rapist. One of his victims, Oneida Beltrán, was assaulted in Villavicencio, where the criminal would eventually be captured.

== Crimes ==
Beltrán Castañeda was convicted for the murder of 25-year-old Sandra Milena Ramírez, one of supposedly several murders he committed in Meta on April 11, 2015. The victim, who was last seen going for an alleged work appointment with her neighbors on the Santa Teresita hacienda, was kidnapped, raped, murdered and dismembered, her body later found in the town of Restrepo. Jairo admitted his guilt in this killing, indicating to police where he buried the victim; when Ramírez was unearthed, it was discovered that her hair was missing from the physical abuse she had suffered. According to investigators, Beltrán Castañeda also admitted to the crime to exonerate several of his relatives, who were thought to be connected to the case. Following Sandra's kidnapping, a ransom demand of $5,000,000 pesos was sent to her family, in exchange for her release.

Along with other members of his family, including his mother Carmen Perdomo Palencia and brother Edward, Beltrán Castañeda formed a gang that kidnapped people and later obtained financial rewards for letting them go. All of them were charged with being the authors of the murders and kidnappings for ransom of two women, one of them being Sandra Milena Ramírez.

According to the specialized members of the police force, Beltrán Castañeda committed three other murders in Meta. This theory was forwarded when the bodies of three people who were physically and sexually violated were found in mass graves, matching Jairo's modus operandi.

As a result of these events, both Beltrán Castañeda and other members of his family are imprisoned, each for various crimes.

== See also ==
- List of serial killers by country
