= 2017 Sibiu Cycling Tour =

2017 UCI Europe Tour

Race details
- Dates: 5–9 July 2017
- Stages: 5
- Distance: 734 km (456 mi)
- Winning time: 18h 19' 33"

Results
Jersey awarded to the overall winner	Winner	Egan Bernal (COL)	(Androni–Sidermec–Bottecchia)
	Second	Colin Stüssi (SUI)	(Roth–Akros)
	Third	Valentin Baillifard (SUI)	(Roth–Akros)
Jersey awarded to the points classification winner	Points	Egan Bernal (COL)	(Androni–Sidermec–Bottecchia)
Jersey awarded to the mountains classification winner	Mountains	Moritz Fußnegger (GER)	(0711 / Cycling)
Jersey awarded to the young rider classification winner	Young rider	Egan Bernal (COL)	(Androni–Sidermec–Bottecchia)
Jersey awarded to the sprints classification winner	Sprints	Damian Lüscher (SUI)	(Roth–Akros)
	Team	Roth–Akros	

The 2017 Sibiu Cycling Tour was a cycling stage race that took place between 5 and 9 July 2017 in and around Sibiu, Romania. Raced over 734 kilometres (456 miles), the race featured a traditional cobbled prologue along with mountain stages to Bâlea Lake and Păltiniș, and was held as part of the 2017 UCI Europe Tour.

The race was won by Colombian climber Egan Bernal, riding for the Androni–Sidermec–Bottecchia squad. Bernal took the race lead after winning the second stage of the race, the queen stage, to the summit finish at Bâlea Lake; he then further extended his lead by winning the following day to Păltiniș. Bernal ultimately won the race by 1 minute, 40 seconds ahead of Roth–Akros rider Colin Stüssi, with the podium being completed by another Roth–Akros rider, Valentin Baillifard, a further 35 seconds behind.

Bernal's performances were enough for him to win two other jerseys, winning the points and young rider classifications. In the race's other sub-classifications, Moritz Fußnegger from 0711 / Cycling was the winner of the mountains classification, Damian Lüscher (Roth–Akros) was the winner of the sprints classification, while Roth–Akros were the winners of the teams classification.

== Teams ==
Initially, 21 teams were invited to the race. The peloton featured three Professional Continental Teams, 17 Continental Teams and a Romanian national team, including for the first time, teams from North America.

However, Team ColoQuick–Cult and Kuwait–Cartucho.es did not compete, which left the starting peloton at 19 teams.

UCI Professional Continental teams

- CCC–Sprandi–Polkowice
- UnitedHealthcare
- Androni–Sidermec–Bottecchia

UCI Continental teams

- 0711 / Cycling
- Kolesarski Klub Novo Mesto
- Bike Aid
- Team ColoQuick
- D'Amico–UM Tools
- Team Differdange–Geba
- Dukla Banská Bystrica
- Team Giant–Castelli
- GM Europa Ovini
- Mazowsze Serce Polski
- Team Illuminate
- Azerion / Villa Valkenburg
- Akros–Excelsior–Thömus
- Tusnad Cycling Team
- U.C. Trevigiani Energiapura Marchiol
- Christina Jewelry–Kuma

National Teams

- Romania

== Route ==
The race route was announced in December 2016.

Stage schedule
Stage	Date	Course	Distance	Type	Winner
P	5 July	Sibiu to Sibiu	2.3 km (1 mi)	Individual time trial	Andrea Palini (ITA)
1	6 July	Sibiu to Sibiu	211.8 km (132 mi)	Medium-mountain stage	Edwin Ávila (COL)
2	7 July	Sibiu to Bâlea Lake	160 km (99 mi)	Mountain stage	Egan Bernal (COL)
3	8 July	Sibiu to Păltiniș	211.5 km (131 mi)	Mountain stage	Egan Bernal (COL)
4	9 July	Sibiu to Sibiu	148.4 km (92 mi)	Medium-mountain stage	Eduard-Michael Grosu (ROU)

== Stages ==
=== Prologue ===
5 July 2017 — Sibiu to Sibiu, 2.3 km (1 mi), individual time trial (ITT)

Prologue result & General classification after Prologue
Rank	Rider	Team	Time
1	Andrea Palini (ITA)	Androni–Sidermec–Bottecchia	3' 07"
2	Luca Pacioni (ITA)	Androni–Sidermec–Bottecchia	+ 2"
3	Carlos Alzate (COL)	UnitedHealthcare	+ 4"
4	Maciej Paterski (POL)	CCC–Sprandi–Polkowice	+ 5"
5	Fabio Tommassini (ITA)	D'Amico Utensilnord	+ 5"
6	Nicklas Overgaard Pedersen (DEN)	Team Giant–Castelli	+ 5"
7	Łukasz Owsian (POL)	CCC–Sprandi–Polkowice	+ 5"
8	Raffaello Bonusi (ITA)	Androni–Sidermec–Bottecchia	+ 6"
9	Joris Blokker (NED)	Monkey Town Continental Team	+ 6"
10	Krisztián Lovassy (HUN)	Differdange–Losch	+ 6"

=== Stage 1 ===
6 July 2017 — Sibiu to Sibiu, 211.8 km (132 mi)

The first stage covered 211.8 kilometres (131.6 miles) of rolling terrain including 7 categorised climbs. After 40 kilometres (25 miles) of the stage, two riders – Edwin Ávila (Team Illuminate) and Moritz Fußnegger (0711 / Cycling) – broke away from the peloton building up at one stage a 6 minute advantage. With over 30 kilometres (19 miles) of the race remaining Ávila attacked on his own and soloed to a stage win, holding off the chasing peloton who finished 43 seconds behind.

Stage 1 result
Rank	Rider	Team	Time
1	Edwin Ávila (COL)	Team Illuminate	5h 01' 57"
2	Eduard-Michael Grosu (ROM)	Romania (national team)	+ 43"
3	Simone Ponzi (ITA)	CCC–Sprandi–Polkowice	+ 43"
4	Fabio Tommassini (ITA)	D'Amico Utensilnord	+ 44"
5	Nicklas Overgaard Pedersen (DEN)	Team Giant–Castelli	+ 44"
6	Andrea Palini (ITA)	Androni–Sidermec–Bottecchia	+ 44"
7	Antonino Parrinello (ITA)	GM Europa Ovini	+ 44"
8	Meron Teshome (ERI)	Bike Aid	+ 44"
9	Germán Tivani (ARG)	Unieuro Trevigiani–Hemus 1896	+ 44"
10	Nicola Toffali (ITA)	0711 / Cycling	+ 44"

General classification after Stage 1
Rank	Rider	Team	Time
1	Edwin Ávila (COL)	Team Illuminate	5h 04' 55"
2	Andrea Palini (ITA)	Androni–Sidermec–Bottecchia	+ 52"
3	Eduard-Michael Grosu (ROM)	Romania (national team)	+ 54"
4	Luca Pacioni (ITA)	Androni–Sidermec–Bottecchia	+ 54"
5	Simone Ponzi (ITA)	CCC–Sprandi–Polkowice	+ 56"
6	Carlos Alzate (COL)	UnitedHealthcare	+ 56"
7	Fabio Tommassini (ITA)	D'Amico Utensilnord	+ 57"
8	Nicklas Overgaard Pedersen (DEN)	Team Giant–Castelli	+ 57"
9	Maciej Paterski (POL)	CCC–Sprandi–Polkowice	+ 57"
10	Łukasz Owsian (POL)	CCC–Sprandi–Polkowice	+ 57"

=== Stage 2 ===
7 July 2017 — Sibiu to Bâlea Lake, 160 km (99 mi)

The second stage of the race featured a route of 160 kilometres (99 miles) including a final climb of 20 kilometres (12 miles) on the Transfăgărășan to Bâlea Lake. The early part of the race featured a breakaway from which, with 10 kilometres (6 miles) remaining, there was just one survivor – Nikodemus Holler of Bike Aid. Holler was eventually caught by the chasing group with 9 kilometres (6 miles) to race.

Soon afterwards, overall leader Edwin Ávila (Team Illuminate) was dropped by the small leading group and with 6 kilometres (4 miles) remaining a pair of riders – Daniel Jaramillo (UnitedHealthcare) and Gabriel Reguero (Differdange–Losch) – attacked. A counter-attack from Egan Bernal (Androni–Sidermec–Bottecchia) saw him catch and then pass the two escapees, and he continued to build a lead over the chasing group. The other contenders were unable to respond and Bernal won the stage by over a minute.

Stage 2 result
Rank	Rider	Team	Time
1	Egan Bernal (COL)	Androni–Sidermec–Bottecchia	4h 10' 28"
2	Colin Stüssi (SUI)	Roth–Akros	+ 1' 22"
3	Jonathan Clarke (AUS)	UnitedHealthcare	+ 1' 24"
4	Valentin Baillifard (SUI)	Roth–Akros	+ 1' 25"
5	Ettore Carlini (ITA)	D'Amico Utensilnord	+ 1' 33"
6	Cristian Raileanu (MDA)	Differdange–Losch	+ 1' 36"
7	Janier Acevedo (COL)	UnitedHealthcare	+ 1' 38"
8	Antonino Parrinello (ITA)	GM Europa Ovini	+ 1' 38"
9	Roland Thalmann (SUI)	Roth–Akros	+ 1' 40"
10	Žiga Grošelj (SVN)	Adria Mobil	+ 1' 42"

General classification after Stage 2
Rank	Rider	Team	Time
1	Egan Bernal (COL)	Androni–Sidermec–Bottecchia	9h 16' 16"
2	Colin Stüssi (SUI)	Roth–Akros	+ 1' 25"
3	Jonathan Clarke (AUS)	UnitedHealthcare	+ 1' 33"
4	Valentin Baillifard (SUI)	Roth–Akros	+ 1' 36"
5	Janier Acevedo (COL)	UnitedHealthcare	+ 1' 46"
6	Simone Ponzi (ITA)	CCC–Sprandi–Polkowice	+ 1' 46"
7	Roland Thalmann (SUI)	Roth–Akros	+ 1' 49"
8	Ettore Carlini (ITA)	D'Amico Utensilnord	+ 1' 50"
9	Žiga Grošelj (SVN)	Adria Mobil	+ 1' 55"
10	Marco Tizza (ITA)	GM Europa Ovini	+ 2' 04"

=== Stage 3 ===
8 July 2017 — Sibiu to Păltiniș, 211.5 km (131 mi)

An early breakaway of five riders, including the leader of the mountains classification, Moritz Fußnegger (0711 / Cycling) built up a lead of around 7 minutes. By the penultimate climb at Jina, the remainder of the breakaway had a 1' 30" advantage over the chasing peloton, before being caught and passed by two attackers – Simon Pellaud (Team Illuminate) and Andrea Borso (Adria Mobil). This pair in turn were caught by a small group of riders with 10 kilometres (6.2 miles) remaining and from that group it was once more Egan Bernal (Androni–Sidermec–Bottecchia) who attacked in the closing stages, and with the rest of the riders unable to respond, claimed his second successive stage victory, further extending his overall lead.

Stage 3 result
Rank	Rider	Team	Time
1	Egan Bernal (COL)	Androni–Sidermec–Bottecchia	5h 41' 26"
2	Colin Stüssi (SUI)	Roth–Akros	+ 11"
3	Cristian Raileanu (MDA)	Differdange–Losch	+ 21"
4	Marco Tizza (ITA)	GM Europa Ovini	+ 25"
5	Valentin Baillifard (SUI)	Roth–Akros	+ 29"
6	Jonathan Clarke (AUS)	UnitedHealthcare	+ 34"
7	Federico Canuti (ITA)	D'Amico Utensilnord	+ 45"
8	Gabriel Reguero (ESP)	Differdange–Losch	+ 1' 51"
9	Nikodemus Holler (GER)	Bike Aid	+ 2' 00"
10	Simone Ponzi (ITA)	CCC–Sprandi–Polkowice	+ 2' 00"

General classification after Stage 3
Rank	Rider	Team	Time
1	Egan Bernal (COL)	Androni–Sidermec–Bottecchia	14h 57' 32"
2	Colin Stüssi (SUI)	Roth–Akros	+ 1' 40"
3	Valentin Baillifard (SUI)	Roth–Akros	+ 2' 15"
4	Jonathan Clarke (AUS)	UnitedHealthcare	+ 2' 17"
5	Marco Tizza (ITA)	GM Europa Ovini	+ 2' 39"
6	Cristian Raileanu (MDA)	Differdange–Losch	+ 3' 35"
7	Simone Ponzi (ITA)	CCC–Sprandi–Polkowice	+ 3' 55"
8	Ettore Carlini (ITA)	D'Amico Utensilnord	+ 4' 07"
9	Antonino Parrinello (ITA)	GM Europa Ovini	+ 4' 23"
10	Maxim Rusnac (MDA)	Differdange–Losch	+ 4' 24"

=== Stage 4 ===
9 July 2017 — Sibiu to Sibiu, 148.4 km (92 mi)

Stage 4 result
Rank	Rider	Team	Time
1	Eduard-Michael Grosu (ROM)	Romania (national team)	3h 21' 24"
2	Maciej Paterski (POL)	CCC–Sprandi–Polkowice	+ 0"
3	Francesco Gavazzi (ITA)	Androni–Sidermec–Bottecchia	+ 0"
4	Andrea Palini (ITA)	Androni–Sidermec–Bottecchia	+ 0"
5	Edwin Ávila (COL)	Team Illuminate	+ 0"
6	Nicklas Overgaard Pedersen (DEN)	Team Giant–Castelli	+ 0"
7	Gašper Katrašnik (SLO)	Adria Mobil	+ 0"
8	Angelo Raffaele (ITA)	D'Amico Utensilnord	+ 0"
9	Daniel Jaramillo (COL)	UnitedHealthcare	+ 0"
10	Fabio Tommassini (ITA)	D'Amico Utensilnord	+ 0"

Final general classification
Rank	Rider	Team	Time
1	Egan Bernal (COL)	Androni–Sidermec–Bottecchia	18h 18' 56"
2	Colin Stüssi (SUI)	Roth–Akros	+ 1' 40"
3	Valentin Baillifard (SUI)	Roth–Akros	+ 2' 15"
4	Jonathan Clarke (AUS)	UnitedHealthcare	+ 2' 17"
5	Marco Tizza (ITA)	GM Europa Ovini	+ 2' 39"
6	Cristian Raileanu (MDA)	Differdange–Losch	+ 3' 35"
7	Simone Ponzi (ITA)	CCC–Sprandi–Polkowice	+ 3' 55"
8	Ettore Carlini (ITA)	D'Amico Utensilnord	+ 4' 07"
9	Antonino Parrinello (ITA)	GM Europa Ovini	+ 4' 23"
10	Maxim Rusnac (MDA)	Differdange–Losch	+ 4' 24"

== Classification leadership table ==
In the 2017 Sibiu Cycling Tour, six different jerseys were awarded. The most important was the general classification, which was calculated by adding each cyclist's finishing times on each stage. Time bonuses were awarded to the first three finishers on all stages with the exception of the time trial: the stage winner won a ten-second bonus, with six and four seconds for the second and third riders respectively. Bonus seconds were also awarded to the first three riders at intermediate sprints; three seconds for the winner of the sprint, two seconds for the rider in second and one second for the rider in third. The rider with the least accumulated time is the race leader, identified by a yellow jersey. This classification was considered the most important of the 2017 Sibiu Cycling Tour, and the winner of the classification was considered the winner of the race.

Points for the mountains classification
Position	1	2	3	4	5	6	7	8	9	10
Points for Category SA	20	18	16	14	12	10	8	7	6	5
Points for Category A	12	8	6	4	2	0				
Points for Category B	6	4	2	0						
Points for Category C	3	2	1	0						

There was also a mountains classification, the leadership of which was marked by a green jersey. In the mountains classification, points towards the classification were won by reaching the top of a climb before other cyclists. Each climb was categorised as either category SA, A, B or C, with more points available for the higher-categorised climbs. The third jersey represented the young rider classification, marked by a white jersey. This was decided the same way as the general classification, but only riders born on or after 1 January 1994 were eligible to be ranked in the classification.

Additionally, there was a points classification, which awarded a white jersey. In the points classification, cyclists received points for finishing in the top 15 in a stage, and unlike in the points classification in the Tour de France, the winners of all stages (with the exception of the prologue) were awarded the same number of points. For winning a stage, a rider earned 25 points, with 20 for second, 16 for third, 14 for fourth, 12 for fifth, 10 for sixth with a point fewer per place down to a single point for 15th place. The fifth classification was the sprints classification, the leader of which was awarded a blue jersey. In the sprints classification, riders received points for finishing in the top three at intermediate sprint points during each stage – awarded on a 3–2–1 scale – and these intermediate sprints also offered bonus seconds towards the general classification as noted above.

The sixth and final jersey represented the classification for Romanian riders, marked by a red jersey. This was decided the same way as the general classification, but only riders born in Romania were eligible to be ranked in the classification. There was also a team classification, in which the times of the best three cyclists per team on each stage were added together; the leading team at the end of the race was the team with the lowest total time.

Stage	Winner	General classification	Points classification	Mountains classification	Young rider classification	Sprints classification	Romanian rider classification	Teams classification
P	Andrea Palini	Andrea Palini	Not awarded	Not awarded	Gašper Katrašnik	Not awarded	Eduard-Michael Grosu	Androni–Sidermec–Bottecchia
1	Edwin Ávila	Edwin Ávila	Edwin Ávila (Note: In stage 2, Simone Ponzi, who was third in the points classification, wore the white points jersey, because Edwin Ávila (in first place) wore the yellow jersey as leader of the general classification and Eduard-Michael Grosu (in second place) wore the red jersey as leader of the Romanian rider classification.)	Moritz Fußnegger	Gašper Katrašnik	Edwin Ávila (Note: In stage 2, Daniel Crista, who was third in the sprints classification, wore the blue sprints jersey, because Edwin Ávila (in first place) wore the yellow jersey as leader of the general classification and Moritz Fußnegger (in second place) wore the green jersey as leader of the mountains classification.)	Eduard-Michael Grosu	Team Illuminate
2	Egan Bernal	Egan Bernal	Egan Bernal (Note: In stage 3, Edwin Ávila, who was second in the points classification, wore the white points jersey, because Egan Bernal (in first place) wore the yellow jersey as leader of the general classification. As Bernal also led the young rider classification, Maxim Rusnac, who was second in the classification, wore the orange young riders jersey.) (Note: In stage 4, Colin Stüssi, who was second in the points classification, wore the white points jersey, because Egan Bernal (in first place) wore the yellow jersey as leader of the general classification. As Bernal also led the young rider classification, Salim Kipkemboi, who was second in the classification, wore the orange young riders jersey.)	Moritz Fußnegger	Egan Bernal	Germán Tivani	Eduard-Michael Grosu	Roth–Akros
3	Egan Bernal	Egan Bernal	Egan Bernal	Moritz Fußnegger	Egan Bernal	Germán Tivani	Eduard-Michael Grosu	Roth–Akros
4	Eduard-Michael Grosu	Egan Bernal	Egan Bernal	Moritz Fußnegger	Egan Bernal	Damian Lüscher	Eduard-Michael Grosu	Roth–Akros
Final		Egan Bernal	Egan Bernal	Moritz Fußnegger	Egan Bernal	Damian Lüscher	Eduard-Michael Grosu	Roth–Akros
