= Valentin Baillifard =

Swiss cyclist

Personal information
- Born: 25 December 1993 (age 32) Bagnes, Switzerland
- Height: 1.69 m (5 ft 7 in)
- Weight: 54 kg (119 lb)

Cycling career
- Sport: Cycling
- Current team: Retired
- Discipline: Road
- Role: Rider

Amateur teams
- 2008–2011: BMC–Sogecoma–Hottinger–Valais
- 2012: Roth Échafaudages
- 2013–2015: BMC Development Team

Professional team
- 2016–2017: Team Roth

Valentin Baillifard (born 25 December 1993) is a Swiss former professional cyclist.

== Major results ==
2010
1st Junior race, National Hill Climb Championships
2011
1st Junior race, National Hill Climb Championships
2012
1st Junior race, National Hill Climb Championships
2015
1st Combination classification, Tour des Pays de Savoie
2017
3rd Overall Sibiu Cycling Tour
6th Overall Tour of Almaty
