= Andrea Vaccher =

Italian cyclist

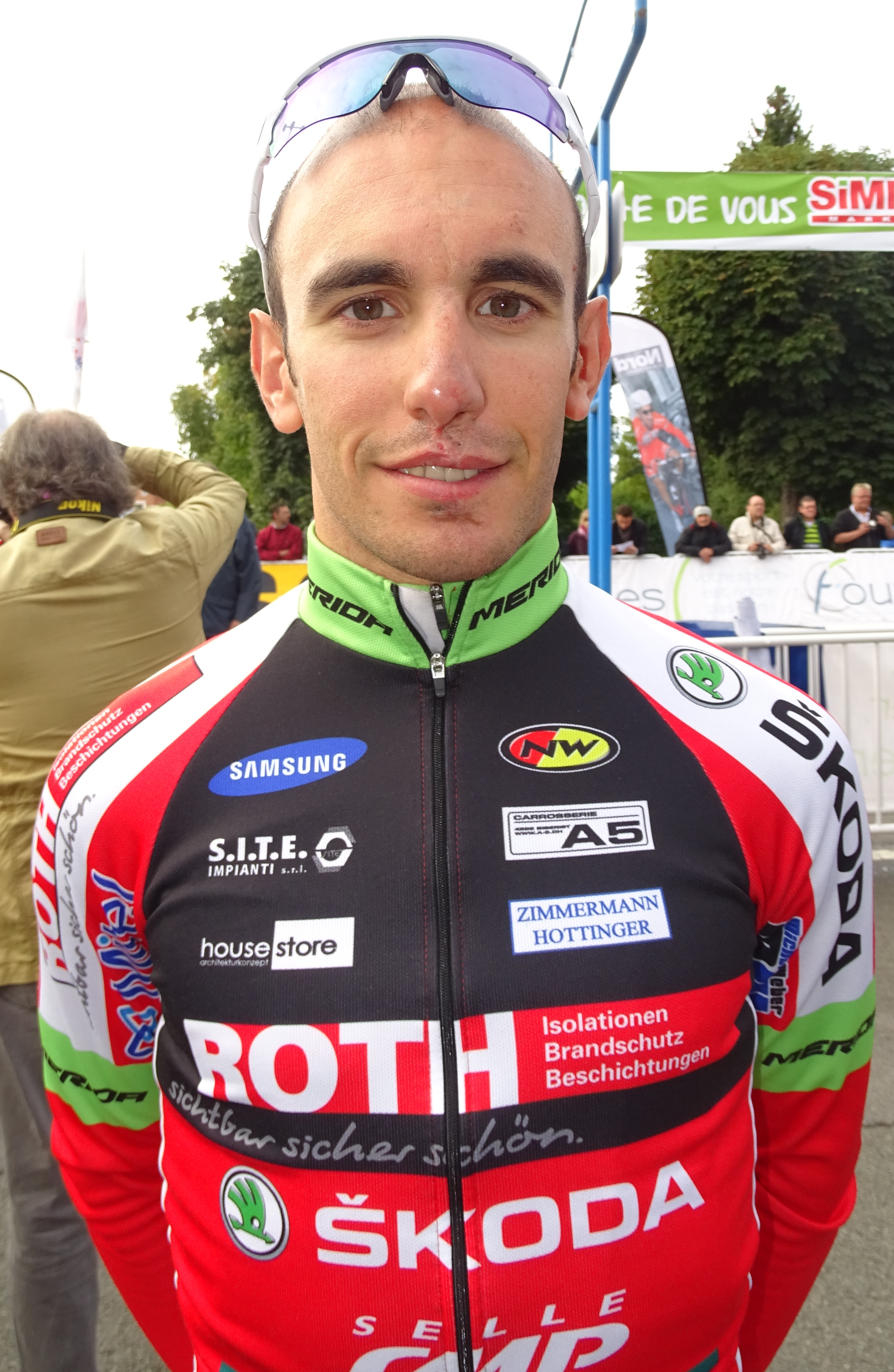
- Grand Prix de Fourmies, 6 septembre 2015

Personal information
- Full name: Andrea Vaccher
- Born: 21 December 1988 (age 37)

Cycling career
- Sport: Cycling
- Discipline: Road
- Role: Rider

Amateur teams
- 2007: Modall Bici San Donà
- 2008: Basso Piave TMS Spinazzè
- 2009: Marchiol–Pasta Montegrappa–Site–Heraclia
- 2009: Zalf Désirée Fior
- 2010: Reale Mutua–ORT
- 2010–2011: Zalf Désirée Fior
- 2012–2013: Marchiol–Emisfero–Site

Professional teams
- 2014–2016: Marchiol–Emisfero
- 2014: Lampre–Merida (stagiaire)

Andrea Vaccher (born 21 December 1988) is a former Italian cyclist, who competed professionally for Team Roth between 2014 and 2016.

== Major results ==
2009
1st Coppa Collecchio
2010
2nd Trofeo Città di San Vendemiano
7th Giro del Casentino
2011
6th Giro del Medio Brenta
2012
5th Ruota d'Oro
6th Trofeo Franco Balestra
2014
1st Trofeo Edil C
1st Stage 1a (TTT) Giro del Friuli-Venezia Giulia
3rd Grand Prix Sarajevo
7th Giro del Medio Brenta
9th GP Capodarco
2015
9th Overall Oberösterreich Rundfahrt
