= Alberto Cecchin =

Italian bicycle racer

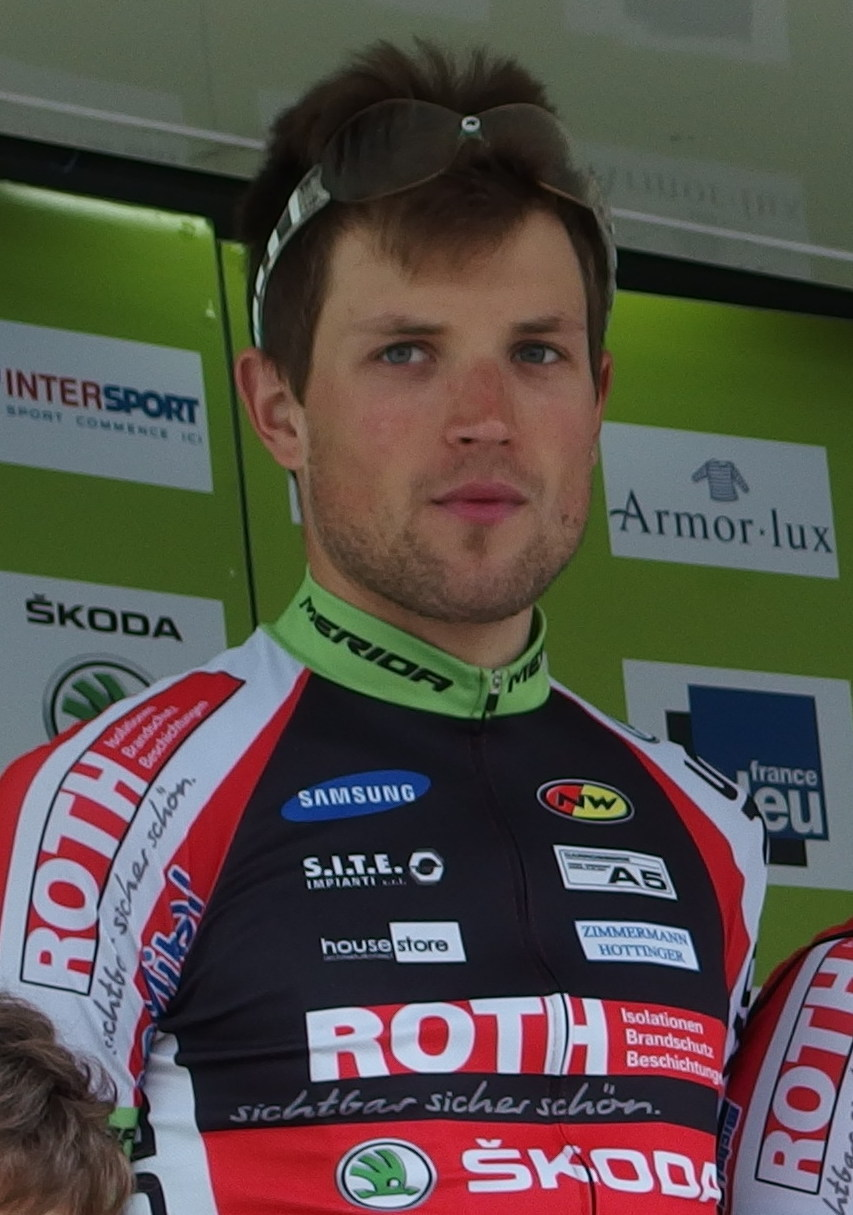
- Cecchin in 2015.

Personal information
- Full name: Alberto Cecchin
- Born: 8 August 1989 (age 37) Feltre, Italy

Cycling career
- Sport: Cycling
- Current team: Retired
- Discipline: Road
- Role: Rider

Amateur teams
- 2008–2011: Zalf–Désirée–Fior
- 2012: Marchiol–Emisfero–Site

Professional teams
- 2013: Team Nippo–De Rosa
- 2014–2016: Marchiol–Emisfero
- 2017: Wilier Triestina–Selle Italia

Alberto Cecchin (born 8 August 1989) is an Italian former professional cyclist, who rode professionally between 2013 and 2017 for the Team Nippo–De Rosa, Team Roth and Wilier Triestina–Selle Italia teams.

== Major results ==
2011
3rd Trofeo Alcide Degasperi
2012
10th Trofeo Franco Balestra
2013
1st Points classification Tour de Korea
6th Coppa Bernocchi
8th Overall Flèche du Sud

1st Stage 4

10th Overall Tour de Hokkaido
2014
1st Stage 1a (TTT) Giro della Regione Friuli Venezia Giulia
4th Trofeo Alcide Degasperi
9th Giro del Medio Brenta
2015
1st Trofeo Alcide Degasperi
1st Stage 2 Ronde van Midden-Nederland
3rd Paris–Chauny
4th Grand Prix de la ville de Nogent-sur-Oise
4th Grand Prix des Marbriers
6th Trofeo Edil C
9th Tour de Berne
10th Rund um Köln
2016
2nd GP Adria Mobil
4th Overall Tour of Qinghai Lake
4th Dorpenomloop Rucphen
2017
3rd Overall Tour de Langkawi
4th Overall Tour of China II
6th Overall Tour de Korea
