= Filippo Zaccanti =

Italian bicycle racer

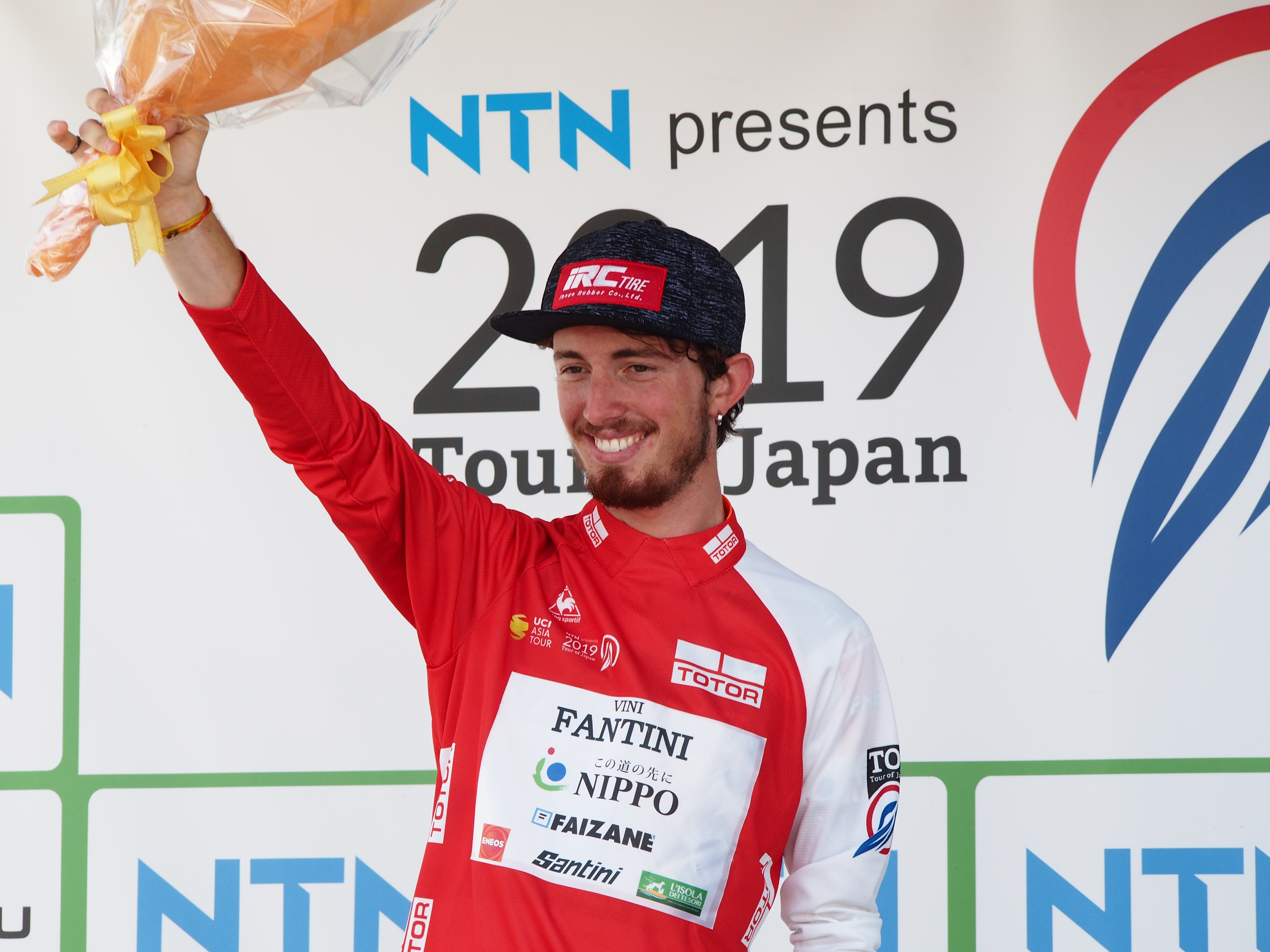
- Zaccanti at the 2019 Tour of Japan

Personal information
- Born: 12 September 1995 (age 31) Bergamo, Italy

Cycling career
- Sport: Cycling
- Discipline: Road
- Role: Rider
- Rider type: Climber

Amateur team
- 2014–2017: Team Colpack

Professional teams
- 2018–2019: Nippo–Vini Fantini–Europa Ovini
- 2020–2021: Bardiani–CSF–Faizanè

Filippo Zaccanti (born 12 September 1995) is an Italian cyclist, who last rode for UCI ProTeam Bardiani–CSF 7 Saber.

== Major results ==
2017
4th GP Capodarco
2019
1st Overall Tour de Hokkaido

1st Stage 1

1st Overall Tour de Korea
1st Mountains classification Tour of Japan
