= Bernardo Riccio =

Italian cyclist

Personal information
- Born: 21 March 1985 (age 41) Caserta, Italy

Cycling career
- Sport: Cycling
- Current team: Retired
- Discipline: Road
- Role: Rider

Amateur team
- 2007: Tinkoff Credit Systems (stagiaire)

Professional teams
- 2008: Tinkoff Credit Systems
- 2009: Ceramica Flaminia–Bossini Docce
- 2010–2011: CDC–Cavaliere

Bernardo Riccio (born 21 March 1985) is an Italian former professional road cyclist.

== Major results ==
2005
6th Coppa Citta di Asti
2008
1st Stage 3 Clásica Internacional de Alcobendas
8th GP Costa Degli Etruschi
2011
1st Stages 5 & 7 Tour of South Africa
3rd GP Nobili Rubinetterie
