= Nicolas Marini =

Italian cyclist

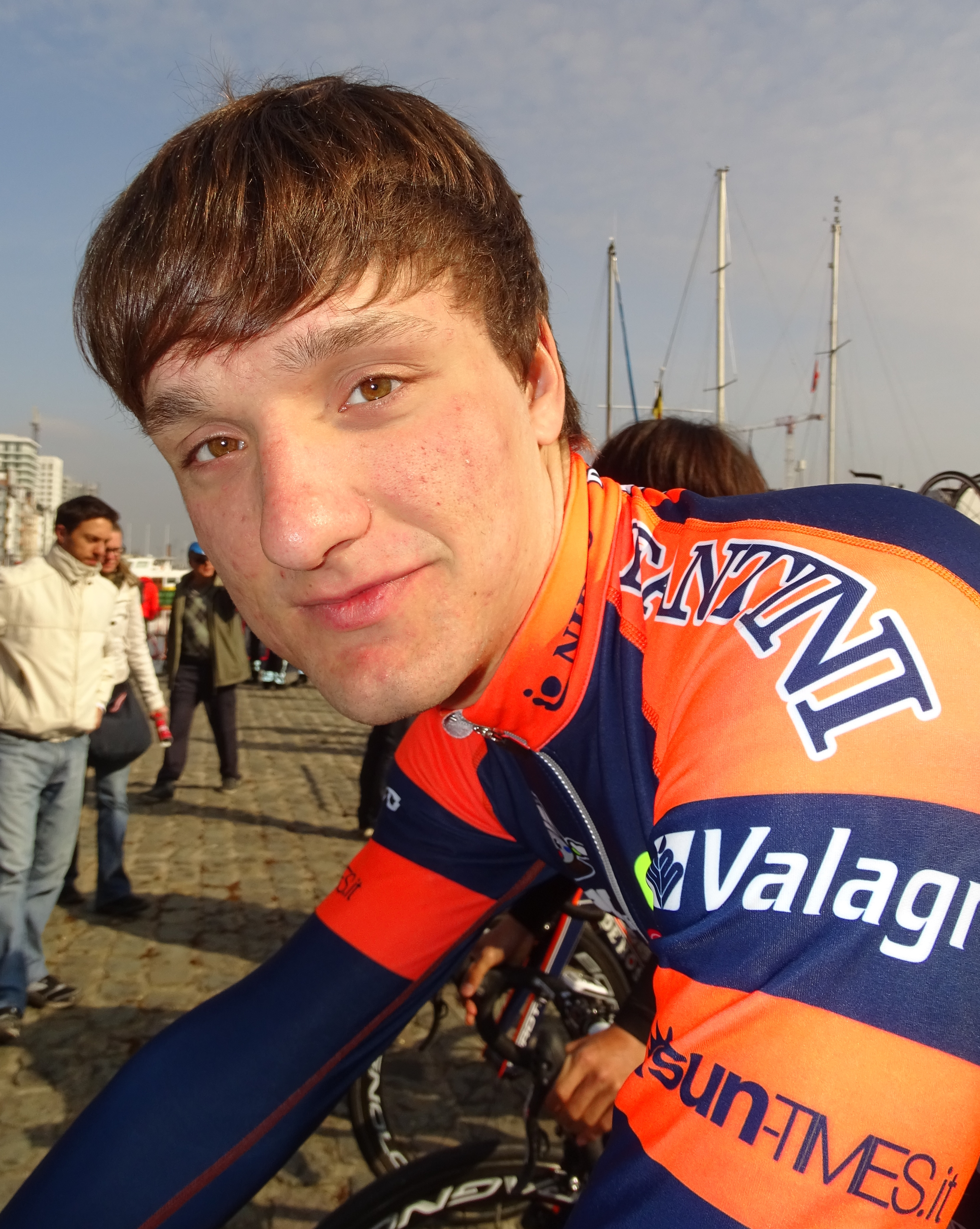
- Marini at the 2015 Scheldeprijs.

Personal information
- Full name: Nicolas Marini
- Born: 29 July 1993 (age 33) Iseo, Italy

Cycling career
- Sport: Cycling
- Discipline: Road
- Role: Rider

Amateur teams
- 2012: Casati–MI Impianti
- 2013–2014: Zalf–Euromobil–Désirée–Fior

Professional teams
- 2015–2017: Nippo–Vini Fantini
- 2018: MsTina–Focus
- 2019–2020: Qinghai Lianshi Sports Cycling Team

Nicolas Marini (born 29 July 1993) is an Italian professional racing cyclist, who most recently rode for UCI Continental team Tianyoude Hotel Cycling Team.

== Major results ==
2010
2nd Mixed team, Summer Youth Olympics
2011
8th Road race, UCI Junior Road World Championships
2014
1st La Popolarissima
3rd Circuito del Porto
2015
1st Stage 3 Tour of Japan
2nd Overall Tour of China II

1st Stages 2, 3 & 6

7th Scheldeprijs
2016
1st Stage 8 Tour of Qinghai Lake
1st Stage 5 Tour of China I
1st Stage 4 Tour of Taihu Lake
10th Overall Tour of China II
2017
1st Stage 12 Tour of Qinghai Lake
1st Stage 1 Tour of Taihu Lake
2018
1st Stage 2 Tour of Albania
