= Leonardo Pinizzotto =

Italian cyclist

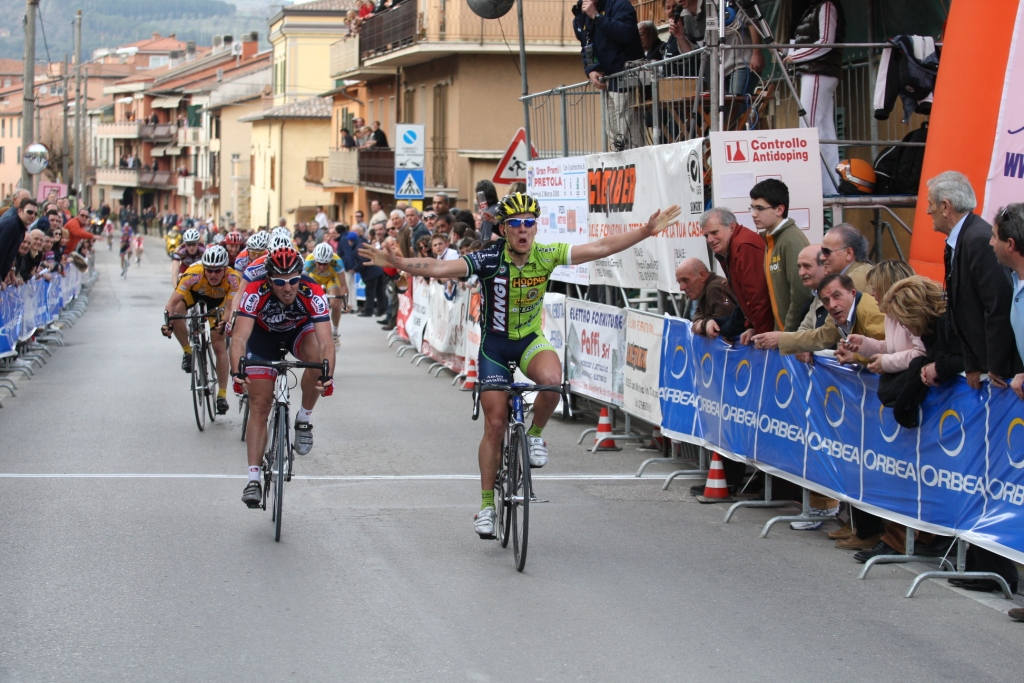
- Leonardo Pinizzotto at the 2008 Pretola GP

Personal information
- Full name: Leonardo Pinizzotto
- Born: 14 August 1986 (age 40)

Cycling career
- Sport: Cycling
- Discipline: Road
- Role: Rider

Professional teams
- 2010–2011: Miche
- 2013: Team Nippo-De Rosa
- 2014: Amore & Vita-Selle SMP

Leonardo Pinizzotto (born 14 August 1986) is an Italian cyclist, who last rode for UCI Continental team Amore & Vita-Selle SMP in 2014 season.

== Palmarès ==
2008
1st Coppa Collecchio
2011
1st, Stage 12 Tour du Maroc
2013
1st, Stage 3 Boucle de l'Artois
1st, Stage 1 Tour de Hokkaido
2014
1st, Stage 4 Tour de Beauce
