= Universal File Format =

File format

Universal File Format is a file format originally developed by the Structural Dynamics Research Corporation (SDRC) to standardize data transfer between computer aided design (CAD) and computer aided test (CAT) software packages.
