= Restrepo, Meta =

Coordinates: 4.25°N 73.5667°W

- Municipality and town
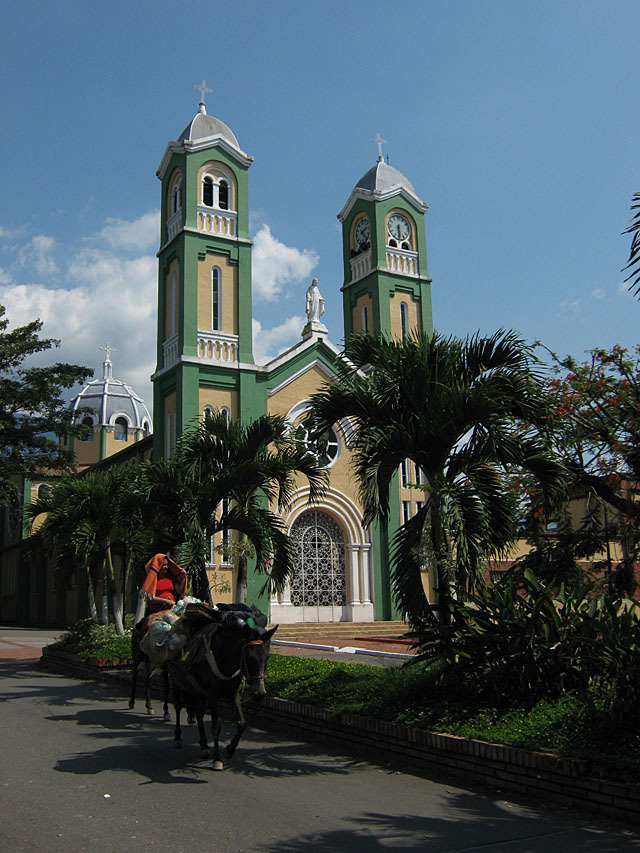

- Flag Coat of arms

- Location of the municipality and town of Restrepo, Meta in the Meta Department of Colombia.
- Country: Colombia
- Department: Meta Department

Area
  - Total: 289 km^{2} (112 sq mi)
- Elevation: 570 m (1,870 ft)

Population (Census 2018)
  - Total: 17,610
  - Density: 60.9/km^{2} (158/sq mi)
- Time zone: UTC-5 (Colombia Standard Time)
- Climate: Af

Restrepo is a town and municipality in the Meta Department, Colombia.

== Climate ==
Restrepo has a tropical rainforest climate (Köppen Af) with very heavy rainfall year round and extremely heavy rainfall from April to October. Precipitation exceeds 1,000 millimetres (40 inches) during the months of May and June. It is the wettest place in the department of Meta, and one of the wettest places in the world, receiving comparable rainfall to the more famously wet Chocó region on the opposite side of the Andes.

Climate data for Restrepo (Salinas de Upin), elevation 450 m (1,480 ft), (1971–2000)
Month	Jan	Feb	Mar	Apr	May	Jun	Jul	Aug	Sep	Oct	Nov	Dec	Year
Mean daily maximum °C (°F)	29.2 (84.6)	29.1 (84.4)	28.7 (83.7)	28.1 (82.6)	27.5 (81.5)	26.2 (79.2)	26.5 (79.7)	27.2 (81.0)	28.0 (82.4)	28.0 (82.4)	27.9 (82.2)	28.3 (82.9)	27.9 (82.2)
Daily mean °C (°F)	24.3 (75.7)	25.0 (77.0)	24.5 (76.1)	23.5 (74.3)	23.0 (73.4)	22.2 (72.0)	21.9 (71.4)	22.4 (72.3)	22.8 (73.0)	23.1 (73.6)	23.2 (73.8)	23.4 (74.1)	23.3 (73.9)
Mean daily minimum °C (°F)	20.8 (69.4)	21.8 (71.2)	21.1 (70.0)	20.3 (68.5)	20.0 (68.0)	19.3 (66.7)	19.0 (66.2)	19.4 (66.9)	19.3 (66.7)	19.4 (66.9)	20.1 (68.2)	20.2 (68.4)	20.1 (68.2)
Average precipitation mm (inches)	60.5 (2.38)	113.0 (4.45)	207.4 (8.17)	544.4 (21.43)	667.3 (26.27)	627.1 (24.69)	544.7 (21.44)	499.8 (19.68)	413.5 (16.28)	535.0 (21.06)	407.5 (16.04)	184.7 (7.27)	4,804.9 (189.17)
Average precipitation days	9	10	17	24	27	27	26	24	22	23	22	15	247
Average relative humidity (%)	76	74	78	85	88	90	88	87	86	86	86	84	84
Mean monthly sunshine hours	114.7	98.9	71.3	75.0	89.9	69.0	80.6	108.5	117.0	120.9	105.0	111.6	1,162.4
Mean daily sunshine hours	3.7	3.5	2.3	2.5	2.9	2.3	2.6	3.5	3.9	3.9	3.5	3.6	3.2
Source: Instituto de Hidrologia Meteorologia y Estudios Ambientales
