= Team UFF =

Team information
- UCI code: UFF
- Registered: Brazil
- Founded: 2017
- Discipline: Road
- Status: UCI Continental

Team name history
- 2017–: Team UFF

Team UFF is a Brazilian UCI Continental cycling team established in 2017.
