= Nippo–Vini Fantini–Faizanè =

Cycling team

Team information
- UCI code: NIP
- Registered: Serbia (2008); Italy (2009–2011); Japan (2012–2014); Italy (2015–2019)
- Founded: 2008
- Disbanded: 2019
- Discipline: Road
- Status: UCI Continental (2008–2014); UCI Professional Continental (2015–2019)
- Bicycles: De Rosa
- Website: Team home page

Key personnel
- General manager: Francesco Pelosi
- Team manager: Hiroshi Daimon

Team name history
- 2008–2009 2010 2011 2012 2013 2014 2015–2017 2018 2019: Centri della Calzatura–Partizan; Centri della Calzatura–Cavaliere; D'Angelo & Antenucci–Nippo; Team Nippo; Team Nippo–De Rosa; Vini Fantini–Nippo; Nippo–Vini Fantini; Nippo–Vini Fantini–Europa Ovini; Nippo–Vini Fantini–Faizanè
Nippo–Vini Fantini–Faizanè jersey
Jersey

Nippo–Vini Fantini–Faizanè (UCI team code: NIP) was a UCI Professional Continental cycling team based in Italy. The team was founded as Centri della Calzatura–Partizan in 2008.

The team folded after the 2019 season, due to financial reasons following restructuring of the UCI World Tour.

== Doping ==
On December 21, 2017, Pierpaolo De Negri tested positive for anabolic androgenic steroids.

== Final roster ==
As of 31 December 2019.

Rider	Date of birth
Rubén Darío Acosta (COL)	20 August 1996 (aged 23)
Nicola Bagioli (ITA)	19 February 1995 (aged 24)
Joan Bou (ESP)	16 January 1997 (aged 22)
Marco Canola (ITA)	26 December 1988 (aged 31)
Damiano Cima (ITA)	13 September 1993 (aged 26)
Imerio Cima (ITA)	29 October 1997 (aged 22)
Sho Hatsuyama (JPN)	17 August 1988 (aged 31)
Masakazu Ito (JPN)	12 June 1988 (aged 31)

Rider	Date of birth
Juan José Lobato (ESP)	30 December 1988 (aged 31)
Giovanni Lonardi (ITA)	9 November 1996 (aged 23)
Hideto Nakane (JPN)	2 May 1990 (aged 29)
Hiroki Nishimura (JPN)	20 October 1994 (aged 25)
Alejandro Osorio (COL)	28 May 1998 (aged 21)
Ivan Santaromita (ITA)	30 April 1984 (aged 35)
Hayato Yoshida (JPN)	19 May 1989 (aged 30)
Filippo Zaccanti (ITA)	12 September 1995 (aged 24)

== Major wins ==
2008
Overall Cinturó de L'Empordà, Luca Zanasca

Stage 1, Luca Zanasca

2009
GP Industria & Artigianato di Larciano, Daniele Callegarin
Stage 1 Szlakiem Grodów Piastowskich, Daniele Callegarin
Overall Tour de Serbie, Davide Torosantucci

Stage 2, Yahuen Sobal

Overall Course de Solidarność et des Champions Olympiques, Artur Krol

Stage 3, Artur Krol

Overall Gp Cycliste de Gemenc, Zsolt Dér
Stage 5 Vuelta Ciclista a León, Luca Zanasca

2010
Stage 3 Giro della Provincia di Reggio Calabria, Giuseppe Muraglia
Overall Tour de Serbie, Luca Ascani

Stage 6, Davide D'Angelo

2011
Stage 6 Tour de San Luis, Miguel Ángel Rubiano
Stage 4 Tour of South Africa, Davide Torosantucci
Stages 5 & 7 Tour of South Africa, Bernardo Riccio
Overall Tour de Kumano, Fortunato Baliani

Prologue, Maximiliano Richeze
Stage 2, Fortunato Baliani

Stages 1, 6 & 7 Okolo Slovenska, Maximiliano Richeze
Stage 3 Okolo Slovenska, Miguel Ángel Rubiano
Overall Brixia Tour, Fortunato Baliani
Stage 3 Tour de Hokkaido, Junya Sano
Stage 4 Tour de Hokkaido, Miguel Ángel Rubiano

2012
Pan American Road Race Championship, Maximiliano Richeze
Stage 1 Tour de Korea, Mauro Richeze
Overall Tour of Japan, Fortunato Baliani

Stage 2, Maximiliano Richeze
Stage 3, Julián Arredondo
Stage 4, Fortunato Baliani

Overall Tour de Kumano, Fortunato Baliani

Stage 1, Maximiliano Richeze
Stage 2, Fortunato Baliani
Stage 3, Mauro Richeze

Stages 1, 5 & 6 Tour de Serbie, Maximiliano Richeze
Stage 4 Tour de Serbie, Fortunato Baliani
Stages 1, 7, 8 & 10 Vuelta a Venezuela, Maximiliano Richeze
Stage 4 Tour de la Guadelupe, Simone Campagnaro
Overall Tour de Hokkaido, Maximiliano Richeze

Stages 2 & 3, Maximiliano Richeze

2013
Overall Tour de Langkawi, Julián Arredondo

Stage 5, Julián Arredondo

Stage 3 Boucle de l'Artois, Leonardo Pinizzotto
Stages 3 & 4 Mzansi Tour, Mauro Richeze
Stage 2 Flèche du Sud, Mauro Richeze
Stage 4 Flèche du Sud, Alberto Cecchin
Overall Tour of Japan, Fortunato Baliani
Overall Tour de Kumano, Julián Arredondo

Stage 2, Julián Arredondo

Stages 2 & 5 Tour de Serbie, Mauro Richeze
Stage 1 Tour de Hokkaido, Leonardo Pinizzotto

2014
Stage 1 Circuit des Ardennes, Pierpaolo De Negri
Stage 3 Circuit des Ardennes, Grega Bole
Stages 5 & 6 Carpathian Couriers Race, Eduard-Michael Grosu
Stage 1 Szlakiem Grodów Piastowskich, Grega Bole
Stage 3 Tour of Japan, Pierpaolo De Negri
Overall Tour of Estonia, Eduard-Michael Grosu

Stage 1, Eduard-Michael Grosu

Stage 1 Tour de Korea, Grega Bole
Japan Under-23 Time Trial Championships, Manabu Ishibashi
Stages 6 & 10 Tour of Qinghai Lake, Grega Bole
Stage 12 Tour of Qinghai Lake, Eduard-Michael Grosu
Stage 1 Tour de Hokkaido, Alessandro Malaguti

2015
Stage 3 Tour of Japan, Nicolas Marini
Stage 2 Tour of Slovenia, Pierpaolo De Negri
Overall Tour de Hokkaido, Riccardo Stacchiotti

Stages 1 & 3, Riccardo Stacchiotti
Stage 2, Daniele Colli

Overall, Tour of China I, Daniele Colli

Stage 4, Daniele Colli

Stages 2, 3 & 6 Tour of China II, Nicolas Marini

2016
Gran Premio della Costa Etruschi, Grega Bole
Overall Tour de Korea, Grega Bole
Stage 8 Tour of Qinghai Lake, Nicolas Marini
Stage 3 Tour de Hokkaido, Pierpaolo De Negri
Stage 5 Tour of China I, Nicolas Marini
Stage 4 Tour of Taihu Lake, Nicolas Marini
Stage 5 Tour of Taihu Lake, Eduard-Michael Grosu

2017
Volta Limburg Classic, Marco Canola
Stages 2, 3 & 5 Tour of Japan, Marco Canola
Romania Time Trial Championships, Eduard-Michael Grosu
Stage 6 Tour of Qinghai Lake, Damiano Cunego
Stage 12 Tour of Qinghai Lake, Nicolas Marini
Stage 7 Tour of Utah, Marco Canola
Stage 1 Tour of Taihu Lake, Nicolas Marini

2018
Stage 2 Tour of Croatia, Eduard Grosu
Romania Time Trial Championships, Eduard-Michael Grosu
Romania Road Race Championships, Eduard-Michael Grosu
Stages 3, 7 & 8 Tour of Qinghai Lake, Eduard Grosu
Overall Tour of Xingtai, Damiano Cima

Stage 1, Damiano Cima

Stage 6 Tour of China I, Damiano Cima
Coppa Sabatini, Juan José Lobato
Tour de Okinawa, Alan Marangoni

2019
Stage 5 Tour de Taiwan, Giovanni Lonardi
Stage 1 The Princess Maha Chakri Sirindhorn's Cup, Giovanni Lonardi
Stage 18 Giro d'Italia, Damiano Cima
Overall Tour de Korea, Filippo Zaccanti
Stage 4 Tour of Utah, Marco Canola
Overall Tour de Hokkaido, Filippo Zaccanti

Stage 1, Filippo Zaccanti
