= Akros–Excelsior–Thömus =

Swiss cycling team

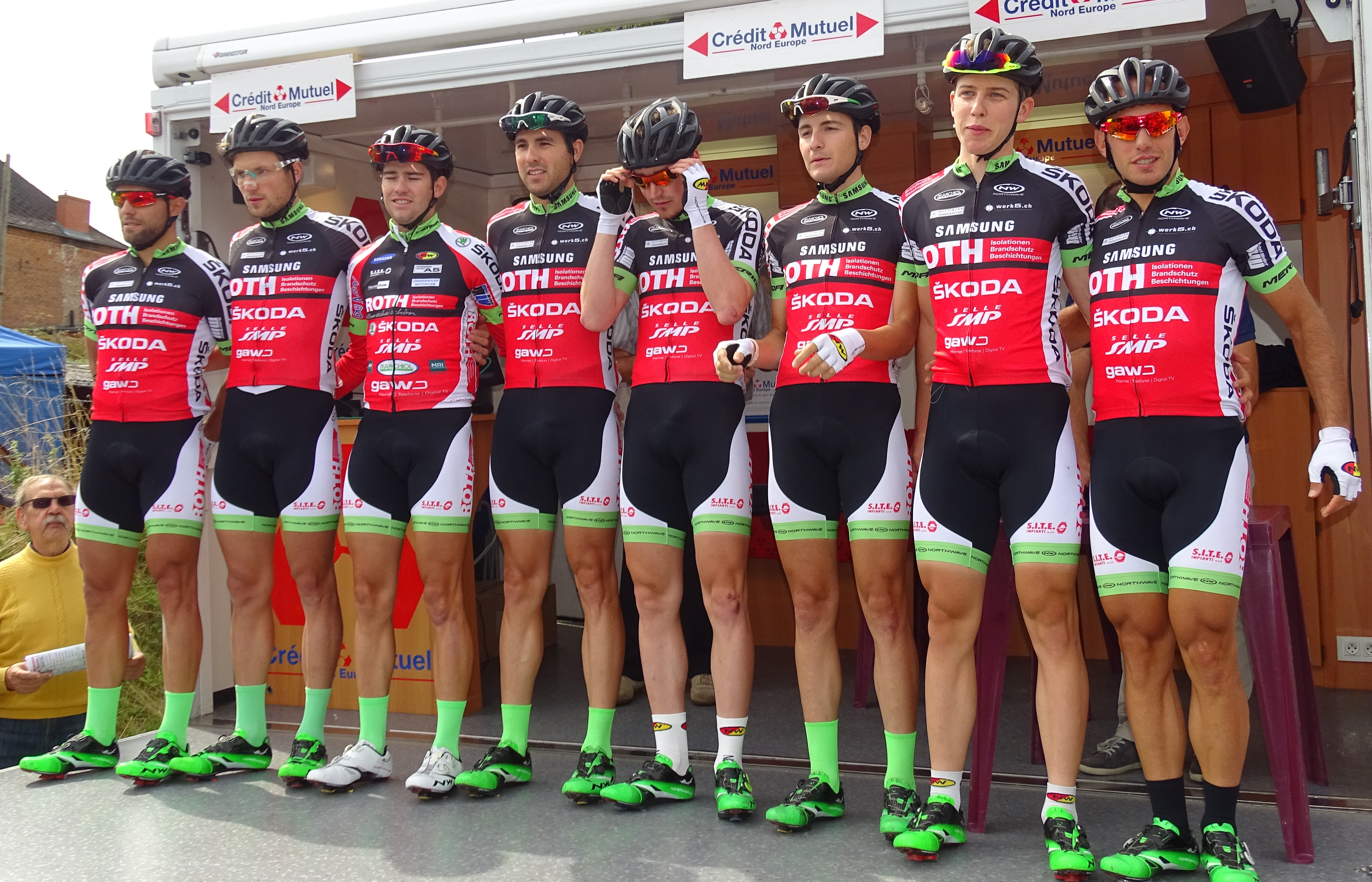

Team information
- UCI code: MAE (2014); ROT (2015–2016); TRA (2017); AKR (2018); AKT (2019); AET (2020–)
- Registered: Italy (2014); Switzerland (2015–)
- Founded: 2014
- Discipline: Road
- Status: UCI Professional Continental (2016); UCI Continental (2014–2015, 2017–)

Team name history
- 2014 2015 2016 2017 2018 2019 2020–: Marchiol Emisfero; Roth–Skoda; Team Roth; Roth–Akros; Akros–Renfer SA; Akros–Thömus; Akros–Excelsior–Thömus
Akros–Excelsior–Thömus jersey
Jersey

Akros–Excelsior–Thömus (UCI team code: AET) is a Swiss UCI Continental team founded in 2014. It participates in UCI Continental Circuits races, and held UCI Professional Continental for one year, in 2016.

== Team roster ==
As of 23 February 2020.

| Rider | Date of birth |
|---|---|
| Antoine Aebi (SUI) | 1 September 1998 (age 28) |
| Laurin Bachmann (SUI) | 24 August 1999 (age 27) |
| Matteo Bellia (ITA) | 1 September 1997 (age 29) |
| Rémi Capron (FRA) | 18 June 2000 (age 26) |
| Antoine Debons (SUI) | 17 February 1998 (age 28) |
| Thomas Devaux (FRA) | 29 January 1997 (age 29) |
| Loïs Dufaux (SUI) | 16 February 1998 (age 28) |

| Rider | Date of birth |
|---|---|
| Robin Froidevaux (SUI) | 17 October 1998 (age 27) |
| Jeremias Jenelten (SUI) | 11 May 1999 (age 27) |
| Scott Quincey (SUI) | 17 June 1999 (age 27) |
| Nico Selenati (SUI) | 30 July 1996 (age 30) |
| Valère Thiébaud (SUI) | 26 January 1999 (age 27) |
| Manuel Zobrist (SUI) | 8 March 1997 (age 29) |

== Major wins ==
2014
Trofeo Edil C, Andrea Vaccher
Overall Giro del Friuli-Venezia Giulia, Simone Antonini

Stage 1a, Team time trial

2015
Trofeo Alcide Degasperi, Alberto Cecchin
Stage 1 Boucles de la Mayenne, Andrea Pasqualon
Stage 2 Oberösterreich Rundfahrt, Andrea Pasqualon
Serbia U23 National Time Trial Championships, Miloš Borisavljevic
Stage 2 Ronde van Midden-Nederland, Alberto Cecchin
2019
Stage 1 Rhône-Alpes Isère Tour, Claudio Imhof
Stage 1 Sibiu Cycling Tour, Justin Paroz
