= 1962 Tour de Hongrie =

Race details
- Dates: 30 June – 8 July
- Stages: 9
- Distance: 1,393 km (865.6 mi)
- Winning time: 35h 22' 06"

Results
Jersey awarded to the overall winner	Winner	Adolf Christian (AUT)
	Second	János Juszkó (HUN)
	Third	Ferenc Horváth (HUN)
	Team	Dózsa I.

The 1962 Tour de Hongrie was the 18th edition of the Tour de Hongrie cycle race and was held from 30 June to 8 July 1962. The race started and finished in Budapest. The race was won by Adolf Christian.

== Route ==
Stages of the 1962 Tour de Hongrie
Stage	Date	Route	Distance	Type	Winner
1	30 June	Budapest to Győr	150 km (93 mi)	Plain stage	György Balaskó (HUN)
2	1 July	Győr to Szombathely	164 km (102 mi)	Plain stage	Arnold Ruiner (AUT)
3	2 July	Szombathely to Veszprém	186 km (116 mi)	Hilly stage	Antal Megyerdi (HUN)
4	3 July	Siófok to Pécs	165 km (103 mi)	Intermediate stage	Cristescu (ROU)
5	4 July	Pécs to Szekszárd	56 km (35 mi)	Individual time trial	Eberl (AUT)
6	5 July	Szekszárd to Szeged	136 km (85 mi)	Plain stage	András Mészáros (HUN)
7	6 July	Szeged to Debrecen	220 km (137 mi)	Plain stage	Adolf Christian (AUT)
8	7 July	Debrecen to Miskolc	136 km (85 mi)	Plain stage	Antal Megyerdi (HUN)
9	8 July	Miskolc to Budapest	188 km (117 mi)	Hilly stage	Antal Megyerdi (HUN)
Total			1,393 km (866 mi)		

== General classification ==
Final general classification

Rank	Rider	Team	Time
1	Adolf Christian (AUT)	Austria	35h 22' 06"
2	János Juszkó (HUN)	Vasas	+ 4' 02"
3	Ferenc Horváth (HUN)	BVSC	+ 4' 43"
