= 1937 Tour de Hongrie =

Race details
- Dates: 4–8 August
- Stages: 5
- Distance: 1,035 km (643.1 mi)
- Winning time: 33h 45' 23"

Results
	Winner	Anton Strakati (AUT)
	Second	Stanisław Wasilewski (POL)
	Third	Antal Szalay (HUN)
	Team	Hungary (national team)

The 1937 Tour de Hongrie was the 11th edition of the Tour de Hongrie cycle race and was held from 26 to 30 June 1937. The race started and finished in Budapest. The race was won by Anton Strakati.

== Route ==
Stages of the 1937 Tour de Hongrie
Stage	Date	Route	Distance	Winner
1	4 September	Budapest to Szeged	160 km (99 mi)	Józef Ignaczak (POL)
2	5 September	Szeged to Debrecen	223 km (139 mi)	István Liszkay (HUN)
3	6 September	Debrecen to Budapest	232 km (144 mi)	Zoltán Karaki (HUN)
4	7 September	Budapest to Keszthely	240 km (149 mi)	Bolesław Napierała (POL)
5	8 September	Keszthely to Budapest	180 km (112 mi)	Józef Ignaczak (POL)
Total			1,035 km (643 mi)	

== General classification ==
Final general classification

Rank	Rider	Team	Time
1	Anton Strakati (AUT)	Austria	33h 45' 23"
2	Stanisław Wasilewski (POL)	Poland	+ 1"
3	Antal Szalay (HUN)	Hungary	+ 5"
