= 1965 Tour de Hongrie =

Race details
- Dates: 6–10 July
- Stages: 6
- Distance: 908 km (564.2 mi)
- Winning time: 23h 01' 54"

Results
Jersey awarded to the overall winner	Winner	László Mahó (HUN)
	Second	György Balaskó (HUN)
	Third	János Juszkó (HUN)

The 1965 Tour de Hongrie was the 21st edition of the Tour de Hongrie cycle race and was held from 6 to 10 July 1965. The race started and finished in Budapest. The race was won by László Mahó.

== General classification ==
Final general classification

Rank	Rider	Team	Time
1	László Mahó (HUN)	Csepel SC	23h 01' 54"
2	György Balaskó (HUN)	Tipográfia	+ 58"
3	János Juszkó (HUN)	BVSC	+ 1' 19"
