= 1956 Tour de Hongrie =

Race details
- Dates: 29 July – 5 August 1956
- Stages: 7
- Distance: 1,257 km (781.1 mi)
- Winning time: 39h 08' 03"

Results
Jersey awarded to the overall winner	Winner	Győző Török (HUN)
	Second	Károlyi (HUN)
	Third	János Bende (HUN)
	Team	Honvéd

The 1956 Tour de Hongrie was the 17th edition of the Tour de Hongrie cycle race and was held from 29 July to 5 August 1956. The race started and finished in Budapest. The race was won by Győző Török.

== Route ==
Stages of the 1956 Tour de Hongrie
Stage	Date	Route	Distance	Type	Winner
1	29 July	Budapest to Szombathely	222 km (138 mi)	Plain stage	Lajos Aranyi (HUN)
2	30 July	Szombathely to Nagykanizsa	132 km (82 mi)	Plain stage	Márton Bencze (HUN)
3	31 July	Nagykanizsa to Pécs	199 km (124 mi)	Intermediate stage	Béla Bartusek (HUN)
4	1 August	Pécs to Szeged	194 km (121 mi)	Plain stage	János Bende (HUN)
	2 August	Szeged		Rest day	
5	3 August	Szeged to Debrecen	226 km (140 mi)	Plain stage	János Bende (HUN)
6	4 August	Debrecen to Miskolc	96 km (60 mi)	Individual time trial	Győző Török (HUN)
7	5 August	Miskolc to Budapest	188 km (117 mi)	Plain stage	János Bende (HUN)
Total			1,257 km (781 mi)		

== General classification ==
Final general classification

Rank	Rider	Team	Time
1	Győző Török (HUN)	Honvéd	39h 08' 03"
2	Károlyi (HUN)	Építők	+ 5' 54"
3	János Bende (HUN)	Szikra	+ 19' 13"
