= 1933 Tour de Hongrie =

Race details
- Dates: 28 June – 2 July
- Stages: 5
- Distance: 1,003 km (623.2 mi)
- Winning time: 36h 24' 22"

Results
	Winner	Kurt Stettler (SUI)
	Second	Hans Martin (SUI)
	Third	László Orczán (HUN)
	Team	Hungary A (national team)

The 1933 Tour de Hongrie was the eighth edition of the Tour de Hongrie cycle race and was held from 28 June to 2 July 1933. The race started and finished in Budapest. The race was won by Kurt Stettler.

== Route ==
Stages of the 1933 Tour de Hongrie
Stage	Date	Route	Distance	Winner
1	28 June	Budapest to Pécs	192 km (119 mi)	Kurt Stettler (SUI)
2	29 June	Pécs to Szombathely	249 km (155 mi)	Glauco Servadei (ITA)
3	30 June	Szombathely to Székesfehérvár	239 km (149 mi)	Glauco Servadei (ITA)
4	1 July	Székesfehérvár to Győr	198 km (123 mi)	Ernesto Merlini (ITA)
5	2 July	Győr to Budapest	125 km (78 mi)	René Durin (FRA)
Total			1,003 km (623 mi)	

== General classification ==
Final general classification

Rank	Rider	Team	Time
1	Kurt Stettler (SUI)	Switzerland	36h 24' 22"
2	Hans Martin (SUI)	Switzerland	+ 8' 17"
3	László Orczán (HUN)	Hungary A	+ 12' 20"
