= 1935 Tour de Hongrie =

Race details
- Dates: 26–30 June
- Stages: 5
- Distance: 1,037 km (644.4 mi)
- Winning time: 40h 26' 37"

Results
	Winner	Károly Németh (HUN)
	Second	Ferenc Éles (HUN)
	Third	István Adorján (HUN)
	Team	BSE

The 1935 Tour de Hongrie was the 10th edition of the Tour de Hongrie cycle race and was held from 26 to 30 June 1935. The race started and finished in Budapest. The race was won by Károly Németh.

== Route ==
Stages of the 1935 Tour de Hongrie
Stage	Date	Route	Distance	Winner
1	26 June	Budapest to Eger	174 km (108 mi)	Károly Németh (HUN)
2	27 June	Eger to Békéscsaba	240 km (149 mi)	Károly Németh (HUN)
3	28 June	Békéscsaba to Budapest	213 km (132 mi)	Károly Németh (HUN)
4	29 June	Budapest to Kaposvár	220 km (137 mi)	Károly Németh (HUN)
5	30 June	Kaposvár to Budapest	190 km (118 mi)	István Liszkay (HUN)
Total			1,037 km (644 mi)	

== General classification ==
Final general classification

Rank	Rider	Team	Time
1	Károly Németh (HUN)	BSE	40h 26' 37"
2	Ferenc Éles (HUN)	Hungary (national team)	+ 9' 51"
3	István Adorján (HUN)	Székesfehérvári MÁV Előre	+ 10' 47"
