= 1942 Tour de Hongrie =

Race details
- Dates: 27–29 June
- Stages: 3
- Distance: 580 km (360.4 mi)
- Winning time: 18h 23' 29"

Results
	Winner	Ferenc Barvik (HUN)
	Second	Gyula Gere (HUN)
	Third	Mihály Irházi (HUN)
	Team	Postás

The 1942 Tour de Hongrie was the 12th edition of the Tour de Hongrie cycle race and was held from 27 to 29 June 1942. The race started in Budapest and finished in Nagyvárad. The race was won by Ferenc Barvik.

== Route ==
Stages of the 1942 Tour de Hongrie
Stage	Date	Route	Distance	Winner
1	27 June	Budapest to Nagyvárad	280 km (174 mi)	Károly Nótás (HUN)
2	28 June	Nagyvárad to Kolozsvár	150 km (93 mi)	István Liszkay (HUN)
3	29 June	Kolozsvár to Nagyvárad	150 km (93 mi)	János Gyurkovits (HUN)
Total			580 km (360 mi)	

== General classification ==
Final general classification

Rank	Rider	Team	Time
1	Ferenc Barvik (HUN)	FTC	18h 23' 29"
2	Gyula Gere (HUN)	Postás	+ 3' 02"
3	Mihály Irházi (HUN)	SKE	+ 5' 09"
