= Tour de Hongrie =

Cycling competition

- 2026 Tour de Hongrie

Race details
- Date: May (2021–)
- Region: Hungary
- English name: Tour of Hungary
- Local name: Magyar Kerékpáros Körverseny (in Hungarian)
- Nickname: TdH
- Discipline: Road
- Competition: UCI Europe Tour (2015–2022); UCI ProSeries (2023–present)
- Type: Stage race
- Organiser: Vuelta Kft. (with authorization of the Hungarian Cycling Federation)
- Race director: László Szilasi (race director); Károly Eisenkrammer (general director)
- Web site: tdh.hu

History
- First edition: 27 June 1925; 100 years ago
- Editions: 47 (as of 2026)
- First winner: Károly Jerzsabek (HUN)
- Most wins: László Vida (HUN); István Liszkai (HUN); Győző Török (HUN); Zoltán Remák (SVK) (2 wins each)
- Most recent: Jakob Söderqvist (SWE)

The Tour de Hongrie (English: Tour of Hungary) is a professional road bicycle stage race organized in Hungary since 1925.

== History ==
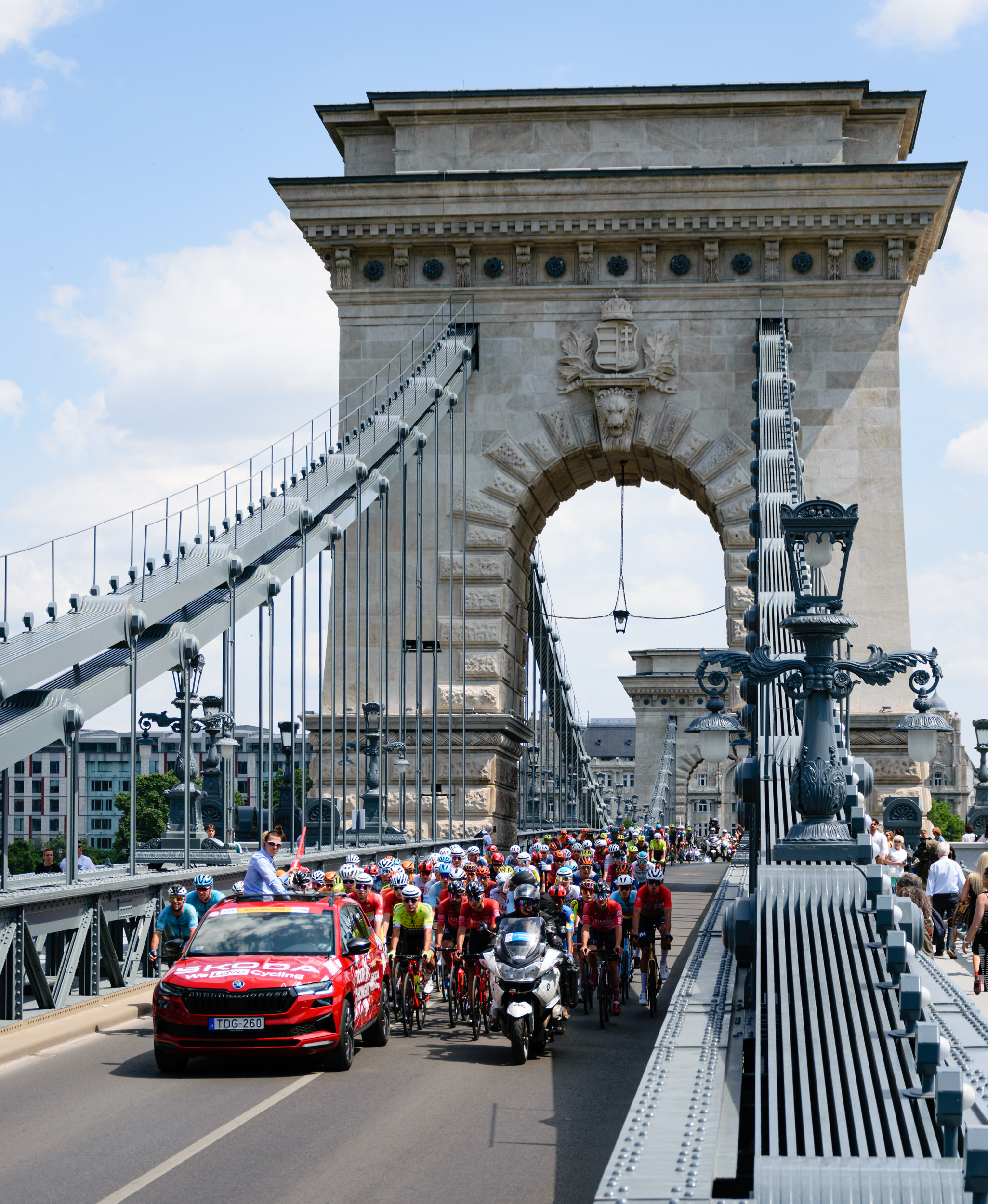
Riders behind the pace car of race director László Szilasi on Stage 4 of the 2024 Tour de Hongrie, crossing the Széchenyi Chain Bridge in Budapest, Hungary

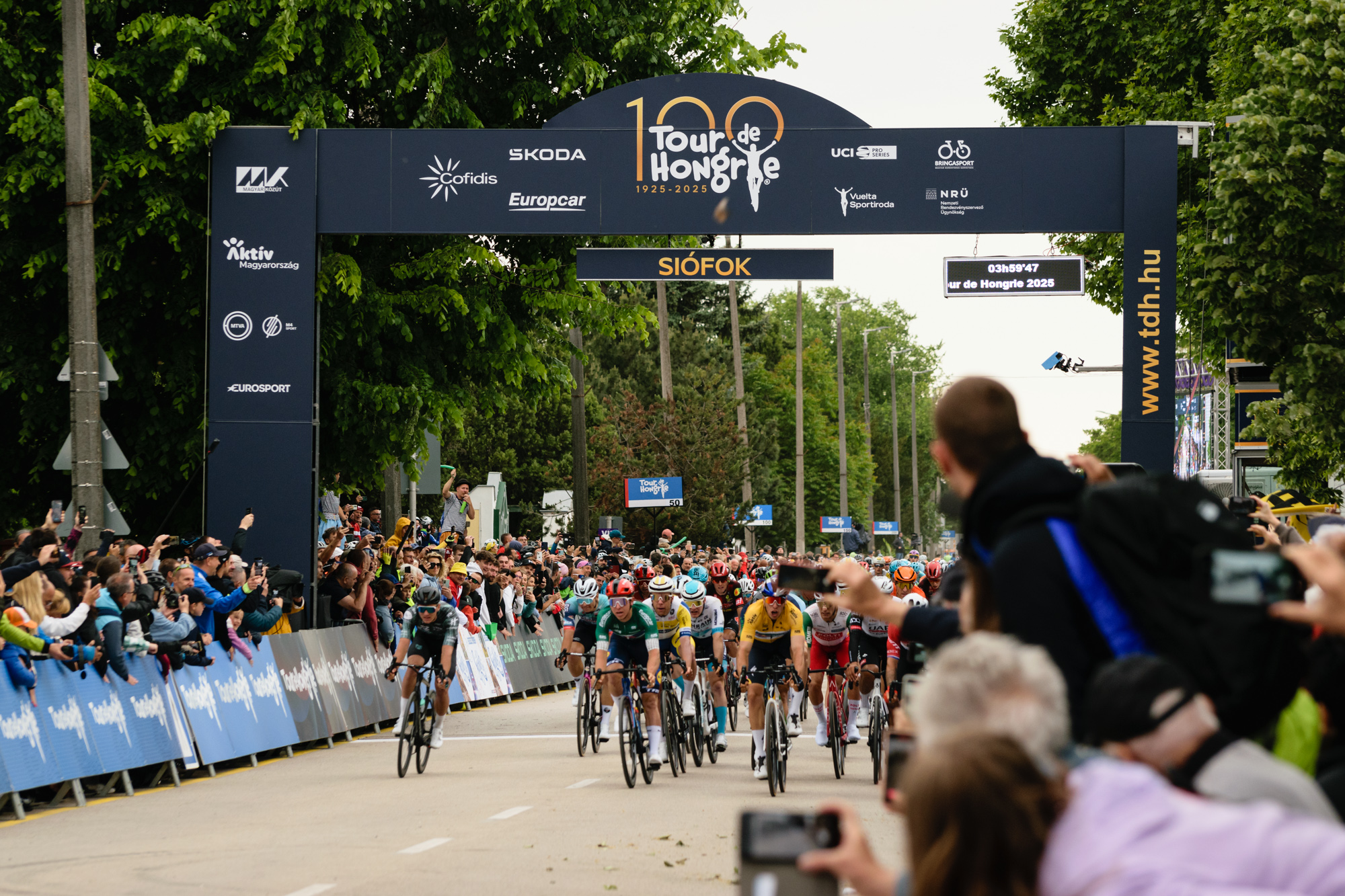
Finish of Stage 2 of the 2025 Tour de Hongrie in Siófok, Hungary

The inaugural Tour de Hongrie took place on 27 June 1925. The cyclists hit the road as early as four in the morning, and the Budapest–Szombathely–Győr-Budapest stage was accomplished the quickest by Károly Jerzsabek, who covered the distance of 510.5 kilometres in 22 hours and 10 minutes to become the first ever champion of the event.

The race was held every year until World War II, except in 1928 when Budapest hosted the UCI Road World Championship and 1936 when cyclists were in the middle of the preparation for the Olympic Games. During the World War, the event was held twice on a shortened distance; however, following the political changes in the country it was staged only occasionally. Moreover, no competitions were held between 1964 and 1992.

After the fall of communism in Hungary, the Tour the Hongrie was organized again by the Hungarian Cycling Federation in 1993, and was held until 2008 with only shorter interruptions. In 2007, the field of the tour left the actual borders of the country for the first time, when the third stage of the race began in Sátoraljaújhely and ended in Košice, Slovakia. Up to the present, the 2008 edition was the last fixture of the event, after that the Hungarian stages have been integrated to another competition, the Central European Tour. It was then incorporated into the UCI ProSeries from 2023. In 2025, Tour de Hongrie joined the AIOCC (Association Internationale des Organisateurs de Courses Cyclistes).

== Winners ==
Year	Country	Rider	Team
1925	Hungary	Károly Jerzsabek	MTK
1926	Hungary	László Vida	BTC
1927	Hungary	László Vida	BTC
1928	No race due to 1928 UCI Road World Championships		
1929	Germany	Oscar Tirbach	Germany (national team)
1930	Italy	Vasco Bergamaschi	Italy (national team)
1931	Hungary	István Liszkai	BSE
1932	Hungary	József Vitéz	Nyomdász TE
1933	Switzerland	Kurt Stettler	Switzerland (national team)
1934	Hungary	Károly Szenes	MTK
1935	Hungary	Károly Németh	BSE
1936	No race due to 1936 Summer Olympics		
1937	Austria	Anton Strakati	Austria (national team)
1938–1941	No race		
1942	Hungary	Ferenc Barvik	FTC
1943	Hungary	István Liszkai	Törekvés
1944–1948	No race		
1949	France	André Labeylie	France (national team)
1950–1952	No race		
1953	Hungary	József Kis-Dala	Újpesti Dózsa
1954	No race		
1955	Hungary	Győző Török	Bp. Honvéd
1956	Hungary	Győző Török	Bp. Honvéd
1957–1961	No race		
1962	Austria	Adolf Christian	Austria (national team)
1963	Hungary	András Mészáros	Újpesti Dózsa
1964	Hungary	Ferenc Stámusz	Újpesti Dózsa
1965	Hungary	László Mahó	Csepel SC
1966–1992	No race		
1993	Germany	Jens Dittmann	Thüringia
1994	Austria	Wolfgang Kotzmann	
1995	Russia	Sergei Ivanov	Lada-Samara
1996	Ukraine	Andrej Tolomanov	
1997	Hungary	Zoltán Bebtó	Stollwerck–FTC
1998	Ukraine	Aleksandr Rotar	Torov Kir
1999–2000	No race		
2001	Yugoslavia	Mikoš Rnjaković	Spartak Subotica
2002	Hungary	Zoltán Vanik	Postás-Matáv
2003	Slovakia	Zoltán Remák	P Nívó-Betonexpressz-FTC
2004	Slovakia	Zoltán Remák	Podbrezová
2005	Hungary	Tamás Lengyel	P-Nívó-Betonexpressz
2006	Slovakia	Martin Riška	PSK Whirlpool–Hradec Krlove
2007	Austria	Andrew Bradley	Team Swiag
2008	Netherlands	Hans Bloks	Cycling Team Jo Piels
2009–2014	No race		
2015	Luxembourg	Tom Thill	Differdange–Losch
2016	Estonia	Mihkel Räim	Cycling Academy
2017	Colombia	Daniel Jaramillo	UnitedHealthcare
2018	Italy	Manuel Belletti	Androni Giocattoli–Sidermec
2019	Latvia	Krists Neilands	Israel Cycling Academy
2020	Hungary	Attila Valter	CCC Team
2021	Australia	Damien Howson	Team BikeExchange
2022	Ireland	Eddie Dunbar	INEOS Grenadiers
2023	Switzerland	Marc Hirschi	UAE Team Emirates
2024	Belgium	Thibau Nys	Lidl–Trek
2025	Ecuador	Harold Martín López	XDS Astana Team
2026	Sweden	Jakob Söderqvist	Lidl–Trek

=== Winners by nation ===
A complete list over overall winners by nation of the Tour de Hongrie.

Rank	Country	Most times winner	Most recent winner	Wins
1	Hungary	László Vida, István Liszkai, Győző Török (2 each)	Attila Valter (2020)	19
2	Austria	Anton Strakati, Adolf Christian, Wolfgang Kotzmann, Andrew Bradley (1 each)	Andrew Bradley (2007)	4
3	Slovakia	Zoltán Remák (2)	Martin Riška (2006)	3
4	Germany	Oscar Tirbach, Jens Dittmann (1 each)	Jens Dittmann (1993)	2
4	Italy	Vasco Bergamaschi, Manuel Belletti (1 each)	Manuel Belletti (2018)	2
4	Switzerland	Kurt Stettler, Marc Hirschi (1 each)	Marc Hirschi (2023)	2
4	Ukraine	Andrej Tolomanov, Aleksandr Rotar (1 each)	Aleksandr Rotar (1998)	2
8	Australia	Damien Howson (1)	Damien Howson (2021)	1
8	Belgium	Thibau Nys (1)	Thibau Nys (2024)	1
8	Colombia	Daniel Jaramillo (1)	Daniel Jaramillo (2017)	1
8	Ecuador	Harold Martín López (1)	Harold Martín López (2025)	1
8	Estonia	Mihkel Räim (1)	Mihkel Räim (2016)	1
8	France	André Labeylie (1)	André Labeylie (1949)	1
8	Ireland	Eddie Dunbar (1)	Eddie Dunbar (2022)	1
8	Latvia	Krists Neilands (1)	Krists Neilands (2019)	1
8	Luxembourg	Tom Thill (1)	Tom Thill (2015)	1
8	Netherlands	Hans Bloks (1)	Hans Bloks (2008)	1
8	Russia	Sergei Ivanov (1)	Sergei Ivanov (1995)	1
8	Sweden	Jakob Söderqvist (1)	Jakob Söderqvist (2026)	1
8	(Federal Republic of Yugoslavia) FR Yugoslavia	Mikoš Rnjaković (1)	Mikoš Rnjaković (2001)	1

== Classifications ==
As of the 2018 edition, the jerseys worn by the leaders of the individual classifications are:

- Yellow Jersey – Worn by the leader of the general classification.
- Green Jersey – Worn by the leader of the points classification.
- Red Jersey – Worn by the leader of the climbing classification.
- White Jersey – Worn by the best Hungarian rider of the overall classification.
