= 1943 Tour de Hongrie =

Race details
- Dates: 24–25 June
- Stages: 2 (Note: Initially scheduled for a three road stages over 471 kilometres (293 miles), but the last stage was cancelled.)
- Distance: 406 km (252.3 mi)
- Winning time: 14h 44' 09"

Results
	Winner	Isván Liszkay (HUN)
	Second	Gyula Gere (HUN)
	Third	Lakatos (HUN)
	Team	Törekvés

The 1943 Tour de Hongrie was the 13th edition of the Tour de Hongrie cycle race and was held from 24 to 26 June 1943. The race started in Budapest and finished in Kolozsvár. The race was won by István Liszkay.

== Route ==
Stages of the 1943 Tour de Hongrie
Stage	Date	Route	Distance	Winner
1	24 June	Budapest to Nagyvárad	255 km (158 mi)	Ferenc Kiss (HUN)
2	25 June	Nagyvárad to Kolozsvár	151 km (94 mi)	Gyula Gere (HUN)
3	26 June	Kolozsvár	65 km (40 mi)	Stage cancelled
Total			471 km (293 mi)	

== General classification ==
Final general classification

Rank	Rider	Team	Time
1	István Liszkay (HUN)	Törekvés	14h 44' 09"
2	Gyula Gere (HUN)	Postás	+ 2"
3	Lakatos (HUN)	Törekvés	+ 2"
