= 1998 Tour de Hongrie =

Race details
- Dates: 23–30 August
- Stages: 7 + Prologue
- Distance: 1,078.5 km (670.1 mi)
- Winning time: 27h 16' 24"

Results
Jersey awarded to the overall winner	Winner	Aleksandr Rotar (UKR)	(Torov Kir)
	Second	Nazarenko (UKR)	(Torov Kir)
	Third	Károly Eisenkrammer (HUN)	(Postás-Matáv)
Jersey awarded to the points classification winner	Points	Yuriy Krivtsov (UKR)	(Torov Kir)
Jersey awarded to the mountains classification winner	Mountains	Aleksandr Rotar (UKR)	(Torov Kir)
	Team	Torov Kir	

The 1998 Tour de Hongrie was the 27th edition of the Tour de Hongrie cycle race and was held from 23 to 30 August 1998. The race started and finished in Budapest. The race was won by Aleksandr Rotar.

== General classification ==
Final general classification

Rank	Rider	Team	Time
1	Aleksandr Rotar (UKR)	Torov Kir	27h 16' 24"
2	Nazarenko (UKR)	Torov Kir	+ 51"
3	Károly Eisenkrammer (HUN)	Postás-Matáv	+ 1' 25"
