= 1934 Tour de Hongrie =

Race details
- Dates: 26–30 June
- Stages: 5
- Distance: 975 km (605.8 mi)
- Winning time: 33h 15' 41"

Results
	Winner	Károly Szenes (HUN)
	Second	István Liszkay (HUN)
	Third	Béla Mádl (HUN)
	Team	Hungary A (national team)

The 1934 Tour de Hongrie was the ninth edition of the Tour de Hongrie cycle race and was held from 26 to 30 June 1934. The race started and finished in Budapest. The race was won by Károly Szenes.

== Route ==
Stages of the 1934 Tour de Hongrie
Stage	Date	Route	Distance	Winner
1	26 June	Budapest to Miskolc	191 km (119 mi)	Zehnalek (AUT)
2	27 June	Miskolc to Debrecen	137 km (85 mi)	Károly Szenes (HUN)
3	28 June	Debrecen to Budapest	215 km (134 mi)	Zehnalek (AUT)
4	29 June	Budapest to Tapolca	227 km (141 mi)	Károly Németh (HUN)
5	30 June	Tapolca to Budapest	205 km (127 mi)	János Gyurkovits (HUN)
Total			975 km (606 mi)	

== General classification ==
Final general classification

Rank	Rider	Team	Time
1	Károly Szenes (HUN)	MTK	33h 15' 41"
2	István Liszkay (HUN)	Hungary A	+ 1' 25"
3	Béla Mádl (HUN)	UTE	+ 2' 04"
