= 1932 Tour de Hongrie =

Race details
- Dates: 29 June – 3 July
- Stages: 5
- Distance: 1,030.5 km (640.3 mi)
- Winning time: 38h 01' 41"

Results
	Winner	József Vitéz (HUN)
	Second	István Nemess (HUN)
	Third	Livio Carlotti (ITA)
	Team	Hungary B (national team)

The 1932 Tour de Hongrie was the seventh edition of the Tour de Hongrie cycle race and was held from 29 June to 3 July 1932. The race started and finished in Budapest. The race was won by József Vitéz.

== Route ==
Stages of the 1932 Tour de Hongrie
Stage	Date	Route	Distance	Winner
1	29 June	Budapest to Szolnok	198 km (123 mi)	Sebastian Krückl (GER)
2	30 June	Szolnok to Miskolc	207.5 km (129 mi)	Imre Simon (HUN)
3	1 July	Miskolc to Debrecen	235.5 km (146 mi)	Antonio Andretta (ITA)
4	2 July	Debrecen to Hódmezővásárhely	203.5 km (126 mi)	István Nemes (HUN)
5	3 July	Hódmezővásárhely to Budapest	186 km (116 mi)	Antonio Andretta (ITA)
Total			1,030.5 km (640 mi)	

== General classification ==
Final general classification

Rank	Rider	Team	Time
1	József Vitéz (HUN)	Nyomdász TE	38h 01' 41"
2	István Nemes (HUN)	Postás	+ 1' 05"
3	Lino Carlotti (ITA)	Italy	+ 6' 58"
