= 1949 Tour de Hongrie =

Race details
- Dates: 29 June – 3 July
- Stages: 5
- Distance: 1,036 km (643.7 mi)
- Winning time: 31h 23' 33"

Results
	Winner	André Labeylie (FRA)
	Second	Rudolf Lauscha (AUT)
	Third	Roger Bourgeteau (FRA)
	Team	France (national team)

The 1949 Tour de Hongrie was the 14th edition of the Tour de Hongrie cycle race and was held from 29 June to 3 July 1949. The race started and finished in Budapest. The race was won by André Labeylie.

== Route ==
Stages of the 1949 Tour de Hongrie
Stage	Date	Route	Distance	Winner
1	29 June	Budapest to Debrecen	229 km (142 mi)	Varnayo (FRA)
2	30 June	Debrecen to Miskolc	231 km (144 mi)	Sandru (ROU)
3	1 July	Miskolc to Budapest	184 km (114 mi)	Roger Bourgeteau (FRA)
4	2 July	Budapest to Keszthely	192 km (119 mi)	André Labeylie (FRA)
5	3 July	Keszthely to Budapest	200 km (124 mi)	Varnayo (FRA)
Total			1,036 km (644 mi)	

== General classification ==
Final general classification

Rank	Rider	Team	Time
1	André Labeylie (FRA)	France	31h 23' 33"
2	Rudolf Lauscha (AUT)	Austria	+ 10' 01"
3	Roger Bourgeteau (FRA)	France	+ 15' 02"
