= 2022 Tour de Hongrie =

2022 UCI Europe Tour

Race details
- Dates: 11–15 May 2022
- Stages: 5
- Distance: 905 km (562 mi)
- Winning time: 20h 38' 43"

Results
Jersey awarded to the overall winner	Winner	Eddie Dunbar (IRL)	(INEOS Grenadiers)
	Second	Óscar Rodríguez (ESP)	(Movistar Team)
	Third	Samuele Battistella (ITA)	(Astana Qazaqstan Team)
Jersey awarded to the points classification winner	Points	Fabio Jakobsen (NED)	(Quick-Step Alpha Vinyl Team)
Jersey awarded to the mountains classification winner	Mountains	Aaron Van Poucke (BEL)	(Sport Vlaanderen–Baloise)
	Team	Trek–Segafredo	

The 2022 Tour de Hongrie was the 43rd edition of the Tour de Hongrie, which took place between 11 and 15 May 2022. It was the eighth edition since the race's revival in 2015, and was rated as a 2.1 event as part of the 2022 UCI Europe Tour.

== Teams ==
Eleven UCI WorldTeams, eight UCI ProTeams, two UCI Continental teams, and the Hungarian national team made up the twenty-three teams that participated in the race, with six riders each. With five riders, INEOS Grenadiers is the only team to not field a maximum roster of six riders.

UCI WorldTeams

- Astana Qazaqstan Team
- Bora–Hansgrohe
- INEOS Grenadiers
- Israel–Premier Tech
- Movistar Team
- Quick-Step Alpha Vinyl Team
- Team Bahrain Victorious
- Team BikeExchange–Jayco
- Team DSM
- Team Jumbo–Visma
- Trek–Segafredo

UCI ProTeams

- Caja Rural–Seguros RGA
- Drone Hopper–Androni Giocattoli
- Eolo–Kometa
- Human Powered Health
- Sport Vlaanderen–Baloise
- Team Novo Nordisk
- Uno-X Pro Cycling Team
- Alpecin–Fenix

UCI ContinentalTeams

- Adria Mobil
- Giotti Victoria–Savini Due

National Team

- Hungary

== Route ==
Stage characteristics and winners
Stage	Date	Route	Distance	Type	Winner
1	11 May	Csákvár to Székesfehérvár	198 km (123 mi)	Hilly stage	Olav Kooij (NED)
2	12 May	Karcag to Hajdúszoboszló	192 km (119 mi)	Flat stage	Fabio Jakobsen (NED)
3	13 May	Sárospatak to Nyíregyháza	154 km (96 mi)	Flat stage	Fabio Jakobsen (NED)
4	14 May	Kazincbarcika to Kazincbarcika	177 km (110 mi)	Hilly stage	Dylan Groenewegen (NED)
5	15 May	Miskolc to Gyöngyös (Kékestető)	184 km (114 mi)	Intermediate stage	Antonio Tiberi (ITA)
Total		905 km (562 mi)			

== Stages ==
=== Stage 1 ===
11 May 2022 — Csákvár to Székesfehérvár, 198 km (123 mi)

Stage 1 Result (1–10)
Rank	Rider	Team	Time
1	Olav Kooij (NED)	Team Jumbo–Visma	4h 34' 46"
2	Elia Viviani (ITA)	INEOS Grenadiers	+ 0"
3	Matt Walls (GBR)	Bora–Hansgrohe	+ 0"
4	Rudy Barbier (FRA)	Israel–Premier Tech	+ 0"
5	Matteo Moschetti (ITA)	Trek–Segafredo	+ 0"
6	Max Kanter (GER)	Movistar Team	+ 0"
7	Dylan Groenewegen (NED)	Team BikeExchange–Jayco	+ 0"
8	Sasha Weemaes (BEL)	Sport Vlaanderen–Baloise	+ 0"
9	Marius Mayrhofer (GER)	Team DSM	+ 0"
10	Arvid de Kleijn (NED)	Human Powered Health	+ 0"

General classification after Stage 1 (1–10)
Rank	Rider	Team	Time
1	Olav Kooij (NED)	Team Jumbo–Visma	4h 34' 36"
2	Jens Reynders (BEL)	Sport Vlaanderen–Baloise	+ 2"
3	Elia Viviani (ITA)	INEOS Grenadiers	+ 4"
4	Matt Walls (GBR)	Bora–Hansgrohe	+ 6"
5	Márton Dina (HUN)	Eolo–Kometa	+ 6"
6	Viktor Filutás (HUN)	Adria Mobil	+ 7"
7	Joey Rosskopf (USA)	Human Powered Health	+ 8"
8	Aaron Van Poucke (BEL)	Sport Vlaanderen–Baloise	+ 9"
9	Rudy Barbier (FRA)	Israel–Premier Tech	+ 10"
10	Matteo Moschetti (ITA)	Trek–Segafredo	+ 10"

=== Stage 2 ===
12 May 2022 — Karcag to Hajdúszoboszló, 192 km (119 mi)

Stage 2 Result (1–10)
Rank	Rider	Team	Time
1	Fabio Jakobsen (NED)	Quick-Step Alpha Vinyl Team	3h 59' 20"
2	Rudy Barbier (FRA)	Israel–Premier Tech	+ 0"
3	Sasha Weemaes (BEL)	Sport Vlaanderen–Baloise	+ 0"
4	Itamar Einhorn (ISR)	Israel–Premier Tech	+ 0"
5	Max Kanter (GER)	Movistar Team	+ 0"
6	Matteo Moschetti (ITA)	Trek–Segafredo	+ 0"
7	Simon Dehairs (BEL)	Alpecin–Fenix	+ 0"
8	Marius Mayrhofer (GER)	Team DSM	+ 0"
9	Tom Van Asbroeck (BEL)	Israel–Premier Tech	+ 0"
10	Patrick Konrad (AUT)	Bora–Hansgrohe	+ 0"

General classification after Stage 2 (1–10)
Rank	Rider	Team	Time
1	Jens Reynders (BEL)	Sport Vlaanderen–Baloise	8h 33' 52"
2	Fabio Jakobsen (NED)	Quick-Step Alpha Vinyl Team	+ 4"
3	Olav Kooij (NED)	Team Jumbo–Visma	+ 4"
4	Elia Viviani (ITA)	INEOS Grenadiers	+ 5"
5	Rudy Barbier (FRA)	Israel–Premier Tech	+ 8"
6	Sasha Weemaes (BEL)	Sport Vlaanderen–Baloise	+ 10"
7	Matt Walls (GBR)	Bora–Hansgrohe	+ 10"
8	Filippo Baroncini (ITA)	Trek–Segafredo	+ 10"
9	Márton Dina (HUN)	Eolo–Kometa	+ 10"
10	Joey Rosskopf (USA)	Human Powered Health	+ 12"

=== Stage 3 ===
13 May 2022 — Sárospatak to Nyíregyháza, 154 km (96 mi)

Stage 3 Result (1–10)
Rank	Rider	Team	Time
1	Fabio Jakobsen (NED)	Quick-Step Alpha Vinyl Team	3h 25' 55"
2	Rudy Barbier (FRA)	Israel–Premier Tech	+ 0"
3	Sasha Weemaes (BEL)	Sport Vlaanderen–Baloise	+ 0"
4	David Dekker (NED)	Team Jumbo–Visma	+ 0"
5	Max Kanter (GER)	Movistar Team	+ 0"
6	Matt Walls (GBR)	Bora–Hansgrohe	+ 0"
7	Simon Dehairs (BEL)	Alpecin–Fenix	+ 0"
8	Marius Mayrhofer (GER)	Team DSM	+ 0"
9	Iúri Leitão (POR)	Caja Rural–Seguros RGA	+ 0"
10	David Martín (ESP)	Eolo–Kometa	+ 0"

General classification after Stage 3 (1–10)
Rank	Rider	Team	Time
1	Fabio Jakobsen (NED)	Quick-Step Alpha Vinyl Team	11h 59' 41"
2	Jens Reynders (BEL)	Sport Vlaanderen–Baloise	+ 6"
3	Rudy Barbier (FRA)	Israel–Premier Tech	+ 8"
4	Elia Viviani (ITA)	INEOS Grenadiers	+ 11"
5	Sasha Weemaes (BEL)	Sport Vlaanderen–Baloise	+ 12"
6	Matt Walls (GBR)	Bora–Hansgrohe	+ 16"
7	Filippo Baroncini (ITA)	Trek–Segafredo	+ 16"
8	Márton Dina (HUN)	Eolo–Kometa	+ 16"
9	Krists Neilands (LAT)	Israel–Premier Tech	+ 18"
10	Joey Rosskopf (USA)	Human Powered Health	+ 18"

=== Stage 4 ===
14 May 2022 — Kazincbarcika to Kazincbarcika, 177 km (110 mi)

Stage 4 Result (1–10)
Rank	Rider	Team	Time
1	Dylan Groenewegen (NED)	Team BikeExchange–Jayco	3h 59' 15"
2	Fabio Jakobsen (NED)	Quick-Step Alpha Vinyl Team	+ 0"
3	Rudy Barbier (FRA)	Israel–Premier Tech	+ 0"
4	Sasha Weemaes (BEL)	Sport Vlaanderen–Baloise	+ 0"
5	Elia Viviani (ITA)	INEOS Grenadiers	+ 0"
6	Timo Kielich (BEL)	Alpecin–Fenix	+ 0"
7	Max Kanter (GER)	Movistar Team	+ 0"
8	Henri Uhlig (GER)	Alpecin–Fenix	+ 0"
9	David Dekker (NED)	Team Jumbo–Visma	+ 0"
10	Itamar Einhorn (ISR)	Israel–Premier Tech	+ 0"

General classification after Stage 4 (1–10)
Rank	Rider	Team	Time
1	Fabio Jakobsen (NED)	Quick-Step Alpha Vinyl Team	15h 58' 50"
2	Rudy Barbier (FRA)	Israel–Premier Tech	+ 10"
3	Jens Reynders (BEL)	Sport Vlaanderen–Baloise	+ 12"
4	Dylan Groenewegen (NED)	Team BikeExchange–Jayco	+ 16"
5	Elia Viviani (ITA)	INEOS Grenadiers	+ 17"
6	Toon Vandebosch (BEL)	Alpecin–Fenix	+ 17"
7	Sasha Weemaes (BEL)	Sport Vlaanderen–Baloise	+ 18"
8	Matt Walls (GBR)	Bora–Hansgrohe	+ 22"
9	Filippo Baroncini (ITA)	Trek–Segafredo	+ 22"
10	Márton Dina (HUN)	Eolo–Kometa	+ 22"

=== Stage 5 ===
15 May 2022 — Miskolc to Gyöngyös-Kékestető, 184 km (114 mi)

Stage 5 Result (1–10)
Rank	Rider	Team	Time
1	Antonio Tiberi (ITA)	Trek–Segafredo	4h 39' 31"
2	Eddie Dunbar (IRL)	INEOS Grenadiers	+ 2"
3	Óscar Rodríguez (ESP)	Movistar Team	+ 23"
4	Samuele Battistella (ITA)	Astana Qazaqstan Team	+ 25"
5	Edoardo Zambanini (ITA)	Team Bahrain Victorious	+ 25"
6	Carl Fredrik Hagen (NOR)	Israel–Premier Tech	+ 31"
7	Niklas Eg (DEN)	Uno-X Pro Cycling Team	+ 32"
8	Krists Neilands (LVA)	Israel–Premier Tech	+ 41"
9	Patrick Konrad (AUT)	Bora–Hansgrohe	+ 48"
10	Anthon Charmig (DEN)	Uno-X Pro Cycling Team	+ 55"

General classification after Stage 5 (1–10)
Rank	Rider	Team	Time
1	Eddie Dunbar (IRL)	INEOS Grenadiers	20h 38' 43"
2	Óscar Rodríguez (ESP)	Movistar Team	+ 23"
3	Samuele Battistella (ITA)	Astana Qazaqstan Team	+ 28"
4	Edoardo Zambanini (ITA)	Team Bahrain Victorious	+ 29"
5	Carl Fredrik Hagen (NOR)	Israel–Premier Tech	+ 35"
6	Niklas Eg (DEN)	Uno-X Pro Cycling Team	+ 36"
7	Krists Neilands (LVA)	Israel–Premier Tech	+ 43"
8	Patrick Konrad (AUT)	Bora–Hansgrohe	+ 50"
9	Anthon Charmig (DEN)	Uno-X Pro Cycling Team	+ 59"
10	Kamiel Bonneu (BEL)	Sport Vlaanderen–Baloise	+ 1' 01"

== Classification leadership table ==
Points for the points classification
Type	1	2	3	4	5	6	7	8	9	10
Stage finishes	15	12	10	8	6	5	4	3	2	1
Intermediate sprint	5	3	1	0						

Points for the mountains classification
Type	1	2	3	4	5	6	7
Points for Category	10	7	5	4	3	2	1
Points for Category	6	4	2	1	0		
Points for Category	5	3	1	0			

In the 2022 Tour de Hongrie, four jerseys are awarded. The general classification is calculated by adding each cyclist's finishing times on each stage. The leader of the general classification receives a yellow jersey, sponsored by the Hungarian Tourism Agency (Aktív Magyarország), and the winner of this classification is considered the winner of the race.

The second classification is the points classification. Riders are awarded points for finishing in the top fifteen of each stage. Points are also on offer at intermediate sprints. The leader of the points classification wears a green jersey, sponsored by Škoda and Europcar.

There is also a mountains classification for which points are awarded for reaching the top of a climb before other riders. The climbs are categorized, in order of increasing difficulty, as third, second, and first-category. The leader of the mountains classification wears a red jersey, sponsored by Cofidis.

The fourth jersey is a classification for Hungarian riders, marked by a white jersey sponsored by the Hungarian Public Road Company (Magyar Közút) and the Hungarian Cycling Federation (Bringasport). Only Hungarian riders are eligible and they are ranked according to their placement in the general classification of the race.

The final classification is the team classification, for which the times of the best three cyclists in each team on each stage are added together; the leading team at the end of the race is the team with the lowest cumulative time.

Classification leadership by stage
Stage	Winner	General classification	Points classification	Mountains classification	Hungarian rider classification	Team classification
1	Olav Kooij	Olav Kooij	Olav Kooij	Aaron Van Poucke	Márton Dina	INEOS Grenadiers
2	Fabio Jakobsen	Jens Reynders	Jens Reynders	Aaron Van Poucke	Márton Dina	Israel–Premier Tech
3	Fabio Jakobsen	Fabio Jakobsen	Rudy Barbier	Aaron Van Poucke	Márton Dina	Israel–Premier Tech
4	Dylan Groenewegen	Fabio Jakobsen	Fabio Jakobsen	Aaron Van Poucke	Márton Dina	Israel–Premier Tech
5	Antonio Tiberi	Eddie Dunbar	Fabio Jakobsen	Aaron Van Poucke	Márton Dina	Trek–Segafredo
Final		Eddie Dunbar	Fabio Jakobsen	Aaron Van Poucke	Márton Dina	Trek–Segafredo

- On stage 2, Jens Reynders, who was second in the points classification, wore the green jersey, because first-placed Olav Kooij wore the yellow jersey as the leader of the general classification.
- On stage 3, Rudy Barbier, who was second in the points classification, wore the green jersey, because first-placed Jens Reynders wore the yellow jersey as the leader of the general classification.
- On stage 5, Rudy Barbier, who was second in the points classification, wore the green jersey, because first-placed Fabio Jakobsen wore the yellow jersey as the leader of the general classification.

== Final classification standings ==
Legend
Yellow jersey	Denotes the winner of the general classification	Green jersey	Denotes the winner of the points classification
Red jersey	Denotes the winner of the mountains classification	White jersey	Denotes the winner of the Hungarian rider classification

=== General classification ===
Final general classification (1–10)
Rank	Rider	Team	Time
1	Eddie Dunbar (IRL)	INEOS Grenadiers	20h 38' 43"
2	Óscar Rodríguez (ESP)	Movistar Team	+ 23"
3	Samuele Battistella (ITA)	Astana Qazaqstan Team	+ 28"
4	Edoardo Zambanini (ITA)	Team Bahrain Victorious	+ 29"
5	Carl Fredrik Hagen (NOR)	Israel–Premier Tech	+ 35"
6	Niklas Eg (DEN)	Uno-X Pro Cycling Team	+ 36"
7	Krists Neilands (LVA)	Israel–Premier Tech	+ 43"
8	Patrick Konrad (AUT)	Bora–Hansgrohe	+ 50"
9	Anthon Charmig (DEN)	Uno-X Pro Cycling Team	+ 59"
10	Kamiel Bonneu (BEL)	Sport Vlaanderen–Baloise	+ 1' 01"

=== Points classification ===
Final points classification (1–10)
Rank	Rider	Team	Points
1	Fabio Jakobsen (NED)	Quick-Step Alpha Vinyl Team	47
2	Rudy Barbier (FRA)	Israel–Premier Tech	42
3	Sasha Weemaes (BEL)	Sport Vlaanderen–Baloise	31
4	Jens Reynders (BEL)	Sport Vlaanderen–Baloise	29
5	Elia Viviani (ITA)	INEOS Grenadiers	23
6	Max Kanter (GER)	Movistar Team	21
7	Dylan Groenewegen (NED)	Team BikeExchange–Jayco	19
8	Emil Dima (ROU)	Giotti Victoria–Savini Due	19
9	Antonio Tiberi (ITA)	Trek–Segafredo	15
10	Toon Vandebosch (BEL)	Alpecin–Fenix	15

=== Mountains classification ===
Final mountains classification (1–10)
Rank	Rider	Team	Points
1	Aaron Van Poucke (BEL)	Sport Vlaanderen–Baloise	34
2	Nicolas Dalla Valle (ITA)	Giotti Victoria–Savini Due	14
3	Umberto Marengo (ITA)	Drone Hopper–Androni Giocattoli	11
4	Antonio Tiberi (ITA)	Trek–Segafredo	10
5	Jens Reynders (BEL)	Sport Vlaanderen–Baloise	8
6	Emil Dima (ROU)	Giotti Victoria–Savini Due	8
7	Eddie Dunbar (IRL)	INEOS Grenadiers	7
8	Márton Dina (HUN)	Eolo–Kometa	7
9	Viktor Filutás (HUN)	Adria Mobil	6
10	Óscar Rodríguez (ESP)	Movistar Team	5

=== Hungarian rider classification ===
Final Hungarian rider classification (1–10)
Rank	Rider	Team	Time
1	Márton Dina (HUN)	Eolo–Kometa	20h 41' 14"
2	Gergely Szarka (HUN)	Giotti Victoria–Savini Due	+ 4' 14"
3	Ádám Karl (HUN)	Hungary	+ 12' 39"
4	Márton Solymosi (HUN)	Hungary	+ 13' 19"
5	Péter Kusztor (HUN)	Team Novo Nordisk	+ 15' 41"
6	Dávid Kovács (HUN)	Hungary	+ 21' 48"
7	Bence Mészáros (HUN)	Hungary	+ 24' 28"
8	Viktor Filutás (HUN)	Adria Mobil	+ 24' 53"
9	Zétény Szijártó (HUN)	Hungary	+ 27' 59"
10	Gergő Orosz (HUN)	Hungary	+ 31' 38"

=== Team classification ===
Final team classification (1–10)
Rank	Team	Time
1	Trek–Segafredo	61h 58' 48"
2	Movistar Team	+ 57"
3	Alpecin–Fenix	+ 2' 00"
4	Caja Rural–Seguros RGA	+ 2' 02"
5	Astana Qazaqstan Team	+ 2' 10"
6	Team Bahrain Victorious	+ 2' 17"
7	Human Powered Health	+ 2' 18"
8	Eolo–Kometa	+ 2' 43"
9	Sport Vlaanderen–Baloise	+ 2' 57"
10	Israel–Premier Tech	+ 3' 38"

== UCI point ranking ==
The event is in class ME 2.1 in Europe Tour Calendar. It is open for riders of the ME category and U23 and in accordance with article 2.10.008 of the UCI regulations, points are awarded as follows for the UCI ranking:

Position	1.	2.	3.	4.	5.	6.	7.	8.	9.	10.	11.	12.	13.-15.	16.-25.
General classification	125	85	70	60	50	40	35	30	25	20	15	10	5	3
Per stage	14	5	3
Leader	4

Classification
Position	Rider	Team	General	Stage	Leader	Total
1.	(Republic of Ireland) Eddie Dunbar	INEOS Grenadiers	125	5	-	130
2.	(Spain) Óscar Rodríguez	Movistar Team	85	3	-	88
3.	(Italy) Samuele Battistella	Astana Qazaqstan Team	70	-	-	70
4.	(Italy) Edoardo Zambanini	Team Bahrain Victorious	60	-	-	60
5.	(Norway) Carl Fredrik Hagen	Israel–Premier Tech	50	-	-	50
6.	(Netherlands) Fabio Jakobsen	Deceuninck–Quick-Step	-	33	8	41
7.	(Denmark) Niklas Eg	Uno-X Pro Cycling Team	40	-	-	40
8.	(Latvia) Krists Neilands	Israel–Premier Tech	35	-	-	35
9.	(Austria) Patrick Konrad	Bora–Hansgrohe	30	-	-	30
10.	(Denmark) Anthon Charmig	Uno-X Pro Cycling Team	25	-	-	25

== See also ==
- 2022 in men's road cycling
- 2022 in sports
