= 1931 Tour de Hongrie =

Race details
- Dates: 4–8 September
- Stages: 5
- Distance: 1,068 km (663.6 mi)
- Winning time: 38h 10' 16"

Results
	Winner	István Liszkay (HUN)
	Second	István Nemes (HUN)
	Third	Guglielmo Segato (ITA)
	Team	Italy (national team)

The 1931 Tour de Hongrie was the sixth edition of the Tour de Hongrie cycle race and was held from 4 to 8 September 1931. The race started and finished in Budapest. The race was won by István Liszkay.

== Route ==
Stages of the 1931 Tour de Hongrie
Stage	Date	Route	Distance	Winner
1	4 September	Budapest to Pécs	220 km (137 mi)	Lino Carlotti (ITA)
2	5 September	Pécs to Tapolca	216 km (134 mi)	István Nemes (HUN)
3	6 September	Tapolca to Tapolca	218 km (135 mi)	Adamo Dabini (ITA)
4	7 September	Tapolca to Sopron	190 km (118 mi)	Armando Jori (ITA)
5	8 September	Sopron to Budapest	224 km (139 mi)	Károly Szenes (HUN)
Total			1,068 km (664 mi)	

== General classification ==
Final general classification

Rank	Rider	Team	Time
1	István Liszkay (HUN)	BSE	38h 10' 16"
2	István Nemes (HUN)	Postás	+ 32' 35"
3	Guglielmo Segato (ITA)	Italy	+ 34' 38"
