= 1963 Tour de Hongrie =

Race details
- Dates: 17–22 June
- Stages: 8
- Distance: 942 km (585.3 mi)
- Winning time: 22h 49' 58"

Results
Jersey awarded to the overall winner	Winner	András Mészáros (HUN)
	Second	Lothar Höhne (GDR)
	Third	János Juszkó (HUN)
	Team	Ú. Dózsa II.

The 1963 Tour de Hongrie was the 19th edition of the Tour de Hongrie cycle race and was held from 17 to 22 June 1963. The race started and finished in Szombathely. The race was won by András Mészáros.

== General classification ==
Final general classification

Rank	Rider	Team	Time
1	András Mészáros (HUN)	Ú. Dózsa	22h 49' 58"
2	Lothar Höhne (GDR)	East Germany	+ 20"
3	János Juszkó (HUN)	BVSC	+ 1' 54"
