= Csaba Szekeres =

Hungarian road cyclist

Personal information
- Born: 30 January 1977 (age 49) Budapest, Hungary

Cycling career
- Sport: Cycling
- Current team: Retired
- Discipline: Road
- Role: Rider

Amateur teams
- 1997–1999: Girardengo–Alplast
- 2003–2005: P-Nívó Betonexpressz FTC
- 2008: Atlantis Casino KSE

Professional teams
- 1999: Selle Italia (stagiaire)
- 2000–2002: Aguardiente Néctar–Selle Italia
- 2006–2007: P-Nívó Betonexpressz 2000 Kft.se

Major wins
- One-day races and classics National Road Race Championships (1998) National Time Trial Championships (2005)

Csaba Szekeres (born 30 January 1977) is a Hungarian former road cyclist. Professional from 2000 to 2007, he notably won the Hungarian National Road Race Championships in 1998 and the Hungarian National Time Trial Championships in 2005. He also competed in the UCI World Time Trial Championships four times as well as in the road race at the 2001 UCI Road World Championships.

== Major results ==
1998
National Road Championships

1st Road race
2nd Time trial

2000
1st Stage 5 Tour du Faso
2001
2nd Road race, National Road Championships
2002
2nd Time trial, National Road Championships
2003
2nd Time trial, National Road Championships
2004
2nd Time trial, National Road Championships
7th Overall Tour de Hongrie
10th GP Kooperativa
2005
1st Time trial, National Road Championships
8th Puchar Uzdrowisk Karpackich
2006
1st Stages 4 & 12b Tour de Pécs
2nd Time trial, National Road Championships
3rd Overall Tour de Hongrie
2007
3rd Road race, National Road Championships
6th GP Kooperativa
