= 1930 Tour de Hongrie =

Race details
- Dates: 4–8 September
- Stages: 5
- Distance: 1,016 km (631.3 mi)
- Winning time: 36h 29' 44"

Results
	Winner	Vasco Bergamaschi (ITA)
	Second	János Pech (HUN)
	Third	Andrea Minasso (ITA)
	Team	Postás

The 1930 Tour de Hongrie was the fifth edition of the Tour de Hongrie cycle race and was held from 4 to 8 September 1930. The race started and finished in Budapest. The race was won by Vasco Bergamaschi.

== Route ==
Stages of the 1930 Tour de Hongrie
Stage	Date	Route	Distance	Winner
1	4 September	Budapest to Debrecen	231 km (144 mi)	Andrea Minasso (ITA)
2	5 September	Debrecen to Hódmezővásárhely	205 km (127 mi)	László Vida (HUN)
3	6 September	Hódmezővásárhely to Budapest	211 km (131 mi)	Andrea Minasso (ITA)
4	7 September	Budapest to Keszthely	175 km (109 mi)	Andrea Minasso (ITA)
5	8 September	Keszthely to Budapest	194 km (121 mi)	Andrea Minasso (ITA)
Total			1,016 km (631 mi)	

== General classification ==
Final general classification

Rank	Rider	Team	Time
1	Vasco Bergamaschi (ITA)	Italy	36h 29' 44"
2	János Pech (HUN)	Postás	+ 5' 20"
3	Andrea Minasso (ITA)	Italy	+ 5' 20"
