= 1993 Tour de Hongrie =

Race details
- Dates: 27 July – 1 August
- Stages: 7
- Distance: 945 km (587.2 mi)
- Winning time: 23h 40' 58"

Results
Jersey awarded to the overall winner	Winner	Jens Dittmann (GER)	(Thüringen)
	Second	Gábor Kovács (HUN)	(Tipográfia-Bianchi)
	Third	Dominique Perras (CAN)	(Besançon)
Jersey awarded to the points classification winner	Points	Evgeni Prisyazhenko (UKR)	(Lvov)
Jersey awarded to the mountains classification winner	Mountains	Martin Kukk (FRA)	(Besançon)
	Team	Thüringen	

The 1993 Tour de Hongrie was the 22nd edition of the Tour de Hongrie cycle race and was held from 27 July to 1 August 1993. The race started and finished in Budapest. The race was won by Jens Dittmann.

== Route ==
Stages of the 1993 Tour de Hongrie
Stage	Date	Route	Distance	Type	Winner
1	27 July	Budapest to Győr	117 km (73 mi)	Plain stage	Csaba Steig (HUN)
2	28 July	Győr to Siófok	127 km (79 mi)	Hilly stage	Gunther Nauwelaerts (BEL)
3	29 July	Siófok to Szekszárd	165 km (103 mi)	Hilly stage	Chorniy (UKR)
4	30 July	Szekszárd to Szolnok	210 km (130 mi)	Plain stage	Marco Polanc (SLO)
5	31 July	Szolnok to Eger	126 km (78 mi)	Plain stage	Uwe Zeidler (GER)
6	31 July	Felsőtárkány to Répáshuta	22 km (14 mi)	Individual time trial	Dietmar Müller (GER)
7	1 August	Miskolc to Budapest	178 km (111 mi)	Hilly stage	Csaba Steig (HUN)
Total			945 km (587 mi)		

== General classification ==
Final general classification

Rank	Rider	Team	Time
1	Jens Dittmann (GER)	Thüringen	23h 40' 58"
2	Gábor Kovács (HUN)	Tipográfia-Bianchi	+ 16"
3	Dominique Perras (CAN)	Besançon	+ 17"

== See also ==
- 1993 in sports
