= 2026 Tour de Hongrie =

2026 UCI ProSeries

Race details
- Dates: 13–17 May 2026
- Stages: 5
- Distance: 836.5 km (519.8 mi)
- Winning time: 16h 57' 21"

Results
Jersey awarded to the overall winner	Winner	Jakob Söderqvist (SWE)	(Lidl–Trek)
	Second	Benoît Cosnefroy (FRA)	(UAE Team Emirates XRG)
	Third	Luke Plapp (AUS)	(Team Jayco–AlUla)
Jersey awarded to the points classification winner	Points	Tim Merlier (BEL)	(Soudal–Quick-Step)
Jersey awarded to the mountains classification winner	Mountains	Erik Fetter (HUN)	(Team United Shipping)
	Team	(Italy) Team Polti VisitMalta	

The 2026 Tour de Hongrie was the 47th edition of the Tour de Hongrie, which takes place between 13 and 17 May 2026. The race was rated as a 2.Pro-category event as part of the 2026 UCI ProSeries.

== Teams ==
Seven UCI WorldTeams, seven UCI ProTeams, four UCI Continental teams and the Hungarian national team made up the nineteen teams that participated in the race.

UCI WorldTeams

- Lidl–Trek
- NSN Cycling Team
- Soudal–Quick-Step
- Team Bahrain Victorious
- Team Jayco–AlUla
- UAE Team Emirates XRG
- XDS Astana Team

UCI ProTeams

- Caja Rural–Seguros RGA
- Cofidis
- MBH Bank CSB Telecom Fort
- Modern Adventure Pro Cycling
- Pinarello–Q36.5 Pro Cycling Team
- Team Polti VisitMalta
- Team Flanders–Baloise

UCI Continental Teams

- Campana Imballaggi–Morbiato–Trentino
- Pauwels Sauzen–Altez Industriebouw Cycling Team
- Solme–Olmo–Arvedi
- Team United Shipping

National Teams

- Hungary

== Route ==
Stage characteristics and winners
Stage	Date	Course	Distance	Type	Stage winner
1	13 May	Gyula to Békéscsaba	143.1 km (88.9 mi)	Flat stage	Tim Merlier (BEL)
2	14 May	Szarvas to Paks	205.8 km (127.9 mi)	Flat stage	Benoît Cosnefroy (FRA)
3	15 May	Kaposvár to Szekszárd	152.3 km (94.6 mi)	Hilly stage	Tim Merlier (BEL)
4	16 May	Mohács to Pécs	188.2 km (116.9 mi)	Intermediate stage	Jakob Söderqvist (SWE)
5	17 May	Balatonalmádi to Veszprém	147.1 km (91.4 mi)	Hilly stage	Tim Merlier (BEL)
Total			836.5 km (519.8 mi)		

== Stages ==
=== Stage 1 ===
13 May 2026 — Gyula to Békéscsaba, 143.1 km (88.9 mi)

Stage 1 Result
Rank	Rider	Team	Time
1	Tim Merlier (BEL)	Soudal–Quick-Step	2h 52' 56"
2	Juan Sebastián Molano (COL)	UAE Team Emirates XRG	+ 0"
3	Phil Bauhaus (GER)	Team Bahrain Victorious	+ 0"
4	Simone Buda (ITA)	Solme–Olmo–Arvedi	+ 0"
5	Max Kanter (GER)	XDS Astana Team	+ 0"
6	Nicolò Parisini (ITA)	Pinarello–Q36.5 Pro Cycling Team	+ 0"
7	Fernando Gaviria (COL)	Caja Rural–Seguros RGA	+ 0"
8	Lorenzo De Longhi (ITA)	Campana Imballaggi–Morbiato–Trentino	+ 0"
9	Tyler Stites (USA)	Modern Adventure Pro Cycling	+ 0"
10	Bálint Kárpáti (HUN)	Hungary	+ 0"

General classification after Stage 1
Rank	Rider	Team	Time
1	Tim Merlier (BEL)	Soudal–Quick-Step	2h 52' 46"
2	Kristian Egholm (DEN)	Lidl–Trek	+ 1"
3	Juan Sebastián Molano (COL)	UAE Team Emirates XRG	+ 4"
4	Mathias Sunekær Norsgaard (DEN)	Lidl–Trek	+ 4"
5	Phil Bauhaus (GER)	Team Bahrain Victorious	+ 6"
6	Benoît Cosnefroy (FRA)	UAE Team Emirates XRG	+ 7"
7	Simone Buda (ITA)	Solme–Olmo–Arvedi	+ 10"
8	Max Kanter (GER)	XDS Astana Team	+ 10"
9	Nicolò Parisini (ITA)	Pinarello–Q36.5 Pro Cycling Team	+ 10"
10	Fernando Gaviria (COL)	Caja Rural–Seguros RGA	+ 10"

=== Stage 2 ===
14 May 2026 — Szarvas to Paks, 205.8 km (127.9 mi)

Stage 2 Result
Rank	Rider	Team	Time
1	Benoît Cosnefroy (FRA)	UAE Team Emirates XRG	4h 20' 51"
2	Alexis Renard (FRA)	Cofidis	+ 2"
3	Max Kanter (GER)	XDS Astana Team	+ 2"
4	Elias Maris (BEL)	Team Flanders–Baloise	+ 2"
5	Fernando Gaviria (COL)	Caja Rural–Seguros RGA	+ 2"
6	Tim Merlier (BEL)	Soudal–Quick-Step	+ 2"
7	Ben Oliver (NZL)	Modern Adventure Pro Cycling	+ 2"
8	Tyler Stites (USA)	Modern Adventure Pro Cycling	+ 2"
9	Nicolò Parisini (ITA)	Pinarello–Q36.5 Pro Cycling Team	+ 2"
10	Juan Sebastián Molano (COL)	UAE Team Emirates XRG	+ 2"

General classification after Stage 2
Rank	Rider	Team	Time
1	Benoît Cosnefroy (FRA)	UAE Team Emirates XRG	7h 13' 33"
2	Kristian Egholm (DEN)	Lidl–Trek	+ 4"
3	Tim Merlier (BEL)	Soudal–Quick-Step	+ 6"
4	Juan Sebastián Molano (COL)	UAE Team Emirates XRG	+ 10"
5	Alexis Renard (FRA)	Cofidis	+ 10"
6	Mathias Sunekær Norsgaard (DEN)	Lidl–Trek	+ 10"
7	Kay De Bruyckere (BEL)	Pauwels Sauzen–Altez Industriebouw Cycling Team	+ 11"
8	Max Kanter (GER)	XDS Astana Team	+ 12"
9	Fernando Gaviria (COL)	Caja Rural–Seguros RGA	+ 16"
10	Nicolò Parisini (ITA)	Pinarello–Q36.5 Pro Cycling Team	+ 16"

=== Stage 3 ===
15 May 2026 — Kaposvár to Szekszárd, 152.3 km (94.6 mi)

Stage 3 Result
Rank	Rider	Team	Time
1	Tim Merlier (BEL)	Soudal–Quick-Step	3h 16' 03"
2	Fernando Gaviria (COL)	Caja Rural–Seguros RGA	+ 0"
3	Juan Sebastián Molano (COL)	UAE Team Emirates XRG	+ 0"
4	Max Kanter (GER)	XDS Astana Team	+ 0"
5	Lorenzo De Longhi (ITA)	Campana Imballaggi–Morbiato–Trentino	+ 0"
6	Ben Oliver (NZL)	Modern Adventure Pro Cycling	+ 0"
7	Simone Buda (ITA)	Solme–Olmo–Arvedi	+ 0"
8	Alexis Renard (FRA)	Cofidis	+ 0"
9	Itamar Einhorn (ISR)	NSN Cycling Team	+ 0"
10	Davide Persico (ITA)	MBH Bank CSB Telecom Fort	+ 0"

General classification after Stage 3
Rank	Rider	Team	Time
1	Tim Merlier (BEL)	Soudal–Quick-Step	10h 29' 32"
2	Benoît Cosnefroy (FRA)	UAE Team Emirates XRG	+ 4"
3	Juan Sebastián Molano (COL)	UAE Team Emirates XRG	+ 10"
4	Victor Vercouillie (BEL)	Team Flanders–Baloise	+ 13"
5	Fernando Gaviria (COL)	Caja Rural–Seguros RGA	+ 14"
6	Alexis Renard (FRA)	Cofidis	+ 14"
7	Mathias Sunekær Norsgaard (DEN)	Lidl–Trek	+ 14"
8	Kay De Bruyckere (BEL)	Pauwels Sauzen–Altez Industriebouw Cycling Team	+ 15"
9	Max Kanter (GER)	XDS Astana Team	+ 16"
10	Michael Vanthourenhout (BEL)	Pauwels Sauzen–Altez Industriebouw Cycling Team	+ 18"

=== Stage 4 ===
16 May 2026 — Mohács to Pécs, 188.2 km (116.9 mi)

Stage 4 Result
Rank	Rider	Team	Time
1	Jakob Söderqvist (SWE)	Lidl–Trek	2h 58' 08"
2	Adrián Benito (ESP)	Team Polti VisitMalta	+ 32"
3	Luke Plapp (AUS)	Team Jayco–AlUla	+ 41"
4	Junior Lecerf (BEL)	Soudal–Quick-Step	+ 41"
5	Benoît Cosnefroy (FRA)	UAE Team Emirates XRG	+ 41"
6	Walter Calzoni (ITA)	Pinarello–Q36.5 Pro Cycling Team	+ 59"
7	Alessandro Fancellu (ITA)	MBH Bank CSB Telecom Fort	+ 59"
8	Samuele Zoccarato (ITA)	MBH Bank CSB Telecom Fort	+ 1' 06"
9	Adrià Pericas (ESP)	UAE Team Emirates XRG	+ 1' 06"
10	Jakob Omrzel (SLO)	Team Bahrain Victorious	+ 1' 10"

General classification after Stage 4
Rank	Rider	Team	Time
1	Jakob Söderqvist (SWE)	Lidl–Trek	13h 27' 45"
2	Benoît Cosnefroy (FRA)	UAE Team Emirates XRG	+ 40"
3	Luke Plapp (AUS)	Team Jayco–AlUla	+ 52"
4	Junior Lecerf (BEL)	Soudal–Quick-Step	+ 56"
5	Alessandro Fancellu (ITA)	MBH Bank CSB Telecom Fort	+ 1' 14"
6	Walter Calzoni (ITA)	Pinarello–Q36.5 Pro Cycling Team	+ 1' 14"
7	Adrià Pericas (ESP)	UAE Team Emirates XRG	+ 1' 21"
8	Jakob Omrzel (SLO)	Team Bahrain Victorious	+ 1' 25"
9	Attila Valter (HUN)	Team Bahrain Victorious	+ 1' 34"
10	Artem Fofonov (FRA)	XDS Astana Team	+ 1' 38"

=== Stage 5 ===
17 May 2026 — Balatonalmádi to Veszprém, 147.1 km (91.4 mi)

Stage 5 Result
Rank	Rider	Team	Time
1	Tim Merlier (BEL)	Soudal–Quick-Step	3h 29' 36"
2	Alexis Renard (FRA)	Cofidis	+ 0"
3	Fernando Gaviria (COL)	Caja Rural–Seguros RGA	+ 0"
4	Alberto Dainese (ITA)	Soudal–Quick-Step	+ 0"
5	Max Kanter (GER)	XDS Astana Team	+ 0"
6	Ben Oliver (NZL)	Modern Adventure Pro Cycling	+ 0"
7	Tommaso Bessega (ITA)	Team Polti VisitMalta	+ 0"
8	Nikiforos Arvanitou (GRE)	Team United Shipping	+ 0"
9	Juan Sebastián Molano (COL)	UAE Team Emirates XRG	+ 0"
10	Zsombor Takács (HUN)	MBH Bank CSB Telecom Fort	+ 0"

General classification after Stage 5
Rank	Rider	Team	Time
1	Jakob Söderqvist (SWE)	Lidl–Trek	16h 57' 21"
2	Benoît Cosnefroy (FRA)	UAE Team Emirates XRG	+ 40"
3	Luke Plapp (AUS)	Team Jayco–AlUla	+ 49"
4	Junior Lecerf (BEL)	Soudal–Quick-Step	+ 56"
5	Alessandro Fancellu (ITA)	MBH Bank CSB Telecom Fort	+ 1' 14"
6	Walter Calzoni (ITA)	Pinarello–Q36.5 Pro Cycling Team	+ 1' 14"
7	Adrià Pericas (ESP)	UAE Team Emirates XRG	+ 1' 21"
8	Jakob Omrzel (SLO)	Team Bahrain Victorious	+ 1' 25"
9	Attila Valter (HUN)	Team Bahrain Victorious	+ 1' 34"
10	Artem Fofonov (FRA)	XDS Astana Team	+ 1' 38"

== Classification leadership table ==
Classification leadership by stage
Stage	Winner	General classification	Points classification	Mountains classification	Hungarian rider classification	Team classification
1	Tim Merlier	Tim Merlier	Tim Merlier	not awarded	Bálint Kárpáti	Pinarello–Q36.5 Pro Cycling Team
2	Benoît Cosnefroy	Benoît Cosnefroy	Tim Merlier	Edoardo Zamperini	Erik Fetter	UAE Team Emirates XRG
3	Tim Merlier	Tim Merlier	Tim Merlier	Victor Vercouillie	Attila Valter	UAE Team Emirates XRG
4	Jakob Söderqvist	Jakob Söderqvist	Tim Merlier	Adrián Benito	Attila Valter	Team Polti VisitMalta
5	Tim Merlier	Jakob Söderqvist	Tim Merlier	Erik Fetter	Attila Valter	Team Polti VisitMalta
Final		Jakob Söderqvist	Tim Merlier	Erik Fetter	Attila Valter	Team Polti VisitMalta

== Classification standings ==
Legend
Denotes the winner of the general classification	Denotes the winner of the points classification
Denotes the winner of the mountains classification	Denotes the winner of the Hungarian rider classification

=== General classification ===
Final general classification (1–10)
Rank	Rider	Team	Time
1	Jakob Söderqvist (SWE)	Lidl–Trek	16h 57' 21"
2	Benoît Cosnefroy (FRA)	UAE Team Emirates XRG	+ 40"
3	Luke Plapp (AUS)	Team Jayco–AlUla	+ 49"
4	Junior Lecerf (BEL)	Soudal–Quick-Step	+ 56"
5	Alessandro Fancellu (ITA)	MBH Bank CSB Telecom Fort	+ 1' 14"
6	Walter Calzoni (ITA)	Pinarello–Q36.5 Pro Cycling Team	+ 1' 14"
7	Adrià Pericas (ESP)	UAE Team Emirates XRG	+ 1' 21"
8	Jakob Omrzel (SLO)	Team Bahrain Victorious	+ 1' 25"
9	Attila Valter (HUN)	Team Bahrain Victorious	+ 1' 34"
10	Artem Fofonov (FRA)	XDS Astana Team	+ 1' 38"

=== Points classification ===
Final points classification (1–10)
Rank	Rider	Team	Points
1	Tim Merlier (BEL)	Soudal–Quick-Step	68
2	Max Kanter (GER)	XDS Astana Team	46
3	Fernando Gaviria (COL)	Caja Rural–Seguros RGA	46
4	Alexis Renard (FRA)	Cofidis	36
5	Benoît Cosnefroy (FRA)	UAE Team Emirates XRG	34
6	Juan Sebastián Molano (COL)	UAE Team Emirates XRG	33
7	Adrián Benito (ESP)	Team Polti VisitMalta	32
8	Jakob Söderqvist (SWE)	Lidl–Trek	28
9	Ben Oliver (NZL)	Modern Adventure Pro Cycling	22
10	Kristian Egholm (DEN)	Lidl–Trek	20

=== Mountains classification ===
Final mountains classification (1–10)
Rank	Rider	Team	Points
1	Erik Fetter (HUN)	Team United Shipping	53
2	Adrián Benito (ESP)	Team Polti VisitMalta	30
3	Andrea Pietrobon (ITA)	Team Polti VisitMalta	30
4	Jakob Söderqvist (SWE)	Lidl–Trek	28
5	Victor Vercouillie (BEL)	Team Flanders–Baloise	8
6	Luke Plapp (AUS)	Team Jayco–AlUla	8
7	Samuele Zoccarato (ITA)	MBH Bank CSB Telecom Fort	8
8	Siebe Deweirdt (BEL)	Team Flanders–Baloise	8
9	Jamie Meehan (IRL)	Cofidis	7
10	Junior Lecerf (BEL)	Soudal–Quick-Step	6

=== Hungarian rider classification ===
Final Hungarian rider classification (1–10)
Rank	Rider	Team	Time
1	Attila Valter (HUN)	Team Bahrain Victorious	16h 58' 55"
2	Márton Dina (HUN)	MBH Bank CSB Telecom Fort	+ 16"
3	Gergő Grosz (HUN)	Hungary	+ 10' 29"
4	Erik Fetter (HUN)	Team United Shipping	+ 15' 34"
5	Zsombor Takács (HUN)	MBH Bank CSB Telecom Fort	+ 17' 02"
6	János Pelikán (HUN)	Team United Shipping	+ 19' 19"
7	Bálint Kárpáti (HUN)	Hungary	+ 21' 06"
8	Marcell Takács (HUN)	Hungary	+ 25' 41"
9	Márk Varga (HUN)	Hungary	+ 27' 36"
10	Márton Solymosi (HUN)	Hungary	+ 29' 00"

=== Team classification ===
Final team classification (1–10)
Rank	Team	Time
1	(Italy) Team Polti VisitMalta	50h 56' 44"
2	(Hungary) MBH Bank CSB Telecom Fort	+ 10"
3	(United Arab Emirates) UAE Team Emirates XRG	+ 29"
4	Team Bahrain Victorious	+ 34"
5	(Switzerland) Pinarello–Q36.5 Pro Cycling Team	+ 57"
6	(France) Cofidis	+ 1' 44"
7	(Kazakhstan) XDS Astana Team	+ 1' 58"
8	(Switzerland) NSN Cycling Team	+ 3' 01"
9	(Germany) Lidl–Trek	+ 7' 52"
10	(Belgium) Team Flanders–Baloise	+ 10' 49"
