= 1955 Tour de Hongrie =

Race details
- Dates: 13–17 September
- Stages: 5
- Distance: 938 km (582.8 mi)
- Winning time: 29h 48' 11"

Results
	Winner	Győző Török (HUN)
	Second	József Albert (HUN)
	Third	Lajos Szabó (HUN)
	Team	Honvéd

The 1955 Tour de Hongrie was the 16th edition of the Tour de Hongrie cycle race and was held from 13 to 17 September 1955. The race started and finished in Budapest. The race was won by Győző Török.

== Route ==
Stages of the 1955 Tour de Hongrie
Stage	Date	Route	Distance	Winner
1	13 September	Budapest to Miskolc	182 km (113 mi)	Győző Török (HUN)
2	14 September	Miskolc to Debrecen	138 km (86 mi)	Márton Bencze (HUN)
3	15 September	Debrecen to Szeged	227 km (141 mi)	György Viszt (HUN)
4	16 September	Szeged to Pécs	195 km (121 mi)	Mihály Csikós (HUN)
5	17 September	Pécs to Budapest	196 km (122 mi)	János Ötvös (HUN)
Total			938 km (583 mi)	

== General classification ==
Final general classification

Rank	Rider	Team	Time
1	Győző Török (HUN)	Honvéd	29h 48' 11"
2	József Albert (HUN)	Kinizsi	+ 4' 34"
3	Lajos Szabó (HUN)	Dózsa	+ 10' 32"
