= 1997 Tour de Hongrie =

Race details
- Dates: 22–27 July
- Stages: 5 + Prologue
- Distance: 854 km (530.7 mi)
- Winning time: 21h 28' 55"

Results
Jersey awarded to the overall winner	Winner	Zoltán Bebtó (HUN)	(Stollwerck-FTC)
	Second	Yuri Zajac (UKR)	(Schwinn-Csepel)
	Third	Balázs Rohtmer (HUN)	(Siófok-Cora)
Jersey awarded to the points classification winner	Points	Arno van Hattem (NED)	(Postás-Matáv)
Jersey awarded to the mountains classification winner	Mountains	Boris Ljujić (FRY)	(Čukarički)
	Team	Stollwerck-FTC	

The 1997 Tour de Hongrie was the 26th edition of the Tour de Hongrie cycle race and was held from 22 to 27 July 1997. The race started and finished in Budapest. The race was won by Zoltán Bebtó.

== General classification ==
Final general classification

Rank	Rider	Team	Time
1	Zoltán Bebtó (HUN)	Stollwerck-FTC	21h 28' 55"
2	Yuri Zajac (UKR)	Schwinn-Csepel	+ 10"
3	Balázs Rohtmer (HUN)	Siófok-Cora	+ 12"
