= 2002 Tour de Hongrie =

Race details
- Dates: 6–11 August
- Stages: 6 + Prologue
- Distance: 665.2 km (413.3 mi)
- Winning time: 14h 31' 23"

Results
Jersey awarded to the overall winner	Winner	Zoltán Vanik (HUN)	(Postás-Matáv)
	Second	Jan Faltýnek (CZE)	(Joko-Velamos)
	Third	Radek Blahut (CZE)	(Joko-Velamos)
Jersey awarded to the points classification winner	Points	Vladyslav Prygunov (UKR)	(SK Nikolaev)
Jersey awarded to the mountains classification winner	Mountains	Róbert Nagy (SVK)	(Mapei-Kanizsa KK)
	Team	Joko-Velamos	

The 2002 Tour de Hongrie was the 29th edition of the Tour de Hongrie cycle race and was held from 6 to 11 August 2002. The race started in Nagykanizsa and finished in Budapest. The race was won by Zoltán Vanik.

== General classification ==
Final general classification

Rank	Rider	Team	Time
1	Zoltán Vanik (HUN)	Postás-Matáv	14h 31' 23"
2	Jan Faltýnek (CZE)	Joko-Velamos	+ 15"
3	Radek Blahut (CZE)	Joko-Velamos	+ 17"
