= 1996 Tour de Hongrie =

Race details
- Dates: 9–14 July
- Stages: 5 + Prologue
- Distance: 812 km (504.6 mi)
- Winning time: 20h 09' 06"

Results
Jersey awarded to the overall winner	Winner	Andrej Tolomanov (UKR)	(Ukraine)
	Second	János Istlstekker (HUN)	(Blikk-Stollwerck-FTC)
	Third	Károly Eisenkrammer (HUN)	(Szolnoki Cukorgyár)
Jersey awarded to the points classification winner	Points	Andrej Tolomanov (UKR)	(Ukraine)
Jersey awarded to the mountains classification winner	Mountains	Csaba Steig (HUN)	(Szolnoki Cukorgyár)
	Team	Blikk-Stollwerck-FTC	

The 1996 Tour de Hongrie was the 25th edition of the Tour de Hongrie cycle race and was held from 9 to 14 July 1996. The race started and finished in Budapest. The race was won by Andrej Tolomanov.

== General classification ==
Final general classification

Rank	Rider	Team	Time
1	Andrej Tolomanov (UKR)	Ukraine	20h 09' 06"
2	János Istlstekker (HUN)	Blikk-Stollwerck-FTC	+ 5"
3	Károly Eisenkrammer (HUN)	Szolnoki Cukorgyár	+ 15"
