= 2023 Tour de Hongrie =

2023 UCI ProSeries

Race details
- Dates: 10–14 May 2023
- Stages: 5
- Distance: 879 km (546.2 mi)
- Winning time: 17h 19' 28"

Results
Jersey awarded to the overall winner	Winner	Marc Hirschi (SUI)	(UAE Team Emirates)
	Second	Ben Tulett (GBR)	(Ineos Grenadiers)
	Third	Yannis Voisard (SUI)	(Tudor Pro Cycling Team)
Jersey awarded to the points classification winner	Points	Matúš Štoček (SVK)	(ATT Investments)
Jersey awarded to the mountains classification winner	Mountains	Sebastian Schönberger (AUT)	(Human Powered Health)
	Team	(United Kingdom) Ineos Grenadiers	

The 2023 Tour de Hongrie was the 44th edition of the Tour de Hongrie, which took place between 10 and 14 May 2023. It was the ninth edition since the race's revival in 2015, and was rated as a 2.Pro-category event as part of the 2023 UCI ProSeries. The Tour was to have consisted of five stages with a distance of 879 km and 7554 m of elevation gain, but bad weather led to stage 5 being neutralised before commencement with overall results based on standings at the end of stage 4.

== Teams ==
9 of the 18 UCI WorldTeams, 9 UCI ProTeams, 3 UCI Continental teams and the Hungarian national team made up the 22 teams that participated in the race, with six riders each.

UCI WorldTeams

- Alpecin–Deceuninck
- Bora–Hansgrohe
- Ineos Grenadiers
- Soudal–Quick-Step
- Team Bahrain Victorious
- Team DSM
- Team Jayco–AlUla
- Trek–Segafredo
- UAE Team Emirates

UCI ProTeams

- Caja Rural–Seguros RGA
- Eolo–Kometa
- Human Powered Health
- Israel–Premier Tech
- Lotto–Dstny
- Q36.5 Pro Cycling Team
- Team Flanders–Baloise
- Team Novo Nordisk
- Tudor Pro Cycling Team

UCI Continental Teams

- ATT Investments
- Epronex - Hungary Cycling Team
- Sofer–Savini Due–OMZ

National Teams

- Hungary

== Route ==
Stage characteristics and winners
Stage	Date	Route	Distance	Elevation gain	Type	Winner
1	10 May	Szentgotthárd to Szentgotthárd	168.6 km (104.8 mi)	821 m (2,694 ft)	Flat stage	Dylan Groenewegen (NED)
2	11 May	Zalaegerszeg to Keszthely	175.3 km (108.9 mi)	923 m (3,028 ft)	Flat stage	Fabio Jakobsen (NED)
3	12 May	Kaposvár to Pécs	179.9 km (111.8 mi)	2,511 m (8,238 ft)	Intermediate stage	Marc Hirschi (SUI)
4	13 May	Martonvásár to Dobogókő	206.4 km (128.3 mi)	2,646 m (8,681 ft)	Intermediate stage	Yannis Voisard (SUI)
5	14 May	Budapest to Budapest	~~150 km (93 mi)~~ 75 km (47 mi) (Note: The distance originally was 150 km, but before the start of the stage, the distance was shortened to 75 km and the stage was neutralized (cancalled) due to bad weather condition.)	~~224 m (735 ft)~~ 112 m (367 ft)	Flat stage	Stage neutralized
Total			~~879 km (546 mi)~~ 804 km (500 mi)	~~7,125 m (23,376 ft)~~ 7,013 m (23,009 ft)		

== Stages ==
=== Stage 1 ===
10 May 2023 — Szentgotthárd to Szentgotthárd, 168.6 km (104.8 mi)

Stage 1 Result (1–10)
Rank	Rider	Team	Time
1	Dylan Groenewegen (NED)	Team Jayco–AlUla	3h 42' 56"
2	Sam Bennett (IRL)	Bora–Hansgrohe	+ 0"
3	Caleb Ewan (AUS)	Lotto–Dstny	+ 0"
4	Phil Bauhaus (GER)	Team Bahrain Victorious	+ 0"
5	Álvaro José Hodeg (COL)	UAE Team Emirates	+ 0"
6	Maikel Zijlaard (NED)	Tudor Pro Cycling Team	+ 0"
7	Fabio Jakobsen (NED)	Soudal–Quick-Step	+ 0"
8	Matyáš Kopecký (CZE)	Team Novo Nordisk	+ 0"
9	Sasha Weemaes (BEL)	Human Powered Health	+ 0"
10	Jules Hesters (BEL)	Team Flanders–Baloise	+ 0"

General classification after Stage 1 (1–10)
Rank	Rider	Team	Time
1	Dylan Groenewegen (NED)	Team Jayco–AlUla	3h 42' 46"
2	Matúš Štoček (CZE)	ATT Investments	+ 2"
3	Sam Bennett (IRL)	Bora–Hansgrohe	+ 4"
4	Charles Planet (FRA)	Team Novo Nordisk	+ 5"
5	Caleb Ewan (AUS)	Lotto–Dstny	+ 6"
6	Balázs Rózsa (HUN)	Epronex - Hungary Cycling Team	+ 7"
7	Ward Vanhoof (BEL)	Team Flanders–Baloise	+ 9"
8	Zétény Szijártó (HUN)	Hungary	+ 9"
9	Phil Bauhaus (GER)	Team Bahrain Victorious	+ 10"
10	Álvaro José Hodeg (COL)	UAE Team Emirates	+ 10"

=== Stage 2 ===
11 May 2023 — Zalaegerszeg to Keszthely, 175.3 km (108.9 mi)

Stage 2 Result (1–10)
Rank	Rider	Team	Time
1	Fabio Jakobsen (NED)	Soudal–Quick-Step	4h 05' 21"
2	Phil Bauhaus (GER)	Team Bahrain Victorious	+ 0"
3	Vito Braet (BEL)	Team Flanders–Baloise	+ 0"
4	Casper van Uden (NED)	Team DSM	+ 0"
5	Maikel Zijlaard (NED)	Tudor Pro Cycling Team	+ 0"
6	Thibau Nys (BEL)	Trek–Segafredo	+ 0"
7	Caleb Ewan (AUS)	Lotto–Dstny	+ 0"
8	Taj Jones (AUS)	Israel–Premier Tech	+ 0"
9	Matteo Moschetti (ITA)	Q36.5 Pro Cycling Team	+ 0"
10	Matyáš Kopecký (CZE)	Team Novo Nordisk	+ 0"

General classification after Stage 2 (1–10)
Rank	Rider	Team	Time
1	Fabio Jakobsen (NED)	Soudal–Quick-Step	7h 48' 07"
2	Dylan Groenewegen (NED)	Team Jayco–AlUla	+ 0"
3	Matúš Štoček (CZE)	ATT Investments	+ 2"
4	Phil Bauhaus (GER)	Team Bahrain Victorious	+ 4"
5	Sam Bennett (IRL)	Bora–Hansgrohe	+ 4"
6	Filippo Ridolfo (ITA)	Team Novo Nordisk	+ 4"
7	Caleb Ewan (AUS)	Lotto–Dstny	+ 6"
8	Vito Braet (BEL)	Team Flanders–Baloise	+ 6"
9	Jhonatan Narváez (ECU)	Ineos Grenadiers	+ 7"
10	Daniel Turek (CZE)	ATT Investments	+ 7"

=== Stage 3 ===
12 May 2023 — Kaposvár to Pécs, 179.9 km (111.8 mi)

Stage 3 Result (1–10)
Rank	Rider	Team	Time
1	Marc Hirschi (SUI)	UAE Team Emirates	4h 26' 57"
2	Ben Tulett (GBR)	Ineos Grenadiers	+ 8"
3	Max Poole (GBR)	Team DSM	+ 10"
4	Sylvain Moniquet (BEL)	Lotto–Dstny	+ 12"
5	Oscar Onley (GBR)	Team DSM	+ 12"
6	Matteo Fabbro (ITA)	Bora–Hansgrohe	+ 12"
7	Egan Bernal (COL)	Ineos Grenadiers	+ 12"
8	Yannis Voisard (SUI)	Tudor Pro Cycling Team	+ 23"
9	Matteo Badilatti (SUI)	Q36.5 Pro Cycling Team	+ 23"
10	Márton Dina (HUN)	ATT Investments	+ 23"

General classification after Stage 3 (1–10)
Rank	Rider	Team	Time
1	Marc Hirschi (SUI)	UAE Team Emirates	12h 15' 04"
2	Ben Tulett (GBR)	Ineos Grenadiers	+ 10"
3	Max Poole (GBR)	Team DSM	+ 16"
4	Oscar Onley (GBR)	Team DSM	+ 22"
5	Sylvain Moniquet (BEL)	Lotto–Dstny	+ 22"
6	Matteo Fabbro (ITA)	Bora–Hansgrohe	+ 22"
7	Egan Bernal (COL)	Ineos Grenadiers	+ 22"
8	Márton Dina (HUN)	ATT Investments	+ 33"
9	Yannis Voisard (SUI)	Tudor Pro Cycling Team	+ 33"
9	Matteo Badilatti (SUI)	Q36.5 Pro Cycling Team	+ 33"

=== Stage 4 ===
13 May 2023 — Martonvásár to Dobogókő, 206.4 km (128.3 mi)

Stage 4 Result (1–10)
Rank	Rider	Team	Time
1	Yannis Voisard (SUI)	Tudor Pro Cycling Team	5h 04' 14"
2	Thibau Nys (BEL)	Trek–Segafredo	+ 10"
3	Sylvain Moniquet (BEL)	Lotto–Dstny	+ 10"
4	Marc Hirschi (SUI)	UAE Team Emirates	+ 10"
5	Ben Tulett (GBR)	Ineos Grenadiers	+ 10"
6	Max Poole (GBR)	Team DSM	+ 10"
7	Matteo Fabbro (ITA)	Bora–Hansgrohe	+ 10"
8	Oscar Onley (GBR)	Team DSM	+ 10"
9	Davide Piganzoli (ITA)	Eolo–Kometa	+ 10"
10	Paul Double (GBR)	Human Powered Health	+ 10"

General classification after Stage 4 (1–10)
Rank	Rider	Team	Time
1	Marc Hirschi (SUI)	UAE Team Emirates	17h 19' 28"
2	Ben Tulett (GBR)	Ineos Grenadiers	+ 10"
3	Yannis Voisard (SUI)	Tudor Pro Cycling Team	+ 13"
4	Max Poole (GBR)	Team DSM	+ 16"
5	Sylvain Moniquet (BEL)	Lotto–Dstny	+ 18"
6	Oscar Onley (GBR)	Team DSM	+ 22"
7	Matteo Fabbro (ITA)	Bora–Hansgrohe	+ 22"
8	Egan Bernal (COL)	Ineos Grenadiers	+ 22"
9	Davide Piganzoli (ITA)	Eolo–Kometa	+ 45"
10	Abel Balderstone (ESP)	Caja Rural–Seguros RGA	+ 45"

=== Stage 5 ===
14 May 2023 — Budapest to Budapest, 75 km (47 mi)

Stage 5 was cancelled due to bad weather and overall race classifications were determined on standings at the end of stage 4.

== Classification leadership table ==
Points for the points classification
Type	1	2	3	4	5	6	7	8	9	10
Stage finishes	15	12	10	8	6	5	4	3	2	1
Intermediate sprint	5	3	1	0						

Points for the mountains classification
Type	1	2	3	4	5	6	7
Points for Category	15	10	8	6	4	2	1
Points for Category	10	6	4	2	1	0	
Points for Category	5	3	1	0			

In the 2023 Tour de Hongrie, four different jerseys were awarded.

The general classification is calculated by adding each cyclist's finishing times on each stage. The leader of the general classification receives a yellow jersey, sponsored by the Hungarian Tourism Agency (Visit Hungary), Hungarian Public Road Company (Hungarian: Magyar Közút), and Hungarian Cycling Federation ("Bringasport"). The winner of this classification is considered the winner of the race.

The second classification is the points classification. Riders are awarded points for finishing in the top fifteen of each stage. Points are also on offer at intermediate sprints. The leader of the points classification wears a green jersey, sponsored by Škoda and Europcar.

There is also a mountains classification for which points are awarded for reaching the top of a climb before other riders. The climbs are categorized, in order of increasing difficulty, as first, second, and third-category. The leader of the mountains classification wears a red jersey, sponsored by Cofidis.

The fourth jersey is a classification for Hungarian riders, marked by a white jersey sponsored by the Bosch. Only Hungarian riders are eligible and they are ranked according to their placement in the general classification of the race.

The final classification is the team classification, for which the times of the best three cyclists in each team on each stage are added together; the leading team at the end of the race is the team with the lowest cumulative time.

Classification leadership by stage
Stage	Winner	General classification	Points classification	Mountains classification	Hungarian rider classification	Team classification
1	Dylan Groenewegen	Dylan Groenewegen	Dylan Groenewegen	Matúš Štoček	Balázs Rózsa	UAE Team Emirates
2	Fabio Jakobsen	Fabio Jakobsen	Phil Bauhaus	Matúš Štoček	Balázs Rózsa	Trek–Segafredo
3	Marc Hirschi	Marc Hirschi	Matúš Štoček	Filippo Ridolfo	Márton Dina	Ineos Grenadiers
4	Yannis Voisard	Marc Hirschi	Matúš Štoček	Sebastian Schönberger	Márton Dina	Ineos Grenadiers
5	Stage neutralized	Marc Hirschi	Matúš Štoček	Sebastian Schönberger	Márton Dina	Ineos Grenadiers
Final		Marc Hirschi	Matúš Štoček	Sebastian Schönberger	Márton Dina	Ineos Grenadiers

- On stage 2, Sam Bennett, who was second in the points classification, wore the green jersey, because first-placed Dylan Groenewegen wore the yellow jersey as the leader of the general classification.

== Final classification standings ==
Legend
Denotes the winner of the general classification	Denotes the winner of the points classification
Denotes the winner of the mountains classification	Denotes the winner of the Hungarian rider classification

=== General classification ===
Final general classification (1–10)
Rank	Rider	Team	Time
1	Marc Hirschi (SUI)	UAE Team Emirates	17h 19' 28"
2	Ben Tulett (GBR)	Ineos Grenadiers	+ 10"
3	Yannis Voisard (SUI)	Tudor Pro Cycling Team	+ 13"
4	Max Poole (GBR)	Team DSM	+ 16"
5	Sylvain Moniquet (BEL)	Lotto–Dstny	+ 18"
6	Oscar Onley (GBR)	Team DSM	+ 22"
7	Matteo Fabbro (ITA)	Bora–Hansgrohe	+ 22"
8	Egan Bernal (COL)	Ineos Grenadiers	+ 22"
9	Davide Piganzoli (ITA)	Eolo–Kometa	+ 45"
10	Abel Balderstone (ESP)	Caja Rural–Seguros RGA	+ 45"

=== Points classification ===
Final points classification (1–10)
Rank	Rider	Team	Points
1	Matúš Štoček (SVK)	ATT Investments	28
2	Marc Hirschi (SUI)	UAE Team Emirates	23
3	Dries De Bondt (BEL)	Alpecin–Deceuninck	22
4	Ben Tulett (GBR)	Ineos Grenadiers	21
5	Phil Bauhaus (GER)	Team Bahrain Victorious	20
6	Fabio Jakobsen (NED)	Soudal–Quick-Step	19
7	Yannis Voisard (SUI)	Tudor Pro Cycling Team	18
8	Sylvain Moniquet (BEL)	Lotto–Dstny	18
9	Thibau Nys (BEL)	Trek–Segafredo	17
10	Dylan Groenewegen (NED)	Team Jayco–AlUla	15

=== Mountains classification ===
Final mountains classification (1–10)
Rank	Rider	Team	Points
1	Sebastian Schönberger (AUT)	Human Powered Health	38
2	Filippo Ridolfo (ITA)	Team Novo Nordisk	28
3	Yves Lampaert (BEL)	Soudal–Quick-Step	22
4	Jasper De Buyst (BEL)	Lotto–Dstny	22
5	Dries De Bondt (BEL)	Alpecin–Deceuninck	18
6	Marc Hirschi (SUI)	UAE Team Emirates	16
7	Yannis Voisard (SUI)	Tudor Pro Cycling Team	15
8	Jarrad Drizners (AUS)	Lotto–Dstny	15
9	David Martín (ESP)	Eolo–Kometa	12
10	Matúš Štoček (SVK)	ATT Investments	11

=== Hungarian rider classification ===
Final Hungarian rider classification (1–10)
Rank	Rider	Team	Time
1	Márton Dina (HUN)	ATT Investments	17h 20' 39"
2	Péter Kusztor (HUN)	Team Novo Nordisk	+ 2' 24"
3	Márk Valent (HUN)	Epronex - Hungary Cycling Team	+ 28' 22"
4	Balázs Rózsa (HUN)	Epronex - Hungary Cycling Team	+ 29' 03"
5	Zoltán Antal Lepold (HUN)	Sofer–Savini Due–OMZ	+ 31' 29"
6	Gergely Szarka (HUN)	Epronex - Hungary Cycling Team	+ 32' 44"
7	Ádám Karl (HUN)	Epronex - Hungary Cycling Team	+ 34' 56"
8	Zétény Szijártó (HUN)	Hungary	+ 38' 34"
9	Viktor Filutás (HUN)	Hungary	+ 38' 35"
10	Ádám Pápai (HUN)	Hungary	+ 40' 02"

=== Team classification ===
Final team classification (1–10)
Rank	Team	Time
1	(United Kingdom) Ineos Grenadiers	52h 00' 30"
2	(Italy) Eolo–Kometa	+ 1' 33"
3	(Spain) Caja Rural–Seguros RGA	+ 3' 17"
4	(Czech Republic) ATT Investments	+ 4' 25"
5	(Switzerland) Tudor Pro Cycling Team	+ 4' 25"
6	(Australia) Team Jayco–AlUla	+ 4' 34"
7	(Belgium) Lotto–Dstny	+ 5' 07"
8	(Belgium) Soudal–Quick-Step	+ 5' 27"
9	Israel–Premier Tech	+ 6' 19"
10	(United States) Trek–Segafredo	+ 7' 38"

== UCI point ranking ==
The event is in class 2.Pro. It is open for riders of the ME category and U23 and in accordance with article 2.10.008 of the UCI regulations, points are awarded as follows for the UCI ranking:

Position	1.	2.	3.	4.	5.	6.	7.	8.	9.	10.	11.	12.	13.	14.	15.	16.-30.	31.-40.
General classification	200	150	125	100	85	70	60	50	40	35	30	25	20	15	10	5	3
Per stage	20	15	10	5	3
Leader	5

Classification
Position	Rider	Team	General	Stage	Leader	Total
1.	(Switzerland) Marc Hirschi	UAE Team Emirates	200	25		225
2.	(United Kingdom) Ben Tulett	Ineos Grenadiers	150	18	-	168
3.	(Switzerland) Yannis Voisard	Tudor Pro Cycling Team	125	20	-	145
4.	(United Kingdom) Max Poole	Team DSM	100	10	-	110
5.	(Belgium) Sylvain Moniquet	Lotto–Dstny	85	15	-	100
6.	(United Kingdom) Oscar Onley	Team DSM	70	3	-	73
7.	(Italy) Matteo Fabbro	Bora–Hansgrohe	60	-	-	60
8.	(Colombia) Egan Bernal	Ineos Grenadiers	50	-	-	50
9.	(Italy) Davide Piganzoli	Eolo–Kometa	40	-	-	40
10.	(Spain) Abel Balderstone	Caja Rural–Seguros RGA	35	-	-	35

== See also ==
- 2023 in men's road cycling
- 2023 in sports
