= 2003 Tour de Hongrie =

Race details
- Dates: 29 July – 3 August
- Stages: 6 + Prologue
- Distance: 780.7 km (485.1 mi)
- Winning time: 19h 57' 54"

Results
Jersey awarded to the overall winner	Winner	Zoltán Remák (SVK)	(P Nívó-Betonexpressz-FTC)
	Second	Matej Jurčo (SVK)	(Slovakia)
	Third	Kacper Sowiński (POL)	(Joko-Velamos)
Jersey awarded to the points classification winner	Points	Matej Jurčo (SVK)	(Slovakia)
Jersey awarded to the mountains classification winner	Mountains	Zoltán Remák (SVK)	(P Nívó-Betonexpressz-FTC)
	Team	P Nívó-Betonexpressz-FTC	

The 2003 Tour de Hongrie was the 30th edition of the Tour de Hongrie cycle race and was held from 29 July to 3 August 2003. The race started in Veszprém and finished in Budapest. The race was won by Zoltán Remák.

== General classification ==
Final general classification

Rank	Rider	Team	Time
1	Zoltán Remák (SVK)	P Nívó-Betonexpressz-FTC	19h 57' 54"
2	Matej Jurčo (SVK)	Slovakia	+ 1' 04"
3	Kacper Sowiński (POL)	Joko-Velamos	+ 3' 01"
