= 1964 Tour de Hongrie =

Race details
- Dates: 15–21 June
- Stages: 9
- Distance: 1,117 km (694.1 mi)
- Winning time: 28h 18' 20"

Results
Jersey awarded to the overall winner	Winner	Ferenc Stámusz (HUN)
	Second	Béla Juhász (HUN)
	Third	András Dévay (HUN)

The 1964 Tour de Hongrie was the 20th edition of the Tour de Hongrie cycle race and was held from 15 to 21 June 1964. The race started in Budapest and finished in Szombathely. The race was won by Ferenc Stámusz.

== General classification ==
Final general classification

Rank	Rider	Team	Time
1	Ferenc Stámusz (HUN)	Ú. Dózsa	28h 18' 20"
2	Béla Juhász (HUN)	Bp. Építők	+ 42"
3	András Dévay (HUN)	Pécsi Spartacus	+ 1' 19"
