= 1946–47 OB I bajnoksag season =

Hungarian ice hockey season

The 1946–47 OB I bajnokság season was the 10th season of the OB I bajnokság, the top level of ice hockey in Hungary. Five teams participated in the league, and MTK Budapest won the championship.

== Regular season ==
	Club	GP	W	T	L	Goals	Pts
1.	MTK Budapest	8	7	1	0	127:16	15
2.	Ferencvárosi TC	8	6	1	1		13
3.	Csepel Budapest	8	3	0	5		6
4.	Budapesti Postás	8	3	0	5	19:65	6
5.	MHC Budapest	8	0	0	8		0
