= 1927 Tour de Hongrie =

Race details
- Dates: 12–15 August
- Stages: 4
- Distance: 752 km (467.3 mi)
- Winning time: 30h 36' 17"

Results
	Winner	László Vida (HUN)
	Second	Dezső Huszka (HUN)
	Third	Károly Hugyecz (HUN)
	Team	Postás

The 1927 Tour de Hongrie was the third edition of the Tour de Hongrie cycle race and was held from 12 to 15 August 1927. The race started and finished in Budapest. The race was won by László Vida.

== Route ==
Stages of the 1927 Tour de Hongrie
Stage	Date	Route	Distance	Winner
1	12 August	Budapest to Pécs	256 km (159 mi)	
2	13 August	Pécs to Nagykanizsa	137 km (85 mi)	
3	14 August	Nagykanizsa to Pápa	184 km (114 mi)	
4	15 August	Pápa to Budapest	175 km (109 mi)	
Total			752 km (467 mi)	

== General classification ==
Final general classification

Rank	Rider	Team	Time
1	László Vida (HUN)	BSE	30h 36' 17"
2	Dezső Huszka (HUN)	Világosság KK	+ 19' 03"
3	Károly Hugyecz (HUN)	Postás	+ 28' 07"
