= Typographia =

Typographia may refer to:

- Typographia: an historical sketch of the origin and progress of the art of printing, 1825 book by Thomas Curson Hansard
- Typographia SC, defunct Hungarian football club
