= 1925 Tour de Hongrie =

Race details
- Dates: 27–29 June
- Stages: 3
- Distance: 510.5 km (317.2 mi)
- Winning time: 22h 10' 36"

Results
	Winner	Károly Jerzsabek (HUN)	(MTK)
	Second	Miklós Ladányi (HUN)	(MTK)
	Third	József Bouska II. (HUN)	(Jóbarát KK)

The 1925 Tour de Hongrie was the inaugural edition of the Tour de Hongrie cycle race and was held from 27 to 29 June 1925. The race started and finished in Budapest. The race was won by Károly Jerzsabek. The patron of the race was Miklós Horthy.

== Route ==
Stages of the 1925 Tour de Hongrie
Stage	Date	Route	Distance	Winner
1	27 June	Budapest to Szombathely	240 km (149 mi)	Károly Jerzsabek (HUN)
2	28 June	Szombathely to Győr	140.5 km (87 mi)	Ferenc Medgyes (HUN)
3	29 June	Győr to Budapest	130 km (81 mi)	Mihály Rusovszky (HUN)
Total			510.5 km (317 mi)	

== General classification ==
Final general classification (1–10)
Rank	Rider	Team	Time
1	Károly Jerzsabek (HUN)	MTK	22h 10' 36"
2	Miklós Ladányi (HUN)	MTK	+ 6' 05"
3	József Bouska II. (HUN)	Jóbarát KK	+ 20' 33"
4	Lajos Horváth (HUN)	Jóbarát KK	+ 23' 29"
5	Ferenc Medgyes (HUN)	Budapesti Postás SE	+ 28' 39"
6	Sebestyén Schmidt (HUN)	Világosság KK	+ 44' 03"
7	Ferenc Steiner (HUN)	Csillag KK	+ 1h 00' 46"
8	Gyula Kozdony (HUN)	Jóbarát KK	+ 1h 19' 20"
9	Mihály Prezsenszky (HUN)	MTK	+ 1h 37' 48"
10	Nándor Antal (HUN)	MTK	+ 1h 48' 51"
