= 1929 Tour de Hongrie =

Race details
- Dates: 27–30 June
- Stages: 4
- Distance: 611 km (379.7 mi)
- Winning time: 21h 31' 33"

Results
	Winner	Oskar Thierbach (GER)
	Second	Béla Jálics (HUN)
	Third	János Istenes (HUN)
	Team	Postás

The 1929 Tour de Hongrie was the fourth edition of the Tour de Hongrie cycle race and was held from 27 to 30 June 1929. The race started and finished in Budapest. The race was won by Oskar Thierbach.

== Route ==
Stages of the 1929 Tour de Hongrie
Stage	Date	Route	Distance	Winner
1	27 June	Budapest to Miskolc	186 km (116 mi)	Mihály Tetnovszky (HUN)
2	28 June	Miskolc to Miskolc	175 km (109 mi)	Kurt Hertwig (GER)
3	29 June	Miskolc to Gyöngyös	145 km (90 mi)	Vida II. (HUN)
4	30 June	Balassagyarmat to Budapest	105 km (65 mi)	Károly Szenes (HUN)
Total			611 km (380 mi)	

== General classification ==
Final general classification

Rank	Rider	Team	Time
1	Oskar Thierbach (GER)	Germany	21h 31' 33"
2	Béla Jálics (HUN)	Postás	+ 14' 20"
3	János Istenes (HUN)	UTE	+ 15' 40"
