= 1994 Tour de Hongrie =

Race details
- Dates: 25 July – 1 August
- Stages: 10
- Distance: 1,128 km (700.9 mi)
- Winning time: 26h 42' 33"

Results
Jersey awarded to the overall winner	Winner	Wolfgang Kotzmann (AUT)	(Austria)
	Second	Oleksandr Klymenko (UKR)	(Miskolci VSC)
	Third	Andreas Lauk (EST)	(Békéscsaba)
Jersey awarded to the points classification winner	Points	Danilo Hondo (GER)	(Cottbus)
Jersey awarded to the mountains classification winner	Mountains	Tadej Križnar (SLO)	(Krka Novo Mesto)
	Team	Krka Novo Mesto	

The 1994 Tour de Hongrie was the 23rd edition of the Tour de Hongrie cycle race and was held from 25 July to 1 August 1994. The race started and finished in Budapest. The race was won by Wolfgang Kotzmann.

== Route ==
Stages of the 1994 Tour de Hongrie
Stage	Date	Route	Distance	Type	Winner
1	25 July	Budapest to Győr	126 km (78 mi)	Plain stage	Guido Fulst (GER)
2	25 July	Győr to Sopron	50 km (31 mi)	Plain stage	Bogdan Bondariew (UKR)
3	26 July	Sopron to Nagykanizsa	166 km (103 mi)	Hilly stage	Roland Wafler (AUT)
4	27 July	Nagykanizsa to Pécs	142 km (88 mi)	Hilly stage	Ralf Koldewitz (GER)
5	28 July	Paks to Szolnok	150 km (93 mi)	Plain stage	Jens Lehmann (GER)
6	29 July	Szolnok to Békéscsaba	105 km (65 mi)	Plain stage	Robert Bartko (GER)
7	29 July	Berettyóújfalu to Nyíregyháza	85 km (53 mi)	Plain stage	Danilo Hondo (GER)
8	30 July	Nyíregyháza to Tokaj	28 km (17 mi)	Individual time trial	Wolfgang Kotzmann (AUT)
9	30 July	Tokaj to Eger	148 km (92 mi)	Intermediate stage	Bogdan Ravbar (SLO)
10	31 July	Miskolc to Budapest	178 km (111 mi)	Hilly stage	Bogdan Bondariew (UKR)
Total			1,128 km (701 mi)		

== General classification ==
Final general classification

Rank	Rider	Team	Time
1	Wolfgang Kotzmann (AUT)	Austria	26h 42' 33"
2	Oleksandr Klymenko (UKR)	Miskolci VSC	+ 1' 22"
3	Andreas Lauk (EST)	Békéscsaba	+ 1' 57"

== See also ==
- 1994 in sports
