= 1949–50 OB I bajnoksag season =

Hungarian ice hockey season

The 1949–50 OB I bajnokság season was the 13th season of the OB I bajnokság, the top level of ice hockey in Hungary. Four teams participated in the league and Meteor Mallerd won the championship.

== Regular season ==
	Club	GP	W	T	L	Goals	Pts
1.	Meteor Mallerd	6	5	1	0	32:15	11
2.	MTK Budapest	6	3	0	3	31:20	6
3.	Ferencvárosi TC	6	2	2	2	19:19	6
4.	Budapesti Postás	6	0	1	5	14:42	1

=== 2nd place game ===
- MTK Budapest - Ferencvárosi TC 5:3
