= 2006 Tour de Hongrie =

Race details
- Dates: 26–29 July
- Stages: 4
- Distance: 550.7 km (342.2 mi)
- Winning time: 14h 03' 54"

Results
Jersey awarded to the overall winner	Winner	Martin Riška (SVK)	(PSK Whirlpool-Hradec Králové)
	Second	Zoltán Remák (SVK)	(P-Nívó Betonexpressz 2000)
	Third	Csaba Szekeres (HUN)	(P-Nívó Betonexpressz 2000)
Jersey awarded to the points classification winner	Points	Martin Riška (SVK)	(PSK Whirlpool-Hradec Králové)
Jersey awarded to the mountains classification winner	Mountains	Radek Bečka (CZE)	(PSK Whirlpool-Hradec Králové)
	Team	P-Nívó Betonexpressz 2000	

The 2006 Tour de Hongrie was the 33rd edition of the Tour de Hongrie cycle race and was held from 26 to 29 July 2006. The race started in Miskolc and finished in Bükkszentkereszt. The race was won by Martin Riška.

== General classification ==
Final general classification

Rank	Rider	Team	Time
1	Martin Riška (SVK)	PSK Whirlpool-Hradec Králové	14h 03' 54"
2	Zoltán Remák (SVK)	P-Nívó Betonexpressz 2000	+ 25"
3	Csaba Szekeres (HUN)	P-Nívó Betonexpressz 2000	+ 3' 08"
