= 1907–08 Nemzeti Bajnokság I =

Nemzeti Bajnokság I
- Season: 1907–08
- Country: Hungary
- Champions: MTK

Statistics of Nemzeti Bajnokság I for the 1907–08 season.

== Overview ==
It was contested by 9 teams, and MTK Hungária FC won the championship.

== League standings ==
Pos	Team	Pld	W	D	L	GF	GA	GR	Pts
1	MTK Budapest FC	16	12	4	0	45	15	3.000	28
2	Ferencvárosi TC	16	11	3	2	62	27	2.296	25
3	Magyar AC	16	11	2	3	83	20	4.150	24
4	Újpest FC	16	8	2	6	20	27	0.741	18
5	Törekvés SE	16	6	2	8	25	47	0.532	14
6	Budapesti TC	16	5	3	8	48	27	1.778	13
7	Fővárosi TC	16	4	2	10	26	48	0.542	10
8	Budapesti AK	16	4	2	10	24	51	0.471	10
9	Typographia SC	16	1	0	15	11	82	0.134	2

Source: rsssf.com

== Results ==
Home \ Away	BAK	BTC	FTC	FŐV	MAC	MTK	TÖR	TYP	ÚJP
Budapesti AK		3–3	0–3	0–0	1–2	1–4	3–4	5–1	0–1
Budapesti TC	2–1		0–1	5–0	0–5	0–0	2–3	17–0	-:+ (Note: The match was settled with a goalless win.)
Ferencváros	4–1	2–2		10–4	1–7	3–3	2–2	9–1	6–0
Főváros	0–4	+:-	1–7		0–5	1–2	2–4	1–2	2–0
Magyar AC	16–0	4–3	2–4	2–2		1–3	3–1	5–2	1–0
MTK Budapest	7–0	4–3	4–2	+:-	1–1		5–1	5–0	2–0
Törekvés	0–1	3–2	0–6	2–6	0–8	1–4		1–0	1–1
Typographia	1–3	1–3	-:+	1–5	0–20	-:+	0–2		2–4
Újpest	3–1	0–6	0–2	4–2	2–1	1–1	2–0	2–0	

Source: rsssf.com
Legend: Blue = home team win; Yellow = draw; Red = away team win.
