= 1906–07 Nemzeti Bajnokság I =

Nemzeti Bajnokság I
- Season: 1906–07
- Country: Hungary
- Champions: Ferencvárosi TC

The 1906–07 Nemzeti Bajnokság I was contested by 8 teams, and Ferencvárosi TC won the championship.

== League standings ==
Pos	Team	Pld	W	D	L	GF	GA	GR	Pts
1	Ferencvárosi TC	14	11	2	1	70	20	3.500	24
2	Magyar AC	14	10	2	2	78	15	5.200	22
3	MTK Budapest FC	14	10	2	2	67	18	3.722	22
4	Budapesti AK	14	6	2	6	32	44	0.727	14
5	Typographia SC	14	3	3	8	25	62	0.403	9
6	Újpest FC	14	2	4	8	16	38	0.421	8
7	Fővárosi TC	14	2	3	9	16	55	0.291	7
8	33 FC	14	2	2	10	20	72	0.278	6

Source: rsssf.com

== Results ==
Home \ Away	33F	BAK	FTC	FŐV	MAC	MTK	TYP	ÚJP
33 FC		3–7	2–9	2–0	1–14	1–11	1–3	2–2
Budapesti AK	2–1		4–3	2–0	0–8	2–2	1–4	1–3
Ferencváros	7–1	3–2		6–2	3–2	2–0	15–0	2–0
Főváros	3–4	1–1	1–7		0–9	0–9	4–3	1–1
Magyar AC	6–0	2–0	3–3	4–1		1–3	2–2	3–1
MTK Budapest	6–1	9–2	2–2	5–0	1–3		7–2	6–1
Typographia	1–1	2–4	1–3	1–2	0–14	1–5		2–2
Újpest	1–0	3–4	0–5	1–1	0–7	0–1	1–3	

Source: rsssf.com
Legend: Blue = home team win; Yellow = draw; Red = away team win.
