= Jakob Söderqvist =

Swedish cyclist (born 2003)

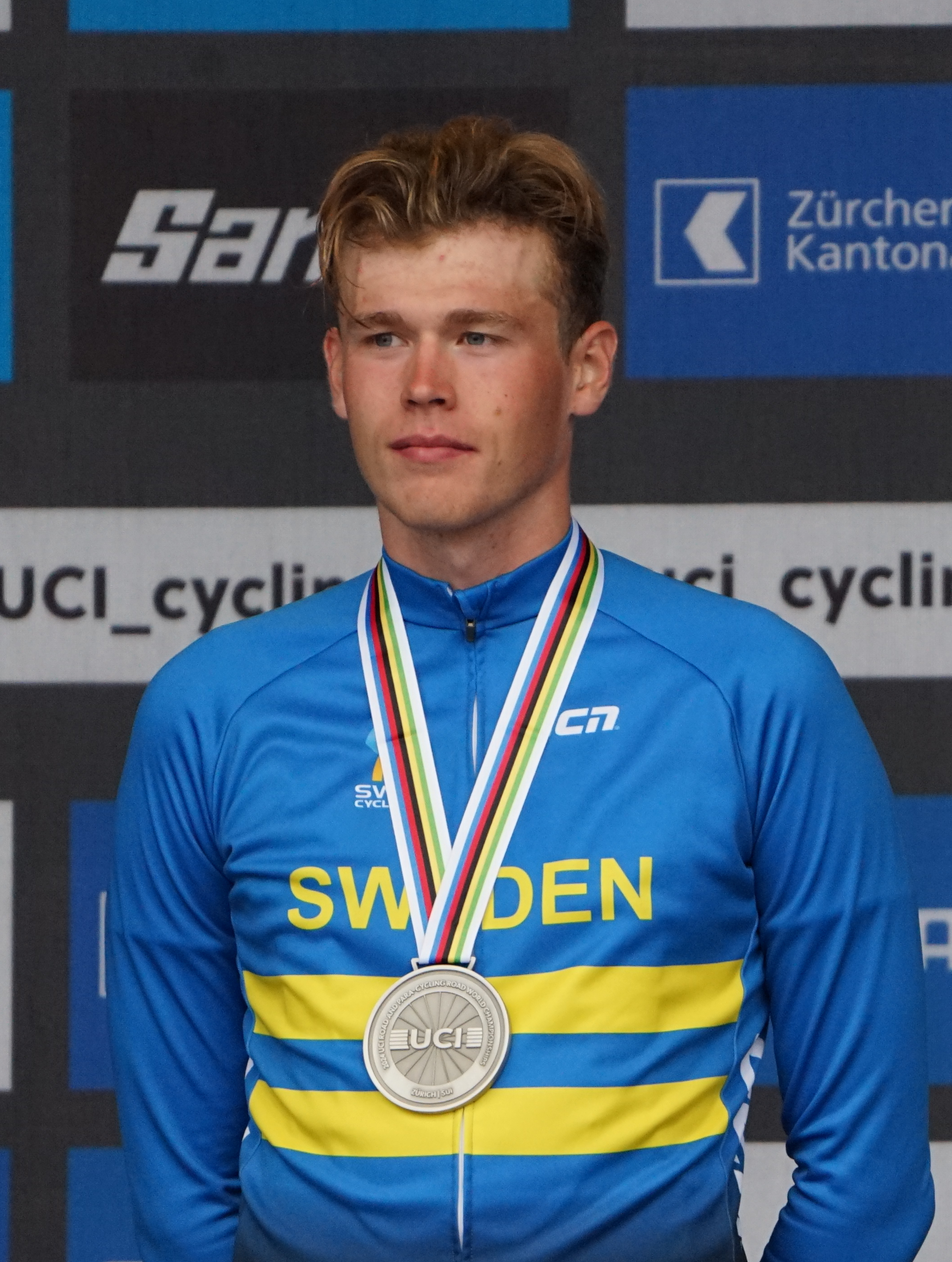
- Söderqvist in 2024

Personal information
- Born: 31 May 2003 (age 23) Sundsvall, Sweden
- Height: 1.87 m (6 ft 2 in)
- Weight: 83 kg (183 lb)

Cycling career
- Sport: Cycling
- Current team: Lidl–Trek
- Disciplines: Road; Mountain biking
- Role: Rider
- Rider type: Time trialist

Amateur team
- 2021–2023: Svealand Cycling Team

Professional teams
- 2024–2025: Lidl–Trek Future Racing
- 2026–: Lidl–Trek

Major wins
- Stage races Tour de Hongrie (2026) One-day races and Classics National Time Trial Championships (2024, 2025, 2026)
Medal record
Men's road cycling
Representing Sweden
World Championships
Gold medal – first place	2025 Kigali	Under-23 time trial
Silver medal – second place	2024 Zurich	Under-23 time trial
European Championships
Silver medal – second place	2024 Limburg	Under-23 time trial

Jakob Söderqvist (born 31 May 2003) is a Swedish professional cyclist who rides for UCI WorldTeam Lidl–Trek.

== Career ==
In April 2025, Lidl–Trek announced that Söderqvist would join its UCI WorldTeam squad for the 2026 season, having been promoted from the development team Lidl–Trek Future Racing.

== Major results ==
=== Road ===
2020
3rd Time trial, National Junior Championships
2023
National Under-23 Championships

1st Time trial
3rd Road race

1st Overall Flanders Tomorrow Tour
1st Stage 3 Tour du Loir-et-Cher
2nd Time trial, National Championships
7th Time trial, UCI World Under-23 Championships
10th Time trial, UEC European Under-23 Championships
2024 (1 pro win)
1st Time trial, National Championships
1st Overall Tour de Bretagne

1st Stage 3

Flèche du Sud

1st Stages 4 (ITT) & 5

1st Chrono des Nations Under-23
1st Stage 1 (ITT) Giro Next Gen
2nd Time trial, UCI World Under-23 Championships
2nd Time trial, UEC European Under-23 Championships
7th Overall Tour du Loir-et-Cher
8th Overall Tour de la Provence
2025 (2)
1st Time trial, UCI World Under-23 Championships
1st Time trial, National Championships
1st Stage 1 (TTT) Volta a la Comunitat Valenciana
2nd Overall Danmark Rundt

1st Young rider classification
1st Stage 3 (ITT)

2nd Paris–Roubaix Espoirs
3rd Overall Tour of Holland
2026 (5)
1st Time trial, National Championships
1st Overall Tour de Hongrie

1st Stage 4

Eneco Tour

1st Prologue & Stage 2 (ITT)

5th Time trial, UCI World Championships
8th Time trial, UEC European Championships

=== Mountain bike ===
2020
1st Junior Lythrodontas
2021
1st Cross-country, National Junior Championships
2nd Junior Jönköping
2022
2nd Marathon, National Championships
2nd Vardø
2023
3rd Salamina Epic Race II
