= 1995 Tour de Hongrie =

Race details
- Dates: 24–30 July
- Stages: 8
- Distance: 1,083.2 km (673.1 mi)
- Winning time: 25h 13' 18"

Results
Jersey awarded to the overall winner	Winner	Sergei Ivanov (RUS)	(Lada-Samara)
	Second	Alekszandr Kavecki (BLR)	(MTZ)
	Third	Jens Dittmann (GER)	(TSV Erfurt)
Jersey awarded to the points classification winner	Points	Jarosław Michalec (POL)	(Krakków)
Jersey awarded to the mountains classification winner	Mountains	Sergei Ivanov (RUS)	(Lada-Samara)
	Team	Lada-Samara	

The 1995 Tour de Hongrie was the 24th edition of the Tour de Hongrie cycle race and was held from 24 to 30 July 1995. The race started and finished in Budapest. The race was won by Sergei Ivanov.

== General classification ==
Final general classification

Rank	Rider	Team	Time
1	Sergei Ivanov (RUS)	Lada-Samara	25h 13' 18"
2	Alekszandr Kavecki (UKR)	MTZ	+ 1' 22"
3	Jens Dittmann (GER)	TSV Erfurt	+ 1' 57"
