= 1953 Tour de Hongrie =

Race details
- Dates: 6–10 September
- Stages: 5
- Distance: 921 km (572.3 mi)
- Winning time: 26h 40' 41"

Results
	Winner	József Kis-Dala (HUN)
	Second	Béla Bartusek (HUN)
	Third	Márton Bencze (HUN)
	Team	Dózsa I.

The 1953 Tour de Hongrie was the 15th edition of the Tour de Hongrie cycle race and was held from 6 to 10 September 1953. The race started and finished in Budapest. The race was won by József Kis-Dala.

== Route ==
Stages of the 1953 Tour de Hongrie
Stage	Date	Route	Distance	Winner
1	6 September	Budapest to Szombathely	225 km (140 mi)	Zoltán Sipos (HUN)
2	7 September	Szombathely to Keszthely	133 km (83 mi)	Béla Bartusek (HUN)
3	8 September	Keszthely to Keszthely	199 km (124 mi)	Béla Bartusek (HUN)
4	9 September	Keszthely to Pécs	168 km (104 mi)	Béla Bartusek (HUN)
5	10 September	Pécs to Budapest	196 km (122 mi)	László Simó (HUN)
Total			921 km (572 mi)	

== General classification ==
Final general classification

Rank	Rider	Team	Time
1	József Kis-Dala (HUN)	Dózsa	26h 40' 41"
2	Béla Bartusek (HUN)	Honvéd	+ 9' 26"
3	Márton Bencze (HUN)	Vörös Lobogó	+ 11' 36"
