= 1926 Tour de Hongrie =

Race details
- Dates: 27–29 June
- Stages: 3
- Distance: 554 km (344.2 mi)
- Winning time: 20h 05' 25"

Results
	Winner	László Vida (HUN)
	Second	Károly Hölcz (HUN)
	Third	Bouska I. (HUN)

The 1926 Tour de Hongrie was the second edition of the Tour de Hongrie cycle race and was held from 27 to 29 June 1926. The race started and finished in Budapest. The race was won by László Vida.

== Route ==
Stages of the 1926 Tour de Hongrie
Stage	Date	Route	Distance	Winner
1	27 June	Budapest to Debrecen	221 km (137 mi)	
2	28 June	Debrecen to Miskolc	142 km (88 mi)	
3	29 June	Miskolc to Budapest	191 km (119 mi)	
Total			554 km (344 mi)	

== General classification ==
Final general classification

Rank	Rider	Team	Time
1	László Vida (HUN)	BTC	20h 05' 25"
2	Károly Hölcz (HUN)	Világosság KK	+ 13' 25"
3	Bouska I. (HUN)	JKK	+ 13' 54"
