= 2007 Tour de Hongrie =

Race details
- Dates: 24–28 July
- Stages: 6
- Distance: 823.6 km (511.8 mi)
- Winning time: 20h 17' 19"

Results
Jersey awarded to the overall winner	Winner	Andrew Bradley (AUT)	(Swiag)
	Second	Miroslav Keliar (SVK)	(Podbrezová)
	Third	Stefan Pöll (AUT)	(Denzel Cliff)
Jersey awarded to the points classification winner	Points	Andrew Bradley (AUT)	(Swiag)
Jersey awarded to the mountains classification winner	Mountains	Martin Riška (SVK)	(Swiag)
	Team	Swiag	

The 2007 Tour de Hongrie was the 34th edition of the Tour de Hongrie cycle race and was held from 24 to 28 July 2007. The race started in Gyömrő and finished in Miskolc. The race was won by Andrew Bradley.

== General classification ==
Final general classification

Rank	Rider	Team	Time
1	Andrew Bradley (AUT)	Swiag	20h 17' 19"
2	Miroslav Keliar (SVK)	Podbrezová	+ 3' 00"
3	Stefan Pöll (AUT)	Denzel Cliff	+ 3' 06"
