= 2001 Tour de Hongrie =

Race details
- Dates: 8–12 August
- Stages: 4 + Prologue
- Distance: 584.6 km (363.3 mi)
- Winning time: 14h 26' 18"

Results
Jersey awarded to the overall winner	Winner	Mikoš Rnjaković (FRY)	(Spartak Subotica)
	Second	Róbert Nagy (SVK)	(Cornix-Invest Pécs)
	Third	Roman Broniš (SVK)	(Podbrezová)
Jersey awarded to the points classification winner	Points	Zoltán Bebtó (HUN)	(Colombina-FTC-Eurent)
Jersey awarded to the mountains classification winner	Mountains	Róbert Nagy (SVK)	(Cornix-Invest Pécs)
	Team	Podbrezová	

The 2001 Tour de Hongrie was the 28th edition of the Tour de Hongrie cycle race and was held from 8 to 12 August 2001. The race started in Veszprém and finished in Budapest. The race was won by Mikoš Rnjaković.

== General classification ==
Final general classification

Rank	Rider	Team	Time
1	Mikoš Rnjaković (FRY)	Spartak Subotica	14h 26' 18"
2	Róbert Nagy (SVK)	Cornix-Invest Pécs	+ 23"
3	Roman Broniš (SVK)	Podbrezová	+ 23"
