= 2004 Tour de Hongrie =

Race details
- Dates: 26 July – 1 August
- Stages: 6 + Prologue
- Distance: 840 km (522.0 mi)
- Winning time: 20h 03' 26"

Results
Jersey awarded to the overall winner	Winner	Zoltán Remák (SVK)	(Podbrezová)
	Second	Phillip Thuaux (AUS)	(Cyclingnews.com)
	Third	Martin Prázdnovský (SVK)	(Podbrezová)
Jersey awarded to the points classification winner	Points	Martin Prázdnovský (SVK)	(Podbrezová)
Jersey awarded to the mountains classification winner	Mountains	László Garamszegi (HUN)	(P Nívó-Betonexpressz-FTC)
	Team	Podbrezová	

The 2004 Tour de Hongrie was the 31st edition of the Tour de Hongrie cycle race and was held from 26 July to 1 August 2004. The race started in Veszprém and finished in Budapest. The race was won by Zoltán Remák.

== General classification ==
Final general classification

Rank	Rider	Team	Time
1	Zoltán Remák (SVK)	Podbrezová	20h 03' 26"
2	Phillip Thuaux (AUS)	Cyclingnews.com	+ 2' 06"
3	Martin Prázdnovský (SVK)	Podbrezová	+ 2' 23"
