= Mikoš Rnjaković =

Serbian cyclist (born 1964)

Personal information
- Born: 20 April 1964 (age 62) Užička Požega, SR Serbia, SFR Yugoslavia

Cycling career
- Sport: Cycling
- Current team: Retired
- Discipline: Road
- Role: Rider

Professional team
- 1997: Kross–Montanari–Selle Italia

Mikoš Rnjaković (Serbian Cyrillic: Микош Рњаковић; born 20 April 1964) is a Serbian former cyclist. He competed in two events at the 1992 Summer Olympics as an Independent Olympic Participant. He won the Tour de Hongrie in 2001.

== Major results ==
1985
1st Overall Tour de Serbie
1990
1st Overall Tour de Serbie
1st Stage 10 Settimana Ciclistica Lombarda
1991
1st Overall Tour de Serbie
1996
1st Overall Tour de Serbie
1999
5th Overall Tour de Danube

1st Prologue

2000
1st Stage 3 Tour of Yugoslavia
6th Overall International Tour of Rhodes
2001
1st Overall Tour de Hongrie
1st Stage 3 Tour d'Egypte
