= László Mahó =

Hungarian cyclist

Personal information
- Born: 10 March 1941 Budapest, Hungary
- Died: 3 June 2006 (aged 65)

Cycling career
- Sport: Cycling

László Mahó (10 March 1941 – 3 June 2006) was a Hungarian cyclist. He competed in the individual road race and team time trial events at the 1964 Summer Olympics. He won the Tour de Hongrie in 1965.
