= Antal Megyerdi =

Hungarian cyclist

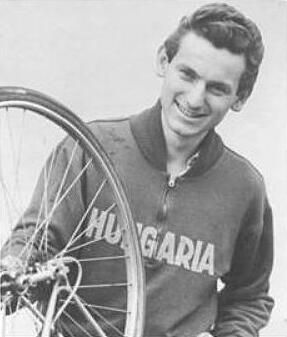
- Antal Megyerdi in 1960

Personal information
- Born: 5 December 1939 Budapest, Hungary
- Died: 10 March 2013 (aged 73) Budapest, Hungary
- Height: 1.69 m (5 ft 7 in)
- Weight: 65 kg (143 lb)

Cycling career
- Sport: Cycling

Antal Megyerdi (5 December 1939 – 10 March 2013) was a Hungarian cyclist. He was born in Budapest, his profession was a Publisher. He competed at the 1964 Summer Olympics in the individual road race and finished in 47th place. In 1960 he won the Tour de Slovaquie, and in 1966 one stage of the Peace Race.
