= András Mészáros (cyclist) =

Hungarian cyclist

Personal information
- Born: 12 April 1941 (age 85) Szentes, Hungary

Cycling career
- Sport: Cycling

András Mészáros (born 12 April 1941) is a Hungarian former cyclist. He competed at the 1964 Summer Olympics and the 1968 Summer Olympics. He won the 1963 edition of the Tour de Hongrie.
