= Jens Reynders =

Belgian cyclist (born 1998)

Personal information
- Born: 25 May 1998 (age 28) Tongeren, Belgium
- Height: 1.84 m (6 ft 0 in)
- Weight: 76 kg (168 lb)

Cycling career
- Sport: Cycling
- Current team: Wagner Bazin WB
- Disciplines: Road; Track
- Role: Rider

Amateur team
- 2016: Verandas Willems–Crabbé Toitures–CC Chevigny

Professional teams
- 2017–2018: Leopard Pro Cycling
- 2019: Wallonie–Bruxelles Development Team
- 2020: Hagens Berman Axeon
- 2021–2022: Sport Vlaanderen–Baloise
- 2023: Israel–Premier Tech
- 2024: Bingoal WB Devo Team
- 2025–: Wagner Bazin WB

Jens Reynders (born 25 May 1998) is a Belgian racing cyclist, who currently rides for UCI ProTeam Wagner Bazin WB.

== Major results ==
2015
1st Stage 2a (TTT) Aubel–Thimister–La Gleize
2017
7th Antwerpse Havenpijl
2018
1st Grand Prix OST Manufaktur
2nd Road race, National Under-23 Road Championships
5th PWZ Zuidenveld Tour
8th Grand Prix Albert Fauville-Baulet
2019
1st Grand Prix de la ville de Pérenchies
3rd Paris–Roubaix Espoirs
3rd Ghent–Wevelgem U23
2021
1st GP Beeckman-De Caluwé
5th Egmont Cycling Race
5th Grote Prijs Marcel Kint
7th Route Adélie
9th Grote Prijs Jef Scherens
2022
4th Antwerp Port Epic
2023
8th Heistse Pijl
2024
5th SD WORX BW Classic
6th Le Samyn
2025
10th Antwerp Port Epic
