= Ferenc Stámusz =

Hungarian cyclist (1934–2022)

Personal information
- Born: 21 August 1934 Budapest, Hungary
- Died: 27 August 2022 (aged 88) Budapest, Hungary

Cycling career
- Sport: Cycling

Ferenc Stámusz (21 August 1934 – 27 August 2022) was a Hungarian cyclist. He competed at the 1960 Summer Olympics and the 1964 Summer Olympics. He won the Tour de Hongrie in 1964.
