= Győző Török =

Hungarian cyclist

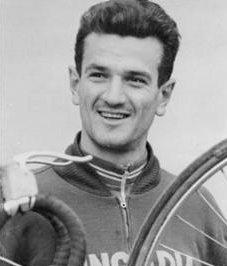
- Győző Török in 1960

Personal information
- Born: 22 May 1935 Miskolc, Hungary
- Died: 11 April 1987 (aged 51)
- Height: 1.80 m (5 ft 11 in)
- Weight: 68 kg (150 lb)

Cycling career
- Sport: Cycling

Győző Török (22 May 1935 – 11 April 1987) was a Hungarian cyclist. Török was born in Budapest, and as officially being an employee of the Hungarian Railways, he started racing for their cycling team. He competed in the road race at the 1960 Summer Olympics, but failed to finish. He won the Tour de Hongrie in 1955 and 1956. He committed suicide on 11 April 1987.
