= Kurt Stettler (cyclist) =

Swiss cyclist

Personal information
- Born: 11 April 1910
- Died: 1 December 1974 (aged 64)

Cycling career
- Sport: Cycling
- Discipline: Road
- Role: Rider

Kurt Stettler (11 April 1910 – 1 December 1974) was a Swiss racing cyclist. He rode in the 1934 and 1935 Tour de France.
