= Károly Eisenkrammer =

Hungarian cyclist

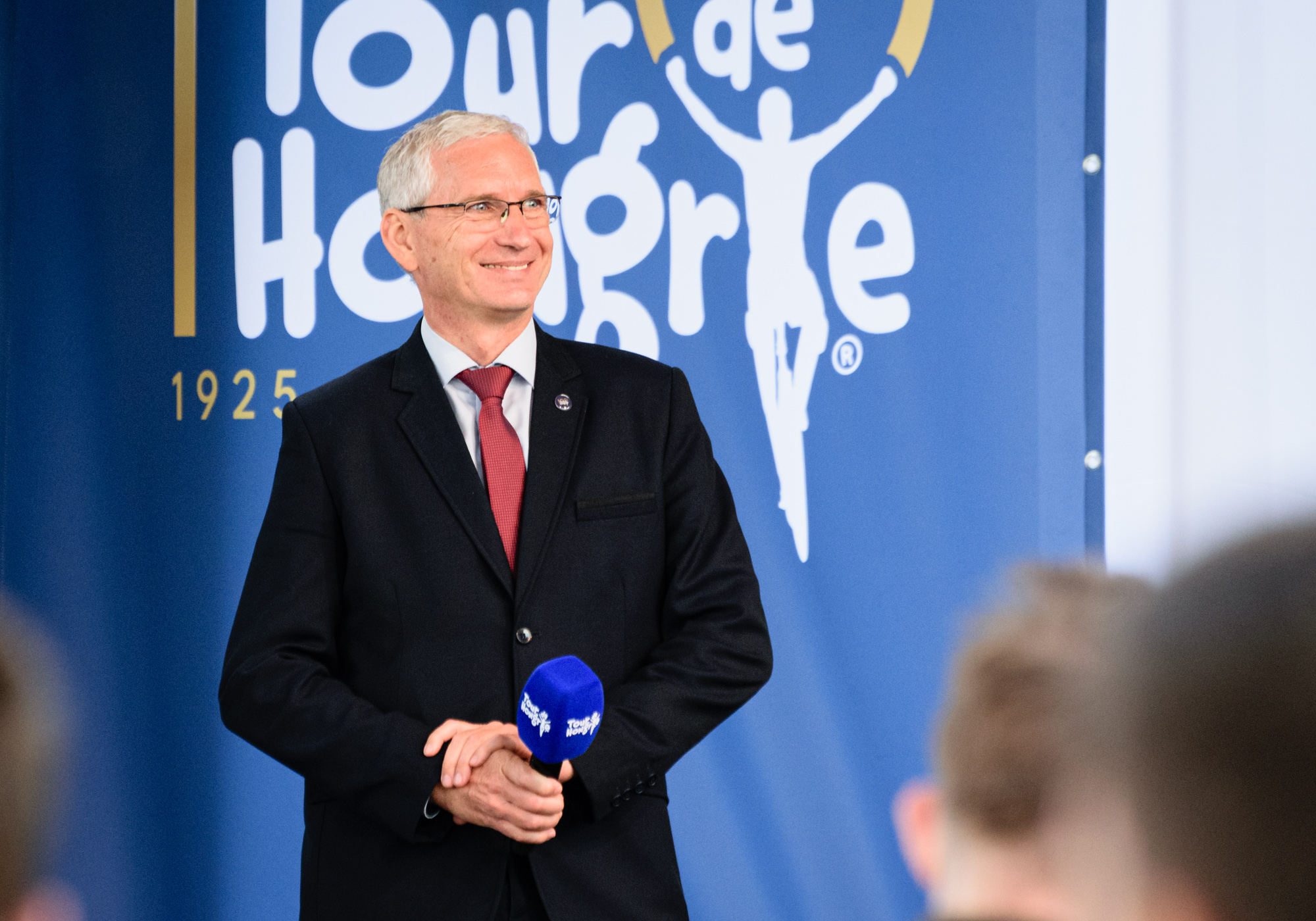
- Károly Eisenkrammer in 2025

Personal information
- Born: 4 January 1969 (age 57) Budapest, Hungary

Cycling career
- Sport: Cycling

Károly Eisenkrammer (born 4 January 1969) is a Hungarian former cyclist. He competed in the individual road race at the 1992 Summer Olympics. He is the general director and organizer of the professional, UCI ProSeries road bicycle race Tour de Hongrie.
