= André Labeylie =

French cyclist

Personal information
- Born: 30 January 1926
- Died: 31 July 1998 (aged 72)

Cycling career
- Sport: Cycling
- Role: Rider

André Labeylie (30 January 1926 – 31 July 1998) was a French racing cyclist. He rode in the 1951 Tour de France.
