= János Juszkó =

Hungarian cyclist (1939–2018)

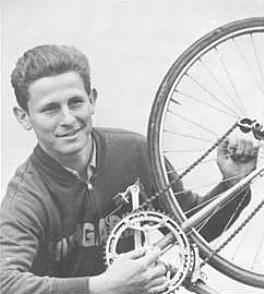
- János Juszkó in 1960

Personal information
- Born: 9 June 1939 Szeged, Hungary
- Died: 2 May 2018 (aged 78) Szeged, Hungary
- Height: 1.81 m (5 ft 11 in)
- Weight: 78 kg (172 lb)

Cycling career
- Sport: Cycling

János Juszkó (9 June 1939 – 2 May 2018) was a Hungarian cyclist. Juszko was born in Budapest, his profession was a Toolmaker. He competed at the 1964 Summer Olympics in the individual road race and the 100 km team time trial and finished in 24th and 12th place, respectively.

He took part in eight Peace Races and won one stage in 1966. In 1964 and 1965 he was chosen Hungarian road cyclist of the year. He retired in 1973 and later worked as a cycling coach and a teacher of physical education.
