= Zoltán Remák =

Slovak cyclist

Personal information
- Born: 15 January 1977 (age 49) Košice, Czechoslovakia

Cycling career
- Sport: Cycling
- Current team: Retired
- Discipline: Road
- Role: Rider

Professional teams
- 2005: CK ŽP Šport AS Podbrezová
- 2006–2007: P-Nívó Betonexpressz 2000 Kft.se

Zoltán Remák (born 15 January 1977 in Košice) is a Slovak former cyclist of Hungarian nationality.

== Major results ==
2003
1st Overall Tour de Hongrie

1st Stage 1

2004
1st Overall Grand Prix Cycliste de Gemenc
1st Overall Tour de Hongrie
2005
1st Prologue Tour de Hongrie
5th Overall Paths of King Nikola
2006
2nd National Road Race Championships
2nd National Time Trial Championships
2nd Overall Tour de Hongrie
2nd Tour of Vojvodina I
2007
1st Overall Tour of Szeklerland

1st Stage 1

1st Overall International Paths of Victory Tour

1st Stage 4
