= Typographia SC =

Hungarian football club

- Full name: Typographia Sport Club
- Founded: 1903
- Ground: Kolozsvári Tamás street
- Capacity: 1,000
Home colours

Typographia Sport Club was a Hungarian football club from the town of Budapest.

== History ==
Typographia SC was established in 1903.

Typographia SC debuted in the 1906–07 season of the Hungarian League and finished fifth.

== Name Changes ==
- 1903–1909: Typographia Sport Club
- 1909: dissolved
- ?-1934: Typographia FC
- 1934–1944: Typographia Nyomda Torna Egylet
- 1944–1945: Nyomdász NSE
- 1945–1950: Typographia Nyomda Torna Egylet
- 1948: merger with Compactor SC
- 1950: merger with Állami Nyomda
- 1950–1951: Tipográfia Állami Nyomda
- 1951: merger with Kőbányai Lombikba
- 1951–1952: Állami Nyomda SK
- 1952–1953: Szikra Állami Nyomda
- 1953: merger with Óbudai Szikrával
- 1953–1954: Budai Szikra
- 1954–1957: Szikra Állami Nyomda
- 1957: exit from Budapesti Szikrából
- 1957–?: Typographia TE

== Seasons ==
The table below shows the seasons of Typographia TE.

Season	Tier	Club's name	Position	Pts
1904	2	Typographia SC	4 / 7	10
1905	2	Typographia SC	2 / 9	22
1906	1	Typographia SC	8 / 9	4
1906–07	1	Typographia SC	5 / 8	9
1907–08	1	Typographia SC	9 / 9	2
1908–09	1	Typographia SC	9 / 9	2
1935–36	6	Typográfia TE	5 / 11	25
1936–37	5	Tipográfia NyTE	1 / 12	41
1937–38	4	Typográfia TE	4 / 14	34
1938–39	5	Tipográfia	1 / 14	37
1939–40	4	Tipográfia NyTE	2 / 14	37
1940–41	4	Tipográfia NyTE	11 / 13	17
1941–42	4	Tipográfia	11 / 14	16
1942–43	4	Tipográfia	12 / 14	17
1943–44	4	Nyomdász NSE	4 / 14	37
1944–45	3	Nyomdász SE	3 / 14	9
1945	2	Tipográfia NyTE	4 / 12	26
1945–46	2	Tipográfia NyTE	9 / 14	16
1946–47	3	Tipográfia NyTE	7 / 14	28
1947–48	3	Tipográfia NyTE	7 / 16	30
1948–49	3	Tipográfia NyTE	14 / 18	26
1949–50	3	Tipográfia NyTE	12 / 16	27
1950	3	Tipográfia Állami Nyomda	14 / 16	9
1951	3	Állami Nyomda	8 / 12	19
1952	3	Szikra Állami Nyomda	4 / 14	32
1953	3	Budai Szikra	3 / 16	36
1954	3	Állami Nyomda	16 / 16	10
1955	4	Állami Nyomda	3 / 16	44
1956	4	Állami Nyomda	14 / 16	
1957–58	4	Tipográfia TE	16 / 20	23
1958–59	4	Tipográfia	9 / 16	29
1959–60	4	Tipográfia	14 / 16	18
1960–61	4	Tipográfia	15 / 16	22
1961–62	5	Tipográfia	14 / 16	20
1962–63	5	Tipográfia TE	14 / 16	23
1963	6	Tipográfia TE	8 / 16	14
1964	6	Tipográfia	4 / 16	39
1965	6	Tipográfia	9 / 14	26
1966	6	Tipográfia TE	6 / 14	30
1967	6	Tipográfia TE	2 / 14	35
1968	6	Tipográfia TE	12 / 16	24
1969	6	Tipográfia	8 / 16	29
1970	6	Tipográfia	7 / 16	16
1970–71	6	Tipográfia	11 / 16	24
1971–72	6	Tipográfia TE	12 / 16	27
1972–73	6	Tipográfia	14 / 16	17
1973–74	6	Tipográfia	8 / 16	19
1974–75	6	Tipográfia TE	0 / 16	
1977–78	7	Tipográfia TE	5 / 16	32
1978–79	6	Tipográfia TE	3 / 16	36
1979–80	5	Tipográfia-Zrínyi TE	14 / 16	21
1980–81	5	Tipográfia	13 / 16	14
1981–82	6	Tipográfia	10 / 16	27
1990–91	6	Tipográfia TE	16 / 16	
