= Austrian Cycling Federation =

National governing body of cycle racing in Austria

- Österreichischer Radsport-Verband
- Sport: Cycle racing
- Jurisdiction: National
- Membership: 416
- Abbreviation: ÖRV
- Founded: 1973
- Affiliation: UCI
- Regional affiliation: UEC
- President: Harald J. Mayer

Official website
- www.radsportverband.at
- (Austria)

The Austrian Cycling Federation or ÖRV (in German: Österreichischer Radsport-Verband), also known as Cycling Austria, is the national governing body of cycle racing in Austria. It is a member of the UCI and the UEC.

As of 2023, it has a total membership of 48,672 individuals and 416 regional bodies.
