= István Liszkay =

Hungarian cyclist

Personal information
- Born: 30 November 1912 Budapest, Austria-Hungary
- Died: 29 November 2005 (aged 92)

Cycling career
- Sport: Cycling

István Liszkay (30 November 1912 – 29 November 2005) was a Hungarian cyclist. He competed in three events at the 1936 Summer Olympics.
