= Hungarian Cycling Federation =

National governing body of cycle racing in Hungary

MKSZ logo

The Hungarian Cycling Federation or MKSZ (in Hungarian: Magyar Kerékpáros Szövetség, pronounced [ˈmɒɟɒr ˈkɛreːkpaːroʃ ˈsøvɛt͡ʃːeːɡ]) is the national governing body of cycle racing in Hungary. It was established on 3 May 1894 by 6 clubs: Budai Kerékpár Egyesület, Budapesti Kerékpár Egyesület, Budapesti Torna Klub, Hunnia Bicycle Club, Magyar Testgyakorlók Köre, Nemzeti Kerékpár Egyesület.

The MKSZ is a member of the UCI and the UEC.

== Events ==
The federation organizes following cycling events every year, which are part of UCI Europe Tour:

- Tour de Hongrie (2.1)

as well as

- Hungarian National Road Race Championships
- Hungarian National Time Trial Championships

Other events are:

- Tour de Ajka
- Tour de Velencei-tó
- Balmaz Nagydíj
