= Budapesti Postás SE =

Hungarian football club

- Full name: Budapesti Postás Sport Egyesület
- Founded: 1899
- Dissolved: 1986 (football)
- Ground: Róna utcai Sportpálya
- Capacity: 5,500
Home colours	Away colours

Budapesti Postás SE is a Hungarian football club from the town of Zugló, Budapest.

== History ==
Budapesti Postás SE debuted in the 1903 season of the Hungarian League and finished fourth.

== Name Changes ==
- 1899–1901: Budapesti Posta és Távirda Tisztviselők Sport Egyesülete
- 1901–1917: Postások Sport Egyesülete
- 1906: football department was dissolved
- 1908: football department was founded again
- 1917–1918: Postás Sport Egyesület
- 1918–1919: Postások Sport Clubja
- 1919–1950: Postás Sport Egyesület
- 1950: merger with Szentlőrinci AC
- 1950–1954: Budapesti Postás SK
- 1954: Budapesti Törekvés SE (merger with BKV Előre SC and Budapesti Lokomotív)
- 1956: divided into Postás SE, BKV Előre SC, BVSC Budapest and Szentlőrinci AC
- 1956–present: Postás SE

== Honours ==
=== Domestic ===
- Nemzeti Bajnokság II
  - Winners (2): 1902, 1951

== Managers ==
- (Hungary) Lajos Baróti (1952–53)
