= Hungarian National Road Race Championships =

National road cycling championship in Hungary

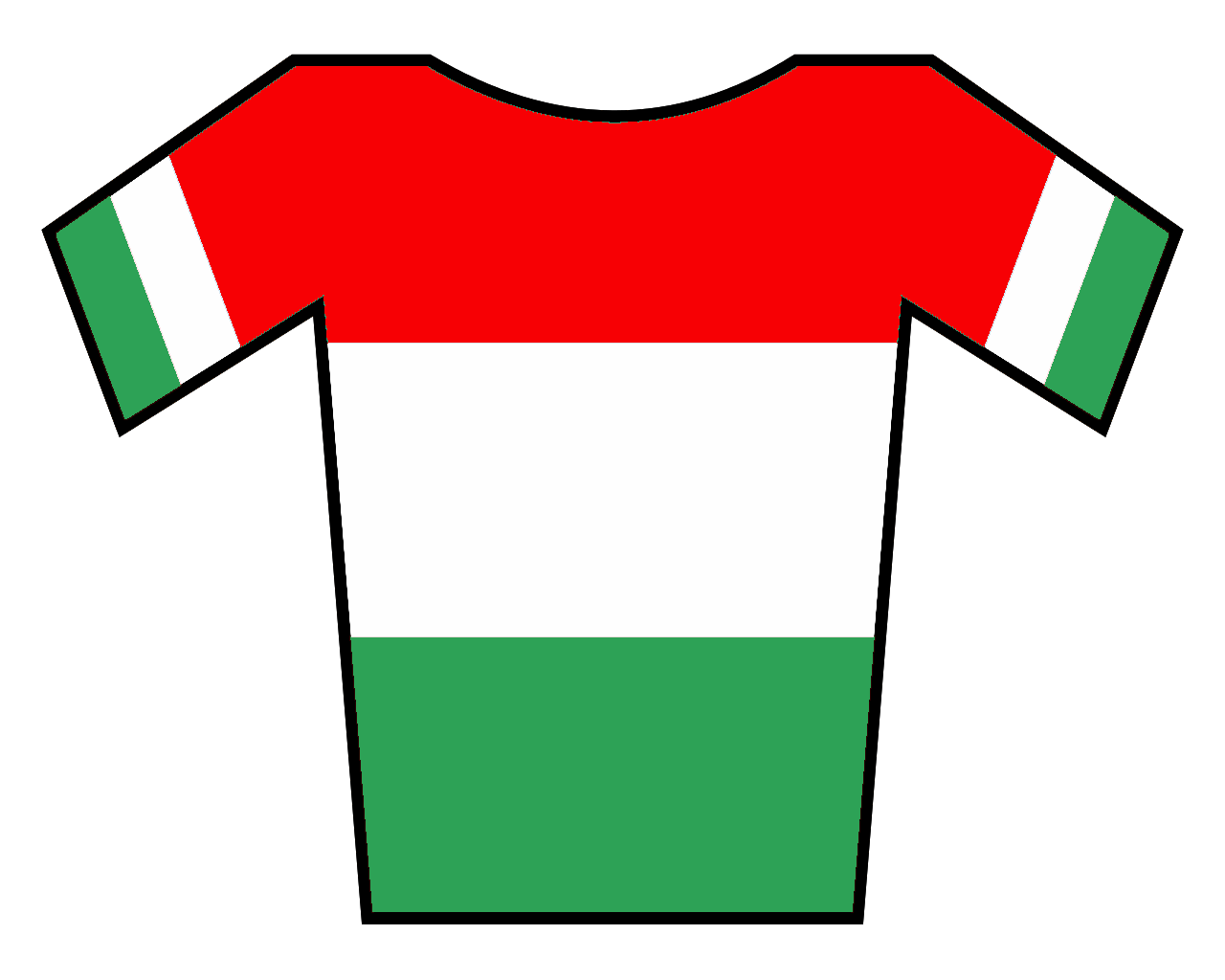
The Champion's Jersey

The Hungarian National Road Race Championships are organized annually by the Hungarian Cycling Federation to decide the champions in the road race discipline, across various categories.

== Multiple winners ==
=== Men ===
Wins	Rider	Years
5	Csaba Steig	1990, 1991, 1992, 1993, 2001
3	László Halász	1976, 1977, 1979
3	László Bodrogi	1996, 2000, 2006
3	Attila Valter	2022, 2023, 2024
2	Márton Bencze	1954, 1957
2	Gábor Arany	1999, 2003
2	Ferenc Horváth	1958, 1959
2	Ferenc Keserű	1967, 1969
2	Péter Sajó	1984, 1987
2	Viktor Filutás	2020, 2021
2	Péter Kusztor	2010, 2012
2	Krisztián Lovassy	2013, 2017

=== Women ===
Wins	Rider	Years
9	Veronika Jäger	1994, 1995, 1996, 1998, 1999, 2000, 2001, 2002, 2004
6	Kata Blanka Vas	2020, 2021, 2022, 2023, 2024, 2025
6	Mónika Király	2005, 2006, 2007, 2009, 2016, 2017
4	Éva Izsák	1989, 1990, 1992, 1993
3	Anita Rita Kenyó	2008, 2011, 2012
3	Diána Pulsfort, Mrs. Szuromi	2013, 2014, 2015
2	Ágnes Kázmér	1983, 1984
2	Beáta Szabó-Kovács	1987, 1988

== Men ==
Hungarian National Road Race Championships – Men's elite race
Race details
- Region: Hungary
- Discipline: Road bicycle racing
- Type: One-day

History
- First edition: 1948
- First winner: Zoltán Tóbiás
- Most wins: Csaba Steig (5 wins)
- Most recent: Márton Dina

Year	Gold	Silver	Bronze
1948	Zoltán Tóbiás		
1949	Károly Kovács	Tibor Vida	József Kiss-Dala
1950	Tibor Vida	András Farkas	Géza Kertész
1951	Gyula Csikós	Pál Kucsera	Ferenc Zóka
1952	Béla Bartusek	Zoltán Tóbiás	István Trugli
1953	Gyula Sere		
1954	Márton Bencze	József Albert	Tibor Vida
1955	Lajos Szabó	György Viszt	Elek Csömör
1956	Endre Palotás	Péter	József Kiss-Dala
1957	Márton Bencze	Elek Csömör	Lajos Szabó
1958	Ferenc Horváth	Tibor Dietrich	Zoltán Török
1959	Ferenc Horváth	Antal Megyerdi	Péter Mátrai
1960	János Dévai	Antal Megyerdi	Ferenc Stámusz
1961	Béla Juhász	Lajos Aranyi	József Mezei
1962	Lajos Aranyi	Kovács	Attila Petróczy
1963-1966	No competition held		
1967	Ferenc Keserű	József Peterman	László Jezernitzky
1968	György Rajnai	József Peterman	János Juszkó
1969	Ferenc Keserű	László Jezernitzky	László Bojtor
1970	József Peterman	Antal Megyerdi	Tibor Debreceni
1971	János Sipos	László Bojtor	József Peterman
1972	Dezső Szemethi	József Cseke	Tibor Magyar
1973	Tibor Debreceni	János Sipos	
1974	Zsigmond Sarkadi Nagy	István Szlipcsevics	Imre Géra
1975	András Takács	Tibor Debreceni	Imre Géra
1976	László Halász	András Takács	Dezső Szemethi
1977	László Halász	Tibor Debreceni	István Szlipcsevics
1978	Ferenc Bürger	Dezső Szemethi	András Takács
1979	László Halász	Pál Liska	Zoltán Halász
1980	György Szuromi	Tamás Csathó	László Halász
1981	Tamás Csathó	György Zámbori	Gyula Prommer
1982	László Antal	György Szuromi	György Nagy
1983	József Hirth	Kornél Lázár	
1984	Péter Sajó	György Zámbori	
1985	Zoltán Halász	Pál Liska	László Halász
1986	György Zámbori	József Hirth	Pál Liska
1987	Péter Sajó	Pál Liska	József Ottó
1988	Zoltán Nagy	Zsolt Szmirnyák	Zoltán Vágvölgyi
1989	Zoltán Egyedi	József Hirth	Zoltán Nagy
1990	Csaba Steig	Károly Eisenkrammer	János Csikós
1991	Csaba Steig	Zoltán Egyedi	Tibor Valter
1992	Csaba Steig	Károly Eisenkrammer	György Szuromi
1993	Csaba Steig	Kornél Nagy	Gábor Kiss
1994	György Szuromi	László Heuschmiedt	Csaba Steig
1995	Tibor Valter	Attila Árvai	László Bodrogi
1996	László Bodrogi	János Istlstekker	Csaba Steig
1997	János Istlstekker	Dávid Sipőcz	László Bodrogi
1998	Csaba Szekeres	László Bodrogi	Dávid Arató
1999	Gábor Arany	Csaba Steig	Dávid Arató
2000	László Bodrogi	Csaba Steig	Dávid Sipőcz
2001	Csaba Steig	Csaba Szekeres	Aurél Víg
2002	Balázs Rohtmer	László Garamszegi	Dávid Arató
2003	Gábor Arany	László Garamszegi	Tamás Lengyel
2004	Aurél Víg	László Garamszegi	Attila Árvay
2005	László Garamszegi	Gábor Arany	Barnabás Vízer
2006	László Bodrogi	Gergely Ivanics	Gábor Arany
2007	Bálint Szeghalmi	László Bodrogi	Csaba Szekeres
2008	Zoltán Madaras	Péter Kusztor	Gergely Ivanics
2009	István Cziráki	Rida Cador	Gábor Arany
2010	Péter Kusztor	Bálint Szeghalmi	Gergely Kiss
2011	Rida Cador	Krisztián Lovassy	Péter Kusztor
2012	Péter Kusztor	Gábor Fejes	Krisztián Lovassy
2013	Krisztián Lovassy	Zsolt Dér	Péter Simon
2014	Balász Rózsa	Péter Kusztor	Krisztián Lovassy
2015	István Molnár	Péter Kusztor	Csaba Pályi
2016	János Pelikán	Krisztián Lovassy	Zsolt Dér
2017	Krisztián Lovassy	Zsolt Dér	Barnabás Peák
2018	Barnabás Peák	Márton Dina	Péter Simon
2019	Gergely Szarka	Barnabás Peák	Attila Valter
2020	Viktor Filutás	Dániel Dina	Gábor Fejes
2021	Viktor Filutás	Zsolt Istlstekker	Gergely Orosz
2022	Attila Valter	Márton Dina	Barnabás Peák
2023	Attila Valter	Márton Dina	Erik Fetter
2024	Attila Valter	Erik Fetter	Márton Dina
2025	Márton Dina	Zsombor Takács	Viktor Filutás
2026	Zsombor Takács	Bálint Feldhoffer	János Pelikán

== Women ==
Hungarian National Road Race Championships – Women's elite race
Race details
- Region: Hungary
- Discipline: Road bicycle racing
- Type: One-day

History
- First edition: 1983
- First winner: Ágnes Kázmér
- Most wins: Veronika Jäger (9 wins)
- Most recent: Kata Blanka Vas

Year	Gold	Silver	Bronze
1983	Ágnes Kázmér	Gabriella Horváth	
1984	Ágnes Kázmér	Gabriella Horváth	Márta Seregély
1985	Ildikó Molnár	Éva Izsák	Ágnes Kázmér
1986	Éva Izsák	Mariann Nagypál	Márta Seregély
1987	Beáta Szabó-Kovács	Éva Izsák	Márta Seregély
1988	Beáta Szabó-Kovács	Márta Seregély	Mariann Nagypál
1989	Éva Izsák	Emese Szalay	Anett Schirilla
1990	Éva Izsák	Emese Szalay	Beáta Szabó-Kovács
1991	Eszter Bujdosó	Erika Király	Márta Seregély
1992	Éva Izsák	Márta Seregély	Ildikó Zagarits
1993	Éva Izsák	Márta Seregély	Erika Király
1994	Veronika Jäger	Szilvia Csuha	Diana Mpima
1995	Veronika Jäger	Éva Izsák	Veronika Paré
1996	Veronika Jäger	Brigitta Ivánfi	Eszter Bujdosó
1997	Brigitta Ivánfi	Márta Vajda	Veronika Paré
1998	Veronika Jäger	Veronika Paré	Márta Vajda
1999	Veronika Jäger	Márta Vajda	Veronika Paré
2000	Veronika Jäger	Márta Vajda	Andrea Fülöp
2001	Veronika Jäger	Renáta Danis	Katalin Halasi, Mrs. Filutás
2002	Veronika Jäger	Márta Vajda	Katalin Halasi, Mrs. Filutás
2003	Márta Vajda	Erika Csomor	Katalin Halasi, Mrs. Filutás
2004	Veronika Jäger	Mónika Király	Márta Vajda
2005	Mónika Király	Gabriella Arató	Katalin Bálint
2006	Mónika Király	Diána Pulsfort, Mrs. Szuromi	Andrea Fülöp
2007	Mónika Király	Diána Pulsfort, Mrs. Szuromi	Gabriella Palotai
2008	Anita Rita Kenyó	Mónika Király	Veronika Simon, Mrs. Katona
2009	Mónika Király	Anita Rita Kenyó	Veronika Simon, Mrs. Katona
2010	Krisztina Fáy	Sára Vidákovich	Enikő Papp
2011	Anita Rita Kenyó	Krisztina Fáy	Veronika Anna Kormos
2012	Anita Rita Kenyó	Eszter Dósa	Veronika Anna Kormos
2013	Diána Pulsfort, Mrs. Szuromi	Leila Al Saidi	Fruzsina Jakócs
2014	Diána Pulsfort, Mrs. Szuromi	Barbara Benkó	Veronika Anna Kormos
2015	Diána Pulsfort, Mrs. Szuromi	Mónika Király	Barbara Benkó
2016	Mónika Király	Barbara Benkó	Dorottya Kanti
2017	Mónika Király	Szonja Kapott	Eszter Temela
2018	Barbara Benkó	Mónika Király	Eszter Temela
2019	Zsófia Szabó	Etelka Matuz	Eszter Temela
2020	Kata Blanka Vas	Zsófia Szabó	Barbara Benkó
2021	Kata Blanka Vas	Barbara Benkó	Zsófia Szabó
2022	Kata Blanka Vas	Dorka Jordán	Petra Zsankó
2023	Kata Blanka Vas	Petra Zsankó	Dorka Jordán
2024	Kata Blanka Vas	Petra Zsankó	Szonja Greman
2025	Kata Blanka Vas	Petra Zsankó	Szonja Greman
2026	Petra Zsankó	Szonja German	Luca Barta

== See also ==
- Hungarian National Time Trial Championships
