= 2024 Tour de Hongrie =

2024 UCI ProSeries
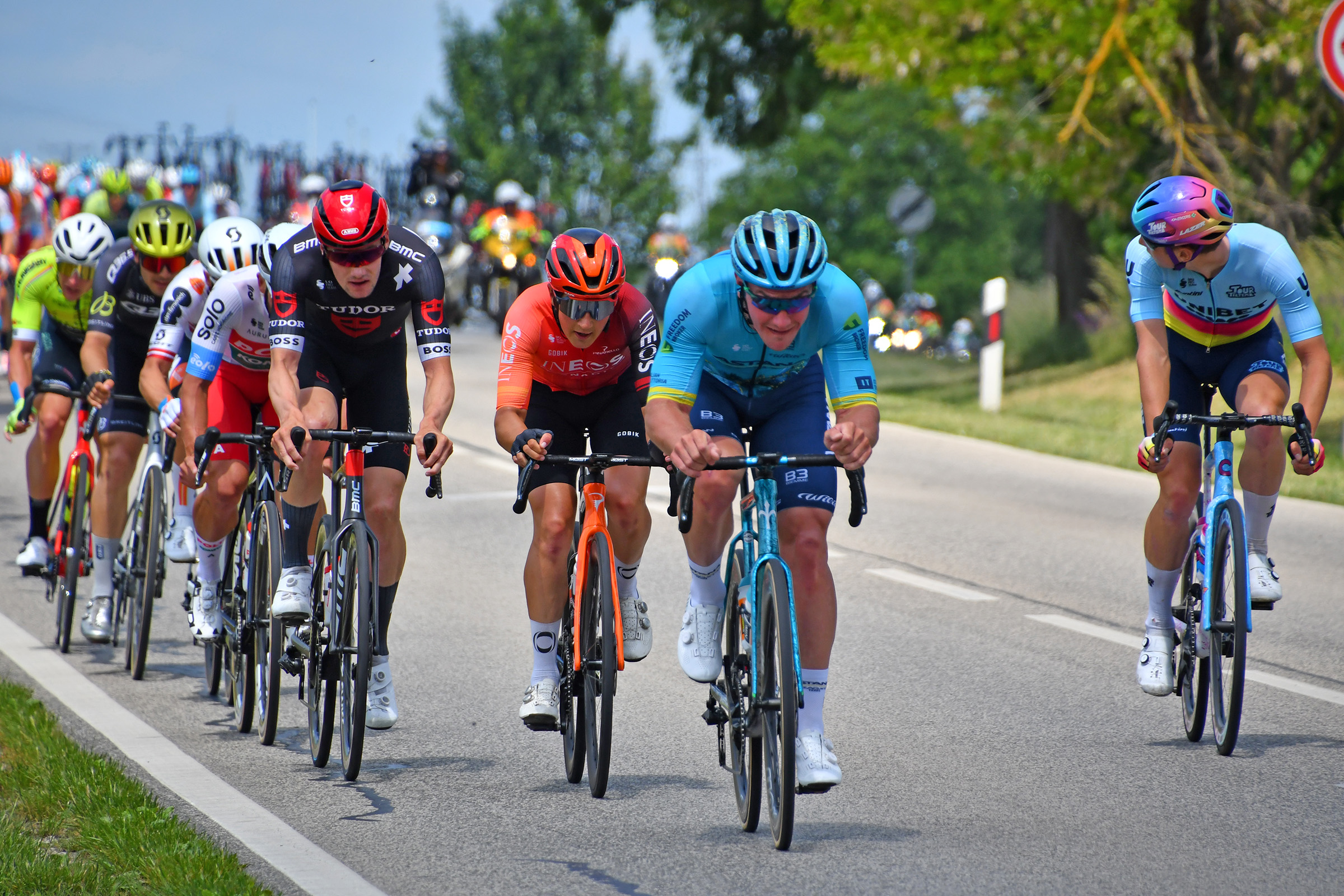
- Riders on Stage 5 in the town of Som, Hungary

Race details
- Dates: 8–12 May 2024
- Stages: 5
- Distance: 851 km (528.8 mi)
- Winning time: 19h 36' 00"

Results
Jersey awarded to the overall winner	Winner	Thibau Nys (BEL)	(Lidl–Trek)
	Second	Emanuel Buchmann (GER)	(Bora–Hansgrohe)
	Third	Wout Poels (NED)	(Team Bahrain Victorious)
Jersey awarded to the points classification winner	Points	Thibau Nys (BEL)	(Lidl–Trek)
Jersey awarded to the mountains classification winner	Mountains	Siebe Deweirdt (BEL)	(Team Flanders–Baloise)
	Team	(Switzerland) Q36.5 Pro Cycling Team	

The 2024 Tour de Hongrie was the 45th edition of the Tour de Hongrie, which took place between 8 and 12 May 2024. It was the tenth edition since the race's revival in 2015, and was rated as a 2.Pro-category event as part of the 2024 UCI ProSeries.

== Teams ==
8 of the 18 UCI WorldTeams, 8 UCI ProTeams, 3 UCI Continental teams and the Hungarian national team made up the 20 teams that participated in the race, with seven riders each.

UCI WorldTeams

- Astana Qazaqstan Team
- Bora–Hansgrohe
- Ineos Grenadiers
- Lidl–Trek
- Team Bahrain Victorious
- Team dsm–firmenich PostNL
- Team Jayco–AlUla
- UAE Team Emirates

UCI ProTeams

- Euskaltel–Euskadi
- Lotto–Dstny
- Polti–Kometa
- Q36.5 Pro Cycling Team
- TDT–Unibet Cycling Team
- Team Corratec–Vini Fantini
- Team Flanders–Baloise
- Tudor Pro Cycling Team

UCI Continental Teams

- Epronex - Hungary Cycling Team
- Pierre Baguette Cycling
- Team MBH Bank Colpack Ballan

National Teams

- Hungary

== Route ==
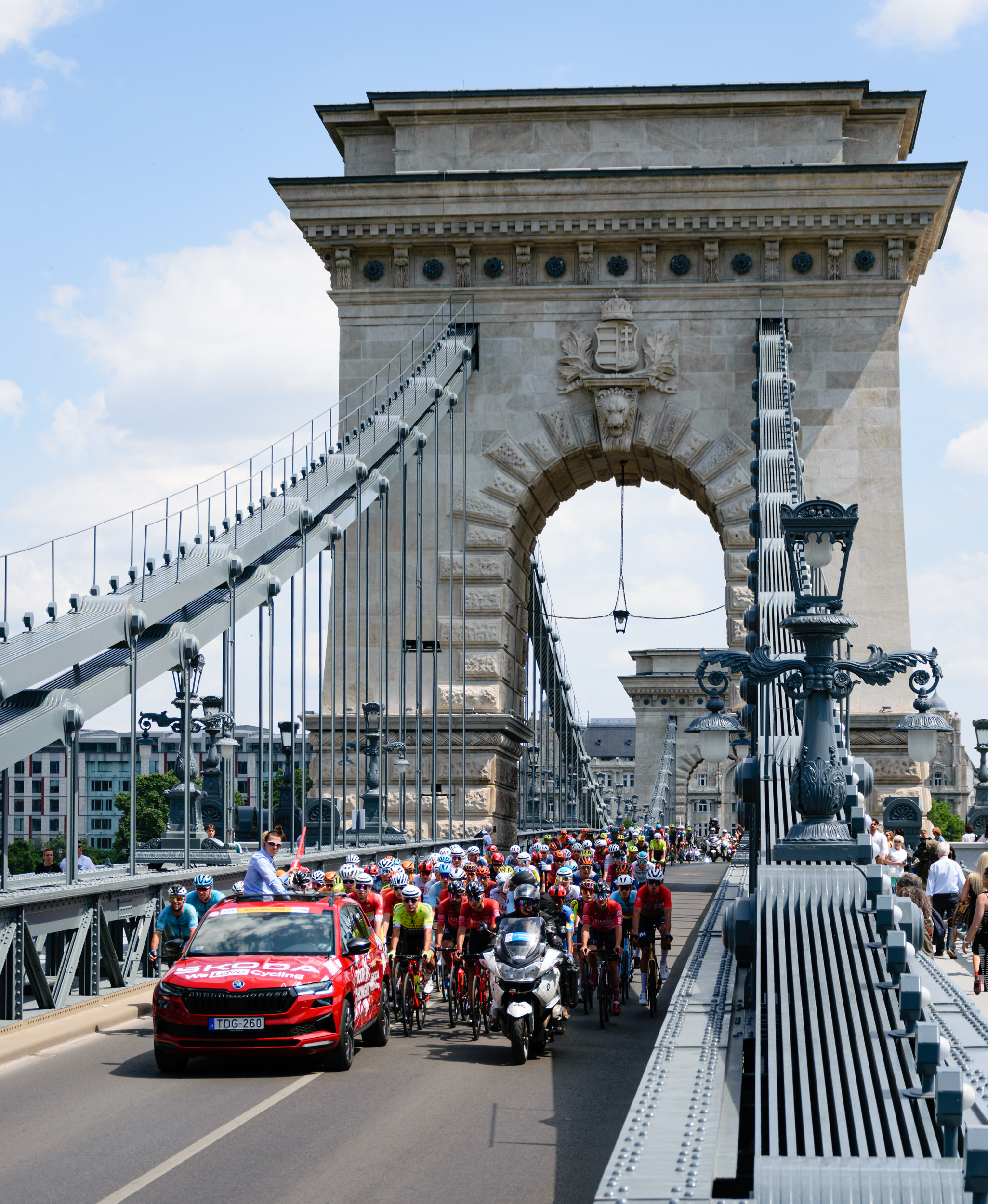
Riders behind the pace car of race director László Szilasi on Stage 4 of the 2024 Tour de Hongrie, crossing the Széchenyi Chain Bridge, in Budapest, Hungary

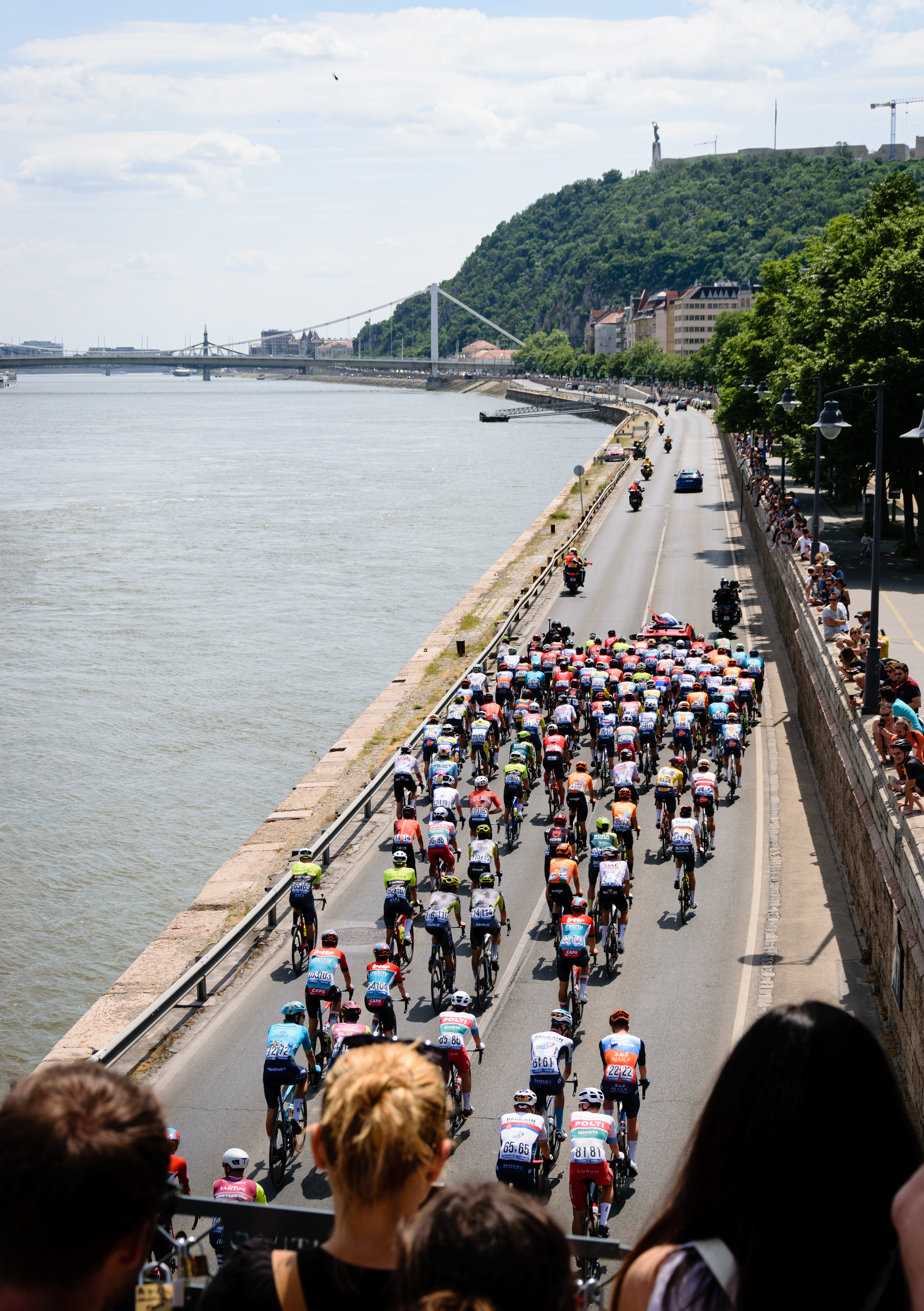
Stage 4 on the right bank of Danube, in Budapest

Stage characteristics and winners
Stage	Date	Route	Distance	Elevation gain	Type	Winner
1	8 May	Karcag to Hajdúszoboszló	166.1 km (103.2 mi)	340 m (1,120 ft)	Flat stage	Sam Welsford (AUS)
2	9 May	Tokaj to Kazincbarcika	162.1 km (100.7 mi)	1,023 m (3,356 ft)	Flat stage	Mark Cavendish (GBR)
3	10 May	Kazincbarcika to Gyöngyös (Kékestető)	182.7 km (113.5 mi)	2,716 m (8,911 ft)	Intermediate stage	Thibau Nys (BEL)
4	11 May	Budapest to Etyek	166.6 km (103.5 mi)	1,451 m (4,760 ft)	Hilly stage	Thibau Nys (BEL)
5	12 May	Siófok to Pécs	173.2 km (107.6 mi)	2,341 m (7,680 ft)	Intermediate stage	Wout Poels (NED)
Total			851 km (529 mi)	7,871 m (25,823 ft)		

== Stages ==
=== Stage 1 ===
8 May 2024 — Karcag to Hajdúszoboszló, 166.1 km (103.2 mi)

Stage 1 Result
Rank	Rider	Team	Time
1	Sam Welsford (AUS)	Bora–Hansgrohe	3h 52' 48"
2	Samuel Quaranta (ITA)	Team MBH Bank Colpack Ballan	+ 0"
3	Jakub Mareczko (ITA)	Team Corratec–Vini Fantini	+ 0"
4	Nicklas Amdi Pedersen (DEN)	TDT–Unibet Cycling Team	+ 0"
5	Manuel Peñalver (ESP)	Polti–Kometa	+ 0"
6	Mark Cavendish (GBR)	Astana Qazaqstan Team	+ 0"
7	Jon Aberasturi (ESP)	Euskaltel–Euskadi	+ 0"
8	Andrej Líška (SVK)	Pierre Baguette Cycling	+ 0"
9	Jarne Van de Paar (BEL)	Lotto–Dstny	+ 0"
10	Tomáš Kalojíros (CZE)	Pierre Baguette Cycling	+ 0"

General classification after Stage 1
Rank	Rider	Team	Time
1	Sam Welsford (AUS)	Bora–Hansgrohe	3h 52' 38"
2	Martin Voltr (CZE)	Pierre Baguette Cycling	+ 3"
3	Samuel Quaranta (ITA)	Team MBH Bank Colpack Ballan	+ 4"
4	Jakub Mareczko (ITA)	Team Corratec–Vini Fantini	+ 6"
5	Balázs Rózsa (HUN)	Epronex - Hungary Cycling Team	+ 6"
6	Viktor Filutás (HUN)	Hungary	+ 6"
7	Marc Hirschi (SUI)	UAE Team Emirates	+ 8"
8	Lander Loockx (BEL)	TDT–Unibet Cycling Team	+ 9"
9	Nicklas Amdi Pedersen (DEN)	TDT–Unibet Cycling Team	+ 10"
10	Davide Persico (ITA)	Bingoal WB	+ 10"

=== Stage 2 ===
9 May 2024 — Tokaj to Kazincbarcika, 162.1 km (100.7 mi)

Stage 2 Result
Rank	Rider	Team	Time
1	Mark Cavendish (GBR)	Astana Qazaqstan Team	3h 45' 11"
2	Dylan Groenewegen (NED)	Team Jayco–AlUla	+ 0"
3	Jon Aberasturi (ESP)	Euskaltel–Euskadi	+ 0"
4	Mathias Vacek (CZE)	Lidl–Trek	+ 0"
5	Matteo Moschetti (ITA)	Q36.5 Pro Cycling Team	+ 0"
6	Elia Viviani (ITA)	Ineos Grenadiers	+ 0"
7	Cameron Scott (AUS)	Team Bahrain Victorious	+ 0"
8	Manuel Peñalver (ESP)	Polti–Kometa	+ 0"
9	Álvaro Hodeg (COL)	UAE Team Emirates	+ 0"
10	Emīls Liepiņš (LAT)	Team dsm–firmenich PostNL	+ 0"

General classification after Stage 2
Rank	Rider	Team	Time
1	Martin Voltr (CZE)	Pierre Baguette Cycling	7h 37' 44"
2	Mark Cavendish (GBR)	Astana Qazaqstan Team	+ 5"
3	Sam Welsford (AUS)	Bora–Hansgrohe	+ 5"
4	Zsolt Istlstekker (HUN)	Epronex - Hungary Cycling Team	+ 10"
5	Jon Aberasturi (ESP)	Euskaltel–Euskadi	+ 11"
6	Jakub Mareczko (ITA)	Team Corratec–Vini Fantini	+ 11"
7	Balázs Rózsa (HUN)	Epronex - Hungary Cycling Team	+ 11"
8	Viktor Filutás (HUN)	Hungary	+ 11"
9	Siebe Deweirdt (BEL)	Team Flanders–Baloise	+ 12"
10	Marc Hirschi (SUI)	UAE Team Emirates	+ 13"

=== Stage 3 ===
10 May 2024 — Kazincbarcika to Gyöngyös (Kékestető), 182.7 km (113.5 mi)

Stage 3 Result
Rank	Rider	Team	Time
1	Thibau Nys (BEL)	Lidl–Trek	4h 31' 52"
2	Diego Ulissi (ITA)	UAE Team Emirates	+ 0"
3	Emanuel Buchmann (GER)	Bora–Hansgrohe	+ 0"
4	Yannis Voisard (SUI)	Tudor Pro Cycling Team	+ 4"
5	Wout Poels (NED)	Team Bahrain Victorious	+ 9"
6	Harm Vanhoucke (BEL)	Lotto–Dstny	+ 11"
7	Callum Scotson (AUS)	Team Jayco–AlUla	+ 11"
8	Óscar Rodríguez (ESP)	Ineos Grenadiers	+ 17"
9	Marc Hirschi (SUI)	UAE Team Emirates	+ 19"
10	Damien Howson (AUS)	Q36.5 Pro Cycling Team	+ 26"

General classification after Stage 3
Rank	Rider	Team	Time
1	Thibau Nys (BEL)	Lidl–Trek	12h 09' 41"
2	Diego Ulissi (ITA)	UAE Team Emirates	+ 4"
3	Emanuel Buchmann (GER)	Bora–Hansgrohe	+ 6"
4	Yannis Voisard (SUI)	Tudor Pro Cycling Team	+ 14"
5	Wout Poels (NED)	Team Bahrain Victorious	+ 18"
6	Harm Vanhoucke (BEL)	Lotto–Dstny	+ 21"
7	Callum Scotson (AUS)	Team Jayco–AlUla	+ 21"
8	Marc Hirschi (SUI)	UAE Team Emirates	+ 27"
9	Óscar Rodríguez (ESP)	Ineos Grenadiers	+ 27"
10	Damien Howson (AUS)	Q36.5 Pro Cycling Team	+ 36"

=== Stage 4 ===
11 May 2024 — Budapest to Etyek, 166.6 km (103.5 mi)

Stage 4 Result
Rank	Rider	Team	Time
1	Thibau Nys (BEL)	Lidl–Trek	3h 33' 02"
2	Marc Hirschi (SUI)	UAE Team Emirates	+ 0"
3	Yannis Voisard (SUI)	Tudor Pro Cycling Team	+ 0"
4	Lander Loockx (BEL)	TDT–Unibet Cycling Team	+ 0"
5	Harm Vanhoucke (BEL)	Lotto–Dstny	+ 0"
6	Javier Serrano (ESP)	Polti–Kometa	+ 0"
7	Frank van den Broek (NED)	Team dsm–firmenich PostNL	+ 0"
8	Diego Ulissi (ITA)	UAE Team Emirates	+ 0"
9	Emanuel Buchmann (GER)	Bora–Hansgrohe	+ 0"
10	Elias Maris (BEL)	Team Flanders–Baloise	+ 0"

General classification after Stage 4
Rank	Rider	Team	Time
1	Thibau Nys (BEL)	Lidl–Trek	15h 42' 33"
2	Diego Ulissi (ITA)	UAE Team Emirates	+ 14"
3	Emanuel Buchmann (GER)	Bora–Hansgrohe	+ 16"
4	Yannis Voisard (SUI)	Tudor Pro Cycling Team	+ 20"
5	Wout Poels (NED)	Team Bahrain Victorious	+ 28"
6	Marc Hirschi (SUI)	UAE Team Emirates	+ 31"
7	Harm Vanhoucke (BEL)	Lotto–Dstny	+ 31"
8	Callum Scotson (AUS)	Team Jayco–AlUla	+ 31"
9	Óscar Rodríguez (ESP)	Ineos Grenadiers	+ 37"
10	Damien Howson (AUS)	Q36.5 Pro Cycling Team	+ 46"

=== Stage 5 ===
12 May 2024 — Siófok to Pécs, 173.2 km (107.6 mi)

Stage 5 Result
Rank	Rider	Team	Time
1	Wout Poels (NED)	Team Bahrain Victorious	3h 53' 27"
2	Damien Howson (AUS)	Q36.5 Pro Cycling Team	+ 0"
3	Emanuel Buchmann (GER)	Bora–Hansgrohe	+ 0"
4	Thibau Nys (BEL)	Lidl–Trek	+ 0"
5	Frank van den Broek (NED)	Lotto–Dstny	+ 5"
6	Diego Ulissi (ITA)	UAE Team Emirates	+ 5"
7	Callum Scotson (AUS)	Team Jayco–AlUla	+ 5"
8	Harm Vanhoucke (BEL)	Lotto–Dstny	+ 5"
9	Marc Hirschi (SUI)	UAE Team Emirates	+ 5"
10	Lander Loockx (BEL)	TDT–Unibet Cycling Team	+ 21"

General classification after Stage 5
Rank	Rider	Team	Time
1	Thibau Nys (BEL)	Lidl–Trek	19h 36' 00"
2	Emanuel Buchmann (GER)	Bora–Hansgrohe	+ 12"
3	Wout Poels (NED)	Team Bahrain Victorious	+ 18"
4	Diego Ulissi (ITA)	UAE Team Emirates	+ 19"
5	Marc Hirschi (SUI)	UAE Team Emirates	+ 36"
6	Harm Vanhoucke (BEL)	Lotto–Dstny	+ 36"
7	Callum Scotson (AUS)	Team Jayco–AlUla	+ 36"
8	Damien Howson (AUS)	Q36.5 Pro Cycling Team	+ 40"
9	Óscar Rodríguez (ESP)	Ineos Grenadiers	+ 59"
10	Yannis Voisard (SUI)	Tudor Pro Cycling Team	+ 1' 02"

== Classification leadership table ==
Points for the points classification
Type	1	2	3	4	5	6	7	8	9	10
Stage finishes	15	12	10	8	6	5	4	3	2	1
Intermediate sprint	5	3	1	0						

Points for the mountains classification
Type	1	2	3	4	5	6	7
Points for Category	15	10	8	6	4	2	1
Points for Category	10	6	4	2	1	0	
Points for Category	5	3	1	0			

In the 2024 Tour de Hongrie, four different jerseys were awarded.

The general classification is calculated by adding each cyclist's finishing times on each stage. The leader of the general classification receives a yellow jersey, sponsored by the Hungarian Tourism Agency (BalatonBike365) and Hungarian Cycling Federation ("Bringasport"). The winner of this classification is considered the winner of the race.

The second classification is the points classification. Riders are awarded points for finishing in the top fifteen of each stage. Points are also on offer at intermediate sprints. The leader of the points classification wears a green jersey, sponsored by Škoda and Europcar.

There is also a mountains classification for which points are awarded for reaching the top of a climb before other riders. The climbs are categorized, in order of increasing difficulty, as first, second, and third-category. The leader of the mountains classification wears a red jersey, sponsored by Cofidis.

The fourth jersey is a classification for Hungarian riders, marked by a white jersey sponsored by the Hungarian Public Road Company (Hungarian: Magyar Közút). Only Hungarian riders are eligible and they are ranked according to their placement in the general classification of the race.

The final classification is the team classification, for which the times of the best three cyclists in each team on each stage are added together; the leading team at the end of the race is the team with the lowest cumulative time.

Classification leadership by stage
Stage	Winner	General classification	Points classification	Mountains classification	Hungarian rider classification	Team classification
1	Sam Welsford	Sam Welsford	Sam Welsford	not awarded	Balázs Rózsa	Pierre Baguette Cycling
2	Mark Cavendish	Martin Voltr	Martin Voltr	Siebe Deweirdt	Zsolt Istlstekker	Pierre Baguette Cycling
3	Thibau Nys	Thibau Nys	Martin Voltr	Siebe Deweirdt	Márton Dina	UAE Team Emirates
4	Thibau Nys	Thibau Nys	Thibau Nys	Siebe Deweirdt	Márton Dina	UAE Team Emirates
5	Wout Poels	Thibau Nys	Thibau Nys	Siebe Deweirdt	Márton Dina	Q36.5 Pro Cycling Team
Final		Thibau Nys	Thibau Nys	Siebe Deweirdt	Márton Dina	Q36.5 Pro Cycling Team

- On stage 2, Samuel Quaranta, who was second in the points classification, wore the green jersey, because first-placed Sam Welsford wore the yellow jersey as the leader of the general classification.
- On stage 3, Mark Cavendish, who was second in the points classification, wore the green jersey, because first-placed Martin Voltr wore the yellow jersey as the leader of the general classification.
- On stage 5, Martin Voltr, who was second in the points classification, wore the green jersey, because first-placed Thibau Nys wore the yellow jersey as the leader of the general classification.

== Classification standings ==
Legend
Denotes the winner of the general classification	Denotes the winner of the points classification
Denotes the winner of the mountains classification	Denotes the winner of the Hungarian rider classification

=== General classification ===
Final general classification (1–10)
Rank	Rider	Team	Time
1	Thibau Nys (BEL)	Lidl–Trek	19h 36' 00"
2	Emanuel Buchmann (GER)	Bora–Hansgrohe	+ 12"
3	Wout Poels (NED)	Team Bahrain Victorious	+ 18"
4	Diego Ulissi (ITA)	UAE Team Emirates	+ 19"
5	Marc Hirschi (SUI)	UAE Team Emirates	+ 36"
6	Harm Vanhoucke (BEL)	Lotto–Dstny	+ 36"
7	Callum Scotson (AUS)	Team Jayco–AlUla	+ 36"
8	Damien Howson (AUS)	Q36.5 Pro Cycling Team	+ 40"
9	Óscar Rodríguez (ESP)	Ineos Grenadiers	+ 59"
10	Yannis Voisard (SUI)	Tudor Pro Cycling Team	+ 1' 02"

=== Points classification ===
Final points classification (1–10)
Rank	Rider	Team	Points
1	Thibau Nys (BEL)	Lidl–Trek	38
2	Mark Cavendish (GBR)	Astana Qazaqstan Team	35
3	Martin Voltr (CZE)	Pierre Baguette Cycling	24
4	Manuel Peñalver (ESP)	Polti–Kometa	24
5	Wout Poels (NED)	Team Bahrain Victorious	22
6	Emanuel Buchmann (GER)	Bora–Hansgrohe	22
7	Diego Ulissi (ITA)	UAE Team Emirates	20
8	Marc Hirschi (SUI)	UAE Team Emirates	19
9	Yannis Voisard (SUI)	Tudor Pro Cycling Team	18
10	Sam Welsford (AUS)	Bora–Hansgrohe	15

=== Mountains classification ===
Final mountains classification (1–10)
Rank	Rider	Team	Points
1	Siebe Deweirdt (BEL)	Team Flanders–Baloise	21
2	Vincent Van Hemelen (BEL)	Team Flanders–Baloise	20
3	Thibau Nys (BEL)	Lidl–Trek	17
4	Wout Poels (NED)	Team Bahrain Victorious	14
5	Christian Bagatin (ITA)	Team MBH Bank Colpack Ballan	12
6	Emanuel Buchmann (GER)	Bora–Hansgrohe	12
7	Diego Ulissi (ITA)	UAE Team Emirates	10
8	Kelland O'Brien (AUS)	Team Jayco–AlUla	8
9	Diego Pablo Sevilla (ESP)	Polti–Kometa	6
10	Damien Howson (AUS)	Q36.5 Pro Cycling Team	6

=== Hungarian rider classification ===
Final Hungarian rider classification (1–10)
Rank	Rider	Team	Time
1	Márton Dina (HUN)	Hungary	19h 37' 19"
2	Márk Valent (HUN)	Team MBH Bank Colpack Ballan	+ 8' 14"
3	Erik Fetter (HUN)	Polti–Kometa	+ 10' 12"
4	Zétény Szijártó (HUN)	Hungary	+ 13' 38"
5	Bálint Feldhoffer (HUN)	Hungary	+ 14' 02"
6	Viktor Filutás (HUN)	Hungary	+ 21' 40"
7	Zsolt Istlstekker (HUN)	Epronex - Hungary Cycling Team	+ 22' 13"
8	Barnabás Peák (HUN)	Hungary	+ 24' 15"
9	Ádám Karl (HUN)	Epronex - Hungary Cycling Team	+ 26' 19"
10	Balázs Rózsa (HUN)	Epronex - Hungary Cycling Team	+ 27' 28"

=== Team classification ===
Final team classification (1–10)
Rank	Team	Time
1	(Switzerland) Q36.5 Pro Cycling Team	58h 52' 20"
2	(United Arab Emirates) UAE Team Emirates	+ 11"
3	(Germany) Bora–Hansgrohe	+ 49"
4	(United States) Lidl–Trek	+ 1' 02"
5	(Belgium) Lotto–Dstny	+ 1' 42"
6	(Spain) Euskaltel–Euskadi	+ 2' 31"
7	(Belgium) Team Flanders–Baloise	+ 5' 04"
8	(Netherlands) TDT–Unibet Cycling Team	+ 5' 41"
9	(Australia) Team Jayco–AlUla	+ 11' 32"
10	(United Kingdom) Ineos Grenadiers	+ 12' 32"

== See also ==
- 2024 in men's road cycling
- 2024 in sports
