= Hungarian National Time Trial Championships =

National road cycling championship in Hungary

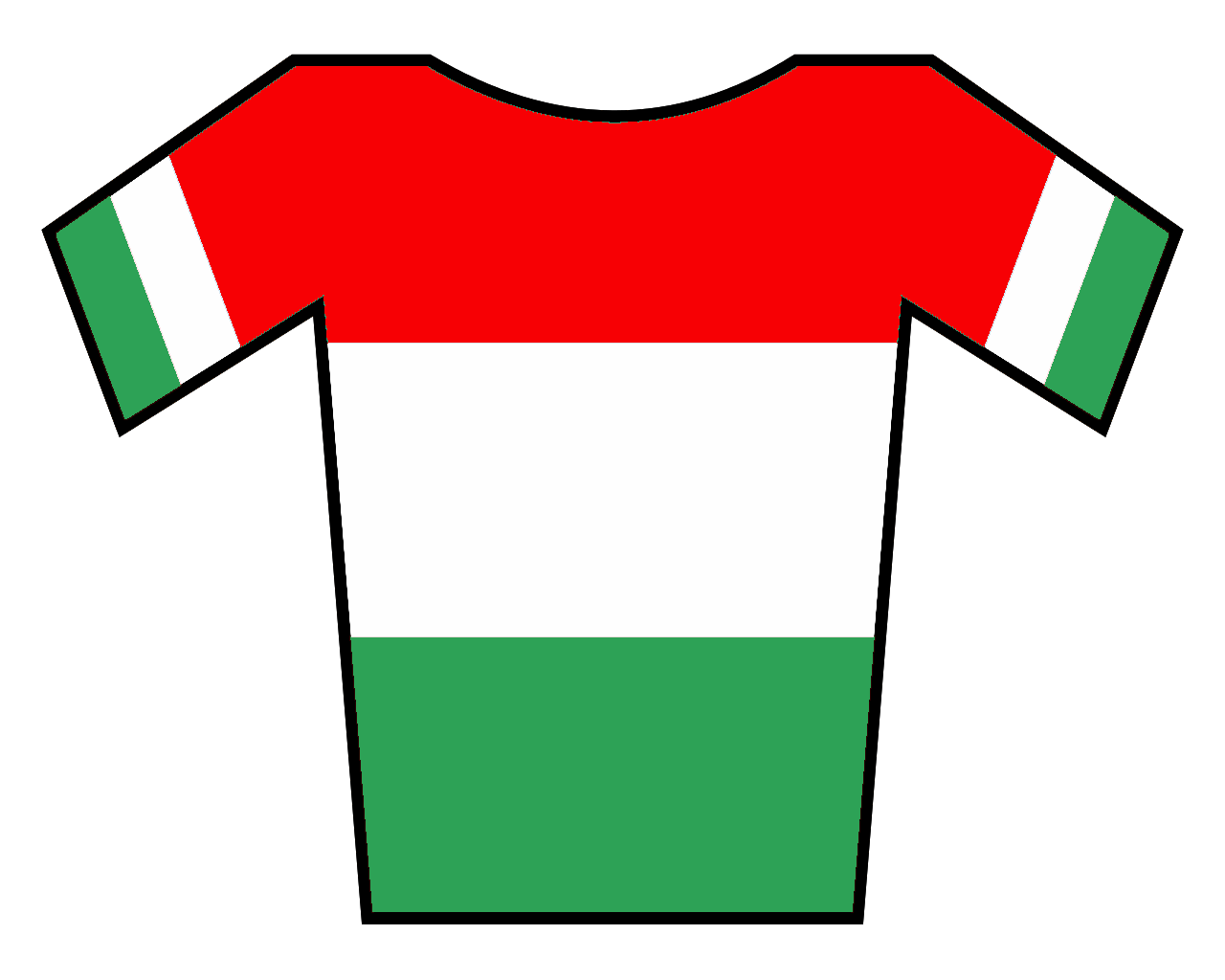
The Champion's Jersey

The Hungarian National Time Trial Championships are organized annually by the Hungarian Cycling Federation to decide the champions in the time trial discipline, across various categories.

== Multiple Winners ==
=== Men ===
| Wins | Rider | Years |
|---|---|---|
| 10 | László Bodrogi | 1997, 1998, 2000, 2001, 2002, 2003, 2004, 2006, 2007, 2008 |
| 4 | Gábor Fejes | 2011, 2012, 2013, 2014 |
| 2 | János Pelikán | 2016, 2017 |
| 2 | Barnabás Peák | 2018, 2020 |
| 2 | Erik Fetter | 2021, 2022 |

=== Women ===
| Wins | Rider | Years |
|---|---|---|
| 4 | Mónika Király | 2008, 2013, 2016, 2017 |
| 3 | Veronika Anna Kormos | 2014, 2015, 2019 |
| 3 | Blanka Vas | 2021, 2022, 2023 |
| 2 | Renáta Danis | 2001, 2002 |
| 2 | Erika Csomor | 2003, 2004 |
| 2 | Diána Szurominé Pulsfort | 2006, 2007 |
| 2 | Aniko Revesz | 2009, 2010 |

== Men ==
=== Elite ===
Hungarian National Time Trial Championships – Men's elite time trial
Race details
- Region: Hungary
- Discipline: Road bicycle racing
- Type: One-day

History
- First edition: 1997
- First winner: László Bodrogi
- Most wins: László Bodrogi (10 wins)
- Most recent: Erik Fetter

| Year | Gold | Silver | Bronze |
| 1997 | László Bodrogi | | |
| 1998 | László Bodrogi | Csaba Szekeres | Aurél Vig |
| 1999 | Aurél Vig | Peter Legradi | Gábor Kisko |
| 2000 | László Bodrogi | Peter Legradi | Tamás Vilmányi |
| 2001 | László Bodrogi | Peter Legradi | Zoltan Vanik |
| 2002 | László Bodrogi | Csaba Szekeres | Peter Legradi |
| 2003 | László Bodrogi | Csaba Szekeres | Aurél Vig |
| 2004 | László Bodrogi | Csaba Szekeres | Aurél Vig |
| 2005 | Csaba Szekeres | Bence Szuromi | Péter Kusztor |
| 2006 | László Bodrogi | Csaba Szekeres | Tamás Lengyel |
| 2007 | László Bodrogi | Peter Legradi | Tamás Lengyel |
| 2008 | László Bodrogi | Zoltán Madaras | András Berkesi |
| 2009 | Rida Cador | Zoltán Madaras | Gergely Ivanics |
| 2010 | Péter Kusztor | Gábor Kisko | János Hemmert |
| 2011 | Gábor Fejes | Péter Palotai | Bálint Szeghalmi |
| 2012 | Gábor Fejes | Gábor Lengyel | Péter Palotai |
| 2013 | Gábor Fejes | Žsolt Dér | Péter Kusztor |
| 2014 | Gábor Fejes | Krisztián Lovassy | Péter Kusztor |
| 2015 | Krisztián Lovassy | Žsolt Dér | Tibor Róka |
| 2016 | János Pelikán | Žsolt Dér | Péter Kusztor |
| 2017 | János Pelikán | Barnabás Peák | Žsolt Dér |
| 2018 | Barnabás Peák | Gábor Fejes | János Pelikán |
| 2019 | Attila Valter | János Pelikán | Barnabás Peák |
| 2020 | Barnabás Peák | Attila Valter | Daniel Szalay |
| 2021 | Erik Fetter | Attila Valter | János Pelikán |
| 2022 | Erik Fetter | Barnabás Peák | Gergely Somogyi |

=== U23 ===
| Year | Gold | Silver | Bronze |
| 2005 | Péter Kusztor | Ákos Haiszer | Béla Grósz |
| 2006 | Ákos Haiszer | István Cziráki | Zoltán Vígh |
| 2007 | Not Held | | |
| 2008 | Not Held | | |
| 2009 | Gábor Fejes | Balázs Simon | Krisztián Lovassy |
| 2010 | Gábor Fejes | Krisztián Lovassy | Balász Suhajda |
| 2011 | Not Held | | |
| 2012 | Péter Palotai | Péter Varga | Csaba Pályi |
| 2013 | Ábel Kenyeres | Péter Palotai | Péter Varga |
| 2014 | János Pelikán | Zoltán Lengyel | Máté Mogyorósi |
| 2015 | Viktor Filutás | Zoltán Lengyel | Máté Fegyveres |
| 2016 | David Kovács | Viktor Filutás | Máté Kovács |
| 2017 | Viktor Filutás | Zsombor Wermeser | Vince András |
| 2018 | Attila Valter | Vince András | Dániel Dina |

== Women ==
Hungarian National Time Trial Championships – Women's elite time trial
Race details
- Region: Hungary
- Discipline: Road bicycle racing
- Type: One-day

History
- First edition: 1998
- First winner: Veronika Pare
- Most wins: Mónika Király (4 wins)
- Most recent: Blanka Vas

| Year | Gold | Silver | Bronze |
| 1998 | Veronika Pare | Adrienn Roszik | Eszter Bujdosó |
| 1999 | Veronika Jeger | Veronika Pare | Ildiko Törzsök |
| 2000 | Katalin Filutasne Halasi | Veronika Jeger | Erika Csomor |
| 2001 | Renáta Danis | Katalin Filutasne Halasi | Erika Csomor |
| 2002 | Renáta Danis | Katalin Filutasne Halasi | Veronika Jeger |
| 2003 | Erika Csomor | Katalin Filutasne Halasi | Marta Vajda |
| 2004 | Erika Csomor | Veronika Jeger | Marta Vajda |
| 2005 | Not Held | | |
| 2006 | Diána Szurominé Pulsfort | Mónika Király | Ibolya Ember |
| 2007 | Diána Szurominé Pulsfort | Mónika Király | Ibolya Ember |
| 2008 | Mónika Király | Veronika Katonáné Simon | Eniko Papp |
| 2009 | Aniko Revesz | Veronika Katonáné Simon | Annamaria Halasz |
| 2010 | Aniko Revesz | Zsófia Tóth | Barbara Benkó |
| 2011 | Krisztina Fáy | Anita Rita Kenyo | Gitta Arany |
| 2012 | Gabriella Zelinka | Anita Rita Kenyo | Eszter Dósa |
| 2013 | Mónika Király | Eszter Dósa | Diána Szurominé Pulsfort |
| 2014 | Veronika Anna Kormos | Diána Szurominé Pulsfort | Kornelia Epres |
| 2015 | Veronika Anna Kormos | Diána Szurominé Pulsfort | Mónika Király |
| 2016 | Mónika Király | Veronika Anna Kormos | Anita Rita Kenyo |
| 2017 | Mónika Király | Szonja Kapott | Anita Rita Kenyo |
| 2018 | Adrienn Hajnal | Mónika Király | Gitta Arany |
| 2019 | Veronika Anna Kormos | Adrienn Hajnal | Etelka Matuz |
| 2020 | Barbara Benkó | Blanka Vas | Zsófia Szabó |
| 2021 | Blanka Vas | Barbara Benkó | Dorka Jordán |
| 2022 | Blanka Vas | Petra Zsankó | Dorka Jordán |
| 2023 | Blanka Vas | Fanni Hajdu | Niké Péteri |

== See also ==
Hungarian National Road Race Championships
