= Grand Prix Cycliste de Gemenc =

Annual cycling race held in Hungary

Gemenc Grand Prix
Race details
- Date: May (as 2017)
- Region: Szekszárd
- Discipline: Road
- Competition: UCI Europe Tour
- Type: Stage race
- Web site: gemencgp.hu

History
- First edition: 1975
- Editions: 46 (as of 2023)
- First winner: Gyorgy Szuromi (HUN)
- Most wins: No repeat winners
- Most recent: Filip Řeha (CZE)

The Gemenc Grand Prix is a cycling race held annually in Hungary. It was part of UCI Europe Tour in category 2.2 from 2005 to 2009 and back again in the same category in 2017.

== Winners ==
Year	Winner	Second	Third
1975	(Hungary) Gyorgy Szuromi		
1976	(Hungary) Andras Takacs		
1977	(Hungary) Laszlo Halasz		
1978	(Hungary) Tamas Csatho		
1979	(Hungary) Zoltan Halasz		
1980	(East Germany) Andreas Neuer		
1981	(Hungary) Laszlo Halasz		
1982	(Czechoslovakia) Pavel Galik		
1983	(Hungary) Zoltan Halasz		
1984	(Czechoslovakia) Kurt Konrad		
1985	(Czechoslovakia) Vojtech Breska		
1986	(East Germany) Jörg Windorf		
1987	(Socialist Federal Republic of Yugoslavia) Rajko Cubric		
1988	(East Germany) Olaf Ludwig		
1989	(East Germany) Steffen Rein		
1990	(Czechoslovakia) Anton Novosad		
1991	(Hungary) Csaba Steig		
1992	(Hungary) Csaba Steig		
1993	(Slovenia) Iztok Melansek		
1994	(Czech Republic) Kurt Konrad		
1995	(Czech Republic) Jan Zilovec		
1996	(Germany) Enrico Poitschke		
1997	(Italy) David Sipocz		
1998	(Italy) Tartisio Saccucci		
1999	(Hungary) Attila Arvai		
2000	(Slovakia) Zoltan Remak		
2001	(Hungary) David Arato		
2002	(Hungary) David Arato	(Slovakia) Róbert Glajza	(Slovakia) Robert Nagy
2003	(Ukraine) Anatoli Varvaruk	(Ukraine) Alexei Nakazny	(Hungary) Tamás Lengyel
2004	(Slovakia) Zoltán Remák	(Hungary) Aurel Vig	(Ukraine) Anatoli Varvaruk
2005	(Slovakia) Martin Prázdnovský	(Italy) Anatolij Varvaruk	(Czech Republic) Stanislav Kozubek
2006	(Slovakia) Martin Prázdnovský	(Slovakia) Miroslav Keliar	(Slovakia) Maroš Kováč
2007	(Netherlands) Sander Oostlander	(Hungary) Péter Kusztor	(Bulgaria) Evgeni Gerganov
2008	(Italy) Davide Torosantucci	(Hungary) Zoltán Madaras	(Slovenia) Gašper Švab
2009	(Serbia) Žolt Der	(Slovakia) Matej Jurčo	(Croatia) Matija Kvasina
2010	(Hungary) Gergely Ivanics	(Hungary) Balász Szórádi	(Hungary) Zoltán Vígh
2011	(Hungary) Zoltán Csomor	(Argentina) Walter Gastón Trillini	(Australia) Mike Smith
2012	(Italy) Gianluca Mengardo	(Hungary) Zoltán Vígh	(Slovakia) Stanislav Bérěs
2013	(Hungary) Rida Cador	(Serbia) Žolt Der	(Slovakia) Patrik Tybor
2014	(Serbia) Marko Danilović	(Italy) Giacomo Gallio	(Italy) Marco Maronese
2015	(Slovakia) Maroš Kováč	(Romania) Andrei Nechita	(Croatia) Emanuel Kišerlovski
2016	(Slovenia) Rok Korošec	(Hungary) Krisztián Lovassy	(Italy) Filippo Tagliani
2017	(Italy) Filippo Tagliani	(Hungary) Péter Kusztor	(Austria) Jodok Salzmann
2018	(Slovakia) Rok Korosec	(Czech Republic) Michael Kukrle	(Moldova) Nicolae Tanovițchii
2022	(New Zealand) Luke Mudgway	(Czech Republic) Tomas Barta	(Poland) Damian Papierski
2023	(Czech Republic) Filip Řeha	(Australia) Dylan Hopkins	(Slovakia) Lukáš Kubiš
