= Attila Valter =

Hungarian cyclist

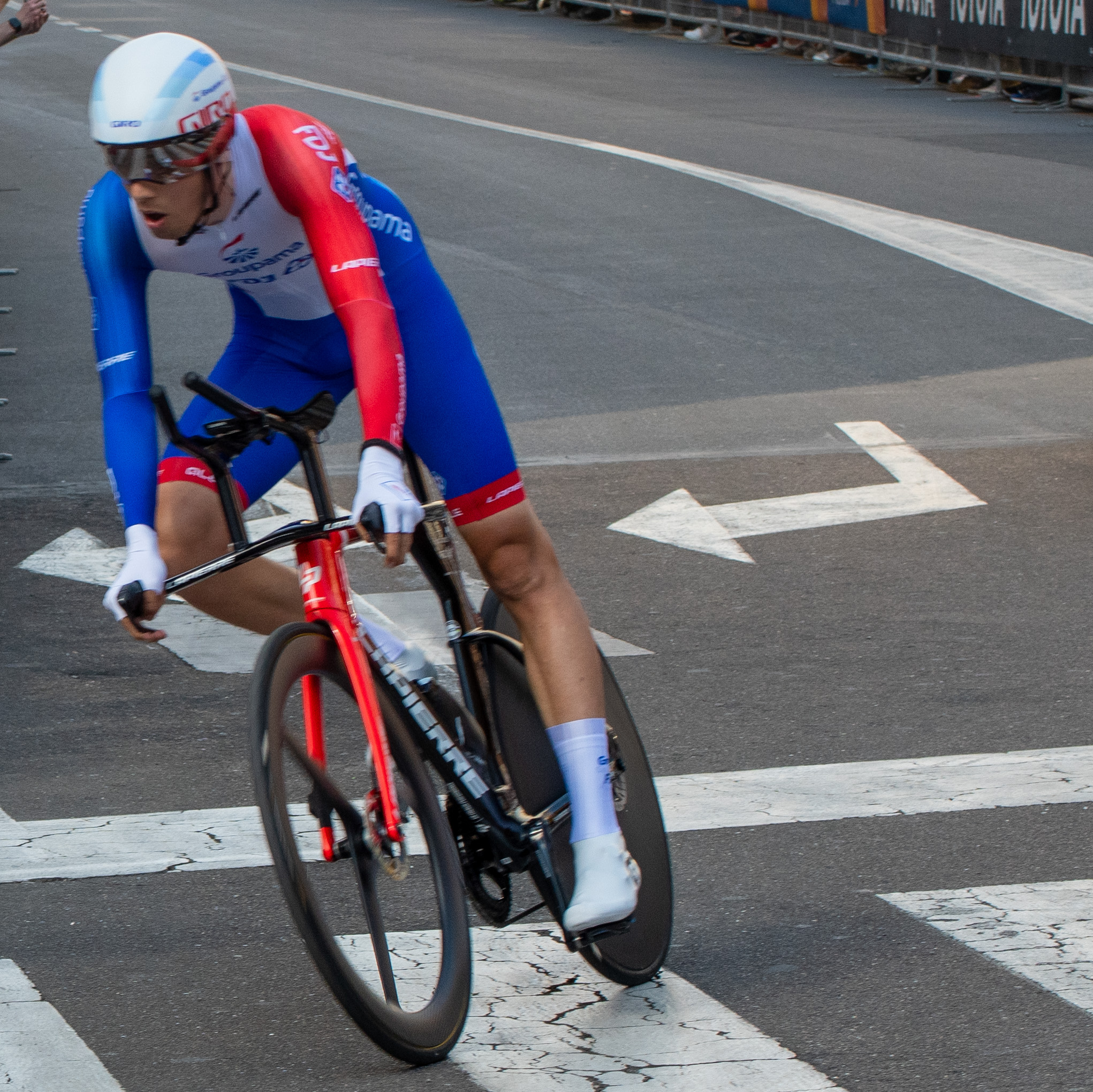

Personal information
- Full name: Attila Valter
- Nicknames: The Hungarian Hussar, Valter White
- Born: 12 June 1998 (age 28) Csömör, Hungary
- Height: 1.85 m (6 ft 1 in)
- Weight: 65 kg (143 lb)

Cycling career
- Sport: Cycling
- Current team: Visma–Lease a Bike
- Discipline: Road
- Role: Rider
- Rider type: Climber

Amateur teams
- 2015–2017: Cube Csömör
- 2018: Pannon Cycling Team
- 2019: CCC Development Team

Professional teams
- 2020: CCC Team
- 2021–2022: Groupama–FDJ
- 2023–2025: Team Jumbo–Visma
- 2026–: Team Bahrain Victorious

Major wins
- One-day races and classics National Road Race Championships (2022, 2023, 2024) National Time Trial Championships (2019, 2023)

Attila Valter (born 12 June 1998 in Csömör) is a Hungarian professional racing cyclist who currently rides for UCI WorldTeam Team Bahrain Victorious.

== Career ==
In 2019 Valter joined the CCC Development Team, having ridden for the Pannon Cycling Team the previous year. At the 2019 Tour de l'Avenir he won the ninth stage to Tignes. For the 2020 season Valter turned professional for the senior CCC Team. That year he won the Tour of Hungary, having finished third in the general classification the previous year. Valter was the first Hungarian winner of the race since 2005. In October 2020, he was named in the startlist for the 2020 Giro d'Italia, making his Grand Tour debut. Valter joined Groupama–FDJ for the 2021 season. At the 2021 Giro d'Italia, he took the overall lead after the sixth stage to San Giacomo, becoming the first Hungarian rider to wear the pink jersey.

== Major results ==
=== Mountain bike ===
2015
1st Cross-country, National Junior Championships
2016
1st Cross-country, National Junior Championships
2017
3rd Cross-country, National Championships

=== Road ===
2017
9th Overall Tour of Szeklerland
2018
National Under-23 Championships

1st Road race
1st Time trial

9th Road race, UEC European Under-23 Championships
2019 (1 pro win)
National Championships

1st Time trial
3rd Road race

1st Grand Prix Cycliste de Gemenc I
1st Stage 9 Tour de l'Avenir
2nd Overall Istrian Spring Trophy

1st Stage 1

2nd Overall Bałtyk–Karkonosze Tour

1st Young rider classification

2nd Grand Prix Cycliste de Gemenc II
3rd Overall Belgrade Banjaluka

1st Young rider classification

3rd Overall Tour de Hongrie
3rd Overall Tour of Antalya
4th Piccolo Giro di Lombardia
5th Overall Tour Alsace
7th Overall Carpathian Couriers Race
7th Overall Tour of Romania
8th Overall CCC Tour - Grody Piastowskie
10th Overall Sibiu Cycling Tour
2020 (2)
1st Overall Tour de Hongrie

1st Mountains classification
1st Stage 5

2nd Time trial, National Championships
10th Overall Tour des Alpes-Maritimes et du Var

1st Young rider classification

10th Gran Piemonte
2021
2nd Time trial, National Championships
Giro d'Italia

Held after Stages 6–8
Held after Stages 4–8

2022 (1)
1st Road race, National Championships
4th Strade Bianche
5th Overall Tour of the Alps
10th Mont Ventoux Dénivelé Challenge
2023 (2)
National Championships

1st Road race
1st Time trial

1st Stage 2 (TTT) Vuelta a Burgos
4th Overall Tour of Norway
4th Overall O Gran Camiño
5th Strade Bianche
2024 (1)
National Championships

1st Road race
2nd Time trial

4th Road race, Olympic Games
5th Overall UAE Tour
2025
2nd Time trial, National Championships
2026
10th Clásica Jaén Paraíso Interior

==== Grand Tour general classification results timeline ====
Grand Tour	2020	2021	2022	2023	2024
Giro d'Italia	27	14	35	—	22
Tour de France	—	—	—	—	—
Vuelta a España	—	—	—	22	25

==== Classics results timeline ====
Monument	2020	2021	2022	2023	2024	2025	2026
Milan–San Remo	—	—	—	34	—	35	
Tour of Flanders	—	—	—	—	—	—	
Paris–Roubaix	NH	—	—	—	—	—	
Liège–Bastogne–Liège	—	—	—	26	40	31	
Giro di Lombardia	OTL	12	DNF	22	46	—	
Classic	2020	2021	2022	2023	2024	2025	2026
Strade Bianche	—	—	4	5	19	22	70
Amstel Gold Race	NH	—	—	30	—	22	
Brabantse Pijl	—	—	—	—	—	—	
La Flèche Wallonne	—	—	—	11	—	39	
Clásica de San Sebastián	NH	—	—	—	—	57	
Bretagne Classic	—	—	—	—	—	—	
Grand Prix Cycliste de Québec	Not held		27	—	—	—	
Grand Prix Cycliste de Montréal	Not held		18	—	—	—	

==== Major championships timeline ====
Event		2019	2020	2021	2022	2023	2024
Olympic Games	Road race	Not held		DNF	Not held		4
Olympic Games	Time trial	Not held		—	Not held		22
World Championships	Road race	—	76	—	23	—	27
World Championships	Time trial	—	—	—	—	—	—
European Championships	Road race	—	—	DNF	—	—	—
European Championships	Time trial	—	—	—	—	—	—
National Championships	Road race	3	13	15	1	1	1
National Championships	Time trial	1	2	2	DNS	1	2

Legend
—	Did not compete
DNF	Did not finish
DNS	Did not start
OTL	Over the limit
