= János Pelikán =

Hungarian bicycle racer

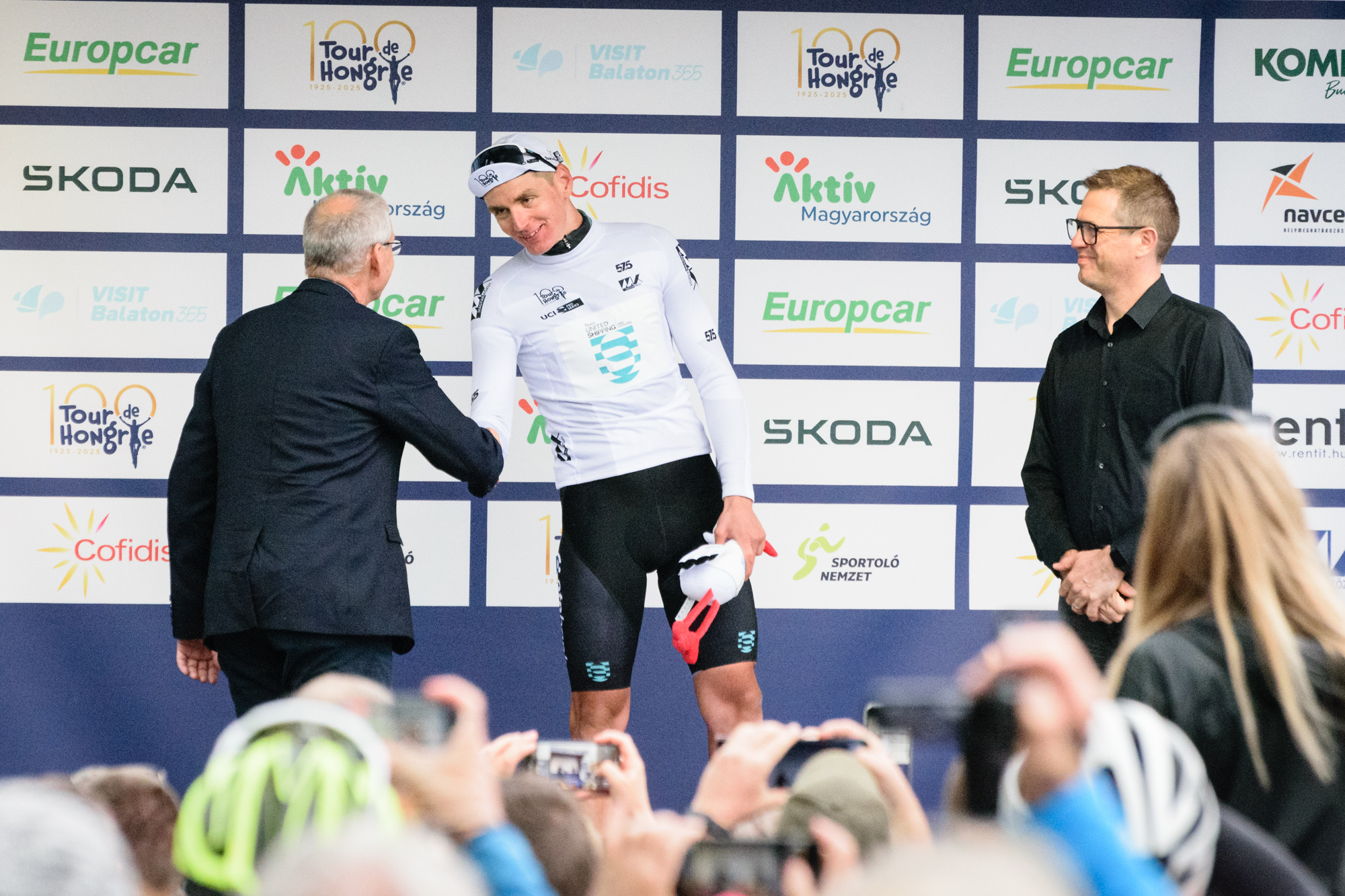
- János Pelikán at the 2025 Tour de Hongrie Stage 2 podium ceremony

Personal information
- Full name: János Zsombor Pelikán
- Born: 19 April 1995 (age 31) Budapest, Hungary
- Height: 1.89 m (6 ft 2 in)
- Weight: 76 kg (168 lb)

Cycling career
- Sport: Cycling
- Current team: Team United Shipping
- Discipline: Road
- Role: Rider
- Rider type: Time trialist

Amateur teams
- 2012–2014: Cube Balaton
- 2022: MBH Bank Cycling Team
- 2024: Team United Shipping

Professional teams
- 2014–2015: Utensilnord
- 2016–2018: Amplatz–BMC
- 2019: Pannon Cycling Team
- 2020–2021: Androni Giocattoli–Sidermec
- 2025–: Team United Shipping

János Zsombor Pelikán (born 19 April 1995) is a Hungarian cyclist.

== Major results ==
2012
1st Time trial, National Junior Road Championships
1st Stage 6 Tour of Pécs
2013
National Junior Road Championships

1st Road race
1st Time trial

2014
1st Time trial, National Under–23 Road Championships
2016
National Road Championships

1st Road race
1st Time trial

1st Road race, National Under–23 Road Championships
2017
National Road Championships

1st Time trial
4th Road race

1st Grand Prix Südkärnten
6th Overall Gemenc Grand Prix
2018
3rd Time trial, National Road Championships
7th Overall Okolo Jižních Čech
2019
1st V4 Special Series Debrecen–Ibrány
1st Stage 2 Tour de Serbie
2nd Time trial, National Road Championships
2nd V4 Special Series Vásárosnamény–Nyíregyháza
2021
1st Hungarian rider classification, Tour de Hongrie
1st Prologue Tour of Romania
2024
3rd Time trial, National Road Championships
2025
1st Time trial, National Road Championships
