= Péter Kusztor =

Hungarian cyclist (born 1984)

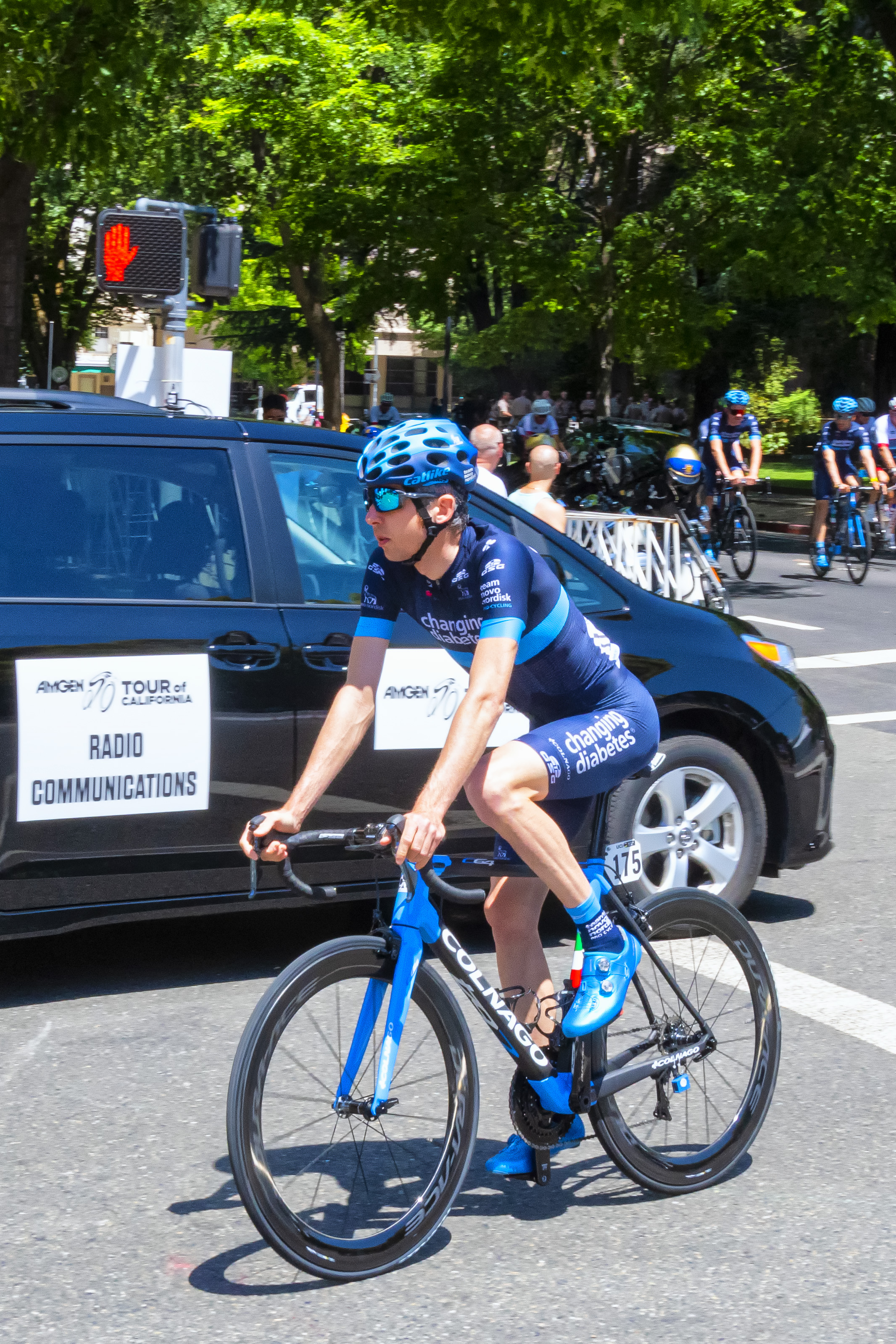
- Kusztor at the 2019 Tour of California

Personal information
- Full name: Péter Kusztor
- Born: 27 December 1984 (age 41) Budapest, Hungary
- Height: 1.79 m (5 ft 10 in)
- Weight: 61 kg (134 lb)

Cycling career
- Sport: Cycling
- Current team: Team Novo Nordisk
- Discipline: Road
- Role: Rider

Professional teams
- 2006–2008: P-Nívó Betonexpressz 2000 Kft.se
- 2009–2012: Atlas–Romer's Hausbäckerei
- 2013–2014: Utensilnord Ora24.eu
- 2014–2018: Amplatz–BMC
- 2019–: Team Novo Nordisk

Major wins
- One-day races and classics National Road Race Championships (2010, 2012) National Time Trial Championships (2010)

Péter Kusztor (born 27 December 1984 in Budapest) is a Hungarian racing cyclist, who currently rides for UCI ProTeam Team Novo Nordisk. He competed at the road race at the 2008 Summer Olympics finishing 65th. Kusztor won the 2010 and 2012 national road cycling championships.

== Major results ==
2005
National Road Championships

1st Under-23 time trial
3rd Time trial

2007
2nd Overall Grand Prix Cycliste de Gemenc

1st Prologue

2nd Overall Tour of Szeklerland

1st Prologue

7th Belgrade–Banja Luka I
10th Gran Premio San Giuseppe
2008
1st GP Hydraulika Mikolasek
1st Grand Prix Bradlo
1st GP Betonexpressz 2000
2nd Overall Okolo Slovenska
5th Trofeo Zsšdi
5th Grand Prix Kooperativa
9th Overall The Paths of King Nikola
9th Prague–Karlovy Vary–Prague
2009
3rd Overall Grand Prix Guillaume Tell
3rd Giro del Mendrisiotto
3rd Tour du Jura
5th Grand Prix Kooperativa
5th Raiffeisen Grand Prix
8th Overall Flèche du Sud
9th Overall Grand Prix Cycliste de Gemenc
10th Overall Okolo Slovenska
2010
National Road Championships

1st Time trial
1st Road race

2nd Giro del Mendrisiotto
6th Overall Tour de Bretagne
2011
1st Overall Tour de Bretagne
3rd Road race, National Road Championships
6th Overall Tour Alsace
7th Grand Prix de la ville de Nogent-sur-Oise
2012
1st Road race, National Road Championships
7th Giro del Veneto
2013
3rd Time trial, National Road Championships
4th Overall Sibiu Cycling Tour
4th Overall Tour of Szeklerland
7th Race Horizon Park 2
7th Grand Prix Královéhradeckého kraje
10th Central European Tour Miskolc GP
2014
National Road Championships

2nd Road race
3rd Time trial

2015
2nd Road race, National Road Championships
6th Overall East Bohemia Tour
7th Rund um Sebnitz
8th Raiffeisen Grand Prix
2016
1st Stage 4 Grand Prix Cycliste de Gemenc
3rd Time trial, National Road Championships
2017
2nd Overall Grand Prix Cycliste de Gemenc
9th GP Laguna
2018
1st V4 Special Series Debrecen–Ibrány
7th Overall Grand Prix Cycliste de Gemenc
2020
10th Overall International Tour of Rhodes
2023
9th Overall Tour du Rwanda
