= Veronika Kormos =

Hungarian cyclist

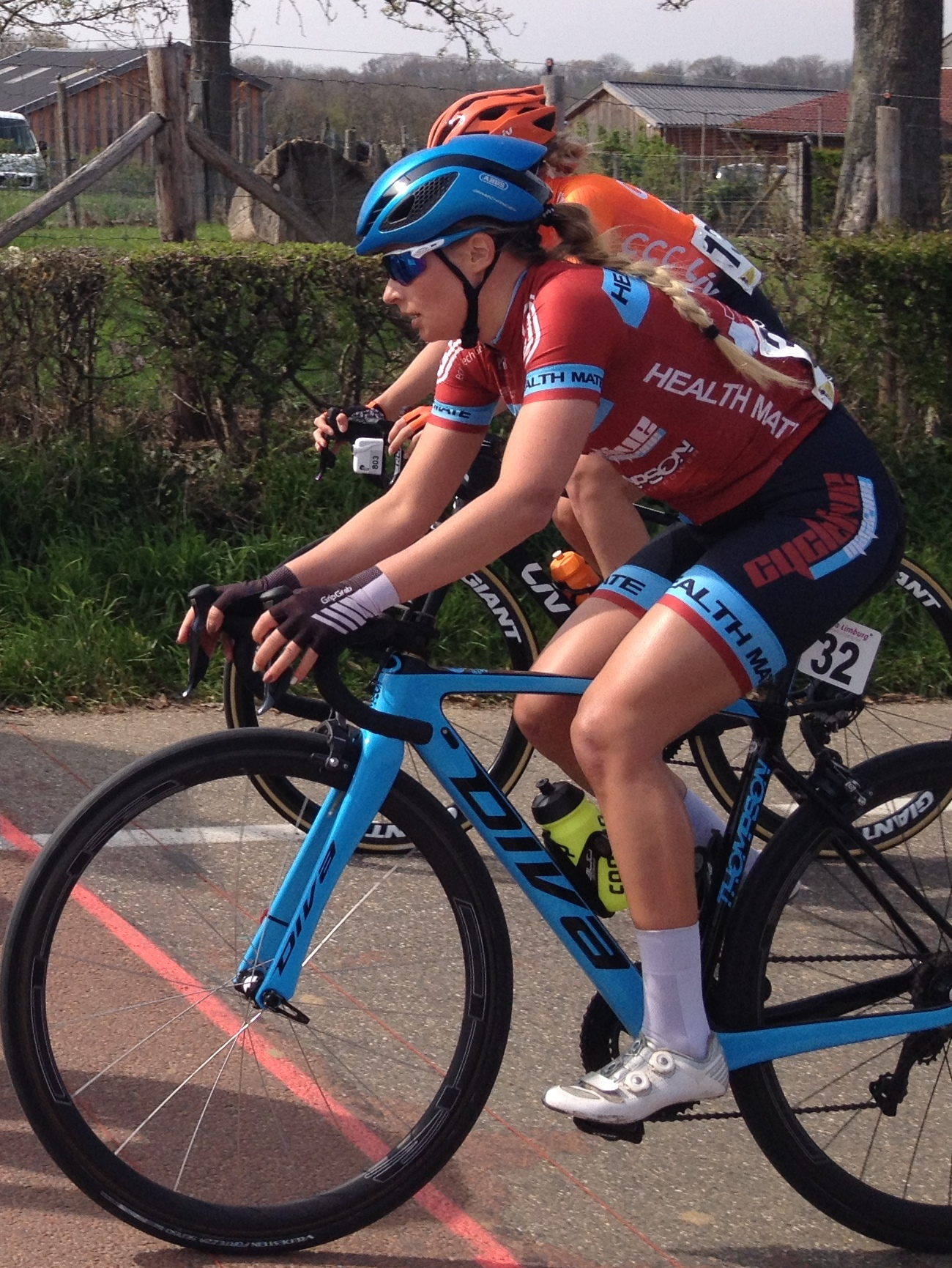
- Kormos in 2019

Personal information
- Full name: Veronika Anna Kormos
- Born: 17 August 1992 (age 34) Hungary

Cycling career
- Sport: Cycling
- Discipline: Road
- Role: Rider

Amateur teams
- 2015: Keukens Redant
- 2015: Team Stuttgart (guest)
- 2017: Maaslandster Veris CCN International Cycling Team
- 2018: DN 17 Nouvelle Aquitaine
- 2020: Andy Schleck Cycles–Immo Losch

Professional teams
- 2012: Team Duedi–Biemme Metal
- 2013: Sengers Ladies Cycling Team
- 2014: Bizkaia–Durango
- 2016: Lares–Waowdeals
- 2018–2019: Health Mate–Cyclelive Team
- 2021: Lviv Cycling Team
- 2021: Cogeas–Mettler–Look

Veronika Anna Kormos (born 17 August 1992) is a Hungarian racing cyclist, who most recently rode for UCI Women's Continental Team Cogeas–Mettler–Look.

Kormos was the winner of the 2014 Hungarian National Time Trial Championships, and also finished 3rd in the 2014 Hungarian National Road Race Championships. She rode at the 2014 UCI Road World Championships, but did not finish the race. She was dropped from the peloton after two laps and had to step out of the race after 50 kilometres (31 miles) together with her teammate Diána Szurominé Pulsfort. She also won the Hungarian National Time Trial Championships in 2015 and 2019.
