= Barnabás Peák =

Hungarian cyclist (born 1998)

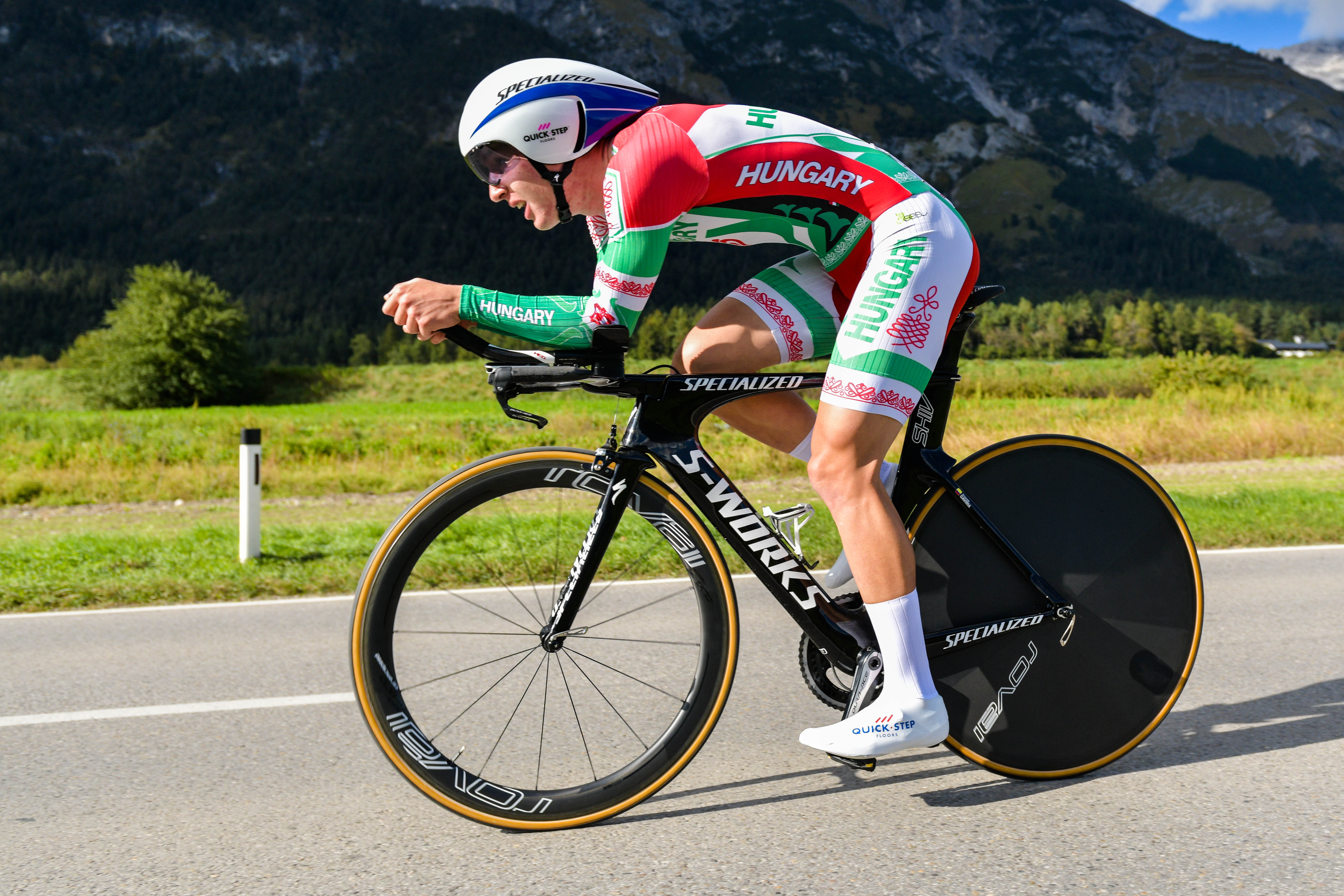
- Peák in 2018

Personal information
- Born: 29 November 1998 (age 27) Budapest, Hungary
- Height: 1.83 m (6 ft 0 in)
- Weight: 74 kg (163 lb)

Cycling career
- Sport: Cycling
- Current team: MBH Bank CSB Telecom Fort
- Discipline: Road
- Role: Rider
- Rider type: All-rounder

Amateur teams
- 2017–2018: World Cycling Centre
- 2018: Quick-Step Floors (stagiaire)
- 2019: Mitchelton–Scott (stagiaire)

Professional teams
- 2019: SEG Racing Academy
- 2020–2021: Mitchelton–Scott
- 2022: Intermarché–Wanty–Gobert Matériaux
- 2023: Human Powered Health
- 2024: Adria Mobil
- 2025: ATT Investments
- 2026–: MBH Bank CSB Telecom Fort

Major wins
- One-day races and classics National Time Trial Championships (2018, 2020, 2024, 2026) National Road Race Championships (2018)

Barnabás Peák (born 29 November 1998) is a Hungarian cyclist, who currently rides for UCI ProTeam MBH Bank CSB Telecom Fort.

In June 2019, Peák was announced to be joining UCI WorldTeam Mitchelton–Scott as a stagiaire during the 2019 season, before competing full-time with the team from 2020.

== Major results ==
2016
National Junior Road Championships

1st Road race
1st Time trial

1st Mountains classification, Grand Prix Général Patton
UEC European Junior Road Championships

7th Time trial
8th Road race

2017
1st Road race, National Under-23 Road Championships
1st Banja Luka–Belgrade I
2nd Time trial, National Road Championships
2nd Overall Tour de Hongrie

1st Young rider classification
1st Hungarian classification

5th GP Kranj
9th Törökbálint GP
2018
National Road Championships

1st Road race
1st Time trial

3rd Overall Vuelta al Bidasoa

1st Stage 2

7th Overall Tour de Serbie
9th Gran Piemonte
2019
1st Stage 5 Tour de Normandie
National Road Championships

2nd Road race
3rd Time trial

8th Grand Prix Cycliste de Gemenc II
2020
National Road Championships

1st Time trial
5th Road race

2021
5th Road race, National Road Championships
2022
National Road Championships

2nd Time trial
3rd Road race

2nd Ronde van Drenthe
3rd Visegrad 4 Kerékpárverseny
9th Tour du Doubs
2024
National Road Championships

1st Time trial
4th Road race

Visegrad 4 Bicycle Race

2nd GP Czech Republic
3rd GP Slovakia
10th Kerekparverseny

10th Trofej Umag
2025
3rd Time trial, National Road Championships
9th Ślężański Mnich
2026
National Road Championships

1st Time trial
5th Road race

=== Grand Tour general classification results timeline ===
Grand Tour	2021	2022
Giro d'Italia	—	110
Tour de France	—	—
Vuelta a España	—	—

=== Major championships timeline ===
Event		2018	2019	2020	2021	2022	2023	2024
Olympic Games	Road race	Not held			—	Not held		—
Olympic Games	Time trial	Not held			—	Not held		—
World Championships	Road race	—	—	—	DNF	—	—	
World Championships	Time trial	—	—	38	29	—	—	33
European Championships	Road race	—	—	—	DNF	58	—	—
European Championships	Time trial	—	—	—	23	19	—	—
National Championships	Road race	1	2	5	5	3	5	4
National Championships	Time trial	1	3	1	6	2	—	1

Legend
—	Did not compete
DNF	Did not finish
NH	Not held
OTL	Over time limit
