= Barbara Benkó =

Hungarian cyclist (born 1990)

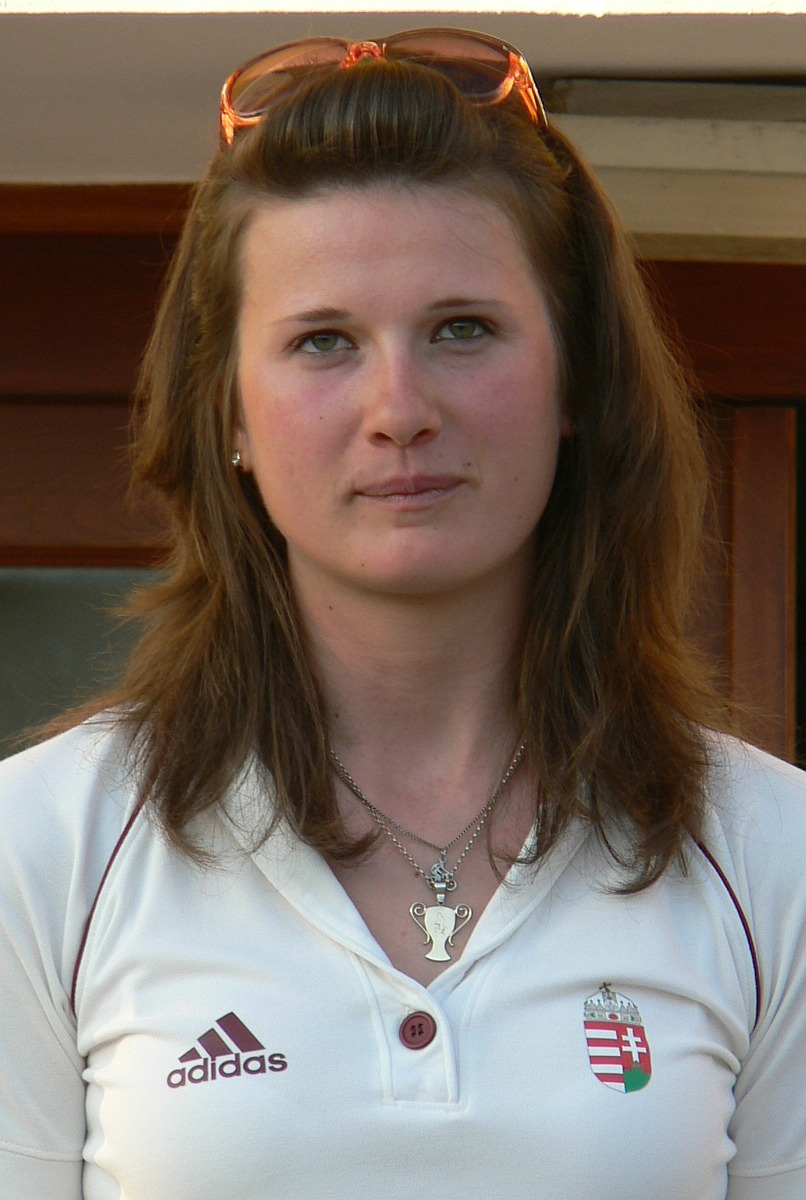
Benkó in 2012

Barbara Benkó (born 21 January 1990) is a Hungarian former cross-country mountain biker. Born in Budapest, Benko competed in the Women's cross-country at the 2012 Summer Olympics, held at Hadleigh Farm, finishing in 27th place.

== Major results ==
2008
2nd Junior cross-country, UCI Mountain Bike & Trials World Championships
2009
1st Cross-country, National Mountain Bike Championships
6th Cross-country, UEC European Under-23 Mountain Bike Championships
2010
1st Cross-country, National Mountain Bike Championships
3rd Time trial, National Road Championships
5th Cross-country, UEC European Under-23 Mountain Bike Championships
7th Under-23 cross-country, UCI Mountain Bike & Trials World Championships
2011
1st National Cyclo-cross Championships
2012
1st Cross-country, National Mountain Bike Championships
2013
1st Cross-country, National Mountain Bike Championships
2014
1st Cross-country, National Mountain Bike Championships
1st National Cyclo-cross Championships
World University Cycling Championship

2nd Cross-country
2nd Cross-country time trial

2nd Road race, National Road Championships
2015
1st Cross-country, National Mountain Bike Championships
1st National Cyclo-cross Championships
3rd Road race, National Road Championships
10th Cross-country, UEC European Mountain Bike Championships
2016
1st Cross-country, National Mountain Bike Championships
1st National Cyclo-cross Championships
2nd Road race, National Road Championships
2017
National Mountain Bike Championships

1st Cross-country marathon
1st Cross-country

1st National Cyclo-cross Championships
3rd Cross-country marathon, UEC European Mountain Bike Championships
9th Cross-country, UCI Mountain Bike World Championships
2018
1st Road race, National Road Championships
1st Cross-country, National Mountain Bike Championships
1st National Cyclo-cross Championships
5th Cross-country marathon, UEC European Mountain Bike Championships
2019
1st Cross-country, National Mountain Bike Championships
2nd National Cyclo-cross Championships
2020
National Road Championships

1st Time trial
3rd Road race

2nd Cross-country, National Mountain Bike Championships
2021
National Mountain Bike Championships

1st Cross-country short-track
2nd Cross-country

National Road Championships

2nd Time trial
2nd Road race
