= Csaba Steig =

Hungarian cyclist

Personal information
- Born: 12 June 1971 (age 55) Szekszárd, Hungary

Cycling career
- Sport: Cycling
- Current team: Retired
- Discipline: Road
- Role: Rider

Professional team
- 2006–2007: P-Nívó Betonexpressz 2000 Kft.se

Csaba Steig (born 12 June 1971) is a Hungarian former cyclist. He competed in the individual road race at the 1992 Summer Olympics.

== Major results ==
1991
1st Overall Grand Prix Cycliste de Gemenc
1992
1st Overall Grand Prix Cycliste de Gemenc
1996
3rd Road race, National Road Championships
1999
2nd Road race, National Road Championships
2000
2nd Road race, National Road Championships
2001
1st Road race, National Road Championships
2002
1st Stage 3 Paths of King Nikola
