= Márton Dina =

Hungarian cyclist (born 1996)

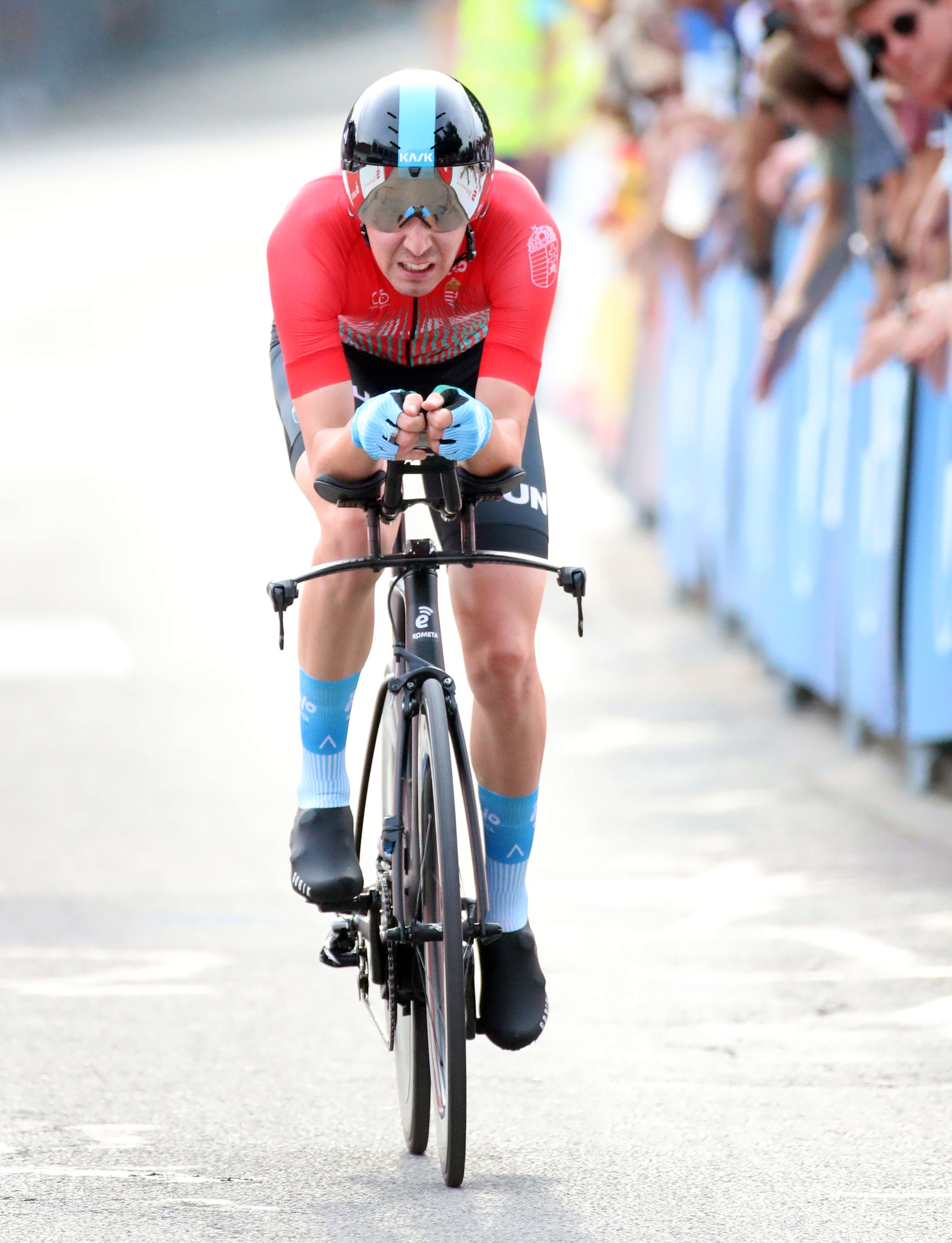

Personal information
- Full name: Márton Dina
- Born: 11 April 1996 (age 30) Budapest, Hungary
- Height: 1.86 m (6 ft 1 in)
- Weight: 67 kg (148 lb)

Cycling career
- Sport: Cycling
- Current team: MBH Bank CSB Telecom Fort
- Discipline: Road
- Role: Rider
- Rider type: Climber

Amateur team
- 2015–2017: Cube Csömör

Professional teams
- 2018–2019: Pannon Cycling Team
- 2019–2022: Kometa Cycling Team
- 2023–2024: ATT Investments
- 2025: Euskaltel–Euskadi
- 2026–: MBH Bank CSB Telecom Fort

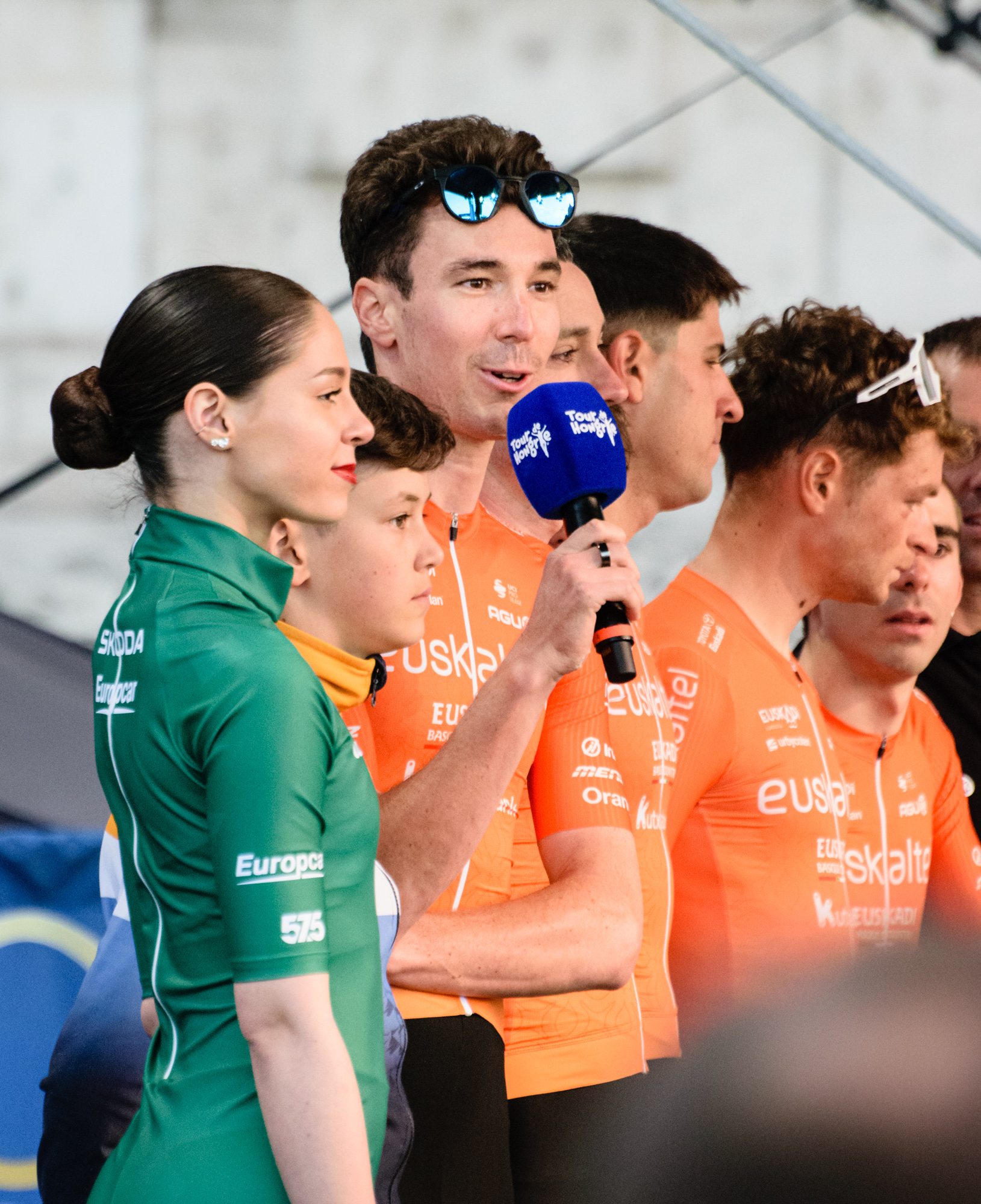
Márton Dina at the 2025 Tour de Hongrie team presentation

Márton Dina (born 11 April 1996) is a Hungarian cyclist who rides for UCI ProTeam MBH Bank CSB Telecom Fort.

== Major results ==
2016
2nd Road race, National Under-23 Road Championships
2018
2nd Road race, National Road Championships
5th Overall Carpathian Couriers Race
8th Road race, UEC European Under-23 Road Championships
2019
2nd Overall Tour de Hongrie
3rd Grand Prix Gazipaşa
5th Time trial, National Road Championships
8th Overall Tour of Rhodes
9th GP Adria Mobil
2020
9th Trofeo Serra de Tramuntana
2022
National Road Championships

2nd Road race
5th Time trial

2023
1st Overall Tour of Małopolska

1st Prologue & Stage 3

National Road Championships

2nd Road race
4th Time trial

3rd Overall Flèche du Sud
3rd GP Czech Republic
3rd Memoriał Jana Magiery
6th GP Polski
9th Overall Sibiu Cycling Tour
9th Overall Tour de la Mirabelle
2024
2nd Overall Tour of Małopolska

1st Prologue & Stage 1

3rd Road race, National Road Championships
4th Overall International Tour of Hellas
4th Overall South Aegean Tour
4th Overall Oberösterreich Rundfahrt
6th Overall Tour of Bulgaria

1st Mountains classification

6th Overall International Tour of Rhodes
9th Overall Tour of Austria
2025 (1 pro win)
1st Road race, National Road Championships
2026
9th Trofeo Alcide Degasperi

=== Grand Tour general classification results timeline ===
Grand Tour	2021
Giro d'Italia	100
Tour de France	—
Vuelta a España	—

Legend
—	Did not compete
DNF	Did not finish
