= Mónika Király =

Hungarian cyclist (born 1983)

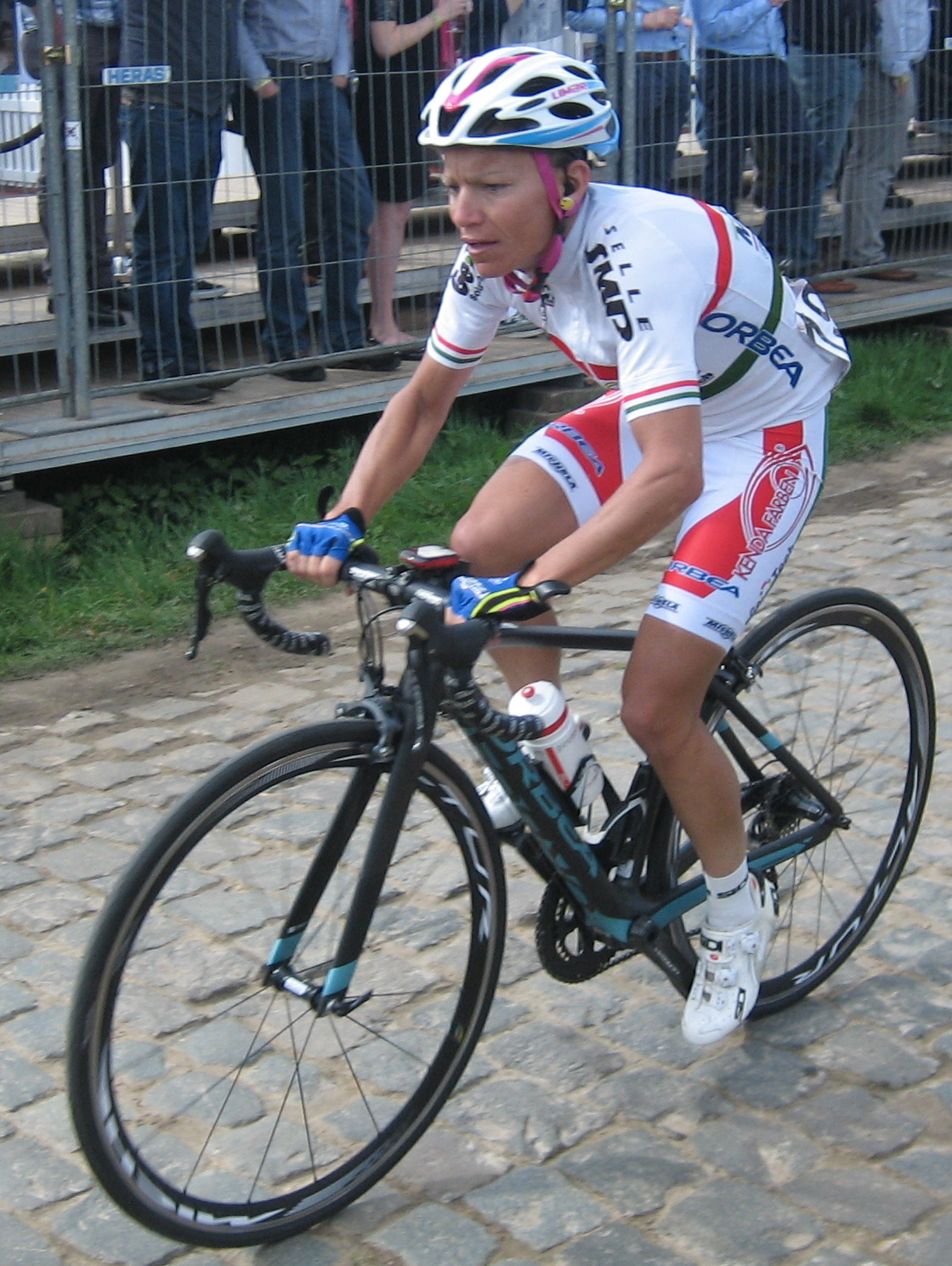
- Király at the 2017 Tour of Flanders for Women

Personal information
- Full name: Mónika Király
- Born: 10 November 1983 (age 42) Mosonmagyaróvár, Hungary

Cycling career
- Sport: Cycling
- Current team: Suspended
- Discipline: Road
- Role: Rider

Professional teams
- 2013: Squadra Scappatella
- 2016–2018: S.C. Michela Fanini Rox
- 2019–2020: Servetto–Piumate–Beltrami TSA

Mónika Király (born 10 November 1983) is a Hungarian road cyclist, who is currently suspended from the sport after a positive doping test for recombinant human erythropoietin (rhEPO). She represented her nation at four UCI Road World Championships between 2004 and 2018.

== Major results ==
2013
1st Time trial, National Road Championships
2015
National Road Championships

2nd Road race
3rd Time trial

2016
National Road Championships

1st Road race
1st Time trial

2017
National Road Championships

1st Road race
1st Time trial

5th Overall Giro della Toscana Int. Femminile – Memorial Michela Fanini
7th Giro del Trentino Alto Adige-Südtirol
2018
National Road Championships

2nd Road race
2nd Time trial

2019
10th Restart Zalaegerszeg, V4 Ladies Series
