= Petra Zsankó =

Hungarian cyclist (born 2001)

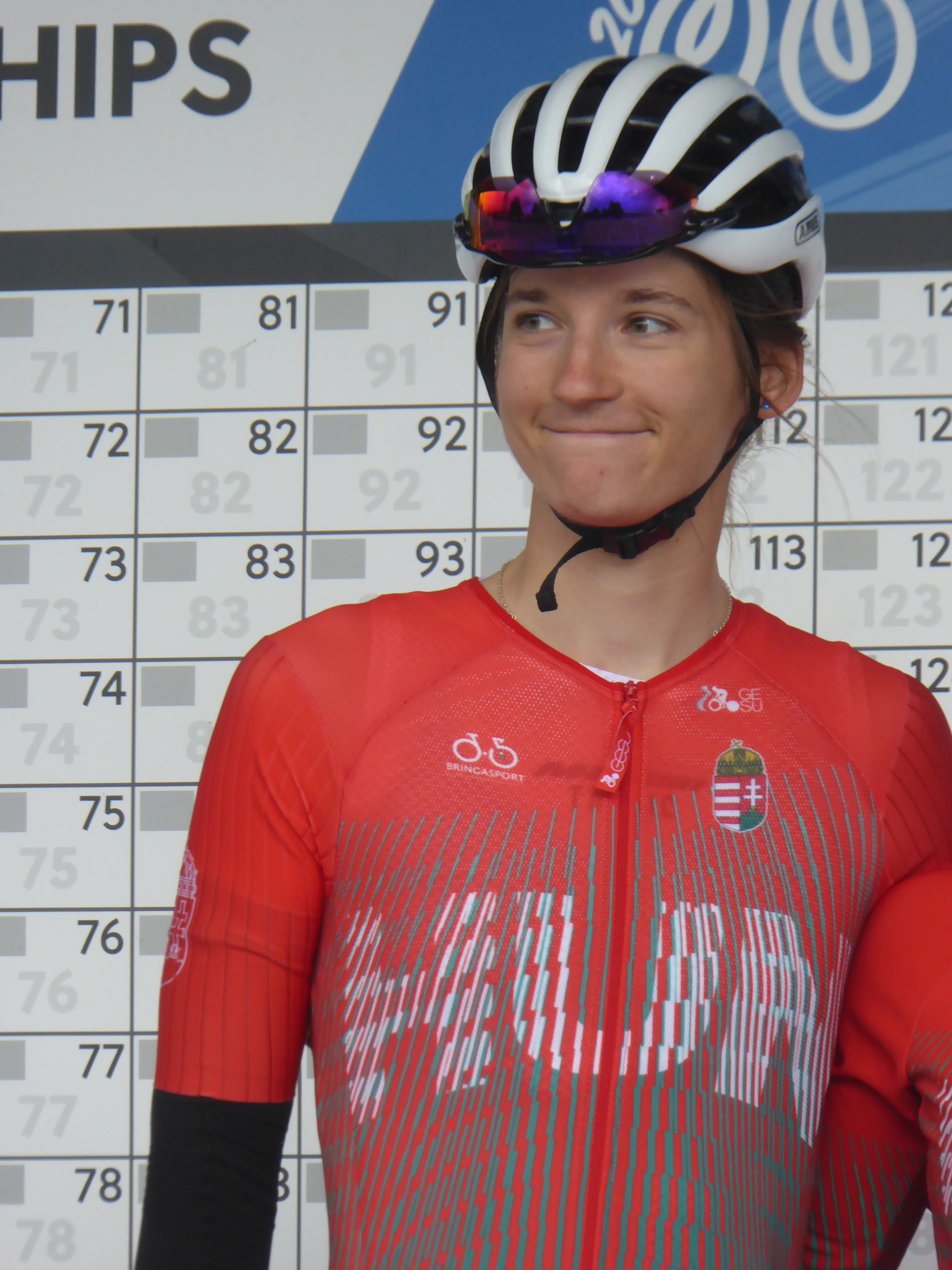
- Zsankó at the 2023 UCI Road World Championships

Personal information
- Born: 18 February 2001 (age 25) Szombathely, Hungary
- Height: 1.83 m (6 ft 0 in)

Cycling career
- Sport: Cycling
- Current team: Aromitalia Vaiano
- Discipline: Road
- Role: Rider

Amateur teams
- 2024: RC ARBÖ–Tom Tailor–RBK–Wörgl
- 2026: Dubai Police Cycling Team

Professional teams
- 2023: Massi–Tactic Women Team
- 2025: Ceratizit Pro Cycling
- 2026-: Aromitalia Vaiano

Major wins
- One-day races and classics National Time Trial Championships (2024, 2025, 2026) National Road Race Championships (2026)

Petra Zsankó (born 18 February 2001) is a Hungarian professional racing cyclist, who currently rides for UCI Women's Continental Team Aromitalia Vaiano.

== Major results ==
2021
National Road Championships

4th Time trial
4th Road race

2022
National Road Championships

2nd Time trial
3rd Road race

2023
National Road Championships

1st Under-23 time trial
2nd Road race

2024
World University Road Championships

1st Criterium
1st Time trial
6th Road race

National Road Championships

1st Time trial
2nd Road race

1st Poreč Trophy Ladies
2nd Belgrade GP Woman Tour
5th Groupama Ladies Race Slovakia
2025
National Road Championships

1st Time trial
2nd Road race

7th Trofeo Binissalem-Andratx
2026
National Road Championships

1st Time trial
1st Road race
