= Zsolt Dér =

Hungarian cyclist

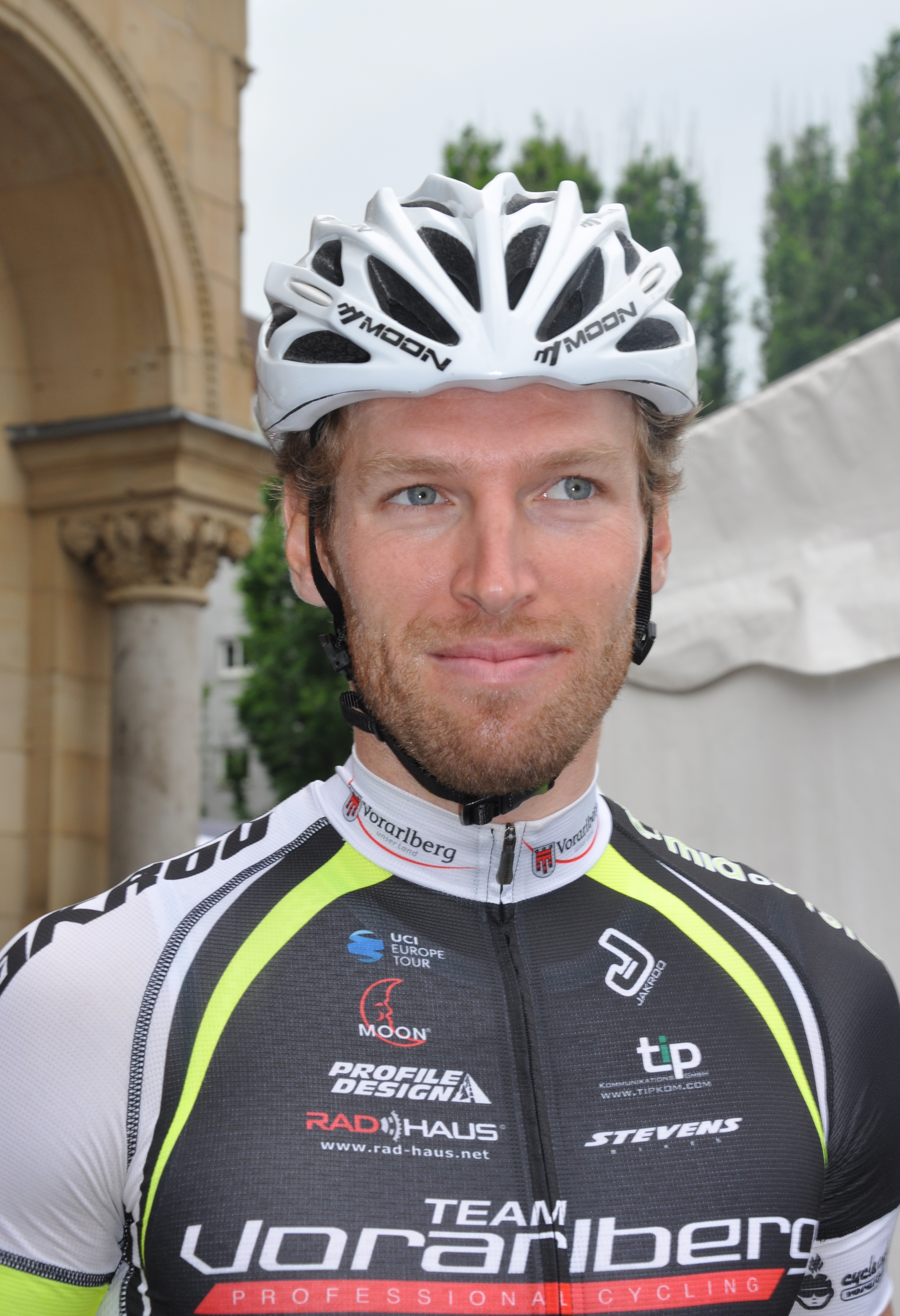
- Dér in 2016.

Personal information
- Full name: Žolt Dér
- Born: 25 March 1983 (age 43) Subotica, SFR Yugoslavia

Cycling career
- Sport: Cycling
- Current team: Retired
- Discipline: Road
- Role: Rider

Professional teams
- 2005: Team Nippo
- 2006: Cinelli–OPD
- 2007: P-Nívó Betonexpressz 2000 Kft.se
- 2008–2009: Centri della Calzatura–Partizan
- 2010: Partizan Srbija
- 2013–2015: Utensilnord Ora24.eu
- 2015: Start–Massi Cycling Team
- 2016–2017: Team Vorarlberg
- 2018: Beijing XDS–Innova Cycling Team

Zsolt Dér (Hungarian pronunciation: [ˈʒolt ˈdeːr]; Serbian: Žolt Der; born 25 March 1983) is a Serbian-born Hungarian former racing cyclist. He rode at the 2014 UCI Road World Championships. Following his retirement, Dér became a coach with the Hungarian Cycling Federation.

== Major results ==
2005
1st Road race, Serbia and Montenegro National Road Championships
8th Overall Tour of Greece
10th Overall Presidential Cycling Tour of Turkey
2006
1st Road race, Serbia and Montenegro National Road Championships
1st Stage 4 Tour de Serbie
2007
Serbian National Road Championships

1st Road race
2nd Time trial

1st Banja Luka–Belgrade II
1st GP Betonexpressz 2000
Presidential Cycling Tour of Turkey

1st Stages 5 & 7

1st Stage 2 Tour de Serbie
5th Classic Beograd–Čačak
5th GP Palma
10th Time trial, UCI B World Championships
2008
1st Stage 5 Tour de Serbie
Serbian National Road Championships

2nd Time trial
4th Road race

4th Grand Prix Bourgas
7th Classic Beograd–Čačak
10th Overall Vuelta Mexico
2009
Serbian National Road Championships

1st Time trial
4th Road race

1st Overall Grand Prix Cycliste de Gemenc
2nd Overall Tour de Serbie
2010
1st Road race, Serbian National Road Championships
1st Mayor Cup
1st Stage 3 Vuelta a Bolivia
5th Banja Luka–Belgrad II
6th Banja Luka–Belgrad I
9th Overall Five Rings of Moscow
2011
Serbian National Road Championships

1st Road race
1st Time trial

1st Tour of Vojvodina II
1st Stage 2b Tour of Greece
8th Central European Tour Miskolc GP
9th GP Betonexpressz 2000
2012
4th Overall Tour of Greece
4th Banja Luka–Belgrad I
5th Tour of Vojvodina I
6th Memorial Oleg Dyachenko
7th Banja Luka–Belgrad II
10th Tour of Vojvodina II
2013
Hungarian National Road Championships

2nd Road race
2nd Time trial

4th Race Horizon Park 1
5th Central European Tour Budapest GP
5th Classic Beograd–Čačak
6th Košice–Miskolc
6th Banja Luka–Belgrad I
7th Central European Tour Miskolc GP
8th Poreč Trophy
10th Croatia–Slovenia
2014
4th Road race, Hungarian National Road Championships
9th Memoriał Henryka Łasaka
10th Puchar Uzdrowisk Karpackich
2015
2nd Road race, Hungarian National Road Championships
2016
Hungarian National Road Championships

2nd Time trial
3rd Road race

2017
Hungarian National Road Championships

2nd Road race
3rd Time trial

10th Belgrade–Banja Luka II
