= Bálint Szeghalmi =

Hungarian cyclist

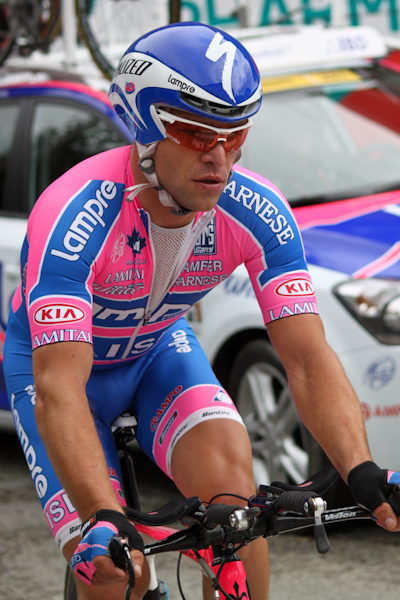
- Bálint Szeghalmi at the 2011 Critérium du Dauphiné

Personal information
- Born: 16 September 1980 (age 46) Budapest, Hungary
- Height: 1.7 m (5 ft 7 in)
- Weight: 66 kg (146 lb)

Cycling career
- Sport: Cycling
- Discipline: Road
- Role: Rider

Amateur teams
- 2016–2017: Dr. Bátorfi–Agria KTK
- 2018: Epronex–Bike Hungary

Professional teams
- 2007: Team Cornix
- 2008: Cinelli–OPD
- 2009–2010: Tusnad Cycling Team
- 2011: Lampre–ISD

Bálint Szeghalmi (born 16 September 1980) is a Hungarian former professional racing cyclist.

== Major results ==
2007
1st Road race, National Road Championships
1st Stage 2 Tour de Pécs
4th Overall Tour de Hongrie
2009
1st Stage 2 Turul Dobrogei
2nd Banja Luka–Belgrade II
7th GP Betonexpressz 2000
2010
1st Stage 2 Tolna Regio Kupa
2nd Road race, National Road Championships
2011
3rd Time trial, National Road Championships
