= Viktor Filutás =

Hungarian cyclist

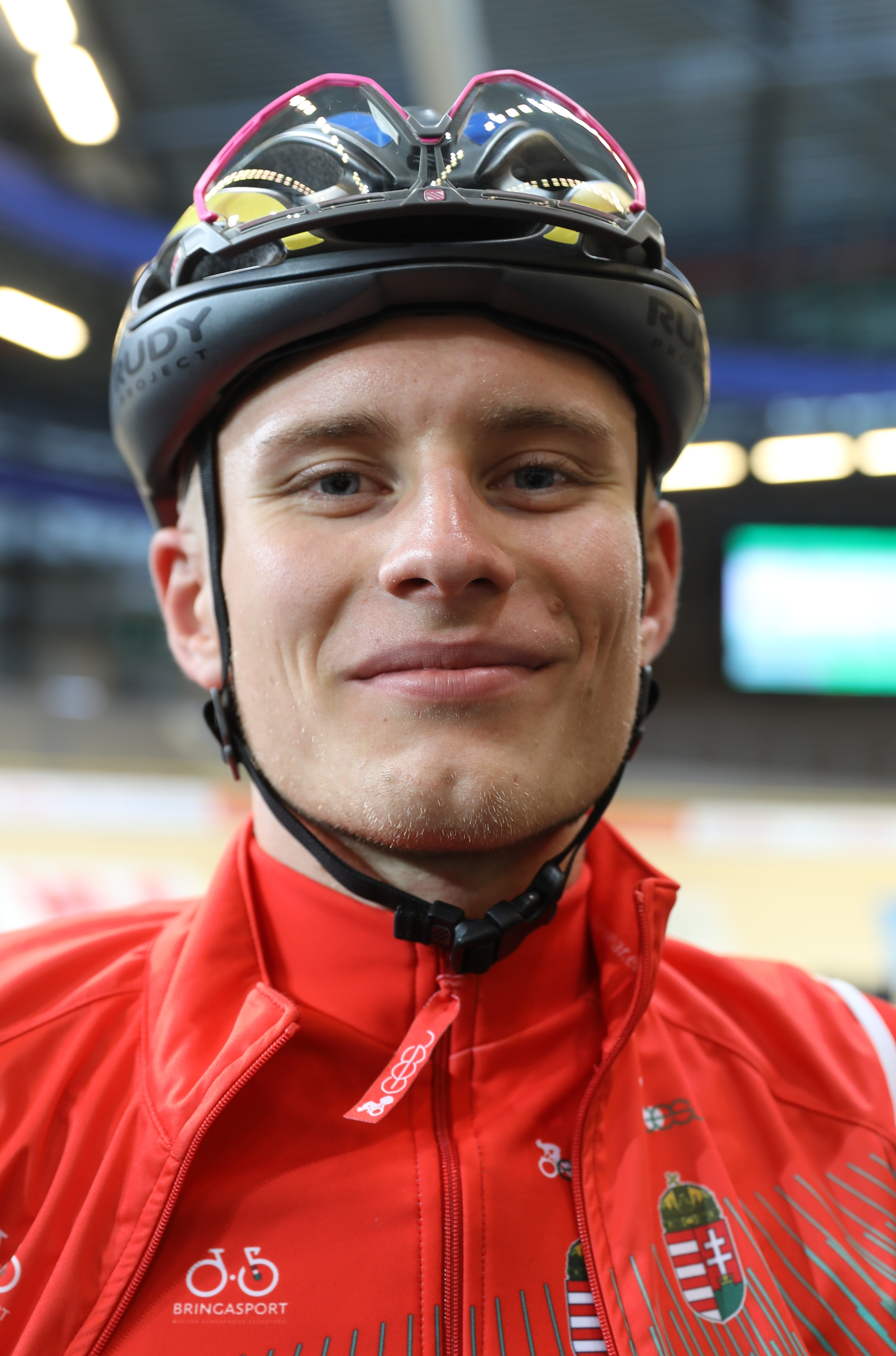
- Filutás in 2019

Personal information
- Born: 28 September 1996 (age 30) Budapest, Hungary
- Height: 1.79 m (5 ft 10 in)
- Weight: 68 kg (150 lb)

Cycling career
- Sport: Cycling
- Current team: Karcag Cycling
- Disciplines: Road; Track
- Role: Rider

Amateur teams
- 2016–2017: Szuper Concrete
- 2024–: Karcag Cycling

Professional teams
- 2015: Utensilnord
- 2018–2019: Pannon Cycling Team
- 2020–2021: Giotti Victoria
- 2022: Adria Mobil
- 2023: HRE Mazowsze Serce Polski

Viktor Filutás (born 28 September 1996) is a Hungarian racing cyclist, who currently rides for Hungarian club team Karcag Cycling. He rode in the men's points race at the 2020 UCI Track Cycling World Championships.

== Major results ==
2015
1st Time trial, National Under-23 Road Championships
2016
National Under-23 Road Championships

2nd Time trial
3rd Road race

2017
1st Time trial, National Under-23 Road Championships
7th Overall Gemenc Grand Prix
2019
4th Gemenc Grand Prix II
6th Overall Tour of Szeklerland
2020
National Road Championships

1st Road race
4th Time trial

4th Overall Tour of Romania
2021
1st Road race, National Road Championships
3rd Visegrad 4 Kerekparverseny
