= Imre Géra =

Hungarian cyclist (1947–2026)

Personal information
- Born: 6 March 1947 Abaújszántó, Hungary
- Died: 20 May 2026 (aged 79)
- Height: 5 ft 10 in (178 cm)
- Weight: 76 kg (168 lb)

Cycling career
- Sport: Cycling

Professional team
- Miskolci Vasutas Sport Club

Imre Géra (6 March 1947 – 20 May 2026) was a Hungarian cyclist. He competed at the 1968 Summer Olympics and the 1972 Summer Olympics.

Géra died on 20 May 2026, at the age of 79.
