= Éva Izsák =

Hungarian cyclist

Personal information
- Full name: Éva Izsák
- Born: 8 September 1967 (age 59) Mosonmagyaróvár, Hungary
- Height: 157 cm (5 ft 2 in)
- Weight: 50 kg (110 lb)

Cycling career
- Sport: Cycling
- Discipline: Road cycling
- Role: Rider

Éva Izsák (born 8 August 1967) is a road cyclist from Hungary. She represented her nation at the 1992 Summer Olympics in the women's road race.
