= Veronika Jéger =

Hungarian cyclist

Veronika Jeger
Personal information
- Born: 28 October 1969 (age 56) Hungary

Cycling career
- Sport: Cycling
- Discipline: Road cycling

Veronika Jeger (born 28 October 1969) is a road cyclist from Hungary. In 2001 and 2004 she won the Hungarian National Road Race Championships. She represented her nation at the 2004 UCI Road World Championships.
