= Ferenc Horváth (cyclist) =

Hungarian cyclist

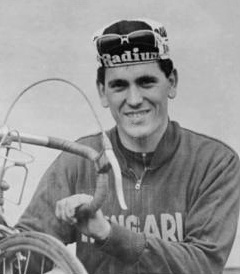
- Ferenc Horváth in 1960

Personal information
- Born: 11 August 1939 (age 87) Szany, Hungary
- Height: 1.74 m (5 ft 9 in)
- Weight: 66 kg (146 lb)

Cycling career
- Sport: Cycling

Ferenc Horváth (born 11 August 1939) is a retired Hungarian cyclist. He is born in Budapest, his profession is a Metalworker. He competed in the road race at the 1960 Summer Olympics, but failed to finish. He was third in the Tour de Hongrie in 1962.
