= Szuper Beton =

Cycling team (2010–2017)

Team information
- UCI code: UNA
- Registered: Republic of Ireland (2010–2012); Hungary (2013–2017)
- Founded: 2010
- Disbanded: 2017
- Discipline: Road
- Status: UCI Professional Continental (2010–2012); UCI Continental (2013–2015); Amateur (2016–2017)
- Bicycles: Bottecchia

Key personnel
- General manager: Ferenc Stubán

Team name history
- 2010 2011 2012 2013 2014–2015 2016 2017: De Rosa–Stac Plastic; De Rosa–Ceramica Flaminia; Utensilnord–Named; Utensilnord Ora24.eu; Utensilnord; Szuper Beton; Mugen Race–Veloki–Szuper Beton
Szuper Beton jersey
Jersey

Szuper Beton (UCI team code: UNA) was a UCI Continental cycling team, registered in Hungary. The team was founded in 2010 as De Rosa–Stac Plastic after the disappearance of LPR Brakes–Farnese Vini. The team held UCI Professional Continental status from 2010 to 2012, before dropping down to Continental in 2013. The team then downgraded to amateur status for its final two years of existence in 2016 and 2017.

== Team roster ==
As of 6 April 2015.

Rider	Date of birth
Zsolt Dér (HUN)	25 March 1983 (age 43)
Viktor Filutás (HUN)	28 September 1996 (age 29)
Gergo Gonczy (HUN)	2 July 1996 (age 30)
Botond Holló (HUN)	17 April 1992 (age 34)
Zoltán Lengyel (HUN)	25 April 1995 (age 31)

Rider	Date of birth
Daniel Moricz (HUN)	26 March 1996 (age 30)
János Pelikán (HUN)	19 April 1995 (age 31)
Tibor Roka (HUN)	20 May 1996 (age 30)
Balázs Rózsa (HUN)	26 November 1995 (age 30)
Zoltan Sipos (HUN)	15 December 1991 (age 34)

== Major wins ==
2010
Overall Giro della Provincia di Reggio Calabria, Matteo Montaguti

Stage 1, Matteo Montaguti

Gran Premio di Lugano, Roberto Ferrari
Giro del Friuli, Roberto Ferrari
Overall Tour of Japan, Cristiano Salerno

Stage 2 & 5, Cristiano Salerno
Stage 3 & 7, Claudio Cucinotta

Stage 5 Brixia Tour, Roberto Ferrari
Trofeo Matteotti, Riccardo Chiarini
2012
Stages 2 & 7 Vuelta a Colombia, Marco Zanotti
2013
Hungary Road Race Championships, Krisztián Lovassy
Giro del Medio Brenta, Federico Rocchetti
Central European Tour Budapest GP, Krisztián Lovassy
2014
Hungary Road Race Championships, Balázs Rózsa
2015
Hungary Time Trial Championships, Viktor Filutás
