= Tibor Debreceni =

Hungarian cyclist (1946–2023)

Personal information
- Born: 19 September 1946 Csepel, Hungary
- Died: 13 April 2023 (aged 76) Budapest, Hungary

Cycling career
- Sport: Cycling

Tibor Debreceni (19 September 1946 – 13 April 2023) was a Hungarian cyclist. He competed in the individual road race and team time trial events at the 1972 Summer Olympics.

Debreceni died in Budapest on 13 April 2023, at the age of 76.
