= Erik Fetter =

Hungarian cyclist (born 2000)

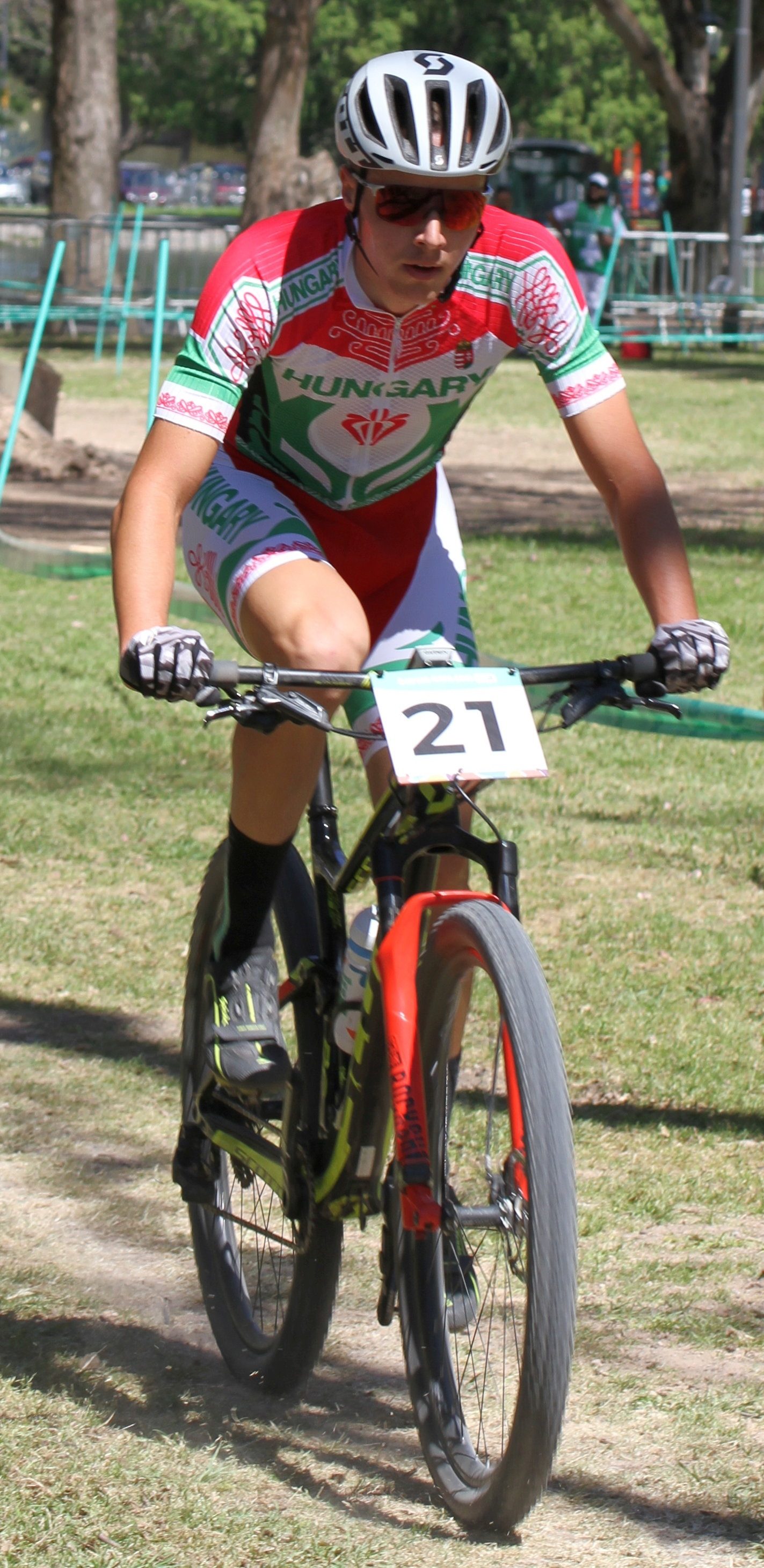
- Fetter at the 2018 Summer Youth Olympics

Personal information
- Full name: Erik Fetter
- Born: 5 April 2000 (age 26) Budapest, Hungary
- Height: 1.9 m (6 ft 3 in)
- Weight: 70 kg (154 lb)

Cycling career
- Sport: Cycling
- Current team: Team United Shipping
- Disciplines: Road; Cyclo-cross; Mountain bike
- Role: Rider
- Rider type: Climber

Professional teams
- 2019: Pannon Cycling Team
- 2020–2024: Kometa Xstra Cycling Team
- 2025–: Team United Shipping

Major wins
- One-day races and classics National Time Trial Championships (2021, 2022)

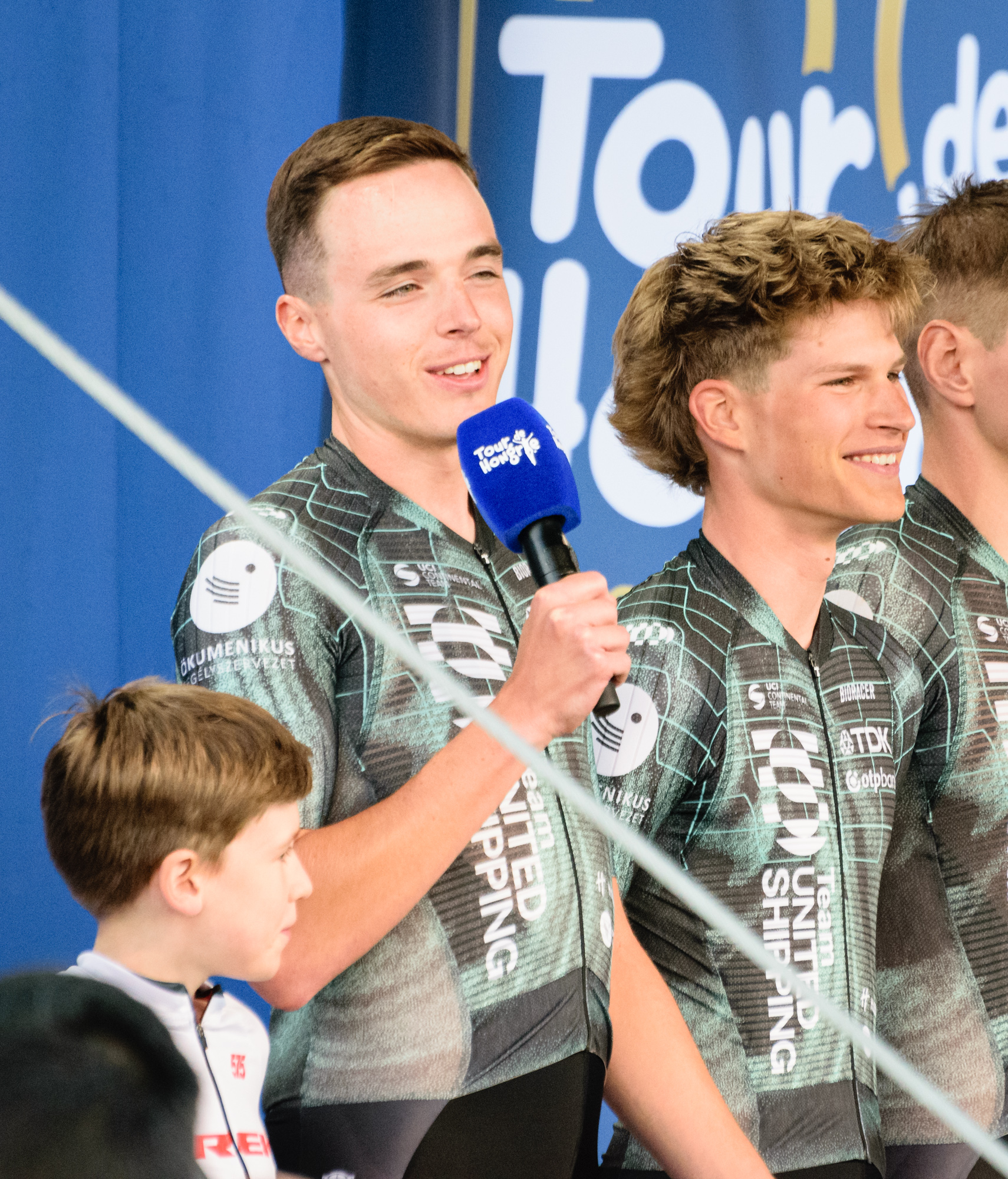
Erik Fetter at the 2025 Tour de Hongrie team presentation

Erik Fetter (born 5 April 2000) is a Hungarian cyclist, who currently rides for UCI Continental team Team United Shipping.

== Major results ==
2017
1st Cross-country, National Junior MTB Championships
2018
Summer Youth Olympics

1st MTB Short track
6th Road race

1st Cross-country, National Junior MTB Championships
2021 (2 pro wins)
1st Time trial, National Road Championships
1st Stage 4 Tour du Limousin
4th Road race, UEC European Under-23 Road Championships
2022 (1)
1st Time trial, National Road Championships
2nd Overall Okolo jižních Čech

1st Young rider classification

4th Road race, UEC European Under-23 Road Championships
2023
3rd Road race, National Road Championships
9th Overall CRO Race
2026 (1)
1st Stage 3 Okolo Slovenska

=== Grand Tour general classification results timeline ===
Grand Tour	2022	2023
Giro d'Italia	83	DNF
Tour de France	—	
Vuelta a España	—	

=== Major championships timeline ===
Event		2019	2020	2021	2022	2023
Olympic Games	Road race	Not held		—	Not held	
Olympic Games	Time trial	Not held		—	Not held	
World Championships	Road race	—	—	—	—	
World Championships	Time trial	—	—	—	—	
European Championships	Road race	—	—	—	—	
European Championships	Time trial	—	—	—	—	
National Championships	Road race	17	—	20	7	
National Championships	Time trial	11	—	1	1	

Legend
—	Did not compete
DNF	Did not finish
DNS	Did not start
OTL	Over the limit
