= Ferenc Keserű (cyclist) =

Hungarian cyclist (1946–2019)

Personal information
- Born: 12 December 1946 Pécs, Hungary
- Died: 12 February 2019 (aged 72)

Cycling career
- Sport: Cycling

Ferenc Keserű (12 December 1946 – 12 February 2019) was a Hungarian cyclist. He competed in the individual road race at the 1968 Summer Olympics.
