= Anita Rita Kenyó =

Hungarian cyclist

Personal information
- Born: 21 November 1981 (age 44) Hungary

Cycling career
- Sport: Cycling
- Discipline: Road cycling

Anita Rita Kenyó (born 21 November 1981) is a road cyclist from Hungary. She represented her nation at the 2011 UCI Road World Championships.
