= Diána Szurominé Pulsfort =

Hungarian cyclist

Personal information
- Born: 5 May 1983 (age 43)

Cycling career
- Sport: Cycling
- Current team: Retired
- Discipline: Road
- Role: Rider

Diána Szurominé Pulsfort (born 5 May 1983) is a Hungarian former racing cyclist. She competed in the 2013 UCI women's road race in Florence, and won the Hungarian National Road Race Championships three times, consecutively between 2013 and 2015.
