= Tamás Csathó =

Hungarian cyclist

Personal information
- Born: 10 March 1956 (age 70) Miskolc, Hungary

Cycling career
- Sport: Cycling

Tamás Csathó (born 10 March 1956) is a Hungarian former cyclist. He competed in the team time trial event at the 1980 Summer Olympics.
