= György Szuromi =

Hungarian cyclist

Personal information
- Born: 14 June 1951 (age 75) Budapest, Hungary

Cycling career
- Sport: Cycling

György Szuromi (born 14 June 1951) is a Hungarian former cyclist. He competed in the individual road race event at the 1980 Summer Olympics.
