= Zoltán Halász =

Hungarian cyclist (1960–2022)

Personal information
- Born: 23 June 1960 Szekszárd, Hungary
- Died: 9 August 2022 (aged 62)

Cycling career
- Sport: Cycling

Zoltán Halász (23 June 1960 – 9 August 2022) was a Hungarian cyclist. He competed in the individual road race and team time trial events at the 1980 Summer Olympics.
