= László Halász (cyclist) =

Hungarian cyclist

Personal information
- Born: 24 January 1959 (age 67) Szekszárd, Hungary

Cycling career
- Sport: Cycling

László Halász (born 24 January 1959) is a Hungarian former cyclist. He competed in the individual road race and team time trial events at the 1980 Summer Olympics.
