= 2016 Tour de Hongrie =

2016 UCI Europe Tour

Race details
- Dates: 28 June – 3 July
- Stages: 5 + Prologue
- Distance: 740 km (460 mi)
- Winning time: 16hr 34' 50"

Results
Jersey awarded to the overall winner	Winner	Mihkel Räim (EST)	(Cycling Academy)
	Second	Oleksandr Polivoda (UKR)	(Kolss BDC Team)
	Third	Daniel Turek (CZE)	(Cycling Academy)
Jersey awarded to the points classification winner	Points	Ahmed Galdoune (MAR)	(Delio Gallina Colosio)
Jersey awarded to the mountains classification winner	Mountains	Chris Butler (USA)	(Cycling Academy)
Jersey awarded to the youth classification winner	Youth	Žiga Ručigaj (SLO)	(Radenska–Ljubljana)
	Team	Cycling Academy	

The 2016 Tour de Hongrie was a six-day cycling stage race that took place in Hungary in June–July 2016. The race is the 37th edition of the Tour de Hongrie. It was rated as a 2.2 event as part of the 2016 UCI Europe Tour. The race included 5 stages plus the prologue, starting in Szombathely on 28 June and returning there for the finish on 3 July in Budapest.

The winner of overall classification was Mihkel Räim. The selection was made on Stage 1 to Keszthely.

== Schedule ==
Stage characteristics and winners
Stage	Date	Course	Distance	Type	Winner
P	28 June	Szombathely	1 km (0.6 mi)	Individual time trial	Sándor Szalontay (HUN)
1	29 June	Fertőd to Keszthely	133 km (83 mi)	Flat stage	Mihkel Räim (EST)
2	30 June	Keszthely to Siófok	164 km (102 mi)	Flat stage	Ahmed Galdoune (MAR)
3	1 July	Cegléd to Karcag	185 km (115 mi)	Flat stage	Gediminas Kaupas (LTU)
4	2 July	Karcag to Gyöngyös (Kékestető)	144 km (89 mi)	Intermediate stage	Chris Butler (USA)
5	3 July	Gyöngyös to Budapest	113 km (70 mi)	Hilly stage	Rok Korošec (SLO)
Total			740 km (460 mi)		

== Participating teams ==
16 teams were invited to the 2016 Tour de Hongrie: 7 UCI Continental, 4 Regional and 5 Hungarian teams.

UCI Continental teams

- Differdange–Losch
- Team FixIT.no
- Kolss BDC Team
- Radenska–Ljubljana
- Start–Vaxes Cycling Team
- Tuşnad Cycling Team
- Cycling Academy

Other teams

- DKSI-Kontent
- Dr. Bátorfi-Agria Ktk.
- Epronex Special-Bikes Team
- MugenRace Team Prolog Forman Cinelli
- Szuper Beton
- West-Frisia
- Embrace The World Cycling
- Forman-Cinelli
- Delio Gallina Colosio

== Stages ==
=== Prologue ===
28 June 2016 — Szombathely, 1 km (0.6 mi), individual time trial (ITT)

Prologue Result and General Classification after Prologue
Rank	Rider	Team	Time
1	Sándor Szalontay (HUN)	Dr. Bátorfi-Agria Ktk.	1' 05"
2	Mihkel Räim (EST)	Cycling Academy	+ 0"
3	Martin Otoničar (SLO)	Delio Gallina Colosio	+ 0"
4	Mattia De Mori (ITA)	Delio Gallina Colosio	+ 1"
5	Robert Jenko (SLO)	Radenska–Ljubljana	+ 1"
6	Krisztián Lovassy (HUN)	Differdange–Losch	+ 2"
7	Jure Miškulin (SLO)	Radenska–Ljubljana	+ 2"
8	Benjamin Stauder (GER)	Embrace The World Cycling	+ 2"
9	Adrian Gjølberg (NOR)	Team FixIT.no	+ 2"
10	Ahmed Galdoune (MAR)	Delio Gallina Colosio	+ 3"

=== Stage 1 ===
29 June 2016 — Fertőd (Eszterházy Palace) to Keszthely (Festetics Palace), 131 km (81.4 mi)

Result of Stage 1
Rank	Rider	Team	Time
1	Mihkel Räim (EST)	Cycling Academy	2h 51' 01"
2	Oleksandr Polivoda (UKR)	Kolss BDC Team	+ 0"
3	Adrian Gjølberg (NOR)	Team FixIT.no	+ 3"
4	Daniel Turek (CZE)	Cycling Academy	+ 4"
5	Rok Korošec (SLO)	Radenska–Ljubljana	+ 53"
6	Ahmed Galdoune (MAR)	Delio Gallina Colosio	+ 55"
7	Daniel Crista (ROU)	Tuşnad Cycling Team	+ 55"
8	Dan Craven (NAM)	Cycling Academy	+ 57"
9	Guy Gabay (ISR)	Cycling Academy	+ 57"
10	Gabriel Reguero (ESP)	Differdange–Losch	+ 57"

General classification after Stage 1
Rank	Rider	Team	Time
1	Mihkel Räim (EST)	Cycling Academy	2h 51' 56"
2	Adrian Gjølberg (NOR)	Team FixIT.no	+ 11"
3	Oleksandr Polivoda (UKR)	Kolss BDC Team	+ 14"
4	Daniel Turek (CZE)	Cycling Academy	+ 20"
5	Rok Korošec (SLO)	Radenska–Ljubljana	+ 1' 06"
6	Ahmed Galdoune (MAR)	Delio Gallina Colosio	+ 1' 08"
7	Daniel Crista (ROU)	Tuşnad Cycling Team	+ 1' 11"
8	Gabriel Reguero (ESP)	Differdange–Losch	+ 1' 12"
9	Guy Gabay (ISR)	Cycling Academy	+ 1' 13"
10	Adne van Engelen (NED)	West-Frisia	+ 1' 14"

=== Stage 2 ===
30 June 2016 — Keszthely to Siófok, 165 km (102.5 mi)

Result of Stage 2
Rank	Rider	Team	Time
1	Ahmed Galdoune (MAR)	Delio Gallina Colosio	3h 54' 36"
2	Vasyl Malynivskyi (UKR)	Kolss BDC Team	+ 0"
3	Lorenz Fiege (GER)	Embrace The World Cycling	+ 0"
4	Kristoffer Madsen (NOR)	Team FixIT.no	+ 0"
5	Dex Groen (NED)	West-Frisia	+ 0"
6	Robert Jenko (SLO)	Radenska–Ljubljana	+ 0"
7	Mihkel Räim (EST)	Cycling Academy	+ 0"
8	Joury Ottenbros (NED)	West-Frisia	+ 0"
9	Patrick Dolleschall (AUT)	Epronex Special-Bikes Team	+ 0"
10	Adrian Gjølberg (NOR)	Team FixIT.no	+ 0"

General classification after Stage 2
Rank	Rider	Team	Time
1	Mihkel Räim (EST)	Cycling Academy	6h 46' 32"
2	Adrian Gjølberg (NOR)	Team FixIT.no	+ 11"
3	Oleksandr Polivoda (UKR)	Kolss BDC Team	+ 14"
4	Daniel Turek (CZE)	Cycling Academy	+ 20"
5	Ahmed Galdoune (MAR)	Delio Gallina Colosio	+ 58"
6	Rok Korošec (SLO)	Radenska–Ljubljana	+ 1' 06"
7	Daniel Crista (ROU)	Tuşnad Cycling Team	+ 1' 11"
8	Gabriel Reguero (ESP)	Differdange–Losch	+ 1' 12"
9	Guy Gabay (ISR)	Cycling Academy	+ 1' 13"
10	Adne van Engelen (NED)	West-Frisia	+ 1' 14"

=== Stage 3 ===
1 July 2016 — Cegléd to Karcag, 186 km (115.6 mi)

Result of Stage 3
Rank	Rider	Team	Time
1	Gediminas Kaupas (LTU)	Differdange–Losch	4h 22' 55"
2	Bruno Maltar (CRO)	Radenska–Ljubljana	+ 1"
3	Ahmed Galdoune (MAR)	Delio Gallina Colosio	+ 1"
4	Rok Korošec (SLO)	Radenska–Ljubljana	+ 1"
5	Mihkel Räim (EST)	Cycling Academy	+ 1"
6	Dex Groen (NED)	West-Frisia	+ 1"
7	Vasyl Malynivskyi (UKR)	Kolss BDC Team	+ 1"
8	Alessandro Bresciani (ITA)	Delio Gallina Colosio	+ 1"
9	Patrick Dolleschall (AUT)	Epronex Special- Bikes Team	+ 1"
10	Filippo Fiorelli (ITA)	Delio Gallina Colosio	+ 1"

General classification after Stage 3
Rank	Rider	Team	Time
1	Mihkel Räim (EST)	Cycling Academy	11h 09' 28"
2	Adrian Gjølberg (NOR)	Team FixIT.no	+ 15"
3	Oleksandr Polivoda (UKR)	Kolss BDC Team	+ 18"
4	Daniel Turek (CZE)	Cycling Academy	+ 24"
5	Ahmed Galdoune (MAR)	Delio Gallina Colosio	+ 54"
6	Rok Korošec (SLO)	Radenska–Ljubljana	+ 1' 06"
7	Guy Gabay (ISR)	Cycling Academy	+ 1' 13"
8	Daniel Crista (ROU)	Tuşnad Cycling Team	+ 1' 15"
9	Gabriel Reguero (ESP)	Differdange–Losch	+ 1' 16"
10	Adne van Engelen (NED)	West-Frisia	+ 1' 18"

=== Stage 4 ===
2 July 2016 — Karcag to Kékestető, 137 km (85.1 mi)

Result of Stage 4
Rank	Rider	Team	Time
1	Chris Butler (USA)	Cycling Academy	3h 23' 44"
2	Gabriel Reguero (ESP)	Differdange–Losch	+ 31"
3	Devid Tintori (ITA)	Differdange–Losch	+ 34"
4	Mihkel Räim (EST)	Cycling Academy	+ 35"
5	Daniel Turek (CZE)	Cycling Academy	+ 35"
6	Oleksandr Polivoda (UKR)	Kolss BDC Team	+ 35"
7	Åsmund Romstad Løvik (NOR)	Team FixIT.no	+ 39"
8	Adne van Engelen (NED)	West-Frisia	+ 43"
9	Matteo Spreafico (ITA)	Kolss BDC Team	+ 49"
10	Martín Lestido (ESP)	Tuşnad Cycling Team	+ 54"

General classification after Stage 4
Rank	Rider	Team	Time
1	Mihkel Räim (EST)	Cycling Academy	14h 33' 47"
2	Oleksandr Polivoda (UKR)	Kolss BDC Team	+ 18"
3	Daniel Turek (CZE)	Cycling Academy	+ 24"
4	Gabriel Reguero (ESP)	Differdange–Losch	+ 1' 12"
5	Adne van Engelen (NED)	West-Frisia	+ 1' 26"
6	Rok Korošec (SLO)	Radenska–Ljubljana	+ 1' 44"
7	Adrian Gjølberg (NOR)	Team FixIT.no	+ 1' 53"
8	Daniel Crista (ROU)	Tuşnad Cycling Team	+ 3' 16"
9	Chris Butler (USA)	Cycling Academy	+ 3' 40"
10	Devid Tintori (ITA)	Differdange–Losch	+ 3' 51"

=== Stage 5 ===
3 July 2016 — Gyöngyös to Budapest (Buda Castle), 99 km (61.5 mi)

Result of Stage 5
Rank	Rider	Team	Time
1	Rok Korošec (SLO)	Radenska–Ljubljana	2h 01' 01"
2	Ahmed Galdoune (MAR)	Delio Gallina Colosio	+ 2"
3	Krisztián Lovassy (HUN)	Differdange–Losch	+ 2"
4	Mihkel Räim (EST)	Cycling Academy	+ 2"
5	Filippo Tagliani (ITA)	Delio Gallina Colosio	+ 2"
6	Devid Tintori (ITA)	Differdange–Losch	+ 2"
7	Åsmund Romstad Løvik (NOR)	Team FixIT.no	+ 2"
8	Oleksandr Polivoda (UKR)	Kolss BDC Team	+ 2"
9	Vasyl Malynivskyi (UKR)	Kolss BDC Team	+ 5"
10	Daniel Turek (CZE)	Cycling Academy	+ 5"

Final general classification
Rank	Rider	Team	Time
1	Mihkel Räim (EST)	Cycling Academy	16h 34' 50"
2	Oleksandr Polivoda (UKR)	Kolss BDC Team	+ 18"
3	Daniel Turek (CZE)	Cycling Academy	+ 20"
4	Gabriel Reguero (ESP)	Differdange–Losch	+ 1' 21"
5	Rok Korošec (SLO)	Radenska–Ljubljana	+ 1' 32"
6	Adne van Engelen (NED)	West-Frisia	+ 3' 23"
7	Daniel Crista (ROU)	Tuşnad Cycling Team	+ 3' 25"
8	Adrian Gjølberg (NOR)	Team FixIT.no	+ 3' 50"
9	Devid Tintori (ITA)	Differdange–Losch	+ 4' 00"
10	Åsmund Romstad Løvik (NOR)	Team FixIT.no	+ 4' 06"

== Classification leadership ==
Classification leadership by stage
Stage	Winner	General classification	Points classification	Mountains classification	Young rider classification	Team classification
P	Sándor Szalontay	Sándor Szalontay	Mihkel Räim	Mattia De Mori	Martin Otoničar	Delio Gallina Colosio
1	Mihkel Räim	Mihkel Räim	Mihkel Räim	Adrian Gjølberg	Ahmed Galdoune	Cycling Academy
2	Ahmed Galdoune	Mihkel Räim	Mihkel Räim	Adrian Gjølberg	Ahmed Galdoune	Cycling Academy
3	Gediminas Kaupas	Mihkel Räim	Ahmed Galdoune	Adrian Gjølberg	Ahmed Galdoune	Cycling Academy
4	Chris Butler	Mihkel Räim	Ahmed Galdoune	Chris Butler	Josep Miralles	Cycling Academy
5	Rok Korošec	Mihkel Räim	Ahmed Galdoune	Chris Butler	Žiga Ručigaj	Cycling Academy
Final		Mihkel Räim	Ahmed Galdoune	Chris Butler	Žiga Ručigaj	Cycling Academy

== Final standings ==
Legend
Yellow jersey	Denotes the leader of the general classification	Green jersey	Denotes the leader of the points classification
Red jersey	Denotes the leader of the mountains classification	White jersey	Denotes the leader of the young rider classification

=== General classification ===
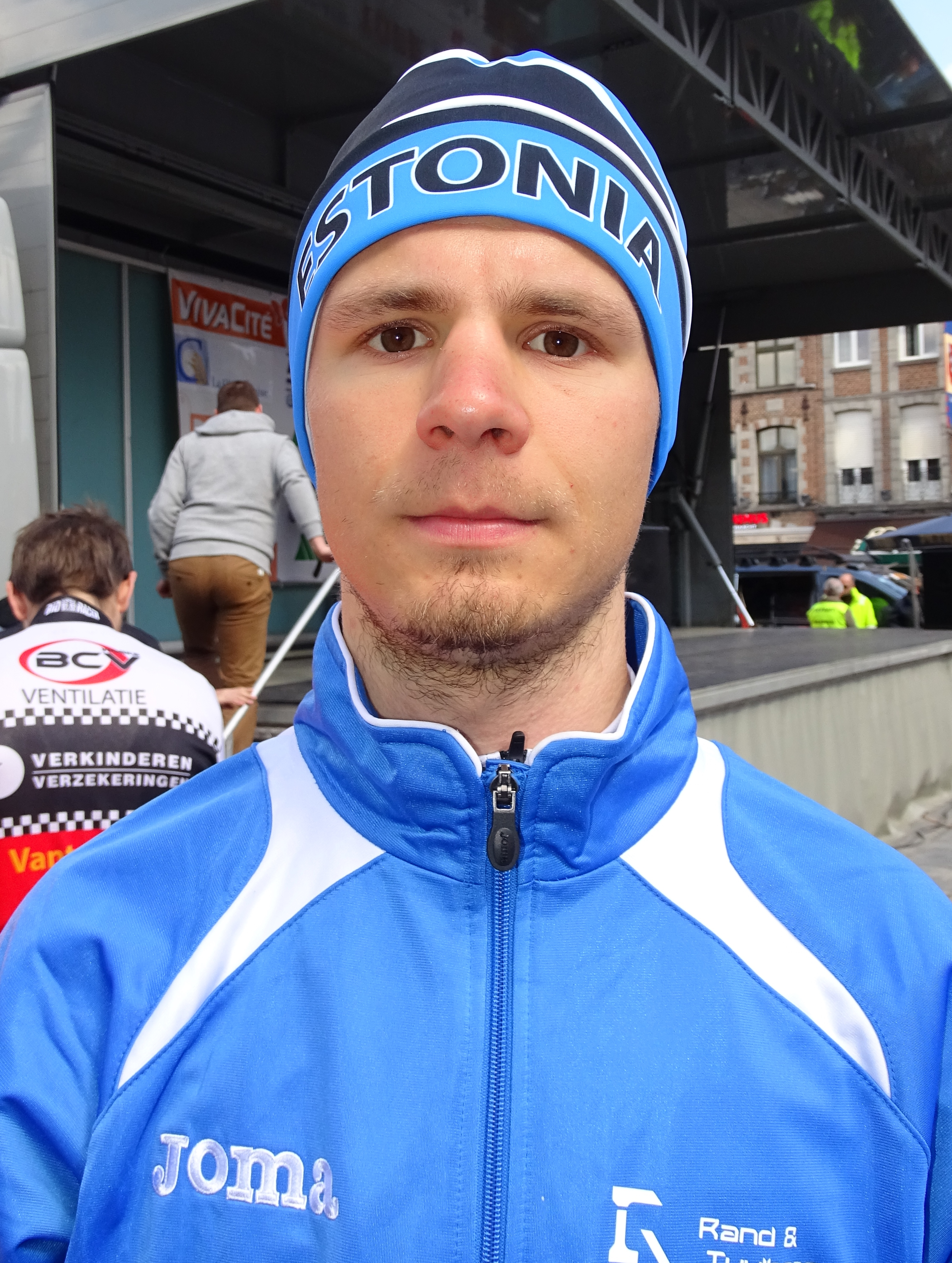
Mihkel Räim

General classification (1–10)
Rank	Rider	Team	Time
1	Mihkel Räim (EST)	Cycling Academy	16h 34' 50"
2	Oleksandr Polivoda (UKR)	Kolss BDC Team	+ 18"
3	Daniel Turek (CZE)	Cycling Academy	+ 20"
4	Gabriel Reguero (ESP)	Differdange–Losch	+ 1' 21"
5	Rok Korošec (SLO)	Radenska–Ljubljana	+ 1' 32"
6	Adne van Engelen (NED)	West-Frisia	+ 3' 23"
7	Daniel Crista (ROU)	Tuşnad Cycling Team	+ 3' 25"
8	Adrian Gjølberg (NOR)	Team FixIT.no	+ 3' 50"
9	Devid Tintori (ITA)	Differdange–Losch	+ 4' 00"
10	Åsmund Romstad Løvik (NOR)	Team FixIT.no	+ 4' 06"

=== Points classification ===
Points classification (1–10)
Rank	Rider	Team	Points
1	Ahmed Galdoune (MAR)	Delio Gallina Colosio	3
2	Mihkel Räim (EST)	Cycling Academy	17
3	Rok Korošec (SLO)	Radenska–Ljubljana	17
4	Gediminas Kaupas (LTU)	Differdange–Losch	13
5	Julian Hellmann (GER)	Embrace The World Cycling	12
6	Oleksandr Polivoda (UKR)	Kolss BDC Team	6
7	Vasyl Malynivskyi (UKR)	Kolss BDC Team	6
8	Krisztián Lovassy (HUN)	Differdange–Losch	6
9	Bruno Maltar (CRO)	Radenska–Ljubljana	6
10	Andreas Leppert (GER)	Embrace The World Cycling	5

=== Mountains classification ===
Mountains classification (1–10)
Rank	Rider	Team	Points
1	Chris Butler (USA)	Cycling Academy	15
2	Gabriel Reguero (ESP)	Differdange–Losch	15
3	Mihkel Räim (EST)	Cycling Academy	14
4	Daniel Turek (CZE)	Cycling Academy	10
5	Adrian Gjølberg (NOR)	Team FixIT.no	8
6	Tom Thill (LUX)	Differdange–Losch	7
7	Alessandro Bresciani (ITA)	Delio Gallina Colosio	6
8	Krisztián Lovassy (HUN)	Differdange–Losch	6
9	Oleksandr Polivoda (UKR)	Kolss BDC Team	5
10	Julian Hellmann (GER)	Embrace The World Cycling	5

=== Young riders classification ===
Young riders classification [under 23] (1–10)
Rank	Rider	Team	Time
1	Žiga Ručigaj (SLO)	Radenska–Ljubljana	16h 39' 35"
2	Filippo Tagliani (ITA)	Delio Gallina Colosio	+ 14"
3	Balázs Rózsa (HUN)	Szuper Beton	+ 57"
4	Josep Miralles (ESP)	Tuşnad Cycling Team	+ 1' 55"
5	Viktor Filutás (HUN)	Szuper Beton	+ 2' 08"
6	Filippo Fiorelli (ITA)	Delio Gallina Colosio	+ 2' 40"
7	Adhanom Zemicheal (ERI)	Start–Vaxes Cycling Team	+ 3' 25"
8	Bruno Maltar (CRO)	Radenska–Ljubljana	+ 4' 44"
9	Kristoffer Madsen (NOR)	Team FixIT.no	+ 5' 42"
10	Dániel Móricz (HUN)	Szuper Beton	+ 5' 50"

=== Team classification ===
Team classification (1–10)
Rank	Team	Time
1	Cycling Academy	49h 47' 48"
2	Kolss BDC Team	+ 5' 49"
3	Differdange–Losch	+ 7' 26"
4	Tuşnad Cycling Team	+ 9' 21"
5	Radenska–Ljubljana	+ 10' 29"
6	Delio Gallina Colosio	+ 13' 49"
7	Team FixIT.no	+ 15' 08"
8	Start–Vaxes Cycling Team	+ 18' 27"
9	West–Frisia	+ 18' 57"
10	Szuper Beton	+ 20' 01"

== Sponsorship ==
- Radio broadcasting organization, Rádió Rock 95.8FM, has sponsored the sárga trikó (General classification Winner).
- Hungarian Cycling Federation, Bringasport, has sponsored the zöld trikó (Point classification Winner).
- Active tourist portal, funiQ, has sponsored the piros trikó (Mountain classification Winner).
- The leader Hungarian bank, OTP Bank, has sponsored the fehér trikó (Young rider classification Winner).
- Ministry of Human Resources
- szelektalok.hu
- Bringaland
- Opel – official car of the Race
- Szerencsejáték Zrt.
- belotto – official jersey manufacturer
- Europcar
- Soudal
- Kunság-Szesz Zrt.
- Tissot – official timekeeper

== See also ==
- 2016 in men's road cycling
- 2016 in sports
