= 2017 Tour de Hongrie =

2017 UCI Europe Tour

Race details
- Dates: 27 June – 2 July
- Stages: 4 + Prologue (Note: Initially scheduled for a prologue and five road stages over 751 kilometres (467 miles), but one stage was cancelled due to extreme weather conditions.)
- Distance: 606 km (376.6 mi)
- Winning time: 13h 53' 43"

Results
Jersey awarded to the overall winner	Winner	Daniel Jaramillo (COL)	(UnitedHealthcare)
	Second	Barnabás Peák (HUN)	(Kontent–DKSI Cycling Team)
	Third	Tadej Pogačar (SLO)	(Rog–Ljubljana)
Jersey awarded to the points classification winner	Points	Scott Sunderland (AUS)	(IsoWhey Sports SwissWellness)
Jersey awarded to the mountains classification winner	Mountains	Amanuel Gebrezgabihier (ERI)	(Dimension Data for Qhubeka)
Jersey awarded to the youth classification winner	Youth	Barnabás Peák (HUN)	(Kontent–DKSI Cycling Team)
	Team	Dimension Data for Qhubeka	

The 2017 Tour de Hongrie was a six-day cycling stage race that took place in Hungary in June and July 2017. The race was the 38th edition of the Tour de Hongrie, and was rated as a 2.2 event as part of the 2017 UCI Europe Tour. The race included 5 stages plus the prologue, starting in Szombathely on 27 June and finishing on 2 July in Budapest.

The race was won by Colombia's Daniel Jaramillo (UnitedHealthcare), after winning the race's penultimate stage in Miskolc. Jaramillo finished two seconds clear of top young and Hungarian rider Barnabás Peák, riding for the Kontent–DKSI Cycling Team, while the podium was completed by Rog–Ljubljana's Tadej Pogačar from Slovenia. In the race's other classifications, Scott Sunderland (IsoWhey Sports SwissWellness) won the points classification after two stage victories, Dimension Data for Qhubeka's Amanuel Gebrezgabihier was the winner of the mountains classification, while his Dimension Data for Qhubeka squad won the teams classification.

== Schedule ==
The first stage was cancelled due to inclement weather.

Stage characteristics and winners
Stage	Date	Course	Distance	Type	Winner
P	27 June	Szombathely	1 km (0.6 mi)	Individual time trial	Scott Sunderland (AUS)
1	28 June	Keszthely to Zalaegerszeg	145 km (90.1 mi)	Hilly stage	Stage cancelled
2	29 June	Velence to Siófok	138 km (85.7 mi)	Hilly stage	Žiga Jerman (SLO)
3	30 June	Paks to Cegléd	178 km (110.6 mi)	Flat stage	Matti Manninen (FIN)
4	1 July	Karcag to Miskolc	177 km (110.0 mi)	Intermediate stage	Daniel Jaramillo (COL)
5	2 July	Jászberény to Budapest	112 km (69.6 mi)	Flat stage	Scott Sunderland (AUS)
Total			751 km (467 mi)		

== Participating teams ==
20 teams were invited to the 2017 Tour de Hongrie: one UCI Professional Continental team, eleven UCI Continental teams along with eight other teams, consisting of six domestic Hungarian teams, a regional team and a Serbian national team.

Unieuro Trevigiani–Hemus 1896 and the Astana Track Team withdrew from the race before it started, therefore eighteen teams took to the start in Szombathely.

UCI Professional Continental team

- UnitedHealthcare

UCI Continental teams

- Bike Aid
- Differdange–Losch
- Dimension Data for Qhubeka
- Dukla Banská Bystrica
- Team FixIT.no
- IsoWhey Sports SwissWellness
- Marlux–Napoleon Games
- Rog–Ljubljana
- SKC TUFO Prostějov
- Tusnad Cycling Team

National team

- Serbia

Regional and domestic teams

- Cube–Csömör
- Dr. Bátorfi–Agria KTK
- Epronex–Special Bikes Team
- Kőbánya Cycling Team
- Kontent–DKSI
- Tipográfia–DeGaVi

== Stages ==
=== Prologue ===
27 June 2017 — Szombathely (Main Square), 1 km (0.6 mi), individual time trial (ITT)

Prologue Result and General Classification after Prologue
Rank	Rider	Team	Time
1	Scott Sunderland (AUS)	IsoWhey Sports SwissWellness	1' 02"
2	Sándor Szalontay (HUN)	Bátorfi–Trek Team	+ 1"
3	Barnabás Peák (HUN)	Kontent–DKSI Cycling Team	+ 2"
4	Nicholas Dlamini (RSA)	Dimension Data for Qhubeka	+ 2"
5	Neil Van der Ploeg (AUS)	IsoWhey Sports SwissWellness	+ 3"
6	Daniel Jaramillo (COL)	UnitedHealthcare	+ 3"
7	Carlos Alzate (COL)	UnitedHealthcare	+ 3"
8	Krisztián Lovassy (HUN)	Differdange–Losch	+ 3"
9	Žiga Jerman (SLO)	Rog–Ljubljana	+ 4"
10	Tilen Finkšt (SLO)	Rog–Ljubljana	+ 4"

=== Stage 1 ===
28 June 2017 — Keszthely to Zalaegerszeg, 145 km (90 mi)

The stage was cancelled due to inclement weather.

Remained the General Classification after Stage 1
Rank	Rider	Team	Time
1	Scott Sunderland (AUS)	IsoWhey Sports SwissWellness	1' 02"
2	Sándor Szalontay (HUN)	Bátorfi–Trek Team	+ 1"
3	Barnabás Peák (HUN)	Kontent–DKSI Cycling Team	+ 2"
4	Nicholas Dlamini (RSA)	Dimension Data for Qhubeka	+ 2"
5	Neil Van der Ploeg (AUS)	IsoWhey Sports SwissWellness	+ 3"
6	Daniel Jaramillo (COL)	UnitedHealthcare	+ 3"
7	Carlos Alzate (COL)	UnitedHealthcare	+ 3"
8	Krisztián Lovassy (HUN)	Differdange–Losch	+ 3"
9	Žiga Jerman (SLO)	Rog–Ljubljana	+ 4"
10	Tilen Finkšt (SLO)	Rog–Ljubljana	+ 4"

=== Stage 2 ===
29 June 2017 — Velence to Siófok, 138 km (86 mi)

Result of Stage 2
Rank	Rider	Team	Time
1	Žiga Jerman (SLO)	Rog–Ljubljana	3h 22' 37"
2	Scott Sunderland (AUS)	IsoWhey Sports SwissWellness	+ 0"
3	Barnabás Peák (HUN)	Kontent–DKSI Cycling Team	+ 1"
4	Carlos Alzate (COL)	UnitedHealthcare	+ 1"
5	Angelo De Clercq (BEL)	Marlux–Napoleon Games	+ 1"
6	Cristian Raileanu (MDA)	Differdange–Losch	+ 1"
7	Amanuel Gebrezgabihier (ERI)	Dimension Data for Qhubeka	+ 1"
8	Patrik Tybor (SVK)	Dukla Banská Bystrica	+ 4"
9	Robbie Hucker (AUS)	IsoWhey Sports SwissWellness	+ 4"
10	Klaas Vantornout (BEL)	Marlux–Napoleon Games	+ 4"

General classification after Stage 2
Rank	Rider	Team	Time
1	Žiga Jerman (SLO)	Rog–Ljubljana	3h 23' 33"
2	Scott Sunderland (AUS)	IsoWhey Sports SwissWellness	+ 0"
3	Barnabás Peák (HUN)	Kontent–DKSI Cycling Team	+ 5"
4	Carlos Alzate (COL)	UnitedHealthcare	+ 10"
5	Nicholas Dlamini (RSA)	Dimension Data for Qhubeka	+ 12"
6	Amanuel Gebrezgabihier (ERI)	Dimension Data for Qhubeka	+ 12"
7	Cristian Raileanu (MDA)	Differdange–Losch	+ 13"
8	Angelo De Clercq (BEL)	Marlux–Napoleon Games	+ 13"
9	Daniel Jaramillo (COL)	UnitedHealthcare	+ 13"
10	Tilen Finkšt (SLO)	Rog–Ljubljana	+ 14"

=== Stage 3 ===
30 June 2017 — Paks to Cegléd, 178 km (111 mi)

Result of Stage 3
Rank	Rider	Team	Time
1	Matti Manninen (FIN)	Team FixIT.no	3h 46' 58"
2	Jelle Donders (BEL)	Differdange–Losch	+ 0"
3	Scott Sunderland (AUS)	IsoWhey Sports SwissWellness	+ 0"
4	Carlos Alzate (COL)	UnitedHealthcare	+ 0"
5	Meron Teshome (ERI)	Bike Aid	+ 0"
6	Daniel Jaramillo (COL)	UnitedHealthcare	+ 0"
7	Metkel Eyob (ERI)	Dimension Data for Qhubeka	+ 0"
8	Amanuel Gebrezgabihier (ERI)	Dimension Data for Qhubeka	+ 0"
9	Janier Acevedo (COL)	UnitedHealthcare	+ 0"
10	Dániel Móricz (HUN)	Kőbánya Cycling Team	+ 0"

General classification after Stage 3
Rank	Rider	Team	Time
1	Scott Sunderland (AUS)	IsoWhey Sports SwissWellness	7h 10' 27"
2	Žiga Jerman (SLO)	Rog–Ljubljana	+ 4"
3	Barnabás Peák (HUN)	Kontent–DKSI Cycling Team	+ 9"
4	Carlos Alzate (COL)	UnitedHealthcare	+ 14"
5	Nicholas Dlamini (RSA)	Dimension Data for Qhubeka	+ 16"
6	Amanuel Gebrezgabihier (ERI)	Dimension Data for Qhubeka	+ 16"
7	Cristian Raileanu (MDA)	Differdange–Losch	+ 17"
8	Angelo De Clercq (BEL)	Marlux–Napoleon Games	+ 17"
9	Daniel Jaramillo (COL)	UnitedHealthcare	+ 17"
10	Tilen Finkšt (SLO)	Rog–Ljubljana	+ 18"

=== Stage 4 ===
1 July 2017 — Karcag to Miskolc, 178 km (111 mi)

Result of Stage 4
Rank	Rider	Team	Time
1	Daniel Jaramillo (COL)	UnitedHealthcare	4h 09' 24"
2	Tadej Pogačar (SLO)	Rog–Ljubljana	+ 0"
3	Robbie Hucker (AUS)	IsoWhey Sports SwissWellness	+ 0"
4	Patrik Tybor (SVK)	Dukla Banská Bystrica	+ 0"
5	Thomas Joseph (BEL)	Marlux–Napoleon Games	+ 0"
6	Meron Teshome (ERI)	Bike Aid	+ 0"
7	Amanuel Gebrezgabihier (ERI)	Dimension Data for Qhubeka	+ 0"
8	Metkel Eyob (ERI)	Dimension Data for Qhubeka	+ 0"
9	Krisztián Lovassy (HUN)	Differdange–Losch	+ 0"
10	Lachlan Norris (AUS)	UnitedHealthcare	+ 0"

General classification after Stage 4
Rank	Rider	Team	Time
1	Daniel Jaramillo (COL)	UnitedHealthcare	11h 19' 58"
2	Barnabás Peák (HUN)	Kontent–DKSI Cycling Team	+ 2"
3	Tadej Pogačar (SLO)	Rog–Ljubljana	+ 7"
4	Robbie Hucker (AUS)	IsoWhey Sports SwissWellness	+ 8"
5	Nicholas Dlamini (RSA)	Dimension Data for Qhubeka	+ 9"
6	Amanuel Gebrezgabihier (ERI)	Dimension Data for Qhubeka	+ 9"
7	Cristian Raileanu (MDA)	Differdange–Losch	+ 10"
8	Thomas Joseph (BEL)	Marlux–Napoleon Games	+ 11"
9	Patrik Tybor (SVK)	Dukla Banská Bystrica	+ 12"
10	Klaas Vantornout (BEL)	Marlux–Napoleon Games	+ 12"

=== Stage 5 ===
2 July 2017 — Jászberény to Budapest, 112 km (70 mi)

Result of Stage 5
Rank	Rider	Team	Time
1	Scott Sunderland (AUS)	IsoWhey Sports SwissWellness	2h 33' 45"
2	Meron Teshome (ERI)	Bike Aid	+ 0"
3	Carlos Alzate (COL)	UnitedHealthcare	+ 0"
4	Robbie Hucker (AUS)	IsoWhey Sports SwissWellness	+ 0"
5	Krisztián Lovassy (HUN)	Differdange–Losch	+ 0"
6	Daniel Jaramillo (COL)	UnitedHealthcare	+ 0"
7	Dušan Kalaba (SRB)	Serbia (national team)	+ 0"
8	Amanuel Gebrezgabihier (ERI)	Dimension Data for Qhubeka	+ 0"
9	Tadej Pogačar (SLO)	Rog–Ljubljana	+ 0"
10	Nicholas Dlamini (RSA)	Dimension Data for Qhubeka	+ 0"

Final general classification
Rank	Rider	Team	Time
1	Daniel Jaramillo (COL)	UnitedHealthcare	13h 53' 43"
2	Barnabás Peák (HUN)	Kontent–DKSI Cycling Team	+ 2"
3	Tadej Pogačar (SLO)	Rog–Ljubljana	+ 7"
4	Robbie Hucker (AUS)	IsoWhey Sports SwissWellness	+ 8"
5	Nicholas Dlamini (RSA)	Dimension Data for Qhubeka	+ 9"
6	Amanuel Gebrezgabihier (ERI)	Dimension Data for Qhubeka	+ 9"
7	Cristian Raileanu (MDA)	Differdange–Losch	+ 10"
8	Patrik Tybor (SVK)	Dukla Banská Bystrica	+ 12"
9	Metkel Eyob (ERI)	Dimension Data for Qhubeka	+ 14"
10	Rubén Ramos (ARG)	Tusnad Cycling Team	+ 15"

== Classification leadership table ==
Classification leadership by stage
Stage	Winner	General classification	Points classification	Mountains classification	Young rider classification	Best Hungarian rider	Team classification
P	Scott Sunderland	Scott Sunderland	not awarded (Note: Sandor Szalontay received the jersey post-stage, but no points were on offer during the stage.)	not awarded (Note: Nicholas Dlamini received the jersey post-stage, but no points were on offer during the stage.)	Barnabás Peák	Sandor Szalontay	IsoWhey Sports SwissWellness
1	Stage cancelled	Scott Sunderland	not awarded	not awarded	Barnabás Peák	Sandor Szalontay	IsoWhey Sports SwissWellness
2	Žiga Jerman	Žiga Jerman	Žiga Jerman	Amanuel Gebrezgabihier	Žiga Jerman	Barnabás Peák	IsoWhey Sports SwissWellness
3	Matti Manninen	Scott Sunderland	Matti Manninen	Amanuel Gebrezgabihier	Žiga Jerman	Barnabás Peák	IsoWhey Sports SwissWellness
4	Daniel Jaramillo	Daniel Jaramillo	Matti Manninen	Amanuel Gebrezgabihier	Barnabás Peák	Barnabás Peák	Dimension Data for Qhubeka
5	Scott Sunderland	Daniel Jaramillo	Scott Sunderland	Amanuel Gebrezgabihier	Barnabás Peák	Barnabás Peák	Dimension Data for Qhubeka
Final		Daniel Jaramillo	Scott Sunderland	Amanuel Gebrezgabihier	Barnabás Peák	Barnabás Peák	Dimension Data for Qhubeka

== Final standings ==
Legend
Yellow jersey	Denotes the leader of the general classification	Green jersey	Denotes the leader of the points classification
Red jersey	Denotes the leader of the mountains classification	White jersey	Denotes the leader of the young rider classification
Celeste jersey	Denotes the leader of the best Hungarian rider classification		

=== General classification ===
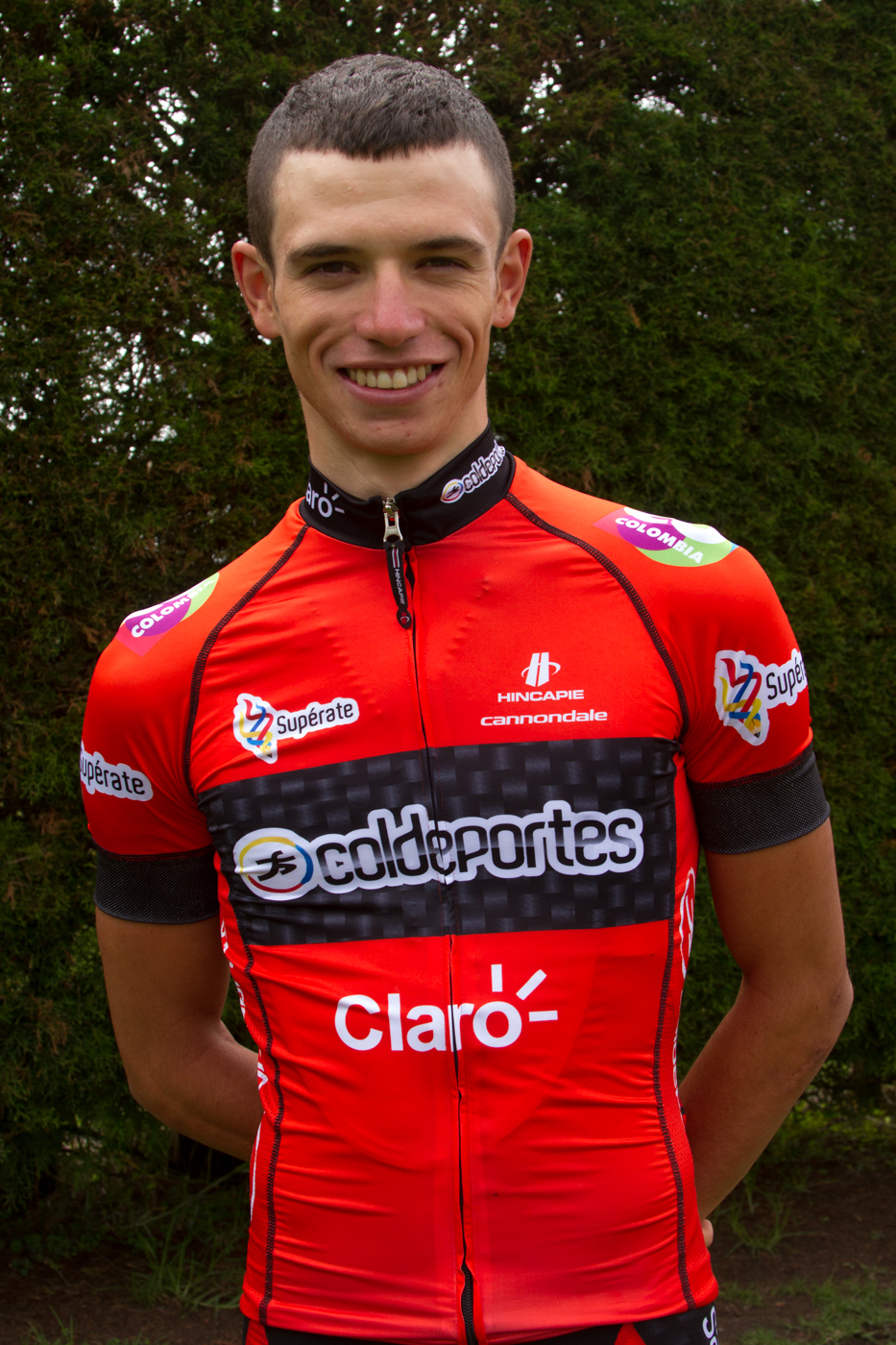
Daniel Jaramillo

General classification (1–10)
Rank	Rider	Team	Time
1	Daniel Jaramillo (COL)	UnitedHealthcare	13h 53' 43"
2	Barnabás Peák (HUN)	Kontent–DKSI Cycling Team	+ 2"
3	Tadej Pogačar (SLO)	Rog–Ljubljana	+ 7"
4	Robbie Hucker (AUS)	IsoWhey Sports SwissWellness	+ 8"
5	Nicholas Dlamini (RSA)	Dimension Data for Qhubeka	+ 9"
6	Amanuel Gebrezgabihier (ERI)	Dimension Data for Qhubeka	+ 9"
7	Cristian Raileanu (MDA)	Differdange–Losch	+ 10"
8	Patrik Tybor (SVK)	Dukla Banská Bystrica	+ 12"
9	Metkel Eyob (ERI)	Dimension Data for Qhubeka	+ 14"
10	Rubén Ramos (ARG)	Tusnad Cycling Team	+ 15"

=== Points classification ===
Points classification (1–10)
Rank	Rider	Team	Points
1	Scott Sunderland (AUS)	IsoWhey Sports SwissWellness	20
2	Matti Manninen (FIN)	Team FixIT.no	19
3	Jelle Donders (BEL)	Differdange–Losch	17
4	Daniel Jaramillo (COL)	UnitedHealthcare	12
5	Dušan Kalaba (SRB)	Serbia (national team)	12
6	Carlos Alzate (COL)	UnitedHealthcare	10
7	Žiga Jerman (SLO)	Rog–Ljubljana	10
8	Jozef Palčák (SVK)	Dukla Banská Bystrica	9
9	Meron Teshome (ERI)	Bike Aid	9
10	Robbie Hucker (AUS)	IsoWhey Sports SwissWellness	7

=== Mountains classification ===
Mountains classification (1–10)
Rank	Rider	Team	Points
1	Amanuel Gebrezgabihier (ERI)	Dimension Data for Qhubeka	17
2	Tadej Pogačar (SLO)	Rog–Ljubljana	15
3	Attila Valter (HUN)	Cube–Csömör	9
4	Patrik Tybor (SVK)	Dukla Banská Bystrica	7
5	Åsmund Løvik (NOR)	Team FixIT.no	6
6	Tom Thill (LUX)	Differdange–Losch	5
7	Maxim Rusnac (MDA)	Differdange–Losch	4
8	Jelle Donders (BEL)	Differdange–Losch	3
9	Marko Danilović (SRB)	Serbia (national team)	3
10	Tim Roe (AUS)	IsoWhey Sports SwissWellness	2

=== Young rider classification ===
Young rider classification (1–10)
Rank	Rider	Team	Time
1	Barnabás Peák (HUN)	Kontent–DKSI Cycling Team	13h 53' 45"
2	Tadej Pogačar (SLO)	Kontent–DKSI Cycling Team	+ 5"
3	Nicholas Dlamini (RSA)	Dimension Data for Qhubeka	+ 7"
4	Thomas Joseph (BEL)	Marlux–Napoleon Games	+ 15"
5	Izidor Penko (SLO)	Rog–Ljubljana	+ 24"
6	Matej Štibingr (CZE)	SKC TUFO Prostějov	+ 38"
7	Žiga Ručigaj (SLO)	Rog–Ljubljana	+ 2' 04"
8	Dániel Móricz (HUN)	Kőbánya Cycling Team	+ 2' 06"
9	Matic Grošelj (SLO)	Rog–Ljubljana	+ 2' 13"
10	Tijl Pauwels (BEL)	Marlux–Napoleon Games	+ 3' 05"

=== Hungarian rider classification ===
Best Hungarian rider classification (1–10)
Rank	Rider	Team	Time
1	Barnabás Peák	Kontent–DKSI Cycling Team	19h 22' 59"
2	Krisztián Lovassy	Differdange–Losch	+ 42"
3	Márton Dina	Cube–Csömör	+ 1' 15"
4	Dániel Móricz	Kőbánya Cycling Team	+ 2' 06"
5	Dávid Puskás	Kőbánya Cycling Team	+ 2' 15"
6	Gábor Fejes	Bátorfi–Trek	+ 3' 01"
7	Ferenc Szöllősi	Kontent–DKSI Cycling Team	+ 3' 06"
8	Zoltán Ruttkay	Bátorfi–Trek	+ 3' 06"
9	Csaba Pályi	Bátorfi–Trek	+ 3' 09"
10	Attila Valter	Cube–Csömör	+ 3' 13"

=== Teams classification ===
Team classification (1–10)
Rank	Team	Time
1	Dimension Data for Qhubeka	49h 45' 01"
2	Differdange–Losch	+ 1"
3	UnitedHealthcare	+ 3"
4	IsoWhey Sports SwissWellness	+ 5"
5	Bike Aid	+ 1' 56"
6	Rog–Ljubljana	+ 2' 02"
7	Marlux–Napoleon Games	+ 2' 11"
8	SKC TUFO Prostějov	+ 3' 31"
9	Bátorfi–Trek	+ 8' 43"
10	Dukla Banská Bystrica	+ 8' 43"

== See also ==
- 2017 in men's road cycling
- 2017 in sports
