= 2017 Tour of Norway =

2017 UCI Europe Tour
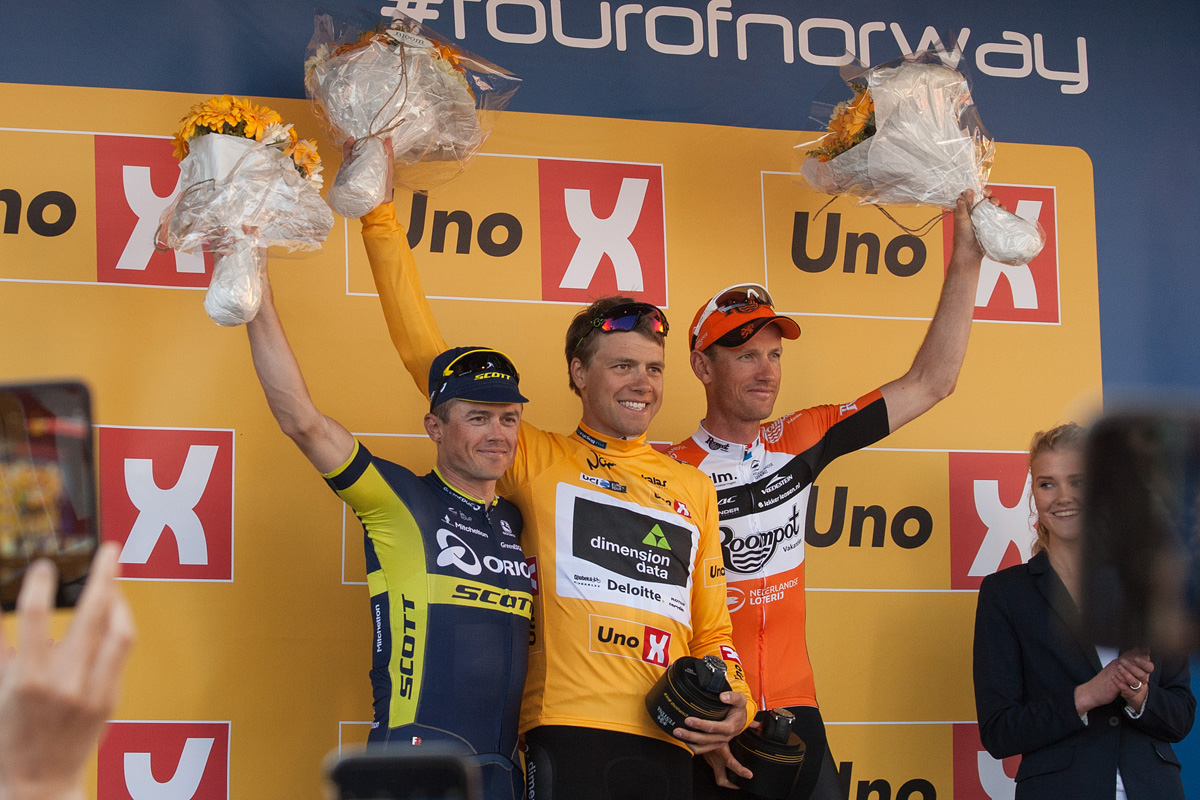
- The final podium (from L–R): Simon Gerrans, Edvald Boasson Hagen & Pieter Weening.

Race details
- Dates: 17–21 May 2017
- Stages: 5
- Distance: 904.5 km (562.0 mi)
- Winning time: 21h 39' 20"

Results
Jersey awarded to the overall winner	Winner	Edvald Boasson Hagen (NOR)	(Team Dimension Data)
	Second	Simon Gerrans (AUS)	(Orica–Scott)
	Third	Pieter Weening (NED)	(Roompot–Nederlandse Loterij)
Jersey awarded to the points classification winner	Points	Edvald Boasson Hagen (NOR)	(Team Dimension Data)
Jersey awarded to the mountains classification winner	Mountains	Preben Van Hecke (BEL)	(Sport Vlaanderen–Baloise)
Jersey awarded to the youth classification winner	Youth	Tobias Foss (NOR)	(Joker Icopal)
	Team	Lotto–Soudal	

The 2017 Tour of Norway was a road cycling stage race that took place in Norway between 17 and 21 May 2017. It was the seventh edition of the Tour of Norway and was rated as a 2.HC event as part of the 2017 UCI Europe Tour.

The race was won by Team Dimension Data's Edvald Boasson Hagen.

== Teams ==
Twenty-one teams were invited to start the race. These included five UCI WorldTeams, ten UCI Professional Continental teams and six UCI Continental teams.

UCI WorldTeams

- Cannondale–Drapac
- Team Dimension Data
- LottoNL–Jumbo
- Lotto–Soudal
- Orica–Scott

UCI Professional Continental teams

- Aqua Blue Sport
- Caja Rural–Seguros RGA
- CCC–Sprandi–Polkowice
- Gazprom–RusVelo
- Team Manzana Postobón
- Roompot–Nederlandse Loterij
- Sport Vlaanderen–Baloise
- Vérandas Willems–Crelan
- WB Veranclassic Aqua Protect
- Fortuneo–Vital Concept

UCI Continental teams

- Team Coop
- Team FixIT.no
- Joker Icopal
- Team Sparebanken Sør
- Uno-X Hydrogen Development Team
- Team VéloCONCEPT

== Schedule ==
Stage schedule
Stage	Date	Route	Distance	Type	Winner
1	17 May	Hønefoss to Asker	169.4 km (105.3 mi)	Medium-mountain stage	Edvald Boasson Hagen (NOR)
2	18 May	Eidsvoll to Brumunddal	194.2 km (120.7 mi)	Flat stage	Dylan Groenewegen (NED)
3	19 May	Hamar to Lillehammer	192.5 km (119.6 mi)	Medium-mountain stage	Pieter Weening (NED)
4	20 May	Lillestrøm to Sarpsborg	193.8 km (120.4 mi)	Flat stage	Dylan Groenewegen (NED)
5	21 May	Moss to Oslo	154.6 km (96.1 mi)	Medium-mountain stage	Edvald Boasson Hagen (NOR)

== Stages ==
=== Stage 1 ===
17 May 2017 — Hønefoss to Asker, 169.4 km (105.3 mi)

Stage 1 result
Rank	Rider	Team	Time
1	Edvald Boasson Hagen (NOR)	Team Dimension Data	4h 14' 01"
2	Tosh Van der Sande (BEL)	Lotto–Soudal	+ 0"
3	Simon Gerrans (AUS)	Orica–Scott	+ 0"
4	August Jensen (NOR)	Team Coop	+ 0"
5	Sander Armée (BEL)	Lotto–Soudal	+ 0"
6	Maxime Daniel (FRA)	Fortuneo–Vital Concept	+ 0"
7	Jeroen Meijers (NED)	Roompot–Nederlandse Loterij	+ 0"
8	Rasmus Guldhammer (DEN)	Team VéloCONCEPT	+ 0"
9	Tony Gallopin (FRA)	Lotto–Soudal	+ 0"
10	Nick Schultz (AUS)	Caja Rural–Seguros RGA	+ 0"

General classification after Stage 1
Rank	Rider	Team	Time
1	Edvald Boasson Hagen (NOR)	Team Dimension Data	4h 13' 51"
2	Tosh Van der Sande (BEL)	Lotto–Soudal	+ 4"
3	Simon Gerrans (AUS)	Orica–Scott	+ 6"
4	Carl Fredrik Hagen (NOR)	Joker Icopal	+ 9"
5	August Jensen (NOR)	Team Coop	+ 10"
6	Sander Armée (BEL)	Lotto–Soudal	+ 10"
7	Maxime Daniel (FRA)	Fortuneo–Vital Concept	+ 10"
8	Jeroen Meijers (NED)	Roompot–Nederlandse Loterij	+ 10"
9	Rasmus Guldhammer (DEN)	Team VéloCONCEPT	+ 10"
10	Tony Gallopin (FRA)	Lotto–Soudal	+ 10"

=== Stage 2 ===
18 May 2017 — Eidsvoll to Brumunddal, 194.2 km (120.7 mi)

Stage 2 result
Rank	Rider	Team	Time
1	Dylan Groenewegen (NED)	LottoNL–Jumbo	4h 49' 53"
2	Kristoffer Halvorsen (NOR)	Joker Icopal	+ 0"
3	Edvald Boasson Hagen (NOR)	Team Dimension Data	+ 0"
4	Tom Van Asbroeck (BEL)	Cannondale–Drapac	+ 0"
5	André Looij (NED)	Roompot–Nederlandse Loterij	+ 0"
6	Leigh Howard (AUS)	Aqua Blue Sport	+ 0"
7	Daniel McLay (GBR)	Fortuneo–Vital Concept	+ 0"
8	Alexander Porsev (RUS)	Gazprom–RusVelo	+ 0"
9	August Jensen (NOR)	Team Coop	+ 0"
10	Mitchell Docker (AUS)	Orica–Scott	+ 0"

General classification after Stage 2
Rank	Rider	Team	Time
1	Edvald Boasson Hagen (NOR)	Team Dimension Data	9h 03' 40"
2	Tosh Van der Sande (BEL)	Lotto–Soudal	+ 8"
3	Simon Gerrans (AUS)	Orica–Scott	+ 10"
4	Carl Fredrik Hagen (NOR)	Joker Icopal	+ 13"
5	August Jensen (NOR)	Team Coop	+ 14"
6	Rasmus Guldhammer (DEN)	Team VéloCONCEPT	+ 14"
7	Patrick Bevin (NZL)	Cannondale–Drapac	+ 14"
8	Aimé De Gendt (BEL)	Sport Vlaanderen–Baloise	+ 14"
9	Robert Power (AUS)	Orica–Scott	+ 14"
10	Nick Schultz (AUS)	Caja Rural–Seguros RGA	+ 14"

=== Stage 3 ===
19 May 2017 — Hamar to Lillehammer, 192.5 km (119.6 mi)

Stage 3 result
Rank	Rider	Team	Time
1	Pieter Weening (NED)	Roompot–Nederlandse Loterij	4h 37' 13"
2	Sander Armée (BEL)	Lotto–Soudal	+ 2"
3	Simon Gerrans (AUS)	Orica–Scott	+ 4"
4	Andreas Vangstad (NOR)	Team Sparebanken Sør	+ 7"
5	Alexander Kamp (DEN)	Team VéloCONCEPT	+ 7"
6	Nick Schultz (AUS)	Caja Rural–Seguros RGA	+ 7"
7	Tony Gallopin (FRA)	Lotto–Soudal	+ 7"
8	August Jensen (NOR)	Team Coop	+ 7"
9	Patrick Bevin (NZL)	Cannondale–Drapac	+ 7"
10	Larry Warbasse (USA)	Aqua Blue Sport	+ 7"

General classification after Stage 3
Rank	Rider	Team	Time
1	Pieter Weening (NED)	Roompot–Nederlandse Loterij	13h 40' 57"
2	Sander Armée (BEL)	Lotto–Soudal	+ 6"
3	Simon Gerrans (AUS)	Orica–Scott	+ 6"
4	Edvald Boasson Hagen (NOR)	Team Dimension Data	+ 12"
5	August Jensen (NOR)	Team Coop	+ 17"
6	Patrick Bevin (NZL)	Cannondale–Drapac	+ 17"
7	Nick Schultz (AUS)	Caja Rural–Seguros RGA	+ 17"
8	Larry Warbasse (USA)	Aqua Blue Sport	+ 17"
9	Tony Gallopin (FRA)	Lotto–Soudal	+ 17"
10	Andreas Vangstad (NOR)	Team Sparebanken Sør	+ 17"

=== Stage 4 ===
20 May 2017 — Lillestrøm to Sarpsborg, 193.8 km (120.4 mi)

Stage 4 result
Rank	Rider	Team	Time
1	Dylan Groenewegen (NED)	LottoNL–Jumbo	4h 26' 43"
2	Edvald Boasson Hagen (NOR)	Team Dimension Data	+ 0"
3	August Jensen (NOR)	Team Coop	+ 0"
4	Simon Gerrans (AUS)	Orica–Scott	+ 0"
5	Tosh Van der Sande (BEL)	Lotto–Soudal	+ 0"
6	Justin Jules (FRA)	WB Veranclassic Aqua Protect	+ 0"
7	Tom Van Asbroeck (BEL)	Cannondale–Drapac	+ 0"
8	Patrick Bevin (NZL)	Cannondale–Drapac	+ 3"
9	Eliot Lietaer (BEL)	Sport Vlaanderen–Baloise	+ 3"
10	Anders Skaarseth (NOR)	Joker Icopal	+ 3"

General classification after Stage 4
Rank	Rider	Team	Time
1	Pieter Weening (NED)	Roompot–Nederlandse Loterij	18h 07' 43"
2	Edvald Boasson Hagen (NOR)	Team Dimension Data	+ 3"
3	Simon Gerrans (AUS)	Orica–Scott	+ 3"
4	Sander Armée (BEL)	Lotto–Soudal	+ 6"
5	August Jensen (NOR)	Team Coop	+ 10"
6	Patrick Bevin (NZL)	Cannondale–Drapac	+ 17"
7	Nick Schultz (AUS)	Caja Rural–Seguros RGA	+ 17"
8	Larry Warbasse (USA)	Aqua Blue Sport	+ 17"
9	Andreas Vangstad (NOR)	Team Sparebanken Sør	+ 17"
10	Tony Gallopin (FRA)	Lotto–Soudal	+ 17"

=== Stage 5 ===
21 May 2017 — Moss to Oslo, 154.6 km (96.1 mi)

Stage 5 result
Rank	Rider	Team	Time
1	Edvald Boasson Hagen (NOR)	Team Dimension Data	3h 31' 44"
2	Simon Gerrans (AUS)	Orica–Scott	+ 0"
3	Tosh Van der Sande (BEL)	Lotto–Soudal	+ 0"
4	Patrick Bevin (NZL)	Cannondale–Drapac	+ 0"
5	August Jensen (NOR)	Team Coop	+ 0"
6	Anders Skaarseth (NOR)	Joker Icopal	+ 0"
7	Justin Jules (FRA)	WB Veranclassic Aqua Protect	+ 0"
8	Amund Grøndahl Jansen (NOR)	LottoNL–Jumbo	+ 0"
9	Armindo Fonseca (FRA)	Fortuneo–Vital Concept	+ 0"
10	Alexander Kamp (DEN)	Team VéloCONCEPT	+ 0"

Final general classification
Rank	Rider	Team	Time
1	Edvald Boasson Hagen (NOR)	Team Dimension Data	21h 39' 20"
2	Simon Gerrans (AUS)	Orica–Scott	+ 4"
3	Pieter Weening (NED)	Roompot–Nederlandse Loterij	+ 10"
4	Sander Armée (BEL)	Lotto–Soudal	+ 16"
5	August Jensen (NOR)	Team Coop	+ 17"
6	Patrick Bevin (NZL)	Cannondale–Drapac	+ 24"
7	Nick Schultz (AUS)	Caja Rural–Seguros RGA	+ 27"
8	Larry Warbasse (USA)	Aqua Blue Sport	+ 27"
9	Andreas Vangstad (NOR)	Team Sparebanken Sør	+ 27"
10	Tony Gallopin (FRA)	Lotto–Soudal	+ 27"

== Classification leadership table ==
In the 2017 Tour of Norway, four different jerseys were awarded. The general classification was calculated by adding each cyclist's finishing times on each stage, and allowing time bonuses for the first three finishers at intermediate sprints (three seconds to first, two seconds to second and one second to third) and at the finish of mass-start stages; these were awarded to the first three finishers on all stages: the stage winner won a ten-second bonus, with six and four seconds for the second and third riders respectively. The leader of the classification received a yellow jersey; it was considered the most important of the 2017 Tour of Norway, and the winner of the classification was considered the winner of the race.

Points for the mountains classification
Position	1	2	3	4	5	6
Points for Category 1	10	9	8	7	6	5
Points for Category 2	6	5	4	3	2	1
Points for Category 3	4	3	2	1	0	

Additionally, there was a points classification, which awarded a green jersey. In the points classification, cyclists received points for finishing in the top 15 in a stage. For winning a stage, a rider earned 15 points, with 14 for second, 13 for third, and a point fewer per place down to 1 point for 15th place. Points towards the classification could also be accrued – awarded on a 3–2–1 scale – at intermediate sprint points during each stage; these intermediate sprints also offered bonus seconds towards the general classification as noted above.

There was also a mountains classification, the leadership of which was marked by an orange jersey. In the mountains classification, points towards the classification were won by reaching the top of a climb before other cyclists. Each climb was categorised as either first, second, or third-category, with more points available for the higher-categorised climbs. The fourth and final jersey represented the classification for young riders, marked by a white jersey. This was decided the same way as the general classification, but only riders born after 1 January 1995 were eligible to be ranked in the classification. There was also a classification for teams, in which the times of the best three cyclists per team on each stage were added together; the leading team at the end of the race was the team with the lowest total time.

Classification leadership by stage
Stage	Winner	General classification	Points classification	Mountains classification	Young rider classification	Team classification
1	Edvald Boasson Hagen	Edvald Boasson Hagen	Edvald Boasson Hagen	Juan Pablo Villegas	Robert Power	Lotto–Soudal
2	Dylan Groenewegen	Edvald Boasson Hagen	Edvald Boasson Hagen	Preben Van Hecke	Robert Power	Lotto–Soudal
3	Pieter Weening	Pieter Weening	Edvald Boasson Hagen	Preben Van Hecke	Robert Power	Lotto–Soudal
4	Dylan Groenewegen	Pieter Weening	Edvald Boasson Hagen	Preben Van Hecke	Tobias Foss	Lotto–Soudal
5	Edvald Boasson Hagen	Edvald Boasson Hagen	Edvald Boasson Hagen	Preben Van Hecke	Tobias Foss	Lotto–Soudal
Final		Edvald Boasson Hagen	Edvald Boasson Hagen	Preben Van Hecke	Tobias Foss	Lotto–Soudal

== Final standings ==
Legend
Yellow jersey	Denotes the leader of the General classification
Green jersey	Denotes the leader of the Points classification
Orange jersey	Denotes the leader of the Mountains classification
White jersey	Denotes the leader of the Young rider classification

=== General classification ===
Final general classification
Rank	Rider	Team	Time
1	Edvald Boasson Hagen (NOR)	Team Dimension Data	21h 39' 20"
2	Simon Gerrans (AUS)	Orica–Scott	+ 4"
3	Pieter Weening (NED)	Roompot–Nederlandse Loterij	+ 10"
4	Sander Armée (BEL)	Lotto–Soudal	+ 16"
5	August Jensen (NOR)	Team Coop	+ 17"
6	Patrick Bevin (NZL)	Cannondale–Drapac	+ 24"
7	Nick Schultz (AUS)	Caja Rural–Seguros RGA	+ 27"
8	Larry Warbasse (USA)	Aqua Blue Sport	+ 27"
9	Andreas Vangstad (NOR)	Team Sparebanken Sør	+ 27"
10	Tony Gallopin (FRA)	Lotto–Soudal	+ 27"

=== Points classification ===
Final points classification
Rank	Rider	Team	Points
1	Edvald Boasson Hagen (NOR)	Team Dimension Data	59
2	Simon Gerrans (AUS)	Orica–Scott	52
3	August Jensen (NOR)	Team Coop	51
4	Tosh Van der Sande (BEL)	Lotto–Soudal	43
5	Dylan Groenewegen (NED)	LottoNL–Jumbo	30
6	Patrick Bevin (NZL)	Cannondale–Drapac	27
7	Sander Armée (BEL)	Lotto–Soudal	25
8	Justin Jules (FRA)	WB Veranclassic Aqua Protect	23
9	Tom Van Asbroeck (BEL)	Cannondale–Drapac	21
10	Pieter Weening (NED)	Roompot–Nederlandse Loterij	19

=== Mountains classification ===
Final mountains classification
Rank	Rider	Team	Points
1	Preben Van Hecke (BEL)	Sport Vlaanderen–Baloise	19
2	Robert Power (AUS)	Orica–Scott	11
3	Sander Armée (BEL)	Lotto–Soudal	10
4	Ken-Levi Eikeland (NOR)	Team FixIT.no	9
5	Marius Blålid (NOR)	Team FixIT.no	9
6	Juan Pablo Villegas (COL)	Team Manzana Postobón	8
7	Edvald Boasson Hagen (NOR)	Team Dimension Data	8
8	Pieter Weening (NED)	Roompot–Nederlandse Loterij	8
9	Louis Vervaeke (BEL)	Lotto–Soudal	6
10	Fernando Orjuela (COL)	Team Manzana Postobón	6

=== Young rider classification ===
Final young rider classification
Rank	Rider	Team	Time
1	Tobias Foss (NOR)	Joker Icopal	21h 40' 09"
2	Robert Power (AUS)	Orica–Scott	+ 22"
3	Wilmar Paredes (COL)	Team Manzana Postobón	+ 29"
4	James Shaw (GBR)	Lotto–Soudal	+ 1' 15"
5	Piotr Brożyna (POL)	CCC–Sprandi–Polkowice	+ 3' 56"
6	Alex Aranburu (ESP)	Caja Rural–Seguros RGA	+ 8' 54"
7	Anders Skaarseth (NOR)	Joker Icopal	+ 9' 38"
8	Artem Nych (RUS)	Gazprom–RusVelo	+ 11' 12"
9	Torstein Træen (NOR)	Uno-X Hydrogen Development Team	+ 13' 10"
10	Nicolaj Steen (DEN)	Team VéloCONCEPT	+ 16' 24"

=== Teams classification ===
Final teams classification
Rank	Team	Time
1	Lotto–Soudal	64h 59' 31"
2	Joker Icopal	+ 23"
3	Fortuneo–Vital Concept	+ 2' 39"
4	Orica–Scott	+ 4' 26"
5	Roompot–Nederlandse Loterij	+ 7' 07"
6	Aqua Blue Sport	+ 9' 31"
7	Team Manzana Postobón	+ 11' 36"
8	Team VéloCONCEPT	+ 11' 52"
9	Caja Rural–Seguros RGA	+ 12' 42"
10	WB Veranclassic Aqua Protect	+ 13' 04"
