= 2017 UCI Road World Championships – Men's team time trial =

Men's team time trial
2017 UCI Road World Championships

Race details
- Dates: 17 September 2017
- Stages: 1
- Distance: 42.5 km (26.41 mi)
- Winning time: 47' 50.42"

Medalists
	Gold	Team Sunweb
	Silver	BMC Racing Team
	Bronze	Team Sky

The Men's team time trial of the 2017 UCI Road World Championships was a cycling event that took place on 17 September 2017 in Bergen, Norway. It was the 33rd edition of the championship, and the 6th since its reintroduction for trade teams in 2012. Belgian team Quick-Step Floors were the defending champions, having won in 2016. 17 teams and 102 riders entered the competition.

After the women's Sunweb team won their team time trial earlier in the day, the men repeated the feat, with the German-registered outfit finishing 8.29 seconds clear of the BMC Racing Team from the United States. The podium was completed by Team Sky of Great Britain, 22.35 seconds behind the time Team Sunweb. Defending champions Quick-Step Floors finished fourth, 35.20 seconds down on the winners, and missed the medals for the first time since the race was reintroduced.

== Course ==
The race started in Askøy Municipality and finished in the centre of Bergen. It was 42.5 kilometres (26.4 miles)-long and featured two climbs: Loddefjord, a 600-metre (2,000 ft)-long climb at an average gradient of 10% and the Birkelundsbakken, a climb 3 kilometres (1.9 miles) in length, at an average of 6%.

== Prevention of UCI WorldTeams boycott ==
Just as in 2016, the event had been due to award points towards the team rankings of the 2017 UCI World Tour. In August 2017, the Association International des Groupes Cyclistes Professionels (AIGCP) agreed a deal with the UCI to avoid a boycott of the race, but no points would be awarded towards the World Tour rankings.

== Final classification ==
All seventeen teams completed the 42.5-kilometre (26.4 mi)-long course.

Rank	Team	Riders	Time
1	(Germany) Team Sunweb	Tom Dumoulin (NED); Lennard Kämna (GER); Wilco Kelderman (NED); Søren Kragh Andersen (DEN); Michael Matthews (AUS); Sam Oomen (NED)	47' 50.42"
2	(United States) BMC Racing Team	Rohan Dennis (AUS); Silvan Dillier (SUI); Stefan Küng (SUI); Daniel Oss (ITA); Miles Scotson (AUS); Tejay van Garderen (USA)	+ 8.29"
3	(United Kingdom) Team Sky	Owain Doull (GBR); Chris Froome (GBR); Vasil Kiryienka (BLR); Michał Kwiatkowski (POL); Gianni Moscon (ITA); Geraint Thomas (GBR)	+ 22.35"
4	(Belgium) Quick-Step Floors	Jack Bauer (NZL); Philippe Gilbert (BEL); Bob Jungels (LUX); Yves Lampaert (BEL); Niki Terpstra (NED); Julien Vermote (BEL)	+ 35.20"
5	(Australia) Orica–Scott	Luke Durbridge (AUS); Alex Edmondson (AUS); Michael Hepburn (AUS); Damien Howson (AUS); Daryl Impey (RSA); Svein Tuft (CAN)	+ 1' 03.21"
6	(Spain) Movistar Team	Andrey Amador (CRC); Jonathan Castroviejo (ESP); Alex Dowsett (GBR); Imanol Erviti (ESP); Gorka Izagirre (ESP); Jasha Sütterlin (GER)	+ 1' 19.23"
7	(Netherlands) LottoNL–Jumbo	Lars Boom (NED); Victor Campenaerts (BEL); Stef Clement (NED); Primož Roglič (SLO); Jos van Emden (NED); Gijs Van Hoecke (BEL)	+ 1' 19.58"
8	(Poland) CCC–Sprandi–Polkowice	Marcin Białobłocki (POL); Jonas Koch (GER); Łukasz Owsian (POL); Maciej Paterski (POL); Mateusz Taciak (POL); Jan Tratnik (SLO)	+ 1' 44.05"
9	(Switzerland) Team Katusha–Alpecin	Reto Hollenstein (SUI); Alexander Kristoff (NOR); Tiago Machado (POR); Tony Martin (GER); Michael Mørkøv (DEN); Nils Politt (GER)	+ 1' 45.58"
10	(Germany) Bora–Hansgrohe	Jan Bárta (CZE); Maciej Bodnar (POL); Marcus Burghardt (GER); Patrick Konrad (AUT); Lukas Pöstlberger (AUT); Aleksejs Saramotins (LAT)	+ 1' 55.10"
11	(Kazakhstan) Astana	Dario Cataldo (ITA); Sergey Chernetskiy (RUS); Oscar Gatto (ITA); Andriy Hrivko (UKR); Truls Korsæth (NOR); Alexey Lutsenko (KAZ)	+ 2' 15.79"
12	(United States) Trek–Segafredo	Matthias Brändle (AUT); Marco Coledan (ITA); Koen de Kort (NED); Markel Irizar (ESP); Jarlinson Pantano (COL); Edward Theuns (BEL)	+ 2' 49.61"
13	(Norway) Joker Icopal	Ole Forfang (NOR); Carl Fredrik Hagen (NOR); Kristoffer Halvorsen (NOR); Markus Hoelgaard (NOR); Bjørn Tore Hoem (NOR); Kristoffer Skjerping (NOR)	+ 3' 08.09"
14	(Italy) Sangemini–MG.K Vis	Simone Bernardini (ITA); Nicola Gaffurini (ITA); Michele Gazzara (ITA); Niccolò Salvietti (ITA); Michele Scartezzini (ITA); Paolo Totò (ITA)	+ 5' 02.06"
15	(Norway) Uno-X Hydrogen Development Team	Audun Fløtten (NOR); Erik Resell (NOR); Hans Kristian Rudland (NOR); Torjus Sleen (NOR); Torstein Træen (NOR); Syver Wærsted (NOR)	+ 5' 09.74"
16	(Norway) Team FixIT.no	Marius Blålid (NOR); Ken-Levi Eikeland (NOR); Åsmund Løvik (NOR); Kristoffer Madsen (NOR); Bjørnar Øverland (NOR); Elias Angell Spikseth (NOR)	+ 5' 21.45"
17	(Norway) Team Sparebanken Sør	Kristian Aasvold (NOR); Herman Dahl (NOR); Fridtjof Røinås (NOR); Mathias Skjold (NOR); Trond Trondsen (NOR); Andreas Vangstad (NOR)	+ 5' 30.47"
