= Adrian Gjølberg =

Norwegian cyclist

Personal information
- Born: 23 February 1989 (age 37) Tønsberg, Norway

Cycling career
- Sport: Cycling
- Current team: Team FixIT.no
- Discipline: Road
- Role: Rider

Professional teams
- 2010: Plussbank Cervélo
- 2011–2013: Team Joker Merida
- 2014–: Team FixIT.no

Adrian Gjølberg (born 23 February 1989 in Tønsberg) is a former Norwegian cyclist and current Directeur Sportif with Team FixIT.no.

== Major results ==
2008
3rd Road race, National Under-23 Road Championships
2011
1st Stage 1 Tour of China
2013
1st Stage 3 (TTT) Circuit des Ardennes
