= Hans Kristian Rudland =

Norwegian cyclist

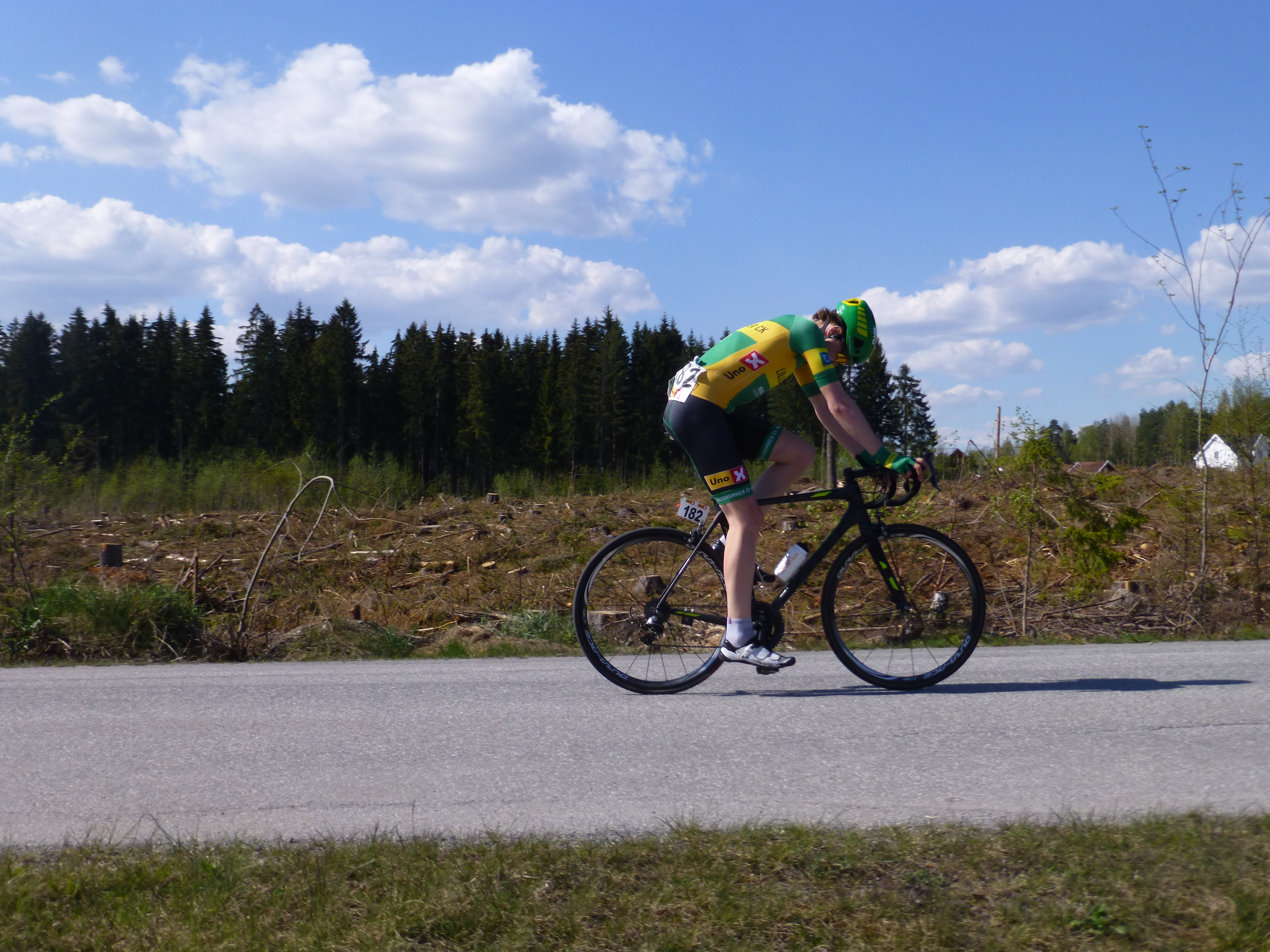

Personal information
- Born: 16 April 1997 (age 29)

Cycling career
- Sport: Cycling
- Current team: Uno-X Mobility
- Discipline: Road
- Role: Rider

Professional team
- 2017–: Uno-X Hydrogen Development Team

Hans Kristian Rudland (born 16 April 1997) is a Norwegian racing cyclist. He competed in the men's team time trial event at the 2017 UCI Road World Championships.

== Major results ==
2017
5th Overall Olympia's Tour
