= Rok Korošec =

Slovenian cyclist

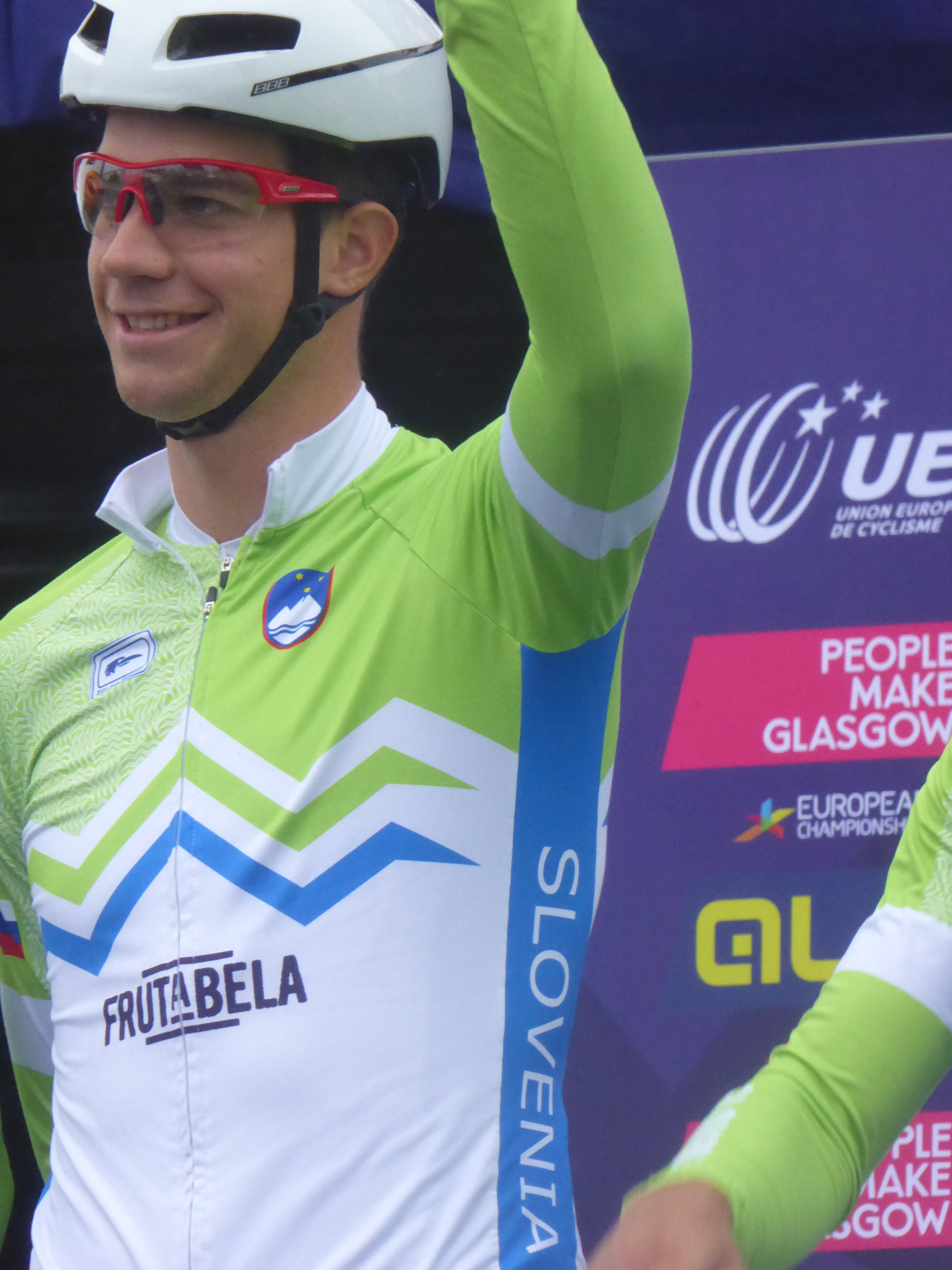
- Korošec at the 2018 European Road Cycling Championships

Personal information
- Full name: Rok Korošec
- Born: 24 November 1993 (age 32) Kamnik, Slovenia

Cycling career
- Sport: Cycling
- Current team: Retired
- Discipline: Road
- Role: Rider

Professional teams
- 2014–2016: Radenska
- 2017–2018: Amplatz–BMC
- 2019–2020: Ljubljana Gusto Santic

Rok Korošec (born 24 November 1993) is a Slovenian former cyclist, who competed between 2014 and 2020 for UCI Continental teams Radenska–Ljubljana, My Bike–Stevens and Ljubljana Gusto Santic.

== Major results ==
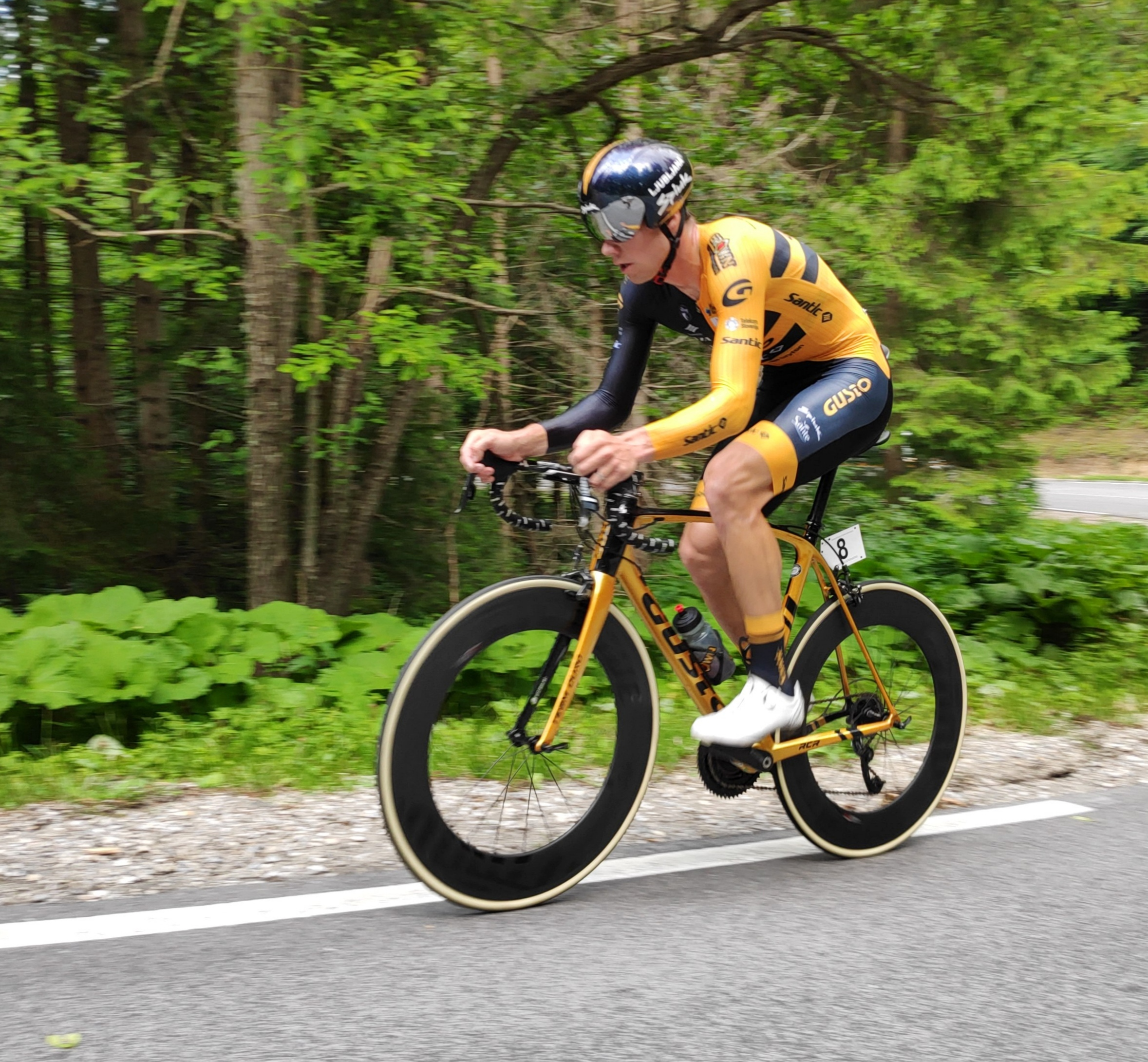
Korošec at the 2020 Slovenian National Time Trial Championships

2014
9th GP Slovakia, Visegrad 4 Bicycle Race
2015
3rd Time trial, National Under-23 Road Championships
9th Poreč Trophy
2016
1st Grand Prix Cycliste de Gemenc
1st Mountains classification, Tour of Bihor
5th Overall Tour de Hongrie

1st Stage 5

7th GP Adria Mobil
9th Trofej Umag
10th Trofeo Edil C
2017
1st Trofej Umag
Visegrad 4 Bicycle Race

1st GP Czech Republic
2nd GP Poland

3rd Overall Okolo Jižních Čech
4th Croatia–Slovenia
2018
1st Overall Gemenc Grand Prix

1st Stage 1

Visegrad 4 Bicycle Race

3rd GP Czech Republic
3rd GP Slovakia
3rd Kerekparverseny

4th Road race, Mediterranean Games
5th Overall Belgrade Banjaluka

1st Mountains classification

7th GP Izola
9th Croatia–Slovenia
2019
2nd Croatia–Slovenia
V4 Special Series

3rd Vasarosnameny–Nyiregyhaza
9th Debrecen–Ibrany

6th Poreč Trophy
6th Trofeo Città di Brescia
6th GP Kranj
10th Trofej Umag
10th GP Slovenian Istria
2020
8th Overall Course de Solidarność et des Champions Olympiques

1st Mountains classification
