= Chris Butler (cyclist) =

American cyclist

Personal information
- Full name: Christopher Butler
- Born: February 16, 1988 (age 38) Hilton Head Island, South Carolina
- Height: 1.80 m (5 ft 11 in)
- Weight: 61 kg (134 lb)

Cycling career
- Sport: Cycling
- Current team: Retired
- Discipline: Road
- Role: Rider
- Rider type: Climber

Professional teams
- 2010–2011: BMC Racing Team
- 2012–2013: Champion System
- 2014: Hincapie Sportswear Development Team
- 2015–2016: Team SmartStop
- 2016: Cycling Academy
- 2017: Caja Rural–Seguros RGA

Christopher Butler (born February 16, 1988, in Hilton Head Island, South Carolina) is an American former professional cyclist, who rode professionally between 2010 and 2017 for six different teams. After retiring from cycling, Butler became a Self Storage Investor in South Carolina.

== Major results ==
2012
5th Overall Tour of Japan
7th Overall Tour of Hainan
2013
10th Overall Tour de Beauce
2015
3rd Overall Vuelta a la Independencia Nacional
2016
1st Overall Tour of Arad

1st Stage 3

1st Mount Evans Hill Climb
Tour de Hongrie

1st Mountains classification
1st Stage 4

8th Overall Flèche du Sud
2017
8th Overall Tour of Utah

=== Grand Tour general classification results timeline ===
| Grand Tour | 2011 |
|---|---|
| Giro d'Italia | DNF |
| Tour de France | — |
| Vuelta a España | — |

Legend
| — | Did not compete |
| DNF | Did not finish |
