= Hets Hatsafon =

Israeli cycling race

Race details
- Date: June
- Region: Israel
- Discipline: Road
- Competition: UCI Europe Tour
- Type: One-day race

History
- First edition: 2011
- Editions: 7 (as of 2017)
- First winner: Ilan Kolton (ISR)
- Most wins: Guy Gabay (ISR)
- Most recent: Dor Dviri (ISR)

Northern Arrow (Hets Hatsafon) is a one-day road cycling race held annually since 2011. It is located in Israel with both starting and finishing in Bar'am. It became part of UCI Europe Tour under category 1.2 in 2016.

== Winners ==
Year	Country	Rider	Team
2011	Israel	Ilan Kolton	
2012	Israel	Ayal Rahat	
2013	Israel	Guy Gabay	
2014	Ukraine	Dmytro Grabovskyy	
2015	Israel	Guy Sagiv	
2016	Israel	Guy Gabay	Cycling Academy Team
2017	Israel	Dor Dviri	
