= Daniel Jaramillo =

Colombian bicycle racer

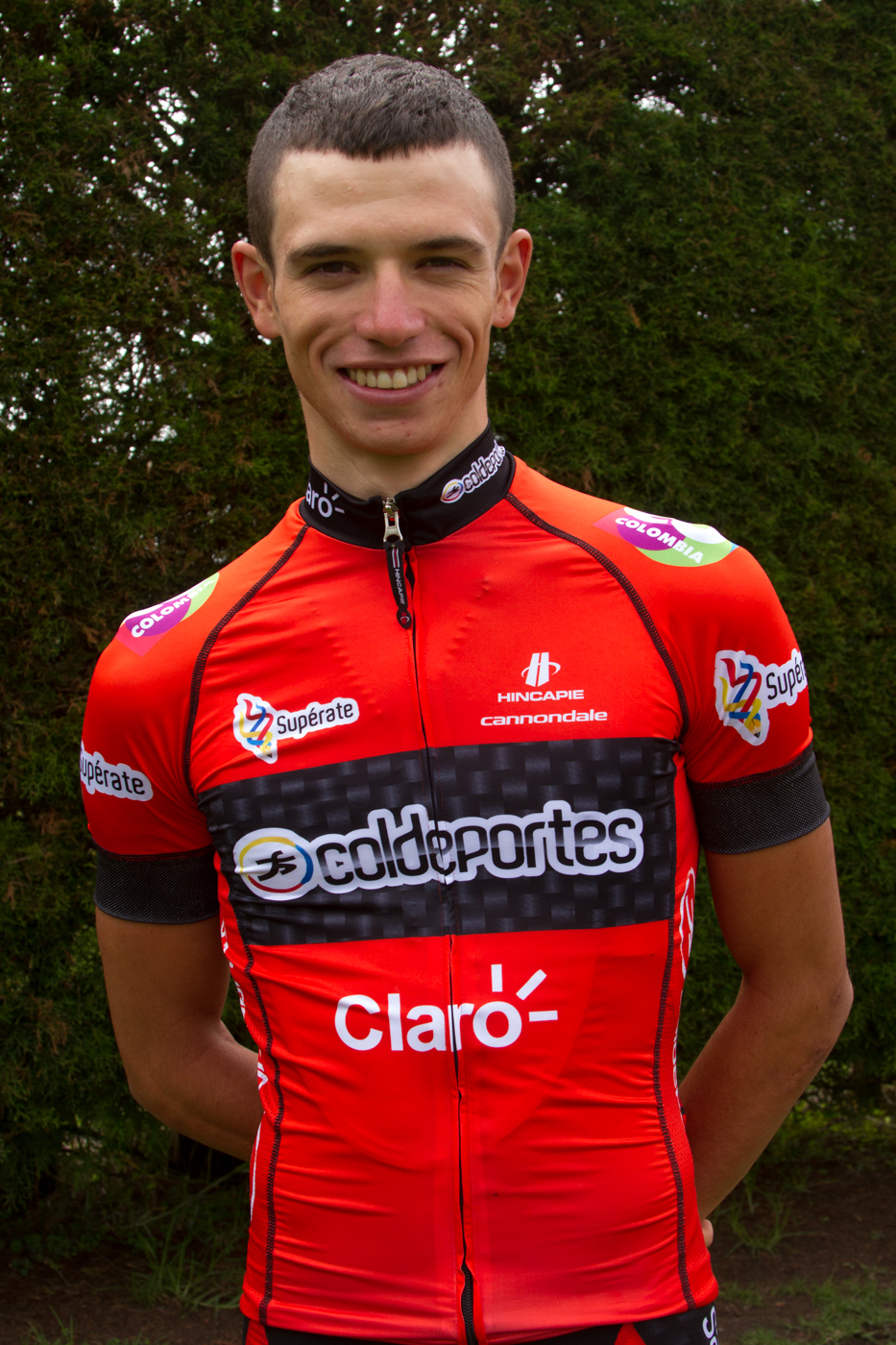
- Jaramillo in 2013.

Personal information
- Full name: Daniel Alexander Jaramillo Diez
- Born: 15 January 1991 (age 35) Jardín, Colombia
- Height: 1.75 m (5 ft 9 in)
- Weight: 63 kg (139 lb)

Cycling career
- Sport: Cycling
- Discipline: Road
- Role: Rider
- Rider type: Climber

Amateur teams
- 2011–2012: Gobernación de Antioquia–Indeportes Antioquia
- 2021–2022: Equipe Continental Orgullo Paisa

Professional teams
- 2013: Colombia–Coldeportes
- 2014–2015: Jamis–Hagens Berman
- 2016–2018: UnitedHealthcare
- 2019: Team Manzana Postobón

Daniel Alexander Jaramillo Diez (born 15 January 1991) is a Colombian racing cyclist, who last rode for Colombian amateur team Equipe Continental Orgullo Paisa.

== Major results ==
2010
7th Overall Vuelta a Guatemala
2011
Pan American Road Championships

2nd Under-23 time trial
6th Time trial

2012
3rd Overall Vuelta a Mexico

1st Young rider classification

2013
3rd Road race, National Under-23 Road Championships
2014
5th Overall Tour of the Gila

1st Mountains classification
1st Young rider classification
1st Stages 1 & 5

5th Philadelphia International Cycling Classic
9th Bucks County Classic
2015
2nd Road race, National Road Championships
2nd Overall Tour of the Gila

1st Young rider classification

5th Philadelphia International Championship
8th Overall Tour de San Luis
2016
1st Stage 5 Tour of Japan
2nd Overall Tour de Langkawi
5th Overall Tour of the Gila

1st Mountains classification
1st Stage 5

2017
1st Overall Tour de Hongrie

1st Stage 4

1st Mountains classification Tour of California
4th Overall Tour de Langkawi
2018
5th Overall Joe Martin Stage Race
