= Nicholas Dlamini =

South African cyclist (born 1995)

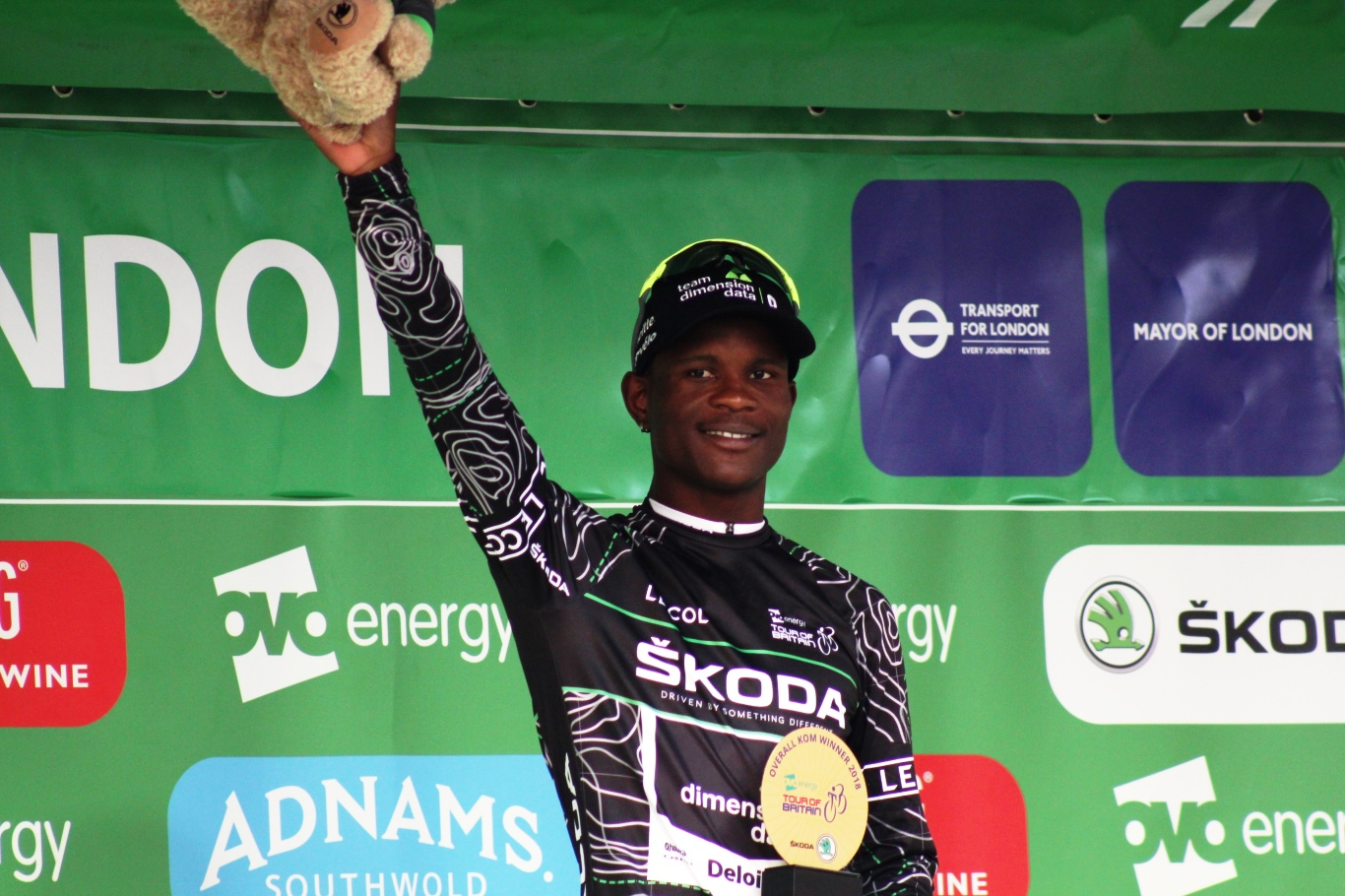
- Dlamini at the 2018 Tour of Britain, where he won the mountains classification

Personal information
- Born: 12 August 1995 (age 31) Cape Town, South Africa
- Height: 1.77 m (5 ft 10 in)
- Weight: 66 kg (146 lb)

Cycling career
- Sport: Cycling
- Discipline: Road
- Role: Rider

Amateur teams
- 2016–2017: Dimension Data for Qhubeka
- 2017: Team Dimension Data (stagiaire)

Professional teams
- 2018–2021: Team Dimension Data
- 2022: Team Qhubeka

Nicholas Dlamini (born 12 August 1995) is a South African cyclist, who most recently rode for UCI Continental team Q36.5 Continental Team.

== Career ==
Growing up in Capricorn Park, Cape Town, Dlamini's first sport was running, which he took up in 2009 along with his twin sister Nikita. In 2011 he took up cycling, initially alongside his running career. He pursued his development at the World Cycling Centre. Dlamini turned professional in 2018: at that year's Tour Down Under, the first UCI World Tour race of his career, he won the King of the Mountains jersey, becoming the first black South African to win a major classification in a World Tour race. In August 2019, he was named in the startlist for the 2019 Vuelta a España.

On 27 December 2019, Dlamini was assaulted by rangers at the Table Mountain National Park where he was training and suffered a broken arm during an altercation.

He was selected to represent South Africa at the 2020 Summer Olympics. He rode in the 2021 Tour de France, becoming the first black South African cyclist to ride the Tour, but was eliminated after finishing outside the time limit on the ninth stage.

== Personal life ==
He is an ambassador for the Elton John AIDS Foundation.

== Major results ==
2013
African Junior Road Championships

1st Team time trial
10th Road race

2014
1st Cape Rouleur
2015
KZN Autumn Series

1st Mayday Classic
3rd PMB Road Classic

African Road Championships

2nd Team time trial
7th Under-23 road race

2nd Time trial, National Under-23 Road Championships
2016
9th Piccolo Giro di Lombardia
2017
1st Mountains classification, Giro Ciclistico d'Italia
2nd Time trial, National Under-23 Road Championships
5th Overall Tour de Hongrie
6th Gran Premio Industrie del Marmo
2018
1st Mountains classification, Tour Down Under
1st Mountains classification, Tour of Britain
2019
5th Road race, National Road Championships
2021
3rd Road race, National Road Championships

=== Grand Tour general classification results timeline ===
Grand Tour	2019	2020	2021
Giro d'Italia	—	—	—
Tour de France	—	—	DNF
Vuelta a España	107	DNF	—

Legend
—	Did not compete
DNF	Did not finish
