= Bjørnar Øverland =

Norwegian cyclist

Personal information
- Full name: Bjørnar Vevatne Øverland
- Born: 19 August 1995 (age 31)

Cycling career
- Sport: Cycling
- Discipline: Road
- Role: Rider

Amateur teams
- 2014–2015: Bergen CK
- 2019: Bergen CK

Professional teams
- 2016–2017: Team FixIT.no
- 2018: Kőbánya Cycling Team

Bjørnar Øverland (born 19 August 1995) is a Norwegian racing cyclist. He competed in the men's team time trial event at the 2017 UCI Road World Championships.

== Major results ==
2017
National Road Championships

3rd Road race
6th Time trial
