= 2012 Vuelta a Mexico =

The 2012 Vuelta a Mexico was the 4th edition of the Vuelta Mexico Telmex. It started on 18 March in Acapulco with a 100 kilometres circuit. It lasted 8 days with a total length being 897.2 kilometers including a 12 km Individual Time Trial.

The general classification's blue jersey was won by Óscar Sevilla of Empacadora San Marcos for the second time. The Mountains Classification was won by Alex Cano of Antioquia Department. The best young rider was won by Daniel Jaramillo also of Antioquia Department. The best Mexican award was won by Carlos Lopez of Canels–Turbo for the second time. The team classification was won by Antioquia Department.
