= Matti Manninen =

Finnish bicycle racer

Personal information
- Full name: Matti Manninen
- Born: 20 July 1992 (age 34) Pori, Finland
- Height: 1.77 m (5 ft 10 in)
- Weight: 70 kg (154 lb)

Cycling career
- Sport: Cycling
- Current team: GIF–Chebici
- Discipline: Road
- Role: Rider

Amateur teams
- 2012–2013: Zannata Cycling Team
- 2014: Team Bliz–Merida
- 2018–: Gamlakarleby IF

Professional teams
- 2015: Team Raleigh
- 2016: Team Bliz–Merida
- 2017: Team FixIT.no

Matti Manninen (born 20 July 1992, in Pori) is a Finnish cyclist, who currently rides for Finnish amateur team GIF–Chebici.

== Major results ==
2010
1st Road race, National Junior Road Championships
2012
National Under-23 Road Championships

1st Road race
3rd Time trial

2013
National Under-23 Road Championships

1st Time trial
1st Road race

2014
1st Time trial, National Under-23 Road Championships
5th Road race, UEC European Under-23 Road Championships
2015
2nd Overall Baltic Chain Tour

1st Stage 1

2016
1st Overall Dookoła Mazowsza

1st Stage 2

1st Stage 1 Tour of Szeklerland
4th Scandinavian Race Uppsala
7th Tour de Ribas
9th Odessa Grand Prix
10th Grand Prix of ISD
2017
1st Road race, National Road Championships
1st Stage 3 Tour de Hongrie
4th Scandinavian Race Uppsala
