= Larry Warbasse =

American road cyclist

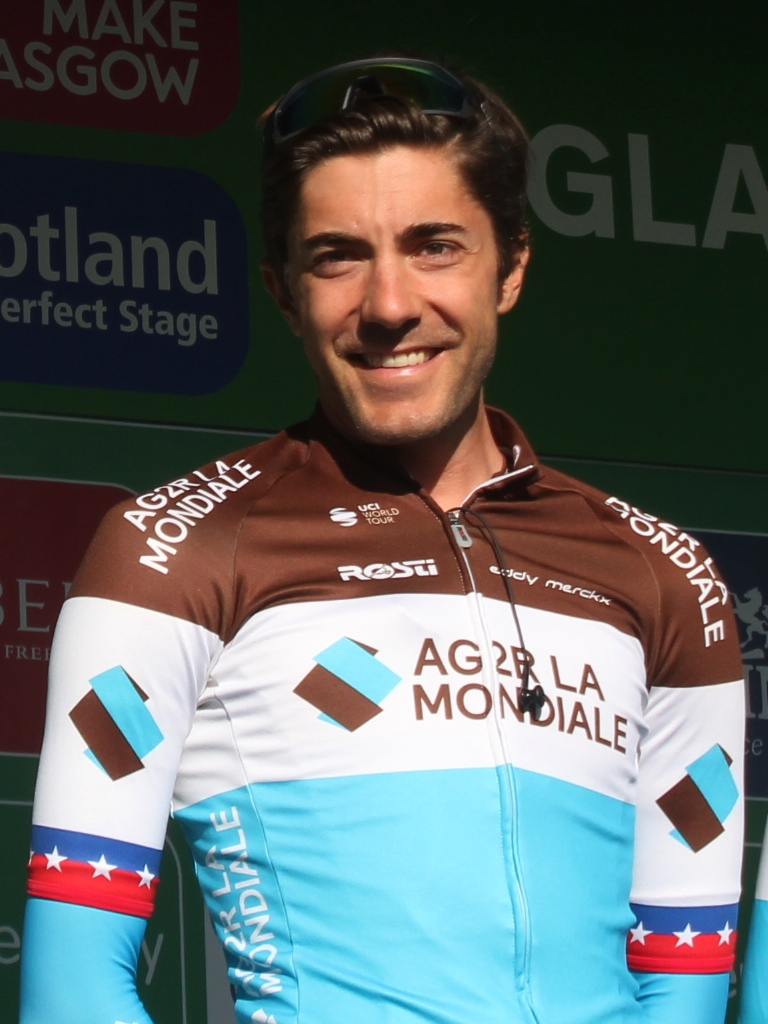
- Warbasse at the 2019 Tour of Britain

Personal information
- Full name: Lawrence Warbasse
- Born: June 28, 1990 (age 36) Dearborn, Michigan, United States
- Height: 1.83 m (6 ft 0 in)
- Weight: 67 kg (148 lb)

Cycling career
- Sport: Cycling
- Current team: Tudor Pro Cycling Team
- Discipline: Road
- Role: Rider
- Rider type: Rouleur

Amateur teams
- 2006–2008: Priority Health Cycling
- 2009: Team Waste Management
- 2012: → BMC Racing Team (stagiaire)

Professional teams
- 2010–2012: Hincapie Development Team
- 2013–2014: BMC Racing Team
- 2015–2016: IAM Cycling
- 2017–2018: Aqua Blue Sport
- 2019–2024: AG2R La Mondiale
- 2025–: Tudor Pro Cycling Team

Major wins
- One-day races and classics National Road Race Championships (2017)

Lawrence Warbasse (born June 28, 1990) is an American professional road racing cyclist, who currently rides for UCI ProTeam Tudor Pro Cycling Team. Best known for winning the 2017 United States National Road Race Championships, Warbasse has also competed for UCI WorldTeams BMC Racing Team and IAM Cycling.

== Career ==
Born in Dearborn, Michigan, Warbasse currently resides in Traverse City, Michigan, United States. Warbasse is a University of Michigan graduate. He was named in the start list for the 2016 Giro d'Italia, but abandoned the race on Stage 6.

Warbasse's career took a step forward with Aqua Blue Sport in 2017, as he won his first individual race as a professional in stage 4 of the Tour de Suisse, before capturing the pro rider classification at the United States National Road Race Championships in Knoxville, Tennessee. After Aqua Blue Sport announced that it was folding in August 2018, Warbasse was able to secure a contract with AG2R La Mondiale for the 2019 season.

In 2019, Warbasse finished in the top 5 in both the road race and the time trial at the United States National Road Championships. In the 2020 Giro d'Italia, he finished 17th, a career best, just behind French teammate Aurélien Paret-Peintre; the pair were the best placed AG2R La Mondiale riders in the race.

== Major results ==
2008
9th Overall Tour de l'Abitibi
2011
5th Time trial, National Under-23 Road Championships
5th Overall Tour de Berlin
5th Liège–Bastogne–Liège Espoirs
7th Overall Istrian Spring Trophy
7th Overall Flèche du Sud
8th Gran Premio Palio del Recioto
2012
4th Time trial, National Under-23 Road Championships
5th Overall Ronde de l'Isard
6th Chrono Champenois
8th Gran Premio Palio del Recioto
2013
1st Stage 2 (TTT) Tour of Qatar
2015
8th Overall Bayern–Rundfahrt
2016
7th Overall Tour de Pologne
2017
National Road Championships

1st Road race
5th Time trial

1st Stage 4 Tour de Suisse
8th Overall Tour of Norway
2018
4th Time trial, National Road Championships
10th La Drôme Classic
2019
National Road Championships

4th Time trial
5th Road race

2024
5th Overall Tour Poitou-Charentes en Nouvelle-Aquitaine
2025
7th Maryland Cycling Classic
2026
2nd Time trial, National Road Championships

=== Grand Tour general classification results timeline ===
Grand Tour	2014	2015	2016	2017	2018	2019	2020	2021	2022	2023	2024
Giro d'Italia	—	—	DNF	—	—	52	17	41	—	44	37
Tour de France	Has not contested during his career										
Vuelta a España	74	38	49	DNF	—	—	—	—	—	44	—

Legend
—	Did not compete
DNF	Did not finish
