= Elias Angell Spikseth =

Norwegian cyclist

Personal information
- Born: 13 July 1990 (age 36)

Cycling career
- Sport: Cycling
- Current team: Team FixIT.no
- Discipline: Road
- Role: Rider

Professional teams
- 2012: OneCo–Mesterhus
- 2013–2014: Team Frøy–Bianchi
- 2017–: Team FixIT.no

Elias Angell Spikseth (born 13 July 1990) is a Norwegian racing cyclist. He competed in the men's team time trial event at the 2017 UCI Road World Championships.
