= Jozef Palčák =

Slovak bicycle racer

Personal information
- Full name: Jozef Palčák
- Born: 17 December 1987 (age 38)

Cycling career
- Sport: Cycling
- Current team: Retired
- Discipline: Road
- Role: Rider
- Rider type: Time trialist

Professional teams
- 2014–2015: CK Banská Bystrica
- 2016–2017: Dukla Banská Bystrica

Jozef Palčák (born 17 December 1987) is a Slovak former professional cyclist, who rode professionally between 2014 and 2017 for the CK Banská Bystrica and Dukla Banská Bystrica teams.

== Major results ==
2007
5th Grand Prix Bradlo
7th Overall Tour de Guadeloupe
2008
1st Stage 7 Tour du Sénégal
6th Overall Grand Prix Chantal Biya
2009
10th Overall Grand Prix Chantal Biya
10th Overall Tour du Faso
2010
1st Stage 5 Tour du Cameroun
1st Stage 3 Grand Prix Chantal Biya
2014
8th Overall Grand Prix Chantal Biya
2016
9th Overall Tour du Cameroun
