= Sander Armée =

Belgian road cyclist

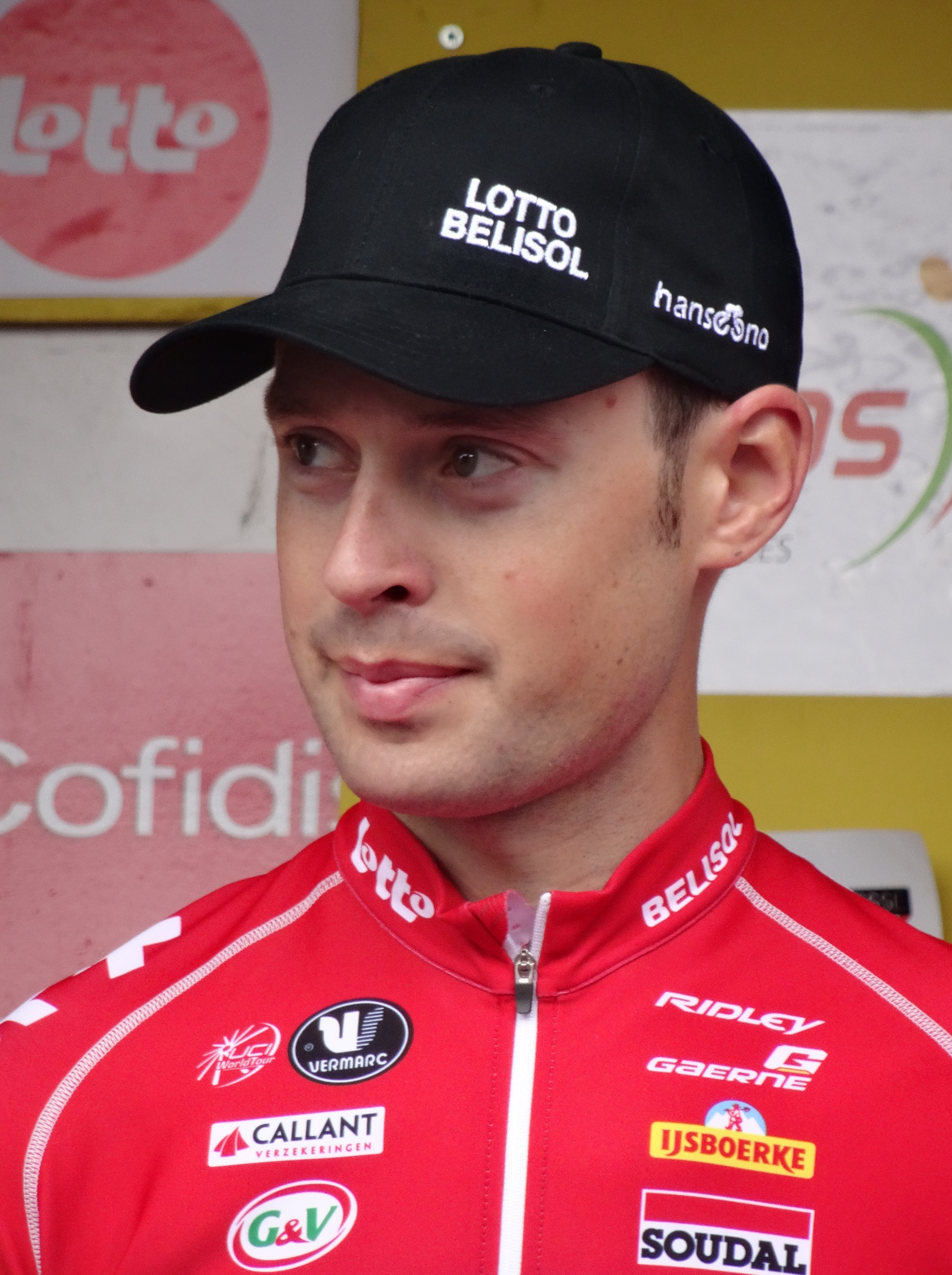
- Armee at the 2014 Tour de l'Eurométropole.

Personal information
- Full name: Sander Armée
- Born: 10 December 1985 (age 40) Leuven, Flanders, Belgium
- Height: 1.90 m (6 ft 3 in)
- Weight: 71 kg (157 lb; 11.2 st)

Cycling career
- Sport: Cycling
- Current team: Retired
- Discipline: Road
- Role: Rider

Amateur teams
- 2004: Olympia Tienen
- 2005–2006: Hand in Hand Baal
- 2007–2008: Profel Ziegler Continental Team
- 2009: Beveren 2000

Professional teams
- 2010–2013: Topsport Vlaanderen–Mercator
- 2014–2020: Lotto–Belisol
- 2021: Team Qhubeka Assos
- 2022: Cofidis

Major wins
- Grand Tours Vuelta a España 1 individual stage (2017)

Sander Armée (born 10 December 1985) is a Belgian former professional road racing cyclist, who competed as a professional from 2010 to 2022.

== Biography ==
=== Childhood and amateur career ===
Born in Leuven, Flanders, Armée participated in athletics, cycling, and skating during his childhood. In 2007, he was recruited by the Belgian continental cycling team Profel Ziegler. He won five races in 2007 and six in 2008.

=== Professional career ===
Armée became a professional rider in 2010, signing for the professional continental team Topsport Vlaanderen–Mercator. He placed seventh in the Star Bessèges and nineteenth in the Tour of Belgium.

After four years with the team, Armée joined Lotto–Belisol for the 2014 season. He remained with the team until the end of the 2020 season, before joining Team Qhubeka Assos. In November 2021, Armée signed a contract with Cofidis for the 2022 season.

== Major results ==
2007
2nd Circuit de Wallonie
6th Ronde van Vlaanderen U23
2008
4th Memorial Van Coningsloo
8th Flèche Ardennaise
9th Circuit de Wallonie
2009
1st Kattekoers
1st Flèche Ardennaise
7th Overall Tour de Bretagne

1st Stages 4 & 7

2010
7th Overall Étoile de Bessèges
2012
4th Overall Tour of Norway
10th Druivenkoers Overijse
2013
3rd Omloop van het Waasland
5th Grand Prix d'Ouverture La Marseillaise
6th Volta Limburg Classic
8th Overall Vuelta a Andalucía
2016
1st Mountains classification Tour de Romandie
5th Overall Tour of Norway
2017
Vuelta a España

1st Stage 18
Combativity award Stage 15

1st Mountains classification Tour de Romandie
2nd Overall Four Days of Dunkirk
4th Overall Tour of Norway
2019
9th Overall Tour of Norway
2020
1st Stage 3a Tour Poitou-Charentes en Nouvelle-Aquitaine
5th Trofeo Serra de Tramuntana

=== Grand Tour general classification results timeline ===
Grand Tour	2014	2015	2016	2017	2018	2019	2020	2021
Giro d'Italia	47	65	—	—	57	—	47	—
Tour de France	Has not contested during his career							
Vuelta a España	103	—	90	19	73	73	—	DNF

Legend
—	Did not compete
DNF	Did not finish
