= Ahmed Galdoune =

Moroccan cyclist (born 1996)

Personal information
- Full name: Ahmed Amine Galdoune
- Born: 31 May 1996 (age 30)

Cycling career
- Sport: Cycling
- Disciplines: Road; Track
- Role: Rider
- Rider type: Sprinter

Amateur teams
- 2015: Team Colpack
- 2016–2018: Delio Gallina Colosio Eurofeed
- 2019: Namedsport–Rocket

Professional teams
- 2018: Kőbánya Cycling Team
- 2020: Sidi Ali Pro Cycling

Ahmed Amine Galdoune (born 31 May 1996) is a Moroccan cyclist, who most recently rode for UCI Continental team Sidi Ali Pro Cycling.

== Major results ==
2014
1st Time trial, National Junior Road Championships
2016
African Track Championships

1st Keirin
3rd Points race

1st Stage 2 Tour de Hongrie
2017
1st GP Sakia El Hamra, Les Challenges de la Marche Verte
Challenge du Prince

1st Trophée de la Maison Royale
2nd Trophée de l'Anniversaire

3rd Road race, African Road Championships
