= Kristoffer Madsen =

Norwegian cyclist

Personal information
- Born: 6 June 1996 (age 30)

Cycling career
- Sport: Cycling
- Current team: Team FixIT.no
- Discipline: Road
- Role: Rider

Amateur team
- 2015: Team FixIT.no (stagiaire)

Professional team
- 2016–: Team FixIT.no

Kristoffer Madsen (born 6 June 1996) is a Norwegian racing cyclist. He competed in the men's team time trial event at the 2017 UCI Road World Championships.
