= Ken-Levi Eikeland =

Norwegian cyclist (born 1994)

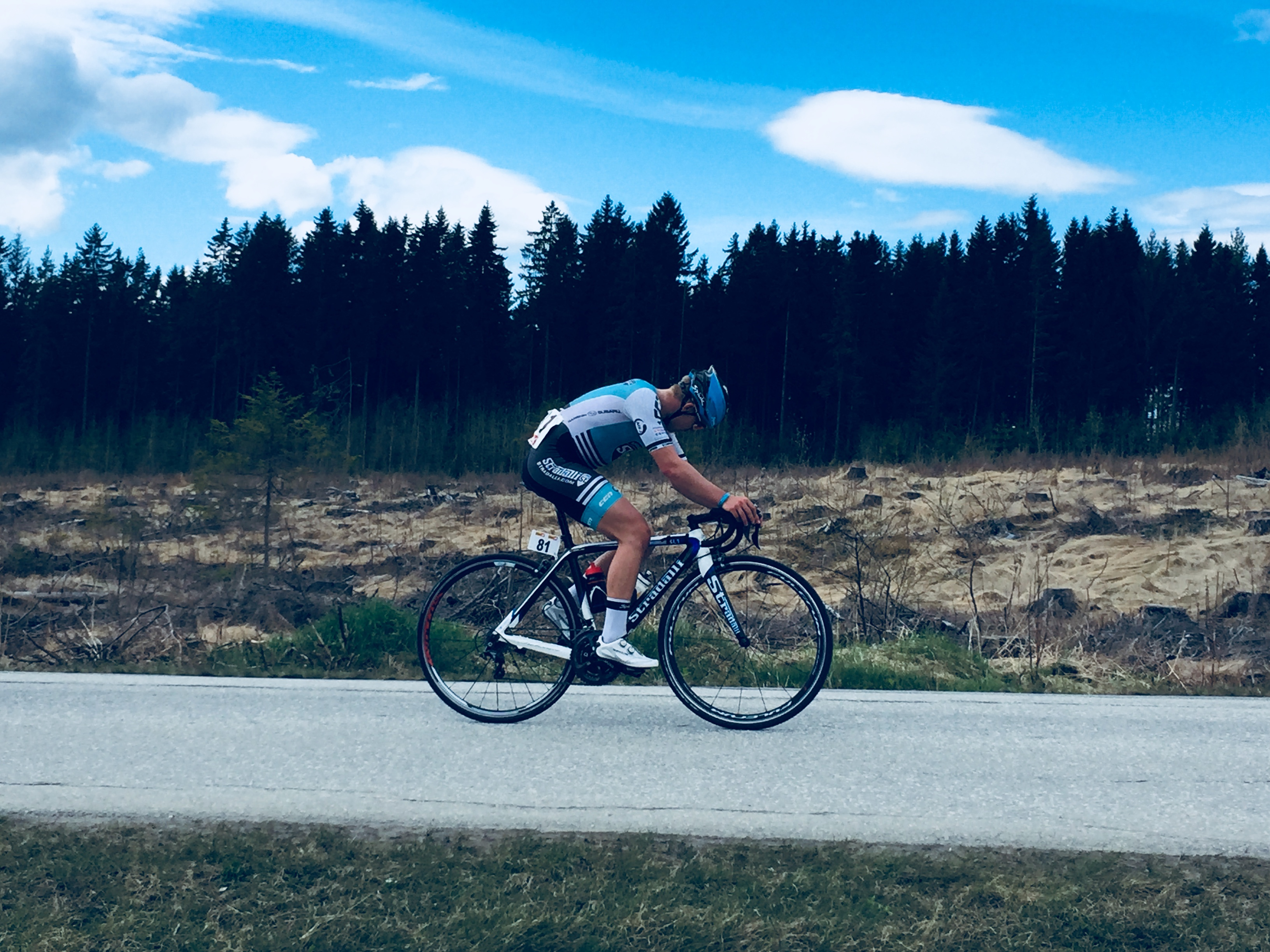

Personal information
- Born: 9 October 1994 (age 32) Larvik, Norway

Cycling career
- Sport: Cycling
- Current team: Team FixIT.no
- Discipline: Road
- Role: Rider

Professional team
- 2016–: Team FixIT.no

Ken-Levi Eikeland (born 9 October 1994) is a Norwegian racing cyclist. He competed in the men's team time trial event at the 2017 UCI Road World Championships.

== Major results ==
2016
1st Stage 1 Carpathian Couriers Race
