= Jelle Donders =

Belgian cyclist

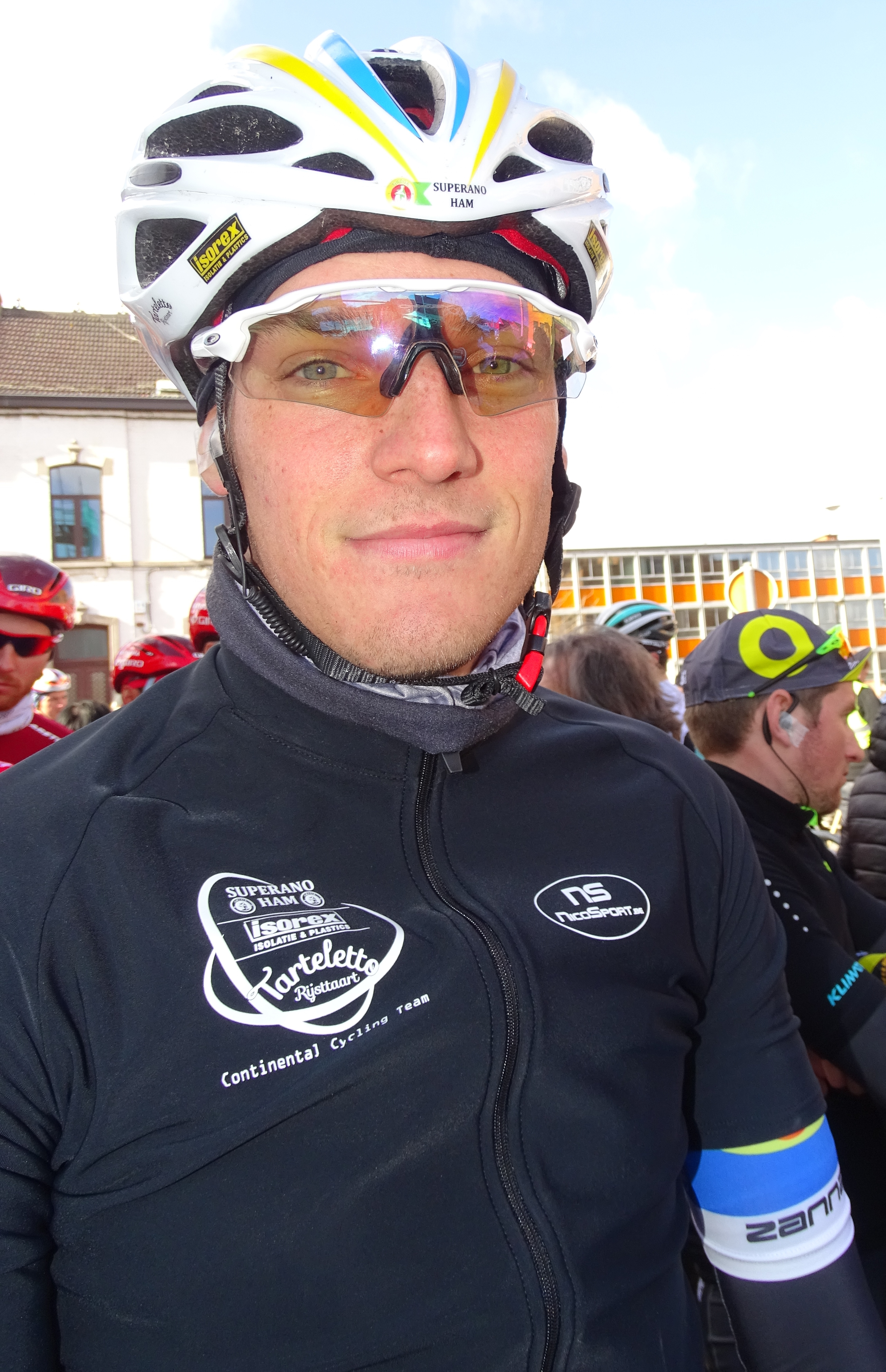
- Donders in 2016

Personal information
- Full name: Jelle Donders
- Born: 18 June 1993 (age 33) Bornem, Belgium

Cycling career
- Sport: Cycling
- Discipline: Road
- Role: Rider

Amateur team
- 2012–2014: Rupelspurters Boom

Professional teams
- 2015–2016: Colba–Superano Ham
- 2017–2018: Differdange–Losch
- 2019: Dauner–Akkon

Jelle Donders (born 18 June 1993) is a Belgian cyclist, who last rode for UCI Continental team Dauner–Akkon.

== Major results ==
2014
3rd Road race, National Under-23 Road Championships
2016
3rd De Kustpijl
2017
3rd Grand Prix Criquielion
8th Grand Prix de la Somme
2018
4th Ronde van Limburg
