= Žiga Jerman =

Slovenian cyclist (born 1998)

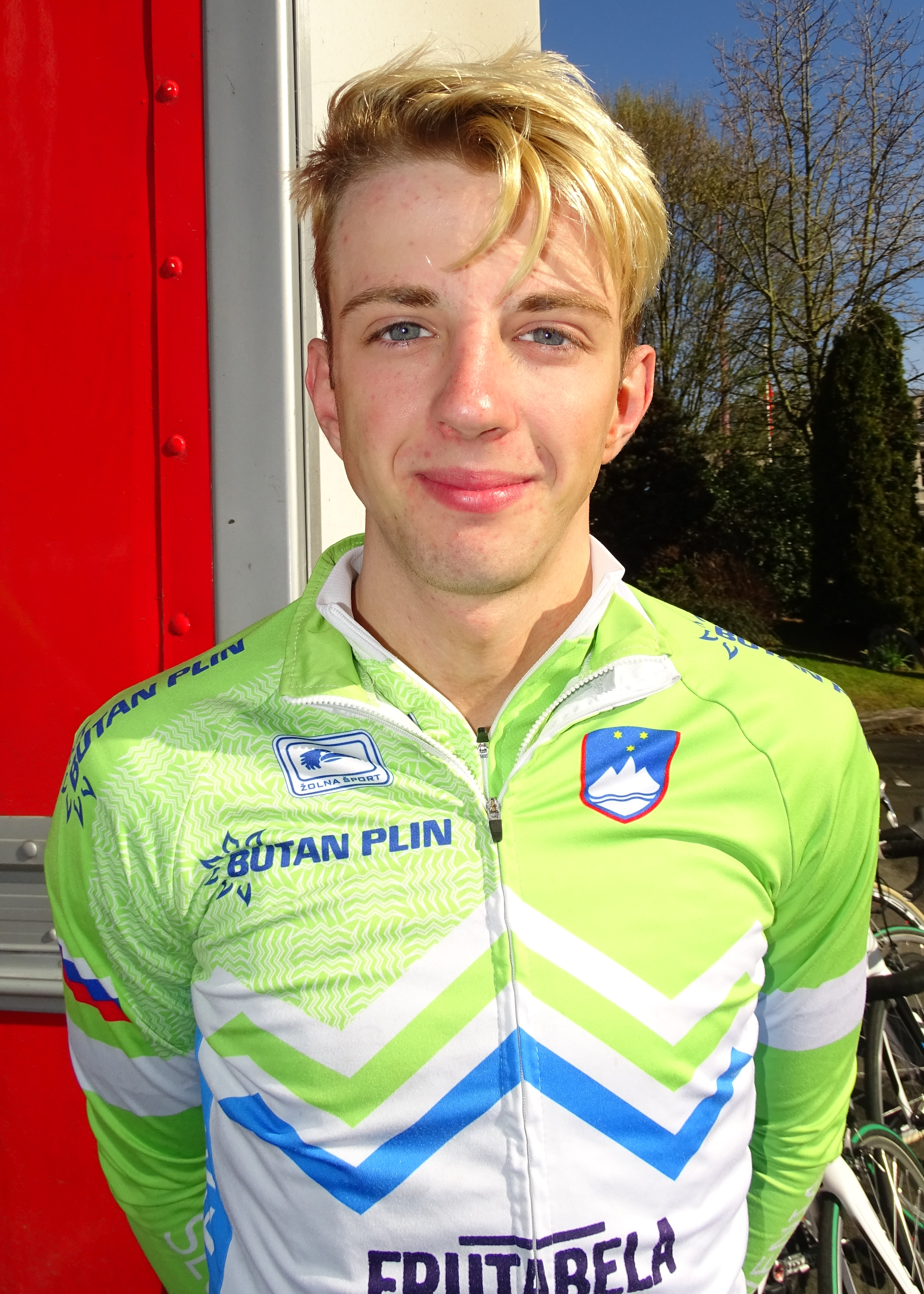
- Jerman in 2016

Personal information
- Full name: Žiga Jerman
- Born: 26 June 1998 (age 28) Ljubljana, Slovenia
- Height: 178 cm (5 ft 10 in)
- Weight: 67 kg (148 lb)

Cycling career
- Sport: Cycling
- Current team: Retired
- Discipline: Road
- Role: Rider

Amateur team
- 2019: Groupama–FDJ (stagiaire)

Professional teams
- 2017–2018: Rog–Ljubljana
- 2019–2020: Équipe Continentale Groupama–FDJ
- 2020: Groupama–FDJ (development) (Note: Riding for Groupama–FDJ, Jerman competed at the Brussels Cycling Classic, and the Grand Prix d'Isbergues, following the introduction of a UCI rule allowing riders registered with a development team to participate in UCI ProSeries or Class 1 events.)
- 2021: Androni Giocattoli–Sidermec
- 2022: Ljubljana Gusto Santic

Žiga Jerman (born 26 June 1998) is a Slovenian former racing cyclist, who competed as a professional from 2017 to 2022.

== Major results ==
2015
2nd Gran Premio dell'Arno
5th Piccola SanRemo
5th Trofeo Pietro Merelli
2016
1st Trofeo Pietro Merelli
2nd Road race, National Junior Road Championships
6th Road race, UCI Junior Road World Championships
2017
1st Stage 2 Tour de Hongrie
2nd GP Kranj
5th Umag Trophy
2018
1st Ghent–Wevelgem U23
2nd Gran Premio della Liberazione
5th ZLM Tour
2019
2nd Entre Brenne et Montmorillonnais
3rd Grand Prix Criquielion
5th Étoile d'or
6th Ronde van Vlaanderen Beloften
2020
8th Poreč Trophy
2021
7th Overall Belgrade Banjaluka
