= Guy Gabay =

Israeli cyclist

Guy Gabay גיא גבאי
Personal information
- Born: 18 July 1993 (age 33)

Cycling career
- Sport: Cycling
- Discipline: Road
- Role: Rider

Professional team
- 2015–2016: Cycling Academy

Guy Gabay (Hebrew: גיא גבאי; born 18 July 1993) is an Israeli former racing cyclist, who rode for the Cycling Academy team in 2015 and 2016. He won the 2016 Hets Hatsafon, and was a two-time runner-up in national road championship races.
