= CK Banská Bystrica =

Slovak cycling team

CK Banska Bystrica
Team information
- Registered: Slovakia
- Founded: 2011
- Discipline: Road
- Status: UCI Continental

Team name history
- 2011–: Cycling Academy Team

CK Banska Bystrica is a UCI Continental team founded in 2011 and based in Slovakia. It participates in UCI Continental Circuits races.
