= Marius Blålid =

Norwegian cyclist

Personal information
- Born: 23 January 1993 (age 33)

Cycling career
- Sport: Cycling
- Current team: Team FixIT.no
- Discipline: Road
- Role: Rider

Professional team
- 2017–: Team FixIT.no

Marius Blålid (born 23 January 1993) is a Norwegian racing cyclist. He competed in the men's team time trial event at the 2017 UCI Road World Championships.
