= Åsmund Løvik =

Norwegian cyclist

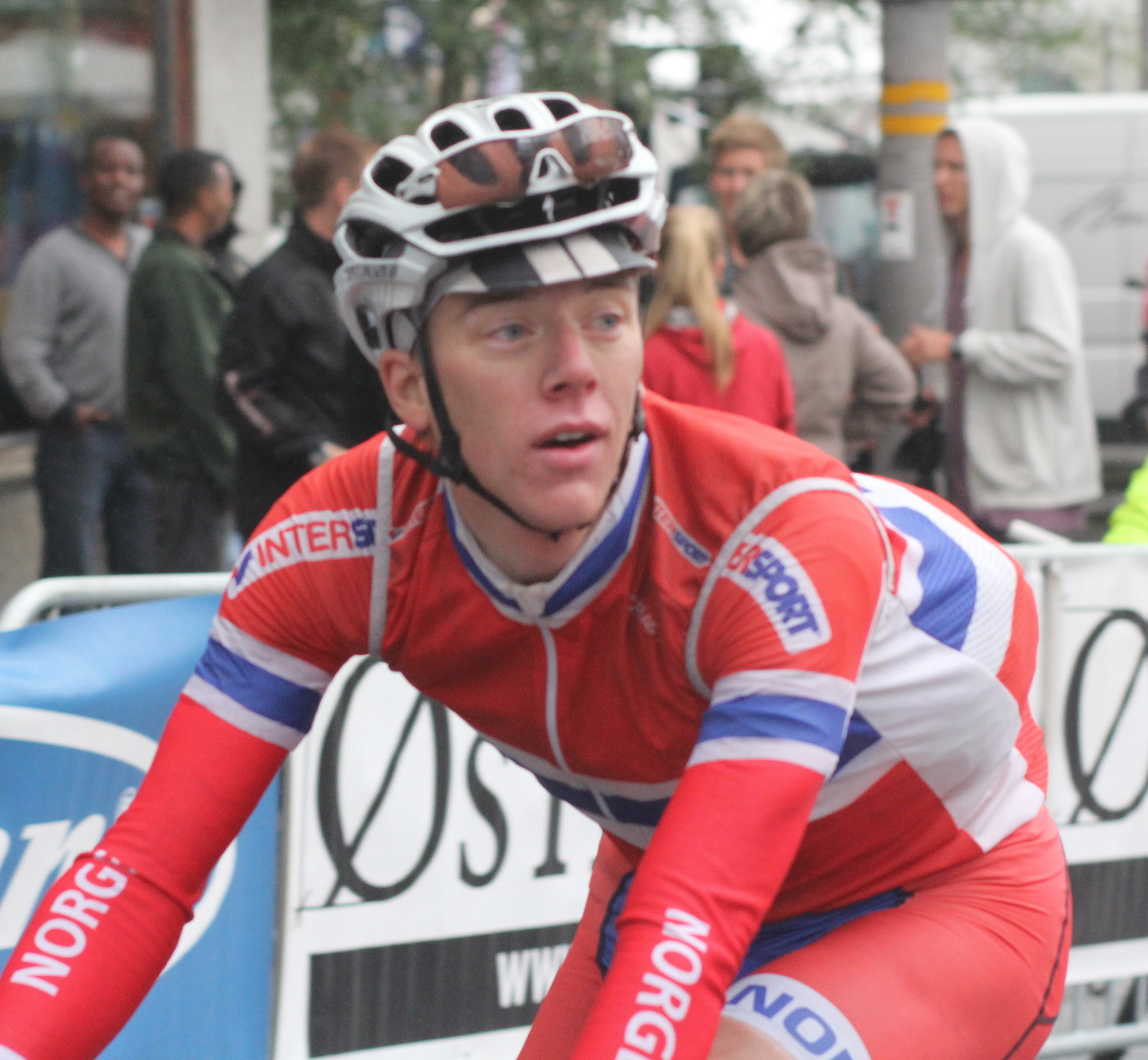
- Åsmund Løvik in 2013

Personal information
- Full name: Åsmund Romstad Løvik
- Born: 1 May 1989 (age 37) Jar, Norway

Cycling career
- Sport: Cycling
- Current team: Team FixIT.no
- Discipline: Road
- Role: Rider

Professional teams
- 2014: Motiv3
- 2015–: Team FixIT.no

Åsmund Romstad Løvik (born 1 May 1989) is a Norwegian racing cyclist. He competed in the men's team time trial event at the 2017 UCI Road World Championships.

== Major results ==
2014
5th Hadeland GP
2016
3rd Sundvolden GP
10th Overall Tour de Hongrie
2017
2nd Overall Tour of Rhodes
