= Team FixIT.no =

Norwegian cycling team

Team Fixit.no
Team information
- UCI code: FIX
- Registered: Norway
- Founded: 2014
- Disbanded: 2017
- Discipline: Road
- Status: UCI Continental
- Bicycles: Look
- Website: Team home page

Key personnel
- Team manager: Frode Jarle Jacobsen

Team name history
- 2014–2017: Team Fixit.no

Team Fixit.no was a UCI Continental team founded in 2014 and based in Norway. It participates in UCI Continental Circuits races. The team disbanded at the end of the 2017 season.

== Team roster ==
Rider	Date of birth
Marius Blålid (NOR)	23 January 1993 (age 33)
Jon Sæverås Breivold (NOR)	19 February 1995 (age 31)
Ken-Levi Eikeland (NOR)	9 October 1994 (age 31)
Sindre Eid Hermansen (NOR)	17 September 1993 (age 32)
Andreas Skæjlo Jacobsen (NOR)	16 July 1996 (age 30)
Jan William Jensen (NOR)	9 February 1994 (age 32)

Rider	Date of birth
Åsmund Løvik (NOR)	1 May 1989 (age 37)
Kristoffer Madsen (NOR)	6 June 1996 (age 30)
Matti Manninen (FIN)	20 July 1992 (age 34)
Bjørnar Øverland (NOR)	19 August 1995 (age 31)
Henrik Sandal (NOR)	30 July 1995 (age 31)
Elias Angell Spikseth (NOR)	13 July 1990 (age 36)

== Major wins ==
2015
Stages 9 & 10 Tour du Maroc, Filip Eidsheim

2017
Finland National Road Race Championships, Matti Manninen
Stage 3 Tour de Hongrie, Matti Manninen
