= 2018 Tour de Hongrie =

2018 UCI Europe Tour

Race details
- Dates: 14–19 August
- Stages: 5 + Prologue
- Distance: 865 km (537 mi)
- Winning time: 19h 21' 07"

Results
Jersey awarded to the overall winner	Winner	Manuel Belletti (ITA)	(Androni Giocattoli–Sidermec)
	Second	Kamil Małecki (POL)	(CCC–Sprandi–Polkowice)
	Third	Paolo Totò (ITA)	(Sangemini–MG.K Vis Vega)
Jersey awarded to the points classification winner	Points	Manuel Belletti (ITA)	(Androni Giocattoli–Sidermec)
Jersey awarded to the mountains classification winner	Mountains	Patryk Stosz (POL)	(CCC–Sprandi–Polkowice)
	Team	CCC–Sprandi–Polkowice	

The 2018 Tour de Hongrie was a road cycling stage race that took place in Hungary between 14 and 19 August 2018. It was the fourth edition of the Tour de Hongrie since its revival in 2015, and was rated as a 2.1 event as part of the 2018 UCI Europe Tour.

== Route ==
Stages of the 2018 Tour de Hongrie
Stage	Date	Route	Distance	Type	Winner
P	14 August	Siófok	3.5 km (2.2 mi)	Individual time trial	Patrick Schelling (SUI)
1	15 August	Balatonalmádi to Keszthely	154 km (95.7 mi)	Hilly stage	Manuel Belletti (ITA)
2	16 August	Velence to Székesfehérvár	190 km (118.1 mi)	Hilly stage	Matteo Moschetti (ITA)
3	17 August	Cegléd to Hajdúszoboszló	206 km (128.0 mi)	Plain stage	Andrii Bratashchuk (UKR)
4	18 August	Karcag to Miskolc	182 km (113.1 mi)	Intermediate stage	Nikodemus Holler (GER)
5	19 August	Kazincbarcika to Kazincbarcika	128 km (79.5 mi)	Hilly stage	Nikodemus Holler (GER)
Total			865 km (537 mi)		

== Teams ==
Nineteen teams were invited to start the race. These included three UCI Professional Continentals, thirteen UCI Continental teams and three UCI Continental teams.

UCI Professional Continental teams

- Androni Giocattoli–Sidermec
- Team Novo Nordisk
- CCC–Sprandi–Polkowice

UCI Continental teams

- Differdange–Losch
- Pardus–TUFO Prostějov
- Sangemini–MG.K Vis Vega
- Ljubljana Gusto Xaurum
- Dukla Banská Bystrica
- Bike Aid
- Dimension Data for Qhubeka
- Team Novak
- My Bike–Stevens
- Team Vorarlberg Santic
- Polartec–Kometa
- Kőbánya Cycling Team
- Pannon Cycling Team

National team

- Hungary
- Romania
- Serbia

== Stages ==
=== Prologue ===
14 August 2018 — Siófok, 3.5 km (2 mi)

Result and General Classification after the Prologue
Rank	Rider	Team	Time
1	Patrick Schelling (SUI)	Team Vorarlberg Santic	4' 32"
2	Charles Planet (FRA)	Team Novo Nordisk	+ 1"
3	Manuel Belletti (ITA)	Androni Giocattoli–Sidermec	+ 1"
4	Maximillian Kuen (AUT)	My Bike–Stevens	+ 2"
5	Paolo Totò (ITA)	Sangemini–MG.K Vis Vega	+ 4"

=== Stage 1 ===
15 August 2018 — Balatonalmádi to Keszthely, 154 km (96 mi)

Result of Stage 1
Rank	Rider	Team	Time
1	Manuel Belletti (ITA)	Androni Giocattoli–Sidermec	3h 36' 18"
2	Matteo Moschetti (ITA)	Polartec–Kometa	s.t.
3	Kamil Małecki (POL)	CCC–Sprandi–Polkowice	s.t.
4	Paolo Totò (ITA)	Sangemini–MG.K Vis Vega	s.t.
5	Jannik Steimle (GER)	Team Vorarlberg Santic	s.t.

General classification after Stage 1
Rank	Rider	Team	Time
1	Manuel Belletti (ITA)	Androni Giocattoli–Sidermec	3h 32' 34"
2	Patrick Schelling (SUI)	Team Vorarlberg Santic	+ 9"
3	Charles Planet (FRA)	Team Novo Nordisk	+ 10"
4	Maximillian Kuen (AUT)	My Bike–Stevens	+ 11"
5	Gian Friesecke (SUI)	Team Vorarlberg Santic	+ 12"

=== Stage 2 ===
16 August 2018 — Velence to Székesfehérvár, 190 km (118 mi)

Result of Stage 2
Rank	Rider	Team	Time
1	Matteo Moschetti (ITA)	Polartec–Kometa	4h 14' 07"
2	Attilio Viviani (ITA)	Sangemini–MG.K Vis Vega	s.t.
3	Manuel Belletti (ITA)	Androni Giocattoli–Sidermec	s.t.
4	František Sisr (CZE)	CCC–Sprandi–Polkowice	s.t.
5	Ahmed Galdoune (MAR)	Kőbánya Cycling Team	s.t.

General classification after Stage 2
Rank	Rider	Team	Time
1	Manuel Belletti (ITA)	Androni Giocattoli–Sidermec	7h 54' 44"
2	Matteo Moschetti (ITA)	Polartec–Kometa	+ 6"
3	Charles Planet (FRA)	Team Novo Nordisk	+ 13"
4	Maximillian Kuen (AUT)	My Bike–Stevens	+ 15"
5	Gian Friesecke (SUI)	Team Vorarlberg Santic	+ 16"

=== Stage 3 ===
17 August 2018 — Cegléd to Hajdúszoboszló, 206 km (128 mi)

Result of Stage 3
Rank	Rider	Team	Time
1	Andrii Bratashchuk (UKR)	Team Novak	4h 31' 04"
2	Manuel Belletti (ITA)	Androni Giocattoli–Sidermec	+ 2"
3	Ahmed Galdoune (MAR)	Kőbánya Cycling Team	s.t.
4	Joeri Stallaert (BEL)	Team Vorarlberg Santic	s.t.
5	Luca Mozzato (ITA)	Dimension Data for Qhubeka	s.t.

General classification after Stage 3
Rank	Rider	Team	Time
1	Manuel Belletti (ITA)	Androni Giocattoli–Sidermec	12h 25' 44"
2	Matteo Moschetti (ITA)	Polartec–Kometa	+ 12"
3	Charles Planet (FRA)	Team Novo Nordisk	+ 21"
4	Paolo Totò (ITA)	Sangemini–MG.K Vis Vega	+ 21"
5	Paweł Bernas (POL)	CCC–Sprandi–Polkowice	+ 23"

=== Stage 4 ===
18 August 2018 — Karcag to Miskolc, 182 km (113 mi)

Result of Stage 4
Rank	Rider	Team	Time
1	Nikodemus Holler (GER)	Team Novak	4h 08' 44"
2	Manuel Belletti (ITA)	Androni Giocattoli–Sidermec	s.t.
3	Kamil Małecki (POL)	CCC–Sprandi–Polkowice	s.t.
4	Paolo Totò (ITA)	Sangemini–MG.K Vis Vega	s.t.
5	Attila Valter (HUN)	Pannon Cycling Team	s.t.

General classification after Stage 4
Rank	Rider	Team	Time
1	Manuel Belletti (ITA)	Androni Giocattoli–Sidermec	16h 34' 19"
2	Paolo Totò (ITA)	Sangemini–MG.K Vis Vega	+ 30"
3	Patrick Schelling (SUI)	Team Vorarlberg Santic	+ 32"
4	Kamil Małecki (POL)	CCC–Sprandi–Polkowice	+ 36"
5	Leszek Pluciński (POL)	CCC–Sprandi–Polkowice	+ 51"

=== Stage 5 ===
19 August 2018 — Kazincbarcika to Kazincbarcika, 128 km (80 mi)

Result of Stage 5
Rank	Rider	Team	Time
1	Nikodemus Holler (GER)	Team Novak	2h 46' 48"
2	Matteo Moschetti (ITA)	Polartec–Kometa	s.t.
3	Kamil Małecki (POL)	CCC–Sprandi–Polkowice	s.t.
4	Luca Mozzato (ITA)	Pannon Cycling Team	s.t.
5	Attilio Viviani (ITA)	Sangemini–MG.K Vis Vega	s.t.

Final general classification
Rank	Rider	Team	Time
1	Manuel Belletti (ITA)	Androni Giocattoli–Sidermec	19h 21' 07"
2	Kamil Małecki (POL)	CCC–Sprandi–Polkowice	+ 27"
3	Paolo Totò (ITA)	Sangemini–MG.K Vis Vega	+ 28"
4	Patrick Schelling (SUI)	Team Vorarlberg Santic	+ 31"
5	Nikodemus Holler (GER)	Team Novak	+ 45"

== Classification leadership table ==
Classification leadership by stage
Stage	Winner	General classification	Points classification	Mountains classification	Best Hungarian rider	Team classification
P	Patrick Schelling	Patrick Schelling	not awarded	not awarded	Bence Lóki	Team Vorarlberg Santic
1	Manuel Belletti	Manuel Belletti	Manuel Belletti	Patryk Stosz	Márton Dina	Team Vorarlberg Santic
2	Matteo Moschetti	Manuel Belletti	Matteo Moschetti	Patryk Stosz	Márton Dina	Team Vorarlberg Santic
3	Andrii Bratashchuk	Manuel Belletti	Manuel Belletti	Patryk Stosz	Márton Dina	Team Vorarlberg Santic
4	Nikodemus Holler	Manuel Belletti	Manuel Belletti	Patryk Stosz	Attila Valter	CCC–Sprandi–Polkowice
5	Nikodemus Holler	Manuel Belletti	Manuel Belletti	Patryk Stosz	Attila Valter	CCC–Sprandi–Polkowice
Final		Manuel Belletti	Manuel Belletti	Patryk Stosz	Attila Valter	CCC–Sprandi–Polkowice

== Standings ==
Legend
Yellow jersey	Denotes the leader of the general classification	Green jersey	Denotes the leader of the points classification
Red jersey	Denotes the leader of the mountains classification	White jersey	Denotes the leader of the best Hungarian rider classification

=== General classification ===
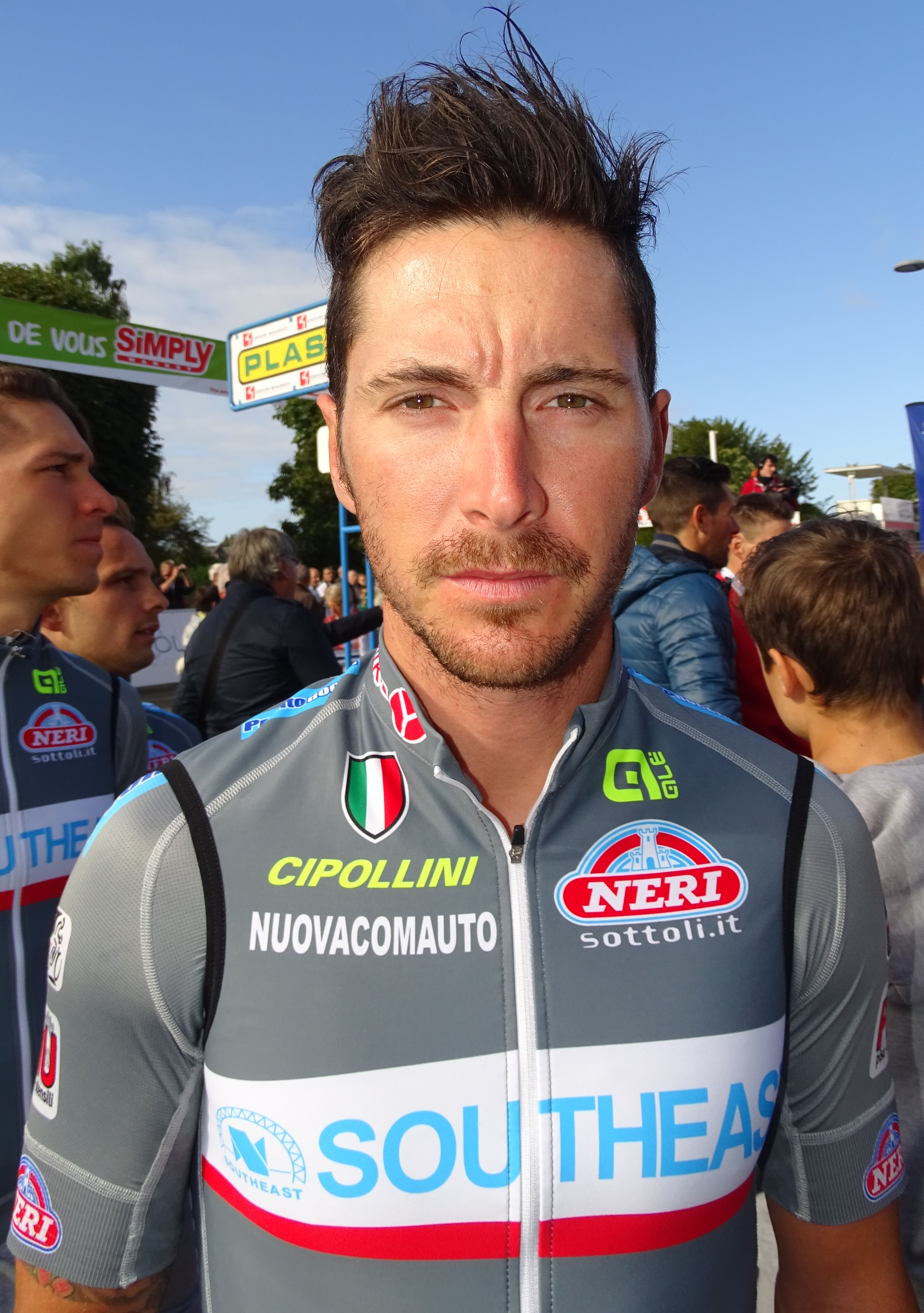
Manuel Belletti (pictured in 2015)

General classification (1–10)
Rank	Rider	Team	Time
1	Manuel Belletti (ITA)	Androni Giocattoli–Sidermec	19h 21' 07"
2	Kamil Małecki (POL)	CCC–Sprandi–Polkowice	+ 27"
3	Paolo Totò (ITA)	Sangemini–MG.K Vis Vega	+ 28"
4	Patrick Schelling (SUI)	Team Vorarlberg Santic	+ 31"
5	Nikodemus Holler (GER)	Bike Aid	+ 45"
6	Leszek Pluciński (POL)	CCC–Sprandi–Polkowice	+ 51"
7	Oleksandr Prevar (UKR)	Team Novak	+ 51"
8	Adrian Kurek (POL)	CCC–Sprandi–Polkowice	+ 57"
9	Fausto Masnada (ITA)	Androni Giocattoli–Sidermec	+ 1' 04"
10	Matteo Spreafico (ITA)	Androni Giocattoli–Sidermec	+ 1' 13"

Final general classification (11–105)
Rank	Rider	Team	Time
11	Michele Gazzara (ITA)	Sangemini–MG.K Vis Vega	+ 1' 14"
12	Nicola Gaffurini (ITA)	Sangemini–MG.K Vis Vega	+ 1' 31"
13	Maximillian Kuen (AUT)	My Bike–Stevens	+ 1' 41"
14	Nicolae Tanovițchii (MDA)	Team Novak	+ 1' 42"
15	Attila Valter (HUN)	Pannon Cycling Team	+ 1' 52"
16	Jannik Steimle (GER)	Team Vorarlberg Santic	+ 2' 02"
17	El Mehdi Chokri (MAR)	Dimension Data for Qhubeka	+ 2' 11"
18	Adne van Engelen (NED)	Bike Aid	+ 2' 19"
19	Márton Dina (HUN)	Pannon Cycling Team	+ 2' 20"
20	Karel Hník (CZE)	Pardus–TUFO Prostějov	+ 2' 23"
21	Andi Bajc (SLO)	My Bike–Stevens	+ 2' 29"
22	Veljko Stojnić (SRB)	Serbia (national team)	+ 2' 37"
23	Patryk Stosz (POL)	CCC–Sprandi–Polkowice	+ 3' 21"
24	Stefano Oldani (ITA)	Polartec–Kometa	+ 3' 42"
25	Charles Planet (FRA)	Team Novo Nordisk	+ 4' 34"
26	Gian Friesecke (SUI)	Team Vorarlberg Santic	+ 4' 35"
27	Žiga Ručigaj (SLO)	Ljubljana Gusto Xaurum	+ 5' 17"
28	Mateusz Taciak (POL)	CCC–Sprandi–Polkowice	+ 5' 35"
29	Paweł Bernas (POL)	CCC–Sprandi–Polkowice	+ 6' 12"
30	Tom Vermeer (NED)	Differdange–Losch	+ 7' 30"
31	Tom Thill (LUX)	Differdange–Losch	+ 7' 38"
32	Matic Grošelj (SLO)	Ljubljana Gusto Xaurum	+ 8' 39"
33	Ádám Karl (HUN)	Hungary (national team)	+ 9' 08"
34	Albeto Marengo (ITA)	Kőbánya Cycling Team	+ 9' 09"
35	Juan Camacho (ESP)	Polartec–Kometa	+ 10' 31"
36	Benjamin Hill (AUS)	Ljubljana Gusto Xaurum	+ 11' 28"
37	Joeri Stallaert (BEL)	Team Vorarlberg Santic	+ 11' 33"
38	Roland Thalmann (SUI)	Team Vorarlberg Santic	+ 11' 50"
39	Matteo Draperi (ITA)	Sangemini–MG.K Vis Vega	+ 11' 56"
40	Denis Vulcan (ROU)	Romania (national team)	+ 12' 02"
41	Péter Simon (HUN)	Pannon Cycling Team	+ 12' 07"
42	Matteo Sobrero (ITA)	Dimension Data for Qhubeka	+ 12' 49"
43	Attilio Viviani (ITA)	Sangemini–MG.K Vis Vega	+ 13' 11"
44	Antonio Di Sante (ITA)	Sangemini–MG.K Vis Vega	+ 13' 21"
45	Andrea Peron (ITA)	Team Novo Nordisk	+ 14' 06"
46	Tilen Finkšt (SLO)	Ljubljana Gusto Xaurum	+ 14' 21"
47	Timothy Guy (AUS)	Ljubljana Gusto Xaurum	+ 14' 25"
48	András Szatmáry (HUN)	Pannon Cycling Team	+ 14' 32"
49	Jelle Donders (BEL)	Differdange–Losch	+ 14' 35"
50	Mykyta Zubenko (UKR)	Pardus–TUFO Prostějov	+ 14' 36"
51	Meron Abraham (ERI)	Bike Aid	+ 14' 41"
52	Karel Tyrpekl (CZE)	Pardus–TUFO Prostějov	+ 14' 44"
53	Aljaž Prah (SLO)	Ljubljana Gusto Xaurum	+ 14' 50"
54	Vlad-Nicolae Dobre (ROU)	Romania (national team)	+ 14' 52"
55	Davide Orrico (ITA)	Team Vorarlberg Santic	+ 14' 57"
56	Ján Andrej Cully (SVK)	Dukla Banská Bystrica	+ 16' 20"
57	Viktor Potočki (CRO)	Ljubljana Gusto Xaurum	+ 16' 56"
58	Balázs Rózsa (HUN)	Differdange–Losch	+ 17' 09"
59	Ahmed Galdoune (MAR)	Kőbánya Cycling Team	+ 17' 10"
60	Yegor Dementyev (UKR)	Team Novak	+ 17' 27"
61	János Pelikán (HUN)	My Bike–Stevens	+ 17' 28"
62	Louis Visser (RSA)	Dimension Data for Qhubeka	+ 17' 30"
63	Matteo Moschetti (ITA)	Polartec–Kometa	+ 17' 49"
64	Michele Scartezzini (ITA)	Sangemini–MG.K Vis Vega	+ 18' 07"
65	Sam Brand (GBR)	Team Novo Nordisk	+ 18' 22"
66	Luca Mozzato (ITA)	Dimension Data for Qhubeka	+ 18' 37"
67	Ollie Jones (NZL)	Dimension Data for Qhubeka	+ 18' 39"
68	Márton Solymosi (HUN)	Hungary (national team)	+ 19' 48"
69	Dániel Móricz (HUN)	Kőbánya Cycling Team	+ 19' 57"
70	Toni Franz (GER)	Differdange–Losch	+ 20' 03"
71	Stevan Klisurić (SRB)	Serbia (national team)	+ 20' 04"
72	Gergő Gönczy (HUN)	Hungary (national team)	+ 20' 17"
73	Lukas Meiler (GER)	Team Vorarlberg Santic	+ 20' 18"
74	Fabio Calabria (AUS)	Team Novo Nordisk	+ 20' 24"
75	Christopher Williams (AUS)	Team Novo Nordisk	+ 20' 49"
76	Umberto Poli (ITA)	Team Novo Nordisk	+ 21' 17"
77	Kevin Rivera (CRC)	Androni Giocattoli–Sidermec	+ 21' 47"
78	Lucas Carstensen (GER)	Bike Aid	+ 22' 16"
79	Dušan Kalaba (SRB)	Serbia (national team)	+ 22' 25"
80	Zoltán Vígh (HUN)	Hungary (national team)	+ 22' 28"
81	Daniel Crista (ROU)	Romania (national team)	+ 23' 31"
82	František Sisr (CZE)	CCC–Sprandi–Polkowice	+ 23' 46"
83	Marco Benfatto (ITA)	Androni Giocattoli–Sidermec	+ 24' 20"
84	Péter László (ROU)	Team Novak	+ 24' 54"
85	Gerd Fidler (AUT)	My Bike–Stevens	+ 25' 05"
86	Csaba Pályi (HUN)	Hungary (national team)	+ 25' 19"
87	Tiago da Silva (LUX)	Differdange–Losch	+ 25' 22"
88	Samuel Oros (SVK)	Dukla Banská Bystrica	+ 25' 46"
89	Martin Mahďar (SVK)	Dukla Banská Bystrica	+ 25' 52"
90	Stefan Mastaller (AUT)	My Bike–Stevens	+ 26' 01"
91	Daniel Bichlmann (GER)	Bike Aid	+ 26' 12"
92	Wojciech Pszczolarski (POL)	Pardus–TUFO Prostějov	+ 26' 40"
93	Martin Vlčák (SVK)	Dukla Banská Bystrica	+ 28' 24"
94	Mehdi Benhamouda (FRA)	Team Novo Nordisk	+ 28' 34"
95	Rostyslav Zhukovskyi (UKR)	Kőbánya Cycling Team	+ 30' 13"
96	Dušan Veselinović (SRB)	Serbia (national team)	+ 30' 41"
97	Juraj Bellan (SVK)	Dukla Banská Bystrica	+ 31' 07"
98	Samuele Oliveto (ITA)	Kőbánya Cycling Team	+ 31' 43"
99	Michele Gazzoli (ITA)	Polartec–Kometa	+ 32' 12"
100	Isaac Cantón (ESP)	Polartec–Kometa	+ 32' 23"
101	Raffaello Bonusi (ITA)	Androni Giocattoli–Sidermec	+ 36' 37"
102	Diego Pablo Sevilla (ESP)	Polartec–Kometa	+ 36' 40"
103	Federico Molini (ITA)	Dimension Data for Qhubeka	+ 36' 47"
104	Timo Schäfer (GER)	Bike Aid	+ 37' 17"
105	Tino Thömel (GER)	Bike Aid	+ 44' 57"

=== Points classification ===
Points classification (1–10)
Rank	Rider	Team	Points
1	Manuel Belletti (ITA)	Androni Giocattoli–Sidermec	29
2	Matteo Moschetti (ITA)	Polartec–Kometa	22
3	Nikodemus Holler (GER)	Bike Aid	20
4	Kamil Małecki (POL)	CCC–Sprandi–Polkowice	19
5	Jannik Steimle (GER)	Team Vorarlberg Santic	14
6	Paolo Totò (ITA)	Sangemini–MG.K Vis Vega	11
7	Attilio Viviani (ITA)	Sangemini–MG.K Vis Vega	8
8	Maximillian Kuen (AUT)	My Bike–Stevens	7
9	Marco Benfatto (ITA)	Androni Giocattoli–Sidermec	6
10	Isaac Canton (ESP)	Polartec–Kometa	6

=== Mountains classification ===
Mountains classification (1–10)
Rank	Rider	Team	Points
1	Patryk Stosz (POL)	CCC–Sprandi–Polkowice	26
2	Attila Valter (HUN)	Pannon Cycling Team	21
3	Isaac Cantón (ESP)	Polartec–Kometa	13
4	Nicolae Tanovițchii (MDA)	Team Novak	19
5	Adne van Engelen (NED)	Bike Aid	13
6	Márton Dina (HUN)	Pannon Cycling Team	10
7	Patrick Schelling (SUI)	Team Vorarlberg Santic	7
8	András Szatmáry (HUN)	Pannon Cycling Team	6
9	Adrian Kurek (POL)	CCC–Sprandi–Polkowice	5
10	Michelle Gazarra (ITA)	Sangemini–MG.K Vis Vega	5

=== Hungarian rider classification ===
Best Hungarian rider classification (1–10)
Rank	Rider	Team	Time
1	Attila Valter	Pannon Cycling Team	19h 22' 59"
2	Márton Dina	Pannon Cycling Team	+ 28"
3	Ádám Karl	Hungary (national team)	+ 7' 16"
4	Péter Simon	Pannon Cycling Team	+ 10' 15"
5	András Szatmáry	Pannon Cycling Team	+ 12' 40"
6	Balázs Rózsa	Differdange–Losch	+ 15' 17"
7	János Pelikán	My Bike–Stevens	+ 15' 36"
8	Márton Solymosi	Hungary (national team)	+ 17' 56"
9	Dániel Móricz	Kőbánya Cycling Team	+ 18' 05"
10	Gergő Gönczy	Hungary (national team)	+ 18' 25"

=== Team classification ===
Team classification (1–10)
Rank	Team	Time
1	CCC–Sprandi–Polkowice	49h 45' 01"
2	Sangemini–MG.K Vis Vega	+ 24"
3	Androni Giocattoli–Sidermec	+ 43"
4	Team Vorarlberg Santic	+ 5' 08"
5	Team Novak	+ 11' 02"
6	Pannon Cycling Team	+ 13' 27"
7	Bike Aid	+ 14' 31"
8	Polartec–Kometa	+ 14' 40"
9	My Bike–Stevens	+ 16' 27"
10	Ljubljana Gusto Xaurum	+ 20' 15"

== See also ==
- 2018 in men's road cycling
- 2018 in sports
