= 2019 Tour de Hongrie =

2019 UCI Europe Tour
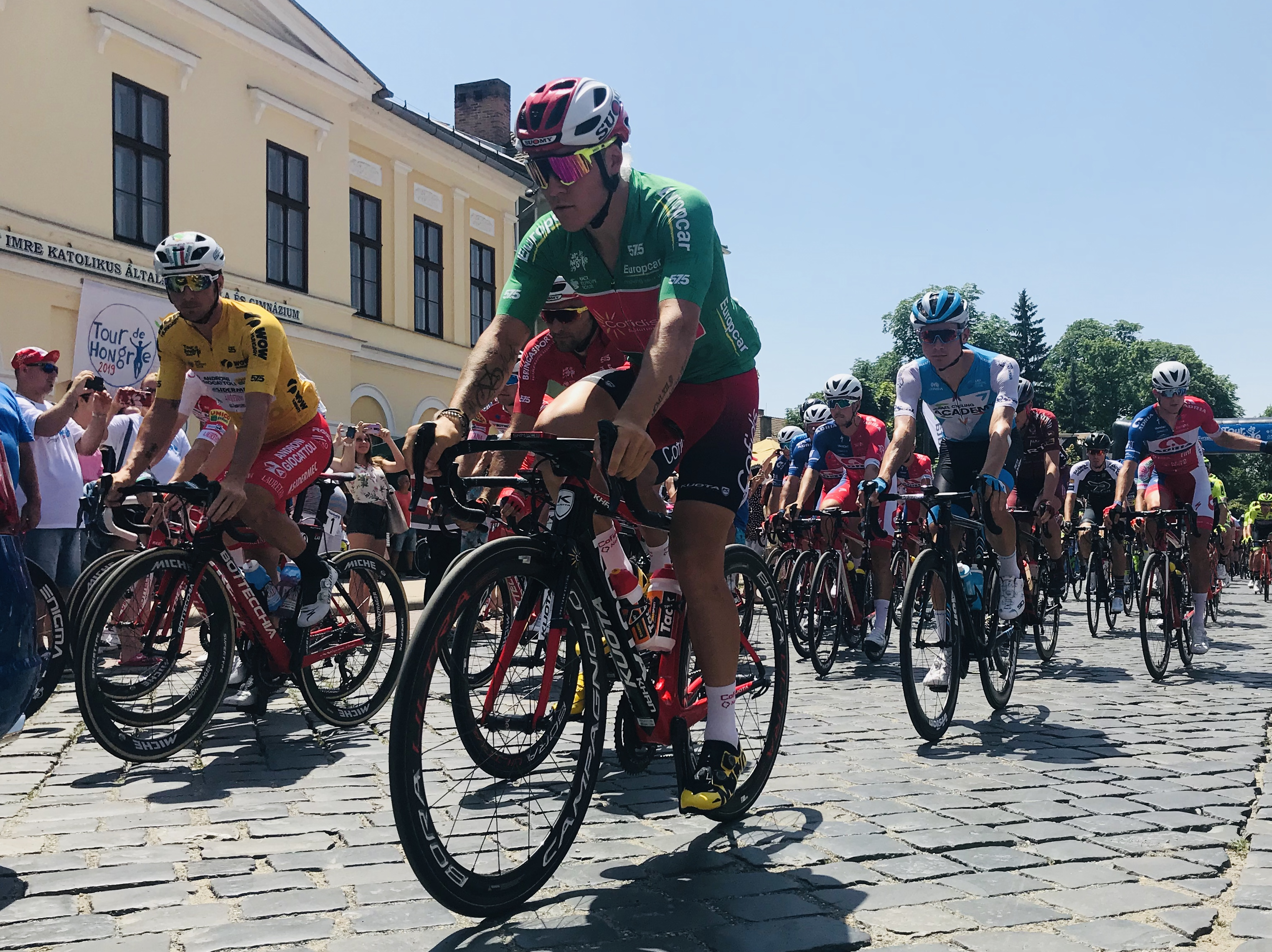
- Stage 2 at Balassagyarmat

Race details
- Dates: 11–16 June
- Stages: 5 + Prologue
- Distance: 890 km (553.0 mi)
- Winning time: 21h 13' 00"

Results
Jersey awarded to the overall winner	Winner	Krists Neilands (LAT)	(Israel Cycling Academy)
	Second	Márton Dina (HUN)	(Kometa Cycling Team)
	Third	Attila Valter (HUN)	(CCC Development Team)
Jersey awarded to the points classification winner	Points	Manuel Belletti (ITA)	(Androni Giocattoli–Sidermec)
Jersey awarded to the mountains classification winner	Mountains	Krists Neilands (LAT)	(Israel Cycling Academy)
	Team	CCC Development Team	

The 2019 Tour de Hongrie was the 40th edition of the Tour de Hongrie, between 11 and 16 June 2019. It was the fifth edition of the revival in 2015, and was rated as a 2.1 event as part of the 2019 UCI Europe Tour. The race was won by Krists Neilands (Israel–Premier Tech), who became the first Latvian rider to win the Tour de Hongrie. Two Hungarian rider got up on the podium, Márton Dina (Kometa Cycling Team) finished 2nd, Attila Valter (CCC Development Team) in 3rd place.

== Route ==
Stages of the 2019 Tour de Hongrie
Stage	Date	Route	Distance	Type	Winner
P	11 June	Siófok	4 km (2.5 mi)	Individual time trial	Jan Bárta (CZE)
1	12 June	Velence to Esztergom	194 km (120.5 mi)	Hilly stage	Manuel Belletti (ITA)
2	13 June	Balassagyarmat to Miskolc	201 km (124.9 mi)	Intermediate stage	Krists Neilands (LAT)
3/a	14 June	Kazincbarcika to Tiszafüred	115 km (71.5 mi)	Hilly stage	Krisztián Lovassy (HUN)
3/b	14 June	Tiszafüred to Hajdúszoboszló	69 km (42.9 mi)	Plain stage	Alois Kaňkovský (CZE)
4	15 June	Karcag to Gyöngyös (Kékestető)	138 km (85.7 mi)	Intermediate stage	Krists Neilands (LAT)
5	16 June	Kecskemét to Székesfehérvár	169 km (105.0 mi)	Plain stage	Wouter Wippert (NED)
Total			890 km (553 mi)		

== Teams ==
Nineteen teams were invited to start the race. These included four UCI Professional Continentals, thirteen UCI Continental teams and two national teams.

UCI Professional Continental teams

- Androni Giocattoli–Sidermec
- Cofidis
- Israel Cycling Academy
- Neri Sottoli–Selle Italia–KTM

UCI Continental teams

- Kometa Cycling Team
- Pannon Cycling Team
- Adria Mobil
- Team Novak
- CCC Development Team
- Elkov–Author
- Team Coop
- AC Sparta Praha
- Bike Aid
- EvoPro Racing
- Dukla Banská Bystrica
- Team BridgeLane
- Team Differdange–Geba

National team

- Hungary
- Serbia

== Stages ==
=== Prologue ===
11 June 2019 — Siófok, 4 km (2 mi)

Result and General Classification after the Prologue
Rank	Rider	Team	Time
1	Jan Bárta (CZE)	Elkov–Author	4' 17"
2	Krists Neilands (LAT)	Israel Cycling Academy	s.t.
3	Piotr Brożyna (POL)	CCC Development Team	+ 2"
4	August Jensen (NOR)	Israel Cycling Academy	+ 2"
5	Dušan Rajović (SRB)	Adria Mobil	+ 2"

=== Stage 1 ===
12 June 2019 — Velence to Esztergom, 194.1 km (121 mi)

Result of Stage 1
Rank	Rider	Team	Time
1	Manuel Belletti (ITA)	Androni Giocattoli–Sidermec	4h 38' 55"
2	Hugo Hofstetter (FRA)	Cofidis	s.t.
3	Dušan Rajović (SRB)	Adria Mobil	s.t.
4	Louis Bendixen (DEN)	Team Coop	s.t.
5	Umberto Marengo (ITA)	Neri Sottoli–Selle Italia–KTM	s.t.

General classification after Stage 1
Rank	Rider	Team	Time
1	Manuel Belletti (ITA)	Androni Giocattoli–Sidermec	4h 43' 07"
2	Krists Neilands (LAT)	Israel Cycling Academy	+ 3"
3	Dušan Rajović (SRB)	Adria Mobil	+ 3"
4	Jan Bárta (CZE)	Elkov–Author	+ 5"
5	Piotr Brożyna (POL)	CCC Development Team	+ 7"

=== Stage 2 ===
13 June 2019 — Balassagyarmat to Miskolc, 200.6 km (125 mi)

Result of Stage 2
Rank	Rider	Team	Time
1	Krists Neilands (LAT)	Israel Cycling Academy	5h 10' 14"
2	Louis Bendixen (DEN)	Team Coop	+ 1' 00"
3	Marco Frapporti (ITA)	Androni Giocattoli–Sidermec	+ 1' 00"
4	Matej Zahálka (CZE)	Elkov–Author	+ 1' 00"
5	Mathias Le Turnier (FRA)	Cofidis	+ 1' 00"

General classification after Stage 2
Rank	Rider	Team	Time
1	Krists Neilands (LAT)	Israel Cycling Academy	9h 53' 14"
2	Manuel Belletti (ITA)	Androni Giocattoli–Sidermec	+ 1' 07"
3	Louis Bendixen (DEN)	Team Coop	+ 1' 10"
4	Jan Bárta (CZE)	Elkov–Author	+ 1' 12"
5	Piotr Brożyna (POL)	CCC Development Team	+ 1' 14"

=== Stage 3/a ===
14 June 2019 — Kazincbarcika to Tiszafüred, 115.2 km (72 mi)

Result of Stage 3a
Rank	Rider	Team	Time
1	Krisztián Lovassy (HUN)	Hungary (national team)	2h 33' 21"
2	Stanisław Aniołkowski (POL)	CCC Development Team	s.t.
3	Gašper Katrašnik (SLO)	Adria Mobil	s.t.
4	Jakub Otruba (CZE)	Elkov–Author	s.t.
5	Filippo Fortin (ITA)	Cofidis	+ 4' 04"

General classification after Stage 3a
Rank	Rider	Team	Time
1	Krists Neilands (LAT)	Israel Cycling Academy	12h 30' 39"
2	Manuel Belletti (ITA)	Androni Giocattoli–Sidermec	+ 1' 07"
3	Louis Bendixen (DEN)	Team Coop	+ 1' 10"
4	Jan Bárta (CZE)	Elkov–Author	+ 1' 12"
5	Piotr Brożyna (POL)	CCC Development Team	+ 1' 14"

=== Stage 3/b ===
14 June 2019 — Tiszafüred to Hajdúszoboszló, 69.8 km (43 mi)

Result of Stage 3b
Rank	Rider	Team	Time
1	Alois Kaňkovský (CZE)	Elkov–Author	1h 28' 04"
2	Wouter Wippert (NED)	EvoPro Racing	s.t.
3	Manuel Belletti (ITA)	Androni Giocattoli–Sidermec	s.t.
4	Trond Trondsen (NOR)	Team Coop	s.t.
5	Filippo Fortin (ITA)	Cofidis	s.t.

General classification after Stage 3b
Rank	Rider	Team	Time
1	Krists Neilands (LAT)	Israel Cycling Academy	13h 58' 43"
2	Manuel Belletti (ITA)	Androni Giocattoli–Sidermec	+ 1' 05"
3	Louis Bendixen (DEN)	Team Coop	+ 1' 10"
4	Jan Bárta (CZE)	Elkov–Author	+ 1' 12"
5	Piotr Brożyna (POL)	CCC Development Team	+ 1' 14"

=== Stage 4 ===
15 June 2019 — Karcag to Gyöngyös (Kékestető), 138.1 km (86 mi)

Result of Stage 2
Rank	Rider	Team	Time
1	Krists Neilands (LAT)	Israel Cycling Academy	3h 20' 40"
2	Márton Dina (HUN)	Kometa Cycling Team	s.t.
3	Attila Valter (HUN)	CCC Development Team	s.t.
4	Edoardo Zardini (ITA)	Neri Sottoli–Selle Italia–KTM	+ 13"
5	Juan Pedro López (ESP)	Kometa Cycling Team	+ 24"

General classification after Stage 4
Rank	Rider	Team	Time
1	Krists Neilands (LAT)	Israel Cycling Academy	17h 19' 13"
2	Márton Dina (HUN)	Kometa Cycling Team	+ 1' 22"
3	Attila Valter (HUN)	CCC Development Team	+ 1' 26"
4	Edoardo Zardini (ITA)	Neri Sottoli–Selle Italia–KTM	+ 1' 45"
5	Juan Pedro López (ESP)	Kometa Cycling Team	+ 1' 53"

=== Stage 5 ===
16 June 2019 — Kecskemét to Székesfehérvár, 168.3 km (105 mi)

Result of Stage 5
Rank	Rider	Team	Time
1	Wouter Wippert (NED)	EvoPro Racing	3h 53' 47"
2	Hugo Hofstetter (FRA)	Cofidis	s.t.
3	Mihkel Räim (EST)	Israel Cycling Academy	s.t.
4	Manuel Belletti (ITA)	Androni Giocattoli–Sidermec	s.t.
5	Trond Trondsen (NOR)	Team Coop	s.t.

Final general classification
Rank	Rider	Team	Time
1	Krists Neilands (LAT)	Israel Cycling Academy	21h 13' 00"
2	Márton Dina (HUN)	Kometa Cycling Team	+ 1' 22"
3	Attila Valter (HUN)	CCC Development Team	+ 1' 26"
4	Edoardo Zardini (ITA)	Neri Sottoli–Selle Italia–KTM	+ 1' 45"
5	Giovanni Visconti (ITA)	Neri Sottoli–Selle Italia–KTM	+ 1' 58"

== Classification leadership table ==
In the 2019 Tour de Hongrie, four jerseys were awarded. The general classification was calculated by adding each cyclist's finishing times on each stage. The leader of the general classification received a yellow jersey sponsored by brand of Hungarian Tourism Agency (WOW Hungary). This classification was considered the most important of the 2019 Tour de Hongrie, and the winner of the classification was considered the winner of the race.

Points for the points classification
Type	1	2	3	4	5	6	7	8	9	10	11	12	13	14	15
Stage finishes	30	26	24	22	20	18	16	14	12	10	8	6	4	2	1
Intermediate sprint	3	2	1	0											
Special sprint	3	2	1	0											

The second classification was the points classification. Riders were awarded points for finishing in the top fifteen in a stage. Points were also won in intermediate sprints. The leader of the points classification was awarded a green jersey sponsored by Europcar.

Points for the mountains classification
Type	1	2	3	4	5	6	7
Points for Category	15	12	9	6	4	2	1
Points for Category	6	4	2	0			
Points for Category	3	2	1	0			

There was also a mountains classification for which points were awarded for reaching the top of a climb before other riders. The climbs were categorized, in order of increasing difficulty, as third, second and first-category. The leadership of the mountains classification was marked by a red jersey with red sponsored by Hungarian Cycling Federation (Bringasport).

The fourth jersey was a classification for Hungarian riders, marked by a white jersey sponsored by Cofidis. Only Hungarian riders were eligible and they were awarded according to their placement in the general classification of the race.

The final classification was the team classification, in which the times of the best three cyclists in a team on each stage were added together; the leading team at the end of the race was the team with the lowest cumulative time.

Classification leadership by stage
Stage	Winner	General classification	Points classification	Mountains classification	Best Hungarian rider	Team classification
P	Jan Bárta	Jan Bárta	not awarded	not awarded	Márton Dina	Israel Cycling Academy
1	Manuel Belletti	Manuel Belletti	Manuel Belletti	Luis Ángel Maté	Márton Dina	Israel Cycling Academy
2	Krists Neilands	Krists Neilands	Louis Bendixen	Krists Neilands	Márton Dina	Kometa Cycling Team
3a	Krisztián Lovassy	Krists Neilands	Louis Bendixen	Krists Neilands	Márton Dina	CCC Development Team
3b	Alois Kaňkovský	Krists Neilands	Louis Bendixen	Krists Neilands	Erik Fetter	CCC Development Team
4	Krists Neilands	Krists Neilands	Krists Neilands	Krists Neilands	Márton Dina	CCC Development Team
5	Wouter Wippert	Krists Neilands	Manuel Belletti	Krists Neilands	Márton Dina	CCC Development Team
Final		Krists Neilands	Manuel Belletti	Krists Neilands	Márton Dina	CCC Development Team

== Standings ==
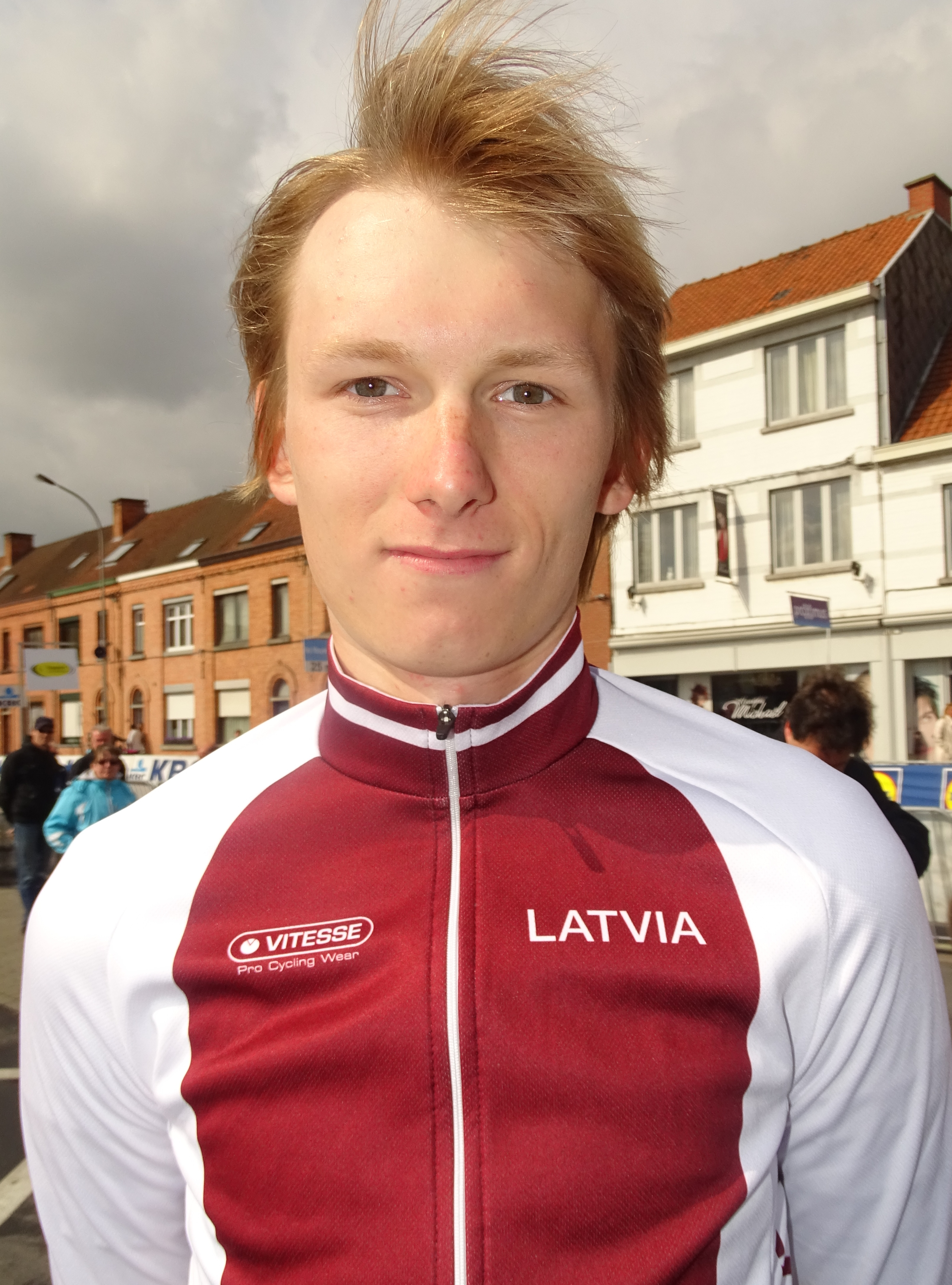
The race winner: Krists Neilands (pictured in 2015)

Legend
Yellow jersey	Denotes the leader of the general classification	Green jersey	Denotes the leader of the points classification
Red jersey	Denotes the leader of the mountains classification	White jersey	Denotes the leader of the best Hungarian rider classification

=== General classification ===
General classification (1–10)
Rank	Rider	Team	Time
1	Krists Neilands (LAT)	Israel Cycling Academy	21h 13' 00"
2	Márton Dina (HUN)	Kometa Cycling Team	+ 1' 22"
3	Attila Valter (HUN)	CCC Development Team	+ 1' 26"
4	Edoardo Zardini (ITA)	Neri Sottoli–Selle Italia–KTM	+ 1' 45"
5	Giovanni Visconti (ITA)	Neri Sottoli–Selle Italia–KTM	+ 1' 58"
6	Juan Pedro López (ESP)	Kometa Cycling Team	+ 2' 04"
7	Stefano Oldani (ITA)	Kometa Cycling Team	+ 2' 08"
8	Daniel Muñoz (COL)	Androni Giocattoli–Sidermec	+ 2' 16"
9	Karel Hník (CZE)	Elkov–Author	+ 2' 24"
10	Mathias Le Turnier (FRA)	Cofidis	+ 2' 24"

Final general classification (11–107)
Rank	Rider	Team	Time
11	Jan Bárta (CZE)	Elkov–Author	+ 2' 36"
12	Kristian Aasvold (NOR)	Team Coop	+ 2' 41"
13	Michał Paluta (POL)	CCC Development Team	+ 2' 51"
14	Piotr Brożyna (POL)	CCC Development Team	+ 2' 52"
15	Alessandro Bisolti (ITA)	Androni Giocattoli–Sidermec	+ 2' 57"
16	Simone Velasco (ITA)	Neri Sottoli–Selle Italia–KTM	+ 2' 59"
17	Erik Fetter (HUN)	Pannon Cycling Team	+ 3' 02"
18	Louis Bendixen (DEN)	Team Coop	+ 3' 09"
19	Hayden McCormick (NZL)	Team BridgeLane	+ 3' 14"
20	Lionel Mawditt (AUS)	Team BridgeLane	+ 3' 15"
21	Dominik Neumann (CZE)	Elkov–Author	+ 3' 46"
22	August Jensen (NOR)	Team Coop	+ 3' 47"
23	Umberto Marengo (ITA)	Neri Sottoli–Selle Italia–KTM	+ 4' 22"
24	Luis Ángel Maté (ESP)	Cofidis	+ 4' 23"
25	Martin Haring (SVK)	Dukla Banská Bystrica	+ 5' 23"
26	Viktor Filutás (HUN)	Pannon Cycling Team	+ 5' 27"
27	Jeroen Pattyn (BEL)	Team Differdange–Geba	+ 6' 40"
28	Francesco Gavazzi (ITA)	Androni Giocattoli–Sidermec	+ 7' 27"
29	Josip Rumac (CRO)	Androni Giocattoli–Sidermec	+ 7' 36"
30	Marco Frapporti (ITA)	Androni Giocattoli–Sidermec	+ 7' 53"
31	Adne van Engelen (NED)	Bike Aid	+ 8' 56"
32	Albert Muela (ESP)	EvoPro Racing	+ 9' 25"
33	Diego Pablo Sevilla (ESP)	Kometa Cycling Team	+ 9' 55"
34	Mekseb Debesay (ERI)	Bike Aid	+ 10' 04"
35	Francesco Manuel Bongiorno (ITA)	Neri Sottoli–Selle Italia–KTM	+ 10' 28"
36	Jaime Restrepo (COL)	Team Novak	+ 11' 13"
37	Manuel Belletti (ITA)	Androni Giocattoli–Sidermec	+ 12' 08"
38	András Szatmáry (HUN)	Pannon Cycling Team	+ 13' 24"
39	Tom Thill (LUX)	Team Differdange–Geba	+ 18' 20"
40	František Sisr (CZE)	Elkov–Author	+ 19' 27"
41	Yegor Dementyev (UKR)	Team Novak	+ 20' 10"
42	Scott Bowden (AUS)	Team BridgeLane	+ 20' 28"
43	Jacob Ericksson (SWE)	Team Coop	+ 20' 37"
44	Stanisław Aniołkowski (POL)	CCC Development Team	+ 21' 16"
45	Harry Sweeny (AUS)	EvoPro Racing	+ 22' 17"
46	Thomas Deruette (BEL)	Team Differdange–Geba	+ 23' 34"
47	Tomáš Kalojíros (CZE)	AC Sparta Praha	+ 24' 29"
48	Dušan Rajović (SRB)	Adria Mobil	+ 24' 32"
49	Hugo Hofstetter (FRA)	Cofidis	+ 24' 38"
50	Aaron Grosser (GER)	Bike Aid	+ 25' 33"
51	Mihkel Räim (EST)	Israel Cycling Academy	+ 25' 48"
52	Roberto González (PAN)	Neri Sottoli–Selle Italia–KTM	+ 26' 16"
53	Ján Andrej Cully (SVK)	Dukla Banská Bystrica	+ 26' 41"
54	Jakub Otruba (CZE)	Elkov–Author	+ 26' 57"
55	Filippo Fortin (ITA)	Cofidis	+ 27' 01"
56	Zak Dempster (AUS)	Israel Cycling Academy	+ 27' 49"
57	Victor Lafay (FRA)	Cofidis	+ 27' 50"
58	Đorđe Đurić (SRB)	Serbia (national team)	+ 27' 51"
59	Lorenzo Fortunato (ITA)	Neri Sottoli–Selle Italia–KTM	+ 28' 02"
60	Patrik Tybor (SVK)	Dukla Banská Bystrica	+ 28' 20"
61	Ádám Karl (HUN)	Hungary (national team)	+ 29' 38"
62	Ayden Toovey (AUS)	Team BridgeLane	+ 29' 43"
63	Antonio Puppio (ITA)	Kometa Cycling Team	+ 30' 14"
64	Michele Gazzoli (ITA)	Kometa Cycling Team	+ 30' 16"
65	Gorazd Per (SLO)	Adria Mobil	+ 31' 12"
66	Nick White (AUS)	Team BridgeLane	+ 31' 13"
67	Gabriel Muller (FRA)	Team Differdange–Geba	+ 31' 39"
68	Michal Schuran (CZE)	AC Sparta Praha	+ 33' 38"
69	Marek Čanecký (SVK)	Dukla Banská Bystrica	+ 33' 51"
70	Daniel Arroyave (COL)	Team Novak	+ 34' 35"
71	Daire Feeley (IRL)	EvoPro Racing	+ 34' 39"
72	Andrej Galović (SRB)	Serbia (national team)	+ 36' 18"
73	Matej Zahálka (CZE)	Elkov–Author	+ 37' 03"
74	Jon Božič (SLO)	Adria Mobil	+ 37' 18"
75	Matteo Spreafico (ITA)	Androni Giocattoli–Sidermec	+ 37' 19"
76	Trond Trondsen (NOR)	Team Coop	+ 38' 48"
77	Erik Lunder (NOR)	Team Coop	+ 39' 07"
78	Tomáš Schühler (CZE)	AC Sparta Praha	+ 39' 13"
79	Wilmar Molina (COL)	Team Novak	+ 40' 08"
80	Jan Stöhr (CZE)	AC Sparta Praha	+ 40' 35"
81	Guy Sagiv (ISR)	Israel Cycling Academy	+ 41' 17"
82	Omer Goldstein (ISR)	Israel Cycling Academy	+ 41' 33"
83	Dániel Dina (HUN)	Pannon Cycling Team	+ 41' 57"
84	Toni Franz (GER)	Team Differdange–Geba	+ 42' 17"
85	Lucas Carstensen (GER)	Bike Aid	+ 43' 04"
86	Juraj Bellan (SVK)	Dukla Banská Bystrica	+ 43' 26"
87	Krisztián Lovassy (HUN)	Hungary (national team)	+ 43' 44"
88	Dániel Móricz (HUN)	Pannon Cycling Team	+ 43' 47"
89	Balázs Rózsa (HUN)	Team Differdange–Geba	+ 43' 57"
90	Peter Koning (NED)	EvoPro Racing	+ 45' 00"
91	Miklós Szabó (SVK)	Pannon Cycling Team	+ 47' 16"
92	Marko Danilović (SRB)	Serbia (national team)	+ 48' 53"
93	Ferenc Szöllősi (HUN)	Hungary (national team)	+ 50' 00"
94	Wouter Wippert (NED)	EvoPro Racing	+ 50' 03"
95	Damian Papierski (POL)	CCC Development Team	+ 51' 00"
96	Gergő Orosz (HUN)	Pannon Cycling Team	+ 51' 13"
97	Daniel Viegas (POR)	Kometa Cycling Team	+ 51' 21"
98	Petr Malán (CZE)	AC Sparta Praha	+ 51' 41"
99	Luke Mudgway (NZL)	EvoPro Racing	+ 53' 03"
100	Cyrus Monk (AUS)	EvoPro Racing	+ 53' 45"
101	Stefan Stefanović (SRB)	Serbia (national team)	+ 54' 44"
102	Ádám Pápai (HUN)	Hungary (national team)	+ 57' 19"
103	Daniel Bichlmann (GER)	Bike Aid	+ 1h 00' 06"
104	Karol Wawrzyniak (POL)	CCC Development Team	+ 1h 03' 14"
105	Balázs Vas (HUN)	Hungary (national team)	+ 1h 03' 42"
106	Dušan Veselinović (SRB)	Serbia (national team)	+ 1h 04' 53"
107	Carol-Eduard Novak (ROU)	Team Novak	+ 1h 05' 22"

=== Points classification ===
Points classification (1–10)
Rank	Rider	Team	Points
1	Manuel Belletti (ITA)	Androni Giocattoli–Sidermec	80
2	Krists Neilands (LAT)	Israel Cycling Academy	69
3	Louis Bendixen (DEN)	Team Coop	66
4	Hugo Hofstetter (FRA)	Cofidis	66
5	Wouter Wippert (NED)	EvoPro Racing	56
6	Trond Trondsen (NOR)	Team Coop	54
7	Attila Valter (HUN)	CCC Development Team	52
8	Aaron Grosser (GER)	Bike Aid	52
9	Stefano Oldani (ITA)	Kometa Cycling Team	46
10	Márton Dina (HUN)	Kometa Cycling Team	44

=== Mountains classification ===
Mountains classification (1–10)
Rank	Rider	Team	Points
1	Krists Neilands (LAT)	Israel Cycling Academy	32
2	Márton Dina (HUN)	Kometa Cycling Team	18
3	Juan Pedro López (ESP)	Kometa Cycling Team	16
4	Jon Božič (SLO)	Adria Mobil	15
5	Luis Ángel Maté (ESP)	Cofidis	15
6	Attila Valter (HUN)	CCC Development Team	9
7	Bálazs Rózsa (HUN)	Team Differdange–Geba	7
8	Jan Bárta (CZE)	Elkov–Author	6
9	Edoardo Zardini (ITA)	Neri Sottoli–Selle Italia–KTM	6
10	Matej Zahálka (CZE)	Elkov–Author	6

=== Hungarian rider classification ===
Best Hungarian rider classification (1–10)
Rank	Rider	Team	Time
1	Márton Dina	Kometa Cycling Team	21h 14' 22"
2	Attila Valter	CCC Development Team	+ 4"
3	Erik Fetter	Pannon Cycling Team	+ 1' 40"
4	Viktor Filutás	Pannon Cycling Team	+ 4' 05"
5	András Szatmáry	Pannon Cycling Team	+ 12' 02"
6	Ádám Karl	Hungary (national team)	+ 28' 16"
7	Dániel Dina	Pannon Cycling Team	+ 40' 35"
8	Krisztián Lovassy	Hungary (national team)	+ 42' 22"
9	Dániel Móricz	Pannon Cycling Team	+ 42' 25"
10	Balázs Rózsa	Team Differdange–Geba	+ 42' 35"

=== Team classification ===
Team classification (1–10)
Rank	Team	Time
1	CCC Development Team	63h 42' 16"
2	Elkov–Author	+ 1' 21"
3	Kometa Cycling Team	+ 2' 08"
4	Neri Sottoli–Selle Italia–KTM	+ 3' 16"
5	Androni Giocattoli–Sidermec	+ 8' 41"
6	Team Coop	+ 14' 16"
7	Pannon Cycling Team	+ 18' 15"
8	Team BridgeLane	+ 18' 34"
9	Israel Cycling Academy	+ 21' 50"
10	Cofidis	+ 27' 25"

== See also ==
- 2019 in men's road cycling
- 2019 in sports
