= 2022 Movistar Team (men's team) season =

Cycling team season

Movistar Team
- 2022 season
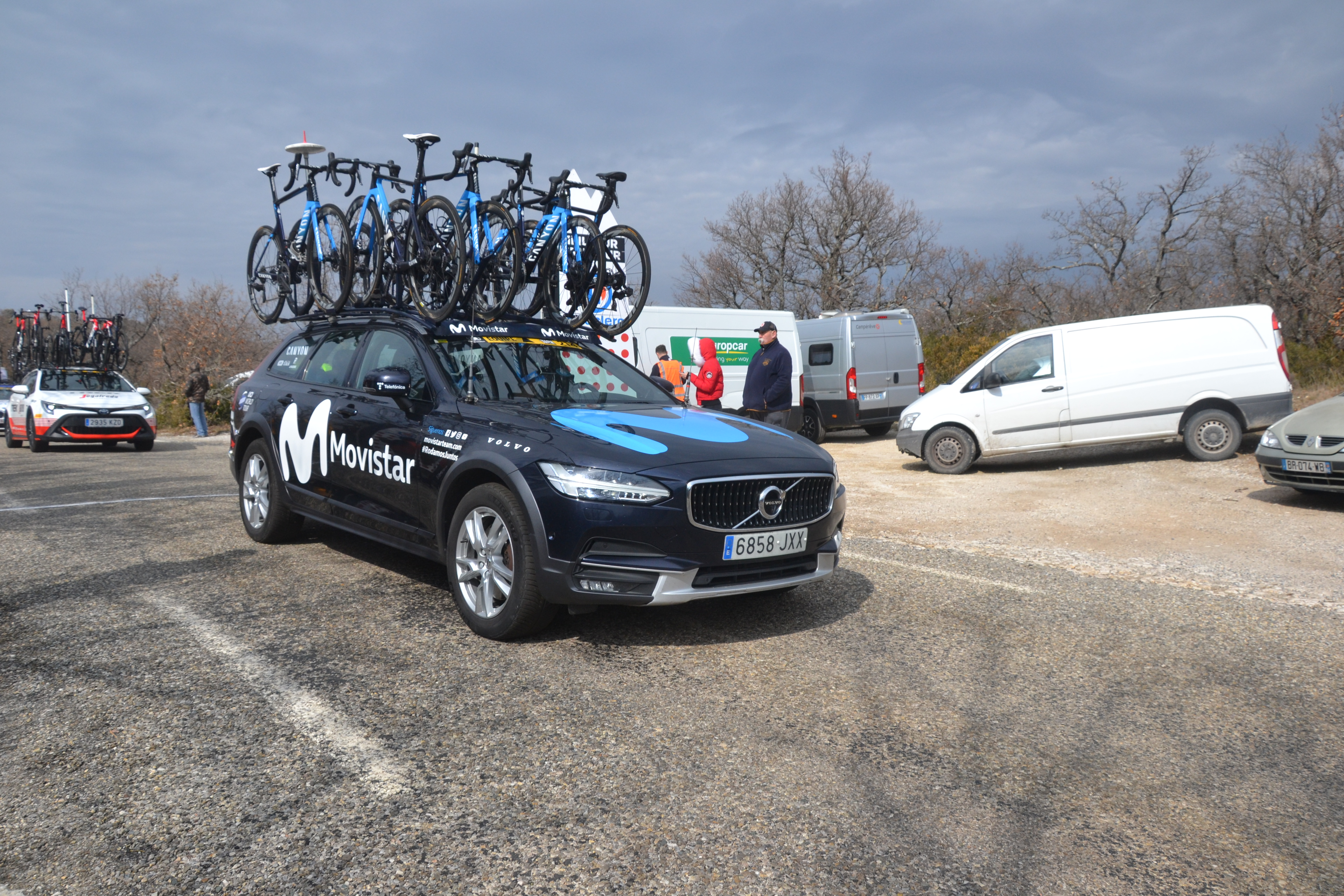
- A Movistar support car at Paris–Nice
- UCI code: MOV
- Status: UCI WorldTeam
- Manager: Eusebio Unzué (ESP)
- Main sponsor(s): Telefónica
- Based: Spain
- Bicycles: Canyon
- Groupset: SRAM

Season victories
- One-day races: 1
- Stage race overall: 2
- Stage race stages: 2
- Jersey

The 2022 season for Movistar Team is the 43rd season in the team's existence and the 12th season under the current name. The team has been a UCI WorldTeam since 2005, when the tier was first established. They use Canyon bicycles, SRAM drivetrain, Zipp wheels and Alé clothing.

== Team roster ==
As of 20 January 2022.

Rider	Date of birth
Alex Aranburu (ESP)	19 September 1995 (aged 26)
Jorge Arcas (ESP)	8 July 1992 (aged 29)
Will Barta (USA)	4 January 1996 (aged 25)
Iñigo Elosegui (ESP)	6 March 1998 (aged 23)
Imanol Erviti (ESP)	15 November 1983 (aged 38)
Iván García Cortina (ESP)	20 November 1995 (aged 26)
Abner González (PUR)	9 October 2000 (aged 21)
Juri Hollmann (GER)	30 August 1999 (aged 22)
Gorka Izagirre (ESP)	7 October 1987 (aged 34)
Johan Jacobs (SUI)	1 March 1997 (aged 24)
Matteo Jorgenson (USA)	1 July 1999 (aged 22)
Max Kanter (GER)	22 October 1997 (aged 24)
Oier Lazkano (ESP)	7 November 1999 (aged 22)
Enric Mas (ESP)	7 January 1995 (aged 26)
Lluís Mas (ESP)	15 October 1989 (aged 32)

Rider	Date of birth
Gregor Mühlberger (AUT)	4 April 1994 (aged 27)
Mathias Norsgaard (DEN)	5 May 1997 (aged 24)
Nelson Oliveira (POR)	6 March 1989 (aged 32)
Antonio Pedrero (ESP)	23 October 1991 (aged 30)
Vinícius Rangel (BRA)	26 May 2001 (aged 20)
Óscar Rodríguez (ESP)	6 May 1995 (aged 26)
José Joaquín Rojas (ESP)	8 June 1985 (aged 36)
Einer Rubio (COL)	22 February 1998 (aged 23)
Sergio Samitier (ESP)	31 August 1995 (aged 26)
Gonzalo Serrano (ESP)	17 August 1994 (aged 27)
Iván Sosa (COL)	31 October 1997 (aged 24)
Albert Torres (ESP)	26 April 1990 (aged 31)
Alejandro Valverde (ESP)	25 April 1980 (aged 41)
Carlos Verona (ESP)	4 November 1992 (aged 29)

Riders who joined the team for the 2022 season

Rider	2021 team
Alex Aranburu	Astana–Premier Tech
Will Barta	EF Education–Nippo
Gorka Izagirre	Astana–Premier Tech
Max Kanter	Team DSM
Oier Lazkano	Caja Rural–Seguros RGA
Vinícius Rangel	neo-pro (Telcom–On Clima–Osés Const)
Óscar Rodríguez	Astana–Premier Tech
Iván Sosa	INEOS Grenadiers

Riders who left the team during or after the 2021 season

Rider	2022 team
Juan Diego Alba	Drone Hopper–Androni Giocattoli
Héctor Carretero	Equipo Kern Pharma
Dario Cataldo	Trek–Segafredo
Gabriel Cullaigh	Saint Piran
Miguel Ángel López	Astana Qazaqstan Team
Sebastián Mora	Manuela Fundación
Marc Soler	UAE Team Emirates
Davide Villella	Cofidis

== Season victories ==
Date	Race	Competition	Rider	Country	Location	Ref.
29 January	Trofeo Pollença - Port d'Andratx	UCI Europe Tour	Alejandro Valverde (ESP)	Spain	Andratx	
26 February	O Gran Camiño, Stage 3	UCI Europe Tour	Alejandro Valverde (ESP)	Spain	Luintra	
27 February	O Gran Camiño, Overall	UCI Europe Tour	Alejandro Valverde (ESP)	Spain		
27 February	O Gran Camiño, Points classification	UCI Europe Tour	Alejandro Valverde (ESP)	Spain		
27 February	O Gran Camiño, Mountains classification	UCI Europe Tour	Iván Sosa (COL)	Spain		
27 February	O Gran Camiño, Team classification	UCI Europe Tour	(Note: The riders in the squad were Jorge Arcas, Gorka Izagirre, Nelson Oliveira, José Joaquín Rojas, Gonzalo Serrano, Iván Sosa, and Alejandro Valverde.)	Spain		
30 April	Vuelta Asturias, Stage 2	UCI Europe Tour	Iván Sosa (COL)	Spain	Cangas del Narcea	
1 May	Vuelta Asturias, Overall	UCI Europe Tour	Iván Sosa (COL)	Spain		

== National, Continental, and World Champions ==
Date	Discipline	Jersey	Rider	Country	Location	Ref.
