= EZK =

EZK may refer to:

- EZK, abbreviation of Ministerie van Economische Zaken en Klimaat, Dutch name for the Ministry of Economic Affairs and Climate Policy
- EZK Racing, cycling team of Gian Friesecke
- EZK, type of ignition used by the S/S2 model of the Porsche 928
