= Andrii Bratashchuk =

Ukrainian cyclist (born 1992)

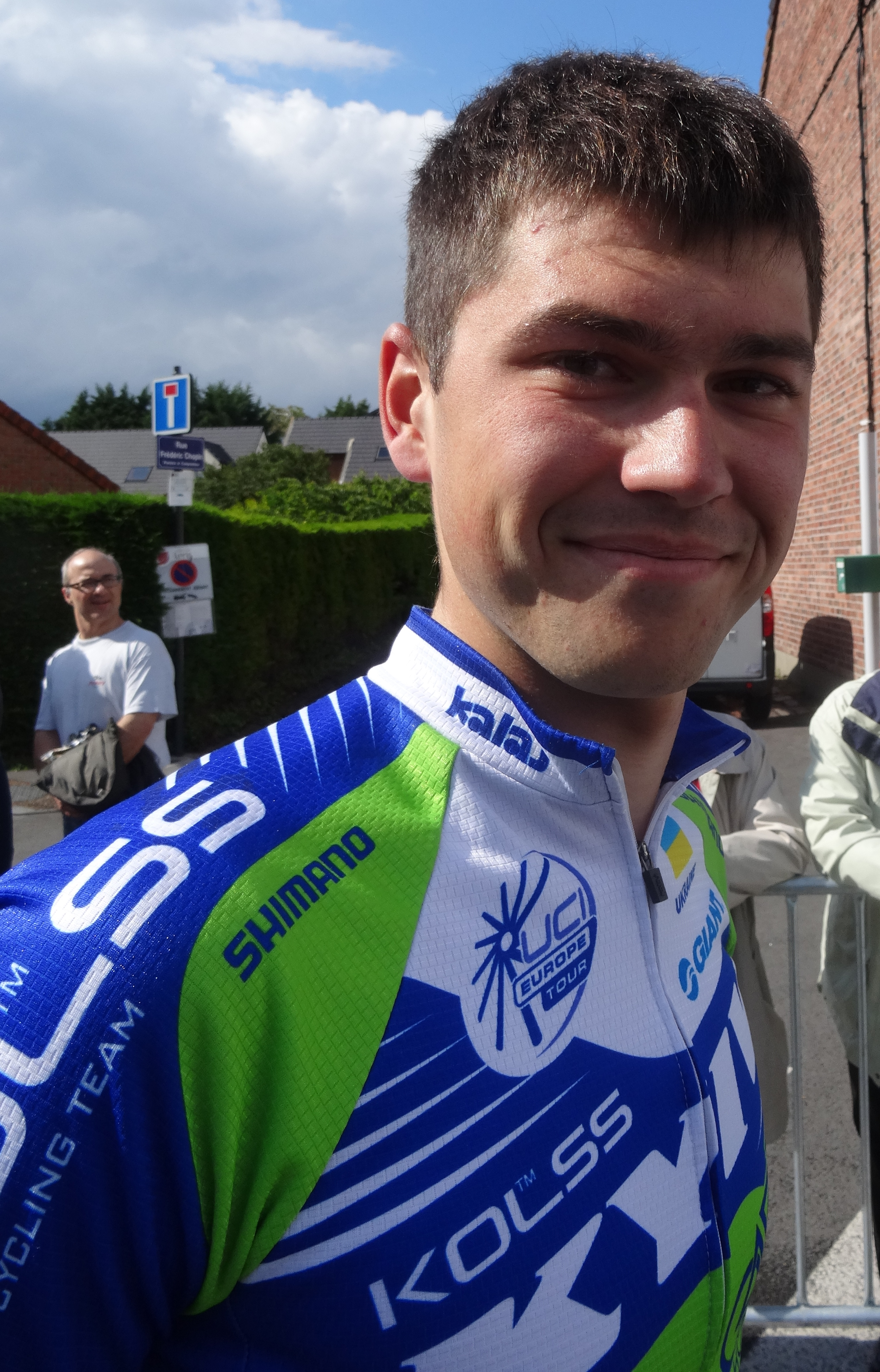
- Bratashchuk at the 2014 Paris-Arras Tour

Personal information
- Full name: Andrii Bratashchuk; Ukrainian: Андрій Братащук
- Born: 8 April 1992 (age 34) Rivne, Ukraine

Cycling career
- Sport: Cycling
- Discipline: Road
- Role: Rider

Professional teams
- 2012–2017: Kolss Cycling Team
- 2018–2019: Team Novak

Andrii Bratashchuk (Ukrainian: Андрій Братащук; born 8 April 1992) is a Ukrainian cyclist, who last rode for UCI Continental team Team Novak. He rode at the 2016 UCI Road World Championships in the road race, but failed to finish.

== Major results ==
2016
2nd Overall Tour of Małopolska
National Road Championships

4th Road race
4th Time trial

2017
National Road Championships

2nd Road race
4th Time trial

2nd Minsk Cup
7th Korona Kocich Gór
9th Odessa Grand Prix
9th Overall Tour of China II
2018
1st Stage 3 Tour de Hongrie
National Road Championships

2nd Road race
4th Time trial
