= Manuel Belletti =

Italian road bicycle racer (born 1985)

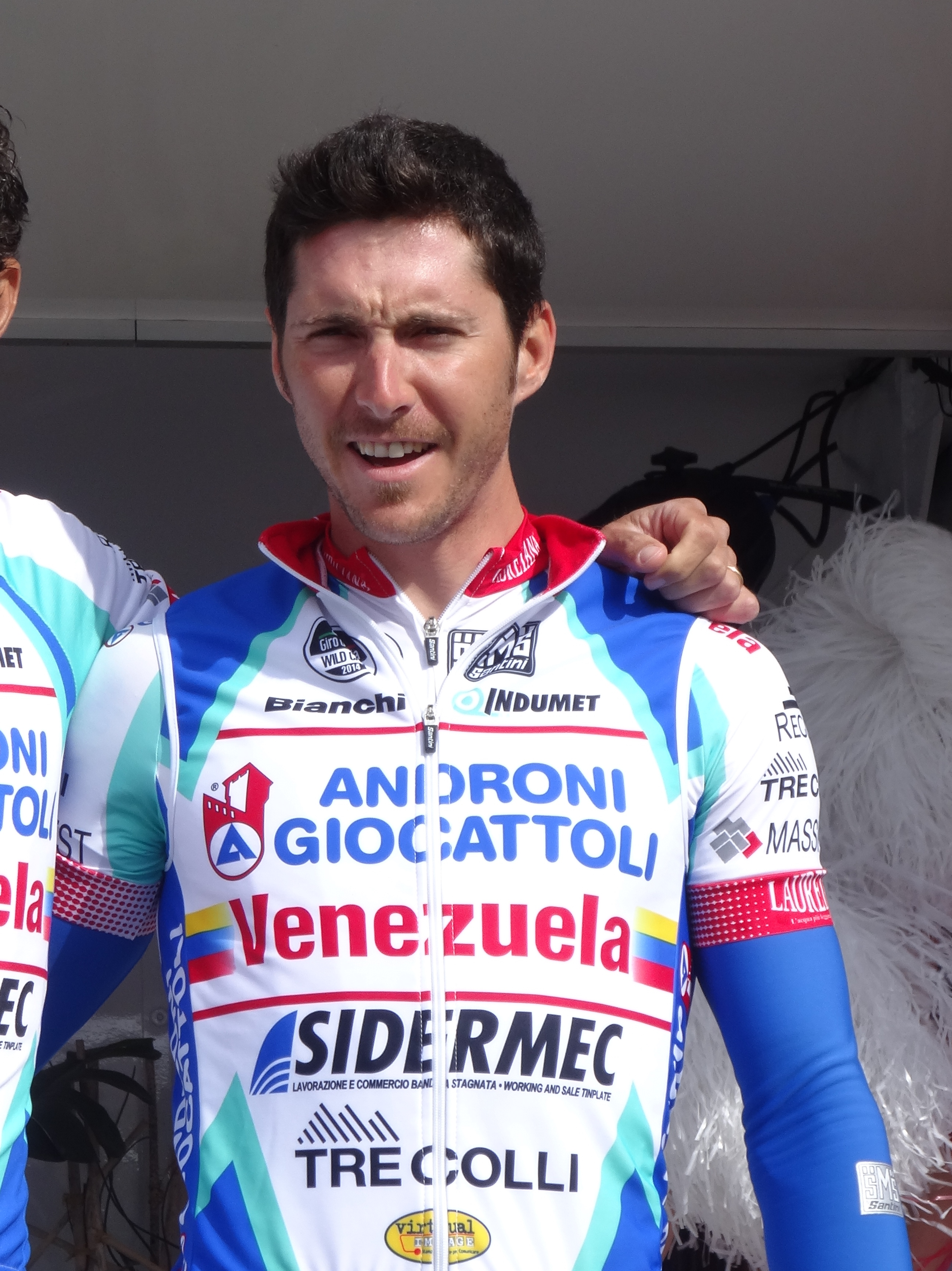
- Belletti in 2014.

Personal information
- Full name: Manuel Belletti
- Born: 14 October 1985 (age 41) Cesena, Italy
- Height: 1.75 m (5 ft 9 in)
- Weight: 68 kg (150 lb)

Cycling career
- Sport: Cycling
- Discipline: Road
- Role: Rider
- Rider type: Sprinter

Amateur teams
- 2004–2005: Eternedile
- 2006–2007: U.C. Trevigiani

Professional teams
- 2008–2009: Diquigiovanni–Androni
- 2010–2011: Colnago–CSF Inox
- 2012–2013: Ag2r–La Mondiale
- 2014: Androni Giocattoli–Venezuela
- 2015–2017: Southeast Pro Cycling
- 2018–2020: Androni Giocattoli–Sidermec
- 2021: Eolo–Kometa

Major wins
- Grand Tours Giro d'Italia 1 individual stage (2010) One-day races and Classics Coppa Bernocchi (2010)

Manuel Belletti (born 14 October 1985) is an Italian former professional road bicycle racer, who last rode for UCI ProTeam Eolo–Kometa. He took a total of 21 professional wins during his career, nine of them on Italian soil.

== Career ==
Belletti was born in Cesena.

=== Early career ===
The first time Belletti showed his cycling skills to the public was when he participated at the 2004 Italian National Track Championships where he and his team mates Loris Gobbi, Alan Marangoni and Matteo Montaguti cycled to second position at the team pursuit. Nearly two years later he booked his first success in road cycling, with U.C. Trevigiani when he finished third in the San Bernardino di Lugo and second in the San Donà di Piave. His first win came in the Giro Ciclisto Pesche Nettarine di Romagna where he won the first part of the fourth stage with the finish in Lugo, Emilia-Romagna. He reached the third spot in the Roncoleva di Trevenzuola before claiming his second career win in stage 1 of the Giro del Veneto in Lonigo. Later that season he finished second in three more races, the Mezzano Inferiore, the Ponton Criterium and the Somma Lombardo. 2007 turned to be another successful year at amateur level as he recorded another four wins, starting off with the Memorial Danilo Furlan and two stages in the Giro Ciclisto Pesche Nettarine di Romagna. Also this season he managed to win a stage in the Giro del Veneto, the fifth stage with the finish in Cassola. Furthermore he finished second in the Trofeo Alcide Degasperi and the GP Cementizillo, while finishing third in the Somma Lombardo.

=== Diquigiovanni–Androni (2008–2009) ===
Belletti signed his first professional contract in 2008 and started riding for Diquigiovanni–Androni. The team sent him to Venezuela to participate in the 2008 Vuelta a Venezuela where he finished three times in second position, in stages 1, 6 and 14. After this stage race Belletti stayed in Venezuela to ride in the Clásico Ciclístico Banfoandes, a race over 149.7 kilometres (93.0 miles) with the start in Punto Fijo and the finish in Coro. After 3 hours, 38 minutes and 15 seconds Belletti won the race to claim his first professional victory.

Also in 2009 Belletti rode some races in South America, this time in Argentina where he came in third in stage 3 of the Giro del Sol San Juan and in stage 6 of the Tour de San Luis. His first European success as a professional was recorded in his home country when he came third in the sprint of the 5th stage of the Giro di Sardegna behind winner Alessandro Petacchi and second placed Daniele Bennati. In the Giro del Friuli he even beat Petacchi, but still came in third as this time Mirco Lorenzetto and Grega Bole took the first two spots. Later on in the Giro di Toscana he finished in second position behind Petacchi. Another two top-three results were recorded when Belletti finished third in the 1st stage of the Tour of Austria behind André Greipel and Graeme Brown and second in the Grand Prix de Fourmies behind Romain Feillu.

=== Colnago–CSF Inox (2010–2011) ===
Belletti had shown his talent and his skills, resulting in interest from other teams. He then signed a new contract with Colnago–CSF Inox for the 2010 season. His first notable result for his new team was a second spot in the first part of the second stage in the Circuit de la Sarthe. In preparation of his first ever Grand tour, the 2010 Giro d'Italia he rode in the Tour of Turkey and claimed a third spot in the 6th stage, finishing in Finike. During the Giro d'Italia which started in Amsterdam, Netherlands Belletti claimed the fourth spot in the sixth stage finishing in Marina di Carrara. Thirteen turned out to be Belletti's lucky number as he managed to join a breakaway group on the road to Cesenatico in the 13th stage of the race. The group kept an advantage on the peloton of more than seven minutes and Belletti turned out to be the fastest sprinter of the breakaway group, claiming his first victory in a grand tour and his first victory for his new team; Two days later he abandoned the race. A couple of months later he finished fourth and third in two stages of the Brixia Tour, fifth and third in two stages of the Danmark Rundt and a fourth position in the Dutch Veenendaal–Veenendaal Classic. In August he claimed his second and last victory of that season by beating Danilo Hondo and Mark Cavendish in the sprint of the Coppa Bernocchi. Later that season he finished second in the first stage of the Tour of Britain, second in the Memorial Viviana Manservisi and third in the Memorial Marco Pantani.

2011 started very well for Belletti who claimed his first victory of the season in January, when he won the third stage of the Giro della Provincia di Reggio Calabria. Less than a month later he came second behind Peter Sagan in the fourth stage of the Giro di Sardegna, but he claimed his second victory of the season in March in the first stage of the Settimana Internazionale di Coppi e Bartali. He then claimed second spot in the first stage of the Vuelta a Castilla y León before winning his third race of the year in Marmaris, Turkey during the third stage of the Tour of Turkey. Just like the year before this race was a preparation for the Giro d'Italia in which he showed his sprinting strength by finishing third behind Petacchi and Cavendish in the second stage. He abandoned the race just after its halfway point. His fourth and last win of 2011 came when he claimed the third stage of the Brixia Tour, where he was the first of four Italians to reach the finish line in Prevalle. He finished the year with a third place in the sixth stage of the Danmark Rundt, a second place in the Coppa Bernocchi, another third place in the Gran Premio Industria e Commercio Artigianato Carnaghese, a second spot in the second stage of the Settimana Ciclistica Lombarda, a third place in the first stage of the Giro di Padania and a second place in the Gran Premio Bruno Beghelli.

=== Ag2r–La Mondiale (2012–2013) ===
For the 2012 season Belletti made a change to the French team Ag2r–La Mondiale. In the first couple of months of the season he could not continue the form of the previous years as he just managed to finish in fifth position in the third stage of the Tirreno–Adriatico and in the Scheldeprijs.

=== Androni Giocattoli–Venezuela (2014) ===
Belletti left Ag2r–La Mondiale at the end of the 2013 season, and joined Androni Giocattoli–Venezuela for the 2014 season. He took one win with the team, in the fourth stage of the 2014 Tour du Limousin.

=== Southeast Pro Cycling (2015–2017) ===
Belletti joined Southeast Pro Cycling (formerly known as Neri Sottoli) for the 2015 season.

=== Return to Androni Giocattoli (2018–2020) ===
In 2018 Belletti rejoined the Androni team, now known as Androni Giocattoli–Sidermec. His victories during this period with the team included a stage win and the overall classification at the 2018 Tour de Hongrie, another stage win in the 2019 edition of the same race, and a stage win in the 2019 Giro di Sicilia.

=== Eolo–Kometa and retirement (2021) ===
In November 2020 Eolo–Kometa announced that they had signed Belletti for the 2021 season. He retired from competition at the end of the year, with his last race being the 2021 Gran Piemonte in October.

== Major results ==
2004
2nd Team pursuit, National Track Championships
2006
1st Stage 1 Giro del Veneto
1st Stage 4a Giro Ciclisto Pesche Nettarine di Romagna
2nd Mezzano Inferiore
2nd San Donà di Piave
2nd Somma Lombardo
2nd Gran Premio della Liberazione
3rd Roncoleva di Trevenzuola
3rd Trofeo Banca Popolare di Vicenza
3rd San Bernardino di Lugo
2007
1st Trofeo Banca Popolare di Vicenza
1st Memorial Danilo Furlan
Giro Ciclisto Pesche Nettarine di Romagna

1st Stages 4 & 5

1st Stage 5 Giro del Veneto
2nd Trofeo Alcide Degasperi
2nd GP Cementizillo
3rd Somma Lombardo
2008
1st Stage 1 Clásico Ciclístico Banfoandes
2009
2nd Giro di Toscana
2nd Grand Prix de Fourmies
3rd Giro del Friuli
8th Gran Premio Industria e Commercio Artigianato Carnaghese
2010
1st Coppa Bernocchi
1st Stage 13 Giro d'Italia
2nd Gran Premio Città di Misano – Adriatico
3rd Memorial Marco Pantani
4th Dutch Food Valley Classic
2011
1st Stage 3 Giro della Provincia di Reggio Calabria
1st Stage 1a Settimana Internazionale di Coppi e Bartali
1st Stage 3 Tour of Turkey
1st Stage 3 Brixia Tour
2nd Coppa Bernocchi
2nd Gran Premio Bruno Beghelli
3rd Gran Premio Industria e Commercio Artigianato Carnaghese
6th Gran Premio Industria e Commercio di Prato
7th Gran Premio della Costa Etruschi
2012
Route du Sud

1st Points classification
1st Stage 4

5th Scheldeprijs
5th Paris–Brussels
6th Gran Premio Bruno Beghelli
7th Gran Premio della Costa Etruschi
8th Vattenfall Cyclassics
2013
4th Gran Premio Bruno Beghelli
2014
1st Stage 4 Tour du Limousin
4th Grand Prix de Fourmies
5th Route Adélie
7th Gran Premio Nobili Rubinetterie
7th Gran Premio Bruno Beghelli
10th Memorial Marco Pantani
2015
1st Gran Premio della Costa Etruschi
1st Dwars door Drenthe
1st Stage 1a Settimana Internazionale di Coppi e Bartali
2nd Gran Premio Bruno Beghelli
6th Ronde van Drenthe
8th Gran Premio Industria e Commercio di Prato
2016
1st Points classification Presidential Tour of Turkey
1st Stage 1a Settimana Internazionale di Coppi e Bartali
2nd Trofeo Matteotti
5th Grand Prix de Fourmies
2017
2nd Gran Premio della Costa Etruschi
2nd Trofeo Matteotti
9th Brussels Cycling Classic
2018
1st Overall Tour de Hongrie

1st Points classification
1st Stage 1

Tour of Hainan

1st Stages 3 & 5

1st Stage 7 Tour de Langkawi
2nd Coppa Bernocchi
3rd Gran Premio Bruno Beghelli
4th Paris–Camembert
6th Gran Piemonte
2019
Giro di Sicilia

1st Points classification
1st Stage 2

Tour de Hongrie

1st Points classification
1st Stage 1

1st Stage 1 Tour de Bretagne
7th Trofeo Matteotti
2020
8th Milano–Torino

=== Grand Tour general classification results timeline ===
Grand Tour	2010	2011	2012	2013	2014	2015	2016	2017	2018	2019	2020	2021
Giro d'Italia	DNF	DNF	DNF	144	DNF	DNF	DNF	—	123	109	—	DNF
Tour de France	Has not contested during his career											
Vuelta a España	Has not contested during his career											

Legend
—	Did not compete
IP	In progress
DNF	Did not finish
