= Oleksandr Prevar =

Ukrainian cyclist (born 1990)

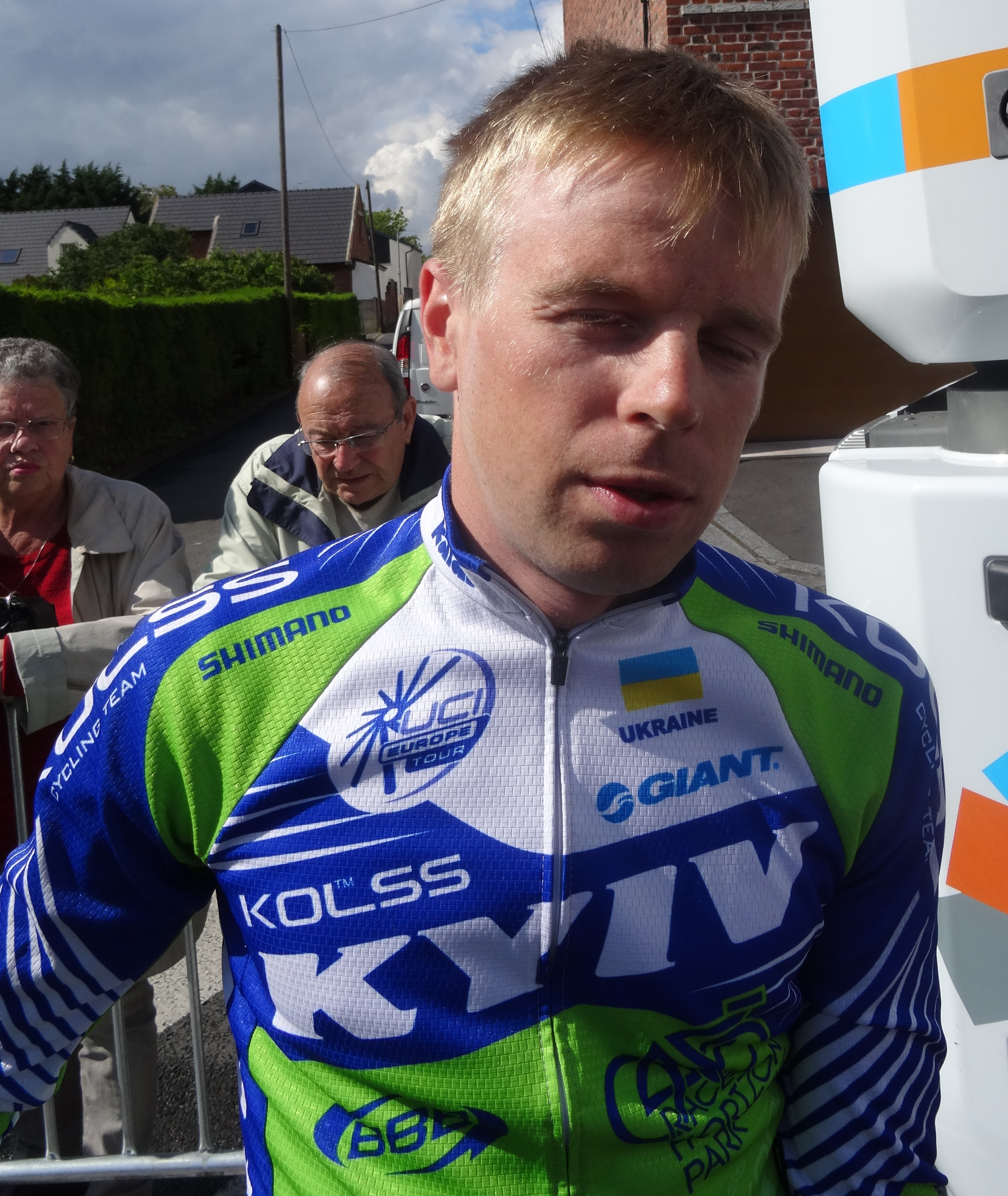
- Prevar in 2014

Personal information
- Full name: Oleksandr Petrovich Prevar
- Born: 28 June 1990 (age 36): Vinnytsia, Ukrainian SSR, Soviet Union; (now Ukraine)

Cycling career
- Sport: Cycling
- Current team: Spor Toto Cycling Team
- Discipline: Road
- Role: Rider

Professional teams
- 2010–2017: Kolss Cycling Team
- 2018: Team Novak
- 2019: Kyiv Capital Team
- 2020: Yunnan Lvshan Landscape
- 2021: Lviv Cycling Team
- 2022–: Spor Toto Cycling Team

Oleksandr Petrovich Prevar (Ukrainian: Олександр Петрович Превар; born 28 June 1990) is a Ukrainian cyclist, who currently rides for UCI Continental team Spor Toto Cycling Team.

== Major results ==
2011
4th Overall Tour of Szeklerland
8th Golan II
9th Overall Grand Prix of Adygeya
2012
8th Overall Carpathia Couriers Paths
2014
3rd Puchar Uzdrowisk Karpackich
7th Overall Tour of Szeklerland
2015
5th GP Slovakia
7th GP Hungary
10th Korona Kocich Gór
2016
1st Odessa Grand Prix
3rd Time trial, National Road Championships
8th GP Polski
9th Overall CCC Tour - Grody Piastowskie
2017
1st Horizon Park Classic
3rd Time trial, National Road Championships
4th Overall Tour of Ukraine

1st Stage 2 (TTT)

6th Memoriał Romana Siemińskiego
9th Horizon Park Race for Peace
10th Tour de Ribas
10th Memoriał Andrzeja Trochanowskiego
2018
2nd Overall Tour of Szeklerland

1st Mountains classification
1st Stage 2

7th Overall Tour de Hongrie
2019
1st Mountains classification Tour of Black Sea
4th Overall Tour of Mevlana
9th Horizon Park Race for Peace
