= 2022 Vuelta a Asturias =

Spanish cycling race

2022 Vuelta Asturias
2022 UCI Europe Tour

Race details
- Dates: 29 April – 1 May 2022
- Stages: 3
- Distance: 491 km (305 mi)

Results
| Jersey awarded to the overall winner | Winner | Iván Sosa (COL) | (Movistar Team) |
| | Second | Lorenzo Fortunato (ITA) | (Eolo–Kometa) |
| | Third | Nicolas Edet (FRA) | (Arkéa–Samsic) |
| Jersey awarded to the points classification winner | Points | Simon Yates (GBR) | (Team BikeExchange–Jayco) |
| Jersey awarded to the mountains classification winner | Mountains | Isaac Cantón (ESP) | (Manuela Fundación) |
| Jersey awarded to the sprints classification winner | Sprints | Jesús Ezquerra (ESP) | (Burgos BH) |
| Jersey awarded to the team classification winner | Team | Arkéa–Samsic | |

The 2022 Vuelta Asturias Julio Alvarez Mendo was a road cycling stage race that took place between 29 April and 1 May 2021 in the Asturias region of northwestern Spain. It was the 64th edition of the Vuelta Asturias and was part of the 2022 UCI Europe Tour calendar as a category 2.1 event.

== Teams ==
Two UCI WorldTeam, seven UCI ProTeams, and five UCI Continental teams made up the fifteen teams that participated in the race. All but three teams fielded the maximum of seven riders: Arkéa–Samsic, Electro Hiper Europa–Caldas and Team TotalEnergies entered six and BAI–Sicasal–Petro de Luanda entered five. There was a total of 100 riders that started the race.

UCI WorldTeams

- Team BikeExchange–Jayco
- Movistar Team

UCI ProTeams

- Arkéa–Samsic
- Burgos BH
- Caja Rural–Seguros RGA
- Equipo Kern Pharma
- Eolo–Kometa
- Euskaltel–Euskadi
- Team TotalEnergies

UCI Continental Teams

- BAI–Sicasal–Petro de Luanda
- Efapel Cycling
- Electro Hiper Europa–Caldas
- Java Kiwi Atlántico
- Aviludo–Louletano–Loulé Concelho
- Manuela Fundación

== Route ==
Stage characteristics and winners
| Stage | Date | Route | Distance | Type | Winner |
|---|---|---|---|---|---|
| 1 | 29 April | Oviedo to Pola de Lena | 169 km (105 mi) | Mountain stage | Simon Yates (GBR) |
| 2 | 30 April | Candás to Cangas del Narcea | 200 km (120 mi) | Mountain stage | Iván Sosa (COL) |
| 3 | 1 May | Cangas del Narcea to Oviedo | 122 km (76 mi) | Mountain stage | Simon Yates (GBR) |
| Total | | | 491 km (305 mi) | | |
