= Kőbánya Cycling Team =

Team information
- UCI code: KBN
- Registered: Hungary
- Founded: 2016
- Disbanded: 2018
- Discipline: Road
- Status: UCI Continental

Team name history
- 2016–2018: Kőbánya Cycling Team

Kőbánya Cycling Team was a UCI Continental team founded in 2016 and based in Hungary. It participates in UCI Continental Circuits races.

== Team roster ==
Rider	Date of birth
Bernard Bendeguz (HUN)	15 February 1988 (age 38)
Balazs Bertalan (HUN)	26 June 1997 (age 29)
Cristian Bianchetti (ITA)	20 March 1977 (age 49)
Balazs Czeh (HUN)	22 April 1998 (age 28)
Zsolt Istlstekker (HUN)	10 February 1998 (age 28)
Attila Laszlo (HUN)	23 December 1997 (age 28)
Zoltan Lengyel (HUN)	25 April 1995 (age 31)
Bence Loki (HUN)	19 December 1994 (age 31)

Rider	Date of birth
Krisztián Lovassy (HUN)	23 June 1988 (age 38)
Albeto Marengo (ITA)	13 May 1994 (age 32)
Daniel Moricz (HUN)	26 March 1996 (age 30)
Erik Vevatne Overland (NOR)	19 August 1995 (age 31)
Matteo Pascazi (ITA)	15 March 1993 (age 33)
Bjornar Overland (NOR)	18 May 1998 (age 28)
Samuele Oliveto (ITA)	20 July 1994 (age 32)
