= Louis Bendixen =

Danish bicycle racer

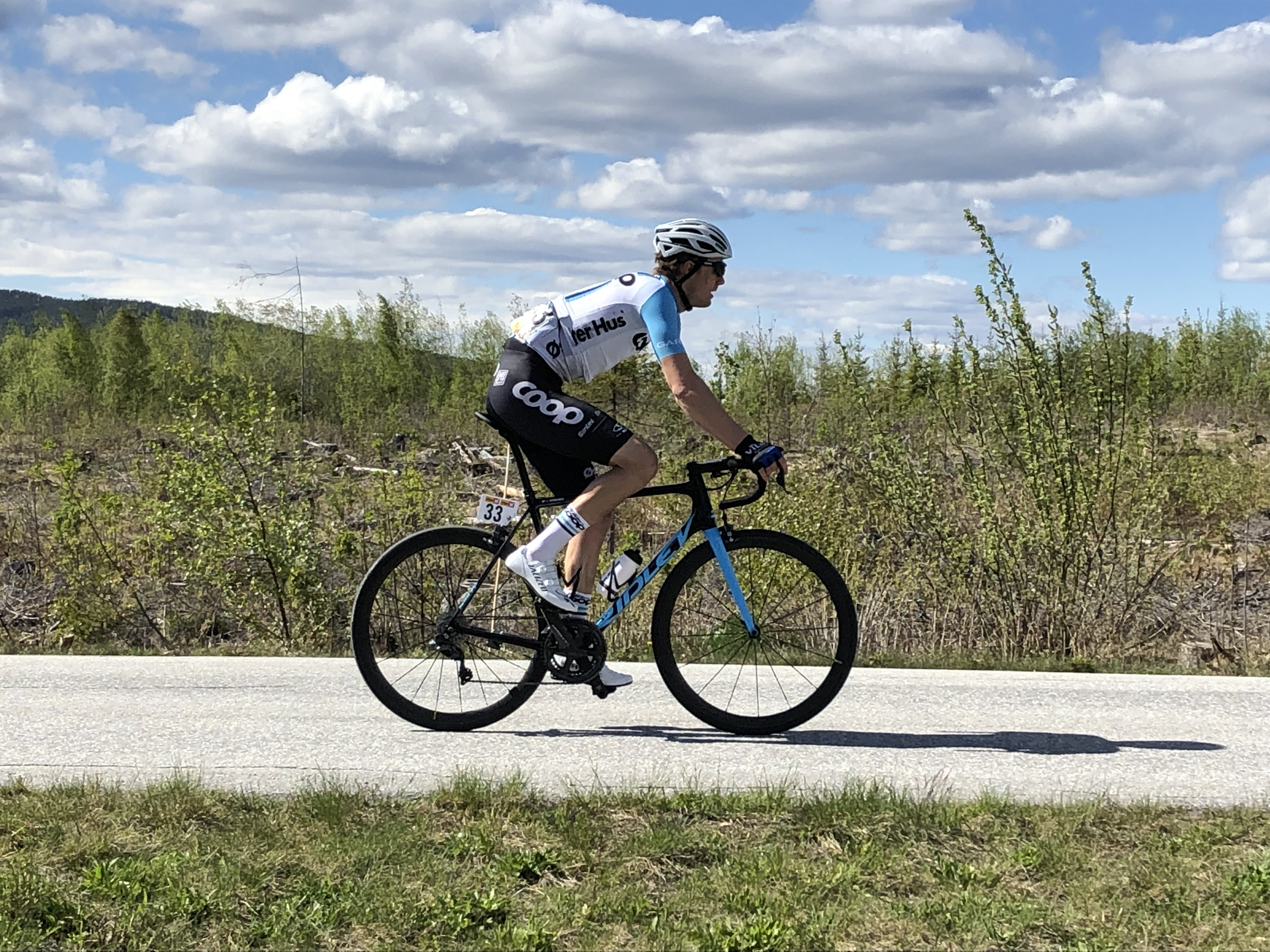
- Bendixen at the 2019 Ringerike Grand Prix

Personal information
- Born: 23 June 1995 (age 31) Copenhagen, Denmark

Cycling career
- Sport: Cycling
- Discipline: Road
- Role: Rider

Amateur teams
- 2013: CK Fix Rødovre
- 2014: Webike DMK
- 2015: ABC–Arbejdernes Bicykle Club

Professional teams
- 2016–2017: Team ColoQuick–Cult
- 2018–2022: Team Coop
- 2023–2024: Uno-X Pro Cycling Team

Louis Bendixen (born 23 June 1995) is a Danish cyclist, who last rode for UCI ProTeam Uno-X Mobility.

== Major results ==
2017
9th Fyen Rundt
2019
4th Overall Dookoła Mazowsza
2020
5th Time trial, National Road Championships
7th Hafjell GP
2021
1st Puchar Ministra Obrony Narodowej
4th International Rhodes Grand Prix
2022
1st Overall International Tour of Rhodes

1st Stages 1 & 2

5th Road race, National Road Championships
2023
9th Omloop van het Houtland
