= Mehdi Benhamouda =

French cyclist (born 1995)

Personal information
- Born: 2 January 1995 (age 31) Carcassonne, France
- Height: 1.73 m (5 ft 8 in)
- Weight: 64 kg (141 lb)

Cycling career
- Sport: Cycling
- Current team: Retired
- Discipline: Road
- Role: Rider

Amateur teams
- 2013–2014: AS Carcassonne
- 2015: Novo Nordisk Development

Professional team
- 2016–2022: Team Novo Nordisk

Mehdi Benhamouda (born 2 January 1995) is a French former racing cyclist, who competed as a professional from 2016 to 2022 for UCI ProTeam Team Novo Nordisk. He was diagnosed with diabetes at the age of 13.
