= Isaac Cantón =

Spanish cyclist

Personal information
- Full name: Isaac Cantón Serrano
- Born: 13 June 1996 (age 30) Argamasilla de Alba, Spain
- Height: 1.8 m (5 ft 11 in)
- Weight: 65 kg (143 lb)

Cycling career
- Sport: Cycling
- Current team: Manuela Fundación
- Discipline: Road
- Role: Rider

Amateur teams
- 2015–2016: Infisport–Alavanet
- 2017–2018: Polartec–Fundación A.Contador

Professional teams
- 2018–2019: Kometa Cycling Team
- 2020–2021: Burgos BH
- 2022–: Manuela Fundación

Isaac Cantón Serrano (born 13 June 1996) is a Spanish cyclist, who currently rides for UCI Continental team Manuela Fundación.

== Major results ==
2017
1st Road race, National Under-23 Road Championships
2019
9th Prueba Villafranca-Ordiziako Klasika
2022
1st Mountains classification Vuelta a Asturias
