= Zoltán Lengyel =

Hungarian politician

Member of the National Assembly
- In office 15 May 2002 – 26 November 2009

Personal details
- Born: 17 July 1960 (age 65) Budapest, People's Republic of Hungary
- Party: Independent (2007–present)
- Other political affiliations: Fidesz (1998–2007)
- Spouse: Dr Imelda Dobrovitzky
- Children: Kinga; Vanda
- Profession: politician

Zoltán Lengyel (born 17 July 1960) is a Hungarian politician and member of the National Assembly (MP) for Sárbogárd, Fejér County Constituency VI from 2002 to 2009, when he resigned.

== Biography ==
He graduated from Temesvári Pelbárt Franciscan Grammar School in Esztergom in 1978. He worked for Hungarian Car Club (MAK) as a semi-skilled worker for two years. He attended Faculty of Agriculture of Debrecen University of Agriculture (today part of University of Debrecen) in Mezőtúr in 1980. He degree in 1983. Later he graduated engineer and economic engineering postgraduate certificate qualification.

=== Political career ===
During first local elections after end of communism in 1990, he was elected to a member of the representative body of Sáregres. He became independent mayor of the municipality four years later. He could repeat his success for the next two elections, with the support of conservative parties. He lost his mayoral seat in 2006.

In the 1998 elections he was a candidate of the Fidesz party but he did not manage to get into the legislature. Four years later he became Member of Parliament for Sárbogárd (6th Constituency of Fejér County). He served as Vice Chairman of Parliamentary Committee of Agriculture from 2004 to 2006, and deputy leader of the Fidesz parliamentary group. He became a member of the National Assembly again in 2006. In addition he functioned as a member of the General Assembly of Fejér County between 1998 and 2006.

On 8 July 2007 he was charged with assaulting a policeman near the tunnel in Budapest after an identity check on the road. He hit a policeman who had asked him for his identity documents. Realising that he was not in possession of his papers, Lengyel then punched the police officer. He was subsequently handcuffed and taken to a police station. Both sides denounced the other. Later a series of pictures were posted on the Internet showing him naked before a crucifix in his home. As a result he left the Fidesz parliamentary faction and became an Independent MP. Lengyel also withdrew from the party itself.

He joined Independent Smallholders' National Unity Party (FKNP) and became its deputy chairman in 2008. In October 2008 he joined Hungarian Democratic Forum (MDF) parliamentary group so the small party has succeeded in retaining the necessary number of representatives to ensure that it remains as a parliamentary force. The bitterly divided conservative party appeared on the verge of collapse after one of its MPs, János Vas, withdrew from its parliamentary group. Lengyel was appointed deputy leader of the group. He voted for the 2009 budget so he should left the Independent Smallholders' National Unity Party. He became Vice Chairman of the Parliamentary Committee on Sport and Tourism. Finally the MDF group dissolved in March 2009 when its number fell below ten persons. Lengyel became a non-partisan MP again.

On 26 May 2009 Buda Central District Court sentenced him to eight-month suspended prison for violence against a public official, resulting minor injuries and challenging a police officer's integrity. He attempted suicide in October by taking a large dose of tranquillisers, but was taken to hospital and rescued after his wife discovered him. After that he told reporters that his trial on those charges "is not proceeding as it should. I stand alone against the apparatus of the police and prosecutors. Witnesses are testifying against me who were not at the scene and who attribute words and expressions to me that I never uttered". Lengyel resigned from his parliamentary seat on November 25, 2009 when the court ruling suspended imprisonment. His position remained vacant until the parliamentary elections in 2010.

== Personal life ==
He is married. His wife is Dr Imelda Dobrovitzky. They have two daughters, Kinga and Vanda.
