= Stefano Oldani =

Italian racing cyclist (born 1998)

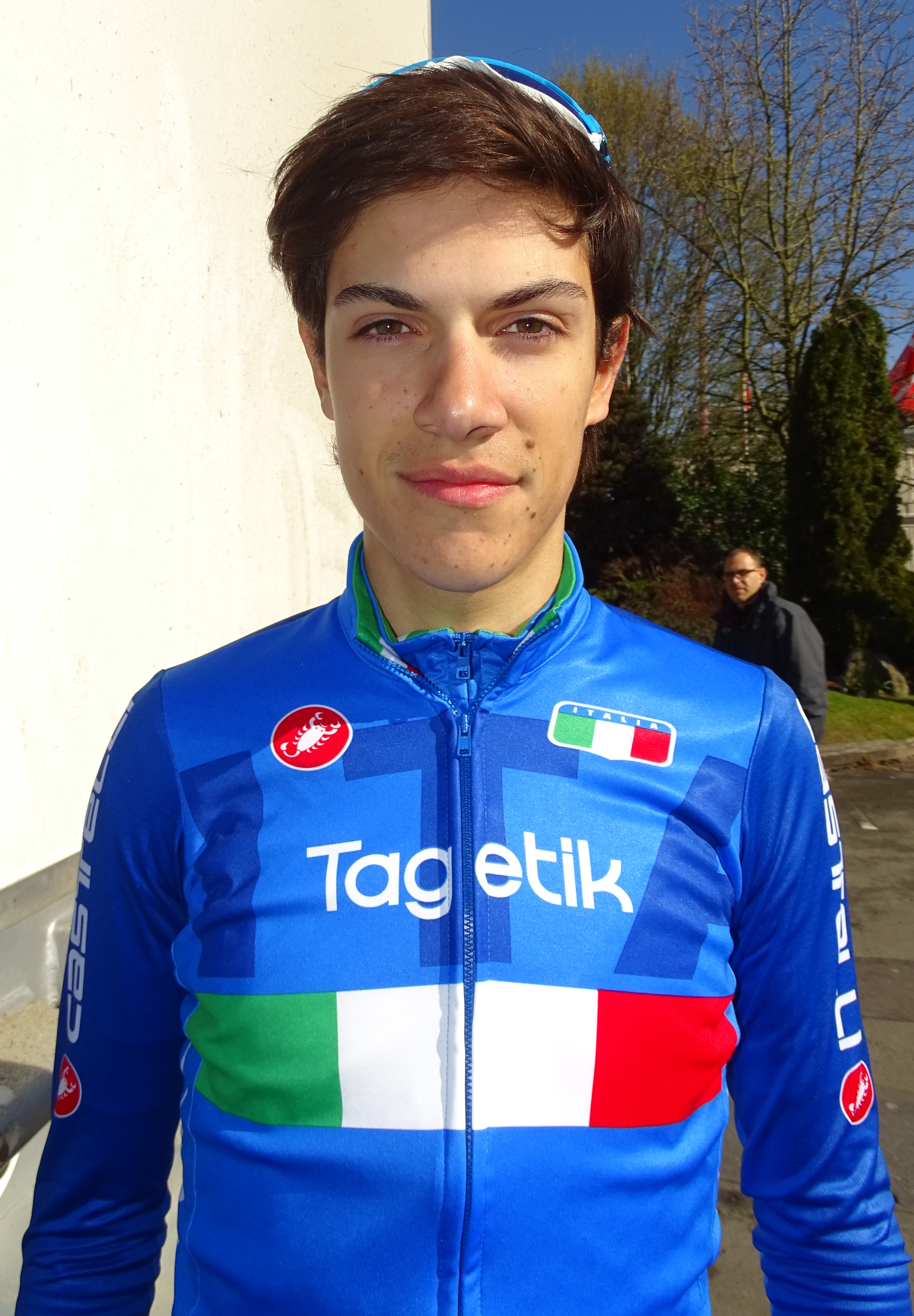
- Oldani at the 2016 Paris–Roubaix Juniors

Personal information
- Full name: Stefano Oldani
- Born: 10 January 1998 (age 28) Milan, Italy
- Height: 1.78 m (5 ft 10 in)
- Weight: 65 kg (143 lb)

Cycling career
- Sport: Cycling
- Current team: Caja Rural–Seguros RGA
- Discipline: Road
- Role: Rider

Amateur teams
- 2017–2018: Team Colpack
- 2018: Polartec–Kometa (stagiaire)

Professional teams
- 2019: Kometa Cycling Team
- 2020–2021: Lotto–Soudal
- 2022–2023: Alpecin–Fenix
- 2024–2025: Cofidis
- 2026–: Caja Rural–Seguros RGA

Major wins
- Grand Tours Giro d'Italia 1 individual stage (2022)

Stefano Oldani (born 10 January 1998) is an Italian cyclist, who currently rides for UCI ProTeam Caja Rural–Seguros RGA. Professional since 2019, he won the 12th stage of the 2022 Giro d'Italia from the breakaway.

== Major results ==
2015
2nd Trofeo Comune di Vertova
3rd GP Dell'Arno
2016
1st Time trial, Junior National Road Championships
Grand Prix Rüebliland

1st Points classification
1st Stage 4

4th Trofeo Citta di Loano
9th Trofeo Buffoni
2017
6th GP Capodarco
2018
5th Trofeo Piva
2019
5th Overall Istrian Spring Trophy
7th Overall Tour de Hongrie
7th Poreč Trophy
2021
2nd Vuelta a Castilla y León
10th Gran Piemonte
2022
Giro d'Italia

1st Stage 12
Combativity award Stage 4

2nd Volta Limburg Classic
3rd Coppa Bernocchi
4th Grand Prix de Fourmies
4th Veneto Classic
8th Overall Danmark Rundt
8th La Drôme Classic
10th Coppa Agostoni
2024
3rd Overall Tour de l'Ain

1st Points classification

4th Memorial Marco Pantani
5th Gran Premio Castellón
8th Trofeo Ses Salines-Felanitx
9th Prueba Villafranca de Ordizia
10th Hamburg Cyclassics
2025
7th Eschborn–Frankfurt
8th Coppa Agostoni
2026
8th Overall Deutschland Tour
8th Trofeo Matteotti

=== Grand Tour general classification results timeline ===
Grand Tour	2020	2021	2022	2023	2024	2025	2026
Giro d'Italia	98	79	84	45	DNF	67	—
Tour de France	—	—	—	—	—	—	IP
Vuelta a España	—	—	—	—	—	—	—

Legend
—	Did not compete
DNF	Did not finish
IP	Race in Progress
