= Cycling Federation of Serbia =

National governing body of cycle racing in Serbia

The Cycling Federation of Serbia or BSS (in Serbian Cyrillic: Бициклистички савез Србије, in the Latin alphabet: Biciklistički savez Srbije) is the national governing body of cycle racing in Serbia. The BSS is a member of the UCI and the UEC.
