= Daniel Bichlmann =

German cyclist (born 1988)

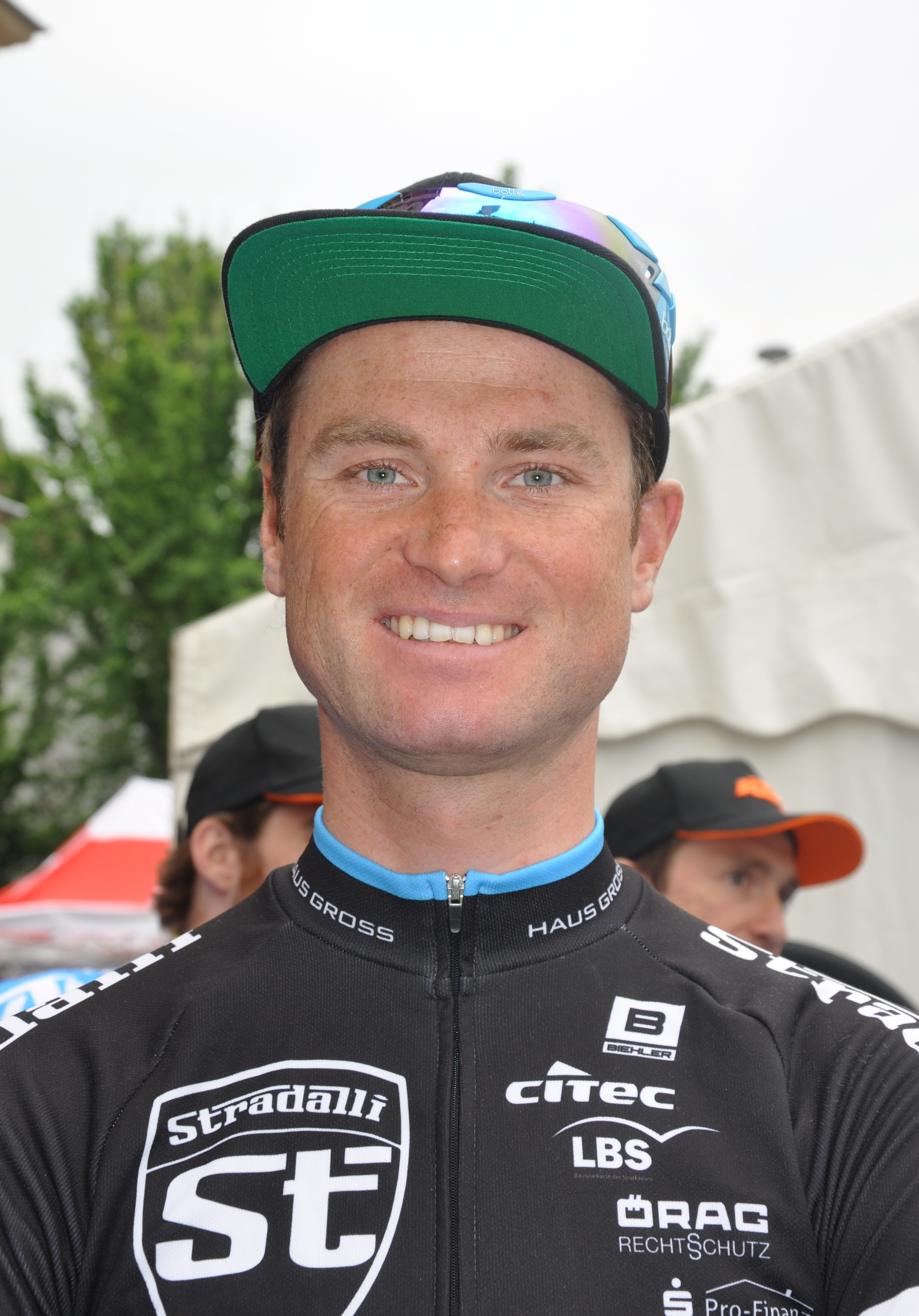
- Bichlmann in 2016

Personal information
- Full name: Daniel Bichlmann
- Born: 18 August 1988 (age 38) Siegsdorf, Germany

Cycling career
- Sport: Cycling
- Current team: Maloja Pushbikers
- Discipline: Road
- Role: Rider

Amateur teams
- 2004–2009: RSV 1948 Traunstein
- 2006: LV Bayern
- 2008–2009: Herbalife–Focus
- 2010: RSV Rosenheim
- 2011–2013: Team Baier Landshut
- 2012–2013: Bike Aid

Professional teams
- 2014–2020: Bike Aid–Ride for Help
- 2021–: Maloja Pushbikers

Daniel Bichlmann (born 18 August 1988) is a German professional racing cyclist, who currently rides for UCI Continental team Maloja Pushbikers. He rode in the men's team time trial at the 2016 UCI Road World Championships.

== Major results ==
2014
8th Overall Tour du Cameroun

1st Stage 5

2021
1st Overall Tour du Faso

1st Stage 5
