= Gian Friesecke =

Swiss cyclist (born 1994)

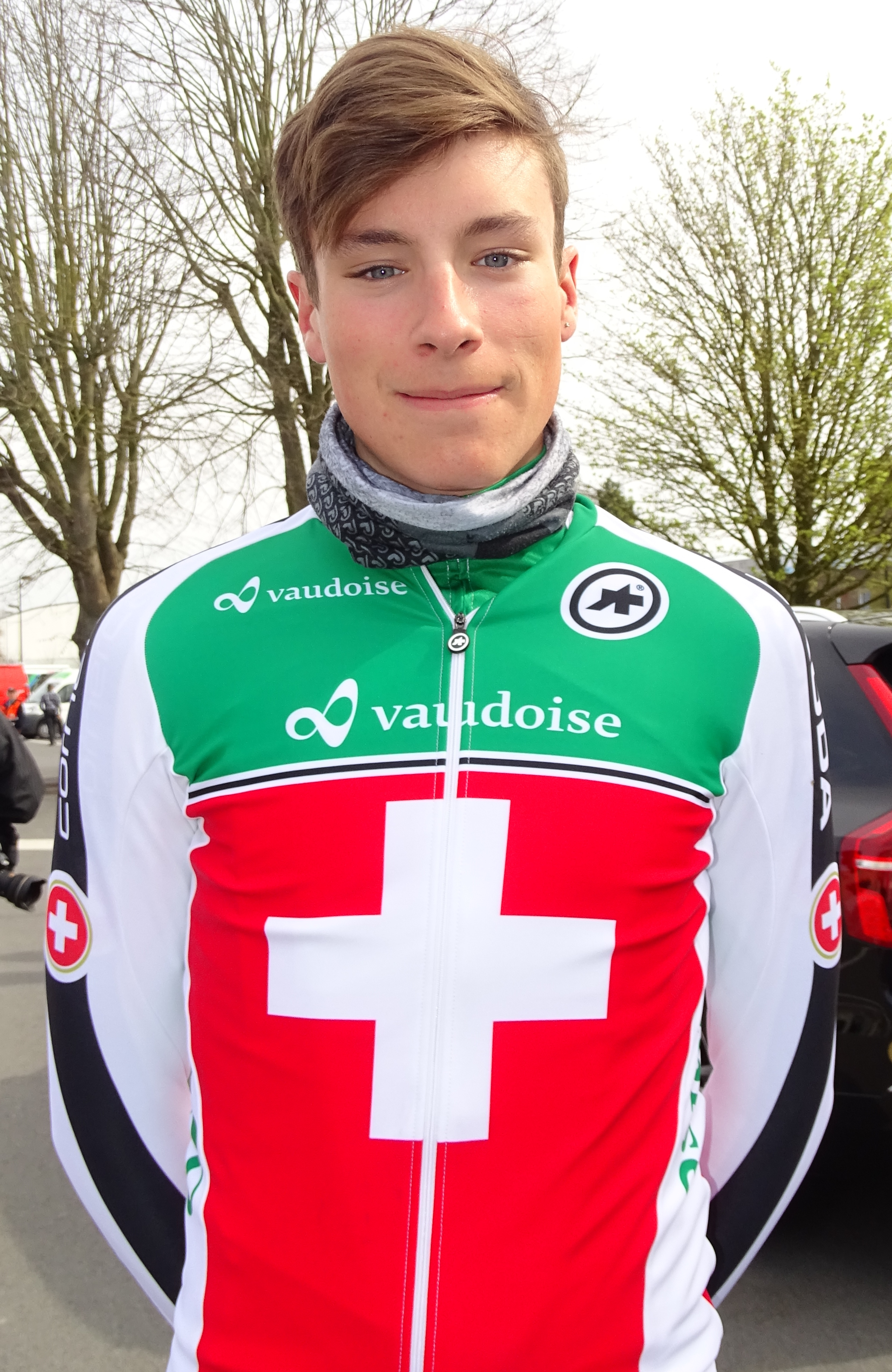
- Friesecke in 2016

Personal information
- Full name: Gian Friesecke
- Born: 26 November 1994 (age 31)

Cycling career
- Sport: Cycling
- Discipline: Road
- Role: Rider

Amateur team
- 2014–2016: EZK Racing

Professional teams
- 2017–2018: Team Vorarlberg
- 2019: Swiss Racing Academy

Gian Friesecke (born 26 November 1994) is a Swiss racing cyclist, who last rode for UCI Continental team Swiss Racing Academy. He rode for Team Vorarlberg Santic in the men's team time trial event at the 2018 UCI Road World Championships.

== Major results ==
2017
6th Tour du Jura
7th Tour de Berne
8th Rund um Köln
10th Rad am Ring
10th Poreč Trophy
2018
3rd Tour de Vendée
8th Poreč Trophy
2019
2nd Grand Prix Gazipaşa
5th Overall Tour d'Eure-et-Loir

1st Mountains classification

9th Overall Tour du Jura Cycliste
