= Pannon Cycling Team =

Team information
- Registered: Hungary
- Founded: 2018
- Discipline: Road
- Status: UCI Continental

Pannon Cycling Team is a UCI Continental team founded in 2018 and based in Hungary. It participates in UCI Continental Circuits races.

== Team roster ==
Rider	Date of birth
Daniel Dina (HUN)	7 November 1987 (age 38)
Viktor Filutas (HUN)	28 September 1996 (age 29)
Botond Hollo (HUN)	28 April 1992 (age 34)
Mate Kovacs (HUN)	23 April 1996 (age 30)
Andras Krivan (HUN)	24 April 1993 (age 33)
Dina Marton (HUN)	11 April 1996 (age 30)
Gergely Orosz (HUN)	28 April 1999 (age 27)
Zoltan Ruttkay (HUN)	12 July 1995 (age 31)

Rider	Date of birth
Peter Simon (HUN)	14 October 1991 (age 34)
Miklos Szabo (SVK)	18 September 1998 (age 27)
Andras Szatmary (HUN)	21 August 1990 (age 36)
Ferenc Szollosi (HUN)	2 December 1998 (age 27)
Attila Valter (HUN)	12 June 1998 (age 28)
Zsombor Wermeser (HUN)	23 March 1998 (age 28)
Mark Zathureczky (HUN)	22 July 1997 (age 29)

== Major results ==
2018
Hungary U23 Time Trial Championships, Attila Valter
Hungary U23 Road Race Championships, Attila Valter

2019
V4 Special Series Debrecen - Ibrany, János Pelikán
Gemenc Grand Prix II, János Pelikán
Stage 2 Tour de Serbia, János Pelikán

== National Champions ==
2018
U23 Time Trial, Attila Valter
U23 Road Race, Attila Valter
