= Team Novak =

Romanian cycling team

Team information
- UCI code: TNV
- Registered: Romania
- Founded: 2018
- Discipline: Road
- Status: UCI Continental (2018–2022); Club (2023–)

Key personnel
- General manager: Szabolcs Sebestyén
- Team managers: Tamás Csicsáky; Ferenc Stubán

Team name history
- 2018–: Team Novak

Team Novak is a Romanian cycling team established in 2018. The team held UCI Continental status until 2023 when it downgraded to club status.

== Team roster ==
As of 27 February 2021.

Rider	Date of birth
Facundo Crisafulli (ARG)	20 March 1996 (age 30)
Agustín Del Negro (ARG)	9 March 2000 (age 26)
Yegor Dementyev (UKR)	12 March 1987 (age 39)
Nándor Lázár (ROU)	25 March 1992 (age 34)
Carol-Eduard Novak (ROU)	28 July 1976 (age 50)

Rider	Date of birth
Sándor Poszti (ROU)	17 October 2002 (age 23)
Jaime Restrepo (COL)	26 September 1996 (age 29)
Balázs Rózsa (HUN)	26 November 1995 (age 30)
András Szentpéteri (HUN)	7 July 1996 (age 30)
Szilárd Török (ROU)	8 August 2000 (age 26)

== Major results ==
2018
Moldova National Time Trial Championships, Nicolae Tanovițchii
Overall Tour of Szeklerland, Nicolae Tanovițchii

Stage 1, Yegor Dementyev
Stage 2, Oleksandr Prevar
Stage 3, Andrii Bratashchuk
Stage 4a (ITT), Nicolae Tanovițchii

Stage 3 Tour de Hongrie, Andrii Bratashchuk
