= Manuela Fundación =

Spanish cycling team

Team information
- UCI code: MAN
- Registered: Spain
- Founded: 2022
- Disbanded: 2022
- Discipline: Road
- Status: UCI Continental
- Bicycles: Orbea
- Website: Team home page

Key personnel
- Team managers: Jose Vicente Bonillo; Francisco Puñal

Team name history
- 2022: Manuela Fundación

Manuela Fundación (UCI team code: MAN) was a Spanish UCI Continental cycling team that competed only for the 2022 season.

== Team roster ==
As of 25 February 2022.

Rider	Date of birth
Joan Bennassar (ESP)	30 May 1999 (age 27)
Isaac Cantón (ESP)	13 June 1996 (age 30)
Francisco José Casaus (ESP)	28 May 1995 (age 31)
Franklin Chacón (VEN)	16 July 1998 (age 28)
Vicente Hernaiz (ESP)	28 November 1998 (age 27)
Daniel Jiménez (ESP)	26 March 2002 (age 24)

Rider	Date of birth
Erik Martorell (ESP)	26 June 1998 (age 28)
Santiago Mesa (COL)	11 November 1997 (age 28)
Sebastián Mora (ESP)	19 February 1988 (age 38)
Eduardo Pérez-Landaluce (ESP)	1 May 1998 (age 28)
Raúl Rota (ESP)	18 November 1999 (age 26)
Miquel Valls (ESP)	31 January 2000 (age 26)
