= 2006 UCI Road World Championships – Men's road race =

Men's Individual Road Race
2006 UCI Road World Championships
- Rainbow jersey

Race details
- Dates: September 24, 2006
- Stages: 1
- Distance: 265.2 km (164.8 mi)
- Winning time: 06h 15' 32"

Medalists
	Gold	Paolo Bettini (ITA)	(Italy)
	Silver	Erik Zabel (GER)	(Germany)
	Bronze	Alejandro Valverde (ESP)	(Spain)

The 2006 edition of the men's UCI Road World Championships Road Race took place on September 24, 2006, in the Austrian city of Salzburg. Reigning Olympic champion and Italian Paolo Bettini captured the gold medal and the rainbow jersey as the 2006 World Cycling Champion. The 36-year-old German sprinter Erik Zabel took the silver medal and UCI ProTour winner Alejandro Valverde of Spain captured third place for the bronze medal. A total of 136 cyclists actually finished the race, with Slovakia's Roman Broniš in last place (+ 13'38").

== Final classification ==
Rank	Rider	Nation	Time
1	Paolo Bettini	Italy	6h 15' 36" (42.476 km/h)
2	Erik Zabel	Germany	+ 0"
3	Alejandro Valverde	Spain	+ 0"
4	Samuel Sánchez	Spain	+ 2"
5	Robbie McEwen	Australia	+ 2"
6	Stuart O'Grady	Australia	+ 2"
7	Uroš Murn	Slovenia	+ 2"
8	Alexander Bocharov	Russia	+ 2"
9	Tom Boonen	Belgium	+ 2"
10	Vladimir Gusev	Russia	+ 2"
11	Bernhard Eisel	Austria	+ 2"
12	Nicki Sørensen	Denmark	+ 2"
13	Kurt Asle Arvesen	Norway	+ 2"
14	Martin Elmiger	Switzerland	+ 2"
15	Freddie Rodriguez	United States	+ 2"
16	Karsten Kroon	Netherlands	+ 2"
17	Marcus Ljungqvist	Sweden	+ 2"
18	René Haselbacher	Austria	+ 2"
19	László Bodrogi	Hungary	+ 2"
20	Gerben Löwik	Netherlands	+ 2"
21	Stefan Schumacher	Germany	+ 2"
22	Steffen Wesemann	Switzerland	+ 2"
23	Christophe Le Mével	France	+ 2"
24	Anthony Geslin	France	+ 2"
25	Andrey Kashechkin	Kazakhstan	+ 2"
26	Alexandr Kolobnev	Russia	+ 2"
27	Matija Kvasina	Croatia	+ 2"
28	Michael Boogerd	Netherlands	+ 2"
29	Fränk Schleck	Luxembourg	+ 2"
30	Moisés Aldape Chávez	Mexico	+ 2"
31	Fabian Cancellara	Switzerland	+ 2"
32	Gorazd Štangelj	Slovenia	+ 2"
33	Nuno Ribeiro	Portugal	+ 2"
34	Danilo Di Luca	Italy	+ 2"
35	David Millar	Great Britain	+ 2"
36	Xavier Florencio	Spain	+ 2"
37	Grégory Rast	Switzerland	+ 2"
38	Luca Paolini	Italy	+ 2"
39	David George	South Africa	+ 2"
40	Cadel Evans	Australia	+ 2"
41	Rui Sousa	Portugal	+ 2"
42	Sérgio Paulinho	Portugal	+ 2"
43	Vladimir Karpets	Russia	+ 2"
44	Alexander Arekeev	Russia	+ 2"
45	Sylvain Chavanel	France	+ 2"
46	Tadej Valjavec	Slovenia	+ 15"
47	Christopher Horner	United States	+ 15"
48	Davide Rebellin	Italy	+ 15"
49	Carlos Sastre	Spain	+ 15"
50	Michael Rogers	Australia	+ 15"
51	Filippo Pozzato	Italy	+ 15"
52	Alexander Vinokourov	Kazakhstan	+ 15"
53	Sergei Yakovlev	Kazakhstan	+ 34"
54	Fabian Wegmann	Germany	+ 56"
55	Marlon Pérez Arango	Colombia	+ 1' 25"
56	Kanstantsin Sivtsov	Belarus	+ 1' 25"
57	Raivis Belohvoščiks	Latvia	+ 1' 53"
58	José Carlos Rodrigues	Portugal	+ 1' 53"
59	Radoslav Rogina	Croatia	+ 1' 53"
60	Ján Valach	Slovakia	+ 1' 53"
61	Alexandre Usau	Belarus	+ 1' 53"
62	Roger Hammond	Great Britain	+ 1' 53"
63	Ruslan Pidgornyy	Ukraine	+ 1' 53"
64	Dainius Kairelis	Lithuania	+ 1' 53"
65	Georg Totschnig	Austria	+ 1' 53"
66	Stijn Devolder	Belgium	+ 1' 53"
67	Max van Heeswijk	Netherlands	+ 1' 53"
68	Christian Vande Velde	United States	+ 1' 53"
69	Aurélien Clerc	Switzerland	+ 1' 53"
70	Cyril Dessel	France	+ 1' 53"
71	Sébastien Joly	France	+ 1' 53"
72	Joaquim Rodríguez	Spain	+ 1' 53"
73	Michael Albasini	Switzerland	+ 1' 53"
74	Lars Bak	Denmark	+ 1' 53"
75	Yaroslav Popovych	Ukraine	+ 1' 53"
76	Nick Nuyens	Belgium	+ 1' 53"
77	Borut Božič	Slovenia	+ 2' 02"
78	Erki Pütsep	Estonia	+ 3' 33"
79	Alexandre Bazhenov	Russia	+ 3' 43"
80	Przemysław Niemiec	Poland	+ 3' 43"
81	Daniel Petrov	Bulgaria	+ 3' 43"
82	Jurgen Van Goolen	Belgium	+ 6' 19"
83	Martin Riška	Slovakia	+ 6' 19"
84	Kjell Carlström	Finland	+ 6' 19"
85	Matej Mugerli	Slovenia	+ 6' 19"
86	Nélson Vitorino	Portugal	+ 6' 19"
87	Roman Kreuziger	Czech Republic	+ 6' 19"
88	Alessandro Ballan	Italy	+ 6' 19"
89	Simon Gerrans	Australia	+ 6' 19"
90	Vladimir Efimkin	Russia	+ 6' 19"
91	Bram Tankink	Netherlands	+ 6' 19"
92	Philippe Gilbert	Belgium	+ 6' 19"
93	Thomas Voeckler	France	+ 6' 19"
94	Sylvain Calzati	France	+ 6' 19"
95	Alexander Efimkin	Russia	+ 6' 19"
96	Robert Hunter	South Africa	+ 6' 19"
97	Beat Zberg	Switzerland	+ 6' 19"
98	Alexei Markov	Russia	+ 6' 19"
99	Christian Knees	Germany	+ 6' 19"
100	Mathew Hayman	Australia	+ 6' 19"
101	Mauricio Alberto Ardila Cano	Colombia	+ 6' 19"
102	Jonathan Patrick McCarty	United States	+ 6' 19"
103	Oliver Zaugg	Switzerland	+ 6' 19"
104	Tomáš Bucháček	Czech Republic	+ 6' 19"
105	David Loosli	Switzerland	+ 6' 19"
106	Patrik Sinkewitz	Germany	+ 6' 19"
107	Guido Trenti	United States	+ 6' 19"
108	Janez Brajkovič	Slovenia	+ 6' 19"
109	Francisco José Ventoso Alberdi	Spain	+ 6' 19"
110	Luis Pérez Rodríguez	Spain	+ 6' 19"
111	Volodymyr Zagorodniy	Ukraine	+ 6' 19"
112	Andriy Hrivko	Ukraine	+ 6' 19"
113	Gabriel Rasch	Norway	+ 6' 19"
114	Thor Hushovd	Norway	+ 6' 19"
115	Íñigo Cuesta Lopez De Castro	Spain	+ 6' 59"
116	Ryan Cox	South Africa	+ 6' 59"
117	Christian Pfannberger	Austria	+ 6' 59"
118	Danny Pate	United States	+ 6' 59"
119	Marzio Bruseghin	Italy	+ 6' 59"
120	David McCann	Ireland	+ 8' 45"
121	Petr Benčík	Czech Republic	+ 8' 45"
122	Matej Jurčo	Slovakia	+ 8' 45"
123	Tomasz Marczyński	Poland	+ 8' 45"
124	Fumiyuki Beppu	Japan	+ 8' 45"
125	Allan Johansen	Denmark	+ 8' 45"
126	Roman Broniš	Slovakia	+ 13' 38"
DNF	Félix Rafael Cardenas Ravalo	Colombia	
DNF	Matteo Tosatto	Italy	
DNF	Rinaldo Nocentini	Italy	
DNF	José Adrián Bonilla	Costa Rica	
DNF	Aliaksandr Kychinski	Belarus	
DNF	Serge Baguet	Belgium	
DNF	Tarmo Raudsepp	Estonia	
DNF	Russell Downing	Great Britain	
DNF	Julio Alberto Pérez Cuapio	Mexico	
DNF	Juan Antonio Flecha Giannoni	Spain	
DNF	Krzysztof Szczawiński	Poland	
DNF	Hidenori Nodera	Japan	
DNF	Philip Deignan	Ireland	
DNF	Stephan Schreck	Germany	
DNF	Danail Petrov	Bulgaria	
DNF	Leif Hoste	Belgium	
DNF	Kevin Hulsmans	Belgium	
DNF	Matthew White	Australia	
DNF	Nicolas Roche	Ireland	
DNF	Nick Gates	Australia	
DNF	Ronny Scholz	Germany	
DNF	Marcel Sieberg	Germany	
DNF	José Rujano Guillen	Venezuela	
DNF	Tyler Farrar	United States	
DNF	Ian McLeod	South Africa	
DNF	Luis Felipe Laverde	Colombia	
DNF	Chris Baldwin	United States	
DNF	Bradley McGee	Australia	
DNF	Hrvoje Miholjević	Croatia	
DNF	Aleksejs Saramotins	Latvia	
DNF	Shinichi Fukushima	Japan	
DNF	Luciano André Pagliarini	Brazil	
DNF	Bram de Groot	Netherlands	
DNF	Jan Boven	Netherlands	
DNF	Maarten Tjallingii	Netherlands	
DNF	Kyrylo Pospyeyev	Ukraine	
DNF	Mauricio Soler	Colombia	
DNF	Ryder Hesjedal	Canada	
DNF	Darren Lill	South Africa	
DNF	Sébastien Hinault	France	
DNF	Martin Mareš	Czech Republic	
DNF	Peter Wrolich	Austria	
DNF	Linus Gerdemann	Germany	
DNF	Bruno Neves	Portugal	
DNF	Murilo Fischer	Brazil	
DNF	Mart Ojavee	Estonia	
DNF	Stanislav Kozubek	Czech Republic	
DNF	Marek Rutkiewicz	Poland	
DNF	Tomasz Kiendyś	Poland	
DNF	Martin Prázdnovský	Slovakia	
DNF	Maroš Kováč	Slovakia	
DNF	Volodymyr Starchyk	Ukraine	
DNF	Gerardo Fernández	Argentina	
DNF	Svetoslav Tchanliev	Bulgaria	
DNF	Manuel Eduardo Medina Marino	Venezuela	
DNF	Thierry Marichal	Belgium	
DNF	Jackson Stewart	United States	
DNF	Pedro Nicacio	Brazil	
DNF	Tiaan Kannemeyer	South Africa	
DNF	Samuel Dumoulin	France	
DNF	Jorge Martín Montenegro	Argentina	
DNF	Joost Posthuma	Netherlands	
DNF	Bernhard Kohl	Austria	
DNF	František Raboň	Czech Republic	
DNF	Robert Radosz	Poland	
DNF	Alex Cano Ardila	Colombia	
DNF	Márcio May	Brazil	
DNF	Soelito Gohr	Brazil	
DNF	Jose Antonio Ramos Querales	Venezuela	
DNF	Abdul Wahab Sawadogo	Burkina Faso	
DNF	Rabaki Jérémie Ouédraogo	Burkina Faso	
DNF	Saïdou Rouamba	Burkina Faso	

== Selected riders ==
Based on the results of the riders in the UCI ProTour and UCI Continental Circuits in 2006, all nations have received a number of riders they can send to the championships. The number of allowed riders is different for each continent:

- Qualified Nations by the UCI Protour: Australia, Belgium, France, Germany, Italy, Netherlands, Russia, Spain and Switzerland get 9 starters. Canada, Finland, Hungary, Lithuania and Luxembourg get 1 starter.
- Qualified Nations by the UCI Africa Tour: South Africa gets 6 starters. Burkina Faso gets 3 starters.
- Qualified Nations by the UCI America Tour: Brazil and Colombia get 6 starters. Argentina, Mexico and Venezuela get 3 starters. Costa Rica and Cuba get 1 starter.
- Qualified Nations by the UCI Asia Tour: Iran gets 6 starters. Kazakhstan and Japan get 3 starters.
- Qualified Nations by the UCI European Tour: Czech Republic, Poland, Portugal, Slovenia, Slovakia and Ukraine get 6 starters. Austria, Belarus, Bulgaria, Croatia, Denmark, Estonia, Great Britain, Ireland, Latvia and Norway get 3 starters. Sweden gets 1 starter. Note: Because Austria is the host nation, they are given 3 extra starters to give them 6 riders in total.
- Qualified Nations by the UCI Oceania Tour: New Zealand gets 3 starters.

All nations are allowed to select reserves too, 5 reserves for nations with 9 riders, 3 reserves for nations with 6 riders, 2 reserves for nations with 3 riders and 1 reserve for nations with 1 rider.

=== Nations allowed nine riders ===
==== Australia ====
On September 14, the selection was released:

- Cadel Evans, Davitamon–Lotto
- Nick Gates, Davitamon–Lotto
- Simon Gerrans, AG2R Prévoyance
- Mathew Hayman, Rabobank
- Robbie McEwen, Davitamon–Lotto
- Bradley McGee, Française des Jeux
- Stuart O'Grady, Team CSC
- Michael Rogers, T-Mobile Team
- Matthew White, Discovery Channel

==== Belgium ====
National Coach: Carlo Bomans

On September 11, the selection was released:

- Serge Baguet, Quick-Step–Innergetic
- Tom Boonen, Quick-Step–Innergetic
- Stijn Devolder, Discovery Channel
- Philippe Gilbert, Française des Jeux
- Leif Hoste, Discovery Channel
- Kevin Hulsmans, Quick-Step–Innergetic
- Nick Nuyens, Quick-Step–Innergetic
- Jurgen Van Goolen, Discovery Channel
- ~~Johan Vansummeren, Davitamon–Lotto~~ Vansummeren was replaced by Thierry Marichal from Cofidis, because he severely injured his shoulder in a crash on training just days before the event.

Also 5 reserves were appointed:

- Björn Leukemans, Davitamon–Lotto
- Thierry Marichal, Cofidis
- Kevin van Impe, Quick-Step–Innergetic
- Geert Verheyen, Quick-Step–Innergetic
- Frederik Willems, Chocolade Jacques–Topsport Vlaanderen

==== France ====
Selection released on September 12:

- Sylvain Calzati, AG2R Prévoyance
- Sylvain Chavanel, Cofidis
- Cyril Dessel, AG2R Prévoyance
- Samuel Dumoulin, AG2R Prévoyance
- Anthony Geslin, Bouygues Télécom
- Sébastien Hinault, Crédit Agricole
- Sébastien Joly, Française des Jeux
- Christophe Le Mével, Crédit Agricole
- Thomas Voeckler, Bouygues Télécom

==== Germany ====
On September 11, the first selection was released, but since then many things have changed. Matthias Kessler and Jens Voigt have refused their selection as they claim to be "too tired after a long tiring season". Andreas Klöden has declared he only wants to ride in the Time Trial World Championships 2006.

Current Selection:

- Linus Gerdemann, T-Mobile Team
- Christian Knees, Team Milram
- Ronny Scholz, Gerolsteiner
- Stephan Schreck, T-Mobile Team
- Stefan Schumacher, Gerolsteiner
- Marcel Sieberg, Team Wiesenhof
- Patrik Sinkewitz, T-Mobile Team
- Fabian Wegmann, Gerolsteiner
- Erik Zabel, Team Milram

==== Italy ====
National coach Franco Ballerini selected the following riders:

- Alessandro Ballan, Lampre–Fondital
- Paolo Bettini, Quick-Step–Innergetic
- Marzio Bruseghin, Lampre–Fondital
- Danilo Di Luca, Liquigas
- Rinaldo Nocentini, Acqua & Sapone
- Luca Paolini, Liquigas
- Filippo Pozzato, Quick-Step–Innergetic
- Davide Rebellin, Gerolsteiner
- Matteo Tosatto, Quick-Step–Innergetic

==== Netherlands ====
National coach Egon van Kessel selected the following riders:

- Michael Boogerd, Rabobank
- Jan Boven, Rabobank
- Bram de Groot, Rabobank
- Karsten Kroon, Team CSC
- Gerben Löwik, Rabobank
- Joost Posthuma, Rabobank
- Bram Tankink, Quick-Step–Innergetic
- Maarten Tjallingii, Skil–Shimano
- Max van Heeswijk, Discovery Channel

==== Russia ====
- Alexander Arekeev, Acqua & Sapone
- Alexandre Bazhenov, Naturino–Sapore di Mare
- Alexander Bocharov, Crédit Agricole
- Alexander Efimkin, Barloworld
- Vladimir Efimkin, Caisse d'Epargne–Illes Balears
- Vladimir Gusev, Discovery Channel
- Vladimir Karpets, Caisse d'Epargne–Illes Balears
- Alexandr Kolobnev, Rabobank
- Alexei Markov, Caisse d'Epargne–Illes Balears

==== Spain ====
- Íñigo Cuesta, Team CSC
- Juan Antonio Flecha, Rabobank
- Xavier Florencio, Bouygues Télécom
- Luis Pérez Rodríguez, Cofidis
- Joaquim Rodríguez, Caisse d'Epargne–Illes Balears
- Samuel Sánchez, Euskaltel–Euskadi
- Alejandro Valverde, Caisse d'Epargne–Illes Balears
- Francisco Ventoso, Saunier Duval–Prodir
- Carlos Sastre, Team CSC

==== Switzerland ====
Selection released on September 14:

- Michael Albasini, Liquigas
- Fabian Cancellara, Team CSC
- Aurélien Clerc, Phonak
- Martin Elmiger, Phonak
- David Loosli, Lampre–Fondital
- Grégory Rast, Phonak
- Steffen Wesemann, T-Mobile Team
- Oliver Zaugg, Saunier Duval–Prodir
- Beat Zberg, Gerolsteiner

==== United States ====
- Chris Baldwin, Toyota–United
- Tyler Farrar, Cofidis
- Chris Horner, Davitamon–Lotto
- Jason McCartney, Discovery Channel
- Danny Pate, TIAA–CREF
- Fred Rodriguez, Davitamon–Lotto
- Jackson Stewart, Kodakgallery.com–Sierra Nevada Pro Cycling
- Guido Trenti, Quick-Step–Innergetic
- Christian Vande Velde, Team CSC

=== Nations allowed six riders ===
==== Austria ====
The home nation was represented by:

- Bernhard Eisel, Française des Jeux
- René Haselbacher, Gerolsteiner
- Bernhard Kohl, T-Mobile Team
- Christian Pfannberger, Elk Haus–Simplon
- Georg Totschnig, Gerolsteiner
- Peter Wrolich, Gerolsteiner

==== Brazil ====
- Murilo Fischer, Naturino–Sapore di Mare
- Soelito Gohr, Scott–Marcondes Cesar–São José dos Campos
- Márcio May, Scott/Marcondes
- Pedro Nicacio, Scott–Marcondes Cesar–São José dos Campos
- Luciano Pagliarini, Saunier Duval–Prodir

==== Colombia ====
- Mauricio Ardila, Rabobank
- Alex Caño, Unknown
- Félix Cárdenas, Barloworld
- Luis Felipe Laverde, Ceramica Panaria–Navigare
- Marlon Pérez Arango, Team Tenax Salmilano
- Mauricio Soler, Acqua & Sapone

==== Czech Republic ====
- Petr Benčík, PSK Whirlpool–Hradec Krlove
- Tomáš Bucháček, PSK Whirlpool–Hradec Krlove
- Stanislav Kozubek, PSK Whirlpool–Hradec Krlove
- Roman Kreuziger, Liquigas
- Martin Mareš, Naturino–Sapore di Mare
- František Raboň, T-Mobile Team

==== Poland ====
- Tomasz Kiendyś, Knauf Team
- Tomasz Marczyński, Ceramica Flaminia
- Przemysław Niemiec, Miche
- Robert Radosz, DHL–Author
- Marek Rutkiewicz, Intel–Action
- Kristzof Szczawinski, Ceramica Flaminia

==== Portugal ====
- Bruno Neves, Madeinox–BRIC–AR Canelas
- Sérgio Paulinho, Astana
- Nuno Ribeiro, LA Aluminios–Liberty Seguros
- José Rodrigues, Carvalhelhos–Boavista
- Rui Sousa, LA Aluminios–Liberty Seguros
- Nelson Victorino, Duja–Tavira

==== Slovenia ====
- Janez Brajkovič, Discovery Channel
- Borut Božič, Perutnina Ptuj
- Matej Mugerli, Liquigas
- Uroš Murn, Phonak
- Gorazd Štangelj, Lampre–Fondital
- Tadej Valjavec, Lampre–Fondital

==== Slovakia ====
- Roman Broniš, Dukla Trenčín
- Matej Jurčo, Team Milram
- Maroš Kováč, Dukla Trenčín
- Martin Prázdnovský, Team Sparebanken Vest
- Martin Riška, PSK Whirlpool–Hradec Krlove
- Ján Valach, Aposport Krone Linz

==== South Africa ====
- Ryan Cox, Barloworld
- David George, Relax
- Robert Hunter, Phonak
- Tiaan Kannemeyer, Barloworld
- Darren Lill, Schwinn
- Ian McLeod, Française des Jeux

==== Ukraine ====
- Andriy Hryvko, Team Milram
- Ruslan Pidgornyy, Tenax Nobili Rubinetterie
- Yaroslav Popovych, Discovery Channel
- Kyrylo Pospeyev, Acqua & Sapone
- Volodymyr Starchyk, Mykolaiv
- Volodymyr Zagorodniy, S. C. Pagnoncelli-NGC-Perrel

=== Nations allowed three riders ===
==== Argentina ====
- Gerardo Fernández, Viña Magna–Cropu
- Jorge Martín Montenegro, Unknown

==== Belarus ====
- Aliaksandr Kuscynski, Ceramica Flaminia
- Kanstantsin Sivtsov, Acqua & Sapone
- Alexander Usov, AG2R Prévoyance

==== Bulgaria ====
- Daniel Andonov Petrov, Maia Milaneza
- Daniel Petrov, Duja–Tavira
- Svetoslav Tchanliev, Unknown

==== Burkina Faso ====
- Rabaki Jérémie Ouédraogo, Unknown
- Abdul Wahab Sawadogo, Unknown
- Saïdou Rouamba, Unknown

==== Croatia ====
- Matija Kvasina, Perutnina Ptuj
- Hrvoje Miholjević, Perutnina Ptuj
- Radoslav Rogina, Perutnina Ptuj

==== Denmark ====
- Lars Bak, Team CSC
- Jakob Piil, Team CSC
- Nicki Sørensen, Team CSC

==== Estonia ====
- Mart Ojavee, Kalev Chocolate Team
- Erki Pütsep, AG2R Prévoyance
- Tarmo Raudsepp, Union Cycliste Nantes Atlantique

==== Great Britain ====
- Russell Downing, DFL–Cyclingnews–Litespeed
- Roger Hammond, Discovery Channel
- David Millar, Saunier Duval–Prodir

==== Ireland ====
- David McCann, Giant Asia Racing Team
- Nicolas Roche, Cofidis
- Philip Deignan, AG2R Prévoyance

==== Japan ====
- Fumiyuki Beppu, Discovery Channel
- Shinichi Fukushima, Cycle Racing Team Vang
- Hidenori Nodera, Skil–Shimano

==== Kazakhstan ====
- Andrey Kashechkin, Astana
- Alexander Vinokourov, Astana
- Sergei Yakovlev, Astana

==== Latvia ====
- Raivis Belohvoščiks, C.B. Immobiliare–Universal Caffé
- Aleksejs Saramotins, Rietumu Banka–Riga

==== New Zealand ====
New Zealand chose not to send riders to the Road World Championships 2006, as their most important riders are injured and thus unavailable.

==== Norway ====
- Kurt Asle Arvesen, Team CSC
- Thor Hushovd, Crédit Agricole
- Gabriel Rasch, Team Maxbo Bianchi

==== Venezuela ====
- Manuel Medina, Alcaldia de Cabimas
- José Ramos, Alcaldia de Cabimas
- José Rujano, Quick-Step–Innergetic

=== Nations allowed one rider ===
==== Canada ====
- Ryder Hesjedal, Phonak

==== Finland ====
- Kjell Carlström, Liquigas

==== Hungary ====
- László Bodrogi, Crédit Agricole

==== Lithuania ====
- Dainius Kairelis, Amore & Vita–McDonald's

==== Luxembourg ====
- Fränk Schleck, Team CSC

==== Sweden ====
- Marcus Ljungqvist, Team CSC
