= Czech National Road Race Championships =

National road cycling championship in the Czech Republic

The Czech National Road Race Championships (Czech: Mistrovství České republiky v silničním závodu) are held annually to decide the Czech cycling champions in the road race discipline, across various categories. The event was first held in 1994.

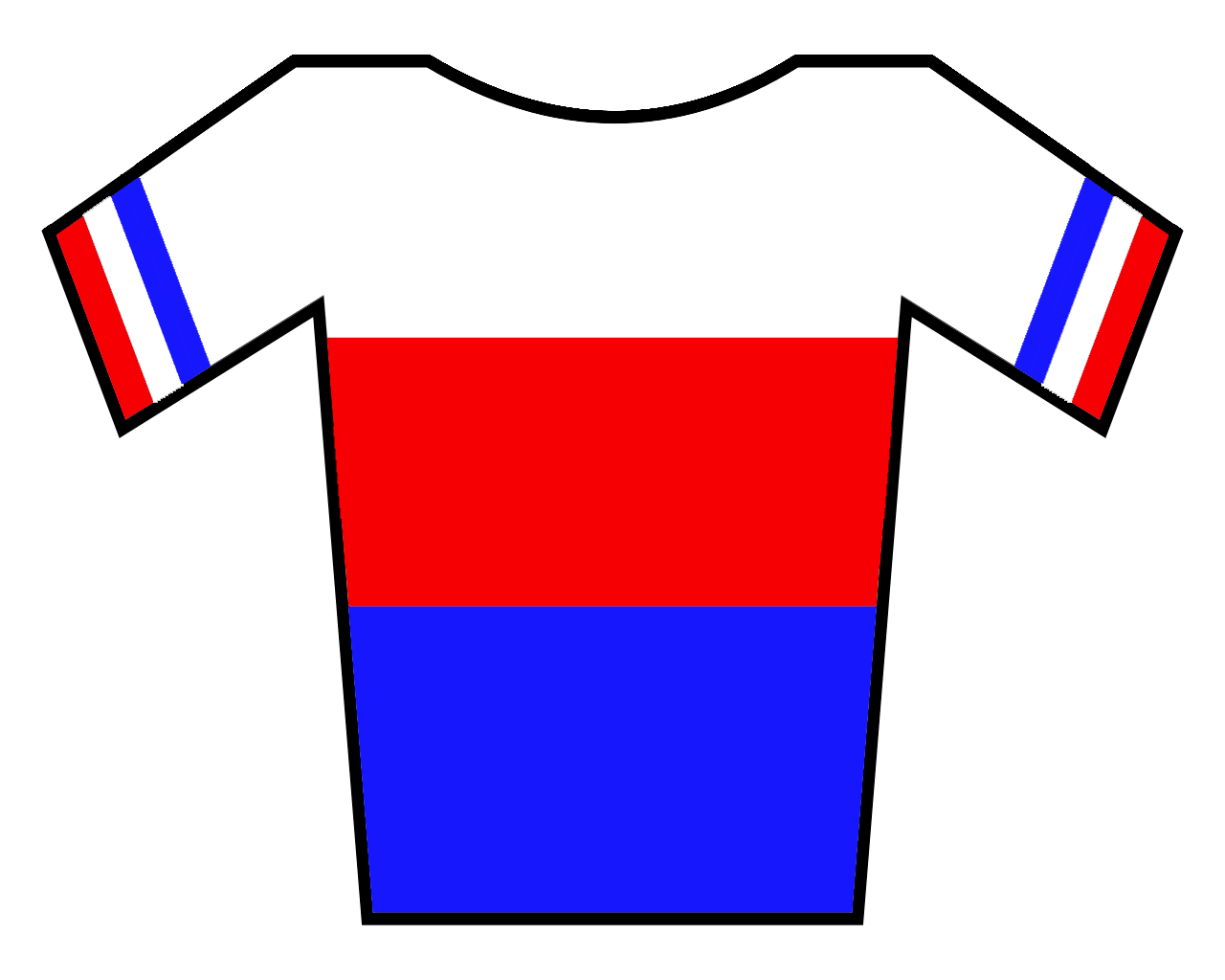

== Men ==
Year	Gold	Silver	Bronze
1994	Lubor Tesař	Tomáš Sedláček	Martin Kaňkovský
1995	René Andrle	Tomáš Velecký	Jaroslav Bílek
1996	Ján Svorada	René Andrle	František Trkal
1997	Jaromír Purmenský	Ondřej Fadrny	Tomáš Konečný
1998	Ján Svorada	Milan Kadlec	Ondřej Sosenka
1999	Tomáš Konečný	Milan Kadlec	František Trkal
2000	Miloslav Kejval	Milos Pejcha	Michal Kalenda
2001	Jaromir Friede	Jan Faltýnek	Petr Klasa
2002	Ondřej Fadrny	Tomáš Konečný	Ondřej Sosenka
2003	Lubor Tesař	Ondřej Fadrny	Adam Homolka
2004	Ondřej Sosenka	Petr Benčík	René Andrle
2005	Ján Svorada	Tomáš Bucháček	Stanislav Kozubek
2006	Stanislav Kozubek	Petr Pucelik	René Andrle
2007	Tomáš Bucháček	Tomáš Vokrouhlík	Petr Benčík
2008	Petr Benčík	Martin Hebík	Stanislav Kozubek
2009	Martin Mareš	Jakub Kratochvila	Stanislav Kozubek
2010	Petr Benčík	Stanislav Kozubek	Milan Kadlec
2011	Petr Benčík	Leopold König	Zdeněk Štybar
2012	Milan Kadlec	František Raboň	Jiří Polnický
2013	Jan Bárta	Martin Bína	Petr Lechner
2014	Zdeněk Štybar	Petr Vakoč	Jan Bárta
2015	Petr Vakoč	Leopold König	František Sisr
2016	Roman Kreuziger	Zdeněk Štybar	Martin Hunal
2017	Zdeněk Štybar	Josef Černý	Petr Vakoč
2018	Josef Černý	Jan Bárta	Jakub Otruba
2019	František Sisr	Tomáš Kalojíros	Petr Vakoč
2020	Adam Ťoupalík	Zdeněk Štybar	Petr Vakoč
2021	Michael Kukrle	Dominik Neumann	Daniel Turek
2022	Matěj Zahálka	Jan Bárta	Adam Ťoupalík
2023	Mathias Vacek	Pavel Bittner	Šimon Vaníček
2024	Tomáš Přidal	Michael Kukrle	Vojtech Kmínek

=== Under-23 ===
Year	Gold	Silver	Bronze
2003	Jan Bárta	Michal Kollert	Rostislav Lisník
2004	Martin Mareš	František Klouček	Zdeněk Štybar
2005	František Raboň	Pavel Zitta	Tomáš Míček
2006	Pavel Zitta	Jan Bárta	František Klouček
2007	Jakub Danačík	František Paďour	František Klouček
2008	Ondřej Zelinka	Zdeněk Křížek	Ondřej Bambula
2009	Jakub Kratochvíla	Jiří Šíbl	Zdeněk Křížek
2010	Jakub Kratochvíla	Lubomír Petruš	Karel Hník
2011	Jakub Novák	Petr Vakoč	David Dvorský
2012	Karel Hník	Michael Boroš	Petr Vakoč
2014	Tomáš Koudela	Daniel Turek	David Dvorský
2015	František Sisr	Josef Černý	Daniel Turek
2016	Michal Schlegel	Adam Ťoupalík	Jiří Šorm
2017	Roman Lehký	Luděk Lichnovský	Adam Ťoupalík
2018	Jakub Otruba	Adam Ťoupalík	Jan Rajchart
2019	Tomáš Bárta	Vojtěch Sedláček	František Honsa
2020	Vojtěch Řepa	Tomáš Jakoubek	Daniel Babor
2021	Daniel Babor	Tomáš Bárta	František Vinklárek
2022	Petr Kelemen	Jakub Ťoupalík	Jan Kašpar

== Women ==
Year	Gold	Silver	Bronze
1993	Julie Pekárková	Šárka Víchová	Renata Holová
1994	Lenka Těšíková	Karla Polívková	Julie Pekárková
1995	Šárka Víchová	Karla Polívková	Julie Pekárková
1996	Julie Pekárková	Šárka Víchová	Blanka Navrátilová
1997	Miluše Flašková	Šárka Víchová	Kristina Obručová
2000	Lada Kozlíková	Ilona Bublová	Karla Polívková
2001	Lada Kozlíková	Karla Polívková	Ilona Bublová
2002	Julie Pekárková	Zdenka Havlíková	Kristina Obručová
2003	Ilona Bublová	Julie Pekárková	Jana Kábrtová
2004	Martina Růžičková	Barbora Bohatá	Pavla Havlíková
2005	Lada Kozlíková		
2006	Lada Kozlíková	Pavla Havlíková	Martina Růžičková
2007	Martina Růžičková	Jarmila Machačová	Pavla Havlíková
2008	Martina Růžičková	Jarmila Machačová	Dana Fialová
2009	Tereza Huříková	Martina Růžičková	Jarmila Machačová
2010	Martina Sáblíková	Martina Růžičková	Lada Kozlíková
2011	Martina Sáblíková	Martina Růžičková	Jarmila Machačová
2012	Pavlína Šulcová	Martina Růžičková	Martina Sáblíková
2013	Martina Sáblíková	Pavlína Šulcová	Pavla Havlíková
2014	Martina Sáblíková	Anežka Drahotová	Pavlína Šulcová
2015	Martina Sáblíková	Zuzana Neckářová	Barbora Průdková
2016	Martina Sáblíková	Barbora Průdková	Martina Mikulášková
2017	Nikola Nosková	Lucie Hochmann	Jarmila Machačová
2018	Jarmila Machačová	Nikola Nosková	Melissa van Neck
2019	Tereza Neumanová	Nikola Bajgerová	Jarmila Machačová
2020	Jarmila Machačová	Tereza Neumanová	Nikola Bajgerová
2021	Tereza Neumanová	Nikola Bajgerová	Nikola Nosková
2022	Tereza Neumanová	Nikola Bajgerová	Kristýna Zemanová

== See also ==
- Czech National Time Trial Championships
- National Road Race Championships
