= 2017 Tour of Slovenia =

2017 UCI Europe Tour (2.1 race)

Race details
- Dates: 15–18 June
- Stages: 4
- Distance: 655.2 km (407.1 mi)
- Winning time: 15h 56' 23"

Results
Jersey awarded to the overall winner	Winner	(Poland) Rafał Majka	(Bora–Hansgrohe)
	Second	(Italy) Giovanni Visconti	(Bahrain–Merida)
	Third	(Australia) Jack Haig	(Orica–Scott)
Jersey awarded to the points classification winner	Points	(Republic of Ireland) Sam Bennett	(Bora–Hansgrohe)
Jersey awarded to the mountains classification winner	Mountains	(Poland) Rafał Majka	(Bora–Hansgrohe)
Jersey awarded to the young rider classification winner	Young rider	(Slovenia) Tadej Pogačar	(Rog–Ljubljana)
	Team	(Italy) Nippo–Vini Fantini	

The 2017 Tour of Slovenia (Slovene: Dirka po Sloveniji) was the 24th edition of the Tour of Slovenia categorized as 2.1 stage race (UCI Europe Tour), held between 15 and 18 June.

During this race, the Slovenian Tourist Board (STB) stepped in as the new lead partnership. Because of the STB, this tour was broadcast on Eurosport for the first time, bringing the sport to 120 countries around the world.

The 2017 Tour also changed the jersey colors worn by the race leader to green, reflecting Slovenia's commitment to sustainable tourism. This jersey symbolized the need for action and protection of the planet, and the role of the government, citizen, and tourist in that goal.

The race was decided on the race's queen stage, with the top-three stage placings taking the final podium positions. Rafał Majka (Bora–Hansgrohe) won both the general and mountains classification, by taking first place at the summit finish in Rogla. He won the race by seven seconds overall, from Bahrain–Merida's Giovanni Visconti, while a further ten seconds in arrears was Jack Haig of Orica–Scott; having finished second in 2016, Haig completed the podium in 2017.

The STB, wishing to showcase Slovenian culture and history, awarded a replica of the world's oldest wheel, discovered in Slovenia and dating back to 5,200 years ago, to each of the top 3 finishers. The replicas were created by the City museum of Ljubljana.

In the race's other classifications, Majka's teammate Sam Bennett won the points classification in a three-way tiebreak with Luka Mezgec (Orica–Scott) and Sonny Colbrelli (Bahrain–Merida), as Bennett won two stages during the race; Tadej Pogačar (Rog–Ljubljana) was the winner of the under-23 young rider classification in fifth place overall, while Nippo–Vini Fantini were the winners of the teams classification.

== Teams ==
Total 147 riders (133 finished it) from 19 teams (initially only eighteen), but a 19th team – Amplatz–BMC – was added a month before the race.

UCI WorldTeams

- Bahrain–Merida
- Bora–Hansgrohe
- Team Dimension Data
- Orica–Scott
- UAE Team Emirates

UCI Professional Continental teams

- Gazprom–RusVelo
- Nippo–Vini Fantini
- Wilier Triestina–Selle Italia
- Androni–Sidermec–Bottecchia

UCI Continental teams

- Adria Mobil
- Amplatz–BMC
- Elkov–Author
- Hrinkow Advarics Cycleang
- Meridiana–Kamen
- Rog–Ljubljana
- Sangemini–MG.K Vis
- Synergy Baku
- Tirol Cycling Team

National teams

- Slovenia

== Route and stages ==
Stage characteristics and winners
Stage	Date	Course	Distance	Type	Winner
1	15 June	Koper – Kočevje	159.4 km (99 mi)	Intermediate stage	(Republic of Ireland) Sam Bennett
2	16 June	Ljubljana – Ljubljana	169.9 km (106 mi)	Intermediate stage	(Slovenia) Luka Mezgec
3	17 June	Celje – Rogla	167.7 km (104 mi)	Mountain stage	(Poland) Rafał Majka
4	18 June	Rogaška Slatina – Novo Mesto	158.2 km (98 mi)	Intermediate stage	(Republic of Ireland) Sam Bennett
Total		655.2 km (407.1 mi)			

=== Stage 1 ===
15 June 2017 — Koper to Kočevje, 159.4 km (99.0 mi)

Rank	Rider	Team	Time
Official results
1	(Republic of Ireland) Sam Bennett	Bora–Hansgrohe	3h 49' 46"
2	(Italy) Sonny Colbrelli	Bahrain–Merida	+ 0"
3	(Slovenia) Luka Mezgec	Orica–Scott	+ 0"
4	(Italy) Roberto Ferrari	UAE Team Emirates	+ 0"
5	(Italy) Marco Canola	Nippo–Vini Fantini	+ 0"
6	(Slovenia) Rok Korošec	Amplatz–BMC	+ 0"
7	(Serbia) Dušan Rajović	Adria Mobil	+ 0"
8	(Italy) Andrea Palini	Androni–Sidermec–Bottecchia	+ 0"
9	(Poland) Rafał Majka	Bora–Hansgrohe	+ 0"
10	(United Kingdom) Mark Cavendish	Team Dimension Data	+ 0"
General classification after the stage
1	(Republic of Ireland) Sam Bennett	Bora–Hansgrohe	3h 49' 36"
2	(Italy) Sonny Colbrelli	Bahrain–Merida	+ 4"
3	(Slovenia) Žiga Jerman	Rog–Ljubljana	+ 4"
4	(Slovenia) Luka Mezgec	Orica–Scott	+ 6"
5	(Italy) Nicola Bagioli	Nippo–Vini Fantini	+ 7"
6	(Czech Republic) Tomáš Bucháček	Elkov–Author	+ 8"
7	(Italy) Roberto Ferrari	UAE Team Emirates	+ 10"
8	(Italy) Marco Canola	Nippo–Vini Fantini	+ 10"
9	(Slovenia) Rok Korošec	Amplatz–BMC	+ 10"
10	(Serbia) Dušan Rajović	Adria Mobil	+ 10"

=== Stage 2 ===
16 June 2017 — Ljubljana to Ljubljana, 169.9 km (105.6 mi)

Rank	Rider	Team	Time
Official results
1	(Slovenia) Luka Mezgec	Orica–Scott	3h 50' 51"
2	(Italy) Roberto Ferrari	UAE Team Emirates	+ 0"
3	(Australia) Mark Renshaw	Team Dimension Data	+ 0"
4	(Czech Republic) Alois Kaňkovský	Elkov–Author	+ 0"
5	(Czech Republic) Jiří Polnický	Elkov–Author	+ 0"
6	(Italy) Andrea Palini	Androni–Sidermec–Bottecchia	+ 0"
7	(Italy) Sonny Colbrelli	Bahrain–Merida	+ 0"
8	(Italy) Marco Canola	Nippo–Vini Fantini	+ 0"
9	(Slovenia) Rok Korošec	Amplatz–BMC	+ 0"
10	(South Africa) Ryan Gibbons	Team Dimension Data	+ 0"
General classification after the stage
1	(Slovenia) Luka Mezgec	Orica–Scott	7h 40' 23"
2	(Republic of Ireland) Sam Bennett	Bora–Hansgrohe	+ 4"
3	(Italy) Roberto Ferrari	UAE Team Emirates	+ 8"
4	(Italy) Sonny Colbrelli	Bahrain–Merida	+ 8"
5	(Slovenia) Žiga Jerman	Rog–Ljubljana	+ 8"
6	(Australia) Mark Renshaw	Team Dimension Data	+ 10"
7	(Czech Republic) Tomáš Bucháček	Elkov–Author	+ 10"
8	(Italy) Nicola Bagioli	Nippo–Vini Fantini	+ 11"
9	(Italy) Ivan Santaromita	Nippo–Vini Fantini	+ 13"
10	(Italy) Marco Canola	Nippo–Vini Fantini	+ 14"

=== Stage 3 ===
17 June 2017 — Celje to Rogla, 167.7 km (104.2 mi)

Rank	Rider	Team	Time
Official results
1	(Poland) Rafał Majka	Bora–Hansgrohe	4h 34' 08"
2	(Italy) Giovanni Visconti	Bahrain–Merida	+ 3"
3	(Australia) Jack Haig	Orica–Scott	+ 11"
4	(Austria) Gregor Mühlberger	Bora–Hansgrohe	+ 25"
5	(Slovenia) Tadej Pogačar	Rog–Ljubljana	+ 36"
6	(Austria) Hermann Pernsteiner	Amplatz–BMC	+ 38"
7	(Italy) Mattia Cattaneo	Androni–Sidermec–Bottecchia	+ 58"
8	(Poland) Paweł Cieślik	Elkov–Author	+ 1' 03"
9	(Italy) Ivan Santaromita	Nippo–Vini Fantini	+ 1' 05"
10	(Italy) Edward Ravasi	UAE Team Emirates	+ 1' 21"
General classification after the stage
1	(Poland) Rafał Majka	Bora–Hansgrohe	12h 14' 35"
2	(Italy) Giovanni Visconti	Bahrain–Merida	+ 7"
3	(Australia) Jack Haig	Orica–Scott	+ 17"
4	(Austria) Gregor Mühlberger	Bora–Hansgrohe	+ 35"
5	(Slovenia) Tadej Pogačar	Rog–Ljubljana	+ 46"
6	(Austria) Hermann Pernsteiner	Amplatz–BMC	+ 48"
7	(Italy) Mattia Cattaneo	Androni–Sidermec–Bottecchia	+ 1' 08"
8	(Poland) Paweł Cieślik	Elkov–Author	+ 1' 13"
9	(Italy) Ivan Santaromita	Nippo–Vini Fantini	+ 1' 14"
10	(Italy) Edward Ravasi	UAE Team Emirates	+ 1' 31"

=== Stage 4 ===
18 June 2017 — Rogaška Slatina to Novo mesto, 158.2 km (98.3 mi)

Rank	Rider	Team	Time
Official results
1	(Republic of Ireland) Sam Bennett	Bora–Hansgrohe	3h 41' 48"
2	(United Kingdom) Mark Cavendish	Team Dimension Data	+ 0"
3	(Italy) Sonny Colbrelli	Bahrain–Merida	+ 0"
4	(Italy) Jakub Mareczko	Wilier Triestina–Selle Italia	+ 0"
5	(Italy) Roberto Ferrari	UAE Team Emirates	+ 0"
6	(Italy) Andrea Palini	Androni–Sidermec–Bottecchia	+ 0"
7	(Slovenia) Luka Mezgec	Orica–Scott	+ 0"
8	(Slovenia) Rok Korošec	Amplatz–BMC	+ 0"
9	(Italy) Marco Canola	Nippo–Vini Fantini	+ 0"
10	(Slovenia) Žiga Jerman	Rog–Ljubljana	+ 0"

== Classification leadership ==
Points for the mountains classification
Position	1	2	3	4	5
Points for Category 1	12	8	6	4	2
Points for Category 2	6	4	2	0	
Points for Category 3	3	2	1	0	

In the 2017 Tour of Slovenia, four different jerseys were awarded. The general classification was calculated by adding each cyclist's finishing times on each stage, and allowing time bonuses for the first three finishers at intermediate sprints (three seconds to first, two seconds to second and one second to third) and at the finish of mass-start stages; these were awarded to the first three finishers on all stages: the stage winner won a ten-second bonus, with six and four seconds for the second and third riders respectively. The leader of the classification received a green jersey; it was considered the most important of the 2017 Tour of Slovenia, and the winner of the classification was considered the winner of the race.

Additionally, there was a points classification, which awarded a red jersey. In the points classification, cyclists received points for finishing in the top 15 in a stage. For winning a stage, a rider earned 25 points, with 20 for second, 16 for third, 14 for fourth, 12 for fifth, 10 for sixth and a point fewer per place down to 1 point for 15th place. Points towards the classification could also be accrued – awarded on a 5–3–1 scale – at intermediate sprint points during each stage; these intermediate sprints also offered bonus seconds towards the general classification as noted above.

There was also a mountains classification, the leadership of which was marked by a blue jersey. In the mountains classification, points towards the classification were won by reaching the top of a climb before other cyclists. Each climb was categorised as either first, second, or third-category, with more points available for the higher-categorised climbs. The fourth and final jersey represented the classification for young riders, marked by a white jersey. This was decided the same way as the general classification, but only riders born after 1 January 1995 were eligible to be ranked in the classification. There was also a classification for teams, in which the times of the best three cyclists per team on each stage were added together; the leading team at the end of the race was the team with the lowest total time.

Best young rider (under 23 years) by time was awarded with white jersey.

Classification leadership by stage
Stage	Winner	General classification	Points classification	Mountains classification	Young rider classification	Team classification
1	Sam Bennett	Sam Bennett	Sam Bennett	Luca Pacioni	Žiga Jerman	Bora–Hansgrohe
2	Luka Mezgec	Luka Mezgec	Luka Mezgec	Luca Pacioni	Žiga Jerman	UAE Team Emirates
3	Rafał Majka	Rafał Majka	Luka Mezgec	Rafał Majka	Tadej Pogačar	Nippo–Vini Fantini
4	Sam Bennett	Rafał Majka	Sam Bennett	Rafał Majka	Tadej Pogačar	Nippo–Vini Fantini
Final		Rafał Majka	Sam Bennett	Rafał Majka	Tadej Pogačar	Nippo–Vini Fantini

== Final classification standings ==
Legend
General classification	Denotes the winner of the General classification	Points classification	Denotes the winner of the Points classification
Mountains classification	Denotes the winner of the Mountains classification	Young rider classification	Denotes the winner of the Young rider classification

=== General classification ===
Rank	Rider	Team	Time
1	(Poland) Rafał Majka	Bora–Hansgrohe	15h 56' 23"
2	(Italy) Giovanni Visconti	Bahrain–Merida	+ 7"
3	(Australia) Jack Haig	Orica–Scott	+ 17"
4	(Austria) Gregor Mühlberger	Bora–Hansgrohe	+ 35"
5	(Slovenia) Tadej Pogačar	Rog–Ljubljana	+ 46"
6	(Austria) Hermann Pernsteiner	Amplatz–BMC	+ 48"
7	(Italy) Mattia Cattaneo	Androni–Sidermec–Bottecchia	+ 1' 08"
8	(Poland) Paweł Cieślik	Elkov–Author	+ 1' 13"
9	(Italy) Ivan Santaromita	Nippo–Vini Fantini	+ 1' 14"
10	(Italy) Edward Ravasi	UAE Team Emirates	+ 1' 31"

=== Points classification ===
Rank	Rider	Team	Points
1	(Republic of Ireland) Sam Bennett	Bora–Hansgrohe	50
2	(Slovenia) Luka Mezgec	Orica–Scott	50
3	(Italy) Sonny Colbrelli	Bahrain–Merida	50
4	(Italy) Roberto Ferrari	UAE Team Emirates	46
5	(Poland) Rafał Majka	Bora–Hansgrohe	33
6	(Italy) Andrea Palini	Androni Giocattoli–Sidermec	28
7	(Italy) Marco Canola	Nippo–Vini Fantini	27
8	(United Kingdom) Mark Cavendish	Team Dimension Data	26
9	(Slovenia) Rok Korošec	Amplatz–BMC	25
10	(Italy) Giovanni Visconti	Bahrain–Merida	20

=== Mountains classification ===
Rank	Rider	Team	Points
1	(Poland) Rafał Majka	Bora–Hansgrohe	12
2	(Italy) Giovanni Visconti	Bahrain–Merida	8
3	(Slovenia) Žiga Grošelj	Adria Mobil	7
4	(Australia) Jack Haig	Orica–Scott	6
5	(Italy) Manuel Belletti	Wilier Triestina–Selle Italia	6
6	(Italy) Luca Pacioni	Androni Giocattoli–Sidermec	6
7	(Austria) Gregor Mühlberger	Bora–Hansgrohe	4
8	(Italy) Enrico Salvador	Tirol Cycling Team	4
9	(Czech Republic) Tomáš Bucháček	Elkov–Author	4
10	(Slovenia) Žiga Jerman	Rog–Ljubljana	4

=== Young rider classification ===
Rank	Rider	Team	Points
1	(Slovenia) Tadej Pogačar	Rog–Ljubljana	15h 57' 09"
2	(Slovenia) Domen Novak	Bahrain–Merida	+ 2' 30"
3	(Slovenia) Izidor Penko	Rog–Ljubljana	+ 3' 39"
4	(Colombia) Daniel Martínez	Wilier Triestina–Selle Italia	+ 9' 31"
5	(Italy) Nicola Bagioli	Nippo–Vini Fantini	+ 15' 33"
6	(Slovenia) Žiga Ručigaj	Rog–Ljubljana	+ 21' 44"
7	(Slovenia) Gorazd Per	Adria Mobil	+ 22' 36"
8	(Slovenia) Žiga Jerman	Rog–Ljubljana	+ 23' 42"
9	(Slovenia) Žiga Jerman	Adria Mobil	+ 23' 48"
10	(Slovenia) Luka Čotar	Slovenia	+ 23' 48"

=== Team classification ===
Rank	Team	Time
1	(Italy) Nippo–Vini Fantini	47h 55' 44"
2	(Italy) Sangemini–MG.K Vis	+ 53"
3	(Italy) Androni Giocattoli–Sidermec	+ 3' 34"
4	(Russia) Gazprom–RusVelo	+ 5' 16"
5	Bahrain–Merida	+ 11' 04"
6	(Italy) Wilier Triestina–Selle Italia	+ 11' 13"
7	(Czech Republic) Elkov–Author	+ 12' 46"
8	(Austria) Amplatz–BMC	+ 14' 02"
9	(Australia) Orica–Scott	+ 14' 17"
10	(Germany) Bora–Hansgrohe	+ 14' 21"
