= Michal Schlegel =

Czech cyclist (b. 1995)

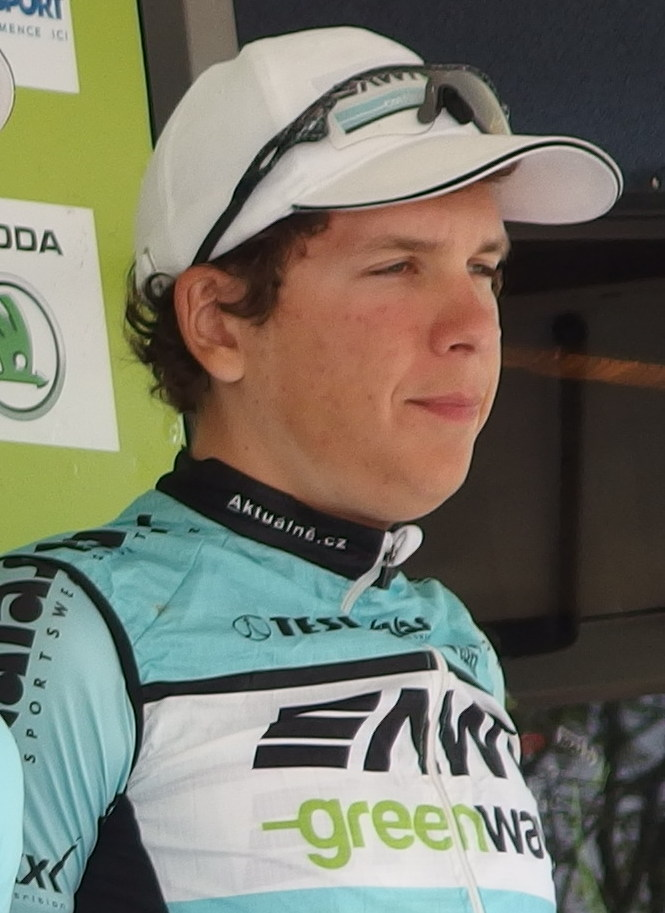
- Schlegel in 2015.

Personal information
- Full name: Michal Schlegel
- Born: 31 May 1995 (age 31) Ústí nad Orlicí, Czech Republic
- Height: 1.84 m (6 ft 0 in)

Cycling career
- Sport: Cycling
- Current team: Kasper Crypto4me
- Discipline: Road
- Role: Rider

Amateur team
- 2014: TJ Favorit Brno

Professional teams
- 2015–2016: AWT–GreenWay
- 2017–2018: CCC–Sprandi–Polkowice
- 2019–2021: Elkov–Author
- 2022–2024: Caja Rural–Seguros RGA
- 2025–: Elkov–Kasper

Michal Schlegel (born 31 May 1995 in Ústí nad Orlicí) is a Czech cyclist, who currently rides for UCI Continental team Kasper Crypto4me. He was named in the start list for the 2017 Giro d'Italia.

== Major results ==
2013
1st Time trial, National Junior Road Championships
2014
2nd Time trial, National Under-23 Road Championships
4th Grand Prix Královéhradeckého kraje
2015
1st Young rider classification Troféu Joaquim Agostinho
3rd Time trial, National Under-23 Road Championships
3rd Overall East Bohemia Tour

1st Young rider classification

6th Overall Czech Cycling Tour

1st Young rider classification

7th Road race, UCI Under-23 Road World Championships
10th Overall Giro della Valle d'Aosta
2016
National Under-23 Road Championships

1st Road race
1st Time trial

2nd Gran Premio Palio del Recioto
8th Overall Tour de l'Avenir
8th Overall Czech Cycling Tour

1st Young rider classification

2017
3rd Overall Grand Prix Priessnitz spa
6th Overall Tour de l'Avenir
7th Overall Tour of Croatia

1st Young rider classification

9th Overall Czech Cycling Tour

1st Young rider classification

2018
6th GP Hungary
2019
2nd Overall Tour Alsace

1st Stage 3

National Road Championships

4th Road race
4th Time trial

6th Overall Istrian Spring Trophy
6th Overall Sibiu Cycling Tour
8th Overall Tour of Bihor
2021
1st Overall Tour of Małopolska

1st Stage 1

1st GP Hungary
3rd Overall Sibiu Cycling Tour
3rd Overall Oberösterreich Rundfahrt

1st Points classification
1st Stage 2

3rd GP Slovenia
2023
Combativity award Stage 19 Vuelta a España

=== Grand Tour general classification results timeline ===
Grand Tour	2017	2018	2019	2020	2021	2022	2023
Giro d'Italia	45	—	—	—	—	—	—
Tour de France	—	—	—	—	—	—	—
Vuelta a España	—	—	—	—	—	—	114

Legend
—	Did not compete
DNF	Did not finish
