= Martin Hunal =

Czech bicycle racer

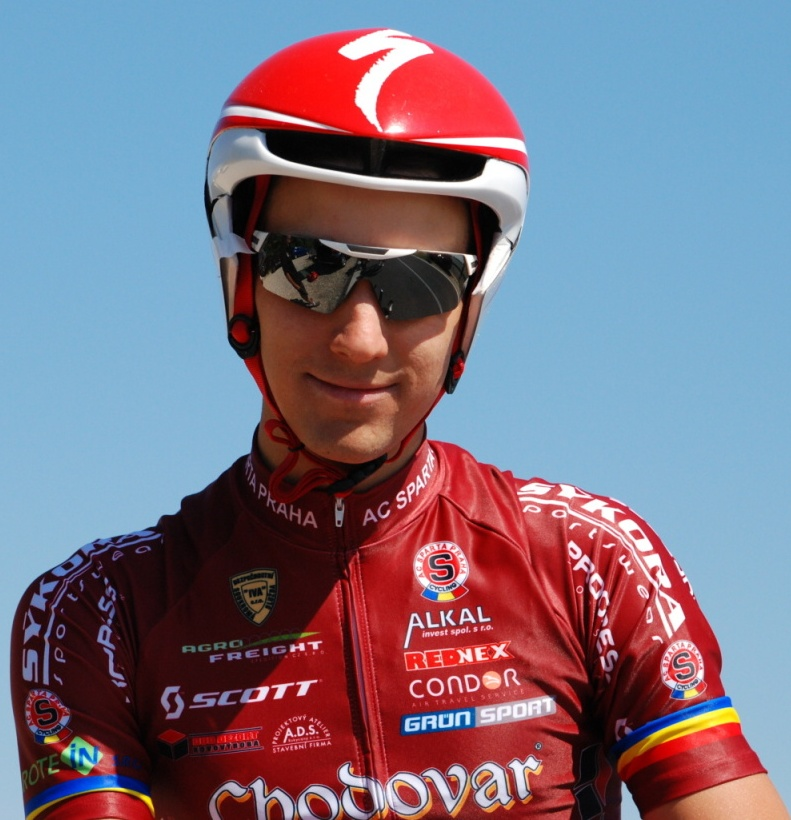
- Hunal, as a member of the AC Sparta Praha team.

Personal information
- Full name: Martin Hunal
- Born: 8 September 1989 (age 37) Rynárec, Czech SR, Czechoslovakia (now Czech Republic)

Cycling career
- Sport: Cycling
- Disciplines: Road; Cyclo-cross
- Role: Rider

Amateur team
- 2018: Cyklo Team Tábor

Professional teams
- 2011–2013: AC Sparta Praha
- 2014–2017: Bauknecht–Author

Martin Hunal (born 8 September 1989) is a Czech former professional cyclist, who rode professionally for the AC Sparta Praha and Elkov–Author teams between 2011 and 2017.

== Major results ==
2011
3rd Ronde van Overijssel
8th Overall Course de la Solidarité Olympique
2012
3rd Overall An Post Rás
5th Tour Bohemia
2013
1st Mountains classification Okolo Jižních Čech
7th Overall An Post Rás

1st Mountains classification

7th Tour Bohemia
2014
4th Visegrad 4 Bicycle Race – GP Czech Republic
5th Visegrad 4 Bicycle Race – GP Slovakia
7th Grand Prix Královéhradeckého kraje
8th Overall Course de la Solidarité Olympique
2015
7th Visegrad 4 Bicycle Race – GP Czech Republic
2016
3rd Road race, National Road Championships
3rd Memoriał Romana Siemińskiego
8th Overall Dookoła Mazowsza
2017
1st Stage 1 (TTT) Czech Cycling Tour
