= Daniel Babor =

Czech cyclist

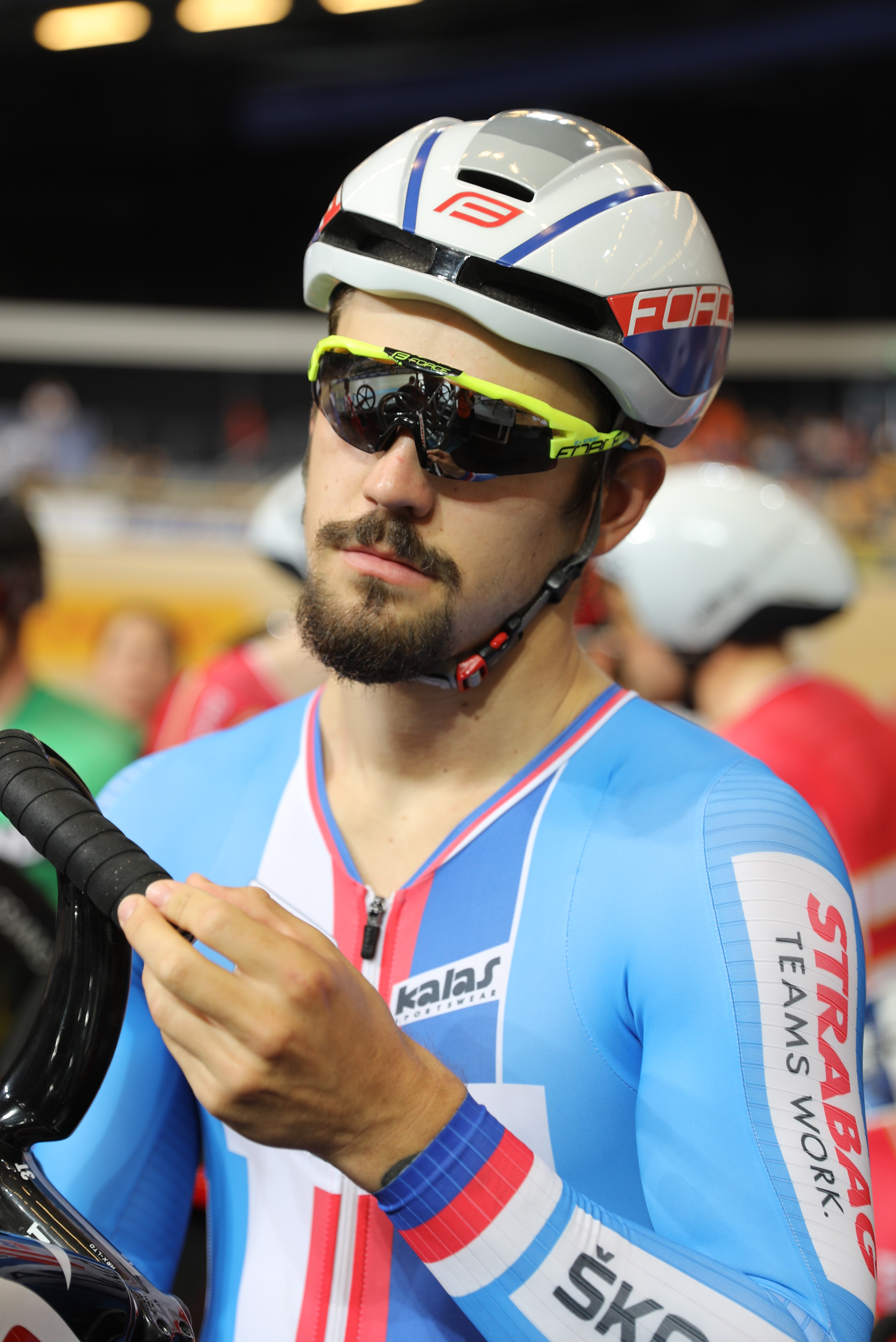
- Babor in 2019

Personal information
- Full name: Daniel Babor
- Born: 22 October 1999 (age 26) Beroun, Czech Republic
- Height: 1.79 m (5 ft 10 in)
- Weight: 78 kg (172 lb)

Cycling career
- Sport: Cycling
- Disciplines: Road; Track
- Role: Rider
- Rider type: Sprinter

Professional teams
- 2018–2021: Pardus–TUFO Prostějov
- 2022: Elkov–Kasper
- 2023–2025: Caja Rural–Seguros RGA

Daniel Babor (born 22 October 1999) is a former Czech professional racing cyclist, who most recently rode for UCI ProTeam Caja Rural–Seguros RGA. He rode in the men's scratch event at the 2020 UCI Track Cycling World Championships in Berlin, Germany.

== Major results ==
=== Road ===
2017
1st Stages 1 & 2b Internationale Cottbuser Junioren-Etappenfahrt
2020
3rd Road race, National Under-23 Road Championships
8th Puchar Ministra Obrony Narodowej
2021
1st Road race, National Under-23 Road Championships
1st Stage 4 Tour of Romania
2022
1st Stages 2 & 5 Tour of Romania
Tour du Loir-et-Cher

Points classification
1st Stage 1

3rd Grand Prix Wyszków
3rd GP Gorenjska
7th Grand Prix Poland
7th Ronde van de Achterhoek
2023
1st Stage 4 Tour de Langkawi
1st Stage 4 Volta a Portugal
8th Trofeo Palma
2024
1st Stage 3 Volta ao Alentejo
8th Trofeo Palma

=== Track ===
2016
National Junior Track Championships

1st Individual pursuit
1st Team pursuit (with Vaclav Kocarík, Tomáš Bárta & Jan Cink)
1st Points Race
1st Scratch
1st Omnium

2nd Scratch, UCI World Junior Track Championships
2017
1st Scratch, UCI World Junior Track Championships
UEC European Junior Track Championships

1st Scratch
2nd Madison

National Junior Track Championships

1st Individual pursuit
1st Points Race
1st Scratch

2018
National Track Championships

1st Madison (with Luděk Lichnovský)
1st Omnium

2019
2nd Scratch, UEC European Under-23 Track Championships
2020
National Track Championships

1st Madison (with René Smekal)
1st Omnium

2021
National Track Championships

1st Points race
1st Omnium
1st Elimination race

UEC European Under-23 Track Championships

3rd Scratch
3rd Omnium
