= Paweł Cieślik =

Polish cyclist

Personal information
- Full name: Paweł Cieślik
- Born: 12 April 1986 (age 40) Poznań, Poland
- Height: 1.76 m (5 ft 9 in)
- Weight: 65 kg (143 lb)

Cycling career
- Sport: Cycling
- Current team: Retired
- Discipline: Road
- Role: Rider

Professional teams
- 2009–2010: Mróz Continental Team
- 2011–2013: Bank BGŻ
- 2014–2015: Bauknecht–Author
- 2016: Verva ActiveJet
- 2017: Elkov–Author
- 2018: CCC–Sprandi–Polkowice
- 2019: Wibatech Merx 7R
- 2020–2022: Voster ATS Team

Paweł Cieślik (born 12 April 1986 in Poznań) is a Polish former cyclist, who competed as a professional from 2009 to 2022.

== Major results ==
2003
7th Overall Peace Race Juniors
2007
3rd Giro del Canavese
2010
2nd National Hill Climb Championships
2011
3rd National Hill Climb Championships
5th Overall Tour of Małopolska
5th Memoriał Henryka Łasaka
6th Puchar Ministra Obrony Narodowej
10th Overall Okolo Slovenska

1st Stage 4

2012
1st Stage 7 Bałtyk–Karkonosze Tour
2nd Overall Tour of Małopolska

1st Stage 2

2013
1st Stage 8 Bałtyk–Karkonosze Tour
2nd Overall Tour of Małopolska
3rd Memoriał Henryka Łasaka
6th Overall Okolo Jižních Čech
2014
1st Grand Prix Královéhradeckého kraje
2nd Overall Okolo Jižních Čech
3rd Overall Tour of Małopolska
3rd Overall Oberösterreich Rundfahrt

1st Stage 2

7th Overall Szlakiem Grodów Piastowskich
9th Tour Bohemia
2015
2nd Overall East Bohemia Tour
3rd Overall Okolo Slovenska
4th Memoriał Henryka Łasaka
5th Overall Czech Cycling Tour
6th Overall Szlakiem Grodów Piastowskich
6th Overall Black Sea Cycling Tour
2016
5th Velothon Wales
8th Visegrad 4 Bicycle Race – GP Czech Republic
2017
1st Stage 1 (TTT) Czech Cycling Tour
2nd Overall Course de Solidarność et des Champions Olympiques
5th Overall East Bohemia Tour
6th Visegrad 4 Bicycle Race – GP Czech Republic
7th Memoriał Romana Siemińskiego
8th Overall Tour of Slovenia
2018
2nd Overall Tour of Małopolska
3rd Overall Bałtyk–Karkonosze Tour

1st Mountains classification

2019
2nd Road race, National Road Championships
9th Memoriał Andrzeja Trochanowskiego
9th Korona Kocich Gór
10th Overall Tour of Małopolska
2020
10th Overall Tour of Bulgaria
10th Overall Tour of Małopolska
2021
2nd Overall Tour of Małopolska
2nd Overall In the Steps of Romans
7th Overall Tour de Hongrie
2022
2nd Memoriał Jana Magiery
5th Road race, National Road Championships
10th Overall Tour of Małopolska
