= Křížek =

Křížek (feminine Křížková) is a Czech surname. Notable people with the surname include:

- Erin Krizek, American military officer
- Matthias Krizek (born 1988), Austrian cyclist
- Milan Křížek (1926–2018), Czech composer, music teacher and viola player
- Paul Krizek (born 1961), American politician
- Zdeněk Křížek (born 1983), Czech footballer
