= Zahalka =

Zahalka is a European surname of Slavic origin. Notable people with the surname include:

- Anne Zahalka (born 1957), Australian photographer
- Jamal Zahalka (born 1955), Israeli politician
- Milan Zahálka (born 1977), Czech footballer
- Matej Zahálka (born 1993), Czech cyclist
