= René Andrle =

Czech cyclist

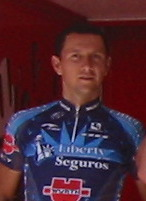
- Andrle in 2005

Personal information
- Born: 1 April 1974 (age 52) Litoměřice, Czechoslovakia

Cycling career
- Sport: Cycling
- Current team: PSK Whirlpool Hradec Kralove
- Discipline: Road
- Role: Rider

Professional teams
- 1999–2000: Wüstenrot-ZVVZ
- 2001–2003: ONCE-Eroski
- 2004–2005: Liberty Seguros
- 2006–2008: PSK Whirlpool

René Andrle (born 1 April 1974 in Litoměřice) is a Czech former professional road bicycle racer.

== Biography ==
At first Andrle wanted to be a hockey player but soon realized he had potential as a cyclist. At ten years old he was sent to a special cycling school to develop his talents. In 1995 Andrle won the Czech National Road Race Championship.

In 2000 he joined the Wüstenrot-ZVVZ team. He played two seasons with them before joining ONCE-Eroski in 2001, and Liberty Seguros in 2004. He participated at the 2004 Summer Olympics where he placed 55th overall in road cycling. He is currently one of the Sport Directors for NSN Cycling Team.

== Major results ==
1995
Czech Republic Road Race Champion
1996
2nd, Czech Republic Road Race
1997
1st, Stage 6, Tour of Austria
1999
1st, Stage 3, Ytong Bohemia Tour
2000
1st, Overall, Tour of Slovakia
Winner Stage 5 (ITT)
2001
62nd, Overall, Giro d'Italia
3rd, Prologue
2002
1st, Stage 5, Vuelta a Murcia
2004
3rd, Czech Republic Road Race
2006
1st, Stage 6, Dookoła Mazowsza
3rd, Czech Republic Road Race
2007
2nd, Czech Republic Road Race
