= Tomáš Konečný =

Czech cyclist

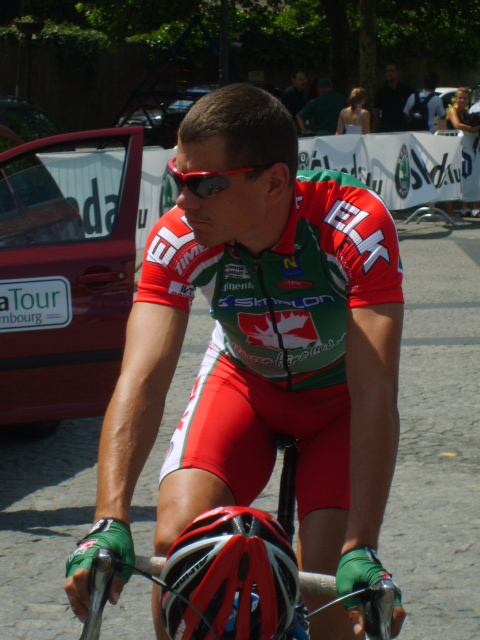

Personal information
- Born: 11 October 1973 (age 53) Olomouc, Czechoslovakia
- Height: 1.78 m (5 ft 10 in)
- Weight: 67 kg (148 lb)

Cycling career
- Sport: Cycling
- Current team: Tufo–Pardus Prostějov
- Discipline: Road
- Role: Rider (retired); Directeur sportif

Professional teams
- 1996: Husqvarna–ZVVZ
- 1997–2000: ZVVZ–Giant–AIS
- 2001–2002: Domo–Farm Frites–Latexco
- 2003: Ed' System ZVVZ
- 2004–2005: T-Mobile Team
- 2006: Wiesenhof–AKUD
- 2007: Elk Haus–Simplon

Managerial team
- 2015–: SKC TUFO Prostějov

Tomáš Konečný (born 11 October 1973) is a Czech former racing cyclist, who competed at the 2000 Summer Olympics. He currently works as a directeur sportif for UCI Continental team Tufo–Pardus Prostějov.

== Major results ==
1996
1st Stage 4 Commonwealth Bank Classic
1st Stage 6 Sachsen Tour
1997
2nd GP Kranj
3rd Road race, National Road Championships
1998
1st Overall Volta ao Algarve

1st Stages 3 & 6

1st Stage 6 Tour de Beauce
3rd Philadelphia International Cycling Classic
1999
1st Road race, National Road Championships
1st Stage 2 Vuelta a La Rioja
2nd Overall Herald Sun Tour

1st Stages 7 & 11

2000
1st Poreč Trophy 5
1st Overall Tour de Beauce

1st Prologue

2001
1st Stage 16 Vuelta a España
9th Road race, UCI Road World Championships
2002
2nd Road race, National Road Championships
6th Milan–San Remo
2003
2nd Overall Jadranska Magistrala

1st Stage 3

2nd Overall Niedersachsen-Rundfahrt

1st Stage 4

3rd Overall Peace Race

1st Stage 8

3rd Overall Tour de Beauce

1st Stage 4
