= Nuno Marta =

Portuguese cyclist

Personal information
- Full name: Nuño Duarte Silva Marta
- Born: 28 November 1976 (age 49) Torres Vedras, Portugal

Cycling career
- Sport: Cycling
- Current team: Retired
- Discipline: Road
- Role: Rider

Professional teams
- 1999–2000: Maia–CIN
- 2001: Gresco–Tavira
- 2002–2003: Barbot–Torrie
- 2004: Würth–Atum Bom Petisco–Tavira
- 2005: Riberalves–GoldNutrition
- 2006: Imoholding–Loulé Jardim Hotel
- 2007: Madeinox–BRIC–Loule
- 2008–2009: Centro Ciclismo de Loulé

Nuño Duarte Silva Marta (born 28 November 1976) is a Portuguese former road cyclist. He competed in the men's individual road race at the 1996 Summer Olympics.

== Major results ==
2001
1st Road race, National Road Championships
2003
1st Overall GP CTT Correios de Portugal

1st Stage 1

2007
1st Overall Vuelta a Extremadura

1st Stage 3
