= Ondřej Fadrny =

Czech bicycle racer

Personal information
- Born: 25 September 1978 (age 48) Brno, Czech Republic

Cycling career
- Sport: Cycling
- Current team: Retired
- Discipline: Road
- Role: Rider

Amateur team
- 2000–2001: GS MG Boy's-Aqua Mema

Professional teams
- 2001: Linda McCartney–Jacob’s Creek–Jaguar
- 2002: De Nardi–Pasta Montegrappa
- 2003: De Nardi–Colpack
- 2004–2005: PSK Whirlpool

Major wins
- One-day races and Classics National Road Race Championships (2002)

Ondřej Fadrny (born 25 September 1978) is a Czech former cyclist, who last rode for PSK Whirlpool.

== Major results ==
1997
2nd road race, National Road Championships
1998
10th road race, European Under-23 Road Championships
1999
1st stage 1 Tour de Bohême
5th road race, European Under-23 Road Championships
2000
1st Memorial Guido Zamperioli
3rd overall Okolo Slovenska
8th road race, European Under-23 Road Championships
2001
1st Medaglia d'Oro Fiera di Sommacampagna
2002
1st road race, National Road Championships
2003
2nd road race, National Road Championships
2004
1st overall Tour of Małopolska

1st stage 1

2005
2nd Memoriał Henryka Łasaka
