= Tomáš Bárta =

Czech cyclist (born 1999)

Personal information
- Born: 28 April 1999 (age 27) Olomouc, Czech Republic
- Height: 1.88 m (6 ft 2 in)
- Weight: 77 kg (170 lb)

Cycling career
- Sport: Cycling
- Current team: Epronex–Hungary Cycling Team
- Disciplines: Road; Track
- Role: Rider
- Rider type: Sprinter

Professional teams
- 2018–2020: Pardus–TUFO Prostějov
- 2021–2022: Topforex–ATT Investments
- 2023–2024: Caja Rural–Seguros RGA
- 2025–: Epronex–Hungary Cycling Team

Tomáš Bárta (born 28 April 1999) is a Czech racing cyclist, who rides for UCI Continental team Epronex–Hungary Cycling Team.

== Major results ==
2019
1st Road race, National Under-23 Road Championships
3rd V4 Special Series Debrecen–Ibrany
7th Memoriał Henryka Łasaka
2020
7th GP Kranj
10th Puchar Ministra Obrony Narodowej
2021
2nd Road race, National Under-23 Road Championships
3rd Trofej Umag
5th Overall Dookoła Mazowsza
6th GP Slovenian Istria
8th Overall Baltic Chain Tour
8th Overall Okolo Jižních Čech
8th Fyen Rundt
10th Overall Course de Solidarność et des Champions Olympiques
10th Puchar Ministra Obrony Narodowej
2022
2nd Overall Gemenc Grand Prix

1st Stage 2

2nd Trofej Umag
2nd Grand Prix Poland
2nd GP Kranj
4th GP Slovenian Istria
4th Grand Prix Nasielsk-Serock
6th Overall Dookoła Mazowsza
6th Trofej Poreč
9th Memorial Philippe Van Coningsloo
2023
4th Road race, National Road Championships
2024

15th Ronde van Limburg 4th Stage Volta ao Alentejo 16th Trofeo Ses Salines 1st Czech National Track Champion Madison

2025

3rd Stage Wyscig Solidarnosći 3rd Czech National Track Championship Scratch Race 3rd Czech National Track Championships Individual pursuit
