= Michael Kukrle =

Czech cyclist

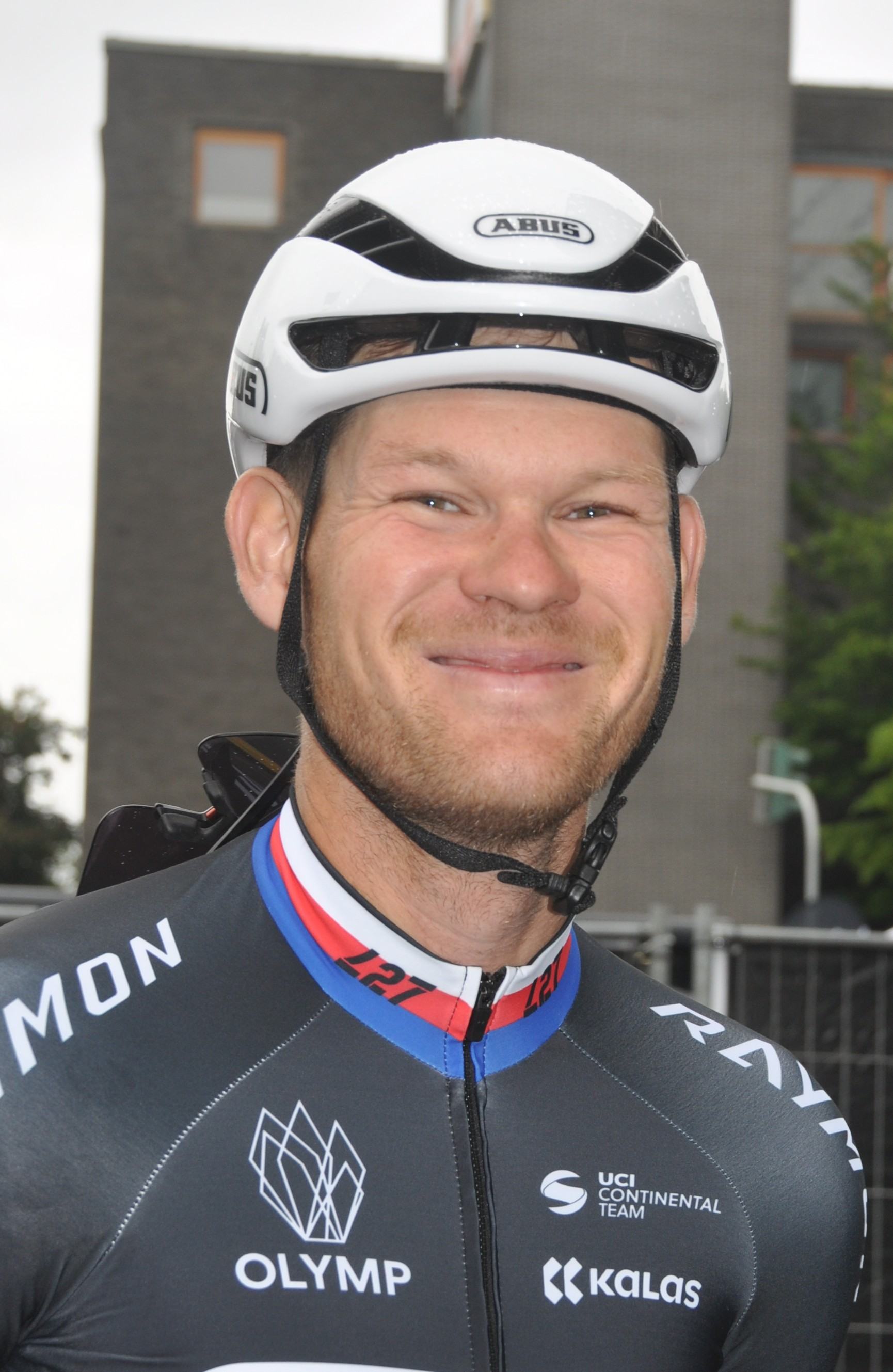
- Kukrle at the 2026 Rund um Köln

Personal information
- Born: 17 November 1994 (age 31) Mohelnice, Czech Republic
- Height: 1.83 m (6 ft 0 in)
- Weight: 75 kg (165 lb)

Cycling career
- Sport: Cycling
- Current team: Team Felt–Felbermayr
- Discipline: Road
- Role: Rider
- Rider type: Time trialist

Amateur team
- 2014–2015: TJ Favorit Brno

Professional teams
- 2016–2021: Whirlpool–Author
- 2022: Gazprom–RusVelo
- 2022: Elkov–Kasper
- 2023–: Team Felbermayr–Simplon Wels

Major wins
- One-day races and Classics National Road Race Championships (2021)

Michael Kukrle (born 17 November 1994) is a Czech cyclist, who currently rides for UCI Continental team Team Felt–Felbermayr.

== Career ==
Kukrle joined Whirlpool–Author in 2016 and stayed with the team until 2022. In June 2021 he won the National Road race championship of the Czech Republic. Kukrle rode in the road race at the 2020 Summer Olympics he joined the early breakaway staying away for 180 km before finishing in 36th. In October 2021 it was announced that Kukrle would join Gazprom–RusVelo from 2022 on a 2-year contract. After Gazprom–RusVelo lost its UCI license and its riders lost their contracts on 1 March 2022, Kukrle was left without a job. On 30 March 2022 it was announced he would re-join Elkov–Kasper.

== Major results ==
2015
1st Mountains classification, Carpathian Couriers Race
2016
National Under-23 Road Championships

2nd Time trial
3rd Road race

3rd Visegrad 4 Bicycle Race – GP Czech Republic
2017
1st Stage 1 (TTT) Czech Cycling Tour
4th Time trial, National Road Championships
2018
1st Overall Okolo Jižních Čech
1st Stage 3 Czech Cycling Tour
2nd Overall Grand Prix Cycliste de Gemenc

1st Prologue

2nd Croatia–Slovenia
3rd Time trial, National Road Championships
2019
3rd Overall Czech Cycling Tour
Visegrad 4 Bicycle Race

4th GP Slovakia
10th Kerékpárverseny

5th Time trial, National Road Championships
2020
1st Overall Dookoła Mazowsza

1st Stage 3

4th Road race, National Road Championships
2021
National Road Championships

1st Road race
5th Time trial

1st Brno–Velká Bíteš–Brno
1st Memoriał Henryka Łasaka
3rd Visegrad 4 Bicycle Race – GP Slovakia
8th Overall Oberösterreich Rundfahrt
2022
1st Overall Tour du Pays de Montbéliard

1st Stage 1 (ITT)

1st Overall Tour du Loir-et-Cher
2nd Time trial, National Road Championships
3rd Memoriał Jana Magiery
10th Overall Circuit des Ardennes

1st Stage 2

10th Memoriał Henryka Łasaka
2023
1st Mountains classification, Circuit des Ardennes
2024
2nd Road race, National Road Championships
