= Martin Hačecký =

Czech bicycle racer

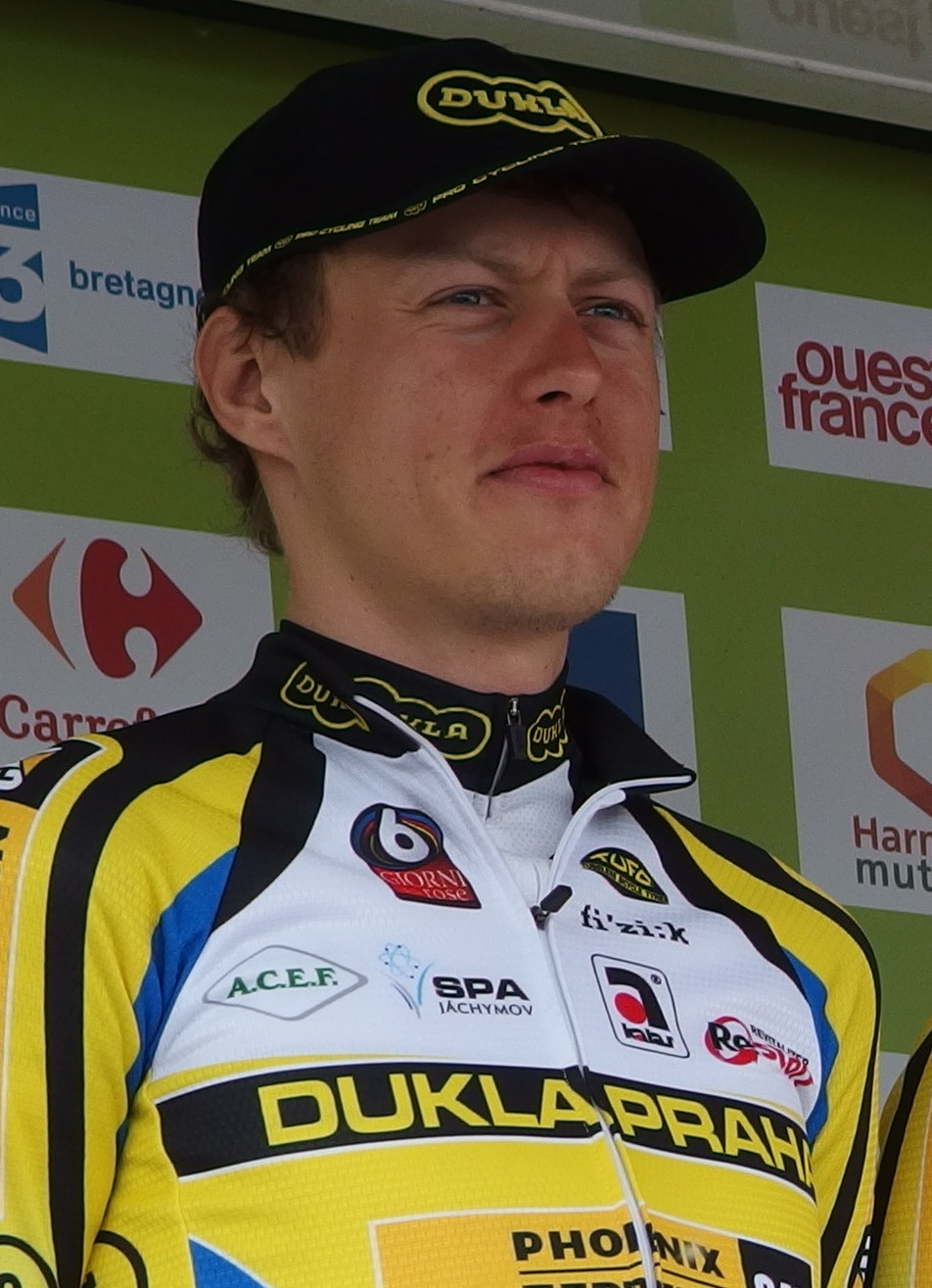
- Hačecký in 2014

Personal information
- Full name: Martin Hačecký
- Born: 24 July 1988 (age 38): Prague, Czechoslovakia; (now Czech Republic)

Cycling career
- Sport: Cycling
- Current team: Retired
- Discipline: Road
- Role: Rider

Professional teams
- 2007–2008: ASC Dukla Praha
- 2010: Atlas Personal–BMC
- 2011–2014: ASC Dukla Praha

Martin Hačecký (born 24 July 1988) is a Czech former professional road cyclist.

== Major results ==
2006
1st Time trial, Junior National Road Championships
1st Overall Peace Race Juniors
4th Overall Grand Prix Rüebliland
2007
3rd Prague–Karlovy Vary–Prague
2010
8th Prague–Karlovy Vary–Prague
2012
1st Grand Prix Kralovehradeckeho kraje
