= Tomáš Bucháček =

Czech road bicycle racer

Personal information
- Full name: Tomáš Bucháček
- Born: 7 March 1978 (age 48): Neplachovice, Czechoslovakia; (now Czech Republic)

Cycling career
- Sport: Cycling
- Discipline: Road
- Role: Rider

Professional teams
- 2002–2003: Joko–Velamos
- 2004: Favorit
- 2005–2018: PSK Whirlpool

Major wins
- National Road Race Championships (2007)

Tomáš Bucháček (born 7 March 1978 in Neplachovice) is a Czech cyclist, who last rode for UCI Continental team Elkov–Author.

== Major results ==
2001
8th Overall Herald Sun Tour
2002
10th Overall Herald Sun Tour
2004
6th Grand Prix Kooperativa
9th Overall Tour de Bohemia

1st Stage 2

2005
2nd Road race, National Road Championships
5th Grand Prix Bradlo
2006
2nd Grand Prix Bradlo
4th Overall Dookoła Mazowsza

1st Mountains classification

7th Overall Tour of Bulgaria

1st Stage 9

8th Overall Okolo Slovenska
8th Memoriał Andrzeja Trochanowskiego
2007
1st Road race, National Road Championships
3rd Overall Tour du Loir-et-Cher

1st Stage 2

6th Overall Circuit des Ardennes

1st Stage 2

6th GP Kranj
7th Overall Tour de Serbie
2010
2nd Overall Czech Cycling Tour
2nd Memoriał Henryka Łasaka
5th Overall Tour of Bulgaria
10th Overall Istrian Spring Trophy
2011
6th Overall Tour du Loir-et-Cher

1st Stage 4

6th Poreč Trophy
7th Overall Course de la Solidarité Olympique

1st Stage 1

8th Overall Czech Cycling Tour
9th Overall Szlakiem Grodów Piastowskich
2012
3rd Tour Bohemia
6th Overall Czech Cycling Tour

1st Stage 1 (TTT)

6th Overall Szlakiem Grodów Piastowskich
6th Grand Prix Královéhradeckého kraje
8th Puchar Uzdrowisk Karpackich
9th Time trial, National Road Championships
2013
5th Overall Okolo Jižních Čech
7th Overall Czech Cycling Tour
7th Overall Okolo Slovenska
2014
National Road Championships

7th Time trial
7th Road race

7th Memoriał Andrzeja Trochanowskiego
10th Overall Okolo Jižních Čech
2015
9th Overall East Bohemia Tour
2016
Visegrad 4 Bicycle Race

4th GP Czech Republic
5th Kerékpárverseny
9th GP Polski
10th GP Slovakia

5th Overall Dookoła Mazowsza
National Road Championships

6th Time trial
7th Road race

10th Overall CCC Tour - Grody Piastowskie
2017
1st Stage 1 (TTT) Czech Cycling Tour
5th Overall Okolo Slovenska
6th Szlakiem Wielkich Jezior
National Road Championships

7th Road race
8th Time trial

9th Memoriał Romana Siemińskiego
10th GP Slovakia
2018
National Road Championships

5th Time trial
9th Road race
