= Jackson Stewart (cyclist) =

American road bicycle racer

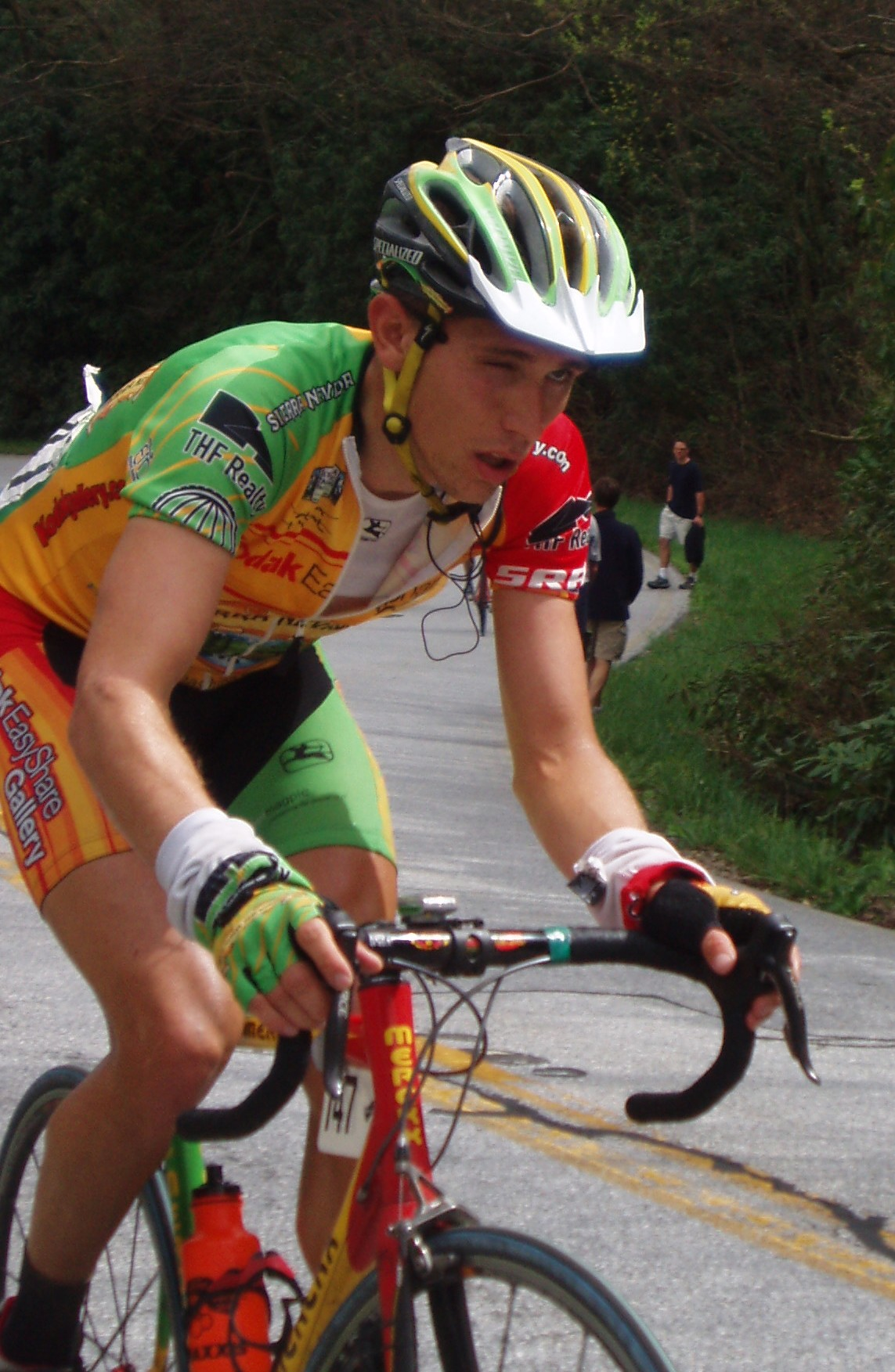
- Stewart in 2006

Personal information
- Full name: Jackson Kyle Stewart
- Born: June 30, 1980 (age 46) United States
- Height: 5 ft 11 in (1.80 m)
- Weight: 158 lb (72 kg)

Cycling career
- Sport: Cycling
- Current team: Retired
- Discipline: Road
- Role: Rider
- Rider type: Sprinter/ Rouler

Amateur team
- 1998–2001: LGBRC/The Olympic Club

Professional teams
- 2002–2004: Ofoto
- 2006: Kodakgallery.com-Sierra Nevada
- 2007–2010: BMC Cycling Team

Major wins
- Lancaster Classic (2006)

Jackson Stewart (born June 30, 1980 in Santa Clara, California) is an American former road racing cyclist, who last rode for the BMC Racing Team.

== Multifaceted ==
Jackson started racing in his early teens and developed as a rider as part of the White Mountain Road Club and later Los Gatos Bicycle Racing Club. As a junior he competed in mountain bike, cyclocross, track, and road racing. As an under-23 (Espoir) rider Jackson raced in Italy for Termoimpianti- Cicli Tommasini based in La California, Tuscany. He is unique to have competed at a high level in events on the road, track, and cyclocross. He finished his career as professional cyclist competing on the road for BMC Racing Team. He has competed in some of the world's biggest races such as E3 Harelbeke, Tour of Flanders Fleche Wallone and Paris-Roubaix. Jackson was known as a solid all-around rider who routinely went in the breakaway and a fast finisher.

== Sports Director ==
Jackson became the U.S.A. Women's National Team Director after his career as a professional cyclist. Managing the Women's National Team program. During his two years with USA Cycling the program developed numerous young champions who later became very successful International and National level professionals. He also led the program to an Olympic Gold medal in the 2012 London Olympics, medals at World Championships, and numerous successes in races throughout the world.

From U.S.A. Cycling, Jackson was recruited as a Sports Director for the UCI WorldTeamBMC Racing Team where he led the team to numerous victories and podium finishes. During his years with the team, he guided the team to victories and podium finishes all over the world, including two victories at the World Team Time Trial Championships, stages of the Tour de France, a stage of the Tour of Italy, stages of the Tour of Spain, the Tour of California, and the Tour of Colorado. He was one of the most successful American UCI WorldTeam Sports Directors in the sport.

== Velodrome ==
On the velodrome Jackson was the 2003 National Madison Champion with partner Erik Saunders where he lapped the field on the Lehigh Valley Velodrome.

== Road Racer ==
At the end of the 2006 season, he was selected to represent USA at the 2006 Road World Championships. In 2008 Jackson competed at the Tour of Qatar amongst numerous UCI Pro-Tour level teams and has also competed in the famed Paris-Roubaix classic for the BMC Pro Cycling Team. Domestically, Jackson won the Redlands criterium in 2009.

== Education ==
Away from cycling, he earned his degree in Business Management from San Jose State University and an MBA from Southern Utah University.

== Achievements ==
2003
1st U.S. National Track Championships – Madison
5th U.S. National Cyclo Cross Championships
1st Superweek Downers Ave. Criterium
2nd Tour De Toona Stage 4
United States World Cyclo-Cross Championship Team Member
2004
5th U.S. National Cyclo Cross Championships
1st Infineon Raceway Criterium
12th Tour of Georgia Stage 2
12th Tour of Georgia Stage 7
1st Santa Nella Road Race
1st Tower District Criterium
United States World Cyclo-Cross Championship Team Member
2005
1st Cat’s Hill Criterium
1st Burlingame Criterium
7th USPRO Criterium
2006
United States World Road Race Championship Team Member
1st Commerce Bank Triple Crown – Lancaster
1st Pacific Bank Criterium
2nd Garret Lemire Ojai Criterium
2nd McClane Criterium
2nd Fitchburg Longsjo Classic Stage 4
2nd Bank of America Criterium
4th Sea Otter Circuit Race
5th Nature Valley Grand Prix Stage 3
6th Raleigh Criterium
7th Fitchburg Longslo Classic Overall
8th Tour of California Stage 4
9th Redlands Classic Stage 4
9th Athens Twilight Criterium
10th Chris Thater Criterium
Tour of California Stage 1 – Aggressive Rider Jersey
2007
1st TTT Giro Della Friuli Venezia Stage 4
2nd Mt. Hamilton Road Race
5th Nevada City Classic
2008
1st Cherry Pie Criterium
1st Watsonville Criterium
Tour of California Stage 1 – KOM Jersey
Tour of California Stage 1 – Aggressive Rider Jersey
2009
Competed in the 2009 Paris-Roubaix
1st Cat’s Hill Criterium
1st Redlands Classic Stage 3
1st San Jose Criterium
1st Snelling Road Race
4th Elk Grove Stage 1
4th Elk Grove Stage Race Overall
4th MERCO Criterium
6th Cascade Classic Stage 4
15th Tour of Picardie Stg. 3
