= Ed' System ZVVZ =

Team information
- UCI code: ZVZ
- Registered: Czech Republic
- Founded: 1996
- Disbanded: 2005
- Discipline: Road
- Status: UCI Professional Continental

Team name history
- 1996 1997 1998 1999–2002 2003–2005: Giant–AIS; ZVVZ–Giant–AIS; ZVVZ–DLD; Wüstenrot–ZVVZ; Ed' System ZVVZ

Ed' System ZVVZ was a Czech UCI Professional Continental cycling team.

== Major wins ==
- Tour de Langkawi: Damian McDonald (1996)
- Niedersachsen-Rundfahrt: Jens Voigt (1997)
- Volta ao Algarve: Tomáš Konečný (1998)
- Okolo Slovenska: René Andrle (2000)
- Tour de Beauce: Tomáš Konečný (2000)
- Poreč Trophy 5: Tomáš Konečný (2000), Lubor Tesař (2001)
- Tour of Qinghai Lake: Martin Mareš (2005)
