= Lubor Tesař =

Czech cyclist

Personal information
- Born: 11 May 1971 (age 55) Plzeň, Czechoslovakia

Cycling career
- Sport: Cycling
- Current team: Retired
- Discipline: Road
- Role: Rider

Professional teams
- 1996: Tico
- 2000: PSK–Unit Expert
- 2001: Wüstenrot–ZVVZ
- 2002: Nurnberger Versicherung
- 2003–2004: Ed' System ZVVZ
- 2005: AKUD–Arnolds Sicherheit
- 2006: Wiesenhof–AKUD

Lubor Tesař (born 11 May 1971) is a former Czech cyclist. He was a bronze medalist in the 1993 Road World Championships in the amateur category. He competed in the men's point race at the 1992 Summer Olympics.

== Major results ==
1990
1st Stage 4 Tour of Austria
1991
1st Overall Niedersachsen-Rundfahrt

1st Stage 10a (ITT)

1st Prologue Tour of Austria
1992
1st Overall Okolo Slovenska
1993
1st Road race, National Road Championships
1st Stage 7 Bayern Rundfahrt
3rd Amateur road race, UCI Road World Championships
4th Overall Peace Race

1st Stages 2, 4 & 6

1994
1st Road race, National Road Championships
1998
2nd Time trial, National Road Championships
1999
1st Stage 6 Tour de Serbie
2000
2nd Time trial, National Road Championships
2nd Overall Tour de Serbie

1st Stages 4 & 5

2001
1st Poreč Trophy
1st Stages 1 & 4 Giro del Capo
1st Prologue & Stage 2 Tour of Saudi Arabia
2nd Overall Sachsen-Tour
3rd Overall Giro del Capo
3rd Rund um Düren
4th GP Istria
2002
1st Rund um Düren
1st Stages 2, 3 & 7 Tour de Beauce
2003
1st Road race, National Road Championships
1st Stage 6 Tour de Beauce
3rd Memoriał Henryka Łasaka
3rd Sparkassen Giro Bochum
2004
1st Overall Tour Bohemia

1st Stage 1

National Road Championships

3rd Time trial
4th Road race

5th Overall Giro del Capo

1st Stage 3

2005
1st Sparkassen Giro Bochum
2006
1st Stage 7 Peace Race
