= Rabaki Jérémie Ouédraogo =

Burkinabé cyclist

Rabaki Jérémi Ouedraogo
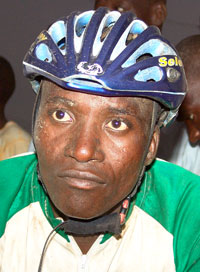

Personal information
- Born: 1 January 1973 (age 53)

Cycling career
- Sport: Cycling
- Discipline: Road
- Role: Rider

Rabaki Jérémie Ouédraogo (born 1 January 1973) is a professional road racing cyclist from Burkina Faso. He is the 2005–06 UCI Africa Tour season champion and the overall winner at the 2005 Tour du Faso. He was one of three riders to represent his nation at the 2006 UCI Road World Championships Road Race.

== Major results ==
2004
4th, Overall, Tour du Faso
2005
Burkina Faso National Cycling Championship Road Race
1st, Overall, Tour du Faso

1st, Stage 1
1st, Stage 8

2006
2005-2006 Champion, UCI Africa Tour
Burkina Faso National Cycling Championship Road Race
1st, Overall, Boucle du Coton

1st, Stage 1
1st, Stage 7

Rider, UCI Road World Championships Road Race
