= Rynárec =

- Municipality
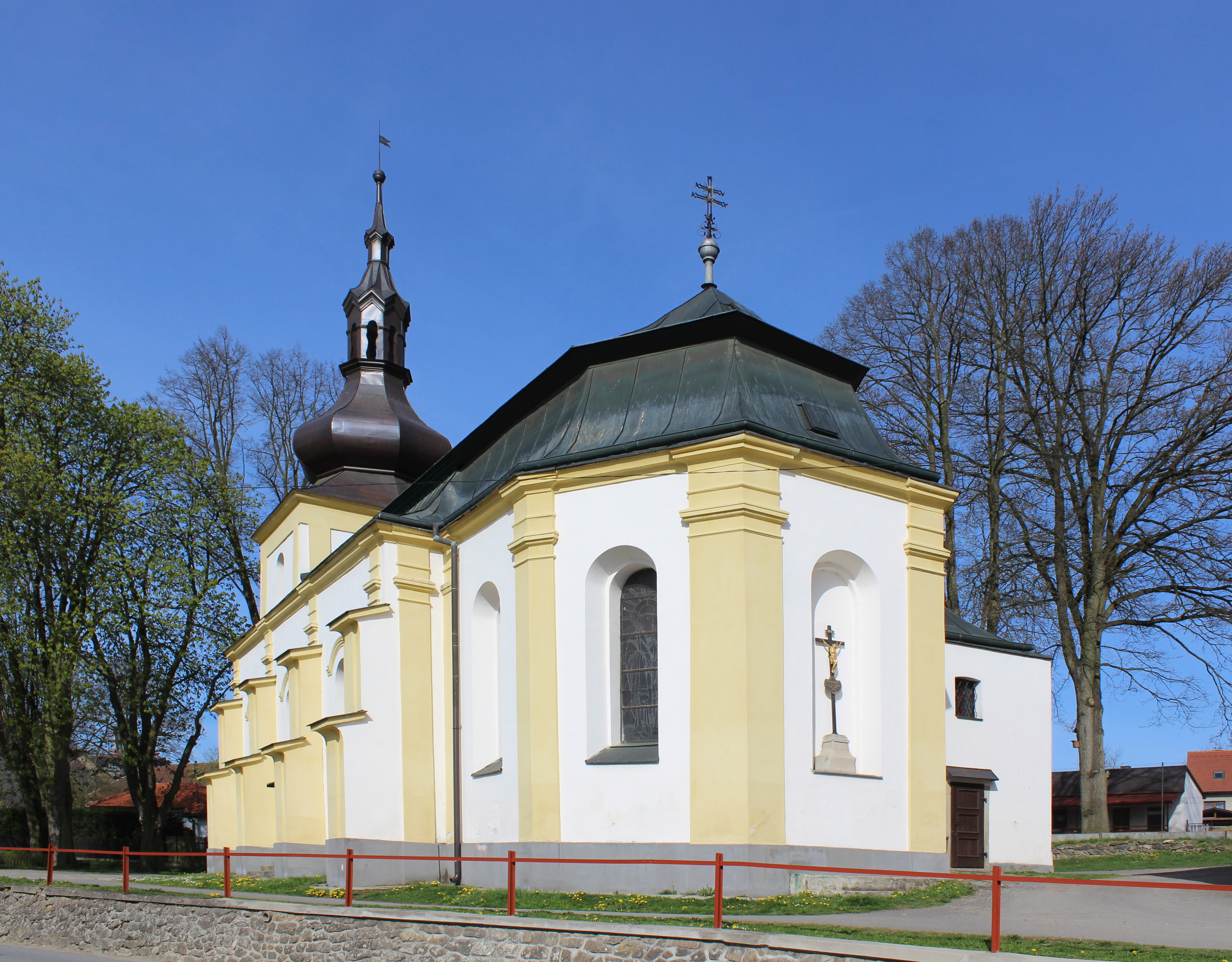
- Church of Saint Lawrence

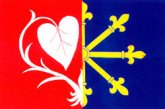
- Flag Coat of arms

- Location in the Czech Republic
- Coordinates: 49°23′23″N 15°14′5″E
- Country: Czech Republic
- Region: Vysočina
- District: Pelhřimov
- First mentioned: 1203

Area
  - Total: 5.99 km^{2} (2.31 sq mi)
- Elevation: 518 m (1,699 ft)

Population (2026-01-01)
  - Total: 653
  - Density: 109/km^{2} (282/sq mi)
- Time zone: UTC+1 (CET)
  - Summer (DST): UTC+2 (CEST)
- Postal code: 394 01
- Website: www.rynarec.cz

Rynárec is a municipality and village in Pelhřimov District in the Vysočina Region of the Czech Republic. It has about 700 inhabitants.

Rynárec lies approximately 6 kilometres (4 mi) south of Pelhřimov, 27 km (17 mi) west of Jihlava, and 98 km (61 mi) southeast of Prague.

== Demographics ==
Historical population
Year	Pop.	±%
1869	414	—
1880	466	+12.6%
1890	454	−2.6%
1900	410	−9.7%
1910	474	+15.6%
1921	486	+2.5%
1930	383	−21.2%
1950	368	−3.9%
1961	384	+4.3%
1970	413	+7.6%
1980	488	+18.2%
1991	464	−4.9%
2001	498	+7.3%
2011	566	+13.7%
2021	635	+12.2%
Source: Censuses

== Notable people ==
- Martin Hunal (born 1989), cyclist
