= Matěj Zahálka =

Czech cyclist

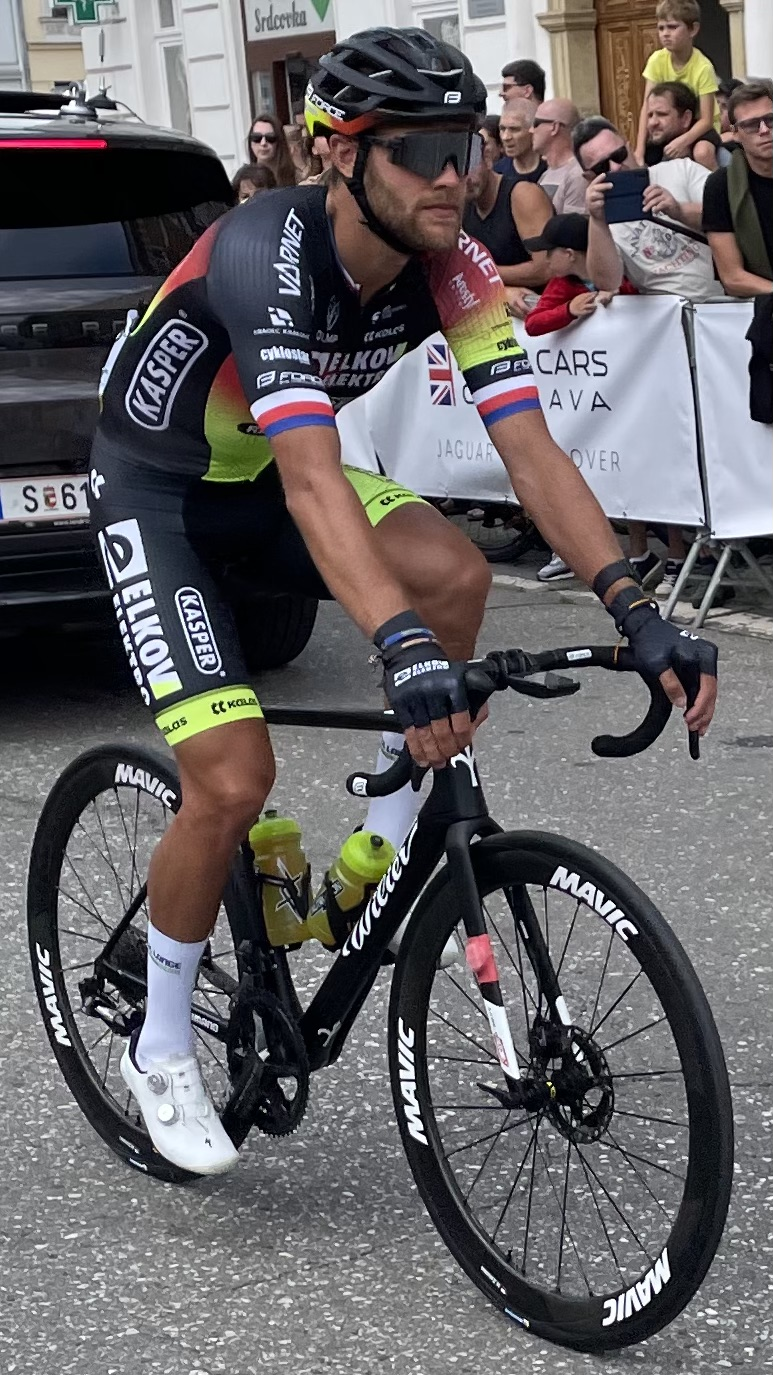
- Zahálka in 2023

Personal information
- Born: 4 December 1993 (age 32) Czech Republic
- Height: 1.82 m (6 ft 0 in)
- Weight: 72 kg (159 lb)

Cycling career
- Sport: Cycling
- Current team: Kasper Crypto4me
- Discipline: Road
- Role: Rider

Amateur team
- 2012: CK Atény

Professional teams
- 2013: Experiment 23
- 2014–2017: SKC TUFO Prostějov
- 2018–: Elkov–Author

Major wins
- One-day races and Classics National Road Race Championships (2022)

Matěj Zahálka (born 4 December 1993) is a Czech racing cyclist, who currently rides for UCI Continental team Kasper Crypto4me. He won the Czech National Road Race Championships in 2022.

== Major results ==
2016
8th Visegrad 4 Kerékpárverseny
2017
7th Visegrad 4 Kerékpárverseny
2018
2nd Velká Bíteš–Brno–Velká Bíteš
4th Visegrad 4 Kerékpárverseny
4th GP Czech Republic
10th GP Slovakia
2019
2nd Overall Tour de Vysočina
5th GP Slovakia
2021
3rd Overall Circuit des Ardennes
8th Memorial Henryka Łasaka
2022
1st Road race, National Road Championships
3rd Memorial Henryka Łasaka
4th Memoriał Jana Magiery
6th Overall Tour du Pays de Montbéliard
2023
2nd Overall Circuit des Ardennes
5th GP Poland
