= Madeinox–BRIC–AR Canelas =

Associação Recreativa de Canelas
Team information
- UCI code: MAD
- Registered: Portugal
- Founded: 2005
- Disbanded: 2007
- Discipline: Road
- Status: Continental (2005–2007)
- Bicycles: Orbea

Key personnel
- Team manager: Emídio Pinto

Team name history
- 2001 2002–2004 2005 2006 2007: Madeinox–A.R. Canelas; Madeinox–A.R. Canelas–Gaia; Madeinox–A.R. Canelas (MAD); Madeinox–BRIC–A.R. Canelas (MAD); Madeinox - BRIC - Loule
Jersey

Madeinox–BRIC–AR Canelas (UCI team code: MAD) was a Portuguese professional cycling team based in Canelas. It was one of the European teams in UCI Continental Tour.

Bruno Neves took the teams first non-national championship win when he won Stage 9 of the Volta a Portugal. In 2007 at the GP CTT Correios de Portugal the team won two stages and the overall. Stage one was won by André Vital Moreira who won the 173km stage in a reduced bunch sprint. Stage 3 was the second stage of the race where Nuño Duarte Silva Marta won another reduced bunch sprint this time with the bonus seconds he took the lead and held it through to the end of the race.

== Team roster ==
On January 1 2006

Rider	Date of birth
Carlos Alberto Carneiro (POR)	14 January 1970 (aged 35)
Marco Cunha (POR)	28 February 1987 (aged 18)
Cláudio Faria (POR)	1 October 1977 (aged 28)
Lizuarte Martins (POR)	23 August 1978 (aged 27)
Bruno Neves (POR)	5 September 1981 (aged 24)
Hélder Oliveira (POR)	20 February 1983 (aged 22)

Rider	Date of birth
Hélder Pereira (POR)	14 October 1982 (aged 23)
Bruno Pinto (POR)	8 June 1985 (aged 20)
Fernando Sousa (POR)	9 March 1979 (aged 26)
Sérgio Sousa (POR)	11 October 1983 (aged 22)
André Vital (POR)	22 November 1982 (aged 23)

== Major wins ==
2005
Portuguese Under-23 Road Race, Hélder Oliveira
Stage 9 Volta a Portugal, Bruno Neves
2006
Troféu RDP-Algarve, Bruno Neves
Points classification Troféu Joaquim Agostinho, Cláudio Faria
2007
Overall Vuelta a Extremadura, Nuno Marta

Stage 1, André Vital Moreira
Stage 3, Nuno Marta

Stage 3 GP CTT Correios de Portugal, André Vital Moreira
