= Bruno Neves =

Portuguese cyclist (1981–2008)

- Neves after a stage win in the 2007 Volta a Albufeira

Personal information
- Full name: Bruno Neves
- Born: 5 September 1981 Oliveira de Azeméis, Portugal
- Died: 11 May 2008 (aged 26) Amarante, Portugal

Cycling career
- Sport: Cycling
- Discipline: Road
- Role: Rider
- Rider type: Sprinter

Professional teams
- 2003–2004: ASC–Vila do Conde
- 2005–2006: Madeinox–BRIC–AR Canelas
- 2007–2008: LA–MSS

Bruno Neves (5 September 1981 – 11 May 2008) was a Portuguese professional road racing cyclist born in Oliveira de Azeméis. He was one of the best sprinters of the Portuguese peloton, having won one stage in the Volta a Portugal. He was also the winner of the green jersey of the Tour de Avenir in 2006.

On 11 May 2008, Neves was involved in an accident during the Clássica de Amarante, when he was wearing the leader jersey. He was believed to have died from severe injuries caused by the crash, but it was later revealed that he suffered a heart attack while riding his bike, causing the crash. He died shortly before reaching the hospital.

== See also ==
- List of professional cyclists who died during a race
