= Martin Mareš =

Czech cyclist

Personal information
- Full name: Martin Mareš
- Born: 23 January 1982 (age 44) Blansko, Czech Republic

Cycling career
- Sport: Cycling
- Current team: Retired
- Discipline: Road
- Role: Rider

Professional teams
- 2002-2003: PSK - Remerx
- 2004: Bauknecht-Author
- 2005: eD'System - ZVVZ
- 2006: Aurum Hotels
- 2007-2010: Bauknecht-Author

Major wins
- Tour of Qinghai Lake (2005)

Martin Mareš (born 23 January 1982 in Blansko) is a retired Czech cyclist.

== Palmares ==
2004
1st Czech National Road Race Championships U23
8th stage Tour de l'Avenir

2005
1st overall Tour of Qinghai Lake

2007
7th stage Tour of Qinghai Lake
2nd overall Tour de Slovaquie

2009
1st Czech National Road Race Championships
