= Stanislav Kozubek =

Czech cyclist

Personal information
- Born: 9 June 1980 (age 46) Prague

Cycling career
- Sport: Cycling
- Current team: Retired
- Discipline: Road
- Role: Rider

Professional teams
- 2003: ASC Dukla Praha
- 2005: ASC Dukla Praha
- 2006-2013: PSK Whirlpool-Author

Stanislav Kozubek (born 9 June 1980 in Prague) is a former Czech cyclist.

== Palmares ==
1999
3rd Junior World Team Pursuit Championships
2001
1st Team pursuit European Track Championships
2005
3rd National Road Race Championships
3rd Grand Prix Cycliste de Gemenc
National Scratch Champion
National Team Pursuit Champion
2006
National Road Race Champion
1st stage 4b Okolo Slovenska
2007
National Time Trial Champion
1st Prague-Karlovy Vary-Prague
2008
3rd National Road Race Championships
2009
2nd National Time Trial Championships
3rd National Road Race Championships
2010
2nd Oberösterreich-Rundfahrt
2nd National Road Race Championships
3rd Raiffeisen Grand Prix
2011
1st Czech Cycling Tour
