= Pavlína Šulcová =

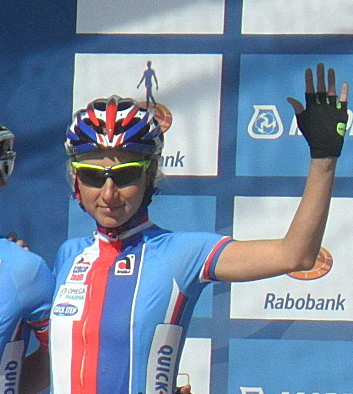
- Pavlína Šulcová at the 2012 UCI Road World Championships

Personal information
- Born: 9 May 1986 (age 40) Czech Republic

Cycling career
- Sport: Cycling
- Discipline: Road cycling

Pavlína Šulcová (born 9 May 1986) is a road cyclist from the Czech Republic. She participated at the 2012 UCI Road World Championships.
