= Grand Prix Královéhradeckého kraje =

Czech cycling race

Race details
- Date: August
- Discipline: Road
- Competition: UCI Europe Tour
- Type: One day race

History
- First edition: 2012
- Editions: 3
- First winner: Martin Hačecký (CZE)
- Most wins: No repeat winners
- Most recent: Paweł Cieślik (POL)

The Grand Prix Královéhradeckého kraje was a one-day cycling race held annually in the Czech Republic. Its inaugural edition in 2012 was the first such event in the Hradec Králové Region since the Velvet Revolution. It was part of the UCI Europe Tour as a category 1.2 event. The race started and finished in the town of Opočno, featuring elite and under-23 categories as well as amateurs. The fourth edition of the race, in 2015, was part of the East Bohemia Tour.

== Winners ==
Year	Country	Rider	Team
2012	Czech Republic	Martin Hačecký	ASC Dukla Praha
2013	Czech Republic	Petr Vakoč	Etixx–IHNed
2014	Poland	Paweł Cieślik	Bauknecht–Author
