= František Raboň =

Czech mountain biker

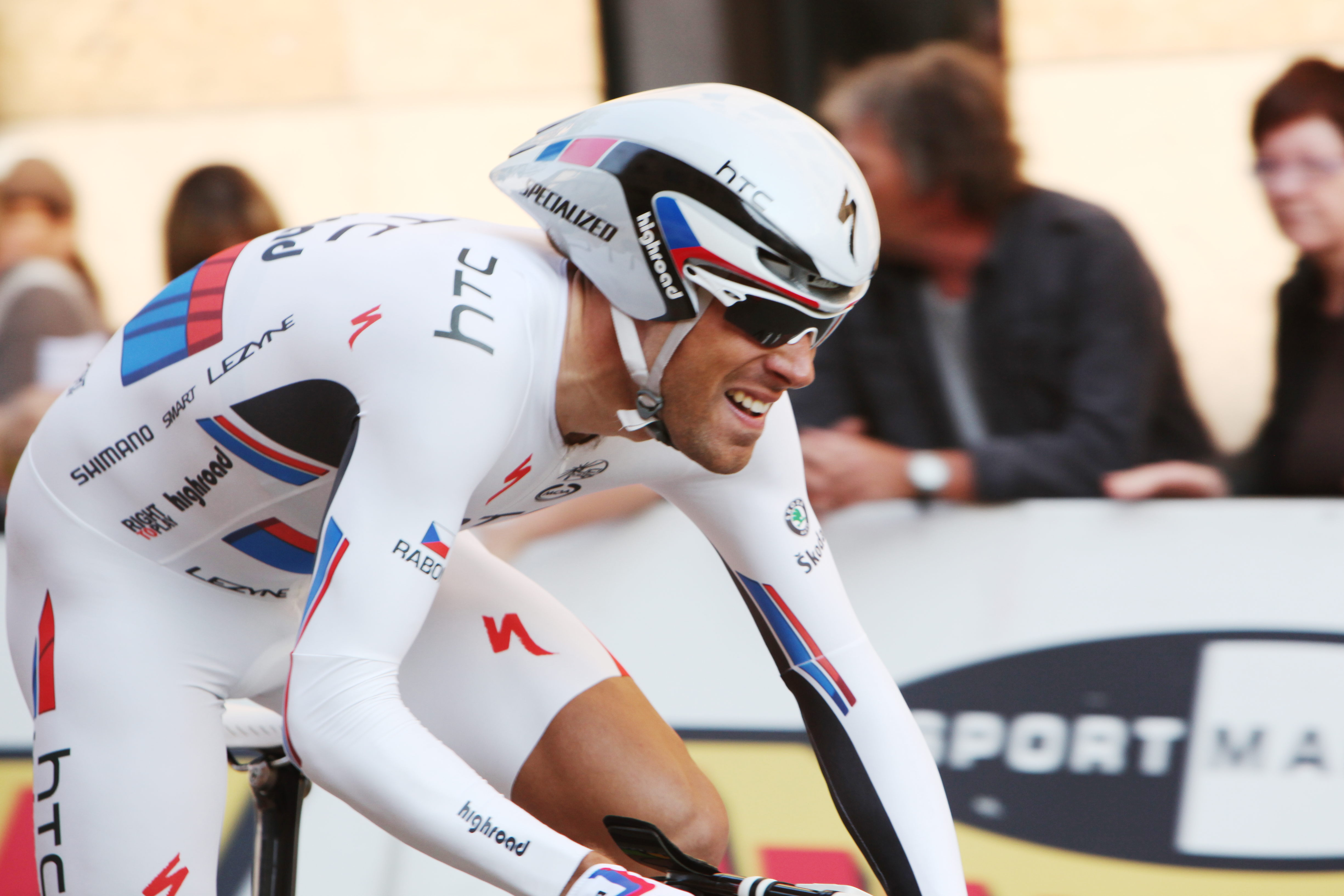
- Raboň in his National Time Trial champion colours

Personal information
- Full name: František Raboň
- Born: 26 September 1983 (age 43) Prague, Czechoslovakia

Cycling career
- Sport: Cycling
- Current team: Specialized Racing Factory Mountain Bike Team
- Disciplines: MTB; Road (former)
- Role: Rider
- Rider type: Endurance (MTB); Time-Trialist (road)

Amateur team
- 2002–2005: PSK–Remerx

Professional teams
- 2006–2011: T-Mobile Team
- 2012–2013: Omega Pharma–Quick-Step
- 2014–: Specialized Racing Factory Mountain Bike Team

Major wins
- Tour de Romandie 2 Stages Vuelta Ciclista a Murcia (2010) 2 Stages (2010); National Time Trial Championships (2008, 2009, 2010)

František Raboň (born 26 September 1983) is a Czech mountain biker for the Specialized Racing Factory Mountain Bike Team. He was formerly a road racing cyclist for UCI ProTeams HTC–Highroad, and Omega Pharma–Quick-Step.

Born in Prague, Raboň turned professional in 2006 with German outfit T-Mobile Team, after having been European road champion the previous season and 3 times Czech Under 23 time trial and one time road race champion.

For the 2014 season, Raboň moved into mountain biking with the Specialized Racing Factory Mountain Bike Team.

== Palmares ==
2003
1st Stage 5 Bałtyk–Karkonosze Tour
2004
1st Stage 9 Tour du Maroc
1st Stage 4 Tour de Slovaquie
6th GP Palma
7th Overall Bałtyk–Karkonosze Tour
2005
1st European Under-23 Road Race Championships
1st Memorial Andrzeja Trochnowskiego
1st Stage 4a (ITT) Tour de Slovaquie
2nd GP Kooperativa
3rd Overall Course de la Solidarité Olympique
3rd Porec Trophy
4th Overall Paths of King Nikola

1st Stage 3

4th Overall Bałtyk–Karkonosze Tour
5th GP Palma
8th Overall Tour of Małopolska

1st Stage 1

2006
3rd National Time Trial Championships
2008
1st National Time Trial Championships
1st Stage 5 Tour of Ireland
3rd Praha–Karlovy Vary–Praha
6th Overall Danmark Rundt
8th Hel van het Mergelland
2009
1st National Time Trial Championships
Tour de Romandie

1st Prologue (ITT) & Stage 3 (TTT)

1st Stage 3 (ITT) Vuelta Ciclista a Murcia
2nd Overall Critérium International
2010
1st National Time Trial Championships
1st Overall Vuelta Ciclista a Murcia

1st Stage 4 (ITT)

7th Overall Volta ao Algarve
2012
1st Stage 2b (TTT) Tour de l'Ain
2nd National Road Race Championships
3rd National Time Trial Championships
2013
4th Tour Bohemia
9th Overall Driedaagse van West-Vlaanderen
