= Petr Benčík =

Czech cyclist (born 1976)

Personal information
- Full name: Petr Benčík
- Born: 29 January 1976 (age 50) Česká Lípa, Czechoslovakia
- Height: 1.80 m (5 ft 11 in)
- Weight: 73 kg (161 lb)

Cycling career
- Sport: Cycling
- Current team: Retired
- Discipline: Road
- Role: Rider

Professional teams
- 2000–2002: Wüstenrot ZVVZ
- 2003–2005: Ed' System ZVVZ
- 2006–2007: PSK Whirlpool–Hradec Krlove
- 2008–2012: PSK Whirlpool–Author

Petr Benčík (born 29 January 1976) is a retired Czech professional road cyclist. He represented his nation Czech Republic at the 2008 Summer Olympics, and also claimed three sporting titles in men's road race at the national championships as a full-fledged member of the Czech cycling team.

Bencik made his professional cycling debut in 2000 for the team Wüstenrot ZVVZ. Throughout his career, he captured numerous cup titles in both national and global road cycling tournaments, including his tremendous triumph from the 2006 Memoriał Henryka Łasaka in Poland.

Riding for PSK Whirlpool–Author pro cycling team since 2006, Bencik qualified for the Czech squad, as a 32-year-old, in the men's road race at the 2008 Summer Olympics in Beijing by receiving one half of the nation's two berths from UCI Europe Tour, along with his teammate Roman Kreuziger. He successfully completed a grueling race with a seventy-fifth-place finish through a vast field of nearly a hundred cyclists in 6:39:42. Bencik's official result was later elevated to seventy-fourth position, when Italy's Davide Rebellin had tested positive for CERA that consequently stripped off his Olympic silver medal.

== Career highlights ==
1996
3rd Czech Championships (Road)
1998
1st Overall Olympik Trnava, Slovakia

1st Stage 1

2000
3rd Prologue Tour de Beauce, Quebec (CAN)
2nd Stage 10 Herald Sun Tour, Apollo Bay, Victoria (AUS)
2nd Stage 11 Herald Sun Tour, Geelong, Victoria (AUS)
2003
3rd Stage 3 Tour de Beauce, Quebec (CAN)
2004
2nd Czech Championships (Road), Brno (CZE)
2nd Memoriał Henryka Łasaka, Poland
2006
1st Memoriał Henryka Łasaka, Poland
2007
3rd Overall Tour du Loir-et-Cher 'Edmond-Provost', Vendôme (FRA)

3rd Stage 3

3rd Czech Championships (Road)
3rd Friedens und Freundschaftstour, Austria

1st Stage 1, Bad Leonfelden

2008
1st Czech Championships (Road)
74th Olympic Games, Beijing (CHN)
2010
1st Czech Championships (Road)
8th Overall Oberösterreich Rundfahrt, Austria
2011
1st Czech Championships (Road)
1st Overall Oberösterreich Rundfahrt, Austria

1st Stage 1, Traun

9th Czech Cycling Tour, Czech Republic
8th Coupe des Carpathes, Poland
