= Tufo–Pardus Prostějov =

Czech cycling team

Team information
- UCI code: SKC
- Registered: Czech Republic
- Founded: 2013
- Discipline: Road
- Status: UCI Continental
- Website: Team home page

Key personnel
- General manager: Petr Šrámek
- Team managers: Michal Mráček; Martin Cetkovský; Tomáš Konečný

Team name history
- 2013–2017 2018 2019–: SKC TUFO Prostějov; Pardus–Tufo Prostějov; Tufo–Pardus Prostějov

Tufo–Pardus Prostějov is a UCI Continental team founded in 2013 and based in the Czech Republic. It participates in UCI Continental Circuits races.

== Team roster ==
As of 1 March 2021.

Rider	Date of birth
Daniel Babor (CZE)	22 October 1999 (age 26)
Marek Dolníček (CZE)	7 November 1999 (age 26)
Pavel Grässle (CZE)	4 April 1985 (age 41)
Pavel Gruber (CZE)	24 April 1996 (age 30)
Jakub Hník (CZE)	3 January 2001 (age 25)

Rider	Date of birth
Luděk Lichnovský (CZE)	9 February 1995 (age 31)
Wojciech Pszczolarski (POL)	26 April 1991 (age 35)
Filip Řeha (CZE)	12 March 2001 (age 25)
René Smékal (CZE)	12 March 2001 (age 25)
Bruno Stoček (CZE)	5 July 2001 (age 25)
