= Zdeněk Křížek =

Czech footballer

Personal information
- Date of birth: 16 January 1983 (age 43)
- Place of birth: Czechoslovakia
- Height: 1.95 m (6 ft 5 in)
- Position: Goalkeeper

Youth career
- 1989–2001: Fezko/SK Strakonice

Senior career*
Years	Team	Apps	(Gls)
2001–2020	České Budějovice	23	(0)
2004–2005	→ Prachatice (loan)	16	(0)

International career^{‡}
1998–1999	Czech Republic U15	3	(0)
1999–2000	Czech Republic U16	4	(0)
2000–2001	Czech Republic U17	3	(0)
2001	Czech Republic U19	1	(0)
2002	Czech Republic U20	1	(0)
- * Club domestic league appearances and goals as of 11 September 2011 ‡ National team caps and goals as of 11 September 2011

Zdeněk Křížek (born 16 January 1983) is a former Czech footballer, who last played for České Budějovice as a goalkeeper. He has represented his country at youth international level.
