= Kasper Crypto4me =

Czech cycling team

Kasper crypto4me
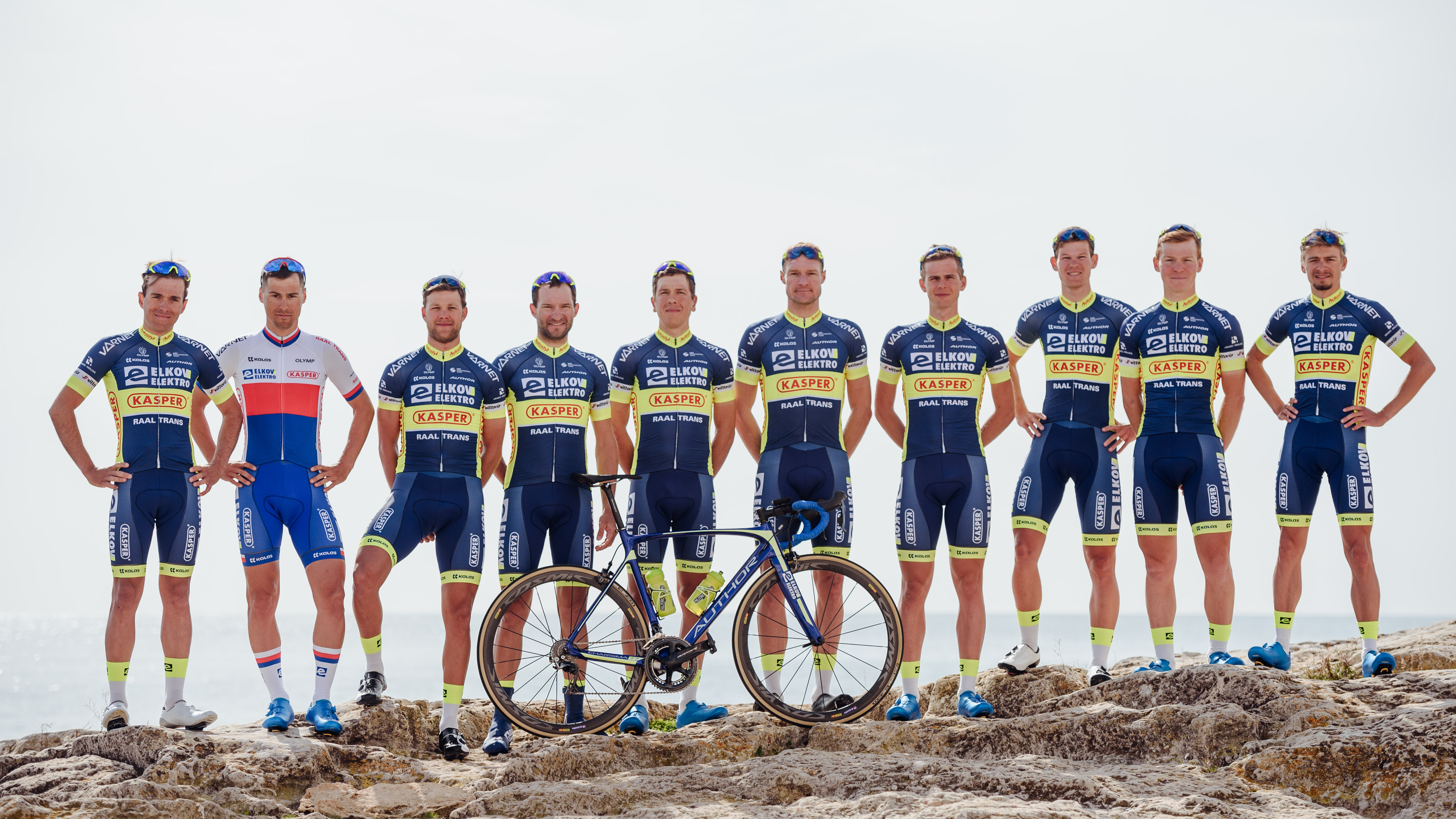

Team information
- UCI code: PSK (2000–2011); WHI (2012, 2015–2016); BAU (2013–2014); ELA (2017–2019); ELK (2020); EKA (2021–2025); KCR (2026–)
- Registered: Czech Republic
- Founded: 2000
- Discipline: Road
- Status: Div. III: 2000–2004; Cont: 2005–2007; ProCont: 2008–2009; Cont: 2010–
- Website: Team home page

Key personnel
- General manager: Vladimir Vavra
- Team managers: Otakar Fiala; Tomáš Ondráček; Michal Rejholec; František Sisr

Team name history
- 2000 2001–2003 2004–2005 2006–2007 2008–2011 2012 2013–2014 2015–2016 2017–2019 2020–2025 2026–: PSK–Unit Expert (PSK); PSK–Remerx (PSK); PSK Whirlpool (PSK); PSK Whirlpool Hradec Králové (PSK); PSK Whirlpool–Author (PSK); Whirlpool–Author (WHI); Bauknecht–Author (BAU); Whirlpool Author (WHI); Elkov–Author (ELA); Elkov–Kasper (EKA); Kasper crypto4me

Kasper crypto4me (UCI team code: KCR) is a UCI Continental road bicycle racing team based in Czech Republic and participates on the UCI Europe Tour. The sponsors of the team are Elkov, an electrical company, and Kasper, a steel manufacturer. The team was one of the best cycling teams before the lifting of the Iron Curtain. The team became professional in 2000. The best known riders for the team were Alois Kaňkovský and Tomáš Bucháček. For the 2008 season the German sprinter André Schulze came from the Wiesenhof team and also Czech cyclist Ondřej Sosenka, a former World Hour Record holder, joined the team.

== Team roster ==
As of 27 May 2023.

Rider	Date of birth
Jan Bárta (CZE)	7 December 1984 (age 41)
Michael Boroš (CZE)	9 August 1992 (age 34)
Jan Lukeš (CZE)	26 May 2004 (age 22)
Daniel Mráz (CZE)	22 March 2004 (age 22)
Dominik Neuman (CZE)	23 October 1995 (age 30)
Tomáš Obdržálek (CZE)	27 March 2003 (age 23)

Rider	Date of birth
Tomáš Přidal (CZE)	2 February 2004 (age 22)
Filip Řeha (CZE)	12 March 2001 (age 25)
Štěpán Telecký (CZE)	28 August 2004 (age 22)
Adam Ťoupalík (CZE)	9 May 1996 (age 30)
Matěj Zahálka (CZE)	4 December 1993 (age 32)

== Major wins ==
2000
Stage 2 Vuelta a Cuba, Lubomír Kejval
Stage 13 Vuelta a Cuba, Petr Herman
Stage 10 Course de la Paix, Ondřej Sosenka
GP ZTS Dubnica, Petr Herman
Stage 1 Tour de Serbie, Petr Herman
Stage 4 & 5 Tour de Serbie, Lubor Tesař
Czech Republic Road Race Championship, Lubomír Kejval
Czech Republic Time Trial Championship, Ondřej Sosenka
Overall Bohemia Tour, Ondřej Sosenka

Stage 3, Ondřej Sosenka

Stages 1 & 2 Okolo Slovenska, Lubomír Kejval
2001
Brno–Velká Bíteš–Brno, Petr Herman
Overall Okolo Slovenska, František Trkal

Stage 2, František Trkal
Stage 3, Lubomír Kejval

2003
Stage 5 Bałtyk–Karkonosze Tour, František Raboň
2004
Stage 9 Tour du Maroc, František Raboň
Slovakia Road Race Championship, Martin Riška
Overall Tour of Małopolska, Ondřej Fadrny

Stage 1, Ondřej Fadrny

Stage 2 Okolo Slovenska, Martin Riška
Stage 8 Tour de l'Avenir, Martin Mareš
2005
Stage 3 The Paths of King Nikola, František Raboň
Memoriał Andrzeja Trochanowskiego, František Raboň
Grand Prix Bradlo, Martin Riška
Stage 1 Dookoła Mazowsza, Jan Faltýnek
Stage 1 Tour of Małopolska, František Raboň
Stage 1 Okolo Slovenska, Martin Riška
Stage 4a Okolo Slovenska, František Raboň
Stage 5 Okolo Slovenska, Radek Blahut
2006
Stage 1 Istrian Spring Trophy, Jan Faltýnek
Stage 2 Istrian Spring Trophy, Martin Riška
Stage 1 Tour of Greece, Martin Riška
Stage 4 Presidential Cycling Tour of Turkey, Giorgios Tentsos
Czech Republic Road Race Championship, Stanislav Kozubek
Stage 6 Dookoła Mazowsza, René Andrle
Memoriał Henryka Łasaka, Petr Benčík
Stage 5 Okolo Slovenska, Stanislav Kozubek
Stage 7 Tour of Bulgaria, Radek Blahut
Stage 9 Tour of Bulgaria, Tomáš Bucháček
2007
Stage 2 Circuit des Ardennes, Tomáš Bucháček
Stage 2 Tour du Loir-et-Cher, Tomáš Bucháček
GP Palma, Petr Benčík
Greece Time Trial Championship, Giorgios Tentsos
Czech Republic Road Race Championship, Tomáš Bucháček
Czech Republic Time Trial Championship, Stanislav Kozubek
Stage 7 Tour of Qinghai Lake, Martin Mareš
Praha–Karlovy Vary–Praha, Stanislav Kozubek
2008
Stage 2 Szlakiem Grodów Piastowskich, André Schulze
Czech Republic Road Race Championship, Petr Benčík
Stages 1 & 6 Course de la Solidarité Olympique, André Schulze
2009
Stage 3 Presidential Cycling Tour of Turkey, André Schulze
Czech Republic Road Race Championship, Martin Mareš
Stage 1 Course de la Solidarité Olympique, Matthias Friedemann
Stage 5 Course de la Solidarité Olympique, Danilo Hondo
Overall Sachsen Tour, Patrik Sinkewitz

Stage 3, Patrik Sinkewitz

Stage 3 Volta a Portugal, Patrik Sinkewitz
Stage 7 Volta a Portugal, Danilo Hondo
Praha–Karlovy Vary–Praha, Danilo Hondo
2010
Memoriał Andrzeja Trochanowskiego, André Schulze
Stage 4 Szlakiem Grodów Piastowskich, André Schulze
Overall Oberösterreichrundfahrt, Leopold König

Stage 1, Leopold König

Czech Republic Road Race Championships, Petr Benčík
Stage 2, 3 & 6 Course de la Solidarité Olympique, André Schulze
Stage 3 Tour of Bulgaria, Leopold König
2011
Stage 4 Tour du Loir-et-Cher, Tomáš Bucháček
Overall Oberösterreichrundfahrt, Petr Benčík

Stage 1, Petr Benčík

Czech Republic Road Race Championships, Petr Benčík
Czech Republic Time Trial Championships, Jiří Hudeček
Stage 1 Course de la Solidarité Olympique, Tomáš Bucháček
Overall Czech Cycling Tour, Stanislav Kozubek
2012
Overall Czech Cycling Tour, František Paďour

Stage 1, Team time trial
Stage 4, Matej Jurčo

2014
Stage 1 Course de la Paix U23, Przemysław Kasperkiewicz
Stage 2 Oberösterreichrundfahrt, Paweł Cieślik
Czech Republic Time Trial Championship, David Dvorský
Grand Prix Královéhradeckého kraje, Paweł Cieślik
2015
Memoriał Romana Siemińskiego, Alois Kaňkovský
Visegrad 4 Bicycle Race – GP Hungary, Alois Kaňkovský
Visegrad 4 Bicycle Race – GP Slovakia, Alois Kaňkovský
Stage 3 Course de la Solidarité Olympique, Alois Kaňkovský
Memoriał Henryka Łasaka, Alois Kaňkovský
Stage 1 East Bohemia Tour, Alois Kaňkovský
2016
Memoriał Andrzeja Trochanowskiego, Alois Kaňkovský
Stage 2 Szlakiem Grodów Piastowskich, Alois Kaňkovský
Memorial Grundmanna I Wizowskiego, Vojtěch Hačecký
Puchar Ministra Obrony Narodowej, Alois Kaňkovský
2017
Visegrad 4 Bicycle Race – GP Slovakia, Alois Kaňkovský
Memoriał Andrzeja Trochanowskiego, Alois Kaňkovský
Memorial Romana Sieminskiego, Alois Kaňkovský
Stage 3 Course Cycliste de Solidarnosc et des Champions Olympiques, Alois Kaňkovský
Overall Dookoła Mazowsza, Alois Kaňkovský

Stages 1 & 4, Alois Kaňkovský

Overall Czech Cycling Tour, Josef Černý

Stage 1 (TTT)
Stage 3, Josef Černý

2018
Stage 2 Tour du Loir et Cher E Provost, Alois Kaňkovský
Visegrad 4 Bicycle Race–GP Czech Republic, Alois Kaňkovský
Memoriał Andrzeja Trochanowskiego, Alois Kaňkovský
Memorial Romana Sieminskiego, Alois Kaňkovský
Stage 2 CCC Tour - Grody Piastowskie, Alois Kaňkovský
Prologue Gemenc Grand Prix, Michael Kukrle
Stage 2 Gemenc Grand Prix, Alois Kaňkovský
Czech Republic Road Race Championships, Josef Černý
Czech Republic Time Trial Championship, Josef Černý
Czech Republic U23 Time Trial Championship, Jakub Otruba
Stage 3 Dookoła Mazowsza, Alois Kaňkovský
Overall Okolo Jižních Čech, Michael Kukrle

Stage 2, Alois Kaňkovský
Stage 4, Josef Černý

2019
Trofej Umag, Alois Kaňkovský
Tour du Loir et Cher E Provost, Jan Bárta
Visegrad 4 Bicycle Race Grand Prix Poland, Alois Kaňkovský
Memoriał Andrzeja Trochanowskiego, Alois Kaňkovský
Memoria Romana Sieminskiego, Alois Kaňkovský
Visegrad 4 Bicycle Race- GP Slovakia, Alois Kaňkovský
Stage 3 Cycling Tour of Bihor, Alois Kaňkovský
Prologue Tour de Hongrie, Jan Bárta
Stage 3b Tour de Hongrie, Alois Kaňkovský
Czech Republic Time Trial Championship, Jan Bárta
Czech Republic U23 Time Trial Championship, Jakub Otruba
Stage 3 Tour Alsace, Michal Schlegel
2020
Czech Republic U23 Time Trial Championship, Jakub Otruba
Czech Republic Road Race Championship, Adam Ťoupalík
2021
Overall Tour of Małopolska, Michal Schlegel

Stage 1, Michal Schlegel

Stage 2 Oberösterreich Rundfahrt, Michal Schlegel
Czech Republic Road Race Championship, Michael Kukrle
Stage 4 Course Cycliste de Solidarnosc et des Champions Olympiques, Jan Bárta
GP Hungary, Michal Schlegel
GP Czech Republic, Adam Ťoupalík
Memoriał Henryka Łasaka, Michael Kukrle
2022
Stage 2 Circuit des Ardennes, Michael Kukrle
Overall Tour du Loir-et-Cher, Michael Kukrle

Stage 1, Daniel Babor

Overall Tour du Pays de Montbéliard, Michael Kukrle

Prologue, Michael Kukrle

Czech Republic Time Trial Championship, Jan Bárta
Czech Republic Road Race Championship, Matěj Zahálka
GP Czech Republic, Adam Ťoupalík
GP Hungary, Adam Ťoupalík
Memoriał Jana Magiery, Michael Boroš
Stages 2 & 5 Tour of Romania, Daniel Babor
Stage 4 Tour of Romania, Jakub Otruba
2023
Trofej Umag, Adam Ťoupalík
GP Goriška & Vipava Valley, Adam Ťoupalík
GP Vorarlberg, Michael Boroš
Czech Republic U23 Road Race Championship, Daniel Mráz
GP Hungary, Adam Ťoupalík
Overall Gemenc Grand Prix, Filip Řeha

Prologue, Filip Řeha

GP Czech Republic, Adam Ťoupalík
Stage 4 Czech Tour, Adam Ťoupalík
2024
Stage 3 Istrian Spring Trophy, Matěj Zahálka
Int. Raiffeisenbank Kirschblütenrennen, Lukáš Kubiš
Czech Republic U23 Time Trial Championship, Daniel Rubeš
Slovakia Time Trial Championship, Lukáš Kubiš
Czech Republic Road Race Championship, Tomáš Přidal
Slovakia Road Race Championship, Lukáš Kubiš

== National Champions ==
2000
Czech Road Race, Lubomír Kejval
Czech Time Trial, Ondřej Sosenka

2004
Slovak Road Race, Martin Riška

2006
Czech Road Race Stanislav Kozubek

2007
Greek Time Trial, Giorgios Tentsos
Czech Road Race, Tomáš Bucháček
Czech Time Trial, Stanislav Kozubek

2008
Czech Road Race, Petr Benčík

2009
Czech Road Race, Martin Mareš

2010
Czech Road Race, Petr Benčík

2011
Czech Road Race, Petr Benčík
Czech Time Trial, Jiří Hudeček

2014
Czech U23 Time Trial, David Dvorský

2018
Czech Road Race, Josef Černý
Czech Time Trial, Josef Černý
Czech U23 Time Trial, Jakub Otruba

2019
Czech Time Trial, Jan Bárta
Czech U23 Time Trial, Jakub Otruba

2020
Czech U23 Time Trial, Jakub Otruba
Czech Road Race, Adam Ťoupalík

2021
Czech Road Race, Michael Kukrle

2022
Czech Time Trial, Jan Bárta
Czech Road Race, Matěj Zahálka
