= East Bohemia Tour =

Race details
- Date: September
- Region: Czech Republic
- Discipline: Road race
- Competition: UCI Europe Tour
- Type: Stage race
- Web site: ebtour.cz/en

History
- First edition: 2015
- Editions: 3 (as of 2017)
- First winner: Jan Tratnik (SLO)
- Most wins: Jan Tratnik (SLO) (2 wins)
- Most recent: Kamil Zieliński (POL)

The East Bohemia Tour is a staged cycling race held annually in the Olomouc region in the Czech Republic. It was created in 2015 and is part of the UCI Europe Tour in category 2.2.

== Winners ==
Year	Country	Rider	Team
2015	Slovenia	Jan Tratnik	Amplatz–BMC
2016	Slovenia	Jan Tratnik	Amplatz–BMC
2017	Poland	Kamil Zieliński	Domin Sport
