= Kirschblütenrennen =

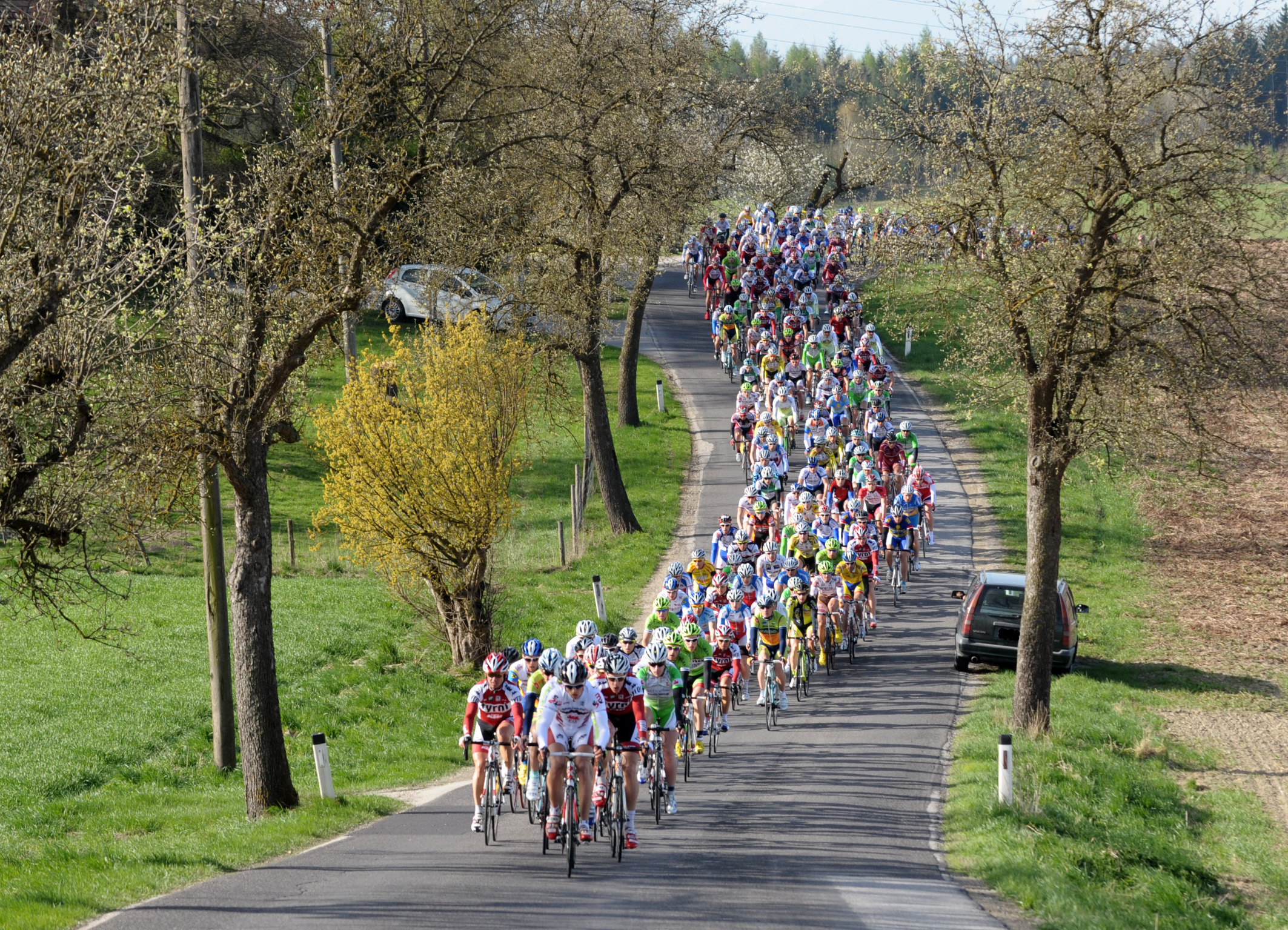
- The 2011 edition of the race

Race details
- Date: April
- Region: Wels, Austria
- English name: Cherry Blossom Race
- Discipline: Road
- Competition: UCI Europe Tour
- Type: One day race
- Organiser: Radclub Arbö Felbermayr Wels
- Web site: kirschbluetenrennen.at

History
- First edition: 1965
- Editions: 62 (as of 2024)
- First winner: Roman Humenberger (AUT)
- Most recent: Lukáš Kubiš (SVK)

The Kirschblütenrennen (English: Cherry Blossom Race) is a one-day road cycling race held annually in Austria since 1965. In 2024, it joined the UCI Europe Tour calendar as a category 1.2 event. The race starts and ends in Wels, and also has junior, amateur and women's categories in addition to the elite men's race..

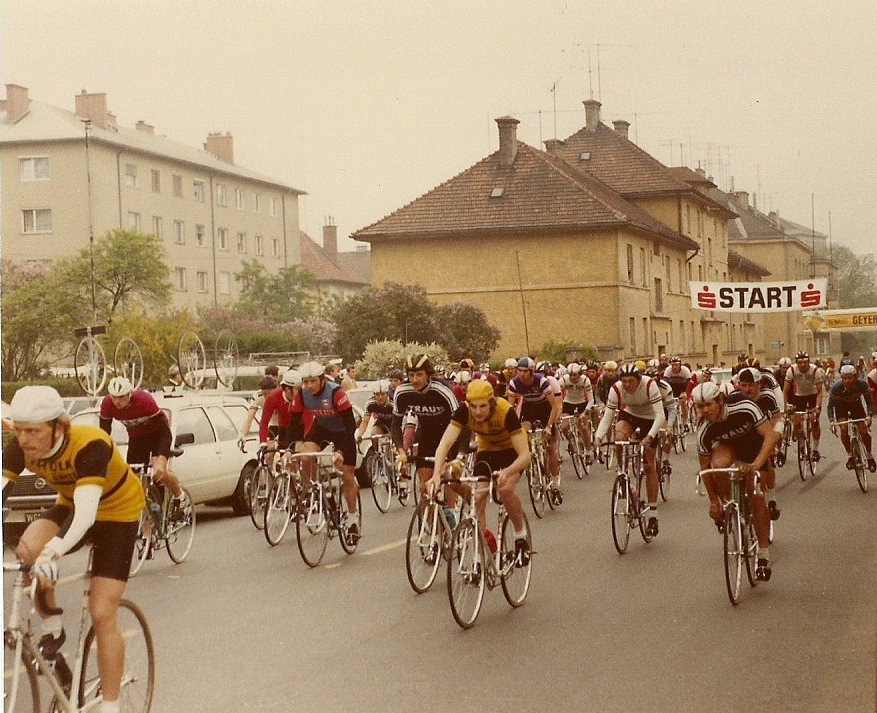
The start of the 1982 edition

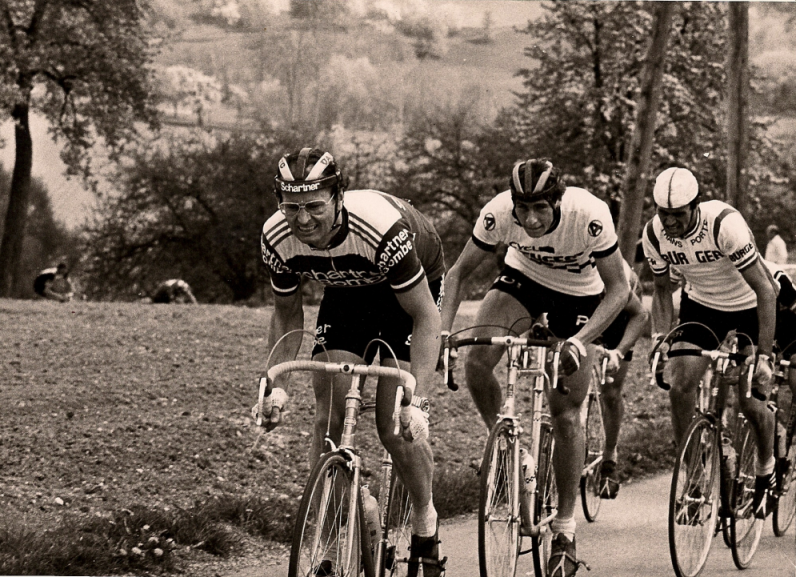
Riders climbing the Mistelbacherberg in 1977

== Winners ==
Year	Winner	Second	Third
1965	(Austria) Roman Humenberger		
1966	(Austria) Johann Wiesinger		
1967	No race		
1968	(Austria) Herbert Kiscina		
1969	(Austria) Rolf Eberl		
1970	(Austria) Franz Wiesinger		
1971	(Austria) Franz Bachmaier		
1972	(Austria) Hans Oberndorfer		
1973	(Austria) Ludwig Kretz		
1974	No race		
1975	(Austria) Siegfried Denk		
1976	(Austria) Ludwig Kretz		
1977	(Austria) Wolfgang Priglhofer		
1978	(Austria) Herbert Spindler		
1979	(Austria) Reinhard Waltenberger		
1980	(Austria) Hermann Mandler		
1981	(Austria) Johann Lienhart		
1982	(Austria) Christian Majnaric		
1983	(Austria) Kurt Zellhofer		
1984	(Austria) Andreas Blümel		
1985	(Austria) Arno Wohlfahrter		
1986	(Austria) Arno Wohlfahrter		
1987	(Austria) Johann Traxler		
1988	(Austria) Dietmar Hauer		
1989	(Austria) Mario Traxl		
1990	(Czech Republic) Richard Koberna		
1991	(Austria) Heinz Marchel		
1992	(Czech Republic) Jozef Regec		
1993	(Austria) Armin Purner		
1994	(Austria) Armin Purner		
1995	(Austria) Josef Lontscharitsch		
1996	(Austria) Franz Stocher		
1997	(Austria) Peter Pichler		
1998	(Czech Republic) Vladimír Sádlo		
1999	(Austria) Florian Wiesinger		
2000	(Austria) Friedrich Berein		
2001	(Austria) Friedrich Berein		
2002	(Austria) Stefan Rucker		
2003	(Austria) Jochen Summer	(Austria) Harald Morscher	(Austria) Ralph Scherzer
2004	(Austria) Paul Kasis	(Australia) Adam Hansen	(Czech Republic) Adam Homolka
2005	(Austria) Jochen Summer	(Czech Republic) Petr Herman	(Slovakia) Róbert Nagy
2006	(Austria) Peter Pichler	(Czech Republic) Martin Hebík	(Slovakia) Ján Valach
2007	(Austria) Peter Pichler	(Austria) Mario Höller	(Austria) Matthias Schröger
2008	(Ukraine) Sergiy Lagkuti	(Ukraine) Vitaliy Popkov	(Austria) Jochen Summer
2009	(Austria) Werner Riebenbauer	(Czech Republic) Petr Lechner	(Germany) Tobias Erler
2010	(Czech Republic) Milan Kadlec	(Germany) Tobias Erler	(Czech Republic) Adam Homolka
2011	(Slovenia) Dejan Bajt	(Germany) Florian Bissinger	(Hungary) Péter Kusztor
2012	(Austria) Stefan Rucker	(Czech Republic) Vojtěch Hačecký	(Austria) Riccardo Zoidl
2013	(Austria) Riccardo Zoidl	(Czech Republic) Alois Kaňkovský	(Austria) Jan Sokol
2014	(Germany) Christopher Hatz	(Germany) Alexander Grad	(Germany) Florenz Knauer
2015	(Slovenia) Jan Tratnik	(Slovakia) Marek Čanecký	(Slovenia) Andi Bajc
2016	(Austria) Daniel Schorn	(Austria) Patrick Gamper	(Austria) Maximilian Kuen
2017	(Slovenia) Matej Mugerli	(Austria) Riccardo Zoidl	(Slovenia) Andi Bajc
2018	(Germany) Jannik Steimle	(Slovenia) Rok Korošec	(Germany) Timon Loderer
2019	(Serbia) Dušan Rajović	(Slovenia) Andi Bajc	(Austria) Maximilian Kuen
2020	Cancelled		
2021	(Slovenia) Matevž Govekar	(Germany) Felix Groß	(Germany) Leslie Lührs
2022	(Austria) Rainer Kepplinger	(Switzerland) Matthias Reutimann	(Austria) Florian Kierner
2023	(Slovenia) Jaka Primožič	(Austria) Daniel Federspiel	(Switzerland) Lukas Rüegg
2024	(Slovakia) Lukáš Kubiš	(Austria) Emanuel Zangerle	(Germany) Roger Kluge
