= List of rosters for Radclub–Resch & Frisch–EYBL and its successors =

The following is a list of rosters of the UCI Continental team, Felbermayr–Simplon Wels categorised by season.

== 2016 ==
Roster in 2016, age as of 1 January 2016:

| Rider | Date of birth |
|---|---|
| Daniel Auer (AUT) | October 26, 1994 (aged 21) |
| Daniel Biedermann (AUT) | March 24, 1993 (aged 22) |
| Markus Eibegger (AUT) | October 16, 1984 (aged 31) |
| Stephan Rabitsch (AUT) | June 28, 1991 (aged 24) |
| Johannes Schinnagel (GER) | May 29, 1996 (aged 19) |
| Daniel Schorn (AUT) | October 21, 1988 (aged 27) |

| Rider | Date of birth |
|---|---|
| Jannik Steimle (GER) | April 4, 1996 (aged 19) |
| Andreas Walzel (AUT) | March 3, 1995 (aged 20) |
| Johannes Weber (GER) | July 30, 1994 (aged 21) |
| Lukas Zeller (AUT) | September 20, 1994 (aged 21) |
| Georg Zimmermann (GER) | October 11, 1997 (aged 18) |
| James McLaughlin (GBR) | October 2, 1990 (aged 25) |

== 2015 ==
As of 7 April 2015.

| Rider | Date of birth |
|---|---|
| Daniel Biedermann (AUT) | 24 March 1993 (age 31) |
| Michael Gogl (AUT) | 4 November 1993 (age 31) |
| Jure Golčer (SLO) | 12 July 1977 (age 47) |
| Felix Großschartner (AUT) | 23 December 1993 (age 31) |
| Marcel Huber (AUT) | 10 September 1996 (age 28) |
| Paul Illenberger (AUT) | 28 December 1991 (age 33) |
| Matthias Krizek (AUT) | 29 September 1988 (age 36) |

| Rider | Date of birth |
|---|---|
| Matija Kvasina (CRO) | 4 December 1981 (age 43) |
| Matej Marin (SLO) | 2 July 1980 (age 44) |
| Gregor Mühlberger (AUT) | 4 April 1994 (age 30) |
| Stephan Rabitsch (AUT) | 28 June 1991 (age 33) |
| Johannes Schinnagel (AUT) | 29 May 1996 (age 28) |
| Martin Schöffmann (AUT) | 31 March 1987 (age 37) |
| Lukas Zeller (AUT) | 20 September 1994 (age 30) |
