= Grand Prix Südkärnten =

Race details
- Date: June
- Region: Austria
- Discipline: Road
- Competition: UCI Europe Tour
- Type: One day race
- Web site: www.team-focus.at

History
- First edition: 2001
- Editions: 16 (as of 2016)
- First winner: Saša Sviben (SLO)
- Most recent: Marek Čanecký (SVK)

The Grand Prix Südkärnten is a cycling race held annually in Austria. It was part of UCI Europe Tour in category 1.2 from 2012 to 2014, when it was demoted to a national event.

== Winners ==
Year	Winner	Second	Third
Kettler Classic-Südkärnten
2001	(Slovenia) Saša Sviben	(Italy) Filippo Baldo	(Czech Republic) Petr Herman
2002	(Russia) Vladislav Borisov	(Italy) Fabio Bulgarelli	(Germany) René Weissinger
Völkermarkter Radsporttage
2003	(Austria) Hannes Hempel	(Austria) Christian Pfannberger	(Italy) Maurizio Vandelli
2004	(Austria) Hans-Peter Obwaller	(Austria) Paul Crake	(Czech Republic) Petr Herman
2005	(Germany) René Weissinger	(Austria) Harald Totschnig	(Slovenia) Uroš Silar
2006	(Germany) Nico Graf	(Slovenia) Gašper Švab	(Czech Republic) Petr Herman
2007	(Austria) Markus Eibegger	(Slovakia) Martin Riška	(Austria) Harald Starzengruber
2008	(Slovakia) Ján Valach	(Austria) Michael Pichler	(Slovakia) Robert Nagy
2009	(Austria) Michael Pichler	(Germany) Björn Thurau	(Czech Republic) Jan Bárta
2010	(Croatia) Matija Kvasina	(Slovenia) Marcel Ternovsek	(Slovenia) Matej Mugerli
2011	(Slovenia) Robert Vrečer	(Slovenia) Vladimir Kerkez	(Slovenia) Dejan Bajt
GP Südkärnten
2012	(Slovenia) Marko Kump	(Italy) Giuseppe De Maria	(Switzerland) Oliver Hofstetter
2013	(France) Julian Alaphilippe	(Slovenia) Matej Mugerli	(Italy) Leonardo Pinizzotto
2014	(Italy) Andrea Pasqualon	(Slovenia) Matej Mugerli	(Austria) Markus Eibegger
2015	(Slovenia) Jan Tratnik	(Italy) Riccardo Bolzan	(Austria) Matthias Krizek
2016	(Slovakia) Marek Čanecký	(Slovenia) Robert Jenko	(Austria) Markus Freiberger
