= Austrian National Road Race Championships =

National road cycling championship in Austria

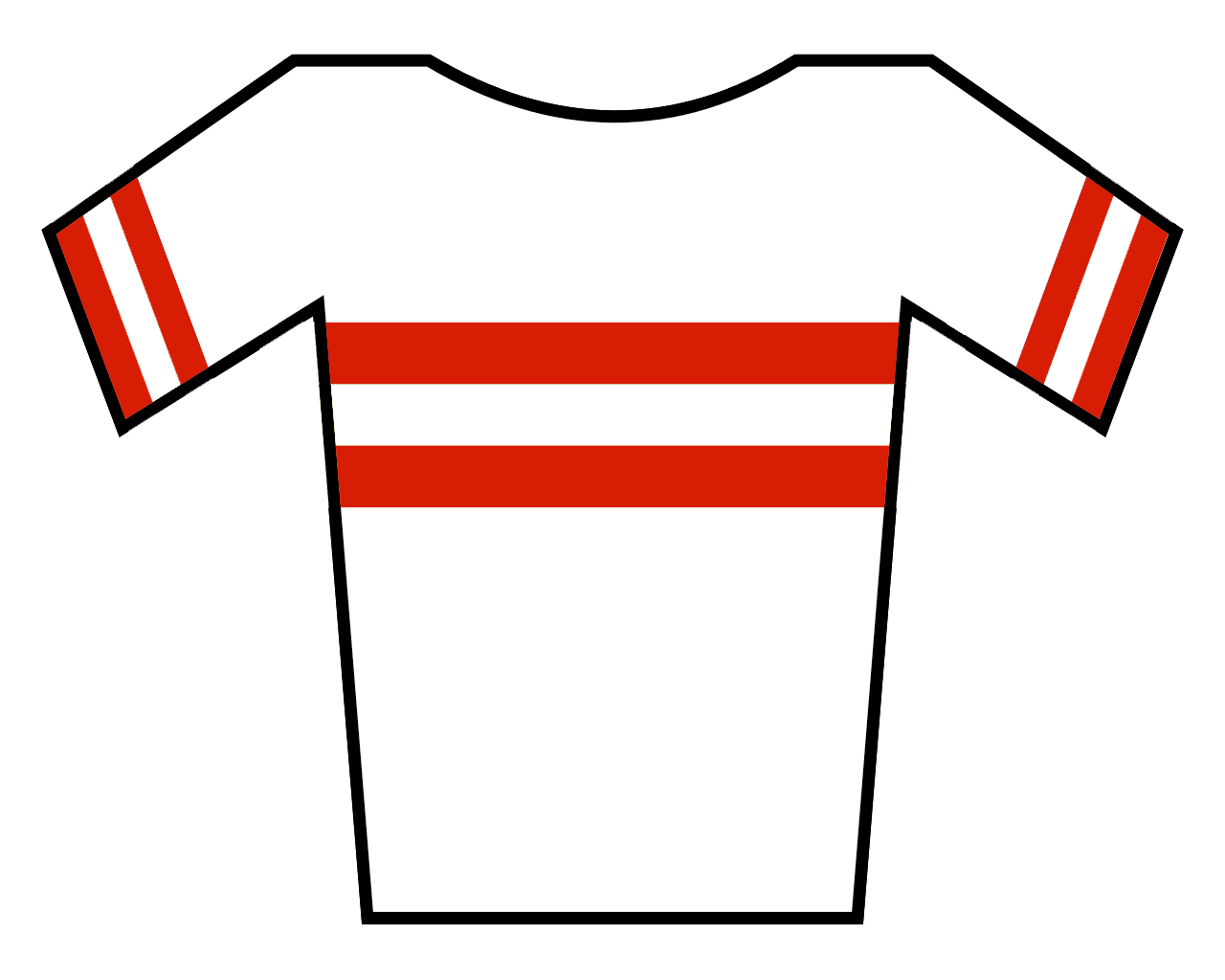
The Champion's Jersey

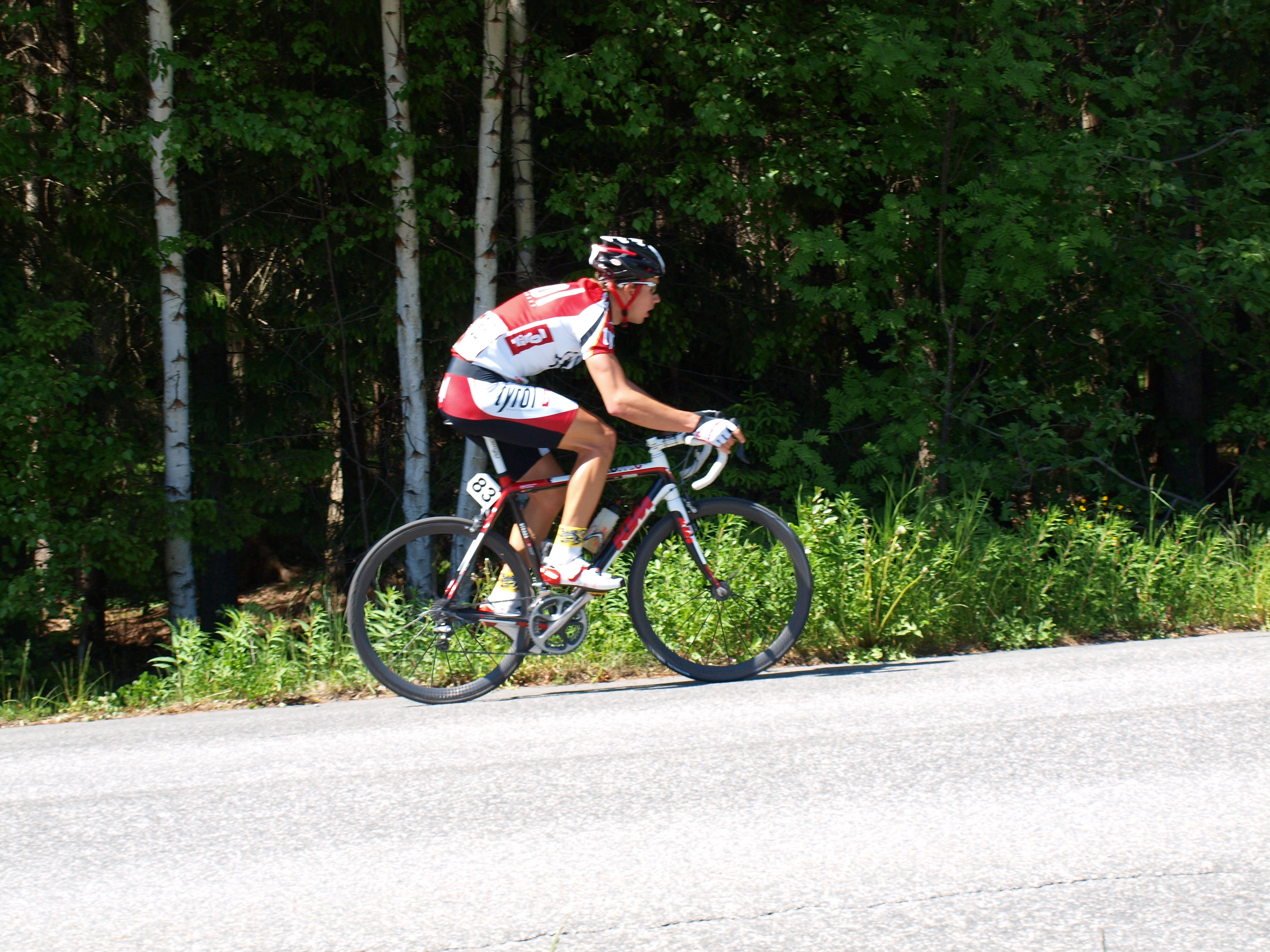
Matthias Krizek

The Austrian National Road Race Championship is a cycling race where the Austrian cyclists decide who will become the champion for the year to come.

The winners of each event are awarded a symbolic cycling jersey which is red and white, just like the national flag. These colours can be worn by the rider at other road racing events in the country to show their status as national champion. The champion's stripes can be combined into a sponsored rider's team kit designed for this purpose.

== Multiple winners ==
=== Men ===
Wins	Name	Years
2	Georg Postl	1969, 1970
2	Sigi Denk	1971, 1974
2	Herbert Spindler	1976, 1978
2	Peter Muckenhuber	1980, 1982
2	Mario Traxl	1989, 1994
2	Josef Lontscharitsch	1995, 1998
2	Georg Totschnig	1997, 2003
2	Christian Pfannberger	2007, 2008
2	Riccardo Zoidl	2013, 2014
2	Lukas Pöstlberger	2012, 2018
2	Patrick Konrad	2019, 2021

=== Women ===
Wins	Name	Years
5	Andrea Graus	2005, 2010, 2011, 2012, 2013
3	Andrea Purner-Koschier	1992, 2000, 2001
3	Tanja Klein	1995, 1996, 1998
3	Christiane Soeder	2004, 2006, 2009
2	Silvia Nenning	1990, 1991
2	Martina Ritter	2015, 2017
2	Anna Kiesenhofer	2019, 2024
2	Kathrin Schweinberger	2020, 2021

== Men ==
=== Elite ===
Austrian National Road Race Championships – Men's elite race
Race details
- Region: Austria
- Discipline: Road bicycle racing
- Type: One-day

History
- First edition: 1969
- First winner: Georg Postl
- Most wins: 11 riders with 2 wins (Note: The two-time winners are Sigi Denk, Patrick Konrad, Josef Lontscharitsch, Peter Muckenhuber, Christian Pfannberger, Georg Postl, Lukas Pöstlberger, Herbert Spindler, Georg Totschnig, Mario Traxl and Riccardo Zoidl.)
- Most recent: Alexander Hajek

Year	Gold	Silver	Bronze
1969	Georg Postl	Ludwig Kretz	Rudolf Kretz
1970	Georg Postl	Roman Hummenberger	Ludwig Kretz
1971	Sigi Denk	Georg Postl	Kurt Schattelbauer
1972	Herbert Füzi	Sigi Denk	Kurt Schattelbauer
1973	Kurt Schattelbauer	Leo Karner	Rupert Preuer
1974	Sigi Denk	Franz Inthaler	Wolfgang Priglhofer
1975	Ludwig Kretz	Werner Kuhn	Wolfgang Steinmayr
1976	Herbert Spindler	Erich Jagsch	Roman Hummenberger
1977	Johann Summer	Leopold König	Peter Muckenhuber
1978	Herbert Spindler	Leo Karner	Peter Muckenhuber
1979	Manfred Horvath		Kurt Zellhofer
1980	Peter Muckenhuber	Karl Krenauer	Helmut Wechselberger
1981	Not held		
1982	Peter Muckenhuber	Herbert Spindler	Johan Traxler
1983	Johann Lienhart	Johan Traxler	Erich Jagsch
1984	Helmut Wechselberger	Peter Muckenhuber	Karl Krenauer
1985	Bernhard Rassinger	Herbert Spindler	Harald Blumel
1986	Paul Popp	Harald Blumel	Arno Wohlfahrter
1987	Arno Wohlfahrter	Helmut Wechselberger	Mario Traxl
1988	Albert Hainz	Norbert Kostel	Armin Purner
1989	Mario Traxl	Peter Lammer	Josef Lontscharitsch
1990	Heinz Hechenberger	Peter Lammer	Christian Eminger
1991	Armin Purner	Anton Lorenz	Andreas Langl
1992	Richard Schmied	Andreas Müller	Heinz Marchel
1993	Peter Luttenberger	Markus Pinggera	Albin Kern
1994	Mario Traxl	Dietmar Hauer	Richard Schmied
1995	Josef Lontscharitsch	Paul Haschka	Gerrit Glomser
1996	Heinz Marchel	Hannes Hempel	Georg Totschnig
1997	Georg Totschnig	Harald Morscher	Thomas Mühlbacher
1998	Josef Lontscharitsch	Peter Wrolich	Berndt Grabner
1999	Hannes Hempel	Peter Wrolich	Arno Kaspret
2000	Werner Riebenbauer	Thomas Mühlbacher	Bernhard Gugganig
2001	Jürgen Pauritsch	Gerrit Glomser	Hans-Peter Obwaller
2002	René Haselbacher	Harald Morscher	Martin Fischerlehner
2003	Georg Totschnig	René Haselbacher	Andreas Matzbacher
2004	Harald Morscher	Christian Pfannberger	Georg Totschnig
2005	Gerrit Glomser	Gerhard Trampusch	Hans-Peter Obwaller
2006	Bernhard Kohl	Harald Morscher	Georg Totschnig
2007	Christian Pfannberger	Markus Eibegger	Thomas Rohregger
2008	Christian Pfannberger	Hans-Peter Obwaller	Stefan Rucker
2009	Markus Eibegger	Martin Schöffmann	Bernhard Eisel
2010	Harald Starzengruber	Harald Totschnig	Josef Kugler
2011	Matthias Krizek	Riccardo Zoidl	Andreas Hofer
2012	Lukas Pöstlberger	Josef Benetseder	Matthias Krizek
2013	Riccardo Zoidl	Stefan Denifl	Harald Totschnig
2014	Riccardo Zoidl	Gregor Mühlberger	Bernhard Eisel
2015	Marco Haller	Matthias Krizek	Daniel Schorn
2016	Matthias Brändle	Gregor Mühlberger	Michael Gogl
2017	Gregor Mühlberger	Lukas Pöstlberger	Michael Gogl
2018	Lukas Pöstlberger	Felix Großschartner	Georg Preidler
2019	Patrick Konrad	Michael Gogl	Gregor Mühlberger
2020	Valentin Götzinger	Daniel Federspiel	Michael Gogl
2021	Patrick Konrad	Marco Haller	Patrick Gamper
2022	Felix Großschartner	Patrick Gamper	Lukas Pöstlberger
2023	Gregor Mühlberger	Patrick Gamper	Lukas Pöstlberger
2024	Alexander Hajek	Gregor Mühlberger	Felix Großschartner
2025	Tim Wafler	Felix Großschartner	Tobias Bayer
2026	Michael Gogl	Felix Großschartner	Marco Schrettl

=== U23 ===
Year	Gold	Silver	Bronze
1998	Kurt Schwarzlmüller	Florian Wiesinger	Valentin Zeller
1999	Ralph Scherzer	Gerhard Trampusch	Christian Hölzl
2000	Harald Starzengruber	Christian Pfannberger	Patrick Kofler
2001	Christian Pfannberger	Stefan Rucker	Andreas Matzbacher
2002	Bernhard Kohl	Bernhard Eisel	Clemens Grosslercher
2003	Andreas Matzbacher	Bernhard Kohl	Josef Benetseder
2004	Michael Pichler	Markus Eibegger	Josef Benetseder
2005	Markus Eibegger	Christian Ebner	Christian Lener
2006	Matthias Schröger	Clemens Fankhauser	Marco Leonardo Oreggia
2007	Stefan Denifl	Matthias Schröger	Clemens Fankhauser
2008	Martin Schöffmann	Stefan Poll	Christoph Sokoll
2009	Martin Schöffmann	Franz Grassmann	Stefan Denifl
2010	Matthias Krizek	Stephan Rabitsch	Dominik Hrinkow
2011	Andreas Hofer	Patrick Konrad	Georg Preidler
2012	Lukas Pöstlberger	Stephan Rabitsch	David Wöhrer
2013	Lukas Pöstlberger	Paul Lang	Daniel Biedermann
2014	Gregor Mühlberger	Maximilian Kuen	Sebastian Schönberger
2015	Michael Gogl	Gregor Mühlberger	Felix Großschartner
2016	Gregor Mühlberger	Patrick Bosman	Lukas Schlemmer
2017	Lukas Schlemmer	Benjamin Brkic	Marcel Neuhauser
2018	Felix Gall	Florian Kierner	Marcel Neuhauser
2019	Tobias Bayer	Markus Wildauer	Moran Vermeulen
2020	Valentin Götzinger	Alexander Gratzer	Fabian Steininger
2021	Tobias Bayer	Valentin Götzinger	Mario Gamper
2022	Sebastian Putz	Martin Messner	—N/a

== Women ==
=== Elite ===
Austrian National Road Race Championships – Women's elite race
Race details
- Region: Austria
- Discipline: Road bicycle racing
- Type: One-day

History
- First edition: 1990
- First winner: Silvia Nenning
- Most wins: Andrea Graus (5 wins)
- Most recent: Anna Kiesenhofer

Year	Gold	Silver	Bronze
1990	Silvia Nenning	Silvia Hauser	
1991	Silvia Nenning	Johanna Hack	Brigitte Felber
1992	Andrea Purner-Koschier	Birgit Hausmann	Doris Reitener
1993	Christiane Koschier-Bitante	Sandra Pachner	Silvia Hauser
1994	Silvia Hauser	Michaela Brunngraber	Christiane Koschier-Bitante
1995	Tanja Klein	Brigitte Krebs	Cornelia Sulzer
1996	Tanja Klein	Brigitte Krebs	Johanna Freysinger
1997	Johanna Freysinger	Brigitte Krebs	Andrea Graus
1998	Tanja Klein	Caroline Dietmann	Brigitte Krebs
1999	Ulrike Baumgartner	Isabella Wieser	Andrea Graus
2000	Andrea Purner-Koschier	Ulrike Baumgartner	Andrea Graus
2001	Andrea Purner-Koschier	Andrea Graus	Doris Posch
2002	Isabella Wieser	Andrea Graus	Karin Wieser
2003	Bernadette Schober	Andrea Graus	Doris Posch
2004	Christiane Soeder	Isabella Wieser	Andrea Graus
2005	Andrea Graus	Christiane Soeder	Bernadette Schober
2006	Christiane Soeder	Andrea Graus	Monika Schachl
2007	Daniela Pintarelli	Bärbel Jungmeier	Veronika Sprügl
2008	Monika Schachl	Daniela Pintarelli	Jacqueline Hahn
2009	Christiane Soeder	Daniela Pintarelli	Jacqueline Hahn
2010	Andrea Graus	Daniela Pintarelli	Jacqueline Hahn
2011	Andrea Graus	Elisabeth Reiner	Karin Pekovits
2012	Andrea Graus	Martina Ritter	Daniela Pintarelli
2013	Andrea Graus	Martina Ritter	Eva Wutti
2014	Jacqueline Hahn	Christina Perchtold	Martina Ritter
2015	Martina Ritter	Daniela Pintarelli	Christina Perchtold
2016	Christina Perchtold	Martina Ritter	Sarah Rijkes
2017	Martina Ritter	Christina Perchtold	Barbara Mayer
2018	Sarah Rijkes	Barbara Mayer	Angelika Tazreiter
2019	Anna Kiesenhofer	Angelika Tazreiter	Kathrin Schweinberger
2020	Kathrin Schweinberger	Sarah Rijkes	Veronika Windisch
2021	Kathrin Schweinberger	Verena Eberhardt	Christina Schweinberger
2022	Christina Schweinberger	Anna Kiesenhofer	Kathrin Schweinberger
2023	Carina Schrempf	Lisa Peterer	Kathrin Schweinberger
2024	Anna Kiesenhofer	Valentina Cavallar	Christina Schweinberger
