= Eschborn–Frankfurt Under-23 =

German one-day road cycling race

Eschborn-Frankfurt City Loop U23
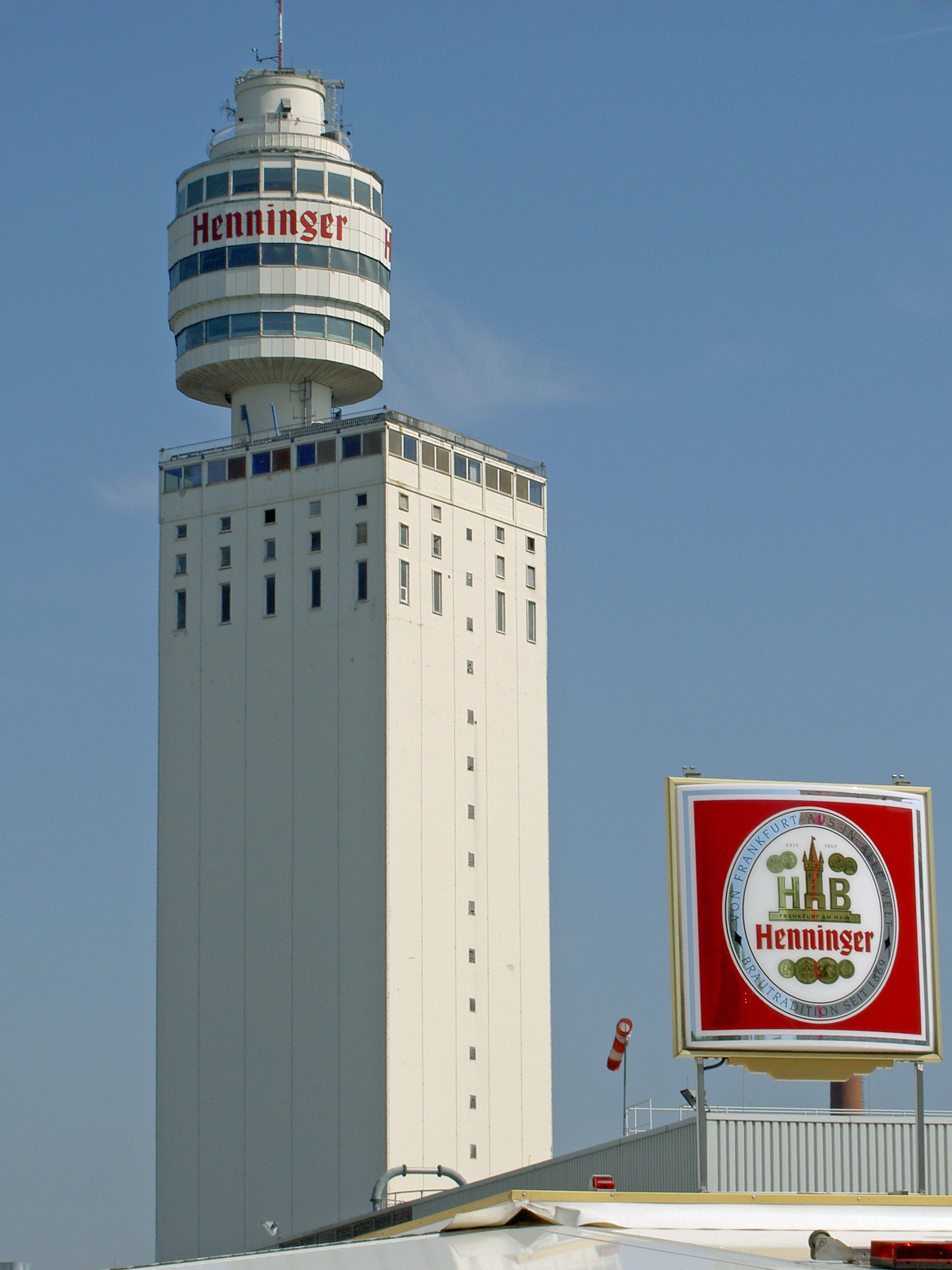

Race details
- Date: May
- Region: Frankfurt, Germany
- Discipline: Road race
- Competition: UCI Europe Tour
- Type: One day race
- Web site: www.eschborn-frankfurt.de/de/home/u23-rennen

History
- First edition: 1998
- Editions: 21 (as of 2025)
- First winner: Raphael Schweda (GER)
- Most wins: No repeat winners
- Most recent: Conrad Haugsted (DEN)

Eschborn–Frankfurt U23 is a road bicycle race held annually in Germany. It is organized as a 1.2U category event on the UCI Europe Tour, and is the under-23 version of Eschborn–Frankfurt.

== Winners ==
Year	Winner	Second	Third
1998	(Germany) Raphael Schweda	(Switzerland) Stefan Rütimann	(Switzerland) Marcel Strauss
1999	(Germany) Stephan Schreck	(Austria) Jochen Summer	(Germany) Markus Wilfurth
2000	(Germany) Torsten Hiekmann	(Germany) Dirk Reichl	(Denmark) Thomas Bruun Eriksen
2001	(Germany) David Kopp	(Germany) Dirk Reichl	(Austria) Christian Pfannberger
2002	(Austria) Bernhard Kohl	(Austria) Stefan Rucker	(Germany) Steffen Lockan
2003	(Russia) Denis Titschenko	(Germany) Markus Fothen	(Denmark) Brian Vandborg
2004	(Netherlands) Marc de Maar	(Netherlands) Thomas Dekker	(Netherlands) Bastiaan Giling
2005–2007	No race		
2008	(Austria) Stefan Denifl	(Austria) Christoph Sokoll	(Germany) Jean Schlüter
2009	(Australia) Jack Bobridge	(Austria) Daniel Schorn	(Austria) Matthias Brändle
2010	(Germany) Tino Thömel	(Netherlands) Wesley Kreder	(Switzerland) Loïc Aubert
2011	(Germany) Patrick Bercz	(Germany) Florian Scheit	(Netherlands) Maurits Lammertink
2012	(Norway) Sven Erik Bystrøm	(Denmark) Michael Valgren	(Netherlands) Maurits Lammertink
2013	(Denmark) Lasse Norman Hansen	(Denmark) Michael Valgren	(Germany) Maximilian Werda
2014	(Denmark) Mads Pedersen	(Germany) Nils Politt	(Norway) Sven Erik Bystrøm
2015	No race		
2016	(Germany) Konrad Geßner	(Belgium) Benjamin Declercq	(Belgium) Christophe Noppe
2017	(Netherlands) Fabio Jakobsen	(Denmark) Casper Pedersen	(Switzerland) Patrick Müller
2018	(Denmark) Niklas Larsen	(Germany) Jonas Rutsch	(Netherlands) Marten Kooistra
2019	(Denmark) Frederik Rodenberg	(Australia) Kaden Groves	(United Kingdom) Jake Stewart
2020–2022	No race		
2023	(Denmark) Joshua Gudnitz	(Denmark) Gustav Wang	(Eritrea) Aklilu Arefayne
2024	(Netherlands) Wessel Mouris	(Denmark) Peter Øxenberg Hansen	(Denmark) Alexander Arnt Hansen
2025	(Denmark) Conrad Haugsted	(Denmark) Mads Landbo	(United Kingdom) Tomos Pattinson
