= Totschnig =

Totschnig is a German surname. Notable people with the surname include:

- Brigitte Totschnig (born 1954), Austrian skier
- Georg Totschnig (born 1971), Austrian cyclist
- Harald Totschnig (born 1974), Austrian cyclist
