= Purner =

Purner or Pürner is a surname. Notable people with the name include:

- Andrea Purner-Koschier (born 1972), Austrian cyclist
- Armin Purner, Austrian cyclist
- Friedrich Pürner (born 1967), German politician
- Oscar Purner (1873–1915), American baseball pitcher
- Siegfried Purner (1915–1944), Austrian handball player

== See also ==
- Purne
