= Sarah Rijkes =

Austrian cyclist (born 1991)

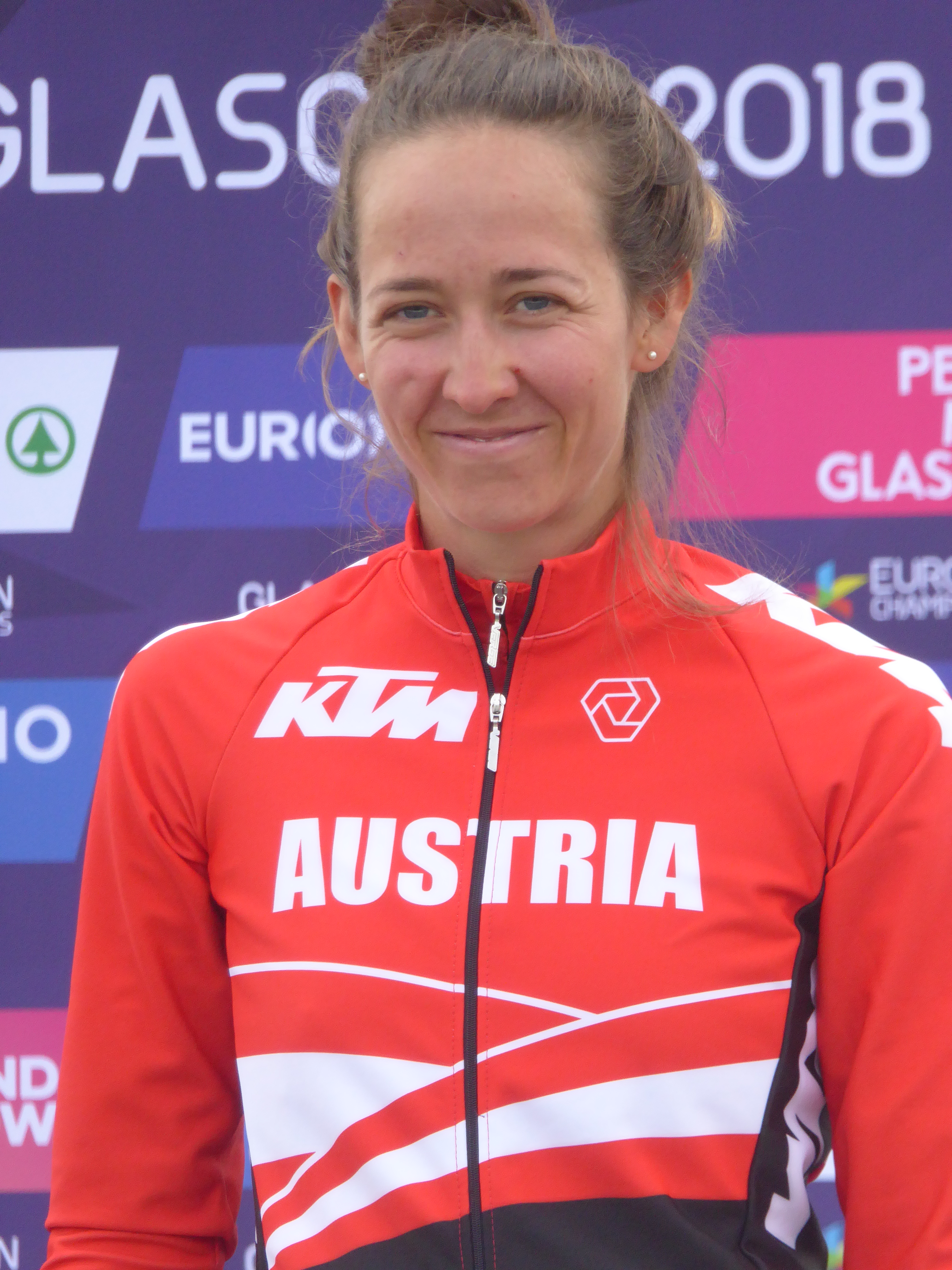
- Rijkes at the 2018 European Road Cycling Championships.

Personal information
- Full name: Sarah Rijkes
- Born: 2 April 1991 (age 35) Waidhofen an der Ybbs, Austria

Cycling career
- Sport: Cycling
- Discipline: Road
- Role: Rider
- Rider type: All-rounder

Amateur team
- 2009–2012: ARBÖ Löffler Ladies Team

Professional teams
- 2013: Squadra Scappatella
- 2014–2015: Lotto–Belisol Ladies
- 2016–2017: Lares–Waowdeals
- 2018: Experza–Footlogix
- 2019–2021: WNT–Rotor Pro Cycling
- 2022: Andy Schleck–CP NVST–Immo Losch

Sarah Rijkes (born 2 April 1991) is a former Austrian professional racing cyclist, who last rode for UCI Women's Continental Team Andy Schleck–CP NVST–Immo Losch. She is an all-rounder with a preference for hilly stage races.

== Career ==
Born in Waidhofen an der Ybbs, Rijkes came to competitive cycling through her Dutch father. As her first Elite racing team she joined the Austrian ARBÖ Löffler Ladies Team from her hometown Waidhofen an der Ybbs, where her mother worked as a team official. Her first professional team was the Austrian outlet Squadra Scappatella, which she joined in 2013. Only a few months after the season started, Rijkes suffered a major setback as she crashed heavily at the Tour of Chongming Island world cup race in China and missed almost the entire season, not returning to racing before September. Despite her unlucky season, Rijkes managed to get her first professional contract abroad in 2014 when she joined the Lotto–Belisol Ladies team in Belgium. During her time at Lotto–Belisol Ladies, she also rode as a guest rider for several other teams. After two years, Rijkes stayed in Belgium, this time signing for Lares–Waowdeals in 2016.

Rijkes competed for Austria in the road races of the 2015 UCI Road World Championships in Richmond, where she did not finish, and the 2016 UCI Road World Championships in Doha, where she finished 63rd.

== Personal life ==
Rijkes has a Dutch surname with her father being from the Netherlands. She is fluent in Dutch. Besides her career in professional cycling she is currently also studying biology.

== Major results ==
2008
3rd Time trial, National Junior Road Championships
2009
2nd Time trial, National Junior Road Championships
2011
2nd Time trial, National Under-23 Road Championships
2012
2nd Time trial, National Under-23 Road Championships
2014
National Road Championships

4th Time trial
5th Road race

2016
3rd Road race, National Road Championships
2018
1st Road race, National Road Championships
2019
National Road Championships

3rd Time trial
5th Road race

9th V4 Ladies Series - Restart Zalaegerszeg
2020
National Road Championships

2nd Road Race
4th Time trial

2021
4th Road race, National Road Championships
2022
4th Road race, National Road Championships
6th Visegrad 4 Ladies Series - Hungary
10th Visegrad 4 Ladies Race Slovakia
