= Martin Schöffmann =

Austrian racing cyclist (born 1987)

Personal information
- Born: 31 March 1987 (age 39) Leoben, Austria

Cycling career
- Sport: Cycling
- Discipline: Road
- Role: Rider

Professional teams
- 2008: RC Arbö–Wels–Gourmetfein
- 2009: Elk Haus
- 2010: Vorarlberg–Corratec
- 2011–2014: WSA Viperbike
- 2015: Team Felbermayr–Simplon Wels

Martin Schöffmann (born 31 March 1987, in Leoben) is an Austrian racing cyclist who last rode for Team Felbermayr–Simplon Wels. He is in a relationship with Nathalie Birli.

== Palmares ==
2008
1st Under-23 National Road Race Championships
2009
1st Under-23 National Road Race Championships
1st National Hillclimb Championships
2nd National Race Championships
8th Eschborn-Frankfurt City Loop U23
2011
1st Grand Prix Betonexpressz 2000
2012
2nd Overall Oberösterreichrundfahrt
9th Ljubljana–Zagreb
2014
10th Raiffeisen Grand Prix
