= Bernadette Schober =

Austrian cyclist

Personal information
- Born: 15 July 1984 (age 42) Austria

Cycling career
- Sport: Cycling
- Discipline: Road cycling

Professional teams
- 2008–2009: Team Uniqa
- 2010–2011: Kuota Speed Kueens

Bernadette Schober (born 15 July 1984) is a road cyclist from Austria. She won the Austrian National Road Race Championships in 2003. She represented her nation at the 2005 and 2006 UCI Road World Championships.
