= Pauritsch =

Pauritsch (Croatian: Paurić) is an Austrian surname of South Slavic origin.

Notable people with the surname include:

- Jürgen Pauritsch (born 1977), Austrian former cyclist
- Rene Pauritsch (born 1964), Austrian football manager and former player
