= Squadra Scappatella =

Austrian cycling team

Team information
- UCI code: RCE (2004–2005); EHN (2006–2008); TUE (2009); KSK (2010–2012); SCS (2013)
- Registered: Austria (2004–2013)
- Founded: 2004
- Disbanded: 2013
- Discipline: Road
- Status: UCI Women's Team (2004–2013)
- Bicycles: Kuota

Team name history
- 2004 2005 2006 2007–2008 2009 2010–2011 2012 2013: RC Elk–Haus Tirol; ELK Haus–Tirol Noe; ELK Haus–Nö; Elk Haus; Team Uniqa Elk; Kuota Speed Kueens; Scappa Speed Queens; Squadra Scappatella

Squadra Scappatella (UCI team code: SCS) was a professional continental cycling team based in Austria and participated in professional cycling team, which competed in elite road bicycle racing events such as the UCI Women's Road World Cup.

In preparation for the 2009 season, the team merged with fellow Austrian squad: Team Uniqa.

== Major wins ==
2005
Stage 2 Tour de Feminin – Krásná Lípa, Andrea Graus

2011
Stage 5 Tour de Feminin – O cenu Českého Švýcarska, Romy Kasper

== National champions ==
2005
Austria Road Race, Andrea Graus

2007
Czech Road Race, Martina Růžičková
Slovakia Time Trial, Katarína Uhláriková

2008
Czech Road Race, Martina Růžičková
Slovakia Time Trial, Katarína Uhláriková

2009
Luxembourg Road Race, Nathalie Lamborelle
Czech Road Race, Martina Růžičková

2013
Hungary Time Trial, Mónika Király

== Rosters ==
=== 2008 ===
Ages as of 1 January 2008.

Rider	Date of birth
Martina Růžičková (CZE)	March 22, 1980 (aged 27)
Pelin Cizgin (AUT)	April 29, 1986 (aged 21)
Katarína Uhláriková (SVK)	February 9, 1988 (aged 19)
Katharina Blum (GER)	October 24, 1984 (aged 23)
Stefanie Degle (GER)	October 19, 1986 (aged 21)

Rider	Date of birth
Manuela Grunzweil (AUT)	April 12, 1980 (aged 27)
Chrisabel Prischl (AUT)	September 27, 1983 (aged 24)
Karin Pauer (AUT)	October 10, 1978 (aged 29)
Mette Fischer Andreasen (DEN)	April 13, 1983 (aged 24)
Lisa Maria Degle (GER)	December 21, 1988 (aged 19)

=== 2013 ===
Ages as of 1 January 2013.

Rider	Date of birth
Victoria Domitner (AUT)	October 18, 1994 (aged 18)
Daniela Gass (GER)	5 November 1980 (age 45)
Julia Hilber (AUT)	18 September 1994 (age 31)
Mónika Király (HUN)	November 10, 1983 (aged 29)
Miriam Kircher (AUT)	24 February 1992 (age 34)
Christina Perchtold (AUT)	11 May 1993 (age 33)
Daniela Pintarelli (AUT)	10 November 1983 (age 42)

Rider	Date of birth
Larissa Ratkic (AUT)	30 January 1994 (age 32)
Elisabeth Reiner (AUT)	September 21, 1983 (aged 29)
Iris Riepan (AUT)	10 April 1990 (age 36)
Sarah Rijkes (AUT)	April 2, 1991 (aged 21)
Claudia Schlager (AUT)	13 March 1968 (age 58)
Barbara Tesar (AUT)	2 March 1982 (age 44)
