= Marchel =

Marchel is a surname. Notable people with the surname include:

- Andrzej Marchel (1964–2025), Polish footballer
- Heinz Marchel (born 1967), Austrian cyclist
