= Ulrich Baumgartner =

Ulrich Baumgartner may refer to several prominent Austrian and German historical figures, including:

== People named Ulrich Baumgartner ==
- Ulrich Baumgartner (cultural manager), former artistic director of the Wiener Festwochen
- Ulrich Baumgartner (cabinet maker), 17th century joiner responsible for the Pomeranian Art Cabinet, and father of Melchior Baumgartner

== Others with similar names ==
- Ulrike Baumgartner (born 1974), former cyclist
