= Nathalie Birli =

Austrian cyclist

Personal information
- Born: 27 June 1992 (age 34)

Cycling career
- Sport: Cycling
- Role: Rider

Nathalie Birli (born 27 June 1992) is an Austrian professional racing cyclist who rides for Vitalogic Astrokalb Radunion Nö. She is in a relationship with Martin Schöffmann and they have a child together.

According to her account, on 23 July 2019 she was abducted after a man deliberately knocked her from her bike and held her at knifepoint in his home. After attempting to suffocate and then drown her, Birli managed to engage him in conversation and convince him to let her go. He drove her home where her partner, Martin Schöffmann, called police. The police then tracked her bike back to the alleged abductor's home and arrested him.

== See also ==
- List of 2016 UCI Women's Teams and riders
- List of kidnappings (2010–2019)
