= Harald Morscher =

Austrian cyclist

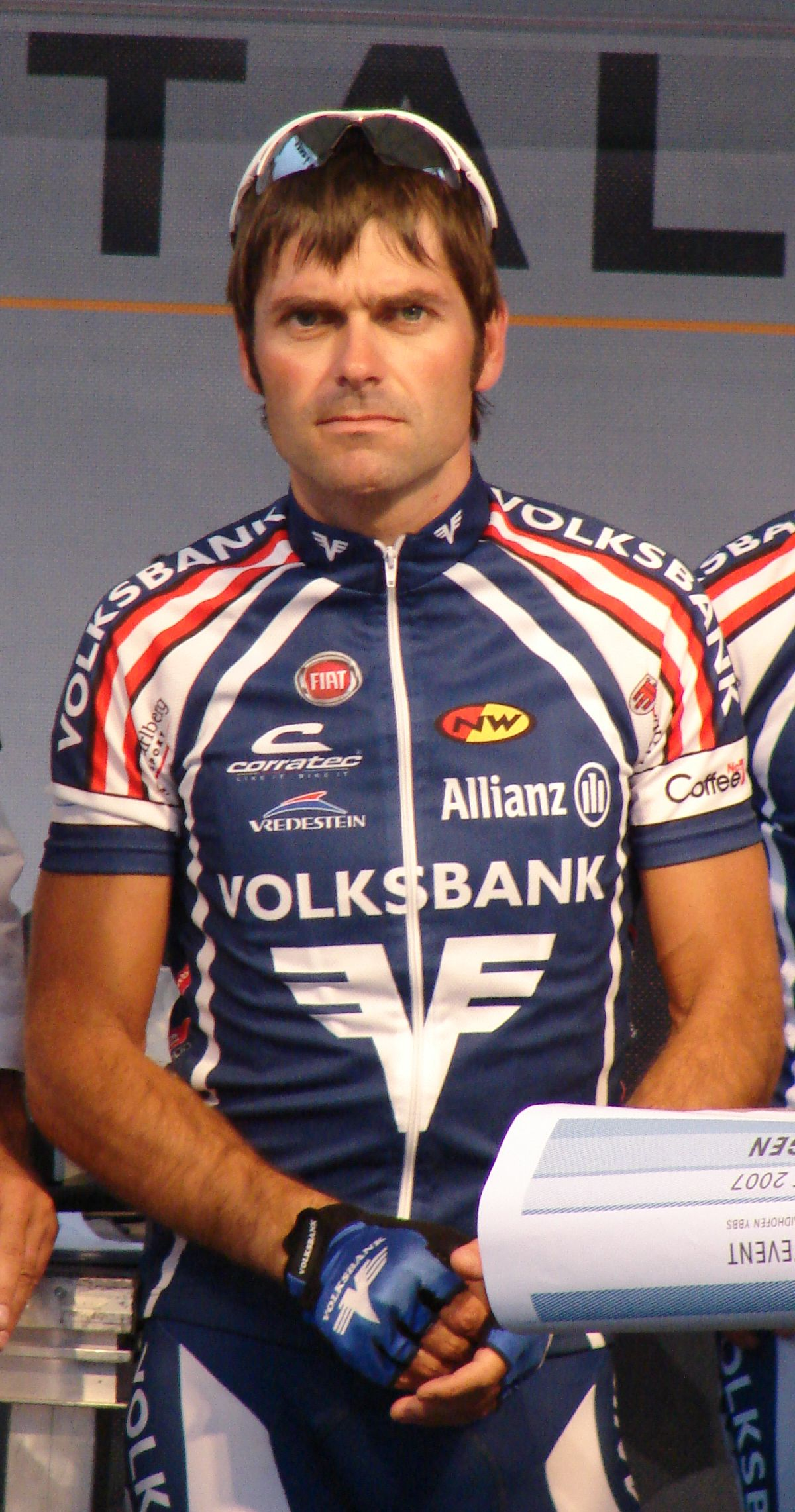
- Morscher in 2007

Personal information
- Full name: Harald Morscher
- Born: 22 June 1972 (age 54) Hohenems, Austria

Cycling career
- Sport: Cycling
- Current team: Retired
- Discipline: Road
- Role: Rider

Professional teams
- 1998: Saeco–Cannondale
- 2000: Nurnberger
- 2003: Elk Haus Radteam–Sportunion Schrems
- 2004–2009: Volksbank–Ideal Leingrüber

Harald Morscher (born 22 June 1972) is an Austrian former professional cyclist. He competed in the men's individual road race at the 1996 Summer Olympics. He also won the Austrian National Road Race Championships in 2004.

== Major results ==
1994
1st Overall Tour of Austria

1st Stage 2

1997
2nd Road race, National Road Championships
2000
1st Stage 5 3-Länder-Tour
1st Stage 3 Tour du Poitou-Charentes
2001
1st Stage 6 Tour de Normandie
1st Stage 6 Tour of Austria
2005
1st GP Innsbruck
2006
2nd Road race, National Road Championships
