= Silvia Nenning =

Austrian cyclist

Personal information
- Born: 3 September 1968 (age 58)

Cycling career
- Sport: Cycling

Silvia Nenning (3 September 1968) is an Austrian former cyclist. She won the Austrian National Road Race Championships in 1990 and 1991.
