= Peter Muckenhuber =

Austrian cyclist (born 1955)

Personal information
- Born: 16 February 1955 (age 71) Salzburg, Austria

Cycling career
- Sport: Cycling

Peter Muckenhuber (born 16 February 1955) is an Austrian former cyclist. He competed at the 1980 Summer Olympics and the 1984 Summer Olympics. He won the Austrian National Road Race Championships in 1980 and 1982.
