= Silvia Hauser =

Austrian cyclist

Personal information
- Nickname: Silvia Hauser

Cycling career
- Sport: Cycling

Silvia Hauser is an Austrian former cyclist. She won the Austrian National Road Race Championships in 1994.
