= Christina Perchtold =

Austrian cyclist

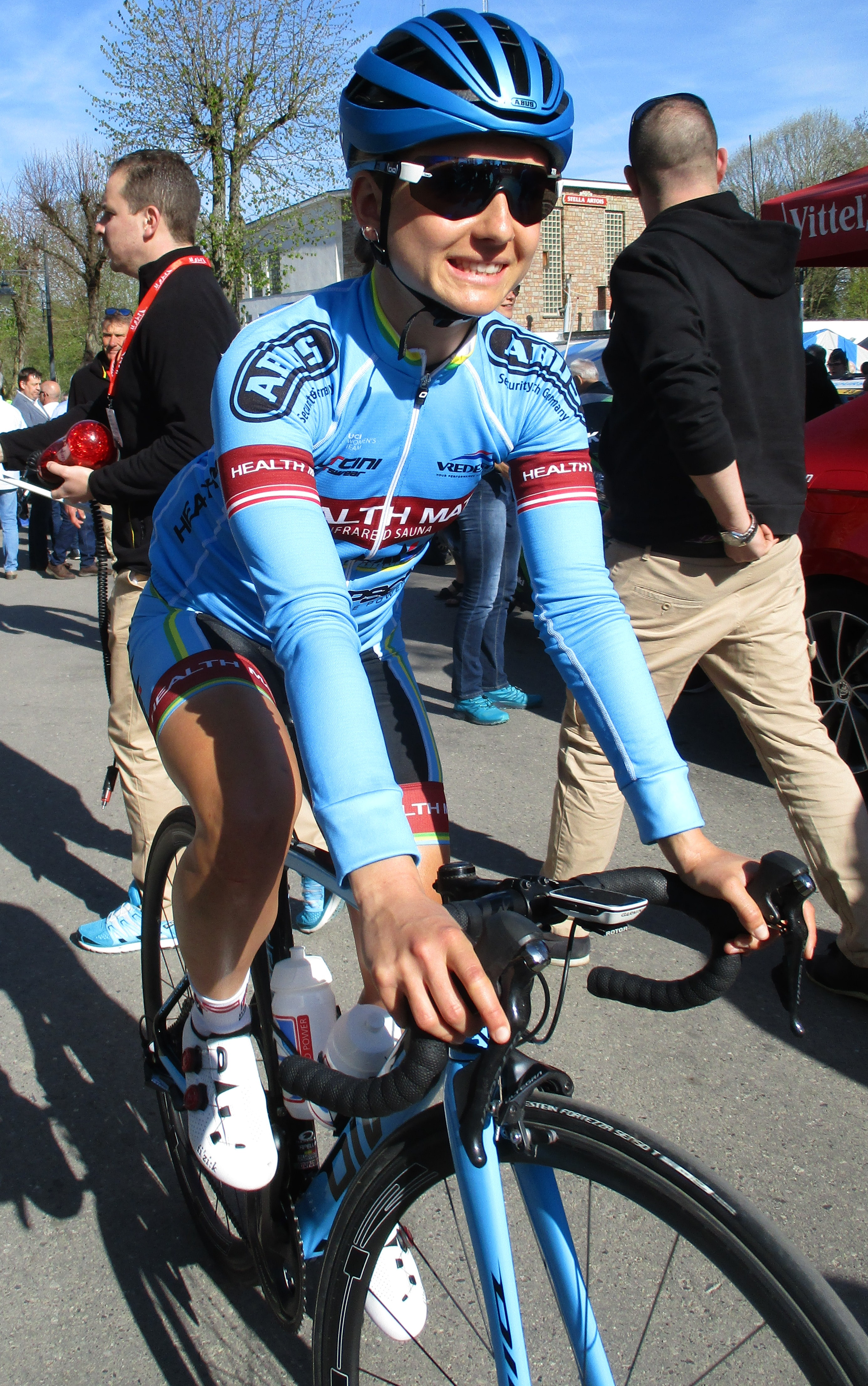
- Perchtold at the 2018 La Flèche Wallonne Féminine

Personal information
- Full name: Christina Perchtold
- Born: 11 May 1993 (age 33) Klagenfurt, Austria
- Height: 160 cm (5 ft 3 in)

Cycling career
- Sport: Cycling
- Discipline: Road
- Role: Rider
- Rider type: Sprinter

Amateur teams
- ?: RC Grafenstein
- 2010–2011: Kuota Speed Kueens (junior)

Professional teams
- 2012–2013: Scappa Speed Queens
- 2014–2016: NÖ RadUnion Vitalogic
- 2017: Cervélo–Bigla Pro Cycling
- 2018–2019: Health Mate–Cyclelive Team

Major wins
- One day races & Classics National Road Race Championships (2016)

Christina Perchtold (born 11 May 1993) is an Austrian professional racing cyclist, who most recently rode for UCI Women's Team Health Mate–Cyclelive Team. Born in Klagenfurt, Perchtold is a sprinter that is also capable of surviving short climbs and was the winner of the Austrian National Road Race Championships in 2016.

== Career ==
Perchtold started competing in cycling in 1998 and in her early years rode for local club RC Grafenstein in her hometown of Klagenfurt. At the age of 18 she joined the Austrian professional team Kuota Speed Kueens as a junior rider and immediately showed great talent and sprinting qualities in both national and international races. In 2011 Perchtold received first international attention as a potential coming talent when she finished fifth in the junior road race at the UCI World Championships in Copenhagen. As an elite rider she remained on the same team until 2013, which in the meantime had changed names. Perchtold herself considered quitting cycling in between, not putting full focus on her career in 2013 and 2014. Nonetheless, she managed to score good results on a national level, amongst which the silver medal at the 2014 Austrian National Road Race Championships riding for NÖ RadUnion Vitalogic. After finally deciding to follow a professional career in cycling, Perchtold had her strongest year to date in 2016 where she finished third at a stage of the Giro del Trentino Alto Adige-Südtirol, winning the Austrian National Road Race Championships and being selected for Austria's team at the 2016 UCI Road World Championships in Doha, where she finished 28th.

At the end of the season, Perchtold signed a two-year contract with the Swiss Cervélo–Bigla Pro Cycling team where she was supposed to become a part of the team's sprint leadout. She left the team after one season, joining the Health Mate–Cyclelive Team for 2018.

== Personal life ==
Besides her career as a cyclist, Perchtold joined the Austrian police in 2013 and became a police officer in 2016. She is a member of the cycling cadre of the Austrian ministry of the interior.

== Major results ==
2010
3rd Road race, National Under-23 Road Championships
2011
5th Road race, UCI Junior Road World Championships
2012
3rd Time trial, National Under-23 Road Championships
2014
2nd Road race, National Road Championships
2015
3rd Road race, National Road Championships
2016
1st Road race, National Road Championships
2017
2nd Road race, National Road Championships
5th Overall Gracia–Orlová
2018
6th Overall Tour of Uppsala
2019
2nd Grand Prix Velo Alanya
