= Gerhard Trampusch =

Austrian cyclist

Personal information
- Full name: Gerhard Trampusch
- Born: 11 August 1978 (age 48) Hall in Tirol, Austria

Cycling career
- Sport: Cycling
- Current team: Retired
- Discipline: Road
- Role: Rider

Professional teams
- 1999: Gerolsteiner
- 2000–2001: Team Telekom
- 2002: Mapei–Quick-Step
- 2003: Gerolsteiner
- 2004: Acqua & Sapone
- 2005: AKUD–Arnolds Sicherheit
- 2006: Wiesenhof–AKUD
- 2007: Team Volksbank
- 2007: Swiag–Teka
- 2008–2009: Elk Haus–Simplon
- 2010–2011: RC Arbö–Gourmetfein–Wels

Gerhard Trampusch (born 11 August 1978) is an Austrian former racing cyclist. He competed in the men's individual road race at the 2004 Summer Olympics.

== Major results ==
1999
4th Overall Tour de l'Avenir

1st Points classification

4th Overall Tour of Austria
2000
4th Grand Prix du Midi Libre
7th Overall Tour of Austria
2003
2nd Uniqa Classic
2005
2nd Road race, National Road Championships
3rd Overall Tour of Austria

1st Stage 4

2006
1st Stage 2 Bayern-Rundfahrt
7th Overall Tour of Austria

=== Grand Tour general classification results timeline ===
Grand Tour	2003	2004
Giro d'Italia	40	26
Tour de France	—	63
Vuelta a España	—	—

Legend
—	Did not compete
DNF	Did not finish
