= Georg Postl =

Austrian cyclist

Personal information
- Full name: Georg Postl
- Born: Neunkirchen, Austria

Cycling career
- Sport: Cycling

Georg Postl is an Austrian former cyclist. He won the Austrian National Road Race Championships in 1969 and 1970.
