= Kurt Schattelbauer =

Austrian cyclist

Personal information
- Full name: Kurt Schattelbauer
- Born: 3 December 1940 Halbenrain, Styria, Austria
- Died: 11 November 2022 (aged 81) Halbenrain, Styria, Austria

Cycling career
- Sport: Cycling

Kurt Schattelbauer (3 December 1940 – 11 November 2022) was an Austrian cyclist. He won the Austrian National Road Race Championships in 1973. He was born in Graz, his profession was a farmer.
