= Christiane Koschier-Bitante =

Austrian cyclist

Personal information
- Born: 19 September 1974 (age 52) Innsbruck, Austria

Cycling career
- Sport: Cycling

Christiane Koschier-Bitante (19 September 1974) is an Austrian former cyclist. She won the Austrian National Road Race Championships in 1993.
