= Daniela Traxl-Pintarelli =

Austrian cyclist

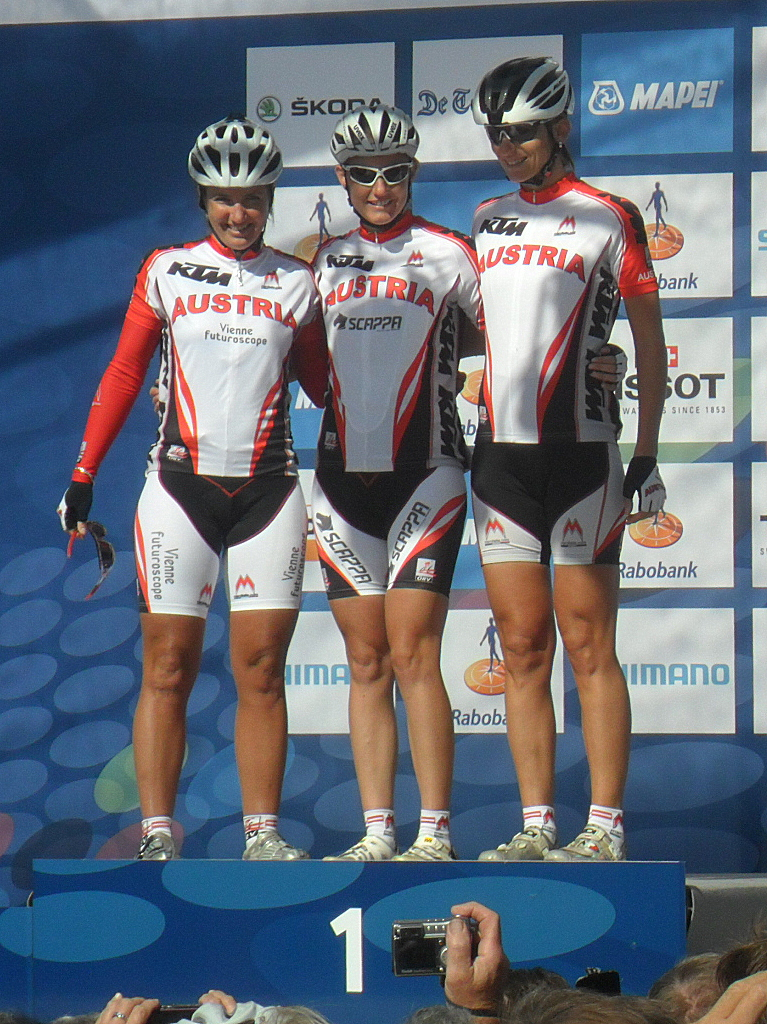
- Traxl-Pintarelli at the 2012 UCI Road World Championships

Personal information
- Full name: Daniela Traxl-Pintarelli
- Born: Daniela Pintarelli; 10 November 1983 (age 42) Landeck, Austria

Cycling career
- Sport: Cycling
- Current team: Team MooserWirt
- Discipline: Road
- Role: Rider; Team owner

Amateur teams
- 2013–: Team MooserWirt
- 2015: Maxx–Solar Cycling (guest)

Professional teams
- 2005–2008: Arbö Arkö Graz
- 2009–2013: Team Uniqa–Elk

Daniela Traxl-Pintarelli (née Pintarelli; born 10 November 1983) is an Austrian racing cyclist, and team owner. She won the Austrian National Road Race Championships in 2007. She competed in the women's road race at the UCI Road World Championships on seven occasions, between 2006 and 2013.

== Major results ==
2007
1st Road race, National Road Championships
2008
National Road Championships

2nd Road race
3rd Time trial

2009
National Road Championships

2nd Road race
2nd Time trial

2010
2nd Road race, National Road Championships
2012
3rd Road race, National Road Championships
2015
2nd Road race, National Road Championships
