= Manfred Horvath =

Austrian cyclist

Personal information
- Full name: Manfred Horvath
- Born: 1960 (age 65–66) Sollenau, Austria

Cycling career
- Sport: Cycling

Manfred Horvath (born 1960) is an Austrian former cyclist. He won the Austrian National Road Race Championships in 1979.

== Death ==
Several years after winning the championships, Horvath died of a heart attack.
