= Heinz Hechenberger =

Austrian cyclist

Personal information
- Full name: Heinz Hechenberger
- Born: 9 February 1963 (age 63)

Cycling career
- Sport: Cycling

Heinz Hechenberger (born 9 February 1963) is an Austrian former cyclist. He won the Austrian National Road Race Championships in 1990.
