= Bernhard Rassinger =

Austrian cyclist

Personal information
- Born: 30 August 1963 (age 63) Sankt Pölten, Austria

Cycling career
- Sport: Cycling

Bernhard Rassinger (30 August 1963) is an Austrian former cyclist. He won the Austrian National Road Race Championships in 1985.
