= Riccardo Zoidl =

Austrian racing cyclist (born 1988)

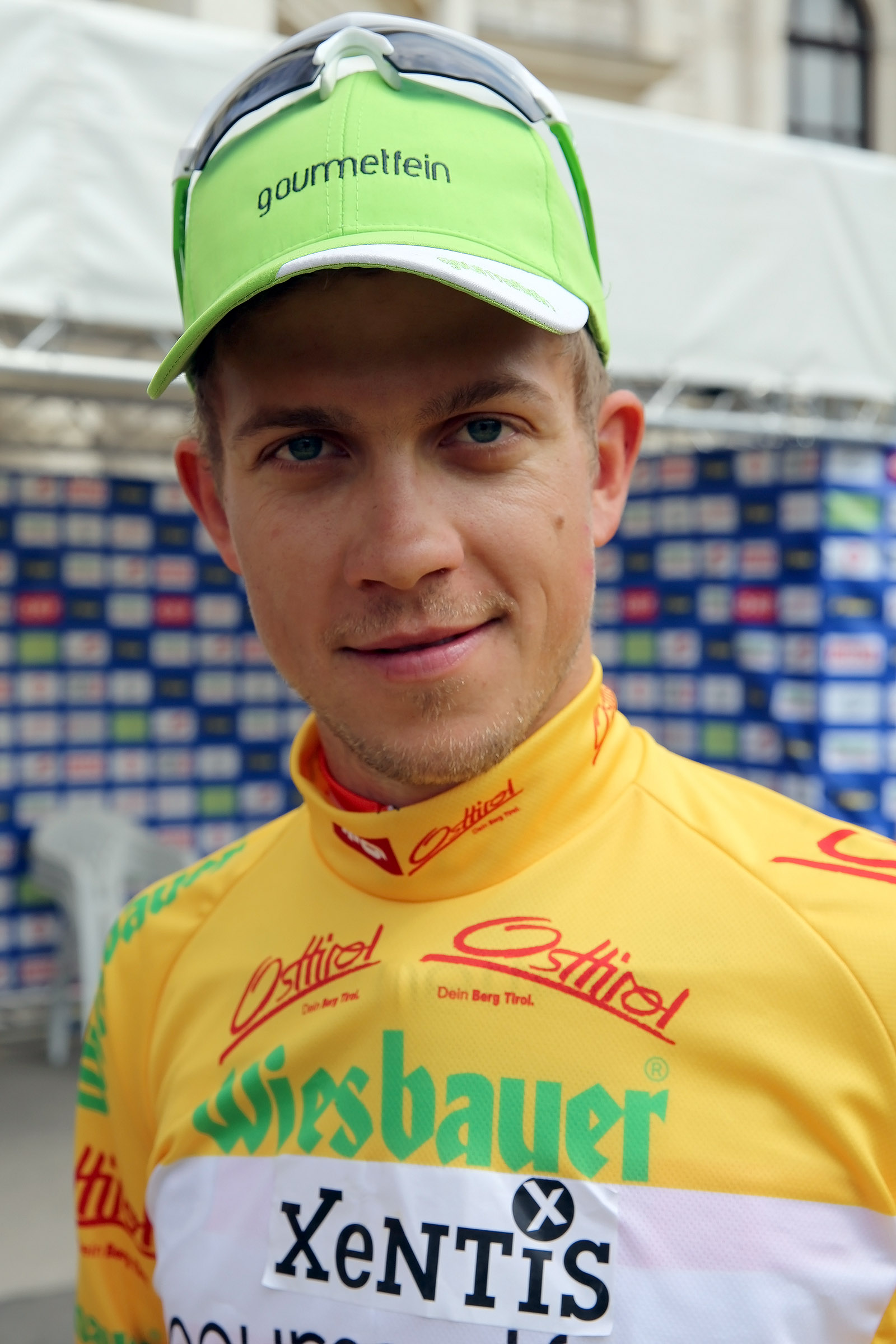
- Zoidl at the 2013 Tour of Austria

Personal information
- Full name: Riccardo Zoidl
- Nickname: Ricci
- Born: 8 April 1988 (age 38) Linz, Austria
- Height: 1.77 m (5 ft 10 in)
- Weight: 61 kg (134 lb)

Cycling career
- Sport: Cycling
- Current team: Team Felt–Felbermayr
- Discipline: Road
- Role: Rider
- Rider type: All-rounder

Professional teams
- 2007–2013: RC Arbö–Resch & Frisch–Gourmetfein–Wels
- 2014–2016: Trek Factory Racing
- 2017–2018: Team Felbermayr–Simplon Wels
- 2019: CCC Team
- 2020–2021: Team Felbermayr–Simplon Wels
- 2022: Team Vorarlberg
- 2023–: Team Felbermayr–Simplon Wels

Major wins
- Stage races Tour of Austria (2013) Single-day races and Classics National Time Trial Championships (2012) National Road Race Championships (2013, 2014) Other UCI Europe Tour (2013)

Riccardo Zoidl (born 8 April 1988) is an Austrian cyclist, who rides for UCI Continental team Team Felt–Felbermayr.

== Career ==
In 2012 he won the Austrian National Time Trial Championships and in 2013 and 2014 he won the Austrian National Road Race Championships. His biggest victory to date has been the 2013 Tour of Austria.

Zoidl left Gourmetfein–Simplon at the end of the 2013 season, and joined Trek Factory Racing for the 2014 season. He was named in the start list for the 2015 Vuelta a España.

In December 2018 the CCC Team announced that they had recruited Zoidl for 2019 as a replacement for fellow Austrian Stefan Denifl, after the team and Denifl had agreed to cancel the latter's contract for personal reasons. He left the team following the 2019 season, rejoining Team Felbermayr–Simplon Wels for 2020 – his third spell with the team. He joined Team Vorarlberg for the 2022 season, but signed a contract to rejoin Team Felbermayr–Simplon Wels for a fourth time, for the 2023 season.

== Major results ==
2010
9th Overall Thüringen Rundfahrt der U23
9th Overall Tour de Berlin
2011
1st Tobago Cycling Classic
Sibiu Cycling Tour

1st Stages 1 & 5

2nd Road race, National Road Championships
5th Overall Oberösterreich Rundfahrt
2012
1st Time trial, National Road Championships
3rd Overall Oberösterreich Rundfahrt

1st Points classification
1st Stage 3

3rd Belgrade–Banja Luka II
5th Trofeo Zsšdi
6th Overall Okolo Slovenska
6th Overall Tour of Szeklerland

1st Stage 1 (TTT)

9th Grand Prix Südkärnten
10th Poreč Trophy
2013
1st Road race, National Road Championships
1st Overall UCI Europe Tour
1st Overall Oberösterreich Rundfahrt

1st Points classification
1st Stages 2 & 3

1st Overall Circuit des Ardennes

1st Stage 2

1st Overall Tour de Bretagne

1st Stage 2

1st Overall Tour of Austria
1st Raiffeisen Grand Prix
1st Croatia–Slovenia
2nd Poreč Trophy
4th Overall Giro della Regione Friuli Venezia Giulia
4th Overall Okolo Jižních Čech
5th Overall Settimana Internazionale di Coppi e Bartali
8th Overall Istrian Spring Trophy
8th Grand Prix Südkärnten
2014
1st Road race, National Road Championships
3rd Overall Tour Méditerranéen
5th Overall Tour of Austria
2015
2nd Time trial, National Road Championships
8th Overall Tour of California
2016
3rd Time trial, National Road Championships
10th Overall Tour of Croatia

1st Mountains classification
1st Stage 4

2017
2nd Overall Oberösterreich Rundfahrt
2nd Overall Flèche du Sud

1st Stage 3

National Road Championships

4th Road race
4th Time trial

5th Overall Circuit des Ardennes

1st Points classification
1st Stage 4

5th Pro Ötztaler 5500
9th Raiffeisen Grand Prix
2018
1st Overall Czech Cycling Tour

1st Points classification
1st Stage 2

1st Overall Tour de Savoie Mont-Blanc

1st Points classification

2nd Overall Oberösterreich Rundfahrt
2nd Raiffeisen Grand Prix
4th Road race, National Road Championships
5th Overall Tour of Austria
2019
7th Overall Tour of Austria
2020
Tour of Antalya

1st Mountains classification
1st Stage 3

2021
2nd Overall Oberösterreich Rundfahrt
5th Overall Sibiu Cycling Tour
5th Overall Czech Cycling Tour
10th GP Czech Republic, Visegrad 4 Bicycle Race
2022
5th Overall International Tour of Rhodes
5th Overall Oberösterreich Rundfahrt
8th Overall Czech Cycling Tour
2023
5th Overall Oberösterreich Rundfahrt
6th Overall International Tour of Rhodes
8th Memorial Henryka Łasaka
2024
1st Overall International Tour of Hellas

1st Stage 4

3rd GP Slovenian Istria
4th Road race, National Road Championships
8th GP Vorarlberg
10th Overall Tour of Austria
2025
8th Overall International Tour of Hellas
2026
8th Overall Okolo Slovenska

=== Grand Tour general classification results timeline ===
Grand Tour	2014	2015	2016
Giro d'Italia	40	—	39
Tour de France	—	—	—
Vuelta a España	—	54	58

Legend
—	Did not compete
DNF	Did not finish
