= Harald Starzengruber =

Austrian cyclist

Personal information
- Born: 11 April 1981 (age 45) Leogang, Austria

Cycling career
- Sport: Cycling
- Disciplines: Road, Cyclo Cross
- Role: Rider

Amateur teams
- 2003–2005: U.C. Trevigiani–Dynamon
- 2010: Union Raiffeisen Radteam Tyrol

Professional teams
- 2004: Quick-Step–Davitamon (stagiaire)
- 2006–2009: Elk Haus–Simplon
- 2011: Union Raiffeisen Radteam Tyrol

Harald Starzengruber (born 11 April 1981) is an Austrian cyclist, who last rode for Union Raiffeisen Radteam Tyrol. He won the Austrian National Road Race Championships in 2010.

== Palmares ==
=== Road ===
2000
U23 National Road Race Champion
3rd U23 National Time Trial Championships
2004
1st Memorial Carlo Valentini
2005
1st Coppa Colli Briantei Internazionale
2006
1st Bürgenland Rundfahrt
2007
3rd Völkermarkter Radsporttage
2008
3rd National Time Trial Championships
2009
1st Giro di Festina Schwanenstadt
2010
National Road Race Champion

=== Cyclo-Cross ===
2000-2001
National U23 Cyclo-Cross Champion
2002-2003
National U23 Cyclo-Cross Champion
