= Richard Schmied =

Austrian cyclist

Personal information
- Full name: Richard Schmied

Cycling career
- Sport: Cycling

Richard Schmied is an Austrian former cyclist. He won the Austrian National Road Race Championships in 1992.
