= Johanna Freysinger =

Austrian cyclist

Personal information
- Nickname: Johanna Freysinger
- Born: 1 March 1962 (age 64)

Cycling career
- Sport: Cycling

Johanna Freysinger (born 1 March 1962) is an Austrian former cyclist. She won the Austrian National Road Race Championships in 1997.
