= Herbert Füzi =

Austrian cyclist

Personal information
- Full name: Herbert Füzi

Cycling career
- Sport: Cycling

Herbert Füzi is an Austrian former cyclist. He won the Austrian National Road Race Championships in 1972.
