= Ulrike Baumgartner =

Austrian cyclist

Personal information
- Born: 12 May 1974 (age 52)

Cycling career
- Sport: Cycling

Ulrike Baumgartner (born 12 May 1974) is an Austrian former cyclist. She won the Austrian National Road Race Championships in 1999.
