= Daniel Schorn =

Austrian road racing cyclist

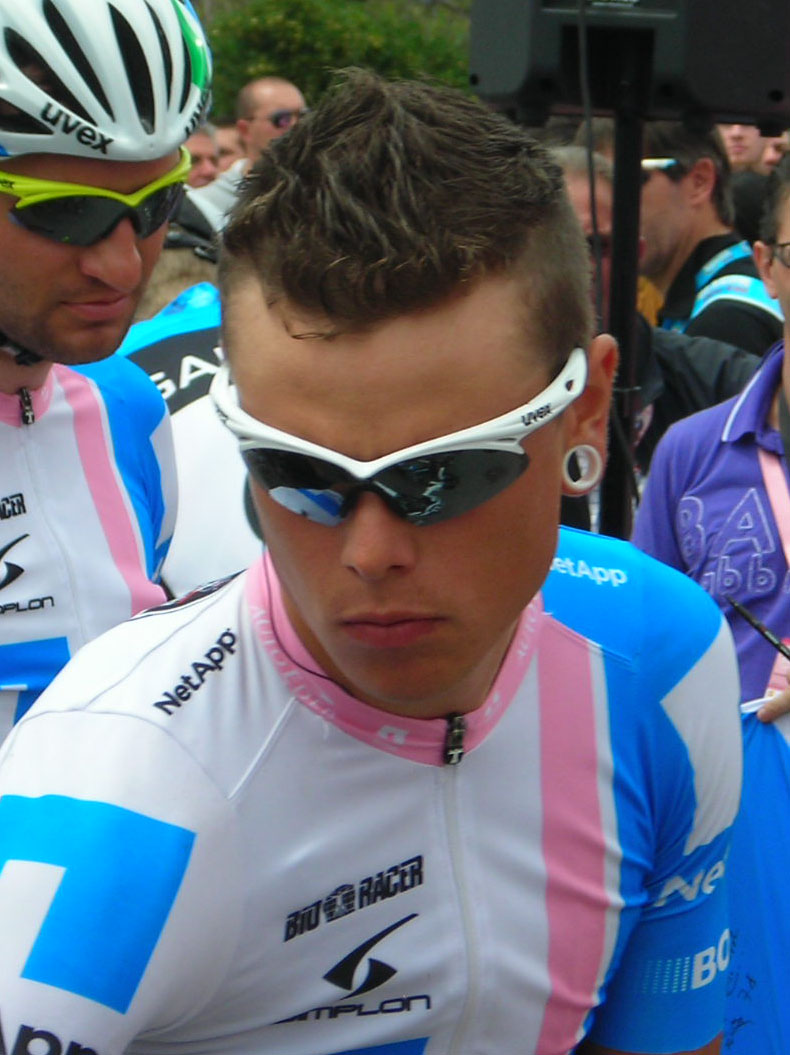
- Schorn at the 2012 Giro d'Italia.

Personal information
- Full name: Daniel Schorn
- Born: 21 October 1988 (age 37) Zell am See, Austria
- Height: 1.83 m (6 ft 0 in)
- Weight: 72 kg (159 lb)

Cycling career
- Sport: Cycling
- Current team: Retired
- Discipline: Road
- Role: Rider
- Rider type: Sprinter

Amateur team
- 2007: ARC-KTM-Junkers-Team

Professional teams
- 2008–2009: Elk Haus–Simplon
- 2010–2015: Team NetApp
- 2016: Team Felbermayr–Simplon Wels

Daniel Schorn (born 21 October 1988) is an Austrian former professional road bicycle racer, who rode professionally between 2008 and 2016 for the Elk Haus, Bora–Argon 18, and Team Felbermayr–Simplon Wels teams.

Born in Zell am See, Schorn, and Team NetApp, made their Grand Tour début at the 2012 Giro d'Italia, where Schorn took fifth place during the ninth stage of the race. The result came after Schorn avoided a crash with around 400 m (1,300 ft) to go, that eliminated several other sprinters from contention.

== Major results ==
2004
1st Road race, National Novice Road Championships
2005
1st Stage 3 Niedersachsen Rundfahrt (junior)
2007
3rd GP Austria Alu Guss
8th Overall Mainfranken-Tour
2008
1st Stage 1 ARBÖ-Raiba ÖBV Radsporttage
3rd Time trial, National Under-23 Road Championships
5th Road race, UEC European Under-23 Road Championships
2009
1st Stage 2b Linz–Passau–Budweis
2nd Eschborn–Frankfurt City Loop U23
2nd Lavanttaler Radsporttage
3rd Overall Tchibo Cup

3rd Schwaz

4th Internationales Eröffnungsrennen
6th GP Judendorf-Strassengel
2010
1st Stage 3 Tour de Normandie
6th Neuseen Classics
10th Overall Okolo Slovenska

1st Stages 2 & 6

2011
3rd Tour de Rijke
7th Trofeo Cala Millor
10th Memorial Rik Van Steenbergen
2012
1st Stage 2b (TTT) Settimana Internazionale di Coppi e Bartali
3rd Volta Limburg Classic
8th Eschborn–Frankfurt City Loop
9th Clásica de Almería
2014
2nd Omloop van het Houtland
5th Druivenkoers Overijse
2015
3rd Road race, National Road Championships
8th Druivenkoers Overijse
2016
1st Stage 1 Rhône-Alpes Isère Tour
4th Overall Tour d'Azerbaïdjan

1st Points classification

6th GP Adria Mobil
