= Arno Wohlfahrter =

Austrian cyclist

Personal information
- Born: 27 November 1964 (age 61) Klagenfurt, Austria

Cycling career
- Sport: Cycling

Arno Wohlfahrter (German pronunciation: [ˈaʁno ˈvoːlfaːɐ̯tɐ]; 27 November 1964) is an Austrian former cyclist. He won the Austrian National Road Race Championships in 1987.
