= Jürgen Pauritsch =

Austrian cyclist

Personal information
- Born: 2 May 1977 (age 49) Graz, Austria

Cycling career
- Sport: Cycling

Jürgen Pauritsch (born 2 May 1977) is an Austrian former cyclist. He won the Austrian National Road Race Championships in 2001.
