= Sigi Denk =

Austrian cyclist (1951–1982)

Personal information
- Full name: Siegfried Denk
- Nickname: Sigi
- Born: 10 February 1951 Braunau am Inn, Austria
- Died: 5 March 1982 (aged 31) Vienna, Austria
- Height: 184 cm (6 ft 0 in)
- Weight: 72 kg (159 lb)

Cycling career
- Sport: Cycling

Siegfried "Sigi" Denk (10 February 1951 – 5 March 1982) was an Austrian cyclist. He competed in the team time trial at the 1972 Summer Olympics and won the Austrian National Road Race Championships in 1971 and 1974. In 1982, he died from suicide by hanging.
