= Andrea Purner-Koschier =

Austrian cyclist

Personal information
- Born: 2 August 1972 (age 54) Aldrans, Austria

Cycling career
- Sport: Cycling

Andrea Purner-Koschier (2 August 1972) is an Austrian former cyclist. She won the Austrian National Road Race Championships in 1992, 2000 and 2001.
