= Hans-Peter Obwaller =

Austrian cyclist

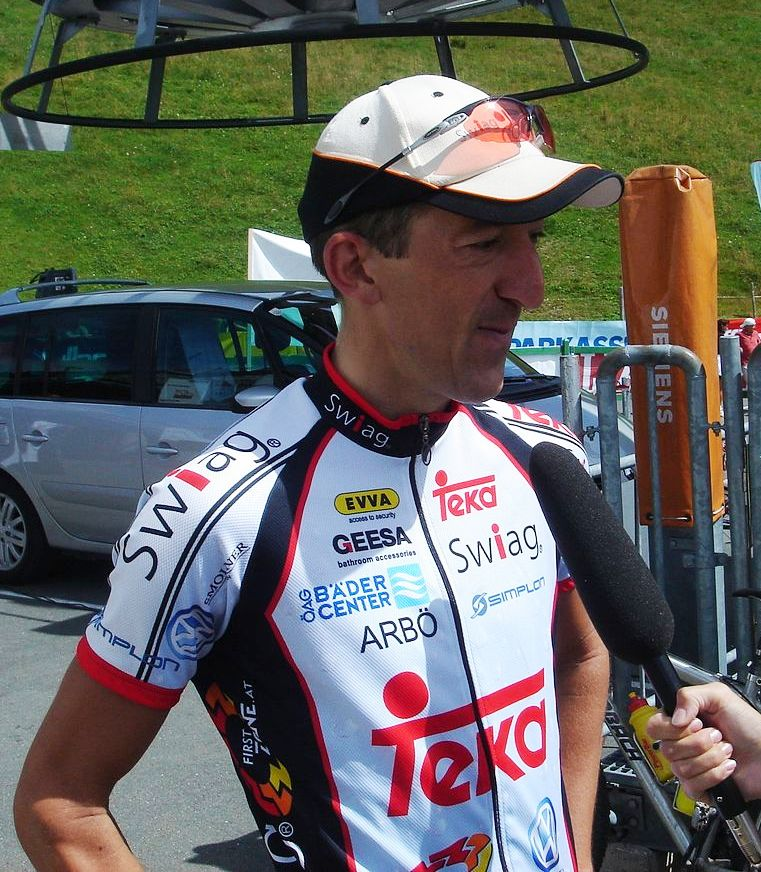

Personal information
- Born: 17 June 1971 (age 55) Saalfelden, Austria

Cycling career
- Sport: Cycling
- Current team: Retired
- Discipline: Road
- Role: Rider

Professional teams
- 2001: Stabil Steiermark
- 2002: Mobilvetta Design
- 2003: Arboe Merida
- 2004: Volksbank–Ideal Leingrüber
- 2005: Sava
- 2006: Swiag Teka
- 2007–2008: RC Arbö–Resch & Frisch–Gourmetfein–Wels
- 2009–2010: Team Moserwirt Ridley

Hans-Peter Obwaller (born 17 June 1971) is an Austrian former cyclist.

== Major results ==
2001
1st National Hill Climb Championships
1st Stage 5 Sachsen-Tour
2nd Overall Tour of Austria
3rd National Road Race Championships
2002
1st National Hill Climb Championships
2nd Overall Tour of Austria

1st Stage 5

2003
1st National Hill Climb Championships
3rd Overall Tour of Austria
2004
1st National Hill Climb Championships
3rd National Time Trial Championships
2005
1st National Time Trial Championships
3rd National Road Race Championships
2007
2nd National Time Trial Championships
2008
2nd National Road Race Championships
