= Katarína Uhláriková =

Slovak cyclist

Katarína Uhlariková
Personal information
- Born: 9 February 1988 (age 38) Slovakia

Cycling career
- Sport: Cycling
- Discipline: Road cycling

Professional team
- 2008: Elk Haus-Nö

Katarína Uhlariková (born 9 February 1988) is a road cyclist from Slovakia. She represented her nation at the 2008 UCI Road World Championships.
