= Michael Gogl =

Austrian racing cyclist

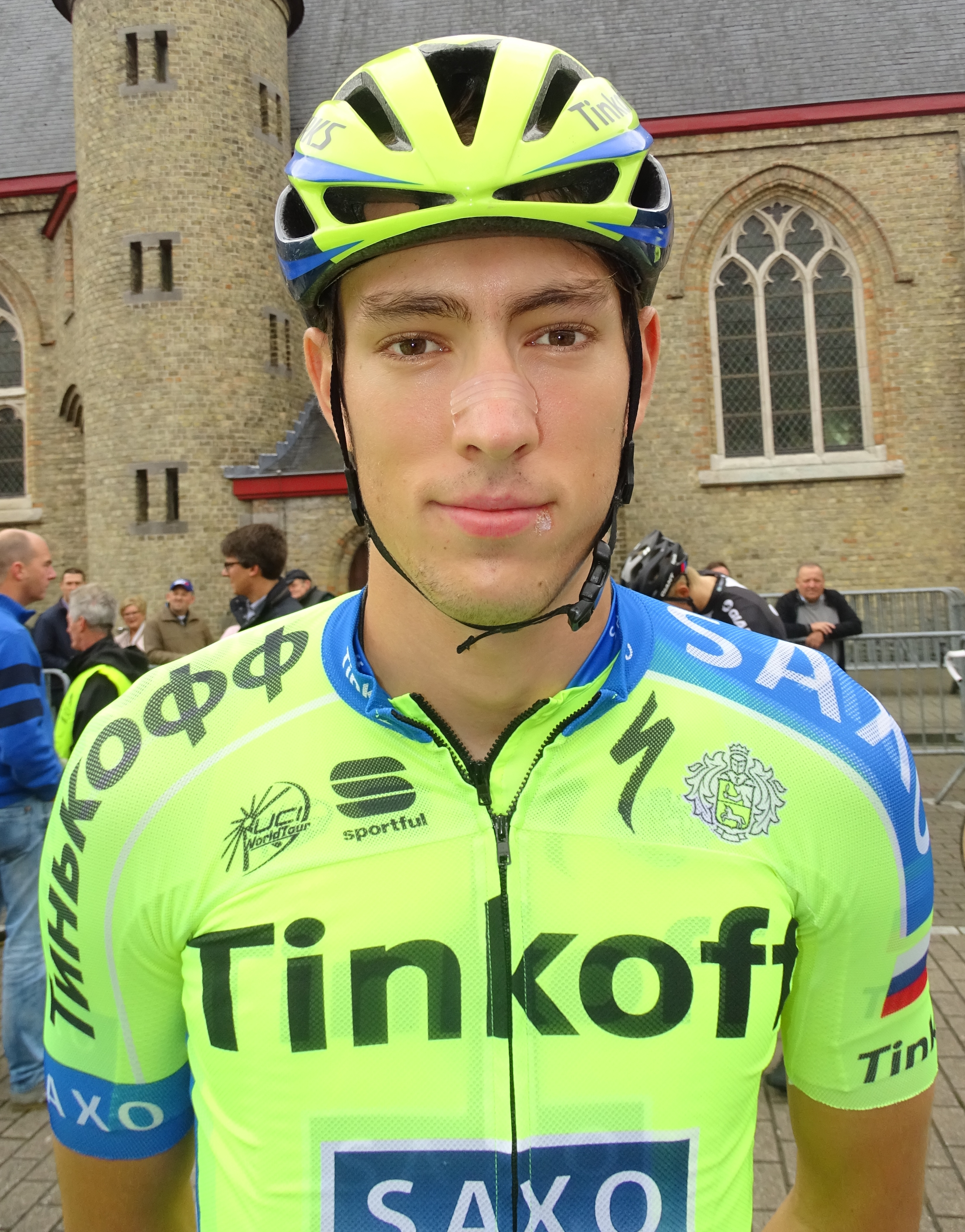
- Gogl in 2015

Personal information
- Full name: Michael Gogl
- Born: 4 November 1993 (age 32) Gmunden, Austria
- Height: 1.86 m (6 ft 1 in)
- Weight: 70 kg (154 lb; 11 st 0 lb)

Cycling career
- Sport: Cycling
- Current team: Alpecin–Premier Tech
- Discipline: Road
- Role: Rider

Professional teams
- 2012–2014: Arbö–Gebrüder Weiss–Oberndorfer
- 2015: Team Felbermayr–Simplon Wels
- 2015: Tirol Cycling Team
- 2015: Tinkoff–Saxo (stagiaire)
- 2016: Tinkoff
- 2017–2019: Trek–Segafredo
- 2020–2021: NTT Pro Cycling
- 2022–: Alpecin–Fenix

Michael Gogl (born 4 November 1993) is an Austrian cyclist, who currently rides for UCI WorldTeam Alpecin–Premier Tech. He was named in the startlist for the 2016 Vuelta a España. In June 2017, he was named in the startlist for the Tour de France. In May 2019, he was named in the startlist for the 2019 Giro d'Italia.

== Major results ==
2014
1st Stage 4 Grand Prix of Sochi
2015
1st Road race, National Under-23 Road Championships
1st GP Laguna
7th Overall Istrian Spring Trophy
2016
3rd Road race, National Road Championships
4th Overall Danmark Rundt
2017
3rd Road race, National Road Championships
8th Amstel Gold Race
2018
5th Overall Tour Poitou-Charentes en Nouvelle-Aquitaine

1st Young rider classification

5th Overall Tour des Fjords
7th Trofeo Serra de Tramuntana
2019
2nd Road race, National Road Championships
10th Ronde van Drenthe
2020
3rd Road race, National Road Championships
9th Strade Bianche
2021
5th Road race, National Road Championships
6th Overall Étoile de Bessèges
6th Strade Bianche
2024
6th Overall Danmark Rundt

=== Grand Tour general classification results timeline ===
Grand Tour	2016	2017	2018	2019	2020	2021	2022	2023
Giro d'Italia	—	—	—	97	—	—	—	—
Tour de France	—	146	113	—	DNF	DNF	DNF	133
Vuelta a España	68	—	—	—	—	—	—	

Legend
—	Did not compete
DNF	Did not finish
