= Mario Traxl =

Austrian cyclist

Personal information
- Born: 30 May 1964 (age 62) Münchendorf, Austria

Cycling career
- Sport: Cycling

Mario Traxl (born 30 May 1964) is an Austrian former cyclist. He won the Austrian National Road Race Championships in 1989 and 1994. He also rode in two events at the 1988 Summer Olympics.
