= V4 Ladies Series =

Series of professional bicycle races

Race details
- Date: May
- Region: Hungary
- Local name(s): V4 Ladies Series - Pannonhalma; V4 Ladies Series - Restart Zalaegerszeg
- Discipline: Road
- Competition: UCI 1.2 (2019–)
- Type: Stage race

History
- First edition: 2019
- Editions: 1 (as of 2019–)

The V4 Ladies Series is series of an annual professional road bicycle races for women in Hungary.

== Winners – V4 Ladies Series - Pannonhalma ==
Year	Country	Rider	Team
2019	Russia	Polina Kirillova	Russia (National team)

== Winners – V4 Ladies Series - Restart Zalaegerszeg ==
Year	Country	Rider	Team
2019	Ukraine	Olga Shekel	Astana Women's Team
