= Hannes Hempel =

Austrian cyclist

Personal information
- Born: 6 October 1973 (age 53) Klagenfurt, Austria

Cycling career
- Sport: Cycling

Hannes Hempel (6 October 1973) is an Austrian former cyclist. He won the Austrian National Road Race Championships in 1999.
