= Christian Pfannberger =

Austrian road racing cyclist

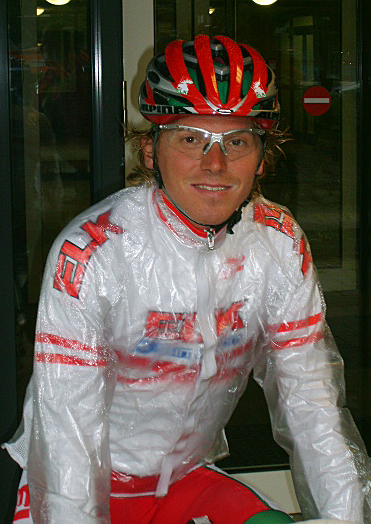
- Pfannberger in 2007

Personal information
- Full name: Christian Pfannberger
- Born: 9 December 1979 (age 46) Judenburg, Austria

Cycling career
- Sport: Cycling
- Current team: None
- Discipline: Road
- Role: Rider
- Rider type: Classics specialist

Professional teams
- 2002: Nurnberger Versicherung
- 2003: Volksbank–Ideal
- 2004: eD'System-ZVVZ
- 2006–2007: Elk Haus–Simplon
- 2008: Barloworld
- 2009: Team Katusha

Major wins
- National Road Race Champion (2007, 2008)

Christian Pfannberger (born 9 December 1979) is an Austrian former professional road racing cyclist. He was a two-time Austrian national road-race champion (2007 and 2008). Other achievements included winning the U23 National Championship in 2001 and the Giro del Capo, a stage race in South Africa in 2008. In spring 2008 he had top 10 finishes in all three of the Ardennes classics. Pfannberger was handed a lifetime ban by the Austrian National Anti-Doping Agency for his second doping violation.

== Doping ==
Pfannberger served a two-year suspension between 2004 and 2006 for a positive testosterone test. In May 2009, he was suspended by Team Katusha pending clarification of a non-negative doping test at an out-of-competition control in March of that year. He had been on Katusha's preliminary start list for the 2009 Giro d'Italia, but he was suspended and replaced by Alexander Serov when news of the positive test broke.

On 29 June, it was announced that his B sample had also tested positive, and that he would face a hearing in the next eight weeks which could result in Pfannberger being suspended for a period ranging from eight years to a lifetime ban.

Pfannberger was subsequently handed a lifetime ban by the Austrian National Anti-Doping Agency for his second doping violation. He has consistently maintained that he has never doped, and will challenge the lifetime ban.

== Major achievements ==
2001
(U23) National Road Race Champion
(U23) Thüringen-Rundfahrt & 1 stage

2006
3rd Overall, Tour of Austria

1st, Stage 3

2007
National Road Race Champion

2008 – Barloworld
1st, Overall, Giro del Capo

1st, Stage 1

6th, Amstel Gold Race
9th, La Flèche Wallonne
5th, Liège–Bastogne–Liège
National Road Race Champion
8th, 2008 UCI Road World Championships

2009
~~4th, GP Miguel Indurain~~
~~9th, Amstel Gold Race~~
