= Georg Totschnig =

Austrian cyclist

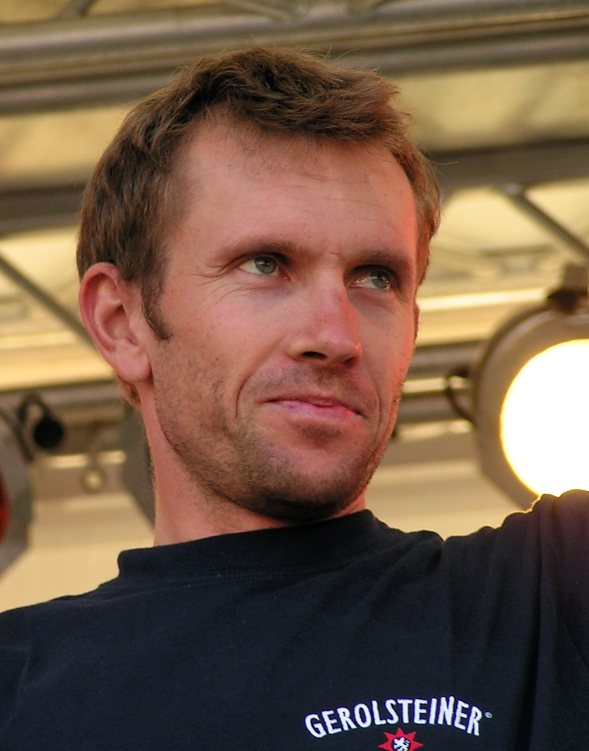

Personal information
- Full name: Georg Totschnig
- Born: 25 May 1971 (age 55) Kaltenbach, Austria
- Height: 1.75 m (5 ft 9 in)
- Weight: 62 kg (137 lb; 9 st 11 lb)

Cycling career
- Sport: Cycling
- Current team: Retired
- Discipline: Road
- Role: Rider
- Rider type: Climbing specialist

Professional teams
- 1993: Lampre – Polti
- 1994: Polti
- 1995: Polti – Granarolo – Santini
- 1996: Polti
- 1997–2000: Deutsche Telekom
- 2001–2006: Gerolsteiner

Major wins
- Tour de France, 1 stage Tour of Austria (2000); National Champion (1997, 2003); National Time-Trial Champion (1996, 1997, 2001, 2002, 2004)

Georg Totschnig (born 25 May 1971) is an Austrian former road bicycle racer who raced professionally between 1993 and 2006. He won the Austrian National Road Race Championships in 1997 and 2003. He also rode at three Olympic Games.

== Career ==
In 1989, Totschnig became the Junior Austrian National Time Trial Champion. He turned professional with the Italian Lampre – Polti team in 1993, remaining with the team in 1994 when Polti became the main sponsor for the first time. He finished 5th in the 1994 edition of the Tour DuPont and a few weeks later entered his first Grand Tour, which was the 1994 Giro where he finished 13th overall helped by a top 10 on the final ITT. The following year he rode the Giro again where he finished in the top 10 on five stages ending up in 9th overall. He finished 37th in his first Tour entry and was 4th in the Young Rider Classification. The following year he abandoned the Giro prior to the final ITT and missed the Tour but had a very strong performance in the 1996 Vuelta a España coming in 6th overall. In 1997, he rode the Tour for a second time, in support of Bjarne Riis and eventual Tour winner Jan Ullrich. Totschnig finished 34th overall, good enough for fourth place on the very strong Team Telekom which also included Green jersey winner Erik Zabel.

He rode well in the scandalous 1998 Tour de France, once again in 4th place on a very strong team as Ullrich fell just short of repeating with Marco Pantani finding a way to drop him in the mountains. In 1999 he cracked the top 20 in the Tour for the first time but the following year he didn't ride in any Grand Tours.

He joined his final team, Gerolsteiner, in 2001 and while he missed all the Grand Tours that year, he had top 10's in both the Deutschland Tour as well as the Tour of Switzerland. The following year, he rode in the Giro once again and finished 7th overall. He followed this up with the Tour of Switzerland where he finished 5th. During the 2003 Giro d'Italia he finished 5th overall and then rode a very strong Tour coming in 12th overall. In 2004 he finished 4th at the Tour of Switzerland and then entered the Tour as the team leader, even though Gerolsteiner was nowhere near as strong as the T-Mobile, CSC, Rabobank, the Spanish teams or the US Postal team of Lance Armstrong. Despite this Totschnig finished in 7th place, ahead of very strong riders including Richard Virenque, Vladimir Karpets, Óscar Pereiro, Carlos Sastre and Michael Rasmussen.

In stage 14 of the 2005 Tour de France, he got into a breakaway which ultimately led to the only Grand Tour stage victory of his career. Having split open the breakaway group he then dropped breakaway companions Stefano Garzelli and Walter Bénéteau and was the only rider able to hold off the rapidly closing GC Contenders on the penultimate climb to Ax 3 Domaines. Armstrong, Ullrich, Ivan Basso and Floyd Landis were all in pursuit and also had Totschnig's teammate Levi Leipheimer with them. Armstrong and Basso finished 2nd and 3rd behind him as he was able to claim the win by 56 seconds. He was the first Austrian to win a stage in the Tour de France since Max Bulla in 1931.

He was voted Austrian Sportsman of the year in 2005. Totschnig was surprised to win the accolade, as he had not expected to win more votes than the skier Benjamin Raich.

Totschnig's younger brother, Harald Totschnig is also a professional cyclist.

== Major results ==
1989

(Austria) Austrian National Time Trial Champion – Junior

1993

First year as a professional.

1994
–
1995
9th overall – Giro d'Italia
1996
(Austria) Austrian National Time Trial Champion
6th overall – Vuelta a España
1997
(Austria) Austrian National Road Race Champion
(Austria) Austrian National Time Trial Champion
1998
2nd overall – Volta a Catalunya
1999
2nd overall – Tour of Austria
2000
Overall and stage win – Tour of Austria
2001
(Austria) Austrian National Time Trial Champion
6th overall – Tour de Suisse
2002
(Austria) Austrian National Time Trial Champion
5th overall – Tour de Suisse
7th overall – Giro d'Italia
2003
(Austria) Austrian National Road Race Champion
5th overall – Giro d'Italia
12th overall – Tour de France
2004
(Austria) Austrian National Time Trial Champion
Stage win – Tour de Suisse
7th overall – Tour de France
Member, Austrian National Team, Athens Summer Olympics
2005
Stage 14 win – Tour de France
3rd overall – Deutschland Tour
2006

Retired at end of the 2006 UCI ProTour season.
