= Johann Lienhart =

Austrian cyclist

Personal information
- Born: 17 July 1960 (age 66) Fehring, Austria

Cycling career
- Sport: Cycling

Johann Lienhart (born 17 July 1960) is an Austrian former cyclist. He competed at the 1980, 1984 and 1988 Summer Olympics. He won the Austrian National Road Race Championships in 1983.
