= Daniel Biedermann =

Austrian racing cyclist

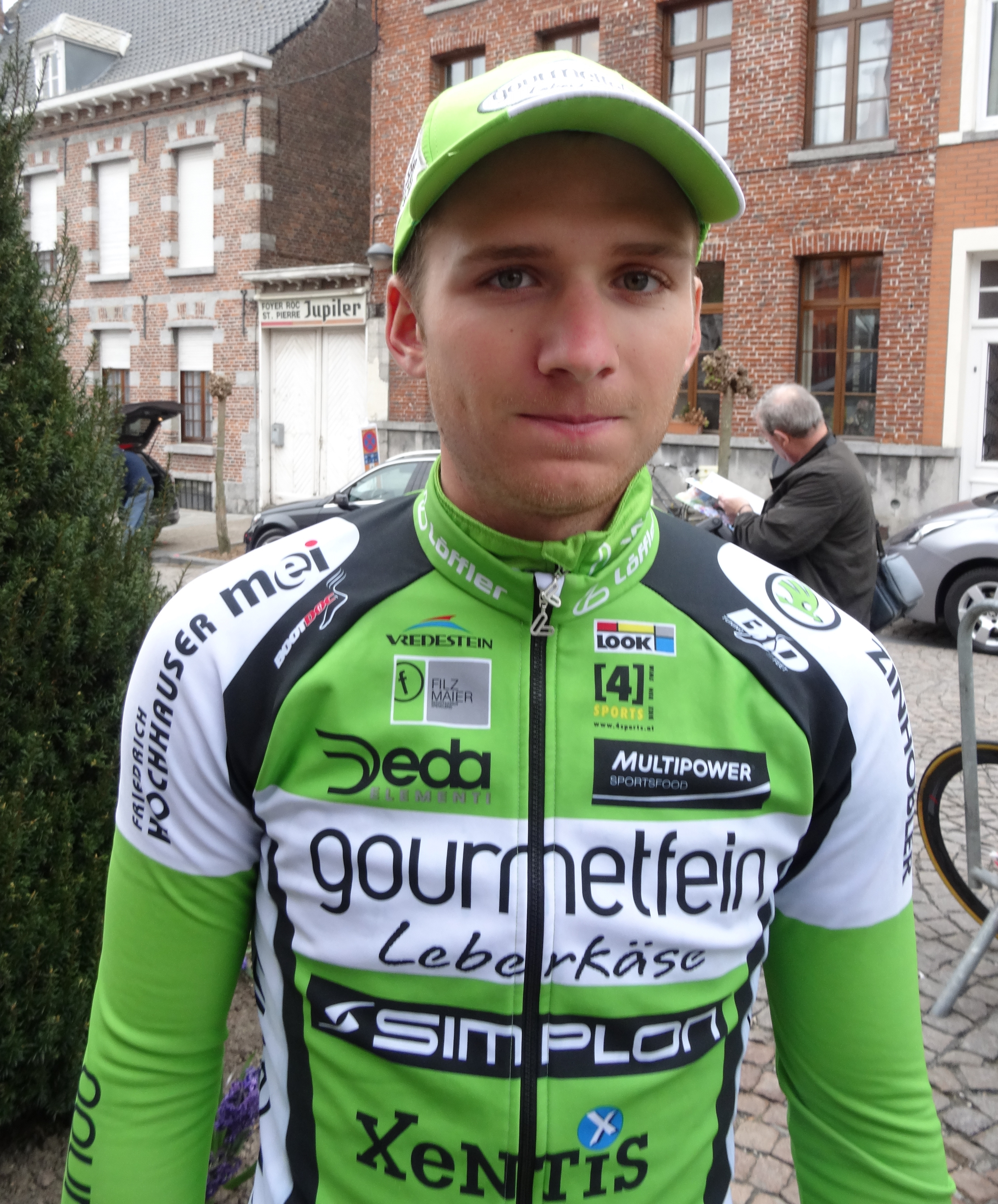
- Biedermann in 2014

Personal information
- Full name: Daniel Biedermann
- Born: 24 March 1993 (age 33) Klagenfurt, Austria
- Height: 178 cm (5 ft 10 in)
- Weight: 67 kg (148 lb)

Cycling career
- Sport: Cycling
- Current team: Retired
- Discipline: Road
- Role: Rider
- Rider type: Sprinter

Professional teams
- 2012: Tirol Cycling Team
- 2013: Team Vorarlberg
- 2014–2016: Gourmetfein–Simplon Wels

Daniel Biedermann (born 24 March 1993 in Klagenfurt) is an Austrian former professional racing cyclist.

== Major results ==
2011
1st Stage 4 Trofeo Karlsberg
3rd Road race, National Junior Road Championships
2014
2nd Poreč Trophy
7th Trofej Umag
2015
5th GP Laguna
7th GP Izola
9th GP Adria Mobil
