= Leo Karner =

Austrian cyclist

Personal information
- Born: 4 November 1952 (age 73) Annaberg, Lower Austria, Austria

Cycling career
- Sport: Cycling

Leo Karner (born 4 November 1952) is an Austrian former cyclist. He competed in the team time trial event at the 1976 Summer Olympics.
