= Andreas Matzbacher =

Austrian cyclist

Personal information
- Full name: Andreas Matzbacher
- Nickname: Matzi
- Born: 7 January 1982 Graz, Austria
- Died: 24 December 2007 (aged 25) Frohnleiten, Austria

Cycling career
- Sport: Cycling
- Discipline: Road
- Role: Rider

Professional teams
- 2004: Saeco
- 2005: Lampre
- 2006–2007: Team Volksbank

Andreas Matzbacher (7 January 1982 – 24 December 2007) was an Austrian professional road bicycle racer. On 24 December 2007 Matzbacher was killed in a car crash in southern Austria after he lost control of his car and crashed into an overhead signpost.
