= Herbert Spindler =

Austrian cyclist (born 1954)

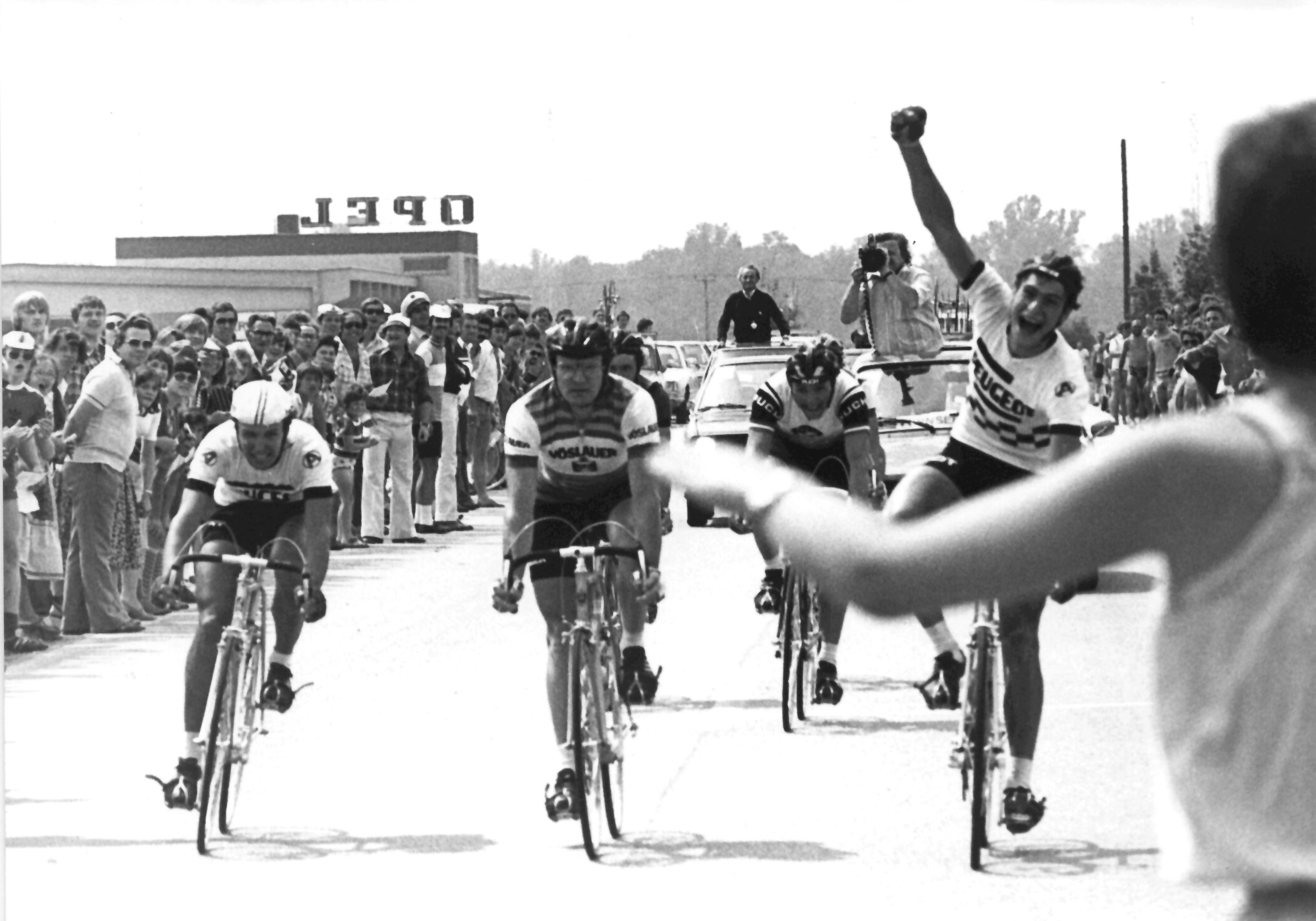
- Black-and-white photo of Spindler in a race

Personal information
- Born: 6 April 1954 (age 72) Salzburg, Austria

Cycling career
- Sport: Cycling

Herbert Spindler (born 6 April 1954) is an Austrian former cyclist. He competed at the 1976 Summer Olympics and the 1980 Summer Olympics. He won the Austrian National Road Race Championships in 1976 and 1978.
