= Ludwig Kretz =

Austrian cyclist

Personal information
- Full name: Ludwig Kretz
- Born: 2 May 1943 (age 83)

Cycling career
- Sport: Cycling

Ludwig Kretz (born 2 May 1943 in Upper Austria)is an Austrian former cyclist. He won the Austrian National Road Race Championships in 1975.
