= Andrea Graus =

Austrian cyclist

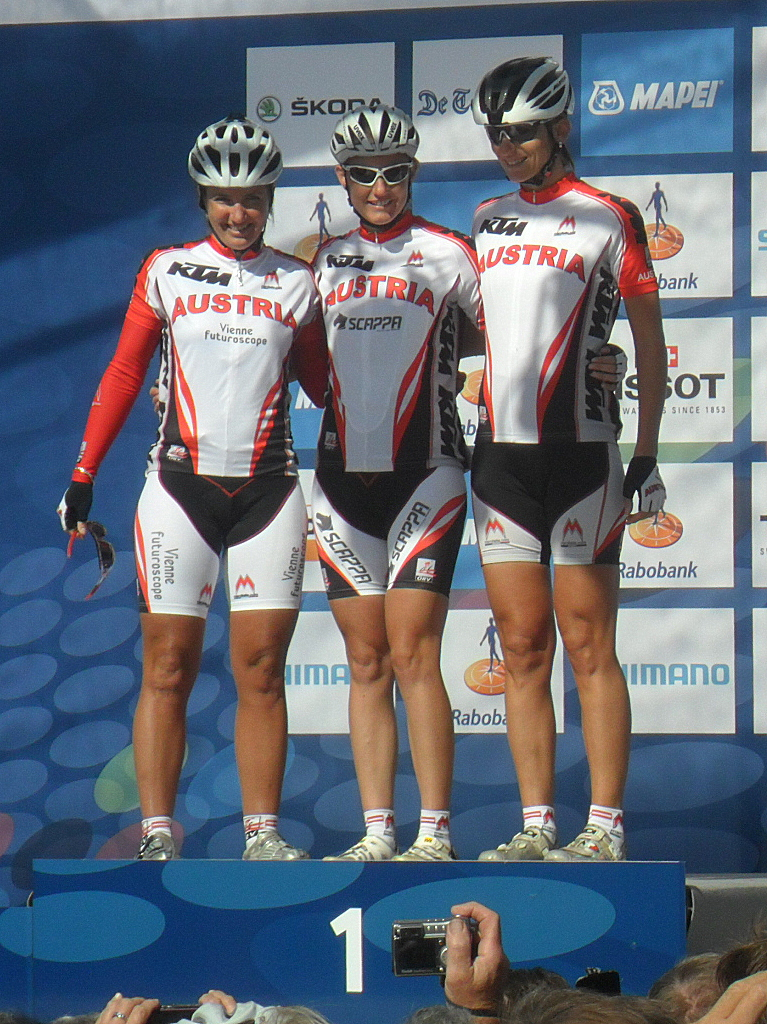
- Andrea Graus at the 2012 UCI Road World Championships

Personal information
- Born: 13 November 1979 (age 46) Innsbruck, Austria

Cycling career
- Sport: Cycling
- Role: Rider

Andrea Graus (born 13 November 1979) is an Austrian racing cyclist. She has won the Austrian National Road Race Championships five times. She competed in the 2012 UCI women's road race in Valkenburg aan de Geul and in the 2013 UCI women's road race in Florence.
