= Harald Totschnig =

Austrian bicycle racer

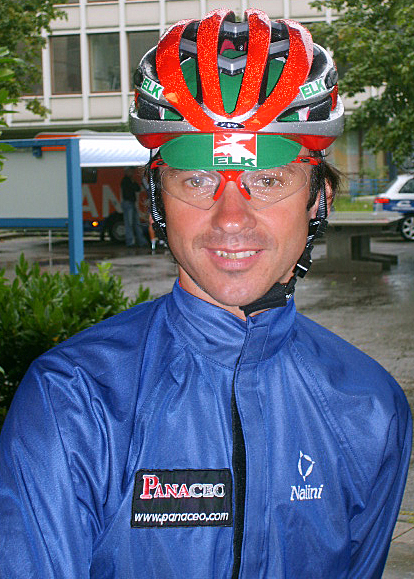
- Totschnig in 2007

Personal information
- Full name: Harald Totschnig
- Born: 6 September 1974 (age 52) Kaltenbach, Austria

Cycling career
- Sport: Cycling
- Current team: Retired
- Discipline: Road
- Role: Rider

Professional teams
- 2004–2009: Elk Haus–Simplon
- 2010–2013: Tyrol–Team Radland Tirol

Harald Totschnig (born 6 September 1974) is an Austrian former cyclist. His brother Georg Totschnig was also a professional cyclist.

== Major results ==
2003
9th Overall Tour de Slovénie
2006
3rd Road race, National Road Championships
2009
5th Tour de Seoul
2010
2nd Road race, National Road Championships
5th Overall Flèche du Sud
8th Overall Istrian Spring Trophy
8th Poreč Trophy
9th Raiffeisen Grand Prix
10th Zagreb–Ljubljana
2011
2nd Overall Flèche du Sud
5th Trofeo Alcide Degasperi
7th Overall Giro della Friuli Venezia Giulia
2013
3rd Road race, National Road Championships
