= Jochen Summer =

Austrian bicycle racer

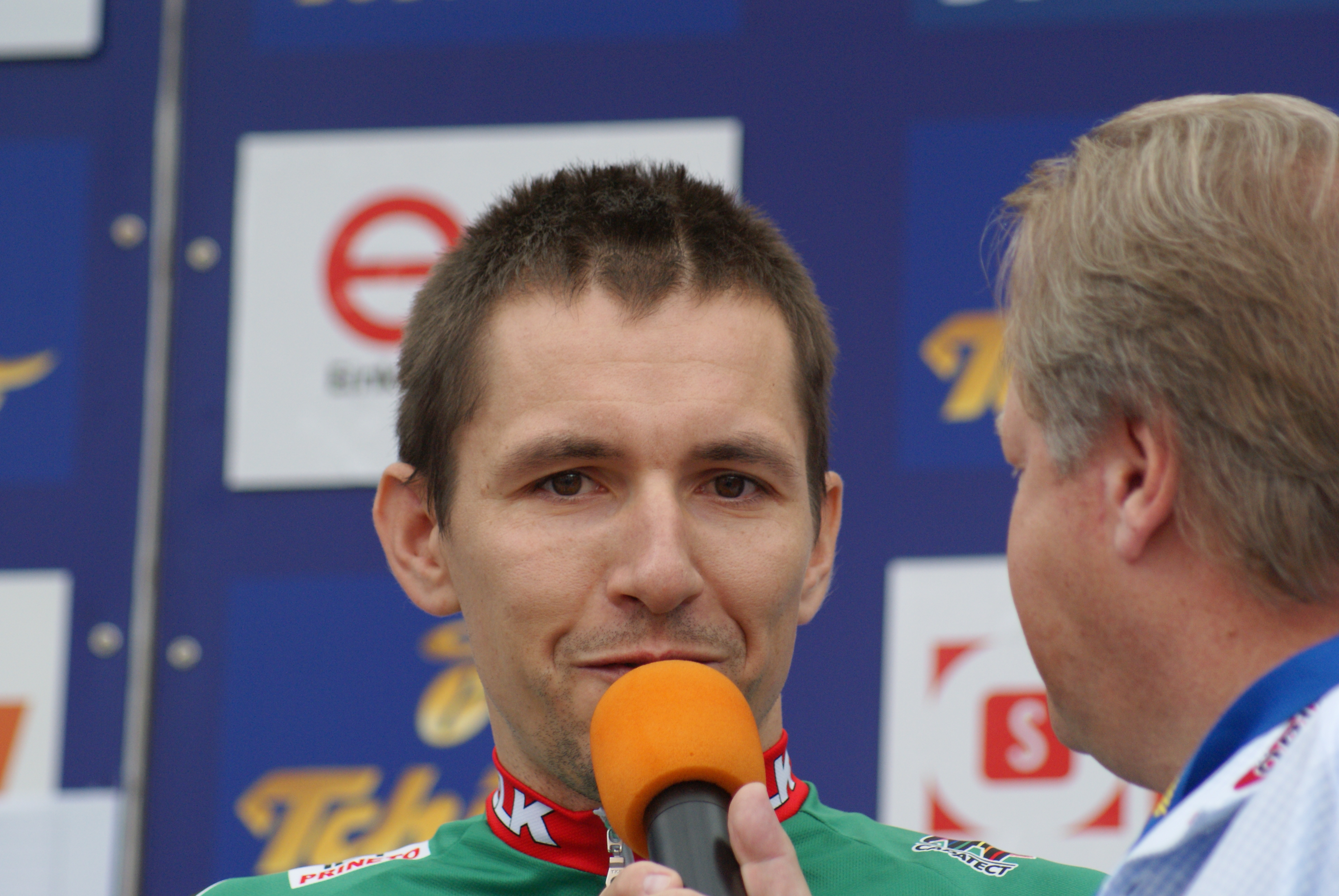

Personal information
- Full name: Jochen Summer
- Born: 28 May 1977 (age 49) Austria

Cycling career
- Sport: Cycling
- Current team: Retired
- Discipline: Road
- Role: Rider

Professional teams
- 2000: Phonak
- 2001–2003: Volksbank–Schwinn
- 2004–2009: Elk Haus–Simplon

Jochen Summer (born 28 May 1977) is an Austrian former racing cyclist.

== Major results ==
2002
1st Stage 5 Tour of Greece
2003
1st GP Voralberg
2005
1st Poreč Trophy
1st Stage 7 Tour of Austria
