= Armin Purner =

Austrian cyclist

Personal information
- Full name: Armin Purner

Cycling career
- Sport: Cycling

Armin Purner is an Austrian former cyclist. He won the Austrian National Road Race Championships in 1991.
