= Dietmar Hauer =

Austrian cyclist

Personal information
- Born: 12 March 1968 (age 58) Ybbs an der Donau, Austria

Cycling career
- Sport: Cycling

Dietmar Hauer (born 12 March 1968) is an Austrian former cyclist. He competed in two events at the 1988 Summer Olympics.
