= Stefan Rucker =

Austrian cyclist (born 1980)

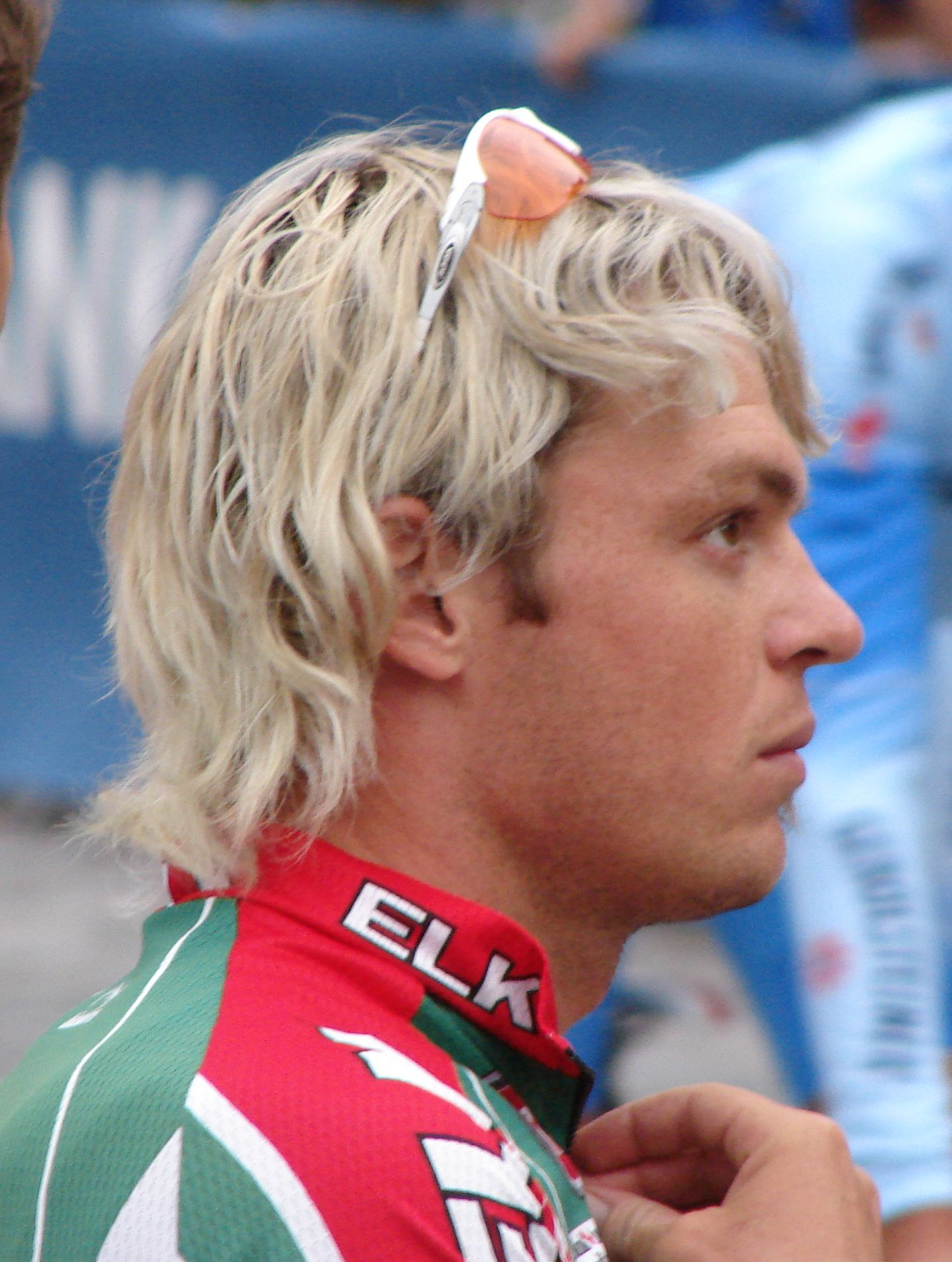
- Rucker in 2007

Personal information
- Full name: Stefan Rucker
- Born: 20 January 1980 (age 46) Knittelfeld, Austria

Cycling career
- Sport: Cycling
- Current team: Retired
- Discipline: Road
- Role: Rider

Professional teams
- 2002–2009: Elk Haus Radteam–Sportunion Schrems
- 2011: WSA Viperbike
- 2012–2013: RC Arbö–Wels–Gourmetfein

Stefan Rucker (born 20 January 1980) is an Austrian former professional racing cyclist.

== Major results ==
2001
2nd Road race, National Under-23 Road Championships
2004
3rd Raiffeisen Grand Prix
2005
2nd National Hill Climb Championships
2008
1st Stage 5 Tour Ivoirien de la Paix
3rd Road race, National Road Championships
2010
1st National Hill Climb Championships
2012
1st Stage 1 Tour of Szeklerland
