= Matthias Krizek =

Austrian cyclist

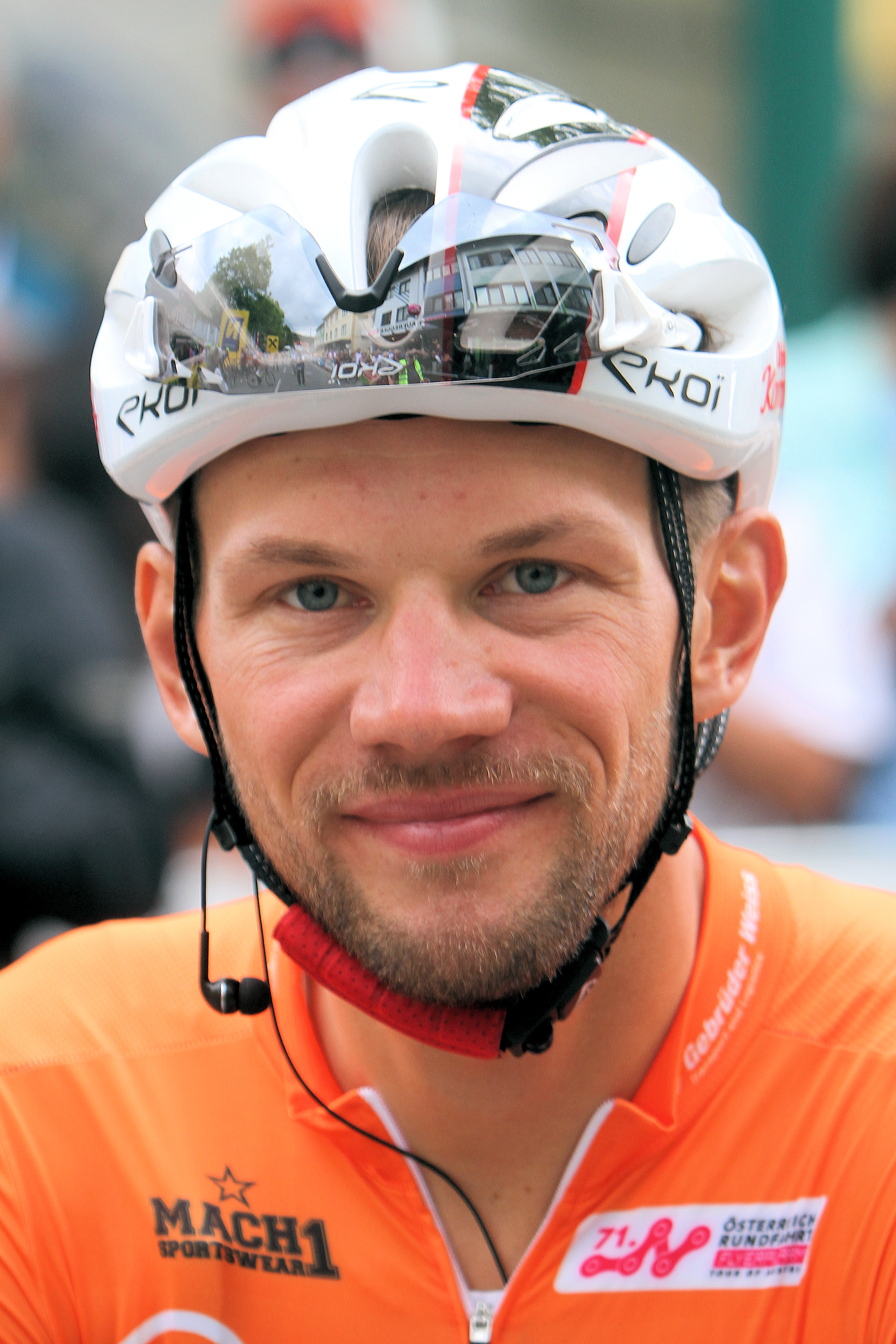
- Krizek in 2019

Personal information
- Full name: Matthias Krizek
- Born: 29 September 1988 (age 38) Vienna, Austria
- Height: 1.86 m (6 ft 1 in)
- Weight: 74 kg (163 lb)

Cycling career
- Sport: Cycling
- Current team: Retired
- Discipline: Road
- Role: Rider

Amateur teams
- 2011–2012: Marchiol
- 2012: Liquigas–Cannondale (stagiaire)

Professional teams
- 2008: Tyrol–Team Radland Tirol
- 2013–2014: Cannondale
- 2015: Team Felbermayr–Simplon Wels
- 2016: Team Roth
- 2017: Tirol Cycling Team
- 2018–2020: Team Felbermayr–Simplon Wels

Major wins
- One-day races and Classics National Road Race Championships (2011)

Matthias Krizek (born 29 September 1988 in Vienna) is an Austrian former professional cyclist, who rode professionally in 2008, and from 2013 to 2020 for Cannondale, Team Roth, the Tirol Cycling Team and Team Felbermayr–Simplon Wels. He won the Austrian National Road Race Championships in 2011.

== Major results ==
2006
2nd Road race, National Junior Road Championships
3rd Overall Trofeo Karlsberg
2008
4th Raiffeisen Grand Prix
2009
6th Overall Mainfranken-Tour
2011
1st Road race, National Road Championships
5th Giro del Medio Brenta
2012
1st Stage 1 Girobio
3rd Road race, National Road Championships
3rd Giro del Medio Brenta
6th GP Capodarco
2014
1st Most active rider classification, Tour de Pologne
Combativity award Stage 12 Vuelta a España
2015
2nd Road race, National Road Championships
2nd Overall Okolo Slovenska
2017
1st Stage 5 Flèche du Sud
2018
6th Overall Paris–Arras Tour

1st Mountains classification

8th Time trial, National Road Championships
2019
1st Overall Rhône-Alpes Isère Tour

1st Mountains classification

1st Sprints classification, Tour of the Alps
National Road Championships

5th Time trial
8th Road race

5th Overall Oberösterreich Rundfahrt
2020
10th Grand Prix Gazipaşa
