= Kurt Zellhofer =

Austrian cyclist

Personal information
- Born: 9 March 1958 (age 68) Vienna, Austria

Cycling career
- Sport: Cycling

Kurt Zellhofer (born 9 March 1958) is an Austrian former cyclist. He competed at the 1980 Summer Olympics and the 1984 Summer Olympics.
