= Heinz Marchel =

Austrian cyclist

Personal information
- Born: 9 June 1967 (age 59)

Cycling career
- Sport: Cycling

Heinz Marchel (9 June 1967) is an Austrian former cyclist. He won the Austrian National Road Race Championships in 1996.
