= Elk Haus =

Cycling team

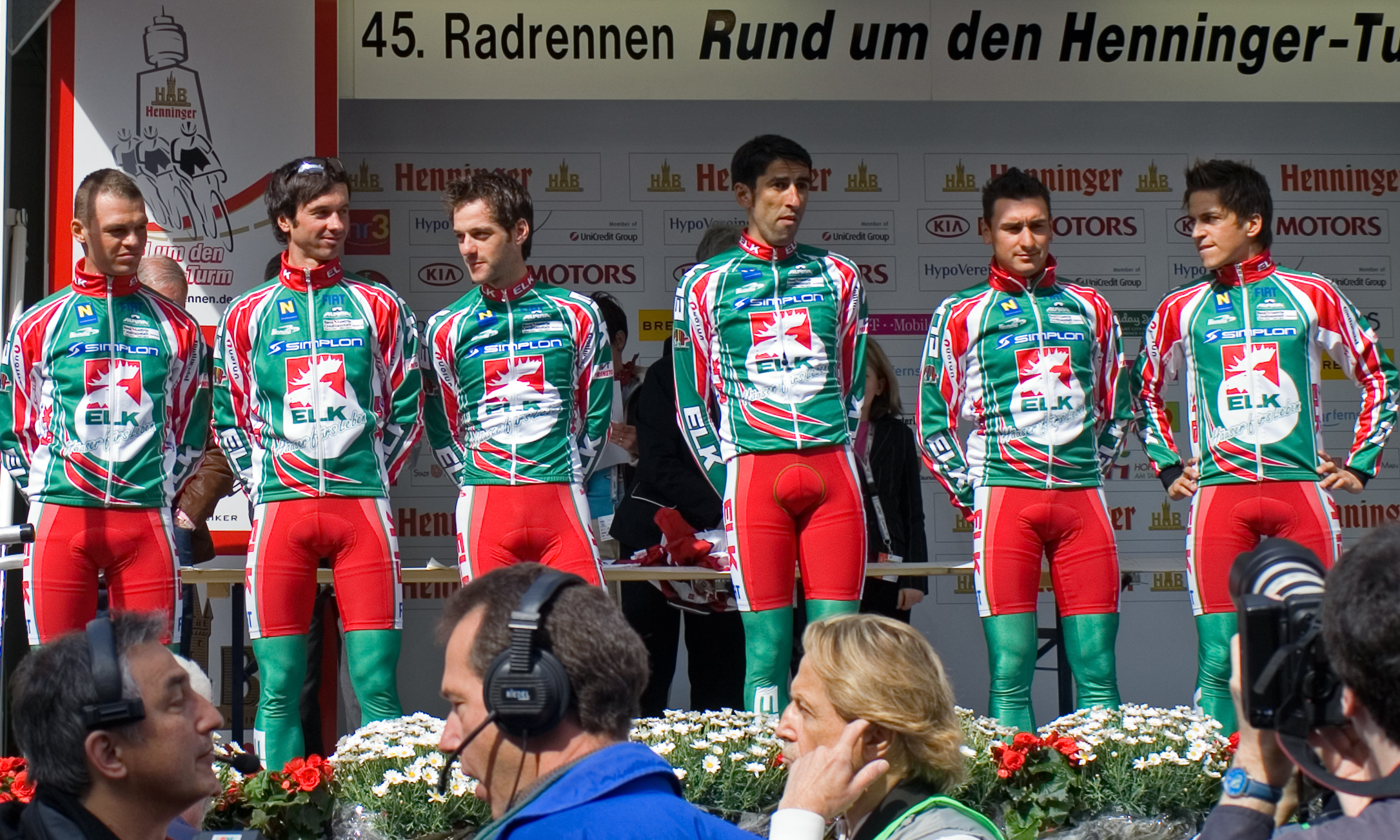

Elk Haus (UCI team code: ELK) was a professional continental cycling team based in Austria and participates in UCI Europe Tour and when selected as a wildcard to UCI ProTour events. The team is managed by Alexander Albrecht, Bernhard Rassinger, Josef Regec and Wolfgang Wesely.

The team folded after the 2009 season, due to financial insecurity. The team's management will take the 2010 season off from competition while trying to put together a new formation for 2011.

== Rosters ==
=== 2009 ===
As of 8 May 2009.

Rider	Date of birth
Stefan Denifl (AUT)	20 September 1987 (age 37)
Markus Eibegger (AUT)	16 October 1984 (age 40)
Clemens Fankhauser (AUT)	2 September 1985 (age 39)
Wolfgang Murer (AUT)	22 December 1979 (age 45)
Steffen Radochla (GER)	19 October 1978 (age 46)
Stefan Rucker (AUT)	20 January 1980 (age 45)
Harald Starzengruber (AUT)	11 April 1981 (age 43)
Jochen Summer (AUT)	28 May 1977 (age 47)
Harald Totschnig (AUT)	6 September 1974 (age 50)
Gerhard Trampusch (AUT)	11 August 1978 (age 46)
Ján Valach (SVK)	19 August 1973 (age 51)

=== 2008 ===
Ages as of 1 January 2008.

Rider	Date of birth
Martina Růžičková (CZE)	22 March 1980 (aged 27)
Pelin Cizgin (AUT)	29 April 1986 (aged 21)
Katarína Uhláriková (SVK)	9 February 1988 (aged 19)
Katharina Blum (GER)	24 October 1984 (aged 23)
Stefanie Degle (GER)	19 October 1986 (aged 21)

Rider	Date of birth
Manuela Grunzweil (AUT)	12 April 1980 (aged 27)
Chrisabel Prischl (AUT)	27 September 1983 (aged 24)
Karin Pauer (AUT)	10 October 1978 (aged 29)
Mette Fischer Andreasen (DEN)	13 April 1983 (aged 24)
Lisa Maria Degle (GER)	21 December 1988 (aged 19)
