= 2020 Okolo Slovenska =

2020 Tour of Slovakia
2020 UCI Europe Tour

Race details
- Dates: 16 – 19 September 2020
- Stages: 4
- Distance: 673.1 km (418.2 mi)

Results
Jersey awarded to the overall winner	Winner	Jannik Steimle (GER)	(Deceuninck–Quick-Step)
	Second	Nico Denz (GER)	(Team Sunweb)
	Third	Shane Archbold (NZL)	(Deceuninck–Quick-Step)
Jersey awarded to the points classification winner	Points	Martin Laas (EST)	(Bora–Hansgrohe)
Jersey awarded to the mountains classification winner	Mountains	Kenny Molly (BEL)	(Bingoal–Wallonie Bruxelles)
Jersey awarded to the youth classification winner	Youth	Andreas Leknessund (NOR)	(Uno-X Pro Cycling Team)
	Team	Deceuninck–Quick-Step	

The 2020 Okolo Slovenska (transl. Tour of Slovakia) was a five-stage men's professional road cycling race. The race was the 64th edition of the Okolo Slovenska. It was rated as a 2.1 event as part of the 2020 UCI Europe Tour. The race started in Žilina on 16 September and finished on 19 September in Skalica.

== Route ==
Stage characteristics and winners
Stage	Date	Route	Distance	Type	Winner
1a	16 September	Žilina to Žilina	106.4 km (66.1 mi)	Hilly stage	Martin Laas (EST)
1b	16 September	Žilina	7.1 km (4.4 mi)	Individual time trial	Jannik Steimle (GER)
2	17 September	Žilina to Banská Bystrica	206.6 km (128.4 mi)	Medium Mountain stage	Nico Denz (GER)
3	18 September	Banská Bystrica to Žiar nad Hronom	181.3 km (112.7 mi)	Hilly stage	Martin Laas (EST)
4	19 September	Topoľčianky to Skalica	171.7 km (106.7 mi)	Flat stage	Rudy Barbier (FRA)
	Total		673.1 km (418.2 mi)		

== Teams ==
Eighteen teams, consisting of five UCI WorldTeams, six UCI ProTeams, six UCI Continental teams, and the Slovakian national team, participated in the race. Vini Zabù–KTM, with five riders, was the only team that did not enter six riders into the race. 107 of the 125 riders in the race finished.

UCI WorldTeams

- Bora–Hansgrohe
- Cofidis
- Deceuninck–Quick-Step
- Israel Start-Up Nation
- Team Sunweb

UCI ProTeams

- Alpecin–Fenix
- Bingoal–Wallonie Bruxelles
- Gazprom–RusVelo
- Team Novo Nordisk
- Uno-X Pro Cycling Team
- Vini Zabù–KTM

UCI Continental Teams

- Adria Mobil
- Cycling Team Friuli ASD
- Dukla Banská Bystrica
- Elkov–Kasper
- Hrinkow Advarics Cycleang
- Mazowsze Serce Polski

National Teams

- Slovakia

== Stages ==
=== Stage 1a ===
16 September 2020 — Žilina to Žilina, 106.4 km (66.1 mi)

Stage 1a Result
Rank	Rider	Team	Time
1	Martin Laas (EST)	Bora–Hansgrohe	2h 30' 38"
2	Shane Archbold (NZL)	Deceuninck–Quick-Step	+ 0"
3	Sean De Bie (BEL)	Bingoal–Wallonie Bruxelles	+ 0"
4	Jay McCarthy (AUS)	Bora–Hansgrohe	+ 0"
5	Rudy Barbier (FRA)	Israel Start-Up Nation	+ 0"
6	Adam Ťoupalík (CZE)	Elkov–Kasper	+ 2"
7	Jempy Drucker (LUX)	Bora–Hansgrohe	+ 2"
8	David van der Poel (NED)	Alpecin–Fenix	+ 2"
9	Lars Saugstad (NOR)	Uno-X Pro Cycling Team	+ 2"
10	Dominik Neuman (CZE)	Elkov–Kasper	+ 2"

General classification after Stage 1a
Rank	Rider	Team	Time
1	Martin Laas (EST)	Bora–Hansgrohe	2h 30' 32"
2	Shane Archbold (NZL)	Deceuninck–Quick-Step	+ 2"
3	Sean De Bie (BEL)	Bingoal–Wallonie Bruxelles	+ 4"
4	Jay McCarthy (AUS)	Bora–Hansgrohe	+ 6"
5	Rudy Barbier (FRA)	Israel Start-Up Nation	+ 6"
6	Jonas Rapp (GER)	Hrinkow Advarics Cycleang	+ 6"
7	Adam Ťoupalík (CZE)	Elkov–Kasper	+ 8"
8	Jempy Drucker (LUX)	Bora–Hansgrohe	+ 8"
9	David van der Poel (NED)	Alpecin–Fenix	+ 8"
10	Lars Saugstad (NOR)	Uno-X Pro Cycling Team	+ 8"

=== Stage 1b ===
16 September 2020 — Žilina, 7.1 km (4.4 mi) (ITT)

Stage 1b Result
Rank	Rider	Team	Time
1	Jannik Steimle (GER)	Deceuninck–Quick-Step	7' 55"
2	Nico Denz (GER)	Team Sunweb	+ 6"
3	Andreas Leknessund (NOR)	Uno-X Pro Cycling Team	+ 6"
4	Jonathan Milan (ITA)	Cycling Team Friuli ASD	+ 6"
5	Johan Price-Pejtersen (DEN)	Uno-X Pro Cycling Team	+ 7"
6	Jasha Sütterlin (GER)	Team Sunweb	+ 8"
7	Chad Haga (USA)	Team Sunweb	+ 11"
8	Thymen Arensman (NED)	Team Sunweb	+ 11"
9	Yves Lampaert (BEL)	Deceuninck–Quick-Step	+ 11"
10	Shane Archbold (NZL)	Deceuninck–Quick-Step	+ 15"

General classification after Stage 1b
Rank	Rider	Team	Time
1	Jannik Steimle (GER)	Deceuninck–Quick-Step	2h 38' 35"
2	Nico Denz (GER)	Team Sunweb	+ 6"
3	Andreas Leknessund (NOR)	Uno-X Pro Cycling Team	+ 7"
4	Jasha Sütterlin (GER)	Team Sunweb	+ 9"
5	Shane Archbold (NZL)	Deceuninck–Quick-Step	+ 9"
6	Chad Haga (USA)	Team Sunweb	+ 12"
7	Thymen Arensman (NED)	Team Sunweb	+ 12"
8	Yves Lampaert (BEL)	Deceuninck–Quick-Step	+ 12"
9	Morten Hulgaard (DEN)	Uno-X Pro Cycling Team	+ 17"
10	Jakub Otruba (CZE)	Elkov–Kasper	+ 18"

=== Stage 2 ===
17 September 2020 — Žilina to Banská Bystrica, 206.6 km (128.4 mi)

Stage 2 Result
Rank	Rider	Team	Time
1	Nico Denz (GER)	Team Sunweb	5h 01' 41"
2	Jannik Steimle (GER)	Deceuninck–Quick-Step	+ 0"
3	Jempy Drucker (LUX)	Bora–Hansgrohe	+ 0"
4	Mihkel Räim (EST)	Israel Start-Up Nation	+ 1"
5	Shane Archbold (NZL)	Deceuninck–Quick-Step	+ 1"
6	Emmanuel Morin (FRA)	Cofidis	+ 1"
7	Jenthe Biermans (BEL)	Israel Start-Up Nation	+ 1"
8	Vyacheslav Kuznetsov (RUS)	Gazprom–RusVelo	+ 1"
9	Charles Planet (FRA)	Team Novo Nordisk	+ 1"
10	Adam Ťoupalík (CZE)	Elkov–Kasper	+ 1"

General classification after Stage 2
Rank	Rider	Team	Time
1	Jannik Steimle (GER)	Deceuninck–Quick-Step	7h 40' 07"
2	Nico Denz (GER)	Team Sunweb	+ 0"
3	Shane Archbold (NZL)	Deceuninck–Quick-Step	+ 16"
4	Andreas Leknessund (NOR)	Uno-X Pro Cycling Team	+ 17"
5	Jasha Sütterlin (GER)	Team Sunweb	+ 19"
6	Chad Haga (USA)	Team Sunweb	+ 22"
7	Yves Lampaert (BEL)	Deceuninck–Quick-Step	+ 22"
8	Jempy Drucker (LUX)	Bora–Hansgrohe	+ 23"
9	Morten Hulgaard (DEN)	Uno-X Pro Cycling Team	+ 27"
10	Jakub Otruba (CZE)	Elkov–Kasper	+ 28"

=== Stage 3 ===
18 September 2020 — Banská Bystrica to Žiar nad Hronom, 181.3 km (112.7 mi)

Stage 3 Result
Rank	Rider	Team	Time
1	Martin Laas (EST)	Bora–Hansgrohe	4h 12' 24"
2	Sean De Bie (BEL)	Bingoal–Wallonie Bruxelles	+ 0"
3	David van der Poel (NED)	Alpecin–Fenix	+ 0"
4	Emmanuel Morin (FRA)	Cofidis	+ 0"
5	Jannik Steimle (GER)	Deceuninck–Quick-Step	+ 0"
6	Marcel Meisen (GER)	Alpecin–Fenix	+ 0"
7	Guillaume Boivin (CAN)	Israel Start-Up Nation	+ 0"
8	Vyacheslav Kuznetsov (RUS)	Gazprom–RusVelo	+ 0"
9	Riccardo Stacchiotti (ITA)	Vini Zabù–KTM	+ 0"
10	Jempy Drucker (LUX)	Bora–Hansgrohe	+ 0"

General classification after Stage 3
Rank	Rider	Team	Time
1	Jannik Steimle (GER)	Deceuninck–Quick-Step	11h 52' 31"
2	Nico Denz (GER)	Team Sunweb	+ 0"
3	Shane Archbold (NZL)	Deceuninck–Quick-Step	+ 14"
4	Andreas Leknessund (NOR)	Uno-X Pro Cycling Team	+ 17"
5	Jasha Sütterlin (GER)	Team Sunweb	+ 19"
6	Chad Haga (USA)	Team Sunweb	+ 22"
7	Jempy Drucker (LUX)	Bora–Hansgrohe	+ 22"
8	Yves Lampaert (BEL)	Deceuninck–Quick-Step	+ 22"
9	Jenthe Biermans (BEL)	Israel Start-Up Nation	+ 25"
10	Morten Hulgaard (DEN)	Uno-X Pro Cycling Team	+ 27"

=== Stage 4 ===
19 September 2020 — Topoľčianky to Skalica, 171.7 km (106.7 mi)

Stage 4 Result
Rank	Rider	Team	Time
1	Rudy Barbier (FRA)	Israel Start-Up Nation	3h 56' 37"
2	Alvaro Hodeg (COL)	Deceuninck–Quick-Step	+ 0"
3	Martin Laas (EST)	Bora–Hansgrohe	+ 0"
4	David van der Poel (NED)	Alpecin–Fenix	+ 0"
5	Adam Ťoupalík (CZE)	Elkov–Kasper	+ 0"
6	Erik Resell (NOR)	Uno-X Pro Cycling Team	+ 0"
7	Jempy Drucker (LUX)	Bora–Hansgrohe	+ 0"
8	Nico Denz (GER)	Team Sunweb	+ 0"
9	Sean De Bie (BEL)	Bingoal–Wallonie Bruxelles	+ 0"
10	Jannik Steimle (GER)	Deceuninck–Quick-Step	+ 0"

General classification after Stage 4
Rank	Rider	Team	Time
1	Jannik Steimle (GER)	Deceuninck–Quick-Step	15h 49' 04"
2	Nico Denz (GER)	Team Sunweb	+ 0"
3	Shane Archbold (NZL)	Deceuninck–Quick-Step	+ 18"
4	Andreas Leknessund (NOR)	Uno-X Pro Cycling Team	+ 21"
5	Jasha Sütterlin (GER)	Team Sunweb	+ 23"
6	Chad Haga (USA)	Team Sunweb	+ 26"
7	Jempy Drucker (LUX)	Bora–Hansgrohe	+ 26"
8	Yves Lampaert (BEL)	Deceuninck–Quick-Step	+ 26"
9	Jakub Otruba (CZE)	Elkov–Kasper	+ 29"
10	Jenthe Biermans (BEL)	Israel Start-Up Nation	+ 29"

== Classification leadership table ==
Classification leadership by stage
Stage	Winner	General classification	Points classification	Mountains classification	Young rider classification	Slovakian rider classification	Team classification	Combativity award
1a	Martin Laas	Martin Laas	Martin Laas	Mathijs Paasschens	Matúš Štoček	Matúš Štoček	Bora–Hansgrohe	Jonas Rapp
1b	Jannik Steimle	Jannik Steimle	Martin Laas	Mathijs Paasschens	Andreas Leknessund	Lukáš Kubiš	Deceuninck–Quick-Step	not awarded
2	Nico Denz	Jannik Steimle	Nico Denz	Kenny Molly	Andreas Leknessund	Lukáš Kubiš	Deceuninck–Quick-Step	Guillaume Boivin
3	Martin Laas	Jannik Steimle	Martin Laas	Kenny Molly	Andreas Leknessund	Lukáš Kubiš	Deceuninck–Quick-Step	Kristjan Hočevar
4	Rudy Barbier	Jannik Steimle	Martin Laas	Kenny Molly	Andreas Leknessund	Lukáš Kubiš	Deceuninck–Quick-Step	Jonas Rapp
Final		Jannik Steimle	Martin Laas	Kenny Molly	Andreas Leknessund	Lukáš Kubiš	Deceuninck–Quick-Step	Not awarded

== Final classification standings ==
Legend
Denotes the winner of the general classification	Denotes the winner of the young rider classification
Denotes the winner of the points classification	Denotes the winner of the Slovakian rider classification
Denotes the winner of the mountains classification	

=== General classification ===
Final general classification (1–10)
Rank	Rider	Team	Time
1	Jannik Steimle (GER)	Deceuninck–Quick-Step	15h 49' 04"
2	Nico Denz (GER)	Team Sunweb	+ 0"
3	Shane Archbold (NZL)	Deceuninck–Quick-Step	+ 18"
4	Andreas Leknessund (NOR)	Uno-X Pro Cycling Team	+ 21"
5	Jasha Sütterlin (GER)	Team Sunweb	+ 23"
6	Chad Haga (USA)	Team Sunweb	+ 26"
7	Jempy Drucker (LUX)	Bora–Hansgrohe	+ 26"
8	Yves Lampaert (BEL)	Deceuninck–Quick-Step	+ 26"
9	Jakub Otruba (CZE)	Elkov–Kasper	+ 29"
10	Jenthe Biermans (BEL)	Israel Start-Up Nation	+ 29"

=== Points classification ===
Final points classification (1–10)
Rank	Rider	Team	Points
1	Martin Laas (EST)	Bora–Hansgrohe	52
2	Nico Denz (GER)	Team Sunweb	47
3	Jannik Steimle (GER)	Deceuninck–Quick-Step	43
4	Shane Archbold (NZL)	Deceuninck–Quick-Step	37
5	Jenthe Biermans (BEL)	Israel Start-Up Nation	31
6	Sean De Bie (BEL)	Bingoal–Wallonie Bruxelles	29
7	Rudy Barbier (FRA)	Israel Start-Up Nation	28
8	David van der Poel (NED)	Alpecin–Fenix	25
9	Jempy Drucker (LUX)	Bora–Hansgrohe	24
10	Alvaro Hodeg (COL)	Deceuninck–Quick-Step	17

=== Mountains classification ===
Final mountains classification (1–10)
Rank	Rider	Team	Points
1	Kenny Molly (BEL)	Bingoal–Wallonie Bruxelles	57
2	Mathijs Paasschens (NED)	Bingoal–Wallonie Bruxelles	42
3	Jonas Rapp (GER)	Hrinkow Advarics Cycleang	33
4	Joel Suter (SUI)	Bingoal–Wallonie Bruxelles	27
5	Guillaume Boivin (CAN)	Israel Start-Up Nation	27
6	Robert Power (AUS)	Team Sunweb	18
7	Michael Kukrle (CZE)	Elkov–Kasper	15
8	Martin Haring (SVK)	Dukla Banská Bystrica	15
9	Kristjan Hočevar (SLO)	Adria Mobil	14
10	Gabriele Petrelli (ITA)	Cycling Team Friuli ASD	14

=== Young rider classification ===
Final young rider classification (1–10)
Rank	Rider	Team	Time
1	Andreas Leknessund (NOR)	Uno-X Pro Cycling Team	15h 49' 25"
2	Jakub Otruba (CZE)	Elkov–Kasper	+ 8"
3	Morten Hulgaard (DEN)	Uno-X Pro Cycling Team	+ 10"
4	Alexis Renard (FRA)	Israel Start-Up Nation	+ 17"
5	Ben Tulett (GBR)	Alpecin–Fenix	+ 58"
6	Joel Suter (SUI)	Bingoal–Wallonie Bruxelles	+ 1' 05"
7	Davide Bais (ITA)	Cycling Team Friuli ASD	+ 1' 13"
8	Kristjan Hočevar (SLO)	Adria Mobil	+ 3' 16"
9	Lukáš Kubiš (SVK)	Dukla Banská Bystrica	+ 4' 10"
10	Gabriele Petrelli (ITA)	Cycling Team Friuli ASD	+ 4' 36"

=== Slovakian rider classification ===
Final Slovakian rider classification (1–10)
Rank	Rider	Team	Time
1	Lukáš Kubiš	Dukla Banská Bystrica	15h 53' 35"
2	Ľuboš Malovec	Slovakia	+ 15' 50"
3	Ján Andrej Cully	Dukla Banská Bystrica	+ 22' 30"
4	Juraj Bellan	Dukla Banská Bystrica	+ 23' 39"
5	Patrik Tybor	Dukla Banská Bystrica	+ 24' 30"
6	Marek Čanecký	Dukla Banská Bystrica	+ 25' 27"
7	Juraj Sagan	Bora–Hansgrohe	+ 27' 03"
8	Martin Haring	Dukla Banská Bystrica	+ 30' 18"
9	Simon Nagy	Slovakia	+ 30' 30"
10	Samuel Oros	Slovakia	+ 31' 35"

=== Team classification ===
Final team classification (1–10)
Rank	Team	Time
1	Deceuninck–Quick-Step	47h 28' 18"
2	Team Sunweb	+ 2"
3	Elkov–Kasper	+ 39"
4	Israel Start-Up Nation	+ 52"
5	Bora–Hansgrohe	+ 1' 10"
6	Alpecin–Fenix	+ 1' 12"
7	Bingoal–Wallonie Bruxelles	+ 1' 14"
8	Cofidis	+ 1' 17"
9	Gazprom–RusVelo	+ 1' 35"
10	Adria Mobil	+ 5' 02"

== See also ==
- 2020 in men's road cycling
- 2020 in sports
