= 2007 UCI Road World Championships – Men's road race =

Men's Individual Road Race
2007 UCI Road World Championships
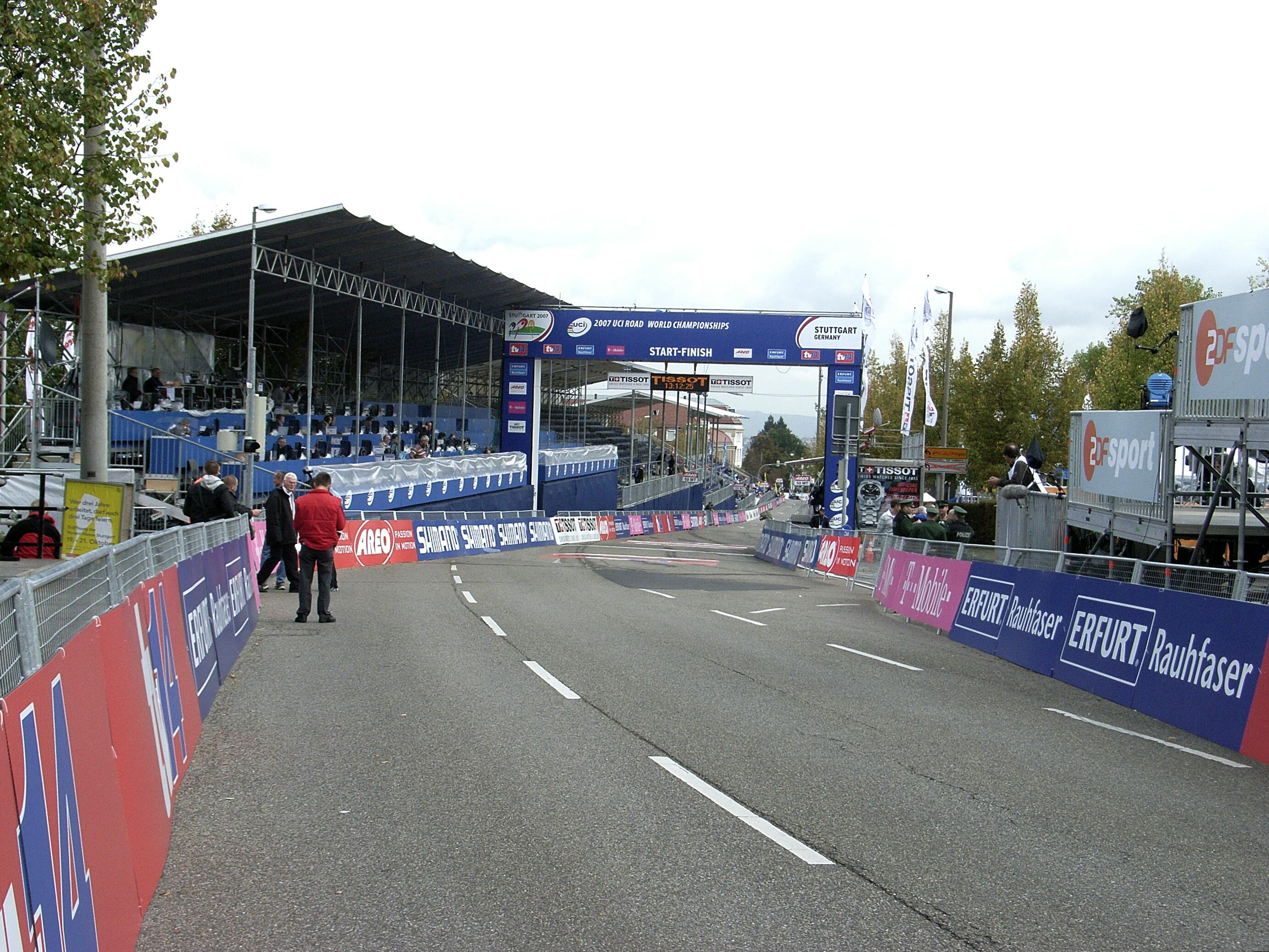
- Finish line in Stuttgart

Race details
- Dates: September 30, 2007
- Stages: 1
- Distance: 267.4 km (166.2 mi)
- Winning time: 06h 44' 43"

Medalists
	Gold	Paolo Bettini (ITA)	(Italy)
	Silver	Alexandr Kolobnev (RUS)	(Russia)
	Bronze	Stefan Schumacher (GER)	(Germany)

The 2007 UCI Road World Championships - Men's Road Race took place on September 30, 2007. The Championship was won for a second year in succession by the Italian Paolo Bettini, who outsprinted the rest of a five-man group in the final 500 metres. The Russian Alexandr Kolobnev took the silver medal and Stefan Schumacher of Germany captured third place for the bronze medal.

The Championships were hosted by the Germany city of Stuttgart, and featured several laps of a tough circuit, amounting to almost 270 kilometres of racing.

== Final classification ==
September 30, 2007: Stuttgart, 267.4 km (14 laps of 19.1 km each)

Rank	Rider	Country	Time
1	Paolo Bettini	Italy	6h 44'43"
1	Alexandr Kolobnev	Russia	s.t.
1	Stefan Schumacher	Germany	s.t.
4	Fränk Schleck	Luxembourg	s.t.
5	Cadel Evans	Australia	s.t.
6	Davide Rebellin	Italy	at 6"
7	Samuel Sánchez	Spain	at 8"
8	Philippe Gilbert	Belgium	s.t.
9	Fabian Wegmann	Germany	s.t.
10	Martin Elmiger	Switzerland	s.t.
11	Thomas Dekker	Netherlands	s.t.
12	Michael Boogerd	Netherlands	at 14"
13	Björn Leukemans	Belgium	at 15"
14	Óscar Freire	Spain	at 49"
15	Aleksandr Kuschynski	Belarus	s.t.
16	Alexandre Usov	Belarus	s.t.
17	Beat Zberg	Switzerland	s.t.
18	Erik Zabel	Germany	s.t.
19	Thor Hushovd	Norway	s.t.
20	Radoslav Rogina	Croatia	s.t.
21	Murilo Fischer	Brazil	s.t.
22	Matej Mugerli	Slovenia	s.t.
23	George Hincapie	United States	s.t.
24	Marcus Ljungqvist	Sweden	s.t.
25	Chris Anker Sørensen	Denmark	s.t.
26	Jurgen Van Goolen	Belgium	s.t.
27	Leonardo Duque	Colombia	s.t.
28	Rene Mandri	Estonia	s.t.
29	Gustav Larsson	Sweden	s.t.
30	Pierrick Fédrigo	France	s.t.
31	Thomas Löfkvist	Sweden	s.t.
32	Alexander Efimkin	Russia	s.t.
33	Tomasz Marczyński	Poland	s.t.
34	Ján Valach	Slovakia	s.t.
35	Sebastian Langeveld	Netherlands	s.t.
36	Christian Vande Velde	United States	s.t.

Rank	Rider	Country	Time
37	Nuno Ribeiro	Portugal	s.t.
38	Christian Pfannberger	Austria	s.t.
39	Unai Etxebarria Arana	Venezuela	s.t.
40	David George	South Africa	s.t.
41	Ludovic Turpin	France	s.t.
42	Kurt Asle Arvesen	Norway	s.t.
43	Vladimir Efimkin	Russia	s.t.
44	Sergey Lagutin	Uzbekistan	s.t.
45	Mario Aerts	Belgium	s.t.
46	Vladimir Karpets	Russia	s.t.
47	Denis Menchov	Russia	s.t.
48	Przemysław Niemiec	Poland	s.t.
49	Manuel Beltrán Martinez	Spain	s.t.
50	Damiano Cunego	Italy	at 57"
51	Filippo Pozzato	Italy	s.t.
52	Alessandro Ballan	Italy	s.t.
53	Allan Davis	Australia	at 1'05"
54	David Millar	Great Britain	s.t.
55	Matthew Lloyd	Australia	at 1'10"
56	Karsten Kroon	Netherlands	at 1'24"
57	Alejandro Valverde	Spain	at 2'47"
58	Matija Kvasina	Croatia	at 3'10"
59	Kristjan Fajt	Slovenia	at 3'38"
60	Gorazd Štangelj	Slovenia	at 3'41"
61	Kanstantsin Siutsou	Belarus	at 5'17"
62	Alessandro Bertolini	Italy	at 6'01"
63	Greg Van Avermaet	Belgium	at 6'34"
64	Maxime Monfort	Belgium	at 6'52"
65	Joaquim Rodríguez Oliver	Spain	at 7'52"
66	Simon Gerrans	Australia	at 8'09"
67	Sylvain Chavanel	France	s.t.
68	Thomas Voeckler	France	at 15'51"
69	Erki Pütsep	Estonia	s.t.
70	László Bodrogi	Hungary	at 17'10"
71	Vladimir Tuychiev	Uzbekistan	at 21'57"
72	Hossein Askari	Iran	s.t.

=== Did not finish ===
124 riders failed to finish the race. Marzio Bruseghin of Italy was disqualified, and José Rodrigues of Portugal did not start the race.

Rider	Country
Carlos Sastre	Spain
Stéphane Goubert	France
Robert Gesink	Netherlands
Carlos Barredo	Spain
Sergei Yakovlev	Kazakhstan
Hernâni Brôco	Portugal
Marcus Burghardt	Germany
Fabian Cancellara	Switzerland
Andy Schleck	Luxembourg
Philip Deignan	Ireland
Jens Voigt	Germany
Gerald Ciolek	Germany
Amaël Moinard	France
Vladimir Zagorodniy	Ukraine
Laurens ten Dam	Netherlands
Bobby Julich	United States
Jason McCartney	United States
Christian Knees	Germany
Johan Van Summeren	Belgium
Dominique Rollin	Canada
Andriy Hrivko	Ukraine
Evgeny Petrov	Ireland
Assan Bazayev	Kazakhstan
James Lewis Perry	South Africa
Matti Breschel	Denmark
Juan Antonio Flecha	Spain
Xavier Florencio	Spain
Tomislav Dančulović	Croatia
Jure Golčer	Slovenia
Romain Feillu	France
Sandy Casar	France
Hrvoje Miholjević	Croatia
Martin Mareš	Czech Republic
Andrea Tonti	Italy
Matteo Tosatto	Italy
William Walker	Australia
Piotr Zielinski	Poland
Li Fuyu	China
Petr Benčík	Czech Republic
Maroš Kováč	Slovakia
Glen Chadwick	New Zealand
Matej Jurčo	Slovakia
Yukiya Arashiro	Japan
Takashi Miyazawa	Japan
Vladislav Borisov	Russia
Dmitry Fofonov	Kazakhstan
Bruno Neves	Portugal
Marcin Sapa	Poland
Roman Kreuziger	Czech Republic
Kim Kirchen	Luxembourg
Robert Kišerlovski	Croatia
Michael Rogers	Australia
Luis Felipe Laverde	Colombia
Krzysztof Szczawinski	Poland
Romas Sinicinas	Lithuania
Matej Stare	Slovenia
Hugo Sabido	Portugal
Martín Garrido	Argentina
Frederik Willems	Belgium
Danail Petrov	Bulgaria
Vladimir Gusev	Russia
Roger Hammond	Great Britain
John Devine	United States
Tyler Farrar	United States
Ronny Scholz	Germany
David Kopp	Germany
Volodymyr Bileka	Ukraine

Rider	Country
Dmytro Grabovskyy	Ukraine
Scott Davis	Australia
Jacek Morajko	Poland
Hayden Roulston	New Zealand
Maarten den Bakker	Netherlands
Richard Ochoa	Venezuela
José Serpa	Colombia
Martin Riška	Slovakia
Svein Tuft	Canada
Stéphane Augé	France
Bram Tankink	Netherlands
Matías Médici	Argentina
Nebojša Jovanović	Serbia
Stijn Devolder	Belgium
Juan Pablo Dotti	Argentina
Muradjan Khalmuratov	Uzbekistan
Darren Lill	South Africa
Bernhard Kohl	Austria
Mauricio Ardila	Colombia
Mathew Hayman	Australia
Luis Ministro Moyano	Argentina
Maximiliano Richeze	Argentina
Borut Božič	Slovenia
Mark Cavendish	Great Britain
Daryl Impey	South Africa
Fumiyuki Beppu	Japan
Roman Broniš	Slovakia
Andris Hernández	Venezuela
Koos Moerenhout	Netherlands
Trent Lowe	Australia
Dainius Kairelis	Lithuania
Mehdi Sohrabi	Iran
Jeremy Vennell	New Zealand
Cameron Evans	Canada
Christian Poos	Luxembourg
Kristijan Đurasek	Croatia
Lars Ytting Bak	Denmark
Ruslan Podgornyy	Ukraine
Sergey Kolesnikov	Russia
Juan José Haedo	Argentina
Gerrit Glomser	Austria
Marlon Pérez Arango	Colombia
Žolt Dér	Serbia
Mads Kaggestad	Norway
Laurent Didier	Luxembourg
Mostafa Seyed-Rezaei	Iran
Alex Cano	Colombia
David Zabriskie	United States
Renato Seabra	Brazil
Ricardo Martins	Portugal
Aleksejs Saramotins	Latvia
Medhi Fahridi Kovij	Iran
Ján Šipeky	Slovakia
Dragan Spasic	Serbia
Luciano Pagliarini	Brazil
Robert Hunter	South Africa
Mikhaylo Khalilov	Ukraine

== Nation qualification ==
14 to be enrolled, 9 to start
Italy
Spain
Australia
Luxembourg
Germany
Russia
Belgium
United States
Netherlands
France
9 to be enrolled, 6 to start
South Africa
Colombia
Argentina
Iran
Poland
Slovenia
Portugal
Ukraine
Slovakia
Croatia
5 to be enrolled, 3 to start
Tunisia
Brazil
Canada
Venezuela
Japan
Kazakhstan
Denmark
Norway
Austria
Belarus
Estonia
Czech Republic
Switzerland
Latvia
Serbia
Lithuania
New Zealand
Great Britain
Sweden
2 to be enrolled, 1 to start
China
Hungary
Ireland
Libya
Costa Rica
Cuba
Chile
Bulgaria
