= 2016 Tinkoff season =

Team Tinkoff
- 2016 season
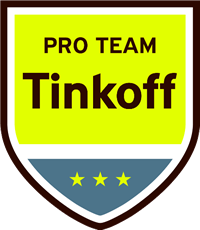
- UCI code: TNK
- Status: UCI ProTeam
- Owner: Oleg Tinkov
- Manager: Steven de Jongh
- Main sponsor(s): Tinkoff Bank
- Based: Russia
- Bicycles: Specialized
- Groupset: Shimano

Season victories
- One-day races: 4
- Stage race overall: 3
- Stage race stages: 19
- National Championships: 5

The 2016 season for Tinkoff began in January with the Tour Down Under. As a UCI WorldTeam, they were automatically invited and obligated to send a squad to every event in the UCI World Tour.

== Team roster ==
As of 29 March 2016

| Rider | Date of birth |
|---|---|
| Davide Ballerini (Note: Ballerini joined the team on 1 August as a stagiaire, from Hopplà Petroli Firenze.) (ITA) | 21 September 1994 (aged 21) |
| Erik Baška (SVK) | 12 January 1994 (aged 22) |
| Daniele Bennati (ITA) | 24 September 1980 (aged 35) |
| Adam Blythe (GBR) | 1 October 1989 (aged 26) |
| Manuele Boaro (ITA) | 12 March 1987 (aged 29) |
| Maciej Bodnar (POL) | 7 March 1985 (aged 31) |
| Pavel Brutt (RUS) | 29 January 1982 (aged 34) |
| Alberto Contador (ESP) | 6 December 1982 (aged 33) |
| Lorenzo Fortunato (Note: Fortunato joined the team on 1 August as a stagiaire, from Hopplà Petroli Firenze.) (ITA) | 9 May 1996 (aged 19) |
| Oscar Gatto (ITA) | 1 January 1985 (aged 31) |
| Michael Gogl (AUT) | 4 November 1993 (aged 22) |
| Jesper Hansen (DEN) | 23 October 1990 (aged 25) |
| Jesús Hernández (ESP) | 28 September 1981 (aged 34) |
| Robert Kišerlovski (CRO) | 9 August 1986 (aged 29) |
| Michael Kolář (SVK) | 21 December 1992 (aged 23) |

| Rider | Date of birth |
|---|---|
| Roman Kreuziger (CZE) | 6 May 1986 (aged 29) |
| Rafał Majka (POL) | 12 September 1989 (aged 26) |
| Jay McCarthy (AUS) | 8 September 1992 (aged 23) |
| Andrea Montagnoli (Note: Montagnoli joined the team on 1 August as a stagiaire, from Hopplà Petroli Firenze.) (ITA) | 27 July 1995 (aged 20) |
| Sérgio Paulinho (POR) | 26 March 1980 (aged 36) |
| Evgeni Petrov (RUS) | 25 May 1978 (aged 37) |
| Paweł Poljański (POL) | 6 May 1990 (aged 25) |
| Michael Rogers (Note: Rogers retired from cycling on April 25.) (AUS) | 20 December 1979 (aged 36) |
| Ivan Rovny (RUS) | 30 September 1987 (aged 28) |
| Juraj Sagan (SVK) | 23 December 1988 (aged 27) |
| Peter Sagan (SVK) | 26 January 1990 (aged 26) |
| Matteo Tosatto (ITA) | 14 May 1974 (aged 41) |
| Yuri Trofimov (RUS) | 26 January 1984 (aged 32) |
| Nikolay Trusov (RUS) | 2 July 1985 (aged 30) |
| Michael Valgren (DEN) | 7 February 1992 (aged 24) |

Riders who joined the team for the 2015 season

| Rider | 2015 team |
|---|---|
| Erik Baška | neo-pro (AWT–GreenWay) |
| Adam Blythe | Orica–GreenEDGE |
| Oscar Gatto | Androni Giocattoli–Sidermec |
| Michael Gogl | Tirol Cycling Team |
| Yuri Trofimov | Team Katusha |

Riders who left the team during or after the 2015 season

| Rider | 2016 team |
|---|---|
| Ivan Basso | Retired |
| Edward Beltrán | EPM–UNE–Área Metropolitana |
| Matti Breschel | Cannondale |
| Christopher Juul-Jensen | Orica–GreenEDGE |
| Michael Mørkøv | Team Katusha |
| Bruno Pires | Team Roth |
| Chris Anker Sørensen | Fortuneo–Vital Concept |
| Oliver Zaugg | IAM Cycling |

== Season victories ==
| Date | Race | Competition | Rider | Country | Location |
|---|---|---|---|---|---|
| 20 January | Tour Down Under, Stage 2 | UCI World Tour | Jay McCarthy (AUS) | Australia | Stirling |
| 24 January | Tour Down Under, Young rider classification | UCI World Tour | Jay McCarthy (AUS) | Australia | |
| 17 February | Vuelta a Andalucía, Stage 1 | UCI Europe Tour | Daniele Bennati (ITA) | Spain | Seville |
| 19 February | Vuelta a Andalucía, Stage 3 | UCI Europe Tour | Oscar Gatto (ITA) | Spain | Padul |
| 21 February | Volta ao Algarve, Stage 5 | UCI Europe Tour | Alberto Contador (ESP) | Portugal | Alto do Malhaõ |
| 15 March | Tirreno–Adriatico, Points classification | UCI World Tour | Peter Sagan (SVK) | Italy | San Benedetto del Tronto |
| 18 March | Handzame Classic | UCI Europe Tour | Erik Baška (SVK) | Belgium | Handzame |
| 27 March | Gent–Wevelgem | UCI World Tour | Peter Sagan (SVK) | Belgium | Wevelgem |
| 31 March | Three Days of De Panne, Stage 3b | UCI Europe Tour | Maciej Bodnar (POL) | Belgium | De Panne |
| 3 April | Tour of Flanders | UCI World Tour | Peter Sagan (SVK) | Belgium | Oudenaarde |
| 9 April | Tour of the Basque Country, Stage 6 | UCI World Tour | Alberto Contador (ESP) | Spain | Eibar |
| 9 April | Tour of the Basque Country, Overall | UCI World Tour | Alberto Contador (ESP) | Spain | |
| 23 April | Tour of Croatia, Stage 5 (TTT) | UCI Europe Tour | (Note: The riders on the squad were Erik Baška, Sérgio Paulinho, Jay McCarthy, Jesper Hansen and Nikolay Trusov, and Kolar and Juraj Sagan) | Croatia | Umag |
| 15 May | Tour of California, Stage 1 | UCI America Tour | Peter Sagan (SVK) | United States | San Diego |
| 18 May | Tour of California, Stage 4 | UCI America Tour | Peter Sagan (SVK) | United States | Monterey County |
| 22 May | Tour of California, Points classification | UCI America Tour | Peter Sagan (SVK) | United States | |
| 5 June | Critérium du Dauphiné, Prologue | UCI World Tour | Alberto Contador (ESP) | France | Les Gets |
| 12 June | Tour de Suisse, Stage 2 | UCI World Tour | Peter Sagan (SVK) | Switzerland | Baar |
| 13 June | Tour de Suisse, Stage 3 | UCI World Tour | Peter Sagan (SVK) | Switzerland | Rheinfelden |
| 3 July | Tour de France, Stage 2 | UCI World Tour | Peter Sagan (SVK) | France | Cherbourg-Octeville |
| 13 July | Tour de France, Stage 11 | UCI World Tour | Peter Sagan (SVK) | France | Montpellier |
| 18 July | Tour de France, Stage 16 | UCI World Tour | Peter Sagan (SVK) | Switzerland | Bern |
| 24 July | Tour de France, Points classification | UCI World Tour | Peter Sagan (SVK) | France | |
| 24 July | Tour de France, Mountains classification | UCI World Tour | Rafał Majka (POL) | France | |
| 24 July | Tour de France, Super-combativity award | UCI World Tour | Peter Sagan (SVK) | France | |
| 27 July | Danmark Rundt, Stage 1 | UCI Europe Tour | Daniele Bennati (ITA) | Denmark | Esbjerg |
| 29 July | Danmark Rundt, Stage 3 | UCI Europe Tour | Michael Valgren (DEN) | Denmark | Vejle |
| 31 July | Danmark Rundt, Overall | UCI Europe Tour | Michael Valgren (DEN) | Denmark | |
| 31 July | Danmark Rundt, Points classification | UCI Europe Tour | Daniele Bennati (ITA) | Denmark | |
| 31 July | Danmark Rundt, Team classification | UCI Europe Tour | (Note: The riders on the squad were Michael Valgren, Daniele Bennati, Manuele Boaro, Erik Baška, Nikolay Trusov, Pavel Brutt, Michael Kolář and Michael Gogl) | Denmark | |
| 6 August | Vuelta a Burgos, Overall | UCI Europe Tour | Alberto Contador (ESP) | Spain | |
| 9 September | Grand Prix Cycliste de Québec | UCI World Tour | Peter Sagan (SVK) | Canada | Quebec |
| 11 September | Vuelta a España, Super-combativity award | UCI World Tour | Alberto Contador (ESP) | Spain | |
| 21 September | Eneco Tour, Stage 3 | UCI World Tour | Peter Sagan (SVK) | Belgium | Ardooie |
| 22 September | Eneco Tour, Stage 4 | UCI World Tour | Peter Sagan (SVK) | Belgium | Sint-Pieters-Leeuw |
| 25 September | Eneco Tour, Points classification | UCI World Tour | Peter Sagan (SVK) | Belgium; Netherlands | |

== National, Continental and World champions 2016 ==
| Date | Discipline | Jersey | Rider | Country | Location |
|---|---|---|---|---|---|
| 22 June | Polish National Time Trial Champion | | Maciej Bodnar (POL) | Poland | Świdnica |
| 26 June | Polish National Road Race Champion | | Rafał Majka (POL) | Poland | Świdnica |
| 26 June | Czech National Road Race Champion | | Roman Kreuziger (CZE) | Czech Republic | Kyjov |
| 26 June | Slovak National Road Race Champion | | Juraj Sagan (SVK) | Czech Republic | Kyjov |
| 26 June | British National Road Race Champion | | Adam Blythe (GBR) | United Kingdom | Stockton-on-Tees |
| 18 September | European Road Race Champion | | Peter Sagan (SVK) | France | Plumelec |
