= Grand Prix of Sharm el-Sheikh =

Road cycling race

Race details
- Region: Egypt
- Discipline: Road
- Competition: UCI Africa Tour
- Type: One-day race

History
- First edition: 2007
- Editions: 3
- Final edition: 2009
- First winner: Ján Šipeky (SVK)
- Most wins: No repeat winners
- Final winner: Ivaïlo Gabrovski (BUL)

The Grand Prix of Sharm el-Sheikh was a one-day road cycling race held annually in Egypt from 2007 to 2009. It was part of UCI Africa Tour as a category 1.2 event.

== Winners ==
Year	Country	Rider	Team
2007	Slovakia	Ján Šipeky	Dukla Trenčín–Merida
2008	Egypt	Amr Mahmoud	
2009	Bulgaria	Ivaïlo Gabrovski	Heraklion–Nessebar
