= Roman Broniš =

Slovakian cyclist (born 1976)

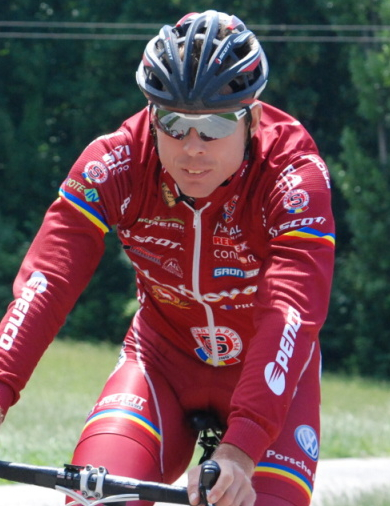

Personal information
- Full name: Roman Broniš
- Born: 17 October 1976 (age 49): Bánovce nad Bebravou, Czechoslovakia; (now Slovakia)
- Height: 1.87 m (6 ft 1 1/2 in)
- Weight: 74 kg (163 lb)

Cycling career
- Sport: Cycling
- Current team: Cycling Academy Trenčín
- Discipline: Road
- Role: Rider (retired); Directeur sportif

Amateur teams
- 2017: CK Spartak Tlmače
- 2018–2019: TJ Slávia ŠG Trenčín

Professional teams
- 2004–2005: Ed' System ZVVZ
- 2006: Dukla Trenčín
- 2007: DHL–Author
- 2008: Dukla Trenčín–Merida
- 2009: CK Windoor's Pribram
- 2010–2011: AC Sparta Praha
- 2012–2015: Dukla Trenčín–Trek
- 2016: CK Příbram Fany Gastro

Managerial team
- 2021–: Cycling Academy Trenčín

Roman Broniš (born 17 October 1976) is a Slovak former road cyclist, who now works as a directeur sportif for UCI Continental team Cycling Academy Trenčín. He represented his nation Slovakia in two editions of the Olympic Games (2000 and 2008).

== Career ==
Born in Bánovce nad Bebravou, Broniš made his official debut as an amateur cyclist at the 2000 Summer Olympics in Sydney, where he did not finish the men's road race against a vast field of more than a hundred cyclists. Broniš later turned professional in 2004, when he signed a two-year contract with Ed' System ZVVZ. Throughout his early sporting career, he competed for three annually contractual cycling teams (Dukla Trenčín, DHL–Author, and Dukla Trenčín–Merida), and also produced numerous triumphs at different stages in both local and global road cycling tournaments, specifically in Coupe des Carpathes (Poland), Tour du Maroc (Morocco), Tour of Libya, and UAE International Emirates Post Tour.

Eight years after competing in his last Olympics, Broniš qualified for his second Slovak squad, as a 33-year-old, in the men's road race at the 2008 Summer Olympics in Beijing by receiving one of the team's three berths from the UCI Europe Tour, along with his teammates Matej Jurčo and Ján Valach. Passing through the 161.2-kilometre (100.2-mile) mark, Broniš could not achieve a best possible result with a severe fatigue under the Beijing's intense heat, as he failed to complete the race for the second straight time in his Olympic career.

== Major results ==
2001
National Road Championships

2nd Team time trial
3rd Road race

2002
1st Stage 1 Tour of Saudi Arabia
3rd Team time trial, National Road Championships
2003
1st Grand Prix Bradlo
1st Stage 3 Grand Prix Cycliste de Gemenc
2nd Coupe des Carpathes
3rd Road race, National Road Championships
2005
3rd Road race, National Road Championships
2006
1st Overall Tour du Maroc
1st Coupe des Carpathes
2007
1st Overall Bałtyk–Karkonosze Tour
2008
National Road Championships

2nd Road race
3rd Time trial

2nd Overall Tour of Libya

1st Stages 2, 3, 4 & 7

3rd Overall UAE International Emirates Post Tour

1st Stage 4

3rd Overall Bałtyk–Karkonosze Tour
2009
1st Time trial, National Road Championships
9th Overall Okolo Slovenska
2011
2nd Time trial, National Road Championships
3rd Overall Course de Solidarność et des Champions Olympiques
4th Overall Grand Prix Chantal Biya
2012
National Road Championships

4th Road race
5th Time trial

2013
5th Road race, National Road Championships
2016
3rd Time trial, National Road Championships
5th Memoriał Andrzeja Trochanowskiego
