= Jakub Novák =

Jakub Novák may refer to:

- Jakub Novák (Slovak cyclist), born 1988
- Jakub Novák (Czech cyclist), born 1990
