= Ján Šipeky =

Slovak bicycle racer

Personal information
- Born: 2 January 1973 (age 53): Košice, Czechoslovakia; (now Slovakia)

Cycling career
- Sport: Cycling
- Current team: Retired
- Discipline: Road
- Role: Rider

Professional teams
- 2001–2002: De Nardi–Pasta Montegrappa
- 2004–2011: Dukla Trenčín

Ján Šipeky (born 2 January 1973 in Košice) is a Slovak former professional cyclist.

== Major results ==
1998
2nd Road race, National Road Championships
2001
1st Team time trial, National Road Championships (with Jan Gazi, Maroš Kováč and Ján Valach)
2002
1st Team time trial, National Road Championships (with Radovan Husár, Maroš Kováč and Ján Valach)
2003
3rd Overall Tour d'Egypte
2005
1st Stage 6 Tour d'Egypte
2006
1st Overall Tour of Maroc
2007
1st Grand Prix de Sharm el-Sheikh
2nd Overall Tour d'Egypte
2008
1st Stage 5 Tour of Libya
