= Martin Mahďar =

Slovak bicycle racer

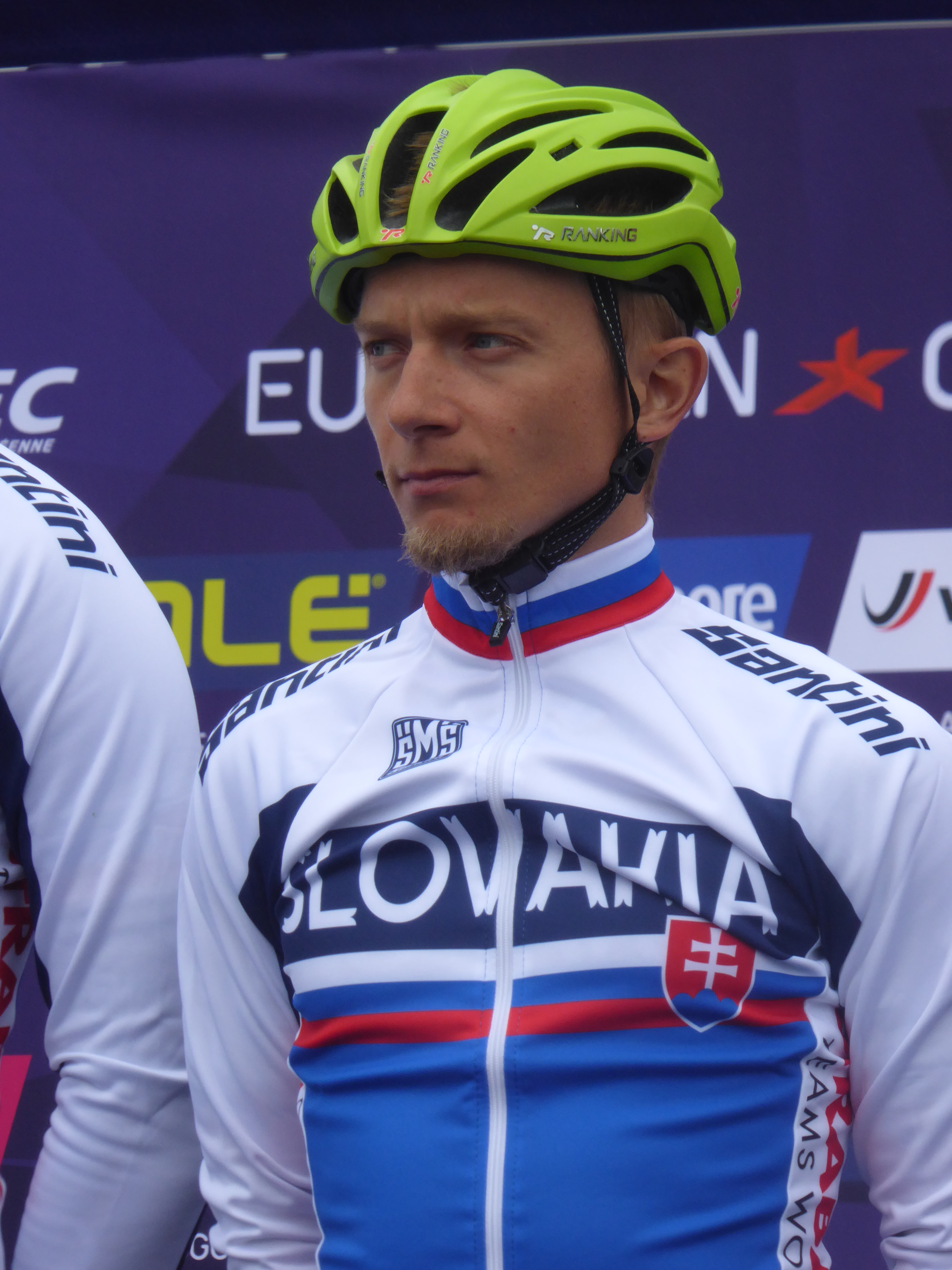
- Mahďar at the 2018 European Road Cycling Championships

Personal information
- Born: 31 July 1989 (age 37): Dubnica nad Váhom, Czechoslovakia; (now Slovakia)

Cycling career
- Sport: Cycling
- Current team: Retired
- Discipline: Road
- Role: Rider

Amateur team
- 2010: Albert Bigot 79

Professional teams
- 2008–2009: Dukla Trenčín–Merida
- 2010–2019: Dukla Trenčín–Merida

Martin Mahďar (born 31 July 1989) is a Slovak former professional cyclist, who competed between 2008 and 2019, for Dukla Banská Bystrica.

== Major results ==
2008
3rd Road race, National Under-23 Road Championships
2009
9th Overall Grand Prix Bradlo
2010
1st Stage 3 Košice–Tatry–Košice
5th Overall Carpathia Couriers Path
2011
1st Road race, National Under-23 Road Championships
9th Banja Luka–Belgrade I
9th Challenge du Prince – Trophée Princier
2013
8th Overall Tour du Maroc
2014
3rd Road race, National Road Championships
10th Visegrad 4 Bicycle Race – GP Hungary
2016
1st Stage 7 Tour du Cameroun
9th Coupe des Carpathes
2017
3rd Overall Grand Prix Chantal Biya

1st Points classification
1st Mountains classification

10th Memorial Imre Riczu
2018
3rd Overall Tour du Cameroun
5th Road race, National Road Championships
