= Pierre Baguette Cycling =

Slovak cycling team

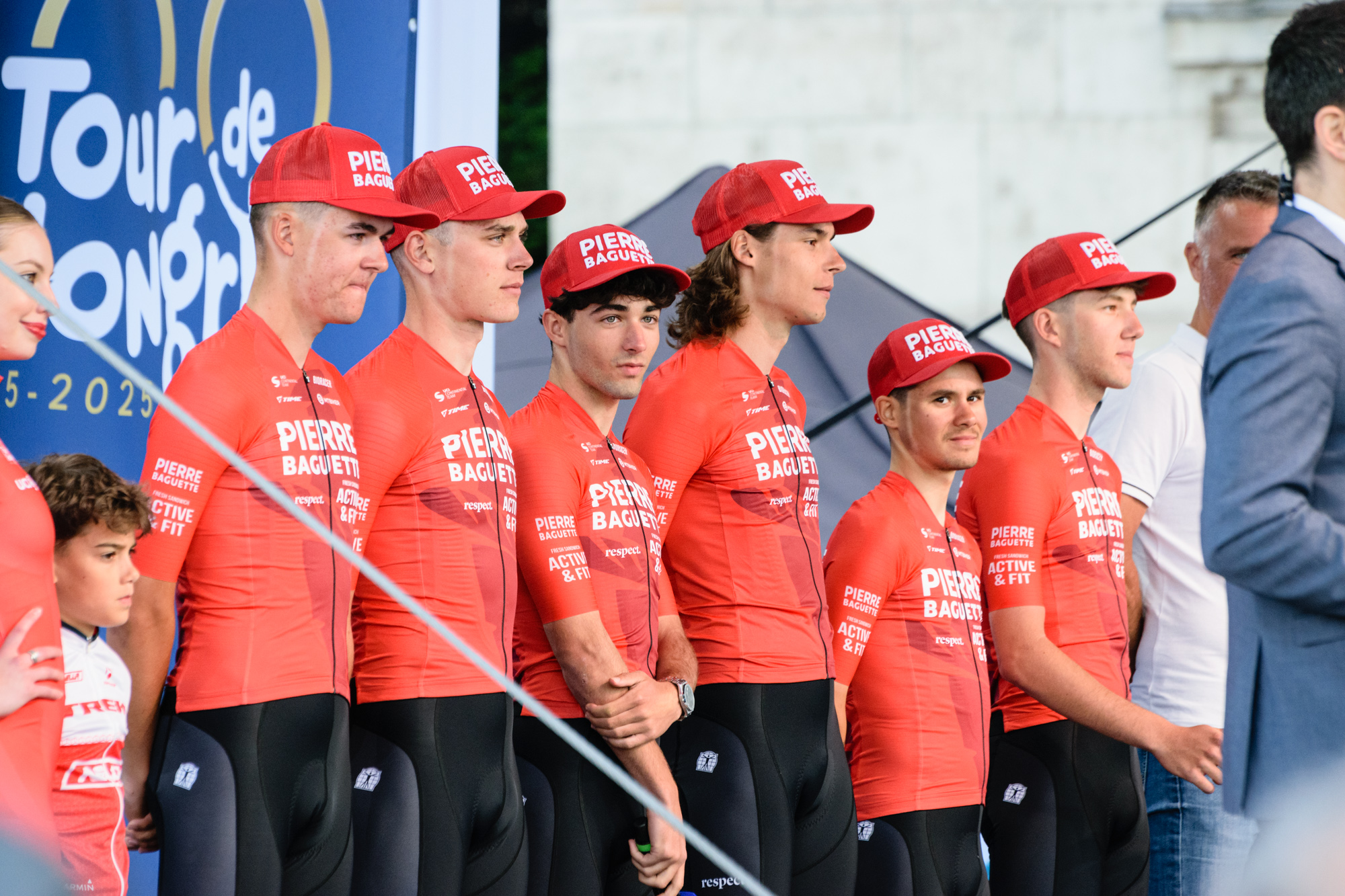
- Pierre Baguette Cycling at the 2025 Tour de Hongrie

Team information
- UCI code: PBC
- Registered: Skalica, Slovakia
- Founded: 2023
- Bicycles: Time

Key personnel
- General manager: Ján Valach
- Team managers: Juraj Sagan; Juraj Tomša

Team name history
2023	RRK Group–Pierre Baguette–Benzinol
2024–	Pierre Baguette Cycling

Pierre Baguette Cycling (UCI team code: PBC) is a Slovak professional road cycling team competing at the UCI Continental level. The team obtained its UCI license in 2023, and is currently managed by former Slovak professional cyclist Ján Valach.

Starting in 2024, Pierre Baguette Cycling signed Peter Sagan, the three times UCI road men's world champion in 2015, 2016 and 2017.

== Team roster ==
As of 9 November 2024.

Rider	Date of birth
Tomáš Badinský (SVK)	30 November 2000 (age 25)
Štěpán Dalecký (CZE)	27 August 2005 (age 21)
Simon Gottstein (SVK)	17 August 2005 (age 21)
Christian Haas (SVK)	12 July 2004 (age 22)
Tomáš Kalojíros (CZE)	3 August 1994 (age 32)
Andrej Líška (SVK)	4 October 2000 (age 26)
Martin Mečiar (SVK)	29 May 2001 (age 25)
Tomáš Novák (CZE)	17 February 2005 (age 21)

Rider	Date of birth
Dušan Oravec (SVK)	30 July 2005 (age 21)
Jakub Říman (CZE)	23 November 2000 (age 25)
Tomáš Sivok (SVK)	24 February 2004 (age 22)
Samuel Skladan (SVK)	22 July 2005 (age 21)
Martin Voltr (CZE)	27 December 2001 (age 24)
Vilém Vostal (SVK)	10 March 2005 (age 21)
Daniel Vysočan (CZE)	17 July 2004 (age 22)

== Major results ==
2024
GP Slovakia, Martin Voltr
GP Czech Republic, Martin Voltr
Stage 2 Okolo Jižních Čech, Andrej Líška
