= Juraj Sagan =

Slovak cyclist

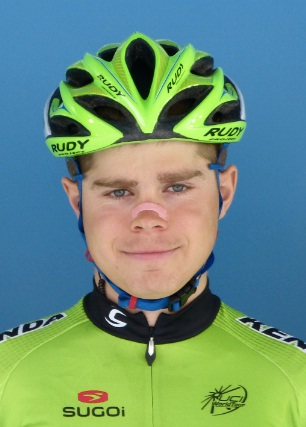
- Sagan at the 2013 Tour of the Basque Country

Personal information
- Full name: Juraj Sagan
- Born: 23 December 1988 (age 37) Žilina, Czechoslovakia
- Height: 1.73 m (5 ft 8 in)
- Weight: 65 kg (143 lb)

Cycling career
- Sport: Cycling
- Current team: Pierre Baguette Cycling
- Discipline: Road
- Role: Rider (retired); Directeur sportif
- Rider type: Puncheur; Domestique

Amateur team
- 2007–2009: Dukla Trenčín–Merida

Professional teams
- 2010–2014: Liquigas–Doimo
- 2015–2016: Tinkoff–Saxo
- 2017–2021: Bora–Hansgrohe
- 2022: Team TotalEnergies

Managerial team
- 2023–: RRK Group–Pierre Baguette–Benzinol

Major wins
- One-day races and Classics National Road Race Championships (2016, 2017, 2019, 2020)

Juraj Sagan (born 23 December 1988) is a Slovak former professional road bicycle racer, who competed as a professional from 2010 to 2022, for the Cannondale, Tinkoff, Bora–Hansgrohe and Team TotalEnergies teams. During his professional career, Sagan took four victories – all of which were at the Slovak National Road Race Championships, in 2016, 2017, 2019 and 2020.

Following his retirement, Sagan now works as a directeur sportif for UCI Continental team Pierre Baguette Cycling.

== Personal life ==
Sagan was born on 23 December 1988 in Žilina, Czechoslovakia (now Slovakia). His younger brother, Peter Sagan, has also competed professionally as a cyclist, winning more than 100 races, including three consecutive world titles between 2015 and 2017.

== Major results ==
2006
1st Stage 1 La Coupe du Président de la Ville de Grudziądz
9th Road race, UCI Junior World Championships
2007
9th Overall Grand Prix Cycliste de Gemenc
2008
5th Road race, National Road Championships
8th Grand Prix Bradlo
2009
1st GP Boka
4th Road race, National Road Championships
7th Rund um den Finanzplatz Eschborn-Frankfurt U23
8th Trofeo Banca Popolare di Vicenza
2010
5th Rund um den Finanzplatz Eschborn-Frankfurt U23
6th Giro del Veneto
2011
4th Road race, National Road Championships
2015
2nd Road race, National Road Championships
2016
1st Road race, National Road Championships
1st Stage 5 (TTT) Tour of Croatia
2017
1st Road race, National Road Championships
2018
2nd Road race, National Road Championships
10th Grand Prix of Aargau Canton
2019
1st Road race, National Road Championships
2020
1st Road race, National Road Championships

=== Grand Tour general classification results timeline ===
Grand Tour	2017
Giro d'Italia	—
Tour de France	DNF
Vuelta a España	—

Legend
—	Did not compete
DNF	Did not finish
