= Luboš Pelánek =

Czech cyclist

- Luboš Pelánek

Personal information
- Born: 21 July 1981 (age 45): Třebíč, Czechoslovakia; (now Czech Republic)

Cycling career
- Sport: Cycling
- Discipline: Road
- Role: Rider

Professional teams
- 2000–2001: PSK–Unit Expert
- 2005–2006: Relax–Fuenlabrada
- 2007: AC Sparta Praha
- 2008: Lampre
- 2009: Amore & Vita–McDonald's
- 2011: Farnese Vini–Neri Sottoli
- 2013: Team Vorarlberg
- 2014: Differdange–Losch
- 2018: Kőbánya Cycling Team

Luboš Pelánek (born 21 July 1981 in Třebíč) is a Czech former professional road bicycle racer.

== Major results ==
2002
2nd Overall Grand Prix Bradlo
2008
9th Giro dell'Appennino
