= Adrian Honkisz =

Polish cyclist

Personal information
- Full name: Adrian Honkisz
- Born: 28 February 1988 (age 38)
- Height: 1.76 m (5 ft 9 in)
- Weight: 61 kg (134 lb)

Cycling career
- Sport: Cycling
- Discipline: Road
- Role: Rider

Amateur teams
- 2019: Krismar–Big Silvant–Warmia
- 2020: Dar-Bud Team

Professional teams
- 2007: Miche
- 2009–2016: CCC–Polsat–Polkowice
- 2017–2018: Wibatech 7R Fuji

Adrian Honkisz (born 27 February 1988) is a Polish racing cyclist, who last rode for Polish amateur team Dar-Bud Team.

== Major results ==
2008
2nd Road race, National Under-23 Road Championships
10th Gran Premio Industrie del Marmo
10th Trofeo Zsšdi
2009
8th Overall Tour du Maroc

1st Stage 2

2010
1st Overall Carpathia Couriers Path

1st Stages 2 & 3

3rd Tartu GP
3rd Puchar Ministra Obrony Narodowej
4th Memoriał Henryka Łasaka
6th Coupe des Carpathes
7th Overall Szlakiem Walk Majora Hubala

1st Stage 2

2012
1st Stage 4 Course de la Solidarité Olympique
1st Mountains classification Okolo Slovenska
8th Overall Tour of Małopolska
2013
1st Coupe des Carpathes
2nd Road race, National Road Championships
7th Overall Tour of Hainan
2014
1st Stage 3a (TTT) Sibiu Cycling Tour
2015
1st Coupe des Carpathes
6th Road race, National Road Championships
10th GP Polski, Visegrad 4 Bicycle Race
2016
4th GP Polski, Visegrad 4 Bicycle Race
7th Korona Kocich Gór
7th Coupe des Carpathes
2017
6th Korona Kocich Gór
7th Szlakiem Wielkich Jezior
2018
1st Mountains classification Tour of Małopolska
2019
5th Race Horizon Park Maidan
6th Chabany Race
