= Martin Prázdnovský =

Slovakian bicycle racer

Personal information
- Born: 22 October 1975 (age 50): Streda nad Bodrogom, Czechoslovakia; (now Slovakia)

Cycling career
- Sport: Cycling
- Current team: Retired
- Discipline: Road
- Role: Rider

Professional teams
- 2000: Wüstenrot–ZVVZ
- 2001: Atlas–Lukullus–Ambra
- 2002: De Nardi–Pasta Montegrappa
- 2005: CK ŽP Šport AS Podbrezová
- 2006–2007: Team Sparebanken Vest
- 2008: AC Sparta Praha
- 2009: Cycling Club Bourgas

Martin Prázdnovský (born 22 October 1975 in Streda nad Bodrogom) is a Slovak former cyclist.

== Major results ==
2004
1st Stage 3 Giro del Friuli-Venezia Giulia
2nd Grand Prix Kooperativa
3rd Overall Tour de Hongrie

1st Stage 1

3rd Grand Prix Bradlo
2005
1st Road race, National Road Championships
1st Overall Grand Prix Cycliste de Gemenc

1st Prologue & Stage 2

1st Overall Okolo Slovenska
1st Overall Tour of Bulgaria

1st Stage 1

2nd Overall Tour of Turkey
2nd Overall Tour de Hongrie
2006
1st Overall Grand Prix Cycliste de Gemenc

1st Prologue & Stage 2

1st Overall Tour de Guadeloupe
2008
3rd Road race, National Road Championships
2009
1st Stage 3 Tour of Bulgaria
