= Peter Velits =

Slovak road bicycle racer

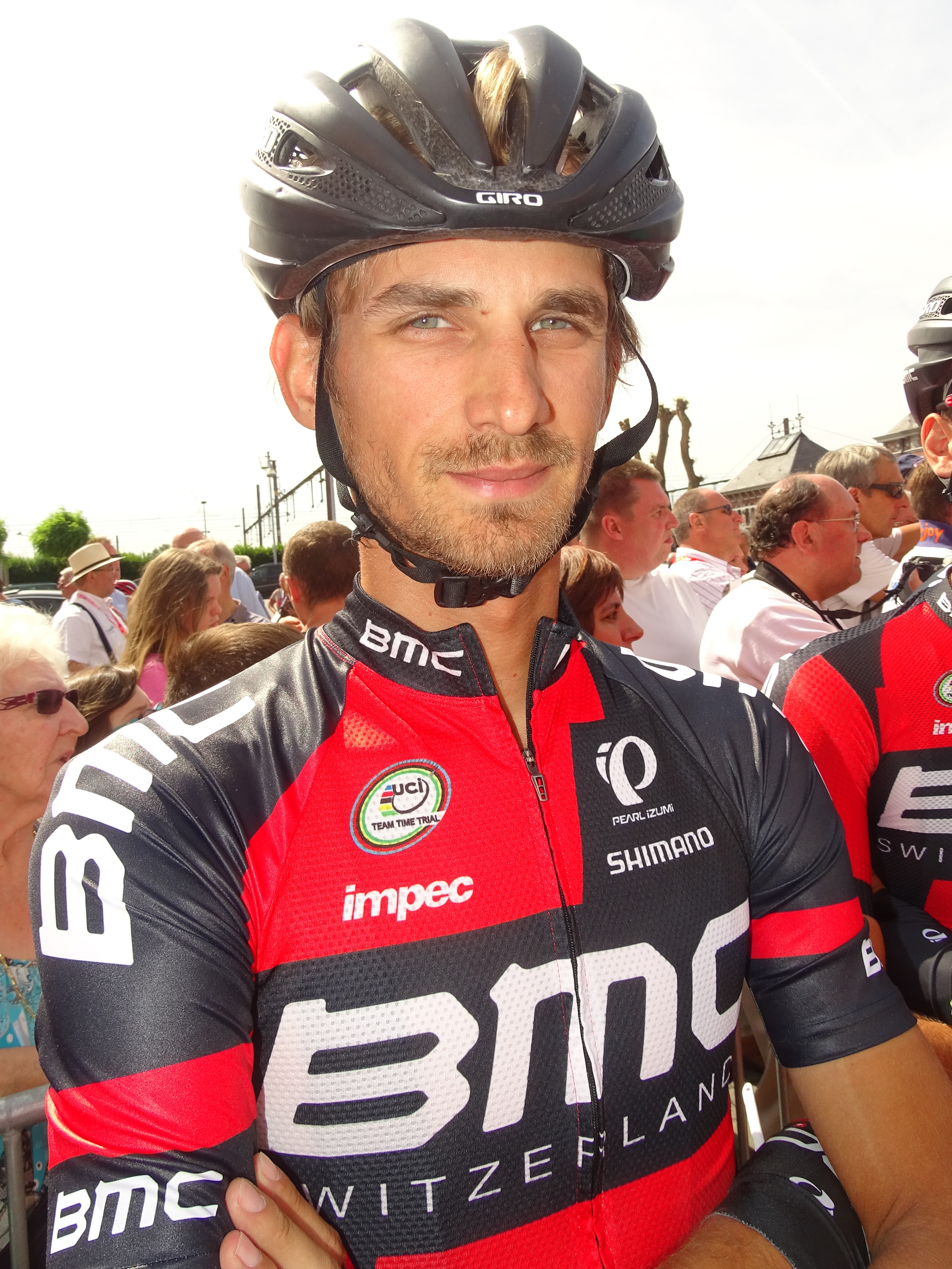
- Velits at the 2015 Grand Prix Pino Cerami

Personal information
- Born: 21 February 1985 (age 41) Bratislava, Czechoslovakia
- Height: 1.81 m (5 ft 11 in)
- Weight: 65 kg (143 lb; 10.2 st)

Cycling career
- Sport: Cycling
- Current team: Retired
- Discipline: Road
- Role: Rider
- Rider type: All-rounder

Amateur teams
- 2004: Dukla Trenčín
- 2005–2006: Team Konica Minolta

Professional teams
- 2007: Wiesenhof–Felt
- 2008–2009: Team Milram
- 2010–2011: Team HTC–Columbia
- 2012–2013: Omega Pharma–Quick-Step
- 2014–2016: BMC Racing Team

Major wins
- Grand Tours Vuelta a España 1 individual stage (2010) 2 TTT stages (2010, 2015) Stage races Tour of Oman (2012) One-day races and Classics National Time Trial Championships (2012, 2013, 2014) GP de Fourmies (2007)
Medal record
Men's road bicycle racing
Representing Slovakia
World Championships
Gold medal – first place	2007 Stuttgart	Under-23 road race
Representing Omega Pharma–Quick-Step
World Championships
Gold medal – first place	2012 Valkenburg	Team time trial
Gold medal – first place	2013 Florence	Team time trial
Representing BMC Racing Team
World Championships
Gold medal – first place	2014 Ponferrada	Team time trial

Peter Velits (born 21 February 1985) is a Slovak former professional road racing cyclist. His career highlights included third place overall and a stage win at the 2010 Vuelta a España, the 2007 World Under-23 Road Race Championships gold and the 2012 Tour of Oman overall victory. Velits was also known as strong time-trialist, winning three consecutive team time trials as a part of Omega Pharma–Quick-Step in 2012 and 2013 and riding on the BMC Racing Team in 2014 UCI Road World Championships. His twin brother, Martin Velits also competed professionally, having raced on the same teams every year until the end of the 2013 season.

After two seasons with the team, Velits left Omega Pharma–Quick-Step at the end of the 2013 season to join the BMC Racing Team. He remained with the team until he retired at the end of the 2016 season.

== Post-cycling career ==
Following his retirement from professional cycling in 2016, Velits co-founded Isadore Apparel, a sustainable cycling clothing brand based in Púchov, Slovakia, together with his twin brother Martin Velits. The brand was established in 2013 while Velits was still competing professionally, with Peter managing operations alongside his racing career before dedicating himself to the company full-time upon retirement. Isadore produces cycling apparel using sustainable materials including merino wool, with manufacturing based in Europe under OEKO-TEX and bluesign standards.

== Major results ==
2003
National Junior Road Championships

1st Road race
1st Time trial

2004
7th Overall Tour d'Egypte
10th Overall UAE Emirates Post Tour
10th Grand Prix Bradlo
2005
1st Time trial, National Under-23 Road Championships
1st Stage 6 Vuelta a Navarra
3rd Overall Giro delle Regioni
6th Overall Ringerike GP
2006
1st Time trial, National Under-23 Road Championships
1st Overall Giro del Capo

1st Stage 2

1st Grand Prix Kooperativa
2nd Overall Grand Prix Guillaume Tell

1st Stage 2

4th Overall Tour de Bretagne
4th Grote Prijs Stad Zottegem
5th Overall Tour de la Somme
9th Overall Tour of Japan
2007
1st Road race, UCI Under-23 Road World Championships
1st Grand Prix de Fourmies
3rd GP Triberg-Schwarzwald
9th Overall Bayern Rundfahrt

1st Young rider classification

9th Overall Giro del Capo
2008
Combativity award Stage 17 Tour de France
2009
1st Grand Prix of Aargau Canton
3rd Clásica de San Sebastián
5th Gran Premio di Lugano
6th Prague–Karlovy Vary–Prague
7th Monte Paschi Strade Bianche
8th GP Triberg-Schwarzwald
10th Milan–San Remo
2010
3rd Overall Vuelta a España

1st Stages 1 (TTT) & 17 (ITT)

10th Overall Volta ao Algarve
2012
1st Team time trial, UCI Road World Championships
National Road Championships

1st Time trial
2nd Road race

1st Overall Tour of Oman
2013
1st Team time trial, UCI Road World Championships
1st Time trial, National Road Championships
10th Overall Paris–Nice
2014
1st Team time trial, UCI Road World Championships
National Road Championships

1st Time trial
2nd Road race

9th Overall Dubai Tour
9th Overall Paris–Nice
2015
Vuelta a España

1st Stage 1 (TTT)
Held after Stage 1

=== Grand Tour general classification results timeline ===
Grand Tour	2008	2009	2010	2011	2012	2013	2014	2015
Giro d'Italia	Did not contest during career							
Tour de France	56	30	—	18	27	25	27	—
Vuelta a España	—	—	3	—	—	—	—	DNF

Did not finish = DNF
