= Nico Denz =

German cyclist (born 1994)

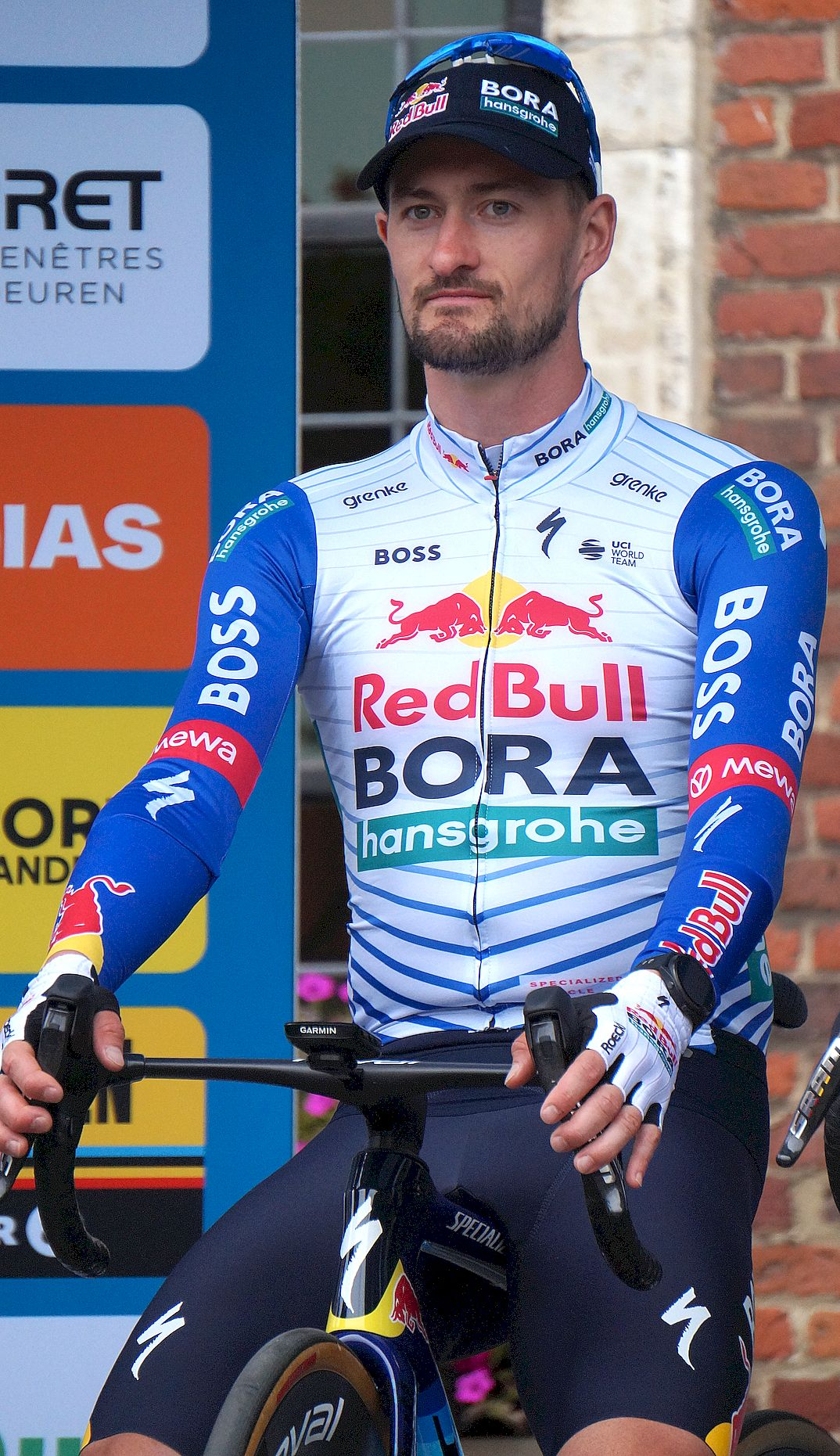
- Denz in 2026

Personal information
- Born: 15 February 1994 (age 32) Waldshut-Tiengen, Germany
- Height: 1.83 m (6 ft 0 in)
- Weight: 71 kg (157 lb; 11.2 st)

Cycling career
- Sport: Cycling
- Current team: Red Bull–Bora–Hansgrohe
- Discipline: Road
- Role: Rider

Amateur team
- 2013–2015: Chambéry CF

Professional teams
- 2014: Ag2r–La Mondiale (stagiaire)
- 2015–2019: AG2R La Mondiale
- 2020–2022: Team Sunweb
- 2023–: Bora–Hansgrohe

Major wins
- Grand Tours Giro d'Italia 3 individual stages (2023, 2025)

Nico Denz (born 15 February 1994) is a German professional racing cyclist, who currently rides for UCI WorldTeam Red Bull–Bora–Hansgrohe. He competed in the 2017 Vuelta a España, his first Grand Tour. In May 2018, he competed in the 2018 Giro d'Italia, and has entered the race each year since.

== Major results ==
2011
3rd Road race, National Junior Road Championships
2015
3rd Road race, National Under-23 Road Championships
7th Overall Tour des Pays de Savoie
8th Tour de Berne
2016
4th Cholet-Pays de Loire
2017
1st Mountains classification, Étoile de Bessèges
2018 (1 pro win)
1st Tour de Vendée
8th Le Samyn
9th Road race, UEC European Road Championships
2020 (1)
2nd Overall Okolo Slovenska

1st Stage 2

2022 (1)
1st Stage 6 Tour de Suisse
2023 (3)
Giro d'Italia

1st Stages 12 & 14

1st Stage 5 Tour of Turkey
2nd Road race, National Road Championships
2025 (1)
1st Stage 18 Giro d'Italia
5th Time trial, National Road Championships
9th Eschborn–Frankfurt
2026
1st (TTT) Trofeo Ses Salines

=== Grand Tour general classification results timeline ===
Grand Tour	2017	2018	2019	2020	2021	2022	2023	2024
Giro d'Italia	—	62	124	83	102	111	57	—
Tour de France	—	—	—	—	—	—	—	110
Vuelta a España	DNF	—	—	—	114	—	97	DNF

Legend
—	Did not compete
DNF	Did not finish
IP	In progress
