= Erik Baška =

Slovak road racing cyclist

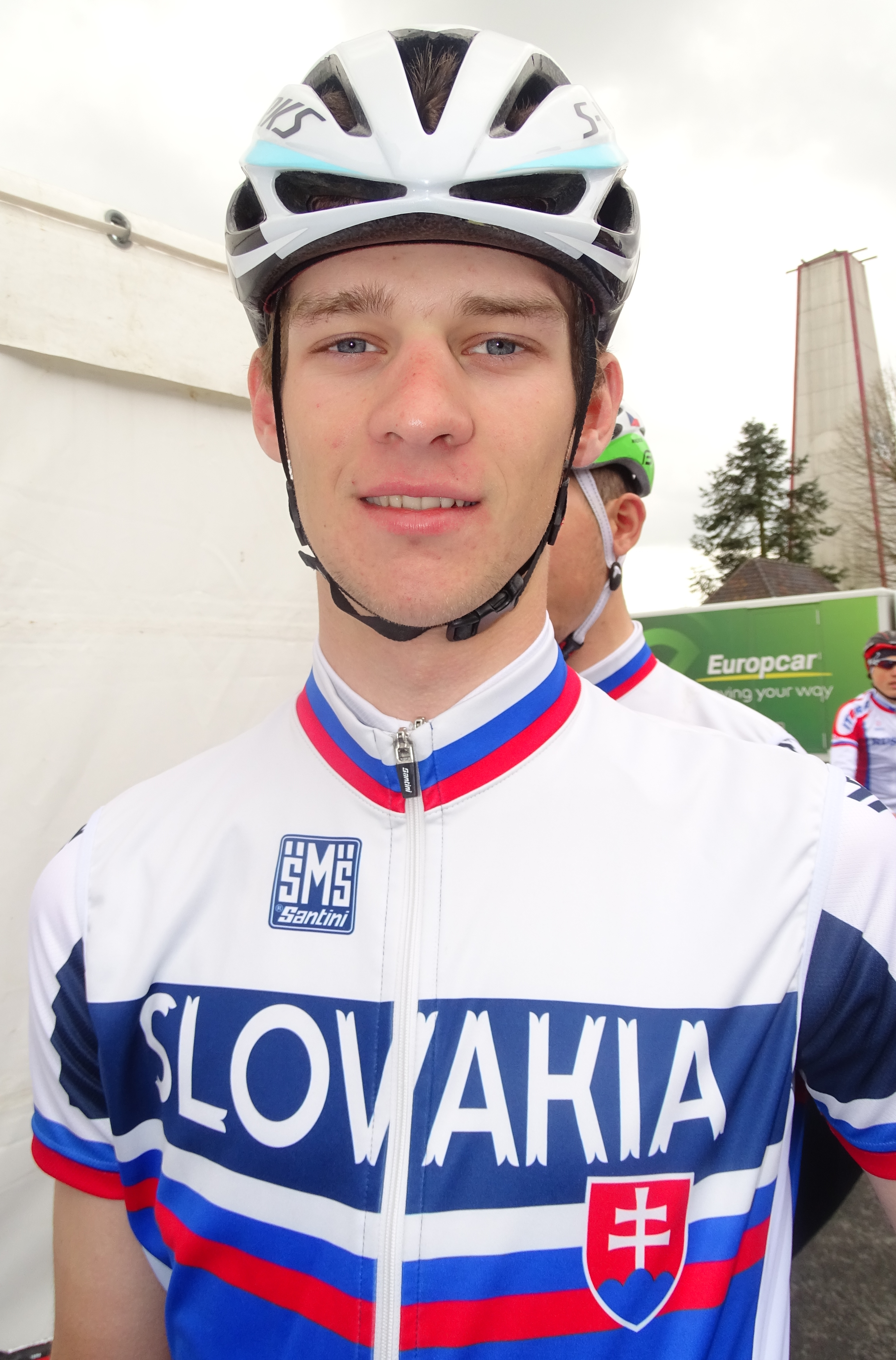
- Baška at the 2015 Ronde van Vlaanderen U23

Personal information
- Full name: Erik Baška
- Born: 12 January 1994 (age 32) Dohňany, Slovakia
- Height: 1.82 m (6 ft 0 in)
- Weight: 74 kg (163 lb)

Cycling career
- Sport: Cycling
- Current team: Retired
- Discipline: Road
- Role: Rider

Amateur teams
- 2013–2014: Dukla Trenčín–Trek
- 2015: AWT–GreenWay

Professional teams
- 2016: Tinkoff
- 2017–2021: Bora–Hansgrohe
- 2022: Dukla Banská Bystrica
Medal record
Men's road bicycle racing
Representing Slovakia
European Road Championships
Gold medal – first place	2015 Tartu	Under-23 road race

Erik Baška (born 12 January 1994) is a Slovak former road racing cyclist, who competed as a professional from 2013 to 2022. He took up cycle racing at the age of 14, initially competing as a mountain biker before branching into road racing at the suggestion of his coach Tibor Velits, uncle of racing cyclists Martin Velits and Peter Velits.

== Major results ==
2013
1st Time trial, National Under-23 Road Championships
5th Overall Carpathian Couriers Race

1st Points classification
1st Combativity classification

2014
1st Visegrad 4 Bicycle Race – GP Polski
1st Central European Tour Košice–Miskolc
1st Central European Tour Budapest GP
3rd Road race, National Under-23 Road Championships
3rd Puchar Ministra Obrony Narodowej
6th Central European Tour Szerencs–Ibrány
2015
1st Road race, UEC European Under-23 Road Championships
1st Time trial, National Under-23 Road Championships
1st Puchar Ministra Obrony Narodowej
1st Stage 4 Carpathian Couriers Race
1st Stage 3 Tour de Berlin
2nd Poreč Trophy
2nd Visegrad 4 Bicycle Race – GP Slovakia
2016
1st Handzame Classic
1st Stage 5 (TTT) Tour of Croatia
2017
3rd Road race, National Road Championships
2018
1st Stage 1 (TTT) Czech Cycling Tour
2nd Trofeo Palma
8th Trofeo Campos, Porreres, Felanitx, Ses Salines
2019
2nd Road race, National Road Championships
9th Overall Okolo Slovenska
2020
2nd Road race, National Road Championships
