= Ján Andrej Cully =

Slovak cyclist (born 1995)

Personal information
- Full name: Ján Andrej Cully
- Born: 9 December 1995 (age 30)

Cycling career
- Sport: Cycling
- Current team: Retired
- Discipline: Road
- Role: Rider

Amateur team
- 2016: Dukla Banská Bystrica (stagiaire)

Professional team
- 2017–2021: Dukla Banská Bystrica

Major wins
- One-day races and Classics National Time Trial Championships (2019, 2020)

Ján Andrej Cully (born 9 December 1995) is a Slovak former professional racing cyclist. He rode for Dukla Banská Bystrica in the men's team time trial event at the 2018 UCI Road World Championships.

== Major results ==
2017
2nd Overall Grand Prix Chantal Biya

1st Young rider classification
1st Stage 1

2018
4th Time trial, National Road Championships
4th Overall Grand Prix Chantal Biya
7th Overall Tour du Cameroun
2019
1st Time trial, National Road Championships
1st Stage 4 Tour de Serbie
5th Overall In The Steps of Romans

1st Stage 2

9th Grand Prix Velo Erciyes
10th GP Slovakia
2020
1st Time trial, National Road Championships
4th Overall In the footsteps of the Romans
