= 2007 UCI Road World Championships – Men's under-23 road race =

Cycling road race

The 2007 UCI Road World Championships - Men's Under-23 Road Race took place on September 29, 2007 in the German city of Stuttgart. The race was won by Peter Velits of Slovakia who won in a bunch sprint of around 40 riders. Wesley Sulzberger took second with Jonathan Bellis of Great Britain taking the bronze medal. Pre-race favorite Edvald Boasson Hagen was involved in a crash around ten metres from the finish line, officially finishing 56th 27 seconds back.

== Results ==
September 29, 2007: Stuttgart, 171.9 km

	Cyclist	Time
1	(Slovakia) Peter Velits (SVK)	4:21:22
2	(Australia) Wesley Sulzberger (AUS)	s.t.
3	(United Kingdom) Jonathan Bellis (GBR)	s.t.
4	(Netherlands) Tom Leezer (NED)	s.t.
5	(Switzerland) Danilo Wyss (SUI)	s.t.
6	(Denmark) Jonas Aaen Jørgensen (DEN)	s.t.
7	(Germany) Domenik Klemme (GER)	s.t.
8	(France) Florian Vachon (FRA)	s.t.
9	(Ukraine) Vitaliy Buts (UKR)	s.t.
10	(Kazakhstan) Andrey Zeits (KAZ)	s.t.
