= Jakub Novák (Slovak cyclist) =

Slovak cyclist

Personal information
- Full name: Jakub Novák
- Born: 23 March 1988 (age 38): Prešov, Czechoslovakia; (now Slovakia)

Cycling career
- Sport: Cycling
- Current team: Retired
- Discipline: Road
- Role: Rider

Professional teams
- 2010: Amore & Vita–Conad
- 2011: Dukla Trenčín–Merida

Jakub Novák (born 23 March 1988 in Prešov) is a Slovak former professional cyclist.

== Major results ==
2006
1st Time trial, National Junior Road Championships
2007
2nd Time trial, National Under-23 Road Championships
2009
1st Time trial, National Under-23 Road Championships
2010
1st Road race, National Road Championships
