= Patrik Tybor =

Slovak bicycle racer (born 1987)

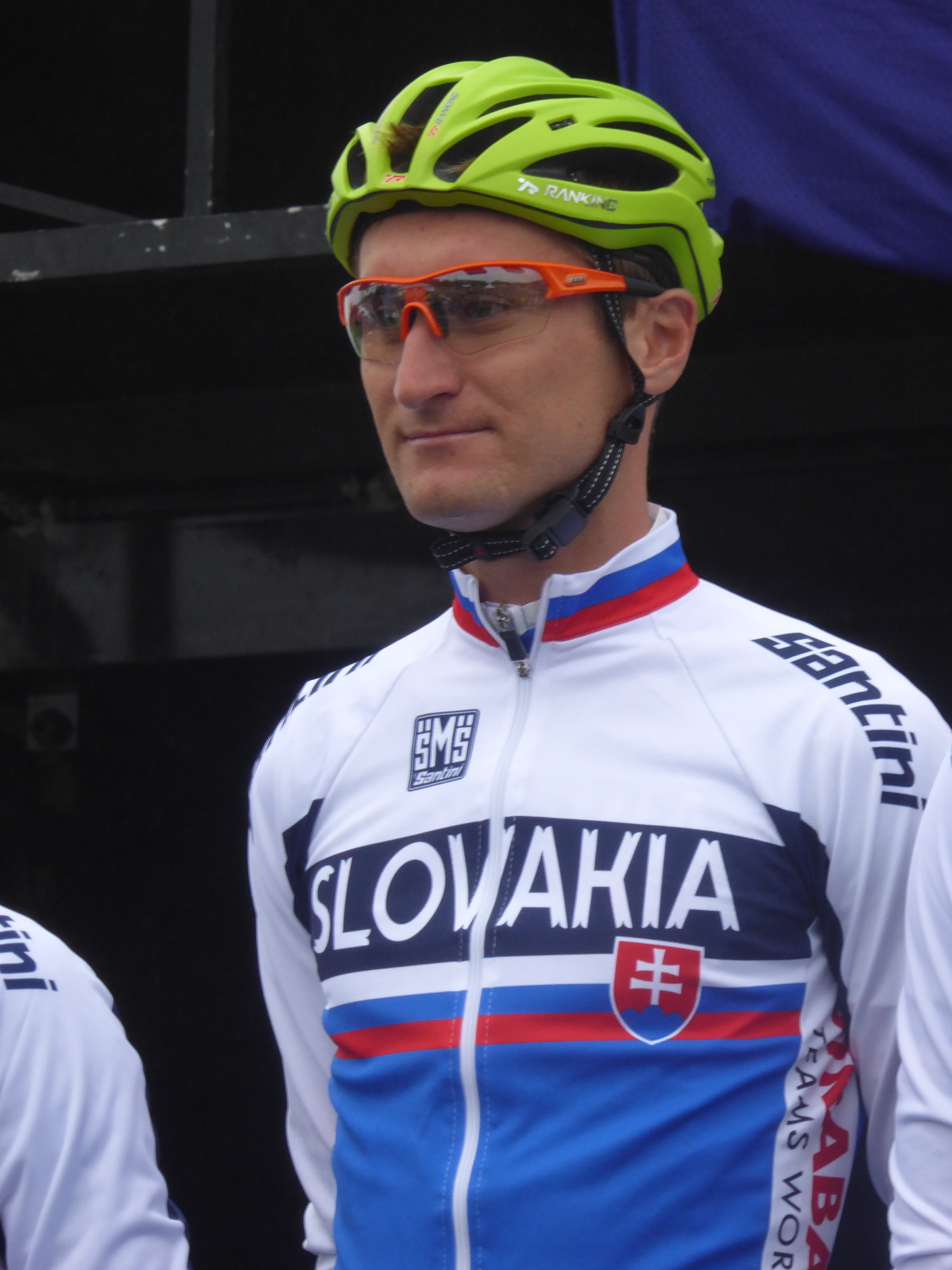
- Tybor at the 2018 European Road Cycling Championships

Personal information
- Born: 16 September 1987 (age 39): Dubnica nad Váhom, Czechoslovakia; (now Slovakia)
- Height: 1.86 m (6 ft 1 in)

Cycling career
- Sport: Cycling
- Current team: Dukla Banská Bystrica
- Discipline: Road
- Role: Rider (retired); Directeur sportif

Professional team
- 2006–2023: Dukla Trenčín

Managerial team
- 2024–: Dukla Banská Bystrica

Patrik Tybor (born 16 September 1987) is a Slovak former cyclist, who competed between 2006 and 2023, entirely for UCI Continental team Dukla Banská Bystrica. He participated in the individual road race event in the 2016 Summer Olympics in Rio de Janeiro and finished forty-fifth. He now works as a directeur sportif for Dukla Banská Bystrica.

== Major results ==
2007
4th Puchar Ministra Obrony Narodowej
5th Overall Tour d'Egypte
6th Overall Grand Prix Cycliste de Gemenc
9th GP Palma
10th Memoriał Henryka Łasaka
2008
10th Memoriał Henryka Łasaka
2009
1st Stage 2 Grand Prix Bradlo
2nd Time trial, National Under-23 Road Championships
2011
2nd GP Betonexpressz 2000
10th Road race, Summer Universiade
2012
3rd Road race, National Road Championships
7th Tour Bohemia
2013
1st Stage 4 Baltic Chain Tour
3rd Road race, National Road Championships
3rd Overall Tour de Serbie
6th Tour Bohemia
9th GP Kranj
2014
Visegrad 4 Bicycle Race

2nd GP Slovakia
5th GP Czech Republic

3rd Time trial, National Road Championships
2015
National Road Championships

3rd Road race
3rd Time trial

3rd Overall Tour of Bulgaria

1st Points classification
1st Stages 1 & 3

4th Overall Tour de Hongrie
6th Rund um Sebnitz
8th Memoriał Andrzeja Trochanowskiego
9th Overall Okolo Slovenska

1st Slovak rider classification

9th Korona Kocich Gór
10th GP Hungary, Visegrad 4 Bicycle Race
2016
1st Stage 6 Tour du Cameroun
2nd Overall Tour du Maroc

1st Stage 5

4th Kerékpárverseny, Visegrad 4 Bicycle Race
7th Overall Sharjah International Cycling Tour
2017
National Road Championships

2nd Time trial
5th Road race

4th Overall Grand Prix Cycliste de Gemenc
4th GP Czech Republic, Visegrad 4 Bicycle Race
5th Overall Tour du Cameroun
7th Overall Okolo Slovenska
8th Overall Tour de Hongrie
2018
2nd Time trial, National Road Championships
6th Debrecen–Ibrany, V4 Special Series
2019
2nd Grand Prix Velo Erciyes
2nd Puchar Uzdrowisk Karpackich
National Road Championships

3rd Road race
3rd Time trial

V4 Special Series

5th Vasarosnameny–Nyiregyhaza
6th Debrecen–Ibrany
