= Samuel Oros =

Slovak cyclist

Personal information
- Full name: Samuel Oros
- Born: 15 April 1998 (age 28)

Cycling career
- Sport: Cycling
- Discipline: Road
- Role: Rider

Amateur teams
- 2020: Cycling Academy Trenčín
- 2022: BRS Technology–Kartus Bike RT

Professional teams
- 2017–2019: Dukla Banská Bystrica
- 2021: Cycling Academy Trenčín

Samuel Oros (born 15 April 1998) is a Slovak racing cyclist, who last rode for amateur team BRS Technology–Kartus Bike RT. He rode for Dukla Banská Bystrica in the men's team time trial event at the 2018 UCI Road World Championships.

== Major results ==
2015
1st Time trial, National Junior Road Championships
2016
National Junior Road Championships

2nd Time trial
3rd Road race

2019
National Under-23 Road Championships

1st Road race
2nd Time trial

2020
1st Time trial, National Under-23 Road Championships
