= Lukáš Kubiš =

Slovak cyclist (born 2000)

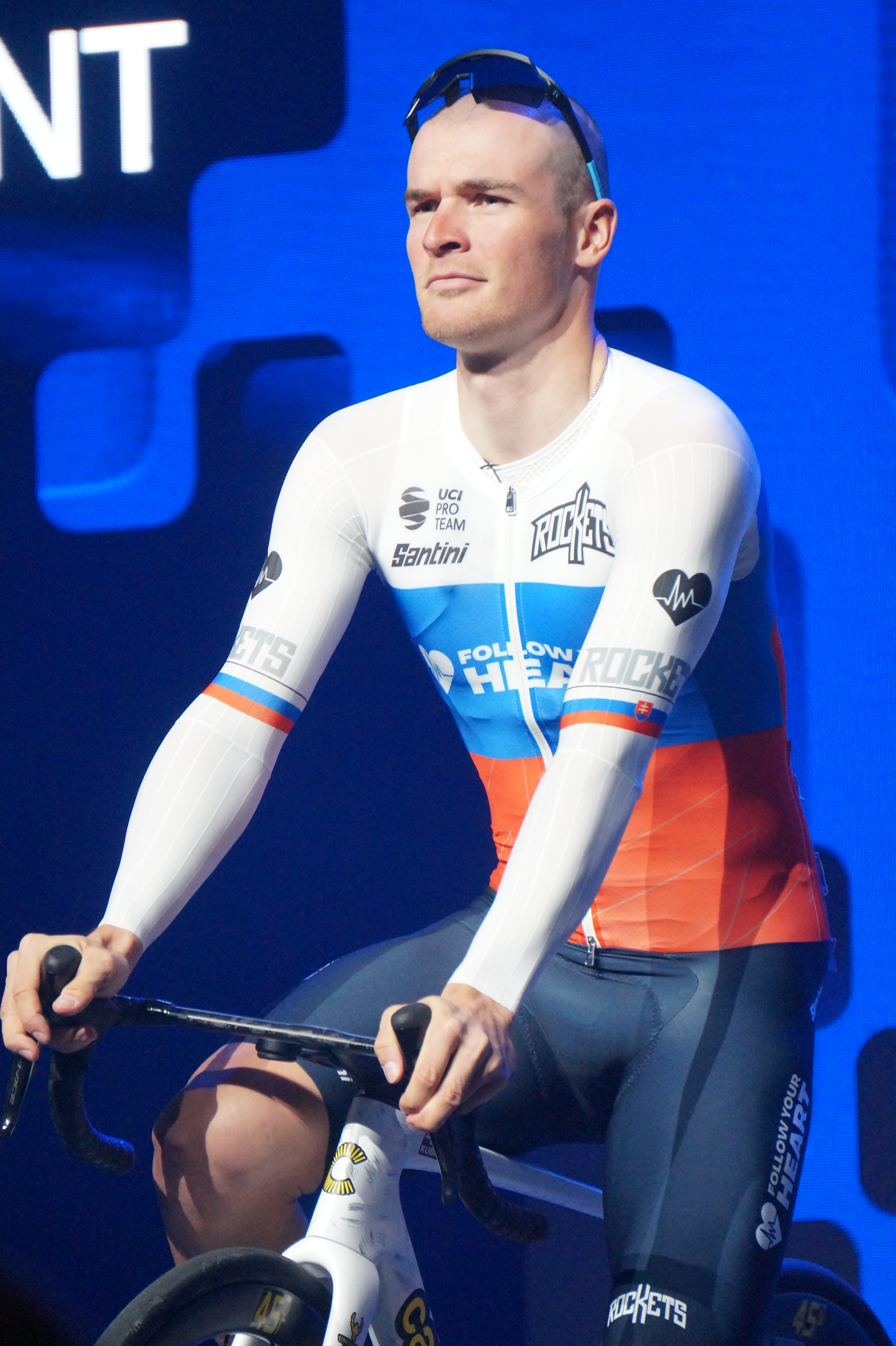
- Kubiš at the 2025 Omloop Het Nieuwsblad

Personal information
- Born: 31 January 2000 (age 26) Zvolen, Slovakia
- Height: 1.75 m (5 ft 9 in)
- Weight: 70 kg (154 lb)

Cycling career
- Sport: Cycling
- Current team: Unibet Rose Rockets
- Discipline: Road
- Role: Rider

Professional teams
- 2019–2023: Dukla Banská Bystrica
- 2024: Elkov–Kasper
- 2025–: Unibet Tietema Rockets

Major wins
- One-day races and Classics National Road Race Championships (2024, 2025, 2026) National Time Trial Championships (2024, 2026)

Lukáš Kubiš (born 31 January 2000) is a Slovak racing cyclist, who currently rides for UCI ProTeam Unibet Rose Rockets.

== Major results ==
2017
2nd Time trial, National Junior Road Championships
2018
2nd Time trial, National Junior Road Championships
2019
5th Overall Tour du Sénégal
2020
1st Road race, National Under-23 Road Championships
2nd Overall Grand Prix Chantal Biya

1st Points classification
1st Stage 3

National Road Championships

3rd Road race
5th Time trial

5th Overall Tour of Szeklerland

1st Young rider classification

2021
National Under-23 Road Championships

1st Time trial
2nd Road race

1st Overall Grand Prix Chantal Biya

1st Points classification
1st Young rider classification
1st Stages 2 & 4

National Road Championships

2nd Time trial
3rd Road race

4th GP Slovakia
6th Overall Tour of Bulgaria
9th Grand Prix Mediterrennean
2022
National Under-23 Road Championships

1st Road race
4th Time trial

2nd Road race, National Road Championships
2nd Overall Grand Prix Chantal Biya
4th Visegrad 4 Kerékpárverseny
5th Le Trophée de l'Anniversaire
6th Grand Prix Oued Eddahab
6th Le Trophée Princier
9th Grand Prix Sakia El Hamra
10th GP Slovakia
10th Fyen Rundt
10th Le Trophée de la Maison Royale
2023
1st Grand Prix du Prince Héritier Moulay el Hassan
1st Grand Prix du Trône
National Road Championships

3rd Road race
4th Time trial

3rd Overall Gemenc Grand Prix

1st Stage 2

3rd Overall In the footsteps of the Romans
4th Grand Prix de la Famille Royale
5th Overall Tour of Bulgaria
2024 (2 pro wins)
National Road Championships

1st Road race
1st Time trial

1st Kirschblütenrennen
1st GP Polski
1st Pardubické Kritérium
3rd Overall Tour of Romania

1st Stage 1

4th Poreč Trophy
7th Overall Circuit des Ardennes
8th Umag Trophy
10th GP Slovenian Istria
10th GP Adria Mobil
2025 (2)
National Road Championships

1st Road race
2nd Time trial

1st Cholet Agglo Tour
2nd Overall Tour of Holland

1st Young rider classification

3rd Paris–Chauny
4th Overall Danmark Rundt
4th Muur Classic Geraardsbergen
4th Vuelta a Castilla y León
5th Overall Tour de la Provence
5th Münsterland Giro
6th Overall Okolo Slovenska
6th Omloop Het Nieuwsblad
7th Boucles de l'Aulne
9th Kuurne–Brussels–Kuurne
9th Nokere Koerse
10th Le Samyn
2026 (2)
National Road Championships

1st Road race
1st Time trial

2nd Overall Danmark Rundt
3rd Gran Premio Castellón
4th Overall Étoile de Bessèges

1st Points classification

5th Muur Classic Geraardsbergen
5th Le Samyn
6th Nokere Koerse
7th Overall Tour of Belgium
7th Flandrien 0.0 Classic
9th Clásica Jaén Paraíso Interior
10th Trofeo Matteotti
