= Lars Saugstad =

Norwegian road cyclist

Personal information
- Born: 28 May 1997 (age 29) Ringsaker, Norway

Cycling career
- Sport: Cycling
- Current team: Retired
- Discipline: Road
- Role: Rider

Amateur teams
- 2016: Ringerike SK
- 2016: Team Ringeriks–Kraft (stagiaire)

Professional team
- 2017–2022: Uno-X Hydrogen Development Team

Lars Saugstad (born 28 May 1997) is a Norwegian former cyclist, who competed as a professional from 2017 to 2022 for UCI ProTeam Uno-X Pro Cycling Team.

== Major results ==
2018
6th Paris–Tours Espoirs
7th Overall Olympia's Tour
2019
5th Paris–Tours Espoirs
2021
6th Gylne Gutuer
