= Monika Kadlecová =

Slovak cyclist

Personal information
- Born: 27 November 1990 (age 35) Slovakia

Cycling career
- Sport: Cycling
- Discipline: Road cycling

Monika Kadlecová (born 27 November 1990) is a female road cyclist from Slovakia. She became national road race champion in 2013, and 2014.
