= In the Steps of Romans =

Race details
- Date: June/July
- Region: Bulgaria
- Local name(s): Bulgarian: По стъпките на Римляните
- Discipline: Road
- Competition: UCI Europe Tour
- Type: Stage race
- Web site: cup.doltcini.com

History
- First edition: 2019
- Editions: 6 (as of 2024)
- First winner: Polychronis Tzortzakis (GRE)
- Most wins: No repeat winners
- Most recent: Alin Toader (ROM)

In the Steps of Romans, officially In the footsteps of the Romans, is a multi-day road cycling race held annually in Bulgaria. The race has been held since 2019 as a category 2.2 event on the UCI Europe Tour.

== Winners ==
Year	Winner	Second	Third
2019	(Greece) Polychronis Tzortzakis	(Serbia) Marko Danilović	(Slovakia) Juraj Bellan
2020	(Poland) Norbert Banaszek	(Serbia) Veljko Stojnić	(Spain) Miguel Ángel Ballesteros
2021	(Germany) Immanuel Stark	(Poland) Paweł Cieślik	(Germany) Tobias Nolde
2022	(Poland) Maciej Paterski	(France) Alexis Guérin	(Hungary) Ádám Kristóf Karl
2023	(Italy) Filippo Fortin	(Poland) Patryk Stosz	(Slovakia) Lukáš Kubiš
2024	(Romania) Alin Toader	(Bulgaria) Yordan Petrov	(Denmark) Mads Schulz Jørgensen
