= Matej Jurčo =

Slovak cyclist

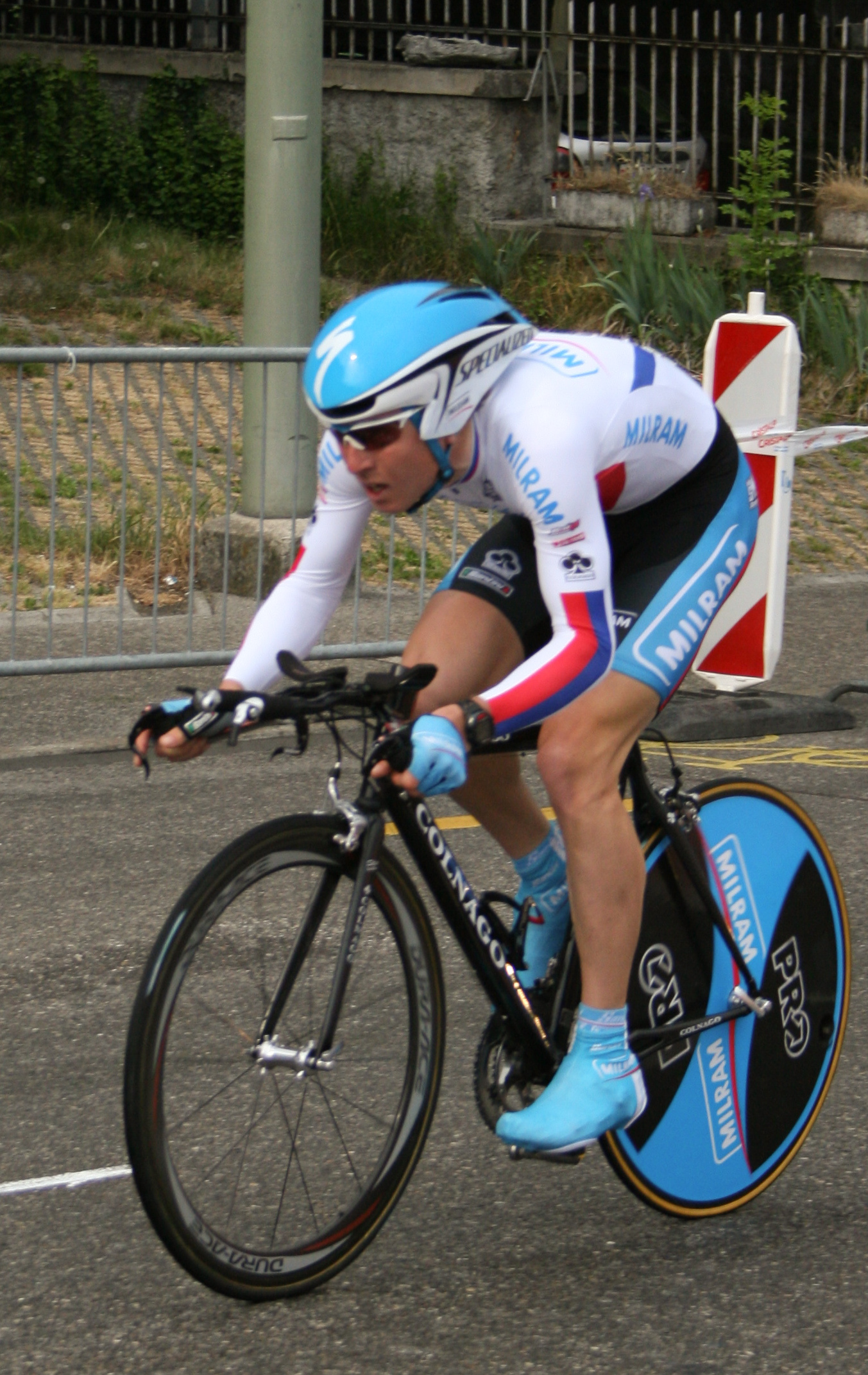
- Jurčo in 2008

Personal information
- Full name: Matej Jurčo
- Born: 8 August 1984 (age 42) Poprad, Czechoslovakia

Cycling career
- Sport: Cycling
- Current team: Retired
- Discipline: Road
- Role: Rider

Amateur teams
- 2003: Tatranské orly
- 2003: Dukla Trenčín
- 2003: De Nardi–Colpack (stagiaire)
- 2009: Tatranské orly

Professional teams
- 2004–2005: De Nardi–Piemme Telekom
- 2006–2008: Team Milram
- 2010–2011: Dukla Trenčín–Merida
- 2012: Whirlpool–Author
- 2013–2015: Dukla Trenčín–Trek
Medal record
Men's cycling
Representing Slovakia
European Youth Summer Olympic Festival
Bronze medal – third place	1999 Esbjerg	Boys' road race

Matej Jurčo (born 8 August 1984) is a Slovak former professional road bicycle racer, who competed professionally between 2004 and 2015. He is the son of Milan Jurčo, who was also a professional cyclist.

Matej Jurčo was a multinational champion in the individual time trial, as well as a national champion in the road race in 2008.

== Major results ==
1999
3rd Road race, European Youth Olympic Games
2002
1st La Coupe du Président de la Ville de Grudziądz
1st Oberosterreich-Junioren-Rundfahrt
1st UCI Juniors World Challenge
1st Kroz Istru
2nd Overall Tour de Taiwan
2nd Overall Grand Prix Général Patton
3rd Overall Grand Prix Rüebliland
4th Overall Giro di Basilicata
5th Road race, UCI Junior World Road Championships
2003
1st Time trial, World Military Championships
1st Overall GP Lidice
1st Stage 5 Tour d'Egypte
1st Stage 1 Tour of Slovakia
2nd Overall Tour de Hongrie

1st Prologue & Stage 6

2nd GP Bradlo
5th GP Pribram
6th GP ZTS Dubnica
9th Overall Ytong Bohemia Tour
2004
National Road Championships

1st Time trial
2nd Road race

3rd Overall UNIQA Classic
2005
1st Time trial, National Road Championships
2006
1st Time trial, National Road Championships
2008
National Road Championships

1st Road race
1st Time trial

2009
2nd Overall Grand Prix de Gemenc
3rd Overall GP Bradlo
2010
1st Stage 4 Vuelta del Uruguay
2011
2nd Road race, National Road Championships
2nd Banja Luka–Beograd II
3rd Puchar Ministra Obrony Narodowej
4th Overall Dookoła Mazowsza

1st Stage 1

6th Duo Normand (with Pavol Polievka)
8th Overall Tour du Maroc
8th Overall Tour of Małopolska
8th Challenges Phosphatiers I
2012
Czech Cycling Tour

1st Stages 1 (TTT) & 4

3rd Time trial, National Road Championships
4th Grand Prix Královéhradeckého kraje
7th Overall Tour of Małopolska
2013
2nd GP Kranj
4th Košice–Miskolc
5th Road race, World Military Championships
5th Overall Tour du Maroc
5th Mayor Cup
10th Central European Tour Budapest GP
2014
7th GP Hungary
