= Slovak National Road Race Championships =

National road cycling championship in Slovakia

The Jersey for Slovak Champion

The Slovakia National Road Race Championships take place annually and decide the national champion for the year in various categories. The winner of the championship gains the right to wear a distinctive jersey with a Slovak flag during races.

== Men ==
=== Multiple winners ===
Wins	Name	Years
8	Peter Sagan	2011, 2012, 2013, 2014, 2015, 2018, 2021, 2022
5	Ján Valach	1995, 1997, 1998, 1999, 2001
5	Martin Riška	1996, 2002, 2003, 2004, 2007
4	Juraj Sagan	2016, 2017, 2019, 2020
3	Lukáš Kubiš	2024, 2025, 2026

=== Elite ===
This section contains the list of Slovak road race champions. Since the year 2000, the Slovak championships were combined with the national championships of the Czech Republic. The column Overall winner shows the winner of the joint championship

Year	Gold	Silver	Bronze
1996	Martin Riška	Milan Dvorščík	Ján Valach
1997	Ján Valach	Miroslav Lipták	Pavel Zaduban
1998	Ján Valach (2)	Ján Šipeky	Miroslav Lipták
1999	Ján Valach (3)	Miroslav Lipták	Martin Riška
2000	Róbert Nagy	Roman Broniš	Ondrej Slobodník
2001	Ján Valach (4)	Ľuboš Kondis	Roman Broniš
2002	Martin Riška (2)	Róbert Nagy	Miroslav Keliar
2003	Martin Riška (3)	Robert Glovniak	Roman Broniš
2004	Martin Riška (4)	Matej Jurčo	Miroslav Keliar
2005	Martin Prázdnovský	Ondrej Slobodník	Roman Broniš
2006	Maroš Kováč	Zoltán Remák	Martin Riška
2007	Martin Riška (5)	Ján Valach	Maroš Kováč
2008	Matej Jurčo	Roman Broniš	Martin Prázdnovský
2009	Martin Velits	Ján Valach	Matej Jurčo
2010	Jakub Novák	Matej Vyšňa	Martin Kostelničák
2011	Peter Sagan	Matej Jurčo	Marek Čanecký
2012	Peter Sagan (2)	Peter Velits	Patrik Tybor
2013	Peter Sagan (3)	Maroš Kováč	Patrik Tybor
2014	Peter Sagan (4)	Peter Velits	Martin Mahďar
2015	Peter Sagan (5)	Juraj Sagan	Patrik Tybor
2016	Juraj Sagan	Peter Sagan	Michael Kolář
2017	Juraj Sagan (2)	Peter Sagan	Erik Baška
2018	Peter Sagan (6)	Juraj Sagan	Michael Kolář
2019	Juraj Sagan (3)	Erik Baška	Patrik Tybor
2020	Juraj Sagan (4)	Erik Baška	Lukáš Kubiš
2021	Peter Sagan (7)	Matúš Štoček	Lukáš Kubiš
2022	Peter Sagan (8)	Lukáš Kubiš	Matúš Štoček
2023	Matúš Štoček	Peter Sagan	Lukáš Kubiš
2024	Lukáš Kubiš	Martin Svrček	Richard Riška
2025	Lukáš Kubiš (2)	Martin Svrček	Matthias Schwarzbacher
2026	Lukáš Kubiš (3)	Richard Riška	Samuel Novák

=== U23 ===
Year	Winner
2003	Pavol Juráš
2004	Marien Hecl
2005	Martin Velits
2006	Martin Velits
2007	Ivan Viglaský
2008	Martin Kostelničák
2009	Matej Vyšňa
2010	Jakub Novák
2011	Martin Mahďar
2012	Michal Habera
2013	Erik Baška
2014	Ľuboš Malovec
2015	Erik Baška
2016	Ľuboš Malovec
2017	Juraj Bellan
2018	Matúš Štoček
2019	Samuel Oros
2020	Lukáš Kubiš
2021	Tobias Vančo
2022	Lukáš Kubiš
2023	Simon Gottstein

== Women ==
=== Elite ===
Year	Gold	Silver	Bronze
2013	Monika Kadlecová	Lívia Hanesová	Andrea Juhásová
2014	Monika Kadlecová	Ľubica Ďaďová	Alžbeta Pavlendová
2015	Alžbeta Pavlendová	Tereza Medveďová	Lívia Hanesová
2016	Janka Keseg Števková	Lívia Hanesová	Tereza Medveďová
2017	Alžbeta Pavlendová	Janka Keseg Števková	Tereza Medveďová
2018	Tereza Medveďová	Tatiana Jaseková	Alžbeta Bačíková
2019	Alžbeta Bačíková	Tereza Medveďová	Monika Kadlecová
2020	Tereza Medveďová	Janka Keseg Števková	Radka Paulechová
2021	Tereza Medveďová	Radka Paulechová	Nora Jenčušová
2022	Nora Jenčušová	Barbora Švrcková	Tereza Medveďová
2023	Nora Jenčušová	Rebeka Cully	Tereza Medveďová
