= Martin Riška =

Slovak cyclist

Personal information
- Full name: Martin Riška
- Born: 18 May 1975 (age 51): Žilina, Czechoslovakia; (now Slovakia)

Cycling career
- Sport: Cycling
- Current team: CK Epic Dohňany - Coaching
- Discipline: Road
- Role: Coach

Professional teams
- 1999: De Nardi–Pasta Montegrappa
- 2001–2006: PSK–Remerx
- 2007: Swiag
- 2008–2011: RC Arbö–Wels–Gourmetfein

Martin Riška (born 18 May 1975 in Žilina) is a Slovak former racing cyclist. He competed at the 2000 Summer Olympics and the 2004 Summer Olympics.

== Major results ==
1996
1st Road race, National Road Championships
2002
1st GP ZTS Dubnica nad Váhom
National Road Championships

1st Road race
2nd Time trial

1st Stage 4 Paths of King Nikola
2003
1st Road race, National Road Championships
1st Stage 2 Paths of King Nikola
2004
1st Road race, National Road Championships
1st Stage 2 Okolo Slovenska
2005
1st Grand Prix Bradlo
2nd Overall Okolo Slovenska

1st Stage 1

2006
1st Overall Tour de Hongrie

1st Stages 1 & 3

1st Stage 2 Istrian Spring Trophy
1st Stage 1 Tour of Greece
National Road Championships

3rd Road race
3rd Time trial

2007
1st Road race, National Road Championships
Bałtyk–Karkonosze Tour

1st Stages 1 & 8

1st Stage 5 Tour de Hongrie
2nd Völkermarkter Radsporttage
2008
1st GP Vorarlberg
1st Stage 2 Tour de Hongrie
2009
2nd Raiffeisen Grand Prix
