= Matúš Štoček =

Slovak cyclist (born 1999)

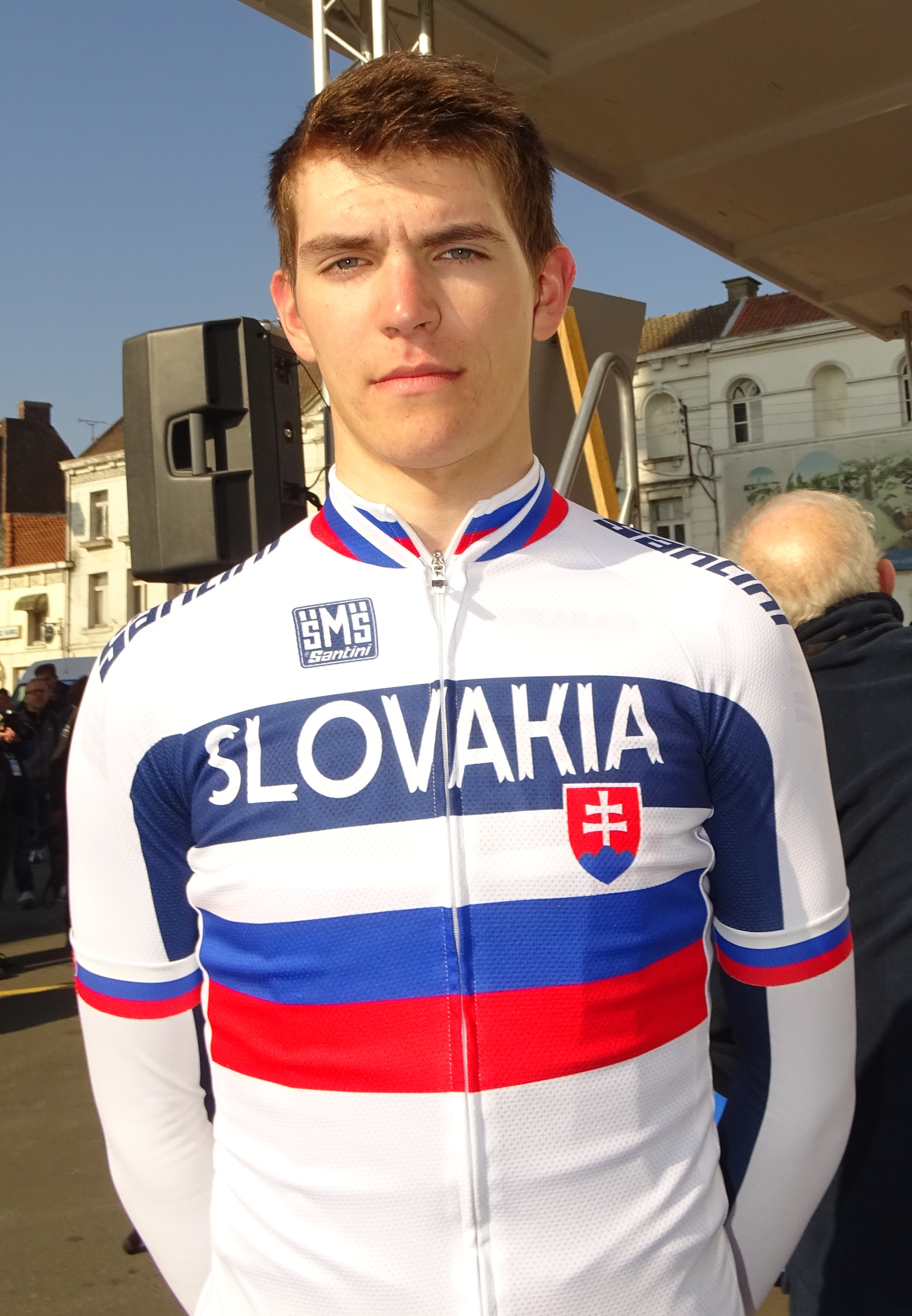
- Štoček at the 2017 Paris–Roubaix Juniors

Personal information
- Born: 12 March 1999 (age 27) Veľké Rovné, Slovakia
- Height: 1.93 m (6 ft 4 in)
- Weight: 80 kg (176 lb)

Cycling career
- Sport: Cycling
- Current team: Retired
- Discipline: Road
- Role: Rider

Amateur teams
- 2017: CyS–Akadémia Petra Sagana
- 2018: Petroli Firenze Hoppla Maserati

Professional teams
- 2019–2020: Team Beltrami TSA–Hopplà–Petroli Firenze
- 2021–2024: Topforex–ATT Investments
- 2025–2026: Elkov–Kasper

Major wins
- One-day races and Classics National Road Race Championships (2023) National Time Trial Championships (2023)

Matúš Štoček (born 12 March 1999) is a Slovak former professional racing cyclist.

== Major results ==
2015
2nd Road race, European Youth Summer Olympic Festival
2016
National Junior Road Championships

1st Road race
1st Time trial

1st Mountains classification, Trophée Centre Morbihan
1st Young rider classification, Tour du Pays de Vaud
8th Overall Trofeo Karlsberg

1st Stage 3

2017
National Junior Road Championships

1st Road race
1st Time trial

5th Gent–Wevelgem Juniors
2018
1st Points race, National Track Championships
National Under-23 Road Championships

1st Road race
1st Time trial

National Road Championships

4th Road race
5th Time trial

2019
National Under-23 Road Championships

4th Road race
4th Time trial

2021
2nd Road race, National Road Championships
9th Overall Tour du Pays de Montbéliard

1st Points classification

10th GP Slovakia
2022
3rd Road race, National Road Championships
3rd Overall Course de Solidarność et des Champions Olympiques
3rd Memorial Philippe Van Coningsloo
4th GP Slovakia
8th Overall Gemenc Grand Prix
2023
National Road Championships

1st Road race
1st Time trial

1st Points classification, Tour de Hongrie
4th Rhodes GP
5th GP Slovakia
7th Overall Gemenc Grand Prix
8th Overall Tour of Estonia
9th Overall Course de Solidarność et des Champions Olympiques
2024
4th Time trial, National Road Championships
8th Ronde van Overijssel
2025
4th Road race, National Road Championships
7th Silesian Beskid Race
