= Maroš Kováč =

Slovakian road bicycle racer

Personal information
- Full name: Maroš Kováč
- Born: 11 April 1977 (age 49): Košice, Czechoslovakia; (now Slovakia)

Cycling career
- Sport: Cycling
- Current team: Dukla Banská Bystrica
- Discipline: Road
- Role: Rider (retired); Directeur sportif

Professional teams
- 2001–2002: De Nardi–Pasta Montegrappa
- 2004–2017: Dukla Trenčín

Managerial team
- 2018–: Dukla Banská Bystrica

Maroš Kováč (born 11 April 1977 in Košice) is a Slovak former road bicycle racer, who competed professionally between 2001 and 2017 for the De Nardi–Pasta Montegrappa and Dukla Banská Bystrica teams. He now works as a directeur sportif for UCI Continental team Dukla Banská Bystrica.

== Major results ==
=== Cyclo-cross ===
1996–1997
2nd National Championships
1997–1998
3rd National Championships
2003–2004
5th World Military Championships
2004–2005
3rd Ispaster
2005–2006
1st National Championships
3rd Hlinsko
2006–2007
2nd National Championships
2007–2008
3rd National Championships

=== Road ===
2001
1st Team time trial, National Road Championships
2002
1st Team time trial, National Road Championships
1st Stage 1 Tour d'Egypte
1st Prologue Presidential Cycling Tour of Turkey
2003
1st Stage 7 Tour of South China Sea
2nd Overall Tour d'Egypte

1st Stage 6

4th Time trial, World Military Championships
2004
1st Overall Tour d'Egypte

1st Prologue, Stages 2, 3 & 6

2005
1st Stage 1 Grand Prix Cycliste de Gemenc
1st Stage 3 Okolo Slovenska
3rd Grand Prix Bradlo
3rd Coupe des Carpathes
5th Overall Tour d'Egypte

1st Stage 1

2006
1st Road race, National Road Championships
1st Stage 2 Tour de Serbie
1st Stage 5 Tour du Maroc
2nd Overall Kosice–Tatry–Kosice
3rd Overall Grand Prix Cycliste de Gemenc
3rd Memoriał Andrzeja Trochanowskiego
4th Overall Tour d'Egypte
5th Grand Prix Bradlo
6th Overall Tour of Małopolska
8th Overall Tour de Taiwan
2007
Tour d'Egypte

1st Prologue & Stage 4

1st Stage 2 Presidential Cycling Tour of Turkey
3rd Road race, National Road Championships
3rd Overall Kosice–Tatry–Kosice
3rd Beograd–Cacak
5th Rutland–Melton CiCLE Classic
6th Overall Okolo Slovenska

1st Stage 4a (ITT)

6th GP Hydraulika Mikolasek
2008
2nd Beograd–Cacak
2nd Grand Prix Bradlo
3rd Coupe des Carpathes
4th Overall Tour of Libya
6th Overall Vuelta Ciclista Chiapas
6th Scandinavian Race Uppsala
8th Overall Umm Al Quwain Race

1st Stage 3

9th Overall Bałtyk–Karkonosze Tour
2009
4th Coupe des Carpathes
6th East Midlands International CiCLE Classic
7th Grand Prix Kooperativa
2010
2nd Banja Luka–Beograd I
3rd Overall Okolo Slovenska
4th Overall The Paths of King Nikola

1st Stage 2

4th Central European Tour Miskolc GP
6th GP Hydraulika Mikolasek
8th Overall Tour de Serbie
8th Coupe des Carpathes
9th Memoriał Henryka Łasaka
2011
1st Challenge Khouribga, Challenge des phosphates
2012
1st Tour Bohemia
1st Stage 2 Kosice–Tatry–Kosice
1st Stage 3 Czech Cycling Tour
7th Overall Okolo Slovenska

1st Points classification

8th Jūrmala Grand Prix
8th Tallinn–Tartu GP
10th Coupe des Carpathes
2013
1st Prologue Sibiu Cycling Tour
National Road Championships

2nd Road race
2nd Time trial

2nd Overall Tour du Maroc
3rd Overall Okolo Slovenska
4th Memorial Oleg Dyachenko
4th Central European Tour Miskolc GP
7th Overall Five Rings of Moscow
8th Banja Luka–Beograd II
2014
1st Stage 3 Okolo Slovenska
2nd Time trial, National Road Championships
3rd Overall Czech Cycling Tour

1st Points classification

8th Grand Prix Královéhradeckého kraje
2015
1st Stage 4 Okolo Slovenska
1st Stage 1 Tour de Hongrie
2nd Time trial, National Road Championships
2nd Korona Kocich Gór
2016
2nd Time trial, National Road Championships
6th Visegrad 4 Bicycle Race – GP Slovakia

=== Mountain biking and hill climbs ===
2005
2nd National Cross-Country Championships
2009
1st National Hill Climb Championships
2010
1st National Hill Climb Championships
