= Central European Tour Budapest GP =

Race details
- Date: July
- Region: Budapest, Hungary
- Discipline: Road
- Competition: UCI Europe Tour
- Type: Single day race
- Web site: www.kerekparsport2000.hu

History
- First edition: 2011
- Editions: 4
- Final edition: 2014
- First winner: Andris Smirnovs (LAT)
- Most wins: No repeat winners
- Final winner: Erik Baška (SVK)

Central European Tour Budapest GP was a cycling race in Hungary. It was first run in 2011 and was part of the UCI Europe Tour as a 1.2 level race. It was held the day after Central European Tour Miskolc GP.

== Past winners ==
Year	Country	Rider	Team
2011	Latvia	Andris Smirnovs	
2012	Slovenia	Marko Kump	Adria Mobil
2013	Hungary	Krisztián Lovassy	Utensilnord Ora24.eu
2014	Slovakia	Erik Baška	Dukla Trenčín–Trek
