= Ján Valach =

Slovak cyclist

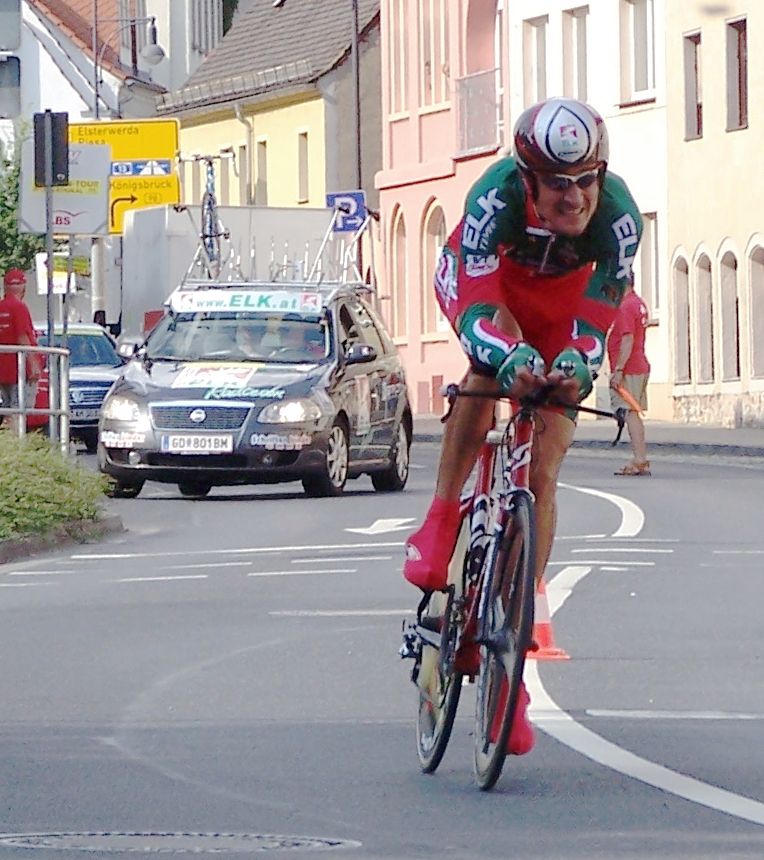
- Valach at Sachsen Tour in 2008

Personal information
- Full name: Ján Valach
- Born: 19 August 1973 (age 53): Myjava, Czechoslovakia; (now Slovakia)
- Height: 1.94 m (6 ft 4 1/2 in)
- Weight: 75 kg (165 lb)

Cycling career
- Sport: Cycling
- Current team: Red Bull–Bora–Hansgrohe
- Discipline: Road
- Role: Rider (retired); Directeur sportif

Professional teams
- 1999–2002: De Nardi–Pasta Montegrappa
- 2004–2005: Ed' System ZVVZ
- 2006: Aposport Krone Linz
- 2007–2009: Elk Haus–Simplon
- 2010: Dukla Trenčín–Merida

Managerial teams
- 2011–2014: Dukla Trenčín–Merida
- 2015: Cycling Academy
- 2016: Tinkoff
- 2017–2021: Bora–Hansgrohe
- 2022–2023: Team TotalEnergies
- 2024–: Pierre Baguette Cycling

Ján Valach (born 19 August 1973) is a Slovak retired professional road cyclist. He represented his nation Slovakia in two editions of the Olympic Games (1996 and 2008), and later competed as a member of Dukla Trenčín–Merida professional cycling team before his official retirement in 2010. He now works as a directeur sportif for UCI WorldTeam Red Bull–Bora–Hansgrohe.

== Amateur and professional career ==
Born in Myjava, Valach made his official debut as an amateur cyclist at the 1996 Summer Olympics in Atlanta, where he finished sixty-eighth in the men's road race by less than a second behind the peloton leader Abraham Olano of Spain, recording his personal best time in 4:56:48. During his amateur career, Valach has claimed three Slovak titles in elite national championships (1997 and 1998) until having shown his great talent and passion for sport, he turned professional in 1999 with De Nardi–Pasta Montegrappa.

In 2001, Valach became a Slovak champion in both road race and time trial at the elite championships, and thereby continued to defend both titles in the same tournament by the following year. When De Nardi–Pasta Montegrappa folded after the 2002 season, Valach was left with no contract. Competing under a freelance agent, Valach pulled ahead from a vast field of cyclists to dominate the road race at the 2003 Coupe des Carpathes in Poland in 3:57:03.

Valach signed a two-year contract with Ed' System ZVVZ in 2004 and eventually rode for Austria's Aposport Krone Linz (AKL) in 2006. Following a short demise from AKL and achieving mediocre results in numerous tournaments, Valach joined the Elk Haus–Simplon professional cycling team in the 2007–2008 season. He had solidified his lead by defeating the Austrian cyclist Michael Pichler at Völkermarkter Radsporttage road race, and also sprinted into a second-place finish at the second stage of Sachsen Tour in 5:52:17, trailing behind Great Britain's Dean Downing by less than a second.

Twelve years after competing in his last Olympics, Valach qualified for his second Slovak squad, as a 34-year-old, in the men's road race at the 2008 Summer Olympics in Beijing by receiving a berth from the UCI Europe Tour. Riding against his teammates Roman Broniš and Matej Jurčo, Valach remained as the only Slovak cyclist to successfully complete a grueling race with a sixty-second-place effort in 6:34:26. Valach's official result was later elevated to sixty-first position, when Italy's Davide Rebellin had tested positive for CERA that consequently stripped of his Olympic silver medal. Following his success in road cycling, Valach extended his contract with Elk Haus–Simplon for another annual season (2008–2009).

After he officially retired in 2010, Valach was appointed as the manager and head coach for Slovakia's Dukla Trenčín–Merida cycling team. In October 2016 Bora–Hansgrohe announced that had been appointed as a directeur sportif.

== Major results ==
1996
1st Overall Okolo Slovenska

1st Stage 9

7th Overall Tour de Langkawi
1997
1st Road race, National Road Championships
1998
National Road Championships

1st Road race
1st Time trial

2001
National Road Championships

1st Road race
1st Individual time trial
1st Team time trial

1st Prologue Tour d'Egypte
2002
National Road Championships

1st Individual time trial
1st Team time trial

2003
1st Coupe des Carpathes
2004
2nd Road race, National Road Championships
2005
2nd Time trial, National Road Championships
2007
2nd Road race, National Road Championships
2008
1st Völkermarkter Radsporttage, Austria
2009
3rd Road race, National Road Championships
