= Juraj Bellan =

Slovak cyclist (born 1996)

Personal information
- Born: 30 January 1996 (age 30)

Cycling career
- Sport: Cycling
- Current team: Dukla Banská Bystrica
- Discipline: Road
- Role: Rider

Professional team
- 2016–: Dukla Banská Bystrica

Juraj Bellan (born 30 January 1996) is a Slovak racing cyclist, who currently rides for UCI Continental team Dukla Banská Bystrica. He rode for Dukla Banská Bystrica in the men's team time trial event at the 2018 UCI Road World Championships.

== Major results ==
2013
National Junior Road Championships

2nd Time trial
2nd Road race

2014
1st Time trial, National Junior Road Championships
2015
National Under-23 Road Championships

2nd Time trial
3rd Road race

2017
4th Overall Grand Prix Chantal Biya

1st Stage 4

National Road Championships

4th Time trial
9th Road race

2018
1st Mountains classification Carpathian Couriers Race
National Road Championships

6th Road race
7th Time trial
