= Central European Tour Košice–Miskolc =

Central European Tour Miskolc GP
Race details
- Date: July
- Region: Hungary
- Discipline: Road
- Competition: UCI Europe Tour
- Type: Single day race
- Web site: www.kerekparsport2000.hu

History
- First edition: 2010
- Editions: 5
- Final edition: 2014
- First winner: Alois Kaňkovský (CZE)
- Most wins: No repeat winners
- Final winner: Erik Baška (SVK)

Central European Tour Miskolc GP was a cycling race in Hungary, run between 2010 and 2014. It was held as part of the UCI Europe Tour as a 1.2 level race, the day before the Central European Tour Budapest GP.

== Past winners ==
Year	Country	Rider	Team
2010	Czech Republic	Alois Kaňkovský	
2011	Croatia	Matija Kvasina	Loborika-Favorit Team
2012	Hungary	Krisztián Lovassy	Tuşnad Cycling Team
2013	Belarus	Siarhei Papok	Belarus national team
2014	Slovakia	Erik Baška	Dukla Trenčín–Trek
