= Dukla Banská Bystrica (cycling team) =

Slovakian cycling team

Team information
- UCI code: DKB
- Registered: Slovakia
- Founded: 2004
- Discipline: Road
- Status: Continental

Key personnel
- Team managers: Martin Fraňo; Maroš Kováč; Tomáš Liška; Vladimir Mikúš

Team name history
- 2004–2006 2007–2011 2012–2014 2015 2016–: Dukla Trenčín; Dukla Trenčín–Merida; Dukla Trenčín–Trek; Kemo Dukla Trenčín; Dukla Banská Bystrica

Dukla Banská Bystrica (UCI team code: DKB) is a Continental cycling team founded in 2004. It is based in Slovakia and it participates in UCI Continental Circuits races. Peter Sagan and Peter Velits were also part of the team.

== Team roster ==
As of 10 June 2023.

Rider	Date of birth
Martin Chren (SVK)	8 May 1999 (age 27)
Jakub Galovič (SVK)	30 December 2004 (age 21)
Denis Hoza (SVK)	12 December 2002 (age 23)
Dávid Kaško (SVK)	24 April 1997 (age 29)
Lukáš Kubiš (SVK)	31 January 2000 (age 26)

Rider	Date of birth
Filip Lohinsky (SVK)	24 January 2002 (age 24)
Simon Nagy (SVK)	26 July 2001 (age 25)
Pavol Rovder (SVK)	9 April 2001 (age 25)
Samuel Tuka (SVK)	24 August 2003 (age 23)
Patrik Tybor (SVK)	16 September 1987 (age 38)

== Major wins ==
2004
Overall Tour d'Egypte, Maroš Kováč

Prologue (ITT), Stages 2, 3 & 6, Maroš Kováč

2005
Stage 1 Tour d'Egypte, Maroš Kováč
Stage 6 Tour d'Egypte, Ján Šipeky
Stage 1 GP de Gemenc, Maroš Kováč
Stage 3 Tour de Slovaquie, Maroš Kováč
2006
Slovakia Road Race Championships, Maroš Kováč
Stage 2 Tour de Serbie, Maroš Kováč
Coupe des Carpathes, Roman Broniš
Overall Tour du Maroc, Ján Šipeky

Stage 5, Maroš Kováč
Stage 7, Roman Broniš

2007
Prologue (ITT) & Stage 4 Tour d'Egypte, Maroš Kováč
GP Sharm el-Sheikh, Ján Šipeky
Stage 2 Presidential Cycling Tour of Turkey, Maroš Kováč
Stage 4a Tour de Slovaquie, Maroš Kováč
2008
Stage 3 Umm Al Quwain Race, Maroš Kováč
Stage 4 Umm Al Quwain Race, Roman Broniš
Stages 2, 3, 4 & 7 Tour of Libya, Roman Broniš
Stage 5 Tour of Libya, Ján Šipeky
2009
Slovakia Road Race Championships, Matej Vysna
GP Kooperativa, Peter Sagan
GP Boka, Peter Sagan
Stage 2 GP Bradlo, Patrik Tybor
Stages 2 & 5 Dookoła Mazowsza, Peter Sagan
2010
Stage 4 Vuelta al Uruguay, Matej Jurčo
Stage 2 The Paths of King Nikola, Maroš Kováč
2011
Challenge Khouribga, Maroš Kováč
Stage 1 Dookoła Mazowsza, Matej Jurčo
2012
Stage 3 Czech Cycling Tour, Maroš Kováč
Tour Bohemia, Maroš Kováč
2013
Košice–Miskolc, Michael Kolář
Banja Luka–Belgrad I, Michael Kolář
Stage 2 Carpathia Couriers Path, Michael Kolář
Stage 3 Tour de Serbie, Michael Kolář
Slovakia Under-23 Time Trial Championships, Erik Baška
Prologue (ITT) Sibiu Cycling Tour, Maroš Kováč
Stage 4 Baltic Chain Tour, Patrik Tybor
2014
GP Polski Via Odra, Erik Baška
Stage 3 Okolo Slovenska, Maroš Kováč
Slovakia Under-23 Time Trial Championships, Mario Daško
Central European Tour Košice–Miskolc, Erik Baška
Central European Tour Budapest GP, Erik Baška
2015
Stage 4 Okolo Slovenska, Maroš Kováč
Stage 1 Tour de Hongrie, Maroš Kováč
Stages 1 & 3 Tour of Bulgaria, Patrik Tybor
2016
Stage 6 Tour du Cameroun, Patrik Tybor
Stage 7 Tour du Cameroun, Martin Mahďar
Stage 5 Tour du Maroc, Patrik Tybor
Novi Sad Mountainbike, Martin Haring
Stages 7 & 9 Merida Cup, Juraj Bellan
Banská Bystrica, Martin Mahďar
Kláštor pod Znievom, Patrik Tybor
Rajecké Teplice Criterium, Maroš Kováč
Slovakia Cyclo-cross Championships, Martin Haring
2017
Slovakia Mountainbike (Marathon) Championships, Martin Haring
Slovakia Mountainbike (XC) Championships, Martin Haring
Slovakia Hill Climb Championships, Martin Haring
Stage 1 Grand Prix Chantal Biya, Ján Andrej Cully
2018
Stage 4 Tour du Cameroun, Martin Haring
Slovakia Time Trial Championships, Marek Čanecký
2019
Slovakia Time Trial Championships, Ján Andrej Cully
Stage 2 In the Steps of Romans, Ján Andrej Cully
Stage 4 Tour de Serbie, Ján Andrej Cully
2020
Slovakia Time Trial Championships, Ján Andrej Cully
Stage 2 In the Steps of Romans, Martin Vlčák
Overall Tour de Serbie, Martin Haring

== National Champions ==
2006
Slovakian Road Race, Maroš Kováč

2009
Slovakian Road Race, Matej Vysna

2013
Slovakian U23 Time Trial, Erik Baška

2014
Slovakian U23 Time Trial, Mario Daško

2016
Slovakian Cyclo-cross, Martin Haring

2017
Slovakian Mountainbike (Marathon), Martin Haring
Slovakian Mountainbike (XC), Martin Haring
Slovakian Hill Climb, Martin Haring

2018
Slovakian Time Trial, Marek Čanecký

2019
Slovakian Time Trial, Ján Andrej Cully

2020
Slovakian Time Trial, Ján Andrej Cully
