= Grand Prix Bradlo =

Race details
- Date: Juli
- Region: Slovakia
- Discipline: Road
- Competition: UCI Europe Tour
- Type: Stage race

History
- First edition: 2000
- Editions: 10
- Final edition: 2009
- First winner: Radek Dite (CZE)
- Most wins: No repeat winners
- Final winner: Nebojša Jovanović (SRB)

The Grand Prix Bradlo was a cycling race held annually in Slovakia. It was part of UCI Europe Tour in category 2.2.

== Winners ==
Year	Winner	Second	Third
2000	(Czech Republic) Radek Dite	(Czech Republic) Kamil Vrana	(Czech Republic) Michal Prusa
2001	(Italy) Giampaolo Caruso	(Italy) Damiano Marangoni	(Italy) Diego Nosotti
2002	(Slovenia) Kristjan Fajt	(Czech Republic) Luboš Pelánek	(Slovakia) Radovan Husar
2003	(Slovakia) Roman Broniš	(Slovakia) Matej Jurčo	(Poland) Sebastian Skiba
2004	(Italy) Raffaele Illiano	(Poland) Sebastian Skiba	(Slovakia) Martin Prázdnovský
2005	(Slovakia) Martin Riška	(Austria) Werner Faltheiner	(Slovakia) Maroš Kováč
2006	(Australia) Adam Hansen	(Czech Republic) Tomáš Bucháček	(Slovakia) Ján Valach
2007	(Poland) Maciej Bodnar	(Poland) Maciej Paterski	(Poland) Piotr Osinski
2008	(Hungary) Péter Kusztor	(Slovakia) Maroš Kováč	(Czech Republic) Rostislav Krotký
2009	(Serbia) Nebojša Jovanović	(Slovakia) Ján Valach	(Slovakia) Matej Jurčo
