= List of wins by Team NetApp and its successors =

This is a comprehensive list of victories of the Red Bull–Bora–Hansgrohe cycling team. The races are categorized according to the UCI Continental Circuits rules.

== 2010 – Team NetApp ==
Stage 3 Tour de Normandie, Daniel Schorn
Stage 2 Tour Alsace, Alex Meenhorst
Stages 2 & 6 Okolo Slovenska, Daniel Schorn
Praha–Karlovy Vary–Praha, Andreas Schillinger

== 2011 – Team NetApp ==
South Africa Time Trial Championships, Daryl Impey
Porec Trophy, Blaž Jarc
Overall Tour of Hellas, Stefan Schäfer

Stages 3 & 4, Stefan Schäfer

Stage 7 Tour of Morocco, Daryl Impey
Stage 4 Cinturón Ciclista Internacional a Mallorca, Stefan Schäfer
Stage 1 Tour of Gallipoli, Blaž Jarc

== 2012 – Team NetApp ==
Czech Republic Time Trial Championships, Jan Bárta
Overall Settimana Internazionale di Coppi e Bartali, Jan Bárta

Stage 2b, Team time trial
Stage 5 (ITT), Jan Bárta

Rund um Köln, Jan Bárta
Neuseen Classics, André Schulze
Stages 2 & 3 Course de la Solidarité Olympique, André Schulze
Stage 5 Course de la Solidarité Olympique, Bartosz Huzarski
Grote Prijs Stad Zottegem, Matthias Brändle
Stage 6 Tour of Britain, Leopold König

== 2013 – Team NetApp–Endura ==
Ronde van Drenthe, Alexander Wetterhall
Overall Szlakiem Grodów Piastowskich, Jan Bárta

Stage 2 (ITT), Jan Bárta

Stage 7 Tour of California, Leopold König
Czech Republic Time Trial Championships, Jan Bárta
Czech Republic Road Race Championships, Jan Bárta
British National Circuit Race Championships, Russell Downing
Grote Prijs Stad Zottegem, Blaž Jarc
Overall Czech Cycling Tour, Leopold König

Stage 3, Leopold König

Stage 8 Vuelta a España, Leopold König

== 2014 – Team NetApp–Endura ==
Clásica de Almería, Sam Bennett
Rund um Köln, Sam Bennett
Stage 5 Bayern-Rundfahrt, Sam Bennett
Overall Tour of Slovenia, Tiago Machado
Czech Republic Time Trial Championships, Jan Bárta

== 2015 – Bora–Argon 18 ==
Stage 6 Tour of Qatar, Sam Bennett
Stage 1 Giro del Trentino, Team time trial
Stages 1 & 3 Bayern–Rundfahrt, Sam Bennett
Stage 2 Arctic Race of Norway, Sam Bennett
Czech Republic Time Trial Championships, Jan Bárta
Germany Road Race Championships, Emanuel Buchmann
Paris–Bourges, Sam Bennett

== 2016 – Bora–Argon 18 ==
Stage 1 Critérium International, Sam Bennett
Stage 1 Tour d'Azerbaïdjan, Phil Bauhaus
Stage 5 Tour d'Azerbaïdjan, Michael Schwarzmann
Stage 2 Oberösterreichrundfahrt, Phil Bauhaus
Stage 4 Oberösterreichrundfahrt, Lukas Pöstlberger
Portugal Road Race Championships, José Mendes
Rad am Ring, Paul Voss
Stage 5 Danmark Rundt, Phil Bauhaus
Stage 2 Giro di Toscana, Sam Bennett
Paris–Bourges, Sam Bennett

== 2017 – Bora–Hansgrohe ==
Kuurne–Brussels–Kuurne, Peter Sagan
Stage 3 Paris–Nice, Sam Bennett
Stages 3 & 5 Tirreno–Adriatico, Peter Sagan
Stage 1 Giro d'Italia, Lukas Pöstlberger
Stage 2 Tour of California, Rafał Majka
Stage 3 Tour of California, Peter Sagan
Rund um Köln, Gregor Mühlberger
Stages 5 & 8 Tour de Suisse, Peter Sagan
Overall Tour of Slovenia, Rafał Majka

Stages 1 & 4, Sam Bennett
Stage 3 Rafał Majka

Latvia Time Trial Championships, Aleksejs Saramotins
Czech Republic Time Trial Championships, Jan Bárta
Austria Road Race Championships, Gregor Mühlberger
Slovakia Road Race Championships, Juraj Sagan
Germany Road Race Championships, Marcus Burghardt
Stage 3 Tour de France, Peter Sagan
Stage 20 (ITT) Tour de France, Maciej Bodnar
Stage 1 Tour de Pologne, Peter Sagan
Stages 1 & 3 BinckBank Tour, Peter Sagan
Stages 2 & 4 Czech Cycling Tour, Sam Bennett
Stage 14 Vuelta a España, Rafał Majka
Grand Prix Cycliste de Québec, Peter Sagan
World Road Race Championships, Peter Sagan
Münsterland Giro, Sam Bennett
Stages 1, 2, 3 & 5 Tour of Turkey, Sam Bennett

== 2018 – Bora–Hansgrohe ==
People's Choice Classic, Peter Sagan
Stage 4 Tour Down Under, Peter Sagan
Towards Zero Race Melbourne, Sam Bennett
Cadel Evans Great Ocean Road Race, Jay McCarthy
Gent–Wevelgem, Peter Sagan
Stage 3 Tour of the Basque Country, Jay McCarthy
Paris–Roubaix, Peter Sagan
Stage 5 Tour de Romandie, Pascal Ackermann
Stages 7, 12 & 21 Giro d'Italia, Sam Bennett
Rund um Köln, Sam Bennett
Stage 2 Critérium du Dauphiné, Pascal Ackermann
Stage 2 Tour de Suisse, Peter Sagan
Poland National Time Trial, Maciej Bodnar
Slovakia National Road Race, Peter Sagan
Austria National Road Race, Lukas Pöstlberger
Germany National Road Race, Pascal Ackermann
Points classification, Tour de France, Peter Sagan

Stages 2, 5 & 13, Peter Sagan

Grand Prix Cerami, Peter Kennaugh
London–Surrey Classic, Pascal Ackermann
Stages 1 & 2 Tour de Pologne, Pascal Ackermann
Stage 1 (TTT) Czech Cycling Tour
Stage 6 BinckBank Tour, Gregor Mühlberger
Brussels Cycling Classic, Pascal Ackermann
GP de Fourmies, Pascal Ackermann
Stage 2 Okolo Slovenska, Rüdiger Selig
Stage 3 Okolo Slovenska, Matteo Pelucchi
Stages 2, 3 & 6 Tour of Turkey, Sam Bennett
Stage 2 Tour of Guangxi, Pascal Ackermann

== 2019 – Bora–Hansgrohe ==
Stage 7 Vuelta a San Juan, Sam Bennett
Stage 3 Tour Down Under, Peter Sagan
Trofeo Andratx–Lloseta, Emanuel Buchmann
Clásica de Almería, Pascal Ackermann
Stage 7 UAE Tour, Sam Bennett
GP Industria & Artigianato di Larciano, Maximilian Schachmann
Stages 3 & 6 Paris–Nice, Sam Bennett
Bredene–Koksijde Classic, Pascal Ackermann
Stage 5 Volta a Catalunya, Maximilian Schachmann
Stage 7 Volta a Catalunya, Davide Formolo
Stages 1 (ITT), 3 & 4 Tour of the Basque Country, Maximilian Schachmann
Stage 5 Tour of the Basque Country, Emanuel Buchmann
Overall Tour of Turkey, Felix Großschartner

Stages 1 & 2, Sam Bennett
Stage 5, Felix Großschartner

Eschborn–Frankfurt, Pascal Ackermann
Stage 1 Tour of California, Peter Sagan
Points classification, Giro d'Italia, Pascal Ackermann

Stages 2 & 5, Pascal Ackermann
Stage 12, Cesare Benedetti

Stage 3 Critérium du Dauphiné, Sam Bennett
Stage 3 Tour de Suisse, Peter Sagan
Stage 1 Tour of Slovenia, Pascal Ackermann
Poland National Time Trial, Maciej Bodnar
Germany National Road Race, Maximilian Schachmann
Italy National Road Race, Davide Formolo
Ireland National Road Race, Sam Bennett
Slovakia National Road Race, Juraj Sagan
Austria National Road Race, Patrick Konrad
Points classification, Tour de France, Peter Sagan

Stage 5 Tour de France, Peter Sagan

Stages 1 & 3 Tour de Pologne, Pascal Ackermann
Stages 1, 2 & 3 BinckBank Tour, Sam Bennett
Stage 2 Czech Cycling Tour, Shane Archbold
Stages 3 & 14 Vuelta a España, Sam Bennett
Stage 1 Deutschland Tour, Pascal Ackermann
GP de Fourmies, Pascal Ackermann
Gooikse Pijl, Pascal Ackermann

== 2020 – Bora–Hansgrohe ==
Trofeo Serra de Tramuntana, Emanuel Buchmann
Clásica de Almería, Pascal Ackermann
Stage 1 UAE Tour, Pascal Ackermann
Overall Paris–Nice, Maximilian Schachmann

Stage 1, Maximilian Schachmann

Overall Sibiu Cycling Tour, Gregor Mühlberger

Stages 1 & 3a, Gregor Mühlberger
Stages 2 & 3b, Pascal Ackermann

Stage 1 Vuelta a Burgos, Felix Großschartner
Stage 4 Critérium du Dauphiné, Lennard Kämna
Slovakia National Road Race, Juraj Sagan
Stages 1 & 2 Tirreno–Adriatico, Pascal Ackermann
Stage 16 Tour de France, Lennard Kämna
Stages 1a & 3 Okolo Slovenska, Martin Laas
Stage 10 Giro d'Italia, Peter Sagan
Stages 9 & 18 Vuelta a España, Pascal Ackermann

== 2021 – Bora–Hansgrohe ==
Overall Paris–Nice, Maximilian Schachmann
Stage 5 Volta a Catalunya, Lennard Kämna
Stage 6 Volta a Catalunya, Peter Sagan
Stage 5 Tour of the Alps, Felix Großschartner
Stage 1 Tour de Romandie, Peter Sagan
Stage 2 Tour de Hongrie, Jordi Meeus
Points classification Giro d'Italia, Peter Sagan

Stage 10, Peter Sagan

Stage 2 Critérium du Dauphiné, Lukas Pöstlberger
Grosser Preis des Kantons Aargau, Ide Schelling
Poland National Time Trial, Maciej Bodnar
Austria National Road Race, Patrick Konrad
Germany National Road Race, Maximilian Schachmann
Slovakia National Road Race, Peter Sagan
Overall Sibiu Cycling Tour, Giovanni Aleotti

Prologue & Stage 3, Pascal Ackermann
Stage 1, Giovanni Aleotti

Stage 12 Tour de France, Nils Politt
Stage 16 Tour de France, Patrick Konrad
Stages 2, 3 & 5 Settimana Ciclistica Italiana, Pascal Ackermann
Olympic Games Track Championships (Omnium), Matt Walls
Stage 2 Arctic Race of Norway, Martin Laas
Stage 4 Tour of Norway, Matt Walls
Overall Deutschland Tour, Nils Politt

Stage 1, Pascal Ackermann
Stage 3, Nils Politt

Overall Okolo Slovenska, Peter Sagan
Gran Piemonte, Matt Walls
Paris–Bourges, Jordi Meeus

== 2022 – Bora–Hansgrohe ==
New Zealand National Criterium, Shane Archbold
Overall Volta a la Comunitat Valenciana, Aleksandr Vlasov

Stage 3, Aleksandr Vlasov

Colombia National Road Race, Sergio Higuita
Stage 5 Vuelta a Andalucía, Lennard Kämna
Stage 5 Volta ao Algarve, Sergio Higuita
Overall Volta a Catalunya, Sergio Higuita
Stage 3 Tour of the Alps, Lennard Kämna
Overall Tour de Romandie, Aleksandr Vlasov

Stage 4, Sergio Higuita
Stage 5 (ITT), Aleksandr Vlasov

Eschborn–Frankfurt, Sam Bennett
Overall Giro d'Italia, Jai Hindley

Stage 4, Lennard Kämna
Stage 9, Jai Hindley

Rund um Köln, Nils Politt
Stage 4 Tour of Norway, Marco Haller
Stage 5 Tour de Suisse, Aleksandr Vlasov
Austria National Time Trial, Felix Großschartner
Germany National Time Trial, Lennard Kämna
Germany National Road Race, Nils Politt
Austria National Road Race, Felix Großschartner
Overall Sibiu Cycling Tour, Giovanni Aleotti

Stages 2 & 3a (ITT), Giovanni Aleotti

Stage 3 Tour de Pologne, Sergio Higuita
Stages 2 & 3 Vuelta a España, Sam Bennett
Bemer Cyclassics, Marco Haller
Stage 5 Tour of Britain, Jordi Meeus
Primus Classic, Jordi Meeus

== 2023 – Bora–Hansgrohe ==
Stage 1 Vuelta a San Juan, Sam Bennett
Stage 2 Tour of the Basque Country, Ide Schelling
Stage 5 Tour of the Basque Country, Sergio Higuita
Stage 3 Tour of the Alps, Lennard Kämna
Stages 12 & 14 Giro d'Italia, Nico Denz
Circuit de Wallonie, Jordi Meeus
Rund um Köln, Danny van Poppel
Stage 3 Tour of Slovenia, Ide Schelling
Ireland National Time Trial, Ryan Mullen
Germany National Time Trial, Nils Politt
Austria National Time Trial, Patrick Gamper
Germany National Road Race, Emanuel Buchmann
Stage 5 Tour de France, Jai Hindley
Stage 21 Tour de France, Jordi Meeus
Stages 1 & 4a Sibiu Cycling Tour, Sam Bennett
Stage 3 Sibiu Cycling Tour, Max Schachmann
Overall Czech Tour, Florian Lipowitz

Stage 2, Florian Lipowitz

Stage 9 Vuelta a España, Lennard Kämna
Stage 6 Tour of Britain, Danny van Poppel
Stage 5 Presidential Tour of Turkey, Nico Denz

== 2024 – Bora–Hansgrohe/Red Bull–Bora–Hansgrohe ==
Stages 1, 3 & 4 Tour Down Under, Sam Welsford
Colombia National Time Trial, Daniel Martínez
Stages 2 & 5 Volta ao Algarve, Daniel Martínez
Stage 7 Paris–Nice, Aleksandr Vlasov
Stage 1 (ITT) Tour of the Basque Country, Primož Roglič
Stage 1 Tour de Hongrie, Sam Welsford
Stage 3 Tour of Norway, Jordi Meeus
Overall Critérium du Dauphiné, Primož Roglič

Stages 6 & 7, Primož Roglič

Overall Tour of Slovenia, Giovanni Aleotti

Stage 3, Giovanni Aleotti

Poland National Time Trial, Filip Maciejuk
Austria National Road Race, Alexander Hajek
Overall Sibiu Cycling Tour, Florian Lipowitz
Stage 1 Tour de Wallonie, Jordi Meeus
Overall Vuelta a España, Primož Roglič

Stages 4, 8 & 19, Primož Roglič

Grand Prix de Wallonie, Roger Adrià

== 2025 – Red Bull–Bora–Hansgrohe ==
Stages 1, 2 & 6 Tour Down Under, Sam Welsford
New Zealand National Time Trial, Finn Fisher-Black
Stage 1 Vuelta a Andalucía, Maxim Van Gils
Stage 3 Volta ao Algarve, Jordi Meeus
Overall Volta a Catalunya, Primož Roglič

Stages 4 & 7, Primož Roglič

Stages 1 & 2 Tour de Hongrie, Danny van Poppel
Stage 18 Giro d'Italia, Nico Denz
Stage 3 Tour of Norway, Maxim Van Gils
Stage 6 Tour de Suisse, Jordi Meeus
Copenhagen Sprint, Jordi Meeus
Poland National Time Trial, Filip Maciejuk
Ireland National Time Trial, Ryan Mullen
Netherlands National Road Race, Danny van Poppel

== 2026 – Red Bull–Bora–Hansgrohe ==
Trofeo Ses Salines (TTT), Red Bull–Bora–Hansgrohe
Trofeo Serra Tramuntana, Remco Evenepoel
Trofeo Andratx - Pollença, Remco Evenepoel
Trofeo Palma , Arne Marit
Overall Volta a la Comunitat Valenciana, Remco Evenepoel
Stages 2 & 4 Remco Evenepoel
Stage 2 UAE Tour
Le Samyn, Jordi Meeus

== Supplementary statistics ==
Grand Tours by highest finishing position
Race	2011	2012	2013	2014	2015	2016	2017	2018	2019	2020	2021	2022	2023	2024
Giro d'Italia	–	65	–	–	–	–	16	7	6	8	32	1	9	2
Tour de France	–	–	–	7	25	21	15	19	4	33	5	5	7	18
Vuelta a España	–	–	9	–	–	54	39	12	6	9	10	10	7	1
Major week-long stage races by highest finishing position
Race	2011	2012	2013	2014	2015	2016	2017	2018	2019	2020	2021	2022	2023	2024
Tour Down Under	–	–	–	–	–	–	3	19	21	60	NH		16	13
Paris–Nice	–	–	–	–	–	–	26	7	12	1	1	DNF (Note: The team pulled out on the final stage citing "race was super tough, windy, rainy and cold")	19	5
Tirreno–Adriatico	–	–	23	15	33	33	24	7	22	3	5	5	4	3
Volta a Catalunya	–	–	–	–	–	–	11	59	7	NH	5	1	8	4
Tour of the Basque Country	–	–	–	–	–	–	7	4	3	NH	13	3	6	12
Giro del Trentino	–	23	20	6	6	5	7	48	6	NH	12	16	6	18
Tour de Romandie	–	–	–	–	–	–	10	9	4	NH	10	1	6	2
Critérium du Dauphiné	–	–	49	11	23	20	7	6	3	8	4	12	4	1
Tour de Suisse	34	–	–	–	–	–	13	28	3	NH	4	2	7	12
Tour de Pologne	7	47	30	–	–	–	2	6	7	4	11	8	19	30
Benelux Tour	–	–	–	–	–	–	7	8	19	11	18	NH (Note: The race was cancelled due to an overcrowded calendar.)	29	9
Monument races by highest finishing position
Monument	2011	2012	2013	2014	2015	2016	2017	2018	2019	2020	2021	2022	2023	2024
Milan–San Remo	–	–	–	67	78	23	2	6	4	4	4	50	17	12
Tour of Flanders	–	71	28	31	40	20	27	6	11	37	14	16	20	33
Paris–Roubaix	64	70	33	56	16	24	16	1	5	NH	57	14	35	8
Liège–Bastogne–Liège	–	–	–	17	23	15	10	7	2	21	9	5	8	20
Giro di Lombardia	–	–	24	18	14	–	26	7	8	7	41	4	4	
Classics by highest finishing position
Classic	2011	2012	2013	2014	2015	2016	2017	2018	2019	2020	2021	2022	2023	2024
Omloop Het Nieuwsblad	89	83	41	51	94	16	2	10	6	12	10	27	7	33
Kuurne–Brussels–Kuurne	–	32	–	15	19	10	1	24	17	16	7	27	8	12
Strade Bianche	–	–	–	–	–	–	53	8	29	3	32	10	24	20
E3 Harelbeke	73	–	–	–	–	34	5	26	17	NH	DNS (Note: The team pulled out after Matthew Walls tested positive for Covid.)	17	13	26
Gent–Wevelgem	–	–	–	12	17	–	3	1	8	15	DNS (Note: The team did not start due to covid guidelines.)	22	9	3
Amstel Gold Race	–	–	27	–	–	–	17	4	5	NH	3	48	12	14
La Flèche Wallonne	–	–	–	–	–	–	16	10	5	7	10	3	67	26
Clásica de San Sebastián	–	–	–	–	–	–	19	32	6	NH	75	36	3	15

Legend
—	Did not compete
DNF	Did not finish
DNS	Did not start
NH	Not held
