= 2021 Bora–Hansgrohe season =

Bora–Hansgrohe
- 2021 season
- UCI code: BOH
- Status: UCI WorldTeam
- World Tour Rank: 7th
- Manager: Ralph Denk (GER)
- Main sponsor(s): BORA; Hansgrohe
- Based: Germany
- Bicycles: Specialized
- Groupset: Shimano

Season victories
- One-day races: 2
- Stage race overall: 4
- Stage race stages: 19
- National Championships: 4
- Most wins: Pascal Ackermann (GER) (9)
- Best ranked rider: Maximilian Schachmann (GER) (22nd)
- Jersey

The 2021 season for Bora–Hansgrohe was its 12th season overall and its fifth season as a UCI WorldTeam. It was also the fifth season under the current name.

== Team roster ==
As of 10 June 2021.

Rider	Date of birth
Pascal Ackermann (GER)	17 January 1994 (aged 26)
Giovanni Aleotti (ITA)	25 May 1999 (aged 21)
Erik Baška (SVK)	12 January 1994 (aged 26)
Cesare Benedetti (Note: In August 2021, Benedetti began racing under a Polish licence after becoming a naturalised citizen, having previously racing under an Italian licence.) (POL)	3 August 1987 (aged 33)
Maciej Bodnar (POL)	7 March 1985 (aged 35)
Emanuel Buchmann (GER)	18 November 1992 (aged 28)
Marcus Burghardt (GER)	30 June 1983 (aged 37)
Matteo Fabbro (ITA)	10 April 1995 (aged 25)
Patrick Gamper (AUT)	18 February 1997 (aged 23)
Felix Großschartner (AUT)	23 December 1993 (aged 27)
Lennard Kämna (GER)	9 September 1996 (aged 24)
Wilco Kelderman (NED)	25 March 1991 (aged 29)
Patrick Konrad (AUT)	13 October 1991 (aged 29)
Martin Laas (EST)	15 September 1993 (aged 27)
Jordi Meeus (BEL)	1 July 1998 (aged 22)

Rider	Date of birth
Daniel Oss (ITA)	13 January 1987 (aged 33)
Anton Palzer (Note: Palzer officially joined the team on 1 April, after the conclusion of the ski mountaineering season.) (GER)	11 March 1993 (aged 27)
Nils Politt (GER)	6 March 1994 (aged 26)
Lukas Pöstlberger (AUT)	10 January 1992 (aged 28)
Juraj Sagan (SVK)	23 December 1988 (aged 32)
Peter Sagan (SVK)	26 January 1990 (aged 30)
Maximilian Schachmann (GER)	9 January 1994 (aged 26)
Ide Schelling (NED)	6 February 1998 (aged 22)
Andreas Schillinger (GER)	13 July 1983 (aged 37)
Michael Schwarzmann (GER)	7 January 1991 (aged 29)
Rüdiger Selig (GER)	19 February 1989 (aged 31)
Matthew Walls (GBR)	20 April 1998 (aged 22)
Frederik Wandahl (DEN)	9 May 2001 (aged 19)
Ben Zwiehoff (GER)	22 February 1994 (aged 26)

Riders who joined the team for the 2021 season

Rider	2020 team
Giovanni Aleotti	neo-pro (Cycling Team Friuli ASD)
Wilco Kelderman	Team Sunweb
Jordi Meeus	neo-pro (SEG Racing Academy)
Anton Palzer	neo-pro (ski mountaineer)
Nils Politt	Israel Start-Up Nation
Matthew Walls	neo-pro (Trinity Racing)
Frederik Wandahl	neo-pro (Team ColoQuick)
Ben Zwiehoff	neo-pro (Team Centurion–Vaude mountain biking)

Riders who left the team during or after the 2020 season

Rider	2021 team
Jempy Drucker	Cofidis
Oscar Gatto	Retired
Rafał Majka	UAE Team Emirates
Jay McCarthy	
Gregor Mühlberger	Movistar Team
Paweł Poljański	Retired

== Season victories ==
Date	Race	Competition	Rider	Country	Location	Ref.
14 March	Paris–Nice, Overall	UCI World Tour	Maximilian Schachmann (GER)	France		
26 March	Volta a Catalunya, Stage 5	UCI World Tour	Lennard Kämna (GER)	Spain	Manresa	
27 March	Volta a Catalunya, Stage 6	UCI World Tour	Peter Sagan (SVK)	Spain	Mataró	
23 April	Tour of the Alps, Stage 5	UCI Europe Tour; UCI ProSeries	Felix Großschartner (AUT)	Italy	Riva del Garda	
28 April	Tour de Romandie, Stage 1	UCI World Tour	Peter Sagan (SVK)	Switzerland	Martigny	
13 May	Tour de Hongrie, Stage 2	UCI Europe Tour	Jordi Meeus (BEL)	Hungary	Nagykanizsa	
17 May	Giro d'Italia, Stage 10	UCI World Tour	Peter Sagan (SVK)	Italy	Foligno	
30 May	Giro d'Italia, Points classification	UCI World Tour	Peter Sagan (SVK)	Italy		
31 May	Critérium du Dauphiné, Stage 2	UCI World Tour	Lukas Pöstlberger (AUT)	France	Saugues	
4 June	Grosser Preis des Kantons Aargau	UCI Europe Tour	Ide Schelling (NED)	Switzerland	Leuggern	
3 July	Sibiu Cycling Tour, Prologue (ITT)	UCI Europe Tour	Pascal Ackermann (GER)	Romania	Sibiu	
4 July	Sibiu Cycling Tour, Stage 1	UCI Europe Tour	Giovanni Aleotti (ITA)	Romania	Păltiniș	
6 July	Sibiu Cycling Tour, Stage 3	UCI Europe Tour	Pascal Ackermann (GER)	Romania	Sibiu	
6 July	Sibiu Cycling Tour, Overall	UCI Europe Tour	Giovanni Aleotti (ITA)	Romania		
6 July	Sibiu Cycling Tour, Points classification	UCI Europe Tour	Pascal Ackermann (GER)	Romania		
6 July	Sibiu Cycling Tour, Young rider classification	UCI Europe Tour	Giovanni Aleotti (ITA)	Romania		
8 July	Tour de France, Stage 12	UCI World Tour	Nils Politt (GER)	France	Nîmes	
13 July	Tour de France, Stage 16	UCI World Tour	Patrick Konrad (AUT)	France	Saint-Gaudens	
15 July	Settimana Ciclistica Italiana, Stage 2	UCI Europe Tour	Pascal Ackermann (GER)	Italy	Oristano	
16 July	Settimana Ciclistica Italiana, Stage 3	UCI Europe Tour	Pascal Ackermann (GER)	Italy	Cagliari	
18 July	Settimana Ciclistica Italiana, Stage 5	UCI Europe Tour	Pascal Ackermann (GER)	Italy	Cagliari	
18 July	Settimana Ciclistica Italiana, Points classification	UCI Europe Tour	Pascal Ackermann (GER)	Italy		
18 July	Settimana Ciclistica Italiana, Young rider classification	UCI Europe Tour	Giovanni Aleotti (ITA)	Italy		
6 August	Arctic Race of Norway, Stage 2	UCI Europe Tour; UCI ProSeries	Martin Laas (EST)	Finland	Kilpisjärvi	
22 August	Tour of Norway, Stage 4	UCI Europe Tour; UCI ProSeries	Matthew Walls (GBR)	Norway	Stavanger	
26 August	Deutschland Tour, Stage 1	UCI Europe Tour; UCI ProSeries	Pascal Ackermann (GER)	Germany	Schwerin	
28 August	Deutschland Tour, Stage 3	UCI Europe Tour; UCI ProSeries	Nils Politt (GER)	Germany	Erlangen	
29 August	Deutschland Tour, Overall	UCI Europe Tour; UCI ProSeries	Nils Politt (GER)	Germany		
29 August	Deutschland Tour, Points classification	UCI Europe Tour; UCI ProSeries	Pascal Ackermann (GER)	Germany		
19 September	Okolo Slovenska, Overall	UCI Europe Tour	Peter Sagan (SVK)	Slovakia		
19 September	Okolo Slovenska, Points classification	UCI Europe Tour	Peter Sagan (SVK)	Slovakia		
7 October	Gran Piemonte	UCI Europe Tour; UCI ProSeries	Matthew Walls (GBR)	Italy	Borgosesia	
7 October	Paris–Bourges	UCI Europe Tour	Jordi Meeus (BEL)	France	Bourges	

== National, Continental, and World Champions ==
Date	Discipline	Jersey	Rider	Country	Location	Ref.
17 June	Polish National Time Trial Championships		Maciej Bodnar (POL)	Poland	Chmielno	
20 June	Austrian National Road Race Championships		Patrick Konrad (AUT)	Austria	Kufstein	
20 June	German National Road Race Championships		Maximilian Schachmann (GER)	Germany	Filderstadt	
20 June	Slovak National Road Race Championships		Peter Sagan (SVK)	Slovakia	Bánovce nad Bebravou	
