= Sergio Samitier =

Spanish cyclist

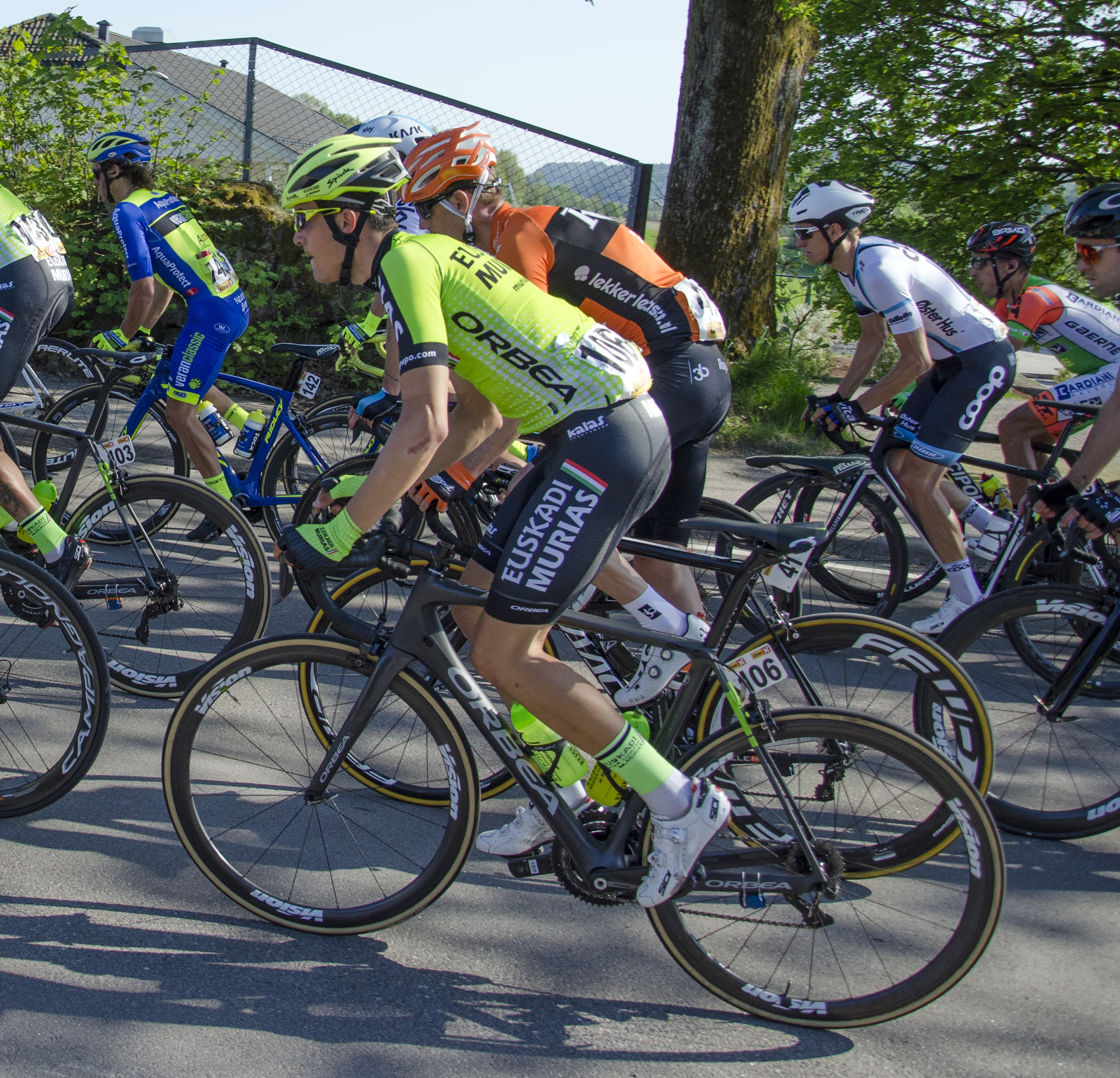
- Samitier in 2018.

Personal information
- Full name: Sergio Samitier Samitier
- Born: 31 August 1995 (age 31) Barbastro, Spain
- Height: 1.81 m (5 ft 11 in)
- Weight: 63 kg (139 lb)

Cycling career
- Sport: Cycling
- Current team: Cofidis
- Discipline: Road
- Role: Rider
- Rider type: Climber

Amateur team
- 2014–2017: Lizarte–AD Galibier

Professional teams
- 2018–2019: Euskadi–Murias
- 2020–2024: Movistar Team
- 2025–: Cofidis

Sergio Samitier Samitier (born 31 August 1995 in Barbastro) is a Spanish cyclist, who currently rides for UCI WorldTeam Cofidis. He has previously ridden for Lizarte, Euskadi–Murias and Movistar Team. In August 2019, he was named in the startlist for the 2019 Vuelta a España. In October 2020, he was named in the startlist for the 2020 Giro d'Italia, where he finished 13th overall.

== Major results ==
2016
4th Time trial, National Under-23 Road Championships
2017
2nd Time trial, National Under-23 Road Championships
2019
1st Mountains classification, Tour of the Alps
Combativity award Stage 15 Vuelta a España
2021
6th Overall Settimana Ciclistica Italiana
2023
1st Mountains classification, Tour of the Alps
2025
Combativity award Stage 8 Vuelta a España

=== Grand Tour general classification results timeline ===
Grand Tour	2019	2020	2021	2022
Giro d'Italia	—	13	—	DNF
Tour de France	—	—	—	—
Vuelta a España	112	—	—	—

Legend
—	Did not compete
DNF	Did not finish
