= 2020 UEC European Track Championships – Men's omnium =

Men's omnium at the 2020 UEC European Track Championships
- Venue: Kolodruma, Plovdiv
- Date: 13 November
- Competitors: 19 from 19 nations
- Winning points: 128

Medalists
gold medal	Matthew Walls	Great Britain
silver medal	Yauheni Karaliok	Belarus
bronze medal	Iúri Leitão	Portugal

The men's omnium competition at the 2020 UEC European Track Championships was held on 13 November 2020.

== Results ==
=== Scratch race ===
Rank	Name	Nation	Laps down	Event points
1	Denis Rugovac	Czech Republic		40
2	Yauheni Karaliok	Belarus		38
3	Matthew Walls	Great Britain		36
4	Albert Torres	Spain		34
5	Daniel Staniszewski	Poland		32
6	Iúri Leitão	Portugal		30
7	Daniel Crista	Romania		28
8	Stefano Moro	Italy	–1	26
9	Sergey Rostovtsev	Russia	–1	24
10	Itamar Einhorn	Israel	–1	22
11	Andreas Müller	Austria	–1	20
12	Maksym Vasilyev	Ukraine	–1	18
13	Justas Beniušis	Lithuania	–1	16
14	Christos Volikakis	Greece	–1	14
15	Claudio Imhof	Switzerland	–1	12
16	Nikolay Genov	Bulgaria	–1	10
17	Krisztián Lovassy	Hungary	–1	8
18	Žiga Jerman	Slovenia	–1	6
19	Lukáš Kubiš	Slovakia	–2	4

=== Tempo race ===
Rank	Name	Nation	Points in race	Event points
1	Matthew Walls	Great Britain	50	40
2	Iúri Leitão	Portugal	47	38
3	Yauheni Karaliok	Belarus	44	36
4	Sergey Rostovtsev	Russia	23	34
5	Albert Torres	Spain	23	32
6	Daniel Crista	Romania	22	30
7	Stefano Moro	Italy	21	28
8	Daniel Staniszewski	Poland	4	26
9	Denis Rugovac	Czech Republic	1	24
10	Krisztián Lovassy	Hungary	0	22
11	Andreas Müller	Austria	0	20
12	Claudio Imhof	Switzerland	0	18
13	Maksym Vasilyev	Ukraine	0	16
14	Justas Beniušis	Lithuania	0	14
15	Itamar Einhorn	Israel	0	12
16	Lukáš Kubiš	Slovakia	–20	10
17	Žiga Jerman	Slovenia	–20	8
18	Nikolay Genov	Bulgaria	–40	6
	Christos Volikakis	Greece	DNS	

=== Elimination race ===
Rank	Name	Nation	Event points
1	Sergey Rostovtsev	Russia	40
2	Matthew Walls	Great Britain	38
3	Yauheni Karaliok	Belarus	36
4	Daniel Staniszewski	Poland	34
5	Albert Torres	Spain	32
6	Denis Rugovac	Czech Republic	30
7	Stefano Moro	Italy	28
8	Claudio Imhof	Switzerland	26
9	Itamar Einhorn	Israel	24
10	Justas Beniušis	Lithuania	22
11	Maksym Vasilyev	Ukraine	20
12	Andreas Müller	Austria	18
13	Nikolay Genov	Bulgaria	16
14	Krisztián Lovassy	Hungary	14
15	Iúri Leitão	Portugal	12
16	Lukáš Kubiš	Slovakia	10
17	Žiga Jerman	Slovenia	8
18	Daniel Crista	Romania	6

=== Points race and final standings ===
The final ranking is given by the sum of the points obtained in the 4 specialties.

Overall rank	Name	Nation	Scratch race	Tempo race	Elim. race	Subotal	Lap points	Sprint points	Finish order	Total points
1st place, gold medalist(s)	Matthew Walls	Great Britain	36	40	38	114	0	14	7	128
2nd place, silver medalist(s)	Yauheni Karaliok	Belarus	38	36	36	110	0	6	13	116
3rd place, bronze medalist(s)	Iúri Leitão	Portugal	30	38	12	80	20	15	2	115
4	Daniel Staniszewski	Poland	32	26	34	92	0	12	4	104
5	Sergey Rostovtsev	Russia	24	34	40	98	0	6	9	104
6	Albert Torres	Spain	34	32	32	98	0	4	16	102
7	Denis Rugovac	Czech Republic	40	24	30	94	0	5	5	99
8	Stefano Moro	Italy	26	28	28	82	0	15	3	97
9	Daniel Crista	Romania	28	30	6	64	20	5	10	89
10	Krisztián Lovassy	Hungary	8	22	14	44	0	25	1	69
11	Itamar Einhorn	Israel	22	12	24	58	0	3	8	61
12	Andreas Müller	Austria	20	20	18	58	0	3	15	61
13	Claudio Imhof	Switzerland	12	18	26	56	0	2	14	58
14	Maksym Vasilyev	Ukraine	18	16	20	54	0	2	6	56
15	Justas Beniušis	Lithuania	16	14	22	52	0	4	11	56
16	Lukáš Kubiš	Slovakia	4	10	10	24	–40	0	12	–16
17	Nikolay Genov	Bulgaria	10	6	16	32	–80	0	DNF	–48
	Žiga Jerman	Slovenia	6	8	8	22	–20	0	Did not finish	
	Christos Volikakis	Greece	14	Did not start						
