= 2021 UEC European Track Championships – Men's elimination race =

Men's elimination race at the 2021 UEC European Track Championships
- Venue: Tissot Velodrome, Grenchen
- Date: 5 October
- Competitors: 22 from 22 nations

Medalists
gold medal	Sergey Rostovtsev	Russia
silver medal	João Matias	Portugal
bronze medal	Thomas Boudat	France

The men's elimination race competition at the 2021 UEC European Track Championships was held on 5 October 2021.

== Results ==
Rank	Name	Nation
1st place, gold medalist(s)	Sergey Rostovtsev	Russia
2nd place, silver medalist(s)	João Matias	Portugal
3rd place, bronze medalist(s)	Thomas Boudat	France
4	Nico Selenati	Switzerland
5	Tim Torn Teutenberg	Germany
6	JB Murphy	Ireland
7	Damian Sławek	Poland
8	Erik Martorell	Spain
9	Stefano Moro	Italy
10	Gerben Thijssen	Belgium
11	Rotem Tene	Israel
12	Maikel Zijlaard	Netherlands
13	Volodymyr Dzhus	Ukraine
14	Yauheni Karaliok	Belarus
15	William Perrett	Great Britain
16	Maximilian Schmidbauer	Austria
17	Nikolay Genov	Bulgaria
18	Denis Rugovac	Czech Republic
19	Dimitrios Christakos	Greece
20	Gergő Orosz	Hungary
21	Mantas Bitinas	Lithuania
22	Robin Juel Skivild	Denmark
