= 2020 UCI Track Cycling World Championships – Men's scratch =

Men's scratch at the 2020 UCI Track Cycling World Championships
- Venue: Velodrom
- Location: Berlin, Germany
- Dates: 27 February
- Competitors: 24 from 24 nations

Medalists
gold medal	Yauheni Karaliok	Belarus
silver medal	Simone Consonni	Italy
bronze medal	Sebastián Mora	Spain

The Men's scratch competition at the 2020 UCI Track Cycling World Championships was held on 27 February 2020.

== Results ==
The race was started at 19:57. First rider across the line without a net lap loss won.

Rank	Name	Nation	Laps down
1st place, gold medalist(s)	Yauheni Karaliok	Belarus	
2nd place, silver medalist(s)	Simone Consonni	Italy	
3rd place, bronze medalist(s)	Sebastián Mora	Spain	
4	Matthew Walls	Great Britain	
5	Roy Eefting	Netherlands	
6	Adrian Hegyvary	United States	
7	Maximilian Beyer	Germany	−1
8	Ignacio Prado	Mexico	−1
9	Iúri Leitão	Portugal	−1
10	Guo Liang	China	−1
11	Felix English	Ireland	−1
12	Sam Welsford	Australia	−1
13	Christos Volikakis	Greece	−1
14	Krisztián Lovassy	Hungary	−1
15	Daniel Babor	Czech Republic	−1
16	Roman Gladysh	Ukraine	−1
17	Yacine Chalel	Algeria	−1
18	Filip Prokopyszyn	Poland	−1
19	Mow Ching Yin	Hong Kong	−1
20	Mauro Schmid	Switzerland	−1
21	Alisher Zhumakan	Kazakhstan	−1
22	Stefan Matzner	Austria	−1
23	Nicholas Kergozou	New Zealand	−1
24	Andrei Sazanov	Russia	−1
