= Roland Thalmann =

Swiss cyclist

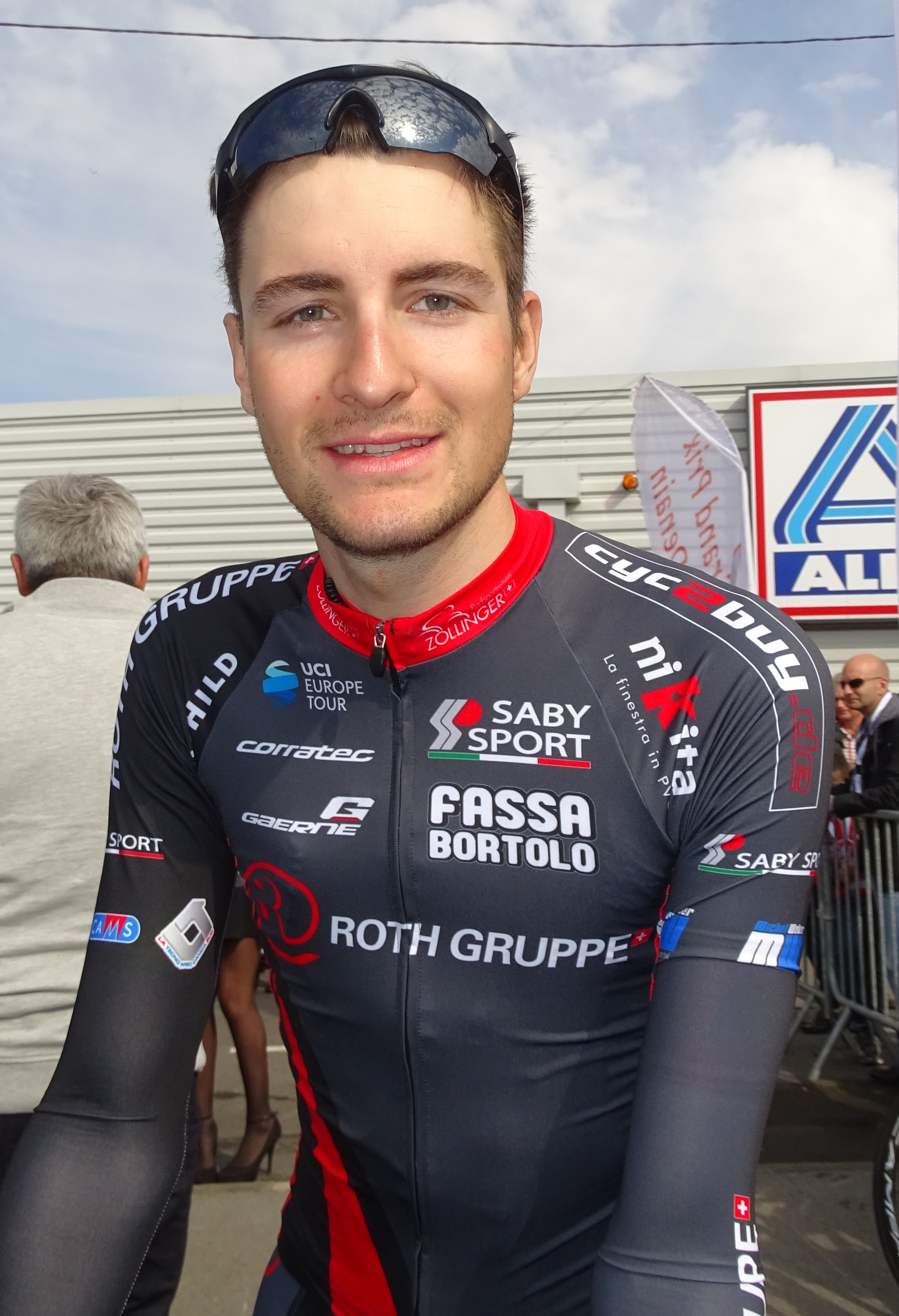
- Thalmann in 2016

Personal information
- Full name: Roland Thalmann
- Born: 15 August 1993 (age 33) Romoos, Switzerland
- Height: 1.78 m (5 ft 10 in)
- Weight: 62 kg (137 lb)

Cycling career
- Sport: Cycling
- Current team: Tudor Pro Cycling Team
- Discipline: Road
- Role: Rider

Professional teams
- 2015–2017: Roth–Škoda
- 2018–2022: Team Vorarlberg Santic
- 2023–: Tudor Pro Cycling Team

Roland Thalmann (born 5 August 1993 in Romoos) is a Swiss cyclist, who currently rides for UCI ProTeam Tudor Pro Cycling Team.

== Major results ==
2016
8th Tour du Doubs
2017
9th Overall Tour of Rhodes
2018
6th Overall Oberösterreichrundfahrt
8th Trofeo Laigueglia
10th Overall Tour of Hainan
10th Giro dell'Appennino
2019
3rd Overall Tour of Rhodes
7th Overall Tour Alsace
7th Croatia–Slovenia
8th Overall Circuit des Ardennes
9th Overall Tour of the Alps
2021
2nd Overall Tour de Savoie Mont-Blanc
6th Overall Sibiu Cycling Tour
6th Overall Tour de la Mirabelle
7th Overall CRO Race
8th Mercan'Tour Classic Alpes-Maritimes
10th Tour du Doubs
2022
3rd Overall Tour Alsace

1st Mountains classification
1st Stage 2

4th Overall Tour of Bulgaria
10th Overall Sibiu Cycling Tour
10th Overall In the footsteps of the Romans
2026
1st Mountains classification, Tour de Romandie
