= 2020 UCI Track Cycling World Championships – Men's omnium =

Men's omnium at the 2020 UCI Track Cycling World Championships
- Venue: Velodrom
- Location: Berlin, Germany
- Dates: 29 February
- Competitors: 24 from 24 nations
- Winning points: 158

Medalists
gold medal	Benjamin Thomas	France
silver medal	Jan-Willem van Schip	Netherlands
bronze medal	Matthew Walls	Great Britain

The Men's omnium competition at the 2020 UCI Track Cycling World Championships was held on 29 February 2020.

== Results ==
=== Scratch race ===
The race was started at 12:12.

Rank	Name	Nation	Laps down	Event points
1	Benjamin Thomas	France		40
2	Matthew Walls	Great Britain		38
3	Lasse Norman Hansen	Denmark	−1	36
4	Artyom Zakharov	Kazakhstan	−1	34
5	Christos Volikakis	Greece	−1	32
6	Campbell Stewart	New Zealand	−1	30
7	Jan-Willem van Schip	Netherlands	−1	28
8	Gavin Hoover	United States	−1	26
9	Elia Viviani	Italy	−1	24
10	Eiya Hashimoto	Japan	−1	22
11	Roger Kluge	Germany	−1	20
12	Daniel Staniszewski	Poland	−1	18
13	Derek Gee	Canada	−1	16
14	Cameron Meyer	Australia	−1	14
15	Leung Ka Yu	Hong Kong	−1	12
16	João Matias	Portugal	−1	10
17	Fabio Van den Bossche	Belgium	−1	8
18	Ignacio Prado	Mexico	−1	6
19	Théry Schir	Switzerland	−1	4
20	Illart Zuazubiskar	Spain	−1	2
21	Raman Tsishkou	Belarus	−1	1
22	Volodymyr Dzhus	Ukraine	−1	1
23	Guo Liang	China	−1	1
24	Krisztián Lovassy	Hungary	−2	1

=== Tempo race ===
The tempo race was started at 14:35.

Rank	Name	Nation	Lap points	Total points	Event points
1	Jan-Willem van Schip	Netherlands	20	31	40
2	Benjamin Thomas	France	20	31	38
3	Roger Kluge	Germany	20	25	36
4	Lasse Norman Hansen	Denmark	20	21	34
5	Derek Gee	Canada	0	2	32
6	Gavin Hoover	United States	0	2	30
7	Matthew Walls	Great Britain	0	1	28
8	Artyom Zakharov	Kazakhstan	0	1	26
9	Eiya Hashimoto	Japan	0	1	24
10	Campbell Stewart	New Zealand	0	1	22
11	Cameron Meyer	Australia	0	0	20
12	Fabio Van den Bossche	Belgium	0	0	18
13	Christos Volikakis	Greece	0	0	16
14	Elia Viviani	Italy	0	0	14
15	João Matias	Portugal	0	0	12
16	Daniel Staniszewski	Poland	0	0	10
17	Théry Schir	Switzerland	0	0	8
18	Krisztián Lovassy	Hungary	0	0	6
19	Guo Liang	China	0	0	4
20	Volodymyr Dzhus	Ukraine	0	0	2
21	Illart Zuazubiskar	Spain	0	0	1
22	Ignacio Prado	Mexico	0	0	1
23	Leung Ka Yu	Hong Kong	0	0	1
24	Raman Tsishkou	Belarus	−20	−20	1

=== Elimination race ===
The elimination race was started at 17:51.

Rank	Name	Nation	Event points
1	Campbell Stewart	New Zealand	40
2	Roger Kluge	Germany	38
3	Jan-Willem van Schip	Netherlands	36
4	Benjamin Thomas	France	34
5	Elia Viviani	Italy	32
6	Eiya Hashimoto	Japan	30
7	Daniel Staniszewski	Poland	28
8	Cameron Meyer	Australia	26
9	Théry Schir	Switzerland	24
10	Gavin Hoover	United States	22
11	Matthew Walls	Great Britain	20
12	Raman Tsishkou	Belarus	18
13	Artyom Zakharov	Kazakhstan	16
14	João Matias	Portugal	14
15	Fabio Van den Bossche	Belgium	12
16	Volodymyr Dzhus	Ukraine	10
17	Leung Ka Yu	Hong Kong	8
18	Ignacio Prado	Mexico	6
19	Derek Gee	Canada	4
20	Christos Volikakis	Greece	2
21	Guo Liang	China	1
22	Krisztián Lovassy	Hungary	1
23	Lasse Norman Hansen	Denmark	1
24	Illart Zuazubiskar	Spain	1

=== Points race and overall standings ===
The race was started at 19:02.

Rank	Name	Nation	Lap points	Sprint points	Total points
1st place, gold medalist(s)	Benjamin Thomas	France	20	26	158
2nd place, silver medalist(s)	Jan-Willem van Schip	Netherlands	20	11	135
3rd place, bronze medalist(s)	Matthew Walls	Great Britain	20	11	117
4	Roger Kluge	Germany	0	3	97
5	Campbell Stewart	New Zealand	0	2	94
6	Cameron Meyer	Australia	20	10	90
7	Gavin Hoover	United States	0	4	82
8	Lasse Norman Hansen	Denmark	0	10	81
9	Elia Viviani	Italy	0	9	79
10	Artyom Zakharov	Kazakhstan	0	1	77
11	Eiya Hashimoto	Japan	0	0	76
12	Derek Gee	Canada	0	12	64
13	Daniel Staniszewski	Poland	0	3	59
14	Christos Volikakis	Greece	0	0	50
15	Théry Schir	Switzerland	0	6	42
16	Fabio Van den Bossche	Belgium	0	0	38
17	João Matias	Portugal	0	0	36
18	Leung Ka Yu	Hong Kong	0	0	21
19	Raman Tsishkou	Belarus	0	0	20
20	Krisztián Lovassy	Hungary	0	10	18
21	Ignacio Prado	Mexico	0	3	16
22	Guo Liang	China	0	0	6
23	Illart Zuazubiskar	Spain	0	0	4
–	Volodymyr Dzhus	Ukraine	Did not finish		
