= 2020 UEC European Track Championships – Men's elimination race =

Men's elimination race at the 2020 UEC European Track Championships
- Venue: Kolodruma, Plovdiv
- Date: 11 November
- Competitors: 17 from 17 nations

Medalists
| gold medal | Matthew Walls | Great Britain |
| silver medal | Iúri Leitão | Portugal |
| bronze medal | Sergey Rostovtsev | Russia |

The men's elimination race competition at the 2020 UEC European Track Championships was held on 11 November 2020.

== Results ==
| Rank | Name | Nation |
|---|---|---|
| 1st place, gold medalist(s) | Matthew Walls | Great Britain |
| 2nd place, silver medalist(s) | Iúri Leitão | Portugal |
| 3rd place, bronze medalist(s) | Sergey Rostovtsev | Russia |
| 4 | Raman Tsishkou | Belarus |
| 5 | Daniel Babor | Czech Republic |
| 6 | Zafeiris Volikakis | Greece |
| 7 | Tristan Marguet | Switzerland |
| 8 | Andreas Müller | Austria |
| 9 | Eduard-Michael Grosu | Romania |
| 10 | Vladiislav Shcherban | Ukraine |
| 11 | Tilen Finkšt | Slovenia |
| 12 | Rotem Tene | Israel |
| 13 | Francesco Lamon | Italy |
| 14 | Óscar Pelegrí | Spain |
| 15 | Mantas Bitinas | Lithuania |
| 16 | Yasen Aleksandrov | Bulgaria |
| 17 | Štefan Michalička | Slovakia |
