= 2021 Sibiu Cycling Tour =

2021 UCI Europe Tour

Race details
- Dates: 3 – 6 July 2021
- Stages: 3 + Prologue
- Distance: 573.2 km (356.2 mi)
- Winning time: 13h 44' 59"

Results
Jersey awarded to the overall winner	Winner	Giovanni Aleotti (ITA)	(Bora–Hansgrohe)
	Second	Fabio Aru (ITA)	(Team Qhubeka NextHash)
	Third	Michal Schlegel (CZE)	(Elkov–Kasper)
Jersey awarded to the points classification winner	Points	Pascal Ackermann (GER)	(Bora–Hansgrohe)
Jersey awarded to the mountains classification winner	Mountains	Daniel Turek (CZE)	(Team Felbermayr–Simplon Wels)
Jersey awarded to the young rider classification winner	Young rider	Giovanni Aleotti (ITA)	(Bora–Hansgrohe)
Jersey awarded to the sprints classification winner	Sprints	Paweł Bernas (POL)	(HRE Mazowsze Serce Polski)
	Team	Elkov–Kasper	

The 2021 Sibiu Cycling Tour was a road cycling stage race that took place between 3 and 6 July 2021 in and around the city of Sibiu, Romania. It was the 11th edition of the Sibiu Cycling Tour and a category 2.1 event on the 2021 UCI Europe Tour.

== Teams ==
Two UCI WorldTeams, four UCI ProTeams, twenty-one UCI Continental teams, and the Romanian national team made up the twenty-eight teams that participated in the race. Only four of these teams did not enter a full squad of six riders; Amore & Vita, D'Amico–UM Tools, Nippo–Provence–PTS Conti, and Yoeleo Test Team p/b 4Mind each entered a squad of five riders. With one further non-starter, D'Amico–UM Tools was reduced to four riders, meaning 163 riders started the race. Of these riders, 148 finished the race.

UCI WorldTeams

- Bora–Hansgrohe
- Team Qhubeka NextHash

UCI ProTeams

- Bardiani–CSF–Faizanè
- Gazprom–RusVelo
- Team Novo Nordisk
- Vini Zabù

UCI Continental Teams

- A.R. Monex Pro Cycling Team
- Abloc CT
- Amore & Vita
- Bike Aid
- Cycling Team Friuli ASD
- D'Amico–UM Tools
- Elkov–Kasper
- Giotti Victoria–Savini Due
- Global 6 Cycling
- HRE Mazowsze Serce Polski
- Hrinkow Advarics Cycleang
- Maloja Pushbikers
- Nippo–Provence–PTS Conti
- Team Felbermayr–Simplon Wels
- Team Illuminate
- Team SKS Sauerland NRW
- Team Vorarlberg
- Topforex–ATT Investments
- Wildlife Generation Pro Cycling
- Work Service–Marchiol–Vega
- Yoeleo Test Team p/b 4Mind

National Teams

- Romania

== Route ==
Stage characteristics and winners
Stage	Date	Course	Distance	Type	Stage winner
P	3 July	Sibiu to Sibiu	2.5 km (1.6 mi)	Prologue	Pascal Ackermann (GER)
1	4 July	Sibiu to Păltiniș	177.9 km (110.5 mi)	Mountain stage	Giovanni Aleotti (ITA)
2	5 July	Sibiu to Bâlea Lac	187.5 km (116.5 mi)	Mountain stage	Alexis Guérin (FRA)
3	6 July	Sibiu to Sibiu	205.3 km (127.6 mi)	Hilly stage	Pascal Ackermann (GER)
Total			573.2 km (356.2 mi)		

== Stages ==
=== Prologue ===
3 July 2021 – Sibiu to Sibiu, 2.5 km (1.6 mi) (ITT)

Prologue Result
Rank	Rider	Team	Time
1	Pascal Ackermann (GER)	Bora–Hansgrohe	3' 18"
2	Martin Laas (EST)	Bora–Hansgrohe	+ 3"
3	Riccardo Stacchiotti (ITA)	Vini Zabù	+ 3"
4	Matthew Walls (GBR)	Bora–Hansgrohe	+ 4"
5	Nicolas Dalla Valle (ITA)	Bardiani–CSF–Faizanè	+ 5"
6	Tim Wollenberg (GER)	Maloja Pushbikers	+ 6"
7	Michael Kukrle (CZE)	Elkov–Kasper	+ 8"
8	Alexis Guérin (FRA)	Team Vorarlberg	+ 8"
9	Mel van der Veekens (NED)	Abloc CT	+ 9"
10	Karel Camrda (CZE)	Topforex–ATT Investments	+ 9"

General classification after Prologue
Rank	Rider	Team	Time
1	Pascal Ackermann (GER)	Bora–Hansgrohe	3' 18"
2	Martin Laas (EST)	Bora–Hansgrohe	+ 3"
3	Riccardo Stacchiotti (ITA)	Vini Zabù	+ 3"
4	Matthew Walls (GBR)	Bora–Hansgrohe	+ 4"
5	Nicolas Dalla Valle (ITA)	Bardiani–CSF–Faizanè	+ 5"
6	Tim Wollenberg (GER)	Maloja Pushbikers	+ 6"
7	Michael Kukrle (CZE)	Elkov–Kasper	+ 8"
8	Alexis Guérin (FRA)	Team Vorarlberg	+ 8"
9	Mel van der Veekens (NED)	Abloc CT	+ 9"
10	Karel Camrda (CZE)	Topforex–ATT Investments	+ 9"

=== Stage 1 ===
4 July 2021 – Sibiu to Păltiniș, 177.9 km (110.5 mi)

Stage 1 Result
Rank	Rider	Team	Time
1	Giovanni Aleotti (ITA)	Bora–Hansgrohe	4h 25' 14"
2	Fabio Aru (ITA)	Team Qhubeka NextHash	+ 0"
3	Sergey Chernetskiy (RUS)	Gazprom–RusVelo	+ 2"
4	Roland Thalmann (SUI)	Team Vorarlberg	+ 2"
5	Michal Schlegel (CZE)	Elkov–Kasper	+ 2"
6	Riccardo Zoidl (AUT)	Team Felbermayr–Simplon Wels	+ 13"
7	Jonas Rapp (GER)	Hrinkow Advarics Cycleang	+ 28"
8	Adam Ťoupalík (CZE)	Elkov–Kasper	+ 50"
9	Davide Rebellin (ITA)	Work Service–Marchiol–Vega	+ 56"
10	Giovanni Carboni (ITA)	Bardiani–CSF–Faizanè	+ 56"

General classification after Stage 1
Rank	Rider	Team	Time
1	Giovanni Aleotti (ITA)	Bora–Hansgrohe	4h 28' 32"
2	Fabio Aru (ITA)	Team Qhubeka NextHash	+ 17"
3	Michal Schlegel (CZE)	Elkov–Kasper	+ 20"
4	Sergey Chernetskiy (RUS)	Gazprom–RusVelo	+ 24"
5	Riccardo Zoidl (AUT)	Team Felbermayr–Simplon Wels	+ 35"
6	Roland Thalmann (SUI)	Team Vorarlberg	+ 37"
7	Adam Ťoupalík (CZE)	Elkov–Kasper	+ 1' 00"
8	Davide Rebellin (ITA)	Work Service–Marchiol–Vega	+ 1' 12"
9	Jonas Rapp (GER)	Hrinkow Advarics Cycleang	+ 1' 15"
10	Alexis Guérin (FRA)	Team Vorarlberg	+ 1' 15"

=== Stage 2 ===
5 July 2021 – Sibiu to Bâlea Lac, 187.5 km (116.5 mi)

Stage 2 Result
Rank	Rider	Team	Time
1	Alexis Guérin (FRA)	Team Vorarlberg	4h 50' 01"
2	Giovanni Aleotti (ITA)	Bora–Hansgrohe	+ 11"
3	Fabio Aru (ITA)	Team Qhubeka NextHash	+ 11"
4	Michal Schlegel (CZE)	Elkov–Kasper	+ 11"
5	Riccardo Zoidl (AUT)	Team Felbermayr–Simplon Wels	+ 11"
6	Sergey Chernetskiy (RUS)	Gazprom–RusVelo	+ 11"
7	Jonas Rapp (GER)	Hrinkow Advarics Cycleang	+ 16"
8	Roland Thalmann (SUI)	Team Vorarlberg	+ 29"
9	Luca Covili (ITA)	Bardiani–CSF–Faizanè	+ 35"
10	Enrico Battaglin (ITA)	Bardiani–CSF–Faizanè	+ 1' 06"

General classification after Stage 2
Rank	Rider	Team	Time
1	Giovanni Aleotti (ITA)	Bora–Hansgrohe	9h 18' 38"
2	Fabio Aru (ITA)	Team Qhubeka NextHash	+ 19"
3	Michal Schlegel (CZE)	Elkov–Kasper	+ 26"
4	Sergey Chernetskiy (RUS)	Gazprom–RusVelo	+ 30"
5	Riccardo Zoidl (AUT)	Team Felbermayr–Simplon Wels	+ 41"
6	Alexis Guérin (FRA)	Team Vorarlberg	+ 1' 00"
7	Roland Thalmann (SUI)	Team Vorarlberg	+ 1' 01"
8	Jonas Rapp (GER)	Hrinkow Advarics Cycleang	+ 1' 26"
9	Adam Ťoupalík (CZE)	Elkov–Kasper	+ 2' 05"
10	Davide Rebellin (ITA)	Work Service–Marchiol–Vega	+ 2' 15"

=== Stage 3 ===
6 July 2021 – Sibiu to Sibiu, 205.3 km (127.6 mi)

Stage 3 Result
Rank	Rider	Team	Time
1	Pascal Ackermann (GER)	Bora–Hansgrohe	4h 26' 16"
2	Eduard-Michael Grosu (ROU)	Romania	+ 2"
3	Matthew Walls (GBR)	Bora–Hansgrohe	+ 2"
4	Adam Ťoupalík (CZE)	Elkov–Kasper	+ 2"
5	Marco Canola (ITA)	Gazprom–RusVelo	+ 2"
6	Riccardo Stacchiotti (ITA)	Vini Zabù	+ 5"
7	Reinardt Janse van Rensburg (RSA)	Team Qhubeka NextHash	+ 5"
8	Marcin Budziński (POL)	HRE Mazowsze Serce Polski	+ 5"
9	Davide Appollonio (ITA)	Amore & Vita	+ 5"
10	Federico Burchio (ITA)	Work Service–Marchiol–Vega	+ 5"

General classification after Stage 3
Rank	Rider	Team	Time
1	Giovanni Aleotti (ITA)	Bora–Hansgrohe	13h 44' 59"
2	Fabio Aru (ITA)	Team Qhubeka NextHash	+ 19"
3	Michal Schlegel (CZE)	Elkov–Kasper	+ 26"
4	Sergey Chernetskiy (RUS)	Gazprom–RusVelo	+ 29"
5	Riccardo Zoidl (AUT)	Team Felbermayr–Simplon Wels	+ 41"
6	Alexis Guérin (FRA)	Team Vorarlberg	+ 1' 00"
7	Roland Thalmann (SUI)	Team Vorarlberg	+ 1' 01"
8	Jonas Rapp (GER)	Hrinkow Advarics Cycleang	+ 1' 26"
9	Adam Ťoupalík (CZE)	Elkov–Kasper	+ 2' 02"
10	Davide Rebellin (ITA)	Work Service–Marchiol–Vega	+ 2' 15"

== Classification leadership table ==
Classification leadership by stage
Stage	Winner	General classification	Points classification	Mountains classification	Young rider classification	Sprints classification	Romanian rider classification	Team classification
P	Pascal Ackermann	Pascal Ackermann	Pascal Ackermann	Not awarded	Tim Wollenberg	Not awarded	Daniel Crista	Bora–Hansgrohe
1	Giovanni Aleotti	Giovanni Aleotti	Giovanni Aleotti	Giovanni Aleotti	Giovanni Aleotti	Jonathan Couanon	Emil Dima	Elkov–Kasper
2	Alexis Guérin	Giovanni Aleotti	Giovanni Aleotti	Giovanni Aleotti	Giovanni Aleotti	Paweł Bernas	Emil Dima	Elkov–Kasper
3	Pascal Ackermann	Giovanni Aleotti	Pascal Ackermann	Daniel Turek	Giovanni Aleotti	Paweł Bernas	Emil Dima	Elkov–Kasper
Final		Giovanni Aleotti	Pascal Ackermann	Daniel Turek	Giovanni Aleotti	Paweł Bernas	Emil Dima	Elkov–Kasper

- On stage 1, Martin Laas, who was second in the points classification, wore the blue jersey, because first placed Pascal Ackermann wore the yellow jersey as the leader of the general classification.
- On stage 2, Pascal Ackermann, who was second in the points classification, wore the blue jersey, because first placed Giovanni Aleotti wore the yellow jersey as the leader of the general classification. For the same reason, Daniel Turek, who was second in the mountains classification, wore the white jersey, and Karel Camrda, who was second in the young rider classification, wore the blue polka dot jersey.
- On stage 3, Fabio Aru, who was second in the points classification, wore the blue jersey, because first placed Giovanni Aleotti wore the yellow jersey as the leader of the general classification. For the same reason, Meindert Weulink, who was second in the young rider classification, wore the blue polka dot jersey. Because Aleotti and Aru were also first and second, respectively, in the mountains classification, Alexis Guérin, who was third in the mountains classification, wore the white jersey.

== Final classification standings ==
Legend
Denotes the winner of the general classification	Denotes the winner of the young rider classification
Denotes the winner of the points classification	Denotes the winner of the sprints classification
Denotes the winner of the mountains classification	Denotes the winner of the Romanian rider classification

=== General classification ===
Final general classification (1–10)
Rank	Rider	Team	Time
1	Giovanni Aleotti (ITA)	Bora–Hansgrohe	13h 44' 59"
2	Fabio Aru (ITA)	Team Qhubeka NextHash	+ 19"
3	Michal Schlegel (CZE)	Elkov–Kasper	+ 26"
4	Sergey Chernetskiy (RUS)	Gazprom–RusVelo	+ 29"
5	Riccardo Zoidl (AUT)	Team Felbermayr–Simplon Wels	+ 41"
6	Alexis Guérin (FRA)	Team Vorarlberg	+ 1' 00"
7	Roland Thalmann (SUI)	Team Vorarlberg	+ 1' 01"
8	Jonas Rapp (GER)	Hrinkow Advarics Cycleang	+ 1' 26"
9	Adam Ťoupalík (CZE)	Elkov–Kasper	+ 2' 02"
10	Davide Rebellin (ITA)	Work Service–Marchiol–Vega	+ 2' 15"

=== Points classification ===
Final points classification (1–10)
Rank	Rider	Team	Points
1	Pascal Ackermann (GER)	Bora–Hansgrohe	50
2	Giovanni Aleotti (ITA)	Bora–Hansgrohe	45
3	Fabio Aru (ITA)	Team Qhubeka NextHash	35
4	Paweł Bernas (POL)	HRE Mazowsze Serce Polski	32
5	Alexis Guérin (FRA)	Team Vorarlberg	31
6	Matthew Walls (GBR)	Bora–Hansgrohe	27
7	Sergey Chernetskiy (RUS)	Gazprom–RusVelo	24
8	Michal Schlegel (CZE)	Elkov–Kasper	22
9	Riccardo Stacchiotti (ITA)	Vini Zabù	22
10	Martin Laas (EST)	Bora–Hansgrohe	20

=== Mountains classification ===
Final mountains classification (1–10)
Rank	Rider	Team	Points
1	Daniel Turek (CZE)	Team Felbermayr–Simplon Wels	32
2	Giovanni Aleotti (ITA)	Bora–Hansgrohe	31
3	Fabio Aru (ITA)	Team Qhubeka NextHash	26
4	Alexis Guérin (FRA)	Team Vorarlberg	20
5	Michal Schlegel (CZE)	Elkov–Kasper	16
6	Sergey Chernetskiy (RUS)	Gazprom–RusVelo	16
7	Riccardo Zoidl (AUT)	Team Felbermayr–Simplon Wels	12
8	Roland Thalmann (SUI)	Team Vorarlberg	11
9	Jonas Rapp (GER)	Hrinkow Advarics Cycleang	8
10	Jakub Otruba (CZE)	Elkov–Kasper	7

=== Young rider classification ===
Final young rider classification (1–10)
Rank	Rider	Team	Time
1	Giovanni Aleotti (ITA)	Bora–Hansgrohe	13h 44' 59"
2	Meindert Weulink (NED)	Abloc CT	+ 5' 18"
3	Karel Camrda (CZE)	Topforex–ATT Investments	+ 9' 16"
4	Fran Miholjević (CRO)	Cycling Team Friuli ASD	+ 10' 40"
5	Edoardo Sandri (ITA)	Cycling Team Friuli ASD	+ 12' 41"
6	Karel Tyrpekl (CZE)	Topforex–ATT Investments	+ 23' 28"
7	Karel Vacek (CZE)	Team Qhubeka NextHash	+ 23' 38"
8	Johannes Hodapp (GER)	Team SKS Sauerland NRW	+ 24' 26"
9	Alessandro Iacchi (ITA)	Vini Zabù	+ 27' 49"
10	Leonardo Zavala (MEX)	A.R. Monex Pro Cycling Team	+ 30' 37"

=== Sprints classification ===
Final sprints classification (1–10)
Rank	Rider	Team	Points
1	Paweł Bernas (POL)	HRE Mazowsze Serce Polski	56
2	Daniel Turek (CZE)	Team Felbermayr–Simplon Wels	36
3	Francesco Zandri (ITA)	Work Service–Marchiol–Vega	36
4	Jonathan Couanon (FRA)	Nippo–Provence–PTS Conti	21
5	Jan Bárta (CZE)	Elkov–Kasper	18
6	Timon Loderer (GER)	Hrinkow Advarics Cycleang	13
7	Jakub Otruba (CZE)	Elkov–Kasper	10
8	Adrian Kurek (POL)	HRE Mazowsze Serce Polski	10
9	Daniel Bichlmann (GER)	Maloja Pushbikers	7
10	Roberto González (PAN)	Vini Zabù	6

=== Romanian rider classification ===
Final Romanian rider classification (1–8)
Rank	Rider	Team	Time
1	Emil Dima (ROU)	Giotti Victoria–Savini Due	13h 50' 57"
2	Raul-Antonio Sinza (ROU)	Giotti Victoria–Savini Due	+ 31' 31"
3	Iustin-Ioan Văidian (ROU)	Romania	+ 34' 07"
4	Serghei Țvetcov (ROU)	Wildlife Generation Pro Cycling	+ 37' 48"
5	Ioan Dobrin (ROU)	Romania	+ 41' 37"
6	Serban Luncan (ROU)	Romania	+ 56' 36"
7	Eduard-Michael Grosu (ROU)	Romania	+ 1h 05' 35"
8	Adi-Narcis Marcu (ROU)	Romania	+ 1h 15' 51"

=== Team classification ===
Final team classification (1–10)
Rank	Team	Time
1	Elkov–Kasper	41h 20' 20"
2	Team Vorarlberg	+ 5"
3	Bardiani–CSF–Faizanè	+ 3' 50"
4	Gazprom–RusVelo	+ 10' 43"
5	Team Felbermayr–Simplon Wels	+ 14' 49"
6	Bora–Hansgrohe	+ 16' 38"
7	Vini Zabù	+ 22' 14"
8	Work Service–Marchiol–Vega	+ 25' 34"
9	HRE Mazowsze Serce Polski	+ 29' 29"
10	Global 6 Cycling	+ 31' 52"
