= 2019 Tour of the Alps =

2019 UCI Europe Tour

Race details
- Dates: 22–26 April 2019
- Stages: 5
- Distance: 711.7 km (442.2 mi)
- Winning time: 18h 58' 00"

Results
Jersey awarded to the overall winner	Winner	Pavel Sivakov (RUS)	(Team Sky)
	Second	Tao Geoghegan Hart (GBR)	(Team Sky)
	Third	Vincenzo Nibali (ITA)	(Bahrain–Merida)
Jersey awarded to the mountains classification winner	Mountains	Sergio Samitier (ESP)	(Euskadi–Murias)
Jersey awarded to the young rider classification winner	Young rider	Pavel Sivakov (RUS)	(Team Sky)
Jersey awarded to the sprints classification winner	Sprints	Matthias Krizek (AUT)	(Team Felbermayr–Simplon Wels)
	Team	Team Sky	

The 2019 Tour of the Alps was a road cycling stage race that took place in Austria and Italy between 22 and 26 April 2019. It was the 43rd edition of the renamed Giro del Trentino and was rated as a 2.HC event as part of the 2019 UCI Europe Tour.

== Route ==
Stage schedule
Stage	Date	Route	Distance	Type	Winner
1	22 April	Kufstein (Austria) to Kufstein (Austria)	144 km (89 mi)	Medium-mountain stage	Tao Geoghegan Hart (GBR)
2	23 April	Reith im Alpbachtal (Austria) to Schenna (Italy)	178.7 km (111 mi)	Mountain stage	Pavel Sivakov (RUS)
3	24 April	Salurn (Italy) to Baselga di Pinè (Italy)	106.3 km (66 mi)	Mountain stage	Fausto Masnada (ITA)
4	25 April	Baselga di Pinè (Italy) to Cles (Italy)	134 km (83 mi)	Mountain stage	Tao Geoghegan Hart (GBR)
5	26 April	Kaltern (Italy) to Bolzano (Italy)	148.7 km (92 mi)	Mountain stage	Fausto Masnada (ITA)

== Teams ==
On 29 January 2019, the race's twenty competing teams were announced at the 2018–19 FIS Nordic Combined World Cup event in Seefeld in Tirol, Austria. These included five UCI WorldTeams, nine UCI Professional Continental teams, five UCI Continental teams and an Italian national team.

UCI WorldTeams

- Bahrain–Merida
- Bora–Hansgrohe
- Astana
- AG2R La Mondiale
- Team Sky

UCI Professional Continental teams

- Androni Giocattoli–Sidermec
- Bardiani–CSF
- Caja Rural–Seguros RGA
- Euskadi–Murias
- Gazprom–RusVelo
- Team Manzana Postobón
- Neri Sottoli–Selle Italia–KTM
- Nippo–Vini Fantini–Faizanè
- Arkéa–Samsic

UCI Continental teams

- Team Felbermayr–Simplon Wels
- Team Vorarlberg Santic
- Team Colpack
- Giotti Victoria–Palomar
- Tirol KTM Cycling Team

National teams

- Italy

== Stages ==
=== Stage 1 ===
22 April 2019 — Kufstein (Austria) to Kufstein (Austria), 144 km (89 mi)

Result of Stage 1
Rank	Rider	Team	Time
1	Tao Geoghegan Hart (GBR)	Team Sky	3h 30' 38"
2	Alex Aranburu (ESP)	Caja Rural–Seguros RGA	+ 0"
3	Roland Thalmann (SUI)	Team Vorarlberg Santic	+ 0"
4	Pello Bilbao (ESP)	Astana	+ 0"
5	Nikita Stalnov (KAZ)	Astana	+ 0"
6	Chris Froome (GBR)	Team Sky	+ 0"
7	Aleksandr Vlasov (RUS)	Gazprom–RusVelo	+ 0"
8	Rafał Majka (POL)	Bora–Hansgrohe	+ 0"
9	Giovanni Carboni (ITA)	Bardiani–CSF	+ 0"
10	Dayer Quintana (COL)	Neri Sottoli–Selle Italia–KTM	+ 0"

General classification after Stage 1
Rank	Rider	Team	Time
1	Tao Geoghegan Hart (GBR)	Team Sky	3h 30' 38"
2	Roland Thalmann (SUI)	Team Vorarlberg Santic	+ 6"
3	Pello Bilbao (ESP)	Astana	+ 10"
4	Nikita Stalnov (KAZ)	Astana	+ 10"
5	Chris Froome (GBR)	Team Sky	+ 10"
6	Aleksandr Vlasov (RUS)	Gazprom–RusVelo	+ 10"
7	Rafał Majka (POL)	Bora–Hansgrohe	+ 10"
8	Giovanni Carboni (ITA)	Bardiani–CSF	+ 10"
9	Dayer Quintana (COL)	Neri Sottoli–Selle Italia–KTM	+ 10"
10	Mattia Cattaneo (ITA)	Androni Giocattoli–Sidermec	+ 10"

=== Stage 2 ===
23 April 2019 — Reith im Alpbachtal (Austria) to Schenna (Italy), 178.7 km (111 mi)

Result of Stage 2
Rank	Rider	Team	Time
1	Pavel Sivakov (RUS)	Team Sky	4h 58' 17"
2	Jan Hirt (CZE)	Astana	+ 4"
3	Mattia Cattaneo (ITA)	Androni Giocattoli–Sidermec	+ 17"
4	Fausto Masnada (ITA)	Androni Giocattoli–Sidermec	+ 22"
5	Hermann Pernsteiner (AUT)	Bahrain–Merida	+ 29"
6	Rafał Majka (POL)	Bora–Hansgrohe	+ 29"
7	Vincenzo Nibali (ITA)	Bahrain–Merida	+ 29"
8	Tao Geoghegan Hart (GBR)	Team Sky	+ 43"
9	Pello Bilbao (ESP)	Astana	+ 43"
10	Nikita Stalnov (KAZ)	Astana	+ 52"

General classification after Stage 2
Rank	Rider	Team	Time
1	Pavel Sivakov (RUS)	Team Sky	8h 28' 55"
2	Jan Hirt (CZE)	Astana	+ 8"
3	Mattia Cattaneo (ITA)	Androni Giocattoli–Sidermec	+ 23"
4	Rafał Majka (POL)	Bora–Hansgrohe	+ 39"
5	Hermann Pernsteiner (AUT)	Bahrain–Merida	+ 39"
6	Vincenzo Nibali (ITA)	Bahrain–Merida	+ 39"
7	Tao Geoghegan Hart (GBR)	Team Sky	+ 43"
8	Pello Bilbao (ESP)	Astana	+ 53"
9	Nikita Stalnov (KAZ)	Astana	+ 1' 02"
10	Roland Thalmann (SUI)	Team Vorarlberg Santic	+ 1' 08"

=== Stage 3 ===
24 April 2019 — Salurn (Italy) to Baselga di Pinè (Italy), 106.3 km (66 mi)

Result of Stage 3
Rank	Rider	Team	Time
1	Fausto Masnada (ITA)	Androni Giocattoli–Sidermec	2h 58' 09"
2	Tao Geoghegan Hart (GBR)	Team Sky	+ 5"
3	Rafał Majka (POL)	Bora–Hansgrohe	+ 5"
4	Vincenzo Nibali (ITA)	Bahrain–Merida	+ 5"
5	Dario Cataldo (ITA)	Astana	+ 5"
6	Aleksandr Vlasov (RUS)	Gazprom–RusVelo	+ 5"
7	Pavel Sivakov (RUS)	Team Sky	+ 5"
8	Jan Hirt (CZE)	Astana	+ 5"
9	Roland Thalmann (SUI)	Team Vorarlberg Santic	+ 5"
10	Mattia Cattaneo (ITA)	Androni Giocattoli–Sidermec	+ 5"

General classification after Stage 3
Rank	Rider	Team	Time
1	Pavel Sivakov (RUS)	Team Sky	11h 27' 08"
2	Jan Hirt (CZE)	Astana	+ 8"
3	Mattia Cattaneo (ITA)	Androni Giocattoli–Sidermec	+ 23"
4	Rafał Majka (POL)	Bora–Hansgrohe	+ 35"
5	Tao Geoghegan Hart (GBR)	Team Sky	+ 37"
6	Vincenzo Nibali (ITA)	Bahrain–Merida	+ 39"
7	Hermann Pernsteiner (AUT)	Bahrain–Merida	+ 1' 01"
8	Roland Thalmann (SUI)	Team Vorarlberg Santic	+ 1' 08"
9	Aleksandr Vlasov (RUS)	Gazprom–RusVelo	+ 1' 24"
10	Fausto Masnada (ITA)	Androni Giocattoli–Sidermec	+ 1' 35"

=== Stage 4 ===
25 April 2019 — Baselga di Pinè (Italy) to Cles (Italy), 134 km (83 mi)

Result of Stage 4
Rank	Rider	Team	Time
1	Tao Geoghegan Hart (GBR)	Team Sky	3h 26' 32"
2	Vincenzo Nibali (ITA)	Bahrain–Merida	+ 0"
3	Rafał Majka (POL)	Bora–Hansgrohe	+ 0"
4	Pavel Sivakov (RUS)	Team Sky	+ 0"
5	Chris Froome (GBR)	Team Sky	+ 40"
6	Mattia Cattaneo (ITA)	Androni Giocattoli–Sidermec	+ 40"
7	Aleksandr Vlasov (RUS)	Gazprom–RusVelo	+ 40"
8	Hubert Dupont (FRA)	AG2R La Mondiale	+ 40"
9	Mikel Bizkarra (ESP)	Euskadi–Murias	+ 40"
10	Jan Hirt (CZE)	Astana	+ 40"

General classification after Stage 4
Rank	Rider	Team	Time
1	Pavel Sivakov (RUS)	Team Sky	14h 53' 40"
2	Tao Geoghegan Hart (GBR)	Team Sky	+ 27"
3	Rafał Majka (POL)	Bora–Hansgrohe	+ 31"
4	Vincenzo Nibali (ITA)	Bahrain–Merida	+ 33"
5	Jan Hirt (CZE)	Astana	+ 48"
6	Mattia Cattaneo (ITA)	Androni Giocattoli–Sidermec	+ 1' 03"
7	Aleksandr Vlasov (RUS)	Gazprom–RusVelo	+ 2' 04"
8	Giovanni Carboni (ITA)	Bardiani–CSF	+ 2' 30"
9	Chris Froome (GBR)	Team Sky	+ 2' 34"
10	Pello Bilbao (ESP)	Astana	+ 2' 39"

=== Stage 5 ===
26 April 2019 — Kaltern (Italy) to Bolzano (Italy), 148.7 km (92 mi)

Result of Stage 5
Rank	Rider	Team	Time
1	Fausto Masnada (ITA)	Androni Giocattoli–Sidermec	4h 02' 06"
2	Carlos Quintero (COL)	Team Manzana Postobón	+ 7"
3	Simone Velasco (ITA)	Neri Sottoli–Selle Italia–KTM	+ 1' 31"
4	Dario Cataldo (ITA)	Astana	+ 1' 31"
5	Roland Thalmann (SUI)	Team Vorarlberg Santic	+ 1' 33"
6	Alexis Vuillermoz (FRA)	AG2R La Mondiale	+ 2' 14"
7	Vincenzo Nibali (ITA)	Bahrain–Merida	+ 2' 14"
8	Mattia Cattaneo (ITA)	Androni Giocattoli–Sidermec	+ 2' 14"
9	Tao Geoghegan Hart (GBR)	Team Sky	+ 2' 14"
10	Pavel Sivakov (RUS)	Team Sky	+ 2 14"

Final general classification
Rank	Rider	Team	Time
1	Pavel Sivakov (RUS)	Team Sky	18h 58' 00"
2	Tao Geoghegan Hart (GBR)	Team Sky	+ 27"
3	Vincenzo Nibali (ITA)	Bahrain–Merida	+ 33"
4	Mattia Cattaneo (ITA)	Androni Giocattoli–Sidermec	+ 1' 03"
5	Fausto Masnada (ITA)	Androni Giocattoli–Sidermec	+ 1' 13"
6	Rafał Majka (POL)	Bora–Hansgrohe	+ 1' 46"
7	Jan Hirt (CZE)	Astana	+ 2' 03"
8	Dario Cataldo (ITA)	Astana	+ 2' 58"
9	Roland Thalmann (SUI)	Team Vorarlberg Santic	+ 3' 14"
10	Aleksandr Vlasov (RUS)	Gazprom–RusVelo	+ 4' 27"

== Classification leadership table ==
In the 2019 Tour of the Alps, four different jerseys were awarded. The general classification was calculated by adding each cyclist's finishing times on each stage. Time bonuses were awarded to the first three finishers on all stages: the stage winner won a ten-second bonus, with six and four seconds for the second and third riders respectively. The leader of the general classification received a fuchsia jersey; this classification was considered the most important of the 2019 Tour of the Alps, and the winner of the classification was considered the winner of the race.

Points for the mountains classification
Position	1	2	3	4	5
Points for Category 1	10	8	6	4	2
Points for Category 2	6	4	2	0	
Points for Category 3	3	2	1	0	

The second classification was the sprints classification, the leader of which was awarded a red jersey. In the sprints classification, riders received points for finishing in the top three at intermediate sprint points during each stage. Points were awarded on a 6–4–2 scale for all stages.

There was also a mountains classification, for which points were awarded for reaching the top of a climb before other riders. Each of the ten climbs were categorised as either first, second, or third-category, with more points available for the more difficult, higher-categorised climbs. For first-category climbs, the top five riders earned points; on the other climbs, only the top three riders earned points. The leadership of the mountains classification was marked by a green jersey

The fourth jersey represented the young rider classification, marked by a white jersey. Only riders born after 1 January 1996 were eligible; the young rider best placed in the general classification was the leader of the young rider classification. There was also a classification for teams, in which the times of the best three cyclists in a team on each stage were added together; the leading team at the end of the race was the team with the lowest cumulative time.

Stage	Winner	General classification	Mountains classification	Young rider classification	Sprints classification	Team classification
1	Tao Geoghegan Hart	Tao Geoghegan Hart	Emil Dima	Aleksandr Vlasov	Matthias Krizek	Team Sky
2	Pavel Sivakov	Pavel Sivakov	Sergio Samitier	Pavel Sivakov	Maximilian Kuen	Astana
3	Fausto Masnada	Pavel Sivakov	Sergio Samitier	Pavel Sivakov	Maximilian Kuen	Astana
4	Tao Geoghegan Hart	Pavel Sivakov	Sergio Samitier	Pavel Sivakov	Matthias Krizek	Astana
5	Fausto Masnada	Pavel Sivakov	Sergio Samitier	Pavel Sivakov	Matthias Krizek	Team Sky
Final		Pavel Sivakov	Sergio Samitier	Pavel Sivakov	Matthias Krizek	Team Sky
