= Yauheni Karaliok =

Belarusian cyclist (born 1996)

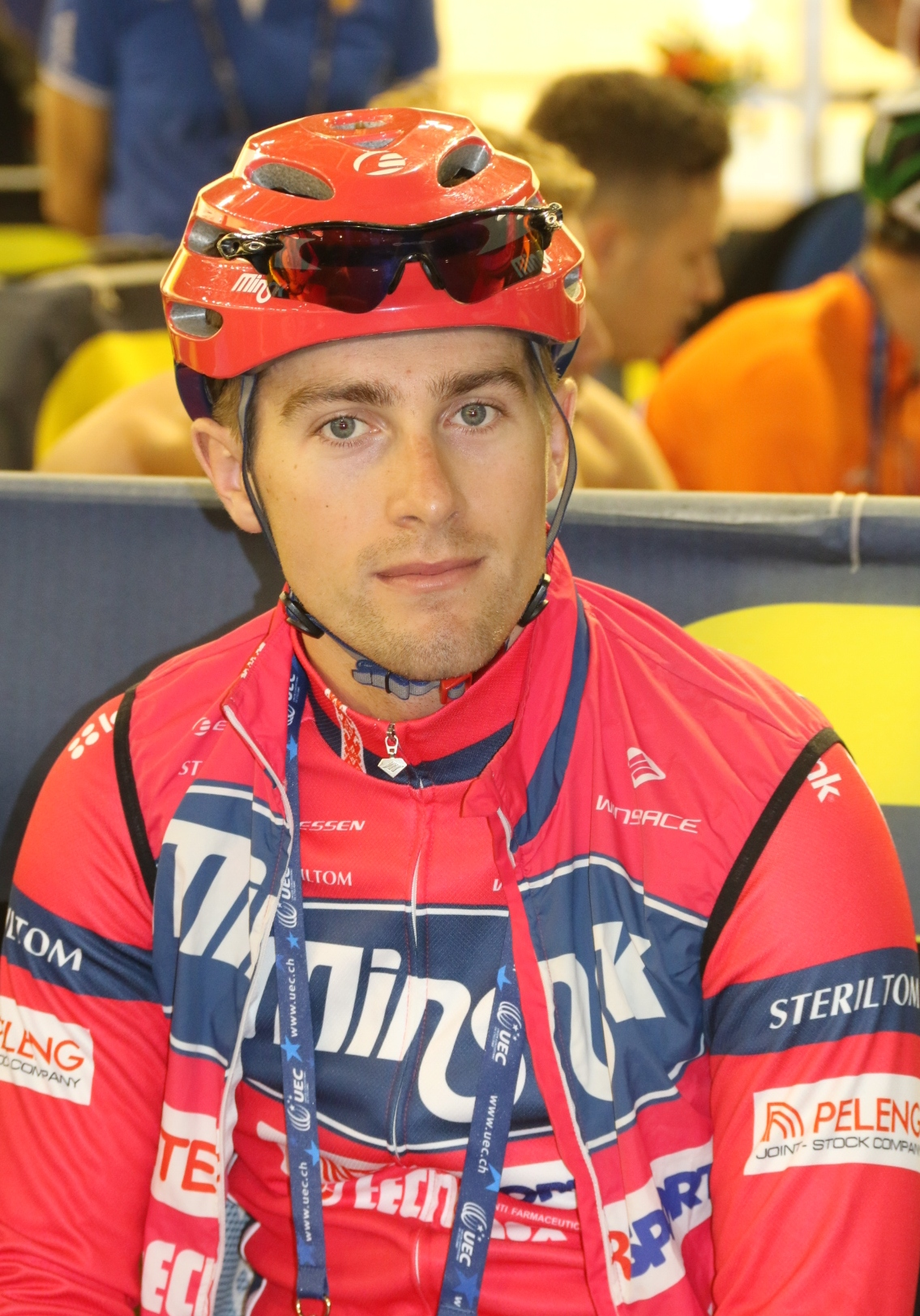
- Karaliok in 2017

Personal information
- Full name: Yauheni Karaliok
- Born: 9 June 1996 (age 30)

Cycling career
- Sport: Cycling
- Current team: Minsk Cycling Club
- Disciplines: Track; Road
- Role: Rider

Professional teams
- 2017–: Minsk Cycling Club
- 2020: Gazprom–RusVelo (stagiaire)

Major wins
- Road National Time Trial Championships (2020, 2021, 2022) Track Scratch, World Championships (2018, 2020)
Medal record
Men's track cycling
Representing Belarus
World Championships
| Gold medal – first place | 2018 Apeldoorn | Scratch |
| Gold medal – first place | 2020 Berlin | Scratch |
European Games
| Bronze medal – third place | 2019 Minsk | Scratch |
European Championships
| Silver medal – second place | 2020 Plovdiv | Omnium |
U23 & Junior European Championships
| Gold medal – first place | 2017 Sangalhos | U23 Scratch |
| Bronze medal – third place | 2015 Athens | U23 Team pursuit |
| Bronze medal – third place | 2018 Aigle | U23 Elimination race |

Yauheni Karaliok (Belarusian: Яўгеній Сяргеевіч Каралёк; born 9 June 1996) is a Belarusian road and track cyclist, who currently rides for UCI Continental team Minsk Cycling Club.

He competed at the 2015 UEC European Track Championships in the team pursuit event and at the 2016 UEC European Track Championships also in the team pursuit event.

== Major results ==
=== Road ===
2017
1st Time trial, National Under-23 Championships
1st Grand Prix Minsk
2018
1st Stage 4 Tour of Mersin
1st Stage 1 Tour of Estonia
5th Overall Tour of Mevlana
2019
1st Minsk Cup
2nd Grand Prix Alanya
3rd Time trial, National Championships
2020
National Championships

1st Time trial
3rd Road race

2nd Grand Prix Gazipaşa
10th GP Manavgat
2021
1st Time trial, National Championships
5th Overall Five Rings of Moscow
2022
National Championships

1st Time trial
2nd Road race

1st Grand Prix Justiniano Hotels

=== Track ===
2015
2nd Omnium, National Championships
3rd Team pursuit, UEC European Under-23 Championships
2017
1st Scratch, UEC European Under-23 Championships
1st Scratch, UCI World Cup, Los Angeles
2018
1st Scratch, UCI World Championships
1st Scratch, National Championships
1st Scratch, UCI World Cup, Minsk
2019
National Championships

1st Madison (with Mikhail Shemetau)
1st Omnium
1st Points race
1st Scratch
1st Team pursuit
2nd Individual pursuit

1st Scratch, UCI World Cup, Minsk
3rd Scratch, European Games
2020
1st Scratch, UCI World Championships
National Championships

1st Individual pursuit
1st Points race
2nd Team pursuit
3rd Scratch

2nd Omnium, UEC European Championships
2021
UCI Nations Cup, Hong Kong

1st Scratch
2nd Omnium

National Championships

1st Elimination
1st Madison (with Dzianis Marchuk)
1st Omnium
1st Team pursuit
2nd Scratch
