= Giovanni Aleotti =

Italian cyclist (born 1999)

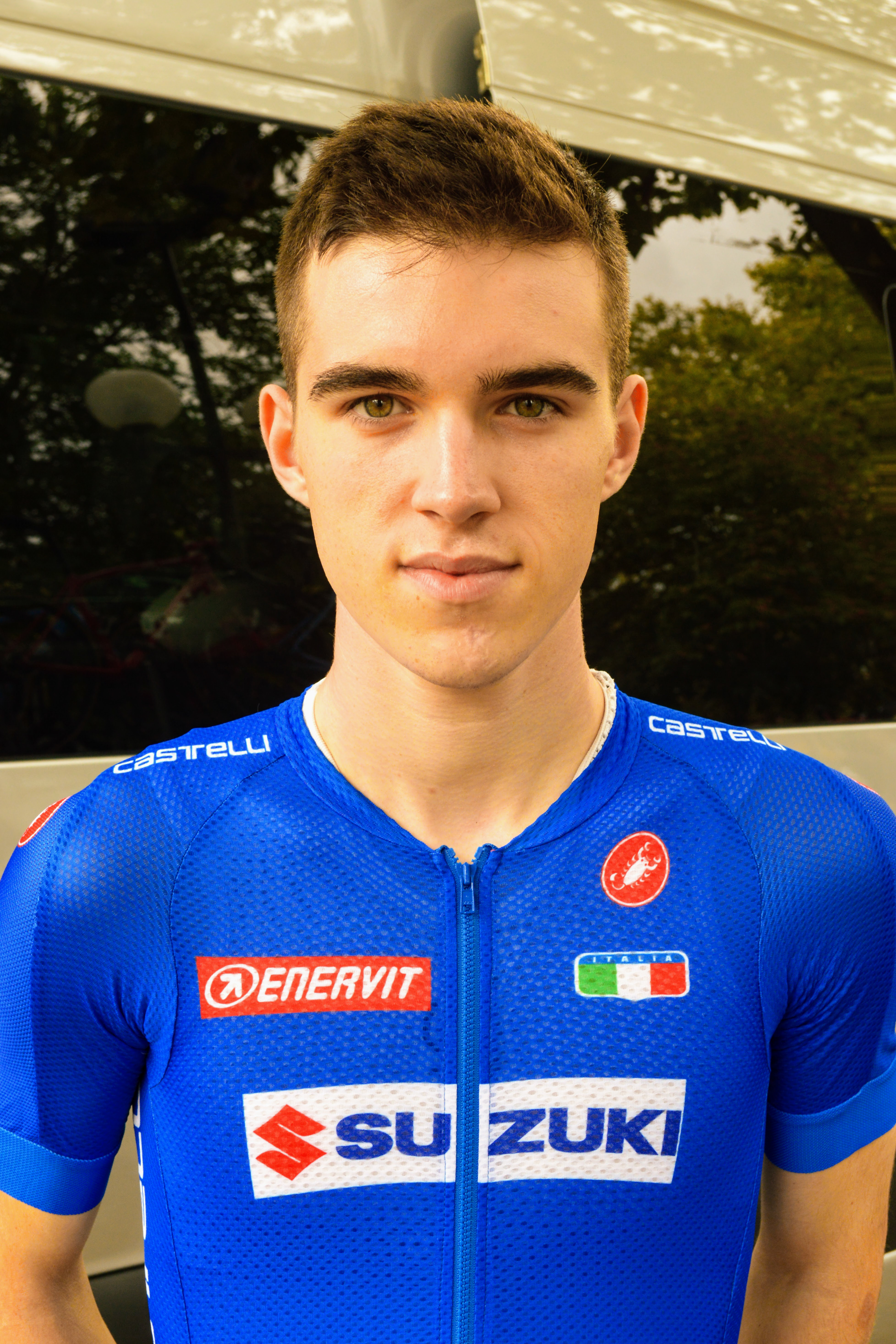
- Aleotti in 2019

Personal information
- Full name: Giovanni Aleotti
- Born: 25 May 1999 (age 27) Mirandola, Italy

Cycling career
- Sport: Cycling
- Current team: Red Bull–Bora–Hansgrohe
- Discipline: Road
- Role: Rider

Amateur team
- 2018: Cycling Team Friuli

Professional teams
- 2019–2020: Cycling Team Friuli
- 2021–: Bora–Hansgrohe

Major wins
- Stage races Tour of Slovenia (2024)

Giovanni Aleotti (born 25 May 1999) is an Italian cyclist, who currently rides for UCI WorldTeam Red Bull–Bora–Hansgrohe.

== Major results ==
2017
3rd Trofeo Guido Dorigo
2018
7th Overall Tour of Romania
8th Gran Premio Sportivi di Poggiana
2019
1st Trofeo Edil C
1st Coppa Città di San Daniele
2nd Time trial, National Under-23 Road Championships
2nd Overall Tour de l'Avenir
2nd Overall Carpathian Couriers Race
2nd Gran Premio Sportivi di Poggiana
2nd Giro del Belvedere
3rd G.P. Palio del Recioto
3rd Trofeo Piva
6th Giro del Medio Brenta
2020
1st Road race, National Under-23 Road Championships
4th Overall Giro Ciclistico d'Italia
2021 (2 pro wins)
1st Overall Sibiu Cycling Tour

1st Young rider classification
1st Stage 1

2nd Circuito de Getxo
3rd Overall Settimana Ciclistica Italiana

1st Young rider classification

2022 (3)
1st Overall Sibiu Cycling Tour

1st Stages 2 & 3a (ITT)

7th Grand Prix Cycliste de Montréal
2023
4th Overall Tour of Slovenia
2024 (2)
1st Overall Tour of Slovenia

1st Points classification
1st Stage 3

6th Overall Tour of Guangxi
2025
4th Road race, National Road Championships
8th Overall Vuelta a Burgos
2026
8th Overall Settimana Internazionale di Coppi e Bartali
10th Overall Tour of the Alps

=== Grand Tour general classification results timeline ===
Grand Tour	2021	2022	2023	2024
Giro d'Italia	80	72	DNF	24
Tour de France	—	—	—	—
Vuelta a España	—	—	—	38

Legend
—	Did not compete
DNF	Did not finish
