= Sergey Rostovtsev =

Russian cyclist

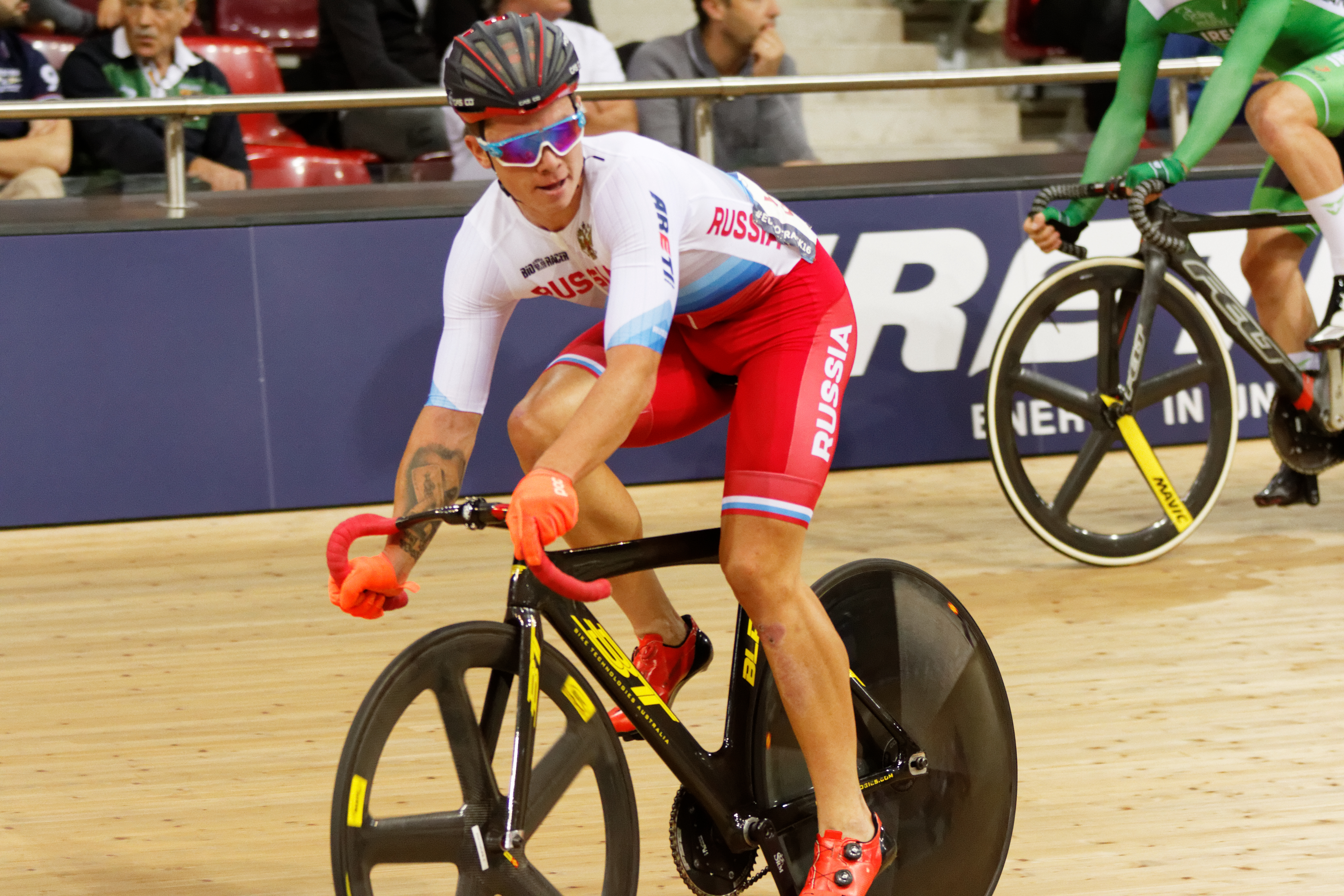
- Rostovstev in 2016

Personal information
- Born: 2 June 1997 (age 29) Tula, Russia

Cycling career
- Sport: Cycling
- Current team: Bardiani CSF7 Saber
- Disciplines: Track; Road
- Role: Rider

Amateur teams
- 2016: SC Valle Seriana–Cene ASD
- 2017: Marathon–Tula
- 2017–2018: VC Cremonese–Guerciotti
- 2019: GSC Viris Vigevano
- 2020–2021: Marathon–Tula
- 2022: MSMK Sbornaya Rossii
- 2022: CSC Olymp

Professional teams
- 2020: Minsk Cycling Club
- 2022: Vozrozhdenie
- 2023: Beykoz Belediyesi Spor Kulübü
- 2024: Sakarya BB Pro Team
- 2025–: VF Group–Bardiani–CSF–Faizanè
Medal record
Men's track cycling
Representing Uzbekistan
Asian Games
| Bronze medal – third place | 2026 Aichi–Nagoya | Madison |
Representing Russian Cycling Federation
World Championships
| Bronze medal – third place | 2021 Roubaix | Elimination |
Representing Russia
European Championships
| Gold medal – first place | 2021 Grenchen | Elimination |
| Bronze medal – third place | 2020 Plovdiv | Elimination |
Junior World Championships
| Gold medal – first place | 2014 Gwangmyeong | Scratch |
| Bronze medal – third place | 2015 Astana | Team pursuit |
U23 & Junior European Championships
| Gold medal – first place | 2015 Athens | Junior Team pursuit |
| Gold medal – first place | 2016 Montichiari | U23 Madison |
| Silver medal – second place | 2017 Sangalhos | U23 Madison |
| Bronze medal – third place | 2015 Athens | Junior Omnium |
| Bronze medal – third place | 2018 Aigle | U23 Omnium |

Sergey Rostovtsev (born 2 June 1997) is a Russian-Uzbekistani road and track cyclist, who currently rides for Bardiani CSF 7 Saber (since 2025).

He is the son of Mikhail Rostovtsev, a Russian track cycling coach, and Olga Slyusareva, an Olympic champion in the points race. In early 2026, Rostovtsev switched his sporting nationality to Uzbekistan, joining the Uzbek national track cycling team at the 2026 Asian Track Cycling Championships.

== Major results ==
=== Track ===
2014
1st Scratch, UCI World Junior Championships
2015
UEC European Junior Championships

1st Team pursuit
3rd Omnium

National Junior Championships

1st Omnium
1st Team pursuit

3rd Team pursuit, UCI World Junior Championships
2016
1st Madison (with Maksim Piskunov), UEC European Under-23 Championships
2017
National Championships

1st Madison (with Mamyr Stash)
1st Scratch
1st Omnium

2nd Madison (with Maxim Piskunov), UEC European Under-23 Championships
2020
3rd Elimination, UEC European Championships
2021
1st Elimination, UEC European Championships
3rd Elimination, UCI World Championships

=== Road ===
2015
1st Points classification, Trophée Centre Morbihan
1st Stage 1 Peace Race Juniors
2nd Time trial, National Junior Championships
2017
5th Overall Five Rings of Moscow

1st Stage 3

2018
6th ZLM Tour
10th Overall Five Rings of Moscow
2021
Five Rings of Moscow

1st Stages 3 & 4

10th GP Mediterranean
2022
4th Grand Prix Justiniano Hotels
5th Grand Prix Gazipaşa
6th Grand Prix Yahyalı
2023
1st Grand Prix Apollon Temple
1st Grand Prix El Marsa
1st Grand Prix Boukraa
Tour de Maurice

1st Points classification
1st Sprints classification
1st Stage 4

4th Grand Prix Kültepe
5th Alanya Cup
7th Grand Prix Es-Semara
10th Syedra Ancient City
2024
1st Stage 4 Tour of Mersin
3rd Grand Prix Apollon Temple
2026
1st Stage 3, Tour of Antalya
2nd Time trial, National Road Championships
