= Matt Walls =

British road and track cyclist

Matt Walls MBE
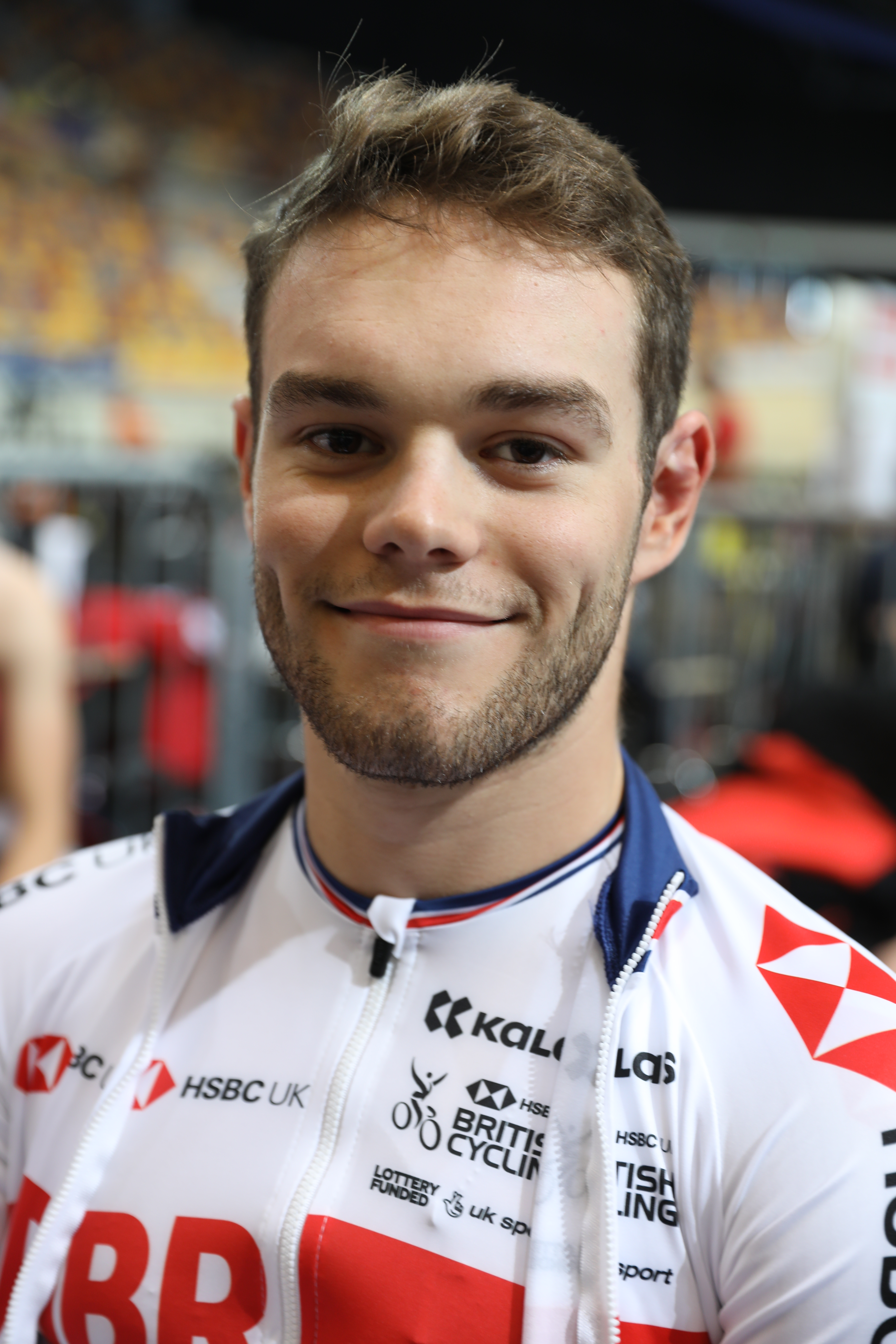
- Walls in 2019

Personal information
- Full name: Matthew Walls
- Nickname: Wallsey
- Born: 20 April 1998 (age 28) Oldham, England
- Height: 1.77 m (5 ft 10 in)
- Weight: 72 kg (159 lb)

Cycling career
- Sport: Cycling
- Current team: Groupama–FDJ United
- Disciplines: Track; Road
- Role: Rider

Amateur teams
- 2017–2019: 100% Me
- 2019: EF Education First (stagiaire)
- 2020: Trinity Racing

Professional teams
- 2021–2023: Bora–Hansgrohe
- 2024–2025: Groupama–FDJ

Major wins
- Road One day races and Classics Gran Piemonte (2021) Track Olympic Games Omnium (2021)
Medal record
Men's track cycling
Representing Great Britain
Olympic Games
Gold medal – first place	2020 Tokyo	Omnium
Silver medal – second place	2020 Tokyo	Madison
World Championships
Bronze medal – third place	2020 Berlin	Omnium
European Championships
Gold medal – first place	2018 Glasgow	Elimination
Gold medal – first place	2020 Plovdiv	Omnium
Gold medal – first place	2020 Plovdiv	Elimination
Junior World Championships
Silver medal – second place	2016 Aigle	Points race
Bronze medal – third place	2016 Aigle	Team pursuit
U23 & Junior European Championships
Gold medal – first place	2016 Aigle	Junior Madison
Gold medal – first place	2016 Aigle	Junior Team pursuit
Gold medal – first place	2017 Sangalhos	Under-23 Team pursuit
Gold medal – first place	2018 Aigle	Under-23 Scratch
Gold medal – first place	2018 Aigle	Under-23 Madison
Gold medal – first place	2018 Aigle	Under-23 Team pursuit
Gold medal – first place	2019 Ghent	Under-23 Omnium
Gold medal – first place	2019 Ghent	Under-23 Madison

Matthew Thomas Walls (born 20 April 1998) is a British road and track cyclist, who most recently rode for UCI WorldTeam Groupama–FDJ United.

== Early life ==
Walls was raised in Oldham in Greater Manchester. He attended Crompton House Church of England Academy.

== Career ==
Walls won the gold medal in the men's omnium event at the 2020 Summer Olympics.

Walls was involved in an accident during the 2022 Commonwealth Games when his bike was catapulted over the barriers and into the spectators.

== Major results ==
=== Road ===
2016
1st Points classification, Junior Tour of Wales
2018
Flèche du Sud

1st Points classification
1st Stages 1 & 5

1st Stage 3 Paris–Arras Tour
2019
1st Stage 2 Giro Ciclistico d'Italia
2nd Overall Paris–Arras Tour

1st Stage 3

2nd Arno Wallaard Memorial
3rd Entre Brenne et Montmorillonnais
10th Road race, UEC European Under-23 Championships
2021 (2 pro wins)
1st Gran Piemonte
1st Stage 4 Tour of Norway
2024
2nd Circuit race, National Championships
2025
6th Tour de Vendée
9th Classique Dunkerque

=== Track ===
2016
UEC European Junior Championships

1st Team pursuit
1st Madison (with Rhys Britton)

UCI World Junior Championships

2nd Points race
3rd Team pursuit

2nd Madison, National Championships (with Matt Bostock)
2017
1st Team pursuit, UEC European Under-23 Championships
1st Six Days of Berlin Under-23 (with Ethan Hayter)
National Championships

1st Madison (with Ethan Hayter)
1st Omnium
2nd Team pursuit

2018
1st Elimination, UEC European Championships
1st Omnium, UCI World Cup, London
UEC European Under-23 Championships

1st Madison (with Ethan Hayter)
1st Scratch
1st Team pursuit

National Championships

1st Omnium
1st Team pursuit
3rd Scratch

2019
UEC European Under-23 Championships

1st Madison (with Fred Wright)
1st Omnium

National Championships

1st Omnium
2nd Points race
2nd Team pursuit

2020
UEC European Championships

1st Elimination
1st Omnium

3rd Omnium, UCI World Championships
2021
Olympic Games

1st Omnium
2nd Madison (with Ethan Hayter)

== Honours and awards ==
Walls was awarded the Freedom of the Borough of Oldham on 8 September 2021.

He was appointed Member of the Order of the British Empire (MBE) in the 2022 New Year Honours for services to cycling.
