= Settimana Ciclistica Italiana =

Italian cycling race

Race details
- Date: July
- Region: Sardinia, Italy
- Discipline: Road
- Competition: UCI Europe Tour
- Type: Stage race
- Web site: www.settimanaciclisticaitaliana.it

History
- First edition: 2021
- Editions: 1 (as of 2021)
- First winner: Diego Ulissi (ITA)
- Most recent: Diego Ulissi (ITA)

The Settimana Ciclistica Italiana wass a professional bicycle road race, held in July 2021 throughout the Sardinia island in Italy. It took place as part of the UCI Europe Tour as a 2.1 category event, with five stages over hilly terrain.

== Winners ==
Year	Country	Rider	Team
2021	Italy	Diego Ulissi	UAE Team Emirates

== Classifications ==
As of the 2021 edition, the jerseys worn by the leaders of the individual classifications are:
- Blue Jersey – The Blue Jersey is worn by the leader of the overall classification.
- White Jersey – The White Jersey is worn by the leader of the overall Points classification.
- Orange Jersey – Worn by the best rider under 23 years of age on the overall classification as leader of the Young rider classification.
- Green Jersey – The Green Jersey is worn by the leader of the overall Mountains classification.
